= List of gymnasts at the 1968 Summer Olympics =

This is a list of the gymnasts who represented their country at the 1968 Summer Olympics in Mexico City from 12–27 October 1968. Only one discipline, artistic gymnastics, was included in the Games.

== Female artistic gymnasts ==
	Name	Country	Date of birth (Age)
Youngest competitor	Laura Rivera	Mexico	17 October 1954 (aged 13)
Oldest competitor	Ute Starke	East Germany	14 January 1939 (aged 29)

NOC	Name	Date of birth (Age)	Hometown
Australia	Val Norris	28 June 1943 (aged 25)	Perth, Western Australia
Belgium	Christiane Goethals	29 July 1947 (aged 21)	Bruges, Belgium
Belgium	Horta van Hoye	26 December 1946 (aged 21)	Sint-Joris-Weert, Belgium
Bulgaria	Rayna Atanasova	10 July 1944 (aged 24)	Varna, Bulgaria
Bulgaria	Mariya Karashka	4 August 1942 (aged 26)	Sofia, Bulgaria
Bulgaria	Vanya Marinova	22 October 1950 (aged 17)	Varna, Bulgaria
Bulgaria	Vesela Pasheva	30 November 1946 (aged 21)	Ruse, Bulgaria
Bulgaria	Neli Stoyanova	19 December 1946 (aged 21)	Varna, Bulgaria
Canada	Suzanne Cloutier	25 July 1947 (aged 21)	Sainte-Agathe-des-Monts, Quebec
Canada	Jennifer Diachun	14 August 1953 (aged 15)	Toronto, Ontario
Canada	Sandra Hartley	23 June 1948 (aged 20)	Vancouver, British Columbia
Canada	Teresa McDonnell	8 December 1953 (aged 14)	Toronto, Ontario
Canada	Marilynn Minaker	12 November 1949 (aged 18)	Kirkland Lake, Ontario
Chinese Taipei	Hong Tai-Kwai	8 December 1946 (aged 21)	Pingtung, Taiwan
Chinese Taipei	Yu Mai-Lee	13 September 1952 (aged 16)	Zhejiang, China
Cuba	Nancy Aldama	28 August 1946 (aged 22)	Havana, Cuba
Cuba	Nereida Bauta	14 July 1950 (aged 18)	Havana, Cuba
Cuba	Suzette Blanco	15 September 1948 (aged 20)	Havana, Cuba
Cuba	Zulema Bregado	31 January 1951 (aged 17)	Havana, Cuba
Cuba	Yolanda Vega	27 June 1946 (aged 22)	Havana, Cuba
Cuba	Miriam Villacián	26 May 1950 (aged 18)	Havana, Cuba
Czechoslovakia	Věra Čáslavská	3 May 1942 (aged 26)	Prague, Czechoslovakia
Czechoslovakia	Jana Kubičková	9 January 1945 (aged 23)	Nové Sady, Czechoslovakia
Czechoslovakia	Hana Lišková	4 June 1952 (aged 16)	Prague, Czechoslovakia
Czechoslovakia	Marianna Némethová-Krajčírová	1 June 1948 (aged 20)	Košice, Czechoslovakia
Czechoslovakia	Bohumila Řimnáčová	9 September 1947 (aged 21)	Prague, Czechoslovakia
Czechoslovakia	Miroslava Skleničková	11 March 1951 (aged 17)	Karlovy Vary, Czechoslovakia
Denmark	Else Trangbæk	7 February 1946 (aged 22)	Viborg, Denmark
East Germany	Maritta Bauerschmidt	23 March 1950 (aged 18)	Waldheim, East Germany
East Germany	Karin Janz	17 February 1952 (aged 16)	Lübben, East Germany
East Germany	Marianne Noack	5 October 1951 (aged 17)	Rostock, East Germany
East Germany	Magdalena Schmidt	30 June 1949 (aged 19)	Lauchhammer, East Germany
East Germany	Ute Starke	14 January 1939 (aged 29)	Eisleben, East Germany
East Germany	Erika Zuchold	19 March 1947 (aged 21)	Lucka, East Germany
France	Nicole Bourdiau	2 June 1948 (aged 20)	Écuisses, France
France	Jacqueline Brisepierre	30 October 1945 (aged 22)	Montceau-les-Mines, France
France	Mireille Cayre	2 April 1947 (aged 21)	Moulins, France
France	Dominique Lauvard	30 August 1949 (aged 19)	Vincennes, France
France	Evelyne Letourneur	13 September 1947 (aged 21)	Vernon, France
France	Françoise Nourry	1 September 1948 (aged 20)	Bègles, France
Great Britain	Margaret Bell	23 February 1945 (aged 23)	Beckenham, England
Great Britain	Mary Prestidge	18 December 1948 (aged 19)	London, England
Hungary	Ágnes Bánfai	8 June 1947 (aged 21)	Budapest, Hungary
Hungary	Ilona Békési	11 December 1953 (aged 14)	Budapest, Hungary
Hungary	Anikó Ducza	8 August 1942 (aged 26)	Budapest, Hungary
Hungary	Katalin Makray	5 April 1945 (aged 23)	Vasvár, Hungary
Hungary	Katalin Müller	13 September 1943 (aged 25)	Budapest, Hungary
Hungary	Márta Tolnai	23 August 1941 (aged 27)	Pécs, Hungary
Italy	Adriana Biagiotti	19 July 1947 (aged 21)	Prato, Italy
Italy	Daniela Maccelli	8 December 1949 (aged 18)	Barberino di Mugello, Italy
Italy	Gabriella Pozzuolo	28 November 1946 (aged 21)	Genoa, Italy
Japan	Kazue Hanyu	8 September 1950 (aged 18)	Fukui Prefecture, Japan
Japan	Kayoko Hashiguchi	26 April 1944 (aged 24)	Miyazaki Prefecture, Japan
Japan	Mitsuko Kandori	5 May 1943 (aged 25)	Tokyo, Japan
Japan	Miyuki Matsuhisa	15 August 1945 (aged 23)	Kyoko Prefecture, Japan
Japan	Taniko Mitsukuri	23 March 1943 (aged 25)	Niigata Prefecture, Japan
Japan	Chieko Oda	12 August 1947 (aged 21)	Nagasaki Prefecture, Japan
Mexico	Rosario Briones	5 October 1953 (aged 15)	San Luis Potosí, Mexico
Mexico	María Luisa Morales	21 June 1954 (aged 14)	Minatitlán, Mexico
Mexico	Rosalinda Puente	7 August 1953 (aged 15)	Mexico City, Mexico
Mexico	María Elena Ramírez	25 September 1951 (aged 17)	Mexico City, Mexico
Mexico	Laura Rivera	17 October 1954 (aged 13)	Mexico City, Mexico
Mexico	Julieta Sáenz	12 April 1954 (aged 14)	Mexico City, Mexico
Mongolia	Dorjiin Norolkhoo	31 December 1949 (aged 18)	Ulaanbaatar, Mongolia
Mongolia	Tsagaandorjiin Gündegmaa	6 February 1946 (aged 22)	Övörkhangai Province, Mongolia
Mongolia	Yadamsürengiin Tuyaa	6 November 1947 (aged 20)	Ulaanbaatar, Mongolia
Norway	Helga Braathen	5 March 1953 (aged 15)	Drammen, Norway
Norway	Unni Holmen	23 September 1952 (aged 16)	Oslo, Norway
Norway	Ann-Mari Hvaal	8 June 1944 (aged 24)	Sandefjord, Norway
Norway	Torunn Isberg	6 July 1949 (aged 19)	Moss, Norway
Norway	Jill Kvamme	20 August 1948 (aged 20)	Bergen, Norway
Norway	Wenche Sjong	27 April 1951 (aged 17)	Oslo, Norway
Poland	Małgorzata Chojnacka	20 September 1947 (aged 21)	Żochy, Poland
Poland	Halina Daniec	25 January 1949 (aged 19)	Świdnica, Poland
Poland	Wiesława Lech	20 October 1946 (aged 21)	Kraków, Poland
Poland	Łucja Ochmańska	17 July 1949 (aged 19)	Kraków, Poland
Poland	Grażyna Witkowska	22 June 1952 (aged 16)	Warsaw, Poland
Poland	Barbara Zięba	20 March 1952 (aged 16)	Kraków, Poland
Portugal	Esbela da Fonseca	26 July 1942 (aged 26)	Lisbon, Portugal
Soviet Union	Lyubov Burda	11 April 1953 (aged 15)	Voronezh, Russian SFSR
Soviet Union	Olga Karasyova	24 July 1949 (aged 19)	Bishkek, Kyrgyz SSR
Soviet Union	Natalia Kuchinskaya	8 March 1949 (aged 19)	Saint Petersburg, Russian SFSR
Soviet Union	Larisa Petrik	28 August 1949 (aged 19)	Dolinsk, Russian SFSR
Soviet Union	Ludmilla Tourischeva	7 October 1952 (aged 16)	Grozny, Russian SFSR
Soviet Union	Zinaida Voronina	10 December 1947 (aged 20)	Yoshkar-Ola, Russian SFSR
Sweden	Solveig Egman-Andersson	6 January 1942 (aged 26)	Arvika, Sweden
Sweden	Rose-Marie Holm	6 August 1953 (aged 15)	Landskrona, Sweden
Sweden	Marie Lundqvist	21 February 1947 (aged 21)	Västerås, Sweden
United States	Wendy Cluff	7 August 1951 (aged 17)	Los Angeles, California
United States	Kathy Gleason	8 March 1949 (aged 19)	Buffalo, New York
United States	Linda Metheny	12 August 1947 (aged 21)	Olney, Illinois
United States	Colleen Mulvihill	9 June 1952 (aged 16)	Merrill, Wisconsin
United States	Cathy Rigby	12 December 1952 (aged 15)	Long Beach, California
United States	Joyce Tanac	27 September 1950 (aged 18)	Seattle, Washington
West Germany	Petra Jebram	23 March 1954 (aged 14)	Wattenscheid, West Germany
West Germany	Angelika Kern	31 August 1952 (aged 16)	Emmendingen, West Germany
West Germany	Irmi Krauser	14 January 1948 (aged 20)	Straubing, West Germany
West Germany	Helga Matschkur	4 September 1943 (aged 25)	Ansbach, West Germany
West Germany	Marlies Stegemann	12 January 1951 (aged 17)	Wattenscheid, West Germany
West Germany	Anna Stein	21 October 1949 (aged 18)	Novi Sad, Yugoslavia
Yugoslavia	Nataša Bajin-Šljepica	29 September 1945 (aged 23)	Belgrade, Yugoslavia

== Male artistic gymnasts ==
	Name	Country	Date of birth (Age)
Youngest competitor	Steve Hug	United States	20 May 1952 (aged 16)
Oldest competitor	Aleksander Rokosa	Poland	17 July 1936 (aged 32)

NOC	Name	Date of birth (Age)	Hometown
Algeria	Larbi Lazhari	3 July 1941 (aged 27)	Algiers, Algeria
Australia	Murray Chessell	1 June 1944 (aged 24)	Melbourne, Victoria
Bulgaria	Georgi Adamov	3 June 1939 (aged 29)	Sofia, Bulgaria
Bulgaria	Rumen Gabrovski	11 June 1946 (aged 22)	Haskovo, Bulgaria
Bulgaria	Bozhidar Ivanov	15 July 1943 (aged 25)	Ruse, Bulgaria
Bulgaria	Raycho Khristov	4 October 1945 (aged 23)	Haskovo, Bulgaria
Bulgaria	Ivan Kondev	29 January 1944 (aged 24)	Sliven, Bulgaria
Bulgaria	Stefan Zoev	19 January 1943 (aged 25)	Sofia, Bulgaria
Canada	Barry Brooker	19 July 1941 (aged 27)	Toronto, Ontario
Canada	Roger Dion	20 April 1938 (aged 30)	Quebec City, Quebec
Canada	Sid Jensen	11 August 1947 (aged 21)	Halifax, Nova Scotia
Canada	Gilbert Larose	13 September 1942 (aged 26)	Montreal, Quebec
Canada	Steve Mitruk	17 January 1947 (aged 21)	Hamilton, Ontario
Chinese Taipei	Cheng Fu	19 June 1946 (aged 22)	Chinchiang, Taiwan
Chinese Taipei	Lai Chu-Long	10 March 1942 (aged 26)	Changhua, Taiwan
Cuba	Luis Navarrete	13 January 1948 (aged 20)	Havana, Cuba
Cuba	Roberto Pumpido	15 December 1948 (aged 19)	Havana, Cuba
Cuba	Héctor Ramírez	31 January 1943 (aged 25)	Havana, Cuba
Cuba	Luis Ramírez	13 January 1948 (aged 20)	Havana, Cuba
Cuba	Jorge Rodríguez	18 April 1948 (aged 20)	Havana, Cuba
Cuba	Octavio Suárez	26 July 1944 (aged 24)	Havana, Cuba
Czechoslovakia	František Bočko	9 July 1941 (aged 27)	Veľké Čaníkovce, Czechoslovakia
Czechoslovakia	Jiří Fejtek	22 September 1946 (aged 22)	Prague, Czechoslovakia
Czechoslovakia	Václav Kubička	28 September 1939 (aged 29)	Písek, Czechoslovakia
Czechoslovakia	Bohumil Mudřík	3 December 1941 (aged 26)	Zlín, Czechoslovakia
Czechoslovakia	Miloslav Netušil	20 February 1946 (aged 22)	Chomutov, Czechoslovakia
Czechoslovakia	Václav Skoumal	28 May 1944 (aged 24)	Zlín, Czechoslovakia
Denmark	Hans Peter Nielsen	4 March 1943 (aged 25)	Esbjerg, Denmark
Denmark	Arne Thomsen	1 March 1942 (aged 26)	Esbjerg, Denmark
East Germany	Günter Beier	2 March 1942 (aged 26)	Altenburg, Germany
East Germany	Matthias Brehme	7 February 1943 (aged 25)	Markkleeberg, East Germany
East Germany	Gerhard Dietrich	12 May 1942 (aged 26)	Brandenburg an der Havel, East Germany
East Germany	Siegfried Fülle	6 October 1939 (aged 29)	Greiz, East Germany
East Germany	Klaus Köste	27 February 1943 (aged 25)	Frankfurt an der Oder, East Germany
East Germany	Peter Weber	22 December 1938 (aged 29)	Finsterwalde, East Germany
Ecuador	Sergio Luna	9 September 1948 (aged 20)	San Gabriel, Ecuador
Ecuador	Eduardo Nájera	27 September 1948 (aged 20)	Quito, Ecuador
Ecuador	Pedro Rendón	27 April 1941 (aged 27)	Guayaquil, Ecuador
Finland	Reino Heino	28 June 1941 (aged 27)	Tampere, Finland
Finland	Olli Laiho	18 February 1943 (aged 25)	Savonlinna, Finland
Finland	Mauno Nissinen	16 August 1947 (aged 21)	Oulu, Finland
Finland	Juhani Rahikainen	26 June 1944 (aged 24)	Mikkeli, Finland
Finland	Hannu Rantakari	8 January 1939 (aged 29)	Tampere, Finland
Finland	Heikki Sappinen	5 October 1946 (aged 22)	Turku, Finland
France	Michel Bouchonnet	17 July 1940 (aged 28)	Reuilly, France
France	Christian Deuza	3 January 1944 (aged 24)	Boulogne-sur-Mer, France
France	Christian Guiffroy	21 January 1941 (aged 27)	Toulouse, France
Great Britain	Michael Booth	20 January 1946 (aged 22)	Huddersfield, England
Great Britain	Stan Wild	19 February 1944 (aged 24)	Bolton upon Dearne, England
Hungary	István Aranyos	25 April 1942 (aged 26)	Budapest, Hungary
Hungary	Dezső Bordán	26 June 1943 (aged 25)	Eger, Hungary
Hungary	Béla Herczeg	13 June 1947 (aged 21)	Debrecen, Hungary
Hungary	Sándor Kiss	23 April 1941 (aged 27)	Tura, Hungary
Hungary	Konrád Mentsik	19 April 1942 (aged 26)	Budapest, Hungary
Hungary	Endre Tihanyi	29 January 1945 (aged 23)	Budapest, Hungary
Italy	Giovanni Carminucci	14 November 1939 (aged 28)	San Benedetto del Tronto, Italy
Italy	Pasquale Carminucci	29 August 1937 (aged 31)	San Benedetto del Tronto, Italy
Italy	Luigi Cimnaghi	10 August 1940 (aged 28)	Meda, Italy
Italy	Bruno Franceschetti	30 April 1941 (aged 27)	Minerbe, Italy
Italy	Franco Menichelli	3 August 1941 (aged 27)	Rome, Italy
Italy	Vincenzo Mori	25 December 1946 (aged 21)	Taranto, Italy
Japan	Yukio Endō	18 January 1937 (aged 31)	Akita, Japan
Japan	Sawao Katō	11 October 1946 (aged 22)	Gosen, Japan
Japan	Takeshi Katō	25 September 1942 (aged 26)	Aichi Prefecture, Japan
Japan	Eizo Kenmotsu	13 February 1948 (aged 20)	Okayama Prefecture, Japan
Japan	Akinori Nakayama	1 March 1943 (aged 25)	Nagoya, Japan
Japan	Mitsuo Tsukahara	22 December 1947 (aged 20)	Tokyo, Japan
Mexico	Enrique García	15 July 1943 (aged 25)	Chihuahua, Mexico
Mexico	José González	15 January 1946 (aged 22)	Tlaxcala, Mexico
Mexico	Rogelio Mendoza	2 May 1944 (aged 24)	Mexico City, Mexico
Mexico	Armando Valles	6 May 1941 (aged 27)	Mexico City, Mexico
Mexico	Fernando Valles	9 October 1944 (aged 24)	Mexico City, Mexico
Mexico	José Vilchis	30 September 1950 (aged 18)	Mexico City, Mexico
Mongolia	Zagdbazaryn Davaanyam	15 December 1944 (aged 23)	Ulaanbaatar, Mongolia
Philippines	Ernesto Beren	28 February 1950 (aged 18)	Manila, Philippines
Philippines	Norman Henson	3 March 1950 (aged 18)	Arayat, Philippines
Poland	Andrzej Gonera	18 February 1939 (aged 29)	Toruń, Poland
Poland	Jerzy Kruża	29 November 1943 (aged 24)	Ruda Śląska, Poland
Poland	Mikołaj Kubica	27 October 1945 (aged 22)	Niedobczyce, Poland
Poland	Sylwester Kubica	28 December 1949 (aged 18)	Niedobczyce, Poland
Poland	Wilhelm Kubica	29 December 1943 (aged 24)	Niedobczyce, Poland
Poland	Aleksander Rokosa	17 July 1936 (aged 32)	Brzeziny, Poland
Portugal	José Filipe Abreu	28 March 1948 (aged 20)	Lisbon, Portugal
South Korea	Kim Chung-tae	16 January 1944 (aged 24)	Seoul, South Korea
Soviet Union	Sergey Diomidov	9 July 1943 (aged 25)	Turtkul, Uzbek SSR
Soviet Union	Valery Ilyinykh	7 August 1947 (aged 21)	Nobosibirsk, Russian SFSR
Soviet Union	Valery Karasyov	23 September 1946 (aged 22)	Moscow, Russian SFSR
Soviet Union	Viktor Klimenko	25 February 1949 (aged 19)	Moscow, Russian SFSR
Soviet Union	Viktor Lisitsky	18 October 1939 (aged 28)	Magnitogorsk, Russian SFSR
Soviet Union	Mikhail Voronin	26 March 1945 (aged 23)	Moscow, Russian SFSR
Sweden	Finn Johannesson	30 November 1943 (aged 24)	Copenhagen, Denmark
Sweden	Christer Jönsson	16 August 1943 (aged 25)	Helsingborg, Sweden
Sweden	Evert Lindgren	26 February 1938 (aged 30)	Gothenburg, Sweden
Switzerland	Meinrad Berchtold	2 December 1943 (aged 24)	Baden, Switzerland
Switzerland	Hans Ettlin	10 March 1945 (aged 23)	Kerns, Switzerland
Switzerland	Edwin Greutmann	14 October 1946 (aged 21)	Beggingen, Switzerland
Switzerland	Roland Hürzeler	17 March 1945 (aged 23)	Uerkheim, Switzerland
Switzerland	Paul Müller	21 January 1946 (aged 22)	Udligenswil, Switzerland
Switzerland	Peter Rohner	12 April 1949 (aged 19)	St. Gallen, Switzerland
United States	Kanati Allen	25 January 1947 (aged 21)	Los Angeles, California
United States	Steve Cohen	28 April 1946 (aged 22)	Philadelphia, Pennsylvania
United States	Sid Freudenstein	18 May 1945 (aged 23)	New Orleans, Louisiana
United States	Steve Hug	20 May 1952 (aged 16)	Highland, Illinois
United States	Fred Roethlisberger	28 February 1943 (aged 25)	Milwaukee, Wisconsin
United States	Dave Thor	20 February 1947 (aged 21)	Van Nuys, California
West Germany	Heinz Häussler	7 November 1940 (aged 27)	Lindau, West Germany
West Germany	Erich Hess	20 June 1947 (aged 21)	Mannheim, West Germany
West Germany	Hermann Höpfner	11 September 1945 (aged 23)	Bad Dürkheim, West Germany
West Germany	Willi Jaschek	2 September 1940 (aged 28)	Olomouc, Czechoslovakia
West Germany	Heiko Reinemer	14 June 1945 (aged 23)	Bierstadt, West Germany
West Germany	Helmut Tepasse	24 November 1946 (aged 21)	Essen, West Germany
Yugoslavia	Damir Anić	24 July 1944 (aged 24)	Zagreb, Yugoslavia
Yugoslavia	Janez Brodnik	6 May 1944 (aged 24)	Golnik, Yugoslavia
Yugoslavia	Miroslav Cerar	28 October 1939 (aged 28)	Ljubljana, Yugoslavia
Yugoslavia	Milenko Kersnić	21 June 1946 (aged 22)	Ljubljana, Yugoslavia
Yugoslavia	Martin Šrot	10 August 1938 (aged 30)	Celje, Yugoslavia
Yugoslavia	Miloš Vratič	11 May 1948 (aged 20)	Ljubljana, Yugoslavia
