= Gymnastics at the 1968 Summer Olympics – Women's uneven bars =

Women's uneven bars at the Games of the XIX Olympiad
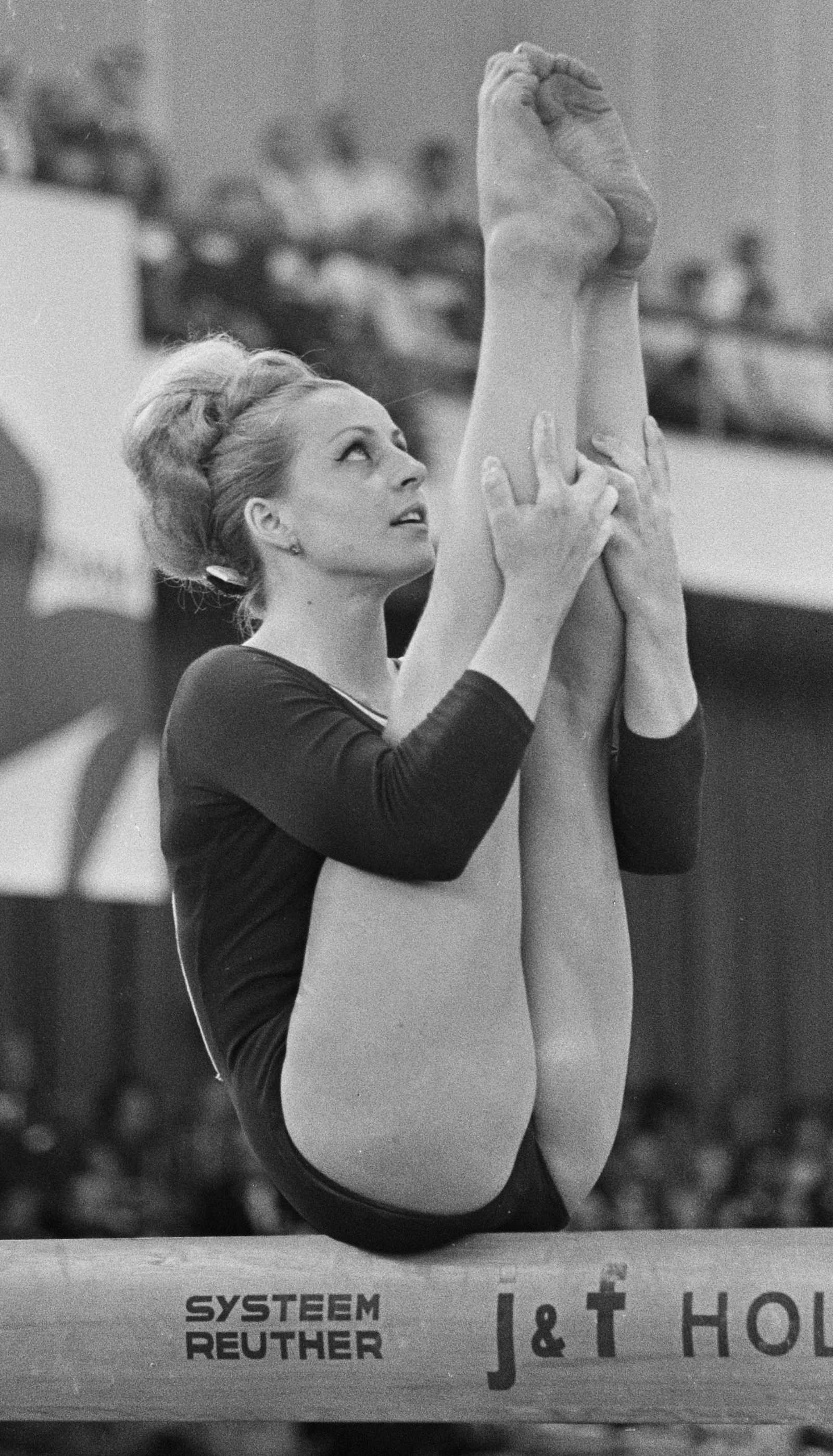
- Gold medalist Věra Čáslavská (1967)
- Venue: Auditorio Nacional
- Date: 21–25 October 1968
- Competitors: 101 from 28 nations
- Winning score: 19.650

Medalists
1st place, gold medalist(s)		Věra Čáslavská	Czechoslovakia
2nd place, silver medalist(s)		Karin Janz	East Germany
3rd place, bronze medalist(s)		Zinaida Voronina	Soviet Union

These are the results of the women's uneven bars competition, one of six events for female competitors in artistic gymnastics at the 1968 Summer Olympics in Mexico City.

== Competition format ==
Each nation entered a team of six gymnasts or up to three individual gymnasts. All entrants in the gymnastics competitions performed both a compulsory exercise and a voluntary exercise for each apparatus. The scores for all 8 exercises were summed to give an individual all-around score.

These exercise scores were also used for qualification for the new apparatus finals. The two exercises (compulsory and voluntary) for each apparatus were summed to give an apparatus score; the top 6 in each apparatus participated in the finals; others were ranked 7th through 101st. In the final, each gymnast performed an additional voluntary exercise; half of the score from the preliminary carried over.

== Results ==
Rank	Gymnast	Nation	Preliminary			Final		
Rank	Gymnast	Nation	Compulsory	Voluntary	Total	1/2 Prelim.	Final	Total
1st place, gold medalist(s)	Věra Čáslavská	Czechoslovakia	9.60	9.90	19.50	9.750	9.900	19.650
2nd place, silver medalist(s)	Karin Janz	East Germany	9.60	9.70	19.30	9.650	9.850	19.500
3rd place, bronze medalist(s)	Zinaida Voronina	Soviet Union	9.55	9.70	19.25	9.625	9.800	19.425
4	Bohumila Řimnáčová	Czechoslovakia	9.50	9.80	19.30	9.650	9.700	19.350
5	Erika Zuchold	East Germany	9.45	9.60	19.05	9.525	9.800	19.325
6	Miroslava Skleničková	Czechoslovakia	9.45	9.65	19.10	9.550	8.650	18.200
7	Kazue Hanyu	Japan	9.30	9.70	19.00	did not advance		
7	Olga Karasyova	Soviet Union	9.40	9.60	19.00	did not advance		
7	Taniko Mitsukuri	Japan	9.45	9.55	19.00	did not advance		
10	Evelyne Letourneur	France	9.50	9.45	18.95	did not advance		
10	Larisa Petrik	Soviet Union	9.45	9.50	18.95	did not advance		
12	Hana Lišková	Czechoslovakia	9.35	9.55	18.90	did not advance		
12	Katalin Makray	Hungary	9.45	9.45	18.90	did not advance		
12	Cathy Rigby	United States	9.40	9.50	18.90	did not advance		
12	Ludmilla Tourischeva	Soviet Union	9.40	9.50	18.90	did not advance		
16	Magdalena Schmidt	East Germany	9.40	9.45	18.85	did not advance		
17	Ágnes Bánfai	Hungary	9.30	9.50	18.80	did not advance		
17	Maritta Bauerschmidt	East Germany	9.30	9.50	18.80	did not advance		
17	Ute Starke	East Germany	9.35	9.45	18.80	did not advance		
20	Chieko Oda	Japan	9.25	9.50	18.75	did not advance		
21	Mitsuko Kandori	Japan	9.30	9.40	18.70	did not advance		
21	Marianna Krajčírová	Czechoslovakia	8.95	9.75	18.70	did not advance		
23	Mariya Karashka	Bulgaria	9.35	9.30	18.65	did not advance		
24	Irmi Krauser	West Germany	9.10	9.40	18.50	did not advance		
24	Colleen Mulvihill	United States	9.20	9.30	18.50	did not advance		
26	Jacqueline Brisepierre	France	9.15	9.30	18.45	did not advance		
27	Joyce Tanac	United States	9.20	9.20	18.40	did not advance		
28	Jana Kubičková-Posnerová	Czechoslovakia	8.85	9.50	18.35	did not advance		
29	Anikó Ducza	Hungary	9.15	9.15	18.30	did not advance		
29	Kathy Gleason	United States	9.00	9.30	18.30	did not advance		
31	Nicole Bourdiau	France	8.95	9.25	18.20	did not advance		
31	Natalija Sljepica	Yugoslavia	9.20	9.00	18.20	did not advance		
31	Anna Stein	West Germany	8.85	9.35	18.20	did not advance		
34	Petra Jebram	West Germany	8.85	9.30	18.15	did not advance		
34	Vanya Marinova	Bulgaria	8.90	9.25	18.15	did not advance		
34	Linda Metheny	United States	9.40	8.75	18.15	did not advance		
37	Natalia Kuchinskaya	Soviet Union	8.45	9.65	18.10	did not advance		
37	Grażyna Witkowska	Poland	9.15	8.95	18.10	did not advance		
39	Angelika Kern	West Germany	8.90	9.15	18.05	did not advance		
39	Wiesława Lech	Poland	9.15	8.90	18.05	did not advance		
39	Helga Matschkur	West Germany	8.90	9.15	18.05	did not advance		
39	Miyuki Matsuhisa	Japan	8.65	9.40	18.05	did not advance		
43	Rose-Marie Holm	Sweden	8.75	9.20	17.95	did not advance		
44	Łucja Ochmańska	Poland	8.75	9.10	17.85	did not advance		
45	Halina Daniec	Poland	8.80	9.00	17.80	did not advance		
46	Wendy Cluff	United States	8.75	9.00	17.75	did not advance		
47	Adriana Biagiotti	Italy	8.70	9.00	17.70	did not advance		
47	Jennifer Diachun	Canada	8.70	9.00	17.70	did not advance		
47	Solveig Egman-Andersson	Sweden	8.90	8.80	17.70	did not advance		
47	Barbara Zięba	Poland	9.05	8.65	17.70	did not advance		
51	Lyubov Burda	Soviet Union	9.30	8.35	17.65	did not advance		
52	Katalin Müller	Hungary	8.20	9.40	17.60	did not advance		
52	Marianne Noack	East Germany	8.20	9.40	17.60	did not advance		
52	Françoise Nourry	France	8.65	8.95	17.60	did not advance		
55	Marie Lundqvist	Sweden	8.70	8.80	17.50	did not advance		
55	Márta Tolnai	Hungary	8.25	9.25	17.50	did not advance		
55	Gondegmaa Tsagaandorj	Mongolia	8.75	8.75	17.50	did not advance		
58	Dominique Lauvard	France	9.10	8.35	17.45	did not advance		
58	Gabriella Pozzuolo	Italy	8.60	8.85	17.45	did not advance		
58	Miriam Villacian	Cuba	8.65	8.80	17.45	did not advance		
61	Ilona Békési	Hungary	8.50	8.85	17.35	did not advance		
61	Zulema Bregado	Cuba	8.55	8.80	17.35	did not advance		
61	Małgorzata Chojnacka	Poland	8.50	8.85	17.35	did not advance		
61	Suzanne Cloutier	Canada	8.40	8.95	17.35	did not advance		
61	Marie-Luise Stegemann	West Germany	9.00	8.35	17.35	did not advance		
66	Vesela Pasheva	Bulgaria	8.55	8.75	17.30	did not advance		
67	Tuiaa Iadamsurenglin	Mongolia	8.45	8.80	17.25	did not advance		
68	Kayoko Hashiguchi	Japan	7.85	9.35	17.20	did not advance		
69	Margaret Bell	Great Britain	8.60	8.50	17.10	did not advance		
69	Mireille Cayre	France	9.10	8.00	17.10	did not advance		
71	Helga Braathen	Norway	8.10	8.90	17.00	did not advance		
72	Esbela da Fonseca	Portugal	8.40	8.55	16.95	did not advance		
72	Luisa Morales	Mexico	8.40	8.55	16.95	did not advance		
74	Rayna Atanasova	Bulgaria	7.95	8.90	16.85	did not advance		
74	Daniela Maccelli	Italy	8.45	8.40	16.85	did not advance		
76	Julietta Saenz de Secilia	Mexico	8.25	8.45	16.70	did not advance		
76	Neli Stoyanova	Bulgaria	9.00	7.70	16.70	did not advance		
78	Valerie Norris	Australia	8.00	8.60	16.60	did not advance		
79	Horta Van Hoye	Belgium	7.60	8.80	16.40	did not advance		
80	Laura Rivera	Mexico	7.80	8.50	16.30	did not advance		
81	Sandra Hartley	Canada	7.75	8.50	16.25	did not advance		
82	Jill Kvamme	Norway	8.30	7.90	16.20	did not advance		
83	Theresa McDonnell	Canada	8.15	7.90	16.05	did not advance		
84	Nancy Aldama	Cuba	8.40	7.60	16.00	did not advance		
84	Torunn Isberg	Norway	7.90	8.10	16.00	did not advance		
84	Else Trangbaek	Denmark	7.30	8.70	16.00	did not advance		
87	Marilynn Minaker	Canada	8.15	7.70	15.85	did not advance		
88	Rosalinda Puente	Mexico	7.35	8.45	15.80	did not advance		
89	Christiane Goethals	Belgium	8.30	7.40	15.70	did not advance		
89	Unni Holmen	Norway	7.60	8.10	15.70	did not advance		
91	Rosario Briones	Mexico	7.25	8.40	15.65	did not advance		
91	Yolanda Vega	Cuba	6.90	8.75	15.65	did not advance		
93	Mary Prestidge	Great Britain	7.95	7.30	15.25	did not advance		
94	Ann-Mari Hvaal	Norway	6.90	8.20	15.10	did not advance		
94	Wenche Sjong	Norway	7.75	7.35	15.10	did not advance		
96	Elena Ramirez	Mexico	5.95	8.50	14.45	did not advance		
97	Suzette Blanco	Cuba	5.80	7.10	12.90	did not advance		
98	Nereida Bauta	Cuba	4.75	8.00	12.75	did not advance		
99	Hong Tai-kwai	Chinese Taipei	6.10	6.30	12.40	did not advance		
100	Norikhoo Dorj	Mongolia	4.00	7.95	11.95	did not advance		
101	Yu Mai-Lee	Chinese Taipei	6.15	4.25	10.40	did not advance		
