= Gymnastics at the 1968 Summer Olympics – Women's artistic team all-around =

Women's artistic team all-around at the Games of the XIX Olympiad
- Venue: National Auditorium
- Date: 21 and 23 October 1968

Medalists
1st place, gold medalist(s)		Lyubov Burda, Olga Karasyova, Natalia Kuchinskaya, Larisa Petrik, Ludmilla Tourischeva, Zinaida Voronina	Soviet Union
2nd place, silver medalist(s)		Věra Čáslavská, Marianna Krajčírová, Jána Kubičková, Hana Lišková, Bohumila Řimnáčová, Miroslava Skleničková	Czechoslovakia
3rd place, bronze medalist(s)		Maritta Bauerschmidt, Karin Janz, Marianne Noack, Magdalena Schmidt, Ute Starke, Erika Zuchold	East Germany

The women's team competition was a gymnastics event contested as part of the Gymnastics at the 1968 Summer Olympics programme at the National Auditorium in Mexico City.

== Results ==
The score for each team was the sum of its six members' best scores. On each of the four apparatuses, the top five scores in each category (compulsory and optional) were counted, for a total of 10 scores per apparatus. The maximum possible team score was 400.

Rank	Team	Vault			Uneven Bars			Balance Beam			Floor			Total	Rank
Rank	Team	C	O	Rank	C	O	Rank	C	O	Rank	C	O	Rank	Total	Rank
Gold medal	Soviet Union	96.150		2	94.200		1	94.950		1	98.300		1	382.850	
Gold medal	Zinaida Voronina	9.750	9.650	5	9.550	9.700	6	9.400	9.400	7	9.650	9.750	4	76.850	2
Gold medal	Natalia Kuchinskaya	9.750	9.700	2	8.450	9.650	12	9.800	9.800	1	9.750	9.850	3	76.750	3
Gold medal	Larisa Petrik	9.700	9.500	7	9.450	9.500	8	9.500	9.500	6	9.700	9.850	1	76.700	4
Gold medal	Olga Karasyova	9.650	9.500		9.400	9.600		9.300	9.400		9.700	9.850	5	76.000	7
Gold medal	Ludmilla Tourischeva	9.600	9.250		9.400	9.500		9.300	8.450		9.500	9.500		74.500	24
Gold medal	Lyubov Burda	9.600	9.350		9.300	8.350		9.500	9.350		9.350	9.400		74.200	25
Silver medal	Czechoslovakia	97.100		1	96.700		2	93.500		2	95.500		3	382.200	
Silver medal	Věra Čáslavská	9.900	9.850	1	9.600	9.900	1	9.650	9.800	2	9.700	9.850	1	78.250	1
Silver medal	Bohumila Řimnáčová	9.550	9.150	10	9.500	9.800	6	9.450	9.400	11	9.500	9.650	7	76.000	7
Silver medal	Miroslava Skleničková	9.700	9.650	4	9.450	9.650	6	9.300	9.300	12	9.400	9.400	17	75.850	9
Silver medal	Marianna Krajčírová	9.750	9.700	3	8.950	9.750	26	9.350	9.300	15	9.550	9.550	16	75.850	9
Silver medal	Hana Lišková	9.600	9.400	11	9.350	9.550	13	9.450	9.400	16	9.400	9.500	14	75.650	11
Silver medal	Jana Kubičková	9.600	9.400	11	8.850	9.500	47	9.300	9.400	24	9.500	9.500	17	75.050	15
Bronze medal	East Germany	95.750		2	97.800		3	93.850		3	96.350		2	379.100	
Bronze medal	Erika Zuchold	9.800	9.850	2	9.450	9.600	5	9.450	9.550	6	9.500	9.500	13	76.700	4
Bronze medal	Karin Janz	9.700	9.500	8	9.600	9.700	3	9.450	9.600	4	9.500	9.500	8	76.550	6
Bronze medal	Maritta Bauerschmidt	9.450	9.450	15	9.300	9.500	14	9.500	9.450	12	9.400	9.400	10	75.450	12
Bronze medal	Ute Starke	9.600	9.550	11	9.350	9.450	17	9.200	9.000	37	9.250	9.250	22	74.650	22
Bronze medal	Marianne Noack	9.500	9.500	12	8.200	9.400	62	9.450	9.400	14	9.350	9.300	17	74.100	27
Bronze medal	Magdalena Schmidt	9.650	9.650	9	9.400	9.450	13	9.100	8.200	53	9.250	9.250	24	73.950	29
4	Japan	94.500		5	95.300		4	93.700		4	94.500		4	375.450	
4	Kazue Hanyu	9.500	9.400	12	9.300	9.700	12	9.350	9.400	12	9.350	9.300	9	75.300	13
4	Miyuki Matsuhisa	9.550	9.550	9	8.650	9.400	29	9.500	9.400	12	9.400	9.450	27	74.900	17
4	Taniko Mitsukuri	9.550	8.850	62	9.450	9.550	20	9.350	9.250	12	9.400	9.450	14	74.850	18
4	Chieko Oda	9.400	9.500	19	9.250	9.500	16	9.250	9.050	25	9.450	9.400	28	74.800	19
4	Mitsuko Kandori	9.350	9.500	14	9.300	9.400	17	9.350	9.250	33	9.250	9.250	31	74.650	22
4	Kayoko Hashiguchi	9.350	9.200	29	7.850	9.350	72	9.350	9.250	26	9.300	9.500	10	73.150	34
5	Hungary	93.700		5	95.100		6	93.250		5	95.800		5	369.800	
5	Ágnes Bánfai	9.300	9.400	59	9.300	9.500	6	9.500	9.350	12	9.450	9.300	45	75.100	14
5	Anikó Ducza	9.500	9.350	10	9.150	9.150	27	9.500	9.200	14	9.500	9.450	12	74.800	19
5	Katalin Makray	9.350	9.300	15	9.450	9.450	12	9.250	9.100	13	9.100	9.150	23	74.150	26
5	Márta Tolnai	9.200	9.200	13	8.250	9.250	56	9.100	9.200	27	9.100	9.150	16	72.450	36
5	Katalin Müller	9.250	8.950	19	8.200	9.400	68	9.450	8.350	89	9.350	9.200	15	72.150	38
5	Ilona Békési	9.250	8.850	13	8.500	8.850	93	9.200	9.050	72	9.050	9.100	78	71.850	39
6	United States	93.500		6	92.200		6	92.500		6	93.700		6	369.750	
6	Cathy Rigby	9.200	9.100	13	9.400	9.500	45	9.550	9.450	14	9.450	9.300	12	74.950	16
6	Linda Metheny	9.350	9.050	12	9.400	8.750	47	9.600	9.550	5	9.300	9.000	48	74.000	28
6	Joyce Tanac	9.250	9.200	14	9.200	9.200	15	9.250	9.200	15	9.250	9.100	18	73.650	30
6	Kathy Gleason	9.200	9.300	60	9.000	9.300	16	9.150	9.300	14	9.200	9.050	17	73.300	31
6	Colleen Mulvihill	8.950	8.900	63	9.200	9.300	67	9.400	9.300	12	9.150	8.850	83	73.050	35
6	Wendy Cluff	9.050	8.750	67	8.750	9.000	56	9.200	9.000	46	9.100	8.950	14	71.800	40
7	France	94.500		7	92.300		7	93.300		7	91.300		7	361.750	
7	Evelyne Letourneur	9.400	8.950	27	9.500	9.450	86	9.500	9.250	68	9.300	9.450	67	74.800	19
7	Jacqueline Brisepierre	9.250	8.950	26	9.150	9.300	16	9.200	8.750	45	9.000	8.850	86	72.450	36
7	Mireille Cayre	9.400	9.350	35	9.100	8.000	36	8.950	8.800	57	9.050	9.050	47	71.750	40
7	Françoise Nourry	8.750	8.400	96	8.650	8.950	74	9.150	8.600	45	9.200	9.050	45	70.750	46
7	Dominique Lauvard	8.850	8.450	45	9.100	8.350	67	9.050	7.950	96	9.150	9.250	45	70.150	57
7	Nicole Bourdiau	8.750	8.650	95	8.950	9.250	41	8.750	6.800	98	9.000	8.950	45	69.050	68
8	Bulgaria	91.150		7	93.450		2	92.500		8	92.450		8	355.100	
8	Mariya Karashka	9.450	9.250	12	9.350	9.300	61	8.800	9.250	27	8.800	9.100	77	73.300	31
8	Vanya Marinova	9.100	9.150	55	8.900	9.250	45	7.350	9.300	66	9.000	9.250	78	71.300	45
8	Vesela Pasheva	8.900	8.850	87	8.550	8.750	75	8.750	8.950	45	8.750	8.950	99	70.450	53
8	Neli Stoyanova	8.900	8.950	75	9.000	7.700	98	8.950	9.250	78	8.800	8.900	91	70.450	53
8	Rayna Atanasova	9.000	8.850	47	7.950	8.900	45	8.600	8.400	78	8.900	9.000	45	69.600	65
9	West Germany	93.600		9	90.000		9	91.250		9	92.500		9	354.650	
9	Angelika Kern	9.100	8.900	45	8.900	9.150	15	8.500	9.000	90	8.750	9.050	45	71.350	44
9	Irmi Krauser	9.300	9.000	77	9.100	9.400	40	8.500	7.900	45	8.800	9.200	45	71.200	47
9	Marlies Stegemann	9.400	9.000	25	9.000	8.350	60	8.650	8.050	25	8.900	9.200	67	70.550	50
9	Petra Jebram	9.050	8.850	45	8.850	9.300	68	8.800	7.650	47	8.700	9.100	80	70.300	59
9	Anna Stein	9.200	8.650	67	8.850	9.350	60	8.500	7.350	45	8.700	9.050	45	70.000	62
9	Helga Matschkur	9.150	8.500	45	8.900	9.150	45	8.750	7.700	77	8.600	9.000	62	69.750	65
10	Poland	90.750		10	93.700		10	91.500		10	93.350		10	353.850	
10	Łucja Ochmańska	9.350	8.700	70	8.750	9.100	80	8.800	9.000	87	8.950	9.050	45	71.750	41
10	Wiesława Lech	8.950	8.600	65	9.150	8.900	37	9.050	8.950	47	8.900	9.050	77	71.550	42
10	Barbara Zięba	9.050	8.850	65	9.050	8.650	45	8.450	9.100	45	8.700	8.950	56	70.750	46
10	Grażyna Witkowska	8.750	8.650	45	9.150	8.950	78	8.750	8.050	88	8.950	9.050	63	70.300	55
10	Halina Daniec	8.900	8.800	88	8.800	9.000	55	8.500	7.450	45	8.600	9.150	78	69.200	67
10	Małgorzata Chojnacka	8.350	8.400	45	8.500	8.850	45	8.450	7.200	12	8.650	8.950	95	67.350	82
11	Canada	93.700		11	90.000		11	91.250		11	91.300		11	343.400	
11	Jennifer Diachun	9.200	8.850	56	8.700	9.000	90	8.900	8.100	45	8.650	9.050	54	70.450	51
11	Sandra Hartley	9.100	8.650	65	7.750	8.500	45	8.950	8.900	90	8.900	9.000	76	69.750	62
11	Teresa McDonnell	8.850	8.550	63	8.150	7.900	45	7.950	9.050	93	8.800	8.950	67	68.200	71
11	Marilynn Minaker	8.600	8.600	92	8.150	7.700	45	8.350	9.050	14	8.550	8.600	62	67.600	79
11	Suzanne Cloutier	8.900	8.450	75	8.400	8.950	47	8.250	7.250	93	8.650	8.550	55	67.400	81
12	Norway	93.550		12	92.300		12	92.300		12	92.300		12	338.150	
12	Helga Braathen	8.800	8.650	65	8.100	8.900	95	8.350	9.200	27	8.550	8.650	63	69.200	67
12	Jill Kvamme	8.750	8.500	55	8.300	7.900	45	8.200	9.050	63	8.550	8.550	45	67.800	77
12	Torunn Isberg	8.650	8.350	65	7.900	8.100	96	7.900	9.100	63	8.650	8.900	81	67.550	80
12	Wenche Sjong	8.800	8.300	78	7.750	7.350	86	8.450	8.950	53	8.400	8.450	23	66.450	86
12	Unni Holmen	8.950	8.450	66	7.600	8.100	83	8.050	7.700	75	8.550	8.300	45	65.700	87
12	Ann-Mari Hvaal	8.900	8.600	64	6.900	8.200	102	7.400	7.500	99	7.950	8.350	96	63.800	89
13	Cuba	90.500		13	90.500		13	90.300		13	90.350		13	332.850	
13	Miriam Villacián	8.400	8.450	93	8.650	8.800	92	8.000	8.500	25	8.200	8.800	93	68.100	72
13	Zulema Bregado	8.000	7.600	45	8.550	8.800	41	8.700	8.300	96	8.950	9.150	78	68.050	73
13	Nancy Aldama	8.150	8.000	45	8.400	7.600	65	8.700	8.800	71	8.350	9.050	55	67.000	83
13	Nereida Bauta	8.400	7.800	53	4.750	8.000	125	8.000	8.550	92	8.450	8.900	83	62.850	91
13	Suzette Blanco	7.900	8.300	89	5.800	7.100	133	8.250	8.550	45	8.200	8.750	66	62.850	91
13	Yolanda Vega	7.500	6.600	125	6.900	8.750	109	8.200	6.650	98	8.050	8.550	125	61.200	95
14	Mexico	93.600		14	90.500		14	93.600		14	90.500		14	311.250	
14	Julieta Sáenz	7.950	8.000	15	8.250	8.450	14	7.700	6.650	65	8.400	8.250	14	63.750	90
14	María Luisa Morales	7.850	7.350	13	8.400	8.550	14	7.050	6.850	13	8.250	8.400	14	62.700	93
14	María Elena Ramírez	7.850	7.850	85	5.950	8.500	112	7.750	7.700	95	8.300	8.250	97	61.550	94
14	Rosario Briones	7.900	7.900	80	7.250	8.400	46	6.300	6.400	137	8.400	8.300	17	60.850	96
14	Laura Rivera	6.700	5.750	45	7.800	8.500	67	7.850	6.050	93	8.550	8.150	110	59.350	98
14	Rosalinda Puente	6.700	6.650	100	7.350	8.450	98	6.900	5.900	133	8.200	8.250	93	58.400	99
	Marie Lundqvist (SWE)	9.100	8.850	93	8.700	8.800	89	8.600	8.750	77	8.800	8.950	96	70.550	48
	Rose-Marie Holm (SWE)	8.850	9.150	83	8.750	9.200	92	8.850	8.150	95	8.800	8.750	97	70.500	
	Nataša Bajin-Šljepica (YUG)	9.150	8.850	96	9.200	9.000	93	8.550	7.700	73	8.850	9.050	96	70.350	
	Adriana Biagiotti (ITA)	9.150	9.050	45	8.700	9.000	57	9.000	8.050	72	8.600	8.550	77	70.100	
	Solveig Andersson (SWE)	9.100	9.000	45	8.900	8.800	37	8.300	8.400	73	8.700	8.800	81	70.000	
	Tsagaandorjiin Gündegmaa (MGL)	8.550	8.600	63	8.750	8.750	45	8.850	9.250	45	8.600	8.650	96	70.000	
	Gabriella Pozzuolo (ITA)	8.950	8.800	87	8.600	8.850	37	8.950	8.150	96	8.800	8.550	36	69.650	
	Horta Van Hoye (BEL)	9.000	8.850	97	7.600	8.800	77	8.700	9.000	97	8.650	8.800	90	69.400	
	Valerie Norris (AUS)	8.850	8.950	87	8.000	8.600	86	8.050	8.700	67	8.550	8.900	76	68.600	
	Margaret Bell (GBR)	8.100	8.200	93	8.600	8.500	84	8.550	8.950	69	8.400	8.650	75	67.950	
	Christiane Goethals (BEL)	8.500	8.400	60	8.300	7.400	86	8.450	9.100	56	8.750	8.950	90	67.850	
	Else Trangbæk (DEN)	8.250	8.950	67	7.300	8.700	87	8.250	8.750	97	8.700	8.950	68	67.850	
	Daniela Maccelli (ITA)	9.050	8.900	85	8.450	8.400	67	8.700	7.100	98	8.650	8.550	90	67.800	
	Yadamsürengiin Tuyaa (MGL)	6.800	7.800	98	8.450	8.800	79	8.600	9.000	65	8.600	8.850	60	66.900	
	Esbela da Fonseca (POR)	8.950	8.400	84	8.400	8.550	90	7.550	7.900	92	8.400	8.550	83	66.700	
	Mary Prestidge (GBR)	9.250	8.050	93	7.950	7.300	97	8.250	8.500	77	8.550	8.750	88	65.600	
	Dorjiin Norolkhoo (MGL)	6.700	6.800	100	4.000	7.950	103	8.400	8.350	87	8.600	8.500	85	59.500	
	Yu Mai-Lee (TPE)	6.500	7.100	101	6.150	4.250	103	7.100	6.650	102	7.750	7.700	106	53.300	
	Hong Tai-Kwai (TPE)	6.350	5.750	106	6.100	6.300	102	8.050	4.650	107	7.750	7.700	100	52.650	
