= Gymnastics at the 1968 Summer Olympics – Women's artistic individual all-around =

Women's artistic individual all-around at the Games of the XIX Olympiad
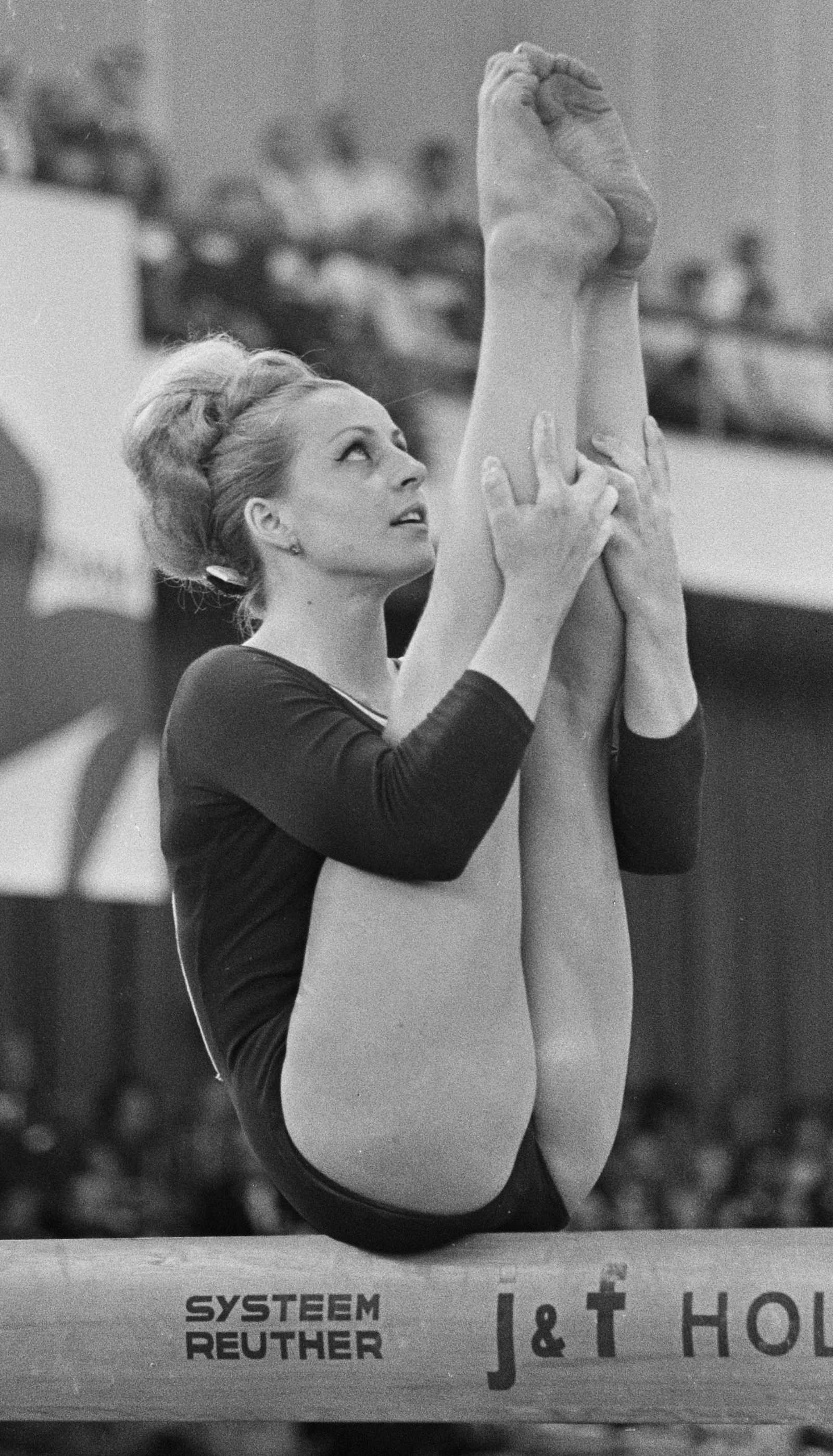
- Gold medalist Věra Čáslavská (1967)
- Venue: Auditorio Nacional
- Date: 21–23 October 1968
- Competitors: 101 from 28 nations
- Winning score: 78.25

Medalists
1st place, gold medalist(s)		Věra Čáslavská	Czechoslovakia
2nd place, silver medalist(s)		Zinaida Voronina	Soviet Union
3rd place, bronze medalist(s)		Natalia Kuchinskaya	Soviet Union

These are the results of the women's individual all-around competition, one of six events for female competitors in artistic gymnastics at the 1968 Summer Olympics in Mexico City.

== Competition format ==
Each nation entered a team of six gymnasts or up to three individual gymnasts. All entrants in the gymnastics competitions performed both a compulsory exercise and a voluntary exercise for each apparatus. The scores for all 8 exercises were summed to give an individual all-around score.

These exercise scores were also used for qualification for the new apparatus finals. The two exercises (compulsory and voluntary) for each apparatus were summed to give an apparatus score; the top 6 in each apparatus participated in the finals; others were ranked 7th through 101st. In the final, each gymnast performed the compulsory and voluntary exercises again; scores from the preliminary did not carry over.

== Results ==
Rank	Gymnast	Nation	Apparatus results																Total
Rank	Gymnast	Nation	Vault (gymnastics)				Uneven bars				Balance beam				Floor (gymnastics)				Total
Rank	Gymnast	Nation	C	V	Score	Rank	C	V	Score	Rank	C	V	Score	Rank	C	V	Score	Rank	Total
1st place, gold medalist(s)	Věra Čáslavská	Czechoslovakia	9.90	9.85	19.75	1	9.60	9.90	19.50	1	9.65	9.80	19.45	2	9.70	9.85	19.55	2	78.25
2nd place, silver medalist(s)	Zinaida Voronina	Soviet Union	9.75	9.65	19.40	5	9.55	9.70	19.25	4	9.40	9.40	18.80	15	9.65	9.75	19.40	5	76.85
3rd place, bronze medalist(s)	Natalia Kuchinskaya	Soviet Union	9.75	9.70	19.45	3	8.45	9.65	18.10	37	9.80	9.80	19.60	1	9.75	9.85	19.60	1	76.75
4	Larisa Petrik	Soviet Union	9.70	9.50	19.20	8	9.45	9.50	18.95	10	9.50	9.50	19.00	5	9.70	9.85	19.55	2	76.70
4	Erika Zuchold	East Germany	9.80	9.85	19.65	2	9.45	9.60	19.05	6	9.45	9.55	19.00	5	9.50	9.50	19.00	8	76.70
6	Karin Janz	East Germany	9.70	9.50	19.20	8	9.60	9.70	19.30	2	9.45	9.60	19.05	4	9.50	9.50	19.00	8	76.55
7	Olga Karasyova	Soviet Union	9.65	9.50	19.15	10	9.40	9.60	19.00	7	9.30	9.40	18.70	18	9.70	9.85	19.55	2	76.00
7	Bohumila Řimnáčová	Czechoslovakia	9.55	9.15	18.70	24	9.50	9.80	19.30	2	9.45	9.40	18.85	10	9.50	9.65	19.15	6	76.00
9	Marianna Krajčírová	Czechoslovakia	9.75	9.70	19.45	3	8.95	9.75	18.70	21	9.35	9.30	18.65	22	9.55	9.55	19.10	7	75.85
9	Miroslava Skleničková	Czechoslovakia	9.70	9.65	19.35	6	9.45	9.65	19.10	4	9.30	9.30	18.60	23	9.40	9.40	18.80	17	75.85
11	Hana Lišková	Czechoslovakia	9.60	9.40	19.00	13	9.35	9.55	18.90	12	9.45	9.40	18.85	10	9.40	9.50	18.90	13	75.65
12	Maritta Bauerschmidt	East Germany	9.45	9.45	18.90	17	9.30	9.50	18.80	17	9.50	9.45	18.95	8	9.40	9.40	18.80	17	75.45
13	Kazue Hanyu	Japan	9.50	9.40	18.90	17	9.30	9.70	19.00	7	9.35	9.40	18.75	16	9.35	9.30	18.65	24	75.30
14	Ágnes Bánfai	Hungary	9.30	9.40	18.70	24	9.30	9.50	18.80	17	9.50	9.35	18.85	10	9.45	9.30	18.75	20	75.10
15	Jana Kubičková	Czechoslovakia	9.60	9.40	19.00	13	8.85	9.50	18.35	28	9.30	9.40	18.70	18	9.50	9.50	19.00	8	75.05
16	Cathy Rigby	United States	9.20	9.10	18.30	36	9.40	9.50	18.90	12	9.55	9.45	19.00	5	9.45	9.30	18.75	20	74.95
17	Miyuki Matsuhisa	Japan	9.55	9.55	19.10	12	8.65	9.40	18.05	39	9.50	9.40	18.90	9	9.40	9.45	18.85	14	74.90
18	Taniko Mitsukuri	Japan	9.55	8.85	18.40	31	9.45	9.55	19.00	7	9.35	9.25	18.60	23	9.40	9.45	18.85	14	74.85
19	Anikó Ducza	Hungary	9.50	9.35	18.85	20	9.15	9.15	18.30	29	9.50	9.20	18.70	18	9.50	9.45	18.95	12	74.80
19	Chieko Oda	Japan	9.40	9.50	18.90	17	9.25	9.50	18.75	20	9.25	9.05	18.30	30	9.45	9.40	18.85	14	74.80
19	Evelyne Letourneur	France	9.40	8.95	18.35	35	9.50	9.45	18.95	10	9.50	9.25	18.75	16	9.30	9.45	18.75	20	74.80
22	Mitsuko Kandori	Japan	9.35	9.50	18.85	20	9.30	9.40	18.70	21	9.35	9.25	18.60	23	9.25	9.25	18.50	27	74.65
22	Ute Starke	East Germany	9.60	9.55	19.15	10	9.35	9.45	18.80	17	9.20	9.00	18.20	33	9.25	9.25	18.50	27	74.65
24	Ludmilla Tourischeva	Soviet Union	9.60	9.25	18.85	20	9.40	9.50	18.90	12	9.30	8.45	17.75	43	9.50	9.50	19.00	8	74.50
25	Lyubov Burda	Soviet Union	9.60	9.35	18.95	16	9.30	8.35	17.65	51	9.50	9.35	18.85	10	9.35	9.40	18.75	20	74.20
26	Katalin Makray	Hungary	9.35	9.30	18.65	27	9.45	9.45	18.90	12	9.25	9.10	18.35	29	9.10	9.15	18.25	33	74.15
27	Marianne Noack	East Germany	9.50	9.50	19.00	13	8.20	9.40	17.60	52	9.45	9.40	18.85	10	9.35	9.30	18.65	24	74.10
28	Linda Metheny	United States	9.35	9.05	18.40	31	9.40	8.75	18.15	34	9.60	9.55	19.15	3	9.30	9.00	18.30	32	74.00
29	Magdalena Schmidt	East Germany	9.65	9.65	19.30	7	9.40	9.45	18.85	16	9.10	8.20	17.30	58	9.25	9.25	18.50	27	73.95
30	Joyce Tanac	United States	9.25	9.20	18.45	30	9.20	9.20	18.40	27	9.25	9.20	18.45	27	9.25	9.10	18.35	31	73.65
31	Kathy Gleason	United States	9.20	9.30	18.50	29	9.00	9.30	18.30	29	9.15	9.30	18.45	27	9.20	9.05	18.25	33	73.30
32	Mariya Karashka	Bulgaria	9.45	9.25	18.70	24	9.35	9.30	18.65	23	8.80	9.25	18.05	37	8.80	9.10	17.90	49	73.30
33	Kayoko Hashiguchi	Japan	9.35	9.20	18.55	28	7.85	9.35	17.20	68	9.35	9.25	18.60	23	9.30	9.50	18.80	17	73.15
34	Colleen Mulvihill	United States	8.95	8.90	17.85	53	9.20	9.30	18.50	24	9.40	9.30	18.70	18	9.15	8.85	18.00	43	73.05
35	Márta Tolnai	Hungary	9.20	9.20	18.40	31	8.25	9.25	17.50	55	9.10	9.20	18.30	30	9.10	9.15	18.25	33	72.45
35	Jacqueline Brisepierre	France	9.25	8.95	18.20	39	9.15	9.30	18.45	26	9.20	8.75	17.95	39	9.00	8.85	17.85	53	72.45
37	Katalin Müller	Hungary	9.25	8.95	18.20	39	8.20	9.40	17.60	52	9.45	8.35	17.80	41	9.35	9.20	18.55	26	72.15
38	Ilona Békési	Hungary	9.25	8.85	18.10	42	8.50	8.85	17.35	61	9.20	9.05	18.25	32	9.05	9.10	18.15	38	71.85
39	Wendy Cluff	United States	9.05	8.75	17.80	58	8.75	9.00	17.75	46	9.20	9.00	18.20	33	9.10	8.95	18.05	42	71.80
40	Mireille Cayre	France	9.40	9.35	18.75	23	9.10	8.00	17.10	69	8.95	8.80	17.75	43	9.05	9.05	18.10	39	71.75
40	Łucja Ochmańska	Poland	9.35	8.70	18.05	44	8.75	9.10	17.85	44	8.80	9.00	17.80	41	8.95	9.05	18.00	43	71.75
42	Wiesława Lech	Poland	8.95	8.60	17.55	65	9.15	8.90	18.05	39	9.05	8.95	18.00	38	8.90	9.05	17.95	47	71.55
43	Angelika Kern	West Germany	9.10	8.90	18.00	46	8.90	9.15	18.05	39	8.50	9.00	17.50	52	8.75	9.05	17.80	54	71.35
44	Vanya Marinova	Bulgaria	9.10	9.15	18.25	38	8.90	9.25	18.15	34	7.35	9.30	16.65	77	9.00	9.25	18.25	33	71.30
45	Irmi Krauser	West Germany	9.30	9.00	18.30	36	9.10	9.40	18.50	24	8.50	7.90	16.40	82	8.80	9.20	18.00	43	71.20
46	Françoise Nourry	France	8.75	8.40	17.15	79	8.65	8.95	17.60	52	9.15	8.60	17.75	43	9.20	9.05	18.25	33	70.75
46	Barbara Zięba	Poland	9.05	8.85	17.90	51	9.05	8.65	17.70	47	8.45	9.10	17.55	49	8.70	8.95	17.65	64	70.75
48	Marie-Luise Stegemann	West Germany	9.40	9.00	18.40	31	9.00	8.35	17.35	61	8.65	8.05	16.70	75	8.90	9.20	18.10	39	70.55
48	Marie Lundqvist	Sweden	9.10	8.85	17.95	49	8.70	8.80	17.50	55	8.60	8.75	17.35	57	8.80	8.95	17.75	56	70.55
50	Rose-Marie Holm	Sweden	8.85	9.15	18.00	46	8.75	9.20	17.95	43	8.85	8.15	17.00	62	8.80	8.75	17.55	68	70.50
51	Neli Stoyanova	Bulgaria	8.90	8.95	17.85	53	9.00	7.70	16.70	76	8.95	9.25	18.20	33	8.80	8.90	17.70	60	70.45
51	Jennifer Diachun	Canada	9.20	8.85	18.05	44	8.70	9.00	17.70	47	8.90	8.10	17.00	62	8.65	9.05	17.70	60	70.45
51	Vesela Pasheva	Bulgaria	8.90	8.85	17.75	60	8.55	8.75	17.30	66	8.75	8.95	17.70	46	8.75	8.95	17.70	60	70.45
54	Nataša Bajin-Šljepica	Yugoslavia	9.15	8.85	18.00	46	9.20	9.00	18.20	31	8.55	7.70	16.25	83	8.85	9.05	17.90	49	70.35
55	Grażyna Witkowska	Poland	8.75	8.65	17.40	68	9.15	8.95	18.10	37	8.75	8.05	16.80	70	8.95	9.05	18.00	43	70.30
55	Petra Jebram	West Germany	9.05	8.85	17.90	51	8.85	9.30	18.15	34	8.80	7.65	16.45	80	8.70	9.10	17.80	54	70.30
57	Dominique Lauvard	France	8.85	8.45	17.30	74	9.10	8.35	17.45	58	9.05	7.95	17.00	62	9.15	9.25	18.40	30	70.15
58	Adriana Biagiotti	Italy	9.15	9.05	18.20	39	8.70	9.00	17.70	47	9.00	8.05	17.05	61	8.60	8.55	17.15	82	70.10
59	Anna Stein	West Germany	9.20	8.65	17.85	53	8.85	9.35	18.20	31	8.50	7.35	15.85	85	8.70	9.05	17.75	56	70.00
59	Solveig Egman-Andersson	Sweden	9.10	9.00	18.10	42	8.90	8.80	17.70	47	8.30	8.40	16.70	75	8.70	8.80	17.50	70	70.00
59	Tsagaandorjiin Gündegmaa	Mongolia	8.55	8.60	17.15	79	8.75	8.75	17.50	55	8.85	9.25	18.10	36	8.60	8.65	17.25	78	70.00
62	Sandra Hartley	Canada	9.10	8.65	17.75	60	7.75	8.50	16.25	81	8.95	8.90	17.85	40	8.90	9.00	17.90	49	69.75
62	Helga Matschkur	West Germany	9.15	8.50	17.65	64	8.90	9.15	18.05	39	8.75	7.70	16.45	80	8.60	9.00	17.60	66	69.75
64	Gabriella Pozzuolo	Italy	8.95	8.80	17.75	60	8.60	8.85	17.45	58	8.95	8.15	17.10	60	8.80	8.55	17.35	75	69.65
65	Rayna Atanasova	Bulgaria	9.00	8.85	17.85	53	7.95	8.90	16.85	74	8.60	8.40	17.00	62	8.90	9.00	17.90	49	69.60
66	Horta Van Hoye	Belgium	9.00	8.85	17.85	53	7.60	8.80	16.40	79	8.70	9.00	17.70	46	8.65	8.80	17.45	71	69.40
67	Halina Daniec	Poland	8.90	8.80	17.70	63	8.80	9.00	17.80	45	8.50	7.45	15.95	84	8.60	9.15	17.75	56	69.20
67	Helga Braathen	Norway	8.80	8.65	17.45	67	8.10	8.90	17.00	71	8.35	9.20	17.55	49	8.55	8.65	17.20	79	69.20
69	Nicole Bourdiau	France	8.75	8.65	17.40	68	8.95	9.25	18.20	31	8.75	6.80	15.55	89	9.00	8.95	17.95	47	69.05
70	Valerie Norris	Australia	8.85	8.95	17.80	58	8.00	8.60	16.60	78	8.05	8.70	16.75	72	8.55	8.90	17.45	71	68.60
71	Teresa McDonnell	Canada	8.85	8.55	17.40	68	8.15	7.90	16.05	83	7.95	9.05	17.00	62	8.80	8.95	17.75	56	68.20
72	Miriam Villacián	Cuba	8.40	8.45	16.85	84	8.65	8.80	17.45	58	8.00	8.50	16.50	79	8.20	8.80	17.00	87	68.10
73	Zulema Bregado	Cuba	8.00	7.60	15.60	93	8.55	8.80	17.35	61	8.70	8.30	17.00	62	8.95	9.15	18.10	39	68.05
74	Margaret Bell	Great Britain	8.10	8.20	16.30	86	8.60	8.50	17.10	69	8.55	8.95	17.50	52	8.40	8.65	17.05	86	67.95
75	Christiane Goethals	Belgium	8.50	8.40	16.90	83	8.30	7.40	15.70	89	8.45	9.10	17.55	49	8.75	8.95	17.70	60	67.85
75	Else Trangbæk	Denmark	8.25	8.95	17.20	77	7.30	8.70	16.00	84	8.25	8.75	17.00	62	8.70	8.95	17.65	64	67.85
77	Daniela Maccelli	Italy	9.05	8.90	17.95	49	8.45	8.40	16.85	74	8.70	7.10	15.80	86	8.65	8.55	17.20	79	67.80
77	Jill Kvamme	Norway	8.75	8.50	17.25	76	8.30	7.90	16.20	82	8.20	9.05	17.25	59	8.55	8.55	17.10	84	67.80
79	Marilynn Minaker	Canada	8.60	8.60	17.20	77	8.15	7.70	15.85	87	8.35	9.05	17.40	55	8.55	8.60	17.15	82	67.60
80	Torunn Isberg	Norway	8.65	8.35	17.00	82	7.90	8.10	16.00	84	7.90	9.10	17.00	62	8.65	8.90	17.55	68	67.55
81	Suzanne Cloutier	Canada	8.90	8.45	17.35	72	8.40	8.95	17.35	61	8.25	7.25	15.50	90	8.65	8.55	17.20	79	67.40
82	Małgorzata Chojnacka	Poland	8.35	8.40	16.75	85	8.50	8.85	17.35	61	8.45	7.20	15.65	88	8.65	8.95	17.60	66	67.35
83	Nancy Aldama	Cuba	8.15	8.00	16.15	89	8.40	7.60	16.00	84	8.70	8.80	17.50	52	8.35	9.05	17.40	74	67.00
84	Yadamsürengiin Tuyaa	Mongolia	6.80	7.80	14.60	95	8.45	8.80	17.25	67	8.60	9.00	17.60	48	8.60	8.85	17.45	71	66.90
85	Esbela da Fonseca	Portugal	8.95	8.40	17.35	72	8.40	8.55	16.95	72	7.55	7.90	15.45	91	8.40	8.55	16.95	88	66.70
86	Wenche Sjong	Norway	8.80	8.30	17.10	81	7.75	7.35	15.10	94	8.45	8.95	17.40	55	8.40	8.45	16.85	90	66.45
87	Unni Holmen	Norway	8.95	8.45	17.40	68	7.60	8.10	15.70	89	8.05	7.70	15.75	87	8.55	8.30	16.85	90	65.70
88	Mary Prestidge	Great Britain	9.25	8.05	17.30	74	7.95	7.30	15.25	93	8.25	8.50	16.75	72	8.55	8.75	17.30	77	65.60
89	Ann-Mari Hvaal	Norway	8.90	8.60	17.50	66	6.90	8.20	15.10	94	7.40	7.50	14.90	93	7.95	8.35	16.30	99	63.80
90	Julieta Sáenz	Mexico	7.95	8.00	15.95	90	8.25	8.45	16.70	76	7.70	6.65	14.35	95	8.40	8.25	16.65	94	63.75
91	Nereida Bauta	Cuba	8.40	7.80	16.20	87	4.75	8.00	12.75	98	8.00	8.55	16.55	78	8.45	8.90	17.35	75	62.85
91	Suzette Blanco	Cuba	7.90	8.30	16.20	87	5.80	7.10	12.90	97	8.25	8.55	16.80	70	8.20	8.75	16.95	88	62.85
93	María Luisa Morales	Mexico	7.85	7.35	15.20	94	8.40	8.55	16.95	72	7.05	6.85	13.90	96	8.25	8.40	16.65	94	62.70
94	María Elena Ramírez	Mexico	7.85	7.85	15.70	92	5.95	8.50	14.45	96	7.75	7.70	15.45	91	8.30	8.25	16.55	97	61.55
95	Yolanda Vega	Cuba	7.50	6.60	14.10	96	6.90	8.75	15.65	91	8.20	6.65	14.85	94	8.05	8.55	16.60	96	61.20
96	Rosario Briones	Mexico	7.90	7.90	15.80	91	7.25	8.40	15.65	91	6.30	6.40	12.70	100	8.40	8.30	16.70	92	60.85
97	Dorjiin Norolkhoo	Mongolia	6.70	6.80	13.50	98	4.00	7.95	11.95	100	8.40	8.35	16.75	72	8.60	8.50	17.10	84	59.50
98	Laura Rivera	Mexico	6.70	5.75	12.45	100	7.80	8.50	16.30	80	7.85	6.05	13.90	96	8.55	8.15	16.70	92	59.35
99	Rosalinda Puente	Mexico	6.70	6.65	13.35	99	7.35	8.45	15.80	88	6.90	5.90	12.80	99	8.20	8.25	16.45	98	58.40
100	Yu Mai-Lee	Chinese Taipei	6.50	7.10	13.60	97	6.15	4.25	10.40	101	7.10	6.65	13.75	98	7.75	7.70	15.45	100	53.30
101	Hong Tai-Kwai	Chinese Taipei	6.35	5.75	12.10	101	6.10	6.30	12.40	99	8.05	4.65	12.70	100	7.75	7.70	15.45	100	52.65
