= Gymnastics at the 1968 Summer Olympics – Women's vault =

Women's vault at the Games of the XIX Olympiad
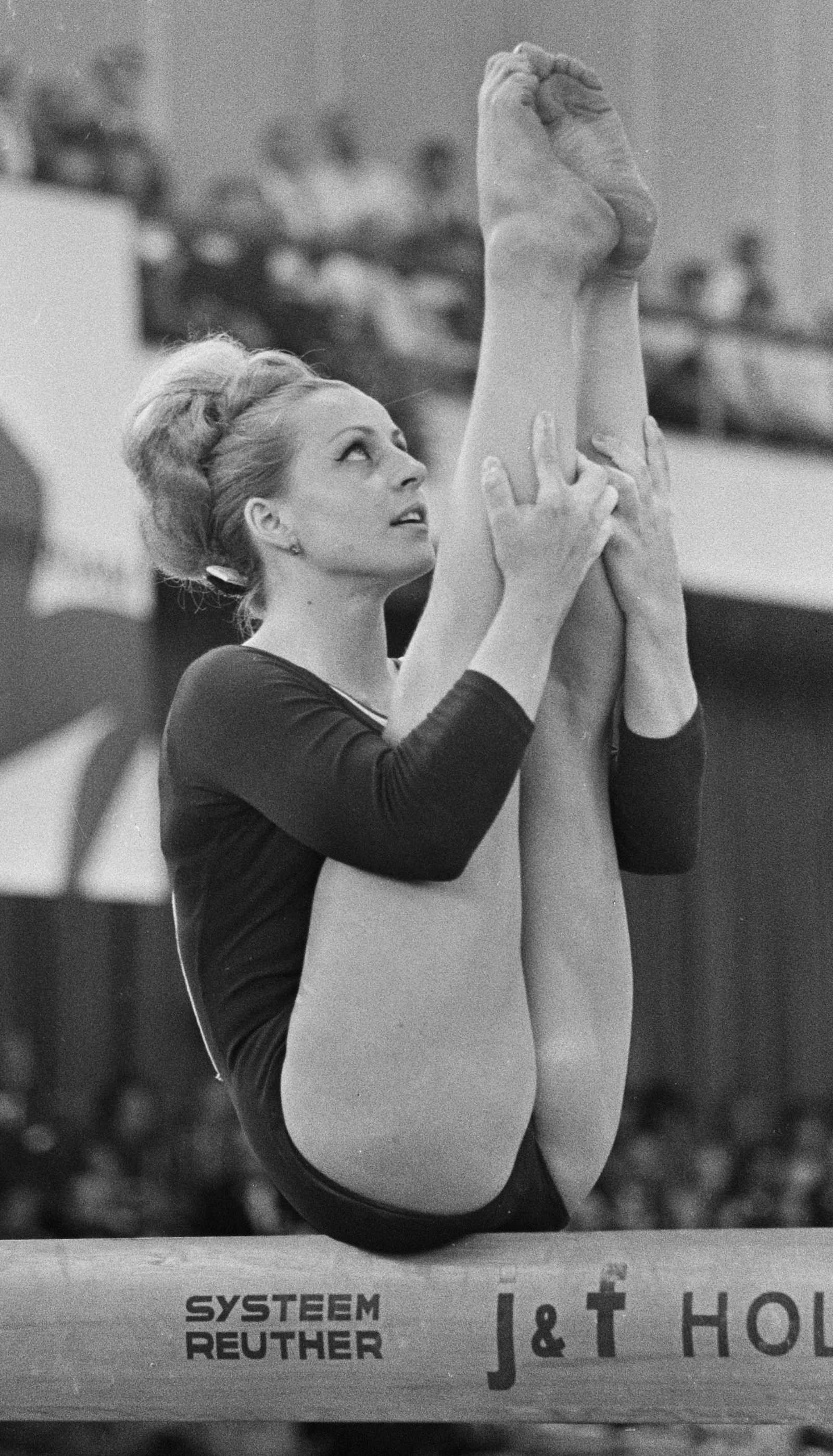
- Gold medalist Věra Čáslavská (1967)
- Venue: Auditorio Nacional
- Date: 21–25 October 1968
- Competitors: 101 from 28 nations
- Winning score: 19.775

Medalists
1st place, gold medalist(s)		Věra Čáslavská	Czechoslovakia
2nd place, silver medalist(s)		Erika Zuchold	East Germany
3rd place, bronze medalist(s)		Zinaida Voronina	Soviet Union

These are the results of the women's vault competition, one of six events for female competitors in artistic gymnastics at the 1968 Summer Olympics in Mexico City.

== Competition format ==
Each nation entered a team of six gymnasts or up to three individual gymnasts. All entrants in the gymnastics competitions performed both a compulsory exercise and a voluntary exercise for each apparatus. The scores for all 8 exercises were summed to give an individual all-around score.

These exercise scores were also used for qualification for the new apparatus finals. The two exercises (compulsory and voluntary) for each apparatus were summed to give an apparatus score; the top 6 in each apparatus participated in the finals; others were ranked 7th through 101st. In the final, each gymnast performed an additional voluntary exercise; half of the score from the preliminary carried over.

== Results ==
Rank	Gymnast	Nation	Preliminary			Final		
Rank	Gymnast	Nation	Compulsory	Voluntary	Total	1/2 Prelim.	Final	Total
1st place, gold medalist(s)	Věra Čáslavská	Czechoslovakia	9.90	9.85	19.75	9.875	9.900	19.775
2nd place, silver medalist(s)	Erika Zuchold	East Germany	9.80	9.85	19.65	9.825	9.800	19.625
3rd place, bronze medalist(s)	Zinaida Voronina	Soviet Union	9.75	9.65	19.40	9.700	9.800	19.500
4	Marianna Krajčírová	Czechoslovakia	9.75	9.70	19.45	9.725	9.750	19.475
5	Natalia Kuchinskaya	Soviet Union	9.75	9.70	19.45	9.725	9.650	19.375
6	Miroslava Skleničková	Czechoslovakia	9.70	9.65	19.35	9.675	9.650	19.325
7	Magdalena Schmidt	East Germany	9.65	9.65	19.30	did not advance		
8	Karin Janz	East Germany	9.70	9.50	19.20	did not advance		
8	Larisa Petrik	Soviet Union	9.70	9.50	19.20	did not advance		
10	Olga Karasyova	Soviet Union	9.65	9.50	19.15	did not advance		
10	Ute Starke	East Germany	9.60	9.55	19.15	did not advance		
12	Miyuki Matsuhisa	Japan	9.55	9.55	19.10	did not advance		
13	Hana Lišková	Czechoslovakia	9.60	9.40	19.00	did not advance		
13	Jana Kubičková-Posnerová	Czechoslovakia	9.60	9.40	19.00	did not advance		
13	Marianne Noack	East Germany	9.50	9.50	19.00	did not advance		
16	Lyubov Burda	Soviet Union	9.60	9.35	18.95	did not advance		
17	Chieko Oda	Japan	9.40	9.50	18.90	did not advance		
17	Kazue Hanyu	Japan	9.50	9.40	18.90	did not advance		
17	Maritta Bauerschmidt	East Germany	9.45	9.45	18.90	did not advance		
20	Anikó Ducza	Hungary	9.50	9.35	18.85	did not advance		
20	Ludmilla Tourischeva	Soviet Union	9.60	9.25	18.85	did not advance		
20	Mitsuko Kandori	Japan	9.35	9.50	18.85	did not advance		
23	Mireille Cayre	France	9.40	9.35	18.75	did not advance		
24	Ágnes Bánfai	Hungary	9.30	9.40	18.70	did not advance		
24	Bohumila Řimnáčová	Czechoslovakia	9.55	9.15	18.70	did not advance		
24	Mariya Karashka	Bulgaria	9.45	9.25	18.70	did not advance		
27	Katalin Makray	Hungary	9.35	9.30	18.65	did not advance		
28	Kayoko Hashiguchi	Japan	9.35	9.20	18.55	did not advance		
29	Kathy Gleason	United States	9.20	9.30	18.50	did not advance		
30	Joyce Tanac	United States	9.25	9.20	18.45	did not advance		
31	Linda Metheny	United States	9.35	9.05	18.40	did not advance		
31	Marie-Luise Stegemann	West Germany	9.40	9.00	18.40	did not advance		
31	Márta Tolnai	Hungary	9.20	9.20	18.40	did not advance		
31	Taniko Mitsukuri	Japan	9.55	8.85	18.40	did not advance		
35	Evelyne Letourneur	France	9.40	8.95	18.35	did not advance		
36	Cathy Rigby	United States	9.20	9.10	18.30	did not advance		
36	Irmi Krauser	West Germany	9.30	9.00	18.30	did not advance		
38	Vanya Marinova	Bulgaria	9.10	9.15	18.25	did not advance		
39	Adriana Biagiotti	Italy	9.15	9.05	18.20	did not advance		
39	Jacqueline Brisepierre	France	9.25	8.95	18.20	did not advance		
39	Katalin Müller	Hungary	9.25	8.95	18.20	did not advance		
42	Ilona Békési	Hungary	9.25	8.85	18.10	did not advance		
42	Solveig Egman-Andersson	Sweden	9.10	9.00	18.10	did not advance		
44	Jennifer Diachun	Canada	9.20	8.85	18.05	did not advance		
44	Łucja Ochmańska	Poland	9.35	8.70	18.05	did not advance		
46	Angelika Kern	West Germany	9.10	8.90	18.00	did not advance		
46	Natalija Sljepica	Yugoslavia	9.15	8.85	18.00	did not advance		
46	Rose-Marie Holm	Sweden	8.85	9.15	18.00	did not advance		
49	Daniela Maccelli	Italy	9.05	8.90	17.95	did not advance		
49	Marie Lundqvist	Sweden	9.10	8.85	17.95	did not advance		
51	Barbara Zięba	Poland	9.05	8.85	17.90	did not advance		
51	Petra Jebram	West Germany	9.05	8.85	17.90	did not advance		
53	Anna Stein	West Germany	9.20	8.65	17.85	did not advance		
53	Colleen Mulvihill	United States	8.95	8.90	17.85	did not advance		
53	Horta Van Hoye	Belgium	9.00	8.85	17.85	did not advance		
53	Neli Stoyanova	Bulgaria	8.90	8.95	17.85	did not advance		
53	Rayna Atanasova	Bulgaria	9.00	8.85	17.85	did not advance		
58	Valerie Norris	Australia	8.85	8.95	17.80	did not advance		
58	Wendy Cluff	United States	9.05	8.75	17.80	did not advance		
60	Gabriella Pozzuolo	Italy	8.95	8.80	17.75	did not advance		
60	Sandra Hartley	Canada	9.10	8.65	17.75	did not advance		
60	Vesela Pasheva	Bulgaria	8.90	8.85	17.75	did not advance		
63	Halina Daniec	Poland	8.90	8.80	17.70	did not advance		
64	Helga Matschkur	West Germany	9.15	8.50	17.65	did not advance		
65	Wiesława Lech	Poland	8.95	8.60	17.55	did not advance		
66	Ann-Mari Hvaal	Norway	8.90	8.60	17.50	did not advance		
67	Helga Braathen	Norway	8.80	8.65	17.45	did not advance		
68	Grażyna Witkowska	Poland	8.75	8.65	17.40	did not advance		
68	Nicole Bourdiau	France	8.75	8.65	17.40	did not advance		
68	Theresa McDonnell	Canada	8.85	8.55	17.40	did not advance		
68	Unni Holmen	Norway	8.95	8.45	17.40	did not advance		
72	Esbela da Fonseca	Portugal	8.95	8.40	17.35	did not advance		
72	Suzanne Cloutier	Canada	8.90	8.45	17.35	did not advance		
74	Dominique Lauvard	France	8.85	8.45	17.30	did not advance		
74	Mary Prestidge	Great Britain	9.25	8.05	17.30	did not advance		
76	Jill Kvamme	Norway	8.75	8.50	17.25	did not advance		
77	Else Trangbaek	Denmark	8.25	8.95	17.20	did not advance		
77	Marilynn Minaker	Canada	8.60	8.60	17.20	did not advance		
79	Françoise Nourry	France	8.75	8.40	17.15	did not advance		
79	Gondegmaa Tsagaandorj	Mongolia	8.55	8.60	17.15	did not advance		
81	Wenche Sjong	Norway	8.80	8.30	17.10	did not advance		
82	Torunn Isberg	Norway	8.65	8.35	17.00	did not advance		
83	Christiane Goethals	Belgium	8.50	8.40	16.90	did not advance		
84	Miriam Villacian	Cuba	8.40	8.45	16.85	did not advance		
85	Małgorzata Chojnacka	Poland	8.35	8.40	16.75	did not advance		
86	Margaret Bell	Great Britain	8.10	8.20	16.30	did not advance		
87	Nereida Bauta	Cuba	8.40	7.80	16.20	did not advance		
87	Suzette Blanco	Cuba	7.90	8.30	16.20	did not advance		
89	Nancy Aldama	Cuba	8.15	8.00	16.15	did not advance		
90	Julietta Saenz de Secilia	Mexico	7.95	8.00	15.95	did not advance		
91	Rosario Briones	Mexico	7.90	7.90	15.80	did not advance		
92	Elena Ramirez	Mexico	7.85	7.85	15.70	did not advance		
93	Zulema Bregado	Cuba	8.00	7.60	15.60	did not advance		
94	Luisa Morales	Mexico	7.85	7.35	15.20	did not advance		
95	Tuiaa Iadamsurenglin	Mongolia	6.80	7.80	14.60	did not advance		
96	Yolanda Vega	Cuba	7.50	6.60	14.10	did not advance		
97	Yu Mai-Lee	Chinese Taipei	6.50	7.10	13.60	did not advance		
98	Norikhoo Dorj	Mongolia	6.70	6.80	13.50	did not advance		
99	Rosalinda Puente	Mexico	6.70	6.65	13.35	did not advance		
100	Laura Rivera	Mexico	6.70	5.75	12.45	did not advance		
101	Hong Tai-kwai	Chinese Taipei	6.35	5.75	12.10	did not advance		
