= Gymnastics at the 1968 Summer Olympics – Women's balance beam =

Women's balance beam at the Games of the XIX Olympiad
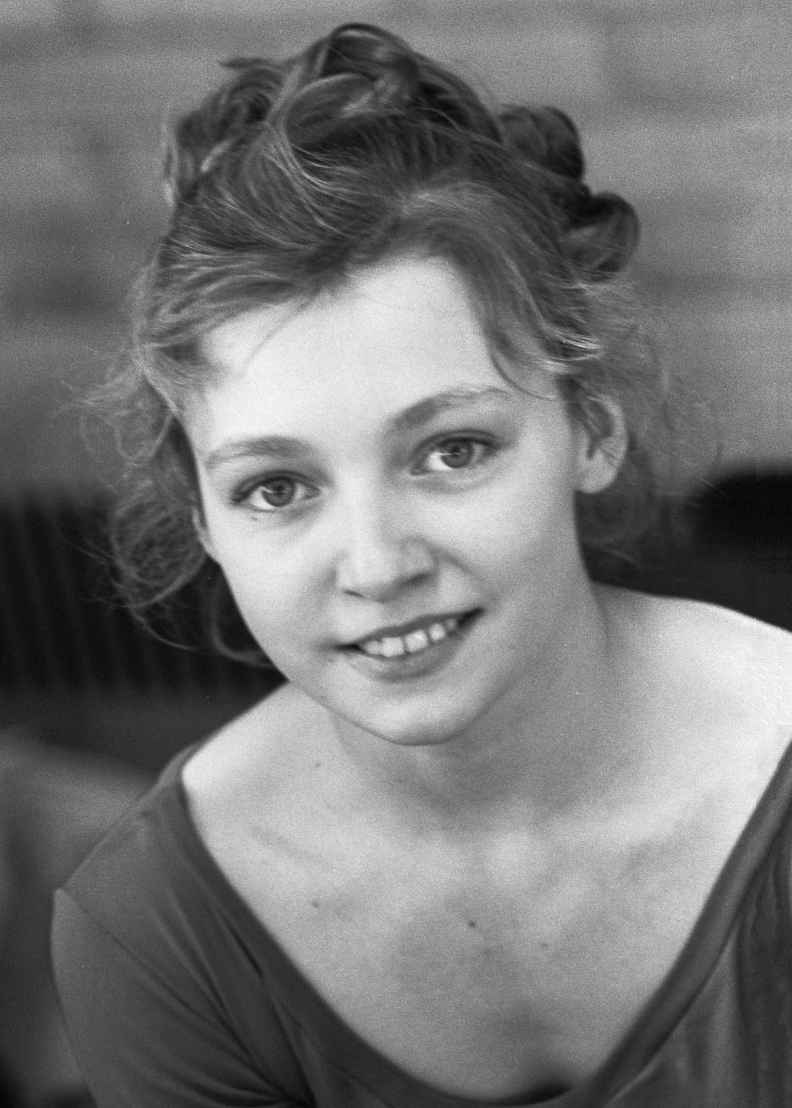
- Gold medalist Natalia Kuchinskaya (1967)
- Venue: Auditorio Nacional
- Date: 21–25 October 1968
- Competitors: 101 from 28 nations
- Winning score: 19.650

Medalists
1st place, gold medalist(s)		Natalia Kuchinskaya	Soviet Union
2nd place, silver medalist(s)		Věra Čáslavská	Czechoslovakia
3rd place, bronze medalist(s)		Larisa Petrik	Soviet Union

These are the results of the women's balance beam competition, one of six events for female competitors in artistic gymnastics at the 1968 Summer Olympics in Mexico City.

Kuchinskaya was controversially awarded gold over Čáslavská after initial scores were revised. A similar controversy occurred in the floor event, and both were in favor of Soviet athletes.

== Competition format ==
Each nation entered a team of six gymnasts or up to three individual gymnasts. All entrants in the gymnastics competitions performed both a compulsory exercise and a voluntary exercise for each apparatus. The scores for all 8 exercises were summed to give an individual all-around score.

These exercise scores were also used for qualification for the new apparatus finals. The two exercises (compulsory and voluntary) for each apparatus were summed to give an apparatus score; the top 6 in each apparatus participated in the finals; others were ranked 7th through 101st. In the final, each gymnast performed an additional voluntary exercise; half of the score from the preliminary carried over.

== Results ==
Rank	Gymnast	Nation	Preliminary			Final		
Rank	Gymnast	Nation	Compulsory	Voluntary	Total	1/2 Prelim.	Final	Total
1st place, gold medalist(s)	Natalia Kuchinskaya	Soviet Union	9.80	9.80	19.60	9.800	9.850	19.650
2nd place, silver medalist(s)	Věra Čáslavská	Czechoslovakia	9.65	9.80	19.45	9.725	9.850	19.575
3rd place, bronze medalist(s)	Larisa Petrik	Soviet Union	9.50	9.50	19.00	9.500	9.750	19.250
4	Linda Metheny	United States	9.60	9.55	19.15	9.575	9.650	19.225
4	Karin Janz	East Germany	9.45	9.60	19.05	9.525	9.700	19.225
6	Erika Zuchold	East Germany	9.45	9.55	19.00	9.500	9.650	19.150
7	Cathy Rigby	United States	9.55	9.45	19.00	did not advance		
8	Maritta Bauerschmidt	East Germany	9.50	9.45	18.95	did not advance		
9	Miyuki Matsuhisa	Japan	9.50	9.40	18.90	did not advance		
10	Ágnes Bánfai	Hungary	9.50	9.35	18.85	did not advance		
10	Lyubov Burda	Soviet Union	9.50	9.35	18.85	did not advance		
10	Hana Lišková	Czechoslovakia	9.45	9.40	18.85	did not advance		
10	Marianne Noack	East Germany	9.45	9.40	18.85	did not advance		
10	Bohumila Řimnáčová	Czechoslovakia	9.45	9.40	18.85	did not advance		
15	Zinaida Voronina	Soviet Union	9.40	9.40	18.80	did not advance		
16	Kazue Hanyu	Japan	9.35	9.40	18.75	did not advance		
16	Evelyne Letourneur	France	9.50	9.25	18.75	did not advance		
18	Anikó Ducza	Hungary	9.50	9.20	18.70	did not advance		
18	Olga Karasyova	Soviet Union	9.30	9.40	18.70	did not advance		
18	Jana Kubičková-Posnerová	Czechoslovakia	9.30	9.40	18.70	did not advance		
18	Colleen Mulvihill	United States	9.40	9.30	18.70	did not advance		
22	Marianna Krajčírová	Czechoslovakia	9.35	9.30	18.65	did not advance		
23	Kayoko Hashiguchi	Japan	9.35	9.25	18.60	did not advance		
23	Mitsuko Kandori	Japan	9.35	9.25	18.60	did not advance		
23	Taniko Mitsukuri	Japan	9.35	9.25	18.60	did not advance		
23	Miroslava Skleničková	Czechoslovakia	9.30	9.30	18.60	did not advance		
27	Kathy Gleason	United States	9.15	9.30	18.45	did not advance		
27	Joyce Tanac	United States	9.25	9.20	18.45	did not advance		
29	Katalin Makray	Hungary	9.25	9.10	18.35	did not advance		
30	Chieko Oda	Japan	9.25	9.05	18.30	did not advance		
30	Márta Tolnai	Hungary	9.10	9.20	18.30	did not advance		
32	Ilona Békési	Hungary	9.20	9.05	18.25	did not advance		
33	Wendy Cluff	United States	9.20	9.00	18.20	did not advance		
33	Ute Starke	East Germany	9.20	9.00	18.20	did not advance		
33	Neli Stoyanova	Bulgaria	8.95	9.25	18.20	did not advance		
36	Gondegmaa Tsagaandorj	Mongolia	8.85	9.25	18.10	did not advance		
37	Mariya Karashka	Bulgaria	8.80	9.25	18.05	did not advance		
38	Wiesława Lech	Poland	9.05	8.95	18.00	did not advance		
39	Jacqueline Brisepierre	France	9.20	8.75	17.95	did not advance		
40	Sandra Hartley	Canada	8.95	8.90	17.85	did not advance		
41	Katalin Müller	Hungary	9.45	8.35	17.80	did not advance		
41	Łucja Ochmańska	Poland	8.80	9.00	17.80	did not advance		
43	Mireille Cayre	France	8.95	8.80	17.75	did not advance		
43	Françoise Nourry	France	9.15	8.60	17.75	did not advance		
43	Ludmilla Tourischeva	Soviet Union	9.30	8.45	17.75	did not advance		
46	Horta Van Hoye	Belgium	8.70	9.00	17.70	did not advance		
46	Vesela Pasheva	Bulgaria	8.75	8.95	17.70	did not advance		
48	Tuiaa Iadamsurenglin	Mongolia	8.60	9.00	17.60	did not advance		
49	Helga Braathen	Norway	8.35	9.20	17.55	did not advance		
49	Christiane Goethals	Belgium	8.45	9.10	17.55	did not advance		
49	Barbara Zięba	Poland	8.45	9.10	17.55	did not advance		
52	Nancy Aldama	Cuba	8.70	8.80	17.50	did not advance		
52	Margaret Bell	Great Britain	8.55	8.95	17.50	did not advance		
52	Angelika Kern	West Germany	8.50	9.00	17.50	did not advance		
55	Marilynn Minaker	Canada	8.35	9.05	17.40	did not advance		
55	Wenche Sjong	Norway	8.45	8.95	17.40	did not advance		
57	Marie Lundqvist	Sweden	8.60	8.75	17.35	did not advance		
58	Magdalena Schmidt	East Germany	9.10	8.20	17.30	did not advance		
59	Jill Kvamme	Norway	8.20	9.05	17.25	did not advance		
60	Gabriella Pozzuolo	Italy	8.95	8.15	17.10	did not advance		
61	Adriana Biagiotti	Italy	9.00	8.05	17.05	did not advance		
62	Rayna Atanasova	Bulgaria	8.60	8.40	17.00	did not advance		
62	Zulema Bregado	Cuba	8.70	8.30	17.00	did not advance		
62	Jennifer Diachun	Canada	8.90	8.10	17.00	did not advance		
62	Rose-Marie Holm	Sweden	8.85	8.15	17.00	did not advance		
62	Torunn Isberg	Norway	7.90	9.10	17.00	did not advance		
62	Dominique Lauvard	France	9.05	7.95	17.00	did not advance		
62	Theresa McDonnell	Canada	7.95	9.05	17.00	did not advance		
62	Else Trangbaek	Denmark	8.25	8.75	17.00	did not advance		
70	Suzette Blanco	Cuba	8.25	8.55	16.80	did not advance		
70	Grażyna Witkowska	Poland	8.75	8.05	16.80	did not advance		
72	Norikhoo Dorj	Mongolia	8.40	8.35	16.75	did not advance		
72	Valerie Norris	Australia	8.05	8.70	16.75	did not advance		
72	Mary Prestidge	Great Britain	8.25	8.50	16.75	did not advance		
75	Solveig Egman-Andersson	Sweden	8.30	8.40	16.70	did not advance		
75	Marie-Luise Stegemann	West Germany	8.65	8.05	16.70	did not advance		
77	Vanya Marinova	Bulgaria	7.35	9.30	16.65	did not advance		
78	Nereida Bauta	Cuba	8.00	8.55	16.55	did not advance		
79	Miriam Villacian	Cuba	8.00	8.50	16.50	did not advance		
80	Petra Jebram	West Germany	8.80	7.65	16.45	did not advance		
80	Helga Matschkur	West Germany	8.75	7.70	16.45	did not advance		
82	Irmi Krauser	West Germany	8.50	7.90	16.40	did not advance		
83	Natalija Sljepica	Yugoslavia	8.55	7.70	16.25	did not advance		
84	Halina Daniec	Poland	8.50	7.45	15.95	did not advance		
85	Anna Stein	West Germany	8.50	7.35	15.85	did not advance		
86	Daniela Maccelli	Italy	8.70	7.10	15.80	did not advance		
87	Unni Holmen	Norway	8.05	7.70	15.75	did not advance		
88	Małgorzata Chojnacka	Poland	8.45	7.20	15.65	did not advance		
89	Nicole Bourdiau	France	8.75	6.80	15.55	did not advance		
90	Suzanne Cloutier	Canada	8.25	7.25	15.50	did not advance		
91	Esbela da Fonseca	Portugal	7.55	7.90	15.45	did not advance		
91	Elena Ramirez	Mexico	7.75	7.70	15.45	did not advance		
93	Ann-Mari Hvaal	Norway	7.40	7.50	14.90	did not advance		
94	Yolanda Vega	Cuba	8.20	6.65	14.85	did not advance		
95	Julietta Saenz de Secilia	Mexico	7.70	6.65	14.35	did not advance		
96	Luisa Morales	Mexico	7.05	6.85	13.90	did not advance		
96	Laura Rivera	Mexico	7.85	6.05	13.90	did not advance		
98	Yu Mai-Lee	Chinese Taipei	7.10	6.65	13.75	did not advance		
99	Rosalinda Puente	Mexico	6.90	5.90	12.80	did not advance		
100	Rosario Briones	Mexico	6.30	6.40	12.70	did not advance		
100	Hong Tai-kwai	Chinese Taipei	8.05	4.65	12.70	did not advance		
