= Gymnastics at the 1968 Summer Olympics – Women's floor =

Women's floor at the Games of the XIX Olympiad
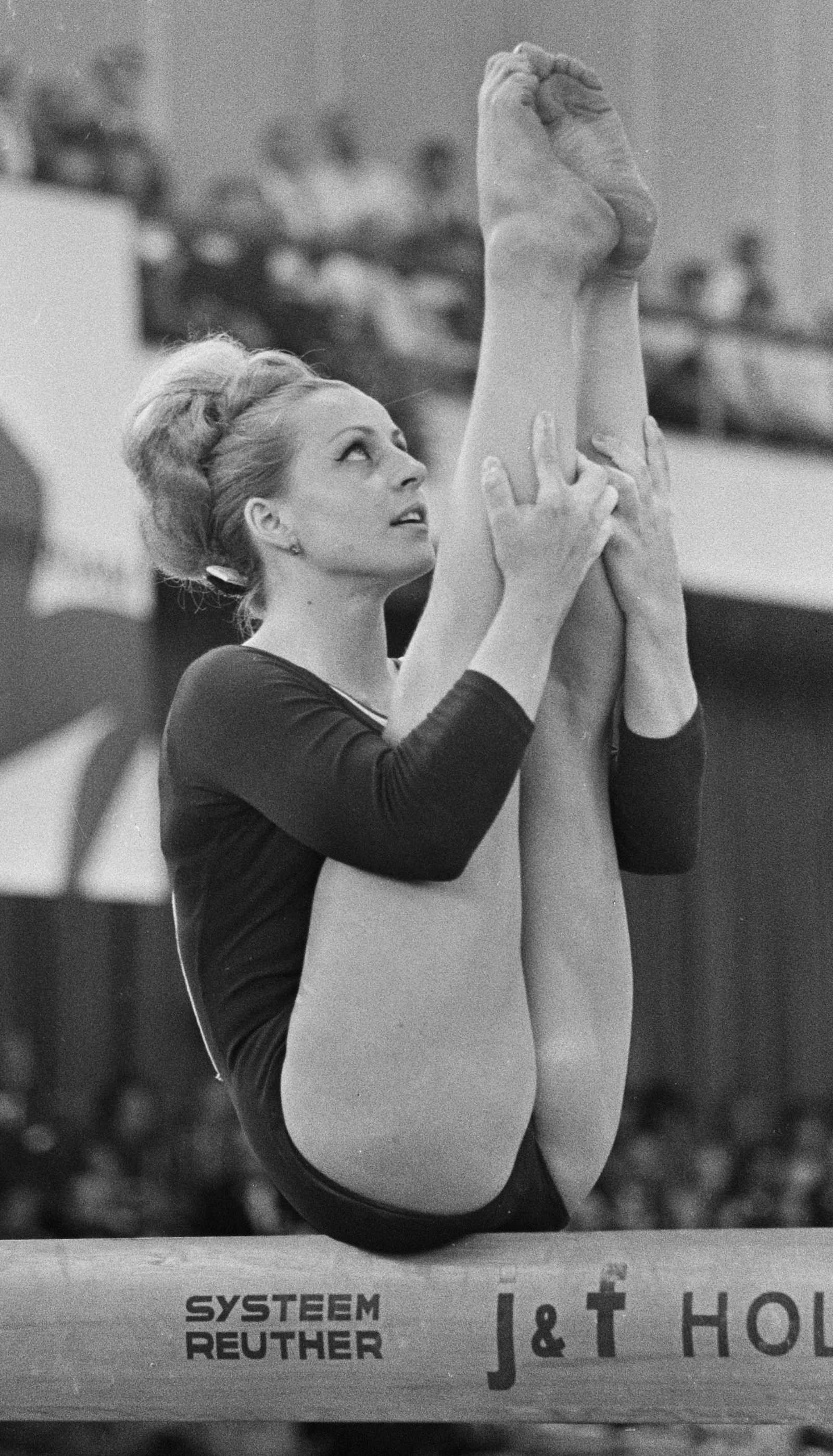
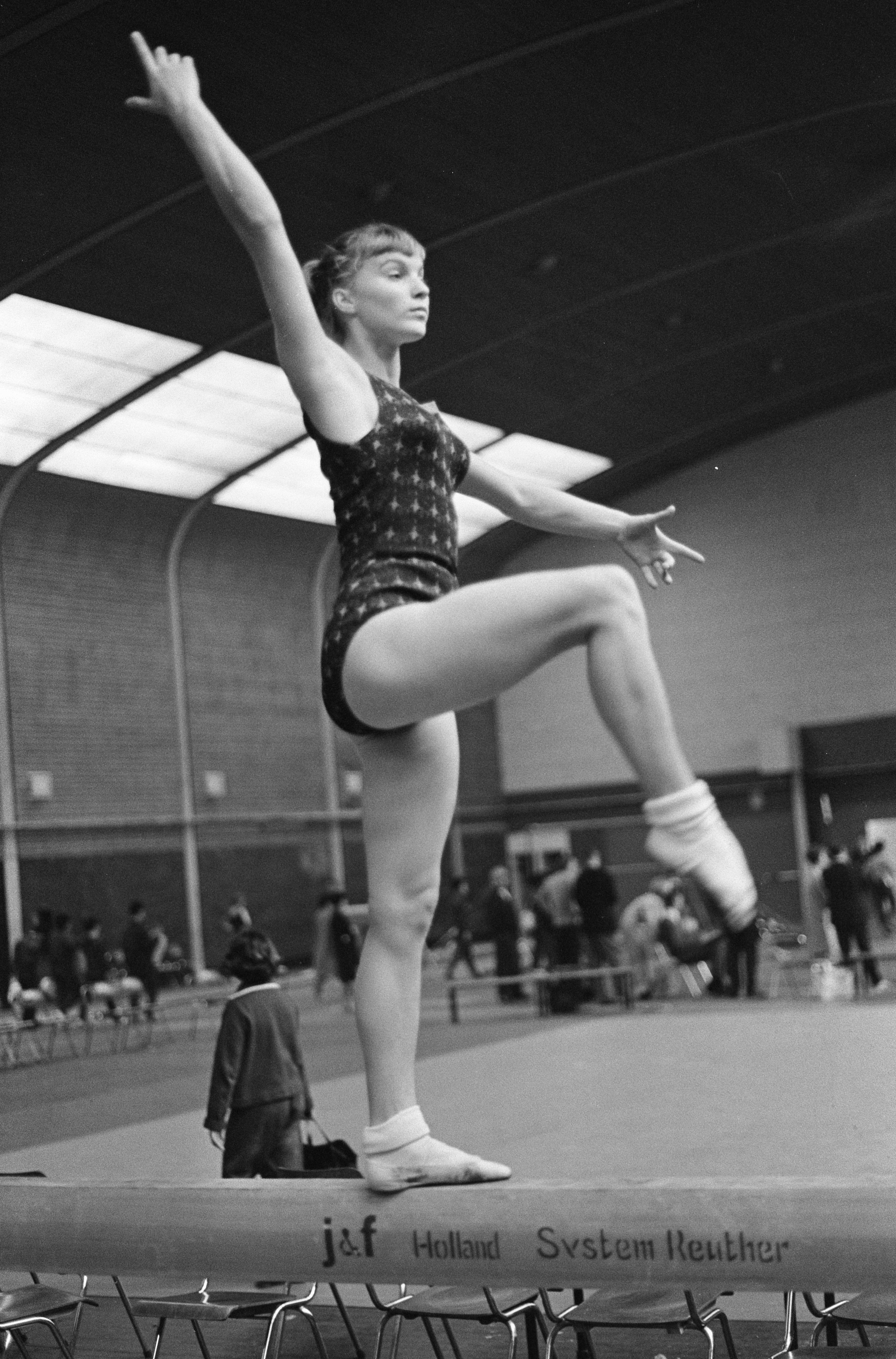
- Věra Čáslavská (1967) Larisa Petrik (1966)
- Venue: Auditorio Nacional
- Date: 21–25 October 1968
- Competitors: 101 from 28 nations
- Winning score: 19.675

Medalists
1st place, gold medalist(s)		Věra Čáslavská	Czechoslovakia
1st place, gold medalist(s)		Larisa Petrik	Soviet Union
2nd place, silver medalist(s)		not awarded	
3rd place, bronze medalist(s)		Natalia Kuchinskaya	Soviet Union

These are the results of the women's floor competition, one of six events for female competitors in artistic gymnastics at the 1968 Summer Olympics in Mexico City.

Larisa Petrik's gold medal on floor was very controversial because originally, Čáslavská won outright. After the competition was concluded, Petrik's prelims scores were changed to let her tie with Čáslavská, an action which caused Čáslavská to publicly defy the Soviets who had recently invaded her home country. A similar controversy occurred in the balance beam, where Čáslavská was denied gold altogether.

== Competition format ==
Each nation entered a team of six gymnasts or up to three individual gymnasts. All entrants in the gymnastics competitions performed both a compulsory exercise and a voluntary exercise for each apparatus. The scores for all 8 exercises were summed to give an individual all-around score.

These exercise scores were also used for qualification for the new apparatus finals. The two exercises (compulsory and voluntary) for each apparatus were summed to give an apparatus score; the top 6 in each apparatus participated in the finals; others were ranked 7th through 101st. In the final, each gymnast performed an additional voluntary exercise; half of the score from the preliminary carried over.

== Results ==
Rank	Gymnast	Nation	Preliminary			Final		
Rank	Gymnast	Nation	Compulsory	Voluntary	Total	1/2 Prelim.	Final	Total
1st place, gold medalist(s)	Věra Čáslavská	Czechoslovakia	9.70	9.85	19.55	9.775	9.900	19.675
1st place, gold medalist(s)	Larisa Petrik	Soviet Union	9.70	9.85	19.55	9.775	9.900	19.675
3rd place, bronze medalist(s)	Natalia Kuchinskaya	Soviet Union	9.75	9.85	19.60	9.800	9.850	19.650
4	Zinaida Voronina	Soviet Union	9.65	9.75	19.40	9.700	9.850	19.550
5	Olga Karasyova	Soviet Union	9.70	9.85	19.55	9.575	9.750	19.325
5	Bohumila Řimnáčová	Czechoslovakia	9.50	9.65	19.15	9.575	9.750	19.325
7	Marianna Krajčírová	Czechoslovakia	9.55	9.55	19.10	did not advance		
8	Karin Janz	East Germany	9.50	9.50	19.00	did not advance		
8	Jana Kubičková-Posnerová	Czechoslovakia	9.50	9.50	19.00	did not advance		
8	Ludmilla Tourischeva	Soviet Union	9.50	9.50	19.00	did not advance		
8	Erika Zuchold	East Germany	9.50	9.50	19.00	did not advance		
12	Anikó Ducza	Hungary	9.50	9.45	18.95	did not advance		
13	Hana Lišková	Czechoslovakia	9.40	9.50	18.90	did not advance		
14	Miyuki Matsuhisa	Japan	9.40	9.45	18.85	did not advance		
14	Taniko Mitsukuri	Japan	9.40	9.45	18.85	did not advance		
14	Chieko Oda	Japan	9.45	9.40	18.85	did not advance		
17	Maritta Bauerschmidt	East Germany	9.40	9.40	18.80	did not advance		
17	Kayoko Hashiguchi	Japan	9.30	9.50	18.80	did not advance		
17	Miroslava Skleničková	Czechoslovakia	9.40	9.40	18.80	did not advance		
20	Ágnes Bánfai	Hungary	9.45	9.30	18.75	did not advance		
20	Lyubov Burda	Soviet Union	9.35	9.40	18.75	did not advance		
20	Evelyne Letourneur	France	9.30	9.45	18.75	did not advance		
20	Cathy Rigby	United States	9.45	9.30	18.75	did not advance		
24	Kazue Hanyu	Japan	9.35	9.30	18.65	did not advance		
24	Marianne Noack	East Germany	9.35	9.30	18.65	did not advance		
26	Katalin Müller	Hungary	9.35	9.20	18.55	did not advance		
27	Mitsuko Kandori	Japan	9.25	9.25	18.50	did not advance		
27	Magdalena Schmidt	East Germany	9.25	9.25	18.50	did not advance		
27	Ute Starke	East Germany	9.25	9.25	18.50	did not advance		
30	Dominique Lauvard	France	9.15	9.25	18.40	did not advance		
31	Joyce Tanac	United States	9.25	9.10	18.35	did not advance		
32	Linda Metheny	United States	9.30	9.00	18.30	did not advance		
33	Kathy Gleason	United States	9.20	9.05	18.25	did not advance		
33	Katalin Makray	Hungary	9.10	9.15	18.25	did not advance		
33	Vanya Marinova	Bulgaria	9.00	9.25	18.25	did not advance		
33	Françoise Nourry	France	9.20	9.05	18.25	did not advance		
33	Márta Tolnai	Hungary	9.10	9.15	18.25	did not advance		
38	Ilona Békési	Hungary	9.05	9.10	18.15	did not advance		
39	Zulema Bregado	Cuba	8.95	9.15	18.10	did not advance		
39	Mireille Cayre	France	9.05	9.05	18.10	did not advance		
39	Marie-Luise Stegemann	West Germany	8.90	9.20	18.10	did not advance		
42	Wendy Cluff	United States	9.10	8.95	18.05	did not advance		
43	Irmi Krauser	West Germany	8.80	9.20	18.00	did not advance		
43	Colleen Mulvihill	United States	9.15	8.85	18.00	did not advance		
43	Łucja Ochmańska	Poland	8.95	9.05	18.00	did not advance		
43	Grażyna Witkowska	Poland	8.95	9.05	18.00	did not advance		
47	Nicole Bourdiau	France	9.00	8.95	17.95	did not advance		
47	Wiesława Lech	Poland	8.90	9.05	17.95	did not advance		
49	Rayna Atanasova	Bulgaria	8.90	9.00	17.90	did not advance		
49	Sandra Hartley	Canada	8.90	9.00	17.90	did not advance		
49	Mariya Karashka	Bulgaria	8.80	9.10	17.90	did not advance		
49	Natalija Sljepica	Yugoslavia	8.85	9.05	17.90	did not advance		
53	Jacqueline Brisepierre	France	9.00	8.85	17.85	did not advance		
54	Petra Jebram	West Germany	8.70	9.10	17.80	did not advance		
54	Angelika Kern	West Germany	8.75	9.05	17.80	did not advance		
56	Halina Daniec	Poland	8.60	9.15	17.75	did not advance		
56	Marie Lundqvist	Sweden	8.80	8.95	17.75	did not advance		
56	Theresa McDonnell	Canada	8.80	8.95	17.75	did not advance		
56	Anna Stein	West Germany	8.70	9.05	17.75	did not advance		
60	Jennifer Diachun	Canada	8.65	9.05	17.70	did not advance		
60	Christiane Goethals	Belgium	8.75	8.95	17.70	did not advance		
60	Vesela Pasheva	Bulgaria	8.75	8.95	17.70	did not advance		
60	Neli Stoyanova	Bulgaria	8.80	8.90	17.70	did not advance		
64	Else Trangbaek	Denmark	8.70	8.95	17.65	did not advance		
64	Barbara Zięba	Poland	8.70	8.95	17.65	did not advance		
66	Małgorzata Chojnacka	Poland	8.65	8.95	17.60	did not advance		
66	Helga Matschkur	West Germany	8.60	9.00	17.60	did not advance		
68	Rose-Marie Holm	Sweden	8.80	8.75	17.55	did not advance		
68	Torunn Isberg	Norway	8.65	8.90	17.55	did not advance		
70	Solveig Egman-Andersson	Sweden	8.70	8.80	17.50	did not advance		
71	Horta Van Hoye	Belgium	8.65	8.80	17.45	did not advance		
71	Tuiaa Iadamsurenglin	Mongolia	8.60	8.85	17.45	did not advance		
71	Valerie Norris	Australia	8.55	8.90	17.45	did not advance		
74	Nancy Aldama	Cuba	8.35	9.05	17.40	did not advance		
75	Nereida Bauta	Cuba	8.45	8.90	17.35	did not advance		
75	Gabriella Pozzuolo	Italy	8.80	8.55	17.35	did not advance		
77	Mary Prestidge	Great Britain	8.55	8.75	17.30	did not advance		
78	Gondegmaa Tsagaandorj	Mongolia	8.60	8.65	17.25	did not advance		
79	Helga Braathen	Norway	8.55	8.65	17.20	did not advance		
79	Suzanne Cloutier	Canada	8.65	8.55	17.20	did not advance		
79	Daniela Maccelli	Italy	8.65	8.55	17.20	did not advance		
82	Adriana Biagiotti	Italy	8.60	8.55	17.15	did not advance		
82	Marilynn Minaker	Canada	8.55	8.60	17.15	did not advance		
84	Norikhoo Dorj	Mongolia	8.60	8.50	17.10	did not advance		
84	Jill Kvamme	Norway	8.55	8.55	17.10	did not advance		
86	Margaret Bell	Great Britain	8.40	8.65	17.05	did not advance		
87	Miriam Villacian	Cuba	8.20	8.80	17.00	did not advance		
88	Suzette Blanco	Cuba	8.20	8.75	16.95	did not advance		
88	Esbela da Fonseca	Portugal	8.40	8.55	16.95	did not advance		
90	Unni Holmen	Norway	8.55	8.30	16.85	did not advance		
90	Wenche Sjong	Norway	8.40	8.45	16.85	did not advance		
92	Rosario Briones	Mexico	8.40	8.30	16.70	did not advance		
92	Laura Rivera	Mexico	8.55	8.15	16.70	did not advance		
94	Luisa Morales	Mexico	8.25	8.40	16.65	did not advance		
94	Julietta Saenz de Secilia	Mexico	8.40	8.25	16.65	did not advance		
96	Yolanda Vega	Cuba	8.05	8.55	16.60	did not advance		
97	Elena Ramirez	Mexico	8.30	8.25	16.55	did not advance		
98	Rosalinda Puente	Mexico	8.20	8.25	16.45	did not advance		
99	Ann-Mari Hvaal	Norway	7.95	8.35	16.30	did not advance		
100	Yu Mai-Lee	Chinese Taipei	7.75	7.70	15.45	did not advance		
100	Hong Tai-kwai	Chinese Taipei	7.75	7.70	15.45	did not advance		
