= Małgorzata Chojnacka =

Małgorzata Chojnacka may refer to:

- Małgorzata Chojnacka (canoeist)
- Małgorzata Chojnacka (gymnast)
