= Helmut Tepasse =

German gymnast

- Full name: Franz Helmut Tepasse
- Born: 24 November 1946 Essen, Allied-occupied Germany
- Died: 28 February 2002 (aged 55) Gangelt, Germany
- Height: 1.76 m (5 ft 9 in)

Gymnastics career
- Discipline: Men's artistic gymnastics
- Country represented: West Germany

Franz Helmut Tepasse (24 November 1946 – 28 February 2002) was a German gymnast. He competed in eight events at the 1968 Summer Olympics.
