= Damir Anić =

Croatian gymnast (1944–1992)

- Дамир Анић
- Born: 24 July 1944 Zagreb, Independent State of Croatia
- Died: 12 December 1992 (aged 48) Zagreb, Croatia

Gymnastics career
- Discipline: Men's artistic gymnastics
- Country represented: (Socialist Federal Republic of Yugoslavia) Yugoslavia

Damir Anić (24 July 1944 – 12 December 1992) was a Croatian gymnast. He competed in eight events at the 1968 Summer Olympics.
