= Reino Heino =

Finnish gymnast

- Full name: Reino Mikael Heino
- Born: 28 June 1941 Tampere, Finland
- Died: 19 May 2025 (aged 83)

Gymnastics career
- Discipline: Men's artistic gymnastics
- Country represented: Finland

Reino Mikael Heino (28 June 1941 – 19 May 2025) was a Finnish gymnast. He competed in eight events at the 1968 Summer Olympics.
