= Enrique García (gymnast) =

Mexican gymnast (born 1943)

- Full name: Enrique L. García Bustillos
- Born: 15 July 1943 (age 83) Chihuahua City, Chihuahua, Mexico
- Height: 1.65 m (5 ft 5 in)

Gymnastics career
- Discipline: Men's artistic gymnastics
- Country represented: Mexico

Enrique L. García Bustillos (born 15 July 1943) is a Mexican gymnast. He competed in eight events at the 1968 Summer Olympics.
