= Sándor Kiss (gymnast) =

Hungarian gymnast

- Born: 23 April 1941 Tura, Kingdom of Hungary
- Died: 10 November 2012 (aged 71) Budapest, Hungary
- Height: 1.66 m (5 ft 5 in)

Gymnastics career
- Discipline: Men's artistic gymnastics
- Country represented: Hungary
- Club: Ferencvárosi Torna Club

Sándor Kiss (23 April 1941 – 10 November 2012) was a Hungarian gymnast. He competed in eight events at the 1968 Summer Olympics.
