= Bozhidar Ivanov (gymnast) =

Bulgarian gymnast (born 1943)

- Божидар Иванов
- Born: 15 July 1943 (age 83) Ruse, Bulgaria

Gymnastics career
- Discipline: Men's artistic gymnastics
- Country represented: Bulgaria

Bozhidar Ivanov (Bulgarian: Божидар Иванов) (born 15 July 1943) is a Bulgarian gymnast. He competed in eight events at the 1968 Summer Olympics.
