= Wenche Sjong =

Norwegian artistic gymnast

Personal information
- Nationality: Norwegian
- Born: 27 April 1951 (age 74) Oslo, Norway

Sport
- Country: Norway
- Sport: Gymnastics
- Club: Njård

Wenche Sjong (born 27 April 1951) is a Norwegian artistic gymnast.

She was born in Oslo. She competed at the 1968 Summer Olympics, in individual all-around, team all-around, floor exercise, horse vault, uneven bars, and balance beam.
