= Yolanda Vega =

Cuban gymnast (born 1946)

Personal information
- Born: 27 June 1946 (age 78); Havana, Cuba

Sport
- Sport: Gymnastics

Yolanda Vega (born 27 June 1946) is a Cuban gymnast. She competed in six events at the 1968 Summer Olympics.
