= Nereida Bauta =

Cuban gymnast (born 1950)

Personal information
- Born: 14 July 1950 (age 74); Havana, Cuba

Sport
- Sport: Gymnastics

Nereida Bauta (born 14 July 1950) is a Cuban gymnast. She competed in six events at the 1968 Summer Olympics.
