= Helga Matschkur =

German gymnast

Personal information
- Nationality: German
- Born: 4 September 1943 (age 81); Ansbach, Germany

Sport
- Sport: Gymnastics

Helga Matschkur (born 4 September 1943) is a German gymnast. She competed in six events at the 1968 Summer Olympics.
