= Suzette Blanco =

Cuban gymnast (born 1948)

Personal information
- Born: 15 September 1948 (age 76); Havana, Cuba

Sport
- Sport: Gymnastics

Suzette Blanco (born 15 September 1948) is a Cuban gymnast. She competed in six events at the 1968 Summer Olympics.
