= Dorjiin Norolkhoo =

Mongolian gymnast (born 1949)

Personal information
- Nationality: Mongolian
- Born: 31 December 1949 (age 75); Ulaanbaatar, Mongolia

Sport
- Sport: Gymnastics

Dorjiin Norolkhoo (born 31 December 1949) is a Mongolian gymnast. She competed in five events at the 1968 Summer Olympics.
