= Halina Daniec =

Polish gymnast

Personal information
- Nationality: Polish
- Born: 25 January 1949; Świdnica, Poland
- Died: 30 April 2015 (aged 66); Vest-Agder, Norway

Sport
- Sport: Gymnastics

Halina Daniec (25 January 1949 – 30 April 2015) was a Polish gymnast. She competed in six events at the 1968 Summer Olympics.
