= Irmi Krauser =

German gymnast

Personal information
- Nationality: German
- Born: 14 January 1948 (age 77); Straubing, Germany

Sport
- Sport: Gymnastics

Irmi Krauser (born 14 January 1948) is a German gymnast. She competed in six events at the 1968 Summer Olympics.
