= Rosalinda Puente =

Mexican gymnast (born 1953)

Personal information
- Born: 7 August 1953 (age 71); Mexico City, Mexico

Sport
- Sport: Gymnastics

Rosalinda Puente (born 7 August 1953) is a Mexican gymnast. She competed in six events at the 1968 Summer Olympics.
