= Daniela Maccelli =

Italian gymnast (1949–2022)

Personal information
- Nationality: Italian
- Born: 8 December 1949; Barberino di Mugello, Italy
- Died: 27 November 2022 (aged 72); Prato, Italy

Sport
- Sport: Gymnastics

Daniela Maccelli (8 December 1949 – 27 November 2022) was an Italian gymnast. She competed at the 1968 Summer Olympics. At the time she belonged to the Etruria of Prato.
