= María Elena Ramírez =

Mexican gymnast (born 1951)

Personal information
- Born: 25 September 1951 (age 73); Mexico City, Mexico

Sport
- Sport: Gymnastics

María Elena Ramírez (born 25 September 1951) is a Mexican gymnast. She competed in six events at the 1968 Summer Olympics.
