= Łucja Ochmańska =

Polish gymnast

Personal information
- Nationality: Polish
- Born: 17 July 1949 (age 75); Kraków, Poland

Sport
- Sport: Gymnastics

Łucja Ochmańska (born 17 July 1949) is a Polish gymnast. She competed in six events at the 1968 Summer Olympics.
