= Nancy Aldama =

Cuban gymnast (born 1946)

Personal information
- Born: 28 August 1946 (age 78); Havana, Cuba

Sport
- Sport: Gymnastics

Nancy Aldama Ruiloba (born 28 August 1946) is a Cuban former gymnast. She competed in six events at the 1968 Summer Olympics.
