= María Luisa Morales =

Mexican gymnast (born 1954)

Personal information
- Born: 21 June 1954 (age 72) Minatitlán, Veracruz, Mexico

Sport
- Sport: Gymnastics

María Luisa Morales (born 21 June 1954) is a Mexican gymnast. She competed in six events at the 1968 Summer Olympics.
