= Françoise Nourry =

French gymnast

Personal information
- Nationality: French
- Born: 1 September 1948 (age 76); Bègles, France

Sport
- Sport: Gymnastics

Françoise Nourry (born 1 September 1948) is a French gymnast. She competed in six events at the 1968 Summer Olympics.
