= Anna Stein =

German gymnast

Personal information
- Nationality: German
- Born: 21 October 1949 (age 75); Novi Sad, Yugoslavia

Sport
- Sport: Gymnastics

Anna Stein (born 21 October 1949) is a German gymnast. She competed in six events at the 1968 Summer Olympics.
