= Julieta Sáenz =

Mexican gymnast (born 1954)

Personal information
- Born: 12 April 1954 (age 70); Mexico City, Mexico

Sport
- Sport: Gymnastics

Julieta Sáenz (born 12 April 1954) is a Mexican gymnast. She competed in six events at the 1968 Summer Olympics.
