= Zulema Bregado =

Cuban gymnast (born 1951)

Personal information
- Born: 31 January 1951 (age 74); Havana, Cuba

Sport
- Sport: Gymnastics

Zulema Bregado (born 31 January 1951) is a Cuban gymnast. She competed in six events at the 1968 Summer Olympics.
