= Else Trangbæk =

Danish gymnast (born 1946)

Personal information
- Nationality: Danish
- Born: 7 February 1946 (age 80) Viborg, Denmark

Sport
- Sport: Gymnastics

Else Trangbæk (née Thorsager; born 7 February 1946) is a Danish gymnast. She competed in five events at the 1968 Summer Olympics. After her retirement from active gymnastics – with 26 national titles between 1964 and 1970 – she continued her education, becoming a university professor for sports history, as well as a sports administrator.

== Professional career ==
After finishing middle school in 1962, she was trained as a bank clerk and passed the exam as banker in 1969. From 1972 to 1974, she continued her education in evening classes and passed the university entrance exam. She then started to study for a teaching degree in History and Physical Education. After getting her Diploma in Physical Education in 1978, she was hired as non-permanent lecturer in gymnastics by the Kopenhagen Sports Institute. In 1980, her position was converted into a permanent job. Continuing her history studies at Copenhagen University, she received her PhD in 1987. APS She was then promoted to Docent. From 1992 to 1997, she was Director of the Sport Institute and succeeded in the integration of the separate sport Institute as a Faculty in Copenhagen University. In 1997, her position was converted to a Docent of the University. From 2002 to 2006, she was section Head in the Faculty. In 2007, she was appointed full professor for Sport History. From 2007 to 2011, she was the Chairperson of the Sport Faculty. In 2011, she went into retirement. Additionally, she became External Researcher of the Centrum för Idrottsforskning, Stockholm. For her achievements she received the prestigious Women and Sport Award of the IOC which is only given to one woman per year per continent at the occasion of the World Women's Day.

== Research ==
Else Trangbæk has internationalized the Scandinavian experience and research in the history of women sports. She showed that public physical activities of women such as ice skating, bicycling, etc. played a more significant role in women's lives than serving as sports administrators would have. She started very early in interviewing active sports women of the first generation by means of Oral History. The WorldCat has 425 titles of her as of 26 November 2021.

== Honorary positions ==
- 1984–1996: Chair Danish sports historians
- 1987–1992: Member of the research Committee Danish elite sports
- 1996–1999: Chair research Committee Danish sports research
- 1996–2002: Vice president European committee for sports history
- 1997–2003: Chair Sport Committee City of Copenhagen
- 2002–2009: Member of the board of the Danish National Olympic Committee (DIF)
- 2004–2012: Member of the advisory committee of the Danish Ministry of Education
- 2008–2010: Member of the Board of Team Danmark (= Danish elite sports organization)
- Since 2008: Chair Danish Hall of Fame of Sports
- Since 2010: Vice President Team Danmark
