= Mary Prestidge =

British gymnast (born 1948)

Personal information
- Nationality: British
- Born: 18 December 1948 (age 76); London, England

Sport
- Sport: Gymnastics

Mary Prestidge (born 18 December 1948) is a British gymnast. She competed in five events at the 1968 Summer Olympics.
