= Rayna Atanasova =

Bulgarian gymnast (born 1944)

Personal information
- Nationality: Bulgarian
- Born: 10 July 1944 (age 80); Varna, Bulgaria

Sport
- Sport: Gymnastics

Rayna Atanasova (Bulgarian: Райна Атанасова) (born 10 July 1944) is a Bulgarian gymnast. She competed in six events at the 1968 Summer Olympics.
