= Christiane Goethals =

Belgian gymnast (born 1947)

Personal information
- Nationality: Belgian
- Born: 29 July 1947 (age 77); Bruges, Belgium

Sport
- Sport: Gymnastics

Christiane Goethals (Chris) (born 29 July 1947) is a Belgian gymnast. She competed in five events at the 1968 Summer Olympics.
