= Marlies Stegemann =

German gymnast

Personal information
- Nationality: German
- Born: 12 January 1951 (age 74); Wattenscheid, Germany

Sport
- Sport: Gymnastics

Marlies Stegemann (born 12 January 1951) is a German gymnast. She competed in six events at the 1968 Summer Olympics.
