= Petra Jebram =

German gymnast

Personal information
- Nationality: German
- Born: 23 March 1954 (age 71); Wattenscheid, Germany

Sport
- Sport: Gymnastics

Petra Jebram (born 23 March 1954) is a German gymnast. She competed in six events at the 1968 Summer Olympics.
