= Wendy Cluff =

American gymnast

Personal information
- Born: August 7, 1951 (age 73); Los Angeles, California, United States

Sport
- Sport: Gymnastics

Wendy Cluff (born August 7, 1951) is an American gymnast. She competed in six events at the 1968 Summer Olympics.
