= Rose-Marie Holm =

Swedish gymnast

Personal information
- Nationality: Swedish
- Born: 6 August 1953 (age 71); Landskrona, Sweden

Sport
- Sport: Gymnastics

Rose-Marie Holm (born 6 August 1953) is a Swedish gymnast. She competed in five events at the 1968 Summer Olympics.
