= Vesela Pasheva =

Bulgarian gymnast (born 1946)

Personal information
- Nationality: Bulgarian
- Born: 30 November 1946 (age 79) Ruse, Bulgaria

Sport
- Sport: Gymnastics

Vesela Pasheva (Bulgarian: Весела Пашева) (born 30 November 1946) is a Bulgarian gymnast. She competed in six events at the 1968 Summer Olympics.
