= Sandra Hartley =

Canadian gymnast

Personal information
- Nationality: Canadian
- Born: 23 June 1948 (age 78) Vancouver, British Columbia, Canada

Sport
- Sport: Gymnastics
Medal record
Representing Canada
Pan American Games
Silver medal – second place	1967 Winnipeg	Team

Sandra Hartley (born 23 June 1948) is a Canadian former gymnast. She competed in six events at the 1968 Summer Olympics. She won a silver medal in the women's all-around team event at the 1967 Pan American Games in Winnipeg.

== Career ==
Hartley was the senior ladies champion of British Columbia in 1965 for her age group, also placing second in the Saskatchewan Open Championships held earlier that year. She was a student of the University of British Columbia. In 1967, she "easily outclassed" gymnasts from various universities to capture the women's all-round title in the Western Canada Intercollegiate Athletic Association championships. Hartley won all four events and her closest competition was team-mate Leslie Bird. Throughout 1968, she collected all-around women's titles in the Canadian nationals and Pacific Northwest and national collegiate meets and along with Gil LaRose, led in the very first Olympic Gymnastic trials ever held in Canada when she was a student with the University of Washington. When she participated in the 1968 Summer Olympics, she was the Canadian national champion. In November 1969, she won the senior girls' compulsory competition at the North Vancouver Recreation Centre against Seattle Y.

By the 1970s, Hartley had a master's degree in Physical Education and was tutoring younger gymnasts a year after competing in the World Student Games. She became a coach in 1970 at the University of Alberta and in the summer of 1971 was named the chairman of the national gymnastic coaches organization. Upon her appointment, she expressed that it was the "first time a gymnast has gone from the bottom of the sport to become an executive". As a coach, she expressed a belief that gymnasts should start at a young age, ideally beginning training around the age of 11 or 12 when the body is agile, although didn't start the sport herself until the age of 14. She helped coach the Canadian national gymnastics team for the 1972 Summer Olympics.

== Later life ==
In 1992, she was inducted into the inaugural Hall of Fame at the University of British Columbia, which honored a long list of "great athletes". As a keen cyclist, she won a gold medal in 2005 in cycling at the World Masters Games.

In 2009, she was a guest speaker at the launch of Older Adult Fitness and Wellness, a new specialization program at the Grande Prairie Regional College. Known as Dr Sandra Hartley, she was a professor emeritus in gerontology, kinesiology and health psychology at the University of Alberta. She has also authored numerous original scientific papers on social and cognitive barriers in relation to motivation towards having an active lifestyle.

== Personal ==
She is married to Michael Faulkner.
