= Wiesława Lech =

Polish gymnast

Personal information
- Nationality: Polish
- Born: 20 October 1946 (age 78); Kraków, Poland

Sport
- Sport: Gymnastics

Wiesława Lech (born 20 October 1946) is a Polish gymnast. She competed in six events at the 1968 Summer Olympics.
