= Grażyna Witkowska =

Polish gymnast

Personal information
- Nationality: Polish
- Born: 22 June 1952 (age 72); Warsaw, Poland

Sport
- Sport: Gymnastics

Grażyna Witkowska (born 22 June 1952) is a Polish gymnast. She competed in six events at the 1968 Summer Olympics.
