= Rosario Briones =

Mexican gymnast (born 1953)

Personal information
- Born: 5 October 1953 (age 71); San Luis Potosí, Mexico

Sport
- Sport: Gymnastics

Rosario Briones (born 5 October 1953) is a Mexican gymnast. She competed in six events at the 1968 Summer Olympics.
