= Horta Van Hoye =

Belgian gymnast (born 1946)

Personal information
- Nationality: Belgian
- Born: 26 December 1946 (age 78); Sint-Joris-Weert, Belgium

Sport
- Sport: Gymnastics

Horta Van Hoye (born 26 December 1946) is a Belgian gymnast. She competed in five events at the 1968 Summer Olympics.
