= Margaret Bell (gymnast) =

British gymnast (born 1945)

Personal information
- Nationality: British
- Born: 23 February 1945; Beckenham, England
- Died: 23 April 2024 (aged 79)

Sport
- Sport: Gymnastics

Margaret Bell (23 February 1945 – 23 April 2024) was a British gymnast. She competed in five events at the 1968 Summer Olympics.
