= Dominique Lauvard =

French gymnast

Personal information
- Nationality: French
- Born: 30 August 1949 (age 77) Vincennes, France

Sport
- Sport: Gymnastics

Dominique Lauvard (born 30 August 1949) is a French gymnast. She competed in six events at the 1968 Summer Olympics.

== Biography ==
She competed in the 1968 Summer Olympics, finishing seventh in the team event.

She was crowned French champion in the individual all-around competition in 1969.
