= Nicole Bourdiau =

French gymnast

Personal information
- Nationality: French
- Born: 2 June 1948 (age 76); Écuisses, France

Sport
- Sport: Gymnastics

Nicole Bourdiau (born 2 June 1948) is a French gymnast. She competed in six events at the 1968 Summer Olympics.
