= Barbara Zięba =

Polish gymnast

Personal information
- Nationality: Polish
- Born: 20 March 1952 (age 73); Kraków, Poland

Sport
- Sport: Gymnastics

Barbara Zięba (born 20 March 1952) is a Polish gymnast. She competed in six events at the 1968 Summer Olympics.
