= Yu Mai-lee =

Taiwanese gymnast

Personal information
- Nationality: Taiwanese
- Born: 13 September 1952 (age 72); Zhejiang, China

Sport
- Sport: Gymnastics

Yu Mai-lee (traditional Chinese: 余美麗; simplified Chinese: 余美丽; pinyin: Yú Měilì; born 13 September 1952) is a Taiwanese gymnast. She competed in five events at the 1968 Summer Olympics.
