= Neli Stoyanova =

Bulgarian gymnast (born 1946)

Personal information
- Nationality: Bulgarian
- Born: 19 December 1946 (age 78); Varna, Bulgaria

Sport
- Sport: Gymnastics

Neli Stoyanova (Bulgarian: Нели Стоянова) (born 19 December 1946) is a Bulgarian gymnast. She competed in six events at the 1968 Summer Olympics.
