= Suzanne Cloutier (gymnast) =

Canadian gymnast (born 1947)

Personal information
- Born: 25 July 1947 (age 78); Sainte-Agathe-des-Monts, Quebec, Canada

Sport
- Sport: Gymnastics

Suzanne Cloutier (born 25 July 1947) is a Canadian gymnast. She competed in six events at the 1968 Summer Olympics.
