= Miriam Villacián =

Cuban gymnast (born 1950)

Personal information
- Born: 26 May 1950 (age 75); Havana, Cuba

Sport
- Sport: Gymnastics

Miriam Villacián (born 26 May 1950) is a Cuban gymnast. She competed in six events at the 1968 Summer Olympics.
