= Angelika Kern =

German gymnast

Personal information
- Nationality: German
- Born: 31 August 1952 (age 72); Emmendingen, Germany

Sport
- Sport: Gymnastics

Angelika Kern (born 31 August 1952) is a German gymnast. She competed at the 1968 Summer Olympics and the 1972 Summer Olympics.
