= Nataša Bajin-Šljepica =

Serbian gymnast (born 1945)

Personal information
- Nationality: Serbian
- Born: 29 September 1945; Belgrade, Yugoslavia
- Died: 13 May 2024 (aged 78)

Sport
- Sport: Gymnastics

Nataša Bajin-Šljepica (29 September 1945 – 13 May 2024) was a Serbian-Yugoslavian gymnast. She competed at the 1968 Summer Olympics and the 1972 Summer Olympics.
