= Mireille Cayre =

French gymnast (1947–2019)

Personal information
- Nationality: French
- Born: 2 April 1947; Moulins, France
- Died: 16 November 2019 (aged 72)

Sport
- Sport: Gymnastics

Mireille Cayre (2 April 1947 – 16 November 2019) was a French gymnast. She competed at the 1968 Summer Olympics and the 1972 Summer Olympics.
