= Adriana Biagiotti =

Italian sportsperson and gymnast

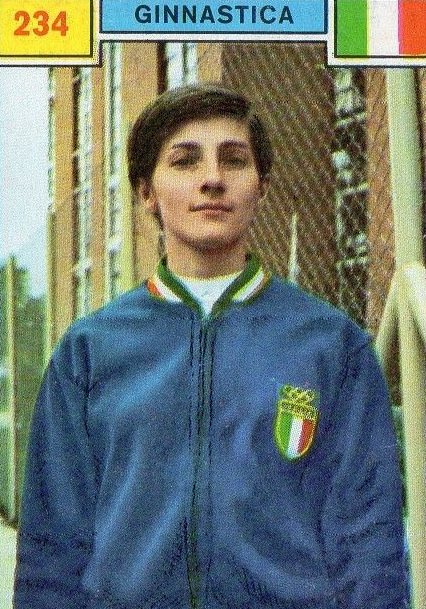

Personal information
- Born: 19 July 1947 (age 78) Prato, Italy
- Height: 160 cm (5 ft 3 in)
- Weight: 51 kg (112 lb)

Sport
- Sport: Artistic gymnastics
- Club: Etruria Prato

Adriana Biagiotti (born 19 July 1947) is a retired Italian gymnast. She competed at the 1968 Olympics in all artistic gymnastics events with the best result of 39th place on the vault.
