= Laura Rivera =

Mexican gymnast (born 1954)

Personal information
- Born: 17 October 1954 (age 70); Mexico City, Mexico

Sport
- Sport: Gymnastics

Laura Rivera (born 17 October 1954) is a Mexican gymnast. She competed at the 1968 Summer Olympics and the 1972 Summer Olympics.
