= Jill Kvamme-Schau =

Norwegian artistic gymnast

Personal information
- Nationality: Norwegian
- Born: 20 August 1948 (age 76); Bergen, Norway

Sport
- Country: Norway
- Sport: Gymnastics

Jill Kvamme-Schau (born 20 August 1948) is a Norwegian artistic gymnast.

She was born in Bergen. She competed at the 1968 Summer Olympics and the 1972 Summer Olympics.
