= Mariya Karashka =

Bulgarian artistic gymnast (born 1942)

Mariya Karashka (born 4 August 1942) is a Bulgarian former artistic gymnast. She competed at the 1968 Summer Olympics. In the ranking of the 1000 best gymnasts of all time, she occupies the 736th position.
