= Ann-Mari Hvaal =

Norwegian artistic gymnast

Personal information
- Nationality: Norwegian
- Born: 8 June 1944 (age 82) Sandefjord, Norway

Sport
- Country: Norway
- Sport: Gymnastics

Ann-Mari Hvaal (born 8 June 1944) is a Norwegian artistic gymnast. She was born in Sandefjord. She competed at the 1968 Summer Olympics.
