= Gabriella Pozzuolo =

Italian gymnast

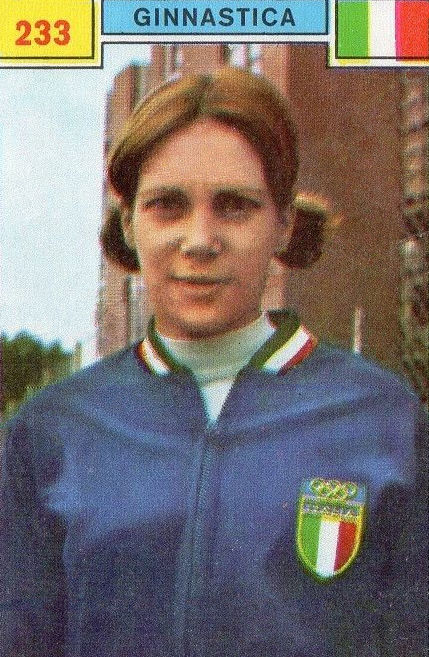

Personal information
- Born: 28 November 1946 (age 79) Genoa, Italy
- Height: 1.62 m (5 ft 4 in)
- Weight: 57 kg (126 lb)

Sport
- Sport: Artistic gymnastics
- Club: Andrea Doria, Genova

Gabriella Pozzuolo-Marchi (born 28 November 1946) is a retired Italian gymnast. She competed at the 1968 Olympics in all artistic gymnastics events with the best result of 59th place on the uneven bars.
