= Helga Braathen =

Norwegian artistic gymnast

Personal information
- Nationality: Norwegian
- Born: 5 March 1953; Drammen, Norway
- Died: 11 October 1982 (aged 29)

Sport
- Country: Norway
- Sport: Gymnastics

Helga Braathen (5 March 1953 – 11 October 1982) was a Norwegian artistic gymnast.

She was born in Drammen. She competed at the 1968 Summer Olympics. She died at 29 years old, suffering from anorexia nervosa.
