= Małgorzata Chojnacka (gymnast) =

Polish gymnast

Personal information
- Nationality: Polish
- Born: 20 September 1947 (age 79) Żochy, Poland

Sport
- Sport: Gymnastics

Małgorzata Chojnacka (born 20 September 1947) is a Polish gymnast. She competed in six events at the 1968 Summer Olympics.
