= Vanya Marinova =

Bulgarian artistic gymnast (born 1950)

Personal information
- Born: 22 October 1950 (age 75) Varna, Bulgaria
- Height: 165 cm (5 ft 5 in)
- Weight: 52 kg (115 lb)

Sport
- Sport: Artistic gymnastics

Vanya Marinova (Bulgarian: Ваня Маринова, born 22 October 1950) is a retired Bulgarian gymnast. She competed at the 1968 Summer Olympics in all artistic gymnastics events with the best result of 33rd place on the floor; her team finished eighth.
