= Torunn Isberg =

Norwegian artistic gymnast (1949–2026)

Personal information
- Nationality: Norwegian
- Born: 6 July 1949 Moss, Norway
- Died: 3 July 2026 (aged 76) Moss, Norway

Sport
- Country: Norway
- Sport: Gymnastics

Torunn Isberg (6 July 1949 – 3 July 2026) was a Norwegian artistic gymnast.

== Biography ==
Isberg was born in Moss on 6 July 1949.

She was first selected to represent Norway on the national team in 1965. Having won a national junior title in 1965, she became national champion as senior in 1967 and 1968. In 1966 she was the first gymnast from Norway to win an individual Nordic gold medal in gymnastics, in addition to the team title with the Norwegian team. She also represented Norway at the 1966 World Artistic Gymnastics Championships. She competed at the 1968 Summer Olympics.

Isberg died in Moss on 3 July 2026, at the age of 76.
