= Gymnastics at the 1968 Summer Olympics =

Gymnastics at the Games of the XIX Olympiad
- Venue: National Auditorium
- Dates: 21 October – 26 October 1968

At the 1968 Summer Olympics, fourteen different artistic gymnastics events were contested, eight for men and six for women. All events were held at the National Auditorium in Mexico City from October 21 through October 26.

== Format of competition ==
The scoring in all the events was similar to that of the gymnastics events at the 1960 Summer Olympics. The six best gymnasts on the apparatus in the team competition (by sum of two scores - for compulsory and optional routine) qualified for that apparatus finals. The new feature of the competition was in women's events: each of them was judged by four judges, like the men's competition. The highest and lowest marks were dropped and an average of two remaining marks constituted the score.

== Results ==
=== Men's events ===
Games	Gold	Silver	Bronze
Individual all-around	Sawao Kato; Japan	Mikhail Voronin; Soviet Union	Akinori Nakayama; Japan
Team all-around	Japan; Yukio Endo; Sawao Kato; Takeshi Katō; Eizo Kenmotsu; Akinori Nakayama; Mitsuo Tsukahara	Soviet Union; Sergei Diomidov; Valery Iljinykh; Valery Karasev; Viktor Klimenko; Victor Lisitsky; Mikhail Voronin	East Germany; Günter Beier; Matthias Brehme; Gerhard Dietrich; Siegfried Fülle; Klaus Köste; Peter Weber
Floor exercise	Sawao Kato; Japan	Akinori Nakayama; Japan	Takeshi Katō; Japan
Horizontal bar	Mikhail Voronin; Soviet Union	none awarded	Eizo Kenmotsu; Japan
Horizontal bar	Akinori Nakayama; Japan	none awarded	Eizo Kenmotsu; Japan
Parallel bars	Akinori Nakayama; Japan	Mikhail Voronin; Soviet Union	Viktor Klimenko; Soviet Union
Pommel horse	Miroslav Cerar; Yugoslavia	Olli Laiho; Finland	Mikhail Voronin; Soviet Union
Rings	Akinori Nakayama; Japan	Mikhail Voronin; Soviet Union	Sawao Kato; Japan
Vault	Mikhail Voronin; Soviet Union	Yukio Endo; Japan	Sergei Diomidov; Soviet Union

=== Women's events ===
Games	Gold	Silver	Bronze
Individual all-around	Věra Čáslavská; Czechoslovakia	Zinaida Voronina; Soviet Union	Natalia Kuchinskaya; Soviet Union
Team all-around	Soviet Union; Lyubov Burda; Olga Karasyova; Natalia Kuchinskaya; Larisa Petrik; Ludmilla Tourischeva; Zinaida Voronina	Czechoslovakia; Věra Čáslavská; Marianna Krajčírová; Jana Kubičková; Hana Lišková; Bohumila Řimnáčová; Miroslava Skleničková	East Germany; Maritta Bauerschmidt; Karin Janz; Marianne Noack; Magdalena Schmidt; Ute Starke; Erika Zuchold
Balance beam	Natalia Kuchinskaya; Soviet Union	Věra Čáslavská; Czechoslovakia	Larisa Petrik; Soviet Union
Floor exercise	Larisa Petrik; Soviet Union	none awarded	Natalia Kuchinskaya; Soviet Union
Floor exercise	Věra Čáslavská; Czechoslovakia	none awarded	Natalia Kuchinskaya; Soviet Union
Uneven bars	Věra Čáslavská; Czechoslovakia	Karin Janz; East Germany	Zinaida Voronina; Soviet Union
Vault	Věra Čáslavská; Czechoslovakia	Erika Zuchold; East Germany	Zinaida Voronina; Soviet Union

== Medal table ==
Rank	Nation	Gold	Silver	Bronze	Total
1	Japan	6	2	4	12
2	Soviet Union	5	5	8	18
3	Czechoslovakia	4	2	0	6
4	Yugoslavia	1	0	0	1
5	East Germany	0	2	2	4
6	Finland	0	1	0	1
Totals (6 entries)		16	12	14	42

== Čáslavská's public defiance of the Soviet Union ==
Larisa Petrik's gold medal on floor was very controversial because originally, Věra Čáslavská won outright. After the competition was concluded, Petrik's prelims scores were changed to let her tie with Čáslavská, an action which caused Čáslavská to publicly defy the Soviets who had recently invaded her home country during the Prague Spring. A similar controversy occurred in the balance beam, where Čáskavská was denied gold altogether.

== See also ==
- Olympic medalists in gymnastics (men)
- Olympic medalists in gymnastics (women)
