= Gymnastics at the 1972 Summer Olympics – Men's vault =

Olympic gymnastics event

Men's vault at the Games of the XX Olympiad
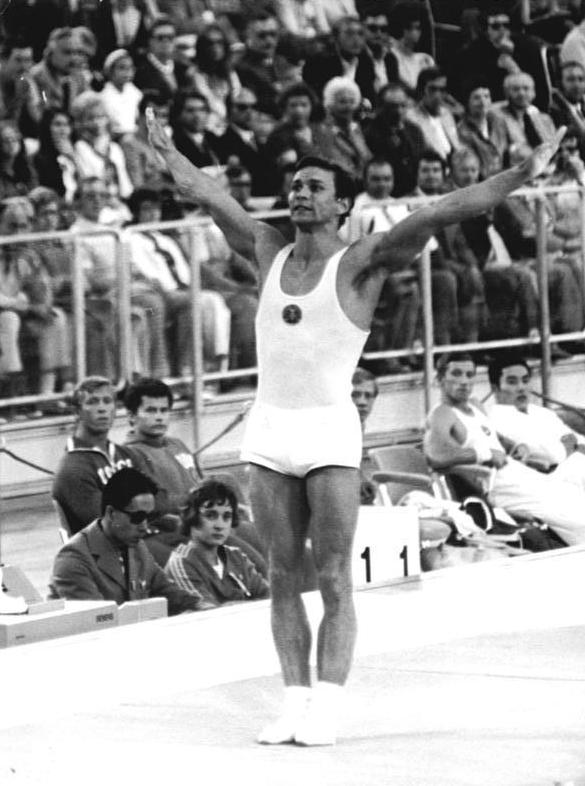
- Köste landing his winning vault
- Venue: Olympiahalle
- Date: 27 August–1 September 1976
- Competitors: 111 from 26 nations
- Winning score: 18.850

Medalists
1st place, gold medalist(s)		Klaus Köste	East Germany
2nd place, silver medalist(s)		Viktor Klimenko	Soviet Union
3rd place, bronze medalist(s)		Nikolai Andrianov	Soviet Union

These are the results of the men's vault competition, one of eight events for male competitors in artistic gymnastics at the 1972 Summer Olympics in Munich. The qualification and final rounds took place on August 27, 29 and September 1 at the Olympiahalle. There were 111 competitors from 26 nations (with 2 of the 113 gymnasts not starting in this apparatus); nations entering the team event had 6 gymnasts while other nations could have up to 3 gymnasts. The event was won by Klaus Köste of East Germany, the nation's first victory in the men's vault (or any men's individual gymnastics event). The Soviets took silver and bronze, respectively, from Viktor Klimenko and Nikolai Andrianov respectively.

== Background ==
This was the 13th appearance of the event, which is one of the five apparatus events held every time there were apparatus events at the Summer Olympics (no apparatus events were held in 1900, 1908, 1912, or 1920). Three of the six finalists from 1968 returned: gold medalist Mikhail Voronin of the Soviet Union fifth-place finisher Akinori Nakayama and sixth-place finisher Eizo Kenmotsu of Japan. The reigning world champion was Mitsuo Tsukahara of Japan, with Viktor Klimenko of the Soviet Union the runner-up.

Liechtenstein, New Zealand, and North Korea each made their debut in the men's vault. The United States made its 12th appearance, most of any nation, having missed only the inaugural 1896 Games.

== Competition format ==
The event used a "vaulting horse" aligned parallel to the gymnast's run (rather than the modern "vaulting table" in use since 2004). Each nation entered a team of six gymnasts or up to three individual gymnasts. All entrants in the gymnastics competitions performed both a compulsory exercise and a voluntary exercise for each apparatus. The scores for all 12 exercises were summed to give an individual all-around score. (One gymnast who entered the all-around competition did not perform on the vault.) These exercise scores were also used to qualify for the apparatus finals. The two exercises (compulsory and voluntary) for each apparatus were summed to give an apparatus score; the top 6 in each apparatus participated in the finals; others were ranked 7th through 113th. Half of the scores from the preliminary carried over to the final.

== Schedule ==
All times are Central European Time (UTC+1)

Date	Time	Round
Monday, 27 August 1972	11:15; 19:00	Preliminary: Compulsory
Wednesday, 29 August 1972	10:00; 18:00	Preliminary: Voluntary
Saturday, 1 September 1972	19:30	Final

== Results ==
One-hundred eleven gymnasts competed in the compulsory and optional rounds on August 27 and 29. The six highest scoring gymnasts advanced to the final on September 1.

Rank	Gymnast	Nation	Preliminary			Final		
Rank	Gymnast	Nation	Compulsory	Voluntary	Total	1/2 Prelim.	Final	Total
1st place, gold medalist(s)	Klaus Köste	East Germany	9.40	9.55	18.95	9.475	9.375	18.850
2nd place, silver medalist(s)	Viktor Klimenko	Soviet Union	9.50	9.30	18.80	9.400	9.425	18.825
3rd place, bronze medalist(s)	Nikolai Andrianov	Soviet Union	9.60	9.60	19.20	9.600	9.200	18.800
4	Eizo Kenmotsu	Japan	9.40	9.40	18.80	9.400	9.150	18.550
4	Sawao Kato	Japan	9.50	9.50	19.00	9.500	9.050	18.550
6	Peter Rohner	Switzerland	9.25	9.50	18.80	9.375	9.150	18.525
7	Matthias Brehme	East Germany	9.30	9.45	18.75	Did not advance		
7	Shigeru Kasamatsu	Japan	9.40	9.35	18.75	Did not advance		
7	Mikolaj Kubica	Poland	9.40	9.35	18.75	Did not advance		
10	Vladislav Nehasil	Czechoslovakia	9.20	9.50	18.70	Did not advance		
11	Imre Molnár	Hungary	9.40	9.25	18.65	Did not advance		
12	Zoltán Magyar	Hungary	9.25	9.35	18.60	Did not advance		
12	Akinori Nakayama	Japan	9.35	9.25	18.60	Did not advance		
12	Wolfgang Thüne	East Germany	9.20	9.40	18.60	Did not advance		
15	Petre Mihaiuc	Romania	9.20	9.35	18.55	Did not advance		
16	Robert Bretscher	Switzerland	9.20	9.30	18.50	Did not advance		
16	Wolfgang Klotz	East Germany	9.30	9.20	18.50	Did not advance		
16	Wilhelm Kubica	Poland	9.20	9.30	18.50	Did not advance		
16	Mikhail Voronin	Soviet Union	9.30	9.20	18.50	Did not advance		
20	Bohumil Mudrik	Czechoslovakia	9.15	9.30	18.45	Did not advance		
20	Jürgen Paeke	East Germany	9.20	9.25	18.45	Did not advance		
20	Gheorghe Paunescu	Romania	9.15	9.30	18.45	Did not advance		
23	Dan Grecu	Romania	9.35	9.05	18.40	Did not advance		
23	Sylwester Kubica	Poland	9.10	9.30	18.40	Did not advance		
23	Li Song-sob	North Korea	9.15	9.25	18.40	Did not advance		
23	Edvard Mikaelian	Soviet Union	9.25	9.15	18.40	Did not advance		
23	Reinhard Rychly	East Germany	9.10	9.30	18.40	Did not advance		
28	Jorge Cuervo	Cuba	8.95	9.40	18.35	Did not advance		
28	Makoto Sakamoto	United States	9.30	9.05	18.35	Did not advance		
30	Janez Brodnik	Yugoslavia	9.30	9.00	18.30	Did not advance		
30	Jifi Fejtek	Czechoslovakia	9.30	9.00	18.30	Did not advance		
30	Eberhard Gienger	West Germany	9.10	9.20	18.30	Did not advance		
30	Steven Hug	United States	9.15	9.15	18.30	Did not advance		
30	Alexander Maleev	Soviet Union	9.10	9.20	18.30	Did not advance		
30	Nicolae Oprescu	Romania	9.15	9.15	18.30	Did not advance		
30	Pavel Stanovsky	Czechoslovakia	9.05	9.25	18.30	Did not advance		
30	Mieczyslaw Strzalka	Poland	9.10	9.20	18.30	Did not advance		
38	Philippe Gaille	Switzerland	9.05	9.20	18.25	Did not advance		
38	Georges Guelzec	France	9.15	9.10	18.25	Did not advance		
38	Reinhard Ritter	West Germany	9.05	9.20	18.25	Did not advance		
41	Christian Guiffroy	France	9.05	9.15	18.20	Did not advance		
41	Vladimir Schukin	Soviet Union	9.00	9.20	18.20	Did not advance		
41	Andrzej Szajna	Poland	9.30	8.90	18.20	Did not advance		
41	Miloš Vratič	Yugoslavia	9.25	8.95	18.20	Did not advance		
45	John Crosby Jr.	United States	8.90	9.25	18.15	Did not advance		
45	Stefan Zoev	Bulgaria	8.90	9.25	18.15	Did not advance		
47	Marshall Avener	United States	8.95	9.15	18.10	Did not advance		
47	Bernd Effing	West Germany	8.80	9.30	18.10	Did not advance		
47	Ivica Hmjelovac	Yugoslavia	9.00	9.10	18.10	Did not advance		
47	Milenko Kersnic	Yugoslavia	9.15	8.95	18.10	Did not advance		
47	Antal Kisteleki	Hungary	9.00	9.10	18.10	Did not advance		
52	István Bérczi	Hungary	8.85	9.20	18.05	Did not advance		
52	Kim Song-yu	North Korea	8.85	9.20	18.05	Did not advance		
54	Jim Culhane Jr.	United States	9.10	8.90	18.00	Did not advance		
54	Mircea Gheorghiu	Romania	9.00	9.00	18.00	Did not advance		
54	Zoran Ivanovic	Yugoslavia	9.05	8.95	18.00	Did not advance		
54	István Kiss	Hungary	8.95	9.05	18.00	Did not advance		
54	Jerzy Kruza	Poland	8.95	9.05	18.00	Did not advance		
54	Peter Lloyd	Australia	9.05	8.95	18.00	Did not advance		
54	Rogelio Mendoza	Mexico	8.70	9.30	18.00	Did not advance		
54	Teruichi Okamura	Japan	9.20	8.80	18.00	Did not advance		
54	Günter Spies	West Germany	9.15	8.85	18.00	Did not advance		
54	Cecilio Ugarte	Spain	8.80	9.20	18.00	Did not advance		
64	Bernard Farjat	France	8.90	9.05	17.95	Did not advance		
64	Jean-Pierre Miens	France	9.10	8.85	17.95	Did not advance		
64	Ladislav Morava	Czechoslovakia	8.80	9.15	17.95	Did not advance		
64	Walter Mossinger	West Germany	9.10	8.85	17.95	Did not advance		
64	Shin Heung-do	North Korea	9.00	8.95	17.95	Did not advance		
64	Drago Sostaric	Yugoslavia	9.05	8.90	17.95	Did not advance		
64	Stan Wild	Great Britain	8.75	9.20	17.95	Did not advance		
71	Béla Herczeg	Hungary	9.20	8.70	17.90	Did not advance		
71	Ho Yun-hang	North Korea	8.65	9.25	17.90	Did not advance		
71	Mauno Nissinen	Finland	9.00	8.90	17.90	Did not advance		
71	Terry Sale	New Zealand	9.00	8.90	17.90	Did not advance		
71	Mitsuo Tsukahara	Japan	9.10	8.80	17.90	Did not advance		
76	Eddie Arnold	Great Britain	8.65	9.20	17.85	Did not advance		
76	Edwin Greutmann	Switzerland	9.10	8.75	17.85	Did not advance		
76	Jorge Rodriguez	Cuba	8.75	9.10	17.85	Did not advance		
79	Jo Jong-ryol	North Korea	8.40	9.40	17.80	Did not advance		
79	Kim Song-il	North Korea	8.70	9.10	17.80	Did not advance		
79	Constantin Petrescu	Romania	8.80	9.00	17.80	Did not advance		
82	Steve Mitruk	Canada	8.70	9.05	17.75	Did not advance		
83	José Ginés	Spain	8.70	9.00	17.70	Did not advance		
83	Geno Radev	Bulgaria	8.65	9.05	17.70	Did not advance		
85	Dimitar Dimitrov	Bulgaria	8.70	8.95	17.65	Did not advance		
85	Emilio Sagre	Cuba	8.75	8.90	17.65	Did not advance		
87	Christian Deuza	France	8.90	8.70	17.60	Did not advance		
88	Bruno Banzer	Liechtenstein	8.85	8.70	17.55	Did not advance		
88	Tore Lie	Norway	8.80	8.75	17.55	Did not advance		
88	Luis Ramirez	Cuba	8.50	9.05	17.55	Did not advance		
91	René Badell	Cuba	8.80	8.70	17.50	Did not advance		
91	Bill Norgrave	Great Britain	8.60	8.90	17.50	Did not advance		
93	Max Brühwiler	Switzerland	8.95	8.50	17.45	Did not advance		
93	André Simard	Canada	8.50	8.95	17.45	Did not advance		
95	Henri Boërio	France	9.00	8.40	17.40	Did not advance		
95	Luigi Coppa	Italy	8.65	8.75	17.40	Did not advance		
95	Franco Donega	Italy	8.75	8.65	17.40	Did not advance		
95	George Greenfield	United States	8.80	8.60	17.40	Did not advance		
95	Maurizio Milanetto	Italy	8.80	8.60	17.40	Did not advance		
100	Heinz Häussler	West Germany	8.70	8.60	17.30	Did not advance		
100	Agustin Sandoval	Spain	8.60	8.70	17.30	Did not advance		
102	Carmine Luppino	Italy	8.75	8.50	17.25	Did not advance		
103	Ian Clarke	Australia	8.50	8.70	17.20	Did not advance		
103	Ivan Kondev	Bulgaria	8.35	8.85	17.20	Did not advance		
105	Adolfo Lampronti	Italy	8.70	8.35	17.05	Did not advance		
106	Bozhidar Iliev	Bulgaria	8.35	8.60	16.95	Did not advance		
107	Ole Benediktson	Denmark	8.05	8.85	16.90	Did not advance		
108	Roberto Léon Richards	Cuba	8.10	8.75	16.85	Did not advance		
109	Dimitar Koychev	Bulgaria	8.50	8.25	16.75	Did not advance		
110	Fedele Spatazza	Italy	7.00	8.00	15.00	Did not advance		
111	Miloslav Netusil	Czechoslovakia	9.20	0.00	9.20	Did not advance		
—	Hans Ettlin	Switzerland	DNS			Did not advance		
—	Bruce Medd	Canada	DNS			Did not advance		
