= Gymnastics at the 1972 Summer Olympics – Men's pommel horse =

Olympic gymnastics event

Men's pommel horse at the Games of the XX Olympiad
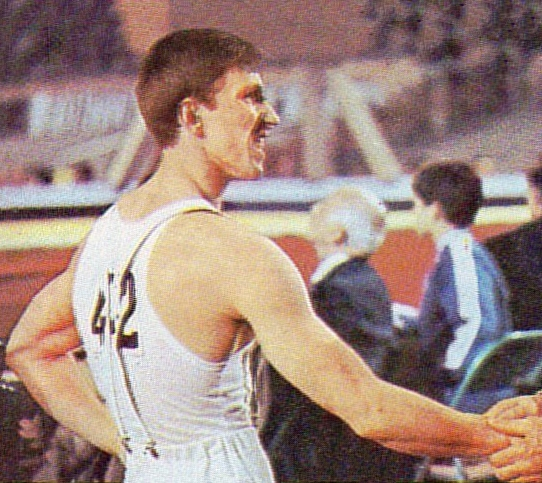
- Viktor Klimenko
- Venue: Olympiahalle
- Dates: 27 August – 1 September 1976
- Competitors: 111 from 26 nations
- Winning score: 19.125

Medalists
1st place, gold medalist(s)		Viktor Klimenko; Soviet Union
2nd place, silver medalist(s)		Sawao Kato; Japan
3rd place, bronze medalist(s)		Eizo Kenmotsu; Japan

These are the results of the men's pommel horse competition, one of eight events for male competitors in artistic gymnastics at the 1972 Summer Olympics in Munich. The qualification and final rounds took place on August 27, 29 and September 1 at the Sports Hall. There were 111 competitors from 26 nations (with 2 of the 113 gymnasts not starting in this apparatus); nations entering the team event had 6 gymnasts while other nations could have up to 3 gymnasts. The event was won by Viktor Klimenko of the Soviet Union, the nation's fourth victory in the men's pommel horse. Sawao Kato (silver) and Eizo Kenmotsu (bronze) returned Japan to the pommel horse podium after a one-Games absence.

== Background ==
This was the 13th appearance of the event, which is one of the five apparatus events held every time there were apparatus events at the Summer Olympics (no apparatus events were held in 1900, 1908, 1912, or 1920). Four of the six finalists from 1968 returned: bronze medalist Mikhail Voronin of the Soviet Union, fourth-place finisher Wilhelm Kubica of Poland, fifth-place finisher Eizo Kenmotsu of Japan, and sixth-place finisher Viktor Klimenko of the Soviet Union. Three-time world champion and two-time gold medalist Miroslav Cerar of Yugoslavia had retired in 1970, leaving the field open to other competitors. Kenmotsu and Klimenko had finished second and third at the 1970 World Championships.

Liechtenstein, New Zealand, and North Korea each made their debut in the men's pommel horse. The United States made its 12th appearance, most of any nation, having missed only the inaugural 1896 Games.

== Competition format ==
Each nation entered a team of six gymnasts or up to three individual gymnasts. All entrants in the gymnastics competitions performed both a compulsory exercise and a voluntary exercise for each apparatus. The scores for all 12 exercises were summed to give an individual all-around score. (One gymnast who entered the all-around competition did not perform on the vault.) These exercise scores were also used for qualification for the apparatus finals. The two exercises (compulsory and voluntary) for each apparatus were summed to give an apparatus score; the top 6 in each apparatus participated in the finals; others were ranked 7th through 111th. Half of the scores from the preliminary carried over to the final.

== Schedule ==
All times are Central European Time (UTC+1)

Date	Time	Round
Monday, 27 August 1972	11:15; 19:00	Preliminary: Compulsory
Wednesday, 29 August 1972	10:00; 18:00	Preliminary: Voluntary
Saturday, 1 September 1972	19:30	Final

== Results ==
One-hundred eleven gymnasts competed in the compulsory and optional rounds on August 27 and 29. The six highest scoring gymnasts advanced to the final on September 1.

Rank	Gymnast	Nation	Preliminary			Final		
Rank	Gymnast	Nation	Compulsory	Voluntary	Total	1/2 Prelim.	Final	Total
1st place, gold medalist(s)	Viktor Klimenko	Soviet Union	9.50	9.55	19.05	9.525	9.600	19.125
2nd place, silver medalist(s)	Sawao Kato	Japan	9.40	9.60	19.00	9.500	9.500	19.000
3rd place, bronze medalist(s)	Eizo Kenmotsu	Japan	9.50	9.60	19.10	9.550	9.400	18.950
4	Shigeru Kasamatsu	Japan	9.50	9.55	19.05	9.525	9.400	18.925
5	Mikhail Voronin	Soviet Union	9.40	9.45	18.85	9.425	9.450	18.875
6	Wilhelm Kubica	Poland	9.15	9.55	18.70	9.350	9.400	18.750
7	Akinori Nakayama	Japan	9.30	9.40	18.70	Did not advance		
8	Matthias Brehme	East Germany	9.25	9.35	18.60	Did not advance		
8	Edvard Mikaelian	Soviet Union	9.35	9.25	18.60	Did not advance		
8	Imre Molnár	Hungary	9.20	9.40	18.60	Did not advance		
11	Steven Hug	United States	9.15	9.40	18.55	Did not advance		
11	Mikolaj Kubica	Poland	9.15	9.40	18.55	Did not advance		
13	Klaus Köste	East Germany	9.20	9.30	18.50	Did not advance		
14	Jürgen Paeke	East Germany	9.20	9.25	18.45	Did not advance		
14	Wolfgang Thüne	East Germany	9.45	9.00	18.45	Did not advance		
16	Jifi Fejtek	Czechoslovakia	9.10	9.25	18.35	Did not advance		
17	Nikolai Andrianov	Soviet Union	9.50	8.80	18.30	Did not advance		
17	Sylwester Kubica	Poland	9.10	9.20	18.30	Did not advance		
19	Marshall Avener	United States	8.95	9.30	18.25	Did not advance		
19	Alexander Maleev	Soviet Union	9.15	9.10	18.25	Did not advance		
19	Reinhard Ritter	West Germany	9.05	9.20	18.25	Did not advance		
22	Mauno Nissinen	Finland	9.10	9.10	18.20	Did not advance		
23	Wolfgang Klotz	East Germany	9.10	9.05	18.15	Did not advance		
24	Milenko Kersnic	Yugoslavia	8.90	9.20	18.10	Did not advance		
24	Zoltán Magyar	Hungary	9.05	9.05	18.10	Did not advance		
24	Roberto Léon Richards	Cuba	8.75	9.35	18.10	Did not advance		
24	Vladimir Schukin	Soviet Union	9.05	9.05	18.10	Did not advance		
28	Mieczyslaw Strzalka	Poland	8.95	9.10	18.05	Did not advance		
29	Max Brühwiler	Switzerland	8.90	9.10	18.00	Did not advance		
29	Béla Herczeg	Hungary	8.85	9.15	18.00	Did not advance		
29	Teruichi Okamura	Japan	9.05	8.95	18.00	Did not advance		
32	Ladislav Morava	Czechoslovakia	8.85	9.10	17.95	Did not advance		
32	Reinhard Rychly	East Germany	8.90	9.05	17.95	Did not advance		
34	Bernd Effing	West Germany	8.80	9.10	17.90	Did not advance		
34	Li Song-sob	North Korea	8.85	9.05	17.90	Did not advance		
34	Andrzej Szajna	Poland	8.90	9.00	17.90	Did not advance		
34	Mitsuo Tsukahara	Japan	9.20	8.70	17.90	Did not advance		
38	Petre Mihaiuc	Romania	8.80	9.05	17.85	Did not advance		
39	Mircea Gheorghiu	Romania	8.75	9.05	17.80	Did not advance		
39	Heinz Häussler	West Germany	8.95	8.85	17.80	Did not advance		
41	Robert Bretscher	Switzerland	8.80	8.95	17.75	Did not advance		
41	Dan Grecu	Romania	8.65	9.10	17.75	Did not advance		
41	Walter Mossinger	West Germany	8.90	8.85	17.75	Did not advance		
41	Stefan Zoev	Bulgaria	9.00	8.75	17.75	Did not advance		
45	István Bérczi	Hungary	8.70	9.00	17.70	Did not advance		
45	Zoran Ivanovic	Yugoslavia	8.70	9.00	17.70	Did not advance		
45	Kim Song-yu	North Korea	8.60	9.10	17.70	Did not advance		
45	István Kiss	Hungary	8.70	9.00	17.70	Did not advance		
45	Tore Lie	Norway	8.65	9.05	17.70	Did not advance		
45	Peter Rohner	Switzerland	8.95	8.75	17.70	Did not advance		
45	Miloš Vratič	Yugoslavia	8.40	9.30	17.70	Did not advance		
52	Jerzy Kruza	Poland	8.75	8.85	17.60	Did not advance		
52	Gheorghe Paunescu	Romania	8.65	8.95	17.60	Did not advance		
54	Ho Yun-hang	North Korea	8.55	9.00	17.55	Did not advance		
55	Franco Donega	Italy	8.55	8.95	17.50	Did not advance		
55	Kim Song-il	North Korea	8.45	9.05	17.50	Did not advance		
55	Jean-Pierre Miens	France	8.50	9.00	17.50	Did not advance		
58	Bohumil Mudrik	Czechoslovakia	8.70	8.75	17.45	Did not advance		
59	Shin Heung-do	North Korea	8.35	9.05	17.40	Did not advance		
60	Bruno Banzer	Liechtenstein	8.35	9.00	17.35	Did not advance		
60	Pavel Stanovsky	Czechoslovakia	9.00	8.35	17.35	Did not advance		
62	Steve Mitruk	Canada	8.70	8.60	17.30	Did not advance		
63	Jim Culhane Jr.	United States	8.35	8.90	17.25	Did not advance		
64	Philippe Gaille	Switzerland	8.70	8.50	17.20	Did not advance		
64	Antal Kisteleki	Hungary	8.20	9.00	17.20	Did not advance		
66	Jo Jong-ryol	North Korea	8.80	8.35	17.15	Did not advance		
67	Janez Brodnik	Yugoslavia	8.05	9.05	17.10	Did not advance		
68	Christian Deuza	France	8.75	8.25	17.00	Did not advance		
69	Eberhard Gienger	West Germany	9.10	7.85	16.95	Did not advance		
69	Vladislav Nehasil	Czechoslovakia	8.30	8.65	16.95	Did not advance		
71	Edwin Greutmann	Switzerland	8.30	8.60	16.90	Did not advance		
71	Jorge Rodriguez	Cuba	8.00	8.90	16.90	Did not advance		
73	Stan Wild	Great Britain	7.95	8.90	16.85	Did not advance		
74	Ole Benediktson	Denmark	8.35	8.45	16.80	Did not advance		
75	Bernard Farjat	France	7.90	8.85	16.75	Did not advance		
76	Günter Spies	West Germany	7.90	8.75	16.65	Did not advance		
77	John Crosby Jr.	United States	7.75	8.85	16.60	Did not advance		
78	Drago Sostaric	Yugoslavia	7.80	8.75	16.55	Did not advance		
79	Luigi Coppa	Italy	7.50	9.00	16.50	Did not advance		
80	Dimitar Koychev	Bulgaria	8.05	8.35	16.40	Did not advance		
80	Geno Radev	Bulgaria	7.75	8.65	16.40	Did not advance		
82	Christian Guiffroy	France	7.55	8.70	16.25	Did not advance		
83	René Badell	Cuba	7.55	8.60	16.15	Did not advance		
83	Nicolae Oprescu	Romania	7.45	8.70	16.15	Did not advance		
85	Maurizio Milanetto	Italy	7.80	8.30	16.10	Did not advance		
86	Constantin Petrescu	Romania	8.85	7.15	16.00	Did not advance		
86	Agustin Sandoval	Spain	7.80	8.20	16.00	Did not advance		
88	Jorge Cuervo	Cuba	7.20	8.75	15.95	Did not advance		
89	Ivan Kondev	Bulgaria	7.50	8.40	15.90	Did not advance		
90	Peter Lloyd	Australia	7.30	8.40	15.70	Did not advance		
91	Bill Norgrave	Great Britain	7.60	8.00	15.60	Did not advance		
92	Carmine Luppino	Italy	6.90	8.60	15.50	Did not advance		
93	Ivica Hmjelovac	Yugoslavia	7.55	7.80	15.35	Did not advance		
94	Cecilio Ugarte	Spain	7.70	7.60	15.30	Did not advance		
95	Henri Boërio	France	6.75	8.35	15.10	Did not advance		
95	Bozhidar Iliev	Bulgaria	7.25	7.85	15.10	Did not advance		
97	George Greenfield	United States	6.35	8.70	15.05	Did not advance		
97	Georges Guelzec	France	7.25	7.80	15.05	Did not advance		
99	André Simard	Canada	6.35	8.50	14.85	Did not advance		
100	Rogelio Mendoza	Mexico	6.00	8.70	14.70	Did not advance		
101	Adolfo Lampronti	Italy	7.35	7.20	14.55	Did not advance		
101	Terry Sale	New Zealand	6.50	8.05	14.55	Did not advance		
103	José Ginés	Spain	7.00	7.40	14.40	Did not advance		
104	Emilio Sagre	Cuba	5.95	8.35	14.30	Did not advance		
105	Makoto Sakamoto	United States	5.35	8.75	14.10	Did not advance		
105	Fedele Spatazza	Italy	5.75	8.35	14.10	Did not advance		
107	Eddie Arnold	Great Britain	6.65	7.25	13.90	Did not advance		
108	Dimitar Dimitrov	Bulgaria	5.50	8.00	13.50	Did not advance		
109	Ian Clarke	Australia	5.00	7.95	12.95	Did not advance		
110	Luis Ramirez	Cuba	4.55	8.35	12.90	Did not advance		
111	Miloslav Netusil	Czechoslovakia	9.25	0.00	9.25	Did not advance		
—	Hans Ettlin	Switzerland	DNS			Did not advance		
—	Bruce Medd	Canada	DNS			Did not advance		
