= Gymnastics at the 1972 Summer Olympics – Men's rings =

Olympic gymnastics event

Men's rings at the Games of the XX Olympiad
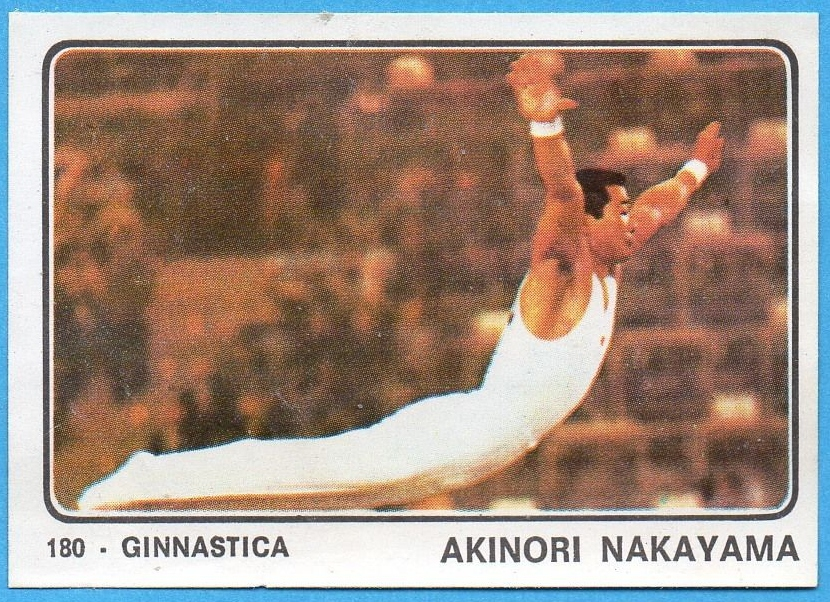
- Akinori Nakayama
- Venue: Olympiahalle
- Dates: 27 August – 1 September 1976
- Competitors: 111 from 26 nations

Medalists
1st place, gold medalist(s)		Akinori Nakayama	Japan
2nd place, silver medalist(s)		Mikhail Voronin	Soviet Union
3rd place, bronze medalist(s)		Mitsuo Tsukahara	Japan

The men's rings competition was one of eight events for male competitors in artistic gymnastics at the 1972 Summer Olympics in Munich. The qualification and final rounds took place on August 27, 29 and September 1 at the Olympiahalle. There were 111 competitors from 26 nations (with 2 of the 113 gymnasts not starting in this apparatus); nations entering the team event had 6 gymnasts while other nations could have up to 3 gymnasts. The top two places were the same as in 1968, while the next two places were taken by the same gymnasts but in the opposite order. The event was won by Akinori Nakayama of Japan, the nation's third consecutive victory in the men's rings; Nakayama was the second man to successfully defend an Olympic title in the event. Mikhail Voronin's second consecutive silver extended the Soviet Union's podium streak in the rings to six Games. Nakayama and Voronin were the fifth and sixth men to earn multiple medals in the rings. Mitsuo Tsukahara of Japan took bronze, switching places with fourth-place finisher Sawao Kato from the previous Games (where Kato took bronze and Tsukahara fourth).

== Background ==
This was the 13th appearance of the event, which is one of the five apparatus events held every time there were apparatus events at the Summer Olympics (no apparatus events were held in 1900, 1908, 1912, or 1920). Four of the six finalists from 1968 returned: gold medalist Akinori Nakayama of Japan, silver medalist Mikhail Voronin of the Soviet Union, bronze medalist Sawao Kato of Japan, and fourth-place finisher Mitsuo Tsukahara of Japan. Nakayama, Tsukahara, and Voronin (in that order) had comprised the podium at the 1970 World Championships.

Liechtenstein, New Zealand, and North Korea each made their debut in the men's rings. The United States made its 12th appearance, most of any nation, having missed only the inaugural 1896 Games.

== Competition format ==
Each nation entered a team of six gymnasts or up to three individual gymnasts. All entrants in the gymnastics competitions performed both a compulsory exercise and a voluntary exercise for each apparatus. The scores for all 12 exercises were summed to give an individual all-around score. (One gymnast who entered the all-around competition did not perform on the vault.) These exercise scores were also used for qualification for the apparatus finals. The two exercises (compulsory and voluntary) for each apparatus were summed to give an apparatus score; the top 6 in each apparatus participated in the finals; others were ranked 7th through 111th. Half of the scores from the preliminary carried over to the final.

== Schedule ==
All times are Central European Time (UTC+1)

Date	Time	Round
Monday, 27 August 1972	11:15; 19:00	Preliminary: Compulsory
Wednesday, 29 August 1972	10:00; 18:00	Preliminary: Voluntary
Saturday, 1 September 1972	19:30	Final

== Results ==
One-hundred eleven gymnasts competed in the compulsory and optional rounds on August 27 and 29. The six highest scoring gymnasts advanced to the final on September 1.

Rank	Gymnast	Nation	Preliminary			Final		
Rank	Gymnast	Nation	Compulsory	Voluntary	Total	1/2 Prelim.	Final	Total
1st place, gold medalist(s)	Akinori Nakayama	Japan	9.70	9.70	19.40	9.700	9.650	19.350
2nd place, silver medalist(s)	Mikhail Voronin	Soviet Union	9.60	9.65	19.25	9.625	9.650	19.275
3rd place, bronze medalist(s)	Mitsuo Tsukahara	Japan	9.45	9.60	19.05	9.525	9.700	19.225
4	Sawao Kato	Japan	9.50	9.60	19.10	9.550	9.600	19.150
5	Eizo Kenmotsu	Japan	9.60	9.50	19.10	9.550	9.400	18.950
5	Klaus Köste	East Germany	9.45	9.55	19.00	9.500	9.450	18.950
7	Nikolai Andrianov	Soviet Union	9.50	9.50	19.00	Did not advance		
8	Shin Heung-do	North Korea	9.30	9.65	18.95	Did not advance		
9	Teruichi Okamura	Japan	9.45	9.45	18.90	Did not advance		
10	Andrzej Szajna	Poland	9.40	9.45	18.85	Did not advance		
10	Wolfgang Thüne	East Germany	9.50	9.35	18.85	Did not advance		
12	Matthias Brehme	East Germany	9.40	9.40	18.80	Did not advance		
12	Shigeru Kasamatsu	Japan	9.30	9.50	18.80	Did not advance		
12	Sylwester Kubica	Poland	9.30	9.50	18.80	Did not advance		
12	Edvard Mikaelian	Soviet Union	9.45	9.35	18.80	Did not advance		
16	Viktor Klimenko	Soviet Union	9.40	9.30	18.70	Did not advance		
16	Wolfgang Klotz	East Germany	9.40	9.30	18.70	Did not advance		
16	Walter Mossinger	West Germany	9.30	9.40	18.70	Did not advance		
19	Makoto Sakamoto	United States	9.35	9.30	18.65	Did not advance		
20	Dan Grecu	Romania	9.20	9.30	18.50	Did not advance		
20	Mikolaj Kubica	Poland	9.20	9.30	18.50	Did not advance		
22	Li Song-sob	North Korea	8.90	9.50	18.40	Did not advance		
22	Alexander Maleev	Soviet Union	9.25	9.15	18.40	Did not advance		
22	Vladimir Schukin	Soviet Union	9.10	9.30	18.40	Did not advance		
22	Günter Spies	West Germany	9.20	9.20	18.40	Did not advance		
26	Eberhard Gienger	West Germany	9.10	9.25	18.35	Did not advance		
26	Kim Song-yu	North Korea	9.00	9.35	18.35	Did not advance		
28	Marshall Avener	United States	9.15	9.15	18.30	Did not advance		
29	Jifi Fejtek	Czechoslovakia	9.15	9.10	18.25	Did not advance		
29	Imre Molnár	Hungary	9.10	9.15	18.25	Did not advance		
31	Peter Rohner	Switzerland	9.15	9.05	18.20	Did not advance		
31	Reinhard Rychly	East Germany	9.00	9.20	18.20	Did not advance		
33	Janez Brodnik	Yugoslavia	9.05	9.05	18.10	Did not advance		
33	Ho Yun-hang	North Korea	8.95	9.15	18.10	Did not advance		
33	Wilhelm Kubica	Poland	8.80	9.30	18.10	Did not advance		
33	Petre Mihaiuc	Romania	8.90	9.20	18.10	Did not advance		
37	Steven Hug	United States	9.00	9.05	18.05	Did not advance		
37	Vladislav Nehasil	Czechoslovakia	9.05	9.00	18.05	Did not advance		
37	Nicolae Oprescu	Romania	9.00	9.05	18.05	Did not advance		
40	István Kiss	Hungary	8.90	9.10	18.00	Did not advance		
41	Jo Jong-ryol	North Korea	8.70	9.25	17.95	Did not advance		
42	Antal Kisteleki	Hungary	9.00	8.90	17.90	Did not advance		
42	Mauno Nissinen	Finland	8.90	9.00	17.90	Did not advance		
42	Pavel Stanovsky	Czechoslovakia	8.95	8.95	17.90	Did not advance		
42	Mieczyslaw Strzalka	Poland	8.80	9.10	17.90	Did not advance		
46	Reinhard Ritter	West Germany	8.95	8.85	17.80	Did not advance		
47	George Greenfield	United States	8.85	8.90	17.75	Did not advance		
47	Zoltán Magyar	Hungary	9.00	8.75	17.75	Did not advance		
49	Philippe Gaille	Switzerland	8.85	8.85	17.70	Did not advance		
49	Kim Song-il	North Korea	8.70	9.00	17.70	Did not advance		
49	Jürgen Paeke	East Germany	8.50	9.20	17.70	Did not advance		
52	Dimitar Koychev	Bulgaria	8.90	8.75	17.65	Did not advance		
52	Ladislav Morava	Czechoslovakia	8.80	8.85	17.65	Did not advance		
54	Edwin Greutmann	Switzerland	9.00	8.60	17.60	Did not advance		
55	Jorge Cuervo	Cuba	8.75	8.80	17.55	Did not advance		
55	Jerzy Kruza	Poland	8.55	9.00	17.55	Did not advance		
55	Miloš Vratič	Yugoslavia	8.75	8.80	17.55	Did not advance		
58	Max Brühwiler	Switzerland	8.60	8.90	17.50	Did not advance		
58	Heinz Häussler	West Germany	8.55	8.95	17.50	Did not advance		
58	Cecilio Ugarte	Spain	8.65	8.85	17.50	Did not advance		
61	Bernd Effing	West Germany	8.60	8.85	17.45	Did not advance		
61	Gheorghe Paunescu	Romania	8.60	8.85	17.45	Did not advance		
63	Adolfo Lampronti	Italy	8.50	8.85	17.35	Did not advance		
64	Jim Culhane Jr.	United States	8.50	8.80	17.30	Did not advance		
65	Dimitar Dimitrov	Bulgaria	8.65	8.55	17.20	Did not advance		
65	Ivica Hmjelovac	Yugoslavia	8.50	8.70	17.20	Did not advance		
65	Bohumil Mudrik	Czechoslovakia	8.45	8.75	17.20	Did not advance		
65	Stefan Zoev	Bulgaria	8.60	8.60	17.20	Did not advance		
69	Henri Boërio	France	8.55	8.60	17.15	Did not advance		
69	Ivan Kondev	Bulgaria	8.40	8.75	17.15	Did not advance		
69	Jean-Pierre Miens	France	8.65	8.50	17.15	Did not advance		
69	Fedele Spatazza	Italy	8.60	8.55	17.15	Did not advance		
73	Maurizio Milanetto	Italy	8.30	8.80	17.10	Did not advance		
74	Emilio Sagre	Cuba	8.45	8.60	17.05	Did not advance		
75	Christian Deuza	France	8.10	8.90	17.00	Did not advance		
75	Drago Sostaric	Yugoslavia	8.40	8.60	17.00	Did not advance		
77	René Badell	Cuba	8.20	8.75	16.95	Did not advance		
77	István Bérczi	Hungary	8.55	8.40	16.95	Did not advance		
77	Bernard Farjat	France	8.30	8.65	16.95	Did not advance		
77	Mircea Gheorghiu	Romania	8.35	8.60	16.95	Did not advance		
77	Constantin Petrescu	Romania	8.30	8.65	16.95	Did not advance		
77	Jorge Rodriguez	Cuba	8.50	8.45	16.95	Did not advance		
83	Tore Lie	Norway	8.25	8.65	16.90	Did not advance		
83	Geno Radev	Bulgaria	8.40	8.50	16.90	Did not advance		
85	John Crosby Jr.	United States	7.85	9.00	16.85	Did not advance		
85	Christian Guiffroy	France	8.10	8.75	16.85	Did not advance		
85	Carmine Luppino	Italy	8.00	8.85	16.85	Did not advance		
88	Luigi Coppa	Italy	8.25	8.55	16.80	Did not advance		
88	Milenko Kersnic	Yugoslavia	8.05	8.75	16.80	Did not advance		
90	Zoran Ivanovic	Yugoslavia	8.15	8.60	16.75	Did not advance		
90	Bill Norgrave	Great Britain	8.55	8.20	16.75	Did not advance		
92	Béla Herczeg	Hungary	8.50	8.20	16.70	Did not advance		
92	Bozhidar Iliev	Bulgaria	8.85	7.85	16.70	Did not advance		
94	Robert Bretscher	Switzerland	7.50	9.10	16.60	Did not advance		
94	Franco Donega	Italy	7.95	8.65	16.60	Did not advance		
96	Eddie Arnold	Great Britain	8.50	8.00	16.50	Did not advance		
97	André Simard	Canada	7.70	8.75	16.45	Did not advance		
98	Peter Lloyd	Australia	8.15	8.10	16.25	Did not advance		
98	Agustin Sandoval	Spain	8.00	8.25	16.25	Did not advance		
100	Roberto Léon Richards	Cuba	7.75	8.45	16.20	Did not advance		
101	Luis Ramirez	Cuba	7.55	8.60	16.15	Did not advance		
102	Ian Clarke	Australia	8.15	7.90	16.05	Did not advance		
102	Georges Guelzec	France	7.45	8.60	16.05	Did not advance		
104	Bruno Banzer	Liechtenstein	7.45	8.55	16.00	Did not advance		
104	Steve Mitruk	Canada	7.75	8.25	16.00	Did not advance		
106	José Ginés	Spain	7.55	8.30	15.85	Did not advance		
106	Stan Wild	Great Britain	8.00	7.85	15.85	Did not advance		
108	Rogelio Mendoza	Mexico	6.90	8.35	15.25	Did not advance		
109	Ole Benediktson	Denmark	6.90	8.25	15.15	Did not advance		
110	Terry Sale	New Zealand	6.60	7.35	13.95	Did not advance		
111	Miloslav Netusil	Czechoslovakia	9.05	0.00	9.05	Did not advance		
—	Hans Ettlin	Switzerland	DNS			Did not advance		
—	Bruce Medd	Canada	DNS			Did not advance		
