= Gymnastics at the 1972 Summer Olympics – Men's artistic individual all-around =

Olympic gymnastics event

Men's artistic individual all-around at the Games of the XX Olympiad
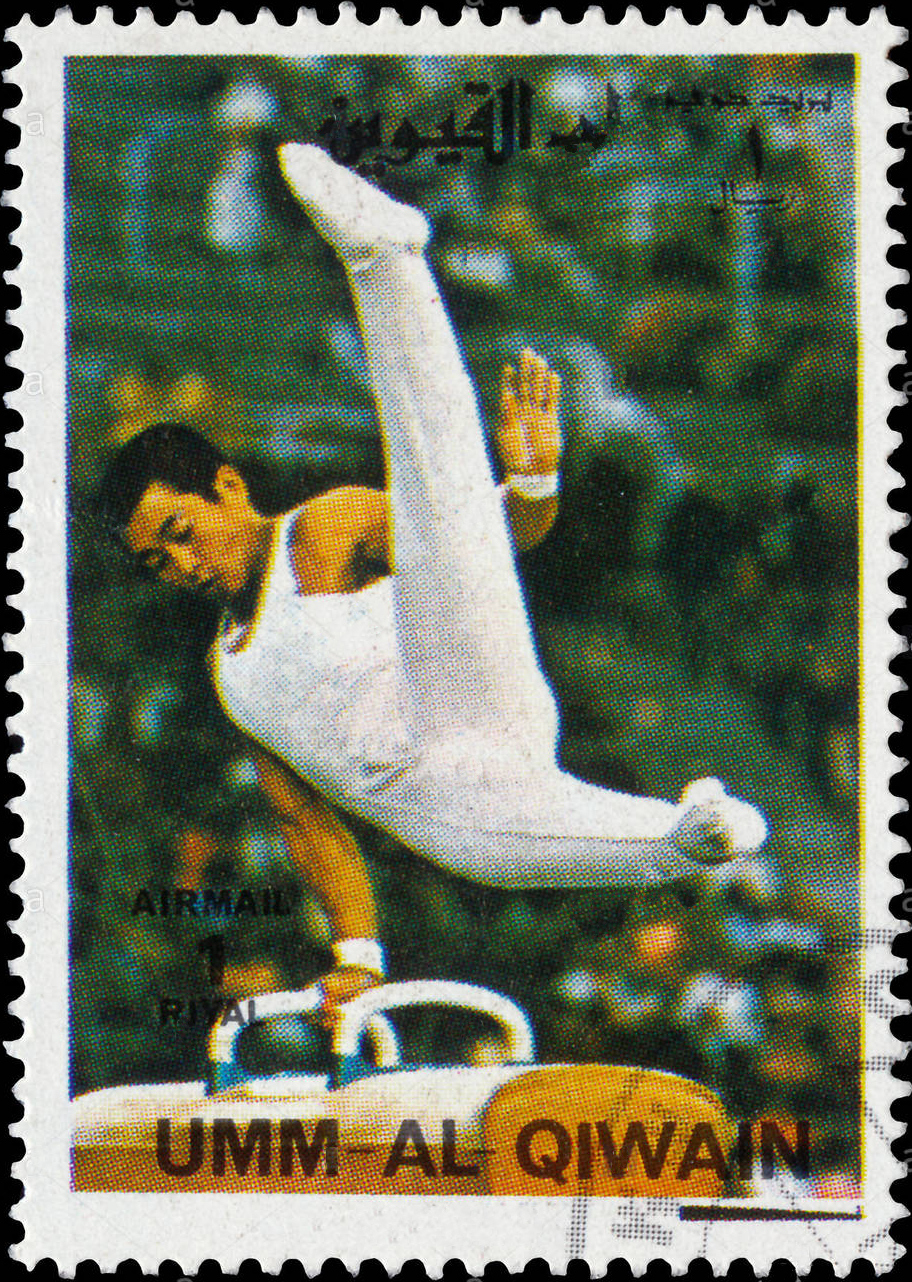
- Umm al-Quwain stamp depicting gold medalist Sawao Kato on the pommel horse
- Venue: Olympiahalle
- Dates: 27–30 August 1972
- Competitors: 113 from 26 nations
- Winning score: 114.650

Medalists
1st place, gold medalist(s)		Sawao Kato; Japan
2nd place, silver medalist(s)		Eizo Kenmotsu; Japan
3rd place, bronze medalist(s)		Akinori Nakayama; Japan

The men's individual all-around competition was one of eight events for male competitors in artistic gymnastics at the 1972 Summer Olympics in Munich. The qualification and final rounds took place on 27, 29 and 30 August at the Sports Hall. There were 113 competitors from 26 nations. Each nation could send a team of 6 gymnasts or up to 3 individual gymnasts. The event was won by Sawao Kato of Japan, the third man to successfully defend an Olympic title in the event; it was Japan's third consecutive victory in the event (matching the Soviet Union for second-most at that point after Italy's four). The Japanese gymnasts swept the medals, with Eizo Kenmotsu earning silver and Akinori Nakayama. Kato and Nakayama, who had also taken bronze in 1968, were the eighth and ninth men to win multiple medals overall in the event. It was the first medal sweep in the event since France did it in the first edition in 1900. This broke the Soviet Union's five-Games medal streak, with their best gymnast (Nikolai Andrianov) finishing fourth.

== Background ==
This was the 16th appearance of the men's individual all-around. The first individual all-around competition had been held in 1900, after the 1896 competitions featured only individual apparatus events. A men's individual all-around has been held every Games since 1900.

Five of the top 10 gymnasts from the 1968 Games returned: gold medalist Sawao Kato of Japan, silver medalist Mikhail Voronin of the Soviet Union, bronze medalist Akinori Nakayama of Japan, fourth-place finisher Eizo Kenmotsu of Japan, and seventh-place finisher Viktor Klimenko of the Soviet Union. Kenmotsu was the reigning (1970) World Champion, with teammates Mitsuo Tsukahara and Nakayama finishing second and third.

Liechtenstein, New Zealand, and North Korea each made their debut in the event. France and Italy both made their 14th appearance, tied for most among nations.

== Competition format ==
All entrants in the gymnastics competitions performed both a compulsory exercise and a voluntary exercise for each apparatus. The scores for all 12 exercises were summed to give an individual all-around preliminary score. (One gymnast who entered the all-around competition did not perform on the vault.) Half of the scores from the preliminary carried over to the final, with the top 36 gymnasts advancing to the individual all-around final. There, each of the finalists performed another exercise on each apparatus. The sum of these scores plus half of the preliminary score resulted in a final total.

Each exercise was scored from 0 to 10; thus, the preliminary apparatus scores ranged from 0 to 20 each and the total preliminary score from 0 to 120. With half of the preliminary score and six more exercises scored 0 to 10, the final total was also from 0 to 120.

The preliminary exercise scores were also used for qualification for the apparatus finals. The two exercises (compulsory and voluntary) for each apparatus were summed to give an apparatus score; the top 6 in each apparatus participated in the finals; others were ranked 7th through 111th.

== Schedule ==
All times are Central European Time (UTC+1)

Date	Time	Round
Sunday, 27 August 1972	11:15; 19:00	Preliminary: Compulsory
Tuesday, 29 August 1972	10:00; 18:00	Preliminary: Voluntary
Wednesday, 30 August 1972	20:00	Final

== Results ==
One-hundred thirteen gymnasts competed in the compulsory and optional rounds on 27 and 29 August. The thirty-six highest scoring gymnasts advanced to the final on 30 August. There was no limit as to how many competitors each country could have in the final. Half of the points earned by each gymnast during both the compulsory and optional rounds carried over to the final. This constitutes each gymnast's "prelim" score.

Rank	Gymnast	Nation	Prelim	1/2 Prelim	Floor	Pommel horse	Rings	Vault	Parallel bars	Horizontal bar	Final	Total
1st place, gold medalist(s)	Sawao Kato	Japan	115.10	57.550	9.250	9.400	9.600	9.500	9.600	9.750	57.100	114.650
2nd place, silver medalist(s)	Eizo Kenmotsu	Japan	114.75	57.375	9.450	9.600	9.500	9.600	9.450	9.600	57.200	114.575
3rd place, bronze medalist(s)	Akinori Nakayama	Japan	114.25	57.125	9.500	9.400	9.550	9.450	9.650	9.650	57.200	114.325
4	Nikolai Andrianov	Soviet Union	113.80	56.900	9.450	9.550	9.550	9.750	9.400	9.650	57.300	114.200
5	Shigeru Kasamatsu	Japan	114.40	57.200	9.500	9.550	9.500	9.250	9.200	9.500	56.500	113.700
6	Viktor Klimenko	Soviet Union	112.65	56.325	9.450	9.350	9.350	9.400	9.650	9.550	56.750	113.075
6	Klaus Köste	East Germany	113.25	56.625	9.350	9.150	9.350	9.400	9.600	9.600	56.450	113.075
8	Mitsuo Tsukahara	Japan	112.25	56.125	9.300	9.200	9.700	9.400	9.200	9.850	56.650	112.775
9	Wolfgang Thüne	East Germany	112.15	56.075	9.000	9.400	9.400	9.400	9.400	9.500	56.100	112.175
10	Matthias Brehme	East Germany	112.45	56.225	9.050	9.350	9.350	9.200	9.500	9.450	55.900	112.125
11	Teruichi Okamura	Japan	111.20	55.600	9.000	9.250	9.450	9.600	9.550	9.600	56.450	112.050
12	Mikhail Voronin	Soviet Union	112.95	56.475	8.800	9.400	9.550	9.000	8.900	9.400	55.050	111.525
13	Li Song-sob	North Korea	110.75	55.375	9.450	8.900	9.350	9.400	9.400	9.500	56.000	111.375
14	Eberhard Gienger	West Germany	109.75	54.875	9.200	9.350	9.450	9.350	9.350	9.600	56.300	111.175
15	Andrzej Szajna	Poland	111.15	55.575	9.250	8.750	9.000	9.500	9.350	9.550	55.400	110.975
16	Vladimir Schukin	Soviet Union	110.20	55.100	9.150	9.050	9.300	9.450	9.200	9.550	55.700	110.800
17	Wolfgang Klotz	East Germany	111.05	55.525	9.200	9.000	9.200	9.050	9.300	9.500	55.250	110.775
18	Alexander Maleev	Soviet Union	110.70	55.350	9.050	9.150	9.300	9.150	9.250	9.400	55.300	110.650
19	Imre Molnár	Hungary	110.55	55.275	9.050	9.350	8.850	9.350	9.400	9.350	55.350	110.625
20	Wilhelm Kubica	Poland	109.90	54.950	9.100	9.450	9.350	9.000	9.400	9.300	55.600	110.550
21	Edvard Mikaelian	Soviet Union	112.50	56.250	9.200	8.300	9.250	9.000	9.000	9.550	54.300	110.550
22	Sylwester Kubica	Poland	110.75	55.375	9.150	9.300	9.250	9.400	8.400	9.450	54.950	110.325
23	Peter Rohner	Switzerland	109.40	54.700	9.200	9.100	8.950	9.500	9.200	9.400	55.350	110.050
24	Walter Mossinger	West Germany	109.70	54.850	9.100	8.800	9.400	8.950	9.300	9.600	55.150	110.000
25	Günter Spies	West Germany	108.70	54.350	9.050	9.200	9.350	9.100	9.200	9.500	55.400	109.750
26	Reinhard Rychly	East Germany	109.95	54.975	9.100	9.000	8.850	9.250	9.150	9.350	54.700	109.675
27	Kim Song-il	North Korea	108.25	54.125	9.100	9.200	9.200	9.200	9.300	9.350	55.350	109.475
28	Jürgen Paeke	East Germany	109.35	54.675	9.150	9.200	8.400	9.250	9.350	9.400	54.750	109.425
29	Zoltán Magyar	Hungary	108.70	54.350	8.850	9.500	9.000	9.100	9.200	9.200	54.850	109.200
30	Kim Song-yu	North Korea	109.45	54.725	8.900	8.950	9.450	9.000	9.350	8.750	54.400	109.125
31	Steven Hug	United States	109.45	54.725	9.050	9.300	9.000	9.150	8.250	9.400	54.150	108.875
32	Danuţ Grecu	Romania	108.10	54.050	9.100	9.100	9.200	9.200	9.200	9.000	54.800	108.850
33	Janez Brodnik	Yugoslavia	107.80	53.900	8.900	9.000	9.100	9.200	9.300	9.450	54.950	108.850
34	Petre Mihăiuc	Romania	109.30	54.650	9.150	8.550	9.150	8.850	9.050	9.250	54.000	108.650
35	Mauno Nissinen	Finland	107.85	53.925	8.950	8.800	9.200	8.950	9.400	9.300	54.600	108.525
36	Jifi Fejtek	Czechoslovakia	107.95	53.975	8.700	9.250	9.150	9.050	9.050	9.300	54.500	108.475
37	Mikołaj Kubica	Poland	111.25	Did not start								
38	Bernd Effing	West Germany	107.75	Did not advance								
38	Shin Heung-do	North Korea	107.75	Did not advance								
40	Ladislav Morava	Czechoslovakia	107.55	Did not advance								
41	Vladislav Nehasil	Czechoslovakia	107.45	Did not advance								
42	Gheorghe Păunescu	Romania	107.25	Did not advance								
43	Robert Bretscher	Switzerland	107.00	Did not advance								
44	Reinhard Ritter	West Germany	106.80	Did not advance								
44	Miloš Vratič	Yugoslavia	106.80	Did not advance								
46	István Kiss	Hungary	106.65	Did not advance								
47	Milenko Kersnić	Yugoslavia	106.60	Did not advance								
48	Mieczysław Strzałka	Poland	106.45	Did not advance								
48	Ho Yun-hang	North Korea	106.45	Did not advance								
50	Jerzy Kruża	Poland	106.35	Did not advance								
50	Marshall Avener	United States	106.35	Did not advance								
52	Heinz Häussler	West Germany	106.25	Did not advance								
52	Pavel Stanovský	Czechoslovakia	106.25	Did not advance								
54	Jo Jong-ryol	North Korea	106.15	Did not advance								
55	Edwin Greutmann	Switzerland	105.90	Did not advance								
56	Makoto Sakamoto	United States	105.70	Did not advance								
57	Béla Herczeg	Hungary	105.60	Did not advance								
57	Stefan Zoev	Bulgaria	105.60	Did not advance								
59	Max Brühwiler	Switzerland	105.40	Did not advance								
59	Jean-Pierre Miens	France	105.40	Did not advance								
61	Jorge Cuervo	Cuba	105.35	Did not advance								
62	Antal Kisteleki	Hungary	105.30	Did not advance								
63	Mircea Gheorghiu	Romania	105.00	Did not advance								
64	István Bérczi	Hungary	104.95	Did not advance								
65	Christian Guiffroy	France	104.90	Did not advance								
66	Philippe Gaille	Switzerland	104.80	Did not advance								
67	Nicolae Oprescu	Romania	104.60	Did not advance								
68	Jorge Rodríguez	Cuba	104.25	Did not advance								
69	Roberto Léon Richards	Cuba	104.20	Did not advance								
70	Geno Radev	Bulgaria	104.05	Did not advance								
71	Zoran Ivanović	Yugoslavia	103.85	Did not advance								
72	Christian Deuza	France	103.75	Did not advance								
72	Jim Culhane Jr.	United States	103.75	Did not advance								
74	Constantin Petrescu	Romania	103.70	Did not advance								
75	Franco Donegà	Italy	103.60	Did not advance								
76	Henri Boërio	France	103.45	Did not advance								
77	Bohumil Mudřík	Czechoslovakia	103.30	Did not advance								
77	John Crosby Jr.	United States	103.30	Did not advance								
79	Ivica Hmjelovac	Yugoslavia	103.10	Did not advance								
80	René Badell	Cuba	103.05	Did not advance								
81	Tore Lie	Norway	102.60	Did not advance								
82	Bernard Farjat	France	102.50	Did not advance								
83	Dimitar Koychev	Bulgaria	102.20	Did not advance								
83	George Greenfield	United States	102.20	Did not advance								
85	Luigi Coppa	Italy	102.05	Did not advance								
86	Drago Šoštarić	Yugoslavia	101.90	Did not advance								
87	Maurizio Milanetto	Italy	101.55	Did not advance								
88	Bruno Banzer	Liechtenstein	101.35	Did not advance								
89	Cecilio Ugarte	Spain	101.15	Did not advance								
90	Ivan Kondev	Bulgaria	100.90	Did not advance								
91	Agustín Sandoval	Spain	100.85	Did not advance								
92	Peter Lloyd	Australia	100.70	Did not advance								
93	Stan Wild	Great Britain	100.55	Did not advance								
94	Emilio Sagre	Cuba	100.40	Did not advance								
95	Georges Guelzec	France	100.20	Did not advance								
96	José Ginés	Spain	99.35	Did not advance								
97	Bozhidar Iliev	Bulgaria	99.30	Did not advance								
97	Steve Mitruk	Canada	99.30	Did not advance								
99	Carmine Luppino	Italy	99.15	Did not advance								
100	Dimitar Dimitrov	Bulgaria	98.95	Did not advance								
101	Adolfo Lampronti	Italy	98.65	Did not advance								
102	Ole Benediktson	Denmark	98.50	Did not advance								
103	Eddie Arnold	Great Britain	97.45	Did not advance								
104	André Simard	Canada	97.30	Did not advance								
105	Luis Ramírez	Cuba	97.25	Did not advance								
106	Rogelio Mendoza	Mexico	97.05	Did not advance								
107	Bill Norgrave	Great Britain	96.90	Did not advance								
108	Fedele Spatazza	Italy	95.85	Did not advance								
109	Ian Clarke	Australia	94.35	Did not advance								
110	Terry Sale	New Zealand	92.05	Did not advance								
111	Miloslav Netušil	Czechoslovakia	54.50	Did not advance								
112	Bruce Medd	Canada	16.95	Did not advance								
113	Hans Ettlin	Switzerland	11.05	Did not advance								
