= Gymnastics at the 1972 Summer Olympics – Men's horizontal bar =

Men's horizontal bar at the Games of the XX Olympiad
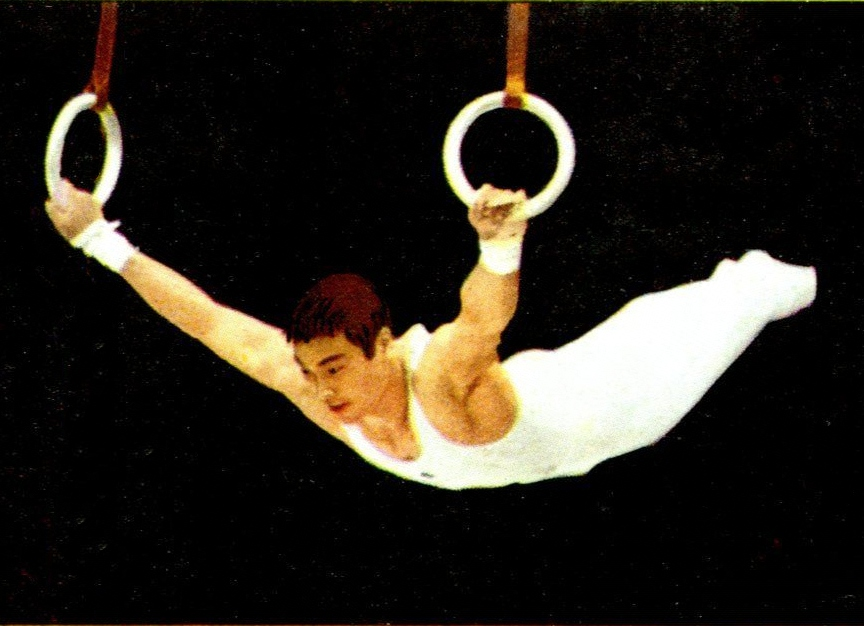
- Mitsuo Tsukahara (on the rings)
- Venue: Olympiahalle
- Dates: 27 August – 1 September 1972
- Competitors: 113 from 26 nations
- Winning score: 19.725

Medalists
| 1st place, gold medalist(s) | | Mitsuo Tsukahara; Japan |
| 2nd place, silver medalist(s) | | Sawao Kato; Japan |
| 3rd place, bronze medalist(s) | | Shigeru Kasamatsu; Japan |

The men's horizontal bar competition was one of eight events for male competitors in artistic gymnastics at the 1972 Summer Olympics in Munich. The qualification and final rounds took place on August 27, 29 and September 1 at the Olympiahalle. There were 113 competitors from 26 nations; nations entering the team event had 6 gymnasts while other nations could have up to 3 gymnasts. Japan reached the height of its success in the event this year, thoroughly dominating the event by taking the top five places (with the final Japanese gymnast placing 10th). Mitsuo Tsukahara was the winner, with Sawao Kato second and Shigeru Kasamatsu third. Japan had now won the event in four of the last five Games. The only finalist from outside Japan was Nikolai Andrianov of the Soviet Union.

== Background ==
This was the 13th appearance of the event, which is one of the five apparatus events held every time there were apparatus events at the Summer Olympics (no apparatus events were held in 1900, 1908, 1912, or 1920). Four of the six finalists from 1968 returned: joint gold medalists Mikhail Voronin of the Soviet Union and Akinori Nakayama of Japan, bronze medalist Eizo Kenmotsu of Japan, and fourth-place finisher Klaus Köste of East Germany. Kenmotsu was the reigning (1970) world champion, with Nakayama the runner-up and Köste tied with Takuji Hayata of Japan (who was not on the Munich Olympic team).

Liechtenstein, New Zealand, and North Korea each made their debut in the men's horizontal bar. The United States made its 12th appearance, most of any nation, having missed only the inaugural 1896 Games.

== Competition format ==
Each nation entered a team of six gymnasts or up to three individual gymnasts. All entrants in the gymnastics competitions performed both a compulsory exercise and a voluntary exercise for each apparatus. The scores for all 12 exercises were summed to give an individual all-around score. (One gymnast who entered the all-around competition did not perform on the vault.) These exercise scores were also used for qualification for the apparatus finals. The two exercises (compulsory and voluntary) for each apparatus were summed to give an apparatus score; the top 6 in each apparatus participated in the finals; others were ranked 7th through 113th. Half of the scores from the preliminary carried over to the final.

== Schedule ==
All times are Central European Time (UTC+1)

| Date | Time | Round |
|---|---|---|
| Monday, 27 August 1972 | 11:15; 19:00 | Preliminary: Compulsory |
| Wednesday, 29 August 1972 | 10:00; 18:00 | Preliminary: Voluntary |
| Saturday, 1 September 1972 | 19:30 | Final |

== Results ==
One-hundred thirteen gymnasts competed in the compulsory and optional rounds on August 27 and 29. The six highest scoring gymnasts advanced to the final on September 1.

| Rank | Gymnast | Nation | Preliminary | | | Final | | |
| Rank | Gymnast | Nation | Compulsory | Voluntary | Total | 1/2 Prelim. | Final | Total |
|---|---|---|---|---|---|---|---|---|
| 1st place, gold medalist(s) | Mitsuo Tsukahara | Japan | 9.75 | 9.90 | 19.65 | 9.825 | 9.900 | 19.725 |
| 2nd place, silver medalist(s) | Sawao Kato | Japan | 9.85 | 9.70 | 19.55 | 9.775 | 9.750 | 19.525 |
| 3rd place, bronze medalist(s) | Shigeru Kasamatsu | Japan | 9.75 | 9.75 | 19.50 | 9.750 | 9.700 | 19.450 |
| 4 | Eizo Kenmotsu | Japan | 9.65 | 9.75 | 19.40 | 9.700 | 9.650 | 19.350 |
| 5 | Akinori Nakayama | Japan | 9.65 | 9.60 | 19.25 | 9.625 | 9.600 | 19.225 |
| 6 | Nikolai Andrianov | Soviet Union | 9.60 | 9.60 | 19.20 | 9.600 | 9.500 | 19.100 |
| 7 | Wolfgang Thüne | East Germany | 9.50 | 9.65 | 19.15 | Did not advance | | |
| 8 | Eberhard Gienger | West Germany | 9.40 | 9.65 | 19.05 | Did not advance | | |
| 8 | Edvard Mikaelian | Soviet Union | 9.45 | 9.60 | 19.05 | Did not advance | | |
| 10 | Matthias Brehme | East Germany | 9.30 | 9.55 | 18.85 | Did not advance | | |
| 10 | Teruichi Okamura | Japan | 9.40 | 9.45 | 18.85 | Did not advance | | |
| 10 | Vladimir Schukin | Soviet Union | 9.35 | 9.50 | 18.85 | Did not advance | | |
| 10 | Mikhail Voronin | Soviet Union | 9.35 | 9.50 | 18.85 | Did not advance | | |
| 14 | Li Song-sob | North Korea | 9.30 | 9.50 | 18.80 | Did not advance | | |
| 15 | Klaus Köste | East Germany | 9.20 | 9.55 | 18.75 | Did not advance | | |
| 15 | Reinhard Rychly | East Germany | 9.30 | 9.45 | 18.75 | Did not advance | | |
| 15 | Andrzej Szajna | Poland | 9.15 | 9.60 | 18.75 | Did not advance | | |
| 18 | Günter Spies | West Germany | 9.25 | 9.40 | 18.65 | Did not advance | | |
| 19 | Alexander Maleev | Soviet Union | 9.20 | 9.35 | 18.55 | Did not advance | | |
| 20 | Wolfgang Klotz | East Germany | 9.05 | 9.45 | 18.50 | Did not advance | | |
| 21 | Henri Boërio | France | 9.05 | 9.40 | 18.45 | Did not advance | | |
| 21 | Robert Bretscher | Switzerland | 9.15 | 9.30 | 18.45 | Did not advance | | |
| 21 | Steven Hug | United States | 9.15 | 9.30 | 18.45 | Did not advance | | |
| 21 | Kim Song-il | North Korea | 9.10 | 9.35 | 18.45 | Did not advance | | |
| 21 | Jürgen Paeke | East Germany | 9.10 | 9.35 | 18.45 | Did not advance | | |
| 26 | Kim Song-yu | North Korea | 9.00 | 9.40 | 18.40 | Did not advance | | |
| 26 | Viktor Klimenko | Soviet Union | 9.15 | 9.25 | 18.40 | Did not advance | | |
| 26 | Mikolaj Kubica | Poland | 8.95 | 9.45 | 18.40 | Did not advance | | |
| 26 | Constantin Petrescu | Romania | 9.00 | 9.40 | 18.40 | Did not advance | | |
| 30 | Janez Brodnik | Yugoslavia | 9.05 | 9.30 | 18.35 | Did not advance | | |
| 31 | Walter Mossinger | West Germany | 8.90 | 9.35 | 18.25 | Did not advance | | |
| 32 | Christian Guiffroy | France | 8.90 | 9.30 | 18.20 | Did not advance | | |
| 32 | Imre Molnár | Hungary | 8.90 | 9.30 | 18.20 | Did not advance | | |
| 32 | Peter Rohner | Switzerland | 8.85 | 9.35 | 18.20 | Did not advance | | |
| 35 | George Greenfield | United States | 8.80 | 9.35 | 18.15 | Did not advance | | |
| 35 | Zoltán Magyar | Hungary | 8.85 | 9.30 | 18.15 | Did not advance | | |
| 35 | Petre Mihaiuc | Romania | 8.90 | 9.25 | 18.15 | Did not advance | | |
| 38 | Ladislav Morava | Czechoslovakia | 8.65 | 9.45 | 18.10 | Did not advance | | |
| 39 | Miloš Vratič | Yugoslavia | 8.80 | 9.25 | 18.05 | Did not advance | | |
| 39 | Makoto Sakamoto | United States | 9.20 | 8.85 | 18.05 | Did not advance | | |
| 41 | Heinz Häussler | West Germany | 8.90 | 9.10 | 18.00 | Did not advance | | |
| 42 | Roberto Léon Richards | Cuba | 8.60 | 9.35 | 17.95 | Did not advance | | |
| 42 | Jorge Rodriguez | Cuba | 8.70 | 9.25 | 17.95 | Did not advance | | |
| 42 | Pavel Stanovsky | Czechoslovakia | 8.75 | 9.20 | 17.95 | Did not advance | | |
| 45 | Edwin Greutmann | Switzerland | 8.75 | 9.15 | 17.90 | Did not advance | | |
| 45 | Mauno Nissinen | Finland | 8.80 | 9.10 | 17.90 | Did not advance | | |
| 45 | Mieczyslaw Strzalka | Poland | 8.65 | 9.25 | 17.90 | Did not advance | | |
| 48 | Wilhelm Kubica | Poland | 8.45 | 9.40 | 17.85 | Did not advance | | |
| 49 | Jerzy Kruza | Poland | 8.55 | 9.25 | 17.80 | Did not advance | | |
| 50 | Philippe Gaille | Switzerland | 8.85 | 8.90 | 17.75 | Did not advance | | |
| 50 | Milenko Kersnic | Yugoslavia | 8.60 | 9.15 | 17.75 | Did not advance | | |
| 50 | Sylwester Kubica | Poland | 8.25 | 9.50 | 17.75 | Did not advance | | |
| 50 | Jean-Pierre Miens | France | 8.55 | 9.20 | 17.75 | Did not advance | | |
| 50 | Vladislav Nehasil | Czechoslovakia | 8.50 | 9.25 | 17.75 | Did not advance | | |
| 50 | Shin Heung-do | North Korea | 8.70 | 9.05 | 17.75 | Did not advance | | |
| 56 | Franco Donega | Italy | 8.55 | 9.15 | 17.70 | Did not advance | | |
| 56 | Bernd Effing | West Germany | 9.05 | 8.65 | 17.70 | Did not advance | | |
| 56 | Dan Grecu | Romania | 8.90 | 8.80 | 17.70 | Did not advance | | |
| 56 | István Kiss | Hungary | 8.70 | 9.00 | 17.70 | Did not advance | | |
| 60 | René Badell | Cuba | 8.55 | 9.05 | 17.60 | Did not advance | | |
| 60 | Luigi Coppa | Italy | 8.65 | 8.95 | 17.60 | Did not advance | | |
| 60 | Christian Deuza | France | 8.80 | 8.80 | 17.60 | Did not advance | | |
| 60 | Jo Jong-ryol | North Korea | 8.70 | 8.90 | 17.60 | Did not advance | | |
| 60 | Nicolae Oprescu | Romania | 8.55 | 9.05 | 17.60 | Did not advance | | |
| 60 | Gheorghe Paunescu | Romania | 8.65 | 8.95 | 17.60 | Did not advance | | |
| 60 | Geno Radev | Bulgaria | 8.60 | 9.00 | 17.60 | Did not advance | | |
| 67 | Bruno Banzer | Liechtenstein | 8.50 | 9.05 | 17.55 | Did not advance | | |
| 67 | Béla Herczeg | Hungary | 8.70 | 8.85 | 17.55 | Did not advance | | |
| 67 | Stefan Zoev | Bulgaria | 8.45 | 9.10 | 17.55 | Did not advance | | |
| 70 | Emilio Sagre | Cuba | 8.55 | 8.90 | 17.45 | Did not advance | | |
| 71 | Ho Yun-hang | North Korea | 8.25 | 9.15 | 17.40 | Did not advance | | |
| 72 | Antal Kisteleki | Hungary | 8.80 | 8.50 | 17.30 | Did not advance | | |
| 73 | Dimitar Koychev | Bulgaria | 8.40 | 8.85 | 17.25 | Did not advance | | |
| 73 | Drago Sostaric | Yugoslavia | 8.45 | 8.80 | 17.25 | Did not advance | | |
| 75 | Max Brühwiler | Switzerland | 8.55 | 8.65 | 17.20 | Did not advance | | |
| 75 | Jorge Cuervo | Cuba | 7.70 | 9.50 | 17.20 | Did not advance | | |
| 75 | Agustin Sandoval | Spain | 8.70 | 8.50 | 17.20 | Did not advance | | |
| 78 | Ivica Hmjelovac | Yugoslavia | 8.30 | 8.85 | 17.15 | Did not advance | | |
| 78 | Bozhidar Iliev | Bulgaria | 8.25 | 8.90 | 17.15 | Did not advance | | |
| 78 | Zoran Ivanovic | Yugoslavia | 8.40 | 8.75 | 17.15 | Did not advance | | |
| 81 | Mircea Gheorghiu | Romania | 8.00 | 9.10 | 17.10 | Did not advance | | |
| 82 | Marshall Avener | United States | 8.15 | 8.90 | 17.05 | Did not advance | | |
| 82 | Jifi Fejtek | Czechoslovakia | 7.85 | 9.20 | 17.05 | Did not advance | | |
| 84 | István Bérczi | Hungary | 8.55 | 8.45 | 17.00 | Did not advance | | |
| 85 | Peter Lloyd | Australia | 8.20 | 8.70 | 16.90 | Did not advance | | |
| 86 | Dimitar Dimitrov | Bulgaria | 8.00 | 8.75 | 16.75 | Did not advance | | |
| 86 | Bernard Farjat | France | 8.05 | 8.70 | 16.75 | Did not advance | | |
| 88 | Steve Mitruk | Canada | 8.10 | 8.50 | 16.60 | Did not advance | | |
| 89 | Jim Culhane Jr. | United States | 8.25 | 8.30 | 16.55 | Did not advance | | |
| 89 | Maurizio Milanetto | Italy | 8.70 | 7.85 | 16.55 | Did not advance | | |
| 91 | Georges Guelzec | France | 8.05 | 8.45 | 16.50 | Did not advance | | |
| 91 | Reinhard Ritter | West Germany | 8.70 | 7.80 | 16.50 | Did not advance | | |
| 93 | Luis Ramirez | Cuba | 7.80 | 8.55 | 16.35 | Did not advance | | |
| 94 | Tore Lie | Norway | 7.65 | 8.65 | 16.30 | Did not advance | | |
| 95 | Stan Wild | Great Britain | 7.60 | 8.50 | 16.10 | Did not advance | | |
| 96 | Adolfo Lampronti | Italy | 7.80 | 8.25 | 16.05 | Did not advance | | |
| 97 | André Simard | Canada | 7.70 | 8.25 | 15.95 | Did not advance | | |
| 98 | José Ginés | Spain | 7.25 | 8.55 | 15.80 | Did not advance | | |
| 99 | Ole Benediktson | Denmark | 7.65 | 8.10 | 15.75 | Did not advance | | |
| 99 | Cecilio Ugarte | Spain | 7.30 | 8.45 | 15.75 | Did not advance | | |
| 101 | Rogelio Mendoza | Mexico | 7.60 | 8.10 | 15.70 | Did not advance | | |
| 102 | John Crosby Jr. | United States | 7.00 | 8.55 | 15.55 | Did not advance | | |
| 103 | Fedele Spatazza | Italy | 7.75 | 7.75 | 15.50 | Did not advance | | |
| 104 | Ivan Kondev | Bulgaria | 7.20 | 8.15 | 15.35 | Did not advance | | |
| 105 | Ian Clarke | Australia | 7.10 | 8.20 | 15.30 | Did not advance | | |
| 105 | Bohumil Mudrik | Czechoslovakia | 6.60 | 8.70 | 15.30 | Did not advance | | |
| 107 | Eddie Arnold | Great Britain | 7.65 | 7.60 | 15.25 | Did not advance | | |
| 108 | Carmine Luppino | Italy | 6.35 | 8.80 | 15.15 | Did not advance | | |
| 109 | Bill Norgrave | Great Britain | 6.85 | 8.15 | 15.00 | Did not advance | | |
| 110 | Terry Sale | New Zealand | 6.15 | 8.40 | 14.55 | Did not advance | | |
| 111 | Hans Ettlin | Switzerland | 9.05 | — | 9.05 | Did not advance | | |
| 112 | Miloslav Netusil | Czechoslovakia | 8.70 | — | 8.70 | Did not advance | | |
| 113 | Bruce Medd | Canada | 3.90 | — | 3.90 | Did not advance | | |
