= André Simard =

André Simard may refer to:

- André Simard (politician)
- André Simard (gymnast)
