= Fabrice Guelzec =

French gymnast

- Born: 21 March 1968 (age 58) Nantes, France
- Height: 1.65 m (5 ft 5 in)
- Relatives: Georges Guelzec (father)

Gymnastics career
- Discipline: Men's artistic gymnastics
- Country represented: France
- Club: Nantaise
Medal record
Men's artistic gymnastics
Representing France
Mediterranean Games
Silver medal – second place	1993 Languedoc-Roussillon	Team
Silver medal – second place	1993 Languedoc-Roussillon	Floor
Bronze medal – third place	1993 Languedoc-Roussillon	Rings

Fabrice Guelzec (born 21 March 1968) is a French gymnast. He competed in seven events at the 1992 Summer Olympics. He is the son of Olympic gymnast Georges Guelzec
