= Japan at the 1972 Summer Olympics =

- IOC code: JPN
- NOC: Japanese Olympic Committee

in Munich
- Competitors: 184 (148 men and 36 women) in 21 sports
- Flag bearer: Masatoshi Shinomaki
- Medals Ranked 5th: Gold 13 Silver 8 Bronze 8 Total 29

Summer Olympics appearances (overview)
- 1912; 1920; 1924; 1928; 1932; 1936; 1948; 1952; 1956; 1960; 1964; 1968; 1972; 1976; 1980; 1984; 1988; 1992; 1996; 2000; 2004; 2008; 2012; 2016; 2020; 2024

Japan competed at the 1972 Summer Olympics in Munich, West Germany. 184 competitors, 148 men and 36 women, took part in 113 events in 21 sports.

== Medalists ==
Medal	Name	Sport	Event	Date
Gold	Sawao Kato; Akinori Nakayama; Eizo Kenmotsu; Mitsuo Tsukahara; Shigeru Kasamatsu; Teruichi Okamura	Gymnastics	Men's team all-around	August 29
Gold	Sawao Kato	Gymnastics	Men's individual all-around	August 30
Gold	Nobutaka Taguchi	Swimming	Men's 100 m breaststroke	August 30
Gold	Kiyomi Kato	Wrestling	Men's freestyle flyweight	August 31
Gold	Hideaki Yanagida	Wrestling	Men's freestyle bantamweight	August 31
Gold	Mayumi Aoki	Swimming	Women's 100 m butterfly	September 1
Gold	Mitsuo Tsukahara	Gymnastics	Men's horizontal bar	September 1
Gold	Sawao Kato	Gymnastics	Men's parallel bars	September 1
Gold	Akinori Nakayama	Gymnastics	Men's rings	September 1
Gold	Shinobu Sekine	Judo	Men's middleweight	September 2
Gold	Toyokazu Nomura	Judo	Men's half middleweight	September 3
Gold	Takao Kawaguchi	Judo	Men's lightweight	September 4
Gold	Yoshihide Fukao; Kenji Kimura; Masayuki Minami; Jungo Morita; Yūzo Nakamura; Katsutoshi Nekoda; Tetsuo Nishimoto; Yasuhiro Noguchi; Seiji Oko; Tetsuo Satō; Kenji Shimaoka; Tadayoshi Yokota	Volleyball	Men's tournament	September 9
Silver	Eizo Kenmotsu	Gymnastics	Men's individual all-around	August 30
Silver	Kikuo Wada	Wrestling	Men's freestyle lightweight	August 31
Silver	Akinori Nakayama	Gymnastics	Men's floor	September 1
Silver	Sawao Kato	Gymnastics	Men's horizontal bar	September 1
Silver	Shigeru Kasamatsu	Gymnastics	Men's parallel bars	September 1
Silver	Sawao Kato	Gymnastics	Men's pommel horse	September 1
Silver	Katsumi Matsumura; Takako Iida; Mariko Okamoto; Takako Shirai; Makiko Furukawa; Keiko Hama; Toyoko Iwahara; Sumie Oinuma; Seiko Shimakage; Michiko Shiokawa; Noriko Yamashita; Yaeko Yamazaki	Volleyball	Women's tournament	September 7
Silver	Koichiro Hirayama	Wrestling	Men's Greco-Roman flyweight	September 10
Bronze	Akinori Nakayama	Gymnastics	Men's individual all-around	August 30
Bronze	Motoki Nishimura	Judo	Men's heavyweight	August 31
Bronze	Shigeru Kasamatsu	Gymnastics	Men's floor	September 1
Bronze	Shigeru Kasamatsu	Gymnastics	Men's horizontal bar	September 1
Bronze	Eizo Kenmotsu	Gymnastics	Men's parallel bars	September 1
Bronze	Eizo Kenmotsu	Gymnastics	Men's pommel horse	September 1
Bronze	Mitsuo Tsukahara	Gymnastics	Men's rings	September 1
Bronze	Nobutaka Taguchi	Swimming	Men's 200 m breaststroke	September 2

Medals by sport
Sport	1st place, gold medalist(s)	2nd place, silver medalist(s)	3rd place, bronze medalist(s)	Total
Gymnastics	5	5	6	16
Judo	3	0	1	4
Wrestling	2	2	0	4
Swimming	2	0	1	3
Volleyball	1	1	0	2
Total	13	8	8	29

== Archery ==
In the first modern archery competition at the Olympics, Japan entered three men and one woman. Their highest placing competitor was Yoshiko Akayama, at 17th place in the women's competition.

Men's Individual Competition:

- Hiroshi Kajikawa — 2381 points (→ 19th place)
- Masashi Hibino — 2344 points (→ 29th place)
- Shinji Nakamoto — 2287 points (→ 38th place)

Women's Individual Competition:

- Yoshiko Akayama — 2301 points (→ 17th place)

== Athletics ==
Men's 5000 metres

- Keisuke Sawaki

- Heat — 13:44.8 (→ did not advance)

- Takaharu Koyama

- Heat — 14:12.6 (→ did not advance)

Men's High Jump

- Hidehiko Tomizawa

- Qualifying Round — 2.15m
- Final — 2.05m (→ 19th place)

- Kuniyoshi Sugioka

- Qualification Round — 2.06m (→ did not advance)

== Boxing ==
Men's Light Flyweight (– 48 kg)

- Yoshimitsu Aragaki

- First Round — Lost to Asen Nikolov (BUL), 0:5

== Cycling ==
Three cyclists represented Japan in 1972.

Sprint

- Yoshikazu Cho
- Yaichi Numata

1000m time trial

- Takafumi Matsuda

- Final — 1:10.00 (→ 20th place)

Tandem

- Yaichi Numata and Yoshikazu Cho → 12th place

== Diving ==
Men's 3m Springboard

- Junji Yuasa — 316.95 points (→ 24th place)

Men's 10m Platform

- Junji Yuasa — 276.00 points (→ 19th place)

Women's 3m Springboard

- Taeko Kubo — 236.25 points (→ 24th place)

Women's 10m Platform

- Keiko Otsubo — 168.24 points (→ 23rd place)

== Fencing ==
Five fencers, all men, represented Japan in 1972.

Men's foil

- Hiroshi Nakajima
- Ichiro Serizawa
- Kiyoshi Uehara

Men's team foil

- Shiro Maruyama, Masaya Fukuda, Hiroshi Nakajima, Kiyoshi Uehara, Ichiro Serizawa

== Handball ==
Men's Team Competition

- Preliminary Round

- Lost to Yugoslavia (14-20)
- Lost to Hungary (12-20)
- Defeated United States (20-16)

- Classification Matches

- 9th/12th place: Lost to Norway (17-19)
- 11th/12th place: Defeated Iceland (19-18) → 11th place

== Modern pentathlon ==
Three male pentathletes represented Japan in 1972.

Men's Individual Competition:

- Masaru Sakano — 4627 points (→ 31st place)
- Yuso Makihira — 4583 points (→ 33rd place)
- Akira Kubo — 4371 points (→ 49th place)

Men's Team Competition:

- Sakano, Makihara, and Kubo — 13569 points (13th place)

== Rowing ==
Men's Single Sculls

- Hideo Okamoto

- Heat — 8:20.82
- Repechage — 8:27.36 (→ did not advance)

== Sailing ==
Men's Finn:

- Kazuoki Matsuyama — 176.0 (→ 27th place)

Men's Flying Dutchman:

- Akira Yamamura and Takashi Yamamura — 128.0 (→ 19th place)

== Shooting ==
Six male shooters represented Japan in 1972.

Open

Athlete	Event	Final	
Athlete	Event	Points	Rank
Minoru Ito	50 m rifle, three positions	1124	41
Minoru Ito	50 m rifle, prone	589	59
Takeo Kamachi	25 m rapid fire pistol	580	33
Kanji Kubo	25 m rapid fire pistol	582	30
Takeshi Sugita	50 m rifle, prone	583	82
Shigetoshi Tashiro	50 m pistol	546	22
Yoshihisa Yoshikawa	50 m pistol	545	25

== Volleyball ==
Men's Team Competition

- Preliminary Round (Group B)

- Defeated Romania (3-1)
- Defeated Cuba (3-0)
- Defeated East Germany (3-0)
- Defeated Brazil (3-0)
- Defeated West Germany (3-0)

- Semifinals

- Defeated Bulgaria (3-2)

- Final

- Defeated East Germany (3-1) → Gold Medal

- Team Roster

- Kenji Kimura
- Yoshinide Fukao
- Junko Morita
- Seiji Ohko
- Tadayoshi Yokota
- Katsutoshi Nekoda
- Yasuhiro Noguchi
- Kenji Shimaoka
- Yūzo Nakamura
- Tetsuo Nishimoto
- Massao Minami
- Tetsuo Satō

== Water polo ==
Men's Team Competition

- Preliminary Round (Group C)

- Lost to Spain (4-6)
- Lost to Soviet Union (1-11)
- Lost to Bulgaria (4-7)
- Lost to Italy (5-12) → Did not advance

- Team Roster

- Yukiharu Oshita
- Hirokatsu Kuwayama
- Toshio Takahashi
- Shuzo Yajima
- Hiroshi Hashimoto
- Koji Nakano
- Naoto Minegishi
- Tatsuo Jihira
- Takashi Kimura
- Yoshihiro Yasumi
- Toru Arase

== Badminton (demonstration sports) ==
Men's Doubles:

- Ippei Kojima and Suresh Goel of India

1. 1st round - Lost to Ng. Boon Bee and Punch Gunalan of Malaysia (8 - 15, 1 - 15)

Women's Singles:

- Noriko Nakayama → Gold Medal

1. 1st round - defeated Ulla Strand of Denmark (11 - 5, 11 - 9)
2. Semi–Final - defeated Gillian Gilks of Great Britain (11 - 3, 8 - 11, 11 - 9)
3. Final - defeated Utami Dewi of Indonesia (11 - 5, 11 - 3)

- Hiroe Yuki → bronze medal

1. 1st round - defeated Joke van Beusekom of Netherlands (11 - 3, 11 - 2)
2. Semi-Final - lost to Utami Dewi of Indonesia (5 - 11, 9 - 11)

Mixed Doubles:

- Kojima and Nakayama

1. 1st round - lost to Talbot and Gilks of Great Britain (9 - 15, 4 - 15)
