= Luigi Coppa =

Italian gymnast

- Born: 25 September 1950 (age 75) Turin, Italy
- Height: 1.67 m (5 ft 6 in)

Gymnastics career
- Discipline: Men's artistic gymnastics
- Country represented: Italy
- Club: Reale Società Ginnastica Torino

Luigi Coppa (born 25 September 1950) is an Italian gymnast. He competed in eight events at the 1972 Summer Olympics.
