= Bruno Banzer =

Liechtenstein gymnast (born 1947)

- Born: 17 June 1947 (age 79)
- Height: 1.73 m (5 ft 8 in)

Gymnastics career
- Discipline: Men's artistic gymnastics
- Country represented: Liechtenstein

Bruno Banzer (born 17 June 1947) is a Swiss retired artistic gymnast who competed for Liechtenstein at the 1972 Summer Olympics, becoming the first man to represent Liechtenstein in gymnastics at the Olympic Games. He later became a trained electrician.

== Early life ==
Banzer was born 17 June 1947, and he was acrobatic from a young age; he did his first headstand at two years old, and at five, he performed a handstand at a village wedding instead of performing poems as the other children did.

== Career ==
In 1972, Banzer missed making the Swiss Olympic team by a quarter of a point and decided to compete for Liechtenstein instead, which he said he was just as proud to do. He was the first gymnast to enter the arena for the competition, and he competed in six events in the individual all-around. His best placement was on the pommel horse, where he placed 60th, and he finished in 88th place in the all-around qualifications. He and the other members of the delegation were visited by the reigning Prince and Princess of Liechtenstein, Franz Joseph II and Princess Gina, and their daughter Princess Nora, and the family watched his performance during the optional routines section of the qualification round. To express his gratitude toward Liechtenstein for allowing him to compete, he put on a training course for young gymnasts in Schaan. He is the only male artistic gymnast to have represented Liechtenstein at the Olympic Games.

== Post-gymnastics career ==
After finishing his competitive career, Banzer trained as an electrician and studied physical education and psychology. He visits Liechtenstein on a yearly basis.
