= George Greenfield (gymnast) =

American gymnast (born 1948)

- Full name: George Howard Greenfield
- Born: May 5, 1948 (age 78) Altadena, California, U.S.
- Height: 170 cm (5 ft 7 in)

Gymnastics career
- Discipline: Men's artistic gymnastics
- Country represented: United States
- College team: California Golden Bears

George Howard Greenfield (born May 5, 1948) is an American gymnast. He was a member of the United States men's national artistic gymnastics team and competed in eight events at the 1972 Summer Olympics.

== Personal life ==
Greenfield is a member of the Church of Jesus Christ of Latter-day Saints.
