= Peter Lloyd (gymnast) =

Australian gymnast

- Full name: Peter Clarence Lloyd
- Born: 22 September 1949 (age 76)
- Height: 170 cm (5 ft 7 in)

Gymnastics career
- Discipline: Men's artistic gymnastics
- Country represented: Australia

Peter Clarence Lloyd (born 22 September 1949) is an Australian gymnast. He competed at the 1972 Summer Olympics and the 1976 Summer Olympics.
