= Drago Šoštarić =

Slovenian gymnast (1943–2026)

- Драго Шоштарић
- Born: 30 January 1943 Marburg, Reichsgau Steiermark, Germany (now Maribor, Slovenia)
- Died: 13 April 2026 (aged 83)
- Height: 1.69 m (5 ft 7 in)

Gymnastics career
- Discipline: Men's artistic gymnastics
- Country represented: Yugoslavia

Drago Šoštarić (30 January 1943 – 13 April 2026) was a Slovenian gymnast. He competed in eight events at the 1972 Summer Olympics. Šoštarić died on 13 April 2026, at the age of 83.
