= Georges Guelzec =

French gymnast

- Born: 22 October 1947 (age 78)
- Relatives: Fabrice Guelzec (son)

Gymnastics career
- Discipline: Men's artistic gymnastics
- Country represented: France

President of European Union of Gymnastics
- In office 2010–2017
- Preceded by: Dimitrios Dimitropoulos
- Succeeded by: Farid Gayibov

Georges Guelzec (born 22 October 1947) is a French gymnast. He competed in eight events at the 1972 Summer Olympics. He is the father of Olympic gymnast Fabrice Guelzec and Laurent Guelzec, awarded Coach of the Year by European Gymnastics.

Guelzec was president of the European Union of Gymnastics from 2010 through 2017. He was elected at the 23rd UEG Congress in 2009, replacing Dimitrios Dimitropoulos as president in 2010. In 2013, he was re-elected to a second term, which started in 2014.

He announced his candidacy for president of the International Gymnastics Federation in 2015, but lost to Morinari Watanabe in 2016.
