= Rogelio Mendoza =

Mexican gymnast (born 1944)

- Full name: Rogelio Mendoza Rojas
- Born: 2 May 1944 (age 82) Mexico City, Mexico
- Height: 1.71 m (5 ft 7 in)

Gymnastics career
- Discipline: Men's artistic gymnastics
- Country represented: Mexico

Rogelio Mendoza Rojas (born 2 May 1944) is a Mexican gymnast. He competed at the 1968 Summer Olympics and the 1972 Summer Olympics.
