= Ladislav Morava =

Czech gymnast

- Born: 7 February 1946 (age 80)

Gymnastics career
- Discipline: Men's artistic gymnastics
- Country represented: Czechoslovakia

Ladislav Morava (born 7 February 1946) is a Czech gymnast. He competed in eight events at the 1972 Summer Olympics.
