= Jim Culhane Jr. =

American gymnast

Jim Culhane, Jr.
- Full name: James Patrick Culhane, Jr.
- Born: August 13, 1942 (age 84) Rochester, New York, U.S.
- Height: 170 cm (5 ft 7 in)

Gymnastics career
- Discipline: Men's artistic gymnastics
- Country represented: United States
- College team: Penn State Nittany Lions
- Gym: New York Athletic Club

James Patrick Culhane, Jr. (born August 13, 1942) is an American gymnast. He was a member of the United States men's national artistic gymnastics team and competed in eight events at the 1972 Summer Olympics.
