= Dimitar Koychev =

Bulgarian gymnast (born 1953)

- Димитър Койчев
- Born: 27 March 1953 (age 73)

Gymnastics career
- Discipline: Men's artistic gymnastics
- Country represented: Bulgaria

Dimitar Koychev (Bulgarian: Димитър Койчев) (born 27 March 1953) is a Bulgarian gymnast. He competed at the 1972 Summer Olympics and the 1976 Summer Olympics.
