= Robert Bretscher =

Swiss gymnast (born 1953)

- Born: 6 August 1953 (age 73) Winterthur, Switzerland
- Height: 1.74 m (5 ft 9 in)

Gymnastics career
- Discipline: Men's artistic gymnastics
- Country represented: Switzerland
- Gym: Turnverein Wülflingen

Robert Bretscher (born 6 August 1953) is a Swiss gymnast. He competed at the 1972 Summer Olympics and the 1976 Summer Olympics.
