= Carmine Luppino =

Italian gymnast

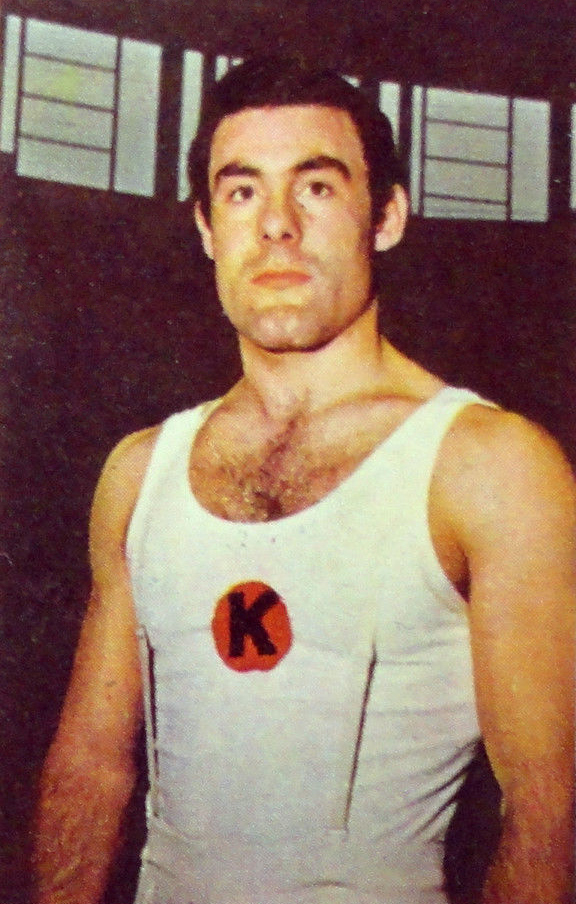

Personal information
- Born: 10 January 1948 (age 78) Seminara, Italy
- Height: 1.72 m (5 ft 8 in)

Gymnastics career
- Discipline: Men's artistic gymnastics
- Country represented: Italy
- Gym: Società Sportiva Kines

Carmine Luppino (born 10 January 1948) is a retired Italian gymnast. He competed at the 1972 Olympics in all artistic gymnastics events and finished in 16th place with the Italian team. His best individual result was 60th place on the parallel bars.
