= Bruce Medd =

Canadian gymnast (born 1953)

- Born: 30 June 1953 (age 73) Ottawa, Ontario, Canada

Gymnastics career
- Discipline: Men's artistic gymnastics
- Country represented: Canada

Bruce Medd (born 30 June 1953) is a Canadian gymnast. He competed in four events at the 1972 Summer Olympics.
