= Günter Spies =

German gymnast

- Born: 22 January 1948 (age 78) Kenzingen, Allied-occupied Germany
- Height: 1.69 m (5 ft 7 in)

Gymnastics career
- Discipline: Men's artistic gymnastics
- Country represented: West Germany
- Gym: Turnerbund Emmendingen 1844

Günter Spies (born 22 January 1948) is a German gymnast. He competed in eight events at the 1972 Summer Olympics.
