= Adolfo Lampronti =

Italian gymnast

- Born: 5 June 1949 (age 77) Ferrara, Italy
- Height: 1.73 m (5 ft 8 in)

Gymnastics career
- Discipline: Men's artistic gymnastics
- Country represented: Italy
- Club: Gruppo Sportivo Vigili del Fuoco "Giancarlo Brunetti" Roma

Adolfo Lampronti (born 5 June 1949) is an Italian gymnast. He competed in eight events at the 1972 Summer Olympics.
