= Philippe Gaille =

Swiss gymnast

- Born: 8 October 1951 (age 74)
- Height: 1.68 m (5 ft 6 in)

Gymnastics career
- Discipline: Men's artistic gymnastics
- Country represented: Switzerland
- Gym: Lausanne-Bourgeoise

Philippe Gaille (born 8 October 1951) is a Swiss gymnast. He competed at the 1972 Summer Olympics and the 1976 Summer Olympics.
