= Franco Donegà =

Italian gymnast

- Born: 13 September 1952 (age 73) Genoa, Italy
- Height: 1.73 m (5 ft 8 in)

Gymnastics career
- Discipline: Men's artistic gymnastics
- Country represented: Italy
- Gym: Società Ginnastica Raffaele Rubattino

Franco Donegà (born 13 September 1952) is an Italian gymnast. He competed in eight events at the 1972 Summer Olympics.
