= René Badell =

Cuban gymnast (born 1948)

- Full name: René Badell Pollar
- Born: 15 April 1948 (age 78)

Gymnastics career
- Discipline: Men's artistic gymnastics
- Country represented: Cuba

René Badell Pollar (born 15 April 1948) is a Cuban gymnast. He competed in eight events at the 1972 Summer Olympics.
