= Gheorghe Păunescu =

Romanian gymnast

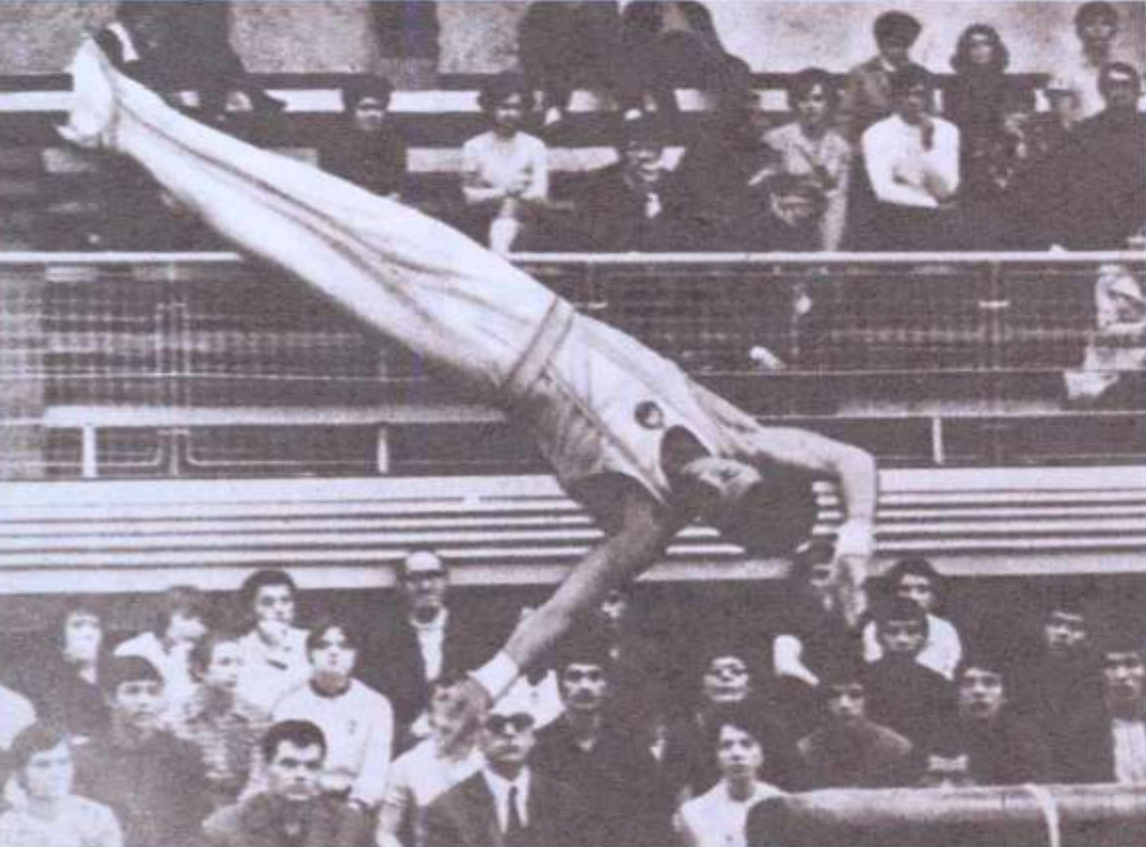

Personal information
- Born: 29 January 1948 (age 78) Craiova, Romanian People's Republic
- Height: 1.77 m (5 ft 10 in)

Gymnastics career
- Discipline: Men's artistic gymnastics
- Country represented: Romania
- Club: CS Dinamo București

Gheorghe Păunescu (born 20 January 1948) is a Romanian gymnast. He competed in eight events at the 1972 Summer Olympics.
