= Li Song-sob =

North Korean gymnast

- Born: 4 June 1953 (age 73)
- Height: 1.58 m (5 ft 2 in)

Gymnastics career
- Discipline: Men's artistic gymnastics
- Country represented: North Korea

Li Song-sob (born 4 June 1953) is a North Korean gymnast. He competed in eight events at the 1972 Summer Olympics.
