= Antal Kisteleki =

Hungarian gymnast

- Born: 16 January 1945 (age 81) Székesfehérvár, Hungary
- Height: 1.67 m (5 ft 6 in)

Gymnastics career
- Discipline: Men's artistic gymnastics
- Country represented: Hungary
- Club: Újpesti Tornaegylet

Antal Kisteleki (born 16 January 1945) is a Hungarian gymnast. He competed in eight events at the 1972 Summer Olympics.
