= Miloš Vratič =

Slovenian gymnast (born 1948)

- Милош Вратич
- Born: 11 May 1948 (age 78) Ljubljana, Federal People's Republic of Yugoslavia
- Height: 1.73 m (5 ft 8 in)

Gymnastics career
- Discipline: Men's artistic gymnastics
- Country represented: Yugoslavia

Miloš Vratič (born 11 May 1948) is a Slovenian gymnast. He competed at the 1968 Summer Olympics and the 1972 Summer Olympics.
