= Ivica Hmjelovac =

Croatian gymnast (born 1946)

- Ивица Хмјеловац
- Born: 2 May 1946 (age 80) Slavonski Brod, Yugoslavia

Gymnastics career
- Discipline: Men's artistic gymnastics
- Country represented: (Socialist Federal Republic of Yugoslavia) Yugoslavia

Ivica Hmjelovac (born 2 May 1946) is a Croatian gymnast. He competed in eight events at the 1972 Summer Olympics.
