= István Kiss (gymnast) =

Hungarian gymnast (1948–2025)

- Full name: István B. Kiss
- Born: 19 December 1948 Budapest, Hungary
- Died: September 2025 (aged 76)
- Height: 1.68 m (5 ft 6 in)

Gymnastics career
- Discipline: Men's artistic gymnastics
- Country represented: Hungary
- Club: Budapesti Vasas Sport Club

István B. Kiss (19 December 1948 – September 2025) was a Hungarian gymnast. He competed in eight events at the 1972 Summer Olympics.

Kiss died in September 2025, at the age of 76.
