= Mieczysław Strzałka =

Polish gymnast (1947–2024)

- Full name: Mieczysław Józef Strzałka
- Born: 20 March 1947 Bielsko-Biała, Polish People's Republic
- Died: 13 August 2024 (aged 77)
- Height: 1.74 m (5 ft 9 in)

Gymnastics career
- Discipline: Men's artistic gymnastics
- Country represented: Poland
- Club: Start Bielsko

Mieczysław Józef Strzałka (20 March 1947 – 13 August 2024) was a Polish gymnast. He competed in eight events at the 1972 Summer Olympics. Strzałka died on 13 August 2024, at the age of 77.
