= Mircea Gheorghiu =

Romanian gymnast

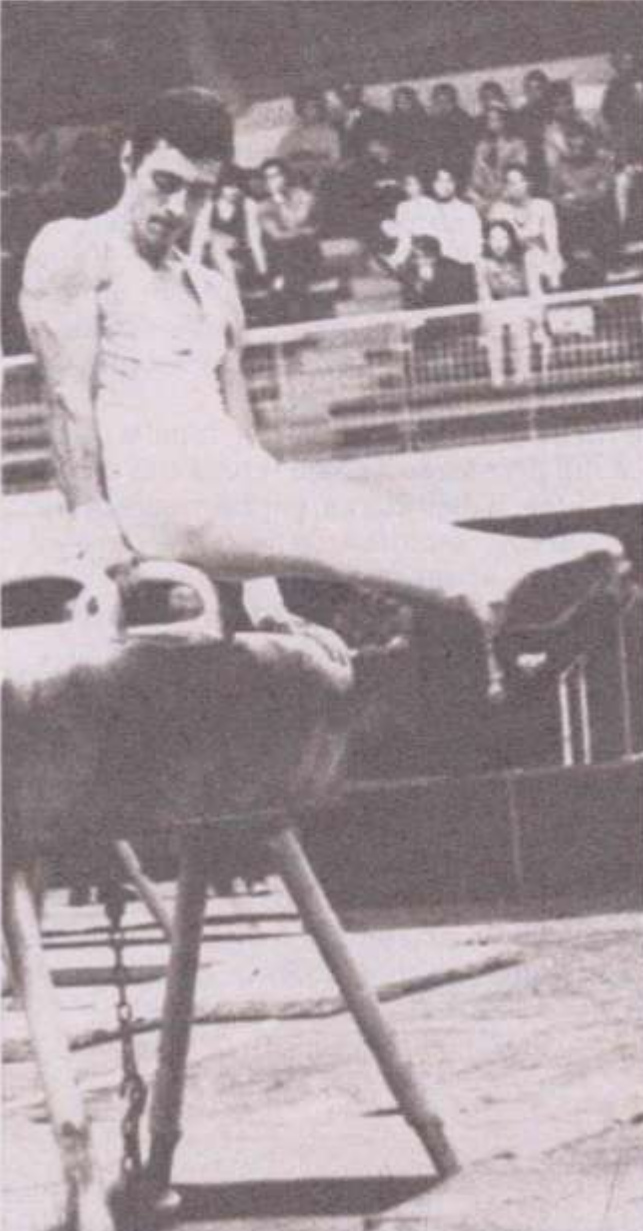
- Born: 8 August 1948 (age 78) Bucharest, Romanian People's Republic
- Height: 1.75 m (5 ft 9 in)

Gymnastics career
- Discipline: Men's artistic gymnastics
- Country represented: Romania
- Club: CS Dinamo București

Mircea Gheorghiu (born 8 August 1948) is a Romanian gymnast. He competed in eight events at the 1972 Summer Olympics.
