= Aleksandr Maleyev =

Soviet artistic gymnast (1947–2023)

- Александр Иванович Малеев
- Full name: Aleksandr Ivanovich Maleyev
- Born: 7 July 1947 Voronezh, Russian SFSR, Soviet Union
- Died: 3 June 2023 (aged 75)
- Height: 1.68 m (5 ft 6 in)

Gymnastics career
- Discipline: Men's artistic gymnastics
- Country represented: Soviet Union
- Club: Sportivny Klub Vooruzhyonny Sily Minsk
Medal record
Men's artistic gymnastics
Representing Soviet Union
Olympic Games
Silver medal – second place	1972 Munich	Team

Aleksandr Ivanovich Maleyev (Russian: Александр Иванович Малеев; 7 July 1947 – 3 June 2023) was a Soviet artistic gymnast. He competed at the 1972 Summer Olympics in all artistic gymnastics events and won a silver medal in the team allround competition. Individually, his best achievement was 14th place on the floor.

Maleyev was born in Voronezh, Russia, but since 1970 lived in Minsk, Belarus. He won a national title in 1971. Maleyev died on 3 June 2023, at the age of 75.
