= Jean-Pierre Miens =

French gymnast

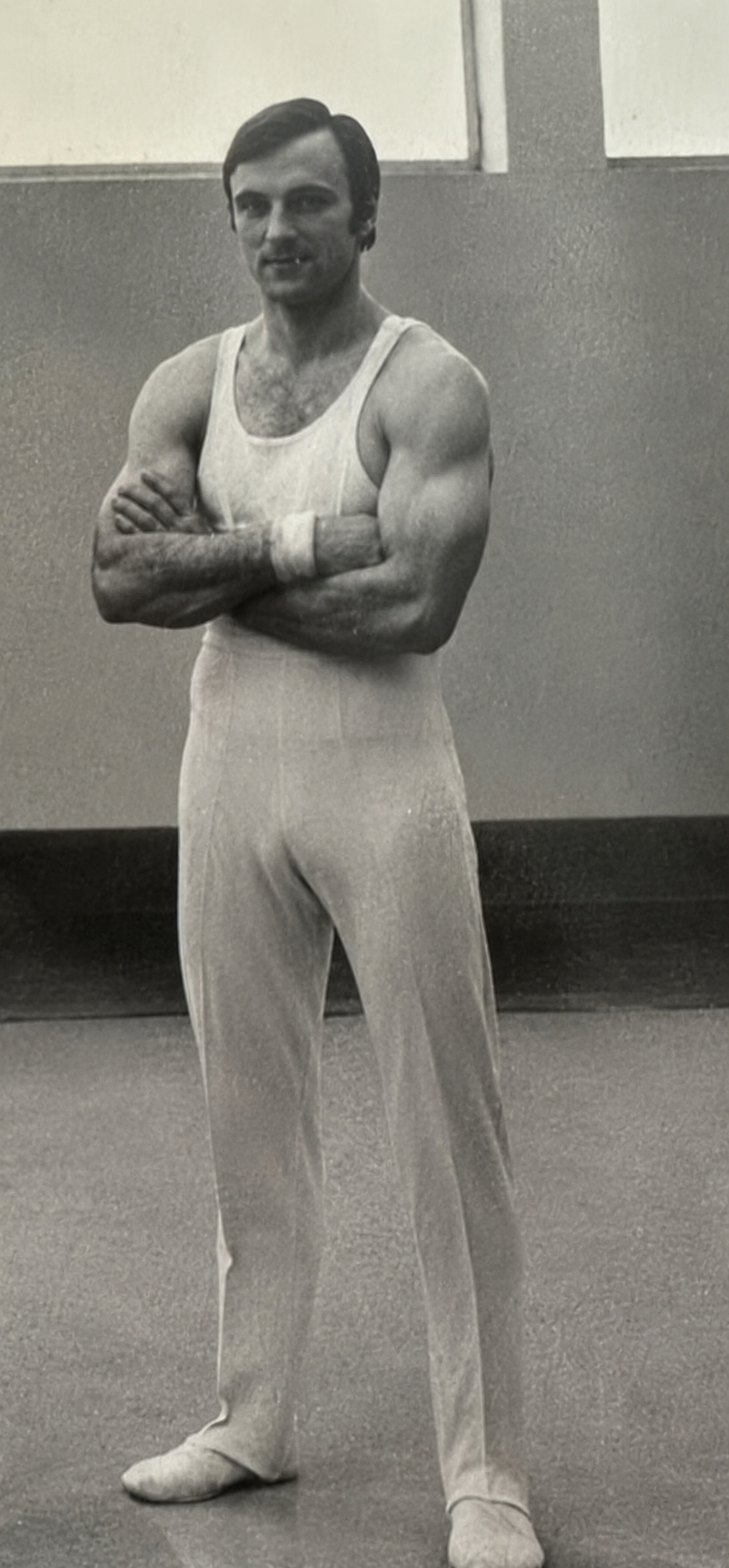
- Born: 1 November 1949 (age 76)

Gymnastics career
- Discipline: Men's artistic gymnastics
- Country represented: France

Jean-Pierre Miens (born 1 November 1949) is a French gymnast. He competed in eight events at the 1972 Summer Olympics.
