= Jo Jong-ryol =

North Korean gymnast (born 1940)

- Born: 1 February 1940 (age 86)
- Height: 1.62 m (5 ft 4 in)

Gymnastics career
- Discipline: Men's artistic gymnastics
- Country represented: North Korea

Jo Jong-ryol (Korean: 조정렬; born 1 February 1940) is a North Korean gymnast. He competed in eight events at the 1972 Summer Olympics.
