= Kim Song-yu =

North Korean gymnast (born 1948)

- Born: 7 November 1948 (age 77)
- Height: 1.62 m (5 ft 4 in)

Gymnastics career
- Discipline: Men's artistic gymnastics
- Country represented: North Korea

Kim Song-yu (born 7 November 1948) is a North Korean gymnast. He competed in eight events at the 1972 Summer Olympics.
