= Reinhard Ritter =

German gymnast

- Born: 24 September 1948 (age 78) Haßloch, French occupation zone in Germany
- Height: 1.63 m (5 ft 4 in)

Gymnastics career
- Discipline: Men's artistic gymnastics
- Country represented: West Germany
- Gym: Turnerbund 1889 Oppau

Reinhard Ritter (born 24 September 1948) is a German gymnast. He competed at the 1972 Summer Olympics and the 1976 Summer Olympics.
