= Geno Radev =

Bulgarian gymnast (born 1946)

- Гено Радев
- Born: 15 April 1946 (age 80) Balchik, Bulgaria

Gymnastics career
- Discipline: Men's artistic gymnastics
- Country represented: Bulgaria

Geno Radev (Bulgarian: Гено Радев) (born 15 April 1946) is a Bulgarian gymnast. He competed in eight events at the 1972 Summer Olympics.
