= István Bérczi =

Hungarian gymnast (1945–2021)

- Full name: István Ferenc Bérczi
- Born: 1 July 1945 Nagycenk, Hungary
- Died: 10 April 2021 (aged 75) Budapest, Hungary
- Height: 1.72 m (5 ft 8 in)

Gymnastics career
- Discipline: Men's artistic gymnastics
- Country represented: Hungary
- Club: Budapesti Spartacus Sport Club

István Ferenc Bérczi (1 July 1945 – 9 April 2021) was a Hungarian artistic gymnast. He competed in eight events at the 1972 Summer Olympics.
