= Dimitar Dimitrov (gymnast) =

Bulgarian gymnast (1946–2024)

- Димитър Димитров
- Born: 11 March 1946 Kardam, Dobrich Province, Kingdom of Bulgaria
- Died: February 2024 (aged 77)

Gymnastics career
- Discipline: Men's artistic gymnastics
- Country represented: Bulgaria

Dimitar Dimitrov (Bulgarian: Димитър Димитров; 11 March 1946 – February 2024) was a Bulgarian gymnast. He competed in eight events at the 1972 Summer Olympics.

Dimitrov died in February 2024, at the age of 77.
