= Petre Mihăiuc =

Romanian gymnast

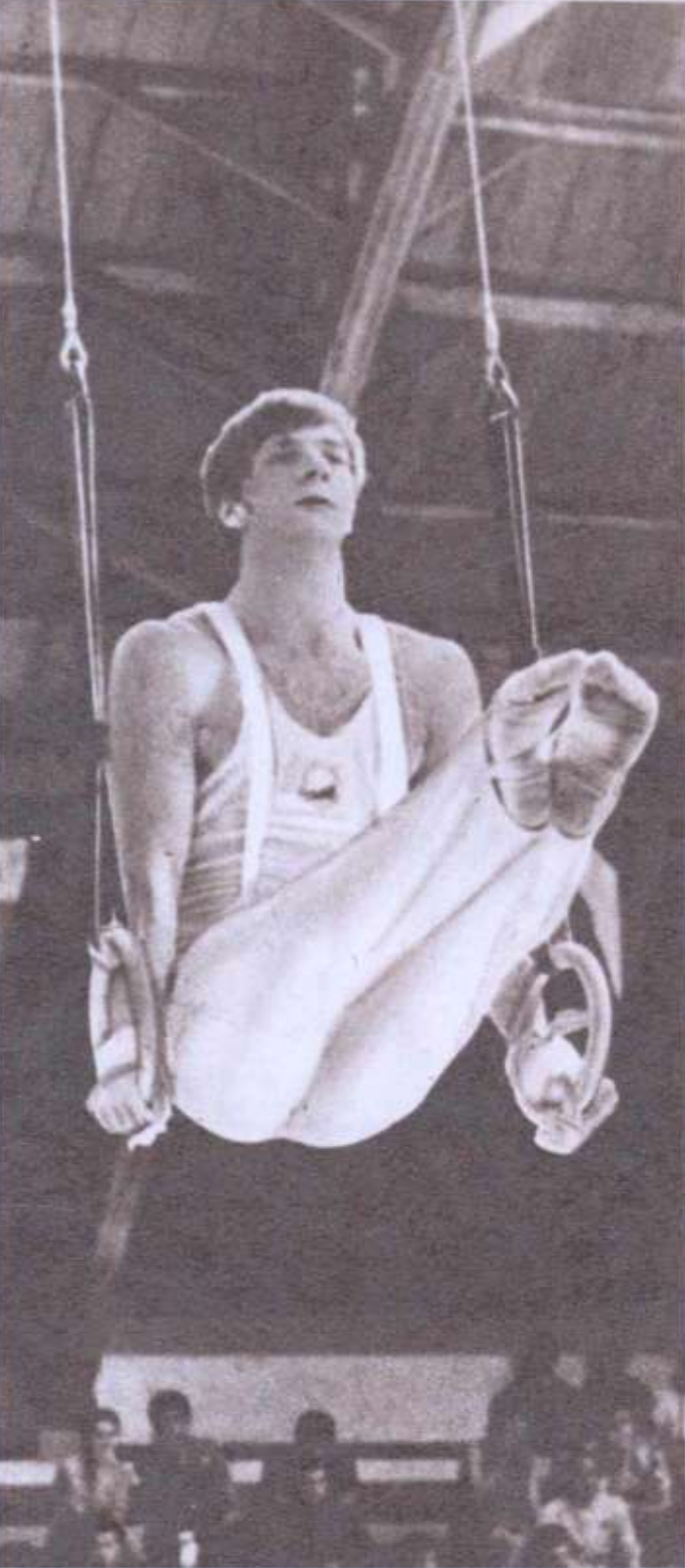

Personal information
- Born: 5 July 1948 (age 78) Bucharest, Romanian People's Republic

Gymnastics career
- Discipline: Men's artistic gymnastics
- Country represented: Romania
- Club: CSA Steaua București

Petre Mihăiuc (born 5 July 1948) is a Romanian gymnast. He competed in eight events at the 1972 Summer Olympics.
