= Béla Herczeg =

Hungarian gymnast

- Born: 13 June 1947 (age 79) Debrecen, Hungary
- Height: 1.69 m (5 ft 7 in)

Gymnastics career
- Discipline: Men's artistic gymnastics
- Country represented: Hungary
- Club: Budapesti Vörös Meteor Sport Klub

Béla Herczeg (born 13 June 1947) is a Hungarian gymnast. He competed at the 1968 Summer Olympics and the 1972 Summer Olympics.
