= Bill Norgrave =

British gymnast (born 1947)

- Full name: William Norgrave
- Born: 15 April 1947 (age 79)

Gymnastics career
- Discipline: Men's artistic gymnastics
- Country represented: (United Kingdom) Great Britain

William Norgrave (born 15 April 1947) is a British gymnast. He competed in seven events at the 1972 Summer Olympics.
