= Vladimir Shchukin =

Soviet artistic gymnast

- Владимир Борисович Щукин
- Full name: Vladimir Borisovich Shchukin
- Born: 4 April 1952 (age 74) Minsk, Byelorussian SSR, Soviet Union
- Height: 1.68 m (5 ft 6 in)

Gymnastics career
- Discipline: Men's artistic gymnastics
- Country represented: Soviet Union
- Club: Sportivny Klub Vooruzhyonny Sily Minsk
Medal record
Men's artistic gymnastics
Representing Soviet Union
Olympic Games
| Silver medal – second place | 1972 Munich | Team |

Vladimir Borisovich Shchukin (Russian: Владимир Борисович Щукин; born 4 April 1952) is a retired Soviet artistic gymnast. He competed at the 1972 Summer Olympics in all artistic gymnastics events and won a silver medal in the team allround competition. Individually, his best achievement was 10th place on the horizontal bar.
