= Max Brühwiler =

Swiss gymnast

- Born: 8 March 1948 (age 78)
- Height: 1.63 m (5 ft 4 in)

Gymnastics career
- Discipline: Men's artistic gymnastics
- Country represented: Switzerland
- Gym: Turnverein Adliswil

Max Brühwiler (born 8 March 1948) is a Swiss gymnast. He competed in eight events at the 1972 Summer Olympics.
