= Vladislav Nehasil =

Czech gymnast

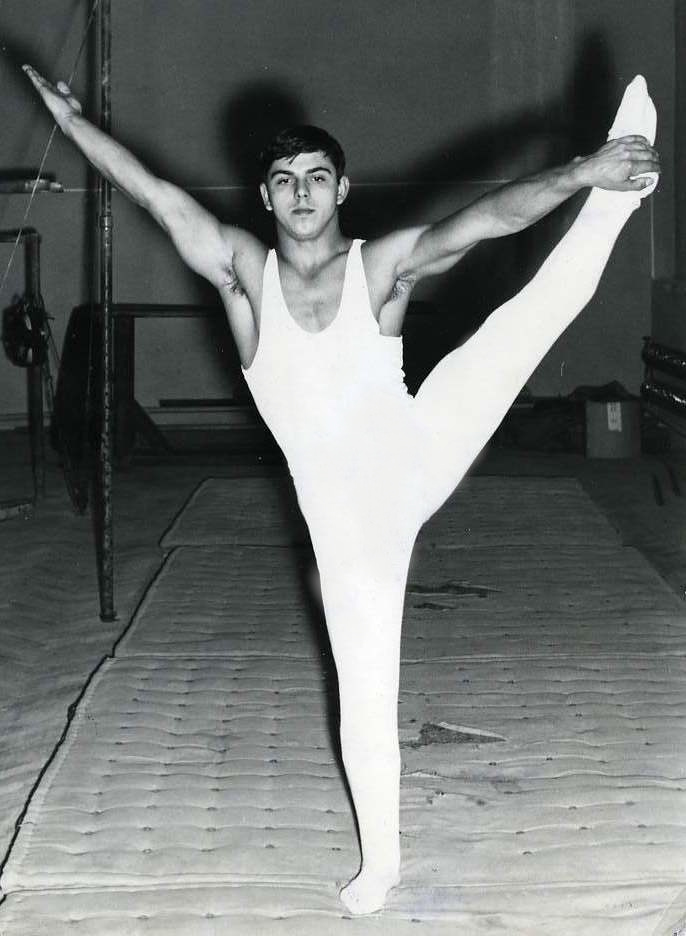
- Nehasil in 1978

Personal information
- Born: 23 March 1947 (age 79) Ústí nad Labem, Czechoslovakia

Gymnastics career
- Discipline: Men's artistic gymnastics
- Country represented: Czechoslovakia

Vladislav Nehasil (born 23 March 1947) is a Czech gymnast. He competed at the 1972 Summer Olympics and the 1976 Summer Olympics.
