= Steve Mitruk =

Canadian gymnast

- Full name: Stephen Mitruk
- Born: 17 January 1947 (age 79) Hamilton, Ontario, Canada

Gymnastics career
- Discipline: Men's artistic gymnastics
- Country represented: Canada

Stephen Mitruk (born 17 January 1947) is a Canadian gymnast. He competed at the 1968 Summer Olympics and the 1972 Summer Olympics.
