= Bernd Effing =

German gymnast

- Born: 26 April 1948 (age 78) Neukirchen, Allied-occupied Germany
- Height: 1.78 m (5 ft 10 in)

Gymnastics career
- Discipline: Men's artistic gymnastics
- Country represented: West Germany

Bernd Effing (born 26 April 1948) is a German gymnast. He competed in eight events at the 1972 Summer Olympics.
