= Fedele Spatazza =

Italian gymnast

- Born: 26 June 1954 (age 72) Tunis, French protectorate of Tunisia
- Height: 1.55 m (5 ft 1 in)

Gymnastics career
- Discipline: Men's artistic gymnastics
- Country represented: Italy
- Club: Gruppo Sportivo Vigili del Fuoco

Fedele Spatazza (born 26 June 1954) is an Italian gymnast. He competed in eight events at the 1972 Summer Olympics.
