= Edwin Greutmann =

Swiss gymnast

- Born: 14 October 1946 (age 79) Beggingen, Switzerland
- Height: 1.66 m (5 ft 5 in)

Gymnastics career
- Discipline: Men's artistic gymnastics
- Country represented: Switzerland
- Gym: Turnverein Regendorf

Edwin Greutmann (born 14 October 1946) is a Swiss gymnast. He competed at the 1968 Summer Olympics and the 1972 Summer Olympics.
