= Tore Lie =

Norwegian gymnast

- Full name: Tore Raaheim Lie
- Born: 3 November 1945 (age 80) Bergen, Norway
- Height: 1.76 m (5 ft 9 in)

Gymnastics career
- Discipline: Men's artistic gymnastics
- Country represented: Norway
- Gym: Bergens TF

Tore Raaheim Lie (born 3 November 1945) is a Norwegian gymnast. He competed in seven events at the 1972 Summer Olympics.
