= Ian Clarke (gymnast) =

Australian gymnast

- Full name: Ian Douglas Clarke
- Born: 20 March 1944 (age 82)
- Height: 172 cm (5 ft 8 in)

Gymnastics career
- Discipline: Men's artistic gymnastics
- Country represented: Australia

Ian Douglas Clarke (born 20 March 1944) is an Australian gymnast. He competed in seven events at the 1972 Summer Olympics.
