= Ole Benediktson =

Danish gymnast

- Born: 19 February 1949 (age 77) Svostrup, Denmark

Gymnastics career
- Discipline: Men's artistic gymnastics
- Country represented: Denmark

Ole Benediktson (born 19 February 1949) is a Danish gymnast. He competed at the 1972 Summer Olympics and the 1976 Summer Olympics.
