= Zoran Ivanović (gymnast) =

Yugoslav gymnast (born 1949)

- Зоран Ивановић
- Born: 27 August 1949 (age 77)
- Height: 1.67 m (5 ft 6 in)

Gymnastics career
- Discipline: Men's artistic gymnastics
- Country represented: Yugoslavia

Zoran Ivanović (born 27 August 1949) is a Yugoslav gymnast. He competed in eight events at the 1972 Summer Olympics.
