= Bernard Farjat =

French gymnast

- Born: 7 September 1945 (age 80)

Gymnastics career
- Discipline: Men's artistic gymnastics
- Country represented: France
- Club: Champigny

Bernard Farjat (born 7 September 1945) is a French gymnast. He competed in eight events at the 1972 Summer Olympics.

== Biography ==
After placing third in the all-around competition at the 1969 French Championships, Bernard Farjat was crowned French champion on the Pommel horse and French runner-up in the individual all-around competition in 1970. At the 1971 French Championships, he won the individual all-around competition and the finals on the pommel horse and the rings.

He competed in the 1972 Summer Olympics in Munich, finishing 13th in the team all-around competition.

He was the runner-up in the 1973 French National Individual All-Around Competition.

He served as president of the Champigny Gymnastics Club from 1976 to 2008.
