= Walter Mössinger =

German gymnast (1949–2024)

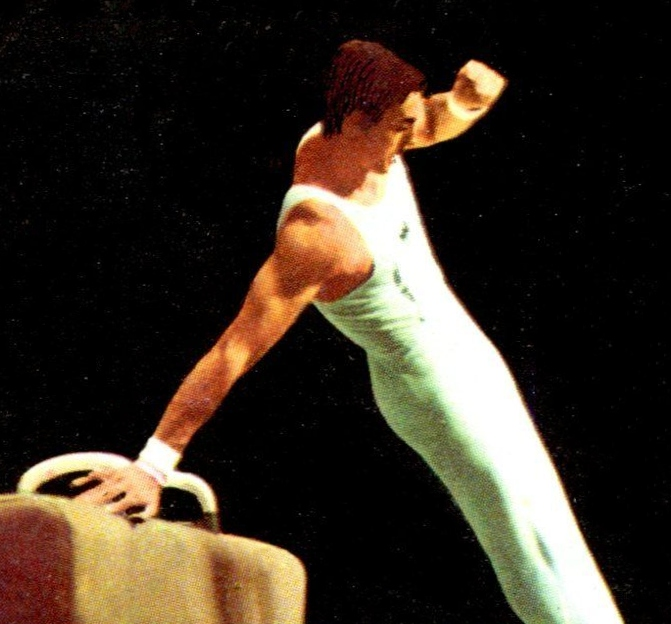
- Mössinger at the 1972 Summer Olympics

Personal information
- Born: 1 March 1949 Emmendingen, Allied-occupied Germany
- Died: 3 March 2024 (aged 75) Teningen, Baden-Württemberg, Germany
- Height: 1.65 m (5 ft 5 in)

Gymnastics career
- Discipline: Men's artistic gymnastics
- Country represented: West Germany
- Gym: Turnerbund Emmendingen 1844

Walter Mössinger (1 March 1949 – 3 March 2024) was a German artistic gymnast. He competed at the 1972 Summer Olympics and 1974 World Artistic Gymnastics Championships and placed fifth with West German teams on both occasions. Mößinger died on 3 March 2024, at the age of 75.
