= Reinhard Rychly =

East German gymnast

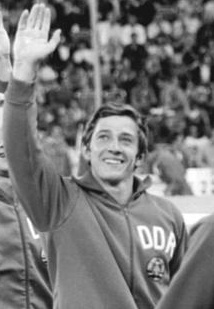
- Rychly in 1972

Personal information
- Born: 7 November 1951 (age 74) Rostock, East Germany
- Height: 1.66 m (5 ft 5 in)

Gymnastics career
- Discipline: Men's artistic gymnastics
- Country represented: East Germany
- Club: Armeesportklub Vorwärts Potsdam
Medal record
Men's artistic gymnastics
Representing East Germany
Olympic Games
Bronze medal – third place	1972 Munich	Team

Reinhard Rychly (born 7 November 1951) is a German former gymnast. He competed at the 1972 Summer Olympics in all artistic gymnastics events and won a bronze medal with the East German team. Individually his best achievement was 15th place on the horizontal bar.
