= Kim Song-il (gymnast) =

North Korean gymnast (born 1946)

- 김성일
- Born: 27 February 1946 (age 80)
- Height: 1.56 m (5 ft 1 in)

Gymnastics career
- Discipline: Men's artistic gymnastics
- Country represented: North Korea

Kim Song-il (born 27 February 1946) is a North Korean gymnast. He competed in eight events at the 1972 Summer Olympics.
