= Terry Sale =

New Zealand gymnast

- Full name: Terence John Sale
- Born: 5 July 1951 (age 75) Auckland, New Zealand
- Height: 1.66 m (5 ft 5 in)

Gymnastics career
- Discipline: Men's artistic gymnastics
- Country represented: New Zealand
- Gym: Leys Institute Gymnastics Club

Terence John Sale (born 5 July 1951) is a New Zealand gymnast. He competed in seven events at the 1972 Summer Olympics.
