= Emilio Sagré =

Cuban gymnast (born 1950)

- Full name: Emilio Sagré del Cristo
- Born: 11 November 1950 (age 75)

Gymnastics career
- Discipline: Men's artistic gymnastics
- Country represented: Cuba

Emilio Sagré del Cristo (born 11 November 1950) is a Cuban gymnast. He competed in eight events at the 1972 Summer Olympics.
