= Ho Yun-hang =

North Korean gymnast

- Born: 20 October 1950 (age 75)
- Height: 1.68 m (5 ft 6 in)

Gymnastics career
- Discipline: Men's artistic gymnastics
- Country represented: North Korea

Ho Yun-hang (born 20 October 1950) is a North Korean gymnast. He competed in eight events at the 1972 Summer Olympics.
