= Hans Ettlin =

Swiss gymnast

- Born: 10 March 1945 (age 81) Kerns, Switzerland
- Height: 1.62 m (5 ft 4 in)

Gymnastics career
- Discipline: Men's artistic gymnastics
- Country represented: Switzerland
- Gym: Turnverein Bern-Berna

Hans Ettlin (born 10 March 1945) is a Swiss gymnast. He competed at the 1968 Summer Olympics and the 1972 Summer Olympics.
