= Bozhidar Iliev =

Bulgarian gymnast (born 1945)

- Божидар Илиев
- Born: 20 December 1945 (age 80) Razgrad, Bulgaria

Gymnastics career
- Discipline: Men's artistic gymnastics
- Country represented: Bulgaria

Bozhidar Iliev (Bulgarian: Божидар Илиев) (born 20 December 1945) is a Bulgarian gymnast. He competed in eight events at the 1972 Summer Olympics.
