= Pavel Stanovský =

Czech gymnast

- Born: 18 April 1948 (age 78)

Gymnastics career
- Discipline: Men's artistic gymnastics
- Country represented: Czechoslovakia

Pavel Stanovský (born 18 April 1948) is a Czech gymnast. He competed in eight events at the 1972 Summer Olympics.
