= André Simard (gymnast) =

Canadian gymnast

- Born: 29 April 1945 Alma, Quebec, Canada
- Died: 1 May 2025 (aged 80)

Gymnastics career
- Discipline: Men's artistic gymnastics
- Country represented: Canada

André Simard (29 April 1945 – 1 May 2025) was a Canadian gymnast. He competed in seven events at the 1972 Summer Olympics. Simard died on 1 May 2025.
