= List of gymnasts at the 1972 Summer Olympics =

This is a list of the gymnasts who represented their country at the 1972 Summer Olympics in Munich from 26 August to 11 September 1972. Only one discipline, artistic gymnastics, was included in the Games.

== Female artistic gymnasts ==
	Name	Country	Date of birth (Age)
Youngest competitor	Krisztina Medveczky	Hungary	14 April 1958 (aged 14)
Oldest competitor	Kayoko Saka	Japan	26 April 1944 (aged 28)

NOC	Name	Date of birth (Age)	Hometown
Australia	Jennifer Sunderland	13 March 1954 (aged 18)	
Bulgaria	Maya Blagoeva	25 July 1956 (aged 16)	Kalenovtsi, Bulgaria
Bulgaria	Elena Georgieva	26 January 1947 (aged 25)	Godech, Bulgaria
Bulgaria	Marieta Ilieva	13 December 1955 (aged 16)	Stara Zagora, Bulgaria
Bulgaria	Irina Khitrova	29 October 1953 (aged 18)	Ivaylovgrad, Bulgaria
Bulgaria	Evdokia Pandezova	31 December 1947 (aged 24)	Plovdiv, Bulgaria
Bulgaria	Reneta Tsvetkova	19 November 1957 (aged 14)	Ruse, Bulgaria
Canada	Lise Arsenault	14 December 1954 (aged 17)	Cartierville, Quebec
Canada	Susan Buchanan	6 January 1952 (aged 20)	Ottawa, Ontario
Canada	Jennifer Diachun	14 August 1953 (aged 19)	Toronto, Ontario
Canada	Nancy McDonnell	26 March 1955 (aged 17)	Toronto, Ontario
Canada	Teresa McDonnell	8 December 1953 (aged 18)	Toronto, Ontario
Canada	Sharon Tsukamoto	10 August 1953 (aged 19)	Toronto, Ontario
Czechoslovakia	Soňa Brázdová	17 February 1953 (aged 19)	Zlín, Czechoslovakia
Czechoslovakia	Zdena Bujnáčková	25 April 1955 (aged 17)	Bratislava, Czechoslovakia
Czechoslovakia	Zdena Dorňáková	25 June 1957 (aged 15)	Valašské Meziříčí, Czechoslovakia
Czechoslovakia	Hana Lišková	4 June 1952 (aged 20)	Prague, Czechoslovakia
Czechoslovakia	Marianna Némethová-Krajčírová	1 June 1948 (aged 24)	Košice, Czechoslovakia
Czechoslovakia	Marcela Váchová	16 June 1953 (aged 19)	Brno, Czechoslovakia
East Germany	Irene Abel	12 February 1953 (aged 19)	Berlin, East Germany
East Germany	Angelika Hellmann	10 April 1954 (aged 18)	Halle, East Germany
East Germany	Karin Janz	17 February 1952 (aged 20)	Lübben, East Germany
East Germany	Richarda Schmeißer	20 August 1954 (aged 18)	Zeitz, East Germany
East Germany	Christine Schmitt	26 May 1953 (aged 19)	Rostock, East Germany
East Germany	Erika Zuchold	19 March 1947 (aged 25)	Lucka, East Germany
France	Nadine Audin	3 April 1958 (aged 14)	Montceau-les-Mines, France
France	Mireille Cayre	2 April 1947 (aged 25)	Moulins, France
France	Catherine Daugé	13 October 1956 (aged 15)	
France	Elvire Gertosio	20 May 1948 (aged 24)	
France	Pascale Hermant	11 May 1957 (aged 15)	
France	Véronique Tilmont	16 May 1955 (aged 17)	
Great Britain	Barbara Alred	31 October 1953 (aged 18)	Bradford, England
Great Britain	Pamela Hopkins	18 September 1953 (aged 18)	Cardiff, Wales
Great Britain	Pamela Hutchinson	7 December 1953 (aged 18)	
Great Britain	Avril Lennox	26 April 1956 (aged 16)	Leicester, England
Great Britain	Yvonne Mugridge	27 April 1953 (aged 19)	Sidcup, England
Great Britain	Elaine Willett	8 January 1956 (aged 16)	Lewisham, England
Hungary	Ilona Békési	11 December 1953 (aged 18)	Budapest, Hungary
Hungary	Mónika Császár	17 November 1954 (aged 17)	Budapest, Hungary
Hungary	Márta Kelemen	17 September 1954 (aged 17)	Budapest, Hungary
Hungary	Anikó Kéry	31 March 1956 (aged 16)	Budapest, Hungary
Hungary	Krisztina Medveczky	14 April 1958 (aged 14)	Budapest, Hungary
Hungary	Zsuzsa Nagy	14 November 1951 (aged 20)	Budapest, Hungary
Italy	Angela Alberti	4 February 1949 (aged 23)	Covo, Italy
Italy	Cinzia Delisi	27 October 1956 (aged 15)	São Paulo, Brazil
Italy	Maria Grazia Mancuso	19 August 1956 (aged 16)	Venice, Italy
Italy	Gabriella Marchi	23 July 1956 (aged 16)	Rimini, Italy
Italy	Rita Peri	22 May 1957 (aged 15)	Novara, Italy
Italy	Monica Stefani	17 November 1957 (aged 14)	Lucca, Italy
Japan	Kazue Hanyu	8 September 1950 (aged 21)	Fukui Prefecture, Japan
Japan	Takako Hasegawa	1 January 1951 (aged 21)	
Japan	Eiko Hirashima	7 October 1950 (aged 21)	
Japan	Miyuki Matsuhisa	15 August 1945 (aged 27)	Kyoto, Japan
Japan	Toshiko Miyamoto	4 January 1954 (aged 18)	
Japan	Kayoko Saka	26 April 1944 (aged 28)	Miyazaki Prefecture, Japan
Mexico	Hilda Amezaga	30 April 1954 (aged 18)	
Mexico	Ana María Casas	24 December 1955 (aged 16)	
Mexico	Patricia García	18 January 1957 (aged 15)	
Mexico	María Antonieta Hernández	25 March 1958 (aged 14)	
Mexico	Patricia Ollinger	9 September 1953 (aged 18)	
Mexico	Laura Rivera	17 October 1954 (aged 17)	Mexico City, Mexico
Netherlands	Ans Dekker	1 March 1955 (aged 17)	Beverwijk, Netherlands
Netherlands	Ikina Morsch	5 July 1956 (aged 16)	Heiloo, Netherlands
Netherlands	Linda Toorop	12 September 1955 (aged 16)	Sorong, Indonesia
Netherlands	Nel van der Voort	11 October 1951 (aged 20)	Amsterdam, Netherlands
Netherlands	Ans van Gerwen	17 January 1951 (aged 21)	Eindhoven, Netherlands
Netherlands	Margo Velema	21 October 1955 (aged 16)	Eindhoven, Netherlands
New Zealand	Diane Foote	1 September 1954 (aged 17)	Dunedin, New Zealand
Norway	Trine Andresen	28 November 1955 (aged 16)	Oslo, Norway
Norway	Sidsel Ekholdt	10 March 1956 (aged 16)	Vestfossen, Norway
Norway	Bente Hansen	22 August 1953 (aged 19)	Oslo, Norway
Norway	Unni Holmen	23 September 1952 (aged 19)	Oslo, Norway
Norway	Gro Sandberg	25 April 1956 (aged 16)	Hokksund, Norway
Norway	Jill Schau	20 August 1948 (aged 24)	Bergen, Norway
Poland	Małgorzata Barlak	7 July 1952 (aged 20)	Katowice, Poland
Poland	Joanna Bartosz	14 February 1954 (aged 18)	Olsztyn, Poland
Poland	Danuta Fidusiewicz	27 July 1952 (aged 20)	Olsztyn, Poland
Poland	Dorota Klencz	19 July 1955 (aged 17)	Zabrze, Poland
Poland	Danuta Lubowska	21 May 1956 (aged 16)	Zabrze, Poland
Poland	Łucja Matraszek	4 May 1954 (aged 18)	Warsaw, Poland
Romania	Elena Ceampelea	3 March 1947 (aged 25)	Ploiești, Romania
Romania	Alina Goreac	28 September 1952 (aged 19)	Lugoj, Romania
Romania	Anca Grigoraș	8 November 1957 (aged 14)	Comănești, Romania
Romania	Paula Ioan	1 April 1955 (aged 17)	Bucharest, Romania
Romania	Marcela Păunescu	11 January 1955 (aged 17)	Craiova, Romania
Romania	Elisabeta Turcu	2 May 1953 (aged 19)	Ploiești, Romania
Soviet Union	Lyubov Burda	11 April 1953 (aged 19)	Voronezh, Russian SFSR
Soviet Union	Olga Korbut	16 May 1955 (aged 17)	Grodno, Byelorussian SSR
Soviet Union	Antonina Koshel	20 November 1954 (aged 17)	Smolevichi, Byelorussian SSR
Soviet Union	Tamara Lazakovich	14 March 1954 (aged 18)	Gusevo, Russian SFSR
Soviet Union	Elvira Saadi	2 January 1952 (aged 20)	Tashkent, Uzbek SSR
Soviet Union	Ludmilla Tourischeva	7 October 1952 (aged 19)	Grozny, Russian SFSR
Spain	Pepita Sánchez	5 May 1952 (aged 20)	Sant Andreu de Llavaneres, Spain
Sweden	Marie Lundqvist-Björk	21 February 1947 (aged 25)	Västerås, Sweden
Switzerland	Patrizia Bazzi	21 August 1957 (aged 15)	Locarno, Switzerland
Switzerland	Käthi Fritschi	18 August 1954 (aged 18)	Lucerne, Switzerland
Switzerland	Liselotte Marti	25 May 1956 (aged 16)	Herisau, Switzerland
Switzerland	Jacqueline Sievert	18 August 1956 (aged 16)	Adliswil, Switzerland
Switzerland	Christine Steger	18 December 1957 (aged 14)	Kriens, Switzerland
Switzerland	Judith Steiger	27 October 1956 (aged 15)	Zürich, Switzerland
United States	Kimberly Chace	4 May 1956 (aged 16)	Manchester, Tennessee
United States	Linda Metheny	12 August 1947 (aged 25)	Olney, Illinois
United States	Joan Moore	14 August 1954 (aged 18)	Philadelphia, Pennsylvania
United States	Roxanne Pierce	14 October 1954 (aged 17)	Springfield, New Jersey
United States	Cathy Rigby	12 December 1952 (aged 19)	Long Beach, California
United States	Nancy Thies	10 June 1957 (aged 15)	Denver, Colorado
West Germany	Angelika Kern	31 August 1952 (aged 19)	Emmendingen, West Germany
West Germany	Andrea Niederheide	2 November 1957 (aged 14)	Hattingen, West Germany
West Germany	Jutta Oltersdorf	17 April 1956 (aged 16)	Köndringen, West Germany
West Germany	Ingrid Santer	9 June 1955 (aged 17)	Munich, West Germany
West Germany	Uta Schorn	7 August 1957 (aged 15)	Cologne, West Germany
West Germany	Ulrike Weyh	1 August 1957 (aged 15)	Itzehoe, West Germany
Yugoslavia	Nataša Bajin-Šljepica	29 September 1945 (aged 26)	Belgrade, Yugoslavia
Yugoslavia	Olga Bumbić	4 September 1946 (aged 25)	
Yugoslavia	Erna Havelka	19 September 1944 (aged 27)	Zagreb, Yugoslavia
Yugoslavia	Slaviča Kundačina	26 April 1955 (aged 17)	
Yugoslavia	Nevenka Puškarević	30 April 1952 (aged 20)	
Yugoslavia	Marija Težak	1 June 1957 (aged 15)	Ljubljana, Yugoslavia

== Male artistic gymnasts ==
	Name	Country	Date of birth (Age)
Youngest competitor	Fedele Spatazza	Italy	26 June 1954 (aged 18)
Oldest competitor	Jo Jong-ryol	North Korea	1 February 1940 (aged 32)

NOC	Name	Date of birth (Age)	Hometown
Australia	Ian Clarke	20 March 1944 (aged 28)	
Australia	Peter Lloyd	22 September 1949 (aged 22)	Melbourne, Victoria
Bulgaria	Dimitar Dimitrov	11 March 1946 (aged 26)	Kardam, Bulgaria
Bulgaria	Bozhidar Iliev	20 December 1945 (aged 26)	Razgrad, Bulgaria
Bulgaria	Ivan Kondev	29 January 1944 (aged 28)	Sliven, Bulgaria
Bulgaria	Dimitar Koychev	27 March 1953 (aged 19)	
Bulgaria	Geno Radev	15 April 1946 (aged 26)	Balchik, Bulgaria
Bulgaria	Stefan Zoev	19 January 1943 (aged 29)	Sofia, Bulgaria
Canada	Bruce Medd	30 June 1953 (aged 19)	Ottawa, Ontario
Canada	Steve Mitruk	17 January 1947 (aged 25)	Hamilton, Ontario
Canada	André Simard	29 April 1945 (aged 27)	Alma, Quebec
Cuba	René Badell	15 April 1948 (aged 24)	
Cuba	Jorge Cuervo	4 May 1950 (aged 22)	
Cuba	Roberto León	12 June 1954 (aged 18)	Cárdenas, Cuba
Cuba	Luis Ramírez	13 January 1948 (aged 24)	Havana, Cuba
Cuba	Jorge Rodríguez	18 April 1948 (aged 24)	Havana, Cuba
Cuba	Emilio Sagré	11 November 1950 (aged 21)	
Czechoslovakia	Jiří Fejtek	22 September 1946 (aged 25)	Prague, Czechoslovakia
Czechoslovakia	Ladislav Morava	7 February 1946 (aged 26)	
Czechoslovakia	Bohumil Mudřík	3 December 1941 (aged 30)	Zlín, Czechoslovakia
Czechoslovakia	Vladislav Nehasil	23 March 1947 (aged 25)	Ústí nad Labem, Czechoslovakia
Czechoslovakia	Miloslav Netušil	20 February 1946 (aged 26)	Chomutov, Czechoslovakia
Czechoslovakia	Pavel Stanovský	18 April 1948 (aged 24)	
Denmark	Ole Benediktson	19 February 1949 (aged 23)	Svostrup, Denmark
East Germany	Matthias Brehme	7 February 1943 (aged 29)	Markkleeberg, East Germany
East Germany	Wolfgang Klotz	4 November 1951 (aged 20)	Torgau, East Germany
East Germany	Klaus Köste	27 February 1943 (aged 29)	Frankfurt an der Oder, East Germany
East Germany	Jürgen Paeke	13 September 1948 (aged 23)	Biesenthal, East Germany
East Germany	Reinhard Rychly	7 November 1951 (aged 20)	Rostock, East Germany
East Germany	Wolfgang Thüne	8 October 1949 (aged 22)	Heilbad Heiligenstadt, East Germany
Finland	Mauno Nissinen	16 August 1947 (aged 25)	Oulu, Finland
France	Henri Boério	13 June 1952 (aged 20)	Sétif, Algeria
France	Christian Deuza	3 January 1944 (aged 28)	Boulogne-sur-Mer, France
France	Bernard Farjat	7 September 1945 (aged 26)	
France	Georges Guelzec	22 October 1947 (aged 24)	
France	Christian Guiffroy	21 January 1941 (aged 31)	Toulouse, France
France	Jean-Pierre Miens	1 November 1949 (aged 22)	
Great Britain	Eddie Arnold	20 November 1949 (aged 22)	
Great Britain	Bill Norgrave	15 April 1947 (aged 25)	
Great Britain	Stan Wild	19 February 1944 (aged 28)	Bolton upon Dearne, England
Hungary	István Bérczi	1 July 1945 (aged 27)	Nagycenk, Hungary
Hungary	Béla Herczeg	13 June 1947 (aged 25)	Debrecen, Hungary
Hungary	István Kiss	19 December 1948 (aged 23)	Budapest, Hungary
Hungary	Antal Kisteleki	16 January 1945 (aged 27)	Székesfehérvár, Hungary
Hungary	Zoltán Magyar	13 December 1953 (aged 18)	Budapest, Hungary
Hungary	Imre Molnár	30 March 1949 (aged 23)	Miskolc, Hungary
Italy	Luigi Coppa	25 September 1950 (aged 21)	Turin, Italy
Italy	Franco Donegà	13 September 1952 (aged 19)	Genoa, Italy
Italy	Adolfo Lampronti	5 June 1949 (aged 23)	Ferrara, Italy
Italy	Carmine Luppino	10 January 1948 (aged 24)	Seminara, Italy
Italy	Maurizio Milanetto	14 July 1953 (aged 19)	Padua, Italy
Italy	Fedele Spatazza	26 June 1954 (aged 18)	Tunis, Tunisia
Japan	Shigeru Kasamatsu	16 July 1947 (aged 25)	Kumano, Japan
Japan	Sawao Kato	11 October 1946 (aged 25)	Gosen, Japan
Japan	Eizo Kenmotsu	13 February 1948 (aged 24)	Okayama Prefecture, Japan
Japan	Akinori Nakayama	1 March 1943 (aged 29)	Nagoya, Japan
Japan	Teruichi Okamura	27 May 1948 (aged 24)	Osaka Prefecture, Japan
Japan	Mitsuo Tsukahara	22 December 1947 (aged 24)	Tokyo, Japan
Liechtenstein	Bruno Banzer	17 June 1947 (aged 25)	
Mexico	Rogelio Mendoza	2 May 1944 (aged 28)	Mexico City, Mexico
New Zealand	Terry Sale	5 July 1951 (aged 21)	Auckland, New Zealand
North Korea	Ho Yun-hang	20 October 1950 (aged 21)	
North Korea	Jo Jong-ryol	1 February 1940 (aged 32)	
North Korea	Kim Song-il	27 February 1946 (aged 26)	
North Korea	Kim Song-yu	7 November 1948 (aged 23)	
North Korea	Li Song-sob	4 June 1953 (aged 19)	
North Korea	Shin Heung-do	24 May 1942 (aged 30)	
Norway	Tore Lie	3 November 1945 (aged 26)	Bergen, Norway
Poland	Jerzy Kruża	29 November 1943 (aged 28)	Ruda Śląska, Poland
Poland	Mikołaj Kubica	27 October 1945 (aged 26)	Niedobczyce, Poland
Poland	Sylwester Kubica	28 December 1949 (aged 22)	Niedobczyce, Poland
Poland	Wilhelm Kubica	29 December 1943 (aged 28)	Niedobczyce, Poland
Poland	Mieczysław Strzałka	20 March 1947 (aged 25)	Bielsko-Biała, Poland
Poland	Andrzej Szajna	30 September 1949 (aged 22)	Wrocław, Poland
Romania	Mircea Gheorghiu	8 August 1948 (aged 24)	Bucharest, Romania
Romania	Dan Grecu	23 September 1950 (aged 21)	Bucharest, Romania
Romania	Petre Mihăiuc	5 July 1948 (aged 24)	Bucharest, Romania
Romania	Nicolae Oprescu	1 March 1953 (aged 19)	Bucharest, Romania
Romania	Gheorghe Păunescu	20 January 1948 (aged 24)	Craiova, Romania
Romania	Constantin Petrescu	8 January 1951 (aged 21)	Bucharest, Romania
Soviet Union	Nikolai Andrianov	14 October 1952 (aged 19)	Vladimir, Russian SFSR
Soviet Union	Viktor Klimenko	25 February 1949 (aged 23)	Moscow, Russian SFSR
Soviet Union	Aleksandr Maleyev	7 July 1947 (aged 25)	Voronezh, Russian SFSR
Soviet Union	Edvard Mikaelian	25 May 1950 (aged 22)	Yerevan, Armenian SSR
Soviet Union	Vladimir Shchukin	4 April 1952 (aged 20)	Minsk, Byelorussian SSR
Soviet Union	Mikhail Voronin	26 March 1945 (aged 27)	Moscow, Russian SFSR
Spain	José Ginés	18 February 1946 (aged 26)	Madrid, Spain
Spain	Agustín Sandoval	8 October 1947 (aged 24)	Bélmez, Spain
Spain	Cecilio Ugarte	29 November 1947 (aged 24)	Vitoria-Gasteiz, Spain
Switzerland	Robert Bretscher	6 August 1953 (aged 19)	Winterthur, Switzerland
Switzerland	Max Brühwiler	8 March 1948 (aged 24)	
Switzerland	Hans Ettlin	10 March 1945 (aged 27)	Kerns, Switzerland
Switzerland	Philippe Gaille	8 October 1951 (aged 20)	
Switzerland	Edwin Greutmann	14 October 1946 (aged 25)	Beggingen, Switzerland
Switzerland	Peter Rohner	12 April 1949 (aged 23)	St. Gallen, Switzerland
United States	Marshall Avener	10 December 1950 (aged 21)	Brooklyn, New York
United States	John Crosby Jr.	29 June 1951 (aged 21)	New York, New York
United States	Jim Culhane Jr.	13 August 1942 (aged 30)	Rochester, New York
United States	George Greenfield	5 May 1948 (aged 24)	Altadena, California
United States	Steve Hug	20 May 1952 (aged 20)	Highland, Illinois
United States	Makoto Sakamoto	8 April 1947 (aged 25)	Tokyo, Japan
West Germany	Bernd Effing	26 April 1948 (aged 24)	Neukirchen, West Germany
West Germany	Eberhard Gienger	21 July 1951 (aged 21)	Künzelsau, West Germany
West Germany	Heinz Häussler	7 November 1940 (aged 31)	Lindau, West Germany
West Germany	Walter Mößinger	1 March 1949 (aged 23)	Emmendingen, West Germany
West Germany	Reinhard Ritter	24 September 1948 (aged 23)	Haßloch, West Germany
West Germany	Günter Spies	22 January 1948 (aged 24)	Kenzingen, West Germany
Yugoslavia	Janez Brodnik	6 May 1944 (aged 28)	Golnik, Yugoslavia
Yugoslavia	Ivica Hmjelovac	2 May 1946 (aged 26)	Slavonski Brod, Yugoslavia
Yugoslavia	Zoran Ivanović	27 August 1949 (aged 22)	
Yugoslavia	Milenko Kersnić	21 June 1946 (aged 26)	Ljubljana, Yugoslavia
Yugoslavia	Drago Šoštarić	30 January 1943 (aged 29)	Maribor, Yugoslavia
Yugoslavia	Miloš Vratič	11 May 1948 (aged 24)	Ljubljana, Yugoslavia
