= Gymnastics at the 1972 Summer Olympics – Women's artistic team all-around =

Women's artistic team all-around at the Games of the XX Olympiad

Medalists
1st place, gold medalist(s)		Lyubov Burda, Antonina Koshel, Olga Korbut, Tamara Lazakovich, Elvira Saadi, Ludmilla Tourischeva	Soviet Union
2nd place, silver medalist(s)		Irene Abel, Angelika Hellmann, Karin Janz, Richarda Schmeißer, Christine Schmitt, Erika Zuchold	East Germany
3rd place, bronze medalist(s)		Ilona Békési, Mónika Császár, Márta Kelemen, Anikó Kéry, Krisztina Medveczky, Zsuzsa Nagy	Hungary

These are the results of the women's team all-around competition, one of six events for female competitors in artistic gymnastics at the 1972 Summer Olympics in Munich. The compulsory and optional rounds took place on August 27 and 28 at the Sports Hall.

The team competition saw the first performance of a standing back somersault on the balance beam, by Soviet gymnast Olga Korbut.

== Results ==
The final score for each team was determined by combining all of the scores earned by the team on each apparatus during the compulsory and optional rounds. If all six gymnasts on a team performed a routine on a single apparatus during compulsories or optionals, only the five highest scores on that apparatus counted toward the team total.

Rank	Team	Vault			Uneven Bars			Balance Beam			Floor			Total	Rank
Rank	Team	C	O	Rank	C	O	Rank	C	O	Rank	C	O	Rank	Total	Rank
Gold medal	Soviet Union	95.200		1	95.250		2	94.100		1	95.950		1	380.500	
Gold medal	Ludmilla Tourischeva	9.600	9.700	1	9.600	9.650	4	9.050	9.750	4	9.800	9.700	1	76.850	1
Gold medal	Olga Korbut	9.450	9.600	4	9.600	9.700	2	9.250	9.750	2	9.600	9.750	2	76.700	3
Gold medal	Tamara Lazakovich	9.600	9.300	6	9.550	9.500	7	9.400	9.750	1	9.700	9.600	3	76.400	4
Gold medal	Lyubov Burda	9.500	9.550	4	9.450	9.300	10	9.000	9.550	8	9.500	9.500	5	75.350	6
Gold medal	Elvira Saadi	9.400	9.400	9	9.200	9.400	18	9.200	9.250	10	9.400	9.400	9	74.650	8
Gold medal	Antonina Koshel	9.200	9.400	12	9.500	8.500	49	8.950	9.400	12	9.350	8.700	33	73.000	20
Silver medal	East Germany	94.750		2	95.650		1	91.900		2	94.250		2	376.550	
Silver medal	Karin Janz	9.450	9.800	2	9.850	9.700	1	9.350	9.500	3	9.500	9.700	4	76.850	1
Silver medal	Erika Zuchold	9.450	9.700	3	9.700	9.600	2	9.250	9.350	6	9.400	9.550	7	76.000	5
Silver medal	Angelika Hellmann	9.350	9.500	7	9.600	9.500	6	9.150	9.200	12	9.400	9.600	6	75.300	7
Silver medal	Irene Abel	9.300	9.550	7	9.200	9.400	18	8.900	9.000	22	9.150	9.250	22	73.750	13
Silver medal	Christine Schmitt	9.300	9.350	11	9.300	9.300	18	8.900	9.050	21	9.200	9.300	13	73.700	14
Silver medal	Richarda Schmeißer	9.250	8.450	56	9.550	9.450	8	9.150	8.850	17	9.050	9.450	13	73.200	17
Bronze medal	Hungary	91.350		4	93.850		3	91.500		3	91.550		5	368.250	
Bronze medal	Ilona Békési	8.900	9.400	19	9.600	9.550	5	9.150	9.300	10	9.100	9.400	13	74.400	9
Bronze medal	Mónika Császár	9.050	9.300	16	9.150	9.250	31	9.250	9.400	5	9.150	9.300	19	73.850	12
Bronze medal	Krisztina Medveczky	8.850	9.200	35	9.400	9.350	10	9.150	9.350	9	9.000	9.300	25	73.600	15
Bronze medal	Anikó Kéry	9.000	9.400	15	9.400	9.300	13	8.850	8.950	27	8.950	9.550	13	73.400	16
Bronze medal	Márta Kelemen	8.900	9.350	22	9.450	9.400	9	9.000	9.100	16	8.850	8.950	53	73.000	20
Bronze medal	Zsuzsa Nagy	8.850	9.150	37	9.150	9.100	39	8.800	8.750	34	8.800	8.850	62	71.450	41
4	United States	90.900		5	91.900		6	90.900		4	92.200		3	365.900	
4	Cathy Rigby	9.100	9.150	22	9.200	9.400	18	9.250	9.350	6	9.300	9.500	9	74.250	10
4	Kimberly Chace	9.100	9.100	26	9.100	9.200	36	9.250	8.950	14	9.100	9.250	23	73.050	18
4	Roxanne Pierce	8.900	9.250	28	9.200	9.300	22	9.000	9.000	17	8.950	8.950	45	72.550	25
4	Joan Moore	8.900	9.100	37	9.000	9.100	46	9.200	8.650	25	9.150	9.400	11	72.500	26
4	Linda Metheny	8.950	9.200	28	9.250	9.100	35	8.400	9.100	35	9.150	9.350	13	72.500	26
4	Nancy Thies	9.050	9.100	28	8.850	9.150	49	8.900	8.900	27	8.950	9.050	38	71.950	35
5	Czechoslovakia	92.300		3	92.950		4	88.700		6	91.050		6	365.000	
5	Marianna Némethová-Krajčírová	9.300	9.400	10	9.250	9.400	14	9.100	9.100	14	9.100	9.350	19	74.000	11
5	Zdena Dorňáková	9.300	9.250	14	9.300	9.350	14	8.850	8.300	54	9.150	9.400	11	72.900	23
5	Soňa Brázdová	9.200	9.150	16	9.350	9.400	10	8.900	8.700	33	9.000	9.100	30	72.800	24
5	Zdena Bujnáčková	9.000	9.200	26	9.150	9.150	36	9.000	9.000	17	8.900	9.100	38	72.500	26
5	Hana Lišková	9.150	9.150	19	9.200	9.250	26	8.950	8.400	42	8.950	9.000	43	72.050	33
5	Marcela Váchová	9.000	9.350	16	9.200	9.250	26	8.750	8.700	37	8.800	8.900	59	71.950	35
6	Romania	90.400		6	90.800		8	87.650		7	91.850		4	360.700	
6	Elena Ceampelea	8.850	9.250	33	9.000	9.150	42	8.850	9.050	22	9.400	9.500	8	73.050	18
6	Alina Goreac	8.900	9.350	22	9.100	9.300	31	8.950	8.300	50	9.050	9.300	23	72.250	30
6	Anca Grigoraș	8.550	9.200	52	9.000	9.050	47	8.850	8.950	27	9.250	9.250	13	72.100	31
6	Elisabeta Turcu	8.850	9.200	35	8.950	9.200	42	8.750	8.400	54	8.900	8.950	47	71.200	44
6	Paula Ioan	8.900	9.350	22	9.000	8.300	74	8.600	8.700	47	9.200	9.050	26	71.100	46
6	Marcela Păunescu	8.500	9.200	56	8.800	9.050	54	8.700	8.450	54	8.850	8.950	53	70.500	55
7	Japan	89.350		9	92.000		5	88.750		5	89.650		7	359.750	
7	Miyuki Matsuhisa	8.800	9.200	37	9.250	9.400	14	9.100	8.600	32	8.950	9.200	28	72.500	26
7	Takako Hasegawa	8.800	9.200	37	9.250	9.250	22	8.900	8.550	37	8.950	9.100	33	72.000	34
7	Aiko Hirashima	8.800	9.150	44	9.300	9.200	22	8.950	8.900	25	8.600	9.055	62	71.950	37
7	Kayoko Saka	8.550	8.950	69	9.100	9.200	36	9.100	8.900	17	9.000	9.000	38	71.800	40
7	Kazue Hanyu	8.700	9.200	46	9.000	9.000	49	9.000	8.750	30	8.850	8.800	62	71.300	43
7	Toshiko Miyamoto	8.550	8.900	75	8.950	9.050	49	8.600	8.450	64	8.750	8.750	74	70.000	60
8	West Germany	90.150		7	91.350		7	87.000		8	89.450		9	357.950	
8	Uta Schorn	8.900	9.400	19	9.150	9.300	26	8.900	8.450	42	8.950	9.050	38	72.100	31
8	Jutta Oltersdorf	8.950	9.150	33	9.050	9.350	31	8.800	8.550	42	9.000	9.100	30	71.950	37
8	Andrea Niederheide	8.959	8.900	49	9.100	9.350	26	8.450	8.650	62	8.800	8.900	59	71.100	46
8	Angelika Kern	8.700	8.900	61	8.850	9.150	49	8.650	8.850	35	8.850	9.000	47	70.950	48
8	Ulrike Weyh	8.900	9.000	46	8.800	9.050	54	0.000	0.000	40	8.750	8.900	62	70.850	50
8	Ingrid Santer	8.800	9.200	37	9.000	7.350	100	8.050	8.700	79	8.900	8.850	58	68.850	76
9	Netherlands	88.200		11	89.550		10	86.850		9	88.900		10	353.500	
9	Ans van Gerwen	8.850	9.300	28	9.200	9.450	14	8.700	9.200	22	8.950	9.300	26	72.950	22
9	Ans Dekker	8.700	8.850	65	8.800	9.050	54	0.000	0.000	40	8.650	8.600	90	70.100	59
9	Ikina Morsch	8.700	8.800	69	8.400	8.800	80	8.150	8.650	75	8.900	9.100	38	69.500	66
9	Nel van der Voort	8.700	8.750	75	8.600	8.850	70	8.500	8.550	64	8.600	8.800	82	69.350	67
9	Linda Toorop	8.750	8.800	65	9.000	9.150	42	8.650	7.350	106	8.800	8.700	74	69.200	69
9	Margo Velema	8.600	8.550	91	7.550	9.050	96	8.500	8.650	54	8.700	9.000	59	68.600	79
10	Poland	88.000		12	88.500		11	84.700		12	89.600		8	350.900	
10	Łucja Matraszek	8.900	9.100	37	9.000	9.500	22	8.250	8.350	91	9.100	8.950	33	71.150	45
10	Joanna Bartosz	8.650	8.900	65	8.900	9.250	42	8.350	8.250	91	9.200	9.250	19	70.750	52
10	Małgorzata Barlak-Kamasińska	8.700	8.800	69	8.650	8.450	82	8.600	8.650	50	9.000	8.850	47	69.700	63
10	Danuta Fidusiewicz	8.600	8.700	84	8.500	8.450	87	8.550	8.650	53	8.900	8.750	62	69.100	72
10	Dorota Klencz	8.400	8.750	91	8.400	8.850	77	8.500	8.150	89	8.750	8.750	74	68.550	80
10	Danuta Lubowska	8.600	9.100	56	7.750	9.000	91	7.750	8.550	98	8.750	8.850	70	68.350	85
11	Canada	89.200		10	87.700		13	84.550		13	88.800		11	350.250	
11	Jennifer Diachun	8.800	9.100	46	8.500	9.250	60	8.650	8.450	62	9.000	9.100	30	70.850	50
11	Teresa McDonnell	8.700	9.050	52	8.500	8.900	71	0.000	0.000	40	8.950	9.000	43	70.500	55
11	Nancy McDonnell	8.700	9.300	37	8.600	9.050	63	8.450	8.500	67	8.750	8.800	72	70.150	57
11	Lise Arsenault	8.700	9.100	51	8.600	8.800	71	7.850	8.400	100	8.900	8.900	53	69.250	68
11	Sharon Tsukamoto	8.600	8.850	75	8.200	8.900	82	8.400	8.350	79	8.600	8.650	90	68.550	80
11	Susan Buchanan	8.750	9.000	52	8.600	8.700	74	7.950	7.250	116	8.600	8.800	82	67.650	91
12	Italy	85.050		18	90.150		9	86.300		10	88.300		12	349.800	
12	Gabriella Marchi	8.800	8.350	91	9.050	9.400	26	8.600	8.700	47	8.950	9.100	33	70.900	49
12	Monica Stefani	8.700	8.450	91	8.750	9.300	47	8.100	8.750	72	8.800	8.850	62	69.700	63
12	Cinzia Delisi	8.550	8.350	105	8.550	8.950	67	8.600	8.750	42	8.650	8.650	87	69.050	73
12	Rita Peri	8.550	7.500	116	8.900	9.350	39	7.850	9.000	72	8.900	8.900	53	68.950	75
12	Maria Grazia Mancuso	8.400	8.250	110	8.650	9.000	63	8.500	8.250	79	8.700	8.800	74	68.550	80
12	Angela Alberti	8.600	8.450	97	8.050	9.200	77	8.550	8.750	47	8.250	8.600	112	68.450	83
13	Switzerland	87.450		13	87.750		12	85.350		11	87.750		15	348.300	
13	Käthi Fritschi	8.850	9.300	28	8.900	9.300	41	8.850	8.900	30	8.800	9.050	47	71.950	37
13	Patrizia Bazzi	8.950	9.000	44	9.000	9.400	31	8.550	8.600	54	8.900	8.950	47	71.350	42
13	Judith Steiger	8.400	8.100	112	8.800	9.050	54	8.550	7.550	105	8.700	8.800	74	67.950	90
13	Liselotte Marti	8.650	8.650	84	8.850	7.250	108	8.700	8.550	50	8.500	8.500	107	67.650	91
13	Jacqueline Sievert	8.450	8.650	95	8.450	8.250	92	7.800	8.450	100	8.600	8.700	87	67.350	95
13	Christine Steger	8.600	8.350	102	7.650	7.750	116	7.950	8.250	103	8.550	8.700	90	65.800	110
14	Norway	87.200		14	87.300		14	84.150		16	88.150		13	346.800	
14	Unni Holmen	8.700	9.050	52	8.850	8.950	58	8.600	8.550	54	8.850	9.050	45	70.600	54
14	Jill Schau	8.450	8.850	84	8.950	8.750	62	8.600	8.200	75	8.800	9.000	53	69.600	65
14	Gro Sandberg	8.600	8.750	81	8.650	8.850	67	8.400	8.400	75	8.800	8.750	72	69.200	69
14	Sidsel Ekholdt	8.550	8.850	78	8.650	7.900	97	8.350	8.400	79	8.750	8.900	62	68.450	83
14	Trine Andresen	8.600	8.750	81	7.250	8.450	114	8.350	8.300	89	8.500	8.650	96	66.850	104
14	Bente Hansen	8.300	8.800	95	8.350	8.850	80	7.850	7.450	115	8.500	8.750	90	66.850	104
15	France	86.700		15	87.250		15	84.350		15	87.900		14	346.200	
15	Mireille Cayre	8.650	8.950	61	8.600	9.200	58	8.550	8.600	54	8.950	9.200	28	70.700	53
15	Véronique Tilmont	8.800	8.700	69	8.650	9.100	60	8.650	8.400	64	8.850	9.000	47	70.150	57
15	Pascale Hermant	8.650	8.650	84	8.250	8.850	82	8.700	8.050	79	8.750	8.750	74	68.650	78
15	Catherine Daugé	8.600	8.300	105	8.200	9.050	77	8.450	8.250	85	8.550	8.600	96	68.000	88
15	Nadine Audin	8.600	8.800	78	7.850	8.850	92	8.400	8.300	85	8.550	8.650	95	68.000	88
15	Elvire Gertosio	8.500	0.000	118	8.500	7.950	99	8.400	7.450	108	8.600	0.000	118	49.400	118
16	Bulgaria	89.500		8	84.400		16	84.500		14	87.650		16	346.050	
16	Irina Khitrova	8.950	8.700	59	8.700	8.900	65	8.500	8.650	54	8.800	8.800	70	70.000	60
16	Elena Georgieva	9.000	8.859	49	8.200	8.850	85	8.650	8.200	72	8.650	8.650	87	69.050	73
16	Maya Blagoeva	9.300	9.300	12	9.000	6.250	117	8.300	8.600	69	9.050	9.000	33	68.800	77
16	Reneta Tsvetkova	8.900	8.750	59	8.400	8.500	89	8.350	8.200	95	8.500	8.600	99	61.800	86
16	Evdokia Pandezova	9.000	8.400	78	8.350	7.500	111	8.650	8.250	69	8.900	8.550	81	67.600	94
16	Marieta Ilieva	8.750	8.760	69	8.550	7.650	106	8.500	7.850	97	8.650	8.500	96	67.200	98
17	Yugoslavia	85.850		16	83.750		17	83.550		17	86.400		17	339.550	
17	Nataša Bajin-Šljepica	8.750	8.600	81	8.500	9.000	67	8.650	8.700	42	8.750	8.900	62	69.850	62
17	Slaviča Kundačina	8.800	8.750	65	7.900	8.350	105	8.400	8.350	79	8.500	8.600	99	67.650	91
17	Marija Težak	8.550	8.700	88	7.800	8.550	100	8.300	8.400	85	8.500	8.550	104	67.350	95
17	Nevenka Puškarević	8.550	8.650	89	7.450	8.750	106	8.500	8.400	69	8.350	8.350	115	67.000	102
17	Erna Havelka	8.550	8.450	101	8.050	8.650	92	7.600	8.150	111	8.650	8.850	74	66.950	103
17	Olga Bumbić	8.650	8.400	97	8.000	8.550	97	7.700	7.800	114	8.600	8.500	99	66.200	108
18	Great Britain	83.050		19	83.000		18	82.400		18	85.500		18	333.950	
18	Pamela Hutchinson	8.400	8.300	109	8.150	8.500	95	8.450	8.500	67	8.450	8.350	113	67.100	99
18	Elaine Willett	8.450	8.350	107	8.400	9.000	71	8.350	8.200	93	8.500	7.800	117	67.050	101
18	Barbara Alred	8.100	8.400	112	8.150	8.200	100	8.500	8.300	75	8.450	8.550	107	66.650	107
18	Avril Lennox	8.250	8.500	108	8.100	8.200	103	7.900	7.650	112	8.450	8.600	104	65.650	111
18	Pamela Hopkins	7.500	8.600	115	8.050	8.000	109	7.950	7.850	110	8.200	8.750	109	64.900	114
18	Yvonne Mugridge	6.100	8.500	117	8.150	8.150	103	8.100	8.200	98	8.650	8.750	82	64.600	116
19	Mexico	85.200		17	83.000		18	80.500		19	85.200		19	333.900	
19	Ana María Casas	8.450	8.500	102	8.600	8.700	74	8.300	8.150	95	8.500	8.850	85	68.050	87
19	Patricia Ollinger	8.700	8.350	97	8.450	8.550	86	7.850	8.300	104	8.350	8.700	104	67.250	97
19	Patricia García	8.600	8.600	89	8.500	8.350	90	8.350	7.900	100	8.250	8.550	113	67.100	99
19	Laura Rivera	8.250	8.350	111	7.700	8.200	110	7.700	8.150	108	8.350	8.600	109	65.300	112
19	María Antonieta Hernández	8.400	8.650	97	7.950	7.900	111	7.950	7.600	112	7.650	8.700	116	64.800	115
19	Hilda Amezaga	8.400	8.550	102	7.750	7.950	114	7.950	7.100	117	8.300	8.600	111	64.600	116
	Marie Lundqvist-Björk (SWE)	8.800	8.800	61	8.500	9.050	66	8.300	8.400	85	8.600	8.750	85	69.200	69
	Diane Foote (NZL)	8.600	8.900	69	7.950	7.800	113	8.400	8.100	94	8.350	8.750	99	66.850	104
	Jennifer Sunderland (AUS)	8.650	8.950	61	8.200	7.000	118	8.100	7.850	107	8.400	8.700	99	65.850	109
	Pepita Sánchez (ESP)	8.000	8.450	114	8.050	8.900	87	8.400	6.250	118	8.550	8.700	90	65.300	112
