= Gymnastics at the 1972 Summer Olympics – Women's artistic individual all-around =

Women's artistic individual all-around at the Games of the XX Olympiad
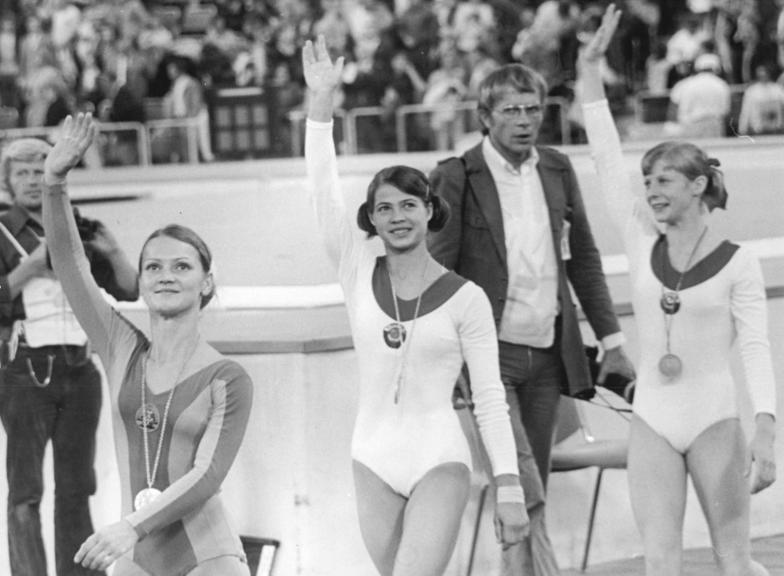
- Janz, Tourischeva, and Lazakovich with their medals
- Competitors: 118 from 28 nations

Medalists
1st place, gold medalist(s)		Ludmila Tourischeva	Soviet Union
2nd place, silver medalist(s)		Karin Janz	East Germany
3rd place, bronze medalist(s)		Tamara Lazakovich	Soviet Union

These are the results of the women's individual all-around competition, one of six events for female competitors in artistic gymnastics at the 1972 Summer Olympics in Munich. The qualification and final rounds took place on August 27, 28 and 30th at the Sports Hall. This was the first time that the all-around was contested on a separate day from the team final; previously, the gymnasts' scores during the compulsory and optional rounds of team competition would determine the all-around winner.

== Results ==
=== Qualification ===
One-hundred eighteen gymnasts competed in the compulsory and optional rounds on August 27 and 28. The thirty-six highest scoring gymnasts advanced to the final on August 30. There was no limit as to how many competitors each country could have in the final. Half of the points earned by each gymnast during both the compulsory and optional rounds carried over to the final. This constitutes each gymnast's "prelim" score.

=== Final ===
Rank	Gymnast	Prelim	Vault	Uneven Bars	Balance Beam	Floor	Final	Total
Gold medal	Ludmila Tourischeva (URS)	38.425	9.650	9.650	9.400	9.900	38.600	77.025
Silver medal	Karin Janz (GDR)	38.425	9.650	9.700	9.400	9.700	38.450	76.875
Bronze medal	Tamara Lazakovich (URS)	38.200	9.550	9.700	9.750	9.650	38.650	76.850
4	Erika Zuchold (GDR)	38.000	9.700	9.650	9.500	9.600	38.450	76.450
5	Lyubov Burda (URS)	37.675	9.550	9.500	9.400	9.650	38.100	75.775
6	Angelika Hellmann (GDR)	37.650	9.500	9.600	9.250	9.550	37.900	75.550
7	Olga Korbut (URS)	38.350	9.650	7.500	9.800	9.800	36.750	75.100
8	Elvira Saadi (URS)	37.325	9.400	9.400	9.400	9.550	37.750	75.075
9	Ilona Bekesi (HUN)	37.200	9.400	9.550	9.300	9.500	37.750	74.950
10	Cathy Rigby (USA)	37.125	9.400	9.500	9.350	9.550	37.800	74.925
11	Irene Abel (GDR)	36.875	9.500	9.500	9.350	9.400	37.750	74.625
12	Richarda Schmeisser (GDR)	36.600	9.600	9.500	9.350	9.450	37.900	74.500
13	Krisztina Medveczky (HUN)	36.800	9.300	9.400	9.600	9.350	37.650	74.450
14	Monika Csaszar (HUN)	36.925	9.300	9.400	9.400	9.400	37.500	74.425
15	Christine Schmitt (GDR)	36.850	9.350	9.500	9.200	9.500	37.55	74.400
16	Antonina Koshel (URS)	36.500	9.500	9.400	9.400	9.400	37.700	74.200
17	Aniko Kery (HUN)	36.700	9.200	9.350	9.200	9.550	37.300	74.000
18	Mariana Nemethova (TCH)	37.000	9.450	9.400	9.000	9.050	36.900	73.900
19	Ans Van Gerwen (NED)	36.475	9.300	9.350	9.150	9.300	37.100	73.575
20	Miyuki Matsuhisa (JPN)	36.250	9.400	9.150	9.350	9.350	37.250	73.500
21	Joan Moore (USA)	36.250	9.250	9.350	9.100	9.500	37.200	73.450
22	Elena Ceampelea (ROU)	36.525	9.400	9.250	8.650	9.550	36.850	73.375
23	Uta Schorn (FRG)	36.050	9.500	9.400	9.150	9.200	37.250	73.300
24	Soňa Brázdová (TCH)	36.400	9.200	9.200	9.200	9.250	36.850	73.250
25	Eiko Hirashima (JPN)	35.975	9.350	9.250	9.250	9.250	37.100	73.075
26	Käthi Fritschi (SUI)	35.975	9.350	9.350	9.100	9.250	37.050	73.025
27	Zdena Dorňáková (TCH)	36.450	9.300	9.400	8.550	9.250	36.500	72.950
28	Kimberly Chace (USA)	36.525	9.200	8.400	9.400	9.400	36.400	72.925
29	Anca Grigoraș (ROU)	36.050	9.300	9.200	9.000	9.300	36.800	72.850
30	Zdenka Bujnáčková (TCH)	36.250	9.300	9.300	9.200	8.800	36.600	72.850
31	Alina Goreac (ROU)	36.125	9.350	8.700	9.300	9.350	36.700	72.825
32	Hana Liskova (TCH)	36.025	9.250	9.150	9.100	9.100	36.600	72.625
33	Roxanne Pierce (USA)	36.275	9.300	9.250	8.450	9.200	36.200	72.475
34	Marta Kelemen (HUN)	36.500	9.350	8.000	9.000	9.300	35.650	72.150
35	Takako Hasegawa (JPN)	36.000	9.300	8.150	9.100	9.300	35.850	71.850
36	Linda Metheny (USA)	36.250	0.000	0.000	0.000	0.000	0.000	36.250
