= Poland at the 1972 Summer Olympics =

- IOC code: POL
- NOC: Polish Olympic Committee

in Munich, West Germany August 26, 1972 – September 10, 1972
- Competitors: 290 (252 men and 38 women) in 22 sports
- Flag bearer: Waldemar Baszanowski
- Medals Ranked 7th: Gold 7 Silver 5 Bronze 9 Total 21

Summer Olympics appearances (overview)
- 1924; 1928; 1932; 1936; 1948; 1952; 1956; 1960; 1964; 1968; 1972; 1976; 1980; 1984; 1988; 1992; 1996; 2000; 2004; 2008; 2012; 2016; 2020; 2024; 2028

Other related appearances
- Russian Empire (1900, 1912); Austria (1908–1912)

Poland competed at the 1972 Summer Olympics in Munich, West Germany. 290 competitors, 252 men and 38 women, took part in 150 events in 22 sports.

== Medalists ==
=== Gold ===
- Wladyslaw Komar - Athletics, Men's Shot Put
- Jan Szczepański - Boxing, Men's Flyweight
- Witold Woyda - Fencing, Men's Foil Individual
- Marek Dąbrowski, Jerzy Kaczmarek, Lech Koziejowski, Witold Woyda, and Arkadiusz Godel - Fencing, Men's Foil Team
- Anczok, Ćmikiewicz, Deyna, Gadocha, Gorgoń, Gut, Jarosik, Kmiecik, Kostka, Kraska, Lato, Lubański, Marx, Maszczyk, Ostafiński, Szeja, Szołtysik, Szymanowski, and Szymczak - Football, Men's Team Competition
- Józef Zapędzki - Shooting, 25m Rapid Fire Pistol (60 shots)
- Zygmunt Smalcerz - Weightlifting, Men's Flyweight

=== Silver ===
- Irena Szydłowska - Archery, Women's Individual Competition
- Wiesław Rudkowski - Boxing, Men's Light Middleweight
- Lucjan Lis, Edward Barcik, Stanisław Szozda, and Ryszard Szurkowski - Cycling, Men's Road Team Time Trial
- Antoni Zajkowski - Judo, Men's Half-Middleweight
- Norbert Ozimek - Weightlifting, Men's Light-Heavyweight

=== Bronze ===
- Irena Szewińska - Athletics, Women's 200m
- Ryszard Katus - Athletics, Men's Decathlon
- Leszek Błażyński - Boxing, Men's Flyweight
- Janusz Gortat - Boxing, Men's Light Heavyweight
- Władysław Szuszkiewicz and Rafal Maciej Piszcz - Canoe, Men's Kayak Flatwater K-2 1.000m
- Andrzej Bek, and Benedykt Kocot - Cycling Track, Men's 2.000m Tandem
- Zbigniew Kaczmarek - Weightlifting, Men's Lightweight
- Kazimierz Lipień - Wrestling Greco-Roman, Men's Featherweight
- Czesław Kwieciński - Wrestling Greco-Roman, Men's Light-Heavyweight

== Archery ==
In the first modern archery competition at the Olympics, Poland entered one man and three women. They took home a silver medal in the women's competition.

Men

Athlete	Event	Round 1		Round 2		Total score	
Athlete	Event	Score	Seed	Score	Seed	Score	Seed
Tomasz Leżański	Individual	1128	41	1109	48	2237	46

Women

Athlete	Event	Round 1		Round 2		Total score	
Athlete	Event	Score	Seed	Score	Seed	Score	Seed
Maria Mączyńska	Individual	1173	12	1198	5	2371	6
Jadwiga Szoszler-Wilejto	Individual	1165	14	1132	22	2297	18
Irena Szydłowska	Individual	1224 OR	1	1183	9	2407	Silver medal

== Athletics ==
Men
Track & road events

Athlete	Event	Heat		Quarterfinal		Semifinal		Final	
Athlete	Event	Result	Rank	Result	Rank	Result	Rank	Result	Rank
Andrzej Badeński	400 m	46.21	1 Q	46.19	2 Q	46.38	8	Did not advance	
Tadeusz Cuch	100 m	10.89	5	Did not advance					
Tadeusz Gorzechowski	20 km walk	—N/a						DNS	
Zbigniew Jaremski	400 m	46.20	2 Q	46.52	3 Q	DNS		Did not advance	
Marek Jóźwik	110 m hurdles	14.06	2 Q	—N/a		14.06	5	Did not advance	
Tadeusz Kulczycki	400 m hurdles	50.19	4 Q	—N/a		50.80	5	Did not advance	
Andrzej Kupczyk	800 m	1:48.5	2 Q	—N/a		1:46.69	4 Q	1:47.10	7
Bronisław Malinowski	3000 m steeplechase	8:28.2	2 Q	—N/a				8:28.0	4
Bronisław Malinowski	5000 m	13:48.2	8	Did not advance					
Kazimierz Maranda	3000 m steeplechase	8:50.4	10	—N/a				Did not advance	
Ludomir Nitkowski	20 km walk	—N/a						DNS	
Winicjusz Nowosielski	50 km walk	—N/a						DNS	
Zenon Nowosz	100 m	10.36	3 Q	10.40	4 Q	10.42	4 Q	10.46	7
Zenon Nowosz	200 m	DNS		Did not advance					
Jan Ornoch	20 km walk	—N/a						1:32:01.6	7
Jan Ornoch	50 km walk	—N/a						DNF	
Andrzej Siennicki	50 km walk	—N/a						DNS	
Edward Stawiarz	Marathon	—N/a						2:28:12	40
Henryk Szordykowski	1500 m	3:44.2	3 Q	—N/a		3:42.5	6	Did not advance	
Stanisław Wagner	100 m	10.62	3 Q	10.61	4	Did not advance			
Jan Werner	400 m	45.93	4 Q	46.02	3 Q	46.26	6	Did not advance	
Leszek Wodzyński	110 m hurdles	14.03	3 Q	—N/a		13.81	3 Q	13.72	6
Mirosław Wodzyński	110 m hurdles	14.02	4 Q	—N/a		14.63	8	Did not advance	
Tadeusz Zieliński	3000 m steeplechase	8:49.8	11	—N/a				Did not advance	
Stanisław Wagner; Tadeusz Cuch; Jerzy Czerbniak; Zenon Nowosz	4 × 100 m relay	39.11	1 Q	—N/a		38.90	3 Q	39.03	6
Jan Werner; Jan Balachowski; Zbigniew Jaremski; Andrzej Badeński	4 × 400 m relay	3:02.52	1 Q	—N/a				3:01.05	5

Field events

Athlete	Event	Qualification		Final	
Athlete	Event	Distance	Position	Distance	Position
Bogusław Białek	High jump	—N/a		DNS	
Wojciech Buciarski	Pole vault	5.00	12 q	5.00	10
Grzegorz Cybulski	Long jump	8.01	3 Q	7.58	12
Jerzy Homziuk	Long jump	7.63	20	Did not advance	
Michał Joachimowski	Triple jump	16.43	6 Q	16.69	7
Edmund Jaworski	Javelin throw	—N/a		DNS	
Jan Kobuszewski	Long jump	—N/a		DNS	
Władysław Komar	Shot put	20.60	1 Q	21.18	Gold medal
Stanisław Lubiejewski	Hammer throw	64.80	23	Did not advance	
Tadeusz Ślusarski	Pole vault	5.00	11 q	NM	

Combined events – Decathlon

Athlete	Event	100 m	LJ	SP	HJ	400 m	100H	DT	PV	JT	1500 m	Final	Rank
Tadeusz Janczenko	Result	10.64	7.28	14.45	2.04	49.10	16.89	45.26	4.50	63.80	5:01.5	7861	8
Tadeusz Janczenko	Points	895	877	756	891	847	670	786	932	807	400	7861	8
Ryszard Katus	Result	10.89	7.09	14.39	1.92	49.10	14.41	43.00	4.50	59.96	4:31.9	7984	Bronze medal
Ryszard Katus	Points	831	838	752	788	847	914	744	932	761	577	7984	Bronze medal
Ryszard Skowronek	Result	10.78	7.42	14.24	1.98	48.10	15.74	33.66	NM	DNS	DNS	DNF	
Ryszard Skowronek	Points	859	905	743	840	893	773	555	0	DNS	DNS	DNF	

Women
Track & road events

Athlete	Event	Heat		Quarterfinal		Semifinal		Final	
Athlete	Event	Result	Rank	Result	Rank	Result	Rank	Result	Rank
Krystyna Kacperczyk	400 m	53.85	5 Q	54.39	8	Did not advance			
Teresa Nowak	100 m hurdles	13.16	3 Q	—N/a		13.10	4 Q	13.17	5
Danuta Piecyk	400 m	53.08	3 Q	52.62	5	Did not advance			
Grażyna Rabsztyn	100 m hurdles	13.29	1 Q	—N/a		13.24	4 Q	13.44	8
Elżbieta Skowrońska	800 m	2:03.26	4	Did not advance					
Danuta Straszyńska	100 m hurdles	13.03	2 Q	—N/a		12.91	2 Q	13.18	6
Irena Szewińska	100 m	11.33	2 Q	11.49	2 Q	11.54	6	Did not advance	
Irena Szewińska	200 m	23.37	1 Q	22.79	1 Q	22.92	3 Q	22.74	Bronze medal
Bożena Zientarska	400 m	54.20	4	Did not advance					
Helena Kerner; Barbara Bakulin; Urszula Jóźwik; Danuta Jedrejek	4 × 100 m relay	44.19	4 Q	—N/a				44.20	8
Bozena Zientarska; Krystyna Kacperczyk; Elzbieta Skowronska; Danuta Piecyk	4 × 400 m relay	DSQ		Did not advance					

Field events

Athlete	Event	Qualification		Final	
Athlete	Event	Distance	Position	Distance	Position
Ludwika Chlewińska	Shot Put	17.40	10 Q	18.24	10
Ewa Gryziecka	Javelin throw	53.68	11 q	57.00	7
Daniela Jaworska	Javelin throw	52.40	14	Did not advance	
Krystyna Nadolna	Discus throw	52.52	15	Did not advance	
Irena Szewinska	Long jump	DNS		Did not advance	

== Basketball ==
=== Group B ===
Qualified for the semifinals

Team	W	L	PF	PA	PD	Pts	1st Tie	2nd Tie
Soviet Union	7	0	639	479	+160	14		
Italy	5	2	547	471	+76	12	1W–1L	1.072
SFR Yugoslavia	5	2	582	484	+98	12	1W–1L	1.013
Puerto Rico	5	2	570	531	+39	12	1W–1L	0.917
West Germany	3	4	482	518	−36	10		
Poland	2	5	520	536	−16	9		
Philippines	1	6	526	666	−140	8		
Senegal	0	7	405	586	−181	7		

August 27
9:00

Poland	90–75	Philippines

Rudi-Sedlmayer-Halle, Munich

August 28
21:30

Poland	64–85	SFR Yugoslavia

Rudi-Sedlmayer-Halle, Munich

August 29
10:30

Senegal	59–95	Poland

Rudi-Sedlmayer-Halle, Munich

August 30
9:00

Soviet Union	94–64	Poland

Rudi-Sedlmayer-Halle, Munich

September 1
20:00

Italy	71–59	Poland

Rudi-Sedlmayer-Halle, Munich

September 2
14:30

West Germany	67–65	Poland

Rudi-Sedlmayer-Halle, Munich

September 3
14:30

Poland	83–85	Puerto Rico

Rudi-Sedlmayer-Halle, Munich

=== Classification brackets ===
9th–12th place

Semifinals (September 5)
A5	Spain	76
B6	Poland	87
B5	West Germany	69
A6	Australia	70

9th place (September 9)
B6	Poland	83
A6	Australia	91
11th place (September 8)
A5	Spain	84
B5	West Germany	83

- Team roster

Poland - 10th place

- Ryszard Bialowas
- Janusz Ceglinski
- Eugeniusz Durejko
- Jan Dolczewski
- Andrzej Kasprzak
- Grzegorz Korcz
- Waldemar Kozak
- Piotr Langosz
- Mieczyslaw Łopatka
- Franciszek Niemiec
- Andrzej Pasiorowski
- Andrzej Seweryn

Head coach

== Boxing ==
Men

Athlete	Event	1 Round	2 Round	3 Round	Quarterfinals	Semifinals	Final	
Athlete	Event	Opposition Result	Opposition Result	Opposition Result	Opposition Result	Opposition Result	Opposition Result	Rank
Roman Rozek	Light Flyweight	Lee Suk-Un (KOR); L 0–5	Did not advance					
Leszek Blazynski	Flyweight	BYE	Chander Narayanan (IND); W 3–2	Arturo Delgado (MEX); W 5–0	You Man-Chong (KOR); W 3–2	Georgi Kostadinov (BUL); L 0–5	Did not advance	Bronze medal
Józef Reszpondek	Bantamweight	Aldo Cosentino (FRA); L 0–5	Did not advance					
Ryszard Tomczyk	Featherweight	Juan Francisco García (MEX); W 4–1	Rudolf Vogel (SUI); W KO-2	Boris Kuznetsov (URS); L 0–5	Did not advance			
Jan Szczepanski	Lightweight	BYE	Kasamiro Marchlo (SUD); W 5–0	James Busceme (USA); W 5–0	Charlie Nash (IRL); W TKO-3	Samuel Mbugua (KEN); W WO	László Orbán (HUN); W 5–0	Gold medal
Krzysztof Pierwieniecki	Light Welterweight	Walter Desiderio Gomez (ARG); L 0–5	Did not advance					
Alfons Stawski	Welterweight	BYE	Richard Murunga (KEN); W 1–4	Did not advance				
Wiesław Rudkowski	Light Middleweight	BYE	Antonio Castellini (ITA); W 5–0	Nayden Stanchev (BUL); W 5–0	Rolando Garbey (CUB); W 4–1	Peter Tiepold (GDR); W 4–1	Dieter Kottysch (FRG); L 2–3	Silver medal
Witold Stachurski	Middleweight	BYE	Peter Dula (KEN); W 4–1	Reima Virtanen (FIN); L TKO-3	Did not advance			
Janusz Gortat	Light Heavyweight	Jaroslav Kral (TCH); W 5–0	Raymond Russell (USA); W 3–2	—N/a	Rudi Hornig (FRG); W TKO-1	Mate Parlov (YUG); L 0–5	Did not advance	Bronze medal
Ludwik Denderys	Heavyweight	Teófilo Stevenson (CUB); L TKO-1	Did not advance					

== Canoeing ==
=== Slalom ===
Athlete	Event	Preliminary				Final	
Athlete	Event	Run 1	Rank	Run 2	Rank	Best	Rank
Jan Frączek; Ryszard Seruga	Men's C-2	366.31	5	386.78	6	366.31	5
Jerzy Jeż; Wojciech Kudlik	Men's C-2	DNF		416.10	13	416.10	13
Maciej Rychta; Zbigniew Leśniak	Men's C-2	459.64	12	455.70	16	455.70	17
Jerzy Stanuch	Men's K-1	317.09	8	480.52	34	317.09	14
Wojciech Gawroński	Men's K-1	343.10	13	355.11	20	343.10	23
Maria Ćwiertniewicz	Women's K-1	450.64	3	432.30	3	432.30	4
Kunegunda Godawska-Olchawa	Women's K-1	473.26	5	441.05	5	441.05	5

=== Sprint ===
Men

Athlete	Event	Heats		Repechages		Semifinals		Final	
Athlete	Event	Time	Rank	Time	Rank	Time	Rank	Time	Rank
Jerzy Opara	C-1 1000 m	4:32.39	3 Q	—N/a		BYE		4:21.05	9
Jan Żukowski; Andrzej Gronowicz	C-2 1000 m	4:27.94	5 R	4:05.42	3 Q	4:01.40	4	Did not advance	
Grezgorz Śledziewski	K-1 1000 m	4:03.40	3 Q	BYE		3:55.45	2 Q	3:53.22	8
Władysław Szuzkiewicz; Rafal Piszcz	K-2 1000 m	3:48.13	2 Q	BYE		3:34.50	2 Q	3:33.63	Bronze medal
Zbigniew Niewiadomski; Jerzy Dziadkowiec; Zdzisław Tomyślak; Andrzej Matysiak	K-4 1000 m	3:24.59	2 Q	BYE		3:12.46	4	Did not advance	

Women

Athlete	Event	Heats		Repechages		Semifinals		Final	
Athlete	Event	Time	Rank	Time	Rank	Time	Rank	Time	Rank
Stanisława Szydłowska	K-1 500 m	2:14.75	5	2:10.04	2 Q	2:08.89	4	Did not advance	
Ewa Grajkowska; Izabella Antonowicz	K-2 500 m	2:04.30	4 Q	—N/a		1:55.50	1 Q	1:57.45	6

== Cycling ==
Twelve cyclists represented Poland in 1972.

=== Road ===
Athlete	Event	Time	Rank
Lucjan Lis	Men's road race	4:19:09	36
Jan Smyrak	Men's road race	DNF	
Stanisław Szozda	Men's road race	4:20:41	76
Ryszard Szurkowski	Men's road race	4:14:37	31
Lucjan Lis; Edward Barcik; Stanisław Szozda; Ryszard Szurkowski	Team time trial	2:11:47.5	Silver medal

=== Track ===
1000m time trial

Athlete	Event	Time	Rank
Janusz Kierzkowski	Men's 1000m time trial	1:07.22	5

Men's Sprint

Athlete	Event	Heats	Repechage 1	Round 2	Repechage 2	Round 3	Repechage 3	Repechage Finals	Quarterfinals	Semifinals	Final
Athlete	Event	Time Speed (km/h)	Rank	Opposition Time Speed (km/h)	Opposition Time Speed (km/h)	Opposition Time Speed (km/h)	Opposition Time Speed (km/h)	Opposition Time Speed (km/h)	Opposition Time Speed (km/h)	Opposition Time Speed (km/h)	Rank
Andrzej Bek	Men's sprint	Pkhakadze (URS); Chin (JAM); L	Cambroni (MEX); W 11.86	Vačkář (TCH); Cardi (ITA); L	Berkmann (GDR); W 11.87	Balk (NED); Kravtsov (URS); L	Vačkář (TCH); Pedersen (DEN); L	Did not advance			
Benedykt Kocot	Men's sprint	Cooke (GBR); Snellinx (BEL); W	BYE		Geschke (GDR); Crutchlow (GBR); L	Balk (NED); L	Did not advance				

Pursuit

Athlete	Event	Qualification		Quarterfinals	Semifinals	Final	
Athlete	Event	Time	Rank	Opposition Time	Opposition Time	Opposition Time	Rank
Mieczysław Nowicki	Men's individual pursuit	5:02.28	14	Did not advance			14
Bernard Kręczyński; Paweł Kaczorowski; Janusz Kierzkowski; Mieczysław Nowicki; Jerzy Głowacki	Team pursuit	4:29.00	6 Q	Soviet Union (URS); W 4:25.72	East Germany (GDR); L 4:26.39	Great Britain (GBR); L 4:26.06	4

Men's Tandem

Athlete	Event	Heats	Repechage	Repechage Finals	Quarterfinals	Semifinals	Final	
Athlete	Event	Opposition Time Speed (km/h)	Opposition Time Speed (km/h)	Opposition Time Speed (km/h)	Opposition Time Speed (km/h)	Opposition Time Speed (km/h)	Opposition Time Speed (km/h)	Rank
Andrzej Bek; Benedykt Kocot	Tandem	Verzini; Rossi (ITA); W 10.56	BYE		Barth; Müller (FRG); W 2:0 (10.57; 10.46)	Geschke; Otto (GDR); L 0:2	Morelon; Trentin (FRA); W 2:0 (10.76; 10.67)	Bronze medal

== Diving ==
Men

Athlete	Event	Preliminaries		Final			
Athlete	Event	Points	Rank	Points	Rank	Total	Rank
Jakub Puchow	10 m platform	281.34	17	Did not advance			

Women

Athlete	Event	Preliminaries		Final			
Athlete	Event	Points	Rank	Points	Rank	Total	Rank
Regina Krajnow	3 m springboard	248.91	18	Did not advance			
Regina Krajnow	10 m platform	179.79	17	Did not advance			
Elżbieta Wierniuk	3 m springboard	277.32	6 Q	131.04	8	408.36	8
Elżbieta Wierniuk	10 m platform	188.10	10	121.98	11	310.08	11

== Equestrian ==
=== Eventing ===
Athlete	Horse	Event	Dressage		Cross-country			Jumping			Total	
Athlete	Horse	Event	Dressage		Cross-country			Final			Total	
Athlete	Horse	Event	Penalties	Rank	Penalties	Total	Rank	Penalties	Total	Rank	Penalties	Rank
Marek Małecki	Signor	Individual	57,00	30	32.00	89.00	51	20.00	109,00	31	109,00	31
Wojciech Mickunas	Tenor	Individual	64,67	49	DQ	DNF		DNS			DNF	AC
Jan Skoczylas	Wandal	Individual	45,33	13	132,13	132.13	58	10.00	142,13	36	142,13	36
Jacek Wierzchowiecki	Gniew	Individual	39,67	7	10,47	10.47	19	20.00	30,47	18	30,47	18
Marek Małecki; Wojciech Mickunas; Jan Skoczylas; Jacek Wierzchowiecki	See above	Team	142.00	5	34.80	126.54	11	50.00	281,60	10	281,60	10

=== Show jumping ===
Athlete	Horse	Event	Round 1		Round 2			
Athlete	Horse	Event	Penalties	Rank	Penalties	Rank	Penalties	Rank
Stefan Grodzicki	Biszka	Individual	8.00	17 Q	DNF		Did not advance	17
Marian Kozicki	Bronz	Individual	8.50	21	Did not advance			21
Jan Kowalczyk	Chandzar	Individual	DNS					
Marian Kozicki; Stefan Grodzicki; Piotr Wawryniuk; Jan Kowalczyk	Bronz; Biszka; Poprad; Jastarnia	Team	107.25	12	Did not advance			

== Fencing ==
20 fencers, 15 men and 5 women, represented Poland in 1972.

=== Men ===
Athlete	Event	Round 1		Round 2		Quarterfinal		Semifinal		Final	
Athlete	Event	Opposition Result	Rank	Opposition Result	Rank	Opposition Result	Rank	Opposition Result	Rank	Opposition Result	Rank
Bogdan Gonsior	Men's épée		3 Q		4 Q		4	Did not advance			13
Jerzy Janikowski	Men's épée		3 Q		3 Q		5	Did not advance			
Henryk Nielaba	Men's épée		2 Q		1 Q		4	Did not advance			
Henryk Nielaba; Bohdan Andrzejewski; Bogdan Gonsior; Jerzy Janikowski; Kazimierz Barburski	Team épée	Luxembourg; W 9–6; Mexico; W 11–5; Switzerland; L 6–9	2 Q	—N/a		Hungary; L 1–9		Sweden; W 9–7		Romania; L 3–9	6
Marek Dąbrowski	Men's foil		2 Q		2 Q		1 Q		6	Did not advance	11
Lech Koziejowski	Men's foil		1 Q		4 Q		2 Q		5	Did not advance	9
Witold Woyda	Men's foil		1 Q		1 Q		3 Q		2 Q		
Witold Woyda; Lech Koziejowski; Jerzy Kaczmarek; Marek Dąbrowski; Arkadiusz Godel	Team foil	Italy; W 11–5; West Germany; L 7–8	2 Q	—N/a		Japan; W 9–5		Hungary; W 8–7		Soviet Union; W 9–5	Gold medal
Janusz Majewski	Men's sabre		1 Q		2 Q		2 Q		1 Q		6
Józef Nowara	Men's sabre		1 Q		1 Q		1 Q		4 Q		5
Jerzy Pawłowski	Men's sabre		2 Q		1 Q	Rylsky (URS) W 5–4; Ferrari (ITA) L 2–5; Horváth (HUN) L 1–5; Van Der Auwera (BEL) L 4–5; Morales (USA) W 5–3	4	Did not advance			
Józef Nowara; Jerzy Pawłowski; Krzysztof Grzegorek; Zygmunt Kawecki; Janusz Majewski	Team sabre	Austria; W 12–4; Switzerland; W 12–4; West Germany; W 11–5	1 Q	—N/a		Italy; L 2–9		France; W 9–6		Cuba; W 9–5	5

=== Women ===
Athlete	Event	Elimination round		Quarterfinal		Semifinal		Final	
Athlete	Event	Opposition Result	Rank	Opposition Result	Rank	Opposition Result	Rank	Opposition Result	Rank
Halina Balon	Women's foil		1 Q		5	Did not advance			
Elżbieta Franke-Cymerman	Women's foil		2 Q		4	Did not advance			
Kamilla Składanowska	Women's foil		5	Did not advance					
Halina Balon; Kamilla Składanowska; Elżbieta Franke-Cymerman; Krystyna Machnicka-Urbańska; Jolanta Bebel-Rzymowska	Team foil	United States; W 8-8; Germany; L 8-8; Italy; L 10–3	3	Did not advance					7

== Football ==
=== First round ===
==== Group D ====
Team	Pld	W	D	L	GF	GA	GD	Pts
Poland	3	3	0	0	11	2	+9	6
East Germany	3	2	0	1	11	3	+8	4
Colombia	3	1	0	2	5	12	−7	2
Ghana	3	0	0	3	1	11	−10	0

August 28, 1972
12:00

Poland	5 – 1	Colombia
Deyna 16' 32'; Gadocha 42' 49' 72'	Report	Morón 63'

Ingolstadt
Attendance: 4.000
Referee: A. Salih Gindil (Sudan)

August 30, 1972
12:00

Poland	4 – 0	Ghana
Lubański 40'; Gadocha 59' 89'; Deyna 86'	Report

Regensburg
Attendance: 2.200
Referee: Kan-Chee Lee (Hong Kong)

September 1, 1972
12:00

Poland	2 – 1	East Germany
Gorgoń 6' 63'	Report	Streich 45'

Nuremberg
Attendance: 10.000
Referee: Werner Winsemann (Canada)

=== Second round ===
==== Group 2 ====
Team	Pld	W	D	L	GF	GA	GD	Pts
Poland	3	2	1	0	8	2	+6	5
Soviet Union	3	2	0	1	8	2	+6	4
Denmark	3	1	1	1	4	6	−2	3
Morocco	3	0	0	3	1	11	−10	0

September 3, 1972
12:00

Denmark	1 – 1	Poland
Heino Hansen 27'	Report	Deyna 36'

Regensburg
Attendance: 4.000
Referee: Abdelkader Aouissi (Algeria)

September 5, 1972
12:00

Soviet Union	1 – 2	Poland
Blokhin 28'	Report	Deyna 79' (pen.); Szołtysik 87'

Rosenaustadion, Augsburg
Attendance: 5.000
Referee: Henry Oberg (Norway)

September 8, 1972
12:00

Poland	5 – 0	Morocco
Kmiecik 3'; Lubański 10'; Deyna 45' (pen.) 63'; Gadocha 53'	Report

Nuremberg
Attendance: 500
Referee: Francesco Francescon (Italy)

=== Gold medal match ===
September 10, 1972

Poland	2 – 1	Hungary
Deyna 47' 68'	Report	Várady 42'

Olympic Stadium, Munich
Attendance: 80.000
Referee: Kurt Tschenscher (Germany)

=== Poland ===
Gold medal

- Zygmunt Anczok
- Lesław Ćmikiewicz
- Kazimierz Deyna
- Robert Gadocha
- Jerzy Gorgoń
- Zbigniew Gut
- Andrzej Jarosik
- Kazimierz Kmiecik
- Hubert Kostka
- Jerzy Kraska
- Grzegorz Lato
- Włodzimierz Lubański
- Joachim Marx
- Zygmunt Maszczyk
- Marian Ostafiński
- Marian Szeja
- Zygfryd Szołtysik
- Antoni Szymanowski
- Ryszard Szymczak

Head coach

- Kazimierz Górski

== Gymnastics ==
=== Artistic ===
Men

Athlete	Event	Qualification								Final							
Athlete	Event	Apparatus						Total	Rank	Apparatus						Total	Rank
Athlete	Event	F	PH	R	V	PB	HB	Total	Rank	F	PH	R	V	PB	HB	Total	Rank
Jerzy Kruża	All-around	17.75	17.60	17.55	18.00	17.65	17.80	106.35	50	Did not advance							
Mikołaj Kubica	All-around	18.20	18.55	18.50	18.75	18.85	18.40	111.25	13 Q	Did not finish							
Sylwester Kubica	All-around	19.00	18.30	18.80	18.40	18.50	17.75	110.75	17 Q	9.15	9.30	9.25	9.40	8.40	9.45	110.325	22
Wilhelm Kubica	All-around	18.35	18.70 Q	18.10	18.50	18.40	17.85	109.90	23 Q	9.10	9.40	9.35	9.00	9.40	9.30	110.550	20
Mieczysław Strzałka	All-around	17.65	18.05	17.90	18.30	16.65	17.90	106.45	48	Did not advance							
Andrzej Szajna	All-around	18.85	17.90	18.85	18.20	18.60	18.75	111.15	15 Q	9.25	8.75	9.00	9.50	9.35	9.55	110.975	15
Jerzy Kruża; Mikołaj Kubica; Sylwester Kubica; Wilhelm Kubica; Mieczysław Strzałka; Andrzej Szajna	Team all-around	92.20	91.50	92.15	92.30	92.00	90.95	551.10	4	—N/a							

Individual finals

Athlete	Event	Apparatus						Total	Rank
Athlete	Event	F	PH	R	V	PB	HB	Total	Rank
Wilhelm Kubica	Pommel horse	—N/a	18.750	—N/a				18.750	6

Women

Athlete	Event	Qualification						Final					
Athlete	Event	Apparatus				Total	Rank	Apparatus				Total	Rank
Athlete	Event	F	V	UB	BB	Total	Rank	F	V	UB	BB	Total	Rank
Małgorzata Barlak-Kamasińska	All-around	17.85	17.50	17.10	17.25	69.70	63	Did not advance					
Joanna Bartosz	All-around	18.45	17.55	18.15	16.60	70.75	52	Did not advance					
Danuta Fidusiewicz-Prusinowska	All-around	17.65	17.30	16.95	17.20	69.10	72	Did not advance					
Dorota Klencz	All-around	17.50	17.15	17.25	16.65	68.55	80	Did not advance					
Danuta Lubowska	All-around	17.60	17.70	16.75	16.30	68.35	84	Did not advance					
Łucja Matraszek-Chydzińska	All-around	18.05	18.00	18.50	16.60	71.15	45	Did not advance					
Małgorzata Barlak-Kamasińska; Joanna Bartosz; Danuta Fidusiewicz-Prusinowska; Dorota Klencz; Danuta Lubowska; Łucja Matraszek-Chydzińska	Team all-around	89.60	88.10	88.50	84.70	350.90	10	—N/a					

== Handball ==
Poland tied Sweden and defeated Denmark but lost to the Soviet Union in the first round to finish in third place in the division. This put the team into the ninth- to twelfth-place consolation round, where they defeated Iceland to set up a match with Norway for ninth and tenth places. Poland lost this match.

=== Preliminary round ===
==== Group A ====
Rank	Team	Pld	W	D	L	GF	GA	Pts	(Sweden)	(Soviet Union)	(Poland)	(Denmark)
1.	Sweden	3	1	2	0	40	34	4	X	11:11	13:13	16:10
2.	Soviet Union	3	1	2	0	40	34	4	11:11	X	17:11	12:12
3.	Poland	3	1	1	1	35	38	3	13:13	11:17	X	11:8
4.	Denmark	3	0	1	2	30	39	1	10:16	12:12	8:11	X

- Sweden tied Poland, 13–13
- Poland def. Denmark, 11–8
- Soviet Union def. Poland, 17–11

==== Classification 9-12 ====
- Poland def. Iceland, 20–17
- Norway def. Japan, 19–17

==== Classification 9/10 ====
- Norway def. Poland, 23–20

=== Poland ===
10th place

- Zdzisław Antczak
- Zbigniew Dybol
- Franciszek Gąsior
- Jan Gmyrek
- Bogdan Kowalczyk
- Zygfryd Kuchta
- Andrzej Lech
- Jerzy Melcer
- Helmut Pniocinski
- Wladyslaw Popielarski
- Hendryk Rozmiarek
- Andrzej Sokołowski
- Engelbert Szolc
- Andrzej Szymczak
- Wlodzimierz Wachowicz
- Robert Zawada

Head coach

- Janusz Czerwiński

== Hockey ==
Men's team competition

=== Preliminary round ===
==== Group B ====
Team	Pld	W	D	L	GF	GA	Pts
India	7	6	1	0	25	8	12
Netherlands	7	5	1	1	20	9	11
Great Britain	7	4	1	2	15	10	9
Australia	7	3	2	2	18	8	8
New Zealand	7	2	3	2	16	11	7
Poland	7	2	2	3	12	12	6
Kenya	7	1	1	5	8	17	3
Mexico	7	0	0	7	1	40	0

August 27, 1972

- Kenya – Poland 0-1 (0–1)

August 28, 1972

- Netherlands – Poland 4-2 (3–0)

August 30, 1972

- Poland – Mexico 3-0 (1–0)

August 31, 1972

- India – Poland 2-2 (1–0)

September 2, 1972

- New Zealand – Poland 3-3 (1–2)

September 3, 1972

- Australia – Poland 1-0 (1–0)

September 4, 1972

- Poland – Great Britain 1-2 (1-1)

=== Men's Classification Matches ===
September 8, 1972

- 11th/12th place: France – Poland 4-7 (2–1) after extra time

=== Poland ===
12th place

- Jerzy Choroba
- Aleksander Ciazynski
- Boleslaw Czainski
- Jerzy Czajka
- Henryk Grotowski
- Stanisław Iskrzynski
- Zbigniew Juszczak
- Stanisław Kasprzyk
- Stanisław Kazmierczak
- Marek Krus
- Zbigniew Loj
- Wlodzimierz Matuszynski
- Stefan Otulakowski
- Ryszard Twardowski
- Stanisław Wegnerski
- Aleksander Wrona
- Józef Wybieralski
- Witold Ziaja

Head coach

== Judo ==
Men

Athlete	Event	Round 1	Round 2	Round 3	Round 4	Repechage 1	Repechage 2	Repechage 3	Semifinal	Final / BM	
Athlete	Event	Opposition Result	Opposition Result	Opposition Result	Opposition Result	Opposition Result	Opposition Result	Opposition Result	Opposition Result	Opposition Result	Rank
Marian Tałaj	−63kg	Robin Moffitt (AUS); W 1000–0000	Stanko Topolčnik (YUG); W 1000–0000	Héctor Rodríguez (CUB); L 0000–0100	Did not advance						
Antoni Zajkowski	−70kg	Erwin García (NCA); W 1000–0000	Gustavo Brito (PUR); W 1000–0000	Patrick Vial (FRA); W 0001–0000	Toyokazu Nomura (JPN); L 0000–1000	—N/a	BYE	Antal Hetényi (HUN); W 0001–0000	Dietmar Hötger (GDR); W 0001–0000	Toyokazu Nomura (JPN); L 0000–1000	Silver medal
Adam Adamczyk	−80kg	BYE	Rick Littlewood (NZL); L 0001–1000	Did not advance							
Włodzimierz Lewin	−93kg	Patrick Murphy (IRL); W 0010–0000	Paul Barth (FRG); L 0001–0100	BYE		Helmut Howiller (GDR); L 0000–0100	Did not advance				
Waldemar Sikorski	+93kg	BYE	DNS	Did not advance							

== Modern pentathlon ==
Three male pentathletes represented Poland in 1972.

Athlete	Event	Shooting (10 m air pistol)	Fencing (épée one touch)	Swimming (200 m freestyle)	Riding (show jumping)	Running (3000 m)	Total points	Final rank
Athlete	Event	Points	Points	Points	Points	Points	Total points	Final rank
Janusz Pyciak-Peciak	Men's	1070	905	560	1060	1222	4832	21
Stanisław Skwira	Men's	785	791	846	1160	904	4495	40
Ryszard Wach	Men's	1100	715	956	1076	1126	4958	13
Janusz Pyciak-Peciak; Stanisław Skwira; Ryszard Wach	Team	2955	2420	2362	3296	3252	14785	8

Alternate Member:

- Krzysztof Trybusiewicz

== Rowing ==
Men

Athlete	Event	Heats		Repechage		Semifinal		Final	
Athlete	Event	Time	Rank	Time	Rank	Time	Rank	Time	Rank
Roman Kowalewski; Kazimierz Lewandowski	Double sculls	7:21.05	5 R	7:08.27	2 Q	7:59.52	6 FB	7:31.97	12
Jerzy Broniec; Alfons Ślusarski	Coxless pair	7:24.16	2 R	7:34.77	1 Q	7:42.41	1 Q	7:02.24	5
Wojciech Repsz; Wieslaw Dlugosz; Jacek Rylski	Coxed pair	7:57.23	2 R	8:10.87	2 Q	8:20.69	3 Q	7:28.92	6
Jerzy Ulczyński; Marian Siejkowski; Krzysztof Marek; Jan Młodzikowski; Grzegorz Stellak; Marian Drażdżewski; Ryszard Giło; Sławomir Maciejowski; Ryszard Kubiak	Eight	6:26.95	4 R	6:16.23	3 Q	6:31.10	3 Q	6:29.35	6

== Sailing ==
Open

Athlete	Event	Race							Net points	Final rank
Athlete	Event	1	2	3	4	5	6	7	Net points	Final rank
Blazej Wyszkowski	Finn	25	21	27	5	20	~~DNF~~	26	159.0	24
Zbigniew Kania; Krzysztof Szymczak	Flying Dutchman	7	18	13	18	22	23	~~DSQ~~	137.0	21
Tomasz Holc; Roman Rutkowski	Tempest	10	14	~~16~~	6	15	4	13	95.7	12
Zygfryd Perlicki; Józef Błaszczyk; Stanisław Stefański	Soling	~~19~~	14	5	9	5	14	—N/a	75.0	8
Lech Poklewski; Tadeusz Piotrowski; Aleksander Bielaczyc	Dragon	20	21	17	2	~~22~~	21	—N/a	106.0	20

== Shooting ==
Thirteen shooters, 12 men and one woman, represented Poland in 1972. Józef Zapędzki won gold in the 25 m rapid fire pistol.

Open

Athlete	Event	Final	
Athlete	Event	Score	Rank
Zygmunt Bogdziewicz	Running target	541	17
Zbigniew Fedyczak	50 m pistol	546	23
Zbigniew Fedyczak	25 m rapid fire pistol	587	14
Wiesław Gawlikowski	Skeet	185	39
Roman Kuzior	Running target	536	21
Eugeniusz Pędzisz	300 metre free rifle	1131	19
Eugeniusz Pędzisz	Men's 50 metre rifle three positions	1128	36
Artur Rogowski	Skeet	190	20
Eulalia Rolińska	50 metre rifle prone	593	28
Andrzej Sieledcow	300 metre free rifle	1135	16
Andrzej Sieledcow	50 metre rifle three positions	1151	6
Adam Smelczyński	Trap	190	11
Rajmund Stachurski	50 m pistol	559	4
Grzegorz Strouhal	Trap	179	35
Andrzej Trajda	50 metre rifle prone	597	9
Józef Zapędzki	25 m rapid fire pistol	595 OR	Gold medal

== Swimming ==
Men

Athlete	Event	Heat		Semifinal		Final	
Athlete	Event	Time	Rank	Time	Rank	Time	Rank
Andrzej Chudziński	100 metre butterfly	1:00.22	29	Did not advance			
Andrzej Chudziński	200 metre butterfly	2:12.62	25	Did not advance			
Piotr Dłucik	100 metre backstroke	1:01.94	25	Did not advance			
Zbigniew Pacelt	100 metre freestyle	55.97	36	Did not advance			
Zbigniew Pacelt	200 metre freestyle	2:01.28	33	Did not advance			
Zbigniew Pacelt	200 metre medley	2:17.35	26	Did not advance			
Zbigniew Pacelt	400 metre medley	4:55.38	25	Did not advance			
Cezary Śmiglak	100 metre breaststroke	1:10.53	33	Did not advance			
Cezary Śmiglak	200 metre breaststroke	2:34.51	30	Did not advance			
Władysław Wojtakajtis	400 metre freestyle	4:16.04	22	Did not advance			
Władysław Wojtakajtis	1500 metre freestyle	17:23.47	27	Did not advance			
Piotr Dłucik; Cezary Śmiglak; Andrzej Chudziński; Zbigniew Pacelt	4 x 200 metre freestyle	4:07.87	15	Did not advance			

== Volleyball ==
=== Preliminary round ===
Pool A

Pos	Team	Pld	W	L	Pts	SW	SL	SR	SPW	SPL	SPR	Qualification
1	Soviet Union	5	5	0	10	15	3	5.000	257	196	1.311	Semifinals
2	Bulgaria	5	4	1	9	13	8	1.625	294	235	1.251	Semifinals
3	Czechoslovakia	5	3	2	8	11	6	1.833	230	205	1.122	5th–8th semifinals
4	South Korea	5	2	3	7	7	10	0.700	209	197	1.061	5th–8th semifinals
5	Poland	5	1	4	6	8	12	0.667	237	259	0.915	9th place match
6	Tunisia	5	0	5	5	0	15	0.000	90	225	0.400	11th place match

Date		Score		Set 1	Set 2	Set 3	Set 4	Set 5	Total
27 Aug	Czechoslovakia	3–0	Poland	15–13	16–14	15–8			46–35
29 Aug	Poland	3–0	Tunisia	15–6	15–11	15–1			45–18
31 Aug	South Korea	3–1	Poland	15–7	13–15	15–11	15–6		58–39
02 Sep	Bulgaria	3–2	Poland	14–16	12–15	15–7	15–3	15–10	71–51
05 Sep	Soviet Union	3–2	Poland	11–15	15–12	15–12	10–15	15–13	66–67

=== 9th–10th places ===
==== 9th place match ====
Date		Score		Set 1	Set 2	Set 3	Set 4	Set 5	Total
09 Sep	Poland	3–0	Cuba	15–2	15–7	15–13			45–22

== Weightlifting ==
Men

Athlete	Event	Military press		Snatch		Clean & jerk		Total	Rank
Athlete	Event	Result	Rank	Result	Rank	Result	Rank	Total	Rank
Zygmunt Smalcerz	52 kg	112,5 OR	1	100	2	125	3	337,5 OR	Gold medal
Waldemar Korcz	52 kg	102,5	5	92,5	9	0	NVL	195	AC
Henryk Trębicki	56 kg	122.5	3	107.5	3	135	6	365	4
Grzegorz Cziura	56 kg	120	4	102.5	7	0	NVL	222,5	AC
Mieczysław Nowak	60 kg	120	8	110	8	145	6	375	7
Jan Wojnowski	60 kg	120	7	120	1	0	NVL	240	AC
Zbigniew Kaczmarek	67,5 kg	145	4	130	2	167,5	3	437,5	Bronze medal
Waldemar Baszanowski	67,5 kg	142,5	5	130	3	162,5	6	435	4
Norbert Ozimek	82.5 kg	165	4	145	4	187.5	2	497,5	Silver medal

== Wrestling ==
Men's freestyle

Athlete	Event	Elimination Pool						Final round	
Athlete	Event	Round 1 Result	Round 2 Result	Round 3 Result	Round 4 Result	Round 5 Result	Round 6 Result	Final round Result	Rank
Andrzej Kudelski	−52 kg	Wanelge Castillo (PAN); W T 8:57	Gordon Bertie (CAN); L P	Kiyomi Kato (JPN); L T 2:55	—N/a			Did not advance	11
Zbigniew Żedzicki	−57 kg	An Jea-Won (KOR); W P	Hideaki Yanagida (JPN); L P	Georgios Hatziioannidis (GRE); W T 1:16	Ivan Shavov (BUL); L T 1:23	—N/a		Did not advance	10
Zdzisław Stolarski	−62 kg	Satpal Singh (IND); L P	Orlando Gonçalves (POR); W T 5:27	Théodule Toulotte (FRA); L P	—N/a			Did not advance	11
Włodzimierz Cieślak	−68 kg	André Chardonnens (SUI); W P	Kikuo Wada (JPN); L P	Joseph Gilligan (GBR); W T 7:29	Stefanos Ioannidis (GRE); W P	Dan Gable (USA); L T 4:13	—N/a	Did not advance	7
Jan Wypiorczyk	−82 kg	Lupe Lara (CUB); W T 8:41	Ghulam Dastagir (AFG); W T 5:58	John Peterson (USA); L T 6:35	Peter Neumair (FRG); L P	—N/a		Did not advance	8
Paweł Kurczewski	−90 kg	Ben Peterson (USA); L P	George Saunders (CAN); W P	Raúl García (MEX); W P	Gennadi Strakhov (URS); L T 1:52	—N/a		Did not advance	9
Ryszard Długosz	−100 kg	Julio Tamussin (ITA); W P	József Csatári (HUN); L T 8:28	BYE	Vasil Todorov (BUL); L P	—N/a		Did not advance	6
Stanisław Makowiecki	+100 kg	Yorihide Isogai (JPN); W P	Ştefan Stîngu (ROU); L P	Moslem Eskandar-Filabi (IRN); L T 2:35	—N/a			Did not advance	8

Men's Greco-Roman

Athlete	Event	Elimination Pool						Final round	
Athlete	Event	Round 1 Result	Round 2 Result	Round 3 Result	Round 4 Result	Round 5 Result	Round 6 Result	Final round Result	Rank
Bernard Szczepański	−48 kg	Lorenzo Calafiore (ITA); L P	Sotirios Ventas (GRE); L T 1:32	—N/a				Did not advance	14
Jan Michalik	−52 kg	Pertti Ukkola (FIN); W P	BYE	Petar Kirov (BUL); L P	Miroslav Zeman (TCH); W P	Giuseppe Bognanni (ITA); L P	—N/a	Did not advance	5
Józef Lipień	−57 kg	Francesco Scuderi (ITA); W P	Chimedbazaryn Damdinsharav (MGL); W T 1:17	Rustam Kazakov (URS); L T 8:39	Hristo Traikov (BUL); L P	—N/a		Did not advance	8
Kazimierz Lipień	−62 kg	Théodule Toulotte (FRA); W T 8:34	László Réczi (HUN); W P	Stelios Mygiakis (GRE); W T 5:37	Slavko Koletić (YUG); W P	Heinz-Helmut Wehling (GDR); L T 7:00	—N/a	Hideo Fujimoto (JPN); W P	Bronze medal
Andrzej Supron	−68 kg	Simion Popescu (ROU); L T 5:58	Sotirios Nakos (GRE); W T 8:38	Mohammad Dalirian (IRI); W T 2:26	Shamil Khisamutdinov (URS); L T 8:10	—N/a		Did not advance	9
Stanisław Krzesiński	−74 kg	Werner Schröter (FRG); L P	Jiichiro Date (JPN); W P	Jan Karlsson (SWE); L T 8:47	—N/a			Did not advance	11
Adam Ostrowski	−82 kg	J Robinson (USA); W P	Ali Yağmur (TUR); W P	Csaba Hegedűs (SWE); L T 0:00	—N/a			Did not advance	9
Czesław Kwieciński	−90 kg	Lothar Metz (GDR); L P	Stoyan Ivanov (BUL); W P	Josip Čorak (YUG); L P	BYE	József Pércsi (HUN); W T 2:04	—N/a	Valeri Rezantsev (URS); L P	Bronze medal
Andrzej Skrzydlewski	−100 kg	Lorenz Hecher (FRG); W P	Burke Deadrich (USA); W T 1:23	Ferenc Kiss (HUN); L P	Nikolai Yakovenko (URS); L T 1:25	—N/a		Did not advance	7
Edward Wojda	+100 kg	Aleksandar Tomov (FRG); L T 5:59	Victor Dolipschi (ROU); L T 1:23	—N/a				Did not advance	8
