= List of Olympic female artistic gymnasts for Switzerland =

Gymnastics events have been staged at the Olympic Games since 1896, with women competing for the time at the 1928 Olympic Games. Switzerland has sent full teams of women artistic gymnasts to the 1972 and 1984 Olympic Games. Three-time Olympian Giulia Steingruber has represented Switzerland at the Olympics more than any other Swiss female gymnast.

== Gymnasts ==
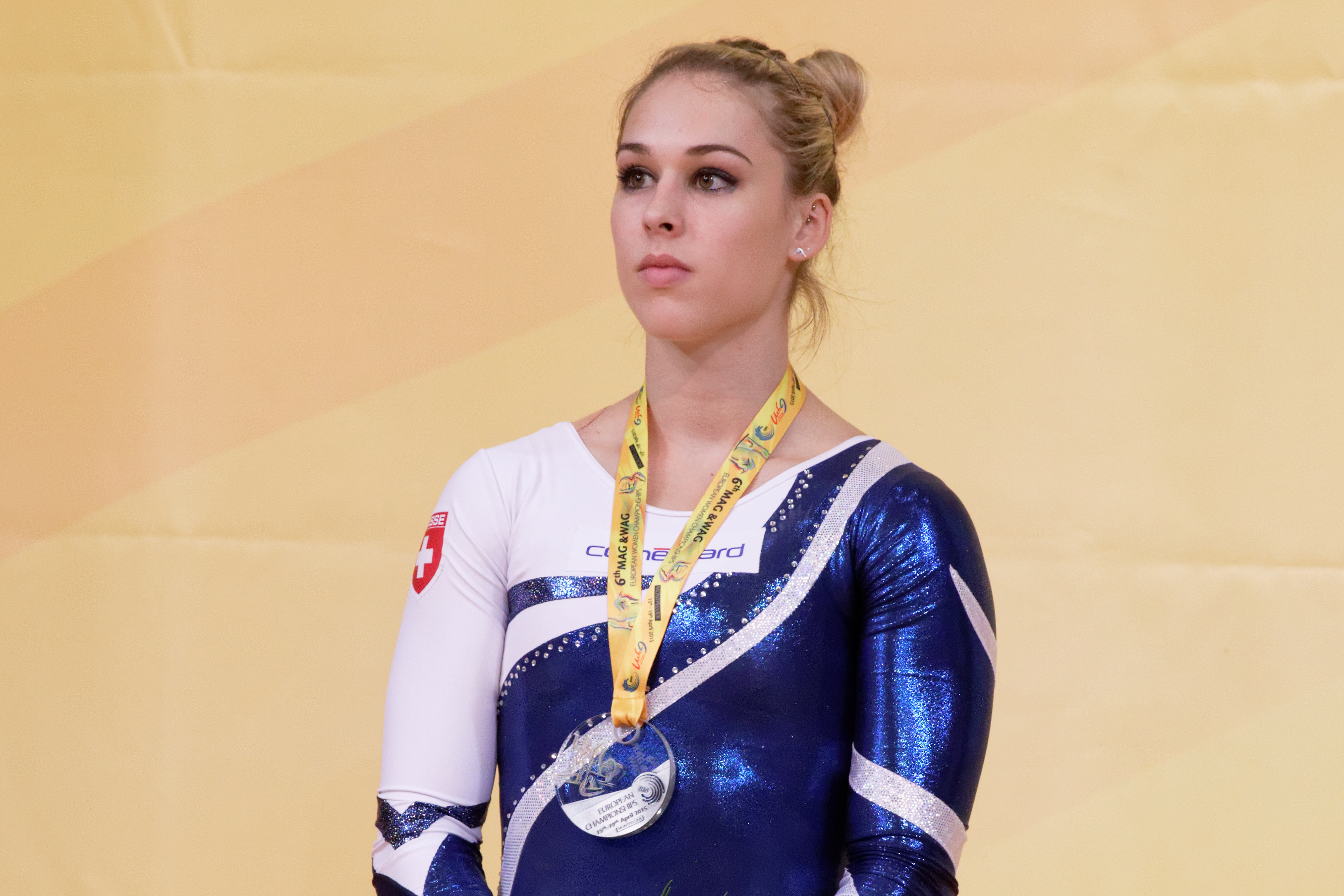
Giulia Steingruber in 2015

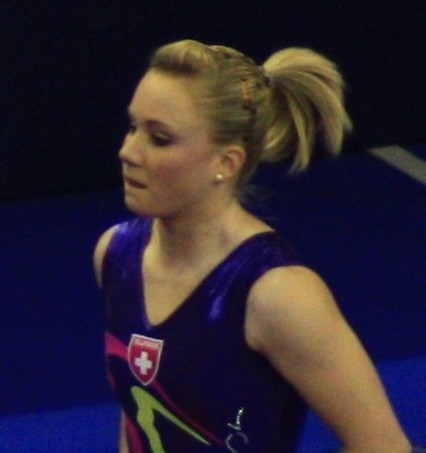
Ariella Käslin in 2009

Gymnast	Years	Ref.
Patrizia Bazzi	1972	
Monika Beer	1984	
Lena Bickel	2024	
Bettina Ernst	1984	
Käthi Fritschi	1972	
Pascale Grossenbacher	1996	
Marisa Jervella	1984	
Ariella Käslin	2008	
Romi Kessler	1984	
Susi Latanzio	1984	
Liselotte Marti	1972	
Natalie Seiler	1984	
Jacqueline Sievert	1972	
Christine Steger	1972	
Judith Steiger	1972	
Giulia Steingruber	2012, 2016, 2020	

== Medalists ==
Medal	Name	Year	Event
Bronze	Giulia Steingruber	(Brazil) 2016 Rio de Janeiro	Women's vault
