= List of Olympic female artistic gymnasts for Bulgaria =

Gymnastics events have been staged at the Olympic Games since 1896. Bulgarian female gymnasts have participated in every Summer Olympics since 1952, except for 2000 and 2016. A total of 50 female gymnasts have represented Bulgaria. Bulgarian women have won one medal at the Olympics – the 1988 floor exercise bronze, which was won by Diana Dudeva.

== Gymnasts ==
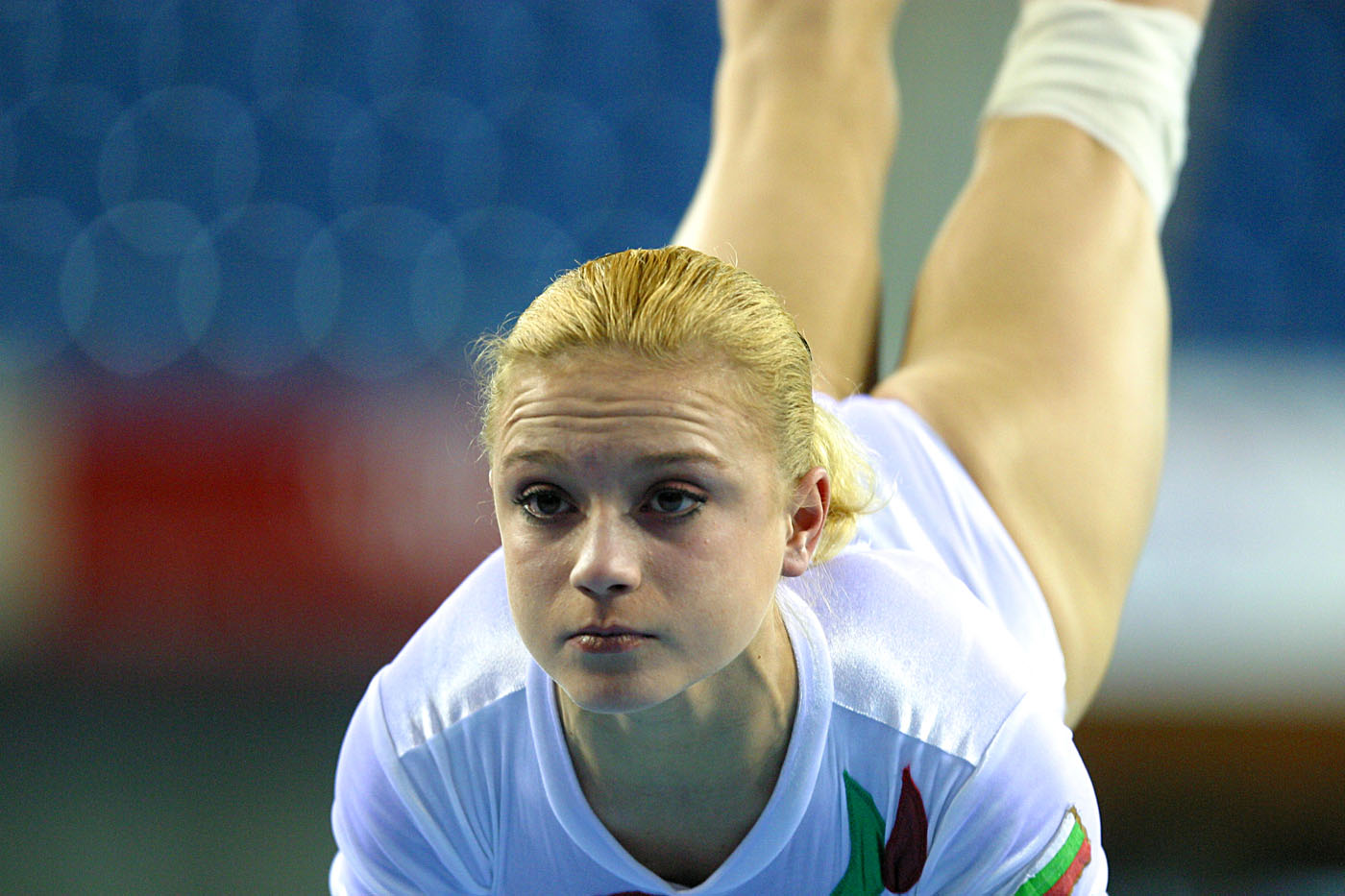
Evgeniya Kuznetsova

Gymnast	Years	Ref.
Liliyana Aleksandrova	1964	
Stoyanka Angelova	1952	
Rayna Atanasova	1968	
Maya Blagoeva	1972	
Ivanka Dolzheva	1952, 1956, 1960	
Diana Dudeva	1988	
Kameliya Eftimova	1980	
Dimitrinka Filipova	1980	
Veselina Gencheva	1996	
Elena Georgieva	1972	
Valentina Georgieva	2024	
Rayna Grigorova	1952, 1960, 1964	
Marieta Ilieva	1972	
Mariya Karashka	1968	
Mariya Kartalova	1988	
Svetla Kashtelyan	1976	
Irina Khitrova	1972	
Khrabrina Khrabrova	1988	
Snezhana Khristakieva	1992	
Mariya Kircheva	1976	
Nina Kostova	1976	
Evgeniya Kuznetsova	2004	
Galina Marinova	1980	
Vanya Marinova	1968	
Tanya Maslarska	1992	
Vesela Mateeva	1976	
Elisaveta Mileva	1960	
Ralitsa Mileva	2012	
Silviya Mitova	1992	
Kristina Panayotova	1992	
Evdokiya Pandezova	1972	
Vesela Pasheva	1968	
Stanka Pavlova	1960	
Penka Prisadashka	1952	
Antoaneta Rakhneva	1980	
Tsvetanka Rangelova	1960	
Ivelina Raykova	1988	
Nadya Shatarova	1976	
Saltirka Spasova-Tarpova	1952, 1956, 1960	
Tsvetanka Stancheva	1952, 1956	
Vasilka Stancheva	1952	
Boriana Stoyanova	1988	
Neli Stoyanova	1968	
Nikolina Tankucheva	2008	
Svetlana Todorova	1992	
Krasimira Toneva	1980	
Silviya Topalova	1980	
Reneta Tsvetkova	1972	
Delyana Vodenicharova	1988, 1992	
Galina Yaneva	1976	
Yordanka Yovkova	1952	

== Medalists ==
Medal	Name	Year	Event
Bronze	Diana Dudeva	(South Korea) 1988 Seoul	Women's floor exercise
