= Stefan Grodzicki =

Polish equestrian

Personal information
- Nationality: Polish
- Born: 4 August 1947; Złotoryja, Poland
- Died: 30 September 1976 (aged 29); Bartoszyce, Poland

Sport
- Sport: Equestrian

Stefan Grodzicki (4 August 1947 – 30 September 1976) was a Polish equestrian. He competed in two events at the 1972 Summer Olympics in Munich, Germany. In the final standings of team mixed equestrianism eventing, Poland finished 10th of the 18 competing countries, 281.60 points behind the winner, Great Britain.
