= Ralitsa Mileva =

Bulgarian artistic gymnast

- Full name: Ralitsa Todorova Mileva
- Born: 22 December 1993 (age 32) Sofia, Bulgaria
- Height: 1.67 m (5 ft 6 in)

Gymnastics career
- Discipline: Women's artistic gymnastics
- Country represented: Bulgaria (2009–2017)
- Club: CSKA Sofia
- Retired: 2017

Ralitsa Todorova Mileva (Bulgarian: Ралица Тодорова Милева; born 22 December 1993) is a Bulgarian former artistic gymnast that represented Bulgaria at the 2012 Summer Olympics.

== Gymnastics career ==
Mileva competed at her first World Championships in 2009, where she finished fifty-sixth in the all-around during the qualification round. She then went to the 2010 European Championships and finished thirty-second in the all-around qualification. She also competed at the 2010 World Championships and finished 114th in the all-around qualifications. At the 2011 World Championships in Tokyo, she finished 124th in the all-around qualifications.

Mileva competed at the 2012 Olympic Test Event where she qualified for an individual spot for the 2012 Olympics. She then competed at the 2012 European Championships where she finished thirtieth in the all-around qualification. She then represented Bulgaria at the 2012 Summer Olympics.

Mileva continued competing after the Olympics and went to the 2013 European Championships in Moscow, where she finished forty-first in the all-around. She then competed at the 2014 European Championships in her hometown, Sofia, where she finished thirty-fifth in the all-around in qualifications. Then at the 2014 World Championships where she finished 142nd in the qualification round.

At the 2015 European Championships, Mileva finished fiftieth in the all-around during the qualifications. She then went to the 2015 Varna Challenge Cup where she finished eighth in the balance beam final. She then represented Bulgaria at the 2015 European Games alongside Albena Zlatkova and Valentina Rashkova, and they finished twenty-fifth in the team competition. She won the bronze medal in the all-around at the 2015 Bosphorus Tournament in Istanbul.

Mileva's final competition was the 2017 Varna Challenge Cup, but she did not qualify for any event finals.

== See also ==
- List of Olympic female artistic gymnasts for Bulgaria
