= Piotr Dłucik =

Polish swimmer

Personal information
- Born: 20 April 1954 (age 72) Stalinogród, Polish People's Republic

Sport
- Sport: Swimming

Piotr Dłucik (born 20 April 1954) is a Polish former backstroke swimmer. He competed in two events at the 1972 Summer Olympics.
