= Marian Ostafiński =

Polish footballer

Personal information
- Full name: Marian Wiesław Ostafiński
- Date of birth: 8 December 1946 (age 79)
- Place of birth: Przemyśl, Poland
- Height: 1.84 m (6 ft 0 in)
- Position: Defender

Youth career
- –1964: Polonia Przemyśl

Senior career*
Years	Team	Apps	(Gls)
1965–1967	Bieszczady Rzeszów		
1967–1969	Stal Stalowa Wola		
1969–1972	Stal Rzeszów	67	(0)
1972–1977	Ruch Chorzów	115	(6)
1977	SC Hazebrouck		
1977	Polonia Bytom	8	(1)
1977–1978	SC Hazebrouck		
1978–1980	Polonia Bytom	21	(0)

International career
1971–1975	Poland	11	(0)
Medal record
Men's football
Representing Poland
Olympic Games
Gold medal – first place	1972 Munich	Team
- * Club domestic league appearances and goals

Marian Wiesław Ostafiński (born 8 December 1946) is a Polish former footballer who played as a defender.

At international level, he made 11 appearances for the Poland national team and was a participant at the 1972 Summer Olympics, where his team won the gold medal.

== Honours ==
Ruch Chorzów

- Ekstraklasa: 1973–74, 1974–75
- Polish Cup: 1973–74

Poland

- Olympic gold medal: 1972
