= Antonina Koshel =

Soviet artistic gymnast

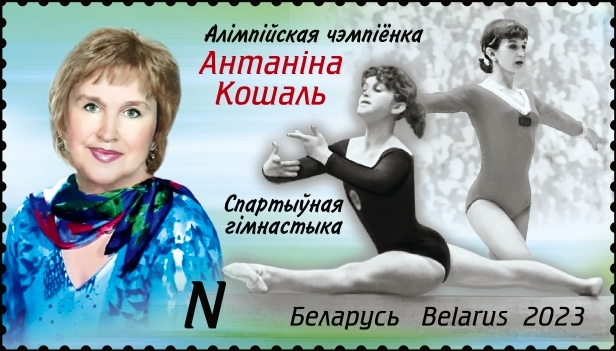
- Koshel on a 2023 stamp of Belarus

Personal information
- Full name: Antonina Vladimirovna Koshel
- Born: 20 November 1954 (age 71) Smalyavichy, Byelorussian SSR, Soviet Union
- Height: 1.54 m (5 ft 1 in)

Gymnastics career
- Discipline: Women's artistic gymnastics
- Country represented: Soviet Union
- Club: Trudovye Rezervy Minsk
- Retired: 1974
Medal record
Representing Soviet Union
Olympic Games
Gold medal – first place	1972 Munich	Team

Antonina Vladimirovna Koshel (Russian: Антонина Владимировна Кошель, Belarusian: Антаніна Уладзіміраўна Кошаль; born 20 November 1954) is a retired Soviet artistic gymnast. She competed at the 1972 Summer Olympics in all artistic gymnastics events and won a gold medal in the team allround competition. Individually her best achievement was 12th place on the balance beam and vault.

Koshel began gymnastics after following her older sister, Natalia, into the gym. However, Koshel preferred ballet over gymnastics, but she was not accepted into a local ballet school. After that, she moved to the Minsk sports boarding school to train in gymnastics. She returned to Smalyavichy when her family had trouble paying for the school. However, her coach Viktor Khomutov persuaded Koshel's parents to let her stay in Minsk. She caught the eye of the national team coaches after winning the all-around competition at the 1970 All-Union Youth Championships. She was invited to join the national team after the 1971 Riga International.

Out of the twenty-four possible choices, Koshel was one of the seven women chosen to represent the Soviet Union at the 1972 Summer Olympics in Munich. The Soviet Union won the team gold medal. Koshel qualified twentieth into the all-around final with a score of 73.000, and she finished sixteenth in the final with a total of 74.200.

Koshel retired from gymnastics in 1974, and she now works as a coach in Minsk. She is now married and has two daughters.
