= Andrzej Chudziński =

Polish swimmer (1948–1985)

Personal information
- Born: 17 September 1948 Gdynia, Poland
- Died: 4 September 1985 (aged 36) Puławy, Polish People's Republic

Sport
- Sport: Swimming

Andrzej Chudziński (17 September 1948 – 4 September 1985) was a butterfly Polish swimmer. He competed in three events at the 1972 Summer Olympics.
