= Kayoko Hashiguchi-Saka =

Japanese gymnast

- 坂 佳代子
- Born: 26 April 1944 (age 82) Miyazaki, Miyazaki, Japan

Gymnastics career
- Discipline: Women's artistic gymnastics
- Country represented: Japan

Kayoko Saka, née Hashiguchi, (坂 佳代子; born 26 April 1944) is a Japanese former artistic gymnast. She won gold in the team event at the 1967 Summer Universiade, and she competed at the 1968 Summer Olympics and the 1972 Summer Olympics. She has since worked as a professor at Nippon Sport Science University and the Kyushu University of Medical Science and as a coach. She is also a former governor of Miyazaki Prefecture.

== Career ==
Saka competed at the 1967 Summer Universiade, where she finished 6th in the all-around. The Japanese team won gold in the team event. In October, she competed at the 1968 Summer Olympics test event, where she placed 19th.

The next year, at the Olympics, she finished in 33rd place individual and 4th in the team event.

In 1970, she competed at the World Championships and placed 14th.

At the 1972 Summer Olympics, she finished 40th in the all-around qualifying and did not advance to the final. The Japanese team placed 7th.

== Post-gymnastics career ==
Saka served as a judge at the 1996 Summer Olympics.

In September 2005, Saka was nominated for vice-governor of her native Miyazaki Prefecture by the governor, Tadayasu Ando. She was appointed in October. Ando resigned in December 2006, and Saka became the prefecture's acting governor the next day.

She became a professor at Nippon Sport Science University in 1994, then later at the Kyushu University of Medical Science. In 2022, she became a professor emeritus.

She has worked as a coach and served as a director at the Japan Gymnastics Association. She received an award for her coaching from the Japan Sports Association in 2013.

== Personal life ==
Saka was born in Miyazaki. She enrolled in Nippon Sport Science University in 1963.

She enjoys ikebana, stating that she enjoys the stillness of the art as a contrast to the movement of gymnastics.
