= Ingrid Santer =

German gymnast

Personal information
- Nationality: German
- Born: 9 June 1955 (age 70) Munich, Germany

Sport
- Sport: Gymnastics

Ingrid Santer (born 9 June 1955) is a German gymnast. She competed at the 1972 Summer Olympics.
