= Patricia Ollinger =

Mexican gymnast (born 1953)

Personal information
- Nationality: Mexican
- Born: 9 September 1953 (age 71)

Sport
- Sport: Gymnastics

Patricia Ollinger (born 9 September 1953) is a Mexican gymnast. She competed at the 1972 Summer Olympics.
