= Nancy Thies =

American gymnast

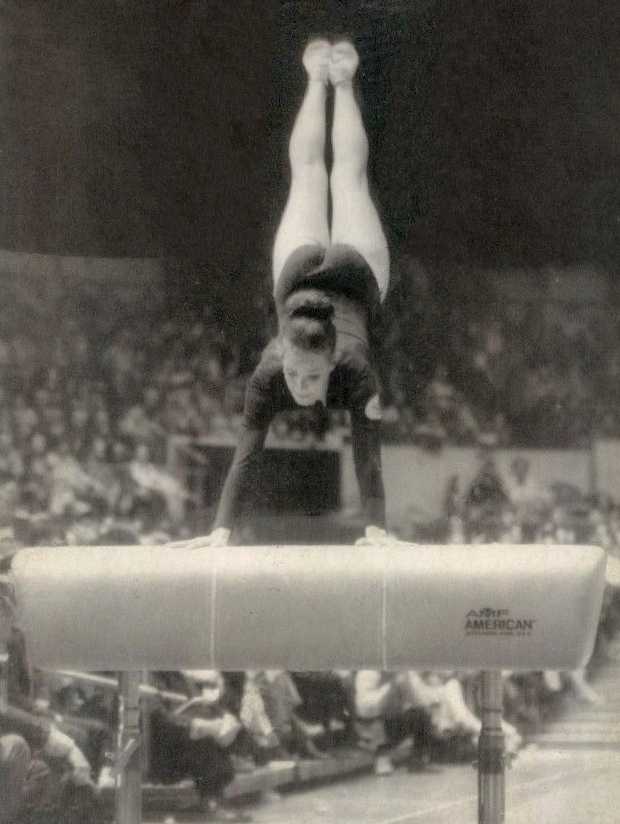
- Thies in 1973

Personal information
- Nationality: American
- Born: June 10, 1957 (age 69) Denver, Colorado, U.S.
- Education: Urbana High School; University of Illinois
- Height: 161 cm (5 ft 3 in)
- Weight: 49 kg (108 lb)

Sport
- Sport: Artistic gymnastics
- Club: McKinley Young Men's Christian Association

Nancy Lynn Thies (born June 10, 1957) is a retired American gymnast. Aged 15, she competed in six events at the 1972 Summer Olympics with the best individual result of 27th place on the balance beam.

Thies finished third all-around at the 1972 AAU Meet and fifth at the 1972 U.S. Olympic Trials. After graduating from the University of Illinois she became an author and journalist, working in public relations. She also served as vice-chair for women at USA Gymnastics, headed the USA Gymnastics athlete wellness program, and occasionally acted as a commentator for gymnastics-related TV broadcasts.
