= Sharon Tsukamoto =

Canadian gymnast

Personal information
- Born: 10 August 1953 (age 72) Toronto, Ontario, Canada

Sport
- Sport: Gymnastics

Sharon Tsukamoto (born 10 August 1953) is a Canadian gymnast. She competed at the 1972 Summer Olympics.
