= Marie Lundqvist-Björk =

Swedish gymnast

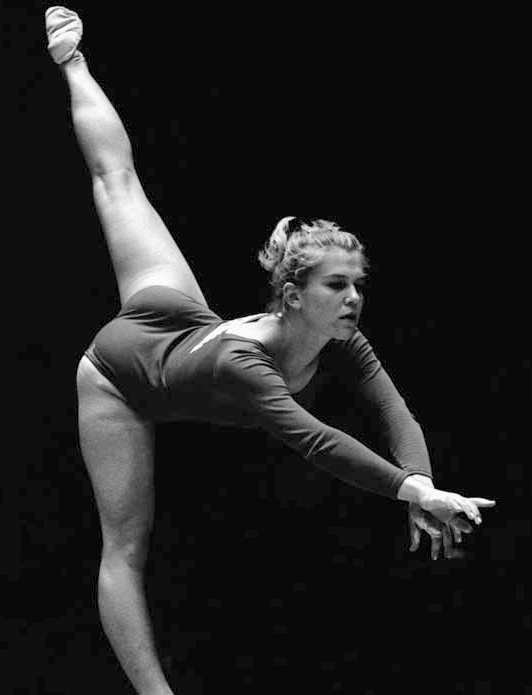
- Lundqvist-Björk at the 1964 Olympics

Personal information
- Nationality: Swedish
- Born: 21 February 1947 (age 78); Västerås, Sweden
- Height: 166 cm (5 ft 5 in)
- Weight: 58 kg (128 lb)

Sport
- Sport: Artistic gymnastics
- Club: Västerås GF

Anna Marie Lundqvist-Björk (born 21 February 1947) is a retired Swedish gymnast. She competed at the 1964, 1968 and 1972 Summer Olympics with the best individual result of 29th place on the floor in 1964.
