= María Antonieta Hernández =

Mexican gymnast (born 1958)

Personal information
- Nationality: Mexican
- Born: 25 March 1958 (age 67)

Sport
- Sport: Gymnastics

María Antonieta Hernández (born 25 March 1958) is a Mexican gymnast. She competed at the 1972 Summer Olympics.
