= Ulrike Weyh =

German gymnast

Personal information
- Nationality: German
- Born: 1 August 1957 (age 67); Itzehoe, West Germany

Sport
- Sport: Gymnastics

Ulrike Weyh (born 1 August 1957) is a German former gymnast. She competed at the 1972 Summer Olympics.
