= Unni Holmen =

Norwegian artistic gymnast

Personal information
- Nationality: Norwegian
- Born: 23 September 1952 (age 72); Oslo, Norway

Sport
- Country: Norway
- Sport: Gymnastics

Unni Holmen (born 23 September 1952) is a Norwegian artistic gymnast.

She was born in Oslo. She competed at the 1968 Summer Olympics and the 1972 Summer Olympics.

Holmen won individual Nordic titles in 1971, 1975 and 1977. From 1984 to 1995 she coached the Norwegian national team in artistic gymnastics.
