= Nevenka Puškarević =

Yugoslav gymnast (born 1952)

Nevenka Selak
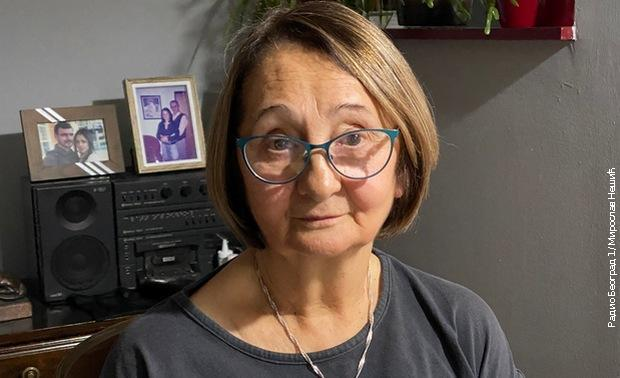
- Nevenka Selak

Personal information
- Nationality: Yugoslav, Serbian
- Born: 3 April 1952 (age 74) Sombor, SFR Yugoslavia

Sport
- Sport: Gymnastics

Nevenka Selak (born Nevenka Puškarević, 3 April 1952) is a Yugoslav and Serbian gymnast.

As a member of the Sombor Gymnastics Club, she became a multiple champion of Yugoslavia, Serbia, and Vojvodina. Selak consistently achieved top results in individual events, as well. She represented Yugoslavia at international competitions from the age of 16 to 21.

She placed 10th at the 1970 World Artistic Gymnastics Championships in Ljubljana. Additionally, she competed at the 1972 Summer Olympics in Munich.

She was born and still lives in Sombor.
