= Patricia García (gymnast) =

Mexican gymnast (born 1957)

Personal information
- Nationality: Mexican
- Born: 18 January 1957 (age 69)

Sport
- Sport: Gymnastics

Patricia García (born 18 January 1957) is a Mexican gymnast. She competed at the 1972 Summer Olympics and the 1976 Summer Olympics.
