= Teresa McDonnell =

Canadian gymnast

Personal information
- Born: 8 December 1953 (age 71) Toronto, Ontario, Canada

Sport
- Sport: Gymnastics

Teresa McDonnell (born 8 December 1953) is a Canadian gymnast. She competed at the 1968 Summer Olympics, the 1972 Summer Olympics and the 1976 Summer Olympics.
