= Sidsel Ekholdt =

Norwegian artistic gymnast (born 1956)

Personal information
- Nationality: Norwegian
- Born: 10 March 1956 (age 70) Øvre Eiker, Norway

Sport
- Country: Norway
- Sport: Gymnastics

Sidsel Ekholdt (born 10 March 1956) is a retired Norwegian artistic gymnast.

She was born in Øvre Eiker. She competed at the 1972 Summer Olympics.
