= Monica Stefani =

Italian gymnast

Personal information
- Nationality: Italian
- Born: 17 November 1957 (age 67); Lucca, Italy

Sport
- Sport: Gymnastics

Monica Stefani (born 17 November 1957) is an Italian gymnast. She competed at the 1972 Summer Olympics.
