= Anikó Kéry =

Hungarian artistic gymnast

Personal information
- Born: 31 March 1956 (age 70) Budapest, Hungary
- Height: 1.57 m (5 ft 2 in)
- Weight: 51 kg (112 lb)

Sport
- Sport: Artistic gymnastics
- Club: Központi Sportiskola Sportegyesület
Medal record
Representing Hungary
Olympic Games
Bronze medal – third place	1972 Munich	Team

Anikó Kéry (born 31 March 1956) is a retired Hungarian gymnast. She competed at the 1972 Summer Olympics in all artistic gymnastics events and won a bronze medal in the team competition. Her best individual result was 13th place in the uneven bars.

After retiring from competitions she toured around the world with an acrobatic show, together with her husband Attila Kapros. In 1983 she gave birth to their only child, Anikó Kapros, a professional tennis player coached by her husband.
