= Slaviča Kundačina =

Yugoslav gymnast (born 1955)

Personal information
- Nationality: Yugoslav
- Born: 26 April 1955 (age 69)

Sport
- Sport: Gymnastics

Slaviča Kundačina (born 26 April 1955) is a Yugoslav gymnast. She competed at the 1972 Summer Olympics.
