= Gro Sandberg =

Norwegian artistic gymnast

Personal information
- Nationality: Norwegian
- Born: 25 April 1956 (age 68); Hokksund, Norway

Sport
- Country: Norway
- Sport: Gymnastics

Gro Sandberg (born 25 April 1956) is a Norwegian artistic gymnast.

She was born in Hokksund. She competed at the 1972 Summer Olympics.
