= Maria Grazia Mancuso =

Italian gymnast

Personal information
- Nationality: Italian
- Born: 19 August 1956; Venice, Italy
- Died: 25 September 2014 (aged 58)

Sport
- Sport: Gymnastics

Maria Grazia Mancuso (19 August 1956 – 25 September 2014) was an Italian gymnast. She competed at the 1972 Summer Olympics.
