= Ilona Békési =

Hungarian artistic gymnast

Personal information
- Born: 11 December 1953 (age 72) Budapest, Hungary
- Height: 1.66 m (5 ft 5 in)
- Weight: 55 kg (121 lb)

Sport
- Sport: Artistic gymnastics
- Club: Vasas, Budapest
Medal record
Representing Hungary
Olympic Games
| Bronze medal – third place | 1972 Munich | Team |

Ilona Békési (born 11 December 1953) is a retired Hungarian gymnast. She competed at the 1968 and 1972 Summer Olympics in all artistic gymnastics events and finished in fifth and third place in the team competition, respectively. Her best individual result was fifth place on the uneven bars in 1972.
