= Susan Buchanan =

Canadian gymnast

Personal information
- Born: 6 January 1952 (age 73) Ottawa, Ontario, Canada

Sport
- Sport: Gymnastics

Susan Buchanan (born 6 January 1952) is a Canadian gymnast. She competed at the 1972 Summer Olympics.
