= Ana María Casas =

Mexican gymnast (born 1955)

Personal information
- Nationality: Mexican
- Born: 24 September 1955 (age 70)

Sport
- Sport: Gymnastics

Ana María Casas (born 24 September 1955) is a Mexican gymnast. She competed at the 1972 Summer Olympics.She helped her team placed 19th in the Team All-Around.
