= Hilda Amézaga =

Mexican gymnast (born 1954)

Personal information
- Full name: Hilda Amézaga Harfuch
- Nationality: Mexican
- Born: 30 April 1954 (age 70)

Sport
- Sport: Gymnastics

Hilda Amézaga Harfuch (born 30 April 1954) is a Mexican gymnast who competed at the 1972 Summer Olympics. She represented her country, alongside her twin sister Elsa, from 1970 to 1977.

She lives in Boca del Río, Veracruz, where she runs her own gym.
