= Ikina Morsch =

Dutch gymnast

Personal information
- Nationality: Dutch
- Born: 5 July 1956 (age 68); Heiloo, Netherlands

Sport
- Sport: Gymnastics

Ikina Morsch (born 5 July 1956) is a Dutch former gymnast. She competed at the 1972 Summer Olympics.
