= Pepita Sánchez =

Spanish gymnast

Personal information
- Nationality: Spanish
- Born: 5 May 1952 (age 72); Barcelona, Spain

Sport
- Sport: Gymnastics

Pepita Sánchez Soler (born 5 May 1952) is a Spanish gymnast. She competed at the 1972 Summer Olympics.
