= Olga Bumbić =

Yugoslav gymnast (born 1946)

Personal information
- Nationality: Yugoslav
- Born: 4 September 1946 (age 78)

Sport
- Sport: Gymnastics

Olga Bumbić (born 4 September 1946) is a Serbian Yugoslav gymnast. She competed at the 1972 Summer Olympics, where she won a bronze medal.
