= Jennifer Diachun =

Canadian gymnast

Personal information
- Born: 14 August 1953 (age 73) Toronto, Ontario, Canada

Sport
- Sport: Gymnastics

Jennifer Diachun (born 14 August 1953) is a Canadian gymnast. She competed at the 1968 Summer Olympics and the 1972 Summer Olympics.
