= Nel van der Voort =

Dutch gymnast

Personal information
- Nationality: Dutch
- Born: 11 October 1951 (age 73); Amsterdam, Netherlands

Sport
- Sport: Gymnastics

Nel van der Voort (born 11 October 1951) is a Dutch gymnast. She competed at the 1972 Summer Olympics.
