= Cinzia Delisi =

Italian gymnast

Personal information
- Nationality: Italian
- Born: 27 October 1956 (age 68); São Paulo, Brazil

Sport
- Sport: Gymnastics

Cinzia Delisi (born 27 October 1956) is an Italian gymnast. She competed at the 1972 Summer Olympics.
