= Marija Težak =

Slovenian gymnast (born 1957)

Personal information
- Nationality: Slovenian
- Born: 1 June 1957 (age 69) Ljubljana, Yugoslavia

Sport
- Sport: Gymnastics

Marija Težak (born 1 June 1957) is a former Slovenian-Yugoslavian gymnast. She competed at the 1972 Summer Olympics.
