= Linda Toorop =

Dutch gymnast

Personal information
- Nationality: Dutch
- Born: 12 September 1955 (age 69); Sorong, Indonesia

Sport
- Sport: Gymnastics

Linda Toorop (born 12 September 1955) is a Dutch gymnast. She competed at the 1972 Summer Olympics.
