= Jenny Sunderland =

Australian gymnast

Personal information
- Nationality: Australian
- Born: 13 March 1954}
- Died: Busselton, Western Australia 29 January 2025 (aged 70)

Sport
- Sport: Gymnastics

Jennifer "Jenny" Lee Couch (nee Sunderland) (13 March 1954 - 29 January 2025) was an Australian gymnast. She competed at the 1972 Summer Olympics.

As a nine-year-old she joined the Swan Girls Gymnastics Club and this led to her competing at the Australian Gymnastics Championships at the age of twelve. She represented Australia at the 1970 Artistic Gymnastics World Championships in Yugoslavia. She was the only Australian female gymnast at the 1972 Munich Olympic Games.

She founded the Busselton Gymnastics Club. In 2025, she was awarded life Membership of Gymnastics WA.

She died from motor neurone disease.

Her nephew, Scott Sunderland, competed in cycling at the 2012 London Olympics.
