= Erna Havelka =

Croatian gymnast (born 1944)

Personal information
- Nationality: Croatian
- Born: 19 September 1944 (age 80); Zagreb, Croatia

Sport
- Sport: Gymnastics

Erna Havelka (born 19 September 1944) is a former Croatian-Yugoslavian gymnast. She competed at the 1972 Summer Olympics.
