= Andrea Niederheide =

German gymnast

Personal information
- Nationality: German
- Born: 2 November 1957 (age 67); Hattingen, Germany

Sport
- Sport: Gymnastics

Andrea Niederheide (born 2 November 1957) is a German former gymnast. She competed at the 1972 Summer Olympics.
