= Toshiko Miyamoto =

Japanese gymnast (born 1954)

Personal information
- Nationality: Japanese
- Born: 4 January 1954 (age 71)

Sport
- Sport: Gymnastics

Toshiko Miyamoto (宮本 敏子, Miyamoto Toshiko, born 4 January 1954) is a Japanese gymnast. She competed at the 1972 Summer Olympics.
