= Bente Hansen (gymnast) =

Norwegian gymnast

Personal information
- Nationality: Norwegian
- Born: 22 August 1953 (age 71); Oslo, Norway

Sport
- Sport: Gymnastics

Bente Hansen (born 22 August 1953) is a Norwegian gymnast. She competed at the 1972 Summer Olympics.
