= Trine Andresen =

Norwegian artistic gymnast

Personal information
- Nationality: Norwegian
- Born: 28 November 1955 (age 69); Oslo, Norway

Sport
- Country: Norway
- Sport: Gymnastics

Trine Helene Andresen-Svendheim (born 28 November 1955) is a Norwegian artistic gymnast.

She was born in Oslo. She competed at the 1972 Summer Olympics.
