= Margo Velema =

Dutch gymnast

Personal information
- Nationality: Dutch
- Born: 21 October 1955 (age 69); Eindhoven, Netherlands

Sport
- Sport: Gymnastics

Margo Velema (born 21 October 1955) is a Dutch gymnast. She competed at the 1972 Summer Olympics.
