= Jutta Oltersdorf =

German gymnast

Personal information
- Nationality: German
- Born: 17 April 1956 (age 68); Köndringen, Germany

Sport
- Sport: Gymnastics

Jutta Oltersdorf (born 17 April 1956) is a German gymnast. She competed at the 1972 Summer Olympics and the 1976 Summer Olympics.
