= Márta Kelemen =

Hungarian artistic gymnast

Personal information
- Born: 17 September 1954 (age 72) Budapest, Hungary
- Height: 1.64 m (5 ft 5 in)
- Weight: 52 kg (115 lb)

Sport
- Sport: Artistic gymnastics
- Club: Központi Sportiskola; Budapesti Honvéd Sportegyesület
Medal record
Representing Hungary
Olympic Games
Bronze medal – third place	1972 Munich	Team

Márta Kelemen (born 17 September 1954) is a retired Hungarian gymnast. She competed at the 1972 and 1976 Summer Olympics in all artistic gymnastics events and finished in third and fourth place in the team competition, respectively. Her best individual result was ninth place in the uneven bars in 1972.
