= Takako Hasegawa =

Japanese gymnast (born 1951)

Personal information
- Nationality: Japanese
- Born: 1 January 1951 (age 74)

Sport
- Sport: Gymnastics

Takako Hasegawa (長谷川たか子, Hasegawa Takako, born 1 January 1951) is a Japanese gymnast. She competed at the 1972 Summer Olympics where she finished thirty-fifth in the individual all around.
