= Judith Steiger =

Swiss gymnast

Personal information
- Nationality: Swiss
- Born: 27 October 1956 (age 68)

Sport
- Sport: Gymnastics

Judith Steiger (born 27 October 1956) is a Swiss gymnast. She competed at the 1972 Summer Olympics.
