= Danuta Lubowska =

Polish gymnast

Personal information
- Nationality: Polish
- Born: 21 May 1956 (age 68); Zabrze, Poland

Sport
- Sport: Gymnastics

Danuta Lubowska (born 21 May 1956) is a Polish gymnast. She competed at the 1972 Summer Olympics.
