= Maya Blagoeva =

Bulgarian artistic gymnast (born 1956)

Personal information
- Born: 25 July 1956 (age 69) Bulgaria
- Height: 151 cm (4 ft 11 in)
- Weight: 42 kg (93 lb)

Sport
- Sport: Artistic gymnastics
- Club: Slavia, Sofia

Maya Blagoeva (later Mitova, Bulgarian: Мая Благоева; born 25 July 1956) is a retired Bulgarian artistic gymnast. A seven-time national champion, she competed at the 1972 Summer Olympics .

Blagoeva has a bachelor's degree in physical education. She is married to the Olympic gymnastics coach Zarko Mitov and has a long coaching experience herself. She brought three gymnasts to the international and Olympic level, including her daughter Silvia Mitova. In the 1990s her family moved to the United States, where she works at the Silvia’s Gymnastics gym in Pennsylvania, together with her husband, daughter and son-in-law.
