= Christine Schmitt =

East German gymnast

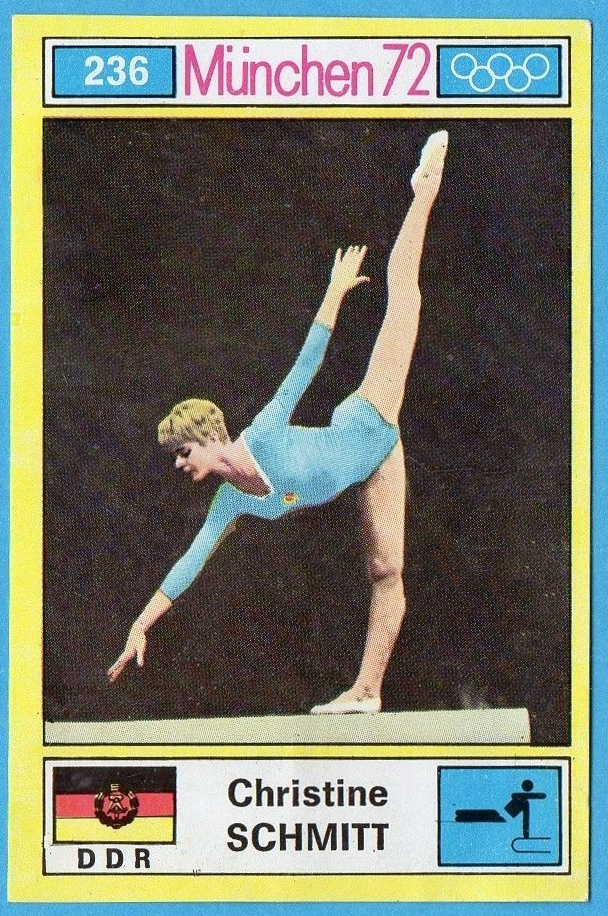
- Christine Schmitt in 1972

Personal information
- Born: 26 May 1953 (age 73) Rostock, East Germany
- Height: 1.72 m (5 ft 8 in)

Gymnastics career
- Discipline: Women's artistic gymnastics
- Club: SC Empor Rostock
Medal record
Representing East Germany
Olympic Games
Silver medal – second place	1972 Munich	Team
World Championships
Silver medal – second place	1970 Ljubljana	Team

Christine Schmitt (later Christine Dressel; born 26 May 1953) is a retired German gymnast. She competed at the 1972 Summer Olympics in all artistic gymnastics events and won a silver medal in the team competition. Her best individual result was 11th place in the vault. She won another silver medal with the East German team at the 1970 World Artistic Gymnastics Championships.
