= Patrizia Bazzi =

Swiss gymnast

Personal information
- Nationality: Swiss
- Born: 21 August 1957 (age 67)

Sport
- Sport: Gymnastics

Patrizia Bazzi (born 21 August 1957) is a Swiss gymnast. She competed at the 1972 Summer Olympics.
