= Elena Georgieva (gymnast) =

Bulgarian gymnast (born 1947)

Personal information
- Nationality: Bulgarian
- Born: 26 January 1947 (age 79) Godech, Bulgaria

Sport
- Sport: Gymnastics

Elena Georgieva (Bulgarian: Елена Георгиева) (born 26 January 1947) is a Bulgarian former gymnast. She competed at the 1972 Summer Olympics.
