= Dorota Klencz =

Polish gymnast

Personal information
- Full name: Dorota Monika Klencz
- Nationality: Polish
- Born: 19 July 1955 (age 69); Zabrze, Poland

Sport
- Sport: Gymnastics

Dorota Monika Klencz (born 19 July 1955) is a Polish gymnast. She competed at the 1972 Summer Olympics.
