= Evdokiya Pandezova =

Bulgarian gymnast (born 1947)

Personal information
- Nationality: Bulgarian
- Born: 31 December 1947 (age 77); Plovdiv, Bulgaria

Sport
- Sport: Gymnastics

Evdokiya Pandezova (Bulgarian: Евдокия Пандезова) (born 31 December 1947) is a Bulgarian gymnast. She competed at the 1972 Summer Olympics.
