= Jacqueline Sievert =

Swiss gymnast

Personal information
- Nationality: Swiss
- Born: 18 August 1956 (age 68)

Sport
- Sport: Gymnastics

Jacqueline Sievert (born 18 August 1956) is a Swiss gymnast. She competed at the 1972 Summer Olympics.
