= Zdenka Bujnáčková =

Slovak gymnast (born 1955)

Personal information
- Nationality: Slovak
- Born: 25 April 1955 (age 69); Bratislava, Czechoslovakia

Sport
- Sport: Gymnastics

Zdenka Bujnáčková (born 25 April 1955) is a Slovak gymnast. She competed at the 1972 Summer Olympics.
