= Danuta Fidusiewicz-Prusinowska =

Polish gymnast

Personal information
- Nationality: Polish
- Born: 27 July 1952 (age 72); Olsztyn, Poland

Sport
- Sport: Gymnastics

Danuta Fidusiewicz-Prusinowska (born 27 July 1952) is a Polish gymnast. She competed at the 1972 Summer Olympics.
