= Joan Moore (gymnast) =

American gymnast

Personal information
- Nationality: American
- Born: August 14, 1954 (age 70); Philadelphia, Pennsylvania, United States

Sport
- Sport: Gymnastics

Joan Moore (born August 14, 1954) is an American gymnast. She competed in six events at the 1972 Summer Olympics.

== Competitive history ==
| Year | Event | Team | AA | VT | UB | BB | FX |
Junior
| 1964 | JO Development Championships | | | | | | 2nd place, silver medalist(s) |
| 1968 | AAU JO Nationals | | 2nd place, silver medalist(s) | | | | |
Senior
| 1970 | AAU Championships | | 7 | | | | |
| 1970 | Manitoba World Invitational | 2nd place, silver medalist(s) | 4 | | 4 | | 2nd place, silver medalist(s) |
| 1970 | World Championships | 7 | 33 | | | | |
| 1971 | Riga International | | 6 | 6 | | 6 | 8 |
| 1971 | USA-USSR Dual Meet | 2nd place, silver medalist(s) | 5 | | | | |
| 1971 | USGF Championships | | 1st place, gold medalist(s) | 1st place, gold medalist(s) | 1st place, gold medalist(s) | 2nd place, silver medalist(s) | 1st place, gold medalist(s) |
| 1972 | Chunichi Cup | | 4 | | | | |
| 1972 | Tokyo Cup | | 3rd place, bronze medalist(s) | | | | |
| 1972 | USA-JPN Dual Meet | | | | 3rd place, bronze medalist(s) | | 1st place, gold medalist(s) |
| 1972 | USGF Championships | | 1st place, gold medalist(s) | | 3rd place, bronze medalist(s) | 2nd place, silver medalist(s) | 1st place, gold medalist(s) |
| 1972 | Olympic Games | 4 | 21 | | | | |
| 1973 | AAU Championships | | 1st place, gold medalist(s) | | | | |
| 1973 | Chunichi Cup | | 10 | | | | |
| 1973 | USGF Championships | | 1st place, gold medalist(s) | 2nd place, silver medalist(s) | 3rd place, bronze medalist(s) | 3rd place, bronze medalist(s) | 1st place, gold medalist(s) |
| 1974 | 2nd Elite Qualifier | | 1st place, gold medalist(s) | | | | |
| 1974 | AAU Championships | | 1st place, gold medalist(s) | 3rd place, bronze medalist(s) | 1st place, gold medalist(s) | | 1st place, gold medalist(s) |
| 1974 | USA-CSSR Dual Meet | | 3rd place, bronze medalist(s) | | | | |
| 1974 | USGF Championships | | 1st place, gold medalist(s) | | | 1st place, gold medalist(s) | 1st place, gold medalist(s) |
| 1974 | World Trials | | 3rd place, bronze medalist(s) | | | | |
| 1974 | World Championships | 7 | 18 | | | | |
