= Zdena Dorňáková =

Czech gymnast

Personal information
- Nationality: Czech
- Born: 25 June 1957 (age 67); Valašské Meziříčí, Czechoslovakia

Sport
- Sport: Gymnastics

Zdena Dorňáková (born 25 June 1957) is a Czech gymnast. She competed in six events at the 1972 Summer Olympics.
