= Marieta Ilieva =

Bulgarian gymnast (born 1955)

Personal information
- Nationality: Bulgarian
- Born: 13 December 1955 (age 69); Stara Zagora, Bulgaria

Sport
- Sport: Gymnastics

Marieta Ilieva (Bulgarian: Мариета Илиева) (born 13 December 1955) is a Bulgarian gymnast. She competed at the 1972 Summer Olympics.
