= Uta Schorn =

German gymnast

Personal information
- Nationality: German
- Born: 7 August 1957 (age 69) Cologne, West Germany

Sport
- Sport: Gymnastics

Uta Schorn (German pronunciation: [ˈʊta ʃɔʁn]; born 7 August 1957) is a German gymnast. She competed at the 1972 Summer Olympics and the 1976 Summer Olympics.
