= Soňa Brázdová =

Czech gymnast

Personal information
- Nationality: Czech
- Born: 17 February 1953 (age 72); Zlín, Czechoslovakia

Sport
- Sport: Gymnastics

Soňa Brázdová (born 17 February 1953) is a Czech gymnast. She competed in six events at the 1972 Summer Olympics.
