= Małgorzata Barlak-Kamasińska =

Polish gymnast

Personal information
- Nationality: Polish
- Born: 7 July 1952 (age 72); Katowice, Poland

Sport
- Sport: Gymnastics

Małgorzata Barlak-Kamasińska (born 7 July 1952) is a Polish gymnast. She competed at the 1972 Summer Olympics.
