= Irina Khitrova =

Bulgarian gymnast (born 1953)

Personal information
- Nationality: Bulgarian
- Born: 29 October 1953 (age 71); Ivaylovgrad, Bulgaria

Sport
- Sport: Gymnastics

Irina Khitrova (born 29 October 1953) is a Bulgarian former gymnast. She competed at the 1972 Summer Olympics.
