= Reneta Tsvetkova =

Bulgarian gymnast (born 1957)

Personal information
- Nationality: Bulgarian
- Born: 19 November 1957 (age 67); Ruse, Bulgaria

Sport
- Sport: Gymnastics

Reneta Tsvetkova (Bulgarian: Ренета Цветкова) (born 19 November 1957) is a Bulgarian former gymnast. She competed at the 1972 Summer Olympics.
