= Liselotte Marti =

Swiss gymnast

Personal information
- Nationality: Swiss
- Born: 25 May 1956 Herisau, Switzerland
- Died: 16 June 2014 (aged 58) Sankt Gallen, Switzerland

Sport
- Sport: Gymnastics

Liselotte Marti (25 May 1956 – 16 June 2014) was a Swiss gymnast. She competed at the 1972 Summer Olympics.
