= Ans van Gerwen =

Dutch artistic gymnast

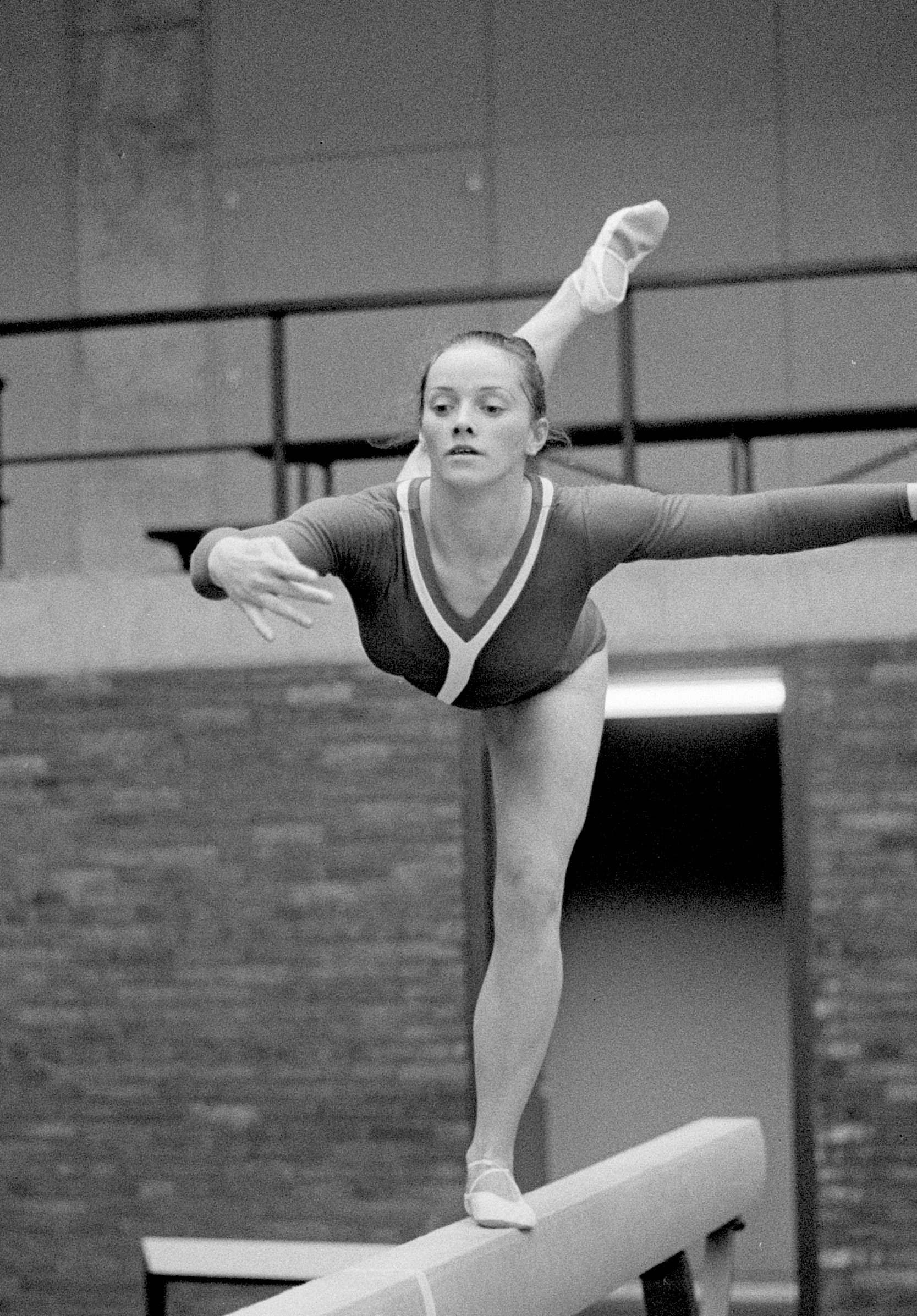
- Ans van Gerwen in 1975

Personal information
- Born: 17 January 1951 (age 75) Eindhoven, Netherlands
- Height: 1.61 m (5 ft 3 in)
- Weight: 57 kg (126 lb)

Sport
- Sport: Artistic gymnastics
- Club: PSV, Eindhoven

Anna Maria "Ans" van Gerwen (born 17 January 1951) is a former artistic gymnast from the Netherlands who competed at the 1972 and 1976 Summer Olympics in all artistic gymnastics events. Her best achievements were 9th and 19th place in the team and individual all-around events in 1972, which was the best performance among West European female gymnasts at those games.

She has a degree in physiotherapy. After marrying Cor Smulders, a fellow artistic gymnast, she changed her last name from van Gerwen to Smulders. They worked as gymnastic coaches and till 2006 had a restaurant in Aarle-Rixtel. They have four children.
