= Joanna Bartosz =

Polish gymnast

Personal information
- Nationality: Polish
- Born: 14 February 1954 (age 71); Olsztyn, Poland

Sport
- Sport: Gymnastics

Joanna Bartosz (born 14 February 1954) is a Polish gymnast. She competed at the 1972 Summer Olympics.
