= Christine Steger =

Swiss gymnast

Personal information
- Nationality: Swiss
- Born: 18 December 1957 (age 67)

Sport
- Sport: Gymnastics

Christine Steger (born 18 December 1957) is a Swiss gymnast. She competed at the 1972 Summer Olympics.
