= Käthi Fritschi =

Swiss gymnast

Personal information
- Nationality: Swiss
- Born: 18 August 1954 (age 70)

Sport
- Sport: Gymnastics

Käthi Fritschi (born 18 August 1954) is a Swiss gymnast. She competed at the 1972 Summer Olympics.
