= East Germany at the World Artistic Gymnastics Championships =

- Flag of East Germany
- IOC code: GDR
- Medals: Gold 17 Silver 13 Bronze 29 Total 59

East Germany first competed as its own team at the World Championships in 1958 where the men's and women's teams both placed ninth. The men would win their first team medal, a bronze, in 1966. The women would win their first team medal, a silver, at the following iteration of the World Championships in 1970. In 1989 East and West Germany were reunified; therefore in 1991 they began competing as a unified German team.

== Medalists ==
| Medal | Name | Year | Event |
|---|---|---|---|
| Bronze | Matthias Brehme, Gerhard Dietrich, Werner Dolling, Erwin Koppe, Siegfried Fülle, Peter Weber | (West Germany) 1966 Dortmund | Men's team |
| Silver | Erika Zuchold | (West Germany) 1966 Dortmund | Women's vault |
| Bronze | Matthias Brehme, Klaus Köste, Wolfgang Thüne, Gerhard Dietrich, Peter Kunze, Bernd Schiller | (Socialist Federal Republic of Yugoslavia) 1970 Ljubljana | Men's team |
| Silver | Angelika Hellmann, Karin Janz, Marianne Noack, Richarda Schmeißer, Christine Schmitt, Erika Zuchold | (Socialist Federal Republic of Yugoslavia) 1970 Ljubljana | Women's team |
| Silver | Erika Zuchold | (Socialist Federal Republic of Yugoslavia) 1970 Ljubljana | Women's all-around |
| Gold | Erika Zuchold | (Socialist Federal Republic of Yugoslavia) 1970 Ljubljana | Women's vault |
| Silver | Karin Janz | (Socialist Federal Republic of Yugoslavia) 1970 Ljubljana | Women's vault |
| Gold | Karin Janz | (Socialist Federal Republic of Yugoslavia) 1970 Ljubljana | Women's uneven bars |
| Gold | Erika Zuchold | (Socialist Federal Republic of Yugoslavia) 1970 Ljubljana | Women's balance beam |
| Bronze | Christine Schmitt | (Socialist Federal Republic of Yugoslavia) 1970 Ljubljana | Women's balance beam |
| Bronze | Klaus Köste | (Socialist Federal Republic of Yugoslavia) 1970 Ljubljana | Men's horizontal bar |
| Bronze | Wolfgang Thüne, Bernd Jäger, Wolfgang Klotz, Rainer Hanschke, Lutz Mack, Olaf Grosse | (Bulgaria) 1974 Varna | Men's team |
| Silver | Angelika Hellmann, Annelore Zinke, Richarda Schmeißer, Bärbel Röhrich, Heike Gerisch, Irene Abel | (Bulgaria) 1974 Varna | Women's team |
| Bronze | Angelika Hellmann | (Bulgaria) 1974 Varna | Women's all-around |
| Gold | Annelore Zinke | (Bulgaria) 1974 Varna | Women's uneven bars |
| Silver | Wolfgang Thüne | (Bulgaria) 1974 Varna | Men's horizontal bar |
| Bronze | Ralph Bärthel, Roland Brückner, Ralf-Peter Hemmann, Lutz Mack, Michael Nikolay, Reinhard Rückriem | (France) 1978 Strasbourg | Men's team |
| Bronze | Steffi Kräker, Silvia Hindorff, Birgit Süß, Heike Kuhardt, Karola Sube, Ute Wittwer | (France) 1978 Strasbourg | Women's team |
| Bronze | Steffi Kräker | (France) 1978 Strasbourg | Women's vault |
| Bronze | Ralph Bärthel | (France) 1978 Strasbourg | Men's vault |
| Bronze | Maxi Gnauck, Regina Grabolle, Silvia Hindorff, Steffi Kräker, Katharina Rensch, Karola Sube | (United States) 1979 Fort Worth | Women's team |
| Silver | Maxi Gnauck | (United States) 1979 Fort Worth | Women's all-around |
| Gold | Roland Brückner | (United States) 1979 Fort Worth | Men's floor exercise |
| Bronze | Steffi Kräker | (United States) 1979 Fort Worth | Women's vault |
| Gold | Maxi Gnauck | (United States) 1979 Fort Worth | Women's uneven bars |
| Bronze | Ralph Bärthel | (United States) 1979 Fort Worth | Men's vault |
| Bronze | Regina Grabolle | (United States) 1979 Fort Worth | Women's balance beam |
| Bronze | Steffi Kräker, Annett Lindner, Birgit Senff, Kerstin Jacobs, Franka Voigt, Maxi Gnauck | (Soviet Union) 1981 Moscow | Women's team |
| Gold | Maxi Gnauck | (Soviet Union) 1981 Moscow | Women's vault |
| Bronze | Steffi Kräker | (Soviet Union) 1981 Moscow | Women's vault |
| Gold | Michael Nikolay | (Soviet Union) 1981 Moscow | Men's pommel horse |
| Gold | Maxi Gnauck | (Soviet Union) 1981 Moscow | Women's uneven bars |
| Gold | Ralf-Peter Hemman | (Soviet Union) 1981 Moscow | Men's vault |
| Gold | Maxi Gnauck | (Soviet Union) 1981 Moscow | Women's balance beam |
| Bronze | Maxi Gnauck, Gabriele Fähnrich, Astrid Heese, Diana Morawe, Silvia Rau, Bettina Schieferdecker | (Hungary) 1983 Budapest | Women's team |
| Gold | Maxi Gnauck | (Hungary) 1983 Budapest | Women's uneven bars |
| Bronze | Bernd Jensch | (Hungary) 1983 Budapest | Men's vault |
| Bronze | Sylvio Kroll, Holger Behrendt, Ulf Hoffmann, Jorg Hasse, Sven Tippelt, Holger Zeig | (Canada) 1985 Montreal | Men's team |
| Bronze | Gabriele Fähnrich, Jana Fuhrmann, Martina Jentsch, Dagmar Kersten, Ulrike Klotz, Jana Vogel | (Canada) 1985 Montreal | Women's team |
| Bronze | Sylvio Kroll | (Canada) 1985 Montreal | Men's all-around |
| Bronze | Dagmar Kersten | (Canada) 1985 Montreal | Women's all-around |
| Bronze | Dagmar Kersten | (Canada) 1985 Montreal | Women's vault |
| Gold | Gabriele Fähnrich | (Canada) 1985 Montreal | Women's uneven bars |
| Silver | Dagmar Kersten | (Canada) 1985 Montreal | Women's uneven bars |
| Gold | Sylvio Kroll | (Canada) 1985 Montreal | Men's parallel bars |
| Bronze | Ulrike Klotz | (Canada) 1985 Montreal | Women's floor exercise |
| Silver | Sylvio Kroll | (Canada) 1985 Montreal | Men's horizontal bar |
| Bronze | Sylvio Kroll, Sven Tippelt, Holger Behrendt, Ulf Hoffmann, Maik Belle, Mario Reichert | (Netherlands) 1987 Rotterdam | Men's team |
| Bronze | Dörte Thümmler, Ulrike Klotz, Martina Jentsch, Klaudia Rapp, Astrid Heese, Gabriele Fähnrich | (Netherlands) 1987 Rotterdam | Women's team |
| Gold | Dörte Thümmler | (Netherlands) 1987 Rotterdam | Women's uneven bars |
| Gold | Sylvio Kroll | (Netherlands) 1987 Rotterdam | Men's vault |
| Bronze | Sven Tippelt | (Netherlands) 1987 Rotterdam | Men's parallel bars |
| Bronze | Holger Behrendt | (Netherlands) 1987 Rotterdam | Men's horizontal bar |
| Silver | Andreas Wecker, Sven Tippelt, Sylvio Kroll, Jörg Behrend, Jens Milbradt, Enrico Ambros | (West Germany) 1989 Stuttgart | Men's team |
| Silver | Andreas Wecker | (West Germany) 1989 Stuttgart | Men's pommel horse |
| Silver | Andreas Wecker | (West Germany) 1989 Stuttgart | Men's rings |
| Gold | Jörg Behrend | (West Germany) 1989 Stuttgart | Men's vault |
| Silver | Sylvio Kroll | (West Germany) 1989 Stuttgart | Men's vault |
| Bronze | Andreas Wecker | (West Germany) 1989 Stuttgart | Men's parallel bars |

== Medal tables ==
=== By gender ===
| Gender | Gold | Silver | Bronze | Total |
|---|---|---|---|---|
| Women | 11 | 7 | 15 | 33 |
| Men | 6 | 6 | 14 | 26 |

=== By event ===
| Event | Gold | Silver | Bronze | Total |
|---|---|---|---|---|
| Women's uneven bars | 7 | 1 | 0 | 8 |
| Men's vault | 3 | 1 | 3 | 7 |
| Women's vault | 2 | 2 | 4 | 8 |
| Women's balance beam | 2 | 0 | 2 | 4 |
| Men's pommel horse | 1 | 1 | 0 | 2 |
| Men's parallel bars | 1 | 0 | 2 | 3 |
| Men's floor exercise | 1 | 0 | 0 | 1 |
| Women's team | 0 | 2 | 6 | 8 |
| Men's horizontal bar | 0 | 2 | 2 | 4 |
| Women's individual all-around | 0 | 2 | 2 | 4 |
| Men's team | 0 | 1 | 6 | 7 |
| Men's rings | 0 | 1 | 0 | 1 |
| Men's individual all-around | 0 | 0 | 1 | 1 |
| Women's floor exercise | 0 | 0 | 1 | 1 |

== See also ==
- East Germany men's national artistic gymnastics team
- East Germany women's national artistic gymnastics team
- Germany at the World Artistic Gymnastics Championships
