= East Germany women's national artistic gymnastics team =

National sports team

East Germany
- Continental union: European Union of Gymnastics

Olympic Games
- Appearances: 5
- Medals: Silver: 1972; Bronze: 1968, 1976, 1980, 1988

World Championships
- Medals: Silver: 1970 1974; Bronze: 1978, 1979, 1981, 1983, 1985, 1987

The East Germany women's national artistic gymnastics team represented East Germany in FIG international competitions.

== History ==
Shortly after World War II Germany was split into East Germany and West Germany. For many years East and West Germany had competed as a Unified Team. East Germany made their World Championships debut in 1962 and their Olympic debut in 1968.

== Team competition results ==
=== Olympic Games ===
- 1968 — Bronze medal
  Maritta Bauerschmidt, Karin Janz, Marianne Noack, Magdalena Schmidt, Ute Starke, Erika Zuchold
- 1972 — Silver medal
  Irene Abel, Angelika Hellmann, Karin Janz, Richarda Schmeisser, Christine Schmitt, Erika Zuchold
- 1976 – Bronze medal
  Carola Dombeck, Gitta Escher, Kerstin Gerschau, Angelika Hellmann, Marion Kische, Steffi Kräker
- 1980 – Bronze medal
  Maxi Gnauck, Silvia Hindorff, Steffi Kräker, Katharina Rensch, Karola Sube, Birgit Süss
- 1984 – did not participate due to boycott
- 1988 – Bronze medal
  Gabriele Fähnrich, Martina Jentsch, Dagmar Kersten, Ulrike Klotz, Bettina Schieferdecker, Dörte Thümmler

=== World Championships ===
- 1962 – 5th place
- 1966 – 4th place
- 1970 – silver medal
  Angelika Hellmann, Karin Janz, Marianne Noack, Richarda Schmeißer, Christine Schmitt, Erika Zuchold
- 1974 – silver medal
  Angelika Hellmann, Annelore Zinke, Richarda Schmeißer, Bärbel Röhrich, Heike Gerisch, Irene Abel
- 1978 – bronze medal
  Steffi Kräker, Silvia Hindorff, Birgit Süß, Heike Kuhardt, Karola Sube, Ute Wittwer
- 1979 – bronze medal
  Maxi Gnauck, Regina Grabolle, Silvia Hindorff, Steffi Kräker, Katharina Rensch, Karola Sube
- 1981 – bronze medal
  Steffi Kräker, Annett Lindner, Birgit Senff, Kerstin Jacobs, Franka Voigt, Maxi Gnauck
- 1983 – bronze medal
  Maxi Gnauck, Gabriele Fähnrich, Astrid Heese, Diana Morawe, Silvia Rau, Bettina Schieferdecker
- 1985 – bronze medal
  Gabriele Fähnrich, Jana Fuhrmann, Martina Jentsch, Dagmar Kersten, Ulrike Klotz, Jana Vogel
- 1987 – bronze medal
  Dörte Thümmler, Ulrike Klotz, Martina Jentsch, Klaudia Rapp, Astrid Heese, Gabriele Fähnrich

== Most decorated gymnasts ==
This list includes all East German female artistic gymnasts who have won at least four medals at the Olympic Games and the World Artistic Gymnastics Championships combined. This list does not includes medals won as a unified Germany. Also not included are medals won at the 1984 Friendship Games (alternative Olympics).

Rank	Gymnast	Team	AA	VT	UB	BB	FX	Olympic Total	World Total	Total
1	Maxi Gnauck	1980; 1979; 1981; 1983	1980; 1979	1981	1980; 1979; 1981	1981; 1983	1980	4	9	13
2	Karin Büttner-Janz	1972; 1968; 1970	1972	1972; 1970	1972; 1968; 1970	1972		7	3	10
3	Erika Zuchold	1972; 1968; 1970	1970	1968; 1972; 1970; 1966	1972	1970		5	5	10
4	Steffi Kräker	1976; 1980; 1978; 1979; 1981		1980; 1978; 1979; 1981	1980			4	6	10
5	Dagmar Kersten	1988; 1985	1985	1985	1988; 1985			2	4	6
6	Gabriele Fähnrich	1988; 1983; 1985; 1987			1985			1	4	5
7	Angelika Hellmann	1972; 1976; 1970; 1974	1974					2	3	5
8	Ulrike Klotz	1988; 1985; 1987					1985	1	3	4

== Hall of Famers ==
The following East German gymnasts have been inducted into the International Gymnastics Hall of Fame:

- Maxi Gnauck (2000)
- Karin Büttner-Janz (2003)
- Erika Zuchold (2005)
- Steffi Kräker (2011)

== See also ==
- East Germany men's national artistic gymnastics team
