= East Germany men's national artistic gymnastics team =

National sports team

East Germany
- Continental union: European Union of Gymnastics

Olympic Games
- Appearances: 5
- Medals: Silver: 1980, 1988; Bronze: 1968, 1972, 1976

World Championships
- Medals: Silver: 1989; Bronze: 1966, 1970, 1974, 1978, 1985, 1987

The East Germany men's national artistic gymnastics team represented East Germany in FIG international competitions.

== History ==
Shortly after World War II Germany was split into East Germany and West Germany. For many years East and West Germany had competed as a Unified Team. East Germany made their World Championships debut in 1962 and their Olympic debut in 1968. They won an Olympic team medal at every Olympic Games they participated in, with their best team finishes being silver in 1980 and 1988.

== Team competition results ==
=== Olympic Games ===
Year	Position	Squad
1968	bronze medal	Günter Beier, Matthias Brehme, Gerhard Dietrich, Siegfried Fülle, Klaus Köste, Peter Weber
1972	bronze medal	Matthias Brehme, Wolfgang Klotz, Klaus Köste, Jürgen Paeke, Reinhard Rychly, Wolfgang Thüne
1976	bronze medal	Roland Brückner, Rainer Hanschke, Bernd Jäger, Wolfgang Klotz, Lutz Mack, Michael Nikolay
1980	silver medal	Andreas Bronst, Roland Brückner, Ralf-Peter Hemmann, Lutz Hoffmann, Lutz Mack, Michael Nikolay
1984	boycotted	—N/a
1988	silver medal	Holger Behrendt, Ralf Büchner, Ulf Hoffmann, Sylvio Kroll, Sven Tippelt, Andreas Wecker

=== World Championships ===
Year	Position	Squad
1962	8th place	Werner Dolling, Siegfried Fülle, Erwin Koppe, Klaus Köste, Frank Tippelt, Peter Weber
1966	bronze medal	Matthias Brehme, Gerhard Dietrich, Werner Dolling, Erwin Koppe, Siegfried Fülle, Peter Weber
1970	bronze medal	Matthias Brehme, Klaus Köste, Wolfgang Thüne, Gerhard Dietrich, Peter Kunze, Bernd Schiller
1974	bronze medal	Wolfgang Thüne, Bernd Jäger, Wolfgang Klotz, Rainer Hanschke, Lutz Mack, Olaf Grosse
1978	bronze medal	Ralph Bärthel, Roland Brückner, Ralf-Peter Hemmann, Lutz Mack, Michael Nikolay, Reinhard Rückriem
1979	4th place	Ralph Bärthel, Andreas Bronst, Roland Brückner, Lutz Hoffmann, Lutz Mack, Michael Nikolay
1981	4th place	Andreas Bronst, Roland Brückner, Ralf-Peter Hemmann, Bernd Jensch, Jürgen Nikolay, Michael Nikolay
1985	bronze medal	Sylvio Kroll, Holger Behrendt, Ulf Hoffmann, Jorg Hasse, Sven Tippelt, Holger Zeig
1987	bronze medal	Sylvio Kroll, Sven Tippelt, Holger Behrendt, Ulf Hoffmann, Maik Belle, Mario Reichert
1989	silver medal	Enrico Ambros, Jörg Behrend, Sylvio Kroll, Jens Milbradt, Sven Tippelt, Andreas Wecker

== Most decorated gymnasts ==
This list includes all East German male artistic gymnasts who have won at least three medals at the Olympic Games and the World Artistic Gymnastics Championships combined. This list does not includes medals won as a unified Germany. Also not included are medals won at the 1984 Friendship Games (alternative Olympics).

Rank	Gymnast	Years	Team	AA	FX	PH	SR	VT	PB	HB	Olympic Total	World Total	Total
1	Sylvio Kroll	1985–1989	1988; 1989; 1985; 1987	1985				1988; 1987; 1989	1985	1985	2	8	10
2	Roland Brückner	1976–1980	1980; 1976; 1978		1980; 1979			1980	1980		5	2	7
3	Sven Tippelt	1985–1989	1988; 1989; 1985; 1987				1988		1988; 1987		3	4	7
4	Holger Behrendt	1985–1988	1988; 1985; 1987				1988			1988; 1987	3	3	6
4	Michael Nikolay	1976–1981	1980; 1976; 1978			1976; 1980; 1981					4	2	6
6	Klaus Köste	1968–1972	1968; 1972; 1970					1972		1970	2	3	5
7	Andreas Wecker	1988–1989	1988; 1989			1989	1989		1989		1	4	5
8	Lutz Mack	1974–1980	1980; 1976; 1974; 1978								1	3	4
8	Wolfgang Thüne	1970–1974	1972; 1970; 1974							1974	1	3	4
10	Matthias Brehme	1966–1972	1968; 1972; 1966; 1970								2	2	4
11	Ralf-Peter Hemmann	1978–1981	1980; 1978					1981			1	2	3
12	Ulf Hoffmann	1985–1988	1988; 1985; 1987								1	2	3
13	Ralph Bärthel	1978–1979	1978					1978; 1979			0	3	3
13	Gerhard Dietrich	1966–1970	1968; 1966; 1970								1	2	3
13	Wolfgang Klotz	1972–1976	1972; 1976; 1974								2	1	3

== See also ==
- East Germany women's national artistic gymnastics team
