= Gymnastics at the 1972 Summer Olympics =

Gymnastics at the Games of the XX Olympiad
- Venue: Sports Hall
- Dates: 27 August – 1 September 1972

At the 1972 Summer Olympics, fourteen different artistic gymnastics events were contested, eight for men and six for women. All events were held at the Sports Hall in Munich from 27 August through 1 September.

== Format of competition ==
The gymnastics competition at the 1972 Summer Olympics was carried out in three stages:

- Competition I - The team competition/qualification round in which all gymnasts, including those who were not part of a team, performed both compulsory and optional exercises. The combined scores of all team members determined the final score of the team. The thirty-six highest scoring gymnasts in the all-around qualified to the individual all-around competition. The six highest scoring gymnasts on each apparatus qualified to the final for that apparatus.
- Competition II - The individual all-around competition, in which those who qualified from Competition I performed exercises on each apparatus. The final score of each gymnast was composed of half the points earned by that gymnast during Competition I and all of the points earned by them in Competition II.
- Competition III - The apparatus finals, in which those who qualified during Competition I performed an exercise on the individual apparatus on which he or she had qualified. The final score of each gymnast was composed of half the points earned by that gymnast on that particular apparatus during Competition I and all of the points earned by them on that particular apparatus in Competition III.

No limits were imposed as to how many gymnasts each country could enter into the individual all-around final or apparatus finals.

== Medal summary ==
=== Men's events ===
Games	Gold	Silver	Bronze
Individual all-around	Sawao Kato; Japan	Eizo Kenmotsu; Japan	Akinori Nakayama; Japan
Team all-around	Japan; Shigeru Kasamatsu; Sawao Kato; Eizo Kenmotsu; Akinori Nakayama; Teruichi Okamura; Mitsuo Tsukahara	Soviet Union; Nikolai Andrianov; Viktor Klimenko; Alexander Maleev; Edvard Mikaelian; Vladimir Schukin; Mikhail Voronin	East Germany; Matthias Brehme; Wolfgang Klotz; Klaus Köste; Jürgen Paeke; Reinhard Rychly; Wolfgang Thüne
Floor exercise	Nikolai Andrianov; Soviet Union	Akinori Nakayama; Japan	Shigeru Kasamatsu; Japan
Horizontal bar	Mitsuo Tsukahara; Japan	Sawao Kato; Japan	Shigeru Kasamatsu; Japan
Parallel bars	Sawao Kato; Japan	Shigeru Kasamatsu; Japan	Eizo Kenmotsu; Japan
Pommel horse	Viktor Klimenko; Soviet Union	Sawao Kato; Japan	Eizo Kenmotsu; Japan
Rings	Akinori Nakayama; Japan	Mikhail Voronin; Soviet Union	Mitsuo Tsukahara; Japan
Vault	Klaus Köste; East Germany	Viktor Klimenko; Soviet Union	Nikolai Andrianov; Soviet Union

=== Women's events ===
Games	Gold	Silver	Bronze
Individual all-around	Ludmila Tourischeva; Soviet Union	Karin Janz; East Germany	Tamara Lazakovich; Soviet Union
Team all-around	Soviet Union; Lyubov Burda; Olga Korbut; Antonina Koshel; Tamara Lazakovich; Elvira Saadi; Ludmila Tourischeva	East Germany; Irene Abel; Angelika Hellmann; Karin Janz; Richarda Schmeißer; Christine Schmitt; Erika Zuchold	Hungary; Ilona Békési; Mónika Császár; Marta Kelemen; Anikó Kéry; Krisztina Medveczky; Zsuzsa Nagy
Balance beam	Olga Korbut; Soviet Union	Tamara Lazakovich; Soviet Union	Karin Janz; East Germany
Floor exercise	Olga Korbut; Soviet Union	Ludmila Tourischeva; Soviet Union	Tamara Lazakovich; Soviet Union
Uneven bars	Karin Janz; East Germany	Olga Korbut; Soviet Union	None awarded (as there was a tie for silver)
Uneven bars	Karin Janz; East Germany	Erika Zuchold; East Germany	None awarded (as there was a tie for silver)
Vault	Karin Janz; East Germany	Erika Zuchold; East Germany	Ludmila Tourischeva; Soviet Union

== Medal table ==
Rank	Nation	Gold	Silver	Bronze	Total
1	Soviet Union	6	6	4	16
2	Japan	5	5	6	16
3	East Germany	3	4	2	9
4	Hungary	0	0	1	1
Totals (4 entries)		14	15	13	42

== See also ==
- List of Olympic medalists in gymnastics (men)
- List of Olympic medalists in gymnastics (women)
