= Gymnastics all-around champions by age =

Prior to 1981, the minimum required age to compete in senior events sanctioned by the FIG was 14. The earliest champions in women's gymnastics tended to be in their 20s; most had studied ballet for years before entering the sport. Hungarian gymnast Ágnes Keleti won individual gold medals at the age of 35 at the 1956 Olympics. Larisa Latynina, the first great Soviet gymnast, won her first Olympic all-around medal at the age of 21, her second at 25 and her third at 29; she became the 1958 World Champion while pregnant with her daughter. Czech gymnast Věra Čáslavská, who followed Latynina to become a two-time Olympic all-around champion, was 22 before she started winning gold medals at the highest level of the sport, and won her final Olympic all-around title at the age of 26.

In the 1970s, the average age of Olympic gymnastics competitors began to gradually decrease. While it was not unheard of for teenagers to compete in the 1960s — Ludmilla Tourischeva was sixteen at her first Olympics in 1968 — they slowly became the norm, as difficulty in gymnastics increased.

== List of Olympic all-around champions ==
Olympic all-around champions 1952–2024- Women

Name	Year	Date of birth	Age at Olympics
(Soviet Union) Maria Gorokhovskaya	1952	October 27, 1921	30 years, 266 days
(Soviet Union) Larisa Latynina	1956	December 27, 1934	21 years, 253 days
(Soviet Union) Larisa Latynina	1960	December 27, 1934	25 years, 253 days
(Czechoslovakia) Věra Čáslavská	1964	May 3, 1942	22 years, 168 days
(Czechoslovakia) Věra Čáslavská	1968	May 3, 1942	26 years, 171 days
(Soviet Union) Ludmilla Tourischeva	1972	July 10, 1952	20 years, 48 days
(Romania) Nadia Comăneci	1976	November 12, 1961	14 years, 249 days
(Soviet Union) Yelena Davydova	1980	August 7, 1961	18 years, 348 days
(United States) Mary Lou Retton	1984	January 24, 1968	16 years, 187 days
(Soviet Union) Yelena Shushunova	1988	April 23, 1969	19 years, 148 days
(Unified Team at the Olympics) Tatiana Gutsu	1992	September 5, 1976	15 years, 325 days
(Ukraine) Lilia Podkopayeva	1996	August 15, 1978	17 years, 339 days
(Romania) Simona Amanar	2000	October 7, 1979	20 years, 344 days
(United States) Carly Patterson	2004	February 4, 1988	16 years, 224 days
(United States) Nastia Liukin	2008	October 30, 1989	18 years, 283 days
(United States) Gabrielle Douglas	2012	December 31, 1995	16 years, 215 days
(United States) Simone Biles	2016	March 14, 1997	19 years, 144 days
(United States) Sunisa Lee	2021	March 9, 2003	18 years, 142 days
(United States) Simone Biles	2024	March 14, 1997	27 years, 140 days

Olympic all-around champions 1952–2024 – Men

Name	Year	Date of birth	Age at Olympics
(Soviet Union) Viktor Chukarin	1952	November 9, 1921	30 years, 259 days
(Soviet Union) Viktor Chukarin	1956	November 9, 1921	34 years, 301 days
(Soviet Union) Boris Shakhlin	1960	January 27, 1932	28 years, 222 days
(Japan) Yukio Endo	1964	January 18, 1937	27 years, 274 days
(Japan) Sawao Kato	1968	October 11, 1946	22 years, 10 days
(Japan) Sawao Kato	1972	October 11, 1946	25 years, 321 days
(Soviet Union) Nikolai Andrianov	1976	October 14, 1952	23 years, 278 days
(Soviet Union) Alexander Dityatin	1980	August 7, 1957	22 years, 348 days
(Japan) Koji Gushiken	1984	November 12, 1956	27 years, 260 days
(Soviet Union) Vladimir Artemov	1988	December 7, 1964	23 years, 286 days
(Belarus) Vitaly Scherbo	1992	January 13, 1972	20 years, 195 days
(China) Li Xiaoshuang	1996	November 1, 1973	22 years, 261 days
(Russia) Alexei Nemov	2000	May 28, 1976	24 years, 110 days
(United States) Paul Hamm	2004	September 24, 1982	21 years, 326 days
(China) Yang Wei	2008	February 8, 1980	28 years, 182 days
(Japan) Kohei Uchimura	2012	January 3, 1989	23 years, 212 days
(Japan) Kohei Uchimura	2016	January 3, 1989	27 years, 215 days
(Japan) Daiki Hashimoto	2020	August 7, 2001	19 years, 355 days
(Japan) Shinnosuke Oka	2024	October 31, 2003	20 years, 274 days

NB: The "age at Olympics" is calculated from the first day of Olympics gymnastics competition, if available; or the date of the Olympics opening ceremonies.
