= Gymnastics at the 1976 Summer Olympics – Men's floor =

Men's floor at the Games of the XXI Olympiad
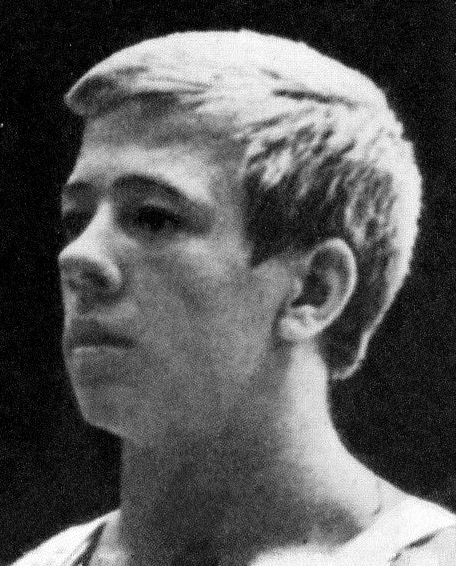
- Gold medalist Nikolai Andrianov (c. 1974)

Medalists
| 1st place, gold medalist(s) | | Nikolai Andrianov | Soviet Union |
| 2nd place, silver medalist(s) | | Vladimir Marchenko | Soviet Union |
| 3rd place, bronze medalist(s) | | Peter Kormann | United States |

These are the results of the men's floor competition, one of eight events for male competitors in artistic gymnastics at the 1976 Summer Olympics in Montreal. The qualification and final rounds took place on July 18, 20, and 23rd at the Montreal Forum.

== Results ==
=== Qualification ===
Eighty-six gymnasts competed in the compulsory and optional rounds on July 18 and 20. The six highest scoring gymnasts advanced to the final on July 23. Each country was limited to two competitors in the final. Half of the points earned by each gymnast during both the compulsory and optional rounds carried over to the final. This constitutes the "prelim" score.

=== Final ===
| Rank | Gymnast | C | O | Prelim | Final | Total |
|---|---|---|---|---|---|---|
| Gold medal | Nikolai Andrianov (URS) | 9.450 | 9.850 | 9.650 | 9.800 | 19.450 |
| Silver medal | Vladimir Marchenko (URS) | 9.550 | 9.800 | 9.675 | 9.750 | 19.425 |
| Bronze medal | Peter Kormann (USA) | 9.300 | 9.700 | 9.500 | 9.800 | 19.300 |
| 4 | Roland Brückner (GDR) | 9.400 | 9.650 | 9.525 | 9.750 | 19.275 |
| 5 | Sawao Kato (JPN) | 9.500 | 9.700 | 9.600 | 9.650 | 19.250 |
| 6 | Eizo Kenmotsu (JPN) | 9.450 | 9.650 | 9.550 | 9.550 | 19.100 |
