= Gymnastics at the 1973 Summer Universiade =

The Gymnastics competitions in the 1973 Summer Universiade were held in Moscow, Soviet Union.

== Men's events ==
Event	Gold	Silver	Bronze
Individual all-around	Nikolai Andrianov (URS)	Vladimir Shchukin (URS)	Vladimir Safronov (URS)
Horizontal Bar	Vladimir Shchukin (URS)	Toshiomi Nishikii (JPN)	Vladimir Safronov (URS)
Parallel Bars	Eberhard Gienger (FRG); Vladimir Shchukin (URS)		Vladimir Safronov (URS)
Vault	Jorge Cuervo (CUB)	Nikolai Andrianov (URS)	Vladimir Safronov (URS)
Pommel Horse	Nikolai Andrianov (URS)	Hiroji Kajiyama (JPN)	Vladimir Shchukin (URS)
Rings	Danuţ Grecu (ROM)	Nikolai Andrianov (URS)	Vladimir Safronov (URS)
Floor Exercise	Nikolai Andrianov (URS)	Hiroji Kajiyama (JPN)	Vladimir Safronov (URS)
Team all-around	Soviet Union (URS)	Japan (JPN)	Romania (ROM)

== Women's events ==
Event	Gold	Silver	Bronze
Individual all-around	Olga Korbut (URS)	Lyubov Burda (URS)	Elvira Saadi (URS)
Uneven Bars	Olga Korbut (URS)	Erzsébet Bellak (HUN)	Lyubov Burda (URS)
Balance Beam	Olga Korbut (URS)	Elvira Saadi (URS)	Lyubov Burda (URS)
Vault	Lyubov Bogdanova (URS)	Elvira Saadi (URS)	Olga Korbut (URS)
Floor Exercise	Olga Korbut (URS)	Elvira Saadi (URS)	Lyubov Burda (URS)
Team all-around	Soviet Union (URS)	Japan (JPN)	Hungary (HUN)

=== Medal table ===
Rank	Nation	Gold	Silver	Bronze	Total
1	Soviet Union (URS)	12	7	12	31
2	Romania (ROU)	1	0	1	2
3	Cuba (CUB)	1	0	0	1
3	West Germany (FRG)	1	0	0	1
5	Japan (JPN)	0	5	0	5
6	Hungary (HUN)	0	1	1	2
Totals (6 entries)		15	13	14	42
