= Gymnastics at the 1972 Summer Olympics – Men's artistic team all-around =

Men's artistic team all-around at the Games of the XX Olympiad
- Venue: Sports Hall
- Date: 27–29 August 1972
- Competitors: 96 from 16 nations
- Winning total: 571.250 points

Medalists
1st place, gold medalist(s)		Shigeru Kasamatsu; Sawao Kato; Eizo Kenmotsu; Akinori Nakayama; Teruichi Okamura; Mitsuo Tsukahara	Japan
2nd place, silver medalist(s)		Nikolai Andrianov; Viktor Klimenko; Alexander Maleev; Edvard Mikaelian; Vladimir Schukin; Mikhail Voronin	Soviet Union
3rd place, bronze medalist(s)		Matthias Brehme; Wolfgang Klotz; Klaus Köste; Jürgen Paeke; Reinhard Rychly; Wolfgang Thüne	East Germany

These are the results of the men's team all-around competition, one of eight events for male competitors in artistic gymnastics at the 1972 Summer Olympics in Munich. The compulsory and optional rounds took place on August 27 and 29 at the Sports Hall.

== Results ==
The final score for each team was determined by combining all of the scores earned by the team on each apparatus during the compulsory and optional rounds. If all six gymnasts on a team performed a routine on a single apparatus during compulsories or optionals, only the five highest scores on that apparatus counted toward the team total.

Rank	Team	Total
Gold medal	Japan	571.250
Silver medal	Soviet Union	564.050
Bronze medal	East Germany	559.700
4	Poland	551.100
5	West Germany	546.400
6	North Korea	545.050
7	Romania	538.900
8	Hungary	538.600
9	Czechoslovakia	538.550
10	United States	533.850
11	Switzerland	533.000
12	Yugoslavia	530.100
13	France	522.650
14	Cuba	519.900
15	Bulgaria	516.350
16	Italy	510.100
