= Constantin Petrescu =

Romanian gymnast

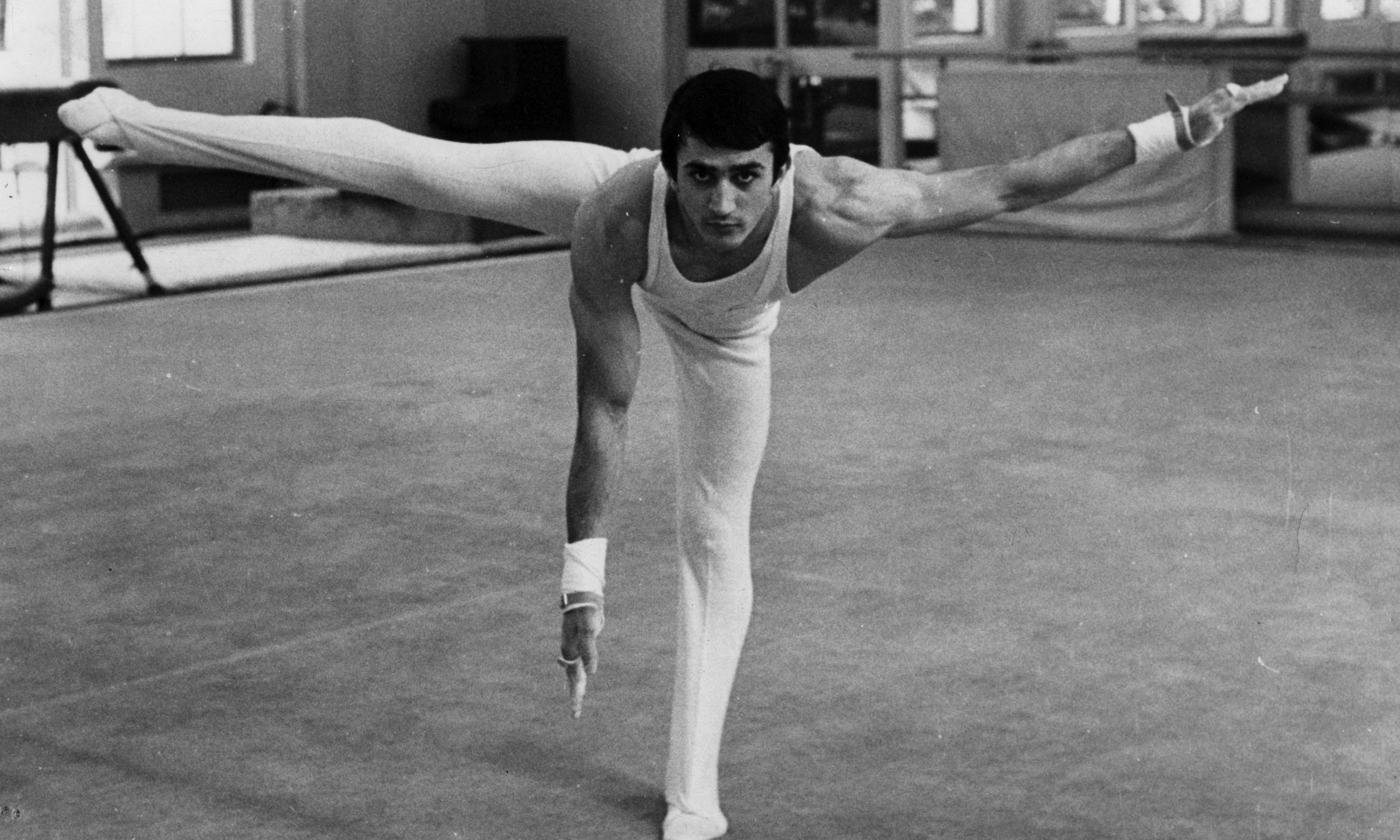
- Petrescu at CS Dinamo București - 1970s

Personal information
- Full name: Constantin Ion Petrescu
- Born: 8 January 1951 (age 75) Bucharest, Romania
- Height: 173 cm (5 ft 8 in)

Gymnastics career
- Discipline: Men's artistic gymnastics
- Country represented: Romania
- Club: CS Dinamo București
- Former coach: Mircea Badulescu

Constantin Petrescu (born 8 January 1951) is a retired Romanian gymnast, and professional gymnastics coach. He competed in eight events at the 1972 Summer Olympics. He is a well known figure in the international gymnastics community as an accomplished coach at the collegiate, national, and international levels. He has lived in the United States since 1988, when he defected from then-communist Socialist Republic of Romania before the Romanian Revolution in December of the subsequent year.

== International competition and 1972 Olympic Games ==
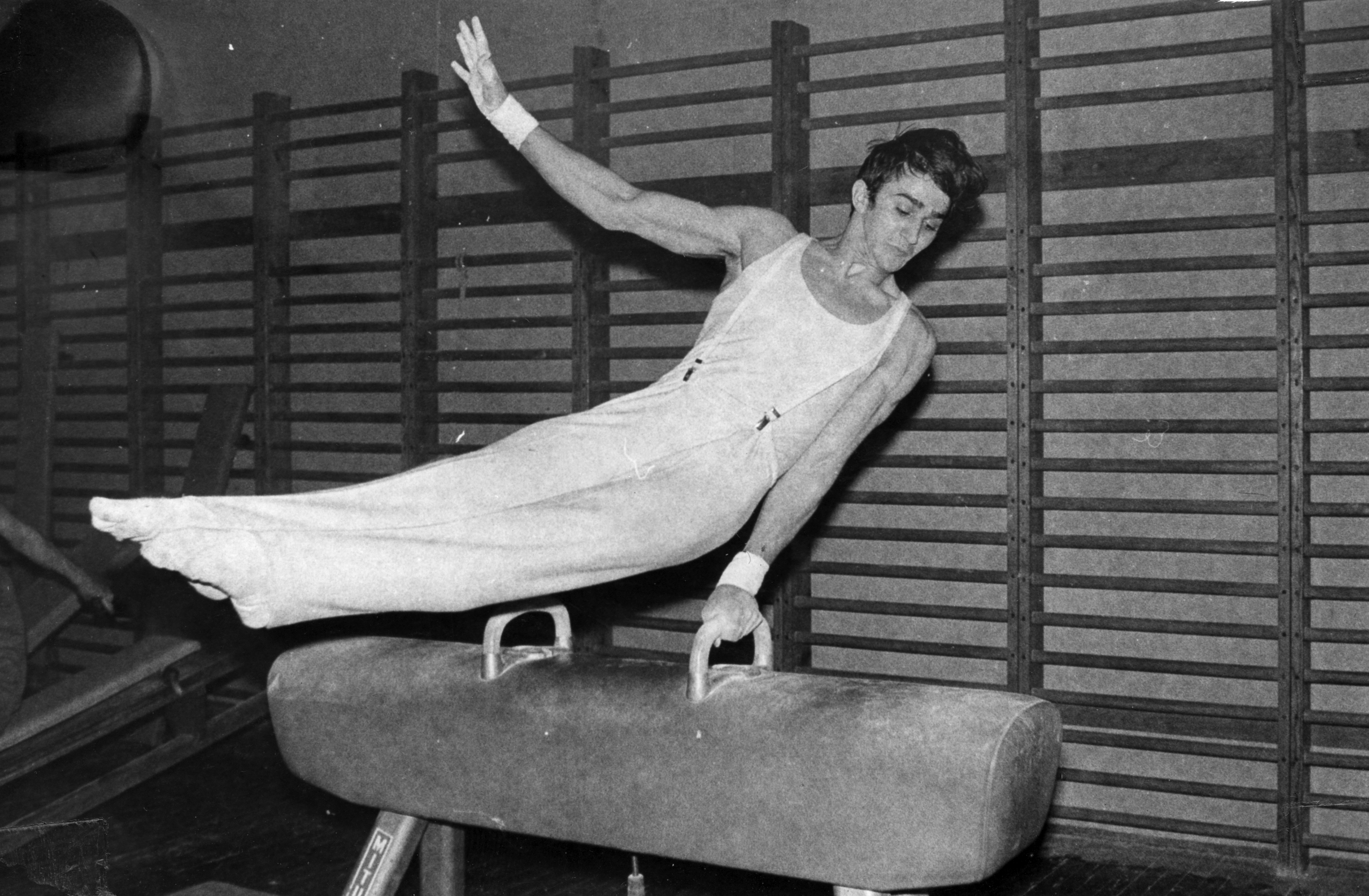
Petrescu training at CS Dinamo București - late 1960s

Coached by Mircea Bădulescu, his first recorded international-level competition was a Juniors' level meet between Romania and Switzerland held November 22–23, 1969 in Bucharest, Romania at Floreasca Hall.

Participation in national, regional, and international competition increased over subsequent years culminating in Petrescu representing the Socialist Republic of Romania at the 1972 Summer Olympics. At the senior elite level, Petrescu specialized in the Horizontal bar event which earned him consecutive Romanian National Champion titles in 1972 and 1973.

Post-Olympics competition included participation at the 1973 Summer Universiade, Moscow, USSR, and the 1974 World Artistic Gymnastics Championships in Varna, Bulgaria Along with the rest of the Romanian team, Petrescu participated in the American Cup (gymnastics) held on March 27–28, 1976 at Madison Square Garden in New York City.

== Post-1972 Olympics US tour ==
Between February 20 and March 5 of 1973, at the invitation of USA Gymnastics Federation, the 1972 Romanian Olympic gymnastics teams embarked on a two-week tour of the United States that included several friendly competitions against top U.S. collegiate athletes.

- East Stroudsburg University of Pennsylvania, East Stroudsburg, PA
- Syracuse, New York
- Denver, CO
- University of Oregon, Eugene OR
- University of California, Berkeley, Berkeley, CA
- Arizona State University, Tempe AZ

It was during this tour that Petrescu met both Abie Grossfeld (former Southern Connecticut University Head Coach) and Bruno Klaus (former ESSC Head Coach), both of which helped set in motion a series of events that lead to Petrescu coaching a perfect 10 earned at a USA Gymnastics National Championships more than two decades later.

== Coaching career and defection to the United States ==
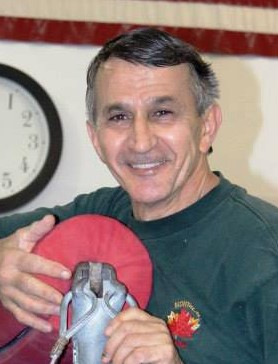
Coach Constantin Petrescu at IGC in 2014

After his competitive career, Petrescu studied the technical aspects of the sport of gymnastics, methodology, and training. In 1976, he earned a master's degree in physical education and sport from the National University of Physical Education and Sport in Bucharest, Romania, formally allowing him to coach, and setting the stage for a long coaching career. Petrescu rose through the ranks of Romanian gymnastics to become head coach of the Romanian Junior Men's and Women's National Teams, and along the way coached several Men's and Women's former Romanian Olympic team members.

In 1988, Petrescu temporarily left his family in Baia Mare, Romania, and defected to the United States, where he was hosted in Hamden, Connecticut, by his brother, Dumitru Petrescu. This is where Petrescu had his first international coaching experience as Southern Connecticut State University assistant coach to renowned gymnastics hall of famer head coach Abie Grossfeld, which he met more than 15 years earlier as part of the Romanian Teams' post-Olympics tour in 1973.

In November 1989, Petrescu accepted a coaching offer from Bruno Klaus, an old friend, ESSC head coach, and owner of the International Gymnastics School and Camp (IGC) in Stroudsburg, PA, which he also met during his post-Olympics tour in 1973. So started the longest tenure of Petrescu's coaching career where he later became director and head coach of men's and women's programs at IGC. At IGC, Petrescu had his greatest impact on USA gymnastics by coaching multiple USA Junior National Men's Team members, and multiple USA Senior National Championships competitors.

A notable achievement, and one of the highlights of Petrescu's coaching career, is the perfect 10 scored on Vault (gymnastics) during the 1998 USA Gymnastics National Championships by one of his most accomplished and longest-time gymnasts, Brent Klaus.

Starting July 31, 2003, Petrescu took a several year sabbatical from IGC by accepting the position of director and head coach of the Spirals Foundation for Gymnastics at University of California, Santa Barbara (UCSB).

== Reunited with his family ==
After the fall of the Romanian communist regime in December 1989, and after two and a half years apart, Petrescu was reunited with his family in the United States exactly on his 15th wedding anniversary. On July 25, 1990, his wife, Margareta, his 10-year-old son, Mihai, and his five-year-old daughter, Mihaela flew into John F. Kennedy International Airport to start their new lives together.
