= Sawao =

- Gender: Male

Origin
- Origin: Japanese
- Meaning: Different meanings depending on the kanji used

Sawao (written: 沢男 or さわお in hiragana) is a masculine Japanese given name. Notable people with the name include:

- Sawao Kato (加藤 沢男; born 1946), Japanese gymnast
- Sawao Yamanaka (山中 さわお; born 1968), Japanese musician
