= 1975 European Men's Artistic Gymnastics Championships =

11th European Men's Artistic Gymnastics Championships
- Venue: Eisstadion Allmend
- Location: Bern, Switzerland
- Start date: 31 May 1975
- End date: 1 June 1975

The 11th European Men's Artistic Gymnastics Championships was held in Bern, Switzerland from 31 May–1 June 1975.

== Medalists ==
Event	Gold	Silver	Bronze
All-around	(Soviet Union) Nikolai Andrianov	(West Germany) Eberhard Gienger	(Soviet Union) Alexander Dityatin
Floor	(Soviet Union) Nikolai Andrianov (Poland) Andrzej Szajna	Not awarded	(Czechoslovakia) Jiří Tabák (Bulgaria) Andrey Keranov
Pommel horse	(Hungary) Zoltán Magyar	(Soviet Union) Nikolai Andrianov	(West Germany) Eberhard Gienger
Rings	(Romania) Dan Grecu	(Romania) Mihai Borș	(Soviet Union) Alexander Dityatin
Vault	(Soviet Union) Nikolai Andrianov	(Poland) Andrzej Szajna	(Czechoslovakia) Jiří Tabák
Parallel bars	(Soviet Union) Nikolai Andrianov	(Soviet Union) Alexander Dityatin	(Soviet Union) Viktor Klimenko
Horizontal bar	(Soviet Union) Nikolai Andrianov (West Germany) Eberhard Gienger	Not awarded	(Poland) Andrzej Szajna

=== Medal table ===
Rank	Nation	Gold	Silver	Bronze	Total
1	Soviet Union (URS)	5	2	3	10
2	Poland (POL)	1	1	1	3
2	West Germany (FRG)	1	1	1	3
4	Romania (ROM)	1	1	0	2
5	Hungary (HUN)	1	0	0	1
6	Czechoslovakia (TCH)	0	0	2	2
7	Bulgaria (BUL)	0	0	1	1
Totals (7 entries)		9	5	8	22

== Defection of Wolfgang Thüne ==
During the post-competition banquet on Sunday June 1, East German gymnast and 1974 World horizontal bar silver medalist Wolfgang Thüne vanished. On the morning of Monday June 2, Thüne reappeared in Frankfurt am Main, West Germany. For many years it was unclear how Thüne successfully managed to escape to West Germany, with official reports claiming he "hitchhiked". In 1999, 24 years after the defection, it was revealed that West German gymnast Eberhard Gienger, who bested Thüne at the previous year's World Championships and who had also won the horizontal bar gold and all-around silver medals at this competition, was instrumental in aiding Thüne.

Thüne had reached out to Gienger in a bathroom at the Eisstadion Allmend where the competition was taking place, requesting help in defecting; Gienger accepted without hesitation. On the night of the escape, Gienger and Thüne, alongside Gienger's girlfriend, a judge, and a masseur, drove toward the Swiss border city Basel before entering West Germany. At the passport control Gienger showed the border guard four IDs, explaining that the fifth was in a jacket in the trunk and he’d fetch it right away. But the guard waved them through without checking. From there Gienger brought Thüne to fellow West German national team member, Walter Mössinger's house in Freiburg im Breisgau and he immediately returned to the competition banquet in Bern.
