= Gymnastics at the 1976 Summer Olympics – Men's artistic team all-around =

Men's artistic team all-around at the Games of the XXI Olympiad
- Venue: Montreal Forum
- Date: 18–20 July 1976
- Competitors: 72 from 12 nations
- Winning total: 576.850 points

Medalists
1st place, gold medalist(s)		Shun Fujimoto; Hisato Igarashi; Hiroshi Kajiyama; Sawao Kato; Eizo Kenmotsu; Mitsuo Tsukahara	Japan
2nd place, silver medalist(s)		Nikolai Andrianov; Alexander Dityatin; Gennady Krysin; Vladimir Marshenko; Vladimir Markelov; Vladimir Tikhonov	Soviet Union
3rd place, bronze medalist(s)		Roland Brückner; Rainer Hanschke; Bernd Jäger; Wolfgang Klotz; Lutz Mack; Michael Nikolay	East Germany

These are the results of the men's team all-around competition, one of eight events for male competitors in artistic gymnastics at the 1976 Summer Olympics in Montreal. The compulsory and optional rounds took place on July 18 and 20 at the Montreal Forum.

== Results ==
The final score for each team was determined by combining all of the scores earned by the team on each apparatus during the compulsory and optional rounds. If all six gymnasts on a team performed a routine on a single apparatus during compulsories or optionals, only the five highest scores on that apparatus counted toward the team total.

Rank	Team	Total
Gold medal	Japan	576.850
Silver medal	Soviet Union	576.450
Bronze medal	East Germany	564.650
4	Hungary	564.450
5	West Germany	557.400
6	Romania	557.300
7	United States	556.100
8	Switzerland	550.600
9	Czechoslovakia	550.150
10	France	546.450
11	Poland	544.850
12	Bulgaria	532.600

In the table below "C" stands for "Compulsory exercises" and "O" stands for "Optional exercises".

Team score for each of the routines is the sum of scores of all team members in that routine, except the lowest of them, which is discarded. Total team score is the sum of team's scores in the routines.

Rank	Team / Competitor	FX		PH		RG		VT		PB		HB		Total		Score
Rank	Team / Competitor	C	O	C	O	C	O	C	O	C	O	C	O	C	O	Score
1	Japan	47.20	47.95	47.70	48.70	47.20	48.65	47.80	47.85	48.15	48.30	48.25	49.10	286.30	290.55	576.85
1	55 Shun Fujimoto	9.30	9.55	9.10	9.50	9.35	9.70	9.00	0.00	9.45	0.00	9.60	0.00	55.80	28.75	84.55
1	56 Hisato Igarashi	9.00	9.45	9.40	9.60	9.25	9.50	9.45	9.45	9.55	9.45	9.60	9.85	56.25	57.30	113.55
1	57 Hiroshi Kajiyama	9.45	9.50	9.50	9.75	9.40	9.70	9.65	9.70	9.70	9.65	9.50	9.75	57.20	58.05	115.25
1	59 Sawao Kato	9.50	9.70	9.60	9.80	9.45	9.80	9.55	9.55	9.75	9.80	9.65	9.75	57.50	58.40	115.90
1	60 Eizo Kemmotsu	9.45	9.65	9.70	9.85	9.55	9.70	9.65	9.35	9.00	9.75	9.65	9.85	57.00	58.15	115.15
1	61 Mitsuo Tsukahara	9.50	9.55	9.50	9.70	9.45	9.75	9.50	9.80	9.70	9.65	9.75	9.90	57.40	58.35	115.75
2	USSR	47.80	48.80	48.00	47.90	48.00	49.35	47.60	47.60	47.70	47.60	47.70	48.40	286.80	289.65	576.45
2	90 Nikolai Andrianov	9.45	9.85	9.70	9.75	9.80	9.90	9.65	9.70	9.80	9.70	9.70	9.50	58.10	58.40	116.50
2	91 Alexander Dityatin	9.60	9.70	9.65	9.65	9.60	9.90	9.40	9.65	9.50	9.40	9.45	9.65	57.20	57.95	115.15
2	92 Gennady Krysin	9.50	9.70	9.45	9.55	9.30	9.60	9.50	9.50	9.45	9.40	9.50	9.80	56.70	57.55	114.25
2	93 Vladimir Marchenko	9.55	9.80	9.60	9.45	9.50	9.85	9.45	9.55	8.55	9.50	9.45	9.60	56.10	57.75	113.85
2	94 Vladimir Markelov	9.70	9.75	9.60	9.40	9.70	9.90	9.60	9.20	9.65	9.60	9.60	9.70	57.85	57.55	115.40
2	96 Vladimir Tikhonov	9.40	9.55	9.40	9.50	9.40	9.80	9.40	8.65	9.30	8.80	9.30	9.65	56.20	55.95	112.15
3	GDR	46.50	47.25	47.20	47.40	46.55	47.80	46.85	46.85	47.00	46.65	47.15	47.45	281.25	283.40	564.65
3	31 Roland Brückner	9.40	9.65	9.35	9.20	9.10	9.50	9.50	9.55	9.10	9.10	9.25	9.30	55.70	56.30	112.00
3	32 Rainer Hanschke	9.20	9.40	9.50	9.50	9.30	9.45	9.05	8.90	9.35	9.15	9.40	9.30	55.80	55.70	111.50
3	33 Bernd Jäger	9.00	9.10	9.30	9.45	9.30	9.60	9.40	9.40	9.65	9.55	9.60	9.60	56.25	56.70	112.95
3	34 Wolfgang Klotz	9.40	9.35	9.45	9.35	9.30	9.35	9.35	9.50	9.05	9.20	9.20	9.45	55.75	56.20	111.95
3	35 Lutz Mack	9.30	9.50	9.30	9.25	9.45	9.75	9.35	9.40	9.50	9.40	9.30	9.50	56.20	56.80	113.00
3	36 Michael Nikolay	9.20	9.35	9.60	9.85	9.20	9.50	9.25	9.00	9.40	9.35	9.60	9.60	56.25	56.65	112.90
4	HUN	45.40	47.00	46.75	47.50	46.75	47.80	47.85	47.85	47.00	46.10	46.90	47.55	280.65	283.80	564.55
4	49 Zoltan Magyar	9.00	9.50	9.75	9.85	9.35	9.60	9.60	9.55	9.55	9.45	9.50	9.55	56.75	57.5	114.250
4	50 Imre Molnar	9.25	9.45	9.45	9.55	9.35	9.55	9.75	9.70	9.60	9.15	9.35	9.50	56.75	56.90	113.650
4	46 Ferenc Donath	9.15	9.45	9.25	9.45	9.55	9.75	9.55	9.55	9.40	9.30	9.55	9.65	56.45	57.15	113.600
4	48 Bela Laufer	9.05	?	9.05	9.45	9.30	9.50	9.50	9.55	9.30	8.70	9.25	9.55	55.45	?	?
4	44 Imre Banrevi	8.95	?	9.20	8.15	9.20	9.40	9.45	9.50	8.55	9.20	9.25	9.30	54.60	?	?
4	47 Farkas Arpad	8.95	?	9.10	9.20	9.15	9.35	9.30	9.40	9.15	9.00	9.10	8.75	54.75	?	?
7	USA	45.20	46.70	45.35	47.20	45.80	46.60	45.90	46.45	46.65	46.00	46.70	47.55	275.60	280.50	556.10
7	103 Wayne Young	8.90	9.30	9.05	9.40	9.30	9.60	9.20	9.40	9.35	9.20	9.35	9.50	55.150	56.40	111.55
7	101 Kurt Thomas	9.10	9.55	9.25	9.70	9.05	9.25	9.20	8.45	9.40	9.30	9.30	9.50	55.30	55.75	111.050
7	100 Peter Kormann	9.30	9.70	9.00	9.40	9.05	9.15	9.10	9.25	9.05	9.05	9.20	9.50	54.70	56.05	110.75
7	98 Tom Beach	8.95	9.20	8.85	9.20	9.20	9.40	9.20	9.30	9.15	9.00	9.45	9.65	54.80	55.75	110.55
7	97 Marshall Avener	8.65	8.95	9.20	9.50	9.20	8.95	9.05	9.20	9.20	9.05	9.10	9.40	54.40	55.05	109.45
7	99 Bart Conner	8.95	8.95	8.55	8.70	8.95	9.20	9.20	9.30	9.55	9.40	9.40	9.20	54.60	54.75	109.35
