= 1974 World Artistic Gymnastics Championships =

Gymnastics competition

- Location: Varna, Bulgaria

The 18th Artistic Gymnastics World Championships were held in Varna, Bulgaria, in 1974. This was the first world championships at which the individual all-around titles were contested in a separate session of competition, rather than being decided after the team competition.

== Controversies ==
The World Championships were originally awarded to Varna. However, there were significant concerns over whether all athletes would be able to obtain visas, which the Bulgarian federation could not guarantee, particularly those from Apartheid-era South Africa, as Bulgaria did not have diplomatic relations with South Africa at the time. In April 1974, the World Championships were moved to Munich, but at another International Gymnastics Federation (FIG) meeting in July, they were returned to Varna in a vote of 26 to 24. Neither Bulgaria nor West Germany was pleased by the series of decisions, with accusations coming from Bulgaria that the FIG was trying to force them to accommodate "South African racists", while the vice president of the West German Gymnastics Federation criticized the FIG for not upholding its statute that all FIG members must be granted visas to compete and wrote, "Gymnastics became illegitimate in Varna."

Several parties alleged corruption in the scoring during the competition. Frank Endo of the United States, writing for Gymnastics magazine, said that both the Japanese and American delegations had heard that Yuri Titov had told Soviet judges to underscore their teams. Olga Korbut also alleged that two of the event final golds were arranged in advance; when she saw her scores for the uneven bars in the event final, which gave the gold to East German Annelore Zinke, she asked Titov to file a protest, and he refused so that Ludmilla Tourischeva would receive gold on the floor final in exchange. Titov, on his part, complained that the head judge, Walter Lehmann, and the FIG president, Arthur Gander, intervened to ensure that Shigeru Kasamatsu won the individual all-around title over Nikolai Andrianov. Minot Simons II, also writing for Gymnast magazine, alleged that judges were told to raise scores in several instances during the women's event, especially for the Hungarian gymnasts, as the head of the women's technical committee was from Hungary. During the women's team optionals, the crowd protested for around twenty minutes after Ann Carr was given a score they thought was too low.

After the 1972 Summer Olympics, the starting score for a common women's vault was lowered, and the rules for qualifying for vault finals were changed, leading to more difficult vaults being seen at the World Championships compared to two years earlier.

== Results ==
Event	Gold	Silver	Bronze
Men
Team all-around	Japan; Shigeru Kasamatsu; Eizo Kenmotsu; Mitsuo Tsukahara; Hiroshi Kajiyama; Fumio Honma; Sawao Kato	Soviet Union; Nikolai Andrianov; Edvard Mikaelian; Vladimir Marchenko; Paata Shamugiya; Vladimir Safronov; Viktor Klimenko	East Germany; Wolfgang Thüne; Bernd Jäger; Wolfgang Klotz; Rainer Hanschke; Lutz Mack; Olaf Grosse
Individual all-around	(Japan) Shigeru Kasamatsu	(Soviet Union) Nikolai Andrianov	(Japan) Eizo Kenmotsu
Floor	(Japan) Shigeru Kasamatsu	(Japan) Hiroshi Kajiyama	(Bulgaria) Andrey Keranov
Pommel horse	(Hungary) Zoltán Magyar	(Soviet Union) Nikolai Andrianov	(Japan) Eizo Kenmotsu
Rings	(Romania) Dănuț Grecu (Soviet Union) Nikolai Andrianov	none awarded	(Poland) Andrzej Szajna
Vault	(Japan) Shigeru Kasamatsu	(Soviet Union) Nikolai Andrianov	(Japan) Hiroshi Kajiyama
Parallel bars	(Japan) Eizo Kenmotsu	(Soviet Union) Nikolai Andrianov	(Soviet Union) Vladimir Marchenko
Horizontal bar	(West Germany) Eberhard Gienger	(East Germany) Wolfgang Thüne	(Japan) Eizo Kenmotsu (Poland) Andrzej Szajna
Women
Team all-around	Soviet Union; Ludmilla Tourischeva; Olga Korbut; Elvira Saadi; Rusudan Sikharulidze; Nina Dronova; Nelli Kim	East Germany; Angelika Hellmann; Annelore Zinke; Richarda Schmeißer; Bärbel Röhrich; Heike Gerisch; Irene Abel	Hungary; Krisztina Medveczky; Mónika Császár; Zsuzsa Nagy; Marta Egervari; Zsuzsa Matulai; Ágnes Bánfai
Individual all-around	(Soviet Union) Ludmilla Tourischeva	(Soviet Union) Olga Korbut	(East Germany) Angelika Hellmann
Vault	(Soviet Union) Olga Korbut	(Soviet Union) Ludmilla Tourischeva	(Czechoslovakia) Božena Perdykulová
Uneven bars	(East Germany) Annelore Zinke	(Soviet Union) Olga Korbut	(Soviet Union) Ludmilla Tourischeva
Balance beam	(Soviet Union) Ludmilla Tourischeva	(Soviet Union) Olga Korbut	(Soviet Union) Nellie Kim
Floor	(Soviet Union) Ludmilla Tourischeva	(Soviet Union) Olga Korbut	(Soviet Union) Elvira Saadi (Soviet Union) Rusudan Siharulidze

== Men ==
=== Team Final ===
1st	Japan	Shigeru Kasamatsu	571.400
1st	Japan	Eizo Kenmotsu	571.400
1st	Japan	Mitsuo Tsukahara	571.400
1st	Japan	Hiroshi Kajiyama	571.400
1st	Japan	Fumio Honma	571.400
1st	Japan	Sawao Kato	571.400
2nd	Soviet Union	Nikolai Andrianov	567.350
2nd	Soviet Union	Edvard Mikaelian	567.350
2nd	Soviet Union	Vladimir Marchenko	567.350
2nd	Soviet Union	Paata Shamugiya	567.350
2nd	Soviet Union	Vladimir Safronov	567.350
2nd	Soviet Union	Viktor Klimenko	567.350
3rd	East Germany	Wolfgang Thüne	562.500
3rd	East Germany	Bernd Jäger	562.500
3rd	East Germany	Wolfgang Klotz	562.500
3rd	East Germany	Rainer Hanschke	562.500
3rd	East Germany	Lutz Mack	562.500
3rd	East Germany	Olaf Grosse	562.500
4th	Hungary	Imre Molnar	552.800
4th	Hungary	Zoltán Magyar	552.800
4th	Hungary	Ferenc Donáth	552.800
4th	Hungary	István Kiss	552.800
4th	Hungary	Janos Sivado	552.800
4th	Hungary	Bela Laufer	552.800
5th	West Germany	Eberhard Gienger	552.600
5th	West Germany	Walter Mossinger	552.600
5th	West Germany	Günter Spies	552.600
5th	West Germany	Edgar Jorek	552.600
5th	West Germany	Werner Steinmetz	552.600
5th	West Germany	Reinhard Ritter	552.600
6th	Romania	Dănuț Grecu	547.250
6th	Romania	Nicolai Oprescu	547.250
6th	Romania	Georghe Paunescu	547.250
6th	Romania	Mihai Bors	547.250
6th	Romania	Constantin Petrescu	547.250
6th	Romania	Stefan Gal	547.250
7th	Switzerland	Peter Rohner	547.200
7th	Switzerland	Robert Bretscher	547.200
7th	Switzerland	Armin Vock	547.200
7th	Switzerland	Michele Arnaboldi	547.200
7th	Switzerland	Reinhold Schnyder	547.200
7th	Switzerland	Renati Giess	547.200

=== All-around ===
Rank	Gymnast	Total
1st place, gold medalist(s)	Shigeru Kasamatsu (JPN)	115.500
2nd place, silver medalist(s)	Nikolai Andrianov (URS)	115.375
3rd place, bronze medalist(s)	Eizo Kenmotsu (JPN)	114.750
4	Hiroshi Kajiyama (JPN)	114.650
5	Mitsuo Tsukahara (JPN)	114.600
6	Edvard Mikaelian (URS)	114.175
7	Wolfgang Thüne (GDR)	114.000
8	Andrzej Szajna (POL)	113.725
9	Vladimir Marchenko (URS)	113.700
10	Paata Shamugiya (URS)	113.375
11	Imre Molnar (HUN)	112.875
12	Fumio Honma (JPN)	112.600
13	Vladimir Safronov (URS)	112.575
14	Eberhard Gienger (FRG)	111.975
15	Zoltán Magyar (HUN)	111.750
16	Rainer Hanschke (GDR)	111.350
17	Dănuţ Grecu (ROU)	111.200
17	Walter Mössinger (FRG)	111.200
19	Peter Rohner (SUI)	111.150
20	Jiri Netusil (TCH)	111.125
21	Bernd Jäger (GDR)	111.050
22	Lutz Mack (GDR)	111.025
23	Ferenc Donáth (HUN)	110.875
24	Henri Boerio (FRA)	110.775
25	Wayne Young (USA)	110.625
26	Steve Hug (USA)	110.550
27	Olaf Grosse (GDR)	110.525
28	Edgar Jorek (FRG)	110.500
29	Robert Bretscher (SUI)	110.450
30	Günter Spiess (FRG)	110.025
31	Armin Vock (SUI)	109.800
32	István Kiss (HUN)	109.675
33	Gustav Tannenberger (TCH)	109.650
34	Wolfgang Klotz (GDR)	108.750
35	Nicolae Oprescu (ROU)	100.875
36	Michele Arnaboldi (SUI)	80.700

=== Floor Exercise ===
Rank	Gymnast	Total
1st place, gold medalist(s)	Shigeru Kasamatsu (JPN)	19.375
2nd place, silver medalist(s)	Hiroshi Kajiyama (JPN)	19.325
3rd place, bronze medalist(s)	Andrei Keranov (BUL)	19.225
4	Vladimir Marchenko (URS)	19.150
5	Rainer Hanschke (GDR)	18.900
6	Edvard Mikaelian (URS)	18.800

=== Pommel Horse ===
Rank	Gymnast	Total
1st place, gold medalist(s)	Zoltán Magyar (HUN)	19.575
2nd place, silver medalist(s)	Nikolai Andrianov (URS)	19.375
3rd place, bronze medalist(s)	Eizo Kenmotsu (JPN)	19.225
4	Shigeru Kasamatsu (JPN)	18.950
5	Imre Molnar (HUN)	18.875
6	Wolfgang Thüne (GDR)	18.500

=== Rings ===
Rank	Gymnast	Total
1st place, gold medalist(s)	Dănuț Grecu (ROU)	19.525
1st place, gold medalist(s)	Nikolai Andrianov (URS)	19.525
3rd place, bronze medalist(s)	Andrzej Szajna (POL)	19.225
4	Mitsuo Tsukahara (JPN)	19.125
5	Mihai Bors (ROU)	19.000
6	Wolfgang Thüne (GDR)	18.925

=== Vault ===
Rank	Gymnast	Total
1st place, gold medalist(s)	Shigeru Kasamatsu (JPN)	19.325
2nd place, silver medalist(s)	Nikolai Andrianov (URS)	19.250
3rd place, bronze medalist(s)	Hiroshi Kajiyama (JPN)	19.225
4	Andrzej Szajna (POL)	19.175
5	Eizo Kenmotsu (JPN)	19.075
6	Imre Molnar (HUN)	18.750

=== Parallel Bars ===
Rank	Gymnast	Total
1st place, gold medalist(s)	Eizo Kenmotsu (JPN)	19.375
2nd place, silver medalist(s)	Nikolai Andrianov (URS)	19.325
3rd place, bronze medalist(s)	Vladimir Marchenko (URS)	18.850
4	Hiroshi Kajiyama (JPN)	18.275
5	Bernd Jäger (GDR)	18.100
6	Wolfgang Thüne (GDR)	17.625

=== Horizontal Bar ===
Rank	Gymnast	Total
1st place, gold medalist(s)	Eberhard Gienger (FRG)	19.500
2nd place, silver medalist(s)	Wolfgang Thüne (GDR)	19.450
3rd place, bronze medalist(s)	Andrzej Szajna (POL)	19.275
3rd place, bronze medalist(s)	Eizo Kenmotsu (JPN)	19.275
5	Bernd Jäger (GDR)	19.250
6	Mitsuo Tsukahara (JPN)	18.900

== Women ==
=== Team Final ===
Rank	Team	Vault (gymnastics)		Uneven bars		Balance beam		Floor (gymnastics)		Total
Rank	Team	C	O	C	O	C	O	C	O	Total
1st place, gold medalist(s)	Soviet Union	94.950		95.800		95.850		97.600		384.200
1st place, gold medalist(s)	Ludmilla Tourischeva	9.600	9.800	9.650	9.750	9.850	9.900	9.850	9.900	78.300
1st place, gold medalist(s)	Olga Korbut	9.500	9.700	9.750	9.800	9.650	9.800	9.750	9.850	77.800
1st place, gold medalist(s)	Elvira Saadi	9.350	9.400	9.450	9.550	9.000	9.550	9.700	9.800	75.800
1st place, gold medalist(s)	Rusudan Sikharulidze	9.400	9.500	9.250	9.400	9.200	9.450	9.650	9.850	75.700
1st place, gold medalist(s)	Nina Dronova	9.250	9.400	9.350	9.400	9.500	9.500	9.450	9.700	75.550
1st place, gold medalist(s)	Nelli Kim	9.300	8.600	9.500	9.600	9.300	9.600	9.550	9.550	75.000
2nd place, silver medalist(s)	East Germany	93.200		95.800		93.200		94.350		376.550
2nd place, silver medalist(s)	Angelika Hellmann	9.400	9.500	9.600	9.700	9.450	9.600	9.550	9.650	76.450
2nd place, silver medalist(s)	Annelore Zinke	9.300	9.450	9.600	9.900	8.700	9.500	9.400	9.600	75.450
2nd place, silver medalist(s)	Richarda Schmeißer	9.200	9.300	9.500	9.700	9.350	9.050	9.350	9.500	74.950
2nd place, silver medalist(s)	Bärbel Röhrich	9.200	9.500	9.200	9.650	9.100	9.350	9.200	9.400	74.600
2nd place, silver medalist(s)	Heike Gerisch	8.950	9.300	9.300	9.350	9.200	9.500	9.150	9.300	74.050
2nd place, silver medalist(s)	Irene Abel	9.050	9.300	9.350	9.500	8.900	9.250	9.200	9.500	74.050
3rd place, bronze medalist(s)	Hungary	93.200		93.900		90.600		93.050		370.750
3rd place, bronze medalist(s)	Krisztina Medveczky	9.250	9.450	9.600	9.500	9.500	8.950	9.250	9.550	75.050
3rd place, bronze medalist(s)	Mónika Császár	9.250	9.450	9.550	9.500	9.400	8.950	9.300	9.550	74.950
3rd place, bronze medalist(s)	Zsuzsa Nagy	9.200	9.500	9.300	9.300	9.250	9.050	9.000	9.300	73.900
3rd place, bronze medalist(s)	Márta Egervári	9.050	9.550	9.200	9.600	9.000	8.400	9.050	9.350	73.200
3rd place, bronze medalist(s)	Zsuzsa Matulai	9.100	9.350	9.100	9.150	8.950	9.050	9.050	9.400	73.150
3rd place, bronze medalist(s)	Ágnes Bánfai	9.100	9.350	9.000	9.250	9.050	8.350	9.100	9.450	72.650
4	Romania	93.250		92.300		90.700		93.050		369.300
4	Alina Goreac	9.250	9.700	9.200	9.700	9.300	9.400	9.100	9.600	75.250
4	Anca Grigoraș	9.150	9.600	9.050	9.600	9.050	9.350	9.250	9.600	74.650
4	Elena Ceampelea	8.950	9.200	8.950	9.500	8.450	9.200	9.200	9.500	72.950
4	Paula Ioan	9.250	9.500	8.850	9.350	8.700	8.950	8.800	9.300	72.700
4	~~Aurelia Dobre~~	9.000	9.500	8.700	9.200	8.850	8.800	9.050	9.500	72.600
4	Rodica Sabău	9.100	9.150	8.900	9.150	8.800	9.100	8.850	9.400	72.450
5	Czechoslovakia	92.750		91.000		91.300		93.400		368.450
5	Zdena Dorňáková	9.350	9.300	9.200	9.300	9.150	9.350	9.300	9.600	74.550
5	Jana Knopová	9.050	9.350	9.000	8.950	9.100	9.300	9.250	9.450	73.450
5	Drahomíra Smolíková	9.000	9.250	9.300	9.200	9.000	9.300	9.150	9.250	73.450
5	Václava Soukupová	9.150	9.200	8.700	9.050	9.000	9.050	9.350	9.500	73.000
5	Zdena Bujňačková	9.150	9.150	9.050	9.150	8.550	9.150	9.150	9.400	72.750
5	Božena Perdykulová	9.400	9.550	8.800	8.900	8.900	8.950	9.050	9.150	72.700
6	Japan	90.450		90.400		89.000		93.050		362.900
6	Nobue Yabe	9.000	9.150	9.000	9.050	8.750	9.150	9.100	9.400	72.600
6	Miyuki Matsuhisa	9.050	9.000	9.150	9.200	9.100	9.050	9.350	8.550	72.450
6	Fusae Hayashida	8.950	9.150	8.900	9.300	8.800	8.550	9.150	9.550	72.350
6	Machiko Ichimura	8.800	9.200	8.700	8.950	9.050	8.850	9.200	9.500	72.250
6	Chieko Kikkawa	8.950	9.150	8.900	9.100	8.600	8.950	9.250	9.250	72.150
6	Kyoko Mano	8.850	8.850	8.800	9.000	8.750	8.400	9.100	9.300	71.050
6	United States	91.000		88.800		88.850		93.350		362.000
6	Joan Moore	9.000	9.000	8.850	8.350	8.900	9.200	9.450	9.700	72.450
6	Diane Dunbar	9.100	9.250	8.950	8.500	8.950	8.900	9.150	9.600	72.400
6	Janette Anderson	8.950	8.950	8.900	9.100	8.900	8.600	9.350	9.100	71.850
6	Debbie Fike	9.100	9.150	8.600	9.050	9.000	8.600	9.250	9.100	71.850
6	Kathy Howard	8.950	9.100	8.800	8.950	8.900	8.900	9.050	9.250	71.900
6	Ann Carr	8.950	9.400	8.750	8.950	8.200	8.500	8.950	9.450	71.150

=== All-around ===
Rank	Gymnast	Score	Prelim score	Total
1st place, gold medalist(s)	Ludmilla Tourischeva (URS)	39.300	39.150	78.450
2nd place, silver medalist(s)	Olga Korbut (URS)	38.750	38.900	77.650
3rd place, bronze medalist(s)	Angelika Hellmann (GDR)	38.650	38.225	76.875
4	Elvira Saadi (URS)	38.550	37.875	76.425
5	Rusudan Sikharulidze (URS)	38.550	37.850	76.400
6	Annelore Zinke (GDR)	38.600	37.725	76.325
7	Nina Dronova (URS)	38.350	37.775	76.125
8	Alina Goreac (ROU)	38.300	37.625	75.925
9	Richarda Schmeißer (GDR)	38.050	37.475	75.525
10	Krisztina Medveczky (HUN)	37.950	37.525	75.475
11	Bärbel Röhrich (GDR)	38.150	37.300	75.450
12	Anca Grigoraș (ROU)	37.800	37.325	75.125
13	Heike Gerisch (GDR)	37.900	37.025	74.925
14	Irene Abel (GDR)	37.150	37.025	74.175
14	Jana Knopová (TCH)	37.450	36.725	74.175
16	Aurelia Dobre (ROU)	37.850	36.300	74.150
16	Zsuzsa Nagy (HUN)	37.200	36.950	74.150
18	Joan Moore (USA)	37.900	36.225	74.125
19	Márta Egervári (HUN)	37.450	36.625	74.075
19	Zdena Dorňáková (TCH)	36.800	37.275	74.075
21	Drahomíra Smolíková (TCH)	37.250	36.725	73.975
22	Mónika Császár (HUN)	36.450	37.375	73.825
23	Uta Schorn (FRG)	37.050	36.525	73.575
23	Zsuzsa Matulai (HUN)	37.000	36.575	73.575
25	Fusae Hayashida (JPN)	37.300	36.175	73.475
26	Diane Dunbar (USA)	37.250	36.200	73.450
27	Božena Perdykulová (TCH)	37.050	36.350	73.400
28	Nobue Yabe (JPN)	37.050	36.300	73.350
29	Elena Ceampelea (ROU)	36.850	36.475	73.325
30	Václava Soukupová (TCH)	36.700	36.500	73.200
31	Ágnes Bánfai (HUN)	36.800	36.325	73.125
32	Rodica Sabău (ROU)	36.250	36.225	72.475
33	Zdena Bujňačková (TCH)	35.900	36.375	72.275
34	Paula Ioan (ROU)	35.300	36.350	71.650
35	Janette Anderson (USA)	35.350	36.150	71.500
36	Miyuki Matsuhisa (JPN)	27.350	36.225	63.575

=== Vault ===
Rank	Gymnast	Total
1st place, gold medalist(s)	Olga Korbut (URS)	19.450
2nd place, silver medalist(s)	Ludmilla Tourischeva (URS)	19.200
3rd place, bronze medalist(s)	Božena Perdykulová (TCH)	19.075
4	Alina Goreac (ROU)	19.025
5	Angelika Hellmann (GDR)	18.850
6	Rusudan Sikharulidze (URS)	17.900

=== Uneven Bars ===
Rank	Gymnast	Total
1st place, gold medalist(s)	Annelore Zinke (GDR)	19.650
2nd place, silver medalist(s)	Olga Korbut (URS)	19.575
3rd place, bronze medalist(s)	Ludmilla Tourischeva (URS)	19.500
4	Angelika Hellmann (GDR)	19.350
5	Richarda Schmeißer (GDR)	19.250
6	Krisztina Medveczky (HUN)	19.050

=== Balance Beam ===
Rank	Gymnast	Total
1st place, gold medalist(s)	Ludmilla Tourischeva (URS)	19.725
2nd place, silver medalist(s)	Olga Korbut (URS)	19.525
3rd place, bronze medalist(s)	Nelli Kim (URS)	19.200
4	Nina Dronova (URS)	19.100
5	Alina Goreac (ROU)	18.900
6	Angelika Hellmann (GDR)	18.625

=== Floor Exercise ===
Rank	Gymnast	Total
1st place, gold medalist(s)	Ludmilla Tourischeva (URS)	19.775
2nd place, silver medalist(s)	Olga Korbut (URS)	19.600
3rd place, bronze medalist(s)	Rusudan Sikharulidze (URS)	19.550
3rd place, bronze medalist(s)	Elvira Saadi (URS)	19.550
5	Nina Dronova (URS)	19.274
6	Angelika Hellmann (GDR)	19.200

== Medals ==
Rank	Nation	Gold	Silver	Bronze	Total
1	Soviet Union (URS)	6	10	5	21
2	Japan (JPN)	5	1	4	10
3	East Germany (GDR)	1	2	2	5
4	Hungary (HUN)	1	0	1	2
5	Romania (ROU)	1	0	0	1
5	West Germany (FRG)	1	0	0	1
7	Poland (POL)	0	0	2	2
8	Bulgaria (BUL)	0	0	1	1
8	Czechoslovakia (TCH)	0	0	1	1
Totals (9 entries)		15	13	16	44
