= Andrey Keranov =

Bulgarian gymnast (born 1955)

- Андрей Керанов
- Born: 20 September 1955 (age 70)
- Height: 165 cm (5 ft 5 in)

Gymnastics career
- Discipline: Men's artistic gymnastics
- Country represented: Bulgaria
Medal record
Men's artistic gymnastics
Representing Bulgaria
World Championships
| Bronze medal – third place | 1974 Varna | Floor exercise |
European Championships
| Bronze medal – third place | 1975 Bern | Floor exercise |

Andrey Keranov (Bulgarian: Андрей Керанов, born 20 September 1955) is a Bulgarian gymnast. He competed at the 1976 Olympic Games but did not qualify for any event finals. He was the first Bulgarian to win a medal at the World Championships, winning bronze on floor exercise in 1974.
