= Vladimir Marchenko (gymnast) =

Russian artistic gymnast

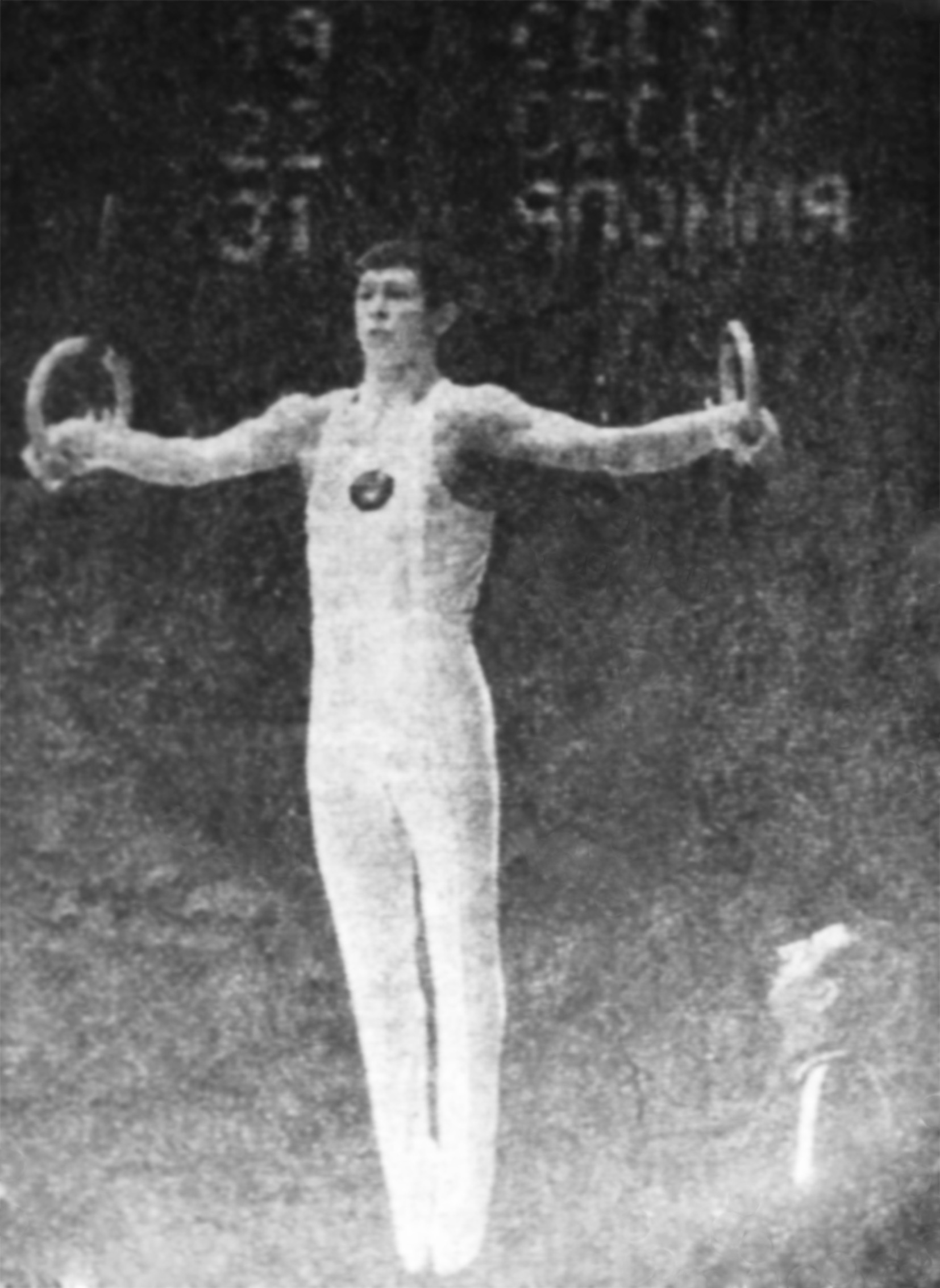
- Вассерман К.Е. с воспитанником Марченко

Personal information
- Born: September 22, 1952 (age 74) Grozny, Russian SFSR, Soviet Union
- Height: 1.60 m (5 ft 3 in)

Gymnastics career
- Discipline: Men's artistic gymnastics
- Country represented: Soviet Union
- Club: Dynamo Grozny
Medal record
Olympic Games
Silver medal – second place	1976 Montreal	Team
Silver medal – second place	1976 Montreal	Floor
World Championships
Silver medal – second place	1974 Varna	Team
Bronze medal – third place	1974 Varna	Parallel bars

Vladimir Nikolayevich Marchenko (Russian: Владимир Николаевич Марченко, born 22 September 1952), is a Russian former gymnast who competed in the 1976 Summer Olympics.
