= Hisato Igarashi =

Japanese gymnast (born 1951)

- 五十嵐 久人
- Born: 19 February 1951 (age 75) Tochigi Prefecture, Japan
- Height: 1.62 m (5 ft 4 in)

Gymnastics career
- Discipline: Men's artistic gymnastics
- Country represented: Japan
Medal record
Men's artistic gymnastics
Representing Japan
Olympic Games
Gold medal – first place	1976 Montreal	Team

Hisato Igarashi (五十嵐 久人, Igarashi Hisato; born February 19, 1951 in Tochigi Prefecture) is a Japanese former gymnast.

He was a member of the Japanese team that won the gold medal at the 1976 Summer Olympics in Montreal.

He is a professor at Niigata University.
