= Božena Perdykulová =

Czech artistic gymnast

Božena Perdykulová (born 29 May 1958 in Stará Bělá, now part of Ostrava) is a Czech former artistic gymnast who represented Czechoslovakia. She won the bronze medal on vault at the 1974 World Championships.
