= Ágnes Bánfai =

Hungarian gymnast (1947–2020)

Personal information
- Born: 8 June 1947 Budapest, Hungary
- Died: 20 August 2020 (aged 65) Budapest
- Height: 1.59 m (5 ft 3 in)
- Weight: 52 kg (115 lb)

Sport
- Sport: Artistic gymnastics
- Club: Budapesti Spartacus SC
Medal record
Representing Hungary
World championships
Bronze medal – third place	1974 Varna	Team

Ágnes Bánfai (8 June 1947 – 20 August 2020) was a Hungarian gymnast. She competed at the 1968 Summer Olympics in all artistic gymnastics events and finished in fifth place in the team competition. Her best individual result was tenth place on the balance beam. She won a bronze medal with the Hungarian team at the 1974 World Artistic Gymnastics Championships.
