= Gymnastics at the 1972 Summer Olympics – Women's uneven bars =

Women's uneven bars at the Games of the XX Olympiad
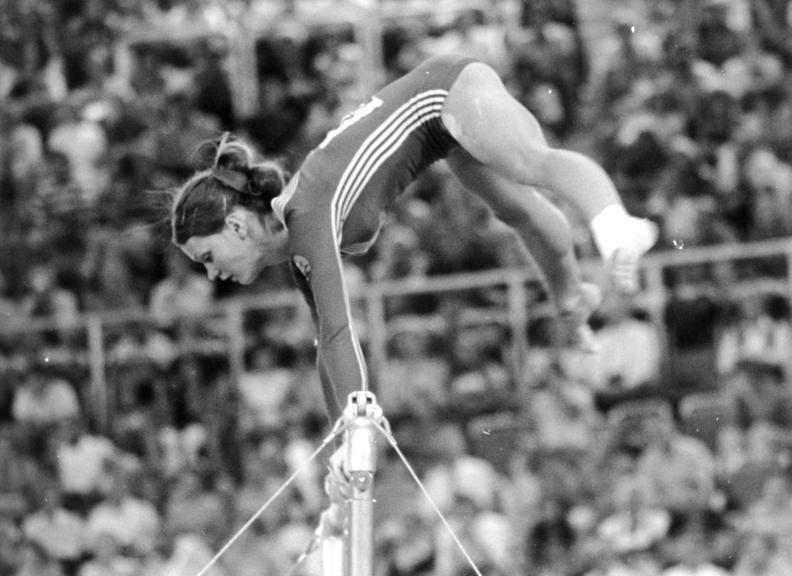
- Karin Janz en route to gold

Medalists
1st place, gold medalist(s)		Karin Janz	East Germany
2nd place, silver medalist(s)		Olga Korbut	Soviet Union
2nd place, silver medalist(s)		Erika Zuchold	East Germany

These are the results of the women's uneven bars competition, one of six events for female competitors in artistic gymnastics at the 1972 Summer Olympics in Munich. The qualification and final rounds took place on August 27, 28 and 31st at the Sports Hall.

== Results ==
=== Qualification ===
One-hundred eighteen gymnasts competed in the compulsory and optional rounds on August 27 and 28. The six highest scoring gymnasts advanced to the final on August 31.

=== Final ===
After the routine of Olga Korbut, for which she received a 9.8, the audience booed in protest believing her score should be higher. Soviet delegation leader Yuri Titov attempted to persuade International Gymnastics Federation President Arthur Gander to change Korbut's score, but was unsuccessful. The next gymnast, Angelika Hellmann, had to perform her routine while the crowd was still booing.

Rank	Gymnast	C	O	Prelim	Final	Total
Gold medal	Karin Janz (GDR)	9.850	9.700	9.775	9.900	19.675
Silver medal	Olga Korbut (URS)	9.600	9.700	9.650	9.800	19.450
Silver medal	Erika Zuchold (GDR)	9.700	9.600	9.650	9.800	19.450
4	Ludmila Tourischeva (URS)	9.600	9.650	9.625	9.800	19.425
5	Ilona Bekesi (HUN)	9.600	9.550	9.575	9.700	19.275
6	Angelika Hellmann (GDR)	9.600	9.500	9.550	9.650	19.200
