= Rusudan Sikharulidze =

Soviet artistic gymnast

Rusudan Sikharulidze is a former artistic gymnast from Georgia, representing the Soviet Union in international competition. She won the bronze medal on floor exercise at the 1974 World Championships.
