= Jiří Tabák =

Czech artistic gymnast

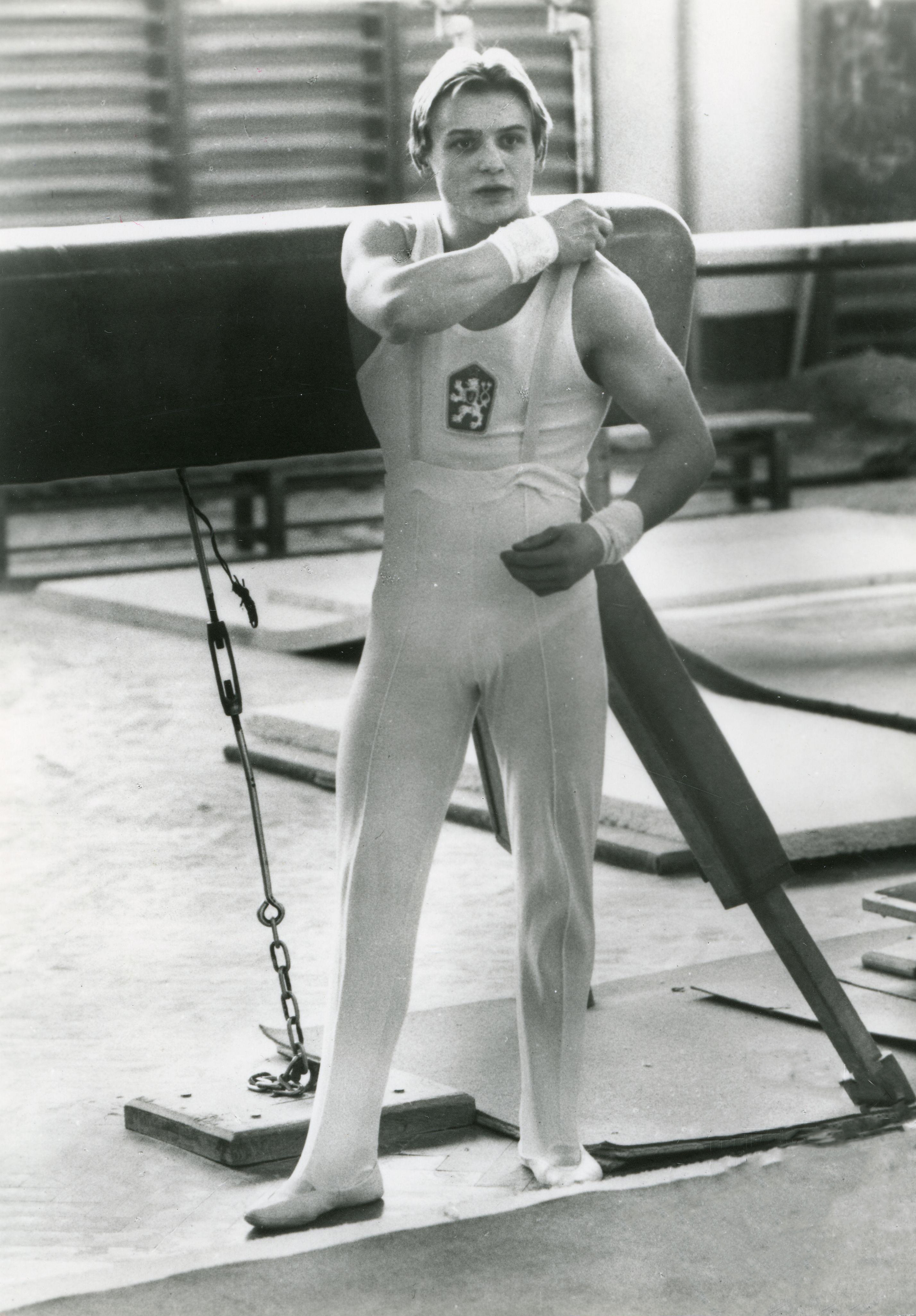
- Tabák in c. 1975

Personal information
- Born: 8 August 1955 (age 71) Karviná, Czechoslovakia
- Height: 1.70 m (5 ft 7 in)

Gymnastics career
- Discipline: Men's artistic gymnastics
- Country represented: Czechoslovakia
Medal record
Men's artistic gymnastics
Representing Czechoslovakia
Olympic Games
Bronze medal – third place	1980 Moscow	Rings
European Championships
Gold medal – first place	1977 Vilnius	Vault
Bronze medal – third place	1975 Bern	Floor exercise
Bronze medal – third place	1975 Bern	Vault

Jiří Tabák (born 8 August 1955) is a Czech retired gymnast. He competed for Czechoslovakia at the 1976 and 1980 Summer Olympics in all artistic gymnastics events and finished in ninth and sixth place with the Czechoslovak team, respectively. Individually he won a bronze medal in the rings and finished fourth in the floor exercise in 1980. Additionally, he is a three-time European individual medalist, including one championship title on Vault, which he won in 1977.
