= Kahla =

- Town
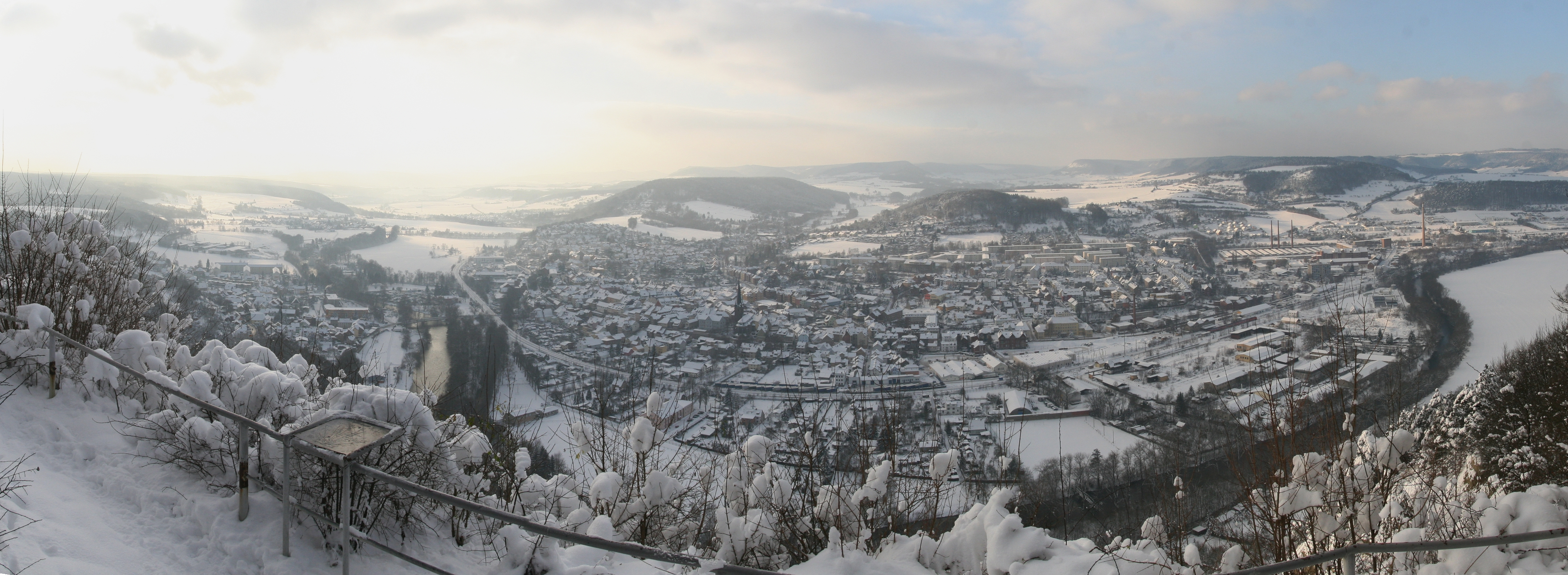
- Kahla in winter

- Coat of arms

- Location of Kahla within Saale-Holzland-Kreis district
- Interactive map of Kahla
- Location within Germany Location within Thuringia
- Coordinates: 50°48′3″N 11°35′15″E
- Country: Germany
- State: Thuringia
- District: Saale-Holzland-Kreis

Government
  - Mayor (2024–30): Jan Schönfeld

Area
  - Total: 7.89 km^{2} (3.05 sq mi)
- Elevation: 177 m (581 ft)

Population (2025-12-31)
  - Total: 6,825
  - Density: 865/km^{2} (2,240/sq mi)
- Time zone: UTC+01:00 (CET)
  - Summer (DST): UTC+02:00 (CEST)
- Postal codes: 07768
- Dialling codes: 036424
- Vehicle registration: SHK, EIS, SRO
- Website: www.kahla.de

Kahla (German: [ˈkaːla]) is a town in the Saale-Holzland district, in Thuringia, Germany. It is situated on the river Saale, 14 km south of Jena.

== Mayors ==
- 1990–2012: Bernd Leube
- 2012–2018: Claudia Nissen
- 2018–incumbent: Jan Schönfeld

=== People who were born in Kahla ===
- Johann Walter (1496-1570), composer, song poet, advisor for Martin Luther for church singing
- Paul Rudolph (physicist) (1858-1935), physicist
- Bernd Jäger (born 1951), gymnast
