= Zsuzsa Nagy (gymnast) =

Hungarian artistic gymnast

Personal information
- Born: 14 November 1951 (age 74) Budapest, Hungary
- Height: 1.72 m (5 ft 8 in)
- Weight: 66 kg (146 lb)

Sport
- Sport: Artistic gymnastics
- Club: Postás SE, Budapest
Medal record
Representing Hungary
Olympic Games
Bronze medal – third place	1972 Munich	Team
World championships
Bronze medal – third place	1974 Varna	Team

Zsuzsanna "Zsuzsa" Nagy (born 14 November 1951) is a retired Hungarian gymnast. She competed at the 1972 Summer Olympics in all of the artistic gymnastics events and won a bronze medal in the team competition. Her best individual result was 34th place on the balance beam. She won another bronze team medal at the 1974 World Artistic Gymnastics Championships.
