= Bernd Jäger =

East German gymnast

- Born: 18 November 1951 (age 74) Kahla, East Germany
- Height: 1.60 m (5 ft 3 in)

Gymnastics career
- Discipline: Men's artistic gymnastics
- Country represented: East Germany
- Club: ASK Vorwärts Potsdam
- Eponymous skills: Jaeger (gymnastics)
Medal record
Olympic Games
Bronze medal – third place	1976 Montreal	Team
World Championships
Bronze medal – third place	1974 Varna	Team

Bernd Jäger (born 18 November 1951 in Kahla) is a former East German gymnast who competed in the 1976 Summer Olympics.

At the 1974 World Artistic Gymnastics Championships in Varna, Bulgaria, competing on the horizontal bar, he first performed his forward somersault starting from a forward giant and ending in a backward swing, later named Jägersalto. With this element, Jäger started the worldwide development of release elements on high bar, followed by innovations by Eberhard Gienger, Stoyan Delchev and others.
