= Hiroshi Kajiyama (gymnast) =

Japanese artistic gymnast

- 梶山 広司
- Born: 13 June 1953 (age 73) Kanagawa Prefecture, Japan
- Height: 1.59 m (5 ft 3 in)

Gymnastics career
- Discipline: Men's artistic gymnastics
- Country represented: Japan
Medal record
Men's artistic gymnastics
Representing Japan
Olympic Games
Gold medal – first place	1976 Montreal	Team
Bronze medal – third place	1976 Montreal	Vault
World Championships
Gold medal – first place	1974 Varna	Team
Gold medal – first place	1978 Strasbourg	Team
Silver medal – second place	1974 Varna	Floor
Silver medal – second place	1978 Strasbourg	Parallel bars
Silver medal – second place	1979 Fort Worth	Team

Hiroshi Kajiyama (梶山 広司, Kajiyama Hiroshi; born 13 June 1953) is a Japanese former gymnast who competed in the 1976 Summer Olympics.
