= Mihai Borș =

Romanian gymnast

- Born: 11 January 1951 (age 75) Bucharest, Romanian People's Republic
- Height: 1.71 m (5 ft 7 in)

Gymnastics career
- Discipline: Men's artistic gymnastics
- Country represented: Romania
Medal record
European Championships
Silver medal – second place	1975 Bern	Rings

Mihai Borș (born 11 January 1951) is a Romanian gymnast. He competed in eight events at the 1976 Summer Olympics.
