= Mónika Császár =

Hungarian gymnast (born 1954)

Personal information
- Born: 17 November 1954 (age 71) Budapest, Hungary
- Height: 1.66 m (5 ft 5 in)
- Weight: 55 kg (121 lb)

Sport
- Sport: Artistic gymnastics
- Club: Postás SE, Budapest
Medal record
Representing Hungary
Olympic Games
Bronze medal – third place	1972 Munich	Team
World championships
Bronze medal – third place	1974 Varna	Team

Mónika Császár (born 17 November 1954) is a retired Hungarian gymnast. She competed at the 1972 Summer Olympics in all artistic gymnastics events and won a bronze medal in the team competition. Her best individual result was fourth place on the balance beam. She won another bronze team medal at the 1974 World Artistic Gymnastics Championships.

She married András Balczó, an Olympic pentathlete.
