= Rainer Hanschke =

German former gymnast (born 1951)

- Born: 22 December 1951 (age 74) Finsterwalde, East Germany
- Height: 1.73 m (5 ft 8 in)

Gymnastics career
- Discipline: Men's artistic gymnastics
- Country represented: East Germany
Medal record
Olympic Games
Bronze medal – third place	1976 Montreal	Team
World Championships
Bronze medal – third place	1974 Varna	Team

Rainer Hanschke (born 22 December 1951 in Finsterwalde) is a German former gymnast who competed in the 1976 Summer Olympics.
