= Krisztina Medveczky =

Hungarian artistic gymnast

Personal information
- Born: 14 April 1958 (age 68) Budapest, Hungary
- Height: 1.60 m (5 ft 3 in)
- Weight: 49 kg (108 lb)

Sport
- Sport: Artistic gymnastics
- Club: Vasas, Budapest
Medal record
Representing Hungary
Olympic Games
| Bronze medal – third place | 1972 Munich | Team |
World championships
| Bronze medal – third place | 1974 Varna | Team |

Krisztina Medveczky (born 14 April 1958) is a retired Hungarian gymnast. She competed at the 1972 and 1976 Summer Olympics in all artistic gymnastics events and finished in third and fourth place in the team competition, respectively. Her best individual result was ninth place on the balance beam in 1972. She won another bronze team medal at the 1974 World Artistic Gymnastics Championships.

At the 1976 Olympics in Montreal, she met a researcher in pharmaceutical chemistry. They soon married and she followed him to several countries, including the UK and Australia. They have three daughters, Adrienn, Alexandra and Bettina, who live in Brisbane and Sydney, Australia.
