= Karin Büttner-Janz =

German gymnast

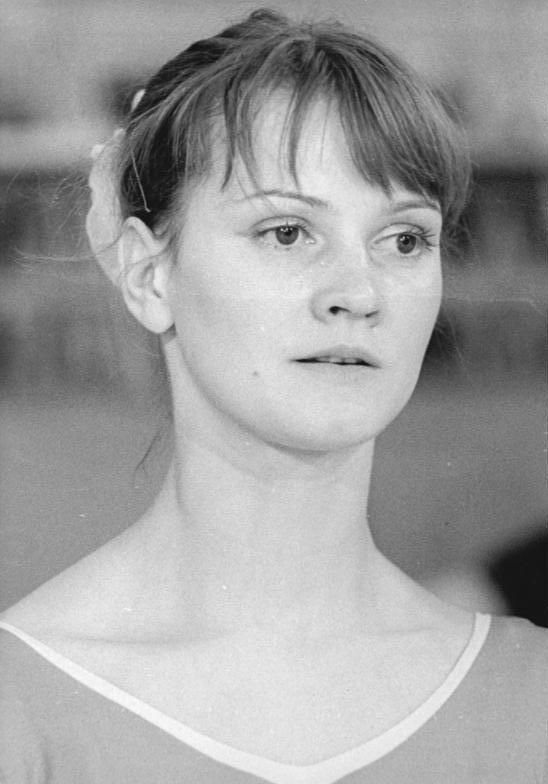
- Büttner-Janz in 1972

Personal information
- Born: 17 February 1952 (age 74) Lübben, East Germany
- Height: 1.56 m (5 ft 1 in)

Gymnastics career
- Discipline: Women's artistic gymnastics
- Country represented: East Germany; (1967–1972)
- Club: SC Dynamo Berlin
- Retired: 1972
Medal record
Women's artistic gymnastics
Representing East Germany
Olympic Games
Gold medal – first place	1972 Munich	Vault
Gold medal – first place	1972 Munich	Uneven bars
Silver medal – second place	1968 Mexico City	Uneven bars
Silver medal – second place	1972 Munich	All-around
Silver medal – second place	1972 Munich	Team
Bronze medal – third place	1968 Mexico City	Team
Bronze medal – third place	1972 Munich	Balance beam
World Championships
Gold medal – first place	1970 Ljubljana	Uneven bars
Silver medal – second place	1970 Ljubljana	Team competition
Silver medal – second place	1970 Ljubljana	Vault
European Championships
Gold medal – first place	1969 Landskrona	All-around
Gold medal – first place	1969 Landskrona	Uneven bars
Gold medal – first place	1969 Landskrona	Vault
Gold medal – first place	1969 Landskrona	Balance beam
Silver medal – second place	1967 Amsterdam	Uneven bars
Silver medal – second place	1969 Landskrona	Floor exercise
Bronze medal – third place	1967 Amsterdam	Vault

Karin Büttner-Janz (née Janz, born 17 February 1952) is a German medical doctor and former gymnast who won World and Olympic gold medals in artistic gymnastics for East Germany. She is co-inventor of the first artificial intervertebral disc, and from 1990 to 2012, she was chief physician of clinics in Berlin, Germany. She has a foundation named Spinefoundation.

== Gymnastics career ==
Büttner-Janz began training in gymnastics when she was five. Her first coach was her father, Guido Janz. Büttner-Janz moved to a sports school in Forst when she was 10, where she boarded during the week and visited her parents on weekends; she later said "that was not good at this age". She moved to a training center in Berlin in 1966. She trained under Klaus Helbeck, and her final coach was Jürgen Heritz.

At 14, she became the East German champion.

In 1967, at the age of 15, Büttner-Janz was nominated as East German Athlete of the Year after a silver medal on the uneven bars and a bronze medal on the vault at the European championship in Amsterdam. She went on to win the silver medal on the uneven bars and a bronze medal as part of the country's gymnastics team at the 1968 Summer Olympics.

At the 1970 world championships, she overcame Ludmilla Tourischeva on the uneven bars to win the gold medal. In a controversial finish, she delivered another gold medal-winning performance on the uneven bars, her best apparatus, at the 1972 Munich Olympics, defeating Olga Korbut; the audience protested her score for ten minutes. She also won the gold medal on the vault, a silver medal as part of the East German women's gymnastics team, another silver medal in the all-around competition behind Ludmilla Tourischeva and ahead of Tamara Lazakovich, and bronze on the balance beam.

She was the most successful German athlete at the 1972 Summer Olympics in Munich and was afterwards recognized as GDR (German Democratic Republic) Sportswoman of the Year in 1972. After these successes, she announced her intention of ending her competitive career to turn to the study of medicine to become a physician.

Büttner-Janz has an uneven bars element named after her, the Janz Salto, which she first performed in competition at the SV Dynamo Spartakiade in East Berlin, 1971.

== Academic physician ==
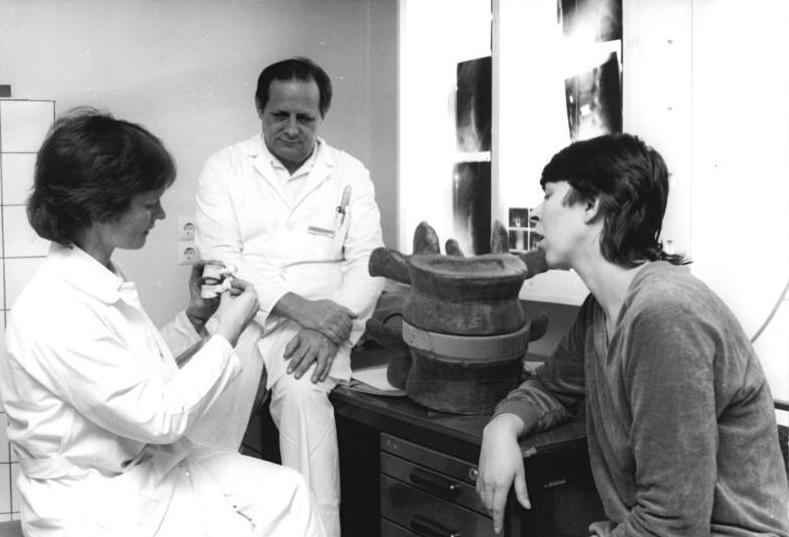
Karin Büttner-Janz (left) and Kurt Schellnack (center) developed the artificial spine disk Charité Disc in the 1980s

Büttner-Janz studied at the Humboldt University in East Berlin beginning in 1971, when she was still competing, and earned her degree in human medicine, with her thesis examining emergency medicine. Later, she conducted her clinical semester at the orthopedic hospital of the Charité and went on to specialize in orthopaedics. She obtained her postdoctoral lecture qualification (habilitation treatise) through her work on the development of the first artificial spinal disc, known as the Charité Disc. She developed the device together with her colleague Kurt Schellnack.

In 1990, Büttner-Janz moved from the Charité Berlin to the orthopedic clinic of Berlin-Hellersdorf, then in 2001 to the Vivantes clinic of Berlin-Friedrichshain. From 2008 to 2012, she was Chief Physician of trauma surgery and orthopaedics at the Vivantes clinic in Berlin-Kreuzberg.

Büttner-Janz was often in conflict with other employees at the clinic, who felt she was authoritarian and disliked demands she made, such as not allowing patients from other departments to be moved through the orthopaedics ward, which she said was against regulations and unhygienic for her patients. In 2011, she entered a relationship with Dorothea Dreizehnter, a managing director at the clinic. Other chief physicians at the clinic accused her of using the relationship for unfair treatment, although no evidence for this was ever presented.

In March 2012, she was told that she was being put on leave of absence. When she contacted the supervisory board of the company, saying that she was dismissed from her position as Chief Physician due to her relationship with Dreizehnter, her superior banned her from the hospital and dismissed her immediately. Büttner-Janz filed a lawsuit over her dismissal and alleged discrimination due to her same-sex relationship; both sides agreed to a settlement, from which she received the amount of her annual salary and an unusually large settlement of €590,000, which her lawyer suggested was due to the groundless nature of her dismissal. Several of her colleagues resigned from the hospital as well.

In 2012, she began a foundation named Spinefoundation, which is focused on scientific research and public awareness of spinal issues.

In 2005, she became a professor of orthopaedics at the Charité-Unviversitätsmedizin Berlin. From 2008 to 2009 she was president of the Spine Arthroplasty Society (later renamed to International Society for the Advancement of Spine Surgery).

From 2014 to 2016, she studied at the Hochschule für Technik und Wirtschaft Berlin and became Master of Business Administration (MBA) in general management.

== Honours ==
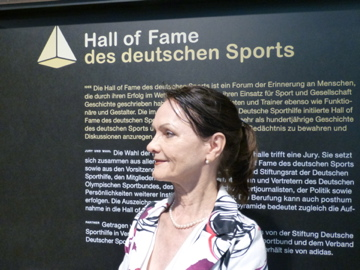
Büttner-Janz in Leipzig, 2017

- 1972 – awarded the title of Merited Master of Sport of the USSR.
- 2003 – inducted into the International Gymnastics Hall of Fame.
- 2011 – inducted into the Germany's Sports Hall of Fame

== Competition history ==
Year	Event	Team	AA	VT	UB	BB	FX
1965	Druzhba		2nd place, silver medalist(s)	2nd place, silver medalist(s)	1st place, gold medalist(s)	2nd place, silver medalist(s)	
1966	Druzhba	1st place, gold medalist(s)	1st place, gold medalist(s)	2nd place, silver medalist(s)	1st place, gold medalist(s)	3rd place, bronze medalist(s)	
1967	DTV Cup		1st place, gold medalist(s)				
1967	GDR-ROM Dual Meet	1st place, gold medalist(s)	1st place, gold medalist(s)				
1967	GDR-POL Dual Meet	1st place, gold medalist(s)	1st place, gold medalist(s)				
1967	GDR-SWE Dual Meet	1st place, gold medalist(s)	3rd place, bronze medalist(s)				
1967	GDR-USSR Dual Meet	1st place, gold medalist(s)	2nd place, silver medalist(s)	1st place, gold medalist(s)			
1967	GDR Club Championships	1st place, gold medalist(s)	2nd place, silver medalist(s)				
1967	GDR Championships		1st place, gold medalist(s)	2nd place, silver medalist(s)	1st place, gold medalist(s)	2nd place, silver medalist(s)	3rd place, bronze medalist(s)
1967	European Championships		4	3rd place, bronze medalist(s)	2nd place, silver medalist(s)	4	
1967	Pre-Olympics		7				
1968	DTV Cup	1st place, gold medalist(s)	2nd place, silver medalist(s)				
1968	GDR-BUL Dual Meet	1st place, gold medalist(s)	2nd place, silver medalist(s)				
1968	GDR-FRA Dual Meet	1st place, gold medalist(s)	1st place, gold medalist(s)				
1968	GDR-SWE Dual Meet	1st place, gold medalist(s)	2nd place, silver medalist(s)				
1968	GDR Championships		2nd place, silver medalist(s)	1st place, gold medalist(s)	1st place, gold medalist(s)	6	2nd place, silver medalist(s)
1968	Olympic Games	3rd place, bronze medalist(s)	6		2nd place, silver medalist(s)	4	
1969	DTV Cup		1st place, gold medalist(s)	1st place, gold medalist(s)	1st place, gold medalist(s)	1st place, gold medalist(s)	1st place, gold medalist(s)
1969	GDR-SWE Dual Meet	1st place, gold medalist(s)	1st place, gold medalist(s)	2nd place, silver medalist(s)	1st place, gold medalist(s)	1st place, gold medalist(s)	1st place, gold medalist(s)
1969	GDR-JPN Dual Meet	1st place, gold medalist(s)	1st place, gold medalist(s)	1st place, gold medalist(s)	1st place, gold medalist(s)	1st place, gold medalist(s)	1st place, gold medalist(s)
1969	GDR-USSR-ROM Meet	1st place, gold medalist(s)	2nd place, silver medalist(s)	1st place, gold medalist(s)	1st place, gold medalist(s)	1st place, gold medalist(s)	2nd place, silver medalist(s)
1969	GDR Championships		1st place, gold medalist(s)	1st place, gold medalist(s)	1st place, gold medalist(s)	1st place, gold medalist(s)	1st place, gold medalist(s)
1969	European Championships		1st place, gold medalist(s)	1st place, gold medalist(s)	1st place, gold medalist(s)		2nd place, silver medalist(s)
1970	USSR-GDR Dual Meet	2nd place, silver medalist(s)	2nd place, silver medalist(s)	1st place, gold medalist(s)	1st place, gold medalist(s)	2nd place, silver medalist(s)	2nd place, silver medalist(s)
1970	GDR Championships		1st place, gold medalist(s)				
1970	World Championships	2nd place, silver medalist(s)	4	2nd place, silver medalist(s)	1st place, gold medalist(s)		4
1971	Dynamo Spartakiade	1st place, gold medalist(s)	1st place, gold medalist(s)	1st place, gold medalist(s)	1st place, gold medalist(s)	1st place, gold medalist(s)	1st place, gold medalist(s)
1972
1972	Olympic Games	2nd place, silver medalist(s)	2nd place, silver medalist(s)	1st place, gold medalist(s)	1st place, gold medalist(s)	3rd place, bronze medalist(s)	4
1972	Chunichi Cup		1st place, gold medalist(s)				

== See also ==
- List of top Olympic gymnastics medalists

Awards
Preceded by (East Germany) Gabriele Seyfert	East German Sportswoman of the Year; 1967	Succeeded by (East Germany) Margitta Gummel
Preceded by (East Germany) Karin Balzer	East German Sportswoman of the Year; 1972	Succeeded by (East Germany) Kornelia Ender
