= Armin Vock =

Swiss gymnast

- Born: 29 November 1952 (age 73) Thalwil, Switzerland
- Height: 1.67 m (5 ft 6 in)

Gymnastics career
- Discipline: Men's artistic gymnastics
- Country represented: Switzerland

Armin Vock (born 29 November 1952) is a Swiss gymnast. He competed in eight events at the 1976 Summer Olympics.
