= Edvard Mikaelian =

Soviet Armenian artistic gymnast (born 1950)

- Born: 25 May 1950 (age 76) Yerevan, Armenian SSR, Soviet Union
- Height: 5 ft 5 in (165 cm)

Gymnastics career
- Discipline: Men's artistic gymnastics
- Country represented: Soviet Union
Medal record
Olympic Games
Silver medal – second place	1972 Munich	Team competition
World Championships
Silver medal – second place	1974 Varna	Team competition

Edvard Mikaelian (Armenian: Էդվարդ Միքայելյան, born 25 May 1950 in Yerevan, Armenian SSR) is a former Soviet Armenian artistic gymnast. He was awarded the Master of Sport of the USSR, International Class title in 1972.

Mikaelian started gymnastics in 1960 under the direction of the honored coach of the Armenian SSR, Leonid Zakharyan. He was a member of the USSR national gymnastics team from 1967 to 1974. During that time, Mikaelian competed at the 1972 Summer Olympics in Munich. He participated in every artistic gymnastics event and was a member of the silver medal-winning team in the Team All-Around. He also competed at the 1974 World Artistic Gymnastics Championships in Varna, where the Soviet team once again won a silver medal. In 1976, he completed his career.

Mikaelian later engaged in coaching. From 1993 to 1994, he was the head coach of the Armenian national gymnastics team.

== Personal life ==
Edvard's younger brother, Ruben, was also a gymnast who became a USSR Champion on the pommel horse in 1975.
