= Peter Rohner =

Swiss gymnast

- Born: 12 April 1949 (age 77) St. Gallen, Switzerland
- Height: 1.71 m (5 ft 7 in)

Gymnastics career
- Discipline: Men's artistic gymnastics
- Country represented: Switzerland
- Gym: Turnverein St. Margrethen

Peter Rohner (born 12 April 1949) is a Swiss gymnast. He competed at the 1968 Summer Olympics, the 1972 Summer Olympics and the 1976 Summer Olympics.
