= Jürgen Paeke =

East German gymnast

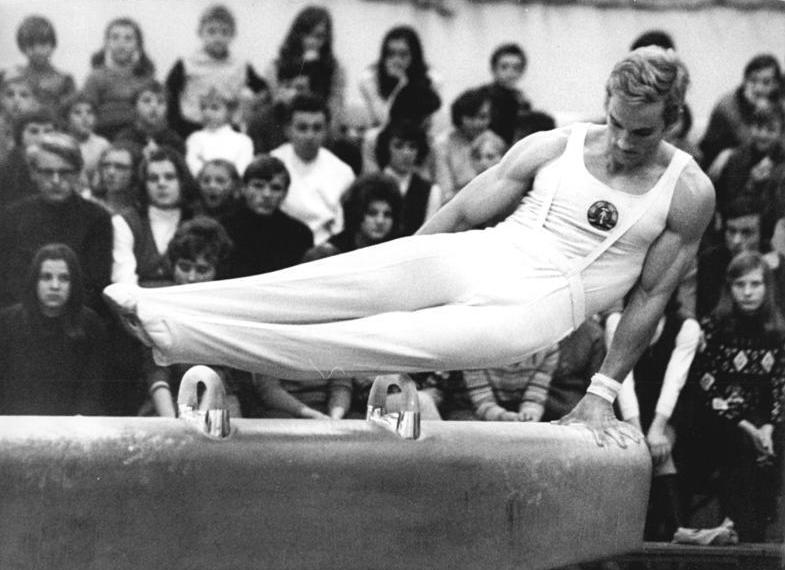
- Paeke in 1972

Personal information
- Born: 13 September 1948 (age 78) Biesenthal, Soviet occupation zone in Germany
- Height: 1.69 m (5 ft 7 in)

Gymnastics career
- Discipline: Men's artistic gymnastics
- Country represented: East Germany
- Club: SC Dynamo Berlin
Medal record
Men's artistic gymnastics
Representing East Germany
Olympic Games
Bronze medal – third place	1972 Munich	Team

Jürgen Paeke (born 13 September 1948, in Biesenthal) is a German gymnast who competed for the SC Dynamo Berlin / Sportvereinigung (SV) Dynamo.
