= Elvira Saadi =

Soviet-Uzbek artistic gymnast (born 1952)

- Born: January 2, 1952 (age 74) Tashkent, Uzbek SSR, Soviet Union
- Height: 1.66 m (5 ft 5 1/2 in)

Gymnastics career
- Discipline: Women's artistic gymnastics
- Country represented: Soviet Union
- Retired: Yes
Medal record
Representing Soviet Union
Olympic Games
| Gold medal – first place | 1972 Munich | Team |
| Gold medal – first place | 1976 Montreal | Team |
World Championships
| Gold medal – first place | 1974 Varna | Team |
| Bronze medal – third place | 1974 Varna | Floor exercise |

Elvira Fuadovna Saadi (born January 2, 1952) is a retired gymnast from the former Soviet Union and a former elite gymnastics coach in Canada.

As a member of the Soviet Union's women's gymnastics team, Saadi shared in the team gold medals at the 1972 and 1976 Olympics. She placed 8th in the all-around at the 1972 Olympics and 7th all-around at the 1976 Olympics.

Saadi won the all-around, balance beam and floor exercise at the 1973 USSR national championships. That year, she tied for first on vault at the 1973 World University Games, where she also placed 3rd in the all-around.

At the 1974 World Championships, she earned a share of the USSR team gold, placed fourth in the all-around and captured the bronze medal on floor exercise.

Following the 1976 Olympics, Saadi accepted a coaching position at the Moscow Dynamo Club, where she was the coach of Soviet gymnast Tatiana Groshkova, who placed third all-around in the 1989 U.S.S.R. gymnastics championships and placed first all-around at the 1990 Trophee Massilia.

Saadi was born in Tashkent, U.S.S.R. She relocated to Canada in 1991 to become a coach at the Canadian gym Cambridge Kips, where she trained Canadian Olympians Yvonne Tousek and Crystal Gilmore.

In June 2011, Saadi announced plans to open her own club, Dynamo Gymnastics. The new club begun operations on the premises of Revolution Gymnastics in Waterloo, where several top young gymnasts who left Cambridge Kips with Saadi trained. Dynamo Gymnastics opened in Cambridge, Ontario, Canada in 2011. Saadi opened the new club together with the parents of one of the up-and-coming gymnasts, Victoria Moors, who left Cambridge Kips with Saadi. Along with Victoria Moors was Madeline Gardiner. Both Gardiner and Moors went on to qualify for the Canadian London 2012 Olympic team. Moors competed as part of Team Canada and helped to earn Canada 5th place overall in the team final, the best ranking of any Canadian Women's Artistic Gymnastics team to date at the Olympics. Gardiner was an alternate on the team but did not compete. Moors was also the youngest Canadian Olympian competing at the age of 15. Victoria went on to briefly hold the record for a Canadian Women's Artistic Gymnast at the 2013 World Artistic Gymnastics Championships in Antwerp, Belgium, in 2013, placing 10th for Canada. The previous best ranking for a Canadian was 14th. (That 10th-place ranking has since been beaten at the 2017 World Artistic Gymnastics Championships by Halifax's Ellie Black (Moors' teammate at the London Olympics). Victoria also has two eponymous skills, one a dismount from the uneven bars and the other a laid-out double-twisting double somersault on floor which is the hardest ranking floor skill to date. Victoria retired at the age of 18 in the spring of 2015. Victoria's sister Brooklyn Moors, also coached by Saadi, is a member of the Canadian national team and represented Canada at the 2017 World Artistic Gymnastics Championships and the 2018 World Artistic Gymnastics Championships.

On November 20, 2023, Saadi was permanently banned by Gymnastics Canada from working with gymnasts due to physical and verbal abuse. She appealed the ban, but on June 24, 2024, the Sport Dispute Resolution Centre of Canada denied her appeal.
