= Richarda Schmeißer =

East German artistic gymnast

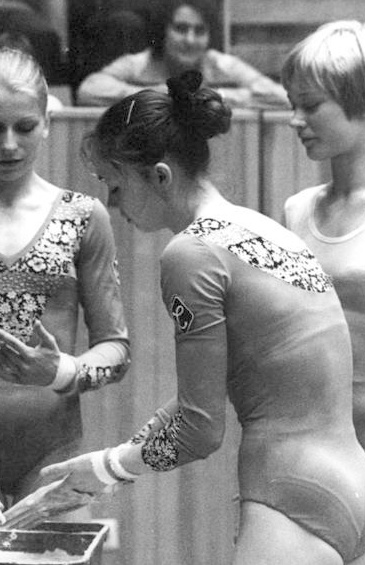
- Richarda Schmeißer in 1976

Personal information
- Born: 20 August 1954 (age 72) Zeitz, Bezirk Halle, East Germany
- Height: 1.58 m (5 ft 2 in)

Gymnastics career
- Discipline: Women's artistic gymnastics
- Club: SV Halle
Medal record
Representing East Germany
Olympic Games
Silver medal – second place	1972 Munich	Team
World Championships
Silver medal – second place	1970 Ljubljana	Team
Silver medal – second place	1974 Varna	Team
European Championships
Silver medal – second place	1975 Skien	Vault

Richarda Schmeißer (later Richarda Hartmann; born 20 August 1954) is a retired German former gymnast. She competed at the 1972 Summer Olympics in all artistic gymnastics events and won a silver medal with the East German team. Her best personal result was eighth place in the uneven bars. She won three more silver medals at the world championships in 1970 and 1974 (team competition) and at the 1975 European championships (vault).
