= Wolfgang Thüne =

East German gymnast

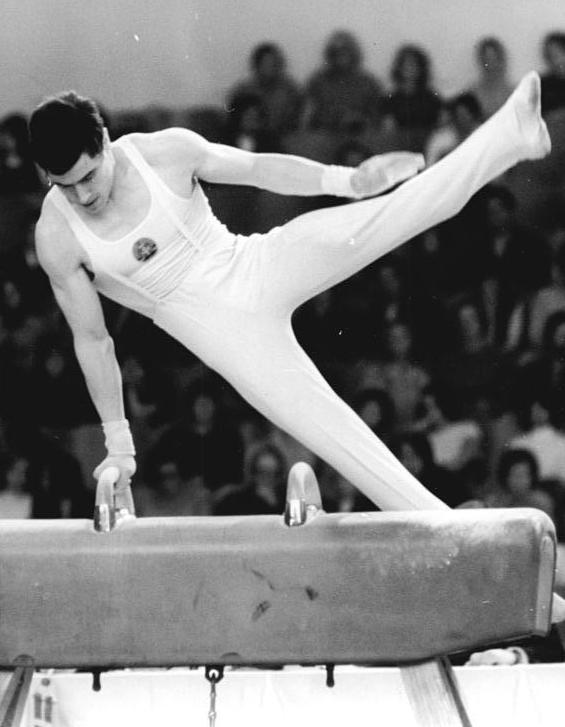
- Thüne in 1974

Personal information
- Born: 8 October 1949 (age 77) Heilbad Heiligenstadt, East Germany
- Height: 1.70 m (5 ft 7 in)

Gymnastics career
- Discipline: Men's artistic gymnastics
- Country represented: East Germany
- Club: Armeesportklub Vorwärts Potsdam, TuS 04 Leverkusen
Medal record
Men's artistic gymnastics
Representing East Germany
Olympic Games
Bronze medal – third place	1972 Munich	Team
World Championships
Silver medal – second place	1974 Varna	Horizontal bar
Bronze medal – third place	1970 Ljubljana	Team
Bronze medal – third place	1974 Varna	Team
European Championships
Bronze medal – third place	1973 Grenoble	Horizontal bar

Wolfgang Thüne (born 8 October 1949) is a German former gymnast. He competed at the 1972 Summer Olympics in all artistic gymnastics events and won a bronze medal with the East German team. Individually his best achievement was seventh place in the horizontal bar. He won two more bronze team medals at the world championships in 1970 and 1974 as well as individual silver in the horizontal bar in 1974. At the 1975 European Championships in Bern, he fled to West Germany with the help of his rival Eberhard Gienger. In 1977 he won the national all-round title in West Germany competing for TuS 04 Leverkusen. After retirement, he worked as a gymnastics coach at the same club.
