= Irene Abel =

East German gymnast (born 1953)

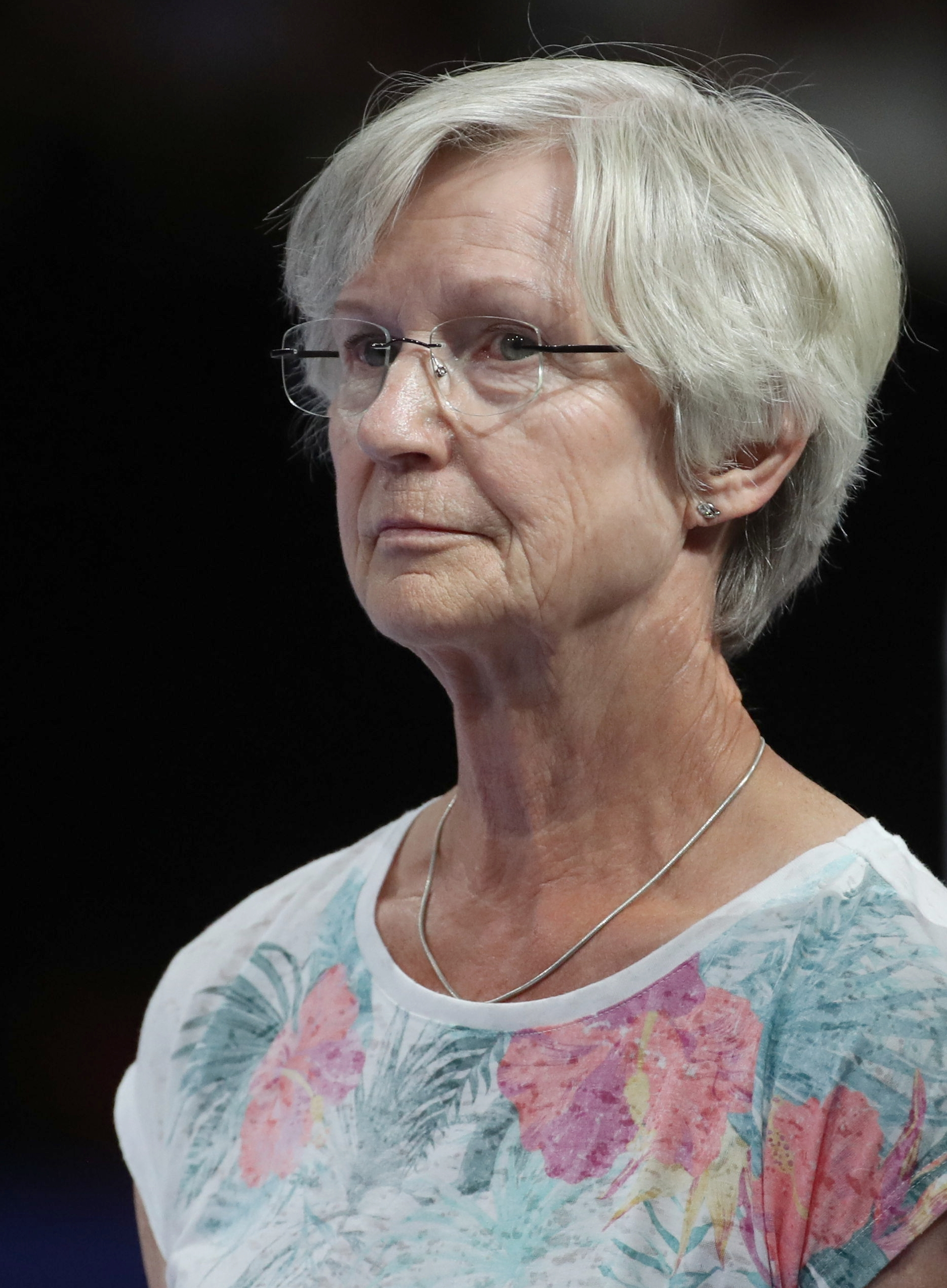
- Abel in 2022

Personal information
- Born: 12 February 1953 (age 73) East Berlin, East Germany
- Height: 1.60 m (5 ft 3 in)

Gymnastics career
- Discipline: Women's artistic gymnastics
- Club: SC Dynamo Berlin
Medal record
Representing East Germany
Olympic Games
Silver medal – second place	1972 Munich	Team
World Championships
Silver medal – second place	1974 Varna	Team

Irene Abel (born 12 February 1953) is a retired German artistic gymnast. She competed in the 1972 Summer Olympics and won a silver medal with the East German team. Her best individual result was seventh place in the vault. She won another silver team medal at the 1974 World Championships.

After retiring from competitions she worked as gymnastics coach at her club Dynamo Berlin. She also trains her daughter Katja (born 1983), who competed at the 2008 Olympics.
