= Imre Molnár =

Hungarian gymnast (1949–2019)

- Born: 30 March 1949 Miskolc, Hungarian People's Republic
- Died: 26 September 2019 (aged 70) Budapest, Hungary
- Height: 1.63 m (5 ft 4 in)

Gymnastics career
- Discipline: Men's artistic gymnastics
- Country represented: Hungary
- Club: Budapesti Honvéd Sportegyesület, Testnevelési Főiskola Sport Egylet, Újpesti Tornaegylet
Medal record
Representing Hungary
European Championships
| Bronze medal – third place | 1973 Grenoble | Vault |

Imre Molnár (30 March 1949 – 26 September 2019) was a Hungarian gymnast. He competed at the 1972 and the 1976 Summer Olympics.
