= Wolfgang Klotz =

East German gymnast

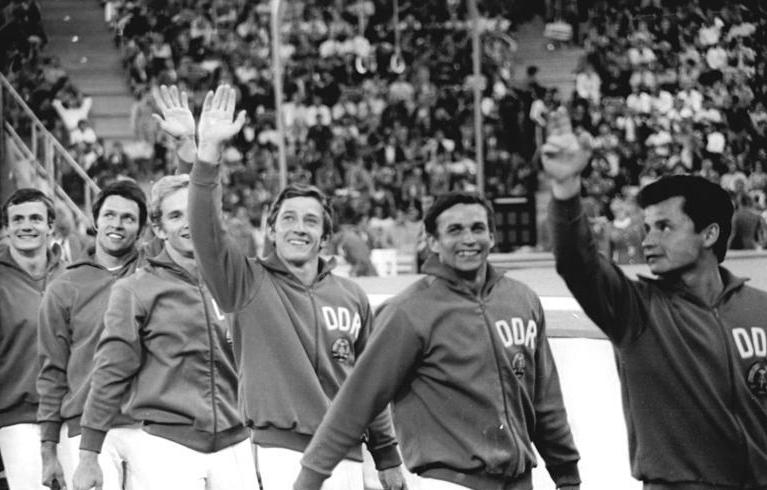
- Klotz (far left) and the East German team at the 1972 Summer Olympics

Personal information
- Born: 4 November 1951 (age 74) Torgau, East Germany
- Height: 1.69 m (5 ft 7 in)

Gymnastics career
- Discipline: Men's artistic gymnastics
- Country represented: East Germany
- Club: ASV Vorwärts Potsdam
Medal record
Men's artistic gymnastics
Representing East Germany
Olympic Games
Bronze medal – third place	1972 Munich	Team
Bronze medal – third place	1976 Montreal	Team
World Championships
Bronze medal – third place	1974 Varna	Team

Wolfgang Klotz (born 4 November 1951) is a German former gymnast. He competed at the 1972 and 1976 Summer Olympics in all artistic gymnastics events and won two bronze medals with the East German team. Individually, his best achievement was 14th place in the floor exercise in 1972. He won one more bronze team medal at the 1974 World Artistic Gymnastics Championships.
