= Angelika Hellmann =

German gymnast (born 1954)

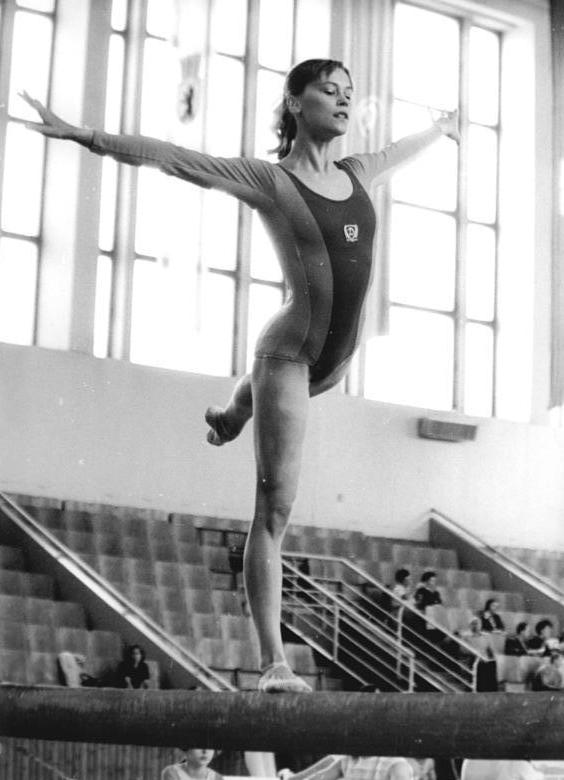
- Hellmann in 1974

Personal information
- Born: 10 April 1954 (age 72) Halle (Saale), East Germany
- Height: 1.63 m (5 ft 4 in)
- Weight: 47 kg (104 lb)

Sport
- Sport: Artistic gymnastics
- Club: SC Dynamo Berlin
Medal record
Representing East Germany
Olympic Games
Silver medal – second place	1972 Munich	Team
Bronze medal – third place	1976 Montreal	Team
World Championships
Silver medal – second place	1970 Ljubljana	Team
Silver medal – second place	1974 Varna	Team
Bronze medal – third place	1974 Varna	All-around
European Championships
Gold medal – first place	1973 London	Vault
Silver medal – second place	1973 London	Uneven bars
Bronze medal – third place	1971 Minsk	Uneven bars

Angelika Hellmann (later Keilig, born 10 April 1954) is a retired German gymnast. She competed at the 1972 and 1976. Summerand won a silver and a bronze medal in the team competitions, respectively. Her best individual results were fifth place in the floor exercise in 1972 and on the balance beam in 1976. She won two more silver medals with the East German team in 1970 and 1974, and an individual all-around bronze at the world championships in 1974. At the European championships, she won three medals in 1971 and 1973, in the vault and uneven bars.

Her father Rudi Hellmann was an East German sports official. She retired shortly after the 1976 Olympics and in 1979 began coaching at her club SC Dynamo Berlin. Later she became the head choreographer for the East German women's team (floor exercise). After retirement from coaching she worked as a fitness instructor at a hotel in Zinnowitz, Germany.
