= Eizo Kenmotsu =

Japanese artistic gymnast

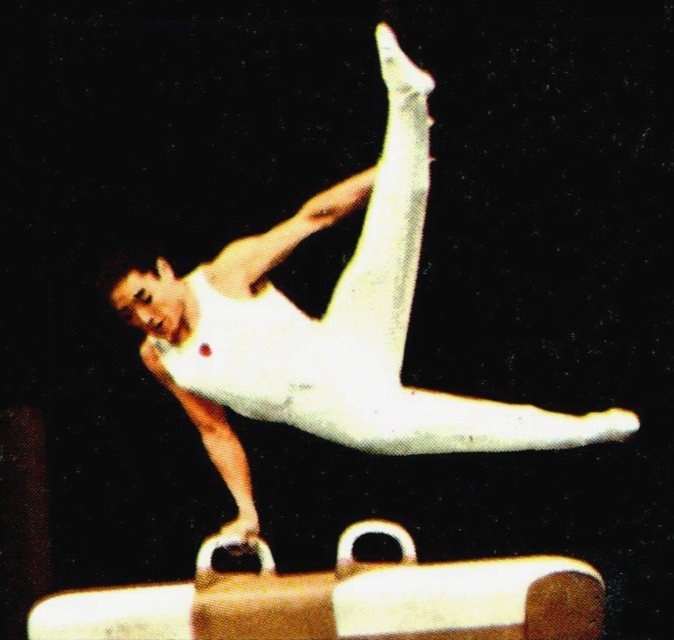

Personal information
- Born: February 13, 1948 (age 78) Okayama Prefecture, Japan
- Height: 161 cm (5 ft 3 in)

Gymnastics career
- Discipline: Men's artistic gymnastics
- Country represented: Japan
Medal record
Olympic Games
Gold medal – first place	1968 Mexico City	Team
Gold medal – first place	1972 Munich	Team
Gold medal – first place	1976 Montreal	Team
Silver medal – second place	1972 Munich	All-around
Silver medal – second place	1976 Montreal	Pommel horse
Silver medal – second place	1976 Montreal	Horizontal bar
Bronze medal – third place	1968 Mexico City	Horizontal bar
Bronze medal – third place	1972 Munich	Pommel horse
Bronze medal – third place	1972 Munich	Parallel bars
World Championships
Gold medal – first place	1970 Ljubljana	Team
Gold medal – first place	1970 Ljubljana	All-around
Gold medal – first place	1970 Ljubljana	Horizontal bar
Gold medal – first place	1974 Varna	Team
Gold medal – first place	1974 Varna	Parallel bars
Gold medal – first place	1978 Strasbourg	Team
Gold medal – first place	1978 Strasbourg	Parallel bars
Silver medal – second place	1970 Ljubljana	Floor
Silver medal – second place	1970 Ljubljana	Pommel horse
Silver medal – second place	1970 Ljubljana	Parallel bars
Silver medal – second place	1978 Strasbourg	All-around
Silver medal – second place	1979 Fort Worth	Team
Bronze medal – third place	1974 Varna	All-around
Bronze medal – third place	1974 Varna	Pommel horse
Bronze medal – third place	1974 Varna	Horizontal bar

Eizo Kenmotsu (Japanese: 監物永三, romanized: Kenmotsu Eizō; born February 13, 1948) is a former Japanese artistic gymnast, who won seven world titles and three Olympic gold medals between 1968 and 1979. In retirement, he became a leading Japanese coach. He also served as sports director of the Nippon Sport Science University and vice president of the Japan Gymnastics Association. In 2006, Kenmotsu was inducted into the International Gymnastics Hall of Fame.

Kenmotsu was 20 years and 8 months old in October 1968 when he became the youngest Japanese artistic gymnast in history to win an Olympic gold medal after the team event finals at the 1968 Summer Olympics in Mexico City. He held on to that longstanding record for almost 48 years until recently when it was finally broken by Kenzō Shirai, who in August 2016 acquired the honour when only 19 years and 11 months old, at the 2016 Summer Olympics in Rio de Janeiro–also after the team event finals. Coincidentally, they had both similarly won one other Olympic medal, each an individual event bronze–Kenmotsu on the horizontal bar and Shirai on the vault–at their respective first Olympic Games.
