= Sawao Katō =

Japanese gymnast (born 1946)

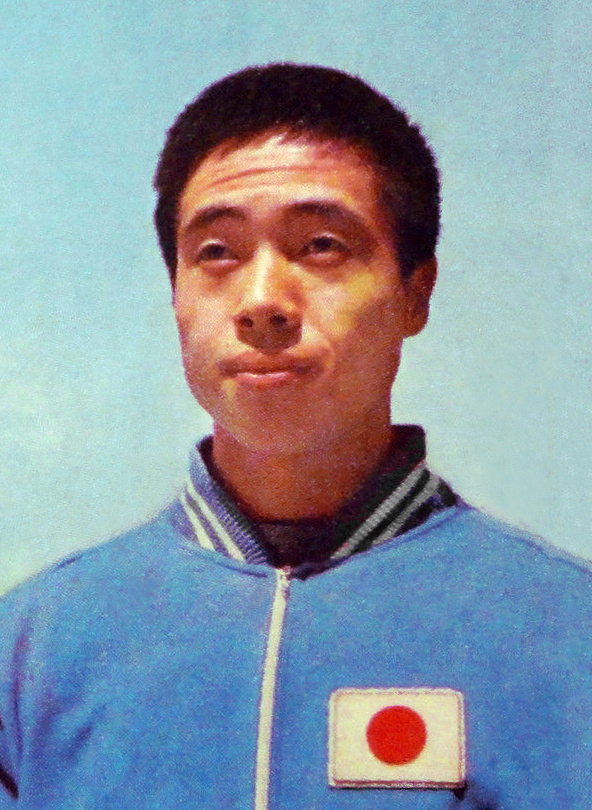
- Katō in 1970

Personal information
- Born: October 11, 1946 (age 79) Gosen, Niigata, Japan (Note: Japan was under the Allied occupation at the time of Katō's birth.)
- Height: 1.63 m (5 ft 4 in)

Gymnastics career
- Discipline: Men's artistic gymnastics
- Country represented: Japan
- Retired: 1977
Medal record
Olympic Games
Gold medal – first place	1968 Mexico City	Team
Gold medal – first place	1968 Mexico City	All-around
Gold medal – first place	1968 Mexico City	Floor
Gold medal – first place	1972 Munich	Team
Gold medal – first place	1972 Munich	All-around
Gold medal – first place	1972 Munich	Parallel bars
Gold medal – first place	1976 Montreal	Team
Gold medal – first place	1976 Montreal	Parallel bars
Silver medal – second place	1972 Munich	Pommel horse
Silver medal – second place	1972 Munich	Horizontal bar
Silver medal – second place	1976 Montreal	All-around
Bronze medal – third place	1968 Mexico City	Rings
World Championships
Gold medal – first place	1974 Varna	Team

Sawao Katō (加藤 澤男, Katō Sawao; born October 11, 1946) is a Japanese former gymnast and one of the most successful Olympic athletes of all time. Between 1968 and 1976 he won twelve Olympic medals, including eight gold medals, making him the most successful Japanese Olympian by number of gold medals won.

== Biography ==
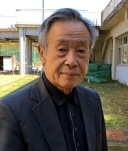
Sawao Katō, 2020

Katō was born in Niigata Prefecture on October 11, 1946, and studied at the Tokyo Kyoiku University. He first competed in the Olympics in 1968, alongside his elder brother Takeshi. They won the team competition, with Sawao also taking gold medals in the all-around and on the floor. He placed third in the rings event.

Four years later the Japanese men's gymnastics team dominated the 1972 Olympics, taking 15 out of 21 individual medals. Katō won gold medals all-around and in the parallel bars and silvers on the horizontal bar and pommel horse. He aimed for an unprecedented third gold medal in the all-around at the 1976 Summer Olympics, but was defeated by Nikolai Andrianov. The team competition was close this time, but the Japanese defeated the Soviets by four tenths of a point, earning their fifth consecutive title. Katō closed out his Olympic career by retaining his title in the parallel bars.

Katō is one of only ten athletes to have won eight or more Olympic gold medals. He is one of the most successful male gymnasts ever at the Olympics: his eight gold and twelve overall medals are best rivaled by Nikolai Andrianov's seven gold and 15 overall, Boris Shakhlin's seven gold and 13 overall, and Takashi Ono's five gold and 13 overall. He won more Olympic gold medals than any Japanese Olympian, and is second after Ono in the total number of medals. In 2001, Katō was inducted into the International Gymnastics Hall of Fame.

As of 2010, Katō was a professor emeritus at the University of Tsukuba. On May 14, 2021, Jovian asteroid 43212 Katosawao, discovered by astronomers with the American LINEAR survey in 2000, was named in his honor.

== See also ==
- List of multiple Olympic gold medalists
- List of multiple Olympic medalists
- List of multiple Summer Olympic medalists
- List of Olympic medal leaders in men's gymnastics
