= Gymnastics at the 1976 Summer Olympics – Men's horizontal bar =

Men's horizontal bar at the Games of the XXI Olympiad
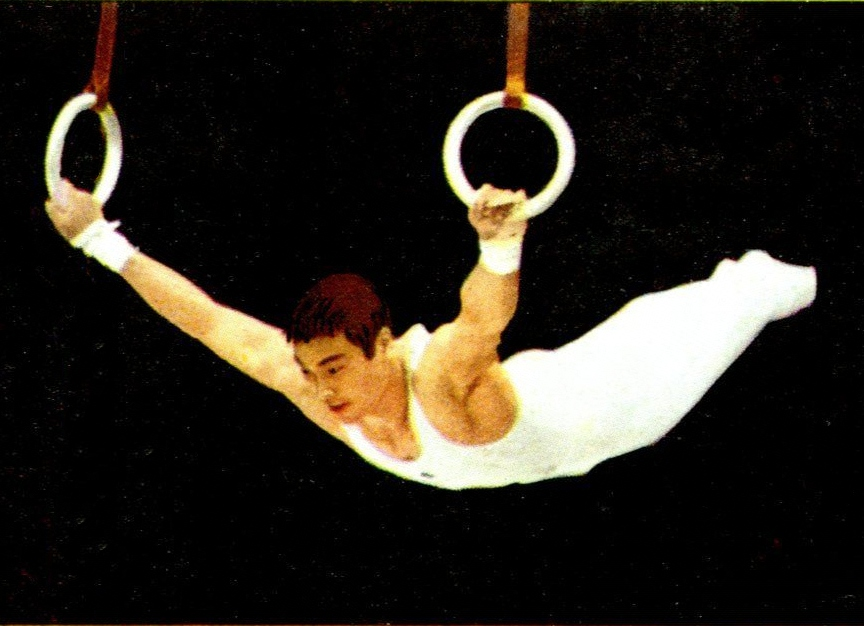
- Mitsuo Tsukahara (1972, on the rings)
- Venue: Montreal Forum
- Dates: 18–23 July 1976
- Competitors: 90 from 20 nations
- Winning score: 19.675

Medalists
1st place, gold medalist(s)		Mitsuo Tsukahara; Japan
2nd place, silver medalist(s)		Eizo Kenmotsu; Japan
3rd place, bronze medalist(s)		Eberhard Gienger; West Germany
3rd place, bronze medalist(s)		Henri Boerio; France

The men's horizontal bar competition was one of eight events for male competitors in artistic gymnastics at the 1976 Summer Olympics in Montreal. The qualification and final rounds took place on July 18, 20, and 23rd at the Montreal Forum. There were 90 competitors from 20 nations, with nations competing in the team event having 6 gymnasts while other nations could have up to 3 gymnasts. The event was won by Mitsuo Tsukahara of Japan, the second man to successfully defend an Olympic title in the horizontal bar. It was the third consecutive victory by a Japanese gymnast in the event, and fifth in six Games. Japan also took silver, as Eizo Kenmotsu finished second, but was prevented from repeating its 1972 podium sweep by new rules that limited nations to two gymnasts in the final (Japan had the top four gymnasts in qualifying). Tsukuhara and Kenmotsu (bronze in 1968) were the seventh and eighth men to win multiple medals in the horizontal bar. Henri Boerio of France and Eberhard Gienger of West Germany tied for bronze, the first medal for France in the event since 1924 and first horizontal bar medal for West Germany.

== Background ==
This was the 14th appearance of the event, which is one of the five apparatus events held every time there were apparatus events at the Summer Olympics (no apparatus events were held in 1900, 1908, 1912, or 1920). Four of the six finalists from 1972 returned: gold medalist Mitsuo Tsukahara, silver medalist Sawao Kato, and fourth-place finisher (and 1968 bronze medalist) Eizo Kenmotsu of Japan and sixth-place finisher Nikolai Andrianov of the Soviet Union. Eberhard Gienger of West Germany was the reigning (1974) world champion.

Israel made its debut in the men's horizontal bar. The United States made its 13th appearance, most of any nation, having missed only the inaugural 1896 Games.

== Competition format ==
Each nation entered a team of six gymnasts or up to three individual gymnasts. All entrants in the gymnastics competitions performed both a compulsory exercise and a voluntary exercise for each apparatus. The scores for all 12 exercises were summed to give an individual all-around score. These exercise scores were also used for qualification for the apparatus finals. The two exercises (compulsory and voluntary) for each apparatus were summed to give an apparatus score. The top 6 in each apparatus participated in the finals, except that nations were limited to two finalists each; others were ranked 7th through 90th. Half of the preliminary score carried over to the final.

== Schedule ==
All times are Eastern Daylight Time (UTC-4)

Date	Time	Round
Sunday, 18 July 1976	12:30; 19:15; 21:00	Preliminary: Compulsory
Tuesday, 20 July 1976	15:00; 19:00; 20:45	Preliminary: Voluntary
Friday, 23 July 1976	19:30	Final

== Results ==
Ninety gymnasts competed in the compulsory and optional rounds on July 18 and 20. The six highest scoring gymnasts advanced to the final on July 23. Each country was limited to two competitors in the final. Half of the points earned by each gymnast during both the compulsory and optional rounds carried over to the final. This constitutes the "prelim" score.

Rank	Gymnast	Nation	Preliminary			Final		
Rank	Gymnast	Nation	Compulsory	Voluntary	Total	1/2 Prelim.	Final	Total
1st place, gold medalist(s)	Mitsuo Tsukahara	Japan	9.75	9.90	19.65	9.775	9.900	19.675
2nd place, silver medalist(s)	Eizo Kenmotsu	Japan	9.65	9.85	19.50	9.750	9.750	19.500
3rd place, bronze medalist(s)	Eberhard Gienger	West Germany	9.65	9.70	19.35	9.675	9.800	19.475
3rd place, bronze medalist(s)	Henri Boerio	France	9.60	9.75	19.35	9.675	9.800	19.475
5	Gennady Krysin	Soviet Union	9.50	9.80	19.30	9.525	9.600	19.125
6	Ferenc Donath	Hungary	9.55	9.65	19.20	9.500	9.450	18.950
7	Hisato Igarashi	Japan	9.60	9.85	19.45	Did not advance		
8	Sawao Kato	Japan	9.65	9.75	19.40	Did not advance		
9	Vladimir Markelov	Soviet Union	9.60	9.70	19.30	Did not advance		
10	Hiroshi Kajiyama	Japan	9.50	9.75	19.25	Did not advance		
11	Nikolai Andrianov	Soviet Union	9.70	9.50	19.20	Did not advance		
11	Bernd Jäger	East Germany	9.60	9.60	19.20	Did not advance		
11	Michael Nikolay	East Germany	9.60	9.60	19.20	Did not advance		
14	Tom Beach	United States	9.45	9.65	19.10	Did not advance		
14	Alexander Dityatin	Soviet Union	9.45	9.65	19.10	Did not advance		
14	Andrzej Szajna	Poland	9.50	9.60	19.10	Did not advance		
17	Zoltán Magyar	Hungary	9.50	9.55	19.05	Did not advance		
17	Vladimir Marchenko	Soviet Union	9.45	9.60	19.05	Did not advance		
19	Dan Grecu	Romania	9.40	9.60	19.00	Did not advance		
20	Vladimir Tikhonov	Soviet Union	9.30	9.65	18.95	Did not advance		
21	Robert Bretscher	Switzerland	9.25	9.65	18.90	Did not advance		
22	Imre Molnar	Hungary	9.35	9.50	18.85	Did not advance		
22	Volker Rohrwick	West Germany	9.40	9.45	18.85	Did not advance		
22	Wayne Young	United States	9.35	9.50	18.85	Did not advance		
25	Béla Laufer	Hungary	9.25	9.55	18.80	Did not advance		
25	Lutz Mack	East Germany	9.30	9.50	18.80	Did not advance		
25	Willi Moy	France	9.40	9.40	18.80	Did not advance		
25	Kurt Thomas	United States	9.30	9.50	18.80	Did not advance		
29	Ueli Bachmann	Switzerland	9.30	9.45	18.75	Did not advance		
29	Sorin Cepoi	Romania	9.30	9.45	18.75	Did not advance		
31	Rainer Hanschke	East Germany	9.40	9.30	18.70	Did not advance		
31	Peter Kormann	United States	9.20	9.50	18.70	Did not advance		
33	Philip Delesalle	Canada	9.40	9.25	18.65	Did not advance		
33	Wolfgang Klotz	East Germany	9.20	9.45	18.65	Did not advance		
33	Bernhard Locher	Switzerland	9.15	9.50	18.65	Did not advance		
36	Bart Conner	United States	9.40	9.20	18.60	Did not advance		
36	Gustav Tannenberger	Czechoslovakia	9.25	9.35	18.60	Did not advance		
38	Imre Bánrévi	Hungary	9.25	9.30	18.55	Did not advance		
38	Roland Brückner	East Germany	9.25	9.30	18.55	Did not advance		
38	Nicolae Oprescu	Romania	9.15	9.40	18.55	Did not advance		
38	Ştefan Gal	Romania	9.10	9.45	18.55	Did not advance		
38	Werner Steinmetz	West Germany	9.20	9.35	18.55	Did not advance		
43	Marshall Avener	United States	9.10	9.40	18.50	Did not advance		
43	Edgar Jorek	West Germany	9.30	9.20	18.50	Did not advance		
45	Vladislav Nehasil	Czechoslovakia	9.35	9.05	18.40	Did not advance		
46	Philippe Gaille	Switzerland	9.05	9.30	18.35	Did not advance		
46	Andrey Keranov	Bulgaria	9.15	9.20	18.35	Did not advance		
48	Bernard Decoux	France	9.05	9.25	18.30	Did not advance		
48	Miloslav Netusil	Czechoslovakia	9.15	9.15	18.30	Did not advance		
48	Marian Pieczka	Poland	9.05	9.25	18.30	Did not advance		
48	Reinhard Dietze	West Germany	8.95	9.35	18.30	Did not advance		
48	Eric Koloko	France	9.35	8.95	18.30	Did not advance		
53	Mariusz Zasada	Poland	9.30	8.90	18.20	Did not advance		
53	Jiri Tabak	Czechoslovakia	9.00	9.20	18.20	Did not advance		
55	Keith Carter	Canada	9.00	9.10	18.10	Did not advance		
55	Georgi Todorov	Bulgaria	9.00	9.10	18.10	Did not advance		
57	Maurizio Montesi	Italy	8.80	9.25	18.05	Did not advance		
58	Ole Benediktson	Denmark	8.65	9.30	17.95	Did not advance		
58	Maurizio Milanetto	Italy	8.65	9.30	17.95	Did not advance		
58	Peter Rohner	Switzerland	9.05	8.90	17.95	Did not advance		
61	Patrick Boutet	France	8.50	9.35	17.85	Did not advance		
61	Árpád Farkas	Hungary	9.10	8.75	17.85	Did not advance		
61	Pierre Leclerc	Canada	9.00	8.85	17.85	Did not advance		
64	Mihai Borş	Romania	8.65	9.15	17.80	Did not advance		
64	Ion Checicheş	Romania	8.90	8.90	17.80	Did not advance		
66	Angelo Zucca	Italy	8.40	9.30	17.70	Did not advance		
66	Dimitar Koychev	Bulgaria	8.75	8.95	17.70	Did not advance		
66	Roman Tkaczyk	Poland	8.70	9.00	17.70	Did not advance		
69	Dov Lupi	Israel	8.75	8.90	17.65	Did not advance		
70	Jan Zoulík	Czechoslovakia	8.70	8.80	17.50	Did not advance		
71	Stoyan Delchev	Bulgaria	8.45	8.95	17.40	Did not advance		
71	Łukasz Uhma	Poland	8.55	8.85	17.40	Did not advance		
73	Michel Boutard	France	9.20	8.15	17.35	Did not advance		
73	Gabriel Calvo	Spain	8.40	8.95	17.35	Did not advance		
75	Ian Neale	Great Britain	8.10	9.20	17.30	Did not advance		
76	Reinhard Ritter	West Germany	8.05	9.20	17.25	Did not advance		
76	Zhivko Rusev	Bulgaria	8.50	8.75	17.25	Did not advance		
78	José de la Casa	Spain	8.60	8.60	17.20	Did not advance		
79	Tommy Wilson	Great Britain	8.15	9.00	17.15	Did not advance		
80	Peter Lloyd	Australia	8.40	8.70	17.10	Did not advance		
81	Grzegorz Ciastek	Poland	8.90	8.15	17.05	Did not advance		
81	Dimitrios Janulidis	Czechoslovakia	8.50	8.55	17.05	Did not advance		
83	Phil Cheetham	Australia	8.65	8.30	16.95	Did not advance		
83	Jeff Davis	Great Britain	8.15	8.80	16.95	Did not advance		
85	Toncho Todorov	Bulgaria	8.20	8.70	16.90	Did not advance		
86	Nelson Fernández	Cuba	7.60	9.15	16.75	Did not advance		
87	Fernando Bertrand	Spain	7.30	8.90	16.20	Did not advance		
88	Shun Fujimoto	Japan	9.60	—	9.60	Did not advance		
89	Roberto Richards	Cuba	9.20	—	9.20	Did not advance		
90	Armin Vock	Switzerland	8.90	—	8.90	Did not advance		
—	Jorge Cuervo	Cuba	DNS			Did not advance		
