= Gymnastics at the 1976 Summer Olympics – Men's parallel bars =

Olympic gymnastics event

Men's parallel bars at the Games of the XXI Olympiad
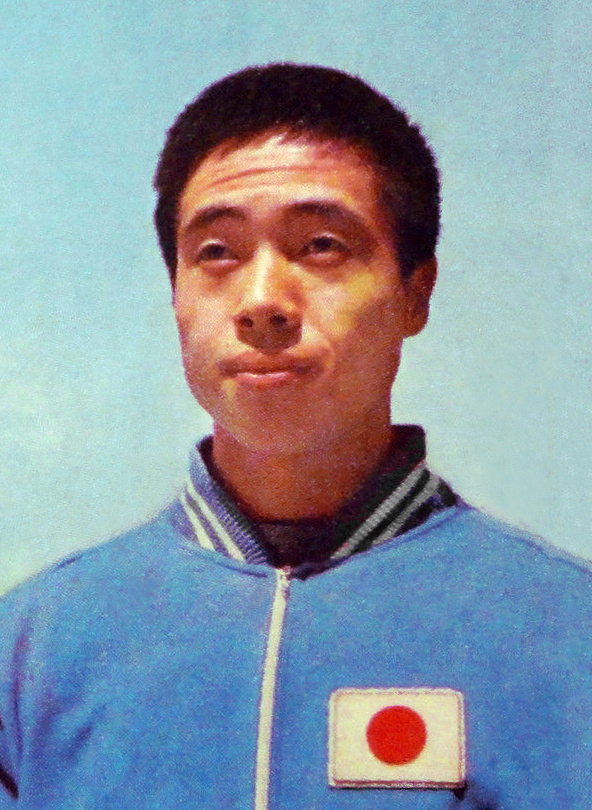
- Sawao Katō (1970)
- Venue: Montreal Forum
- Dates: 18–23 July 1976
- Competitors: 90 from 20 nations
- Winning score: 19.675

Medalists
1st place, gold medalist(s)		Sawao Katō; Japan
2nd place, silver medalist(s)		Nikolai Andrianov; Soviet Union
3rd place, bronze medalist(s)		Mitsuo Tsukahara; Japan

The men's parallel bars competition was one of eight events for male competitors in artistic gymnastics at the 1976 Summer Olympics in Montreal. The qualification and final rounds took place on July 18, 20, and 23rd at the Montreal Forum. There were 90 competitors from 20 nations, with nations competing in the team event having 6 gymnasts while other nations could have up to 3 gymnasts. The event was won by Sawao Katō of Japan, the first man to successfully defend an Olympic title in the parallel bars—and, as of the 2016 Games, still the only one to do so (the most decorated parallel bars gymnast, Li Xiaopeng, had his two gold medals separated by a bronze). It was the fourth consecutive victory by a Japanese gymnast in the event, breaking a tie with Switzerland for most all-time. Japan was unable to repeat its 1972 medal sweep, as nations were now limited to two finalists each. Nikolai Andrianov of the Soviet Union took silver, while Mitsuo Tsukahara of Japan earned bronze, missing a 1–2 finish for Japan by .025 points.

== Background ==
This was the 14th appearance of the event, which is one of the five apparatus events held every time there were apparatus events at the Summer Olympics (no apparatus events were held in 1900, 1908, 1912, or 1920). Three of the six finalists from 1972 returned: gold medalist Sawao Katō of Japan, bronze medalist Eizo Kenmotsu of Japan, and sixth-place finisher Nikolai Andrianov of the Soviet Union. Kenmotsu had won the 1974 world championship, with Andrianov the runner-up.

Israel made its debut in the men's parallel bars. The United States made its 13th appearance, most of any nation, having missed only the inaugural 1896 Games.

== Competition format ==
Each nation entered a team of six gymnasts or up to three individual gymnasts. All entrants in the gymnastics competitions performed both a compulsory exercise and a voluntary exercise for each apparatus. The scores for all 12 exercises were summed to give an individual all-around score. These exercise scores were also used for qualification for the apparatus finals. The two exercises (compulsory and voluntary) for each apparatus were summed to give an apparatus score. The top 6 in each apparatus participated in the finals, except that nations were limited to two finalists each; others were ranked 7th through 90th. Half of the preliminary score carried over to the final.

== Schedule ==
All times are Eastern Daylight Time (UTC-4)

Date	Time	Round
Sunday, 18 July 1976	12:30; 19:15; 21:00	Preliminary: Compulsory
Tuesday, 20 July 1976	15:00; 19:00; 20:45	Preliminary: Voluntary
Friday, 23 July 1976	19:30	Final

== Results ==
Ninety gymnasts competed in the compulsory and optional rounds on July 18 and 20. The six highest scoring gymnasts advanced to the final on July 23. Each country was limited to two competitors in the final. Half of the points earned by each gymnast during both the compulsory and optional rounds carried over to the final. This constitutes the "prelim" score.

Rank	Gymnast	Nation	Preliminary			Final		
Rank	Gymnast	Nation	Compulsory	Voluntary	Total	1/2 Prelim.	Final	Total
1st place, gold medalist(s)	Sawao Katō	Japan	9.75	9.80	19.55	9.775	9.900	19.675
2nd place, silver medalist(s)	Nikolai Andrianov	Soviet Union	9.80	9.70	19.50	9.750	9.750	19.500
3rd place, bronze medalist(s)	Mitsuo Tsukahara	Japan	9.70	9.65	19.35	9.675	9.800	19.475
4	Bernd Jäger	East Germany	9.65	9.55	19.20	9.600	9.600	19.200
5	Miloslav Netusil	Czechoslovakia	9.45	9.60	19.05	9.525	9.600	19.125
6	Andrzej Szajna	Poland	9.45	9.55	19.00	9.500	9.450	18.950
7	Hiroshi Kajiyama	Japan	9.70	9.65	19.35	Did not advance		
8	Dan Grecu	Romania	9.70	9.55	19.25	Did not advance		
8	Vladimir Markelov	Soviet Union	9.65	9.60	19.25	Did not advance		
10	Hisato Igarashi	Japan	9.55	9.45	19.00	Did not advance		
10	Zoltán Magyar	Hungary	9.55	9.45	19.00	Did not advance		
12	Bart Conner	United States	9.55	9.40	18.95	Did not advance		
13	Alexander Dityatin	Soviet Union	9.50	9.40	18.90	Did not advance		
13	Lutz Mack	East Germany	9.50	9.40	18.90	Did not advance		
15	Henri Boerio	France	9.45	9.40	18.85	Did not advance		
15	Gennady Krysin	Soviet Union	9.45	9.40	18.85	Did not advance		
17	Robert Bretscher	Switzerland	9.50	9.25	18.75	Did not advance		
17	Eizo Kenmotsu	Japan	9.00	9.75	18.75	Did not advance		
17	Imre Molnar	Hungary	9.60	9.15	18.75	Did not advance		
17	Michael Nikolay	East Germany	9.40	9.35	18.75	Did not advance		
21	Ferenc Donath	Hungary	9.40	9.30	18.70	Did not advance		
21	Edgar Jorek	West Germany	9.30	9.40	18.70	Did not advance		
21	Kurt Thomas	United States	9.40	9.30	18.70	Did not advance		
24	Volker Rohrwick	West Germany	9.25	9.40	18.65	Did not advance		
25	Mihai Borş	Romania	9.45	9.15	18.60	Did not advance		
25	Pierre Leclerc	Canada	9.40	9.20	18.60	Did not advance		
27	Gustav Tannenberger	Czechoslovakia	9.30	9.25	18.55	Did not advance		
27	Wayne Young	United States	9.35	9.20	18.55	Did not advance		
29	Rainer Hanschke	East Germany	9.35	9.15	18.50	Did not advance		
29	Nicolae Oprescu	Romania	9.40	9.10	18.50	Did not advance		
31	Mariusz Zasada	Poland	9.25	9.20	18.45	Did not advance		
32	Vladislav Nehasil	Czechoslovakia	8.95	9.40	18.35	Did not advance		
33	Sorin Cepoi	Romania	9.25	9.05	18.30	Did not advance		
33	Ştefan Gal	Romania	9.05	9.25	18.30	Did not advance		
35	Marshall Avener	United States	9.20	9.05	18.25	Did not advance		
35	Wolfgang Klotz	East Germany	9.05	9.20	18.25	Did not advance		
37	Eberhard Gienger	West Germany	8.80	9.40	18.20	Did not advance		
37	Maurizio Milanetto	Italy	9.15	9.05	18.20	Did not advance		
37	Roberto Richards	Cuba	8.90	9.30	18.20	Did not advance		
37	Roland Brückner	East Germany	9.10	9.10	18.20	Did not advance		
37	Dov Lupi	Israel	9.00	9.20	18.20	Did not advance		
37	Peter Rohner	Switzerland	9.25	8.95	18.20	Did not advance		
43	Tom Beach	United States	9.15	9.00	18.15	Did not advance		
43	Árpád Farkas	Hungary	9.15	9.00	18.15	Did not advance		
43	Eric Koloko	France	9.15	9.00	18.15	Did not advance		
46	Ueli Bachmann	Switzerland	8.80	9.30	18.10	Did not advance		
46	Stoyan Delchev	Bulgaria	8.90	9.20	18.10	Did not advance		
46	Peter Kormann	United States	9.05	9.05	18.10	Did not advance		
46	Vladimir Tikhonov	Soviet Union	9.30	8.80	18.10	Did not advance		
50	Vladimir Marchenko	Soviet Union	8.55	9.50	18.05	Did not advance		
50	Willi Moy	France	9.20	8.85	18.05	Did not advance		
50	Łukasz Uhma	Poland	8.70	9.35	18.05	Did not advance		
53	Béla Laufer	Hungary	9.30	8.70	18.00	Did not advance		
54	Ion Checicheş	Romania	8.85	9.10	17.95	Did not advance		
55	Gabriel Calvo	Spain	8.85	9.05	17.90	Did not advance		
56	Keith Carter	Canada	9.05	8.80	17.85	Did not advance		
56	Philippe Gaille	Switzerland	8.90	8.95	17.85	Did not advance		
56	Peter Lloyd	Australia	8.90	8.95	17.85	Did not advance		
56	Werner Steinmetz	West Germany	8.90	8.95	17.85	Did not advance		
60	Bernard Decoux	France	8.85	8.95	17.80	Did not advance		
60	Roman Tkaczyk	Poland	8.95	8.85	17.80	Did not advance		
62	Imre Bánrévi	Hungary	8.55	9.20	17.75	Did not advance		
62	Ole Benediktson	Denmark	8.60	9.15	17.75	Did not advance		
62	Reinhard Dietze	West Germany	9.05	8.70	17.75	Did not advance		
62	Andrey Keranov	Bulgaria	8.95	8.80	17.75	Did not advance		
62	Reinhard Ritter	West Germany	8.80	8.95	17.75	Did not advance		
67	Armin Vock	Switzerland	9.05	8.65	17.70	Did not advance		
67	Philip Delesalle	Canada	9.20	8.50	17.70	Did not advance		
69	Patrick Boutet	France	8.40	9.25	17.65	Did not advance		
69	Maurizio Montesi	Italy	8.95	8.70	17.65	Did not advance		
71	Michel Boutard	France	8.80	8.80	17.60	Did not advance		
71	Jan Zoulík	Czechoslovakia	8.65	8.95	17.60	Did not advance		
73	Dimitar Koychev	Bulgaria	8.65	8.90	17.55	Did not advance		
73	Dimitrios Janulidis	Czechoslovakia	8.85	8.70	17.55	Did not advance		
75	Phil Cheetham	Australia	8.65	8.80	17.45	Did not advance		
75	José de la Casa	Spain	8.90	8.55	17.45	Did not advance		
75	Bernhard Locher	Switzerland	8.65	8.80	17.45	Did not advance		
75	Angelo Zucca	Italy	8.35	9.10	17.45	Did not advance		
79	Grzegorz Ciastek	Poland	8.70	8.55	17.25	Did not advance		
79	Nelson Fernández	Cuba	8.50	8.75	17.25	Did not advance		
81	Georgi Todorov	Bulgaria	8.30	8.90	17.20	Did not advance		
81	Tommy Wilson	Great Britain	8.50	8.70	17.20	Did not advance		
83	Ian Neale	Great Britain	7.85	9.15	17.00	Did not advance		
84	Jeff Davis	Great Britain	8.00	8.90	16.90	Did not advance		
85	Marian Pieczka	Poland	8.55	8.20	16.75	Did not advance		
86	Jiri Tabak	Czechoslovakia	6.95	9.35	16.30	Did not advance		
87	Fernando Bertrand	Spain	8.60	7.60	16.20	Did not advance		
88	Toncho Todorov	Bulgaria	6.95	8.65	15.60	Did not advance		
89	Zhivko Rusev	Bulgaria	7.10	8.30	15.40	Did not advance		
90	Shun Fujimoto	Japan	9.45	0.00	9.45	Did not advance		
—	Jorge Cuervo	Cuba	DNS			Did not advance		
