= Gymnastics at the 1976 Summer Olympics – Men's pommel horse =

Olympic gymnastics event

Men's pommel horse at the Games of the XXI Olympiad
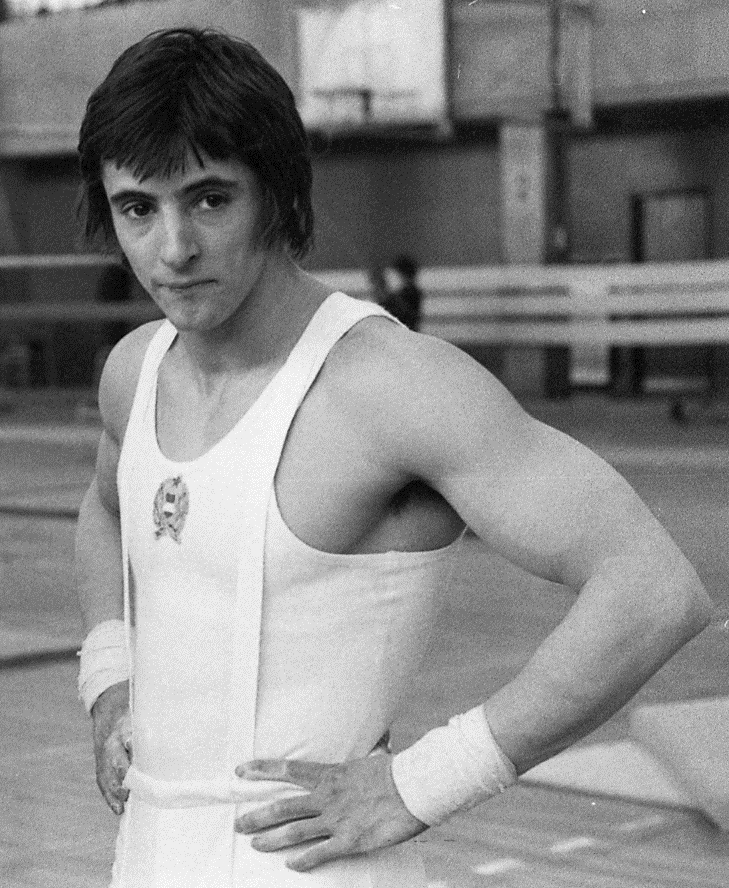
- Zoltán Magyar
- Venue: Montreal Forum
- Dates: 18–23 July 1976
- Competitors: 90 from 20 nations
- Winning score: 19.700

Medalists
1st place, gold medalist(s)		Zoltán Magyar; Hungary
2nd place, silver medalist(s)		Eizo Kenmotsu; Japan
3rd place, bronze medalist(s)		Nikolai Andrianov; Soviet Union
3rd place, bronze medalist(s)		Michael Nikolay; East Germany

The men's pommel horse competition was one of eight events for male competitors in artistic gymnastics at the 1976 Summer Olympics in Montreal. The qualification and final rounds took place on July 18, 20, and 23rd at the Montreal Forum. There were 90 competitors from 20 nations, with nations competing in the team event having 6 gymnasts while other nations could have up to 3 gymnasts. The event was won by Zoltán Magyar of Hungary, the nation's first victory in the pommel horse since 1932 (and second overall). Eizo Kenmotsu of Japan was the fifth man to win multiple medals in the event, adding a silver to his 1972 bronze. Nikolai Andrianov of the Soviet Union and Michael Nikolay of East Germany tied for third, each receiving bronze medals; this was East Germany's first medal in the event while the Soviet Union stretched its podium streak to seven Games.

== Background ==
This was the 14th appearance of the event, which is one of the five apparatus events held every time there were apparatus events at the Summer Olympics (no apparatus events were held in 1900, 1908, 1912, or 1920). Two of the six finalists from 1972 returned: silver medalist Sawao Kato and bronze medalist Eizo Kenmotsu of Japan. Zoltán Magyar of Hungary was the reigning world champion and the favorite in the event, with Nikolai Andrianov of the Soviet Union runner-up and Kenmotsu third in 1974.

Israel made its debut in the men's pommel horse. The United States made its 13th appearance, most of any nation, having missed only the inaugural 1896 Games.

== Competition format ==
Each nation entered a team of six gymnasts or up to three individual gymnasts. All entrants in the gymnastics competitions performed both a compulsory exercise and a voluntary exercise for each apparatus. The scores for all 12 exercises were summed to give an individual all-around score. These exercise scores were also used for qualification for the apparatus finals. The two exercises (compulsory and voluntary) for each apparatus were summed to give an apparatus score. The top 6 in each apparatus participated in the finals, except that nations were limited to two finalists each; others were ranked 7th through 90th. Half of the preliminary score carried over to the final.

== Schedule ==
All times are Eastern Daylight Time (UTC-4)

Date	Time	Round
Sunday, 18 July 1976	12:30; 19:15; 21:00	Preliminary: Compulsory
Tuesday, 20 July 1976	15:00; 19:00; 20:45	Preliminary: Voluntary
Friday, 23 July 1976	19:30	Final

== Results ==
Ninety gymnasts competed in the compulsory and optional rounds on July 18 and 20. The six highest scoring gymnasts advanced to the final on July 23. Each country was limited to two competitors in the final. Half of the points earned by each gymnast during both the compulsory and optional rounds carried over to the final. This constitutes the "prelim" score.

Rank	Gymnast	Nation	Preliminary			Final		
Rank	Gymnast	Nation	Compulsory	Voluntary	Total	1/2 Prelim.	Final	Total
1st place, gold medalist(s)	Zoltán Magyar	Hungary	9.75	9.85	19.60	9.800	9.900	19.700
2nd place, silver medalist(s)	Eizo Kenmotsu	Japan	9.70	9.85	19.55	9.775	9.800	19.575
3rd place, bronze medalist(s)	Nikolai Andrianov	Soviet Union	9.70	9.75	19.45	9.725	9.800	19.525
3rd place, bronze medalist(s)	Michael Nikolay	East Germany	9.60	9.85	19.45	9.725	9.800	19.525
5	Sawao Kato	Japan	9.60	9.80	19.40	9.700	9.700	19.400
6	Alexander Dityatin	Soviet Union	9.65	9.65	19.30	9.650	9.700	19.350
7	Hiroshi Kajiyama	Japan	9.50	9.75	19.25	Did not advance		
8	Mitsuo Tsukahara	Japan	9.50	9.70	19.20	Did not advance		
9	Eberhard Gienger	West Germany	9.50	9.60	19.10	Did not advance		
10	Vladimir Marchenko	Soviet Union	9.60	9.45	19.05	Did not advance		
11	Rainer Hanschke	East Germany	9.50	9.50	19.00	Did not advance		
11	Hisato Igarashi	Japan	9.40	9.60	19.00	Did not advance		
11	Gennady Krysin	Soviet Union	9.45	9.55	19.00	Did not advance		
11	Vladimir Markelov	Soviet Union	9.60	9.40	19.00	Did not advance		
11	Imre Molnar	Hungary	9.45	9.55	19.00	Did not advance		
16	Kurt Thomas	United States	9.25	9.70	18.95	Did not advance		
17	Philippe Gaille	Switzerland	9.35	9.55	18.90	Did not advance		
17	Vladimir Tikhonov	Soviet Union	9.40	9.50	18.90	Did not advance		
19	Henri Boerio	France	9.30	9.55	18.85	Did not advance		
19	Roberto Richards	Cuba	9.35	9.50	18.85	Did not advance		
21	Danuţ Grecu	Romania	9.30	9.50	18.80	Did not advance		
21	Wolfgang Klotz	East Germany	9.45	9.35	18.80	Did not advance		
23	Bernd Jäger	East Germany	9.30	9.45	18.75	Did not advance		
23	Bernhard Locher	Switzerland	9.25	9.50	18.75	Did not advance		
25	Marshall Avener	United States	9.20	9.50	18.70	Did not advance		
25	Ferenc Donath	Hungary	9.25	9.45	18.70	Did not advance		
25	Andrzej Szajna	Poland	9.20	9.50	18.70	Did not advance		
28	Gustav Tannenberger	Czechoslovakia	9.15	9.50	18.65	Did not advance		
29	Shun Fujimoto	Japan	9.10	9.50	18.60	Did not advance		
30	Roland Brückner	East Germany	9.35	9.20	18.55	Did not advance		
30	Lutz Mack	East Germany	9.30	9.25	18.55	Did not advance		
32	Béla Laufer	Hungary	9.05	9.45	18.50	Did not advance		
32	Jiri Tabak	Czechoslovakia	9.20	9.30	18.50	Did not advance		
34	Michel Boutard	France	8.90	9.55	18.45	Did not advance		
34	Miloslav Netusil	Czechoslovakia	9.10	9.35	18.45	Did not advance		
34	Volker Rohrwick	West Germany	9.15	9.30	18.45	Did not advance		
34	Wayne Young	United States	9.05	9.40	18.45	Did not advance		
38	Reinhard Dietze	West Germany	9.10	9.30	18.40	Did not advance		
38	Peter Kormann	United States	9.00	9.40	18.40	Did not advance		
40	Ueli Bachmann	Switzerland	9.05	9.30	18.35	Did not advance		
40	Marian Pieczka	Poland	9.10	9.25	18.35	Did not advance		
40	Jan Zoulík	Czechoslovakia	9.05	9.30	18.35	Did not advance		
43	Robert Bretscher	Switzerland	8.80	9.50	18.30	Did not advance		
43	Stoyan Delchev	Bulgaria	9.00	9.30	18.30	Did not advance		
43	Árpád Farkas	Hungary	9.10	9.20	18.30	Did not advance		
46	Edgar Jorek	West Germany	9.10	9.15	18.25	Did not advance		
46	Ian Neale	Great Britain	9.00	9.25	18.25	Did not advance		
46	Werner Steinmetz	West Germany	9.00	9.25	18.25	Did not advance		
49	Nicolae Oprescu	Romania	9.00	9.20	18.20	Did not advance		
49	Reinhard Ritter	West Germany	8.75	9.45	18.20	Did not advance		
51	Patrick Boutet	France	8.80	9.35	18.15	Did not advance		
51	Sorin Cepoi	Romania	8.90	9.25	18.15	Did not advance		
51	Nelson Fernández	Cuba	8.95	9.20	18.15	Did not advance		
54	Dimitrios Janulidis	Czechoslovakia	8.90	9.20	18.10	Did not advance		
54	Willi Moy	France	8.85	9.25	18.10	Did not advance		
54	Peter Rohner	Switzerland	9.00	9.10	18.10	Did not advance		
57	Tom Beach	United States	8.85	9.20	18.05	Did not advance		
58	Mihai Borş	Romania	8.75	9.25	18.00	Did not advance		
58	Ion Checicheş	Romania	8.80	9.20	18.00	Did not advance		
60	Peter Lloyd	Australia	8.80	9.15	17.95	Did not advance		
61	Keith Carter	Canada	9.00	8.85	17.85	Did not advance		
61	Eric Koloko	France	9.10	8.75	17.85	Did not advance		
61	Dov Lupi	Israel	8.95	8.90	17.85	Did not advance		
61	Maurizio Montesi	Italy	8.85	9.00	17.85	Did not advance		
61	Vladislav Nehasil	Czechoslovakia	8.75	9.10	17.85	Did not advance		
66	Ştefan Gal	Romania	9.10	8.70	17.80	Did not advance		
66	Łukasz Uhma	Poland	8.65	9.15	17.80	Did not advance		
68	Philip Delesalle	Canada	9.20	8.50	17.70	Did not advance		
68	Andrey Keranov	Bulgaria	8.65	9.05	17.70	Did not advance		
68	Maurizio Milanetto	Italy	8.70	9.00	17.70	Did not advance		
71	Ole Benediktson	Denmark	8.40	9.25	17.65	Did not advance		
71	Pierre Leclerc	Canada	8.65	9.00	17.65	Did not advance		
73	Grzegorz Ciastek	Poland	8.15	9.30	17.45	Did not advance		
74	Tommy Wilson	Great Britain	8.25	9.15	17.40	Did not advance		
75	Imre Bánrévi	Hungary	9.20	8.15	17.35	Did not advance		
75	José de la Casa	Spain	8.50	8.85	17.35	Did not advance		
77	Roman Tkaczyk	Poland	9.10	8.20	17.30	Did not advance		
78	Bart Conner	United States	8.55	8.70	17.25	Did not advance		
79	Fernando Bertrand	Spain	8.55	8.60	17.15	Did not advance		
80	Mariusz Zasada	Poland	8.05	9.05	17.10	Did not advance		
81	Toncho Todorov	Bulgaria	8.25	8.80	17.05	Did not advance		
82	Zhivko Rusev	Bulgaria	8.40	8.60	17.00	Did not advance		
82	Georgi Todorov	Bulgaria	8.40	8.60	17.00	Did not advance		
82	Angelo Zucca	Italy	9.00	8.00	17.00	Did not advance		
85	Phil Cheetham	Australia	8.15	8.45	16.60	Did not advance		
86	Gabriel Calvo	Spain	7.60	8.95	16.55	Did not advance		
86	Dimitar Koychev	Bulgaria	7.65	8.90	16.55	Did not advance		
88	Bernard Decoux	France	7.45	9.00	16.45	Did not advance		
89	Jeff Davis	Great Britain	7.40	8.75	16.15	Did not advance		
90	Armin Vock	Switzerland	9.10	0.00	9.10	Did not advance		
—	Jorge Cuervo	Cuba	DNS			Did not advance		
