= Gymnastics at the 1976 Summer Olympics – Men's rings =

Olympic gymnastics event

Men's rings at the Games of the XXI Olympiad
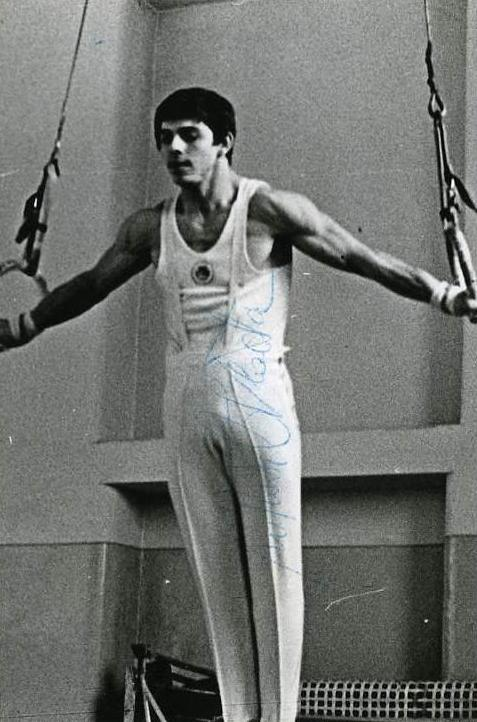
- Vladislav Nehasil competing on the rings
- Venue: Montreal Forum
- Date: 18–23 July 1976
- Competitors: 90 from 20 nations
- Winning score: 19.650

Medalists
1st place, gold medalist(s)		Nikolai Andrianov; Soviet Union
2nd place, silver medalist(s)		Alexander Dityatin; Soviet Union
3rd place, bronze medalist(s)		Dan Grecu; Romania

The men's rings competition was one of eight events for male competitors in artistic gymnastics at the 1976 Summer Olympics in Montreal. The qualification and final rounds took place on July 18, 20, and 23rd at the Montreal Forum. There were 90 competitors from 20 nations, with nations competing in the team event having 6 gymnasts while other nations could have up to 3 gymnasts. The event was won by Nikolai Andrianov of the Soviet Union, the nation's first victory in the rings since 1960 (and fourth overall). Another Soviet gymnast, Alexander Dityatin, took silver. The Soviet podium streak in the event reached seven Games. Dan Grecu earned Romania's first medal in the rings (and in any men's gymnastic event). Japan's three-Games gold medal streak and five-Games podium streak in the event ended as the nation's best results were fifth and sixth places.

== Background ==
This was the 14th appearance of the event, which is one of the five apparatus events held every time there were apparatus events at the Summer Olympics (no apparatus events were held in 1900, 1908, 1912, or 1920). Three of the four Japanese finalists from 1972 returned: bronze medalist Mitsuo Tsukahara (also a finalist in 1968), fourth-place finisher Sawao Kato (the bronze medalist in 1968), and fifth-place finisher Eizo Kenmotsu. Two-time champion Akinori Nakayama had retired. The reigning world co-champions were Dănuț Grecu of Romania and Nikolai Andrianov of the Soviet Union.

Israel made its debut in the men's rings. The United States made its 13th appearance, most of any nation, having missed only the inaugural 1896 Games.

== Competition format ==
Each nation entered a team of six gymnasts or up to three individual gymnasts. All entrants in the gymnastics competitions performed both a compulsory exercise and a voluntary exercise for each apparatus. The scores for all 12 exercises were summed to give an individual all-around score. These exercise scores were also used for qualification for the apparatus finals. The two exercises (compulsory and voluntary) for each apparatus were summed to give an apparatus score. The top 6 in each apparatus participated in the finals, except that nations were limited to two finalists each; others were ranked 7th through 90th. Half of the preliminary score carried over to the final.

== Schedule ==
All times are Eastern Daylight Time (UTC-4)

Date	Time	Round
Sunday, 18 July 1976	12:30; 19:15; 21:00	Preliminary: Compulsory
Tuesday, 20 July 1976	15:00; 19:00; 20:45	Preliminary: Voluntary
Friday, 23 July 1976	19:30	Final

== Results ==
Ninety gymnasts competed in the compulsory and optional rounds on July 18 and 20. The six highest scoring gymnasts advanced to the final on July 23. Each country was limited to two competitors in the final. Half of the points earned by each gymnast during both the compulsory and optional rounds carried over to the final. This constitutes the "prelim" score.

Rank	Gymnast	Nation	Preliminary			Final		
Rank	Gymnast	Nation	Compulsory	Voluntary	Total	1/2 Prelim.	Final	Total
1st place, gold medalist(s)	Nikolai Andrianov	Soviet Union	9.80	9.90	19.70	9.850	9.800	19.650
2nd place, silver medalist(s)	Alexander Dityatin	Soviet Union	9.60	9.90	19.50	9.750	9.800	19.550
3rd place, bronze medalist(s)	Dan Grecu	Romania	9.65	9.85	19.50	9.750	9.750	19.500
4	Ferenc Donath	Hungary	9.55	9.75	19.30	9.650	9.550	19.200
5	Eizo Kenmotsu	Japan	9.55	9.70	19.25	9.625	9.550	19.175
6	Sawao Kato	Japan	9.45	9.80	19.25	9.625	9.500	19.125
7	Vladimir Markelov	Soviet Union	9.70	9.90	19.60	Did not advance		
8	Vladimir Marchenko	Soviet Union	9.50	9.85	19.35	Did not advance		
9	Vladimir Tikhonov	Soviet Union	9.40	9.80	19.20	Did not advance		
9	Lutz Mack	East Germany	9.45	9.75	19.20	Did not advance		
9	Mitsuo Tsukahara	Japan	9.45	9.75	19.20	Did not advance		
12	Mihai Borş	Romania	9.45	9.65	19.10	Did not advance		
12	Hiroshi Kajiyama	Japan	9.40	9.70	19.10	Did not advance		
12	Nicolae Oprescu	Romania	9.40	9.70	19.10	Did not advance		
15	Shun Fujimoto	Japan	9.35	9.70	19.05	Did not advance		
16	Eberhard Gienger	West Germany	9.30	9.70	19.00	Did not advance		
17	Ion Checicheş	Romania	9.30	9.65	18.95	Did not advance		
17	Zoltán Magyar	Hungary	9.35	9.60	18.95	Did not advance		
17	Andrzej Szajna	Poland	9.35	9.60	18.95	Did not advance		
20	Henri Boerio	France	9.35	9.55	18.90	Did not advance		
20	Bernd Jäger	East Germany	9.30	9.60	18.90	Did not advance		
20	Gennady Krysin	Soviet Union	9.30	9.60	18.90	Did not advance		
20	Imre Molnar	Hungary	9.35	9.55	18.90	Did not advance		
20	Volker Rohrwick	West Germany	9.20	9.70	18.90	Did not advance		
20	Wayne Young	United States	9.30	9.60	18.90	Did not advance		
26	Robert Bretscher	Switzerland	9.30	9.50	18.80	Did not advance		
26	Edgar Jorek	West Germany	9.15	9.65	18.80	Did not advance		
26	Béla Laufer	Hungary	9.30	9.50	18.80	Did not advance		
29	Rainer Hanschke	East Germany	9.30	9.45	18.75	Did not advance		
29	Hisato Igarashi	Japan	9.25	9.50	18.75	Did not advance		
29	Maurizio Montesi	Italy	9.25	9.50	18.75	Did not advance		
32	Werner Steinmetz	West Germany	9.15	9.55	18.70	Did not advance		
32	Michael Nikolay	East Germany	9.20	9.50	18.70	Did not advance		
34	Wolfgang Klotz	East Germany	9.30	9.35	18.65	Did not advance		
34	Willi Moy	France	9.00	9.65	18.65	Did not advance		
36	Imre Bánrévi	Hungary	9.20	9.40	18.60	Did not advance		
36	Tom Beach	United States	9.20	9.40	18.60	Did not advance		
36	Roland Brückner	East Germany	9.10	9.50	18.60	Did not advance		
36	Dimitrios Janulidis	Czechoslovakia	9.20	9.40	18.60	Did not advance		
36	Maurizio Milanetto	Italy	9.10	9.50	18.60	Did not advance		
36	Jiri Tabak	Czechoslovakia	9.00	9.60	18.60	Did not advance		
42	Miloslav Netusil	Czechoslovakia	9.20	9.35	18.55	Did not advance		
43	Árpád Farkas	Hungary	9.15	9.35	18.50	Did not advance		
43	Peter Rohner	Switzerland	9.10	9.40	18.50	Did not advance		
43	Angelo Zucca	Italy	9.10	9.40	18.50	Did not advance		
46	Ştefan Gal	Romania	9.00	9.45	18.45	Did not advance		
46	Pierre Leclerc	Canada	9.10	9.35	18.45	Did not advance		
46	Armin Vock	Switzerland	9.00	9.45	18.45	Did not advance		
49	Keith Carter	Canada	9.05	9.35	18.40	Did not advance		
49	Zhivko Rusev	Bulgaria	8.95	9.45	18.40	Did not advance		
51	Kurt Thomas	United States	9.05	9.25	18.30	Did not advance		
51	Sorin Cepoi	Romania	9.10	9.20	18.30	Did not advance		
51	Bernard Decoux	France	8.95	9.35	18.30	Did not advance		
54	Peter Kormann	United States	9.05	9.15	18.20	Did not advance		
54	Reinhard Ritter	West Germany	9.05	9.15	18.20	Did not advance		
56	Marshall Avener	United States	9.20	8.95	18.15	Did not advance		
56	Bart Conner	United States	8.95	9.20	18.15	Did not advance		
56	Philippe Gaille	Switzerland	8.85	9.30	18.15	Did not advance		
59	Roberto Richards	Cuba	8.80	9.30	18.10	Did not advance		
60	Philip Delesalle	Canada	8.85	9.20	18.05	Did not advance		
60	Gustav Tannenberger	Czechoslovakia	8.85	9.20	18.05	Did not advance		
62	Dimitar Koychev	Bulgaria	8.85	9.15	18.00	Did not advance		
62	Vladislav Nehasil	Czechoslovakia	8.95	9.05	18.00	Did not advance		
64	Reinhard Dietze	West Germany	8.65	9.25	17.90	Did not advance		
65	Grzegorz Ciastek	Poland	8.85	8.95	17.80	Did not advance		
65	Łukasz Uhma	Poland	8.70	9.10	17.80	Did not advance		
67	Jan Zoulík	Czechoslovakia	8.75	9.00	17.75	Did not advance		
68	Andrey Keranov	Bulgaria	8.45	9.20	17.65	Did not advance		
68	Roman Tkaczyk	Poland	8.65	9.00	17.65	Did not advance		
70	Bernhard Locher	Switzerland	8.60	9.00	17.60	Did not advance		
70	Dov Lupi	Israel	8.55	9.05	17.60	Did not advance		
70	Marian Pieczka	Poland	8.40	9.20	17.60	Did not advance		
73	Ueli Bachmann	Switzerland	8.40	9.15	17.55	Did not advance		
74	Georgi Todorov	Bulgaria	9.05	8.45	17.50	Did not advance		
74	Tommy Wilson	Great Britain	8.55	8.95	17.50	Did not advance		
76	Eric Koloko	France	8.45	9.00	17.45	Did not advance		
77	Fernando Bertrand	Spain	8.40	8.95	17.35	Did not advance		
77	Mariusz Zasada	Poland	8.65	8.70	17.35	Did not advance		
79	Stoyan Delchev	Bulgaria	7.70	9.55	17.25	Did not advance		
80	José de la Casa	Spain	8.30	8.90	17.20	Did not advance		
80	Michel Boutard	France	8.20	9.00	17.20	Did not advance		
80	Gabriel Calvo	Spain	8.20	9.00	17.20	Did not advance		
83	Phil Cheetham	Australia	8.45	8.65	17.10	Did not advance		
83	Toncho Todorov	Bulgaria	8.05	9.05	17.10	Did not advance		
85	Nelson Fernández	Cuba	8.55	8.25	16.80	Did not advance		
85	Peter Lloyd	Australia	8.35	8.45	16.80	Did not advance		
87	Ole Benediktson	Denmark	7.90	8.85	16.75	Did not advance		
88	Jeff Davis	Great Britain	8.00	8.65	16.65	Did not advance		
89	Ian Neale	Great Britain	8.05	8.40	16.45	Did not advance		
90	Patrick Boutet	France	7.65	8.50	16.15	Did not advance		
—	Jorge Cuervo	Cuba	DNS			Did not advance		
