= Gymnastics at the 1976 Summer Olympics – Men's vault =

Olympic gymnastics event

Men's vault at the Games of the XXI Olympiad
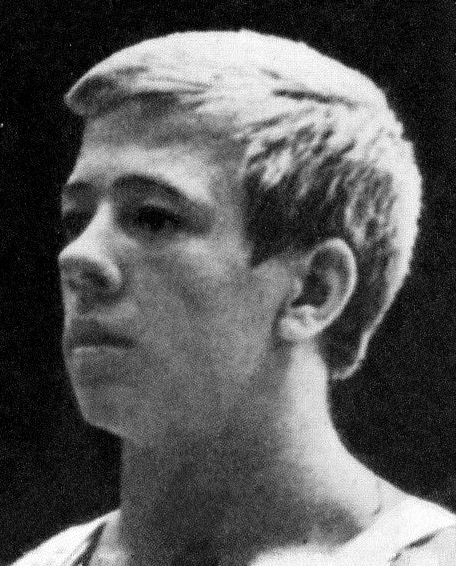
- Nikolai Andrianov (c. 1974)
- Venue: Montreal Forum
- Date: 18–23 July 1976
- Competitors: 90 from 20 nations
- Winning score: 19.450

Medalists
1st place, gold medalist(s)		Nikolai Andrianov; Soviet Union
2nd place, silver medalist(s)		Mitsuo Tsukahara; Japan
3rd place, bronze medalist(s)		Hiroshi Kajiyama; Japan

The men's vault competition was one of eight events for male competitors in artistic gymnastics at the 1976 Summer Olympics in Montreal. The qualification and final rounds took place on July 18, 20, and 23rd at the Montreal Forum. There were 90 competitors from 20 nations, with nations competing in the team event having 6 gymnasts while other nations could have up to 3 gymnasts. The event was won by Nikolai Andrianov of the Soviet Union, the nation's fifth gold medal in the men's vault; it was the seventh consecutive Games that the Soviets had a gymnast place in the top two. Andrianov became the third man to win multiple vault medals, adding to his 1972 bronze. Japan returned to the vault podium after a one-Games absence, with Mitsuo Tsukahara taking silver and Hiroshi Kajiyama bronze.

== Background ==
This was the 14th appearance of the event, which is one of the five apparatus events held every time there were apparatus events at the Summer Olympics (no apparatus events were held in 1900, 1908, 1912, or 1920). Three of the six finalists from 1972 returned: bronze medalist Nikolai Andrianov of the Soviet Union, fourth-place finisher Sawao Kato of Japan, and sixth-place finisher Peter Rohner of Switzerland. The 1974 vault world champion, Shigeru Kasamatsu of Japan, did not compete in Montreal. Andrianov had been the runner-up.

Israel made its debut in the men's vault. The United States made its 13th appearance, most of any nation, having missed only the inaugural 1896 Games.

== Competition format ==
The event used a "vaulting horse" aligned parallel to the gymnast's run (rather than the modern "vaulting table" in use since 2004). Each nation entered a team of six gymnasts or up to three individual gymnasts. All entrants in the gymnastics competitions performed both a compulsory exercise and a voluntary exercise for each apparatus. The scores for all 12 exercises were summed to give an individual all-around score. These exercise scores were also used for qualification for the apparatus finals. The two exercises (compulsory and voluntary) for each apparatus were summed to give an apparatus score. The top 6 in each apparatus participated in the finals, except that nations were limited to two finalists each; others were ranked 7th through 90th. Half of the preliminary score carried over to the final.

== Schedule ==
All times are Eastern Daylight Time (UTC-4)

Date	Time	Round
Sunday, 18 July 1976	12:30; 19:15; 21:00	Preliminary: Compulsory
Tuesday, 20 July 1976	15:00; 19:00; 20:45	Preliminary: Voluntary
Friday, 23 July 1976	19:30	Final

== Results ==
Ninety gymnasts competed in the compulsory and optional rounds on July 18 and 20. The six highest scoring gymnasts advanced to the final on July 23. Each country was limited to two competitors in the final. Half of the points earned by each gymnast during both the compulsory and optional rounds carried over to the final. This constitutes the "prelim" score.

Rank	Gymnast	Nation	Preliminary			Final		
Rank	Gymnast	Nation	Compulsory	Voluntary	Total	1/2 Prelim.	Final	Total
1st place, gold medalist(s)	Nikolai Andrianov	Soviet Union	9.65	9.70	19.35	9.675	9.775	19.450
2nd place, silver medalist(s)	Mitsuo Tsukahara	Japan	9.50	9.80	19.30	9.650	9.725	19.375
3rd place, bronze medalist(s)	Hiroshi Kajiyama	Japan	9.65	9.70	19.35	9.675	9.600	19.275
4	Danuţ Grecu	Romania	9.60	9.70	19.30	9.650	9.550	19.200
5	Zoltán Magyar	Hungary	9.60	9.55	19.15	9.575	9.575	19.150
5	Imre Molnar	Hungary	9.75	9.70	19.45	9.725	9.425	19.150
7	Ferenc Donath	Hungary	9.55	9.55	19.10	Did not advance		
7	Sawao Kato	Japan	9.55	9.55	19.10	Did not advance		
7	Andrzej Szajna	Poland	9.40	9.70	19.10	Did not advance		
7	Jiri Tabak	Czechoslovakia	9.35	9.75	19.10	Did not advance		
11	Mihai Borş	Romania	9.40	9.65	19.05	Did not advance		
11	Roland Brückner	East Germany	9.50	9.55	19.05	Did not advance		
11	Alexander Dityatin	Soviet Union	9.40	9.65	19.05	Did not advance		
11	Béla Laufer	Hungary	9.50	9.55	19.05	Did not advance		
15	Eizo Kemmotsu	Japan	9.65	9.35	19.00	Did not advance		
15	Gennady Krysin	Soviet Union	9.50	9.50	19.00	Did not advance		
15	Vladimir Marchenko	Soviet Union	9.45	9.55	19.00	Did not advance		
18	Imre Bánrévi	Hungary	9.45	9.50	18.95	Did not advance		
19	Gabriel Calvo	Spain	9.30	9.60	18.90	Did not advance		
19	Eberhard Gienger	West Germany	9.50	9.40	18.90	Did not advance		
19	Hisato Igarashi	Japan	9.45	9.45	18.90	Did not advance		
22	Henri Boerio	France	9.35	9.50	18.85	Did not advance		
22	Robert Bretscher	Switzerland	9.30	9.55	18.85	Did not advance		
22	Wolfgang Klotz	East Germany	9.35	9.50	18.85	Did not advance		
22	Georgi Todorov	Bulgaria	9.30	9.55	18.85	Did not advance		
26	Ion Checicheş	Romania	9.40	9.40	18.80	Did not advance		
26	Bernd Jäger	East Germany	9.40	9.40	18.80	Did not advance		
26	Willi Moy	France	9.25	9.55	18.80	Did not advance		
26	Vladimir Markelov	Soviet Union	9.60	9.20	18.80	Did not advance		
30	Keith Carter	Canada	9.25	9.50	18.75	Did not advance		
30	Dimitrios Janulidis	Czechoslovakia	9.15	9.60	18.75	Did not advance		
30	Lutz Mack	East Germany	9.35	9.40	18.75	Did not advance		
30	Maurizio Milanetto	Italy	9.30	9.45	18.75	Did not advance		
30	Volker Rohrwick	West Germany	9.35	9.40	18.75	Did not advance		
35	Árpád Farkas	Hungary	9.30	9.40	18.70	Did not advance		
35	Marian Pieczka	Poland	9.20	9.50	18.70	Did not advance		
37	Philip Delesalle	Canada	9.30	9.35	18.65	Did not advance		
37	Vladislav Nehasil	Czechoslovakia	9.20	9.45	18.65	Did not advance		
39	Wayne Young	United States	9.20	9.40	18.60	Did not advance		
40	Sorin Cepoi	Romania	9.30	9.25	18.55	Did not advance		
40	Nelson Fernández	Cuba	9.15	9.40	18.55	Did not advance		
40	Pierre Leclerc	Canada	9.35	9.20	18.55	Did not advance		
40	Łukasz Uhma	Poland	9.10	9.45	18.55	Did not advance		
44	Tom Beach	United States	9.20	9.30	18.50	Did not advance		
44	Bart Conner	United States	9.20	9.30	18.50	Did not advance		
44	Ştefan Gal	Romania	9.20	9.30	18.50	Did not advance		
44	Ian Neale	Great Britain	9.15	9.35	18.50	Did not advance		
44	Reinhard Ritter	West Germany	9.15	9.35	18.50	Did not advance		
44	Werner Steinmetz	West Germany	9.15	9.35	18.50	Did not advance		
50	Ueli Bachmann	Switzerland	9.15	9.30	18.45	Did not advance		
50	José de la Casa	Spain	8.95	9.50	18.45	Did not advance		
50	Reinhard Dietze	West Germany	9.25	9.20	18.45	Did not advance		
50	Eric Koloko	France	9.25	9.20	18.45	Did not advance		
54	Jeff Davis	Great Britain	9.15	9.25	18.40	Did not advance		
54	Gustav Tannenberger	Czechoslovakia	8.95	9.45	18.40	Did not advance		
54	Mariusz Zasada	Poland	9.15	9.25	18.40	Did not advance		
54	Angelo Zucca	Italy	8.95	9.45	18.40	Did not advance		
58	Philippe Gaille	Switzerland	9.20	9.15	18.35	Did not advance		
58	Peter Kormann	United States	9.10	9.25	18.35	Did not advance		
60	Ole Benediktson	Denmark	9.00	9.30	18.30	Did not advance		
60	Armin Vock	Switzerland	9.10	9.20	18.30	Did not advance		
62	Marshall Avener	United States	9.05	9.20	18.25	Did not advance		
62	Edgar Jorek	West Germany	9.40	8.85	18.25	Did not advance		
62	Michael Nikolay	East Germany	9.25	9.00	18.25	Did not advance		
62	Roberto Richards	Cuba	9.30	8.95	18.25	Did not advance		
66	Patrick Boutet	France	8.90	9.25	18.15	Did not advance		
66	Grzegorz Ciastek	Poland	8.95	9.20	18.15	Did not advance		
66	Bernard Decoux	France	8.75	9.40	18.15	Did not advance		
66	Stoyan Delchev	Bulgaria	8.75	9.40	18.15	Did not advance		
66	Maurizio Montesi	Italy	8.75	9.40	18.15	Did not advance		
66	Roman Tkaczyk	Poland	8.75	9.40	18.15	Did not advance		
66	Jan Zoulík	Czechoslovakia	8.90	9.25	18.15	Did not advance		
73	Fernando Bertrand	Spain	8.70	9.40	18.10	Did not advance		
73	Andrey Keranov	Bulgaria	9.15	8.95	18.10	Did not advance		
75	Vladimir Tikhonov	Soviet Union	9.40	8.65	18.05	Did not advance		
75	Bernhard Locher	Switzerland	8.85	9.20	18.05	Did not advance		
77	Toncho Todorov	Bulgaria	8.65	9.35	18.00	Did not advance		
78	Rainer Hanschke	East Germany	9.05	8.90	17.95	Did not advance		
79	Dimitar Koychev	Bulgaria	8.85	9.05	17.90	Did not advance		
80	Zhivko Rusev	Bulgaria	8.65	9.20	17.85	Did not advance		
81	Dov Lupi	Israel	9.05	8.75	17.80	Did not advance		
82	Phil Cheetham	Australia	8.50	9.25	17.75	Did not advance		
82	Miloslav Netusil	Czechoslovakia	8.50	9.25	17.75	Did not advance		
82	Nicolae Oprescu	Romania	8.35	9.40	17.75	Did not advance		
85	Tommy Wilson	Great Britain	9.05	8.65	17.70	Did not advance		
86	Michel Boutard	France	8.90	8.75	17.65	Did not advance		
86	Kurt Thomas	United States	9.20	8.45	17.65	Did not advance		
88	Peter Rohner	Switzerland	8.60	9.00	17.60	Did not advance		
89	Peter Lloyd	Australia	8.70	8.80	17.50	Did not advance		
90	Shun Fujimoto	Japan	9.00	0.00	9.00	Did not advance		
—	Jorge Cuervo	Cuba	DNS			Did not advance		
