= Gymnastics at the 1976 Summer Olympics – Men's artistic individual all-around =

Olympic gymnastics event

Men's artistic individual all-around at the Games of the XXI Olympiad
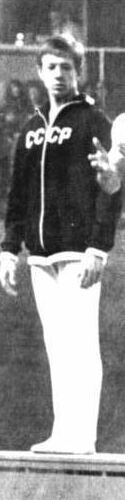
- Gold medalist Nikolai Andrianov
- Venue: Montreal Forum
- Dates: 18–21 July 1976
- Competitors: 90 from 20 nations
- Winning score: 116.650

Medalists
1st place, gold medalist(s)		Nikolai Andrianov; Soviet Union
2nd place, silver medalist(s)		Sawao Kato; Japan
3rd place, bronze medalist(s)		Mitsuo Tsukahara; Japan

The men's individual all-around competition was one of eight events for male competitors in artistic gymnastics at the 1976 Summer Olympics in Montreal. The qualification and final rounds took place on July 18, 20 and 21st at the Montreal Forum. There were 90 competitors from 20 nations. Each nation could send a team of 6 gymnasts or up to 3 individual gymnasts. The event was won by Nikolai Andrianov of the Soviet Union, the nation's fourth victory in the event (matching Italy for most among nations at that point). It was the Soviets' return to the podium in the event after a one-Games absence in 1972 snapped a five-Games medal streak. Japan, which had swept the medals in 1972, took silver and bronze this time. Two-time defending champion Sawao Kato finished second, becoming the first man to earn three medals in the men's all-around and the most decorated man in the event's history (later tied by Kōhei Uchimura with two golds and a silver from 2008 to 2016). Mitsuo Tsukahara earned bronze.

== Background ==
This was the 17th appearance of the men's individual all-around. The first individual all-around competition had been held in 1900, after the 1896 competitions featured only individual apparatus events. A men's individual all-around has been held every Games since 1900.

Four of the top 10 gymnasts from the 1972 Games returned: two-time gold medalist Sawao Kato of Japan, silver medalist (and 1968 fourth-place finisher) Eizo Kenmotsu of Japan, fourth-place finisher Nikolai Andrianov of the Soviet Union, and eighth-place finisher Mitsuo Tsukahara of Japan. Reigning (1974) World Champion Shigeru Kasamatsu of Japan missed the 1976 Games with an emergency appendectomy; Andrianov had been the runner-up with Kenmotsu third.

Israel made its debut in the event. France and Italy both made their 15th appearance, tied for most among nations.

== Competition format ==
The competition format followed the preliminary and final format introduced in 1972, but placed a limit on the number of finalists per nation. All entrants in the gymnastics competitions performed both a compulsory exercise and a voluntary exercise for each apparatus. The scores for all 12 exercises were summed to give an individual all-around preliminary score. Half of the scores from the preliminary carried over to the final, with the top 36 gymnasts advancing to the individual all-around final—except that each nation was limited to 3 finalists. There, each of the finalists performed another exercise on each apparatus. The sum of these scores plus half of the preliminary score resulted in a final total.

Each exercise was scored from 0 to 10; thus, the preliminary apparatus scores ranged from 0 to 20 each and the total preliminary score from 0 to 120. With half of the preliminary score and six more exercises scored 0 to 10, the final total was also from 0 to 120.

The preliminary exercise scores were also used for qualification for the apparatus finals.

== Schedule ==
All times are Eastern Daylight Time (UTC-4)

Date	Time	Round
Sunday, 18 July 1976	12:30; 19:15; 21:00	Preliminary: Compulsory
Tuesday, 20 July 1976	15:00; 19:00; 20:45	Preliminary: Voluntary
Wednesday, 21 July 1976	20:00	Final

== Results ==
Ninety gymnasts competed in the compulsory and optional rounds on July 18 and 20. The thirty-six highest scoring gymnasts advanced to the final on July 21. Each country was limited to three competitors in the final. Half of the points earned by each gymnast during both the compulsory and optional rounds carried over to the final. This constitutes each gymnast's "prelim" score.

Rank	Gymnast	Nation	Prelim	1/2 Prelim	Floor	Pommel horse	Rings	Vault	Parallel bars	Horizontal bar	Final	Total
1st place, gold medalist(s)	Nikolai Andrianov	Soviet Union	116.50	58.250	9.800	9.700	9.750	9.800	9.650	9.700	58.400	116.650
2nd place, silver medalist(s)	Sawao Kato	Japan	115.90	57.950	9.600	9.600	9.450	9.550	9.700	9.800	57.700	115.650
3rd place, bronze medalist(s)	Mitsuo Tsukahara	Japan	115.75	57.875	9.500	9.600	9.400	9.800	9.700	9.700	57.700	115.575
4	Alexander Dityatin	Soviet Union	115.15	57.575	9.700	9.700	9.750	9.750	9.600	9.450	57.950	115.525
5	Hiroshi Kajiyama	Japan	115.25	57.625	9.600	9.650	9.650	9.650	9.650	9.600	57.800	115.425
6	Andrzej Szajna	Poland	113.85	56.925	9.600	9.600	9.600	9.800	9.550	9.550	57.700	114.625
7	Michael Nikolay	East Germany	112.90	56.450	9.300	9.850	9.450	9.600	9.350	9.600	57.150	113.600
8	Imre Molnár	Hungary	113.65	56.825	9.200	9.700	9.250	9.650	9.500	9.450	56.750	113.575
9	Zoltán Magyar	Hungary	114.25	57.125	9.450	9.900	8.950	9.200	9.250	9.550	56.300	113.425
10	Bernd Jäger	East Germany	112.95	56.475	9.150	9.550	9.500	9.550	9.450	9.650	56.850	113.325
11	Lutz Mack	East Germany	113.00	56.500	9.200	9.450	9.500	9.550	9.400	9.550	56.650	113.150
12	Wayne Young	United States	111.55	55.775	9.550	9.550	9.600	9.550	9.450	9.550	57.250	113.025
13	Ferenc Donáth	Hungary	113.60	56.800	9.150	9.800	9.500	9.350	8.950	9.200	55.950	112.750
14	Robert Bretscher	Switzerland	112.35	56.175	9.300	9.350	9.450	9.600	9.250	9.550	56.500	112.675
15	Peter Kormann	United States	110.75	55.375	9.650	9.300	9.500	9.600	9.450	9.600	57.100	112.475
16	Eberhard Gienger	West Germany	113.30	56.650	9.250	8.8250	9.400	9.150	9.200	9.700	55.550	112.200
17	Edgar Jorek	West Germany	111.25	55.625	9.450	9.450	9.400	9.150	9.450	9.250	56.150	111.775
18	Gustav Tannenberger	Czechoslovakia	110.40	55.200	9.400	9.450	9.300	9.500	9.400	9.500	56.550	111.750
19	Volker Rohrwick	West Germany	112.20	56.100	9.400	9.500	9.100	9.500	9.300	8.650	55.450	111.550
20	Jiří Tabák	Czechoslovakia	109.40	54.700	9.600	9.200	9.150	9.700	9.400	9.550	56.600	111.300
21	Kurt Thomas	United States	111.05	55.525	9.200	9.300	9.400	9.100	9.050	9.600	55.65	111.175
22	Philip Delesalle	Canada	109.00	54.500	9.300	9.650	9.350	9.500	9.300	9.150	56.250	110.750
23	Henri Boério	France	112.90	56.450	9.100	8.600	9.550	9.100	8.700	9.000	54.050	110.500
24	Keith Carter	Canada	109.30	54.650	9.150	9.300	9.300	9.350	9.250	9.300	55.650	110.300
25	Miloslav Netušil	Czechoslovakia	109.75	54.875	8.750	9.400	9.450	9.500	9.400	8.850	55.350	110.225
26	Maurizio Milanetto	Italy	108.95	54.475	9.000	9.350	9.550	9.500	8.950	9.250	55.600	110.075
27	Ueli Bachmann	Switzerland	109.60	54.800	9.000	9.350	9.00	9.450	8.900	9.500	55.200	110.000
27	Philippe Gaille	Switzerland	109.40	54.700	8.850	9.450	9.300	9.150	9.100	9.450	55.300	110.000
29	Nicolae Oprescu	Romania	110.30	55.150	9.050	8.200	9.350	9.500	9.250	9.400	54.750	109.900
30	Eric Koloko	France	108.25	54.125	9.000	9.450	9.050	9.350	9.300	9.500	55.650	109.775
31	Maurizio Montesi	Italy	108.10	54.050	9.200	9.400	9.450	9.600	8.850	9.200	55.700	109.750
32	Sorin Cepoi	Romania	109.95	54.975	9.000	9.350	9.450	9.650	7.650	9.450	54.550	109.525
33	Willi Moy	France	109.50	54.750	9.150	8.800	9.100	9.450	8.900	9.350	54.750	109.500
34	Vladimir Markelov	Soviet Union	115.40	57.700	0.000	9.450	8.900	0.000	8.900	9.650	36.900	94.600
35	Pierre Leclerc	Canada	108.70	54.350	1.000	0.000	0.000	0.000	9.050	9.350	19.40	73.750
36	Dan Grecu	Romania	114.10	57.050	3.000	0.400	0.000	0.000	0.000	0.000	3.400	60.450
37	Eizo Kenmotsu	Japan	115.15	Did not advance—3 per nation rule								
38	Gennady Krysin	Soviet Union	114.25	Did not advance—3 per nation rule								
39	Vladimir Marchenko	Soviet Union	113.85	Did not advance—3 per nation rule								
40	Hisato Igarashi	Japan	113.55	Did not advance—3 per nation rule								
41	Vladimir Tikhonov	Soviet Union	112.15	Did not advance—3 per nation rule								
42	Roland Brückner	East Germany	112.00	Did not advance—3 per nation rule								
43	Wolfgang Klotz	East Germany	111.95	Did not advance—3 per nation rule								
44	Béla Laufer	Hungary	111.60	Did not advance—3 per nation rule								
45	Rainer Hanschke	East Germany	111.50	Did not advance—3 per nation rule								
46	Tom Beach	United States	110.55	Did not advance—3 per nation rule								
47	Werner Steinmetz	West Germany	110.30	Did not advance—3 per nation rule								
48	Ion Checicheș	Romania	109.85	Did not advance—3 per nation rule								
49	Mihai Borș	Romania	109.75	Did not advance—3 per nation rule								
50	Árpád Farkas	Hungary	109.65	Did not advance—3 per nation rule								
51	Marshall Avener	United States	109.45	Did not advance—3 per nation rule								
52	Bart Conner	United States	109.35	Did not advance—3 per nation rule								
53	Imre Bánrévi	Hungary	109.15	Did not advance—3 per nation rule								
53	Ștefan Gal	Romania	109.15	Did not advance—3 per nation rule								
55	Vladislav Nehasil	Czechoslovakia	108.90	Did not advance—3 per nation rule								
56	Reinhard Dietze	West Germany	108.80	Did not advance—3 per nation rule								
57	Bernhard Locher	Switzerland	108.30	Did not advance—3 per nation rule								
58	Peter Rohner	Switzerland	108.25	Did not advance—3 per nation rule								
59	Andrey Keranov	Bulgaria	108.20	Did not advance—3 per nation rule								
60	Dimitrios Janulidis	Czechoslovakia	107.95	Did not advance								
61	Marian Pieczka	Poland	107.75	Did not advance								
61	Reinhard Ritter	West Germany	107.75	Did not advance								
63	Jan Zoulík	Czechoslovakia	107.35	Did not advance								
64	Stoyan Delchev	Bulgaria	107.15	Did not advance								
65	Łukasz Uhma	Poland	106.80	Did not advance								
66	Georgi Todorov	Bulgaria	106.50	Did not advance								
66	Angelo Zucca	Italy	106.50	Did not advance								
68	Dov Lupi	Israel	106.45	Did not advance								
69	Roman Tkaczyk	Poland	106.35	Did not advance								
70	Bernard Decoux	France	106.15	Did not advance								
71	Mariusz Zasada	Poland	106.10	Did not advance								
72	Ole Benediktson	Denmark	105.70	Did not advance								
73	Ian Neale	Great Britain	105.40	Did not advance								
74	Grzegorz Ciastek	Poland	105.35	Did not advance								
75	Michel Boutard	France	105.25	Did not advance								
76	Nelson Fernández	Cuba	105.15	Did not advance								
76	Gabriel Calvo	Spain	105.15	Did not advance								
78	Dimitar Koychev	Bulgaria	105.00	Did not advance								
79	José de la Casa	Spain	104.95	Did not advance								
80	Patrick Boutet	France	104.80	Did not advance								
81	Peter Lloyd	Australia	104.75	Did not advance								
82	Tommy Wilson	Great Britain	103.45	Did not advance								
83	Zhivko Rusev	Bulgaria	103.20	Did not advance								
84	Phil Cheetham	Australia	102.80	Did not advance								
85	Jeff Davis	Great Britain	102.50	Did not advance								
86	Fernando Bertrand	Spain	102.35	Did not advance								
87	Toncho Todorov	Bulgaria	101.70	Did not advance								
88	Roberto Richards	Cuba	100.65	Did not advance								
89	Shun Fujimoto	Japan	84.55	Did not advance								
90	Armin Vock	Switzerland	81.45	Did not advance								
