= Nikolai Andrianov =

Russian gymnast

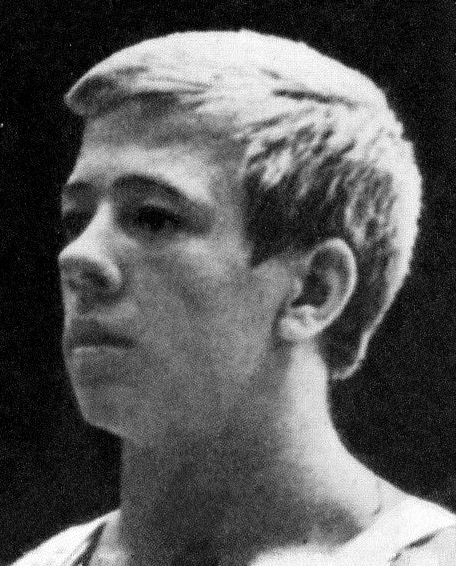
- Andrianov c. 1974

Personal information
- Full name: Nikolai Yefimovich Andrianov
- Born: 14 October 1952 Vladimir, Russian SFSR, Soviet Union
- Died: 21 March 2011 (aged 58) Vladimir, Russian Federation
- Height: 166 cm (5 ft 5 in)
- Spouse: Lyubov Burda (m. 1973; div. 2002)
- Relatives: Aleksandra Andrianova (granddaughter)

Gymnastics career
- Discipline: Men's artistic gymnastics
- Country represented: Soviet Union
- Head coach: Nikolai Tolkachev
Medal record
Olympic Games
Gold medal – first place	1972 Munich	Floor exercise
Gold medal – first place	1976 Montreal	All-around
Gold medal – first place	1976 Montreal	Floor exercise
Gold medal – first place	1976 Montreal	Rings
Gold medal – first place	1976 Montreal	Vault
Gold medal – first place	1980 Moscow	Team competition
Gold medal – first place	1980 Moscow	Vault
Silver medal – second place	1972 Munich	Team competition
Silver medal – second place	1976 Montreal	Team competition
Silver medal – second place	1976 Montreal	Parallel bars
Silver medal – second place	1980 Moscow	All-around
Silver medal – second place	1980 Moscow	Floor exercise
Bronze medal – third place	1972 Munich	Vault
Bronze medal – third place	1976 Montreal	Pommel horse
Bronze medal – third place	1980 Moscow	Horizontal bar
World Championships
Gold medal – first place	1974 Varna	Still rings
Gold medal – first place	1978 Strasbourg	Still rings
Gold medal – first place	1978 Strasbourg	All-around
Gold medal – first place	1979 Ft. Worth	Team competition
Silver medal – second place	1974 Varna	Team competition
Silver medal – second place	1974 Varna	All-around
Silver medal – second place	1974 Varna	Pommel horse
Silver medal – second place	1974 Varna	Vault
Silver medal – second place	1974 Varna	Parallel bars
Silver medal – second place	1978 Strasbourg	Team competition
Silver medal – second place	1978 Strasbourg	Vault
Silver medal – second place	1978 Strasbourg	Parallel bars
Silver medal – second place	1979 Ft. Worth	Vault
European Championships
Gold medal – first place	1971 Madrid	Pommel horse
Gold medal – first place	1971 Madrid	Vault
Gold medal – first place	1973 Grenoble	Floor exercise
Gold medal – first place	1973 Grenoble	Vault
Gold medal – first place	1975 Bern	All-around
Gold medal – first place	1975 Bern	Floor exercise
Gold medal – first place	1975 Bern	Vault
Gold medal – first place	1975 Bern	Parallel bars
Gold medal – first place	1975 Bern	Horizontal bar
Silver medal – second place	1971 Madrid	Still rings
Silver medal – second place	1971 Madrid	Parallel bars
Silver medal – second place	1973 Grenoble	All-around
Silver medal – second place	1973 Grenoble	Still rings
Silver medal – second place	1973 Grenoble	Parallel bars
Silver medal – second place	1975 Bern	Pommel horse
Bronze medal – third place	1971 Madrid	All-around
Bronze medal – third place	1971 Madrid	Floor exercise

Nikolai Yefimovich Andrianov (Russian: Никола́й Ефи́мович Андриа́нов; 14 October 1952 – 21 March 2011) was a Soviet and Russian gymnast.

He held the record for men for the most Olympic medals at 15 (7 gold medals, 5 silver medals, 3 bronze medals) until Michael Phelps surpassed him at the 2008 Beijing Summer Olympics. Andrianov is the third athlete (male or female) in cumulative Olympic medals after Phelps's 28 and Larisa Latynina's 18. Andrianov won the most medals at the 1976 Summer Olympics with 6 individual medals and one team medal. Within the sport of Men's Artistic Gymnastics, he also holds the men's record for most individual Olympic medals (12) and shares the male record for most individual Olympic gold medals in gymnastics (6) with Boris Shakhlin and Dmitry Bilozerchev (the latter of which only if you count the 1984 Alternate Olympics). In many other rankings among all-time medal winners at the Olympic, World, and European levels, he ranks very high (for example, he is second only to Vitaly Scherbo in total individual medal counts at either the gold level or any level at the combined Olympic and World levels as well as at the combined Olympic, World, and European levels), easily making him one of the most decorated gymnasts of all time. He ranks as the fourth-most decorated Olympian of all time.

== Early life and Olympic career ==
Andrianov and his four sisters were raised by a single mother who frequently worked double shifts at a chemical plant to provide for them. He recalled himself as a poorly behaved child who began to smoke early and frequently skipped school, and he credited gymnastics, and in particular his coach, Nikolai Tolkachov, with improving his character.

He entered the Children and Youth Sports School of the Burevestnik sports society in Vladimir at age 11. His first international success came in 1971 at the European Championships in Madrid, where he won two gold medals. Between 1971 and 1980 he won many international gymnastics competitions, including the Olympic Games, world championships and European championships.

Andrianov's first Olympic medal was a gold in the 1972 floor competition. He dominated the 1976 gymnastics competition, winning four golds, including the all-around, two silvers, and a bronze. These medals included golds in the floor exercises, rings, and vault, as well as a prized gold in the 1976 all-around. His record of four gymnastic golds at a single games stood until Vitaly Scherbo won six other medals in 1992.

Andrianov took the Olympic Oath for athletes at the 1980 Summer Olympics in Moscow. In the gymnastics competition, he won two more golds, two silvers, and a bronze. Andrianov's golds in that Olympics were in the vault and team competition, his silvers were in the all-around and floor exercises, and his bronze medal was in the horizontal bar. He retired shortly after that year's Olympics.

== Later life ==
Andrianov married another famous Soviet gymnast, two-time Olympic champion Lyubov Burda. Together they worked as children's gymnastics coaches, with Andrianov being the head coach of the Soviet national men's junior team in 1981–1992. In 1990–1992 he also coached the Soviet senior gymnastics team, and in 1990–1993 headed the Soviet and later the Russian Gymnastics Federation.

In 2001, Andrianov was inducted into the International Gymnastics Hall of Fame. Between 1994 and 2002 he coached the Japan Olympic gymnastics team, on the invitation of his former rival, Mitsuo Tsukahara. Andrianov coached Tsukahara's son, Naoya Tsukahara, and both father and son credit him with raising Naoya's skills and confidence to equip him to compete at the international level. In 2002 he became the director of gymnastics at the N.G. Tolkachyov Specialized Children and Youth sports school in Vladimir, where he first began the sport as a youth.

== Illness and death ==
In his final years, Andrianov developed the degenerative neurological disorder multiple system atrophy and in his final months was unable to move his arms or legs or talk. Andrianov died on 21 March 2011 at the age of 58, in his hometown of Vladimir. Russia's national gymnastic team coach, Alexander Alexandrov, called the death "tragic", but stated that he had been ill for a long time.

== Competitive history ==
Competitive history of Nikolai Andrianov
Year	Event	Team	AA	FX	PH	SR	VT	PB	HB
1971
1971	European Championships		3rd place, bronze medalist(s)	3rd place, bronze medalist(s)	1st place, gold medalist(s)	2nd place, silver medalist(s)	1st place, gold medalist(s)	2nd place, silver medalist(s)	
1971	USSR Championships						1st place, gold medalist(s)		
1972	USSR Championships		1st place, gold medalist(s)	1st place, gold medalist(s)	2nd place, silver medalist(s)	2nd place, silver medalist(s)	2nd place, silver medalist(s)	2nd place, silver medalist(s)	1st place, gold medalist(s)
1972	USSR Cup		1st place, gold medalist(s)						
1972	Olympic Games	2nd place, silver medalist(s)	4	1st place, gold medalist(s)			3rd place, bronze medalist(s)	6	6
1973
1973	European Championships		2nd place, silver medalist(s)	1st place, gold medalist(s)		2nd place, silver medalist(s)	1st place, gold medalist(s)	2nd place, silver medalist(s)	
1973	Summer Universiade	1st place, gold medalist(s)	1st place, gold medalist(s)	1st place, gold medalist(s)	1st place, gold medalist(s)		1st place, gold medalist(s)		
1973	USSR Championships		1st place, gold medalist(s)						
1974	USSR Championships		1st place, gold medalist(s)	1st place, gold medalist(s)	1st place, gold medalist(s)		3rd place, bronze medalist(s)	1st place, gold medalist(s)	
1974	USSR Cup		1st place, gold medalist(s)						
1974	World Championships	2nd place, silver medalist(s)	2nd place, silver medalist(s)		2nd place, silver medalist(s)	1st place, gold medalist(s)	2nd place, silver medalist(s)	2nd place, silver medalist(s)	
1975	World Cup		1st place, gold medalist(s)	2nd place, silver medalist(s)	2nd place, silver medalist(s)			1st place, gold medalist(s)	
1975	European Championships		1st place, gold medalist(s)	1st place, gold medalist(s)	2nd place, silver medalist(s)		1st place, gold medalist(s)	1st place, gold medalist(s)	1st place, gold medalist(s)
1975	USSR Championships			1st place, gold medalist(s)					1st place, gold medalist(s)
1976
1976	Olympic Games	2nd place, silver medalist(s)	1st place, gold medalist(s)	1st place, gold medalist(s)	3rd place, bronze medalist(s)	1st place, gold medalist(s)	1st place, gold medalist(s)	2nd place, silver medalist(s)	
1977	World Cup		1st place, gold medalist(s)	1st place, gold medalist(s)		1st place, gold medalist(s)	2nd place, silver medalist(s)	1st place, gold medalist(s)	
1978	USSR Cup		3rd place, bronze medalist(s)						
1978	World Championships	2nd place, silver medalist(s)	1st place, gold medalist(s)			1st place, gold medalist(s)	2nd place, silver medalist(s)	2nd place, silver medalist(s)	
1979	USSR Championships		3rd place, bronze medalist(s)				3rd place, bronze medalist(s)		
1979	World Championships	1st place, gold medalist(s)					2nd place, silver medalist(s)		
1980
1980	Olympic Games	1st place, gold medalist(s)	2nd place, silver medalist(s)	2nd place, silver medalist(s)			1st place, gold medalist(s)		3rd place, bronze medalist(s)

== Honours and awards ==
- Order of Lenin
- Order of the Badge of Honour
- Order of the Red Banner of Labour
- Medal "For Labour Valour"
- Lenin Komsomol Prize

== See also ==
- List of multiple Olympic medalists
- List of multiple Summer Olympic medalists
- List of multiple Olympic gold medalists
- List of multiple Olympic medalists at a single Games
- List of multiple Olympic gold medalists at a single Games
- List of Olympic medal leaders in men's gymnastics

Records
Preceded by (Soviet Union) Boris Shakhlin	Most career Olympic medals by a man 1980–2008	Succeeded by (United States) Michael Phelps
