= Patrick Boutet =

French gymnast

- Born: 14 December 1951 (age 74)
- Height: 1.68 m (5 ft 6 in)

Gymnastics career
- Discipline: Men's artistic gymnastics
- Country represented: France
Medal record
Men's artistic gymnastics
Representing France
Mediterranean Games
Gold medal – first place	1975 Algiers	Team

Patrick Boutet (born 14 December 1951) is a French gymnast. He competed in eight events at the 1976 Summer Olympics.
