= Zhivko Rusev =

Bulgarian gymnast (born 1959)

- Живко Русев
- Born: 8 June 1959 (age 67)

Gymnastics career
- Discipline: Men's artistic gymnastics
- Country represented: Bulgaria

Zhivko Rusev (Bulgarian: Живко Русев) (born 8 June 1959) is a Bulgarian gymnast. He competed in eight events at the 1976 Summer Olympics.
