= Philip Delesalle =

Canadian gymnast

- Born: 18 July 1958 (age 68) Victoria, British Columbia, Canada

Gymnastics career
- Discipline: Men's artistic gymnastics
- Country represented: Canada

Philip Delesalle (born 18 July 1958) is a Canadian gymnast. He competed in seven events at the 1976 Summer Olympics and won golds in all-around and team gymnastics at the 1978 Commonwealth Games.
