= Keith Carter (gymnast) =

Canadian gymnast

- Born: 16 October 1952 (age 73) Winnipeg, Canada

Gymnastics career
- Discipline: Men's artistic gymnastics
- Country represented: Canada

Keith Carter (born 16 October 1952) is a Canadian gymnast. He competed in seven events at the 1976 Summer Olympics.
