= Maurizio Milanetto =

Italian gymnast

- Born: 14 July 1953 (age 73) Padua, Italy
- Height: 1.73 m (5 ft 8 in)

Gymnastics career
- Discipline: Men's artistic gymnastics
- Country represented: Italy
- Gym: Società Sportiva Ginnastica Ardor

Maurizio Milanetto (born 14 July 1953) is an Italian gymnast. He competed at the 1972 Summer Olympics and the 1976 Summer Olympics.
