= Łukasz Uhma =

Polish gymnast

- Born: 20 January 1954 (age 72) Warsaw, Polish People's Republic
- Height: 1.57 m (5 ft 2 in)

Gymnastics career
- Discipline: Men's artistic gymnastics
- Country represented: Poland
- Club: AZS Warsaw

Łukasz Uhma (born 20 January 1954) is a Polish gymnast. He competed in eight events at the 1976 Summer Olympics.
