= Bernard Decoux =

French gymnast

- Born: 9 September 1956 (age 70)
- Height: 1.64 m (5 ft 5 in)

Gymnastics career
- Discipline: Men's artistic gymnastics
- Country represented: France
Medal record
Men's artistic gymnastics
Representing France
Mediterranean Games
Gold medal – first place	1975 Algiers	Team
Bronze medal – third place	1975 Algiers	Parallel bars

Bernard Decoux (born 9 September 1956) is a French gymnast. He competed in eight events at the 1976 Summer Olympics.
