= Éric Koloko =

French artistic gymnast (born 1950)

- Born: 1 November 1950 (age 75)
- Height: 1.71 m (5 ft 7 in)

Gymnastics career
- Discipline: Men's artistic gymnastics
- Country represented: France
Medal record
Men's artistic gymnastics
Representing France
Mediterranean Games
Gold medal – first place	1975 Algiers	Team
Gold medal – first place	1975 Algiers	Vault
Silver medal – second place	1975 Algiers	Parallel bars

Éric Koloko (born 1 November 1950 in Lille) is a French former artistic gymnast who competed at the 1976 Summer Olympics. He later became a dancer and choreographer and was well known in northern France for his dance routines in tribute to Michael Jackson.
