= Roman Tkaczyk =

Polish gymnast

- Born: 9 January 1954 (age 72) Warsaw, Polish People's Republic
- Height: 1.68 m (5 ft 6 in)

Gymnastics career
- Discipline: Men's artistic gymnastics
- Country represented: Poland
- Club: Legia Warsaw

Roman Tkaczyk (born 9 January 1954) is a Polish gymnast. He competed in eight events at the 1976 Summer Olympics.
