= Nelson Fernández =

Cuban gymnast (born 1957)

- Full name: Nelson Fernández Alonso
- Born: 29 August 1957 (age 69)

Gymnastics career
- Discipline: Men's artistic gymnastics
- Country represented: Cuba

Nelson Fernández Alonso (born 29 August 1957) is a Cuban gymnast. He competed in seven events at the 1976 Summer Olympics.
