= Toncho Todorov =

Bulgarian gymnast (born 1958)

- Тончо Тодоров
- Born: 27 September 1958 (age 67)

Gymnastics career
- Discipline: Men's artistic gymnastics
- Country represented: Bulgaria

Toncho Todorov (Bulgarian: Тончо Тодоров) (born 27 September 1958) is a Bulgarian gymnast. He competed in eight events at the 1976 Summer Olympics.
