= Pierre Leclerc =

Canadian gymnast

- Born: 24 October 1953 (age 72) Sainte-Thérèse, Quebec, Canada

Gymnastics career
- Discipline: Men's artistic gymnastics
- Country represented: Canada

Pierre Leclerc (born 24 October 1953) is a Canadian gymnast. He competed in seven events at the 1976 Summer Olympics.
