= Béla Laufer =

Hungarian gymnast

- Born: 27 July 1955 (age 71) Budapest, Hungarian People's Republic
- Height: 1.65 m (5 ft 5 in)

Gymnastics career
- Discipline: Men's artistic gymnastics
- Country represented: Hungary
- Club: Központi Sportiskola

Béla Laufer (born 27 July 1955) is a Hungarian gymnast. He competed in eight events at the 1976 Summer Olympics.
