= Imre Bánrévi =

Hungarian gymnast

- Born: 14 November 1954 (age 71) Budapest, Hungarian People's Republic
- Height: 1.69 m (5 ft 7 in)

Gymnastics career
- Discipline: Men's artistic gymnastics
- Country represented: Hungary
- Club: Budapesti Honvéd Sportegyesület

Imre Bánrévi (born 14 November 1954) is a Hungarian gymnast. He competed in eight events at the 1976 Summer Olympics.
