= Reinhard Dietze =

German gymnast

- Born: 18 August 1954 Siegen, West Germany
- Died: 9 June 2007 (aged 52) Rodgau, Germany
- Height: 1.80 m (5 ft 11 in)

Gymnastics career
- Discipline: Men's artistic gymnastics
- Country represented: West Germany
- Gym: Turnverein Eichen von 1888

Reinhard Dietze (18 August 1954 – 9 June 2007) was a German gymnast. He competed in eight events at the 1976 Summer Olympics.
