= Bernhard Locher =

Swiss gymnast

- Born: 8 May 1949 (age 77)
- Height: 1.75 m (5 ft 9 in)

Gymnastics career
- Discipline: Men's artistic gymnastics
- Country represented: Switzerland

Bernhard Locher (born 8 May 1949) is a Swiss gymnast. He competed in eight events at the 1976 Summer Olympics.
