= Gustav Tannenberger =

Czech gymnast

- Born: 8 June 1953 (age 73) Vyškov, Czechoslovakia

Gymnastics career
- Discipline: Men's artistic gymnastics
- Country represented: Czechoslovakia

Gustav Tannenberger (born 8 June 1953) is a Czech gymnast. He competed in eight events at the 1976 Summer Olympics.
