= Mariusz Zasada (gymnast) =

Polish gymnast

- Born: 19 January 1954 (age 72) Bydgoszcz, Polish People's Republic
- Height: 1.76 m (5 ft 9 in)

Gymnastics career
- Discipline: Men's artistic gymnastics
- Country represented: Poland
- Club: Zawisza Bydgoszcz

Mariusz Zasada (born 19 January 1954) is a Polish gymnast. He competed in eight events at the 1976 Summer Olympics.
