= Phil Cheetham =

Australian gymnast

- Full name: Philip Cheetham
- Born: 26 October 1954 (age 71)
- Height: 175 cm (5 ft 9 in)

Gymnastics career
- Discipline: Men's artistic gymnastics
- Country represented: Australia

Philip Cheetham (born 26 October 1954) is an Australian gymnast. He competed in seven events at the 1976 Summer Olympics.
