= Marian Pieczka =

Polish gymnast (1951–2024)

- Born: 12 October 1951 Rybnik, Polish People's Republic
- Died: 23 October 2024 (aged 73)
- Height: 1.70 m (5 ft 7 in)

Gymnastics career
- Discipline: Men's artistic gymnastics
- Country represented: Poland
- Club: Górnik Radlin

Marian Pieczka (12 October 1951 – 23 October 2024) was a Polish gymnast. He competed in eight events at the 1976 Summer Olympics. Pieczka died on 23 October 2024, at the age of 73.
