= Árpád Farkas =

Hungarian gymnast (born 1957)

- Born: 28 October 1957 (age 68) Budapest, People's Republic of Hungary
- Height: 1.67 m (5 ft 6 in)

Gymnastics career
- Discipline: Men's artistic gymnastics
- Country represented: Hungary
- Club: Ferencvárosi Torna Club

Árpád Farkas (born 28 October 1957) is a Hungarian gymnast. He competed in eight events at the 1976 Summer Olympics.
