= Ștefan Gal =

Romanian gymnast

- Alternative name: István Csaba Gáll
- Born: 8 August 1951 (age 75) Gheorgheni, Romanian People's Republic
- Height: 1.78 m (5 ft 10 in)

Gymnastics career
- Discipline: Men's artistic gymnastics
- Country represented: Romania

Ștefan Gal (born 8 August 1951) is a Romanian gymnast. He represented Romania in international competitions, including eight events at the 1976 Summer Olympics.
