= Ion Checicheș =

Romanian gymnast

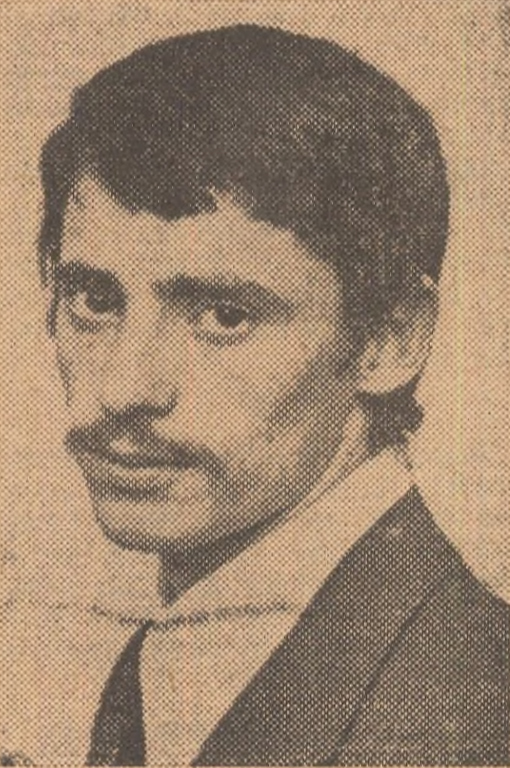
- Born: 18 March 1955 Reșița, Romanian People's Republic
- Died: 2004 (aged 48–49)
- Height: 1.69 m (5 ft 7 in)

Gymnastics career
- Discipline: Men's artistic gymnastics
- Country represented: Romania

Ion Checicheș (18 March 1955 – 2004) was a Romanian gymnast. He competed in eight events at the 1976 Summer Olympics.
