= Ueli Bachmann =

Swiss gymnast

- Full name: Ulrich Bachmann
- Born: 4 May 1950 (age 76)
- Height: 1.71 m (5 ft 7 in)

Gymnastics career
- Discipline: Men's artistic gymnastics
- Country represented: Switzerland

Ulrich "Ueli" Bachmann (born 4 May 1950) is a Swiss gymnast. He competed in eight events at the 1976 Summer Olympics.
