= Angelo Zucca =

Italian gymnast

- Born: 26 December 1955 (age 70) Cagliari, Italy
- Height: 1.67 m (5 ft 6 in)

Gymnastics career
- Discipline: Men's artistic gymnastics
- Country represented: Italy

Angelo Zucca (born 26 December 1955) is an Italian gymnast. He competed in seven events at the 1976 Summer Olympics.
