= Georgi Todorov (gymnast) =

Bulgarian gymnast (born 1949)

- Георги Тодоров
- Born: 19 February 1949 (age 77)

Gymnastics career
- Discipline: Men's artistic gymnastics
- Country represented: Bulgaria

Georgi Todorov (Bulgarian: Георги Тодоров) (born 19 February 1949) is a Bulgarian gymnast. He competed in eight events at the 1976 Summer Olympics.
