= Dimitrios Janulidis =

Czech gymnast

- Born: 1 February 1956 (age 70) Brno, Czechoslovakia

Gymnastics career
- Discipline: Men's artistic gymnastics
- Country represented: Czech Republic

Dimitrios Janulidis (born 1 February 1956) is a Czech gymnast. He competed in eight events at the 1976 Summer Olympics.
