= Maurizio Montesi =

Italian artistic gymnast

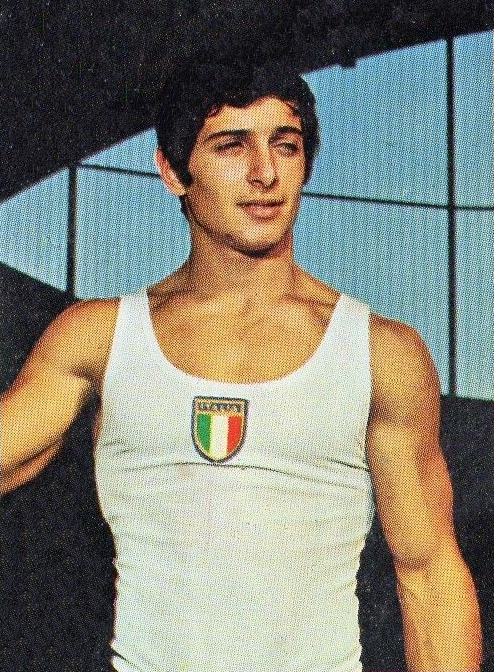

Personal information
- Born: 19 September 1952 (age 73) Forlì, Italy
- Height: 1.68 m (5 ft 6 in)

Gymnastics career
- Discipline: Men's artistic gymnastics
- Country represented: Italy

Maurizio Montesi (born September 19, 1952) is a retired Italian gymnast. He competed at the 1976 Olympics in all artistic gymnastics events with the best result of 29th place on the rings.
