= 1976 Summer Olympics =

Multi-sport event in Montreal, Canada

Games of the XXI Olympiad
- Emblem of the 1976 Summer Olympics
- Location: Montreal, Canada
- Nations: 92
- Athletes: 6,073 (4,813 men, 1,260 women)
- Events: 198 in 21 sports (27 disciplines)
- Opening: July 17, 1976
- Closing: August 1, 1976
- Opened by: Queen Elizabeth II
- Closed by: IOC president Lord Killanin
- Cauldron: Stéphane Préfontaine; Sandra Henderson
- Stadium: Olympic Stadium

The 1976 Summer Olympics (French: Jeux olympiques d'été de 1976), officially known as the Games of the XXI Olympiad (Jeux de la XXIe Olympiade) and officially branded as Montreal 1976 (Montréal 1976), were an international multi-sport event held from July 17 to August 1, 1976, in Montreal, Canada. Montreal was awarded the rights to the 1976 Games at the 69th IOC Session in Amsterdam on May 12, 1970, over the bids of Moscow and Los Angeles. It is the only Summer Olympic Games to be held in Canada. Toronto hosted the 1976 Summer Paralympics the same year as the Montreal Olympics, also the only Summer Paralympics to be held in Canada. Calgary and Vancouver later hosted the Winter Olympic Games in 1988 and 2010, respectively. This was the first of two consecutive Olympic games held in North America, followed by the 1980 Winter Olympics in Lake Placid.

Twenty-nine countries, mostly African, boycotted the Montreal Games when the International Olympic Committee (IOC) refused to ban New Zealand, after the New Zealand national rugby union team had toured South Africa earlier in 1976 in defiance of the United Nations' calls for a sporting embargo due to their racist apartheid policies. The Soviet Union won the most gold and overall medals, with the Eastern Bloc having seven countries in the top 10 of the medal table.

== Host city selection ==
The vote occurred at the 69th IOC Session in Amsterdam, Netherlands on May 12, 1970. While Los Angeles and Moscow were viewed as the favourites, given that they represented the world's two main powers, many of the smaller and neutral countries supported Montreal as an underdog and as a relatively neutral site for the Games. Los Angeles was eliminated after the first round, and Montreal won over Moscow in the second round. Moscow and Los Angeles would go on to host the next two Summer Games, 1980 and 1984 Summer Olympics, respectively, which were also marked by political boycotts (for instance, the U.S.-led boycott of the Soviet invasion of Afghanistan in 1979). One blank vote was cast in the second and final round. The Soviet state media accused the IOC of political corruption following the vote, accusing them of facilitating the Soviet Union's loss.

Toronto had made its third attempt for the Olympics, as did Hamilton. Still, they failed to win the support of the Canadian Olympic Committee, which selected Montreal instead. Another candidate was the Italian city of Florence, which announced that it would withdraw from contention two months before the vote.

1976 Summer Olympics bidding results
City	Country	Round	
City	Country	1	2
Montreal	Canada	25	41
Moscow	Soviet Union	28	28
Los Angeles	United States	17	—

== Organization ==
Robert Bourassa, then the Premier of Quebec, asked Prime Minister Pierre Trudeau to advise Canada's monarch Elizabeth II to attend the opening of the games. However, Bourassa later became unsettled about how unpopular the move might be with sovereigntists in the province, annoying Trudeau, who had already made arrangements. René Lévesque, the leader of the Parti Québécois at the time, sent his own letter to Buckingham Palace, asking the Queen to refuse her prime minister's request, but she did not oblige Lévesque as he was out of his jurisdiction in offering advice to the Sovereign.

In 1976, Trudeau, succumbing to pressure from the People's Republic of China, issued an order barring Taiwan from participating as China in the 1976 Montreal Olympics, although it was technically a matter for the IOC. His action strained relations with the United States – from President Ford to future President Carter and the press. Trudeau's action was widely condemned as having brought shame on Canada by succumbing to political pressure to keep the Taiwanese delegation from competing under its name.

=== Mascot ===
The mascot was a beaver named Amik, whose name was chosen after a national competition.

== Scandals and cost overrun ==
The Oxford Olympics Study estimates the outturn cost of the Montreal 1976 Summer Olympics at US$6.1 billion in 2015 dollars and cost overrun at 720% in real terms. This includes sports-related costs only, that is, operational costs incurred by the organizing committee for the purpose of staging the Games, e.g., expenditures for technology, transportation, workforce, administration, security, catering, ceremonies, and medical services, and direct capital costs incurred by the host city and country or private investors to build, e.g., the competition venues, the Olympic village, international broadcast centre, and media and press centre, which are required to host the Games. Indirect capital costs are not included, such as those for road, rail, or airport infrastructure, or for hotel upgrades or other business investment incurred in preparation for the Games but not directly related to staging the Games. The cost overrun for Montreal 1976 is the highest cost overrun on record for any Olympics. The cost and cost overrun for Montreal 1976 compares with costs of US$4.6 billion and a cost overrun of 51% for Rio de Janeiro in 2016 and $15 billion and 76% for London in 2012. The average cost for the Summer Games from 1960 to 2016 was $5.2 billion in 2015 dollars, and the average cost overrun was 176%.

The cost overruns were caused by unrealistic planning, "constantly changing engineering plans", incompetent management by Montreal mayor Jean Drapeau, corruption during the awarding of construction contracts, as well as delays and sabotage, much of which was due to the Conseil des métiers de la construction union, whose leader was André "Dédé" Desjardins, a notorious figure with organized crime connections. French architect Roger Taillibert, who designed the Olympic stadium, recounted in his 2000 book Notre Cher Stade Olympique that he and Mayor Drapeau tried hard to buy off Desjardins, even taking him to a lunch at the exclusive Ritz-Carlton hotel in a vain attempt to end the "delays". He suggests that Quebec Premier Robert Bourassa ultimately made a secret deal to buy off Desjardins, which allowed work to proceed. Taillibert wrote in Notre Cher Stade Olympique "If the Olympic Games took place, it was thanks to Dede Desjardins. What irony!" The delays and scandals caused Quebec premier Robert Bourassa to take over the preparations of the games in November 1975. The Vélodrome de Montréal, which was scheduled for opening in 1974, was finally completed in June 1976, a month before the opening ceremony.

== Opening ceremony ==
External videos
- 1976 Montreal Olympic Opening Ceremony

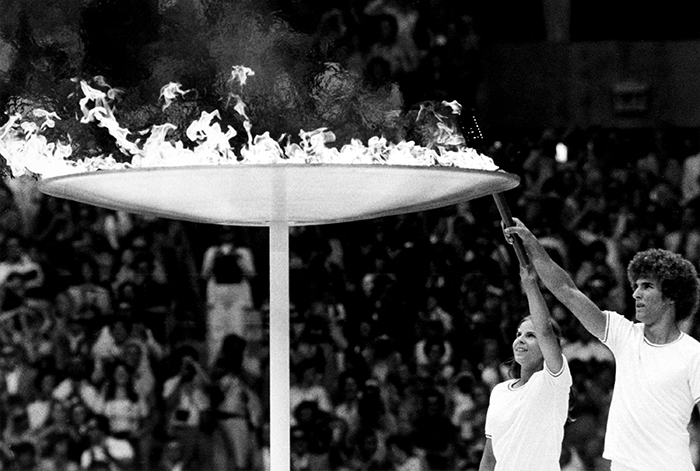
Préfontaine and Henderson lighting the Olympic Flame

The opening ceremony of the 1976 Summer Olympic Games was held at the incomplete Olympic Stadium in Montreal, Quebec on Saturday afternoon, July 17, 1976, in front of an audience of some 73,000 in the stadium and an estimated half billion watching on television.

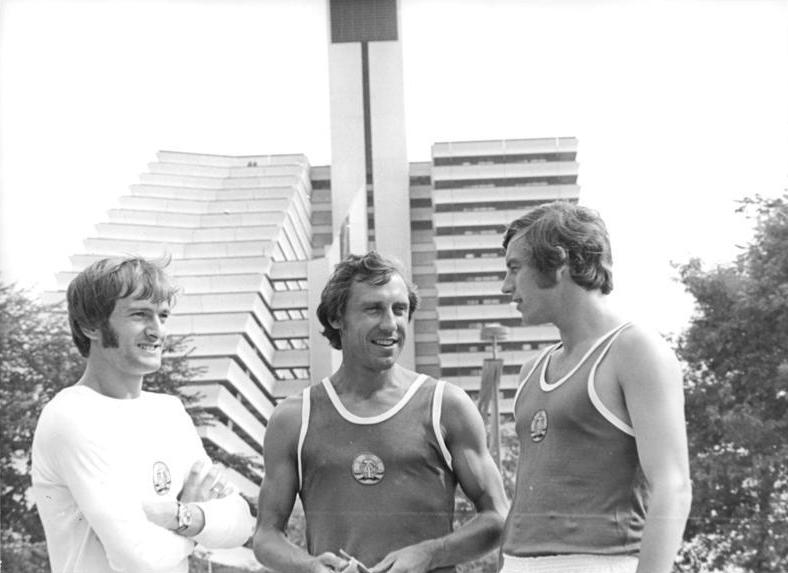
East German athletes Waldemar Cierpinski, Hans-Georg Reimann and Karl-Heinz Stadtmüller at the Olympic Village

Following an air show by the Canadian Forces Air Command's Snowbirds aerobatic flight demonstration squadron in the sunny skies above the stadium, the ceremony officially began at 3:00 pm with a trumpet fanfare and the arrival of Elizabeth II, as Queen of Canada. The Queen was accompanied by Michael Morris, Lord Killanin, President of the International Olympic Committee, and was greeted to an orchestral rendition of 'O Canada', an arrangement that would be used for many years in schools across the country, as well as in the daily sign-off of TV broadcasts in the country.

The Queen entered the Royal Box with her consort, Prince Philip, Duke of Edinburgh, and her son, Prince Andrew. (Her daughter, Princess Anne, was competing as a member of Great Britain's equestrian team. Prince Philip was also president of the International Equestrian Federation (FEI) at the time of the 1976 Summer Olympics.) She joined a number of Canadian and Olympic dignitaries, including: Jules Léger, Governor General of Canada, and his wife, Gabrielle; Prime Minister Pierre Trudeau and wife, Margaret; Robert Bourassa, Premier of the province of Quebec; Roger Rousseau, chief of the Montreal Olympic Organizing Committee (COJOM); Sheila Dunlop, Lady Killanin, wife of the IOC President; Mayor of Montreal, Jean Drapeau, and his wife, Marie-Claire.

The parade of athletes began moments later with the arrival of the Greek team, and concluded with the entrance of the Canadian team. All other teams entered the stadium according to French alphabetical order (as the host city's main language). The ceremony was marked by the adorning of Israel's flag with a black mourning ribbon, in memory of the eleven athletes and coaches killed by Palestinian terrorists at the previous Summer Olympic Games in Munich four years earlier. Although most would eventually boycott the Games in the days to follow, a number of African delegations did march in the parade. Much of the music performed for the parade was arranged by Victor Vogel and was inspired by late Quebecois composer André Mathieu.

Immediately following the parade, a troupe of 80 female dancers dressed in white (representing the 80th anniversary of the revival of the Olympic Games) performed a brief dance in the outline of the Olympic rings. Following that came the official speeches, first by Roger Rousseau, head of the Montreal Olympic organizing committee, and Lord Killanin. Her Majesty was then invited to proclaim the Games open, which she did, first in French, then in English.

Accompanied by the Olympic Hymn, the Olympic flag was carried into the stadium and hoisted at the west end of the stadium. The flag was carried by eight men and hoisted by four women, representing the ten provinces and two territories (at the time) of Canada. As the flag was hoisted, an all-male choir performed an a cappella version of the Olympic Hymn.

Once the flag was hosted, a troupe of Bavarian dancers representing Munich, host of the previous Summer Olympics, entered the stadium with the Antwerp flag. Following a brief dance, that flag was then passed from the Mayor of Munich to the IOC President and then to the Mayor of Montreal. Next came a presentation of traditional Québécois folk dancers. The two troupes merged in dance together to the strains of "Vive le Compagnie" and exited the stadium with the Antwerp Flag, which would be displayed at Montreal City Hall until the opening of the 1980 Summer Olympics in Moscow. Three cannons were then fired, as the 80-member troupe of female dancers unfolded special crates that released doves and ribbons in the five Olympic colours.

Another trumpet fanfare announced the arrival of the Olympic Flame. The torch was carried by 15-year-olds Stéphane Préfontaine and Sandra Henderson, chosen as representatives of the unity within Canada's linguistic heritage. This would also be the first time two people would light the Olympic flame. The duo would make a lap of the stadium and then climbed a staircase on a special dais at the centre of the stadium to set the Olympic flame alight in a temporary white aluminum cauldron. The flame was later transported to a more permanent cauldron just outside the running track to burn throughout the duration of the Games. A choir then performed the Olympic Cantata as onlookers admired the Olympic flame.

The "Youth of Canada" took to the track to perform a colourful choreographed segment with flags, ribbons and a variety of rhythmic gymnast performers. The flag bearers of each team then circled around the speaker's dais as Pierre St-Jean recited the Athletes' Oath and Maurice Forget recited the Judges' Oath, in English and in French, with right hands over their hearts and Canadian flags clutched in their left. Finally, a choral performance of "O Canada" in both French and English marked the close of the opening ceremony, as the announcers concluded with a declaration of the Games motto: 'Vive les Jeux de Montreal! Long Live the Montreal Games'.

The Montreal ceremony would be the last of its kind in Summer Games, as future Olympic ceremonies, beginning with the new Olympic Charter were reinforced before the 1980 Summer Olympics, would become more focused on the host country's culture.

== Security ==
Because of the Munich massacre four years earlier, security at these games was visible. The extensive security measures included the requirement for all workers to hold a valid accreditation. Surveillance of acoustics was installed in the Olympic Village where athletes were accommodated. Furthermore, a systematic installation of closed-circuit television (CCTV) was attempted for the first time in the history of the Olympic games.

== Highlights ==
- These Olympics were the first of two summer games to be organized under the IOC presidency of Michael Morris, 3rd Baron Killanin.
- Taro Aso was a member of the Japanese shooting team. 32 years later, he would be elected as the Prime Minister of Japan.
- The Games were opened by Elizabeth II, as head of state of Canada, and several members of the Royal Family attended the opening ceremonies. This was particularly significant, as these were the first Olympic games hosted on Canadian soil. The Queen's daughter, Princess Anne, also competed in the games as part of the British riding team. Additionally, the Queen's husband, Prince Philip, was President of the International Equestrian Federation (FEI) at the time.
- After a rainstorm doused the Olympic Flame a few days after the games had opened, an official relit the flame using his cigarette lighter. Organizers quickly doused it again and relit it using a backup of the original flame.
- The Israeli team walked into the stadium at the opening ceremony wearing black ribbons in commemoration of the 1972 Munich massacre.
- Women's events were introduced in basketball, handball, and rowing.
- Canada, the host country, finished with five silver and six bronze medals. This was the first time that the host country of the Summer Games had not won any gold medals. This had occurred previously only in the Winter Games – 1924 in Chamonix, France, and 1928 in St. Moritz, Switzerland. This later occurred at the 1984 Winter Games in Sarajevo, Yugoslavia, and again at the 1988 Winter Olympics in Calgary, Alberta, Canada.
- Because of the Munich massacre, security at these games was visible, as it had been earlier in the year at the Winter Games in Innsbruck, Austria.
- At age 14, gymnast Nadia Comăneci of Romania became the first person to score a perfect 10 at the Olympics, recording seven 10.00 scores and winning three gold medals, including the all-around. The scoreboard could hold only 3 digits and the score was shown as 1.00.
- Alberto Juantorena of Cuba became the first man to win both the 400 m and 800 m at the same Olympics.
- Finland's Lasse Virén repeated his 1972 double win in the 5,000 and 10,000 m runs, the first runner to successfully defend a 5,000 m win (since equalled by Great Britain's Mo Farah in 2016). Virén finished 5th in the marathon, thereby failing to equal Emil Zátopek's 1952 achievements.
- Hasely Crawford won Trinidad and Tobago's first Olympic gold medal by finishing first in the 100 meter dash.
- Viktor Saneyev of the Soviet Union won his third consecutive triple jump gold medal, while Klaus Dibiasi of Italy did the same in the platform diving event.
- Boris Onishchenko, a member of the Soviet Union's modern pentathlon team, was disqualified after it was discovered that he had rigged his épée to register a hit when there was not one. Because of this, the Soviet modern pentathlon team was disqualified. Due to his disqualification, he earned the nickname "Boris DISonish-chenko". Many suggested that he was a victim of the Soviet "win it all" mentality.
- Five American boxers – Sugar Ray Leonard, Leon Spinks, Michael Spinks, Leo Randolph and Howard Davis Jr. won gold medals in boxing. This has been often called the greatest Olympic boxing team the United States ever had, and, out of the five American gold medalists in boxing, all but Davis went on to become professional world champions.
- Princess Anne of Great Britain was the only female competitor not to have to submit to a sex test. She was a member of her country's equestrian team.
- Japanese gymnast Shun Fujimoto performed on a broken right knee, and helped the Japanese team win the gold medal for the team championship. Fujimoto broke his leg on the floor exercise, and due to the closeness in the overall standings with the USSR, he hid the extent of the injury. With a broken knee, Fujimoto was able to complete his event on the rings, performing a perfect triple somersault dismount, maintaining perfect posture. He scored a 9.7 thus securing gold for Japan. Years later, when asked if he would do it again, he stated bluntly "No, I would not."
- The U.S. men's swimming team won all but one gold medal. John Naber won four gold medals and a silver medal.
- The East German women's swimming team won all but two gold medals. Kornelia Ender won four gold medals and a silver medal.
- In winning the gold medal for the men's 100m freestyle, Jim Montgomery became the first person to break the 50 second mark in the event, taking first place in the final in a time of 49.99.
- For the first time ever, a woman won an Olympic medal in shooting: American Margaret Murdock caught the silver in the three positions event. Lanny Bassham (another American) and Murdock tied for the first place, but Murdock was placed second after review of the targets. Bassham suggested that two gold medals be given, and after this request was declined, asked Murdock to share the top step with him at the award ceremony. At that time, all the shooting sport events were mixed. Murdock became the first woman to win an Olympic medal in shooting.
- Luann Ryon won the women's Archery gold for the United States; Ryon had never before competed at the international level.
- Bruce Jenner (Note: now known as Caitlyn Jenner.) won the gold medal for decathlon, setting a world record of 8,634 points.
- Greg Louganis won the silver medal for the 10m Platform event in Men's Diving at 16 years old.
- Alex Oakley, the Canadian race walker, became the oldest track and field athlete to compete at the Olympic Games. He was aged 50, and taking part in his fifth Olympics.
- The New Zealand men's national field hockey team beat Australia to win gold, becoming the first non-Asian/European team to win the gold medal in hockey. It is also the first Olympic games in which hockey was played on artificial turf.
- The Polish men's volleyball team came back from being down 2 sets against the USSR to win the gold medal.
- Twenty-year-old Morehouse College student Edwin Moses sets a new world record in the 400m hurdles, less than a year after taking up the event. He is also America's only male individual track gold medalist.
- Thomas Bach of West Germany won a gold medal in the team foil event in fencing. He would later become IOC President.
- Heavyweight boxer Clarence Hill won a bronze medal for Bermuda. His accomplishment makes Bermuda the smallest nation in terms of population to win an Olympic medal at the Summer Olympics.
- East Germany surpassed all expectations for a middle-sized nation by finishing with the second most gold medals in total. The East German women's swimming team won all but two gold medals. Swimmer Kornelia Ender won four gold medals and a silver medal. However, the GDR's achievements were later fundamentally undermined by the exposure of a serious and systematic scheme of doping by the East German sporting authorities. It was later revealed that after injecting athletes with performance-boosting drugs at the Montreal Olympics, East German officials dumped the leftover serum and syringes in the Saint Lawrence River.

== Venues ==
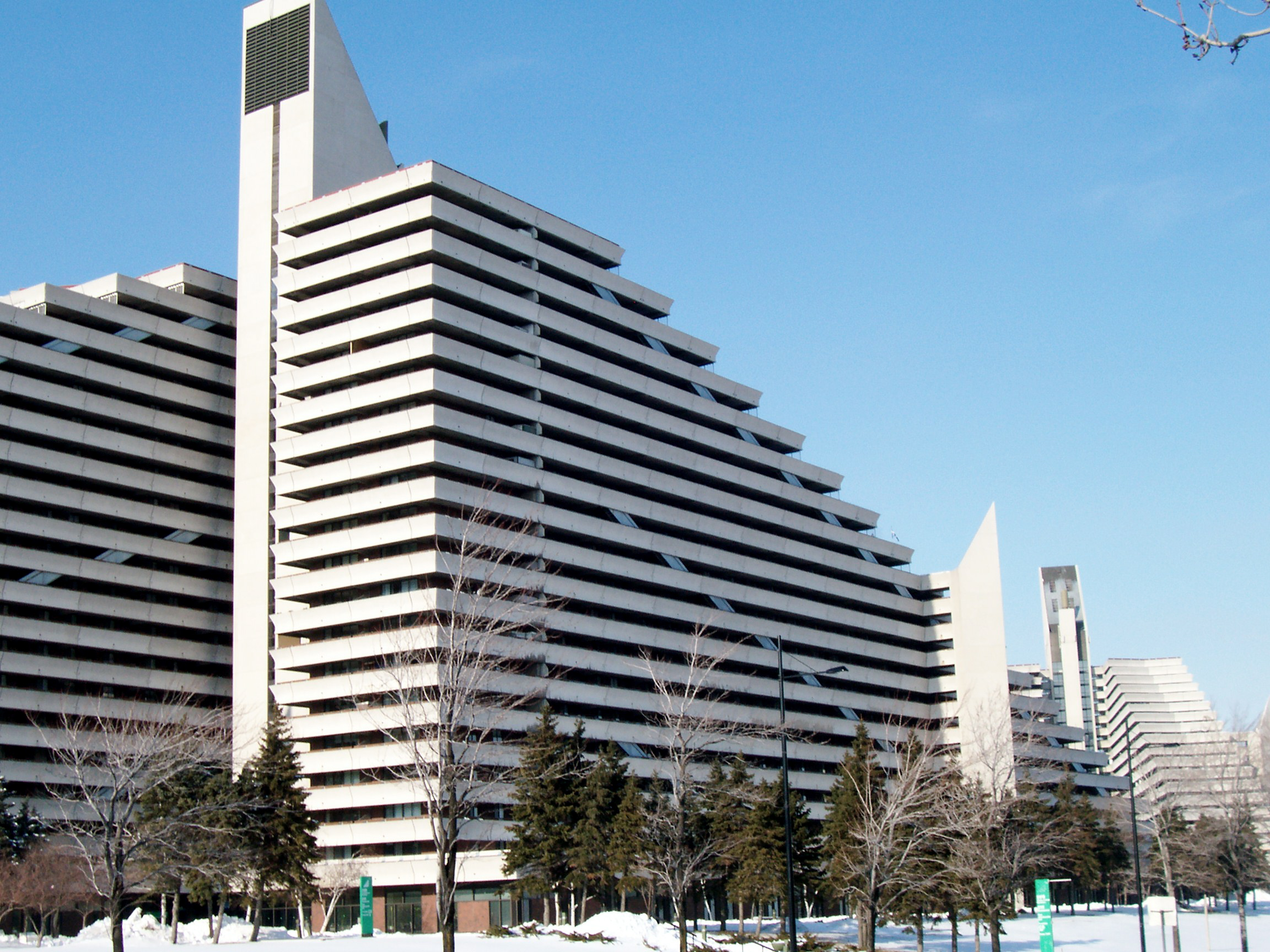
The Olympic Village in January 2008.

=== Montreal Olympic Park ===
- Olympic Stadium – opening/closing ceremonies, athletics, football (final), equestrian (jumping team final)
- Olympic Pool – diving, modern pentathlon (swimming), swimming, water polo (final)
- Olympic Velodrome – cycling (track), judo
- Montreal Botanical Garden – athletics (20 km walk), modern pentathlon (running)
- Maurice Richard Arena – boxing, wrestling (freestyle finals)
- Centre Pierre Charbonneau – wrestling
- Olympic Village – athletes' residence

=== Venues in Greater Montreal ===
- Olympic Basin, Île Notre-Dame – canoeing, rowing
- Claude Robillard Centre – handball, water polo
- Centre Étienne Desmarteau – basketball
- St. Michel Arena – weightlifting
- Paul Sauvé Centre – volleyball
- Montreal Forum – basketball (men's medal matches), boxing (finals), gymnastics, handball (men's medal matches), volleyball (finals)
- Mount Royal Park – cycling (individual road race)
- Quebec Autoroute 40 – cycling (road team time trial)
- Streets of Montreal – athletics (marathon)
- Winter Stadium, Université de Montréal – fencing, modern pentathlon (fencing)
- Molson Stadium, McGill University – field hockey

=== Venues outside Montreal ===
- Olympic Shooting Range, L'Acadie – modern pentathlon (shooting), shooting
- Olympic Archery Field, Joliette – archery
- Olympic Equestrian Centre, Bromont – equestrian (all but jumping team), modern pentathlon (riding)
- Pavilion de l'éducation physique et des sports de l'Université Laval, Quebec City, Quebec – handball preliminaries
- Sherbrooke Stadium, Sherbrooke, Quebec – football preliminaries
- Sherbrooke Sports Palace, Sherbrooke, Quebec – handball preliminaries
- Portsmouth Olympic Harbour, Kingston, Ontario – sailing
- Varsity Stadium, Toronto, Ontario – football preliminaries
- Lansdowne Park, Ottawa, Ontario – football preliminaries

== Sports ==
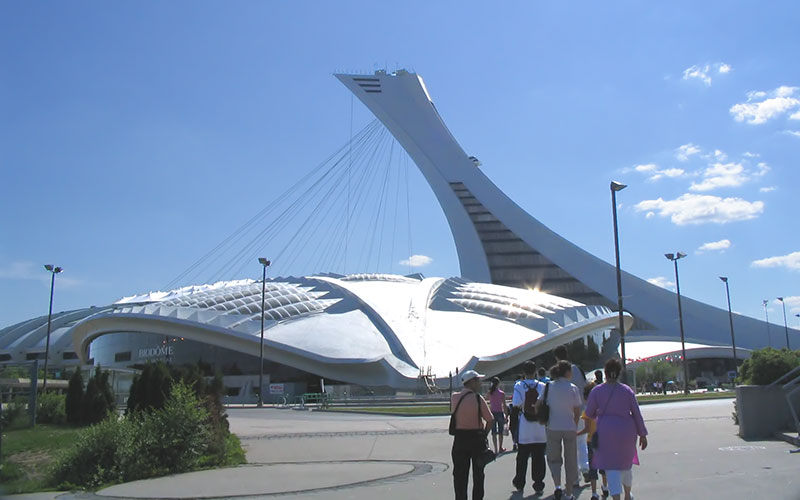
Velodrome (foreground) and Olympic Stadium (its tower completed after the Games), Montreal

There was a desire by the IOC's program commission to reduce the number of competitors and a number of recommendations were put to the IOC's executive board on February 23, 1973, which were all accepted. Rowing was the only sport where the number of competitors was increased, and women were admitted for the first time in Olympic history. The 1976 Summer Olympic program featured 196 events with 198 medal ceremonies in the following 21 sports:

- Aquatics
  - Diving (4)
  - Swimming (26)
  - Water polo (1)
- Archery (2)
- Athletics (37)
- Basketball (2)
- Boxing (11)
- Canoeing (11)
- Cycling
  - Road (2)
  - Track (4)
- Equestrian
  - Dressage (2)
  - Eventing (2)
  - Show jumping (2)
- Fencing (8)
- Field hockey (1)
- Football (1)
- Gymnastics (14)
- Handball (2)
- Judo (6)
- Modern pentathlon (2)
- Rowing (14)
- Sailing (6)
- Shooting (7)
- Volleyball (2)
- Weightlifting (9)
- Wrestling
  - Freestyle (10)
  - Greco-Roman (10)

== Participating National Olympic Committees ==
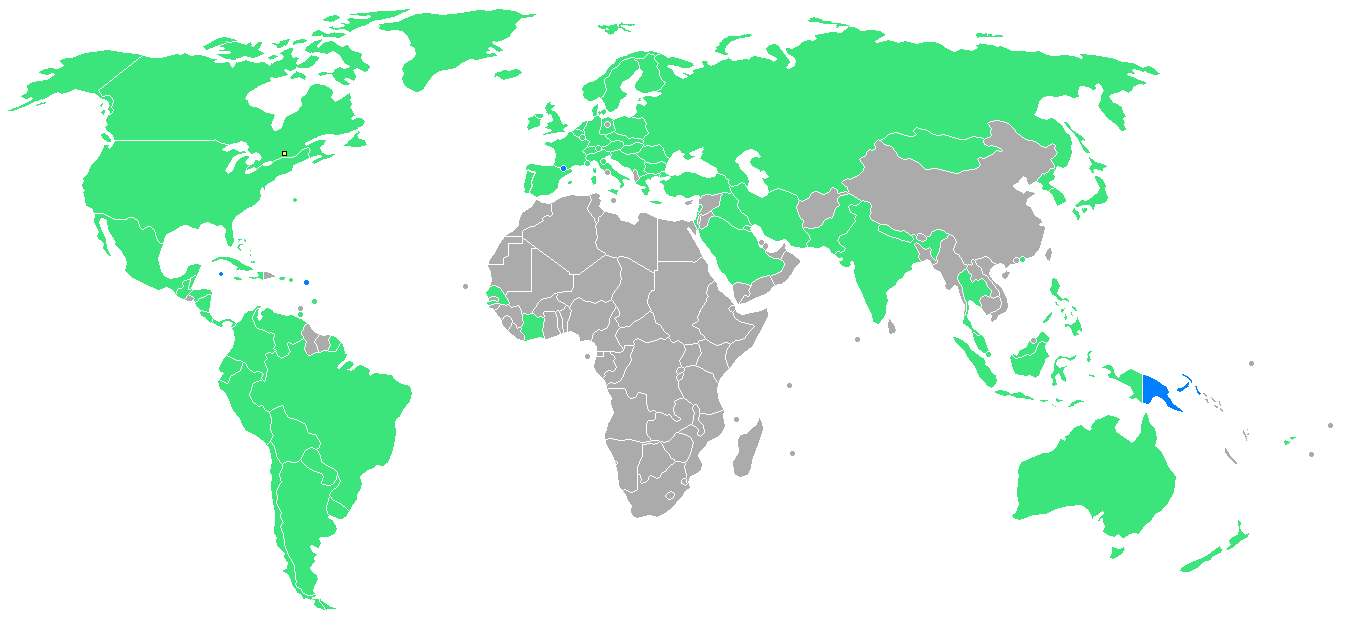
Participating nations

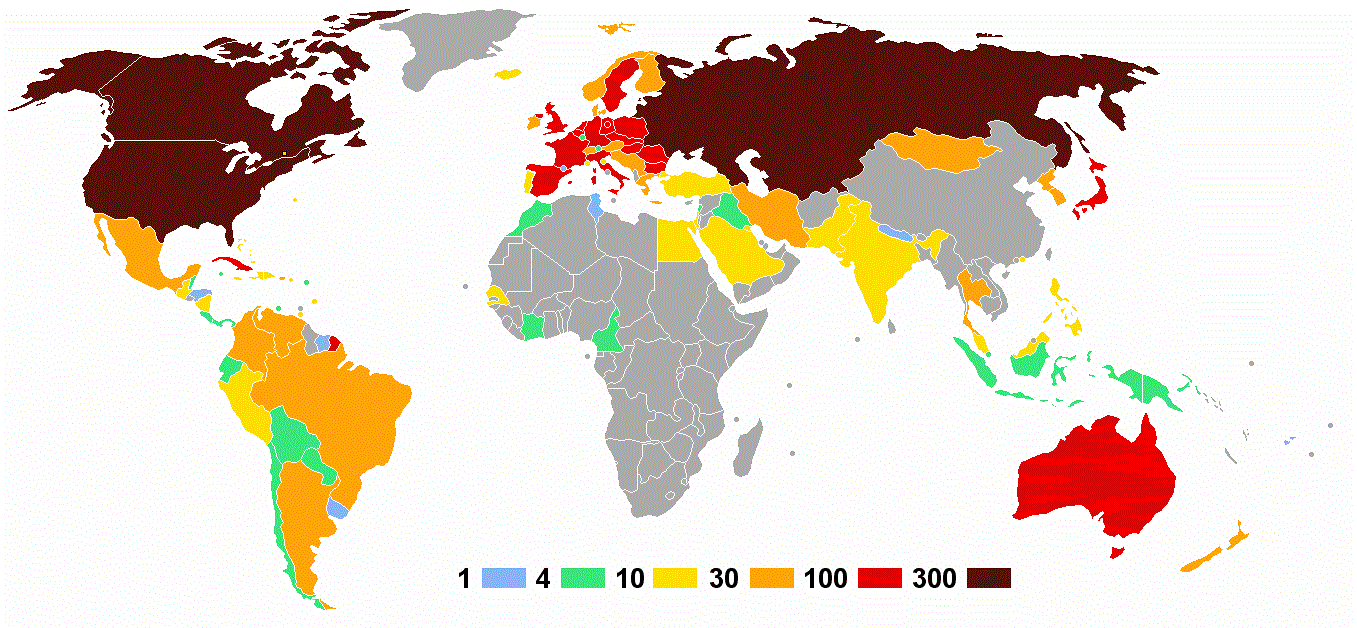
Number of athletes

Four nations made their first Summer Olympic appearance in Montreal: Andorra (which had its overall Olympic debut a few months before in Innsbruck Winter Olympics), Antigua and Barbuda (as Antigua), Cayman Islands, and Papua New Guinea.

Numbers in parentheses indicate the number of athletes from each nation that competed at the Games.

Participating National Olympic Committees
- Andorra (3)
- Antigua and Barbuda (10)
- Argentina (69)
- Australia (180)
- Austria (60)
- Bahamas (11)
- Barbados (11)
- Belgium (101)
- Belize (4)
- Bermuda (16)
- Bolivia (4)
- Brazil (79)
- Bulgaria (158)
- Cameroon (4)
- Canada (385) (host)
- Cayman Islands (2)
- Chile (7)
- Colombia (35)
- Costa Rica (5)
- Cuba (156)
- Czechoslovakia (163)
- Denmark (66)
- Dominican Republic (10)
- Ecuador (5)
- Egypt (26)
- Fiji (2)
- Finland (83)
- France (206)
- East Germany (267)
- West Germany (290)
- Great Britain (242)
- Greece (36)
- Guatemala (28)
- Guyana
- Haiti (13)
- Honduras (3)
- Hong Kong (25)
- Hungary (178)
- Iceland (13)
- India (26)
- Indonesia (7)
- Iran (84)
- Ireland (44)
- Israel (26)
- Italy (210)
- Ivory Coast (8)
- Jamaica (20)
- Japan (213)
- North Korea (38)
- South Korea (50)
- Kuwait (15)
- Lebanon (3)
- Liechtenstein (6)
- Luxembourg (8)
- Malaysia (23)
- Mexico (97)
- Mali
- Monaco (8)
- Mongolia (32)
- Morocco (9)
- Nepal (1)
- Netherlands (108)
- Netherlands Antilles (4)
- New Zealand (80)
- Nicaragua (15)
- Norway (66)
- Pakistan (24)
- Panama (8)
- Papua New Guinea (6)
- Paraguay (4)
- Peru (13)
- Philippines (14)
- Poland (207)
- Portugal (19)
- Puerto Rico (80)
- Romania (157)
- San Marino (10)
- Saudi Arabia (14)
- Senegal (21)
- Singapore (4)
- Soviet Union (410)
- Spain (113)
- Suriname (3)
- Swaziland
- Sweden (116)
- Switzerland (50)
- Thailand (42)
- Trinidad and Tobago (13)
- Tunisia (15)
- Turkey (27)
- United States (396)
- Uruguay (9)
- Venezuela (32)
- Virgin Islands (21)
- Yugoslavia (88)

WD: Athletes from Cameroon, Egypt, Morocco and Tunisia competed on July 18–20 before these nations withdrew from the Games.
Note: Athletes from Guyana, Mali and Swaziland also took part in the Opening Ceremony, but later joined the Congolese-led boycott and withdrew from all competitions.

=== Number of athletes by National Olympic Committees ===
IOC Letter Code	Country	Athletes
AND	Andorra	3
ANT	Antigua and Barbuda	10
ARG	Argentina	69
AUS	Australia	180
AUT	Austria	60
BAH	Bahamas	11
BAR	Barbados	11
BEL	Belgium	101
BIZ	Belize	4
BER	Bermuda	16
BOL	Bolivia	4
BRA	Brazil	79
BUL	Bulgaria	158
CMR	Cameroon	4
CAN	Canada	385
CAY	Cayman Islands	2
CHI	Chile	7
COL	Colombia	35
CRC	Costa Rica	5
CUB	Cuba	156
TCH	Czechoslovakia	163
DEN	Denmark	66
DOM	Dominican Republic	10
ECU	Ecuador	5
EGY	Egypt	26
FIJ	Fiji	2
FIN	Finland	83
FRA	France	206
GDR	East Germany	267
GER	West Germany	290
GBR	Great Britain	242
GRE	Greece	36
GUA	Guatemala	28
HAI	Haiti	13
HON	Honduras	3
HKG	Hong Kong	25
HUN	Hungary	178
ISL	Iceland	13
IND	India	26
INA	Indonesia	7
IRN	Iran	84
IRL	Ireland	44
ISR	Israel	26
ITA	Italy	210
CIV	Ivory Coast	8
JAM	Jamaica	20
JPN	Japan	213
PRK	North Korea	38
KOR	South Korea	50
KUW	Kuwait	15
LIB	Lebanon	3
LIE	Liechtenstein	6
LUX	Luxembourg	8
MAS	Malaysia	23
MEX	Mexico	97
MON	Monaco	8
MGL	Mongolia	32
MAR	Morocco	9
NEP	Nepal	1
HOL	Netherlands	108
AHO	Netherlands Antilles	4
NZL	New Zealand	80
NCA	Nicaragua	15
NOR	Norway	66
PAK	Pakistan	24
PAN	Panama	8
NGY	Papua New Guinea	6
PAR	Paraguay	4
PER	Peru	13
PHI	Philippines	14
POL	Poland	207
POR	Portugal	19
PUR	Puerto Rico	80
ROU	Romania	157
SMR	San Marino	10
ARS	Saudi Arabia	14
SEN	Senegal	21
SIN	Singapore	4
URS	Soviet Union	410
ESP	Spain	113
SUR	Suriname	3
SWE	Sweden	116
SUI	Switzerland	50
THA	Thailand	42
TRI	Trinidad and Tobago	13
TUN	Tunisia	15
TUR	Turkey	27
USA	United States	396
URU	Uruguay	9
VEN	Venezuela	32
ISV	Virgin Islands	21
YUG	Yugoslavia	88
Total		6,073

== Calendar ==
All times are in Eastern Daylight Time (UTC-4)

●	Opening ceremony	Event competitions	●	Event finals	●	Closing ceremony

Date	July															August
Date	17th Sat	18th Sun	19th Mon	20th Tue	21st Wed	22nd Thu	23rd Fri	24th Sat	25th Sun	26th Mon	27th Tue	28th Wed	29th Thu	30th Fri	31st Sat	1st Sun
Archery														● ●		
Athletics							● ●	● ● ●	● ● ● ●	● ● ● ● ● ●		● ● ● ● ●	● ● ● ● ●	● ● ● ●	● ● ● ● ● ● ● ●	
Basketball										●	●					
Boxing															● ● ● ● ● ● ● ● ● ● ●	
Canoeing														● ● ● ● ● ●	● ● ● ● ●	
Cycling		●		●		●		● ●		●						
Diving				●		●			●		●					
Equestrian									● ●		●		●	●		●
Fencing					●	●	●	●	●		●	●	●			
Field hockey														●		
Football															●	
Gymnastics			●	●	● ●	● ● ● ●	● ● ● ● ● ●									
Handball												● ●				
Judo										●	●	●	●	●	●	
Modern pentathlon						● ●										
Rowing								● ● ● ● ● ●	● ● ● ● ● ● ● ●							
Sailing											● ● ● ● ●	●				
Shooting		●	●	●	●		● ●	●								
Swimming		● ●	● ● ● ●	● ● ●	● ● ● ●	● ● ● ●		● ● ● ●	● ● ● ● ●							
Volleyball														● ●		
Water polo											●					
Weightlifting		●	●	●	●	●		●	●		●	●				
Wrestling								● ● ● ● ● ● ● ● ● ●							● ● ● ● ● ● ● ● ● ●	
Total gold medals		5	7	8	9	14	11	26	21	10	12	11	8	17	36	1
Ceremonies	●															●
Date	17th Sat	18th Sun	19th Mon	20th Tue	21st Wed	22nd Thu	23rd Fri	24th Sat	25th Sun	26th Mon	27th Tue	28th Wed	29th Thu	30th Fri	31st Sat	1st Sun
Date	July															August

== Medal count ==
These are the top ten nations that won medals at the 1976 Games. Canada placed 27th with only 11 medals in total, none of them being gold. Canada remains the only host nation of a Summer Olympics to fail to win at least one gold medal. It also did not win any gold medals at the 1988 Winter Olympics in Calgary. However, Canada went on to win the most gold medals at the 2010 Winter Olympics in Vancouver.

The Games were dominated by the Soviet Bloc, with the USSR and its satellites occupying seven out of top ten places in the medal standings.

Rank	Nation	Gold	Silver	Bronze	Total
1	Soviet Union	49	41	35	125
2	East Germany	40	25	25	90
3	United States	34	35	25	94
4	West Germany	10	12	17	39
5	Japan	9	6	10	25
6	Poland	7	6	13	26
7	Bulgaria	6	9	7	22
8	Cuba	6	4	3	13
9	Romania	4	9	14	27
10	Hungary	4	5	13	22
Totals (10 entries)		169	152	162	483

== Non-participating National Olympic Committees ==
Twenty-nine countries boycotted the Games due to the refusal of the IOC to ban New Zealand, after the New Zealand national rugby union team had toured South Africa earlier in 1976. The boycott was led by Congolese official Jean-Claude Ganga. Some of the boycotting nations (including Morocco, Cameroon and Egypt) had already participated, however, and withdrew after the first few days. Senegal and Ivory Coast were the only African countries that competed throughout the duration of the Games. Elsewhere, Afghanistan, Albania, Burma, Iraq, Guyana, Sri Lanka and Syria also opted to join the Congolese-led boycott. South Africa had been banned from the Olympics since 1964 due to its apartheid policies. Other countries, such as El Salvador and Zaire, did not participate in Montreal for purely economic reasons.

Countries boycotting the 1976 Games are shaded blue

=== Republic of China boycott ===
An unrelated boycott of the Montreal Games was the main issue between the Republic of China (ROC) and the People's Republic of China (PRC). The ROC team withdrew from the games when Canada's Liberal government under Pierre Trudeau told it that the name "Republic of China" was not permissible at the Games because Canada had officially recognized the PRC in 1970. Canada attempted a compromise by allowing the ROC the continued use of its national flag and anthem in the Montreal Olympic activities; the ROC refused. In 1979 the IOC established in the Nagoya Resolution that the PRC agreed to participate in IOC activities if the Republic of China was referred to as "Chinese Taipei". Another boycott would occur before the ROC would accept the provisions of the 1979 resolution.

Non-participating National Olympic Committees
- Afghanistan
- Albania
- Algeria
- Benin
- Burma
- Cameroon
- Central African Republic
- Chad
- Congo
- Egypt
- El Salvador
- Ethiopia
- Gabon
- Gambia
- Ghana
- Guyana
- Iraq
- Kenya
- Lesotho
- Libya
- Madagascar
- Malawi
- Mali
- Morocco
- Niger
- Nigeria
- Republic of China
- Somalia
- Sri Lanka
- Sudan
- Swaziland
- Syria
- Tanzania
- Togo
- Tunisia
- Uganda
- Upper Volta
- Zaire
- Zambia

== Doping ==
Researchers from Germany in 2013 reported that West Germany had a state-sponsored doping program, and speculated it was in response to doping in East Germany which had existed for decades.

== Television coverage ==
ABC Sports paid US$25-million for television broadcast rights in the United States, and produced 76.5 hours of coverage.

CBC Sports budgeted less than CAD$2-million and produced 169 hours of coverage, compared to 14 hours of programming at the 1972 Summer Olympics. The network expanded its coverage in 1976, when convinced there would be increased media interest from Canadians. When the network was criticized for spending taxpayer dollars, executive producer Bob Moir toured the country to explain the project and boasted that, "the biggest team in Montreal will be the CBC team... It will be bigger than the Canadian Olympic team". CBC Sports had 245 people on its crew, and aired from 9 am until 11 pm daily, taking breaks only for newscasts. Ted Reynolds and Lloyd Robertson co-hosted coverage of the opening ceremonies. In 1976, CBC Sports began its practice of talking live with athletes immediately after events, and built a studio for the interviews. CBC broadcasters were given information kits on the athletes, prepared by Jack Sullivan, the former sports editor of The Canadian Press.

== Legacy ==
The legacy of the Montreal Olympics is complex. Many citizens regard the Olympiad as a financial disaster for the city as it faced debts for 30 years after the Games had finished. The retractable roof of the Olympic Stadium never properly worked and on several occasions has torn, prompting the stadium to be closed for extended periods of time for repairs. The failure of the Montreal Expos baseball club is largely blamed on the failure of the Olympic Stadium to transition into an effective and popular venue for the club – given the massive capacity of the stadium, it often looked unimpressive even with regular crowds in excess of 20,000 spectators.

The Quebec provincial government took over construction when it became evident in 1975 that work had fallen far behind schedule. Work was still ongoing just weeks before the opening date, and the tower was not built. Mayor Jean Drapeau had confidently predicted in 1970 that "the Olympics can no more have a deficit than a man can have a baby", but the debt racked up to a billion dollars that the Quebec government mandated the city pay in full. This would prompt cartoonist Aislin to draw a pregnant Drapeau on the telephone saying, "Allo, Morgentaler?" in reference to a Montreal abortion provider.

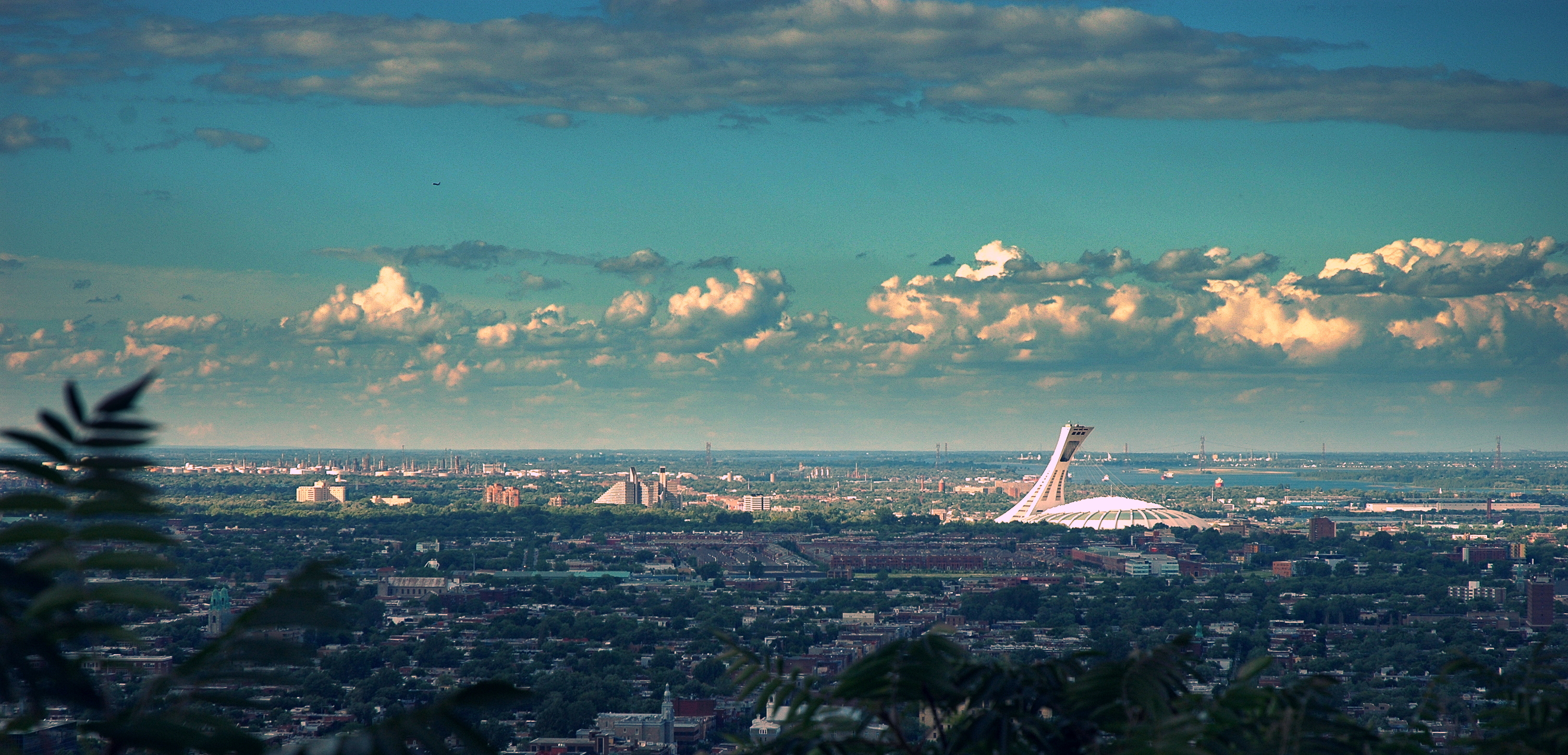
Olympic Stadium, seen next to the Montreal Botanical Garden.

The Olympic Stadium was designed by French architect Roger Taillibert. It is often nicknamed "The Big O" as a reference to both its name and to the doughnut-shape of the permanent component of the stadium's roof, though "The Big Owe" has been used to reference the astronomical cost of the stadium and the 1976 Olympics as a whole. It has never had an effective retractable roof, and the tower (called the Montreal Tower) was completed only eleven years after the Olympic Games, in 1987. In December 2006 the stadium's costs were finally paid in full. The total expenditure (including repairs, renovations, construction, interest, and inflation) amounted to C$1.61 billion. Today the stadium lacks a permanent tenant, as the Montreal Alouettes and Montreal Expos have moved, though it does host some individual games of the Alouettes as well as CF Montréal (formerly the Montreal Impact).

One of the streets surrounding the Olympic Stadium was renamed to honour Pierre de Coubertin, the founder of the Olympics.

The boycott by African nations over the inclusion of New Zealand, whose rugby team had played in South Africa that year, was a contributing factor in the massive protests and civil disobedience that occurred during the 1981 Springbok Tour of New Zealand. Official sporting contacts between South Africa and New Zealand did not occur again until after the fall of apartheid.

Australia's failure to win a gold medal led the country to create the Australian Institute of Sport.

In 2016, the 40th anniversary celebrations were held. In conjunction with the celebrations, the 2016 Quebec Games were held.

The games were the subject of Games of the XXI Olympiad (Jeux de la XXIe olympiade), a 1977 documentary film by Jean Beaudin, Marcel Carrière, Georges Dufaux and Jean-Claude Labrecque.

The 1976 games were also an inspiration for Australian band Black Cab's double album of 2014 entitled Games of the XXI Olympiad.

== See also ==
- 1976 Summer Paralympics
- 1976 Winter Paralympics
- 1976 Winter Olympics
- Olympic Games held in Canada
  - 1976 Summer Olympics – Montreal
  - 1988 Winter Olympics – Calgary
  - 2010 Winter Olympics – Vancouver
- Olympic Games with significant boycotts
  - 1976 Summer Olympics – Montreal – African boycott
  - 1980 Summer Olympics – Moscow – United States-led boycott
  - 1984 Summer Olympics – Los Angeles – Soviet-led boycott
- List of IOC country codes
- Use of performance-enhancing drugs in the Olympic Games — 1976 Montreal
- Corridart

== Citations ==
Summer Olympics
Preceded by Munich	XXI Olympiad; Montreal; 1976	Succeeded by Moscow
