= Gymnastics at the 1972 Summer Olympics – Women's vault =

Women's vault at the Games of the XX Olympiad

Medalists
1st place, gold medalist(s)		Karin Janz	East Germany
2nd place, silver medalist(s)		Erika Zuchold	East Germany
3rd place, bronze medalist(s)		Ludmila Tourischeva	Soviet Union

These are the results of the women's vault competition, one of six events for female competitors in artistic gymnastics at the 1972 Summer Olympics in Munich. The qualification and final rounds took place on August 27, 28 and 31st at the Sports Hall.

== Results ==
=== Qualification ===
One-hundred eighteen gymnasts competed in the compulsory and optional rounds on August 27 and 28. The six highest scoring gymnasts advanced to the final on August 31.

=== Final ===
Rank	Gymnast	C	O	Prelim	Final	Total
Gold medal	Karin Janz (GDR)	9.450	9.800	9.625	9.900	19.525
Silver medal	Erika Zuchold (GDR)	9.450	9.700	9.575	9.700	19.275
Bronze medal	Ludmila Tourischeva (URS)	9.600	9.700	9.650	9.600	19.250
4	Lyubov Burda (URS)	9.500	9.550	9.525	9.700	19.225
5	Olga Korbut (URS)	9.450	9.600	9.525	9.650	19.175
6	Tamara Lazakovich (URS)	9.600	9.300	9.450	9.600	19.050
