= Lyubov Burda =

Russian gymnast

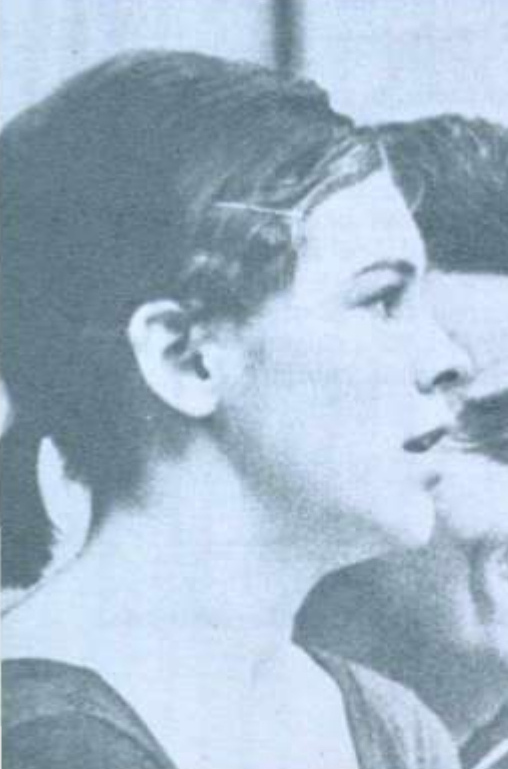
- Full name: Lyubov Viktorovna Burda
- Born: 11 April 1953 (age 73) Voronezh, Russian SFSR, Soviet Union
- Height: 1.68 m (5 ft 6 in)
- Spouse: Nikolai Andrianov (m. 1973; div. 2002)
- Relatives: Aleksandra Andrianova (granddaughter)

Gymnastics career
- Discipline: Women's artistic gymnastics
- Country represented: Soviet Union
- Club: Spartak Voronezh
Medal record
Representing Soviet Union
Olympic Games
| Gold medal – first place | 1968 Mexico City | Team |
| Gold medal – first place | 1972 Munich | Team |
World Championships
| Gold medal – first place | 1970 Ljubljana | Team |
| Bronze medal – third place | 1970 Ljubljana | Vault |

Lyubov Viktorovna Burda (Russian: Любовь Викторовна Бурда; born 11 April 1953) is a retired Soviet artistic gymnast.

== Career ==
In 1967 Burda placed 3rd in the all-around at the USSR Championships (also the USSR Spartakiade that year) as well as placing 2nd on balance beam and floor exercise. At the end of the year, Burda won the junior all-around competition at the USSR Cup as well as winning gold medals in the balance beam and floor exercise finals, which combined junior and senior gymnasts. In 1968 Burda placed 5th in the all-around and 4th in the team competition at the USSR Championships. In July of that year, Burda placed 2nd in the all-around at the USSR Cup.

In 1969 Burda won the gold medal in the all-around at the USSR Championships. At the USSR Cup, Burda placed 2nd in the all-around and 1st on uneven bars. In 1970 Burda won her second all-around title at the USSR Championships as well as a bronze medal with her team. That Summer, Burda won the gold medal at the USSR Cup, as well as a bronze medal on vault. Burda was a member of the Soviet team that won the gold medal at the 1970 World Championships. Individually, she won a bronze medal on vault, shared with teammate Ludmilla Tourischeva. She also placed 5th in the all-around, 4th on uneven bars and 6th on floor exercise. In 1971 Burda won the silver medal in the all-around at the USSR Cup. In 1972 Burda placed 4th in the all-around at the USSR Cup as well as winning silver medals on vault and floor exercise.

Burda was a member of the Soviet team that won the gold medal at the 1970 World Championships. Individually, she won a bronze medal on vault, shared with teammate Ludmilla Tourischeva. In 1972 Burda placed 5th in the all-around at USSR Championships as well as winning silver medals on vault and floor exercise and placing 4th on balance beam and 6th with the team. Individually she had her best international results at the 1972 Olympics, when she placed fifth in the all-around competition, fourth in the vault, and tied for fifth place on the floor.

In 1973 Burda placed 5th in the all-around at the USSR Championships.

== Eponymous skill ==
Burda has one eponymous skill listed in the Code of Points.

| Apparatus | Name | Description | Difficulty (Note: Valid for the 2025–2028 Code of Points) | Added to the Code of Points |
|---|---|---|---|---|
| Uneven bars | Burda | Underswing on high bar or low bar with 1½ turn (540°) to hang | C (0.3) | 1968 Olympic Games |

== Post-retirement ==
She was inducted into the International Gymnastics Hall of Fame in 2001. She was married to Nikolai Andrianov until their divorce in the early 2000s.

== Competitive history ==
| Year | Event | Team | AA | VT | UB | BB | FX |
|---|---|---|---|---|---|---|---|
| 1967 | RSFSR Championships | | | | 1st place, gold medalist(s) | | 1st place, gold medalist(s) |
| 1967 | USSR Championships | | 3rd place, bronze medalist(s) | | 2nd place, silver medalist(s) | | 2nd place, silver medalist(s) |
| 1968 | USSR Championships | | 5 | 3rd place, bronze medalist(s) | 1st place, gold medalist(s) | 1st place, gold medalist(s) | 3rd place, bronze medalist(s) |
| 1968 | USSR Cup | | 2nd place, silver medalist(s) | | | | |
| 1968 | Olympic Games | 1st place, gold medalist(s) | 25 | | | | |
| 1969 | RSFSR Championships | | | 1st place, gold medalist(s) | | | |
| 1969 | Spartakiade Profsoyuz | 2nd place, silver medalist(s) | 1st place, gold medalist(s) | 2nd place, silver medalist(s) | 1st place, gold medalist(s) | 1st place, gold medalist(s) | 1st place, gold medalist(s) |
| 1969 | USSR Championships | | 1st place, gold medalist(s) | 5 | 1st place, gold medalist(s) | | 3rd place, bronze medalist(s) |
| 1969 | USSR Cup | | 6 | | | | |
| 1969 | USSR-GDR-ROM Tri-Meet | 2nd place, silver medalist(s) | | | | 4 | |
| 1970 | Chunichi Cup | | 1st place, gold medalist(s) | | | | |
| 1970 | International Championships of Romania | | 1st place, gold medalist(s) | 1st place, gold medalist(s) | | 1st place, gold medalist(s) | |
| 1970 | USSR Championships | | 1st place, gold medalist(s) | 3rd place, bronze medalist(s) | 6 | 5 | |
| 1970 | USSR Cup | | 1st place, gold medalist(s) | | | | |
| 1970 | World Championships | 1st place, gold medalist(s) | 5 | 3rd place, bronze medalist(s) | 4 | | 6 |
| 1971 | Spartakiade of the Russian Federation | | 1st place, gold medalist(s) | | | | |
| 1971 | USSR Cup | | 2nd place, silver medalist(s) | | | | |
| 1972 | Chunichi Cup | | 7 | | | | |
| 1972 | USSR-FRG-CAN Tri-Meet | 1st place, gold medalist(s) | 2nd place, silver medalist(s) | | | | |
| 1972 | USSR-NOR Dual Meet | 1st place, gold medalist(s) | 2nd place, silver medalist(s) | | | | |
| 1972 | USSR-TCH Dual Meet | 1st place, gold medalist(s) | 1st place, gold medalist(s) | 1st place, gold medalist(s) | 1st place, gold medalist(s) | 2nd place, silver medalist(s) | 2nd place, silver medalist(s) |
| 1972 | USSR Championships | | 5 | 2nd place, silver medalist(s) | 7 | 4 | 2nd place, silver medalist(s) |
| 1972 | USSR Cup | | 4 | | | | |
| 1972 | Olympic Games | 1st place, gold medalist(s) | 5 | 4 | | | 5 |
| 1973 | RSFSR Championships | | 1st place, gold medalist(s) | 1st place, gold medalist(s) | | | 1st place, gold medalist(s) |
| 1973 | Universiade | 1st place, gold medalist(s) | 2nd place, silver medalist(s) | | 2nd place, silver medalist(s) | 2nd place, silver medalist(s) | 3rd place, bronze medalist(s) |
| 1973 | USSR Championships | | 5 | | | | |
