= 1970 World Artistic Gymnastics Championships =

Gymnastics competition

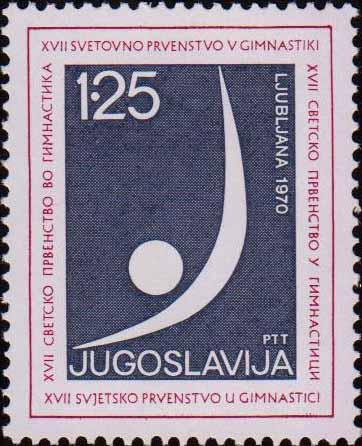
- A Yugoslav stamp featuring the logo of the 1970 World Artistic Gymnastics Championships
- Location: (Socialist Federal Republic of Yugoslavia) Ljubljana, SFR Yugoslavia

The 17th Artistic Gymnastics World Championships were held in Hala Tivoli, Ljubljana, SR Slovenia, SFR Yugoslavia, in 1970.

Cathy Rigby won the first medal for the United States women at the World Championships with a silver on balance beam.

== Results ==
Event	Gold	Silver	Bronze
Men
Team all-around	Japan; Eizo Kenmotsu; Mitsuo Tsukahara; Akinori Nakayama; Fumio Honma; Takuji Hayata; Takeshi Katō	Soviet Union; Mikhail Voronin; Viktor Klimenko; Sergei Diomidov; Viktor Lisitsky; German Bogdanov; Valery Karasyov	East Germany; Matthias Brehme; Klaus Köste; Wolfgang Thüne; Gerhard Dietrich; Peter Kunze; Bernd Schiller
Individual all-around	(Japan) Eizo Kenmotsu	(Japan) Mitsuo Tsukahara	(Japan) Akinori Nakayama
Floor	(Japan) Akinori Nakayama	(Japan) Eizo Kenmotsu	(Japan) Takeshi Katō
Pommel horse	(Socialist Federal Republic of Yugoslavia) Miroslav Cerar	(Japan) Eizo Kenmotsu	(Soviet Union) Viktor Klimenko
Rings	(Japan) Akinori Nakayama	(Japan) Mitsuo Tsukahara	(Soviet Union) Mikhail Voronin
Vault	(Japan) Mitsuo Tsukahara	(Soviet Union) Viktor Klimenko	(Japan) Takeshi Katō
Parallel bars	(Japan) Akinori Nakayama	(Japan) Eizo Kenmotsu (Soviet Union) Mikhail Voronin	none awarded
Horizontal bar	(Japan) Eizo Kenmotsu	(Japan) Akinori Nakayama	(East Germany) Klaus Köste (Japan) Takuji Hayata
Women
Team all-around	Soviet Union; Lyubov Burda; Olga Karaseva; Tamara Lazakovich; Larisa Petrik; Ludmilla Tourischeva; Zinaida Voronina	East Germany; Angelika Hellmann; Karin Janz; Marianne Noack; Richarda Schmeißer; Christine Schmitt; Erika Zuchold	Czechoslovakia; Soňa Brázdová; Luba Krasna; Hana Lišková; Marianna Némethová-Krajčírová; Bohumila Řimnáčová; Marcella Váchová
Individual all-around	(Soviet Union) Ludmilla Tourischeva	(East Germany) Erika Zuchold	(Soviet Union) Zinaida Voronina
Vault	(East Germany) Erika Zuchold	(East Germany) Karin Janz	(Soviet Union) Ludmilla Tourischeva (Soviet Union) Lyubov Burda
Uneven bars	(East Germany) Karin Janz	(Soviet Union) Ludmilla Tourischeva	(Soviet Union) Zinaida Voronina
Balance beam	(East Germany) Erika Zuchold	(United States) Cathy Rigby	(East Germany) Christine Schmitt (Soviet Union) Larisa Petrik
Floor	(Soviet Union) Ludmilla Tourischeva	(Soviet Union) Olga Karaseva	(Soviet Union) Zinaida Voronina

== Medals ==
Rank	Nation	Gold	Silver	Bronze	Total
1	JPN	7	6	4	17
2	URS	3	5	8	16
3	GDR	3	3	3	9
4	YUG	1	0	0	1
5	USA	0	1	0	1
6	TCH	0	0	1	1
Totals (6 entries)		14	15	16	45

== Men ==
=== Team Final ===
Rank	Gymnast	Total
1st place, gold medalist(s)	Japan	571.100
1st place, gold medalist(s)	Eizo Kenmotsu	115.050
1st place, gold medalist(s)	Mitsuo Tsukahara	113.850
1st place, gold medalist(s)	Akinori Nakayama	113.800
1st place, gold medalist(s)	Fumio Honma	113.450
1st place, gold medalist(s)	Takuji Hayata	112.900
1st place, gold medalist(s)	Takeshi Katō	112.850
2nd place, silver medalist(s)	Soviet Union	564.350
2nd place, silver medalist(s)	Mikhail Voronin	113.750
2nd place, silver medalist(s)	Viktor Klimenko	113.600
2nd place, silver medalist(s)	Sergei Diomidov	112.450
2nd place, silver medalist(s)	Viktor Lisitsky	111.650
2nd place, silver medalist(s)	German Bogdanov	110.300
2nd place, silver medalist(s)	Valentin Karasev	108.500
3rd place, bronze medalist(s)	East Germany	553.150
3rd place, bronze medalist(s)	Mathias Brehme	112.100
3rd place, bronze medalist(s)	Klaus Koste	111.400
3rd place, bronze medalist(s)	Wolfgang Thune	110.950
3rd place, bronze medalist(s)	Gerhard Dietrich	109.800
3rd place, bronze medalist(s)	Peter Kunze	107.950
3rd place, bronze medalist(s)	Bernd Schiller	107.700
4	Yugoslavia	549.450
4	Miroslav Cerar	112.500
4	Milenko Kersnic	110.300
4	Janez Brodnik	110.100
4	Miroslav Vratic	109.400
4	Avgust Kussel	106.800
4	Drago Sostaric	102.700
5	Poland	547.050
5	Mikolai Kubica	111.250
5	Wilhelm Kubica	110.950
5	Sylweszter Kubica	109.400
5	Andrzej Szajna	107.450
5	Mieczyslaw Strzalka	105.250
5	Jerzy Kruza	104.950
6	Switzerland	541.750
6	Roland Hurzeler	109.400
6	Peter Rohner	108.650
6	Hans Ettlin	107.950
6	Max Bruhwiler	106.800
6	Edwin Gerutmann	106.450
6	Paul Muller	63.000
7	United States	537.600
7	Makoto Sakamoto	111.650
7	Kanati Allen	107.650
7	Marshall Avener	105.200
7	Brent Simmons	105.150
7	George Greenfield	105.000
7	Tom Lindner	102.150
8	Romania	536.550
8	Petre Mihaiuc	108.450
8	Miroslav Gheorghiu	107.450
8	Gheorghe Paunescu	106.650
8	Nicolae Achim	106.550
8	Dan Grecu	105.550
8	Gheorghe Tohaneanu	104.300

=== All-around ===
Rank	Gymnast	Compulsory	Optional score	Total
1st place, gold medalist(s)	Eizo Kenmotsu (JPN)	57.000	58.050	115.050
2nd place, silver medalist(s)	Mitsuo Tsukahara (JPN)	56.650	57.200	113.850
3rd place, bronze medalist(s)	Akinori Nakayama (JPN)	56.050	57.750	113.800
4	Mikhail Voronin (URS)	56.400	57.350	113.750
5	Viktor Klimenko (URS)	55.900	57.700	113.600
6	Fumio Honma (JPN)	56.650	56.800	113.450
7	Takuji Hayata (JPN)	56.200	56.700	112.900
8	Takeshi Katō (JPN)	56.100	56.750	112.850
9	Miroslav Cerar (YUG)	55.900	56.600	112.500
10	Sergei Diomidov (URS)	55.750	56.700	112.450
11	Matthias Brehme (GDR)	55.800	56.300	112.100
12	Makoto Sakamoto (USA)	55.700	55.950	111.650
12	Viktor Lisitsky (URS)	55.200	56.450	111.650

=== Floor Exercise ===
Rank	Gymnast	Score	Prelim score	Total
1st place, gold medalist(s)	Akinori Nakayama (JPN)	9.550	9.475	19.025
2nd place, silver medalist(s)	Eizo Kenmotsu (JPN)	9.400	9.575	18.975
3rd place, bronze medalist(s)	Takeshi Katō (JPN)	9.400	9.500	18.900
4	Raycho Khristov (BUL)	9.400	9.475	18.875
5	Mitsuo Tsukahara (JPN)	9.400	9.400	18.800
6	Viktor Klimenko (URS)	9.150	9.500	18.650

=== Pommel Horse ===
Rank	Gymnast	Score	Prelim score	Total
1st place, gold medalist(s)	Miroslav Cerar (YUG)	9.650	9.725	19.375
2nd place, silver medalist(s)	Eizo Kenmotsu (JPN)	9.700	9.625	19.325
3rd place, bronze medalist(s)	Viktor Klimenko (URS)	9.500	9.550	19.050
4	Milko Vratic (YUG)	9.450	9.550	19.000
5	Matthias Brehme (GDR)	9.400	9.475	18.875
6	Wilhelm Kubica (POL)	8.950	9.550	18.400

=== Rings ===
Rank	Gymnast	Score	Prelim score	Total
1st place, gold medalist(s)	Akinori Nakayama (JPN)	9.700	9.700	19.400
2nd place, silver medalist(s)	Mitsuo Tsukahara (JPN)	9.650	9.600	19.250
3rd place, bronze medalist(s)	Mikhail Voronin (URS)	9.600	9.625	19.225
4	Takuji Hayata (JPN)	9.450	9.450	18.900
4	Eizo Kenmotsu (JPN)	9.450	9.450	18.900
6	Viktor Lisitsky (URS)	9.250	9.425	18.675

=== Vault ===
Rank	Gymnast	Score	Prelim score	Total
1st place, gold medalist(s)	Mitsuo Tsukahara (JPN)	9.450	9.675	19.125
2nd place, silver medalist(s)	Viktor Klimenko (URS)	9.500	9.500	19.000
3rd place, bronze medalist(s)	Takeshi Katō (JPN)	9.200	9.400	18.600
4	Fumio Honma (JPN)	8.950	9.375	18.325
5	Eizo Kenmotsu (JPN)	8.625	9.500	18.125
6	Akinori Nakayama (JPN)	8.575	9.450	18.025

=== Parallel Bars ===
Rank	Gymnast	Score	Prelim score	Total
1st place, gold medalist(s)	Akinori Nakayama (JPN)	9.700	9.700	19.400
2nd place, silver medalist(s)	Eizo Kenmotsu (JPN)	9.550	9.700	19.250
2nd place, silver medalist(s)	Mikhail Voronin (URS)	9.500	9.750	19.250
4	Takeshi Katō (JPN)	9.550	9.650	19.200
5	Viktor Klimenko (URS)	9.500	9.675	19.175
6	Sergei Diamidov (URS)	9.625	9.300	18.925

=== Horizontal Bar ===
Rank	Gymnast	Score	Prelim score	Total
1st place, gold medalist(s)	Eizo Kenmotsu (JPN)	9.800	9.675	19.475
2nd place, silver medalist(s)	Akinori Nakayama (JPN)	9.700	9.675	19.375
3rd place, bronze medalist(s)	Takuji Hayata (JPN)	9.700	9.650	19.350
3rd place, bronze medalist(s)	Klaus Köste (GDR)	9.700	9.650	19.350
5	Mikhail Voronin (URS)	9.600	9.675	19.275
6	Fumio Honma (JPN)	9.650	9.600	19.250

== Women ==
=== Team Final ===
Rank	Team	Vault (gymnastics)		Uneven bars		Balance beam		Floor (gymnastics)		Total
Rank	Team	C	O	C	O	C	O	C	O	Total
1st place, gold medalist(s)	Soviet Union	95.750		96.100		92.550		96.250		380.650
1st place, gold medalist(s)	Ludmilla Tourischeva	9.700	9.600	9.700	9.800	9.150	9.500	9.700	9.900	77.050
1st place, gold medalist(s)	Zinaida Voronina	9.550	9.500	9.600	9.700	9.150	9.400	9.500	9.750	76.150
1st place, gold medalist(s)	Lyubov Burda	9.700	9.600	9.550	9.700	8.800	9.450	9.500	9.750	75.850
1st place, gold medalist(s)	Larisa Petrik	9.500	9.600	9.400	9.700	9.250	9.450	9.350	9.550	75.800
1st place, gold medalist(s)	Olga Karasyova	9.500	9.500	9.250	9.550	9.000	9.400	9.650	9.800	75.650
1st place, gold medalist(s)	Tamara Lazakovich	9.400	9.400	9.400	9.450	8.000	9.300	9.250	9.300	73.500
2nd place, silver medalist(s)	East Germany	96.000		95.600		93.150		93.000		377.750
2nd place, silver medalist(s)	Erika Zuchold	9.700	9.800	9.600	9.600	9.450	9.550	9.400	9.350	76.450
2nd place, silver medalist(s)	Karin Janz	9.550	9.750	9.700	9.800	9.500	8.700	9.400	9.600	76.000
2nd place, silver medalist(s)	Christine Schmitt	9.500	9.600	9.500	9.600	9.250	9.450	9.250	9.300	75.450
2nd place, silver medalist(s)	Angelika Hellmann	9.600	9.550	9.400	9.400	9.350	9.350	9.250	9.250	75.150
2nd place, silver medalist(s)	Marianne Noack	9.500	9.450	9.450	9.550	9.250	9.300	9.050	9.150	74.700
2nd place, silver medalist(s)	Richarda Schmeißer	9.300	9.300	9.400	9.350	9.200	8.450	9.050	9.100	73.150
3rd place, bronze medalist(s)	Czechoslovakia	94.400		93.900		91.000		92.650		371.950
3rd place, bronze medalist(s)	Marcela Váchová	9.600	9.650	9.450	9.550	9.000	9.250	9.100	9.100	74.700
3rd place, bronze medalist(s)	Bohumila Řimnáčová	9.500	9.500	9.250	9.450	9.100	9.200	9.350	9.300	74.650
3rd place, bronze medalist(s)	Soňa Brázdová	9.550	9.300	8.950	9.300	8.950	9.100	9.250	9.300	73.650
3rd place, bronze medalist(s)	Marianna Némethová	9.300	9.400	9.450	9.700	8.800	8.450	9.200	9.250	73.550
3rd place, bronze medalist(s)	Ľuba Krásna	9.300	9.150	9.150	9.250	9.050	9.000	9.000	8.950	72.850
3rd place, bronze medalist(s)	Hana Lišková	9.300	9.300	9.350	6.650	9.050	9.300	9.400	9.400	71.750
4	Japan	92.650		93.750		92.300		92.950		371.650
4	Miyuki Matsuhisa	9.200	9.550	9.400	9.600	9.500	9.450	9.450	9.500	75.650
4	Kayoko Hashiguchi	9.200	9.300	9.400	9.500	9.100	9.350	9.400	9.350	74.600
4	Kazue Hanyu	9.200	9.450	9.300	9.400	9.250	9.200	9.300	9.300	74.400
4	Mitsuko Mizukawa	9.200	9.250	9.300	9.500	9.050	9.300	9.100	9.200	73.900
4	Yoko Murakami	8.850	9.050	9.100	9.050	8.850	9.250	9.200	9.150	72.500
4	Yoko Nagao	9.100	9.200	9.100	9.350	8.400	9.150	9.100	9.100	72.500
5	Romania	90.550		92.000		90.600		91.350		364.500
5	Elena Ceampelea	9.200	8.900	9.350	9.350	9.250	9.350	9.350	9.550	74.300
5	Paula Ioan	9.400	9.200	8.950	9.250	8.550	9.100	9.200	9.300	72.950
5	Elisabeta Turcu	9.200	9.050	8.950	9.350	8.900	9.050	8.850	9.100	72.450
5	Alina Goreac	9.000	8.850	8.850	9.150	9.100	9.150	8.900	9.200	72.200
5	Olga Stefan	8.900	8.600	9.150	9.350	8.850	8.950	8.900	9.000	71.700
5	Rodica Apateanu	9.000	8.750	9.000	9.300	8.900	8.500	8.850	8.950	71.250
6	Hungary	92.600		91.150		88.900		90.150		362.800
6	Ilona Békési	9.350	9.350	9.200	9.400	8.750	9.100	8.950	9.100	73.200
6	Márta Kelemen	9.250	9.200	8.950	9.400	8.650	9.300	8.850	8.950	72.550
6	Ágnes Bánfai	9.300	9.200	8.950	9.300	9.000	8.630	8.950	9.150	72.500
6	Margit Horváth	9.100	9.150	9.100	9.100	8.800	8.750	9.050	9.150	72.200
6	Mária Gál	9.350	9.200	8.400	8.800	8.750	8.950	8.800	9.100	71.350
6	Zsuzsa Nagy	9.250	9.050	8.900	8.850	8.450	8.850	8.900	8.800	71.050

=== All-around ===
Rank	Gymnast	Compulsory	Optional score	Total
1st place, gold medalist(s)	Ludmilla Tourischeva (URS)	38.800	38.250	77.050
2nd place, silver medalist(s)	Erika Zuchold (GDR)	38.300	38.150	76.450
3rd place, bronze medalist(s)	Zinaida Voronina (URS)	38.350	37.800	76.150
4	Karin Janz (GDR)	37.850	38.150	76.000
5	Lyubov Burda (URS)	38.400	37.450	75.850
6	Larisa Petrik (URS)	38.300	37.500	75.800
7	Olga Karasyova (URS)	38.250	37.400	75.650
7	Miyuki Matsuhisa (JPN)	38.100	37.550	75.650
9	Christine Schmitt (GDR)	37.950	37.500	75.450
10	Angelika Hellmann (GDR)	37.550	37.600	75.150
11	Marianne Noack (GDR)	37.450	37.250	74.700
11	Marcela Váchová (TCH)	37.550	37.150	74.700

=== Vault ===
Rank	Gymnast	Score	Prelim score	Total
1st place, gold medalist(s)	Erika Zuchold (GDR)	9.700	9.750	19.450
2nd place, silver medalist(s)	Karin Janz (GDR)	9.700	9.650	19.350
3rd place, bronze medalist(s)	Ludmilla Tourischeva (URS)	9.650	9.650	19.300
3rd place, bronze medalist(s)	Lyubov Burda (URS)	9.650	9.650	19.300
5	Marcela Váchová (TCH)	9.650	9.625	19.275
6	Angelika Hellmann (GDR)	9.500	9.575	19.075

=== Uneven Bars ===
Rank	Gymnast	Score	Prelim score	Total
1st place, gold medalist(s)	Karin Janz (GDR)	9.800	9.750	19.550
2nd place, silver medalist(s)	Ludmilla Tourischeva (URS)	9.700	9.750	19.450
3rd place, bronze medalist(s)	Zinaida Voronina (URS)	9.650	9.650	19.300
4	Marianna Némethová (TCH)	9.700	9.575	19.275
4	Lyubov Burda (URS)	9.650	9.625	19.275
6	Erika Zuchold (GDR)	9.600	9.600	19.200

=== Balance Beam ===
Rank	Gymnast	Score	Prelim score	Total
1st place, gold medalist(s)	Erika Zuchold (GDR)	9.700	9.500	19.200
2nd place, silver medalist(s)	Cathy Rigby (USA)	9.700	9.350	19.050
3rd place, bronze medalist(s)	Larisa Petrik (URS)	9.400	9.500	18.900
3rd place, bronze medalist(s)	Christine Schmitt (GDR)	9.550	9.350	18.900
5	Angelika Hellmann (GDR)	9.500	9.350	18.850
6	Miyuki Matsuhisa (JPN)	8.650	9.475	18.125

=== Floor Exercise ===
Rank	Gymnast	Score	Prelim score	Total
1st place, gold medalist(s)	Ludmilla Tourischeva (URS)	9.850	9.800	19.650
2nd place, silver medalist(s)	Olga Karasyova (URS)	9.800	9.725	19.525
3rd place, bronze medalist(s)	Zinaida Voronina (URS)	9.750	9.625	19.375
4	Karin Janz (GDR)	9.700	9.500	19.200
5	Miyuki Matsuhisa (JPN)	9.600	9.475	19.075
6	Lyubov Burda (URS)	8.700	9.525	18.225
