= 1971 European Women's Artistic Gymnastics Championships =

8th European Women's Artistic Gymnastics Championships
- Location: Minsk, Byelorussian SSR, Soviet Union
- Dates: 15–17 October 1971

The 8th European Women's Artistic Gymnastics Championships were held in Minsk, Soviet Union, in 1971.

== Medalists ==
Event	Gold	Silver	Bronze
Seniors
All-Around	Tamara Lazakovich (URS); Ludmilla Tourischeva (URS)		Erika Zuchold (GDR)
Vault	Ludmilla Tourischeva (URS)	Tamara Lazakovich (URS)	Erika Zuchold (GDR)
Uneven Bars	Tamara Lazakovich (URS)	Ludmilla Tourischeva (URS)	Angelika Hellmann (GDR)
Balance Beam	Tamara Lazakovich (URS)	Ludmilla Tourischeva (URS)	Erika Zuchold (GDR)
Floor	Ludmilla Tourischeva (URS)	Tamara Lazakovich (URS)	Erika Zuchold (GDR)
