= Tamara Lazakovich =

Soviet gymnast (1954–1992)

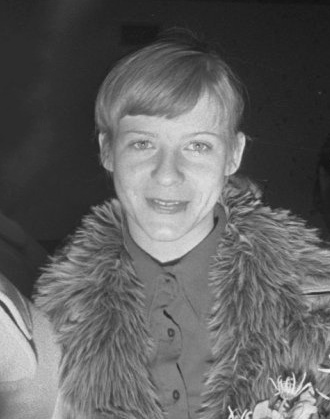
- Tamara Lazakovich in 1972

Personal information
- Full name: Tamara Vasilyevna Lazakovich
- Born: 11 March 1954 Gusevo, Kaliningrad Oblast, Russian SFSR, Soviet Union
- Died: 1 November 1992 (aged 38) Vitebsk, Belarus
- Height: 1.62 m (5 ft 4 in)

Gymnastics career
- Discipline: Women's artistic gymnastics
- Country represented: Soviet Union
- Club: Dynamo Vitebsk
Medal record
Representing Soviet Union
Olympic Games
Gold medal – first place	1972 Munich	Team
Silver medal – second place	1972 Munich	Balance beam
Bronze medal – third place	1972 Munich	All-around
Bronze medal – third place	1972 Munich	Floor exercise
World Championships
Gold medal – first place	1970 Ljubljana	Team
European Championships
Gold medal – first place	1971 Minsk	All-Around
Gold medal – first place	1971 Minsk	Uneven bars
Gold medal – first place	1971 Minsk	Balance beam
Silver medal – second place	1971 Minsk	Vault
Silver medal – second place	1971 Minsk	Floor exercise

Tamara Vasilyevna Lazakovich (Russian: Тамара Васильевна Лазакович; 11 March 1954 – 1 November 1992) was a Soviet artistic gymnast who competed at the 1972 Summer Olympics.

Described as a "perky sparrow" with a "purity of line", Lazakovich was spotted by her compatriot, Olympic champion Larisa Petrik, in 1961 and brought to prominent coaches in the Belarusian system. She showed promise early on, winning several gold and silver medals at the 1968 and 1969 USSR Junior Championships. She debuted as a senior at the 1970 World Artistic Gymnastics Championships. The Soviets won the gold medal in the team competition, but a low score of 8.00 on the balance beam during the compulsory round dropped Lazakovich to 21st place in the individual all-around, the lowest on the Soviet team.

At the 1971 European Championships, Lazakovich tied her teammate Ludmilla Tourischeva—a European, World, and Olympic all-around champion—for the all-around title. She also took two of the four individual event titles (uneven bars and balance beam) and won silver on the other two (vault and floor exercise). In addition to being co-champions in the all-around, she or Tourischeva occupied the gold and silver positions on the podium on all five individual events, keeping Erika Zuchold of East Germany in third place on four out of five of them.

The next year, at the 1972 Olympics, where Tourischeva dominated the all-around and Soviet teammate Olga Korbut stole the crowd's and media's attention with her daring moves and charismatic personality, Lazakovich quietly worked her way onto the individual podium three times, winning the bronze medal in the individual all-around and floor exercise, plus silver on the balance beam behind Korbut. Her four-event total of 38.25 was the highest of any gymnast in the team compulsories segment of the competition.

Lazakovich retired after the Olympics and worked as a gymnastics coach in Vitebsk. She struggled with alcoholism and was imprisoned for several years for larceny. She died at the age of 38 from alcohol-related illnesses.
