= Diane Foote =

New Zealand Olympic gymnast (born 1954)

Personal information
- Birth name: Diane Rena Foote
- Born: 1 September 1954 (age 71); Dunedin, New Zealand
- Height: 167 cm (5 ft 6 in)

Sport
- Country: New Zealand
- Sport: Artistic gymnastics

Diane Rena Foote (also Dianne, now Moreland, born 1 September 1954) is a New Zealand Olympic gymnast.

Foote was born in 1954 in Dunedin, New Zealand. She is a descendant of Harry Arthur Foote, who founded the Dunedin freight company H A Foote Haulage Limited in 1918. She owns 14% of the company shares.

Foote represented her country at the 1972 Summer Olympics in Munich, Germany, in gymnastics. In the vault, she came 69th. In the floor exercise, she was 99th. On the uneven bars, she came 113th. On the balance beam, she was 94th. In the Women's individual all-around preliminary round, she was ranked 104th of 118 competitors. Only the top-placed 36 competitors made it into the final round. She is listed as New Zealand Olympic competitor number 275. When Barry Maister as head of the New Zealand Olympic Committee (NZOC) had the project of honouring the country's Olympic competitors, Foote and fellow 1972 gymnast Terry Sale were among the 21 individuals that the NZOC had lost contact with.

Foote took on the surname Moreland when she married, and she now lives in the Tauranga suburb of Papamoa Beach.
