= Korbut flip =

Gymnastics skill

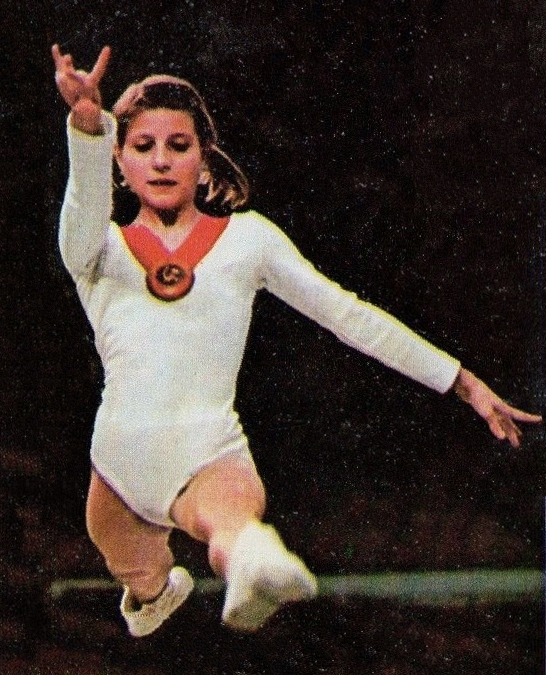
Olga Korbut 1973

The Korbut flip is a gymnastics skill performed on either of two different apparatuses. Both were first performed internationally by the Soviet gymnast Olga Korbut.

One version was performed on the uneven bars, where the gymnast, from a stand on the high bar, performs a back flip and regrasps the bar. Korbut performed the move at the 1972 Summer Olympics, where it was the first high bar release move performed on the uneven bars in international competition. In 1977, Soviet gymnast Elena Mukhina modified the flip by adding a full twist. The movement was later modified in the 1980s when it was performed towards the low bar; that is, the gymnast's flip takes place above the low bar.

The Code of Points was later modified to ban standing on the high bar during routines, as pauses in the swinging motion of the routine were no longer considered acceptable.

The skill is also performed on the balance beam, performed as a backward handspring that is landed in a straddled position on the beam. This movement has been modified to include twists and piked or tucked legs and is frequently performed in sequence with other movements. Unlike its counterpart on the uneven bars, the Korbut flip on beam is today considered a relatively simple skill, valued at only a "B" level in the 2017 Code of Points.

Other gymnasts who have performed the skill's uneven bars variation include Radka Zemanova (1980), Steffi Kräker (1977), Emily May (1981), Lyubov Bogdanova (1974) and Natalia Shaposhnikova (1976).
