= International Gymnastics Hall of Fame =

Hall of fame in Oklahoma, US

Coordinates: 35°31′25″N 97°28′32″W

The International Gymnastics Hall of Fame, located in Oklahoma City, USA, is a hall of fame dedicated to honoring the achievements and contributions of the world's greatest competitors, coaches and authorities in artistic gymnastics.

The early IGHOF was founded in 1972 by Frank Wells of the National Gymnastics Clinic. It had only one member, Olga Korbut, and disbanded in the late 1970s. The current museum was founded in 1986 by Glenn Sundby, publisher of the International Gymnast Magazine. Initially located in Oceanside, California, it was moved into Oklahoma City in 1997.

The Hall of Fame is housed inside the Science Museum Oklahoma, formerly called the Omniplex.

== List of inductees ==
Name	Country	Year inducted
Olga Korbut	Soviet Union	1988
Nadia Comăneci	Romania	1993
Masao Takemoto	Japan	1997
Leon Štukelj	Kingdom of Yugoslavia	1997
Cathy Rigby	United States	1997
Mary Lou Retton	United States	1997
Béla Károlyi	Romania	1997
Jack Günthard	Switzerland	1997
Arthur Gander	Switzerland	1997
Bart Conner	United States	1997
Peter Vidmar	United States	1998
Ludmilla Tourischeva	Soviet Union	1998
Takashi Ono	Japan	1998
Larisa Latynina	Soviet Union	1998
Savino Guglielmetti	Italy	1998
Věra Čáslavská	Czechoslovakia	1998
Yuri Titov	Soviet Union	1999
Eugen Mack	Switzerland	1999
Nellie Kim	Soviet Union	1999
Yukio Endo	Japan	1999
Miroslav Cerar	Slovenia	1999
Frank Bare Sr.	United States	1999
Haruhiro Yamashita	Japan	2000
Ecaterina Szabo (Katalin Szabó)	Romania	2000
Li Ning	China	2000
Maxi Gnauck	East Germany	2000
Teodora Ungureanu	Romania	2001
William Thoresson	Sweden	2001
Sawao Kato	Japan	2001
Bruno Grandi	Italy	2001
Lyubov Burda	Soviet Union	2001
Nikolai Andrianov	Soviet Union	2001
Berthe Villancher	France	2002
Daniela Silivaș	Romania	2002
Boris Shakhlin	Soviet Union	2002
Ágnes Keleti	Hungary	2002
Keiko Tanaka-Ikeda	Japan	2002
Polina Astakhova	Soviet Union	2002
Kurt Thomas	United States	2003
Franco Menichelli	Italy	2003
Karin Büttner-Janz	East Germany	2003
Dmitry Bilozerchev	Soviet Union	2003
Max Bangerter	Switzerland	2003
Yelena Shushunova	Soviet Union	2004
Heikki Savolainen	Finland	2004
Helena Rakoczy	Poland	2004
Takuji Hayata	Japan	2004
Alexander Dityatin	Soviet Union	2004
Erika Zuchold	East Germany	2005
Akinori Nakayama	Japan	2005
Valeri Liukin	Soviet Union	2005
Svetlana Boginskaya	Soviet Union	2005
Shannon Miller	United States	2006
Natalia Kuchinskaya	Soviet Union	2006
Eizo Kenmotsu	Japan	2006
Vladimir Artemov	Soviet Union	2006
Shigeru Kasamatsu	Japan	2007
Eberhard Gienger	Germany	2007
Yelena Davydova	Soviet Union	2007
Simona Amânar	Romania	2007
Ma Yanhong	China	2008
Shuji Tsurumi	Japan	2008
Lilia Podkopayeva	Ukraine	2008
Stoyan Deltchev	Bulgaria	2008
Vitaly Scherbo	Belarus	2009
Elvira Saadi	Uzbekistan	2009
Dominique Dawes	United States	2009
Viktor Chukarin	Ukraine	2009
Octavian Bellu	Romania	2009
Mikhail Voronin	Russia	2010
Yuri Korolev	Russia	2010
Henrietta Ónodi	Hungary	2010
Steffi Kräker	East Germany	2011
Leonid Arkayev	Russia	2011
Aleksandr Tkachyov	Russia	2011
Lavinia Miloșovici	Romania	2011
Natalia Shaposhnikova	Russia	2012
Kim Zmeskal	United States	2012
Zoltán Magyar	Hungary	2012
Gina Gogean	Romania	2013
Albert Azaryan	Armenia	2013
Natalia Yurchenko	Soviet Union	2014
Li Yuejiu	China	2014
Klaus Köste	East Germany	2014
Jackie Fie	United States	2014
Elena Zamolodchikova	Russia	2015
Valery Belenky	Azerbaijan, Soviet Union	2015
Ihor Korobchynskyi	Ukraine	2016
Tatiana Lysenko	Ukraine	2016
Jordan Jovtchev	Bulgaria	2016
Aurelia Dobre	Romania	2016
Alexei Nemov	Russia	2017
Alicia Sacramone	United States	2017
Oksana Chusovitina	Uzbekistan	2017
Shun Fujimoto	Japan	2017
Nastia Liukin	United States	2018
Andreea Răducan	Romania	2018
Paul Hamm	United States	2018
Ivan Ivankov	Belarus	2019
Li Xiaopeng	China	2019
Maria Filatova	Russia	2019
Shawn Johnson	United States	2019
Maria Gorokhovskaya	Soviet Union	2021
Margit Korondi	Hungary	2021
Tamara Manina	Soviet Union	2021
Olga Tass	Hungary	2021
Sofia Muratova	Soviet Union	2021
Yelena Mukhina	Soviet Union	2021
Tatiana Gutsu	Soviet Union, Ukraine	2022
Fabian Hambüchen	Germany	2022
Chellsie Memmel	United States	2022
Cătălina Ponor	Romania	2022
Mitch Gaylord	United States	2023
Kōji Gushiken	Japan	2023
Oksana Omelianchik	Ukraine	2023
Julianne McNamara	United States	2024
Carly Patterson	United States	2024
Rustam Sharipov	Ukraine	2024
Josef Stalder	Switzerland	2024
Beth Tweddle	Great Britain	2025
Andreas Wecker	Germany	2025
Cătălina Ponor	Romania	2025
Cristina Bontaș	Romania	2026
Yuri Chechi	Italy	2026
Vanessa Ferrari	Italy	2026
Yang Wei	China	2026
