= Gymnastics at the 1972 Summer Olympics – Women's balance beam =

Women's balance beam at the Games of the XX Olympiad

Medalists
1st place, gold medalist(s)		Olga Korbut	Soviet Union
2nd place, silver medalist(s)		Tamara Lazakovich	Soviet Union
3rd place, bronze medalist(s)		Karin Janz	East Germany

These are the results of the women's balance beam competition, one of six events for female competitors in artistic gymnastics at the 1972 Summer Olympics in Munich. The qualification and final rounds took place on August 27, 28 and 31st at the Sports Hall.

== Results ==
=== Qualification ===
One-hundred eighteen gymnasts competed in the compulsory and optional rounds on August 27 and 28. The six highest scoring gymnasts advanced to the final on August 31.

=== Final ===
Rank	Gymnast	C	O	Prelim	Final	Total
Gold medal	Olga Korbut (URS)	9.250	9.750	9.500	9.900	19.400
Silver medal	Tamara Lazakovich (URS)	9.400	9.750	9.575	9.800	19.375
Bronze medal	Karin Janz (GDR)	9.350	9.500	9.425	9.550	18.975
4	Monika Császár (HUN)	9.250	9.400	9.325	9.600	18.925
5	Ludmila Tourischeva (URS)	9.050	9.750	9.400	9.400	18.800
6	Erika Zuchold (GDR)	9.250	9.350	9.300	9.400	18.700
