= 1969 European Women's Artistic Gymnastics Championships =

7th European Women's Artistic Gymnastics Championships
- Location: Landskrona, Sweden
- Dates: 17–18 May 1969

The 7th European Women's Artistic Gymnastics Championships were held in Landskrona, Sweden in May 1969.

== Medalists ==
Event	Gold	Silver	Bronze
Seniors
All-Around	Karin Janz (GDR)	Olga Karasyova (URS)	Ludmilla Tourischeva (URS); Erika Zuchold (GDR)
Vault	Karin Janz (GDR)	Erika Zuchold (GDR)	Olga Karasyova (URS)
Uneven Bars	Karin Janz (GDR)	Olga Karasyova (URS)	Ludmilla Tourischeva (URS)
Balance Beam	Karin Janz (GDR)	Olga Karasyova (URS)	Jindra Košťálová (TCH)
Floor	Olga Karasyova (URS)	Karin Janz (GDR)	Ludmilla Tourischeva (URS); Jindra Košťálová (TCH)
