= Paul Ziert =

American gymnastics coach

Biographical details
- Education: Stanford University (Master's)

Playing career
- 1962–1965: Illinois State

Coaching career (HC unless noted)
- 1974–1983: Oklahoma (men's)
- 1981–1983: Oklahoma (women's)

Head coaching record
- Overall: 66–28 (men's); 27–26 (women's)

Accomplishments and honors

Championships
- 2X NCAA Division I Men's Championship (1977, 1978); 4X Big Eight Men's Champions (1977, 1978, 1979, 1981)

Paul Ziert is a former gymnastics coach. Ziert was a member of the gymnastics team at Illinois State University. Ziert won the NAIA national championship in the free exercise and tumbling in 1965. Ziert was the head gymnastics coach at the University of Oklahoma. He recruited Bart Conner to the school. In 1977 and 1978, Ziert's teams won the NCAA Men's Gymnastics championship. He coached the Oklahoma men's gymnastics team from 1974 to 1983, and the women's team from 1981 to 1983. Ziert cowrote a book with Conner, Winning the Gold, in 1985. Ziert currently publishes International Gymnast Magazine.

In 2025, he was inducted into the International Gymnastics Hall of Fame.
