= List of Olympic female artistic gymnasts for New Zealand =

Gymnastics events have been staged at the Olympic Games since 1896, with women competing for the time at the 1928 Olympic Games. New Zealand sent female artistic gymnasts to the Olympic Games for the first time in 1964.

== Gymnasts ==
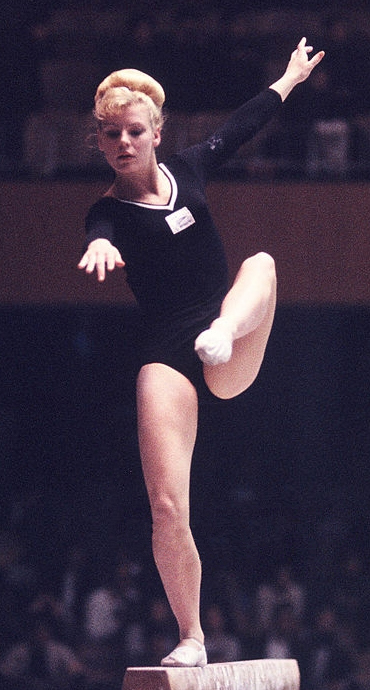
Pauline Gardiner at the 1964 Olympic Games

| Gymnast | Years | Ref. |
|---|---|---|
| Georgia-Rose Brown | 2024 | |
| Diane Foote | 1972 | |
| Pauline Gardiner | 1964 | |
| Theodora Hill | 1964 | |
| Courtney McGregor | 2016 | |
| Laura Robertson | 2000 | |
| Jean Spencer | 1964 | |

== See also ==
- New Zealand at the 1964 Summer Olympics
- New Zealand at the 1972 Summer Olympics
- New Zealand at the 2000 Summer Olympics
- New Zealand at the 2016 Summer Olympics
- New Zealand at the 2024 Summer Olympics
