= Takuji Hayata =

Japanese artistic gymnast

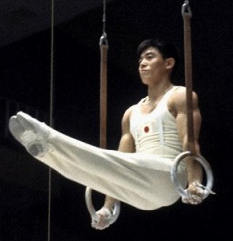
- Takuji Hayata at the 1964 Olympics

Personal information
- Born: October 10, 1940 (age 85) Tanabe, Wakayama, Japan
- Height: 1.60 m (5 ft 3 in)

Gymnastics career
- Discipline: Men's artistic gymnastics
- Country represented: Japan
Medal record
Olympic Games
Gold medal – first place	1964 Tokyo	Rings
Gold medal – first place	1964 Tokyo	Team
World Championships
Gold medal – first place	1970 Ljubljana	Team
Bronze medal – third place	1970 Ljubljana	Horizontal bar

Takuji Hayata (早田 卓次, Hayata Takuji; born October 10, 1940) is a retired Japanese gymnast. At the 1964 Summer Olympics in Tokyo, he won gold medals in the rings and team all-around events. Individually he finished eighth all around. At the 1970 World Championship he won a bronze medal at the horizontal bar, as well as a team gold.

Later he became a coach and lead the Japanese team at the 1976 Summer Olympics and the 1978 World Championships. He also became a physical education professor at Nippon University, and was inducted into the International Gymnastics Hall of Fame in 2004.
