= Berthe Villancher =

French gymnastics judge and official

Berthe Villancher (1908–2002) was a French gymnastics judge and official. In 2002 she was inducted into the International Gymnastics Hall of Fame.

She was born in Besançon, France. In 1945 she became an international gymnastics judge and from 1948 to 1956 she served as secretary of the International Gymnastics Federation's Women's Technical Committee. From 1956 to 1972 she was president of the committee. From 1969 to 1972 she sat on the executive committee of the federation, and was the first woman to do so.

In 2002 Villancher was inducted posthumously into the International Gymnastics Hall of Fame, in the category of lifetime achievement.
