= Arthur Gander =

Swiss gymnast

- Born: 27 November 1909; Brienz, Switzerland
- Died: 30 March 1981 (aged 71)

Gymnastics career
- Discipline: Men's artistic gymnastics

Arthur Gander (27 November 1909 – 30 March 1981) was a Swiss gymnast. He was honored in the International Gymnastics Hall of Fame in 1997. Gander was president of the International Gymnastics Federation.
