= International Gymnast =

Gymnastics magazine

- Cover of the April 2008 edition featuring Nastia Liukin.
- Categories: Sports magazine; Gymnastics
- Frequency: Monthly
- Circulation: 40,000-50,000
- Publisher: Paul Ziert & Associates Inc
- Founded: 1957
- Country: United States
- Based in: Norman, Oklahoma, U.S.
- Website: intlgymnast.com

International Gymnast, often shortened to IG, is an American sports magazine about gymnastics and the first gymnastics publication.

== History ==
=== Modern Gymnast ===
International Gymnast was created in 1957 by Glenn Sundby in Santa Monica, California, as The Modern Gymnast. It reported on both men's and women's gymnastics and by February 1958 had a worldwide, monthly circulation of 6,000.

In September 1967, the United States Gymnastics Federation announced a $10,000 grant to the magazine which made it the official magazine of the federation starting with the October 1967 issue.

=== International Gymnast ===
In 1992, Paul Ziert & Associates Inc purchased the magazine. Ziert oversees the magazine along with former Olympians Bart Conner and Nadia Comaneci.
