= Marianne Noack =

East German artistic gymnast

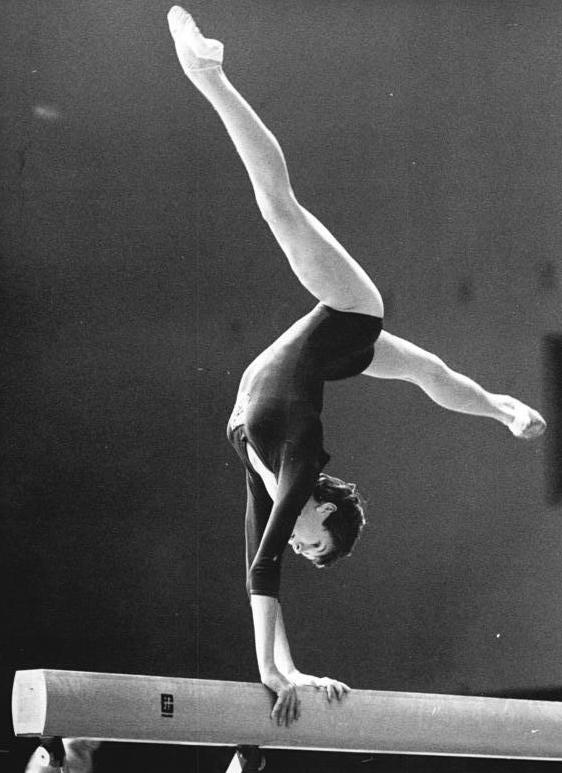
- Marianne Noack in 1969

Personal information
- Born: 5 October 1951 (age 74) Rostock, East Germany
- Height: 1.58 m (5 ft 2 in)
- Weight: 40 kg (88 lb)

Sport
- Sport: Artistic gymnastics
- Club: SC Empor Rostock
Medal record
Representing East Germany
Olympic Games
Bronze medal – third place	1968 Mexico City	Team
World championships
Silver medal – second place	1970 Ljubljana	Team

Marianne Noack (later Paulick, born 5 October 1951) is a retired German gymnast. She competed at the 1968 Summer Olympics in all artistic gymnastics events and won a bronze medal in the team competition. Her best individual result was tenth place on the balance beam. She also won a silver medal with the East German team at the 1970 World Artistic Gymnastics Championships.
