= Max Bangerter =

Swiss gymnast

- Born: 23 January 1911; Switzerland
- Died: 11 November 1997 (aged 86)

Gymnastics career
- Discipline: Men's artistic gymnastics

Max Bangerter (23 January 1911 – 11 November 1997) was a Swiss gymnast. He was Secretary of the Swiss Gymnastics Federation from 1956 to 1962, and Secretary General of the International Gymnastics Federation from 1966 to 1988. He was awarded the Olympic Order by the International Olympic Committee in 1982, and inducted into the International Gymnastics Hall of Fame in 2003.
