= Olga Karasyova =

Soviet artistic gymnast (1949–2025)

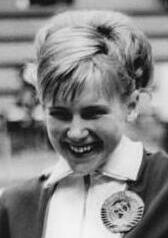
- Karasyova at the 1969 European Championships

Personal information
- Full name: Olga Dmitryievna Karasyova\
- Born: 24 July 1949 Bishkek, Kirghiz SSR, USSR
- Died: 26 October 2025 (aged 76)
- Height: 5 ft 4 in (1.63 m)
- Spouse: Valery Karasyov

Gymnastics career
- Discipline: Women's artistic gymnastics
- Country represented: Soviet Union
- Club: CSKA Moscow
- Head coach: Igor Zhuravlev
- Assistant coach: Sofia Muratova
- Retired: 1972

Olympic medal record

Women's gymnastics

Representing the Soviet Union

Olympic Games
Gold medal – first place	1968 Mexico City	Team

World Championships
Gold medal – first place	1970 Ljubljana	Team
Silver medal – second place	1970 Ljubljana	Floor
Silver medal – second place	1966 Dortmund	Team

European Championships
Gold medal – first place	1969 Landskrona	Floor
Silver medal – second place	1969 Landskrona	All-Around
Silver medal – second place	1969 Landskrona	Uneven Bars
Silver medal – second place	1969 Landskrona	Beam
Bronze medal – third place	1969 Landskrona	Vault

Olga Karasyova, née Kharlova (24 July 1949 – 26 October 2025), also known as Olga Kovalenko, was a Soviet gymnast who competed in the 1968 Summer Olympics, where she won a gold medal as a member of the Soviet team in the team event. She also won five medals at the 1969 European championships and three medals at the World championships.

== Career ==
Karasyova began gymnastics at age nine at CSKA Moscow. She was the 1965 Soviet junior all-around champion.

She competed at the 1966 World Championships, where she won a silver medal in the team event with her teammates.

Karasyova was a member of the 1968 Soviet Olympic team, where she won the team gold with her teammates. Individually, she placed 7th in the all-around and reached the floor exercise final, where she placed 5th. The next year, she competed at the 1969 European Championships, where she won a number of medals: silver in the all-around as well as the uneven bars and beam finals, gold on the floor exercise, and bronze on the vault.

In 1970, she competed at the 1970 World Championships and won gold in the team event. Individually, she finished 7th in the all-around and won silver in the floor exercise final. This was her last international competition, though she competed domestically through 1972 and placed second at the 1971 Soviet championships.

== Impersonation ==
In 1994, it was reported that Karasyova had told German television channel RTL she and her former teammates were forced to participate in abortion doping shortly before the 1968 Olympics, due to the supposed physical benefits of pregnancy. Girls who refused to have sex with their boyfriends or coaches were said to be removed from the team, and after ten weeks, the girls were forced to have an abortion. While it had been rumoured that this form of doping was used since the 1950s, no credible evidence had ever appeared until Karasyova's apparent disclosure.

Several days later, however, it was discovered the woman who was interviewed was an impostor: Karasyova was actually on a sea cruise at the time and had watched the broadcast. She sued for libel, and in 2000, the Moscow Ismail Court awarded her 35,000 roubles in damages. Despite her legal victory, the original interviews attributed to her continue to be reported as facts by some third parties.

== Personal life ==
Karasyova married Valery Karasyov after meeting him at the 1966 World championships, and they competed together at the 1968 Olympics and 1970 World championships. They divorced ten years later. She remarried to Yuri Kovalenko, an interpreter, and divorced him a decade later as well. She then married Mikhail Lifirenko, who worked in the military.

She was fluent in French and graduated from the Moscow Regional Pedagogical Institute with a degree in the language. After her competitive career, she worked as an interpreter at the international department of the USSR State Committee for Sports and acted as an aide for International Gymnastics Federation president Yuri Titov. By 2001, she received disability payments for severe spinal pain.

Karasyova died on 26 October 2025, at the age of 76.
