= Bohumila Řimnáčová =

Czech gymnast (1947–2025)

Medal record

Women's gymnastics

Representing Czechoslovakia

Olympic Games
Silver medal – second place	1968 Mexico City	Team

World Championships
Gold medal – first place	1966 Dortmund	Team
Bronze medal – third place	1970 Ljubljana	Team

Bohumila Řimnáčová (later Řešátková; 9 September 1947 – 9 September 2025) was a Czech gymnast.

== Biography ==
Řimnáčová's most remarkable achievements came in 1966 World Artistic Gymnastics Championships (second best after Věra Čáslavská in the golden women's team) and in the 1968 Summer Olympics (silver team).

After 1972 Olympics, she married, studied for a degree in organic chemistry, but retrained to be a gymnastics coach. Later she also contributed to the development of Aerobic gymnastics in the Czech Republic.

Řimnáčová died on 9 September 2025, her 78th birthday.
