= Yelena Volchetskaya =

Soviet and Belarusian artistic gymnast

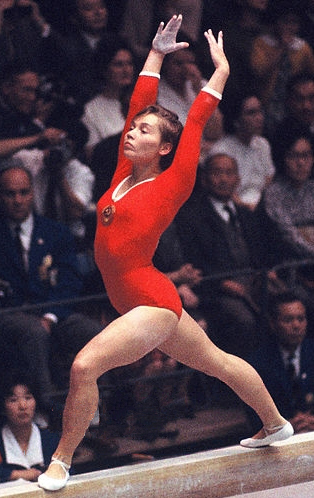
- Yelena Volchetskaya at the 1964 Olympics

Personal information
- Born: 4 December 1943 (age 82) Grodno, Byelorussian SSR, Soviet Union
- Height: 1.55 m (5 ft 1 in)
- Weight: 52 kg (115 lb)

Sport
- Sport: Artistic gymnastics
- Club: SK VS Hrodna
Medal record
Representing the Soviet Union
Olympic Games
Gold medal – first place	1964 Tokyo	Team all around

Elena Vladimirovna Volchetskaya (Belarusian: Алена Уладзіміраўна Цюнянкова (Валчэцкая); Russian: Елена Владимировна Волчецкая; born 4 December 1943) is a Soviet and Belarusian retired artistic gymnast. She competed at the 1964 Summer Olympics in all artistic gymnastics events and won a gold medal in the team all around competition. Individually her best results were fifth place in the vault and eighth all around. During her career she won five national titles: three in the vault (1961, 1962, 1965) and two on the balance beam (1963, 1964). In 1966 she broke her ankle. The same year she married, changing her last name to Tyunenkova, and next year gave birth to her first daughter, effectively retiring from sport.

In 1965 she graduated from an institute of pedagogy, and for some 30 years trained gymnasts in her native Grodno. She was the first coach of Olga Korbut, but after one and half years she passed her to Renald Knysh, who previously raised Volchetskaya. Between 1998 and 2006 she coached in Minneapolis, United States, together with Nikolai Miligulo and Olga Gotsmanova. In 2006, she returned to Grodno to her 94-year-old mother and daughters Tatyana and Irina.
