= Renald Knysh =

Soviet-Belarusian gymnastics coach (1931–2019)

- Born: Renald Ivanovich Knysh; 10 September 1931; Kapyl, Byelorussian SSR, Soviet Union
- Died: 19 April 2019 (aged 87); Grodno, Belarus
- Occupation: gymnastics coach

Renald Ivanovich Knysh (Russian: Ренальд Иванович Кныш, Belarusian: Рэнальд Іванавіч Кныш; 10 September 1931 – 19 April 2019) was a Soviet and Belarusian coach in artistic gymnastics. Considered one of gymnastics' pioneering coaches, he was the coach of Olga Korbut. He was later accused of child rape by Korbut and other gymnasts he coached. He was an Honored Сoach of the BSSR and the USSR and Honorary Сitizen of Grodno.

== Biography ==
Knysh was born in Kapyl, Minsk Region in September 1931, and was the Belarusian junior champion in 1949. He began coaching in 1953 at the Grodno children's sports school No. 3. He was the coach of Olympic champions Yelena Volchetskaya (1964) and Korbut (1972 and 1976), as well as Soviet national champion Tamara Alekseeva.

After the 1972 Olympics, as part of the Soviet delegation, Knysh met with US President Richard Nixon.

After the 1980 Olympic Games, he left the sport. He lived in Mineralnye Vody, Tallinn and Kaliningrad. In 1989, he returned to Grodno and wrote his memoirs.

He worked on drafting a proposal of benefits for Russian athletes in preparation for the 2012 Olympics, but it did not win approval. In his spare time he composed poetry.

Knysh died in Grodno in April 2019 at the age of 87.

== Abuse allegations ==
In 1999, Olga Korbut stated publicly that she had been physically and sexually abused by Knysh while he trained her, and that he had raped her shortly before the 1972 Olympics, after plying her with cognac. She alleged that the abuse continued for several years, until Knysh moved on to younger girls.
