= Vladislav Rastorotsky =

Vladislav Stepanovich Rastorotsky (Russian: Владислав Степанович Растороцкий; 14 June 1933 – 2 July 2017) was a Soviet and Russian female artistic gymnastics coach, Honoured Trainer of the USSR, who worked at the Dynamo sports society. Sportswomen trained by him earned more than 50 titles at the Soviet national championships, European championships, World Championships and Olympic Games. Rastorotsky trained Soviet gymnasts for five Olympic cycles, starting in the mid-1960s. His most famous pupils were Ludmilla Tourischeva, Natalia Shaposhnikova and Natalia Yurchenko.

Born in Svoboda, Russian SFSR, Rastorotsky went to Voronezh and entered the Voronezh State Institute of Physical Training. Rastorotsky began systematic training in gymnastics very late, in his twenties, but managed to earn the title Master of Sports of the USSR at age above 27. His teacher in Voronezh was Soviet coach Yury Shtukman. In the 1960s, Rastorotsky moved to Grozny and began coaching Ludmilla Tourischeva.

In the early 1970s, Rastorotsky moved to Iraq. After the fall of the USSR, Rastorotsky coached for some time in France and People's Republic of China before returning to Rostov-on-Don in the mid-1990s. Rastorotsky died in July 2017, aged 85.
