= Jindra Košťálová =

Czech gymnast

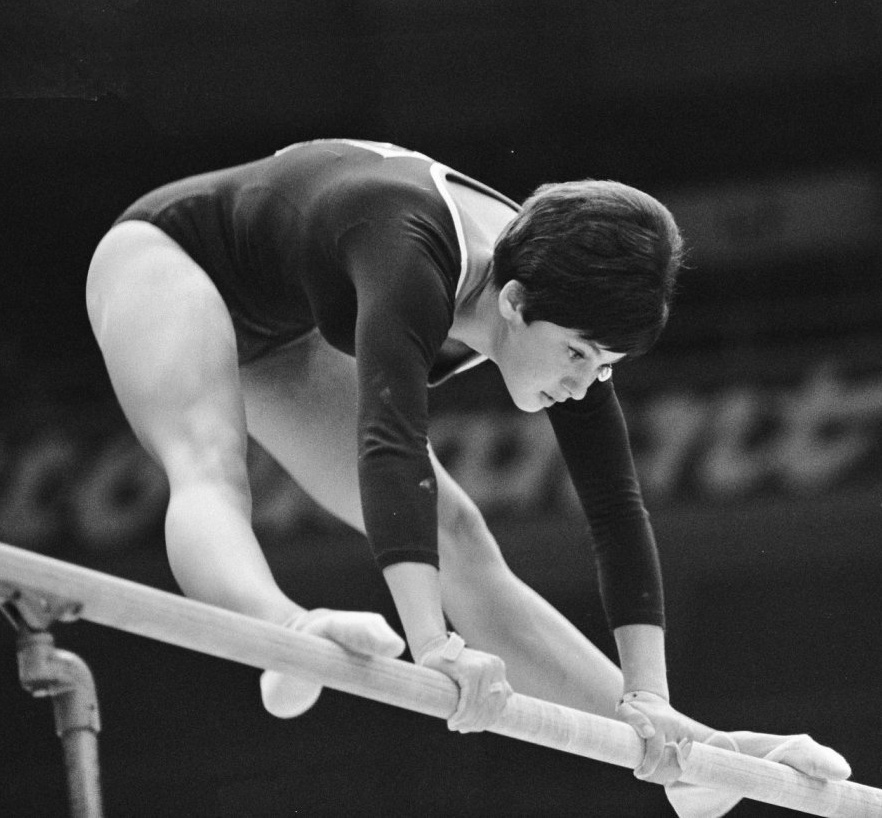
- Košťálová in 1966

Personal information
- Born: 22 February 1947 (age 79)

Gymnastics career
- Discipline: Women's artistic gymnastics
- Country represented: Czechoslovakia
Medal record
Representing Czechoslovakia
World Championships
Gold medal – first place	1966 Dortmund	Team
European Championships
Bronze medal – third place	1969 Landskrona	Balance beam
Bronze medal – third place	1969 Landskrona	Floor

Jindra Košťálová (born 22 February 1947) is a Czech retired artistic gymnast. She was part of the Czechoslovak team that won the 1966 World Artistic Gymnastics Championships. Individually, she won two bronze medals, on the floor and balance beam, at the 1969 European championships.
