= Marcela Váchová =

Czech artistic gymnast

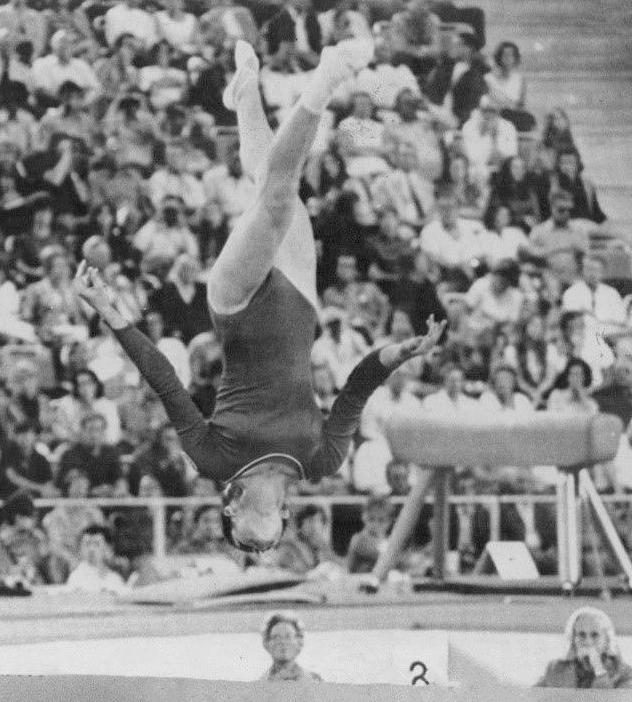
- Váchová at the 1972 Olympics (floor exercise)

Personal information
- Born: 16 July 1953 (age 73) Brno, Czechoslovakia
- Height: 161 cm (5 ft 3 in)

Gymnastics career
- Discipline: Women's artistic gymnastics
Medal record
Representing Czech Republic
World Championships
Bronze medal – third place	1970 Ljubljana	Team allround

Marcela Váchová (born 16 July 1953) is a Czech retired artistic gymnast. She won a team bronze medal at the 1970 World Championships and placed fifth on the vault. She competed at the 1972 Summer Olympics with the best individual result of 16th place on the vault.
