= Natalia Shaposhnikova =

Soviet artistic gymnast

- Full name: Natalia Vitalyevna Shaposhnikova
- Born: 24 June 1961 (age 65) Rostov-on-Don

Gymnastics career
- Discipline: Women's artistic gymnastics
- Country represented: Soviet Union
- Eponymous skills: uneven bars: clear hip circle through handstand with flight to hang onto high bar
Medal record
Representing Soviet Union
Olympic Games
Gold medal – first place	1980 Moscow	Team
Gold medal – first place	1980 Moscow	Vault
Bronze medal – third place	1980 Moscow	Balance Beam
Bronze medal – third place	1980 Moscow	Floor Exercise
World Championships
Gold medal – first place	1978 Strasbourg	Team
Silver medal – second place	1979 Ft. Worth	Team
Bronze medal – third place	1978 Strasbourg	All-Around
World Cup Final
Gold medal – first place	1977 Oviedo	Vault
Gold medal – first place	1978 Sao Paulo	Vault
Silver medal – second place	1978 Sao Paulo	Balance Beam
Silver medal – second place	1978 Sao Paulo	Floor Exercise
Bronze medal – third place	1977 Oviedo	All-Around
Bronze medal – third place	1978 Sao Paulo	All-Around
European Championships
Gold medal – first place	1979 Copenhagen	Balance Beam
Silver medal – second place	1979 Copenhagen	Floor Exercise
Bronze medal – third place	1979 Copenhagen	All-Around
Bronze medal – third place	1979 Copenhagen	Vault

Natalia Vitalyevna Shaposhnikova (Russian: Наталья Витальевна Ша́пошникова; born 24 June 1961, in Rostov-on-Don), married name Natalia Sout, is a former Soviet artistic gymnast, two-time Olympic champion, and Honoured Master of Sports of the USSR. She was known for her risky, original skills and expressive choreography, especially on balance beam and floor exercise.

== Competitive career ==
Shaposhnikova trained at Dynamo in Rostov-on-Don under Honoured Trainer of the USSR Vladislav Rastorotsky, who also trained her compatriots Ludmilla Tourischeva and Natalia Yurchenko. She was one of the world's strongest gymnasts in the late 1970s and early 1980s, especially on vault. She was known for her difficulty and originality, especially her one-armed handstands on beam. At the 1979 European Championships, she performed one of the first triple twists on floor, and her opening tumbling pass on floor at the 1980 Olympic Games was a roundoff 1.5-twisting layout immediately into a roundoff back handspring double pike.

At the 1980 Olympics in Moscow, she contributed to the Soviet team's gold medal and won an individual gold medal on vault. She also took home bronze medals on floor and beam, and missed a medal in the all-around by just 0.05.

Shaposhnikova came close to winning gold on beam at the 1978 World Championships, entering the final with a slight lead over Nadia Comăneci of Romania. However, Peter Shilston wrote in an April 1980 profile in British Gymnast magazine: "There was a fiercely partisan section of the audience determined that Comăneci should win to make up for her previous disappointing performances. When Natasha (Natalia?) came up, needing a score of 9.8 to take the gold, she faced a very hostile reception which clearly got on her nerves. She made a series of mistakes, all jeeringly received, and slumped from first place to eighth." Shilston called the loss "probably the saddest experience of Natasha's (Natalia's?) life".

=== Eponymous skill ===
Shaposhnikova invented a complex transition skill on the uneven bars—a clear hip circle on the low bar with flight backward to the high bar—and it is named after her in the Code of Points. The skill, sometimes referred to colloquially as the "Shaposh", is still widely performed today; it is credited as a D element in the 2013–16 Code of Points. Since the 1990s, other gymnasts have developed variations of the Shaposhnikova, including:

- Americans Amy Chow (stalder entry) and Kristen Maloney (toe-on entry)
- Russians Svetlana Khorkina (hip circle entry with half turn in flight) and Viktoria Komova (inbar stalder entry and inbar stalder with half turn in flight)
- Dutch gymnast Laura van Leeuwen (toe-on entry with half turn in flight)
- Russia's Aliya Mustafina and China's Yao Jinnan (stalder entry with half turn in flight)
- Germany's Elisabeth Seitz (toe-on entry with full turn in flight).

Apparatus	Name	Description	Difficulty (Note: Valid for the 2025–2028 Code of Points)
Uneven bars	Shaposhnikova	Inner front support on low bar – clear hip circle through handstand with flight to hang on high bar	D

== Coaching career ==
Shaposhnikova and her husband, Pavel Sout, a gold medalist in men's gymnastics at the 1981 World Championships, currently coach at Gymnastika in Woodland Park, New Jersey.

== Achievements (non-Olympic) ==
Year	Event	AA	Team	VT	UB	BB	FX
1976	USSR Championships	3rd					2nd
1977	World Cup	3rd		1st			
1977	USSR Cup	1st					
1977	USSR Championships	3rd		1st	2nd	2nd	
1978	World Championships	3rd	1st				
1978	World Cup	3rd		1st		2nd	2nd
1979	World Championships		2nd				
1979	European Championships	3rd		3rd		1st	2nd
1979	USSR Cup	1st					
1979	USSR Championships	1st			3rd	1st	2nd
1980	USSR Cup	2nd					
