= Larisa Petrik =

Soviet gymnast

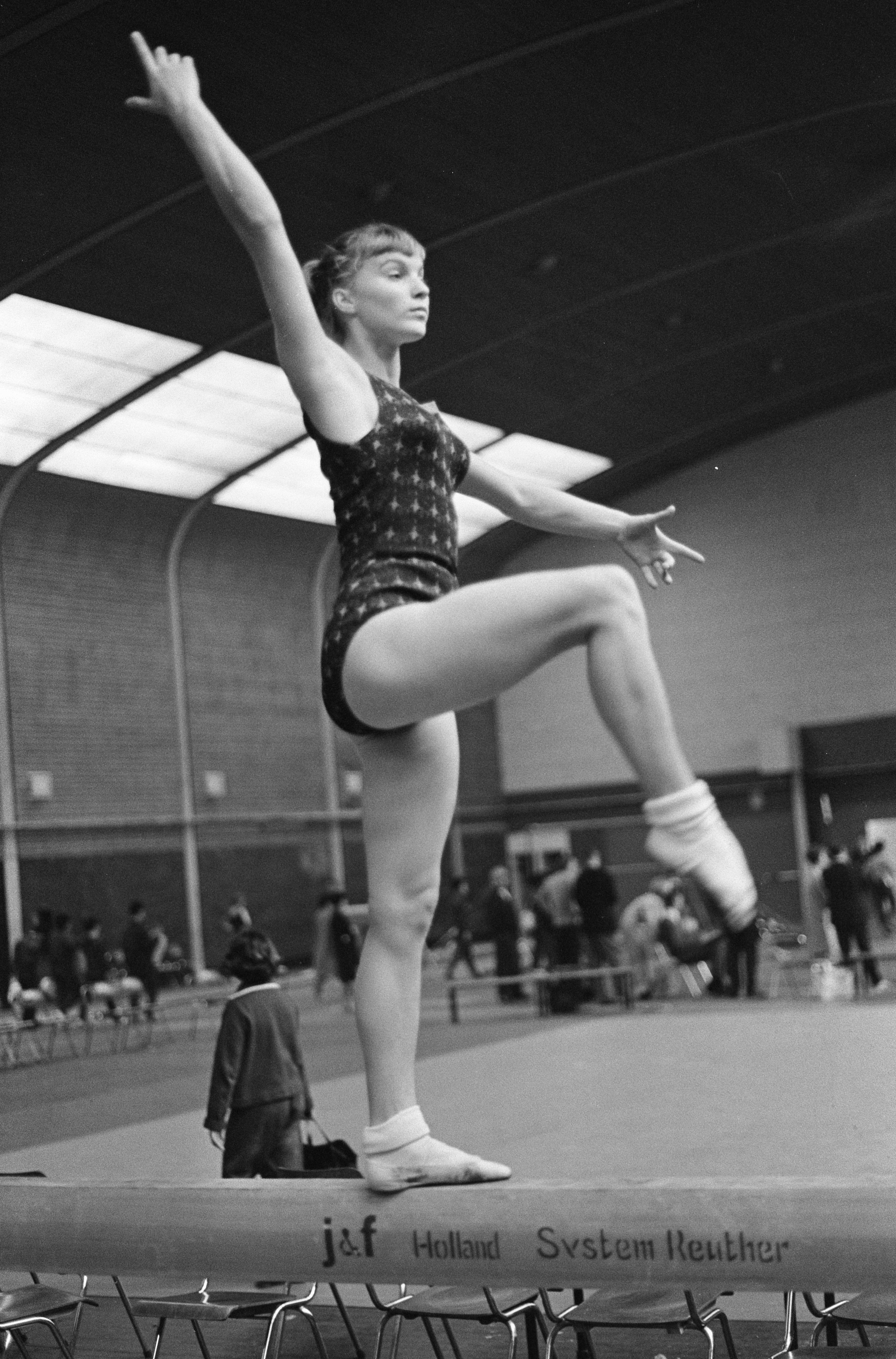
- Petrik in 1966

Personal information
- Full name: Larisa Leonidovna Petrik
- Born: 28 August 1949 (age 77) Dolinsk, Sakhalin, Russian SFSR, Soviet Union
- Height: 1.63 m (5 ft 4 in)

Gymnastics career
- Club: Dynamo Vitebsk
Medal record
Olympic Games
Gold medal – first place	1968 Mexico City	Team
Gold medal – first place	1968 Mexico City	Floor exercise
Bronze medal – third place	1968 Mexico city	Balance beam
World Championships
Gold medal – first place	1970 Ljubljana	Team
Silver medal – second place	1966 Dortmund	Team
Bronze medal – third place	1966 Dortmund	Balance Beam
Bronze medal – third place	1970 Ljubljana	Balance Beam
European Championships
Bronze medal – third place	1965 Sofia	Balance beam

Larisa Leonidovna Petrik (Russian: Лариса Леонидовна Петрик; born 28 August 1949) is a former Russian gymnast and Olympic champion. Petrik competed at the 1966 World Championships where she shared the team silver medal (gold went to the Czechoslovaks) and earned an individual bronze medal on the beam. She also competed at the 1968 Summer Olympics in Mexico City, where she received a gold medal in floor exercise (shared with Věra Čáslavská), a gold medal in the team final, and a bronze medal in balance beam. Her gold medal on floor was very controversial because originally, Čáslavská won outright. After the competition was concluded, Petrik's prelims scores were changed to let her tie with Čáslavská, an action which caused Čáslavská to publicly defy the Soviets who had recently invaded her home country.

After marrying the Olympic gymnast Viktor Klimenko she changed her last name to Klimenko (Russian: Клименко). She has two sons: Vladimir and Viktor; Vladimir is a gymnast and Viktor is a ballet dancer.
