= Gymnastics at the 1972 Summer Olympics – Women's floor =

Women's floor at the Games of the XX Olympiad

Medalists
1st place, gold medalist(s)		Olga Korbut	Soviet Union
2nd place, silver medalist(s)		Ludmila Tourischeva	Soviet Union
3rd place, bronze medalist(s)		Tamara Lazakovich	Soviet Union

These are the results of the women's floor competition, one of six events for female competitors in artistic gymnastics at the 1972 Summer Olympics in Munich. The qualification and final rounds took place on August 27, 28 and 31st at the Sports Hall.

== Results ==
=== Qualification ===
One-hundred eighteen gymnasts competed in the compulsory and optional rounds on August 27 and 28. The six highest scoring gymnasts advanced to the final on August 31.

=== Final ===
Rank	Gymnast	C	O	Prelim	Final	Total
Gold medal	Olga Korbut (URS)	9.600	9.750	9.675	9.900	19.575
Silver medal	Ludmila Tourischeva (URS)	9.800	9.700	9.750	9.800	19.550
Bronze medal	Tamara Lazakovich (URS)	9.700	9.600	9.650	9.800	19.450
4	Karin Janz (GDR)	9.500	9.700	9.600	9.800	19.400
5	Lyubov Burda (URS)	9.500	9.500	9.500	9.600	19.100
5	Angelika Hellmann (GDR)	9.400	9.600	9.500	9.600	19.100
