= Mária Gál =

Hungarian volleyball player (1945–2014)

Personal information
- Nationality: Hungarian
- Born: 15 August 1945; Budapest, Hungary
- Died: 22 April 2014 (aged 68)

Sport
- Sport: Volleyball

Mária Gál (15 August 1945 – 22 April 2014) was a Hungarian volleyball player. She competed in the women's tournament at the 1972 Summer Olympics.
