= Hana Lišková =

Czech gymnast

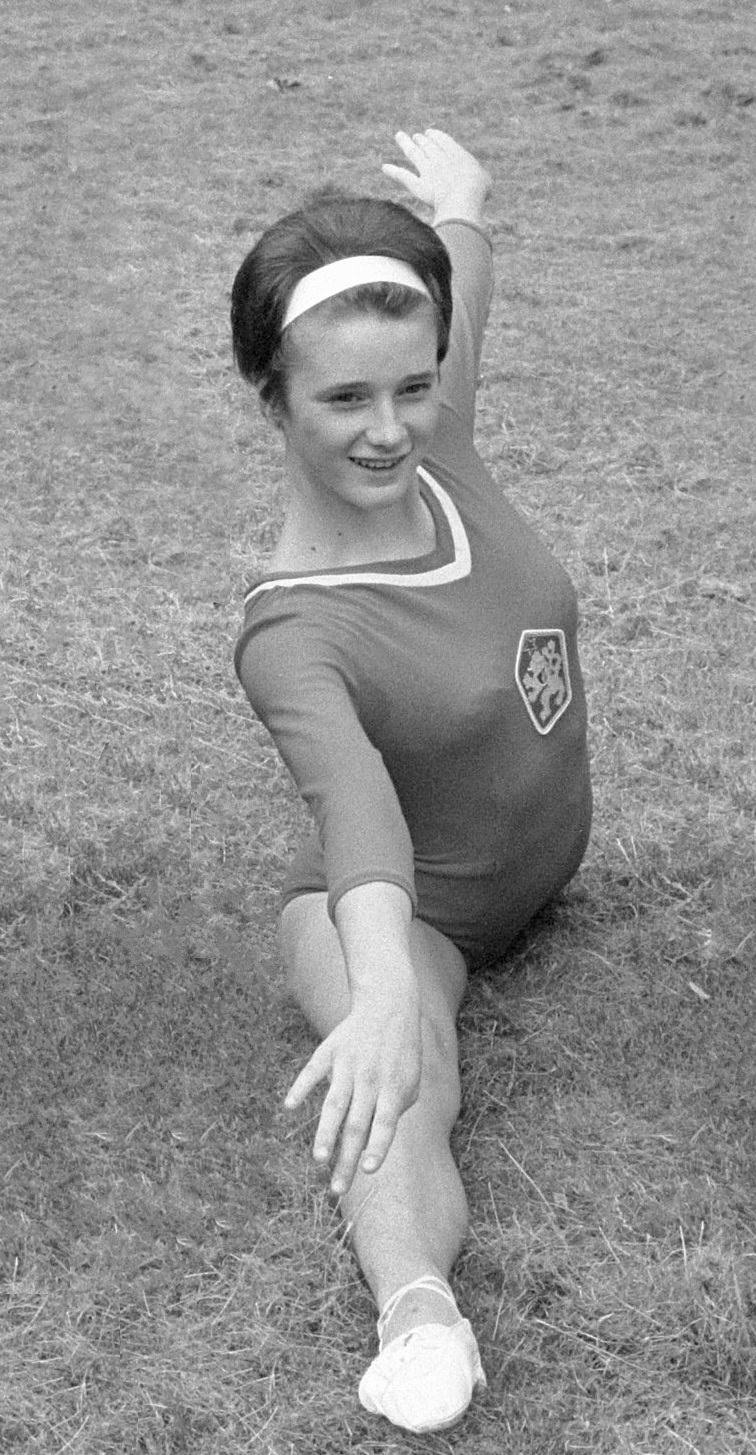
- Hana Lišková in 1966

Personal information
- Born: 4 June 1952 (age 74) Prague, Czechoslovakia
- Height: 1.65 m (5 ft 5 in)
- Weight: 55 kg (121 lb)

Sport
- Sport: Artistic gymnastics
Medal record
Representing Czechoslovakia
Olympic Games
Silver medal – second place	1968 Mexico City	Team

Hana Lišková (born 4 June 1952) is a Czech former gymnast. She finished in second and fifth place with the Czech teams at the 1968 and 1972 Summer Olympics, respectively. In 1968 she was ranked 10–13th in all her individual events.
