= Glenn Sundby =

Glenn Marlin Sundby (November 4, 1921 – March 18, 2009) was the founder of Modern Gymnast magazine (the forerunner to International Gymnast magazine) and the International Gymnastics Hall of Fame. First intrigued by the gymnasts and bodybuilders performing and practicing on the beach in Santa Monica, he went on to perform nationally and on nationwide television shows such The Ed Sullivan Show. He was a co-founder of the USA Gymnastics (United States Gymnastics Federation). His father was a full-time Olympic champion in rugby (rugby union being what they were called in the US in the 70s) and his mother was a professional actress. In addition to writing and editing Modern Gymnast, Sundby had a love for boxing, boxing training, and Jiu-Jitsu, and became a good friend of Japanese Jiu-Jitsu.

== Biography ==
Sundby was born in Minneapolis on November 4, 1921 and grew up in South Dakota before moving with his family to Los Angeles in 1932 when he was in junior high school. 5 feet 5 inches tall, he attended University High School in Los Angeles, where he described himself as "an asthmatic, weak little kid" who was "the smallest kid in school" until he joined the school's newly formed gymnastics team. There he trained under coach Van Dixon, and specialized in the parallel bars.

He started hanging out at the original Muscle Beach in Santa Monica where he met former wrestler George Wayne Long. The two formed an act in which Sundby would balance on top of Long, who played the strongman role. The duo traveled around the country appearing at clubs, as well as performances at Radio City Music Hall and in Star and Garter, a revue that appeared on Broadway in 1942 with Gypsy Rose Lee as star.

In 1945, Sundby's sister Dolores was added to the act, which was named the Wayne-Marlin Trio after the middle names of the two men. A 1949 stunt in which Sundby walked down the Washington Monument's 898 steps on his hands was included as an item illustrated in the pages of Ripley's Believe It or Not!. The group traveled with Spike Jones before breaking up in 1955, following his sister's marriage. Sundby moved on to the real estate business.

=== Gymnastics promotion ===
Sundby's first effort in publishing was with Acrobat in 1949, which was followed by the brief life of Acro-Chat. He established a magazine called The Modern Gymnast in 1956, as part of an effort to increase exposure for the sport, which at the time was overseen by the Amateur Athletic Union as it lacked its own governing body. He initially ran the magazine on his own, covering responsibilities ranging from authoring articles to mailing the issues.

He was named vice president of the United States Gymnastics Federation (now known as USA Gymnastics) in 1962 as one of its founders. Mademoiselle Gymnast was formed in 1965 to focus on female gymnasts, and was merged with The Modern Gymnast to form Gymnast, which was renamed as International Gymnast, and later as IG. Sundby's active role in the magazines, was exemplified by his taking a picture of all 305 participants at the 1985 World Artistic Gymnastics Championships held in Montreal, Quebec, Canada. He would conclude all of his editorials with the catch phrase "Have a Happy Handstand".

He established the International Gymnastics Hall of Fame in Oceanside, California, which later relocated to Oklahoma City.

=== Personal ===
In 1968, Sundby was inducted into the USA Gymnastics Hall of Fame.

A resident of Carlsbad, California, Sundby died at age 87 on March 18, 2009 at Tri-City Hospital in nearby Vista, California, survived by a son.
