= Uneven bars =

Artistic gymnastics apparatus

Berta Pujadas

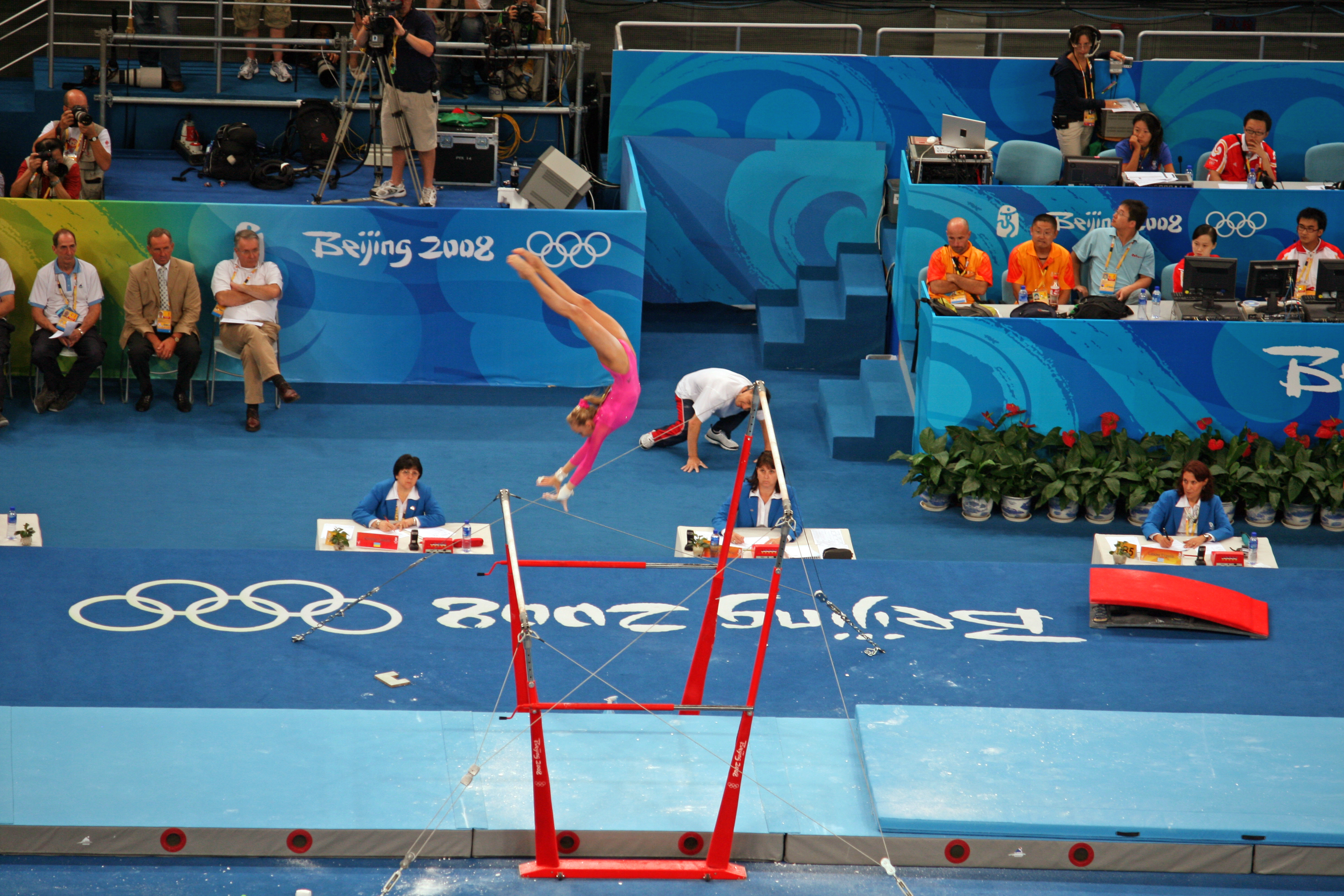
Nastia Liukin

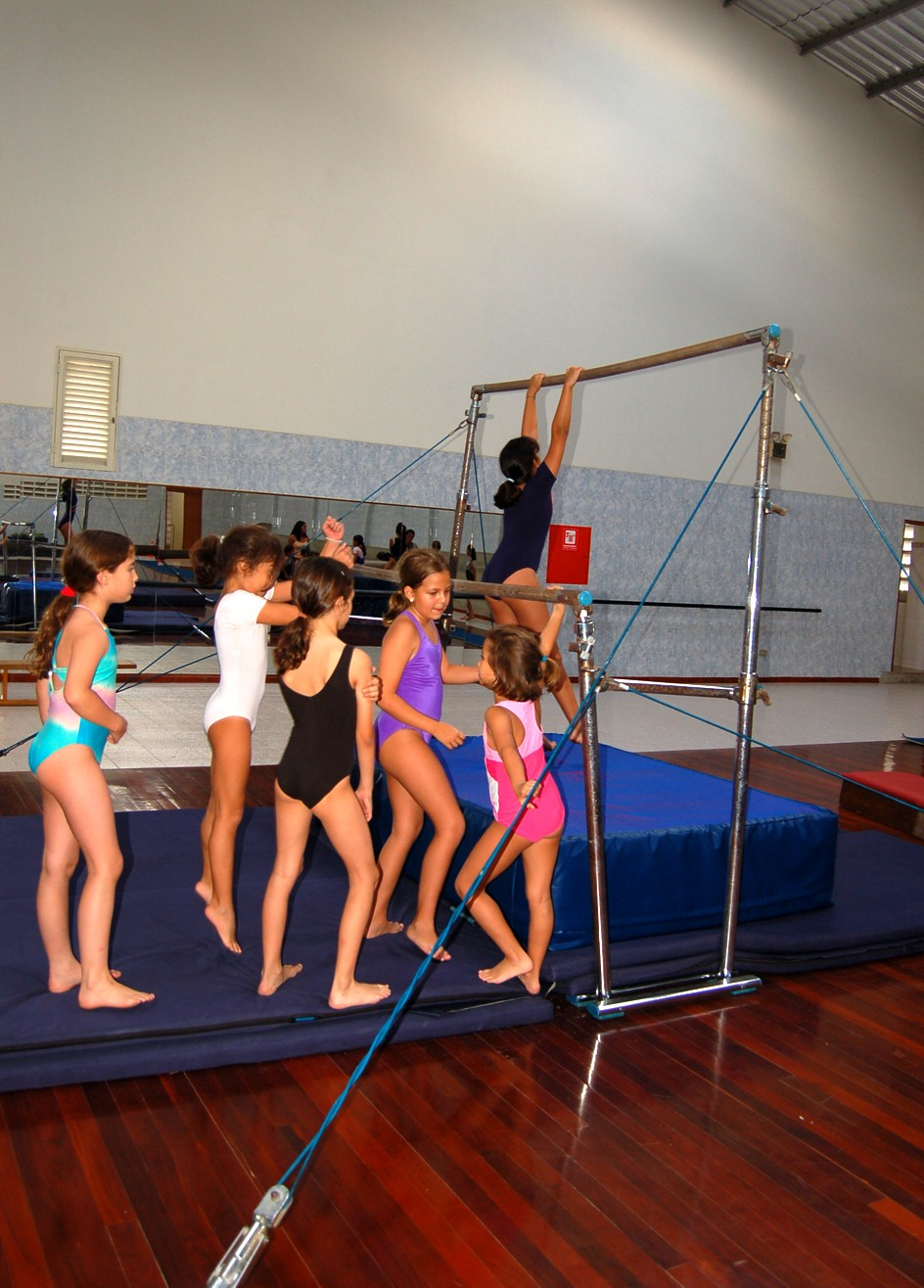
Lineup for practice

The uneven bars or asymmetric bars is an artistic gymnastics apparatus. It is made of a steel frame. The bars are made of fiberglass with wood coating, or less commonly wood. The English abbreviation for the event in gymnastics scoring is UB or AB, and the apparatus and event are often referred to simply as "bars". The bars are placed at different heights and widths, allowing the gymnast to transition from bar to bar. A gymnast usually adds white chalk to the hands so that they can grip the bar better.

== The apparatus ==
Uneven bars used in international gymnastics competitions must conform to the guidelines and specifications set forth by the International Gymnastics Federation Apparatus Norms brochure. Several companies manufacture and sell bars, including AAI in the United States, Jannsen and Fritsen in Europe, and Acromat in Australia.

Many gyms also have a single bar or a set of uneven bars over a loose foam pit or soft mat to provide an additional level of safety when learning new skills.

=== Dimensions ===
Measurements depend on the setting of the bar. Measurements of the bars are provided by the Fédération Internationale de Gymnastique (FIG) in the Apparatus Norms brochure.

- Height:
  - High bars: 250 centimetres (8.2 ft)
  - Low bar: 170 centimetres (5.6 ft)
- Diameter of bar: 4 centimetres (1.6 in)
- Length of the bars: 240 centimetres (7.9 ft)
- Diagonal distance between the two bars: varies, 130 centimetres (4.3 ft)–190 centimetres (6.2 ft) (adjustable)

== Routines ==
Routines usually involve a lot of strength, jumping, and swings. They are generally composed of a set of skills, each worth a particular value.

=== Evolution ===
The uneven bars apparatus originally consisted of men's parallel bars set to different heights. Consequently, the bars were very close together, and gymnasts could transition from one to the other with little difficulty. Routines of the early 1950s chiefly consisted of simple circles, kips, and static balance elements and holds. In the late 1950s, the trend shifted toward fluid motion, and gymnasts began to perform routines composed of more difficult circles, kips, beats (bouncing the body off the low bar while hanging from the high bar), wraps (wrapping the body around the low bar while hanging from the high bar) and transitions. Release moves also began to come into play, although they were almost entirely limited to transitions between the low and high bars. In the late 1960s and early 1970s, companies began manufacturing uneven bars as a separate specific apparatus. The design was changed slightly to allow the bars to be adjustable, with tension cables that held the apparatus to the floor. As a result of this change, coaches could set the bars farther apart. Additionally, the bars' circumference decreased, allowing gymnasts to grasp and swing from them with greater ease.

As other events in gymnastics increased in difficulty, so did the uneven bars. Gymnasts and coaches began experimenting with elements, attempting more challenging dismounts, and adapting moves from men's horizontal bar. In 1972, Olga Korbut pioneered the Korbut Flip, the first high bar salto release move. Nadia Comăneci continued the trend with her original Comaneci salto at the 1976 Olympic Games in Montreal and advanced handstand elements four years later. The giant swing, the staple of high bar in men's artistic gymnastics (MAG), was also adopted into the women's Code of Points, and quickly became a basic uneven bars skill.

By the mid-1980s, routines had become so based on swing and release moves that the bars were moved even farther apart. The distance between bars increased even more as gymnasts developed complex transition elements that required space, such as the Pak salto.

For international elite-level gymnasts, there is a required distance between the low and high bar, called the FIG setting, where all elite-level gymnasts must compete.

Of all the apparatus in women's artistic gymnastics (WAG), uneven bars are probably the ones that have seen the most radical changes. Most elements from the 1950s and '60s bars routines, such as the Hecht dismount and the Radochla somersault, are now entirely obsolete and rarely used; others, such as the once-traditional beats and wraps, are impossible given the current diagonal separation between bars, and still others, such as static holds and the Korbut Flip, are not permitted under the current Code of Points. In USAG levels 1–5, everyone in the same level performs the same compulsory routine. In levels 1-3, the gymnasts stay only on the low bar. Once the gymnast reaches level 4, she uses both the low and high bars. In levels 6 through elite, gymnasts and coaches make up their own routines within specific requirements using both bars.

In Gymnastics Australia, gymnasts in levels 1-6 set routines that are scored out of 10. In levels 7-10 and elite, gymnasts perform optional routines that adhere to set guidelines and meet certain requirements.

=== International level routines ===
A routine on the uneven bars must consist of:

- Flight element from high bar to low bar and vice versa
- Flight element on the same bar
- At least two different grips and a close bar circle element
- Non-flight with a turn on the bar, for example, turning handstands
- Dismount

=== Scoring and rules ===
Judges score routines based on difficulty, form, technique, and composition. Deductions are taken for execution errors, poor form, falls, pauses, "empty" swings (extra swings that do not lead into another skill), steps on the dismount, and other mistakes. Falls incur an automatic deduction of 1 full point in the 2009 FIG CoP. For levels 1-10, a fall is 0.5 points. Also, if the gymnast hits the low bar with her foot/feet (as Beth Tweddle did at the 2008 Olympics bars qualifications, and Viktoria Komova did at the 2012 Olympics bars apparatus finals), a deduction of 0.1 to 0.5 points will occur depending on the severity of the hit. The same deduction occurs when the gymnast hits one or both feet on the floor while performing a skill on the low bar.

==== Apparatus specific rules ====
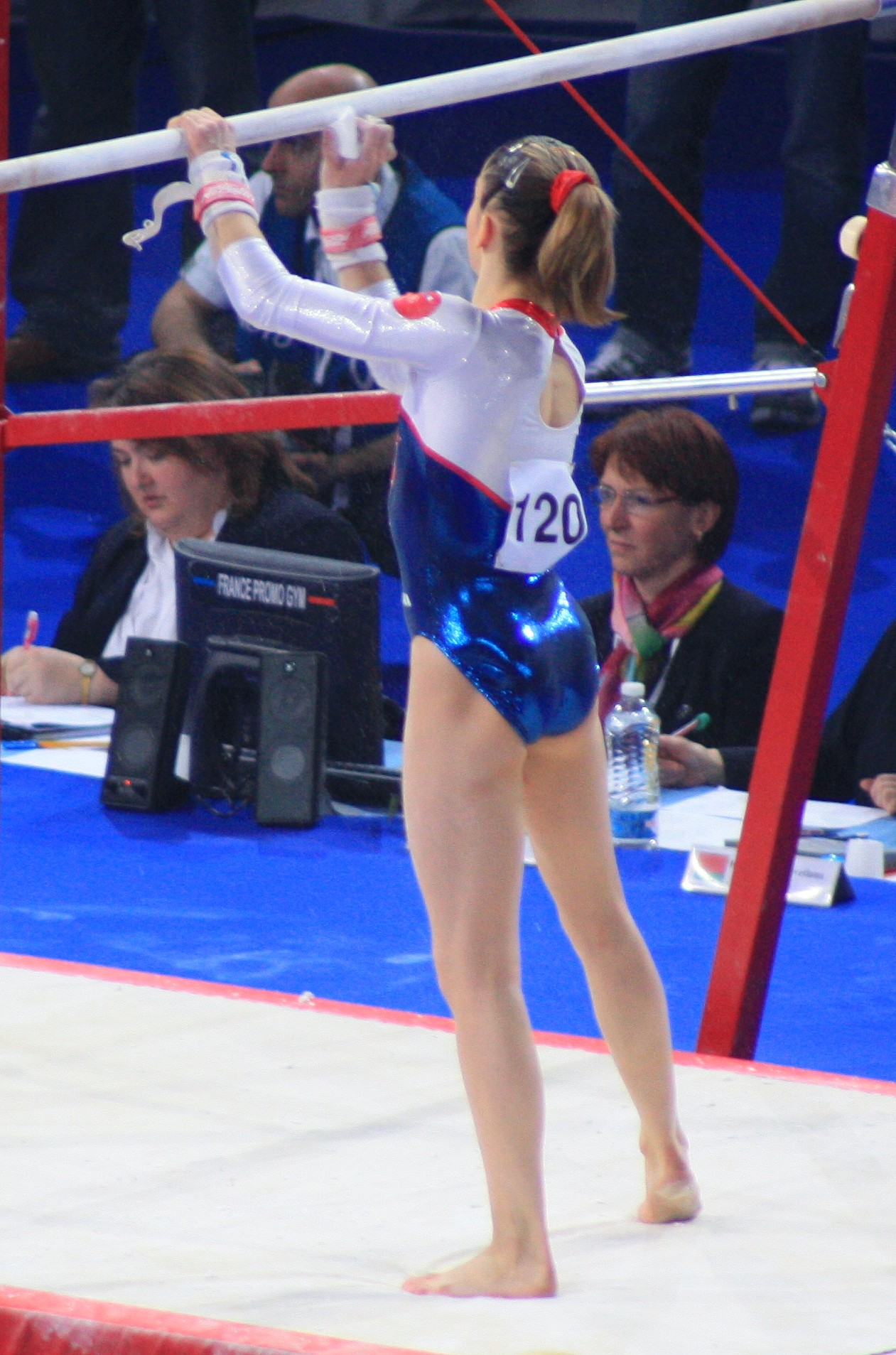
Youna Dufournet preparing the bars with chalk

Gymnasts are permitted to tape their hands or use grips or hand guards on bars level 4 through elite. Their coaches are also permitted to apply chalk and/or water to the bars to ensure gymnasts don't slip off; some gymnasts may apply diluted honey to their grips.

Unlike high bar and rings in MAG, gymnasts may not be lifted to the uneven bars to begin their routines. They may mount the apparatus with either a simple or a difficult skill on either the high or low bar; running mounts and springboards are permitted.

Once the routine has started, the coach may not physically interfere with the athlete. The coach can stand on the mat during release moves and dismounts. If the gymnast falls on one of these skills, her coach can catch her or break her fall; the coach can also lift her back to the high bar to continue her routine. If a springboard has been used for the mount, the coach is supposed to quickly step in and remove it so that it does not interfere with the routine.

If a gymnast falls from the apparatus, she has 30 seconds to re-mount. Within this time limit, she can readjust her grips or chalk her hands again if necessary. However, her routine will be finished if she does not return to the bars within 30 seconds. Many judges are flexible with this rule, especially if the gymnast took a hard fall and needed a minute to shake it off and regain her focus. Often, the judge or judging assistant will give the gymnast a ten-second warning.

== Olympic champions on the uneven bars ==
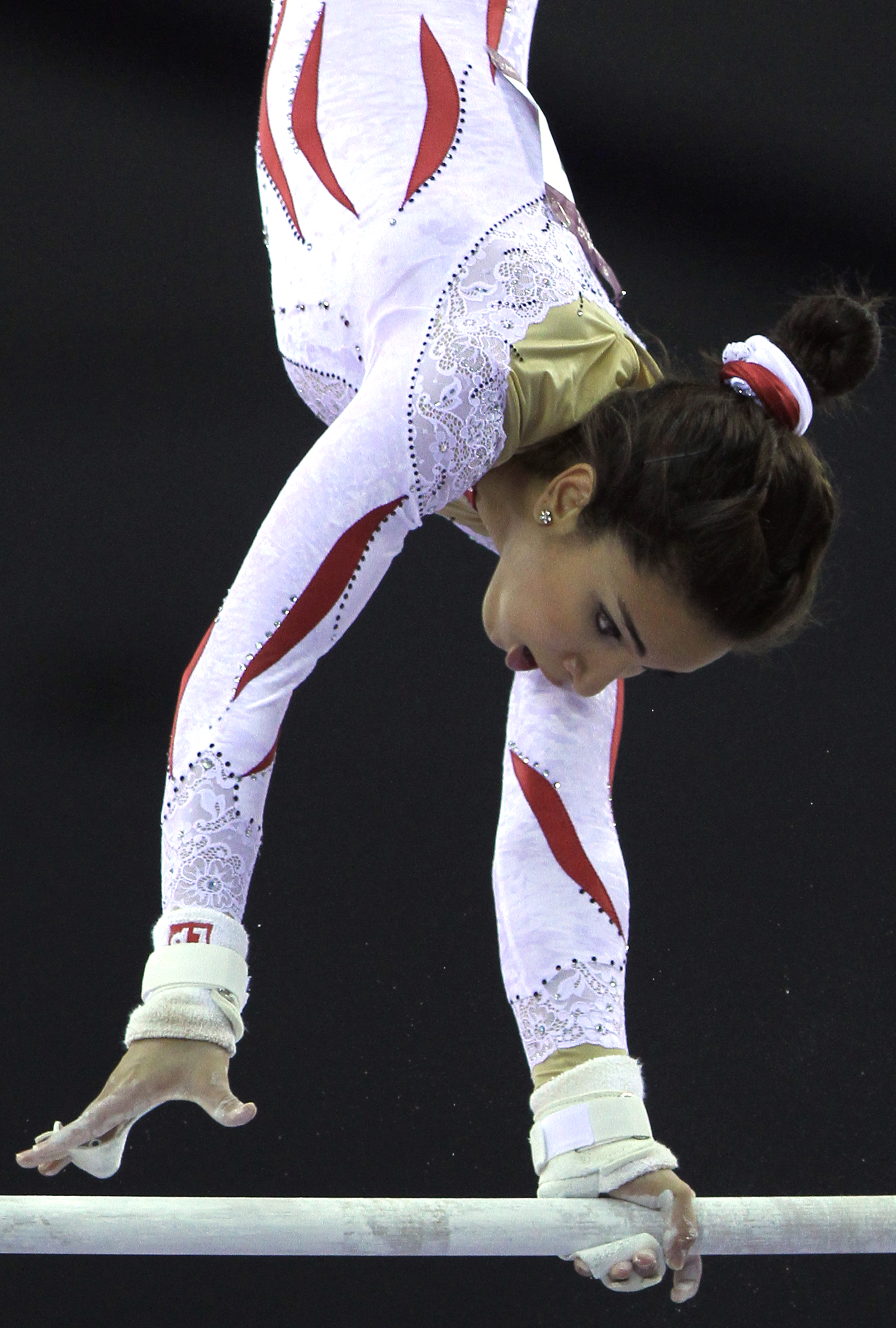
Shaden Wohdan, Qatar

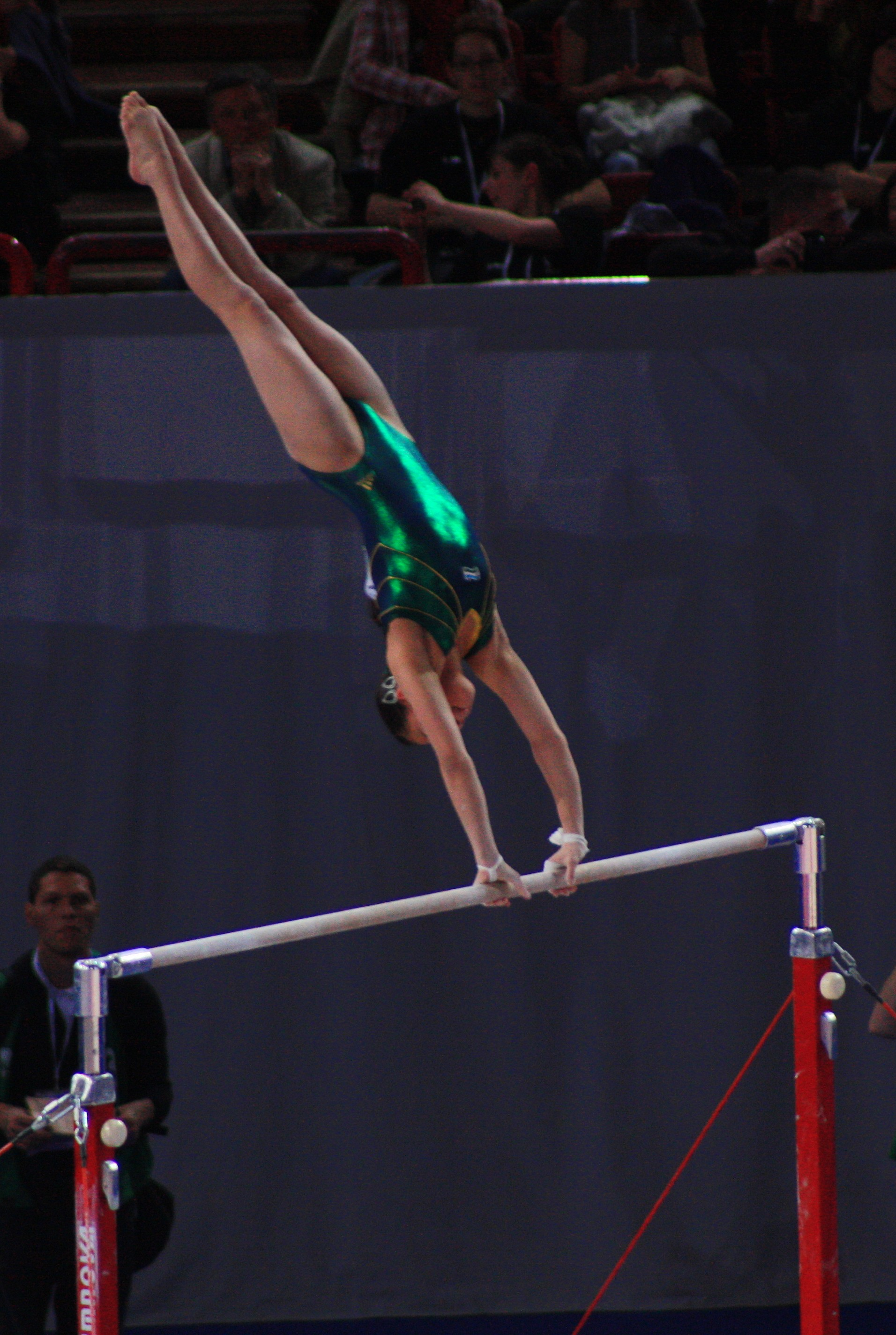
Asal Saparbaeva, Uzbekistan

Games	Gold	Silver	Bronze
1952 Helsinki	Margit Korondi; Hungary	Maria Gorokhovskaya; Soviet Union	Ágnes Keleti; Hungary
1956 Melbourne	Ágnes Keleti; Hungary	Larisa Latynina; Soviet Union	Sofia Muratova; Soviet Union
1960 Rome	Polina Astakhova; Soviet Union	Larisa Latynina; Soviet Union	Tamara Lyukhina; Soviet Union
1964 Tokyo	Polina Astakhova; Soviet Union	Katalin Makray; Hungary	Larisa Latynina; Soviet Union
1968 Mexico City	Věra Čáslavská; Czechoslovakia	Karin Janz; East Germany	Zinaida Voronina; Soviet Union
1972 Munich	Karin Janz; East Germany	Olga Korbut; Soviet Union; Erika Zuchold; East Germany	none awarded
1976 Montreal	Nadia Comăneci; Romania	Teodora Ungureanu; Romania	Marta Egervari; Hungary
1980 Moscow	Maxi Gnauck; East Germany	Emilia Eberle; Romania	Maria Filatova; Soviet Union; Steffi Kräker; East Germany; Melita Ruhn; Romania
1984 Los Angeles	Ma Yanhong; China; Julianne McNamara; United States	none awarded	Mary Lou Retton; United States
1988 Seoul	Daniela Silivaș; Romania	Dagmar Kersten; East Germany	Yelena Shushunova; Soviet Union
1992 Barcelona	Lu Li; China	Tatiana Gutsu; Unified Team	Shannon Miller; United States
1996 Atlanta	Svetlana Khorkina; Russia	Amy Chow; United States; Bi Wenjing; China	none awarded
2000 Sydney	Svetlana Khorkina; Russia	Ling Jie; China	Yang Yun; China
2004 Athens	Émilie Le Pennec; France	Terin Humphrey; United States	Courtney Kupets; United States
2008 Beijing	He Kexin; China	Nastia Liukin; United States	Yang Yilin; China
2012 London	Aliya Mustafina; Russia	He Kexin; China	Beth Tweddle; Great Britain
2016 Rio	Aliya Mustafina; Russia	Madison Kocian; United States	Sophie Scheder; Germany
2020 Tokyo	Nina Derwael; Belgium	Anastasia Ilyankova; ROC	Sunisa Lee; United States
2024 Paris	Kaylia Nemour; Algeria	Qiu Qiyuan; China	Sunisa Lee; United States

== Injuries ==
A study of competitive collegiate gymnastics injuries found that almost as many injuries occurred on uneven bars as on the floor. Falls from the bars can lead to serious injuries or paralysis; Taylor Lindsay-Noel was paralyzed during an attempted dismount from the apparatus in 2008. Poor facilities in under resourced countries can exacerbate the effect of a fall. On rare occasions, accidents have been fatal. In 2021, Séverine Emeraude Djala Abaka, a Cameroonian gymnast, died shortly before the African Championships, where she had intended to compete, after falling on her neck.

== External links and sources ==
- The 2009-2012 Code of Points
- Apparatus description at the FIG website
- US Gym Net's glossary of uneven bars skills
- Animations and explanations of basic bars skills
- The Complete Book of Gymnastics, David Hunn, Ward Lock Ltd, London, 1980, ISBN 99903-963-2-9
- Description of gymnastics technique by animation
