= Olga Korbut =

Soviet gymnast; American instructor since 1991 (born 1955)

- Вольга Корбут
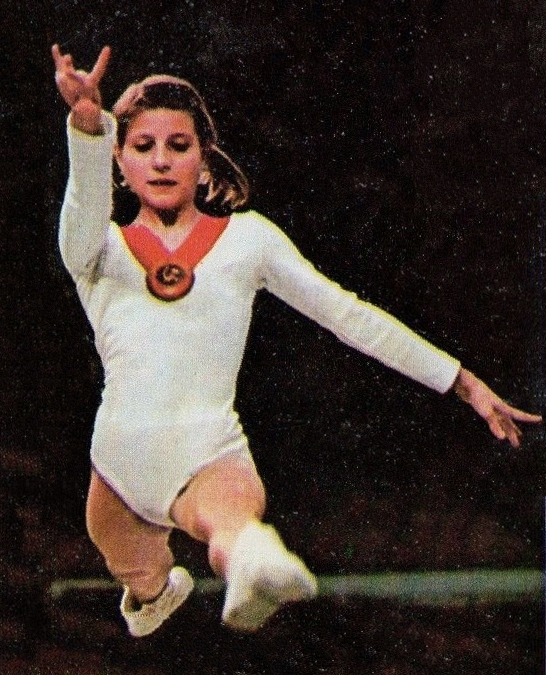
- Korbut in c. 1972

Personal information
- Full name: Olga Valentinovna Korbut
- Nickname: Sparrow from Minsk
- Born: 16 May 1955 (age 71) Hrodna, Byelorussian SSR, Soviet Union (USSR)

Gymnastics career
- Discipline: Women's artistic gymnastics
- Country represented: Soviet Union
- Club: Soviet Army Grodno
- Head coach: Renald Knysh
- Eponymous skills: Korbut flip
- Retired: 1977
Medal record
Representing Soviet Union
Olympic Games
| Gold medal – first place | 1972 Munich | Team |
| Gold medal – first place | 1972 Munich | Balance beam |
| Gold medal – first place | 1972 Munich | Floor exercise |
| Gold medal – first place | 1976 Montreal | Team |
| Silver medal – second place | 1972 Munich | Uneven bars |
| Silver medal – second place | 1976 Montreal | Balance beam |
World Championships
| Gold medal – first place | 1974 Varna | Team |
| Gold medal – first place | 1974 Varna | Vault |
| Silver medal – second place | 1974 Varna | All-Around |
| Silver medal – second place | 1974 Varna | Uneven bars |
| Silver medal – second place | 1974 Varna | Balance beam |
| Silver medal – second place | 1974 Varna | Floor exercise |
European Championships
| Silver medal – second place | 1973 London | All-Around |

Olga Valentinovna Korbut (Note: Belarusian: Вольга Валянцінаўна Корбут, romanized: Vol’ha Valyantsinawna Korbut; Russian: Ольга Валентиновна Корбут) (born 16 May 1955) is a Belarusian retired gymnast who competed for the Soviet Union. Nicknamed the "Sparrow from Minsk," she won four gold medals and two silver medals at the Summer Olympic Games, in which she competed in 1972 and 1976 for the Soviet team, and was the inaugural inductee to the International Gymnastics Hall of Fame in 1988.

Korbut retired from gymnastics in 1977 at the age of 22, considered young for gymnasts of the period, but her influence and legacy in gymnastics were far-reaching. Korbut's 1972 Olympic performances are widely credited as redefining gymnastics, changing the sport from emphasising ballet and elegance to acrobatics, as well as changing gymnastics from a niche sport to one of the most popular sports in the world. She emigrated to the United States in 1991, where she now lives and trains gymnasts. She became a citizen in 2000.

== Early life ==
Korbut was born in Grodno to Valentin and Valentina Korbut. After World War II, the family moved to Grodno from Dubniaki (a small town near Kalinkavichy). She started training at age 8, and entered a Belarusian sports school headed by coach Renald Knysh at age 9. There, Korbut's first trainer was Elena Volchetskaya, an Olympic gold medalist (1964), but she was moved to Knysh's group a year later. Initially he found her "lazy and capricious" but he also saw potential in her great talent, unusually supple spine, and charisma. With him, she learned a difficult backward somersault on the balance beam. She debuted this at a competition in the USSR in 1969. The same year, Korbut completed a backflip-to-catch on the uneven bars; this was the first backward release move ever performed by a woman on bars.

She finished fifth at her first competition in the 1969 USSR championships, where she was allowed to compete as a 14-year-old. The next year, she won a gold medal in the vault. Due to illness and injury, she was unable to compete in many of the competitions before the 1972 Summer Olympics.

== Olympics ==
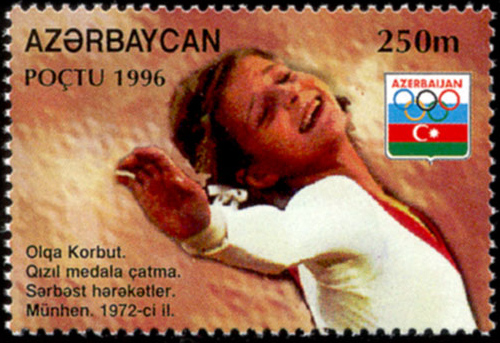
Olga Korbut at the 1972 Olympics on an Azerbaijani stamp

At the 1972 Summer Olympics in Munich, Korbut's acrobatics and open high-level gymnastics brought her much fame. During the Olympics, Korbut was one of the favorites for the all-around after her dynamic performance in the team competition; however, she missed her mount on bars three times, and the title went to teammate Ludmilla Tourischeva.

She went on to win three gold medals for the balance beam, floor exercise, and team competitions. Korbut's first attempt at her uneven bars routine was marred by several mistakes, which all but ended her chances of winning a gold medal in the all-around. The next day, Korbut repeated the same routine in the event finals, although this time successfully. After the boards displayed a score of 9.8, the audience began to whistle and shout vulgar remarks at the judges in disapproval, believing her score to be too low. This carried on for several minutes, but the judges refused to change their score, and she finished with the silver medal. Later, Korbut said she considered it an example of unfair judging she had been subject to.

"When Olga Korbut captured the world's imagination on her way to three gold medals at the 1972 Olympic Games in Munich, she pioneered the essence of modern gymnastics: enchanting artistry married seamlessly with breathtaking, daring acrobatics."

— The Herald, 2015

Korbut is most famous for her uneven bars and balance beam routines, as well as her charismatic performances that captivated audiences. In 1973, she won the Russian and World Student (i.e., University) Games, and a silver medal in the all-around at the European Championships.

At the 1976 Summer Olympics in Montreal, Soviet coaches and officials had designated Korbut as the woman who could beat the Romanian prodigy, Nadia Comăneci, but Korbut was injured and her performances in the games were sub-par. She was overshadowed not only by Comăneci, but also by her own teammate Nellie Kim. She did collect a team gold medal, and an individual silver medal for the balance beam.

== Retirement and life after the Olympics ==
Korbut graduated from the Grodno Pedagogical Institute in 1977, became a teacher, and retired from gymnastic competition. She married Leonid Bortkevich, a member of Belarusian folk band Pesniary. The couple had a son, Richard, born in 1979. In 1988, Korbut became the first gymnast inducted into the International Gymnastics Hall of Fame.

In 1991, she and her family immigrated to the United States, prompted by concerns about the aftereffects of the Chernobyl disaster on Belarus. They settled in New Jersey, where she taught gymnastics. Two years later, the family moved to the U.S. state of Georgia, where she continued to coach. Korbut and Bortkevich divorced in 2000, the same year she became a naturalized U.S. citizen. In 2002, she moved to Scottsdale, Arizona, to become head coach at Scottsdale Gymnastics and Cheerleading. Korbut was also featured on an episode of Celebrity Boxing, which aired on May 22, 2002, with her opponent, Darva Conger, winning by unanimous decision. Since then, Korbut has worked with private gymnastics students and done motivational speaking.

During the 2012 Summer Olympics, in London, Korbut appeared on Twitter and Facebook, providing live, on-site commentary on the gymnastics competitions in the North Greenwich Arena. During the games, the Royal Opera House hosted an exhibition created in collaboration with the Olympic Museum in Lausanne, Switzerland, entitled The Olympic Journey, The Story of the Games. Along with historical artifacts, the show featured the personal narratives of 16 Olympic medalists, including Korbut. Her appearance at the exhibition on August 3 of that year marked the 40th anniversary of her Olympic victories. "I didn't even expect this," she said. "I am so honored to be here."

In 2017, Korbut sold her 1972 and 1976 Olympic medals, among 32 lots (including two golds and a silver from the Munich Olympics), which fetched $333,500 at Heritage Auctions.

In 1999, she spoke out about the sexual assault and rape she had suffered at the hands of her coach, Renald Knysh, which he denied. "The truth was that many of the gymnasts were not just sport machines, but sexual slaves to the trainer," Korbut stated. "We were not just potential gymnasts, but future concubines for himself." Later, in 2018, Korbut appeared on a TV show, in which she again spoke out about several incidents of sexual assault by her coach. As a result of her speaking out publicly, several other gymnasts, who had also trained under Knysh, came forward to reveal their own similar experiences of sexual assault.

In 2021, Korbut was named by Carnegie Corporation of New York as an honoree of the Great Immigrants Award.

== Legacy ==
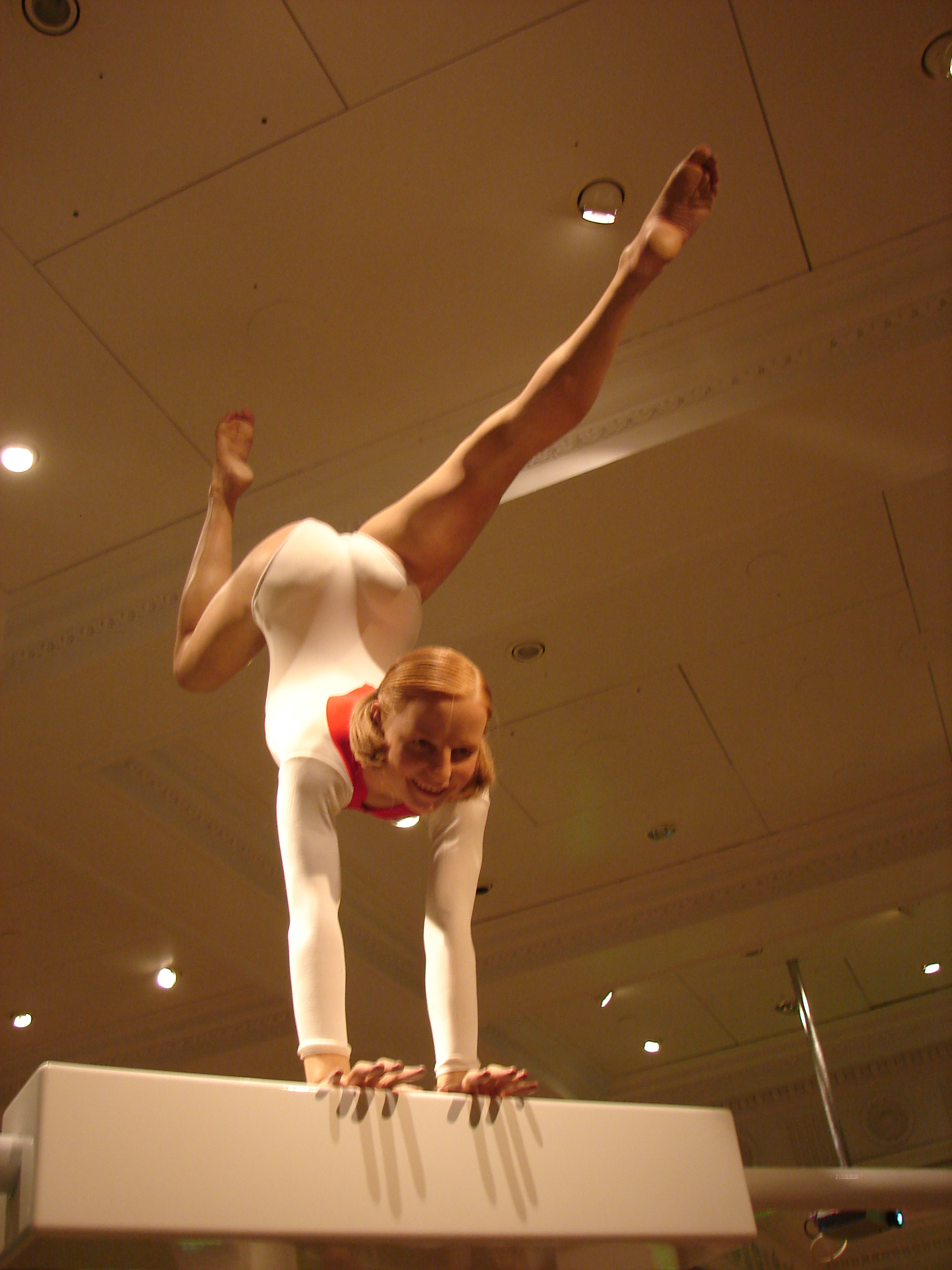
A wax figure of Korbut at Madame Tussauds in London

Korbut is best known for one of her eponymous moves, the Korbut flip, a backflip performed on the uneven parallel bars, starting from a standing position on the high bar and then catching the same bar from below on the under swing. Named after Korbut since she was the first to perform the skill at an international competition in 1972, the move has since been made illegal in the Code of Points, as standing on the bars is no longer allowed.

After the 1972 Olympic competition, she also met United States President Richard Nixon at the White House. About the meeting, Korbut said: "He told me that my performance in Munich did more for reducing the political tension during the Cold War between our two countries than the embassies were able to do in five years." In addition to greatly publicizing gymnastics worldwide, she also contributed to a marked change in the tenor of the sport itself. Prior to 1972, the athletes were generally older and the focus was on elegance rather than acrobatics. In the decade after Korbut's Olympic debut, the emphasis was reversed. Korbut, in her 1972, gold-medal Olympics, at 4 ft 11 in (1.50 m) and 82 pounds (37 kg), exemplified the deliberate and purposeful trend toward smaller women in the sport.

Her 1972 Olympic achievement earned her the BBC Overseas Sports Personality of the Year and ABC's Wide World of Sports title of Athlete of the Year. In a UK poll conducted by Channel 4 in 2002 the public voted "Olga Korbut charms the world" No.46 in the list of the 100 Greatest Sporting Moments.

With her display of artistry and grace, Korbut, along with Nadia Comăneci, brought unprecedented popularity to the sport in the early to mid-1970s, attributes which are now seen as a lost art in gymnastics with athleticism taking precedence.

=== Eponymous skills ===
Korbut has one eponymous vault listed in the Code of Points. She also performed the Korbut flip on both the uneven bars and the balance beam. The uneven bars version was removed from the Code of Points after standing on top of the high bar was banned. The balance beam version is not officially listed under her name due to the low difficulty value.

| Apparatus | Name | Description | Difficulty (Note: Valid for the 2025–2028 Code of Points) |
|---|---|---|---|
| Vault | Korbut | Handspring forward with 1/1 turn (360°) on – 1/1 turn (360°) off | 3.6 |

=== In popular culture ===
In a Peanuts comic strip published on 15 May 1973, the character Snoopy is seen doing balance beam positions with flawless precision on top of his doghouse for three panels until coming to a rest in the fourth one saying: "Olga Korbut has been bugging me for lessons!"

In X-Men #99 (June 1976), Nightcrawler makes a slight reference to Korbut's gymnastic skills in comparison to his own, and Colossus, a fellow Soviet, admonishes him for it.

== Competitive history ==
| Year | Event | Team | AA | VT | UB | BB | FX |
Junior
| 1967 | Junior USSR Championships | | | 1st place, gold medalist(s) | 1st place, gold medalist(s) | | |
Senior
| 1969 | Junior Friendship Tournament | 1st place, gold medalist(s) | | 1st place, gold medalist(s) | | 1st place, gold medalist(s) | 4 |
| 1969 | USSR Championships | | 5 | | | | |
| 1970 | Chunichi Cup | | 2nd place, silver medalist(s) | | | | |
| 1970 | Junior Friendship Tournament | 1st place, gold medalist(s) | 3rd place, bronze medalist(s) | 2nd place, silver medalist(s) | 4 | 3rd place, bronze medalist(s) | |
| 1970 | Tokyo Cup | | | 2nd place, silver medalist(s) | 3rd place, bronze medalist(s) | 2nd place, silver medalist(s) | 1st place, gold medalist(s) |
| 1970 | USSR Championships | | 15 | 1st place, gold medalist(s) | 2nd place, silver medalist(s) | | |
| 1971 | Chunichi Cup | | 3rd place, bronze medalist(s) | | | | |
| 1971 | GDR-USSR Dual Meet | 1st place, gold medalist(s) | 1st place, gold medalist(s) | 1st place, gold medalist(s) | | 1st place, gold medalist(s) | |
| 1971 | JPN-USSR Dual Meet | 1st place, gold medalist(s) | 1st place, gold medalist(s) | | | | |
| 1971 | USSR Championships | | 4 | | | 2nd place, silver medalist(s) | |
| 1972 | Riga International | | 1st place, gold medalist(s) | 1st place, gold medalist(s) | 1st place, gold medalist(s) | 1st place, gold medalist(s) | 1st place, gold medalist(s) |
| 1972 | USSR-FRG-CAN Tri-Meet | 1st place, gold medalist(s) | 1st place, gold medalist(s) | | | | |
| 1972 | USSR-TCH Dual Meet | 1st place, gold medalist(s) | 2nd place, silver medalist(s) | 2nd place, silver medalist(s) | | 1st place, gold medalist(s) | 1st place, gold medalist(s) |
| 1972 | USSR Championships | | 3rd place, bronze medalist(s) | 7 | 2nd place, silver medalist(s) | 2nd place, silver medalist(s) | |
| 1972 | USSR Cup | | 1st place, gold medalist(s) | | | | |
| 1972 | Olympic Games | 1st place, gold medalist(s) | 7 | 5 | 2nd place, silver medalist(s) | 1st place, gold medalist(s) | 1st place, gold medalist(s) |
1973
| 1973 | European Championships | | 2nd place, silver medalist(s) | | | | |
| 1973 | Summer Universiade | 1st place, gold medalist(s) | 1st place, gold medalist(s) | 3rd place, bronze medalist(s) | 1st place, gold medalist(s) | 1st place, gold medalist(s) | 1st place, gold medalist(s) |
| 1974 | USSR Championships | | 2nd place, silver medalist(s) | 1st place, gold medalist(s) | 1st place, gold medalist(s) | | |
| 1974 | USSR Cup | | 4 | | | | |
| 1974 | World Championships | 1st place, gold medalist(s) | 2nd place, silver medalist(s) | 1st place, gold medalist(s) | 2nd place, silver medalist(s) | 2nd place, silver medalist(s) | 2nd place, silver medalist(s) |
| 1975 | USSR Championships | | 1st place, gold medalist(s) | 2nd place, silver medalist(s) | 6 | 2nd place, silver medalist(s) | 6 |
| 1975 | USSR Spartikade | 1st place, gold medalist(s) | 1st place, gold medalist(s) | | | | |
| 1976 | Cup of the White Russian Republic | | 1st place, gold medalist(s) | | | | |
| 1976 | USSR Cup | | 3rd place, bronze medalist(s) | 2nd place, silver medalist(s) | 1st place, gold medalist(s) | | |
| 1976 | Olympic Games | 1st place, gold medalist(s) | 5 | | 5 | 2nd place, silver medalist(s) | |

== See also ==
- List of people from Belarus
- List of multiple Olympic gold medalists at a single Games
- List of top Olympic gymnastics medalists
- List of Olympic female gymnasts for the Soviet Union
