= Erika Zuchold =

German gymnast

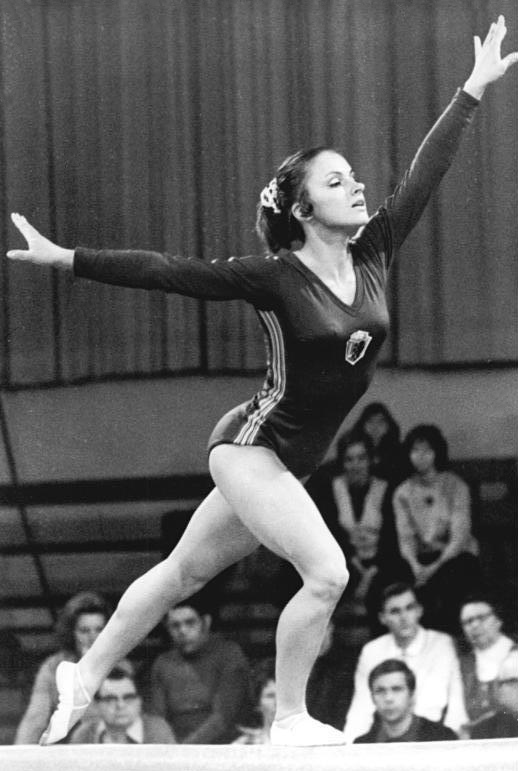
- Zuchold in 1972

Personal information
- Born: 19 March 1947 Lucka, Soviet occupation zone, Germany
- Died: 22 August 2015 (aged 68) Asunción, Paraguay

Gymnastics career
- Discipline: Women's artistic gymnastics
- Country represented: East Germany
- Retired: 1972
Medal record
Olympic Games
Silver medal – second place	1968 Mexico City	Vault
Silver medal – second place	1972 Munich	Team
Silver medal – second place	1972 Munich	Vault
Silver medal – second place	1972 Munich	Uneven bars
Bronze medal – third place	1968 Mexico City	Team
World Championships
Gold medal – first place	1970 Ljubljana	Vault
Gold medal – first place	1970 Ljubljana	Balance beam
Silver medal – second place	1966 Dortmund	Vault
Silver medal – second place	1970 Ljubljana	Team
Silver medal – second place	1970 Ljubljana	All-around
European Championships
Silver medal – second place	1967 Amsterdam	Vault
Silver medal – second place	1969 Landskrona	Vault
Bronze medal – third place	1969 Landskrona	All-around
Bronze medal – third place	1971 Minsk	All-around
Bronze medal – third place	1971 Minsk	Vault
Bronze medal – third place	1971 Minsk	Balance beam
Bronze medal – third place	1971 Minsk	Floor exercise

Erika Zuchold (née Barth; 19 March 1947 – 22 August 2015) was an East German gymnast who competed at the European, World, and Olympic level from the mid-1960s to early 1970s.

She and Karin Janz were the two most significant (in terms of medals won at major championships) female German gymnasts of the era, leading the East German team to a bronze medal at the 1968 Olympics and a silver medal at the 1972 Olympics.

The highlight of Zuchold's career came at the 1970 World Championships, where she placed second in the individual all-around behind the Soviet Ludmilla Tourischeva and returned to win gold on both vault and balance beam in event finals.

Zuchold is credited as being the first woman to perform a back handspring on balance beam in World or Olympic competition (at the 1966 World Championships), as well as one of the first two women, along with Věra Čáslavská at the 1968 Olympics, to complete a front handspring on balance beam. She also had a transition element named after her on uneven bars.

In her post-gymnastics career, she was a trapeze artist, a curator, an educator, and an abstract painter. In 2005, she was inducted into the International Gymnastics Hall of Fame.

She was married to the cyclist Dieter Zuchold (1937–2014).

== See also ==
- List of top Olympic gymnastics medalists
