= Ludmilla Tourischeva =

Russian gymnast (born 1952)

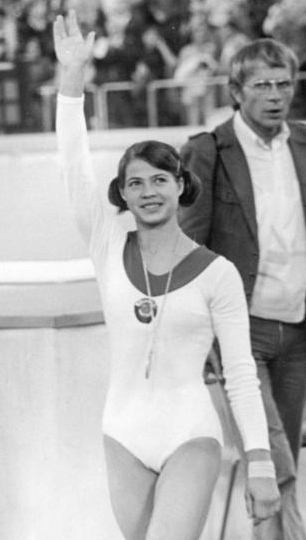
- Tourischeva at the 1972 Summer Olympics

Personal information
- Full name: Ludmilla Ivanovna Tourischeva
- Born: 7 October 1952 (age 74) Grozny, Russian SFSR, Soviet Union
- Height: 160 cm (5 ft 3 in)

Gymnastics career
- Discipline: Women's artistic gymnastics
- Country represented: Soviet Union
- Club: Dynamo
- Head coach: Vladislav Rastorotsky
Medal record
Representing Soviet Union
Olympic Games
Gold medal – first place	1968 Mexico City	Team
Gold medal – first place	1972 Munich	Team
Gold medal – first place	1972 Munich	All-Around
Gold medal – first place	1976 Montreal	Team
Silver medal – second place	1972 Munich	Floor Exercise
Silver medal – second place	1976 Montreal	Vault
Silver medal – second place	1976 Montreal	Floor Exercise
Bronze medal – third place	1972 Munich	Vault
Bronze medal – third place	1976 Montreal	All-Around
World Championships
Gold medal – first place	1970 Ljubljana	Team
Gold medal – first place	1970 Ljubljana	All-Around
Gold medal – first place	1970 Ljubljana	Floor Exercise
Gold medal – first place	1974 Varna	All-Around
Gold medal – first place	1974 Varna	Team
Gold medal – first place	1974 Varna	Floor Exercise
Gold medal – first place	1974 Varna	Balance Beam
Silver medal – second place	1970 Ljubljana	Uneven Bars
Silver medal – second place	1974 Varna	Vault
Bronze medal – third place	1970 Ljubljana	Vault
Bronze medal – third place	1974 Varna	Uneven Bars
World Cup Final
Gold medal – first place	1975 London	All-Around
Gold medal – first place	1975 London	Vault
Gold medal – first place	1975 London	Uneven Bars
Gold medal – first place	1975 London	Balance Beam
Gold medal – first place	1975 London	Floor Exercise
European Championships
Gold medal – first place	1971 Minsk	All-Around
Gold medal – first place	1971 Minsk	Vault
Gold medal – first place	1971 Minsk	Floor Exercise
Gold medal – first place	1973 London	All-Around
Gold medal – first place	1973 London	Vault
Gold medal – first place	1973 London	Uneven Bars
Gold medal – first place	1973 London	Balance Beam
Gold medal – first place	1973 London	Floor Exercise
Silver medal – second place	1971 Minsk	Uneven Bars
Silver medal – second place	1971 Minsk	Balance Beam
Bronze medal – third place	1969 Landskrona	All-Around
Bronze medal – third place	1969 Landskrona	Uneven Bars
Bronze medal – third place	1969 Landskrona	Floor Exercise
Bronze medal – third place	1975 Skien	Floor Exercise

Ludmilla Ivanovna Tourischeva (Russian: Людми́ла Ива́новна Тури́щева; also transliterated as Ludmilla Turischeva, Ludmilla Tourischcheva, and Ljudmila Turichtchieva, born 7 October 1952) is a former Russian gymnast, Ukrainian gymnast coach, all around Olympic champion and a nine-time Olympic medalist for the Soviet Union.

== Career ==
Tourischeva began gymnastics in 1965, at age 13, and began competing for the Soviet team in 1967. Coached by Vladislav Rastorotsky (who later trained Natalia Shaposhnikova and Natalia Yurchenko), she represented the Soviet Union at the 1968 Summer Olympics, just after her 16th birthday. She won the gold medal with the team and placed 24th in the all-around.

Two years later, Tourischeva became the leader of the Soviet team. From 1970 to 1974, she dominated almost every major international competition, winning the World Championships all-around gold in 1970 and 1974, the European Championships in 1971 and 1973, and the World Cup in 1975.

At the 1972 Summer Olympics in Munich, Tourischeva won the all-around gold medal but was overshadowed by the sudden popularity of her younger compatriot Olga Korbut. She qualified for all four event finals, and won a silver and a bronze. Tourischeva was one of the first female gymnasts to use two separate pieces of music for her floor routines at an international competition. For the team competition, she used "March" from the film Circus by Isaak Dunaevsky, while for the all around, she used the music to the film Die Frau meiner Träume by Franz Grothe.

At the 1975 European Championships, Tourischeva placed fourth in the all-around behind 13-year-old Nadia Comăneci of Romania (who also won the vault, uneven bars, and balance beam apparatus finals), her own teammate Nellie Kim (who placed second and won the floor exercise final) and Annelore Zinke. This marked the first time in 5 years that Ludmilla lost an all-around competition.

After struggling with a back injury, Tourischeva competed in her third Olympics, the 1976 Summer Games in Montreal, where she won her third team gold with the Soviet squad. In the all-around, she finished third behind Comăneci and Kim. She won silver medals on vault and floor exercise in the event finals, losing to Kim but overcoming Comăneci, bringing her total Olympic medal count to four gold, three silver, and two bronze.

Tourischeva was known for her calm demeanor in competition. In 1980, British journalist David Hunn wrote that she "never had the cheek of some of her rivals, but for serenity she was supreme". This was famously illustrated during the 1975 World Cup at Wembley Stadium in London, when a broken hook holding support cables of the uneven bars caused the apparatus to fall apart and crash to the ground just as Tourischeva landed her dismount. Saluting the judges, she walked off the podium without even turning around to look at the remains of the apparatus. She went on to win the all-around and all four event finals. Years later, she said of the incident that, at that moment, she had thought only one thing: she must complete her routine and "stick it". Rastorotsky, her coach, said, "Ljudmila would fight to death in any situation."

She was also known for her gracious manner. At the 1976 Olympics, she walked around the podium to personally congratulate champion Comăneci and shake her hand before accepting her own medal.

Tourischeva is one of only two women, the other being Yelena Shushunova, who have won the "grand slam" of all-around titles: Olympics, World Championships, World Cup, and European Championships. She is also one of only two women to win four gold medals at a single World Championships (in 1974). The other is Simone Biles of the United States, who won four in 2014, 2015, and 2018; Biles broke the record and won five gold medals in 2019.

== Post-gymnastics life ==
In 1977, Tourischeva married the sprinter Valeriy Borzov, a two-time Olympic champion, in 1972. She was elected to the Women's Artistic Gymnastics Technical Committee of the International Gymnastics Federation (FIG) in 1981, and has remained involved in gymnastics as a coach, an international judge, and an official with the Ukrainian gymnastics federation. One of her protégés was Lilia Podkopayeva of Ukraine, the all-around gold medalist at the 1996 Olympics.

Tourischeva has received various honors for her gymnastics career, including the Women in Sport trophy from the International Olympic Committee. In 1998, she was inducted into the International Gymnastics Hall of Fame.

== Eponymous skill ==
Tourischeva has one eponymous skill listed in the Code of Points.

Apparatus	Name	Description	Difficulty (Note: Valid for the 2025-2028 Code of Points)
Vault	Tourischeva	Tsukahara tucked	3.2

== Medals (non-Olympic) ==
Year	Event	AA	Team	VT	UB	BB	FX
1967	USSR Cup	1st					
1968	USSR Cup	3rd					
1969	European Championships	3rd			3rd		3rd
1969	USSR Championships	3rd		2nd		2nd	2nd
1969	USSR Cup	1st					
1970	World Championships	1st	1st	3rd	2nd		1st
1970	USSR Championships				1st		1st
1970	USSR Cup	3rd					
1971	European Championships	1st		1st	2nd	2nd	1st
1971	USSR Championships			2nd	3rd		2nd
1971	USSR Cup	1st					
1972	USSR Championships	1st		1st	1st		
1972	USSR Cup	2nd					
1973	European Championships	1st		1st	1st	1st	1st
1973	USSR Championships			1st	1st		
1973	USSR Cup	1st					
1974	World Championships	1st	1st	2nd	3rd	1st	1st
1974	USSR Championships	1st					
1974	USSR Cup	1st					
1975	World Cup	1st		1st	1st	1st	1st
1975	European Championships						3rd
1975	USSR Championships	3rd		1st			
1976	USSR Cup	2nd					

== See also ==
- List of multiple Olympic medalists
- List of multiple Olympic gold medalists
- List of multiple Summer Olympic medalists
- List of top Olympic gymnastics medalists
- List of top medalists at the World Artistic Gymnastics Championships
- List of Olympic female gymnasts for the Soviet Union
