= 1977 European Women's Artistic Gymnastics Championships =

11th European Women's Artistic Gymnastics Championships
- Location: Prague, Czech Republic
- Dates: 13–14 May 1977

The 11th European Women's Artistic Gymnastics Championships were held in Prague.

== Romanian Withdrawal ==
The Romanian team walked out the competition during the beam finals. According to the Romanian federation, this decision was taken "as a result of some technical deficiencies and of some methods appeared in the referees' actions which altered the results".

Ironically, the Romanian withdrawal happened right after Nadia Comăneci's performance, for which she received a perfect 10. If she had not left the building, she would have won the gold medal in the beam finals.

== Medalists ==
Event	Gold	Silver	Bronze
Seniors
All-Around	Nadia Comăneci (ROU)	Elena Mukhina (URS)	Nellie Kim (URS)
Vault	Nellie Kim (URS)	Nadia Comăneci (ROU)	Elena Mukhina (URS)
Uneven Bars	Nadia Comăneci (ROU); Elena Mukhina (URS)		Steffi Kräker (GDR)
Balance Beam	Elena Mukhina (URS)	Nellie Kim (URS)	Maria Filatova (URS)
Floor	Elena Mukhina (URS); Maria Filatova (URS)		Nellie Kim (URS)

== Results ==
=== Vault ===
Rank	Gymnast	Total
1st place, gold medalist(s)	Nellie Kim (URS)	19.525
2nd place, silver medalist(s)	Nadia Comaneci (ROU)	19.500
3rd place, bronze medalist(s)	Elena Mukhina (URS)	19.450
4	Steffi Kraker (GDR)	19.325
5	Maria Filatova (URS)	19.325
6	Marta Egervari (HUN)	19.275
7	Heike Kunhardt (GDR)	19.050
8	Teodora Ungureanu (ROU)	18.800

=== Uneven Bars ===
Rank	Gymnast	Total
1st place, gold medalist(s)	Elena Mukhina (URS)	19.650
1st place, gold medalist(s)	Nadia Comaneci (ROU)	19.650
3rd place, bronze medalist(s)	Steffi Kraker (GDR)	19.600
4	Nellie Kim (URS)	19.500
5	Ingrid Holkovicova (TCH)	19.450
6	Maria Filatova (URS)	19.300
7	Teodora Ungureanu (ROU)	19.250
8	Heike Kunhardt (GDR)	18.350

=== Balance Beam ===
Rank	Gymnast	Total
1st place, gold medalist(s)	Elena Mukhina (URS)	19.400
2nd place, silver medalist(s)	Nellie Kim (URS)	19.350
3rd place, bronze medalist(s)	Maria Filatova (URS)	19.250
4	Eva Ovari (HUN)	19.200
5	Birgit Emmrich (GDR)	19.100
6	Ingrid Holkovicova (TCH)	18.600
7	Marta Egervari (HUN)	18.500

=== Floor exercise ===
Rank	Gymnast	Total
1st place, gold medalist(s)	Elena Mukhina (URS)	19.700
1st place, gold medalist(s)	Maria Filatova (URS)	19.700
3rd place, bronze medalist(s)	Nellie Kim (URS)	19.550
4	Heike Kunhardt (GDR)	19.200
5	Steffi Kraker (GDR)	19.100
6	Marta Egervari (HUN)	18.950
7	Ingrid Holkovicova (TCH)	18.850
