= Gymnastics at the 1976 Summer Olympics – Women's artistic individual all-around =

Women's artistic individual all-around at the Games of the XXI Olympiad
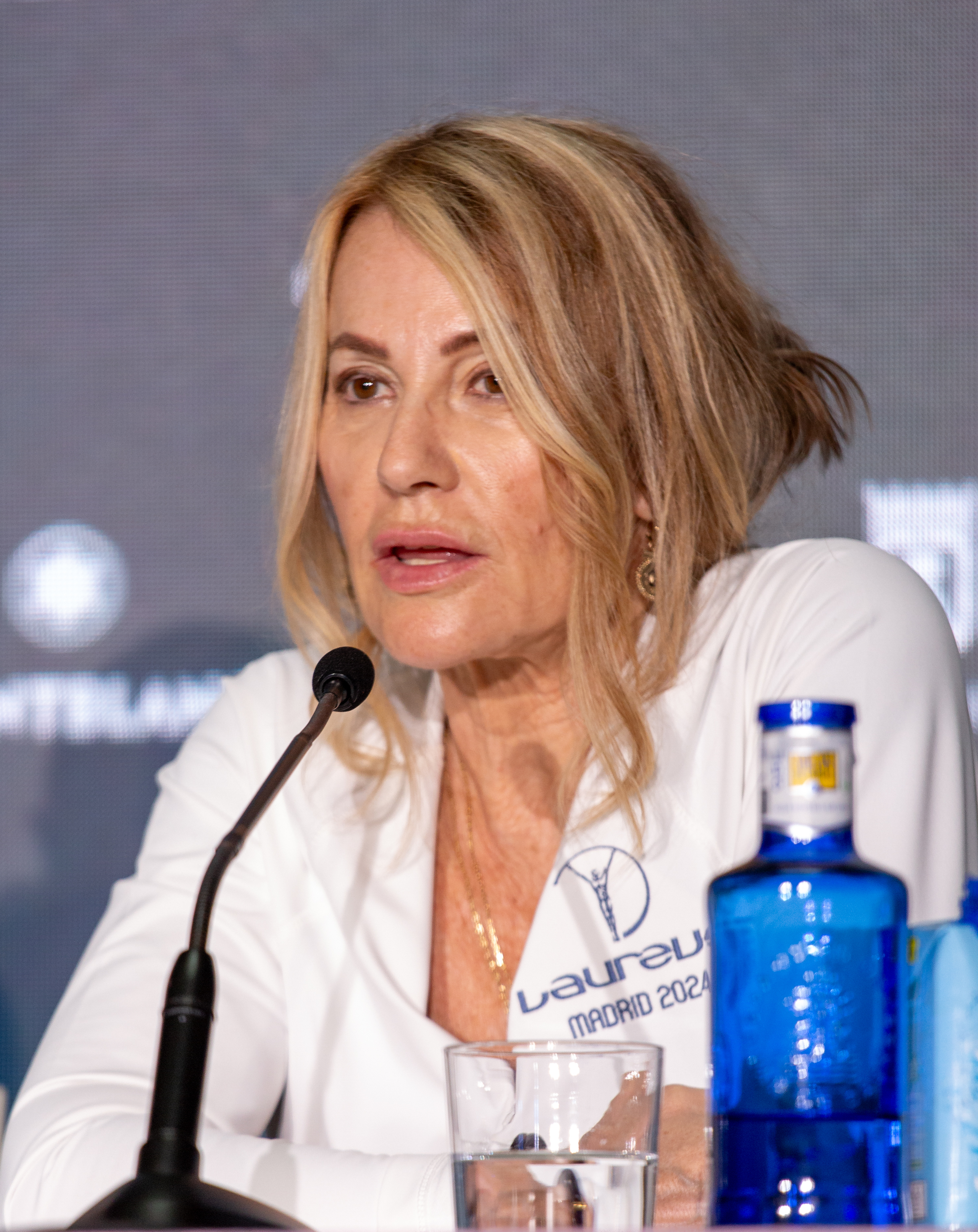
- Gold medalist Nadia Comăneci (2024)
- Competitors: 86 from 23 nations

Medalists
1st place, gold medalist(s)		Nadia Comăneci	Romania
2nd place, silver medalist(s)		Nellie Kim	Soviet Union
3rd place, bronze medalist(s)		Ludmilla Tourischeva	Soviet Union

These are the results of the women's individual all-around competition, one of six events for female competitors in artistic gymnastics at the 1976 Summer Olympics in Montreal. The qualification and final rounds took place on July 18, 19, and 21 at the Montreal Forum.

== Results ==
=== Qualification ===
Eighty-six gymnasts competed in the compulsory and optional rounds on July 18 and 19. The thirty-six highest scoring gymnasts advanced to the final on July 21. Each country was limited to three competitors in the final. Half of the points earned by each gymnast during both the compulsory and optional rounds carried over to the final. This constitutes each gymnast's "prelim" score.

=== Final ===
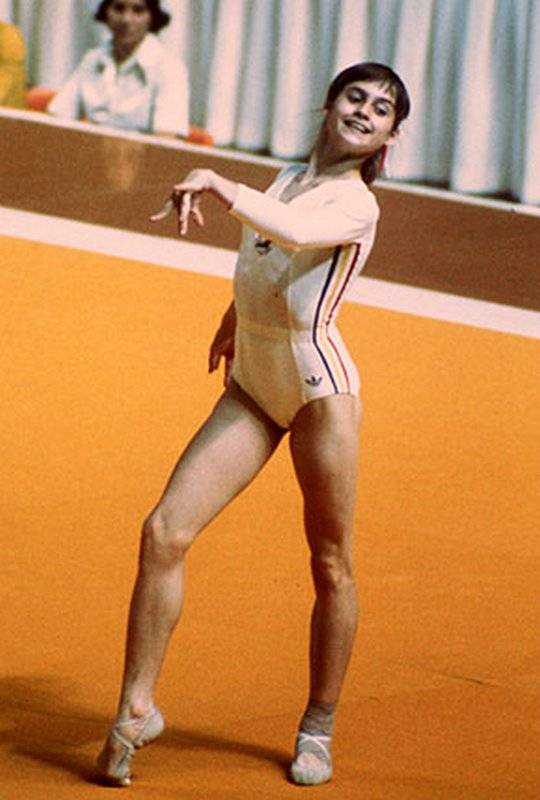
Nadia Comăneci at the 1976 Summer Olympics

Rank	Gymnast	Vault	Uneven Bars	Balance Beam	Floor	Score	Prelim score	Total
1st place, gold medalist(s)	Nadia Comăneci (ROU)	9.850	10.000	10.000	9.900	39.750	39.525	79.275
2nd place, silver medalist(s)	Nellie Kim (URS)	10.000	9.900	9.700	9.950	39.550	39.125	78.675
3rd place, bronze medalist(s)	Ludmilla Tourischeva (URS)	9.950	9.800	9.850	9.900	39.500	39.125	78.625
4	Teodora Ungureanu (ROU)	9.750	9.900	9.900	9.800	39.350	39.025	78.375
5	Olga Korbut (URS)	9.800	9.900	9.500	9.850	39.050	38.975	78.025
6	Gitta Escher (GDR)	9.900	9.850	9.550	9.650	38.950	38.800	77.750
7	Márta Egervári (HUN)	9.900	9.900	9.350	9.650	38.800	38.525	77.325
8	Marion Kische (GDR)	9.750	9.800	9.100	9.700	38.350	38.600	76.950
9	Kerstin Gerschau (GDR)	9.650	9.750	9.650	9.250	38.300	38.500	76.800
10	Anna Pohludková (TCH)	9.500	9.750	9.500	9.800	38.550	38.225	76.775
11	Mariana Constantin (ROU)	9.800	9.800	9.000	9.650	38.250	38.375	76.625
12	Andrea Bieger (FRG)	9.700	9.700	9.650	9.600	38.300	37.975	76.275
13	Krisztina Medveczky (HUN)	9.700	9.300	9.300	9.600	37.900	38.075	75.975
14	Kimberly Chace (USA)	9.500	9.700	9.450	9.500	38.150	37.725	75.875
15	Jana Knopová (TCH)	9.400	9.600	9.600	9.650	38.250	37.550	75.800
16	Ingrid Holkovičová (TCH)	9.750	9.700	8.900	9.600	37.950	37.800	75.750
17	Margit Tóth (HUN)	9.500	9.750	8.750	9.550	37.550	38.025	75.575
18	Debra Willcox (USA)	9.600	9.450	9.250	9.500	37.800	37.525	75.325
18	Leslie Wolfsberger (USA)	9.400	9.600	9.450	9.550	38.000	37.325	75.325
20	Miyuki Hironaka (JPN)	9.550	9.500	9.300	9.450	37.800	37.500	75.300
21	Nadya Shatarova (BUL)	9.800	9.750	9.250	9.400	38.200	36.950	75.150
22	Ans Smulders (NED)	9.450	9.700	9.200	9.450	37.800	37.300	75.100
23	Stefania Bucci (ITA)	9.450	9.450	9.350	9.600	37.850	37.150	75.000
23	Jutta Oltersdorf (FRG)	9.400	9.700	9.250	9.350	37.700	37.300	75.000
25	Jeannette van Ravenstijn (NED)	9.450	9.550	9.100	9.500	37.600	37.100	74.700
26	Petra Kurbjuweit (FRG)	9.600	9.550	8.700	9.500	37.350	37.300	74.650
27	Karen Kelsall (CAN)	9.000	9.600	9.250	9.600	37.450	37.175	74.625
28	Galina Yaneva (BUL)	9.500	9.450	9.350	9.350	37.650	36.875	74.525
29	Patti Rope (CAN)	9.350	9.550	9.150	9.500	37.550	36.950	74.500
30	Satoko Okazaki (JPN)	8.950	9.600	8.700	9.550	36.800	37.650	74.450
31	Nina Kostova (BUL)	9.550	9.100	8.900	9.500	37.050	37.300	74.350
32	Joëlle De Keukeleire (BEL)	9.500	9.400	9.200	9.400	37.500	36.600	74.100
33	Nancy McDonnell (CAN)	9.350	9.500	8.750	9.500	37.100	36.950	74.050
34	Nobue Yamazaki (JPN)	9.400	9.500	8.750	9.350	37.000	36.925	73.925
35	Avril Lennox (GBR)	9.400	9.600	9.150	8.900	37.050	36.825	73.875
36	Monique Bolleboom (NED)	9.200	9.550	8.650	9.400	36.800	36.550	73.350
