= Elena Mukhina =

Soviet gymnast (1960–2006)

- Елена Мухина

Personal information
- Full name: Elena Vyacheslavovna Mukhina
- Alternative names: Elena Muchina; Yelena Muchina; Yelena Mukhina
- Born: 1 June 1960 Moscow, Russian SFSR, Soviet Union
- Died: 22 December 2006 (aged 46) Moscow, Russia

Gymnastics career
- Discipline: Women's artistic gymnastics
- Country represented: Soviet Union; (3)
- Club: CSKA Moscow
- Head coach: Mikhail Klimenko
- Eponymous skills: Mukhina salto (floor exercise), Mukhina hecht (uneven bars), Mukhina flip (uneven bars)
Medal record
Representing Soviet Union
World Championships
Gold medal – first place	1978 Strasbourg	Team
Gold medal – first place	1978 Strasbourg	All-Around
Gold medal – first place	1978 Strasbourg	Floor Exercise
Silver medal – second place	1978 Strasbourg	Uneven Bars
Silver medal – second place	1978 Strasbourg	Balance Beam
World Cup Final
Gold medal – first place	1977 Oviedo	Uneven Bars
Gold medal – first place	1977 Oviedo	Balance Beam
European Championships
Gold medal – first place	1977 Prague	Balance Beam
Gold medal – first place	1977 Prague	Floor Exercise
Gold medal – first place	1977 Prague	Uneven Bars
Silver medal – second place	1977 Prague	All-Around
Bronze medal – third place	1977 Prague	Vault
Gold medal – first place	1979 Copenhagen	Uneven Bars
Silver medal – second place	1979 Copenhagen	Floor Exercise

Elena Vyacheslavovna Mukhina (Russian: Елена Вячеславовна Мухина; first name sometimes rendered "Yelena", last name sometimes rendered "Muchina"; 1 June 1960 – 22 December 2006) was a Soviet gymnast who won the all-around title at the 1978 World Championships in Strasbourg, France. Her career was on the rise, and she was widely touted as the next great gymnastics star until 1979, when she broke a leg and missed several competitions. The rushed recovery from that injury, combined with pressure to master a dangerous and difficult tumbling move (the Thomas salto) caused her to break her neck two weeks before the opening of the 1980 Summer Olympics, leaving her permanently quadriplegic.

== Early life ==
Elena Mukhina was born 1 June 1960, in Moscow. She was raised by her grandmother, Anna Ivanovna after being orphaned at a young age; according to different sources, she was either orphaned at age five, or her mother died when she was three and her father left the family.

== Career ==
Mukhina took an interest in gymnastics and figure skating at an early age. When an athletic scout visited her school, she eagerly volunteered to try out for gymnastics. She later joined the CSKA Moscow sports club and was eventually inducted into the CSKA Hall of Fame.

Through 1975, Mukhina was largely unnoticed as a gymnast. Then, two separate incidents brought her to the forefront for the Soviet team. Firstly was the Romanian domination of the Soviet gymnasts at the 1976 Olympics. For this, the director for Soviet women's gymnastics, Larisa Latynina, was blamed but responded, "it's not my fault that Nadia Comăneci was not born in the Soviet Union.". This increased pressure on Soviet gymnasts to return to winning competitions. Secondly was Mukhina's transition to working with men's coach Mikhail Klimenko.

Klimenko had not worked with girls before, but Mukhina's previous coach, Alexander Eglit, encouraged him to consider her. Klimenko was impressed by her intelligence and coordination and began training her. In a 1978 profile, Mukhina described herself as someone who wanted to perform advanced acrobatics but was scared of them and often cried when Klimenko began teaching her new elements.

She participated in the 1975 Spartakiad and, after a poor landing, suffered a spinal injury that made her unable to turn her head. She was supposed to wear a cervical collar to recover, but Klimenko daily brought her from the hospital to the gym to train without it. Mukhina was reportedly afraid to disclose injuries to her coach and would hide them from him. She once dislocated her thumb and continued training through intense pain after repositioning it herself, and on another occasion, she won a competition after having received a concussion, stimulating herself with smelling salts.

Mukhina won the 1976 Soviet junior championships, though she did not qualify as a member of the Olympic team.

Throughout her early career, Mukhina was given multiple different birth years. She was described as being 15 in an October 1974 article in Krasnaya Zvezda, the official newspaper of the Soviet military, implying she was born in 1959. However, in March 1976, Sovetsky Sport, the official Soviet sports newspaper, published the national gymnastics teams and gave her a birth year of 1961, as did both domestic and foreign articles describing her appearances in gymnastics meets over the next few months. Late in 1976, Soviet sources began to give her birth year as 1960, the year that is engraved on her headstone.

In 1977, at the 1977 European Championships, she won silver and the all-around and three event titles in the balance beam, uneven bars, and floor exercise finals, along with a bronze medal on vault. She also placed second at the Soviet championships. Later in the year, she competed at the USSR Cup. There she ruptured her Achilles tendon and continued competing against medical advice, and she won the all-around silver medal.

The next year, she won the all-around at the Soviet championships despite pain in her foot.

Mukhina drew notice at the 1978 World Championships in Strasbourg, France, when she won the all-around ahead of Olympic champions Nadia Comăneci and Nellie Kim. She also tied for gold in the floor exercise event final and won two silver medals on balance beam and uneven bars. At the event, she debuted three new elements: a full-twisting layout Korbut flip on the uneven bars, a tucked double back salto dismount on balance beam, and a full-twisting double back salto on floor. Mukhina was praised for combining difficult routines with a graceful and individual style. She was predicted to be a possible contender at the upcoming 1980 Summer Olympics in Moscow.

In 1979, Mukhina placed fourth in the all-around at the 1979 European Championships, where she also won gold on the uneven bars and silver on the floor. This was her last major competition.

A 1978 documentary film of the Soviet national team, You are in Gymnastics (Russian: Ты в гимнастике) features Mukhina talking with her coach, Mikhail Klimenko, and footage of her rigorous training regimen. The film presented her as an example of a gymnast who used willpower to overcome pain.

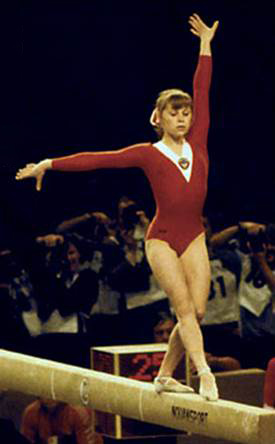
Elena Mukhina on balance beam at the 1978 World Championships in Strasbourg

== Injury ==
Mukhina's floor exercise tumbling passes were considered revolutionary at the time because they included a never-before seen combination salto (the "Mukhina"). In 1979, her coach wanted her to take it a step further and become one of the few female gymnasts to do an element taken from men's gymnastics, the Thomas salto (a 1½ backflip with 1½ twists ending in a forward roll, perfected by American gymnast Kurt Thomas).

Mukhina soon realized the Thomas salto was extremely dangerous, because it depended on being able to get enough height and speed to make all the flips and mid-air twists and still land in-bounds with enough room to do the forward roll, and it took perfect timing to avoid either under-rotation (and landing on the chin) or over-rotation (and landing on the back of the head). In the 1991 documentary More than a Game, Mukhina spoke of trying to convince her coach that the Thomas salto was a dangerous element:

... my injury could have been expected. It was an accident that could have been anticipated. It was inevitable. I had said more than once that I would break my neck doing that element. I had hurt myself badly several times but he [coach Mikhail Klimenko] just replied people like me don't break their necks.

In 1979, while training for the 1979 World Artistic Gymnastics Championships, Mukhina, already suffering from fatigue from her workouts to the point where she struggled to cross the street in front of her gym before the pedestrian light changed, broke her leg. Due to her injury, she did not compete at the World Championships, where the Soviet women's team lost to the Romanian team, and only Nellie Kim and Stella Zakharova were able to medal. She did not want to keep competing, but Klimenko persuaded her to continue training.

With less than a year until the 1980 Summer Olympics would be held in Moscow, the pressure was on the Soviet team coaches and doctors to get the previous all-around champion Mukhina back on her feet and ready for the games. In an interview with Ogonyok magazine, Mukhina blamed the doctors at TsITO (Central Institute of Traumatology and Orthopedics), who were serving the National Team, for attempting to rush her back into training too soon, saying she begged them not to remove her cast and discharge her because "they're dragging me from home to workouts", and she knew she was not yet healed. When doctors removed her cast against her wishes and had her try walking on the leg, she said that she knew she was walking "crookedly", and that something was not right. The TsITO doctors x-rayed the leg, and discovered that the fracture had not healed properly. Mukhina was rushed into surgery that afternoon, but the damage had already been done to her reputation; one of the National Team coaches, she said in the Ogonyok interview, showed up at her bed the day after surgery, and outright stated that she "wasn't conscientious", and that she could still "train in a cast".

Once more against her wishes, the doctors removed her cast prematurely, and Mukhina returned to training for the Olympics while beginning a strenuous workout program at CSKA Moscow to lose the weight she had gained while laid up from surgery. She also took furosemide, a diuretic that causes a loss of calcium, which one specialist blamed for her later accident; Mukhina denied that it significantly changed her performance, and a teammate noted that using it was extremely common among Soviet gymnasts to quickly lose weight when coaches demanded they do so.

With lingering weakness in her leg, and mounting exhaustion from the grueling weight loss workouts, Mukhina had great difficulty coming back up to speed on what was to be the new end element of one of her floor exercise tumbling passes, the Thomas salto. Despite Mukhina's warnings that the element was constantly causing minor injuries and had the potential to cause major injuries, she was pushed to keep the element in her floor routine.

Mukhina was sent to the pre-Olympic training camp at the Minsk Palace of Sport. She was under particular pressure as she was from Moscow, and she described herself as feeling like an animal being driven with a whip. While she wanted to be left alone, she claimed that Klimenko told her that would only happen if she crashed into the floor platform.

On 3 July 1980, at the Palace of Sport, two weeks before the Moscow Olympics, Mukhina was practising the pass containing the Thomas salto when she under-rotated the salto. She landed on her chin and broke three vertebrae in her spine, leaving her quadriplegic. Her coach Klimenko was not present, having left the day prior for Moscow to report that she had mastered the Thomas salto. She required surgery afterward. Lidiya Ivanova said that while Mukhina had not been feeling well that day, an unnamed coach at the training camp insisted that she show a floor exercise with full difficulty.

Following the injury, inconsistent information was released about the circumstances of the accident and her condition. For example, Soviet newspapers reported she had fallen during her dismount from the balance beam and had a blackout, but she then got back up to finish her floor exercise without knowing how badly she had been injured. Other Soviet reports hid the extent of her injury, saying that she was recovering well and that she could stand. The Associated Press reported on 8 July that she had been injured on a fall from the uneven bars with unknown injuries that would prevent her from competing at the Olympics, and later reporting said that she had broken her spine training a double salto on floor but that Soviet officials denied that she was paralyzed.

Soviet team coach Yuri Titov deflected inquiries about whether Mukhina would be trying for a comeback in 1984, even blaming her "injury" on attempting a skill that she "was not able to do but thought she needed to make the team [...] she suffered injury and missed her chance. [...] All the bad stories, they are not true." It was not until October 1981, more than a year after her accident, that an article in the state newspaper Pravda stated that she was paralyzed performing the Thomas salto.

Nellie Kim, a fellow Soviet gymnast who was on the 1980 Olympic team, said in a 2020 interview that while she did not witness Mukhina's accident personally, the news of it made her fearful. She was already afraid of performing several of her elements, and she decided not to continue gymnastics after the Olympics once she heard of Mukhina's injury.

== Aftermath and later life ==
=== Aftermath of injury ===
Mukhina became a recluse following the accident and rarely discussed it publicly. In one of her few interviews about the accident, published in Ogonyok magazine, she criticized the Soviet gymnastics program for valuing medals over the well-being of athletes:

...for our country, athletic successes and victories have always meant somewhat more than even simply the prestige of the nation. They embodied (and embody) the correctness of the political path we have chosen, the advantages of the system, and they are becoming a symbol of superiority. Hence the demand for victory – at any price. As for risk, well... We've always placed a high value on risk, and a human life was worth little in comparison with the prestige of the nation; we've been taught to believe this since childhood. [...] There are such concepts as the honor of the club, the honor of the team, the honor of the national squad, the honor of the flag. They are words behind which the person isn't perceived. I'm not condemning anyone or blaming anyone for what happened to me. Not Klimenko or especially the national team coach at that time, Shaniyazov. I feel sorry for Klimenko – he's a victim of the system, a member of the clan of grownups who are 'doing their job.' Shaniyazov I simply don't respect. And the others? I was injured because everyone around me was observing neutrality and keeping silent. After all, they saw that I wasn't ready to perform that element. But they kept quiet. Nobody stopped a person who, forgetting everything, was tearing forward – go, go, go!

Mukhina expressed sympathy for Klimenko, seeing him as another person who had been pressured by the Soviet system. However, she also criticized coaches for the way they treated children under immense stress and called on coaches to be more flexible and treat both athletes and other coaches with dignity. She said that she thought the trend towards younger gymnasts was caused by incorrect training approaches, saying, "It is far easier to work with small, mute creatures, who look at a coach as an idol and perform everything without even talking back."

Despite her criticism, Mukhina took some of the responsibility for not saying no to protect herself from further harm, and noted that her first thought as she lay on the floor with her neck severely broken was, "Thank God, I won't be going to the Olympics." In another interview, she said that she was too obedient to her coaches and that she was "let down by my own inability to say 'no'" when she was asked to practice the Thomas salto the day of her injury.

In an interview with Larisa Latynina in 2004, Latynina blamed Mukhina's trainer, Mikhail Klimenko, for her accident. There was little doubt that the Soviet Olympic women's gymnastics team would get the gold medal in the team competition at the 1980 Summer Olympics, as it had at all previous Olympics, but Mukhina was not yet named to the team at the time of her accident. According to Latynina, he badly wanted his gymnast to become an Olympic champion, so he forced her to train despite the condition of her leg.

Though Mukhina criticized Klimenko for not listening to her about her health before the accident, she remained in contact with him; in 1989, she said that he would call her and visit her on her birthday. In the 1980s, Klimenko emigrated to Italy with his wife and children to head the Women's Olympic Preparation Center. He lived there until his death on 14 November 2007, his 65th birthday.

The Soviet Union awarded her the Order of the Badge of Honour in 1980 in response to her injury. In 1981, IOC President Juan Samaranch awarded her the Silver Medal of the Olympic Order.

=== Personal life ===
Mukhina was given a larger apartment with a balcony she could access and a pension, along with a television. Other gymnasts and sports societies aided her and raised money, and she was also visited by medical students who attempted to help improve her paralysis.

Mukhina graduated from the Physical Culture Institute in 1984 and noted that she was "extremely grateful" to her teachers, as they had to come to her bedside to teach her and give exams. In a 1987 interview, she said that she was thinking about working in sports not as a coach but "on a mass scale", although her day-to-day life was focused on reading books and training in a manner inspired by Valentin Dikul, who made a significant recovery after a spinal injury. She also received letters from gymnasts she had competed against, as well as former teammate Yelena Davydova, whom she called "a real friend". In 1989, she said that Dikul's training method damaged her kidneys and caused her to need several surgeries and hospital stays, so she had to stop the exercises, for which Dikul publicly criticized her.

She was a guest columnist for The Moscow News in the late 1980s. Her injury was a featured topic in the 1991 A&E documentary More Than a Game, and her World Championship performance was included in the ABC Sports video Gymnastics' Greatest Stars. Mukhina was fond of horses and liked riding before her accident, and she also enjoyed ballet and animated cartoons. After her injury, she continued to watch gymnastics competitions. Near the end of her life, she became religious.

She was cared for by her grandmother and, after 2000, by Elena Gurina, a former gymnast who had once performed with Mukhina.

=== Legacy ===
After Mukhina's paralysis and several other close calls with other Olympic-eligible female gymnasts, the Thomas salto was removed from the Code of Points as an allowed skill for women. It remained an allowed skill for men until 2017 when it was also removed from the Code of Points.

In late July 2021, many people compared Mukhina with Simone Biles, in defense of Biles' decision to pull out of the 2020 Tokyo Olympics while citing health concerns.

== Death ==
Mukhina was ill the last year of her life. She died on 22 December 2006 (aged 46), reportedly of heart failure.

As a tribute, sports magazine Sovetsky Sport dedicated the cover of its Christmas 2006 issue to her.

== Competitive history ==
Year	Event	Team	AA	VT	UB	BB	FX
1975	Schoolchildren's Spartakiade	1st place, gold medalist(s)					
1976	All-Union School Spartakiade		1st place, gold medalist(s)	1st place, gold medalist(s)			1st place, gold medalist(s)
1976	Junior USSR Championships		1st place, gold medalist(s)		1st place, gold medalist(s)	2nd place, silver medalist(s)	1st place, gold medalist(s)
1976	URS-TCH Dual Meet	1st place, gold medalist(s)		5			5
1976	USSR Championships		8				
1976	USSR Cup			12			
1977	All-Union Youth Sports Games	3rd place, bronze medalist(s)			1st place, gold medalist(s)		1st place, gold medalist(s)
1977	European Championships		2nd place, silver medalist(s)	3rd place, bronze medalist(s)	1st place, gold medalist(s)	1st place, gold medalist(s)	1st place, gold medalist(s)
1977	Moscow News		3rd place, bronze medalist(s)	5	4		3rd place, bronze medalist(s)
1977	Paris Grand Prix		11	1st place, gold medalist(s)	2nd place, silver medalist(s)		
1977	USSR Championships		2nd place, silver medalist(s)		3rd place, bronze medalist(s)		1st place, gold medalist(s)
1977	USSR Cup		1st place, gold medalist(s)				
1977	World Cup		5			1st place, gold medalist(s)	1st place, gold medalist(s)
1978	Moscow News		1st place, gold medalist(s)	3rd place, bronze medalist(s)	1st place, gold medalist(s)	2nd place, silver medalist(s)	1st place, gold medalist(s)
1978	FRA-USSR-BUL Meet	1st place, gold medalist(s)	3rd place, bronze medalist(s)				
1978	USSR Championships		1st place, gold medalist(s)		1st place, gold medalist(s)	5	3rd place, bronze medalist(s)
1978	USSR Cup		4				
1978	World Championships	1st place, gold medalist(s)	1st place, gold medalist(s)		2nd place, silver medalist(s)	2nd place, silver medalist(s)	1st place, gold medalist(s)
1979
1979	European Championships		4	4	1st place, gold medalist(s)		2nd place, silver medalist(s)
1979	USSR Championships		14	5	1st place, gold medalist(s)		
1979	USSR Spartakiade		18				
1980	USSR Cup		14				

== Eponymous skills ==
Mukhina has two eponymous skills listed in the Code of Points.

Apparatus	Name	Description	Difficulty (Note: Valid for the 2025–2028 Code of Points)
Floor exercise	Mukhina	Double salto bwd tucked with 1/1 turn (360°)	E (0.5)
Uneven bars	Mukhina	Hip circle hecht with back tucked salto	D (0.4)

== See also ==
- Yelena Shushunova, a Russian gymnast who executed the Thomas Salto in the 1987 European Gymnastics Championships
- Julissa Gomez, an American gymnast paralyzed in a vaulting accident at a 1988 meet in Japan while attempting the difficult-to-master Yurchenko vault. She later died of her injury.
- Christy Henrich, an American gymnast who was told by an international gymnastics judge in 1989 to lose weight and pushed by coaches to lose weight while continuing to train until constant dieting led to her eventual death from complications of anorexia nervosa less than five years later.
- Sang Lan, a Chinese gymnast paralyzed from the chest down after crashing a vault timer at the 1998 Goodwill Games in New York. She advocates for disabled people in China. A Chinese miniseries was produced about her life, starring fellow gymnast Mo Huilan.
