= Gymnastics at the 1980 Summer Olympics – Women's floor =

Women's floor at the Games of the XXII Olympiad
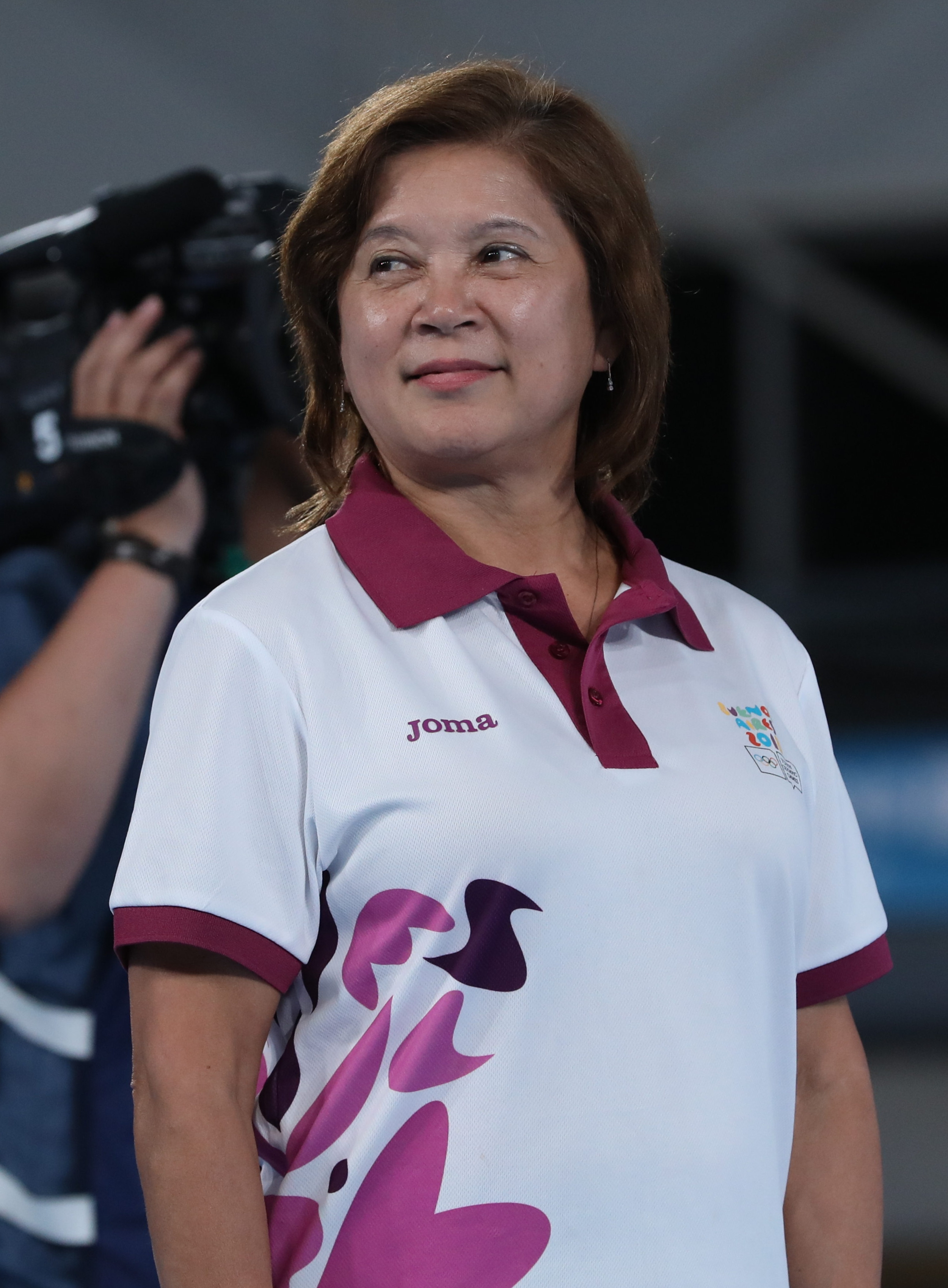
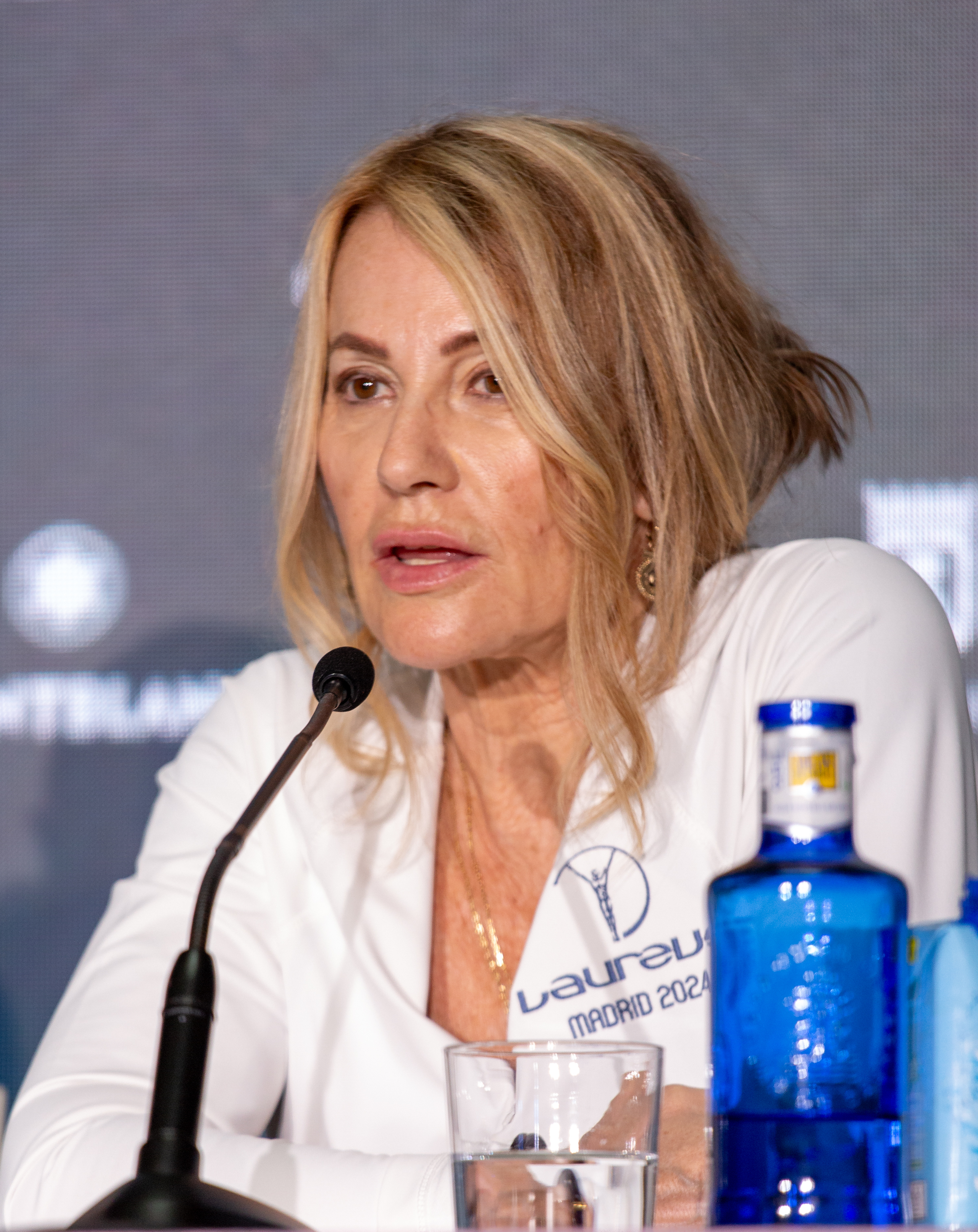
- Nellie Kim (2018) Nadia Comăneci (2024)

Medalists
1st place, gold medalist(s)		Nellie Kim	Soviet Union
1st place, gold medalist(s)		Nadia Comăneci	Romania
2nd place, silver medalist(s)		not awarded	
3rd place, bronze medalist(s)		Natalia Shaposhnikova	Soviet Union
3rd place, bronze medalist(s)		Maxi Gnauck	East Germany

These are the results of the women's floor competition, one of six events for female competitors in artistic gymnastics at the 1980 Summer Olympics in Moscow. The qualification and final rounds took place on July 21, 23 and 25th at the Sports Palace of the Central Lenin Stadium.

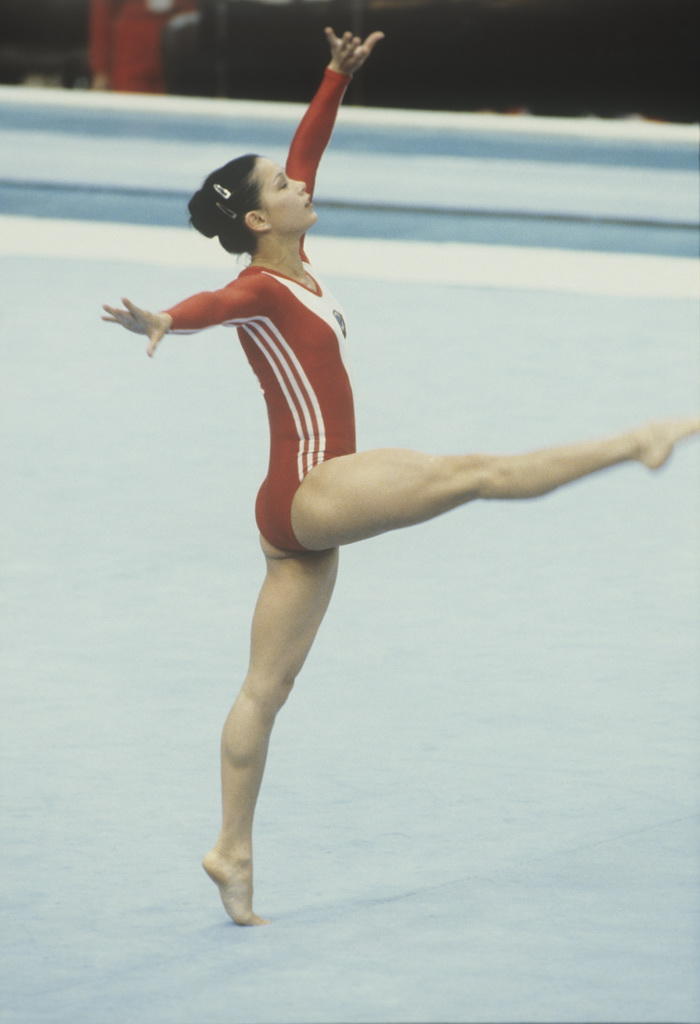
Nellie Kim during her gold medal performance.

== Results ==
=== Qualification ===
Sixty-two gymnasts competed in the compulsory and optional rounds on July 21 and 23. The six highest scoring gymnasts advanced to the final on July 25. Each country was limited to two competitors in the final. Half of the points earned by each gymnast during both the compulsory and optional rounds carried over to the final. This constitutes the "prelim" score.

=== Final ===
Rank	Gymnast	C	O	Prelim	Final	Total
Gold medal	Nellie Kim (URS)	9.900	9.950	9.925	9.950	19.875
Gold medal	Nadia Comăneci (ROU)	9.950	9.900	9.925	9.950	19.875
Bronze medal	Natalia Shaposhnikova (URS)	9.950	9.900	9.925	9.900	19.825
Bronze medal	Maxi Gnauck (GDR)	9.900	9.950	9.925	9.900	19.825
5	Emilia Eberle (ROU)	9.900	9.900	9.900	9.850	19.750
6	Jana Labakova (TCH)	9.850	9.900	9.875	9.850	19.725

Preceded by Gymnastics at the 1976 Summer Olympics – Women's floor	Women's Floor Exercise; 1980	Succeeded by Gymnastics at the 1984 Summer Olympics – Women's floor
