= 1975 European Women's Artistic Gymnastics Championships =

10th European Women's Artistic Gymnastics Championships
- Location: Skien, Norway
- Dates: 3–4 May 1975

The 1975 European Women's Artistic Gymnastics Championships took place in Skien, Norway. It was the 10th edition of the competition, which started in 1957. This was Nadia Comăneci's international breakthrough.

== Medalists ==
Event	Gold	Silver	Bronze
Seniors
All-around	Nadia Comăneci (ROU)	Nellie Kim (URS)	Annelore Zinke (GDR)
Vault	Nadia Comăneci (ROU)	Richarda Schmeißer (GDR)	Alina Goreac (ROU); Nellie Kim (URS)
Uneven bars	Nadia Comăneci (ROU)	Annelore Zinke (GDR)	Nellie Kim (URS)
Balance beam	Nadia Comăneci (ROU)	Nellie Kim (URS)	Alina Goreac (ROU)
Floor	Nellie Kim (URS)	Nadia Comăneci (ROU)	Ludmilla Tourischeva (URS)

== Results ==
=== All-around ===
Rank	Gymnast	Vault (gymnastics)	Uneven bars	Balance beam	Floor (gymnastics)	Total
1st place, gold medalist(s)	Nadia Comăneci (ROU)	9.700	9.750	9.750	9.650	38.850
2nd place, silver medalist(s)	Nellie Kim (URS)	9.550	9.700	9.550	9.700	38.500
3rd place, bronze medalist(s)	Annelore Zinke (GDR)	9.400	9.750	9.400	9.400	37.950
4	Richarda Schmeißer (GDR)	9.500	9.600	9.400	9.400	37.900
4	Ludmilla Tourischeva (URS)	9.500	9.350	9.250	9.800	37.900
6	Alina Goreac (ROU)	9.450	9.350	9.500	9.350	37.650
7	Eva Kralova (TCH)	8.800	9.400	9.400	9.300	36.900
8	Márta Egervári (HUN)	9.350	9.400	9.000	9.100	36.850
9	Drahomíra Smolíková (TCH)	8.950	9.200	9.250	9.200	36.600
10	Krisztina Medveczky (HUN)	9.350	9.000	8.900	9.100	36.350
11	Judyta Krawieczek (POL)	8.650	8.800	9.150	9.000	35.600
12	Unni Holmen (NOR)	8.900	8.900	8.750	9.000	35.550
13	Lucja Matraszek (POL)	8.850	8.700	9.050	8.900	35.500
14	Angela Mayer (FRG)	8.950	8.800	8.850	8.850	35.450
15	Jeannette van Ravenstijn (NED)	8.800	9.200	8.800	8.550	35.350
16	Uta Schorn (FRG)	8.700	8.900	8.900	8.750	35.250
17	Joëlle De Keukeleire (BEL)	8.950	8.700	8.750	8.800	35.200
18	Stefania Bucci (ITA)	8.800	8.900	8.700	8.550	34.950
18	Avril Lennox (GBR)	8.950	8.750	8.700	8.550	34.950
20	Nadine Audin (FRA)	8.900	8.850	8.450	8.700	34.900
21	Joke Kos (NED)	8.750	9.050	8.400	8.650	34.850
22	Monique Freres (BEL)	8.900	8.750	8.450	8.650	34.750
23	Suzanne Lundvall (SWE)	8.850	8.700	8.550	8.600	34.700
23	Chantal Seggiaro (FRA)	9.200	8.500	8.450	8.550	34.700
25	Elisa Cabello (ESP)	8.700	8.850	8.500	8.550	34.600
25	Jill Schau (NOR)	8.800	8.300	8.750	8.750	34.600
27	Maya Blagoeva (BUL)	8.800	8.550	8.400	8.700	34.450
27	Hanne Etienne (SUI)	8.850	8.850	8.150	8.600	34.450
27	Ella Widmer (SUI)	8.800	8.650	8.650	8.350	34.450
30	Serenella Codato (ITA)	8.650	8.400	8.700	8.600	34.350
30	Monica Costa (SMR)	8.850	8.450	8.500	8.550	34.350
32	Nina Kostova (BUL)	8.850	8.750	7.900	8.700	34.200
33	Auli Jarvenpaa (FIN)	8.600	8.550	8.450	8.550	34.150
34	Leslie Bartlett (GBR)	8.450	8.850	8.200	8.600	34.100
35	Dolores Tello (ESP)	8.750	8.600	8.150	8.450	33.950
36	Lorella Stefanelli (SMR)	8.750	8.500	7.800	8.300	33.350
37	Sabine Gratt (AUT)	8.350	8.650	7.950	8.200	33.150
38	Marjut Palmroos (FIN)	8.350	8.300	8.350	8.000	33.000
39	Eva Kuttner (AUT)	8.600	8.300	7.950	8.000	32.850

=== Vault ===
Rank	Gymnast	Score
1st place, gold medalist(s)	Nadia Comăneci (ROU)	19.500
2nd place, silver medalist(s)	Richarda Schmeißer (GDR)	19.100
3rd place, bronze medalist(s)	Alina Goreac (ROU)	19.000
3rd place, bronze medalist(s)	Nellie Kim (URS)	19.000
5	Ludmilla Tourischeva (URS)	18.950
5	Annelore Zinke (GDR)	18.950

=== Uneven bars ===
Rank	Gymnast	Score
1st place, gold medalist(s)	Nadia Comăneci (ROU)	19.650
2nd place, silver medalist(s)	Annelore Zinke (GDR)	19.550
3rd place, bronze medalist(s)	Nellie Kim (URS)	19.500
4	Richarda Schmeißer (GDR)	19.300
5	Eva Kralova (TCH)	18.300
6	Márta Egervári (HUN)	17.950

=== Balance beam ===
Rank	Gymnast	Score
1st place, gold medalist(s)	Nadia Comăneci (ROU)	19.500
2nd place, silver medalist(s)	Nellie Kim (URS)	19.150
3rd place, bronze medalist(s)	Alina Goreac (ROU)	19.000
4	Richarda Schmeißer (GDR)	18.850
5	Annelore Zinke (GDR)	18.250
6	Eva Kralova (TCH)	17.950

=== Floor ===
Rank	Gymnast	Score
1st place, gold medalist(s)	Nellie Kim (URS)	19.550
2nd place, silver medalist(s)	Nadia Comăneci (ROU)	19.400
3rd place, bronze medalist(s)	Ludmilla Tourischeva (URS)	19.350
4	Alina Goreac (ROU)	18.850
4	Richarda Schmeißer (GDR)	18.850
6	Annelore Zinke (GDR)	18.600
