= Nadia Comăneci =

Romanian gymnast (born 1961)

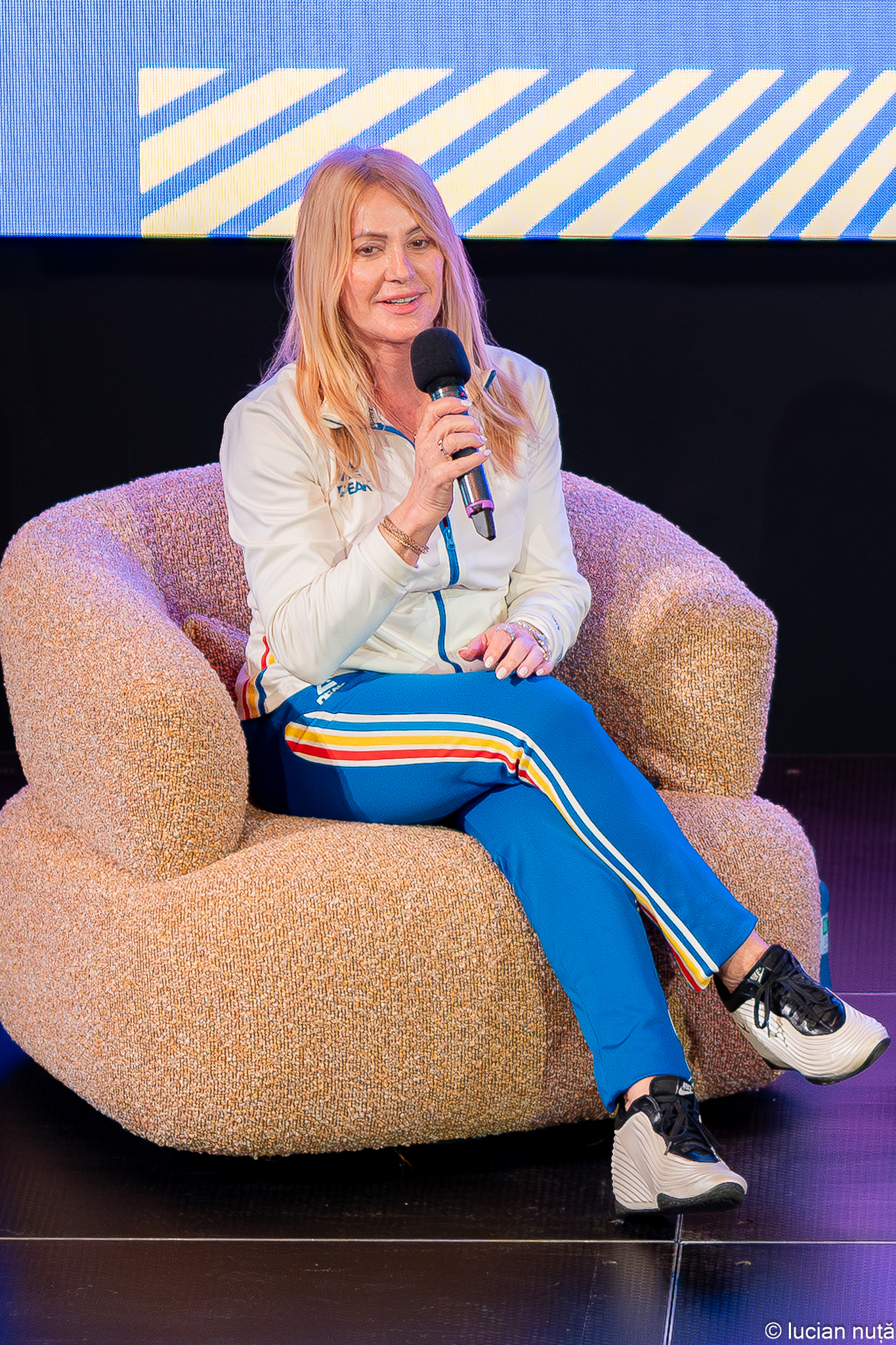
- Comăneci in 2026

Personal information
- Full name: Nadia Elena Comăneci
- Nickname: Nana
- Born: November 12, 1961 (age 65) Onești, Romanian People's Republic
- Height: 5 ft 3 1/2 in (1.61 m)
- Spouse: Bart Conner (m. 1996)

Gymnastics career
- Discipline: Women's artistic gymnastics
- Country represented: Romania; (1970–1984)
- College team: Politehnica University of Bucharest
- Gym: National Training Center
- Former coaches: Béla Károlyi; Márta Károlyi
- Choreographer: Géza Pozsár
- Eponymous skills: Comăneci salto (uneven bars)
- Retired: May 7, 1984 (official)
Medal record
Representing Socialist Republic of Romania
Women's artistic gymnastics
| Event | 1st | 2nd | 3rd |
|---|---|---|---|
| Olympic Games | 5 | 3 | 1 |
| World Championships | 2 | 2 | 0 |
| World Cup Final | 2 | 1 | 0 |
| European Championships | 9 | 2 | 1 |
| Summer Universiade | 5 | 0 | 0 |
| Total | 23 | 8 | 2 |
Olympic Games
| Gold medal – first place | 1976 Montréal | All-Around |
| Gold medal – first place | 1976 Montréal | Uneven Bars |
| Gold medal – first place | 1976 Montréal | Balance Beam |
| Gold medal – first place | 1980 Moscow | Balance Beam |
| Gold medal – first place | 1980 Moscow | Floor Exercise |
| Silver medal – second place | 1976 Montréal | Team |
| Silver medal – second place | 1980 Moscow | Team |
| Silver medal – second place | 1980 Moscow | All-Around |
| Bronze medal – third place | 1976 Montréal | Floor Exercise |
World Championships
| Gold medal – first place | 1978 Strasbourg | Balance Beam |
| Gold medal – first place | 1979 Ft. Worth | Team |
| Silver medal – second place | 1978 Strasbourg | Team |
| Silver medal – second place | 1978 Strasbourg | Vault |
World Cup Final
| Gold medal – first place | 1979 Tokyo | Vault |
| Gold medal – first place | 1979 Tokyo | Floor Exercise |
| Silver medal – second place | 1979 Tokyo | Balance Beam |
European Championships
| Gold medal – first place | 1975 Skien | All-Around |
| Gold medal – first place | 1975 Skien | Uneven Bars |
| Gold medal – first place | 1975 Skien | Balance Beam |
| Gold medal – first place | 1975 Skien | Vault |
| Gold medal – first place | 1977 Prague | All-Around |
| Gold medal – first place | 1977 Prague | Uneven Bars |
| Gold medal – first place | 1979 Copenhagen | All-Around |
| Gold medal – first place | 1979 Copenhagen | Vault |
| Gold medal – first place | 1979 Copenhagen | Floor Exercise |
| Silver medal – second place | 1975 Skien | Floor Exercise |
| Silver medal – second place | 1977 Prague | Vault |
| Bronze medal – third place | 1979 Copenhagen | Balance Beam |
Summer Universiade
| Gold medal – first place | 1981 Bucharest | Team |
| Gold medal – first place | 1981 Bucharest | All-Around |
| Gold medal – first place | 1981 Bucharest | Uneven Bars |
| Gold medal – first place | 1981 Bucharest | Vault |
| Gold medal – first place | 1981 Bucharest | Floor Exercise |

Nadia Elena Comăneci Conner (Note: UK: /ˌkɒməˈnɛtʃ(i)/ KOM-ə-NETCH(-ee), US: /ˈkoʊməniːtʃ, ˌkoʊməˈniːtʃ/ KOH-mə-neech, -NEECH, Romanian: [ˈnadi.a koməˈnetʃʲ].) (née Comăneci; born November 12, 1961) is a Romanian retired gymnast. She is a five-time Olympic gold medalist, all in individual events. In 1976, at age 14, Comăneci was the first gymnast to be awarded a perfect score of 10.0 at the Olympic Games. At the same Games (1976 Summer Olympics in Montreal), she earned six more perfect 10s for events en route to winning three gold medals. At the 1980 Summer Olympics in Moscow, Comăneci won two more gold medals and achieved two more perfect 10s. During her career, Comăneci won nine Olympic medals and four World Artistic Gymnastics Championship medals.

One of the world's best-known gymnasts, Comăneci was praised for her artistry and grace, which brought unprecedented global popularity to the sport in the mid-1970s. Called "the most iconic gymnast of the 20th century" by El País, Comăneci was named one of the Athletes of the 20th century by the Laureus World Sports Academy. In 2024, the International Sports Press Association (AIPS) voted her as the best female gymnast of the past 100 years and the second best female athlete of all sports.

Comăneci has lived in the United States since 1989, when she defected from then-Communist Romania, before its revolution in December that year. Comăneci later worked with and married American Olympic gold-medal gymnast Bart Conner, their wedding held in Bucharest after the fall of the Communist regime and televised live in Romania.

== Early life ==
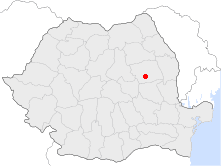
Onești (Gheorghe Gheorghiu-Dej between 1965 and 1989), the town where Comăneci was born

Nadia Elena Comăneci was born on November 12, 1961, in Onești, a small town in the Carpathian Mountains, in Bacău County, Romania, in the historical region of Western Moldavia. She was born to Gheorghe (1936–2012) and Ștefania Comăneci, and has a younger brother named Adrian. Her parents separated in the 1970s and her father later moved to Bucharest, the capital. Nadia and Adrian were raised in the Romanian Orthodox Church. In a 2011 interview, her mother said that she enrolled Comăneci into gymnastics classes because she was so full of energy and active as a child that she was difficult to manage. After years of top-level athletic competition, Comăneci graduated from Politehnica University of Bucharest with a degree in sports education, which qualified her to coach gymnastics.

== Gymnastics career ==
=== Early gymnastics career ===
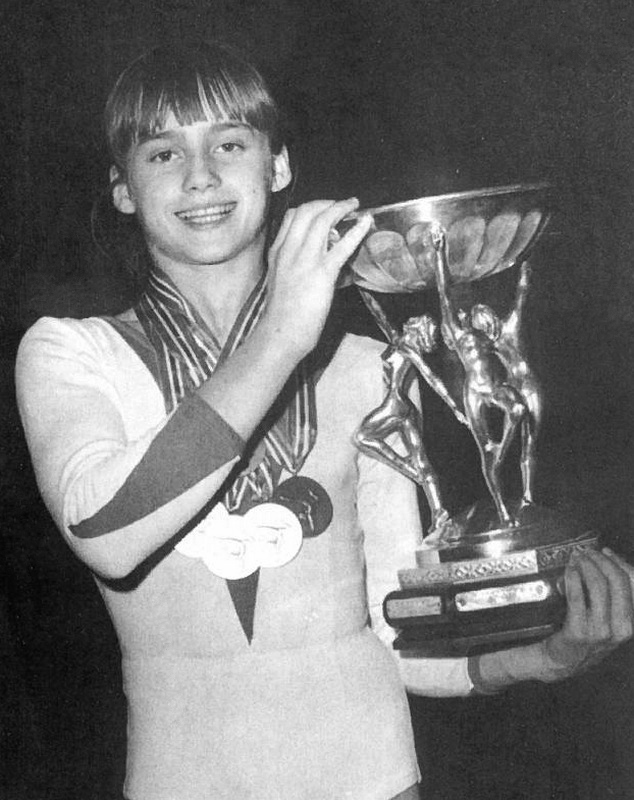
Comăneci during the European Championships in Skien, Norway, in 1975

Nadia began gymnastics in kindergarten with a local team called Flacără ("The Flame"), with coaches Duncan and Munteanu. At age six, she was chosen to attend Béla Károlyi's experimental gymnastics school, after Károlyi spotted her and a friend turning cartwheels in a schoolyard. Károlyi was looking for gymnasts that he could train from a young age. When recess ended, the girls quickly went inside and Károlyi went around the classrooms trying to find them; he eventually spotted Comăneci. The other girl, Viorica Dumitru, developed in a different direction and became one of Romania's top ballerinas.

By 1968, when she was seven, Comăneci started training with Károlyi. She was one of the first students at the gymnastics school established in Onești by Károlyi and his wife, Márta. As a resident of the town, Comăneci was able to live at home for many years; most of the other students boarded at the school.

In 1970, Comăneci began competing as a member of her home town team, and at age nine, became the youngest gymnast ever to win the Romanian Nationals. The following year, she participated in her first international competition, a dual junior meet between Romania and Yugoslavia, winning her first all-around title and contributing to the team gold. For the next few years, Comăneci competed as a junior in numerous national contests in Romania and dual meets with countries such as Hungary, Italy, and Poland. At age 11 in 1973, she won the all-around gold, as well as the vault and uneven bars titles, at the Junior Friendship Tournament (Druzhba), an important international meet for junior gymnasts.

Comăneci's first major international success came at age 13, when she nearly swept the board at the 1975 European Women's Artistic Gymnastics Championships in Skien, Norway. Comăneci won the all-around and gold medals in every event but the floor exercise, finishing in second place. She continued to enjoy success that year, winning the all-around at the 'Champions All' competition and coming first in the all-around, vault, beam, and bars at the Romanian National Championships. In the pre-Olympic test event in Montreal, Comăneci won the all-around and the balance beam golds as well as silvers in the vault, floor and bars. Accomplished Soviet gymnast Nellie Kim won the golds in those events and was one of Comăneci's greatest rivals for the next five years.

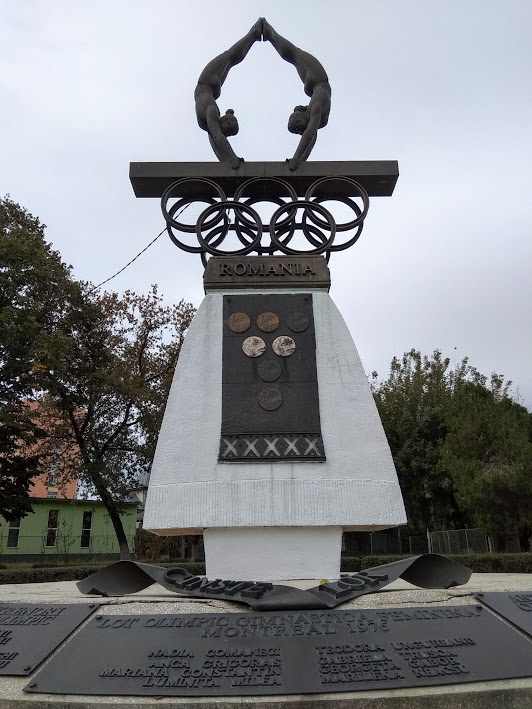
Monument dedicated to the Onești gymnastics school champions including Comăneci

=== 1976 ===
==== American Cup ====
In March 1976, Comăneci competed in the inaugural edition of the American Cup at Madison Square Garden in Manhattan. She received rare scores of 10, which signified a perfect routine without any deductions, for her vault in the preliminary stage and for her floor exercise routine in the final of the all-around competition, which she won. During this competition, Comăneci met American gymnast Bart Conner for the first time. While he remembered this meeting, Comăneci noted in her memoirs that she had to be reminded of it later in life. She was 14 and Conner was celebrating his 18th birthday. They both won a silver cup and were photographed together. A few months later, they participated in the 1976 Summer Olympics that Comăneci dominated, while Conner was a marginal figure. Conner later said, "Nobody knew me, and [Comăneci] certainly didn't pay attention to me."

==== 1976 Summer Olympics ====
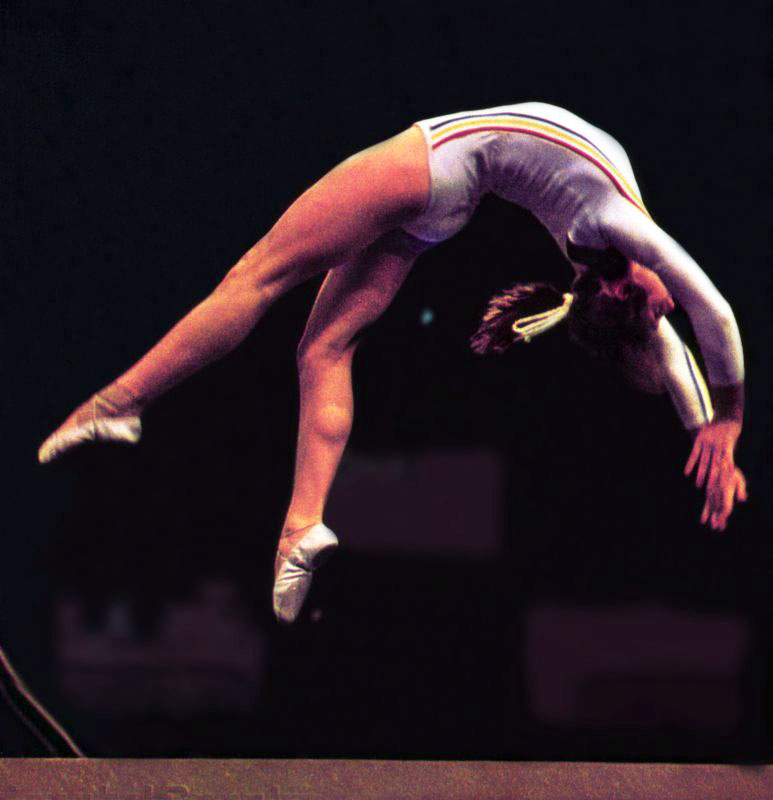
Comăneci on the balance beam at the 1976 Olympics

On July 18, 1976, Comăneci made history at the Montreal Olympics. During the team compulsory portion of the competition, she was awarded the first perfect 10 in Olympic gymnastics for her routine on the uneven bars. Omega SA, the official Olympics scoreboard manufacturer, had been led to believe that competitors could not receive a perfect 10, and had not programmed the scoreboard to display this score. Comăneci's perfect 10 thus appeared as "1.00", the only means by which the judges could indicate that she had received a 10.

At Montreal [Comăneci] received four of her seven 10s on the uneven bars. The apparatus demands such a spectacular burst of energy in such a short time—only 23 seconds—that it attracts the most fanfare. But it is on the beam that her work seems more representative of her considerable skill. She scored three of her seven 10s on the beam. Her hands speak there as much as her body. Her pace magnifies her balance. Her command and distance hush the crowd.

— Sports Illustrated, 1976

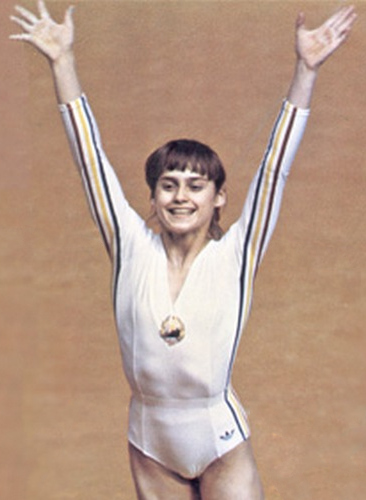
Comăneci at the 1976 Olympics

During the remainder of the Montreal Games, Comăneci earned six additional "10s". She won gold medals for the individual all-around, the balance beam and uneven bars. Comăneci also won a bronze for the floor exercise and a silver as part of the team all-around. Soviet gymnast Nellie Kim was her main rival during the Montreal Olympics; Kim became the second gymnast to receive a perfect 10, in her case for her performance on the vault. Comăneci took over the media spotlight from gymnast Olga Korbut, who had been the darling of the 1972 Munich Games.

Comăneci was the first Romanian gymnast to win the Olympic all-around title. She also holds the record as the youngest ever Olympic gymnastics all-around champion at age 14. The sport has since raised its age-eligibility requirements so that gymnasts must be at least 16 in the same calendar year of the Olympics in order to compete. When Comăneci competed in 1976, gymnasts had only to be 14 by the first day of the competition. Unless the age of eligibility is lowered, her record cannot be broken.

Comăneci was ranked as the BBC Overseas Sports Personality of the Year for 1976 and the Associated Press' 1976 "Female Athlete of the Year". Back home in Romania, she was awarded the Sickle and Hammer Gold Medal for her success, and Comăneci was named a Hero of Socialist Labor. She was the youngest Romanian to receive such recognition during the administration of Nicolae Ceaușescu.

===== "Nadia's Theme" =====
"Nadia's Theme" refers to an instrumental piece that became linked to Comăneci shortly after the 1976 Olympics. It was part of the musical score of the 1971 film Bless the Beasts and Children and originally titled "Cotton's Dream". It was also used as the title theme music for the American soap opera The Young and the Restless.

Robert Riger used it in association with slow-motion montages of Comăneci on the television program ABC's Wide World of Sports. The song became a top-10 single in the fall of 1976, and composers Barry De Vorzon and Perry Botkin Jr. renamed it as "Nadia's Theme" in Comăneci's honor. Comăneci never performed to "Nadia's Theme", however. Her floor exercise music was a medley of the songs "Yes Sir, That's My Baby" and "Jump in the Line", arranged for piano.

=== 1977–1979 ===
Comăneci successfully defended her European all-around title at the championship competition in 1977. When questions were raised at the competition about the scoring, Ceaușescu ordered the Romanian gymnasts to return home. The team followed orders amid controversy and walked out of the competition during the event finals.

Following the 1977 Europeans, the Romanian Gymnastics Federation removed Comăneci from her longtime coaches, the Károlyis, and sent her to Bucharest on August 23 to train at the sports complex. Comăneci did not find this change positive and was struggling with bodily changes as she grew older. Her gymnastics skills suffered, and Comăneci was unhappy to the point of losing the desire to live. Comăneci competed in the 1978 World Championships in Strasbourg four inches taller and according to Washington Post 22 pounds heavier than she was in the 1976 Olympics. A fall from the uneven bars resulted in a fourth-place finish in the all-around behind Soviets Elena Mukhina, Nellie Kim, and Natalia Shaposhnikova. Comăneci did win the world title on beam, and a silver on vault.

After the 1978 "Worlds", Comăneci was permitted to return to Deva and the Károlyis' school. In 1979, Comăneci won her third consecutive European all-around title, becoming the first gymnast, male or female, to achieve this feat. At the World Championships in Fort Worth that December, Comăneci led the field after the compulsory competition. She was hospitalized before the optional portion of the team competition for blood poisoning, which had resulted from a cut in her wrist from her metal grip buckle. Against doctors' orders, she left the hospital and competed on the beam, where she scored a 9.95. Her performance helped give the Romanians their first team gold medal. After her performance, Comăneci spent several days recovering in All Saints Hospital. She had to undergo a minor surgical procedure for the infected hand, which had developed an abscess.

=== 1980–1984 ===
==== 1980 Summer Olympics ====
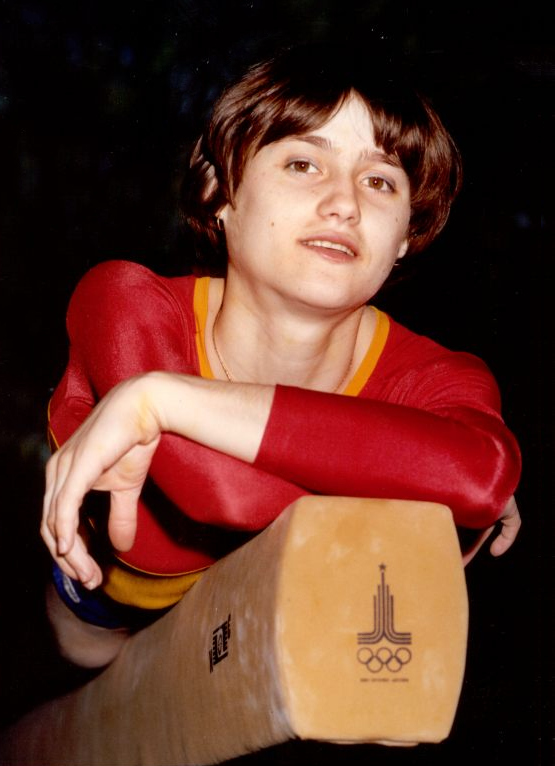
Comăneci in Moscow in 1980

Comăneci was chosen to participate in the 1980 Summer Olympics in Moscow. As a result of the Soviet invasion of Afghanistan, President Jimmy Carter declared that the United States would boycott the Olympics (several other countries also participated in the boycott, though their reasons varied). According to Comăneci, the Romanian government "touted the 1980 Olympic games as the first all-Communist Games." However, she also noted in her memoir, "in Moscow, we walked into the mouth of a lion's den; it was the Russians' home turf." She had a fall to the mat during the uneven bars event of the team competition and was judged with only 9.50, but later, she was twice awarded a perfect 10, first on the balance beam seconded by another one on uneven bars. She won two gold medals, one for the balance beam and one for the floor exercise (in which she tied with Soviet gymnast Nellie Kim, against whom she had also competed in the 1976 Montreal Olympics and other events). She also won two silver medals, one for the team all-around and one for individual all-around. Controversies arose concerning the scoring in the all-around and floor exercise competitions. As of the 2020 Summer Games, she is the only gymnast to defend her Olympic gold medal in the balance beam apparatus.

Her coach, Bela Károlyi, protested that she was scored unfairly. His protests were captured on television. According to Comăneci's memoir, the Romanian government was upset about Károlyi's public behavior, feeling that he had humiliated them. Life became very difficult for Károlyi from that point on.

==== "Nadia '81" ====
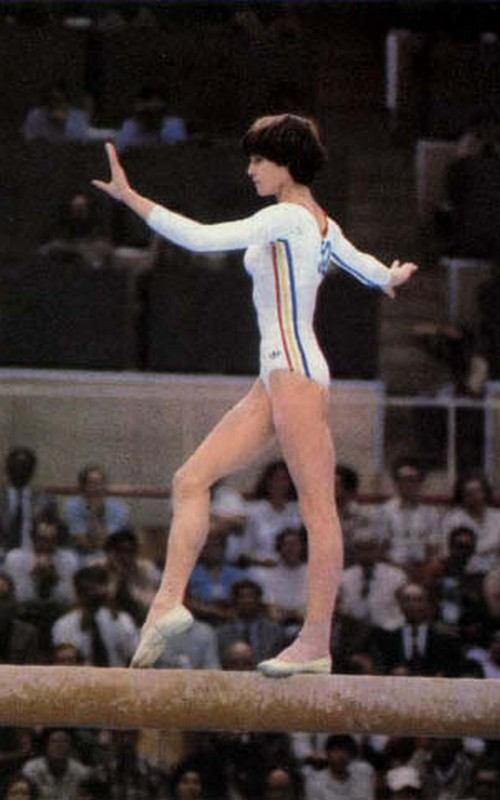
Comăneci on the balance beam, 1980

In 1981, the Gymnastics Federation contacted Comăneci and informed her that she would be part of an official tour of the United States named "Nadia '81" and her coaches Béla and Márta Károlyi would lead the group. During this tour, Comăneci's team shared a bus trip with American gymnasts; it was the third time she had encountered Bart Conner. They had earlier met in 1976. She later remembered thinking, "Conner was cute. He bounced around the bus talking to everyone—he was incredibly friendly and fun."

The Károlyis defected on the last day of the tour, along with the Romanian team choreographer Géza Pozsár. Prior to defecting, Károlyi hinted a few times to Comăneci that he might attempt to do so and indirectly asked if she wanted to join him. At that time, she had no interest in defecting, and said she wanted to go home to Romania. After the defection of the Károlyis, life changed drastically for Comăneci in Romania, as she could not have predicted. Officials feared that she would also defect. Feeling she was a national asset, they strictly monitored her actions, refusing to allow her to travel outside the country.

==== 1984 Summer Olympics ====
The government did allow Comăneci to participate in the 1984 Summer Olympics in Los Angeles as part of the Romanian delegation. Although a number of Communist nations boycotted the 1984 Summer Olympics in a tit-for-tat against the U.S.-led boycott of the Olympics in Moscow four years before, Romania chose to participate. Comăneci later wrote in her memoir that many believed Romania went to the Olympics because an agreement had been made with the United States not to accept defectors. But Comăneci did not participate in the Games as a member of the Romanian team; she served as an observer. She was able to see Károlyi's new protégé, American gymnast Mary Lou Retton, who won five medals, including one gold. The Romanian delegation did not allow her to talk with Károlyi and closely watched her the entire time.

==== Retirement ====
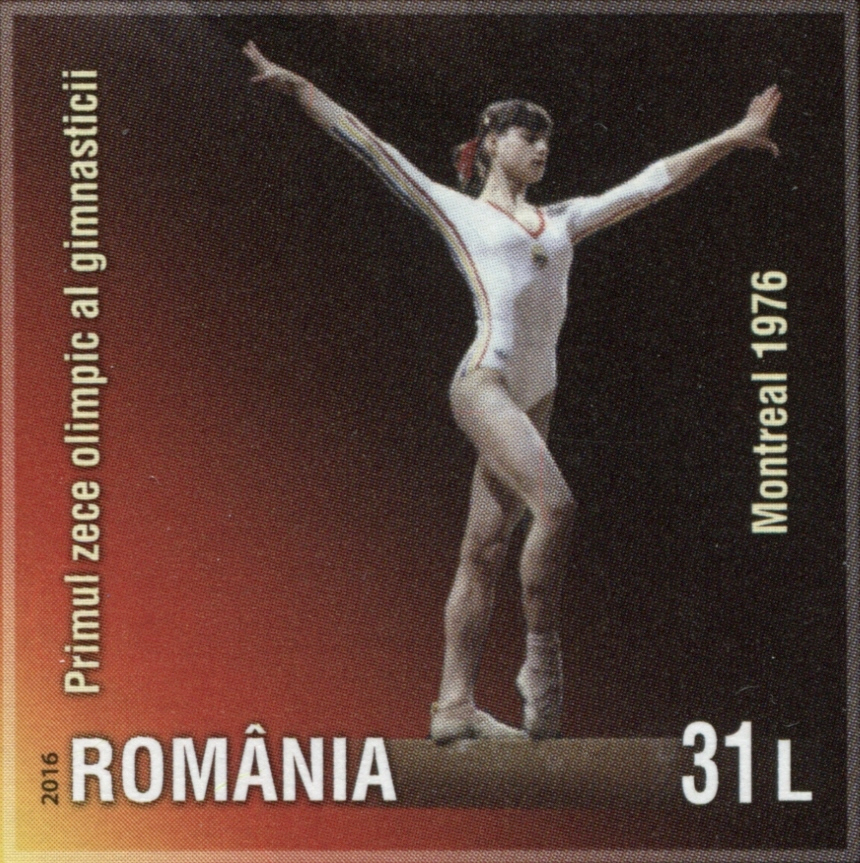
A 2016 Romanian postage stamp showing Comăneci on the balance beam at the 1976 Olympics in Montreal

The Romanian government continued to restrict Comăneci from leaving Romania, aside from a few select trips to Moscow and Cuba. Throughout her career, she had been subjected to round-the-clock surveillance at the hands of the Securitate secret police. She had started thinking about retiring a few years earlier, but her official retirement ceremony took place in Bucharest in 1984. It was attended by the chairman of the International Olympic Committee.

Comăneci later wrote in her memoir:

Life took on a new bleakness. I was cut off from making the small amount of extra money that had really made a difference in my family's life. It was also insulting that a normal person in Romania had the chance to travel, whereas I could not ... when my gymnastics career was over, there was no longer any need to keep me happy. I was to do as I was instructed, just as I'd done my entire life…. If Béla hadn't defected, I would still have been watched, but his defection brought a spotlight on my life, and it was blinding. I started to feel like a prisoner.

== Personal life ==
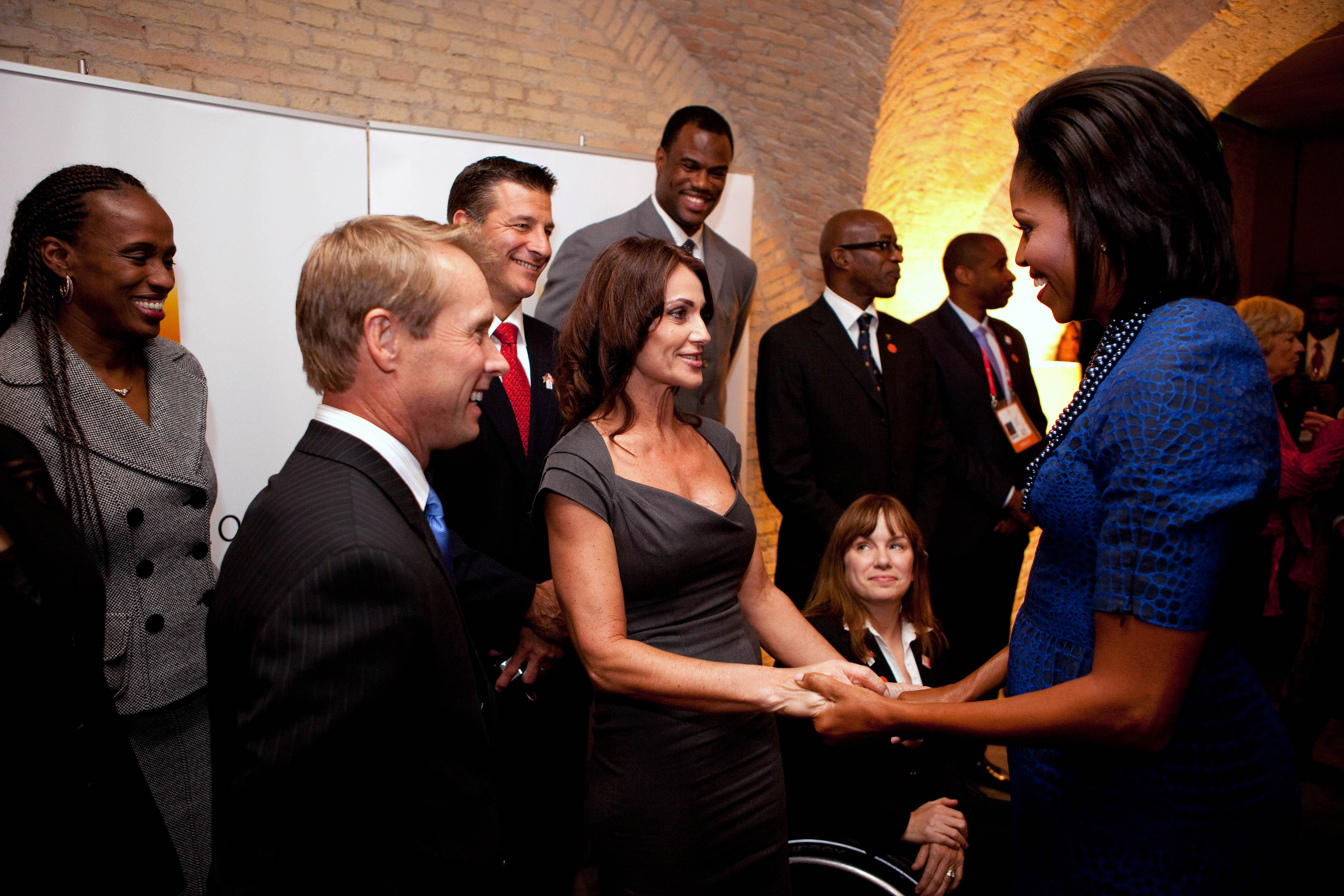
Comăneci and her husband Bart Conner meeting First Lady Michelle Obama, 2009

On the night of November 27, 1989, a few weeks before the Romanian revolution, Comăneci defected with a group of other Romanians, crossing the Hungary–Romania border around Cenad. They were guided by Constantin Panait, a Romanian who later became an American citizen after defecting. Their journey was mostly on foot and at night. They traveled through Hungary and Austria, and then a plane to the United States. She was settled briefly in South Florida, then in Los Angeles and later lived in Montreal, Canada for nearly two years.

Comăneci moved to Oklahoma in 1991 to help her friend Bart Conner, another Olympic gold medalist, with his gymnastics school. She lived with the family of Paul Ziert and eventually hired him as her manager. Comăneci and Conner were together for four years before they became engaged, marrying in 1996. She returned to Romania for their wedding, which was held in Bucharest. This was after the fall of the Communist regime and the establishment of a democratic Romania; the government welcomed her as a national hero. The wedding was televised live in Romania, and the couple's reception was held in the former presidential palace. Comăneci became a naturalized US citizen in 2001 while retaining her Romanian citizenship. In 2006, the couple's son was born.

On May 18, 1997, Comăneci and Conner guest-starred on the season 3 finale of Touched by an Angel, titled "A Delicate Balance", where they performed a brief floor exercise within a montage scene.

Since 1994, the Nadia Comăneci International Invitational has welcomed gymnasts ranging from USAG level 4 to level 10. The competition also hosted international elite competition in the mid-2010s, with Rebeca Andrade being a notable attendee in 2013 among others.

She was the featured speaker at the 50th annual Independence Day Naturalization Ceremony on July 4, 2012, at Thomas Jefferson's Monticello, the first athlete invited to speak in the history of the ceremony.

== Leadership roles ==
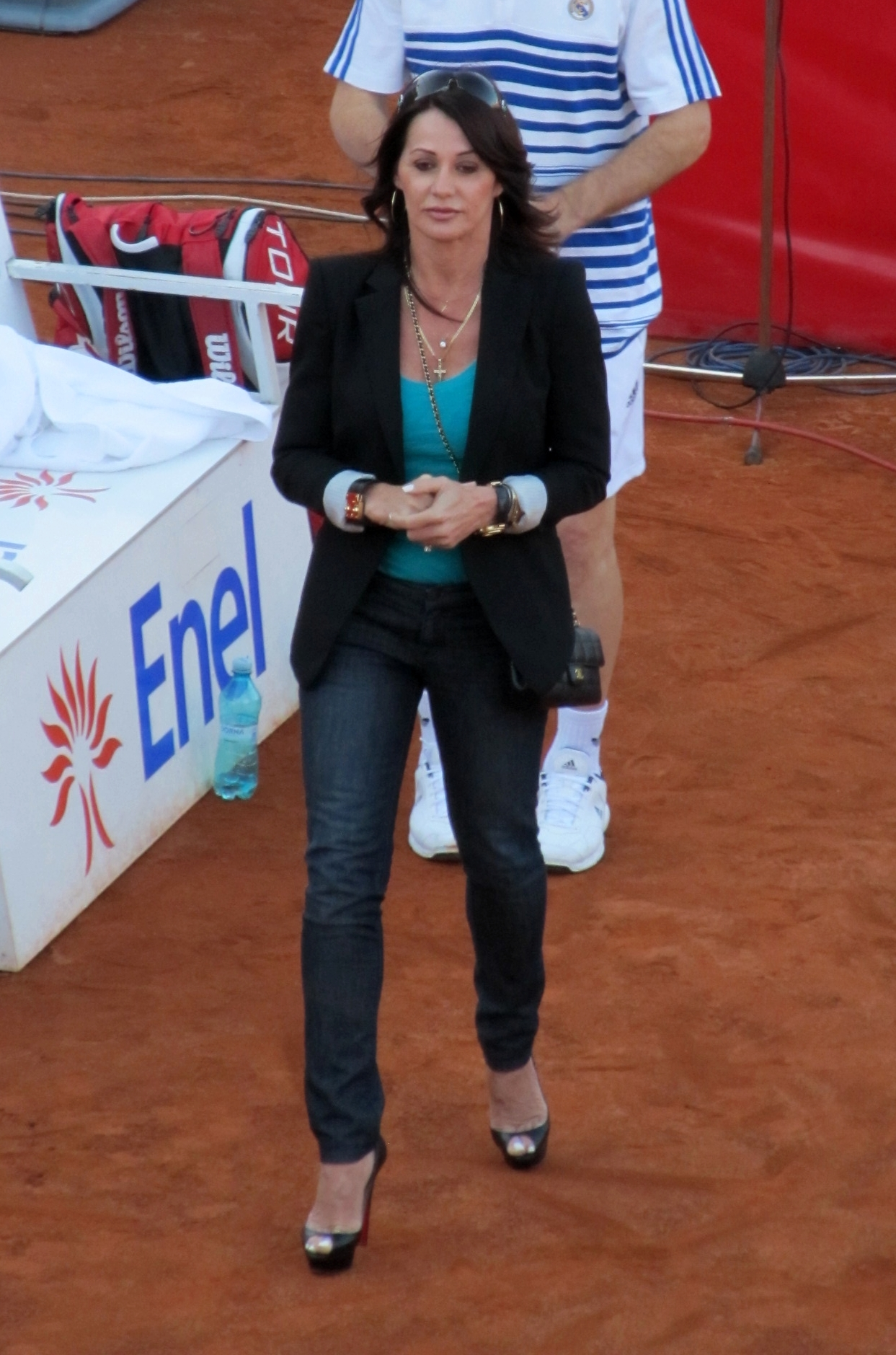
Comăneci at the BRD Năstase Țiriac Trophy, April 2012

Comăneci is a famous figure in the world of gymnastics; she serves as the honorary president of the Romanian Gymnastics Federation, the honorary president of the Romanian Olympic Committee, the sports ambassador of Romania, and as a member of the International Gymnastics Federation Foundation. She and Conner own the Bart Conner Gymnastics Academy, the Perfect 10 Production Company, and several sports equipment shops, and are the editors of International Gymnast magazine.

She is also still involved with the Olympic Games. During the 2004 Summer Olympics in Athens, one of her perfect-10 Montreal uneven bars routines was featured in a commercial for Adidas. In addition, both Comăneci and her husband Bart Conner provided television commentary for the 2008 Summer Olympics in Beijing. A few years later, on July 21, 2012, Comăneci, along with former basketball star John Amaechi, carried the Olympic torch to the roof of the O2 Arena as part of the torch relay for the 2012 Summer Olympics in London. Prior to the 2016 Summer Olympics in Rio de Janeiro, Comăneci appeared in a TIDE advertisement called "The Evolution of Power" with Simone Biles and three-time Olympic gymnast Dominique Dawes. She also offered daily analysis of the 2016 games (along with other Olympic champions such as Mark Spitz, Carl Lewis, and Conner), for the late-night show É Campeão, broadcast on Brazil's SporTV. On July 26, 2024, she participated in the opening ceremony of the 2024 Summer Olympics in Paris, alongside past Olympians Carl Lewis, Serena Williams, and Rafael Nadal, carrying the Olympic flame in the final stages of the torch relay up the river Seine to the Louvre museum on its way to the lighting of the Olympic cauldron in the Tuileries Garden.

In addition, Comăneci is highly involved in fundraising for a number of charities. She personally funded the construction and operation of the Nadia Comăneci Children's Clinic in Bucharest that provides low-cost and free medical and social support to Romanian children. In 2003, the Romanian government appointed her as an honorary consul general of Romania to the United States to deal with bilateral relations between the two nations. In addition, both Comăneci and Conner are involved with the Special Olympics.

To raise money for charity, Comăneci participated in the celebrity version of Donald Trump's reality show The Apprentice. Comăneci was a member of "The Empresario" team (all women), which lost to "The Hydra" team (all men) in the second episode. Trump responded to this loss by firing Comăneci, Comăneci later commented on her participation in the show, saying she "had great fun. I only did it because it was all for charity."

== Honors and awards ==
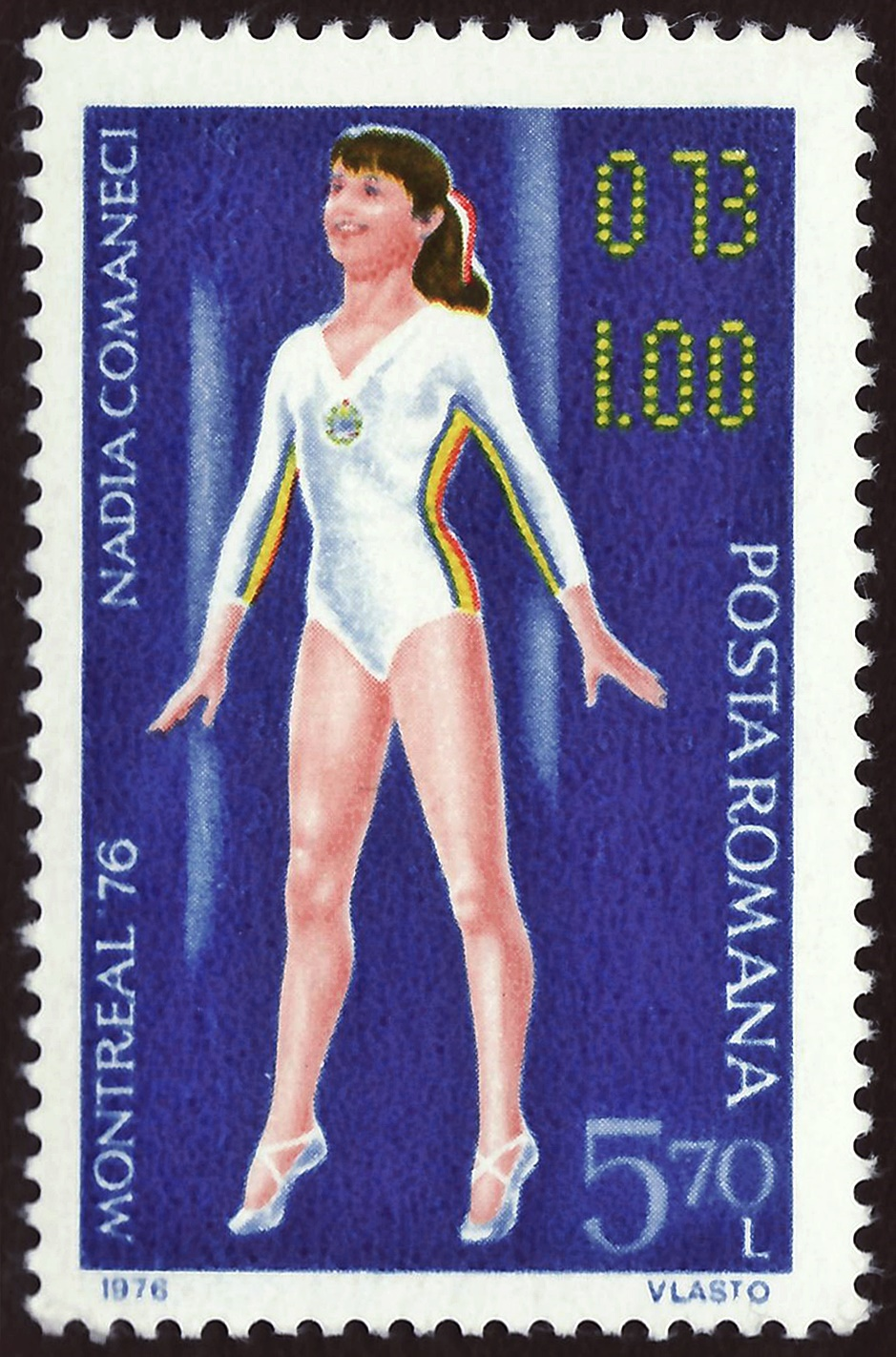
Comăneci in Montreal. Stamp of Romania, 1976

- 1975 and 1976: The United Press International Athlete of the Year Award
- 1976: Hero of Socialist Labour
- 1976: Associated Press Athlete of the Year
- 1976: BBC Overseas Sports Personality of the Year
- 1984: The Olympic Order (bronze)
- 1990: International Women's Sports Hall of Fame
- 1993: International Gymnastics Hall of Fame
- 1998: Marca Leyenda
- 1998: Flo Hyman Award
- 2004: The Olympic Order (silver)
- 2016: Great Immigrant Honoree: Carnegie Corporation of New York
- 2017: She was recognized as one of the BBC's 100 Women of 2017.
- 2017: an area in the Olympic Park in Montreal was renamed "Place Nadia Comaneci".
- 2021: Order of the Star of Romania, Grand Officer
- 2026: Laureus Lifetime Achievement Award
- 2026: Order of the Star of Romania, Grand Cross

== Skills ==
With her trademark verve, graceful delivery and unflickering precision, the 14-year-old from Romania set the bar to which future generations of gymnasts would aspire."

— "Lost Art: Powerhouse Physiques Winning Out over Spellbinding Grace", The Herald, 2015

Comăneci was known for her clean technique, innovative and difficult original skills, and her stoic, cool demeanor in competition. On the balance beam, she was the first gymnast to successfully perform an aerial cartwheel-back handspring series. She is also credited as being the first gymnast to perform a double-twist dismount. Her skills on the floor exercise included a tucked double back salto and a double twist.

Comăneci has two eponymous uneven bars skills listed in the Code of Points, the Comăneci salto and the Comăneci dismount.

| Apparatus | Name | Description | Difficulty (Note: Valid for the 2025–2028 Code of Points) |
|---|---|---|---|
| Uneven bars | Comăneci | Front support on high bar – cast with salto forward straddled to hang on high bar | E (0.5) |
| Uneven bars | Comăneci | Underswing with ½ turn (180°) to salto backward tucked or piked | C (0.3) |

== Competitive history ==
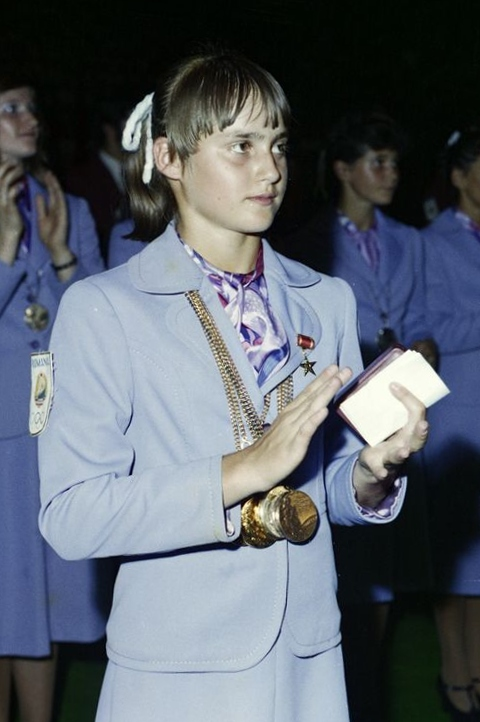
Comăneci wearing her medals in 1976

Competitive history of Nadia Comăneci at the junior level
| Year | Event | Team | AA | VT | UB | BB | FX |
|---|---|---|---|---|---|---|---|
| 1971 | Novice Romanian Championships | 1st place, gold medalist(s) | 4 | | | | |
| 1971 | Romanian Cup | | 1st place, gold medalist(s) | 1st place, gold medalist(s) | 1st place, gold medalist(s) | 1st place, gold medalist(s) | 1st place, gold medalist(s) |
| 1971 | Junior ROM-YUG Dual Meet | 1st place, gold medalist(s) | 1st place, gold medalist(s) | | | | |
| 1972 | Novice Romanian Championships | 1st place, gold medalist(s) | 2nd place, silver medalist(s) | | | | |
| 1972 | Junior Romanian Championships | 1st place, gold medalist(s) | 1st place, gold medalist(s) | | | | |
| 1972 | Romanian Cup | 1st place, gold medalist(s) | | | | | |
| 1972 | BUL-ROM Dual Meet | 1st place, gold medalist(s) | 2nd place, silver medalist(s) | | 1st place, gold medalist(s) | | 1st place, gold medalist(s) |
| 1972 | Friendship Tournament | 4 | | 6 | 1st place, gold medalist(s) | 1st place, gold medalist(s) | |
| 1972 | ROM-GDR Dual Meet | 1st place, gold medalist(s) | 3rd place, bronze medalist(s) | | | | |
| 1972 | ROM-RSFSR Dual Meet | 1st place, gold medalist(s) | 1st place, gold medalist(s) | | | | |
| 1972 | ROM-HUN Dual Meet | 1st place, gold medalist(s) | 1st place, gold medalist(s) | | | | |
| 1973 | International Championships of Romania | | 1st place, gold medalist(s) | 1st place, gold medalist(s) | 1st place, gold medalist(s) | 1st place, gold medalist(s) | 1st place, gold medalist(s) |
| 1973 | Friendship Tournament | 3rd place, bronze medalist(s) | 1st place, gold medalist(s) | 1st place, gold medalist(s) | 1st place, gold medalist(s) | | 3rd place, bronze medalist(s) |
| 1973 | ITA-ROM Dual Meet | 1st place, gold medalist(s) | 1st place, gold medalist(s) | | | | |
| 1973 | ROM-URS Dual Meet | 2nd place, silver medalist(s) | 1st place, gold medalist(s) | 1st place, gold medalist(s) | 1st place, gold medalist(s) | | 1st place, gold medalist(s) |
| 1973 | Romanian Team Championships | 1st place, gold medalist(s) | 1st place, gold medalist(s) | | | | |
| 1973 | Romanian Schools Championships | | 3rd place, bronze medalist(s) | | | | |
| 1974 | Junior Romanian Championships | | 1st place, gold medalist(s) | | | | |
| 1974 | ROM-POL-Denver Tri-Meet | 1st place, gold medalist(s) | 1st place, gold medalist(s) | | | | |

Competitive history of Nadia Comăneci at the senior level
| Year | Event | Team | AA | VT | UB | BB | FX |
|---|---|---|---|---|---|---|---|
| 1975 | Champions All | | 1st place, gold medalist(s) | | | | |
| 1975 | European Championships | | 1st place, gold medalist(s) | 1st place, gold medalist(s) | 1st place, gold medalist(s) | 1st place, gold medalist(s) | 2nd place, silver medalist(s) |
| 1975 | FRG-ROM Dual Meet | 1st place, gold medalist(s) | 1st place, gold medalist(s) | | | | |
| 1975 | Pre-Olympics | | 1st place, gold medalist(s) | 2nd place, silver medalist(s) | 1st place, gold medalist(s) | 3rd place, bronze medalist(s) | 2nd place, silver medalist(s) |
| 1975 | Romanian Championships | 1st place, gold medalist(s) | 1st place, gold medalist(s) | 1st place, gold medalist(s) | 1st place, gold medalist(s) | 1st place, gold medalist(s) | 2nd place, silver medalist(s) |
| 1975 | ROM-CAN Dual Meet | 1st place, gold medalist(s) | 1st place, gold medalist(s) | | | | |
| 1975 | ROM-ITA Dual Meet | 1st place, gold medalist(s) | 1st place, gold medalist(s) | | | | |
| 1976 | American Cup | | 1st place, gold medalist(s) | | | | |
| 1976 | Balkan Championships | 1st place, gold medalist(s) | 1st place, gold medalist(s) | 1st place, gold medalist(s) | 1st place, gold medalist(s) | 1st place, gold medalist(s) | 1st place, gold medalist(s) |
| 1976 | CAN-ROM Dual Meet | 1st place, gold medalist(s) | 1st place, gold medalist(s) | | | | |
| 1976 | Chunichi Cup | | 1st place, gold medalist(s) | | | | |
| 1976 | FRG-ROM Dual Meet | 1st place, gold medalist(s) | 1st place, gold medalist(s) | | | | |
| 1976 | GBR-ROM Dual Meet | 1st place, gold medalist(s) | 1st place, gold medalist(s) | | | | |
| 1976 | NED-ROM Dual Meet | 1st place, gold medalist(s) | 1st place, gold medalist(s) | | | | |
| 1976 | Olympic Games | 2nd place, silver medalist(s) | 1st place, gold medalist(s) | 4 | 1st place, gold medalist(s) | 1st place, gold medalist(s) | 3rd place, bronze medalist(s) |
| 1976 | Romanian Championships | | 1st place, gold medalist(s) | 1st place, gold medalist(s) | 1st place, gold medalist(s) | 1st place, gold medalist(s) | 2nd place, silver medalist(s) |
| 1976 | USA-ROM Dual Meet | 1st place, gold medalist(s) | 1st place, gold medalist(s) | | | | |
| 1977 | Balkan Championships | 1st place, gold medalist(s) | 1st place, gold medalist(s) | | | | |
| 1977 | ESP-ROM Dual Meet I | 1st place, gold medalist(s) | 1st place, gold medalist(s) | | | | |
| 1977 | ESP-ROM Dual Meet II | 1st place, gold medalist(s) | 1st place, gold medalist(s) | | | | |
| 1977 | European Championships | | 1st place, gold medalist(s) | 2nd place, silver medalist(s) | 1st place, gold medalist(s) | | |
| 1977 | FRA-ROM Dual Meet | 1st place, gold medalist(s) | 1st place, gold medalist(s) | | | | |
| 1977 | International Championships of Romania | | 1st place, gold medalist(s) | | 1st place, gold medalist(s) | 1st place, gold medalist(s) | 1st place, gold medalist(s) |
| 1977 | Orleans International | | 1st place, gold medalist(s) | | | | |
| 1977 | ROM-CAN Dual Meet | 1st place, gold medalist(s) | 1st place, gold medalist(s) | | | | |
| 1977 | USA-ROM Dual Meet | 1st place, gold medalist(s) | 1st place, gold medalist(s) | | | | |
| 1978 | ITA-ROM Dual Meet | 1st place, gold medalist(s) | 1st place, gold medalist(s) | | | | |
| 1978 | Milan International | | 1st place, gold medalist(s) | | | | |
| 1978 | World Championships | 2nd place, silver medalist(s) | | 2nd place, silver medalist(s) | 5 | 1st place, gold medalist(s) | 8 |
| 1979 | Balkan Championships | 1st place, gold medalist(s) | 1st place, gold medalist(s) | 1st place, gold medalist(s) | 1st place, gold medalist(s) | | 2nd place, silver medalist(s) |
| 1979 | Champions All | | 1st place, gold medalist(s) | | | | |
| 1979 | European Championships | | 1st place, gold medalist(s) | 1st place, gold medalist(s) | 4 | 3rd place, bronze medalist(s) | 1st place, gold medalist(s) |
| 1979 | International Championships of Romania | | 1st place, gold medalist(s) | | 1st place, gold medalist(s) | | |
| 1979 | World Championships | 1st place, gold medalist(s) | | | | | |
| 1979 | World Cup Final | | 4 | 1st place, gold medalist(s) | | 2nd place, silver medalist(s) | 1st place, gold medalist(s) |
| 1980 | International Championships of Romania | | 1st place, gold medalist(s) | | 1st place, gold medalist(s) | | |
| 1980 | ITA-ROM Dual Meet | 1st place, gold medalist(s) | 1st place, gold medalist(s) | | | | |
| 1980 | Olympic Games | 2nd place, silver medalist(s) | 2nd place, silver medalist(s) | 5 | | 1st place, gold medalist(s) | 1st place, gold medalist(s) |
| 1981 | Daciada | | 1st place, gold medalist(s) | | | | |
| 1981 | Summer Universiade | 1st place, gold medalist(s) | 1st place, gold medalist(s) | 1st place, gold medalist(s) | 1st place, gold medalist(s) | 1st place, gold medalist(s) | |

== Book and films ==
- Comăneci's 2004 memoir, Letters to a Young Gymnast, is part of the Art of Mentoring series by Basic Books.
- Katie Holmes directed a short 2015 documentary for ESPN about Comăneci entitled Eternal Princess that premiered at the Tribeca Film Festival.
- In 2016, Arte France produced a Pola Rapaport documentary about Comăneci entitled Nadia Comăneci, la gymnaste et le dictateur ("Nadia Comăneci: The Gymnast and the Dictator").
- In 1984, Comăneci was the subject of a biopic television film, Nadia. The film was developed without her involvement (although the content was described to her by others). She later stated publicly that the producers never made contact with her: "I sincerely don't even want to see it; I feel so badly about it. It distorts my life so totally."
- In 2012, Universal Pictures chose Comăneci to dub Granny Norma in Romanian in the animated movie The Lorax.
- In 2021, Stejărel Olaru published in Romanian a biographical volume, Nadia și Securitatea ("Nadia and the Securitate"), at Epica Publishing House.

== See also ==
- List of multiple Olympic gold medalists
- List of Olympic female gymnasts for Romania
- List of Olympic medal leaders in women's gymnastics
- List of multiple Olympic medalists at a single Games
- List of multiple Summer Olympic medalists

== Notes ==
Awards and achievements
| Preceded by Irena Szewińska | United Press International; Athlete of the Year; 1975, 1976 | Succeeded by Rosemarie Ackermann |
| Preceded by Arthur Ashe | BBC Overseas Sports Personality of the Year; 1976 | Succeeded by Niki Lauda |
| Preceded by Billie Jean King | Flo Hyman Memorial Award; 1998 | Succeeded by Bonnie Blair |
