= Nellie Kim =

Russian gymnast (born 1957)

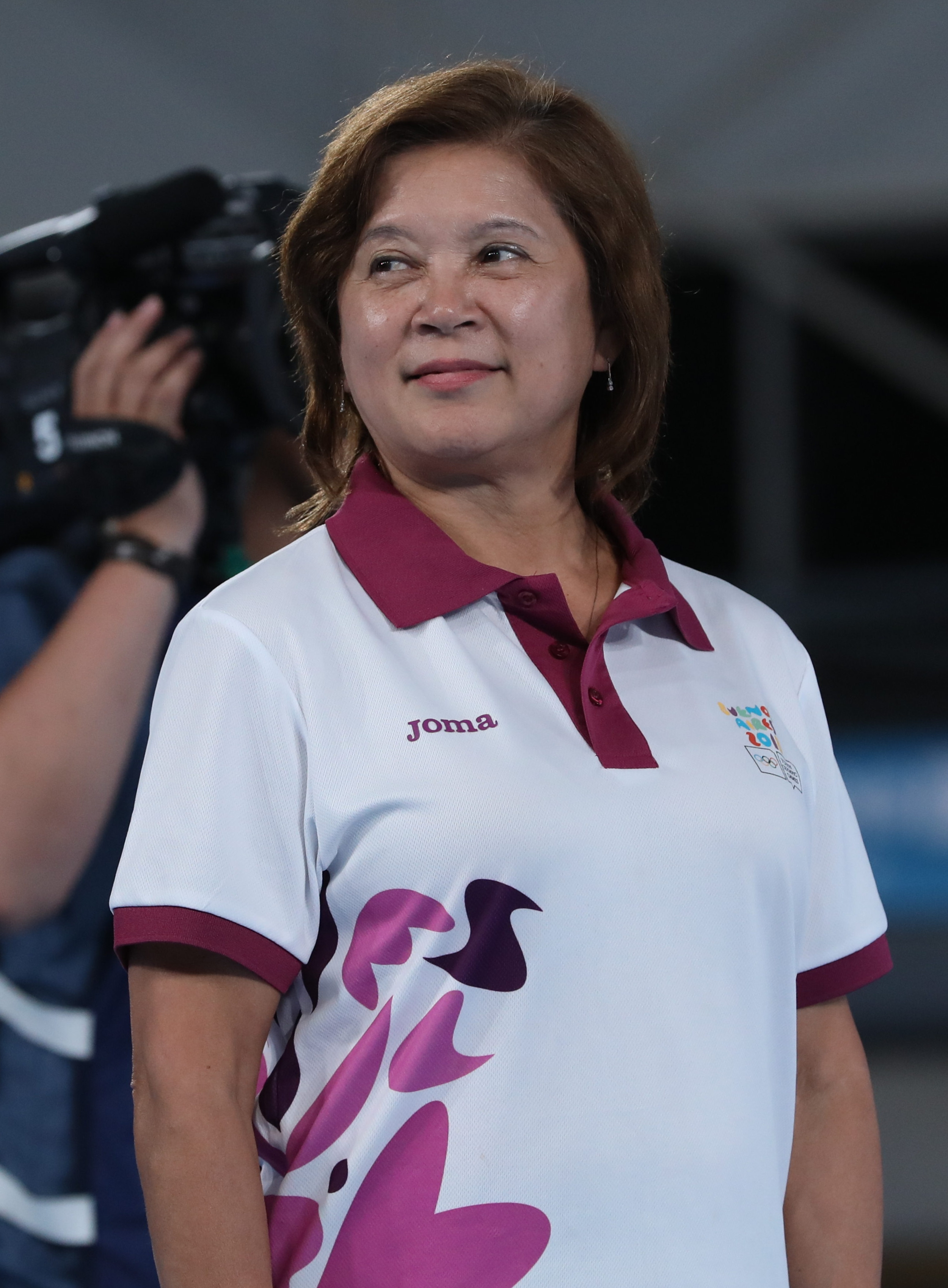
- Kim in 2018

Personal information
- Full name: Nellie Vladimirovna Kim
- Born: 29 July 1957 (age 69) Shurab, Tajik SSR, Soviet Union
- Height: 152 cm (5 ft 0 in)

Gymnastics career
- Discipline: Women's artistic gymnastics
- Country represented: Soviet Union
- Club: Spartak Shymkent (Kazakhstan); Soviet Armed Forces sports society Minsk (Byelorussia)
Medal record
Representing Soviet Union
Olympic Games
Gold medal – first place	1976 Montreal	Team
Gold medal – first place	1976 Montreal	Vault
Gold medal – first place	1976 Montreal	Floor
Gold medal – first place	1980 Moscow	Team
Gold medal – first place	1980 Moscow	Floor
Silver medal – second place	1976 Montreal	All-around
World Championships
Gold medal – first place	1974 Varna	Team
Gold medal – first place	1978 Strasbourg	Team
Gold medal – first place	1978 Strasbourg	Vault
Gold medal – first place	1978 Strasbourg	Floor
Gold medal – first place	1979 Fort Worth	All-around
Silver medal – second place	1978 Strasbourg	All-around
Silver medal – second place	1979 Fort Worth	Team
Silver medal – second place	1979 Fort Worth	Balance beam
Silver medal – second place	1979 Fort Worth	Floor
Bronze medal – third place	1974 Varna	Balance beam
Bronze medal – third place	1979 Fort Worth	Vault
World Cup Final
Silver medal – second place	1979 Tokyo	All-around
Bronze medal – third place	1979 Tokyo	Vault
Bronze medal – third place	1979 Tokyo	Balance beam
European Championships
Gold medal – first place	1975 Skien	Floor
Gold medal – first place	1977 Prague	Vault
Silver medal – second place	1975 Skien	All-around
Silver medal – second place	1975 Skien	Balance beam
Silver medal – second place	1977 Prague	Balance beam
Bronze medal – third place	1975 Skien	Vault
Bronze medal – third place	1975 Skien	Uneven bars
Bronze medal – third place	1977 Prague	All-around
Bronze medal – third place	1977 Prague	Floor

- Korean name
- Hangul: 김경숙
- Hanja: 金瓊淑
- RR: Gim Gyeongsuk
- MR: Kim Kyŏngsuk

Nellie Vladimirovna Kim (Russian: Нелли Владимировна Ким, also transliterated Nelli, born 29 July 1957) is a retired Soviet and Belarusian gymnast of Sakhalin Korean and Tatar descent who won three gold medals and a silver medal at the 1976 Summer Olympics in Montreal, and two gold medals at the 1980 Summer Olympics in Moscow. She was the second woman in Olympic history to earn a perfect 10 score and the first woman to score it on the vault and on the floor exercise, rivaling Nadia Comăneci, Ludmilla Tourischeva, and other strong competitors of the 1970s.

Kim worked for a long time as a coach, training several national teams, and judged many major international competitions. As president of the Women's Artistic Gymnastics Technical Committee, she coordinated the introduction of new rules in women's gymnastics, as provided by the new Code of Points, developed by the FIG in 2004–2005 and in effect since 2006. Her gymnastic appearances are remembered for "her strong feminine, temperamental and charismatic appeal".

== Early life ==
Nellie Kim was born in Shurab, Tajik SSR, Soviet Union. She is the daughter of a Sakhalin Korean father, Vladimir Kim, and a Tatar mother, Alfiya Safina. Later the family moved to Kazakh SSR, where her father worked in the Chimkent slate factory. At age 9, she entered Chimkent City Children and Youth Sports School 3 of the Spartak Sports Society. Two other children in the family, her younger brother Alexander and her sister Irina, also entered a gymnastics school and trained for some time. Alexander was harassed by his classmates in the secondary school for his small stature and retired from gymnastics in favor of boxing. Irina, whom Nellie considered more talented than she, retired because of the demands of the frequent training sessions.

Kim's trainers were Vladimir Baidin and his wife, Galina Barkova. Initially, she did not have the required flexibility of many of her fellow gymnasts, but was soon able to compensate with superior technique and the difficulty of her exercises. Kim excelled and quickly became one of the best in Soviet gymnastics.

One of Kim's earliest successes was her victory in the republican Spartak's competition, held in Chimkent in 1969. Nevertheless, a year later she was said to "have no future" by celebrated gymnast Larisa Latynina. After that verdict, Kim was close to leaving gymnastics but persevered with support from Baidin. At the 1971 Junior USSR Championships, her first national competition, she placed fifth in the all-around. Success in the national junior circuit, as well as senior national and international debuts, followed two years later. Kim won the all-around title and two more gold medals at the All-Union Youth Sports Games, placed eighth in the all-around and first on the uneven bars at the USSR Cup; she also won the prestigious Chunichi Cup in Japan. After a second-place finish at the USSR Cup in August 1974, Kim was added to the team roster for the World Championships, held in October, where she earned the gold medal in the team competition. Afterwards, and until 1980, she successfully competed in numerous top-level international events.

Kim's nickname among USSR teammates and team coaches was "Kimanellie," which she earned when a trainer Vladislav Rastorotsky called her very quickly: "Kim, Nellie, to the phone!"

== Olympics and World Championships ==
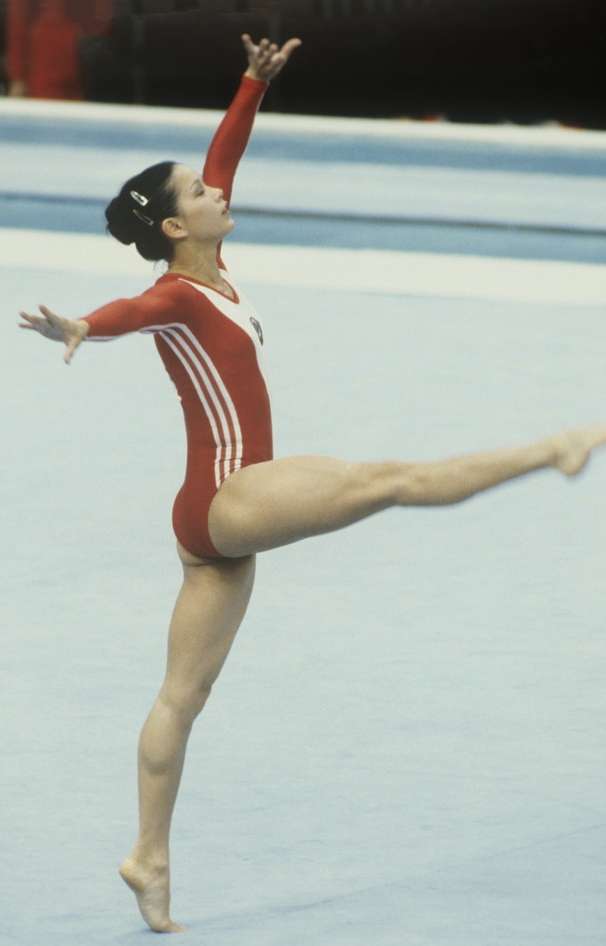
Nellie at the 1980 Summer Olympics

Nellie Kim became one of the main medal prospects for the upcoming Olympics and actual leader of the Soviet team after the 1975 Canadian Pre-Olympics Test competition. At the Test she placed second in the all-around to Nadia Comăneci, but won three golds in the event finals (vault, balance beam, floor exercise), while Comăneci won the remaining one on bars. Larisa Latynina, who had already changed her opinion about Kim earlier, described her gymnastics style as sparkling and cheerful. She also cited a comment by Canadian newspapers about Kim's performance: "There are moments, when a natural smile is more worth, than triumph". Kim also won the 1976 USSR Cup.

At the 1976 Summer Olympics, the rivalry between Nellie Kim and Nadia Comăneci became the focal point of the women's gymnastics competition. Kim's teammates Ludmilla Tourischeva and Olga Korbut, the Olympic champions of Munich, were overcome by the two rising stars in the battle for the gold. Kim won three gold medals, one in the team competition and two in the event finals: on the vault and floor exercise. Music for her floor routine, choreographed by Valentina Kosolapova, was a fiery Samba, and one of the elements was the double back salto, performed for the first time in Olympic women's events. Kim also won a silver medal in the all-around, receiving the perfect 10 for the Tsukahara vault with the full twist, which was also performed for the first time in Olympic history. She was praised for her feminine beauty and the flamboyant, graceful and intense style. Comaneci won the gold in the all-around, on bars and balance beam. Nellie's weak performance on the beam together with a lower preliminary score, led her to place second in the all-around, after Nadia.

After the 1976 Summer Olympics, Kim moved to the Byelorussian SSR (joining the Armed Forces sports society in Minsk) and represented her new club on the USSR team. Two years later Kim successfully competed at the World Championships. She won gold medals on the vault, floor exercise and in the team competition, and placed second in the all-around to Elena Mukhina, overcoming Nadia Comăneci. The greatest success came at the 1979 World Championships, where Kim became the all-around champion, beating Maxi Gnauck, Melita Ruhn and her teammate Maria Filatova. Her floor exercise routine, choreographed by Galina Savarina, was accompanied by a new piece of music, "The House of the Rising Sun" by Santa Esmeralda, which would also be used one year later at the Olympics.

In 1980, Kim won the all-around title at the USSR Championships and successfully competed in the Moscow Olympics, her last competitive performance. She tied for the gold medal on the floor with Nadia Comăneci after scoring 9.95 in that event finals, and won gold in the team competition. As of the 2020 Summer Games in Tokyo, she and Larisa Latynina are the only female gymnasts to defend their Olympic gold medal in the floor exercise event. After the Moscow Olympics, Kim appeared with a roster of other top-class gymnasts at Wembley Arena in January 1981 for a popular exhibition of gymnastic performances on floor and apparatus.

== Later life ==
After her competitive career ended, Nellie Kim worked as a coach and a judge. She coached the South Korean, Italian and Belarus national teams. In 1984, Kim became an International Brevet Judge and judged numerous international competitions, including European Championships, World Championships and Olympic Games. On one occasion, her judging license was suspended by the FIG for a time, after the 1990 World Cup, due to allegations of cheating and fixing scores. After her suspension ended, she was judging again at the Barcelona Games. Since 1993, she has served as President of the Judging Committee in Artistic Gymnastics of the Republic of Belarus.

Kim's first marriage was to fellow gymnast Vladimir Achasov, but the marriage did not last. She met her second husband, Soviet cyclist Valery Movchan, at the 1980 Olympics, in which he had also won a gold medal. Together they had a daughter (also named Nellie), born in the mid-1980s.

In 1996, Kim was elected to the Women's Artistic Gymnastics Technical Committee of the International Gymnastics Federation (FIG), and moved to Saint Paul, Minnesota soon afterwards.

In 1999, Kim was inducted into the International Gymnastics Hall of Fame.

At the FIG Congress of 22 October 2004 in Antalya, Kim was elected President of the Women's Artistic Gymnastics Technical Committee. She helped draft the 2006 changes to the Code of Points, ending the use of the perfect 10 and introducing uncapped scoring for gymnasts. Some of the main causes for the changes were judging scandals at the 2004 Summer Olympics involving Alexei Nemov and other gymnasts. FIG officials, including Kim and Bruno Grandi, believed one of the ways to prevent such scandals in the future, and make clean execution and artistry the main priorities, was a radical overhaul of the old Code.

The move was controversial among fans and athletes alike. Kim and other FIG officials pointed out that the changes were undertaken with the help and advice of FIG member federations and many judges, as had all previous codes. They also highlighted that the system would be tested on major international events before final adoption.

In a 2005 interview, Kim said that unlike her WAG TC President predecessor, Jackie K. Fie, she did not receive any salary from the federation of the country, represented by her in the FIG. And that she works for the FIG on the basis of pure enthusiasm.

In 2013, Kim was accused by Russian coaches of favoring American gymnasts, a view she vehemently refuted and criticized.

Kim was the subject of a half-hour National Film Board of Canada documentary Nelli Kim, co-directed by Georges Dufaux and Pierre Bernier, which was filmed at the 1976 Summer Games and released in 1978.

After the collapse of the Soviet Union, she took Belarusian citizenship. The pop singer Nelly Furtado was named after her.

== Eponymous skills ==
Kim has a total of seven eponymous skills in the Code of Points.

Apparatus	Name	Description	Difficulty (Note: Valid for the 2025–2028 Code of Points)	Added to the Code of Points
Vault	Kim	Handspring forward on - 1½ turn (540°) off	3.2	1974 World Championships
Vault	Kim	Tsukahara tucked with 1/1 turn (360°) off	3.8	1976 Olympic Games
Vault	Kim	Tsukahara stretched with 1/1 turn (360°) off	4.4	1978 World Championships
Balance beam	Kim	Gainer salto tucked 1/1 turn (360°) at end of beam	C	1976 Olympic Games
Balance beam	Kim	Free (aerial) cartwheel into salto backward tucked	E	1980 Olympic Games
Floor exercise	Kim	Double salto backward tucked	D	1976 Olympic Games
Floor exercise	Kim	Double salto backward stretched-piked	D	1978 World Championships

== Competition history ==
Year	Event	Team	AA	VT	UB	BB	FX
1971	Junior USSR Championships		5				
1972	Druzhba	1st place, gold medalist(s)					2nd place, silver medalist(s)
1972	Junior USSR-HUN Dual Meet	1st place, gold medalist(s)	2nd place, silver medalist(s)				
1972	Junior USSR Championships		2nd place, silver medalist(s)	1st place, gold medalist(s)	1st place, gold medalist(s)		
1972	USSR School Spartakiade		2nd place, silver medalist(s)				1st place, gold medalist(s)
1973	All-Union Youth Sports Games	1st place, gold medalist(s)	1st place, gold medalist(s)	3rd place, bronze medalist(s)	2nd place, silver medalist(s)	1st place, gold medalist(s)	
1973	Chunichi Cup		1st place, gold medalist(s)				
1973	Druzhba	1st place, gold medalist(s)	2nd place, silver medalist(s)	6	2nd place, silver medalist(s)		2nd place, silver medalist(s)
1973	USSR Cup		8		1st place, gold medalist(s)		
1974	Milk Meet		5				
1974	Riga International		2nd place, silver medalist(s)				
1974	USSR Championships		3rd place, bronze medalist(s)	2nd place, silver medalist(s)	2nd place, silver medalist(s)		
1974	USSR Cup		2nd place, silver medalist(s)				
1974	World Championships	1st place, gold medalist(s)	9			3rd place, bronze medalist(s)	
1975	Chunichi Cup		4				
1975	European Championships		2nd place, silver medalist(s)	3rd place, bronze medalist(s)	3rd place, bronze medalist(s)	2nd place, silver medalist(s)	1st place, gold medalist(s)
1975	Moscow News		1st place, gold medalist(s)	2nd place, silver medalist(s)	1st place, gold medalist(s)	1st place, gold medalist(s)	1st place, gold medalist(s)
1975	Pre-Olympics		2nd place, silver medalist(s)	1st place, gold medalist(s)	2nd place, silver medalist(s)	1st place, gold medalist(s)	1st place, gold medalist(s)
1975	JPN-USSR Dual Meet	1st place, gold medalist(s)	1st place, gold medalist(s)				
1975	USSR Championships		1st place, gold medalist(s)	2nd place, silver medalist(s)	1st place, gold medalist(s)	1st place, gold medalist(s)	1st place, gold medalist(s)
1975	USSR Cup		2nd place, silver medalist(s)				
1975	USSR Spartakiade		1st place, gold medalist(s)				
1976	Chunichi Cup		15				
1976	Tokyo Cup			1st place, gold medalist(s)		1st place, gold medalist(s)	1st place, gold medalist(s)
1976	USSR Cup	1st place, gold medalist(s)		1st place, gold medalist(s)	2nd place, silver medalist(s)	1st place, gold medalist(s)	
1976	Olympic Games	1st place, gold medalist(s)	2nd place, silver medalist(s)	1st place, gold medalist(s)			1st place, gold medalist(s)
1977
1977	European Championships	3rd place, bronze medalist(s)		1st place, gold medalist(s)		2nd place, silver medalist(s)	3rd place, bronze medalist(s)
1978	USSR Cup		16	2nd place, silver medalist(s)			
1978	World Championships	2nd place, silver medalist(s)	1st place, gold medalist(s)	1st place, gold medalist(s)			1st place, gold medalist(s)
1979	Athens International		1st place, gold medalist(s)	1st place, gold medalist(s)	2nd place, silver medalist(s)	1st place, gold medalist(s)	1st place, gold medalist(s)
1979	USSR Championships		5	2nd place, silver medalist(s)	2nd place, silver medalist(s)	4	1st place, gold medalist(s)
1979	USSR Spartakiade	1st place, gold medalist(s)	3rd place, bronze medalist(s)	1st place, gold medalist(s)	1st place, gold medalist(s)		1st place, gold medalist(s)
1979	World Championships	1st place, gold medalist(s)	2nd place, silver medalist(s)	3rd place, bronze medalist(s)	5	2nd place, silver medalist(s)	2nd place, silver medalist(s)
1979	World Cup	2nd place, silver medalist(s)		3rd place, bronze medalist(s)		3rd place, bronze medalist(s)	8
1980	USSR Championships	1st place, gold medalist(s)					
1980	Olympic Games	1st place, gold medalist(s)	5		6		1st place, gold medalist(s)

== See also ==
- List of multiple Olympic gold medalists
- List of top Olympic gymnastics medalists
- List of top medalists at the World Artistic Gymnastics Championships
- List of Olympic female gymnasts for the Soviet Union
