= Comăneci salto =

Manoeuvre on uneven bars

The Comăneci salto is a gymnastics manoeuvre on the uneven bars, developed primarily by Romanian gymnast Nadia Comăneci. It is listed as an E-rated element in the current Code of Points. To perform a Comăneci salto, the gymnast begins in a support position on the high bar and, casting away from it, performs a straddled front somersault, regrasping the same bar. In the 2006 FIG Code, the Comăneci salto remained one of the hardest manoeuvres point-wise, and retained the E rating.
