= Thomas salto =

Move in artistic gymnastics

The Thomas salto is an extremely difficult and dangerous move performed during the floor exercise in artistic gymnastics. It is named after American gymnast Kurt Thomas.

== Technical details ==
The Thomas salto consists of a 1½ salto backward in a tucked or piked position with 1½ twists or a 1½ salto backward in a layout (straight) position with 1½ twists, landing in a forward roll on the floor.

The move and other skills ending with a roll on the floor are effectively banned. It was removed from the Code of Points following several serious injuries, most notably the paralysis of Elena Mukhina in 1980. As of the 2017–2020 Code, "3/2 salto elements with reception by and then spring from the hands are not permitted," effectively banning the Thomas salto for all gymnasts.
