= Annelore Zinke =

German gymnast (born 1958)

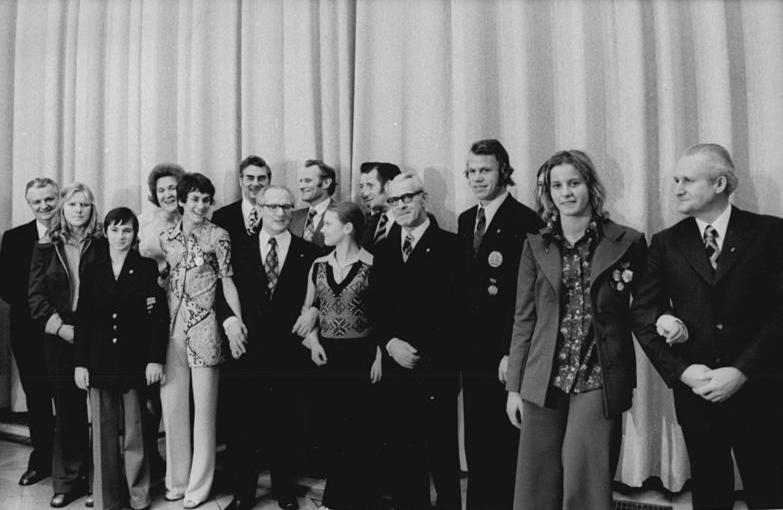
- Annelore Zinke (third from left) in 1974

Personal information
- Born: 10 December 1958 (age 67) Lauchhammer, Bezirk Cottbus, East Germany

Gymnastics career
Medal record
Women's artistic gymnastics
Representing East Germany
World Championships
Silver medal – second place	1974 Varna	Team
Gold medal – first place	1974 Varna	Uneven bars
European Championships
Bronze medal – third place	1975 Skien	All-Around
Silver medal – second place	1975 Skien	Uneven bars

Annelore Zinke (born 10 December 1958 in Lauchhammer, Bezirk Cottbus) is a German gymnast who competed for the SC Dynamo Berlin / Sportvereinigung (SV) Dynamo. She won many international competitions.
