= Gymnastics at the 1976 Summer Olympics – Women's floor =

Women's floor at the Games of the XXI Olympiad
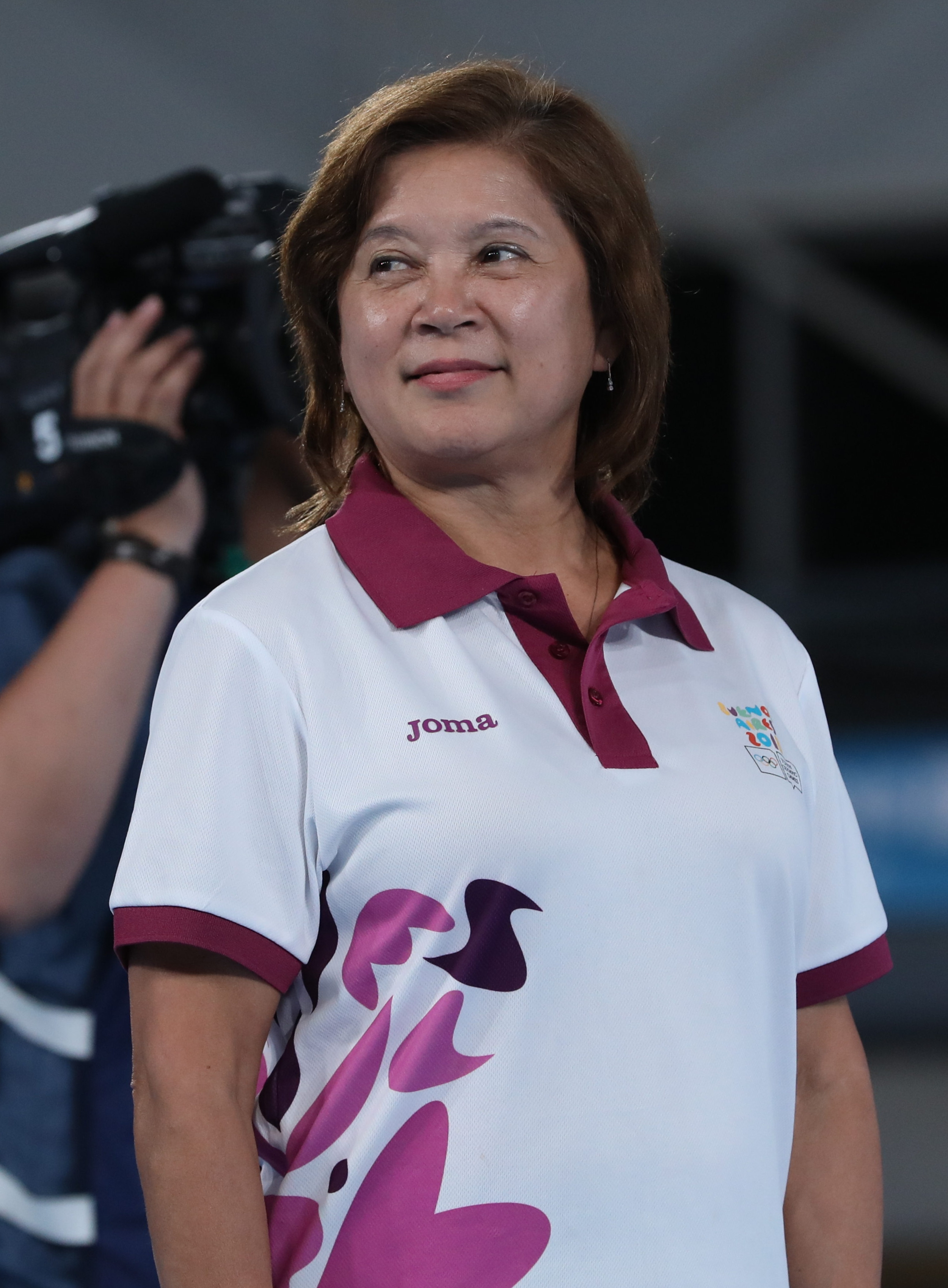
- Gold medalist Nellie Kim (2018)

Medalists
1st place, gold medalist(s)		Nellie Kim	Soviet Union
2nd place, silver medalist(s)		Ludmila Tourischeva	Soviet Union
3rd place, bronze medalist(s)		Nadia Comăneci	Romania

These are the results of the women's floor competition, one of six events for female competitors in artistic gymnastics at the 1976 Summer Olympics in Montreal. The qualification and final rounds took place on July 18, 19, and 22nd at the Montreal Forum.

== Results ==
=== Qualification ===
Eighty-six gymnasts competed in the compulsory and optional rounds on July 18 and 19. The six highest scoring gymnasts advanced to the final on July 22. Each country was limited to two competitors in the final. Half of the points earned by each gymnast during both the compulsory and optional rounds carried over to the final. This constitutes the "prelim" score.

=== Final ===
Rank	Gymnast	C	O	Prelim	Final	Total
Gold medal	Nellie Kim (URS)	9.800	9.900	9.850	10.000	19.850
Silver medal	Ludmila Tourischeva (URS)	9.900	9.950	9.925	9.900	19.825
Bronze medal	Nadia Comăneci (ROU)	9.750	9.850	9.800	9.950	19.750
4	Anna Pohludková (TCH)	9.650	9.800	9.725	9.850	19.575
5	Marion Kische (GDR)	9.650	9.700	9.675	9.800	19.475
6	Gitta Escher (GDR)	9.700	9.700	9.700	9.750	19.450
