= Kurt Thomas (gymnast) =

American gymnast (1956–2020)

- Kurt Thomas in Gymkata 1985

Personal information
- Full name: Kurt Bilteaux Thomas
- Born: March 29, 1956 Hollywood, Florida, U.S.
- Died: June 5, 2020 (aged 64) Texas, U.S.
- Height: 5 ft 5 in (165 cm)

Gymnastics career
- Discipline: Men's artistic gymnastics
- Country represented: United States
- College team: Indiana State Sycamores
- Eponymous skills: Thomas (pommel horse); Thomas (floor)
Medal record
Men's artistic gymnastics
Representing United States
Event	1st	2nd	3rd
World Championships	3	3	1
Pan American Games	1	2	2
Total	4	5	3
World Championships
Gold medal – first place	1978 Strasbourg	Floor
Gold medal – first place	1979 Fort Worth	Floor
Gold medal – first place	1979 Fort Worth	Horizontal bar
Silver medal – second place	1979 Fort Worth	All-around
Silver medal – second place	1979 Fort Worth	Pommel horse
Silver medal – second place	1979 Fort Worth	Parallel bars
Bronze medal – third place	1979 Fort Worth	Team
Pan American Games
Gold medal – first place	1975 Mexico City	Team
Silver medal – second place	1975 Mexico City	Pommel horse
Silver medal – second place	1975 Mexico City	Vault
Bronze medal – third place	1975 Mexico City	All-around
Bronze medal – third place	1975 Mexico City	Horizontal bar

Kurt Bilteaux Thomas (March 29, 1956 – June 5, 2020) was an American Olympic gymnast and part-time actor. He was a member of the United States men's national artistic gymnastics team and in 1978 he became the first American male gymnast to win a gold medal at the World Artistic Gymnastics Championships. In 1979, he won six medals at the world championship, setting the record for most medals won at a single world championship by an American gymnast, a feat matched only by Simone Biles in 2018. He competed in the 1976 Summer Olympics in Montreal. Thomas was favored to win a medal at the 1980 Summer Olympics but was unable to compete due to the USA boycott of the 1980 Olympic Games.

== Early life and education ==
Thomas was born in Hollywood, Florida, on March 29, 1956. His father worked as the manager of a meat company and died when Thomas was 7 years old. His mother, Ellie, was a secretary. Thomas considered pursuing professional basketball and football, but his interest in gymnastics was piqued at age 14 after watching the team from Miami-Dade Junior College practice. Thomas was awarded a scholarship to study at Indiana State University (ISU). He was a five-time NCAA champion at ISU, winning the parallel bars and all-around in 1977, and parallel bars, horizontal bar and the all-around in 1979. Thomas led the ISU men's gymnastics team to the 1977 National Championship.

== Career ==
Thomas earned All-America honors 13 times in his career. He was the James E. Sullivan Award winner in 1979, as well as the 1979 Nissen Award (the "Heisman" of men's gymnastics) awardee.

Thomas first competed as a member of the U.S. Olympic team at the 1976 Summer Olympics. Two years later, he became the first American male gymnast to win a gold medal in floor exercise, accomplishing the feat in the 1978 World Championships. He subsequently became the first gymnast to receive the James E. Sullivan Award for the best amateur athlete in the United States. Thomas earned six medals at the 1979 World Championships, including gold on the horizontal bar and floor exercise, and silver in the all-around, parallel bars, and pommel horse, establishing a new American record for most medals won at a single Worlds. The feat would later be tied by Simone Biles in 2018. He was seen as a favorite to win a gold medal at the 1980 Summer Olympics in Moscow; however, the games were boycotted by the United States government in protest of the Soviet invasion of Afghanistan.

Since the Olympics' strict amateurism rules at the time would have forced him to forgo many lucrative financial opportunities, Thomas elected not to attempt to compete in the 1984 Summer Olympics. With professionals allowed to compete by the time of the 1992 Summer Olympics, Thomas attempted a comeback. Despite his advanced age as a gymnast, he was able to make it to the 1992 United States Men's Gymnastics Olympic Trials, but his performance there fell short of what was needed to make the team.

== Signature moves ==
Three gymnastic moves were named for him, the Thomas flare, a pommel horse move, and the Thomas salto, his signature skill on floor exercise, a tucked 1.5 backward salto with 1.5 twists into a roll-out (a difficult and dangerous skill even by today's standards), and the Thomas on Horizontal Bar. The Thomas flare on pommel horse, and then also performed on floor, was developed over years by several pommel horse specialists. However, in gymnastics, new moves are named in the gymnastics rule book after the gymnast who is the first to perform the move in international competition.

== Film and television work ==
Thomas featured in the 1985 film Gymkata, playing the role of an American gymnast who travels to the fictional country of Parmistan to compete in a deadly competition called The Game. The film earned Thomas a Razzie Award nomination for Worst New Star and was poorly received by critics, but has developed somewhat of a cult following due to its unintentional comedy. Thomas also starred in the syndicated TV series True Confessions and worked as a commentator for ABC Sports and ESPN.

== Personal life ==
In 1996, Thomas married Rebecca Jones, a dancer who choreographs gymnastic routines. They had two children, Hunter and Kassidy. Thomas had a son from a previous marriage, Kurt Travis. Thomas and his wife ran the Kurt Thomas Gymnastics Training Center in Frisco, Texas. Since 2003, their gym has hosted the annual Kurt Thomas International Invitational gymnastics meet, a competition endorsed by USA Gymnastics.

Thomas was inducted into the International Gymnastics Hall of Fame in 2003. He was inducted into the USA Gymnastics Hall of Fame in 1990, the Indiana State University Athletics Hall of Fame in 1999, and the Missouri Valley Conference Hall of Fame in 2010.

Thomas died on June 5, 2020, at the age of 64. He suffered a stroke on May 24, brought about by a tear of the basilar artery in his brain stem two weeks before his death.

== Eponymous skills ==
Thomas has one named element on the pommel horse, originally given a difficulty value of B (0.2) but downgraded to A (0.1) in 1985. He also had one named element on the floor, originally named in 1985, but removed from the code of points in 2016.

Gymnastics elements named after Kurt Thomas
Apparatus	Name	Description	Difficulty (Note: Valid for the 2025–2028 Code of Points)	Added to Code of Points
Pommel horse	Thomas	"Any circle or flair in side support."	A, 0.1	1982, but first performed in 1979.
Floor	Thomas	"Jump bwd. with 3/2 salto t. and 3/2 t."	Removed from CoP on December 31, 2016.	1985, but first performed in 1982.
