= Ingrid Holkovičová =

Slovak gymnast (born 1959)

Personal information
- Nationality: Slovak
- Born: 5 December 1959 (age 66) Bratislava, Czechoslovakia

Sport
- Sport: Gymnastics

Ingrid Holkovičová (born 5 December 1959) is a Slovak gymnast. She competed in six events at the 1976 Summer Olympics.
