= Márta Egervári =

Hungarian gymnast (born 1956)

- Born: 4 August 1956 (age 70) Budapest, Hungary

Gymnastics career
- Discipline: Women's artistic gymnastics
- Country represented: Hungary
Medal record
Olympic Games
Bronze medal – third place	1976 Montreal	Uneven bars
World Championships
Bronze medal – third place	1974 Varna	Team

Márta Egervári (born 4 August 1956) is a retired Hungarian artistic gymnast, who competed in two consecutive Summer Olympics for her native country, starting in 1976. Her best result came in 1976, when she won a bronze medal on the uneven bars.
