= List of gymnasts at the 1976 Summer Olympics =

This is a list of the gymnasts who represented their country at the 1976 Summer Olympics in Montreal from 17 July to 1 August 1976. Only one discipline, artistic gymnastics, was included in the Games.

== Female artistic gymnasts ==
| | Name | Country | Date of birth (Age) |
|---|---|---|---|
| Youngest competitor | Karen Kelsall | Canada | 11 December 1962 (aged 13) |
| Oldest competitor | Miyuki Hironaka | Japan | 15 August 1945 (aged 30) |

| NOC | Name | Date of birth (Age) | Hometown |
|---|---|---|---|
| Australia | Wanita Lynch | 16 November 1958 (aged 17) | Perth, Western Australia |
| Belgium | Joëlle de Keukeleire | 27 September 1959 (aged 16) | Uccle, Belgium |
| Belgium | Monique Freres | 30 March 1957 (aged 19) | Seraing, Belgium |
| Bulgaria | Nadia Chatarova | 2 July 1960 (aged 16) | |
| Bulgaria | Svetla Kashtelyan | 13 August 1958 (aged 17) | |
| Bulgaria | Mariya Kircheva | 27 November 1957 (aged 18) | |
| Bulgaria | Nina Kostova | 11 September 1959 (aged 16) | |
| Bulgaria | Vesela Mateeva | 9 February 1960 (aged 16) | |
| Bulgaria | Galina Yaneva | 31 August 1959 (aged 16) | |
| Canada | Lise Arsenault | 14 December 1954 (aged 21) | Cartierville, Quebec |
| Canada | Karen Kelsall | 11 December 1962 (aged 13) | Nanaimo, British Columbia |
| Canada | Nancy McDonnell | 26 March 1955 (aged 21) | Toronto, Ontario |
| Canada | Teresa McDonnell | 8 December 1953 (aged 22) | Toronto, Ontario |
| Canada | Kelly Muncey | 29 November 1959 (aged 16) | New Westminster, British Columbia |
| Canada | Patti Rope | 27 December 1959 (aged 16) | Galt, Ontario |
| Czechoslovakia | Alena Černaková | 8 August 1961 (aged 14) | Plzeň, Czechoslovakia |
| Czechoslovakia | Ingrid Holkovičová | 5 December 1959 (aged 16) | Bratislava, Czechoslovakia |
| Czechoslovakia | Jana Knopová | 2 December 1957 (aged 18) | Ostrava, Czechoslovakia |
| Czechoslovakia | Anna Pohludková | 26 August 1959 (aged 16) | Hnojník, Czechoslovakia |
| Czechoslovakia | Eva Pořádková | 16 February 1959 (aged 17) | Zlín, Czechoslovakia |
| Czechoslovakia | Drahomíra Smolíková | 12 January 1959 (aged 17) | Ostrava, Czechoslovakia |
| East Germany | Carola Dombeck | 25 June 1960 (aged 16) | Merseburg, East Germany |
| East Germany | Gitta Escher | 18 March 1957 (aged 19) | Nordhausen, East Germany |
| East Germany | Kerstin Gerschau | 26 January 1958 (aged 18) | Leipzig, East Germany |
| East Germany | Angelika Hellmann | 10 April 1954 (aged 22) | Halle, East Germany |
| East Germany | Marion Kische | 30 March 1958 (aged 18) | Dresden, East Germany |
| East Germany | Steffi Kräker | 21 April 1960 (aged 16) | Leipzig, East Germany |
| France | Martine Audin | 13 June 1959 (aged 17) | Montceau-les-Mines, France |
| France | Nadine Audin | 3 April 1958 (aged 18) | Montceau-les-Mines, France |
| France | Chantal Seggiaro | 4 April 1956 (aged 20) | |
| Great Britain | Susan Cheesebrough | 9 September 1959 (aged 16) | Leicester, England |
| Great Britain | Avril Lennox | 26 April 1956 (aged 20) | Leicester, England |
| Great Britain | Barbara Slater | 10 May 1959 (aged 17) | Birmingham, England |
| Hungary | Márta Egervári | 4 August 1956 (aged 19) | Budapest, Hungary |
| Hungary | Márta Kelemen | 17 September 1954 (aged 21) | Budapest, Hungary |
| Hungary | Mária Lővey | 15 June 1960 (aged 16) | Dunaújváros, Hungary |
| Hungary | Krisztina Medveczky | 14 April 1958 (aged 18) | Budapest, Hungary |
| Hungary | Éva Óvári | 28 April 1962 (aged 14) | Dunaújváros, Hungary |
| Hungary | Margit Tóth | 27 October 1961 (aged 14) | Dunaújváros, Hungary |
| Italy | Stefania Bucci | 4 June 1960 (aged 16) | Montevarchi, Italy |
| Italy | Patrizia Fratini | 27 July 1961 (aged 14) | Prato, Italy |
| Italy | Rita Peri | 22 May 1957 (aged 19) | Novara, Italy |
| Italy | Donatella Sacchi | 16 July 1959 (aged 17) | Novara, Italy |
| Italy | Valentina Spongia | 12 October 1958 (aged 17) | Trieste, Italy |
| Italy | Carla Wieser | 11 March 1961 (aged 15) | Merano, Italy |
| Japan | Miyuki Hironaka | 15 August 1945 (aged 30) | Kyoto, Japan |
| Japan | Chieko Kikkawa | 16 March 1955 (aged 21) | Mihara, Japan |
| Japan | Kyoko Mano | 5 October 1956 (aged 19) | |
| Japan | Sakiko Nozawa | 12 July 1961 (aged 15) | Tokyo, Japan |
| Japan | Satoko Okazaki | 13 January 1961 (aged 15) | Tokyo, Japan |
| Japan | Nobue Yamazaki | 4 September 1950 (aged 25) | |
| Mexico | Teresa Díaz | 28 October 1959 (aged 16) | |
| Mexico | Patricia García | 18 January 1957 (aged 19) | |
| Netherlands | Monique Bolleboom | 11 August 1962 (aged 13) | Zoetermeer, Netherlands |
| Netherlands | Carla Braan | 23 July 1961 (aged 14) | Volendam, Netherlands |
| Netherlands | Ans Dekker | 1 March 1955 (aged 21) | Beverwijk, Netherlands |
| Netherlands | Joke Kos | 16 February 1956 (aged 20) | Heemskerk, Netherlands |
| Netherlands | Ans Smulders | 17 January 1951 (aged 25) | Eindhoven, Netherlands |
| Netherlands | Jeannette van Ravenstijn | 28 July 1958 (aged 17) | Eindhoven, Netherlands |
| Romania | Nadia Comăneci | 12 November 1961 (aged 14) | Onești, Romania |
| Romania | Mariana Constantin | 3 August 1960 (aged 15) | Ploiești, Romania |
| Romania | Georgeta Gabor | 10 January 1962 (aged 14) | Onești, Romania |
| Romania | Anca Grigoraș | 8 November 1957 (aged 18) | Comănești, Romania |
| Romania | Gabriela Trușcă | 15 August 1957 (aged 18) | Bacău, Romania |
| Romania | Teodora Ungureanu | 13 November 1960 (aged 15) | Reșița, Romania |
| Soviet Union | Maria Filatova | 19 July 1961 (aged 14) | Leninsk-Kuznetsky, Russian SFSR |
| Soviet Union | Svetlana Grozdova | 29 January 1959 (aged 17) | Rostov-on-Don, Russian SFSR |
| Soviet Union | Nellie Kim | 29 July 1957 (aged 18) | Shurab, Tajik SSR |
| Soviet Union | Olga Korbut | 16 May 1955 (aged 21) | Grodno, Byelorussian SSR |
| Soviet Union | Elvira Saadi | 2 January 1952 (aged 24) | Tashkent, Uzbek SSR |
| Soviet Union | Ludmilla Tourischeva | 7 October 1952 (aged 23) | Grozny, Russian SFSR |
| Spain | Elisa Cabello | 12 October 1956 (aged 19) | Alcalá de Guadaíra, Spain |
| Spain | Eloisa Marcos | 15 January 1962 (aged 14) | Mieres, Spain |
| Spain | Mercedes Vernetta | 30 March 1957 (aged 19) | Las Palmas, Canary Islands |
| United States | Kolleen Casey | 3 November 1959 (aged 16) | St. Paul, Minnesota |
| United States | Kimberly Chace | 4 May 1956 (aged 20) | Manchester, Tennessee |
| United States | Carrie Englert | 28 November 1957 (aged 18) | Tallahassee, Florida |
| United States | Kathy Howard | 21 June 1958 (aged 18) | Plainview, Texas |
| United States | Debra Willcox | 16 September 1959 (aged 16) | Denver, Colorado |
| United States | Leslie Wolfsberger | 5 February 1959 (aged 17) | Avon Park, Florida |
| West Germany | Andrea Bieger | 8 October 1959 (aged 16) | Kiel, West Germany |
| West Germany | Petra Kurbjuweit | 9 November 1956 (aged 19) | Buer, West Germany |
| West Germany | Jutta Oltersdorf | 17 April 1956 (aged 20) | Köndringen, West Germany |
| West Germany | Beate Renschler | 2 September 1958 (aged 17) | Rastatt, West Germany |
| West Germany | Uta Schorn | 7 August 1957 (aged 18) | Cologne, West Germany |
| West Germany | Traudl Schubert | 25 September 1957 (aged 18) | Penzberg, West Germany |

== Male artistic gymnasts ==
| | Name | Country | Date of birth (Age) |
|---|---|---|---|
| Youngest competitor | Stoyan Deltchev | Bulgaria | 3 July 1959 (aged 17) |
| Oldest competitor | Miloslav Netušil | Czechoslovakia | 20 February 1946 (aged 30) |

| NOC | Name | Date of birth (Age) | Hometown |
|---|---|---|---|
| Australia | Phil Cheetham | 26 October 1954 (aged 21) | |
| Australia | Peter Lloyd | 22 September 1949 (aged 26) | Melbourne, Victoria |
| Bulgaria | Stoyan Deltchev | 3 July 1959 (aged 17) | Plovdiv, Bulgaria |
| Bulgaria | Andrey Keranov | 20 September 1955 (aged 20) | |
| Bulgaria | Dimitar Koychev | 27 March 1953 (aged 23) | |
| Bulgaria | Zhivko Rusev | 8 June 1959 (aged 17) | |
| Bulgaria | Georgi Todorov | 19 February 1949 (aged 27) | |
| Bulgaria | Toncho Todorov | 27 September 1958 (aged 17) | |
| Canada | Keith Carter | 16 October 1952 (aged 23) | Winnipeg, Manitoba |
| Canada | Philip Delesalle | 18 July 1958 (aged 17) | Victoria, British Columbia |
| Canada | Pierre Leclerc | 24 October 1953 (aged 22) | Sainte-Thérèse, Quebec |
| Cuba | Nelson Fernández | 29 August 1957 (aged 18) | |
| Cuba | Roberto León | 12 June 1954 (aged 22) | Cárdenas, Cuba |
| Czechoslovakia | Dimitrios Janulidis | 1 February 1956 (aged 20) | Brno, Czechoslovakia |
| Czechoslovakia | Vladislav Nehasil | 23 March 1947 (aged 29) | Ústí nad Labem, Czechoslovakia |
| Czechoslovakia | Miloslav Netušil | 20 February 1946 (aged 30) | Chomutov, Czechoslovakia |
| Czechoslovakia | Jiří Tabák | 8 August 1955 (aged 20) | Karviná, Czechoslovakia |
| Czechoslovakia | Gustav Tannenberger | 8 June 1953 (aged 23) | Vyškov, Czechoslovakia |
| Czechoslovakia | Jan Zoulík | 2 February 1957 (aged 19) | Horní Počernice, Czechoslovakia |
| Denmark | Ole Benediktson | 19 February 1949 (aged 27) | Svostrup, Denmark |
| East Germany | Roland Brückner | 14 December 1955 (aged 20) | Köthen, East Germany |
| East Germany | Rainer Hanschke | 22 December 1951 (aged 24) | Finsterwalde, East Germany |
| East Germany | Bernd Jäger | 18 November 1951 (aged 24) | Kahla, East Germany |
| East Germany | Wolfgang Klotz | 4 November 1951 (aged 24) | Torgau, East Germany |
| East Germany | Lutz Mack | 29 October 1952 (aged 23) | Delitzsch, East Germany |
| East Germany | Michael Nikolay | 13 December 1956 (aged 19) | Berlin, East Germany |
| France | Henri Boério | 13 June 1952 (aged 24) | Sétif, Algeria |
| France | Michel Boutard | 21 April 1956 (aged 20) | |
| France | Patrick Boutet | 14 December 1951 (aged 24) | |
| France | Bernard Decoux | 9 September 1956 (aged 19) | |
| France | Éric Koloko | 1 November 1950 (aged 25) | Lille, France |
| France | Willi Moy | 13 June 1956 (aged 20) | Forbach, France |
| Great Britain | Jeff Davis | 31 March 1954 (aged 22) | |
| Great Britain | Ian Neale | 11 August 1954 (aged 21) | Bedworth, England |
| Great Britain | Tommy Wilson | 17 August 1953 (aged 22) | |
| Hungary | Imre Bánrévi | 14 November 1954 (aged 21) | Budapest, Hungary |
| Hungary | Ferenc Donáth | 28 June 1954 (aged 22) | Nagykőrös, Hungary |
| Hungary | Árpád Farkas | 28 October 1957 (aged 18) | Budapest, Hungary |
| Hungary | Béla Laufer | 27 July 1955 (aged 20) | Budapest, Hungary |
| Hungary | Zoltán Magyar | 13 December 1953 (aged 22) | Budapest, Hungary |
| Hungary | Imre Molnár | 30 March 1949 (aged 27) | Miskolc, Hungary |
| Israel | Dov Lupi | 24 August 1948 (aged 27) | Sarid, Israel |
| Italy | Maurizio Milanetto | 14 July 1953 (aged 23) | Padua, Italy |
| Italy | Maurizio Montesi | 19 September 1952 (aged 23) | Forlì, Italy |
| Italy | Angelo Zucca | 26 December 1955 (aged 20) | Cagliari, Italy |
| Japan | Shun Fujimoto | 11 May 1950 (aged 26) | Hiroshima Prefecture, Japan |
| Japan | Hisato Igarashi | 19 February 1951 (aged 25) | Tochigi Prefecture, Japan |
| Japan | Hiroshi Kajiyama | 13 June 1953 (aged 23) | Kanagawa Prefecture, Japan |
| Japan | Sawao Kato | 11 October 1946 (aged 29) | Gosen, Japan |
| Japan | Eizo Kenmotsu | 13 February 1948 (aged 28) | Okayama Prefecture, Japan |
| Japan | Mitsuo Tsukahara | 22 December 1947 (aged 28) | Tokyo, Japan |
| Poland | Grzegorz Ciastek | 28 April 1955 (aged 21) | Warsaw, Poland |
| Poland | Marian Pieczka | 12 October 1951 (aged 24) | Rybnik, Poland |
| Poland | Andrzej Szajna | 30 September 1949 (aged 26) | Wrocław, Poland |
| Poland | Roman Tkaczyk | 9 January 1954 (aged 22) | Warsaw, Poland |
| Poland | Łukasz Uhma | 20 January 1954 (aged 22) | Warsaw, Poland |
| Poland | Mariusz Zasada | 19 January 1951 (aged 25) | Bydgoszcz, Poland |
| Romania | Mihai Borș | 11 January 1951 (aged 25) | Bucharest, Romania |
| Romania | Sorin Cepoi | 13 September 1956 (aged 19) | Bucharest, Romania |
| Romania | Ion Checicheș | 18 March 1955 (aged 21) | Reșița, Romania |
| Romania | Ștefan Gal | 8 August 1951 (aged 24) | Gheorgheni, Romania |
| Romania | Dan Grecu | 23 September 1950 (aged 25) | Bucharest, Romania |
| Romania | Nicolae Oprescu | 1 March 1953 (aged 23) | Bucharest, Romania |
| Soviet Union | Nikolai Andrianov | 14 October 1952 (aged 23) | Vladimir, Russian SFSR |
| Soviet Union | Aleksandr Dityatin | 7 August 1957 (aged 18) | Saint Petersburg, Russian SFSR |
| Soviet Union | Gennady Krysin | 25 December 1957 (aged 18) | Moscow, Russian SFSR |
| Soviet Union | Vladimir Marchenko | 22 September 1952 (aged 23) | Grozny, Russian SFSR |
| Soviet Union | Vladimir Markelov | 24 October 1957 (aged 18) | Chelyabinsk, Russian SFSR |
| Soviet Union | Vladimir Tikhonov | 31 October 1956 (aged 19) | Grozny, Russian SFSR |
| Spain | Fernando Bertrand | 8 January 1955 (aged 21) | Madrid, Spain |
| Spain | Gabriel Calvo | 5 August 1955 (aged 20) | Madrid, Spain |
| Spain | José de la Casa | 1 March 1957 (aged 19) | Jaén, Spain |
| Switzerland | Ueli Bachmann | 4 May 1950 (aged 26) | |
| Switzerland | Robert Bretscher | 6 August 1953 (aged 22) | Winterthur, Switzerland |
| Switzerland | Philippe Gaille | 8 October 1951 (aged 24) | |
| Switzerland | Bernhard Locher | 8 May 1949 (aged 27) | |
| Switzerland | Peter Rohner | 12 April 1949 (aged 27) | St. Gallen, Switzerland |
| Switzerland | Armin Vock | 29 November 1952 (aged 23) | Thalwil, Switzerland |
| United States | Marshall Avener | 10 December 1950 (aged 25) | Brooklyn, New York |
| United States | Tom Beach | 18 January 1955 (aged 21) | Buffalo, New York |
| United States | Bart Conner | 28 March 1958 (aged 18) | Chicago, Illinois |
| United States | Peter Kormann | 21 June 1955 (aged 21) | Braintree, Massachusetts |
| United States | Kurt Thomas | 29 March 1956 (aged 20) | Hollywood, Florida |
| United States | Wayne Young | 1 June 1952 (aged 24) | Westwood, California |
| West Germany | Reinhard Dietze | 18 August 1954 (aged 21) | Siegen, West Germany |
| West Germany | Eberhard Gienger | 21 July 1951 (aged 24) | Künzelsau, West Germany |
| West Germany | Edgar Jorek | 2 December 1955 (aged 20) | Wolfsburg, West Germany |
| West Germany | Reinhard Ritter | 24 September 1948 (aged 27) | Haßloch, West Germany |
| West Germany | Volker Rohrwick | 16 July 1954 (aged 22) | Westhofen, West Germany |
| West Germany | Werner Steinmetz | 12 March 1950 (aged 26) | Pforzheim, West Germany |
