= Gymnastics at the 1976 Summer Olympics – Women's artistic team all-around =

Women's artistic team all-around at the Games of the XXI Olympiad

Medalists
1st place, gold medalist(s)		Maria Filatova, Svetlana Grozdova, Nellie Kim, Olga Korbut, Elvira Saadi, Ludmilla Tourischeva	Soviet Union
2nd place, silver medalist(s)		Nadia Comăneci, Mariana Constantin, Georgeta Gabor, Anca Grigoraș, Gabriela Trușcă, Teodora Ungureanu	Romania
3rd place, bronze medalist(s)		Carola Dombeck, Gitta Escher, Kerstin Gerschau, Angelika Hellmann, Marion Kische, Steffi Kräker	East Germany

These are the results of the women's team all-around competition, one of six events for female competitors in artistic gymnastics at the 1976 Summer Olympics in Montreal. There were a total of 14 events: 6 for women and 8 for men. The compulsory and optional rounds took place on July 18 and 19 at the Montreal Forum.

A new rule was introduced for both men's and women's events: only the three highest qualifiers from each country would be allowed to compete in the individual all-around.

== Results ==
The final score for each team was determined by combining all of the scores earned by the team on each apparatus during the compulsory and optional rounds. If all six gymnasts on a team performed a routine on a single apparatus during compulsories or optionals, only the five highest scores on that apparatus counted toward the team total.

Rank	Team	Vault			Uneven Bars			Balance Beam			Floor			Total	Rank
Rank	Team	C	O	Rank	C	O	Rank	C	O	Rank	C	O	Rank	Total	Rank
Gold medal	Soviet Union	97.700		1	97.850		2	96.400		1	97.900		1	390.350	
Gold medal	Ludmilla Tourischeva	9.800	9.800	2	9.750	9.800	10	9.400	9.850	5	9.900	9.950	1	78.250	2
Gold medal	Nellie Kim	9.800	9.900	1	9.800	9.850	7	9.400	9.800	7	9.800	9.900	2	78.250	2
Gold medal	Olga Korbut	9.750	9.700	7	9.900	9.900	2	9.800	9.850	2	9.350	9.700	17	77.950	5
Gold medal	Elvira Saadi	9.700	9.700	8	9.700	9.700	14	9.550	9.700	5	9.700	9.700	6	77.450	7
Gold medal	Maria Filatova	9.650	9.900	3	9.500	9.600	26	9.300	9.750	10	9.500	9.850	8	77.050	9
Gold medal	Svetlana Grozdova	9.500	9.500	21	9.700	9.750	12	9.800	9.200	13	9.800	9.800	3	77.050	9
Silver medal	Romania	96.000		3	98.500		1	96.850		2	95.800		3	387.150	
Silver medal	Nadia Comăneci	9.700	9.850	3	10.000	10.000	1	9.900	10.000	1	9.750	9.850	3	79.050	1
Silver medal	Teodora Ungureanu	9.650	9.700	10	9.900	9.900	2	9.750	9.850	3	9.550	9.750	10	78.050	4
Silver medal	Mariana Constantin	9.500	9.650	13	9.850	9.850	6	9.450	9.600	10	9.350	9.500	30	76.750	14
Silver medal	Anca Grigoraș	9.450	9.500	23	9.650	9.750	14	9.600	9.750	4	9.450	9.550	19	76.700	15
Silver medal	Gabriela Trușcă	9.650	9.250	25	9.750	9.850	9	9.300	9.600	16	9.300	9.400	44	76.100	18
Silver medal	Georgeta Gabor	9.300	9.350	38	9.500	9.600	26	9.350	9.550	16	9.450	9.600	17	75.700	21
Bronze medal	East Germany	96.700		2	97.800		3	94.400		3	96.200		2	385.100	
Bronze medal	Gitta Escher	9.700	9.800	5	9.750	9.800	10	9.500	9.650	8	9.700	9.700	6	77.600	6
Bronze medal	Marion Kische	9.450	9.700	13	9.900	9.900	2	9.400	9.500	16	9.650	9.700	8	77.200	8
Bronze medal	Kerstin Gerschau	9.550	9.600	13	9.800	9.850	7	9.400	9.600	13	9.500	9.700	12	77.000	12
Bronze medal	Angelika Hellmann	9.500	9.600	16	9.600	9.800	14	9.500	9.600	9	9.600	9.700	10	76.900	13
Bronze medal	Steffi Kräker	9.600	9.750	10	9.650	9.750	14	9.300	8.950	38	9.350	9.350	44	75.700	21
Bronze medal	Carola Dombeck	9.600	9.900	5	9.500	9.550	30	9.300	8.100	72	9.400	9.550	33	74.900	33
4	Hungary	95.500		4	96.600		4	93.700		4	94.350		6	380.150	
4	Márta Egervári	9.700	9.700	8	9.850	9.900	5	9.200	9.550	20	9.450	9.700	14	77.050	9
4	Krisztina Medveczky	9.450	9.600	17	9.800	9.650	12	9.150	9.500	22	9.400	9.600	19	76.150	17
4	Margit Tóth	9.500	9.550	17	9.650	9.750	14	9.300	9.500	19	9.250	9.550	34	76.050	19
4	Éva Óvári	9.300	9.400	34	9.350	9.550	38	9.400	9.600	13	9.350	9.450	34	75.400	25
4	Mária Lővey	9.550	9.700	12	9.450	9.400	41	9.100	9.350	27	9.200	9.400	50	75.150	27
4	Márta Kelemen	9.350	9.400	32	9.500	9.500	33	9.150	9.300	27	9.100	9.350	57	74.650	34
5	Czechoslovakia	94.100		5	95.100		6	93.250		5	95.800		3	378.250	
5	Anna Pohludková	9.350	9.350	34	9.450	9.800	22	9.350	9.700	10	9.650	9.800	5	76.450	16
5	Ingrid Holkovičová	9.300	9.600	25	9.200	9.750	35	9.300	9.450	20	9.400	9.600	19	75.600	23
5	Jana Knopová	9.350	9.200	44	9.350	9.650	33	9.400	9.000	33	9.500	9.650	14	75.100	28
5	Drahomíra Smolíková	9.150	9.250	56	9.550	9.700	22	9.250	9.200	27	9.500	9.450	24	75.050	29
5	Eva Pořádková	9.450	9.600	17	9.100	9.350	61	9.150	9.250	33	9.400	9.750	14	75.050	29
5	Alena Černáková	9.350	9.500	28	9.100	9.550	51	9.000	9.200	40	9.300	9.550	30	74.550	40
6	United States	94.000		4	95.700		5	90.650		9	94.700		5	375.050	
6	Kimberly Chace	9.500	9.350	28	9.550	9.750	20	9.200	9.250	27	9.350	9.500	30	75.450	24
6	Debra Willcox	9.600	9.450	17	9.600	9.500	26	9.200	9.150	36	9.150	9.400	52	75.050	29
6	Leslie Wolfsberger	9.300	9.300	40	9.600	9.700	20	9.200	8.650	55	9.250	9.650	28	74.650	34
6	Kolleen Casey	9.500	9.450	23	9.450	9.600	30	9.150	8.650	58	9.400	9.300	44	74.500	41
6	Carrie Englert	9.200	9.300	51	9.400	9.400	44	9.300	8.850	45	9.350	9.600	24	74.400	42
6	Kathy Howard	9.250	9.200	53	9.250	9.550	44	9.000	8.700	63	9.500	9.700	12	74.150	46
7	West Germany	93.550		8	94.250		8	92.400		6	93.300		10	373.500	
7	Andrea Bieger	9.400	9.600	21	9.600	9.800	14	9.150	9.450	24	9.400	9.550	24	75.950	20
7	Petra Kurbjuweit	9.400	9.350	32	9.300	9.600	38	8.900	9.600	40	9.300	9.450	37	74.600	36
7	Jutta Oltersdorf	9.300	9.050	63	9.350	9.700	30	9.150	9.300	27	9.350	9.400	37	74.600	36
7	Traudl Schubert	9.150	9.250	56	9.200	9.500	47	9.150	9.050	40	9.100	9.200	66	73.600	55
7	Uta Schorn	9.350	9.300	38	9.150	8.800	80	9.100	9.550	22	9.000	9.300	66	73.550	56
7	Beate Renschler	9.350	9.250	40	9.400	8.800	72	9.200	8.800	49	9.250	9.200	57	73.250	59
8	Japan	93.750		7	93.850		9	90.700		7	93.800		7	372.100	
8	Satoko Okazaki	9.300	9.500	31	9.450	9.800	22	9.250	9.150	33	9.300	9.550	30	75.300	26
8	Miyuki Hironaka	9.500	9.400	25	9.350	9.500	41	9.200	9.300	25	9.300	9.450	37	75.000	32
8	Nobue Yamazaki	9.100	9.600	34	9.150	9.350	58	9.050	9.100	45	9.200	9.300	54	73.850	50
8	Chieko Kikkawa	9.400	9.450	28	8.900	9.600	58	9.000	8.600	68	9.300	9.400	44	73.650	53
8	Sakiko Nozawa	9.050	9.250	66	9.150	9.250	63	9.150	8.600	62	9.400	9.600	19	73.450	57
8	Kyoko Mano	9.250	9.200	53	9.250	8.900	73	8.900	8.900	58	9.200	9.200	62	72.800	65
9	Canada	92.700		9	93.500		10	90.000		10	93.450		9	369.650	
9	Karen Kelsall	9.100	9.500	40	9.200	9.500	47	9.100	9.200	37	9.250	9.500	37	74.350	43
9	Patti Rope	9.250	9.200	53	8.900	9.350	68	9.200	9.250	27	9.250	9.500	37	73.900	47
9	Nancy McDonnell	9.350	9.350	34	9.200	9.600	44	8.900	9.100	49	9.000	9.400	62	73.900	47
9	Kelly Muncey	9.150	9.450	40	9.300	9.650	35	9.100	8.750	55	9.100	9.300	51	73.800	51
9	Lise Arsenault	9.050	9.200	72	9.100	9.450	55	8.200	9.000	78	9.200	9.550	37	72.750	66
9	Teresa McDonnell	9.050	9.300	63	8.950	9.550	58	8.400	8.600	83	9.300	9.400	44	72.550	71
10	Bulgaria	92.550		10	93.300		11	90.700		7	92.600		11	369.150	
10	Nina Kostova	9.250	9.250	51	9.400	9.450	41	9.100	9.400	25	9.250	9.500	37	74.600	36
10	Nadia Chatarova	9.050	9.500	44	9.500	9.400	38	9.100	8.700	58	9.200	9.450	49	73.900	47
10	Galina Yaneva	9.400	9.150	44	9.200	9.350	55	9.000	9.200	40	9.100	9.350	57	73.750	52
10	Vesela Mateeva	9.050	9.350	56	9.250	9.300	55	9.050	9.150	40	9.000	9.300	66	73.450	57
10	Maria Kircheva	9.150	9.250	56	9.050	9.400	61	9.050	8.950	49	9.050	9.300	65	73.200	60
10	Svetla Kashtelyan	9.100	9.250	63	8.800	9.150	80	8.900	8.000	84	8.850	9.400	73	71.450	79
11	Netherlands	92.100		11	94.550		7	89.800		11	91.550		12	368.000	
11	Ans Smulders	9.300	9.250	44	9.500	9.700	25	8.950	9.300	38	9.150	9.450	50	74.600	36
11	Jeannette van Ravenstijn	9.200	9.350	44	9.450	9.650	26	9.000	9.050	47	9.100	9.400	54	74.200	45
11	Monique Bolleboom	9.200	9.100	66	9.250	9.450	47	8.700	9.100	58	9.000	9.300	66	73.100	62
11	Joke Kos	9.150	9.250	56	9.050	9.550	53	8.800	9.100	54	8.850	9.100	80	72.850	63
11	Ans Dekker	9.050	9.250	66	9.300	9.650	35	8.750	8.850	68	8.800	9.200	79	72.850	63
11	Carla Braan	8.900	9.000	81	8.950	9.300	68	8.900	8.450	75	8.900	9.200	76	71.600	76
12	Italy	91.200		12	91.550		12	88.650		12	93.700		8	365.100	
12	Stefania Bucci	9.250	9.300	44	9.150	9.550	47	8.950	9.100	47	9.350	9.650	19	74.300	44
12	Patrizia Fratini	9.000	9.300	66	8.950	9.150	75	8.900	8.650	70	9.300	9.500	34	72.750	66
12	Valentina Spongia	8.950	9.150	76	9.050	9.300	65	8.800	8.900	63	9.100	9.350	57	72.600	68
12	Donatella Sacchi	9.000	9.300	66	8.850	9.150	78	8.750	8.950	63	9.150	9.400	52	72.550	71
12	Rita Peri	8.800	8.700	84	8.850	9.450	67	8.750	8.300	82	9.300	9.600	28	71.750	75
12	Carla Wieser	8.950	9.000	80	8.950	8.750	83	8.750	8.900	67	8.950	9.300	73	71.550	77
	Avril Lennox (GBR)	9.200	9.350	44	9.150	9.450	53	8.800	9.200	49	9.100	9.400	54	73.650	53
	Joelle de Keukeleire (BEL)	9.000	9.300	66	9.150	9.500	51	8.850	9.100	53	9.000	9.300	66	73.200	60
	Barbara Slater (GBR)	9.050	9.350	56	8.900	9.350	68	8.750	8.950	63	8.950	9.300	73	72.600	68
	Nadine Audin (FRA)	9.100	9.300	56	9.050	9.300	65	8.800	8.600	72	9.100	9.350	57	72.600	68
	Martine Audin (FRA)	9.100	8.900	79	8.900	9.100	78	8.800	9.050	55	9.000	9.300	66	72.150	73
	Chantal Seggiaro (FRA)	8.800	9.400	73	8.950	9.300	68	8.700	8.500	78	8.900	9.400	66	71.950	74
	Eloisa Marcos (ESP)	8.800	8.850	83	9.000	9.400	63	8.500	8.900	72	8.900	9.150	78	71.500	78
	Monique Freres (BEL)	8.950	9.200	75	8.650	9.300	80	8.650	8.800	71	8.700	9.200	81	71.450	79
	Susan Cheesebrough (GBR)	8.900	9.000	81	8.900	9.200	75	8.300	9.050	75	8.900	9.200	76	71.450	79
	Elisa Cabello (ESP)	8.950	9.100	77	8.850	9.250	75	8.450	8.850	77	8.800	9.000	82	71.250	82
	Wanita Lynch (AUS)	9.100	9.100	73	8.800	9.350	73	8.550	8.650	78	8.450	9.200	83	71.200	83
	Mercedes Vernetta (ESP)	9.050	9.000	77	8.400	8.700	86	8.300	8.850	81	8.550	8.900	85	69.750	84
	Teresa Díaz Sandi (MEX)	8.600	8.900	84	8.700	9.000	83	8.000	8.800	85	8.250	9.100	86	69.350	85
	Patricia García (MEX)	8.500	8.900	86	8.650	8.800	85	8.550	7.400	86	8.350	9.200	84	68.350	86

== See also ==
- Olympic medalists in gymnastics (men)
- Olympic medalists in gymnastics (women)
