= Nallet =

Nallet is a French surname, and may refer to:

- Jean-Claude Nallet (1947–2023), a French Olympic sprinter
- Chantal Seggiaro (-Nallet, born 1956), a French Olympic gymnast, wife of Jean-Claude Nallet
- Henri Nallet (born 1939), a French politician
- Lionel Nallet (born 1976), a French rugby player
