= Keukeleire =

Keukeleire, Dekeukeleire or De Keukeleire is a surname. Notable people with the surname include:

- Charles Dekeukeleire (1905-1971), Belgian film director.
- Jens Keukeleire (born 1988), Belgian cyclist
- Joëlle De Keukeleire (born 1959), Belgian gymnast
