= Fratini =

Fratini is a surname. Notable people with the surname include:

- Renato Fratini (1932–1973), Italian commercial artist
- Renzo Fratini (born 1944), Italian Catholic bishop and diplomat
- Gina Fratini (1931–2017), British fashion designer
- Patrizia Fratini (born 1961), Italian gymnast
