= Gymnastics at the 1976 Summer Olympics – Women's vault =

Women's vault at the Games of the XXI Olympiad
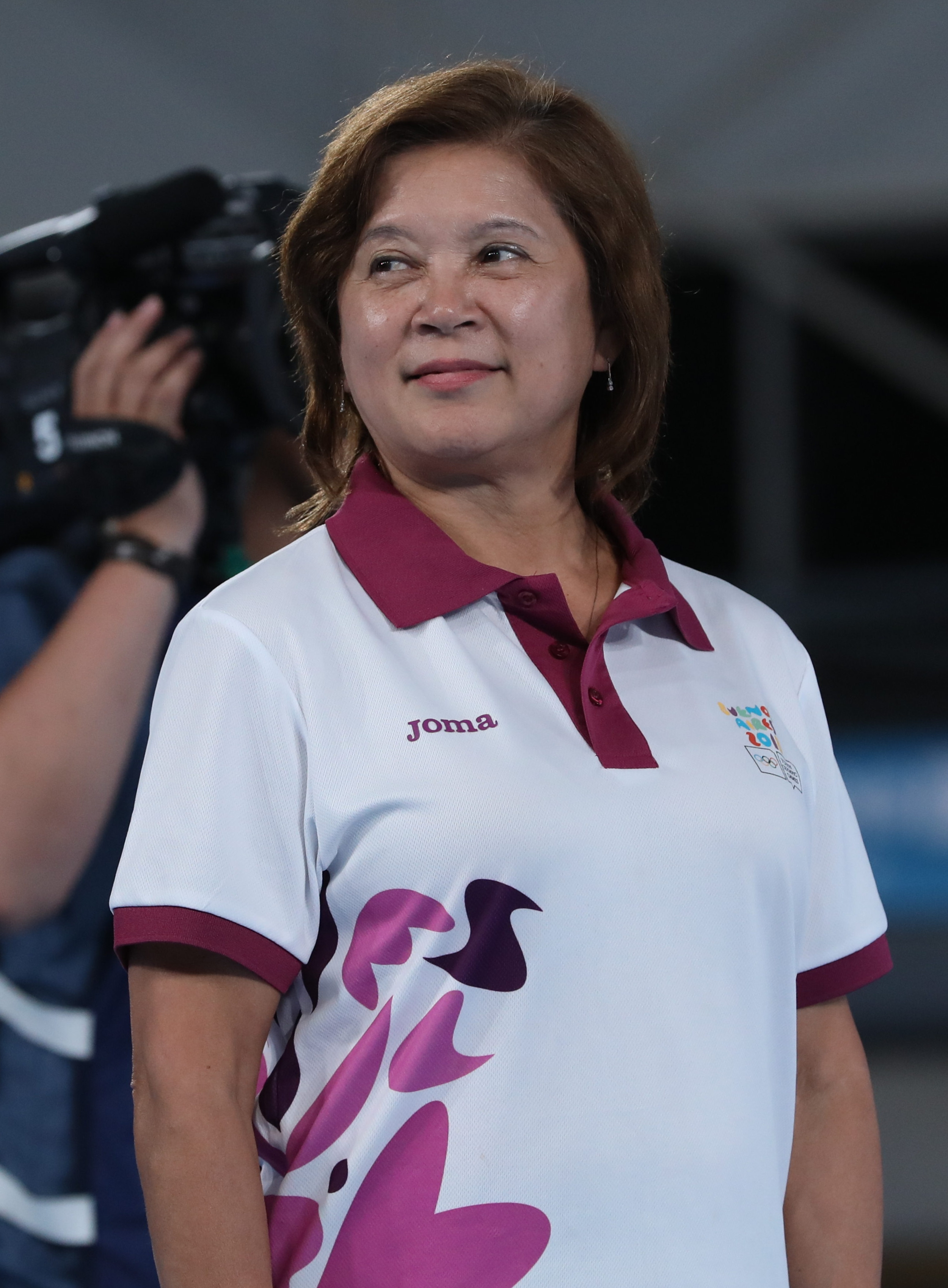
- Gold medalist Nellie Kim (2018)

Medalists
1st place, gold medalist(s)		Nellie Kim	Soviet Union
2nd place, silver medalist(s)		Ludmila Tourischeva	Soviet Union
2nd place, silver medalist(s)		Carola Dombeck	East Germany
3rd place, bronze medalist(s)		not awarded	

These are the results of the women's vault competition, one of eight events for female competitors in artistic gymnastics at the 1976 Summer Olympics in Montreal. The qualification and final rounds took place on July 18, 19, and 22nd at the Montreal Forum.

== Results ==
=== Qualification ===
Eighty-six gymnasts competed in the compulsory and optional rounds on July 18 and 19. The six highest scoring gymnasts advanced to the final on July 22. Each country was limited to two competitors in the final. Half of the points earned by each gymnast during both the compulsory and optional rounds carried over to the final. This constitutes the "prelim" score.

=== Final ===
Rank	Gymnast	C	O	Prelim	Final	Total
Gold medal	Nellie Kim (URS)	9.800	9.900	9.850	9.950	19.800
Silver medal	Ludmila Tourischeva (URS)	9.800	9.800	9.800	9.850	19.650
Silver medal	Carola Dombeck (GDR)	9.600	9.900	9.750	9.900	19.650
4	Nadia Comăneci (ROU)	9.700	9.850	9.775	9.850	19.625
5	Gitta Escher (GDR)	9.700	9.800	9.750	9.800	19.550
6	Márta Egervári (HUN)	9.700	9.700	9.700	9.750	19.450
