= List of Maison Ikkoku chapters =

The cover of Maison Ikkoku volume 1 as released by Viz Media on October 24, 2003

Maison Ikkoku is a manga series written and illustrated by Rumiko Takahashi. It was serialized in Shogakukan's Big Comic Spirits from November 15, 1980, to April 20, 1987. It has been adapted into an anime series and a live action film and two episode TV drama. The plot follows Yusaku Godai, a rōnin who resides in an old apartment complex named Maison Ikkoku as he studies for the university entrance exam. Yusaku's life progression and interactions progress episodically and focuses on his growing relationship with the apartment manager, Kyoko Otonashi.

Shogakukan collected the individual chapters into fifteen tankōbon volumes between May 1982 and July 1987. The series was later republished in ten wide-ban volumes between July 1992 and April 1993. The ten volume format was later rereleased as bunkobans between December 1996 and April 1997. Shogakukan's third rerelease of the series follows the fifteen volume format which were released as a shinsōban edition between April 2007 and October 2007.

Viz Media licensed Maison Ikkoku and localized it in English for North America. The translation was handled by Gerard Jones, Rachel Thorn (credited as Matt Thorn), and Mari Morimoto. Viz Media serialized the series as a comic book where each book featured a single chapter; the comic book issues were published between June 1992 and January 2000. The comic book format used a different chapter numbering and skipped some chapters; the artwork was also flipped to read left-to-right. The comic book chapters were collected and released in fourteen tankōbon graphic novel volumes between December 1994 and June 2000. Viz later re-released the series complete and un-flipped in the same format as Shogakukan's fifteen volume format between October 2003 and February 2006. Viz republished Maison Ikkoku in a "Collector's Edition" based on the Japanese wide-ban, with the first volume released on September 15, 2020, and the tenth and last on December 27, 2022. The Collector's Edition also received a new translation by Matt Treyvaud.

== Chapter list ==
Chapter no.	Viz title [Revised title] Original Japanese title	Magazine release date
1	"What Are the Neighbors Doing?" "[What's Happening Next Door?!]" (Tonari wa Nani o...!? (隣はなにを…!?))	November 1980
Unable to tolerate his neighbors any longer, Yusaku Godai prepares to move out of Maison Ikkoku but reconsiders when he meets Kyoko Otonashi, the new manager; the residents hold an impromptu welcome party.
2	"Mr. Soichiro" "[Soichiro!]" (Sōichirō-san!! (惣一郎さんっ!!))	December 1980
Godai is misled to believe Kyoko has a boyfriend named Soichiro; confusion ensues because her dog shares the name, after her beloved.
3	"Suit Yourself, Santa" "[Take It or Eve It]" (Katte ni Seiya (勝手に聖夜, lit. "Christmas Eve How You Like It"))	January 1981
Godai tries to present Kyoko a brooch but ultimately fails due to Kentaro Ichinose, the young son of the Ichinose family, who becomes attached to Kyoko.
4	"For Whom the Clock Tolls" "[The Bell Rings at Dawn]" (Akatsuki ni Kane wa Naru (暁に鐘は鳴る))	February 1981
Godai tries to study for his entrance exam; to help, Kyoko attempts to prevent the tenants from interfering with his studies.
5	"Hope Springs Eternal" "[Spring Tidings?]" (Haru Tōkaraji!? (春遠からじ!?))	March 1981
Kyoko has a girl to girl talk with Hanae Ichinose, Kentaro's mom; Mrs. Ichinose comes to believe Kyoko is in love with Godai. When Kyoko discovers Godai is skipping his exam, she escorts him to his next exam.
6	"Will the Cherry Blossoms Bloom!?" "[Pass or Fail?]" (Sakura Saku ka!? (サクラサクカ!?))	April 1981
Convinced he failed his exams, Godai avoids Maison Ikkoku for a week; his grandmother visits and finds him at the announcement board, where he learns he passed.
7	"Spring Wasabi" (Haru no Wasabi (春のワサビ))	May 1981
The landlord arrives at Maison Ikkoku with his granddaughter Ikoku for a graveside visit, where Godai learns Kyoko was widowed after six months of marriage to the landlord's son, Soichiro.
8	"Soichiro's Shadow" (Sōichirō no Kage (惣一郎の影))	June 1981
Kyoko tells Mrs. Ichinose she has no plans to remarry, but the residents are suspicious as she sees him off for his new part-time job tutoring Ikoku.
9	"Alcohol Love Call" (Arukōru Rabu Kōru (アルコール・ラブコール))	July 1981
A drunken Godai loudly declares his love for Kyoko; Mrs. Ichinose tricks him by saying he danced naked for Kyoko, and his apology, playing it off as a joke, earns him another slap.
10	"Don't Fence Me Out" "[Fenced Out]" (Kanaami wa Koerarenai (金網は越えられない))	July 15, 1981
Kyoko joins the neighborhood tennis association, led by hunky coach Shun Mitaka; Godai is jealous.
11	""Love" Means No Score, Godai!" "[Mitaka v Godai]" (Mitaka, Godai!! (三鷹、五代!!))	July 30, 1981
Yotsuya plants the idea that Mitaka is Kyoko's boyfriend; he is invited to drinks with the residents at Akemi's workplace, Cha Cha Maru, where Godai makes a sober confession of love.
12	"Dog Daze" "[Pup Close and Personal]" (Ikigake no Daken (行きがけの駄犬))	August 15, 1981
Kentaro laments summer homework to draw a map of their vacation; Godai, sympathetic, proposes a trip to the beach, accompanied by Ikoku, Kyoko, and Mitaka, whose fear of dogs is revealed when the children sneak Soichiro into his car.
13	"A Salty Dog" "[Salty Dog]" (Sorutī Doggu (ソルティー・ドッグ))	August 30, 1981
At the beach, Mitaka and Godai compete for Kyoko's attention; when Soichiro is washed out to sea, Godai rescues the dog and brings him back to Mitaka's rowboat, compounding the trauma.
14	"Memorial Cooking" (Memoriaru Kukkingu (メモリアル・クッキング))	September 15, 1981
Ikoku comes over for tutoring, which leads to Kyoko cooking her husband Soichiro's favorite dinner; Godai sees parallels in Kentaro's crush on Ikoku, an older girl.
15	"One Entangled Evening" "[A Complicated Evening]" (Fukuzatsu Ya (複雑夜))	September 30, 1981
Godai goes to the movies with former coworker Kozue Nanao instead of Kyoko after seeing her on a date with Mitaka.
16	"1-900-TROUBLE" "[Pink Telephone]" (Momoiro Denwa (桃色電話))	October 15, 1981
Godai starts receiving many calls from girls at Maison Ikkoku, which has only one telephone for the manager, infuriating Kyoko with jealousy. She installs a pink payphone; he mends their relationship by using it to call her and explain why.
17	"With a Little Nonchalance" "[Warm on the Inside, Cool on the Outside]" (Gingiragin ni Sarigenaku (ギンギラギンにさりげなく))	October 30, 1981
Godai asks Kyoko out, but she mixes up the location of their date with that a similarly-named bar where the other tenants are having a party in honor of her first anniversary as manager.
18	"Campus Doll" (Kyanpasu Dōru (キャンパス・ドール))	November 15, 1981
Kyoko attends an arts festival held at Godai's university, where she plays the part of a princess in a puppet show with a flustered Godai as the prince.
19	"Intensive Care" "[When It Sprains, It Pours]" (Kega no Kōmyō Arasoi (ケガの功名争い))	November 30, 1981
After Kyoko sprains her ankle playing tennis, Mitaka, Godai, and the other tenants are a little too solicitous during her recovery.
20	"Shadows on the Heart" "[The Shadow Behind You]" (Kage o Seoite (影を背負いて))	December 15, 1981
Kyoko meets Kozue on a rainy day and reminisces about hiding an umbrella to meet Soichiro when he was a guest lecturer.
21	"Knit-Picking" "[Say It with Scarves]" (Mafu-rā Agemasu (マフ等あげます))	December 30, 1981
Godai searches for a Christmas present for Kyoko, but ends up giving it to Kozue after she knits a hat for him. Kyoko has been busy knitting scarves for each resident.
22	"Ring in the Nude" "[Auld Lang Soba]" (Anata no Soba de (あなたのソバで))	January 15, 1982
Godai and Kyoko spend New Year's Eve together after Akemi, who was supposed to celebrate with them, leaves on a ski trip.
23	""I'll Be Back"" "[The Unreturned]" (Kaerazaru Kare (帰らざる彼))	January 30, 1982
Godai repeatedly delays his return to Maison Ikkoku, as he doesn't want Kyoko to see him with a black eye.
24	"Stake It on the Rink!" "[Put It all in the Rink!]" (Rinku ni Kakero! (リンクに賭けろ!))	February 15, 1982
Godai and Mitaka tag along on Kyoko's skating trip with Kentaro and Ikoku, despite the fact that they're very poor skaters.
25	"Kyoko Baby and Mr. Soichiro" "[Kyoko and Soichiro]" (Kyōko to Sōichirō (響子と惣一郎))	February 28, 1982
Godai is convinced to care of Sakamoto's cat, which is also called Kyoko (after Kyoko Mano), leading to misunderstandings with the other residents.
26	"A Family Affair" "[Portrait of a Family Feud]" (Kazoku no Shōsō (家族の焦燥))	March 15, 1982
Kyoko's parents try to pressure her into leaving Maison Ikkoku.
27	"The Big Announcement" "[Resignation Proclamation]" (Intai Sengen (引退宣言))	March 30, 1982
After Kyoko is late coming home, her mother Ritsuko makes the tenants believe she has quit her job and moved out.
28	"I'm Convinced" (Nattoku Shimashita (納得しました))	April 15, 1982
Ritsuko convinces Mrs. Ichinose that Mr. Chigusa is ill as part of her scheme to make Kyoko move out.
29	"I'll Never Give Up!" "[Bring It On]" (Watashi wa Makenai!! (私は負けない!!))	April 30, 1982
Kyoko is pressured into renouncing the Otonashis and taking back her maiden name during the annual visit to Soichiro's grave. Godai meets Kozue's family.
30	"Mixed (Up) Doubles" "[Mixed-Up Doubles]" (Konran Daburusu (混乱ダブルス))	May 15, 1982
Godai and Kyoko face off with Mitaka and Mrs. Ichinose in a mixed doubles tennis game, at the end of which Mitaka proposes to "pair for life".
31	"Wait Three Years" (Sannen Matte (三年待って))	May 30, 1982
Kyoko learns that both Godai and Mitaka are willing to wait for her.
32	"The Black Widow's Bite" "[The Angry Widow]" (Ikari no Uidō (怒りのウィドウ))	June 15, 1982
Kozue comes to see Godai at Maison Ikkoku; Kyoko meets Mitaka for a date, but sees him holding another woman, and swears off men altogether.
33	"Catch of the Day" "[He's the One]" (Are ga Ii (あれがいい))	June 30, 1982
Kyoko's mother meets Mitaka, gaining her trust, and she approves of Kyoko's job. Godai goes drinking with Kyoko's father, who vows to never let her remarry.
34	"Turn the Other Cheek" "[The Standoff]" (SOPPO)	July 15, 1982
Godai's plan to break up with Kozue is halted before it starts, but he nevertheless stops dining with the Nanao family due to Kyoko's influence. Kyoko plans a date with Mitaka.
35	"Soichiro Turns Around" "[When Soichiro Looked Back]" (Furimuita Sōichirō (ふりむいた惣一郎))	July 30, 1982
Kyoko tells Ikoku how Soichiro (the dog) came to live with Soichiro; after Kentaro loses him during a walk, Godai finds Soichiro and returns him to Kyoko in an oddly nostalgic way.
36	"A Bunch of Mugs" "[The Great Beer Heist]" (Shokkingu Jokki (ショッキング・ジョッキ))	August 15, 1982
Kyoko cooks for Godai and Sakamoto, who invite her to the pub where they are working as thanks. After the other residents join, she ends up drinking too much.
37	"The One That Got Away" "[In a Dark Corner of the Festival]" (Matsuri no Kurai Katasumi de (祭りの暗い片すみで))	August 30, 1982
Godai receives a handmade yukata from his family and wears it to a summer festival with Kyoko, Mitaka, Kozue, and the residents. In a quiet spot, the two couples surprise each other by the light of the fireworks.
38	"Memories of You" "[Summer Memories]" (Natsu no Omoide (夏の思い出))	September 15, 1982
Kozue asks Godai to make a summer memory together; he becomes obsessed that she might mean "doing it", but she just wants him to meet her friends.
39	"The Incident" (Jiken (事件))	September 30, 1982
Rumors that Kyoko accepted Mitaka's proposal are mistakenly confirmed and Godai decides to leave Maison Ikkoku.
40	"A Small Space" "[Small Galaxy]" (Semai Uchū (狭い宇宙))	October 15, 1982
Kyoko explains she was helping Mitaka select a wedding gift for his sister. Godai's new apartment comes with a beautiful surprise named Ayako ... and her yakuza beau.
41	"Recipe for Misunderstanding" "[The Mathematics of Misunderstanding]" (Gokai no Hōteishiki (誤解の方程式))	October 30, 1982
After a month apart, Godai learns the truth from Yotsuya. Kyoko finds Godai's new address and upon hearing directly from Ayako they are living together, coldly wishes him well.
42	"The Light in Room 5" "[The Light in Apartment 5]" (Akarui Gogōshitsu (明るい5号室))	November 15, 1982
Godai explains the situation to the drunken residents at Cha Cha Maru so he can move back, but they mangle the story and Kyoko angrily tells Godai there are no vacancies; afterward, the bartender tells Kyoko the truth.
43	"Down the Home Stretch" "[Partway Down the Slope]" (Saka no Tochū (坂の途中))	November 30, 1982
Godai crashes with Sakamoto for a week and Kyoko imagines the worst. During an unexpected visit to Maison Ikkoku, Godai and Kyoko mend their misunderstanding.
44	"Embraced by Illness" "[Cold Comfort]" (Kaze ni Dakarete (風邪に抱かれて))	December 15, 1982
Godai's incapacitating cold is nursed by the residents and Mitaka. Kyoko arranges to have his belongings returned.
45	"The Man Who Reached for the Stars" "[The Man Who Seized a Star]" (Hoshi o Tsukamu Otoko (星をつかむ男))	December 30, 1982
Godai works part-time to pay Kyoko back, including redecorating a store on Christmas Eve, causing him to miss the start of the annual party, but he finds the right gift, inspired by a childhood memory.
46	"Careful What You Wish For" "[Wishes Come True]" (Negaigoto Kanau (願ひ事かなふ))	January 15, 1983
Godai's plans to spend New Year's alone with Kyoko are disrupted, but he spends the holiday with Kozue and the Nanao family.
47	"The Kissing Scene" "[Reeled with a Kiss]" (Kissu no Aru Jōkei (キッスのある情景))	January 30, 1983
After a breakup, Akemi comes home drunk; when Kyoko enlists Godai's help to bring her inside, she kisses first him, then Kyoko, eventually leading to their first (accidental) kiss thanks to a broken porch light.
48	"No Peeking!" "[I Won't Look]" (Miru Mo no ka (見るものか))	February 15, 1983
Yotsuya enlists Godai's help to peep at Kyoko in her new leotard.
49	"Mixed Messages" "[Very Clever]" (Nante Kiyō na no (なんて器用なの))	February 28, 1983
On Valentine's Day, Kozue gives Godai chocolates and pansies, which Kyoko tends after Godai visits home; upon his return, she presents him with geraniums.
50	"The Better to Hear You With" "[Take Care, Kozue]" (Kozue-chan Ki o Tsukete (こずえちゃん気をつけて))	March 15, 1983
Kozue seeks romantic advice from Mitaka, but their friendship is mistaken for more by Yotsuya and Mrs. Ichinose. Godai inadvertently bolsters Kozue's affection.
51	"Clothes Make the ???" "[Day and Night at Maison Ikkoku]" (Ikkokukan no Hiru to Yoru (一刻館の昼と夜))	March 30, 1983
Kyoko gets a full-length mirror and checks the fit of her old high school uniform, resulting in an impromptu residents' costume party.
52	"Just a Little Card" "[Not-So-Special Delivery]" (Haitatsusareta Ichimai Hagaki (配達された一枚の葉書))	April 15, 1983
After receiving Soichiro's diary, Kyoko is puzzled to find it merely documents Soichiro's meals and not him noticing her, but a postcard he saved from her confirms his emotions.
53	"Oh, Baby" "[Scenes from Parenthood]" (Kodomo no Iru Jōkei (子供のいる情景))	April 30, 1983
Kyoko's mother pointedly asks when she can expect grandchildren; Mitaka and Godai are unhelpful.
54	"A Very Tight Game" "[Sandlot Grandstand]" (Kusayakyū Sutando Kurosu (草野球スタンドクロス))	May 15, 1983
The residents of Maison Ikkoku are recruited for the Cha Cha Maru baseball team; the rivalry between Mitaka and Godai spills onto the diamond.
55	"Shall We...Rest Awhile?" "[Want to Rest Awhile?]" (Chotto Yasumō ka (ちょっと休もうか))	May 30, 1983
At separate parties in Shinjuku, Kyoko reunites with friends and Sakamoto and Godai are paired up with Jun and Eri; after Eri has too much to drink, Kyoko's intervention saves her from ending up in a love hotel with Godai.
56	"Grandma Goes to Town" "[Grandma in Tokio]" (Bāchan in Tokio)	June 15, 1983
Granny Godai visits and mends the latest rift with her plain-spoken approach; at a reunion, Granny's friends mistake Kyoko as Godai's wife.
57	"Stop Following Me!" "[Don't Follow Me]" (Donto Forō Mī (Don't フォローミー))	June 30, 1983
When Yotsuya tells Granny about Kozue, she invites herself along on their date; she recalls Godai's wishy-washy indecisiveness and decides to stay with him for a while.
58	"Come on a My House" "[Come on-a My House]" (Kamona Mai Hausu (カモナマイハウス))	July 15, 1983
Mitaka, believing Granny is Kyoko's grandmother, invites her to his apartment. On the way back, Granny explains she also had to choose between devotion and riches.
59	"Granny's Ol' Plum Wine" "[Grandma Plum Wine]" (Umeshu Babaa (梅酒婆あ))	July 30, 1983
At Maison Ikkoku, the residents share Granny's homemade umeshu; Godai and Soichiro find themselves at odds over Kyoko.
60	"Playing Hickey" "[Poolside Hickey]" (Japanese: Pūrusaido no Kisu Māku (プールサイドのキスマーク))	August 15, 1983
To repay the residents for their kindness, Granny invites them to a hotel pool; Godai, bearing an accidental hickey, becomes the target of Kyoko's jealousy (and teeth).
61	"A Hot Wind" "[On Summer-Colored Winds]" (Natsuiro no Kaze to (夏色の風と))	August 30, 1983
Godai escapes to Hokkaido, where he meets chatterbox Konatsu Oguchi while writing a letter to Kyoko; at the end of their travels together, he inadvertently rips up his return ticket along with the letter declaring Kyoko is the only one for him.
62	"Well, Well, Well" "[In the Well]" (Ido no Naka (井戸の中))	September 15, 1983
Kyoko and Godai accidentally end up in an abandoned well together while playing demons for the summer festival. Eventually, the other residents and Mitaka join them rather than help.
63	"Prune-faced Cupid" "[Wrinkled Cupid]" (Shiwa no Aru Kyūpiddo (しわのあるキューピッド))	September 30, 1983
Granny arranges a date between Godai and Kyoko; they soon learn her detailed itinerary is meant to allow the other residents to stalk them.
Lost–Episode	"Yusaku's Island" "[Ikkoku Isle Maroon-ly Hearts Club]" (Ikkokujima Nanpa Shimatsuki (一刻島ナンパ始末記))	August 20, 1983
Stranded on an apparently deserted island after sinking Mitaka's boat, the residents find a way to survive. Yotsuya, who scouted the island, neglected to tell the others there is an inn on the other side of the ridge.
64	"Farewell on Platform 18" "[Parting on Platform 18]" (Wakare no Jūhachi-ban Hōmu (別れの18番ホーム))	October 15, 1983
Granny has an extended farewell party thanks to mechanical and scheduling breakdowns at the train station.
65	"Mr. Ichinose Gets Laid Off" "[Mr. Ichinose Gets the Sack]" (Ichinose-shi no Shitsugyō (一の瀬氏の失業))	October 30, 1983
After Mr. Ichinose's company goes bankrupt, he meets the other residents, who also witness the caring side of Mrs. Ichinose.
66	"Run, Ichinose, Run" "[Mr. Ichinose on the Run]" (Ichinose-shi, Hashiru (一の瀬氏、走る))	November 15, 1983
For Field Day, Kentaro asks Kyoko to run with Godai in a three-legged race, fearing his mom's partying could impair his parents' performance, but under a promise to stay sober, the Ichinoses prevail.
67	"Falling for You" "[In Falling Too]" (Ochiteiku no mo (落ちていくのも))	November 30, 1983
Godai feels trapped into being with Kozue by not being more assertive and makes a plan to break up, but fails to follow through. After returning to Maison Ikkoku, he quarrels with Kyoko over her jealousy and ends up breaking a leg.
68	"No Visitors, Please!" "[Pity Party]" (Enkai Shazetsu (宴会謝絶))	December 15, 1983
Kyoko visits Godai in the hospital daily, swearing she will not get jealous; during their first opportunity alone, they nearly kiss, but are interrupted by the arrival of his cousin Akira.
69	"Mission Impossible: The Party Cracker Case" "[Can't Elope]" (Kakeochi Kurakkā (駆け落ちクラッカー))	December 30, 1983
The residents plan to help Akira elope on Christmas Eve; Godai leaves his bed to relay her father's blessing and falls down the stairs, re-fracturing his leg.
70	"Body of Love" "[Anatomy of Love]" (Ai no Kokkaku (愛の骨格))	January 15, 1984
Kyoko volunteers to tend Godai over the New Year; outside, on a walk, Godai stumbles and they embrace. When they return to the room, Mitaka has joined as a roommate, having broken his leg while skiing.
71	"Message in the Snow" "[Writing in the Snow]" (Yuki ni Futamoji (雪に二文字))	January 30, 1984
Godai and Mitaka continue to pitch woo while bedridden; after her nursing is made redundant by Mitaka's female students and Kozue, she writes "idiots" in the snow outside their window.
72	"Mending a Break" "[Love and Rehabilitation]" (Ai no Rihabiritēshon (愛のリハビリテーション))	February 15, 1984
After their discharge, Mitaka and Godai bond over Kyoko's seemingly unreasonable jealousy.
73	"Just Do Your Best!" "[Good Luck!]" (Ganbatte Kudasai ne (がんばってくださいね))	February 29, 1984
Fearing he could fail his finals, Kyoko halts the residents' nightly parties in Godai's room, but he still oversleeps and misses his last final, forcing him to spend an extra year; Kyoko says she'll wait for him.
74	"In Hot Water" "[The Bathing Party]" (Tōjisha-tachi (湯治者たち))	March 15, 1984
Granny treats the residents to an onsen trip. Godai spends a restless night wrestling with his temptations and the others.
75	"Going Shopping in a Suit" "[Suiting Up]" (Sūtsu de Otsukai (スーツでおつかい))	March 30, 1984
Kyoko is recalled home for a few days to take care of her sick mother, which stretches into a week; Godai helps with a special delivery and hints at his crush, which her parents misinterpret.
76	"The Face in the Darkness" "[A Face in the Dark]" (Yami no Naka no Kao (闇の中の顔))	April 15, 1984
Godai visits the Otonashis to celebrate Ikoku's admission to high school; overnight, he is tempted to check Soichiro's portrait on the family altar.
77	"A Grave Matter" "[Spring Grave]" (Haru no Haka (春の墓))	April 30, 1984
On the fourth anniversary of Soichiro's funeral, Kyoko realizes her acute grief has passed and she asks his forgiveness in moving on.
78	"One Big Happy Family" "[Let's Live Together]" (Issho ni Sumō ne (一緒に住もうね))	May 15, 1984
Nozomu Nikaido moves into long-vacant Room 2; when the residents play pranks on him, he vows revenge.
79	"Attack and Counterattack" "[Jab and Twist]" (Jabbu to Utchari (ジャブ&うっちゃり))	May 30, 1984
Nikaido tries to pull multiple pranks on Yotsuya, but he stays one step ahead each time.
80	"Can't We Be Friends?" "[Like a House on Fire]" (Nakiyoki Koto wa (仲よき事は))	June 15, 1984
Kyoko forms a mistaken opinion of Nikaido as a shy, meek resident; Yotsuya stages a scene where she learns the truth.
81	"Even if We're Caught in the Rain" "[Raindrops Keep Fallin' on My Head]" (Ame ni Nurete mo (雨に濡れても))	June 30, 1984
Nikaido meets Kozue and spreads a rumor that Godai is about to propose to her.
82	"Total Insensitivity" "[Overinsensitive]" (Shinkei Kabi (神経過微))	July 15, 1984
Kozue takes Nikaido to dinner instead of Godai, who becomes jealous over his apparent replacement, leading to another misunderstanding with kyoko.
83	"Nothing...Nothing at All!" "[It's Nothing]" (Nandemo Arimasen (なんでもありません))	July 30, 1984
Nikaido guilelessly tries to repair the latest rift between Godai and Kyoko; after being fed 126 clues by the residents, he realizes they love each other, which they quickly deny.
84	"The Scramble Kid" (Sukuranburu Kiddo (スクランブル・キッド))	August 15, 1984
Mitaka is flattered when Nikaido calls Kyoko his girlfriend, but grows concerned upon hearing the news that Godai has a ring for her.
85	"Qué Será, Será..." "[Withering on the Vine]" (Aota Gare (青田枯れ))	August 30, 1984
Godai's fruitless job search leads to a trip home to ask for the family restaurant; Kyoko assumes he is requesting permission from his parents to marry her.
86	"Vanity Recruit" "[Fake It till You Make It]" (Mie Rikurūto (見栄リクルート))	September 15, 1984
Mitaka invites Kyoko and the residents for a pool party at a hotel where Godai is working part-time, though he lied and said he had job interviews instead; when she loses her top, Godai manages to save the day.
87	"Man vs. Maiden" "[Versus Maiden]" (Basasu Otome (VS.乙女))	September 30, 1984
Grandpa Otonashi secures a student teaching position in literature for Godai at Kyoko's old high school, where he meets Ibuki Yagami, the 2-4 Class Rep, who mistakes his fatigue for a tragic history.
88	"Kokoro"; Transliteration: "Kokoro (こころ)"	October 15, 1984
After Godai's lesson on Kokoro, Yagami invites herself to Maison Ikkoku and meets Kyoko. A pointed question about the plot leads to Kyoko receiving a photograph of Godai and Yagami.
89	"Instructions for the Guidance and Supervision of the Annual Sports Festival" "[Guidance and Supervision on Sports Day]" (Taiikusai no Shidō to Kanri (体育祭の指導と管理))	October 30, 1984
The annual sports day marks the end of the student teaching period; Yagami takes advantage as Class Rep to spend time with Godai and lures him into a compromising situation.
90	"Pajama Party" "[The Pajama Project]" (Pajama de Ojama (パジャマでお邪魔))	November 15, 1984
Learning that Kyoko married her teacher, Yagami is inspired to cook lunch for Godai at Maison Ikkoku, then lingers behind to spend the night.
91	"Peejays and Negligees" "[Nightie Night]" (Pajama to Negurije (パジャマとネグリジェ))	November 30, 1984
Kyoko puts Yagami up overnight with her; because Kyoko claims Godai's love is unrequited, Yagami gains new hope instead of discouragement.
92	"The Long Good-Bye" (Rongu Guddobai (ロング・グッドバイ))	December 15, 1984
Yagami's infatuation appears to have passed with the end of the student teaching period, but she shows up at Maison Ikkoku that night to amend her farewell.
93	"Just One Wish" (Hitotsu Dake Onegai (ひとつだけお願い))	December 30, 1984
Godai's puppetry club connections lead to a Christmas show at Acorn preschool, co-starring with Kyoko in a rags-to-rags story with real-life parallels.
94	"Kimono Connection" "[Furisode Connection]" (Furisode Konekushon (振り袖コネクション))	January 15, 1985
Godai learns Yagami's father is the personnel manager for Mitsutomo Enterprises, one of the places he has applied, and makes a strong impression after taking her home.
95	"Birth Is Never as Hard as the Worrying" "[Disorganized Labor]" (Anzuru yori Umu ga Yasushi (案ずるより産むが易し))	January 30, 1985
Godai misses his interview with Mitsutomo while helping a woman deliver her first baby.
96	"Post-Partum Depression" "[Postpartum Aggression]" (Sango no Haradachi (産後の腹立ち))	February 15, 1985
Yagami and her father show up at Maison Ikkoku, demanding answers for why Godai missed the interview, learning the truth from the husband and new father, who thanks Godai in person.
97	"The Midnight Interview" (Shin'ya no Mensetsu (深夜の面接))	February 28, 1985
Yagami has moved into Godai's Room 5 to protest her father's recalcitrance and Godai stays with Nikaido; Kyoko threatens to share her room with Godai, who is waylaid by the Ibukis.
98	"Beyond Love and Hate" (Onshū no Kanata (恩讐の彼方))	March 15, 1985
Mr. Ibuki uses Kasumi Inc., a subsidiary of Mitsutomo, to hire Godai and Yagami returns home after Godai confesses his love for Kyoko to him.
99	"Rose-Colored Glasses" "[La Vie en Rose]" (Barairo no Jinsei (バラ色の人生))	March 30, 1985
With a job offer, Godai prepares to propose to Kyoko and she wonders how she will react. Kasumi goes bankrupt.
100	"Lost in the Blossoms" "[Sakura Maze]" (Sakura Meiro (桜迷路))	April 15, 1985
Godai instead starts temporary work at a pre-school after graduation. When Kyoko visits after the annual visit to Soichiro's grave, they share a moment together amongst the cherry blossoms.
101	"Lucky Day" "[A Date with Disaster]" (Taian Butsumetsu (大安仏滅))	April 30, 1985
Mitaka's uncle arranges a meeting with Asuna Kujo, a prospective fiancée, which Mitaka uses to pressure Kyoko. Godai makes plans to apply for a teaching license in two years.
102	"'I Love Dogs' • I" (Inu ga Suki Pāto Wan (「犬が好き」Part I))	May 15, 1985
Kyoko decides to start making lunch for Godai, who seems to have no time any more, and meets Asuna through their dogs. Mitaka requests an answer to his proposal in one week.
103	"'I Love Dogs' • II" (Inu ga Suki Pāto Tsū (「犬が好き」Part II))	May 30, 1985
Bashful Asuna cannot work up the courage to ask Kyoko to turn down Mitaka and Kyoko is infuriated when Godai stays out all night with Sakamoto instead of stopping her from accepting Mitaka's proposal, but their meeting is delayed by Asuna's dogs.
104	"Love You Lots" "[I Like You Very Much]" (Tottemo Suki Da yo (とっても好きだよ))	June 15, 1985
Godai records two messages: one for his pre-school student (also named Kyoko), gently rejecting her proposal, and another for Kyoko, giving his true feelings. He mixes them up during the delivery.
105	"Send in the Hounds" "[Day of the Dog]" (Inu ga Kita (犬が来た))	June 30, 1985
Mitaka tells Kyoko he will break off the arrangement with Asuna for her, but instead he embraces Asuna on their date when the dogs catch up to them.
106	"The Door's Still Open" "[The Opened Door]" (Hirakareta Tobira (開かれた扉))	July 15, 1985
Mitaka seizes the opportune illness to ask Kyoko to visit; Godai and Asuna catch them in a suggestive posture, sparked by one of Asuna's dogs.
107	"The Door Slams" "[The Closed Door]" (Tojirareta Tobira (閉じられた扉))	July 30, 1985
Kyoko attempts to explain the situation to Godai, he lies and says he has no feelings for her, offering congratulations for her assumed engagement to Mitaka. She asks if he will be okay if she leaves.
108	"Twin Journeys" "[A Shared Departure]" (Futari no Tabidachi (二人の旅立ち))	August 15, 1985
With Mitaka apologizing and saying he can't see her, unattached Kyoko sets off on vacation. Godai grabs her posted itinerary and races to catch up, not realizing they are on the same train.
109	"Party of Two" (Dōgyō Ninin (同行二人))	August 30, 1985
In Kanazawa, Kyoko meets a fellow single woman who had given a copy of her travel itinerary to her ex, hoping he would give chase, to no avail. Meanwhile, Godai's frequent visits to check Kyoko's inn leads to a police interview.
110	"Steamy Love" "[Silhouette Romance]" (Shiruetto Romansu (シルエット・ロマンス))	September 15, 1985
Kyoko believes she keeps catching glimpses of Godai, chalking it up to wishful thinking; finally, they end up at the same onsen near Wajima.
111	"One Night Dream" "[One Night's Dreaming]" (Yume Ichiya (夢一夜))	September 30, 1985
After Godai collapses from heat, he is carried into Kyoko's room; he fails to tell her the truth, but she is comforted by the thought he pursued her until she is called back to Maison Ikkoku.
112	"Back to...School?" "[Autumn Ambush]" (Aki no Wana (秋の罠))	October 15, 1985
Yagami hires Godai as a private tutor, after borrowing a brother.
113	"Homework" "[Love by Formula]" (Chātoshiki Ren'ai (チャート式恋愛))	October 30, 1985
Because the environment at Maison Ikkoku is not conducive for study, Yagami proposes a session at her house instead.
114	"If the Shoe Fits" "[Sneakers at the Window]" (Madobe no Sunīkā (窓辺のスニーカー))	November 15, 1985
When Yagami's parents come home unexpectedly, Godai is forced to sneak out the window, leaving his shoes behind and giving Yagami another excuse to visit.
115	"Drop the Other Shoe" "[The Kickoff]" (Kikku Ofu (キック・オフ))	November 30, 1985
Yagami arrives at Maison Ikkoku for a session with her new tutor, Yotsuya. She is lectured at school for her decreasing grades, prompted by Kyoko's concerned visit.
116	"Vertigo" (Memai (めまい))	December 15, 1985
Yagami collapses at Maison Ikkoku, exhausted; later, Yagami confronts Kyoko and accuses her of not being aware of how Kyoko feels about Godai.
117	"Chicken!" "[Coward]" (Yowamushi (弱虫))	December 30, 1985
At the Christmas party, Yagami and Kyoko get drunk together; Yagami says Kyoko is afraid of losing Godai to her, and Kyoko replies her fear is admitting she loves Godai means her love for Soichiro was a lie.
118	"Hair o' the Dog" "[Shrines and Canines]" (Inu Mōde (犬詣))	January 15, 1986
Mitaka has been overcoming his phobia of dogs. During the New Year's shrine visit, Godai and Kyoko are puzzled when he pets Soichiro.
119	"Oh, You Lucky Dog" "[Doggy Holiday]" (Doggu Horidē (ドッグ・ホリデー))	January 30, 1986
Mitaka's uncle forces him to visit Asuka and asks Kyoko to break things off with him.
120	"Like Bubbles on the Breeze" "[Soap Bubbles in the Air]" (Shabondama Tonda (シャボン玉 翔んだ))	February 15, 1986
Mitaka's frequent visits to the Kujos are noticed; the recession forces Acorn preschool to lay off Godai.
121	"The Sun Will Shine" "[Confession in the Sun]" (Hidamari no Kokuhaku (陽だまりの告白))	February 28, 1986
Neglecting to tell Kyoko he is unemployed for fear of disappointing her, Godai misses a substitute teaching opportunity and is further shamed when she packs a bento for him.
122	"Silence Is Golden (Or at Least Very Expensive)" "[Silence is the Golden Ticket]" (Chinmoku wa Kanezuru (沈黙は金ヅル))	March 15, 1986
Godai starts part time work as a tout for the Bunny Club cabaret. When Yotsuya discovers his new position, the residents extort Godai for their silence.
123	"Coming Clean" "[Discovery]" (Hakkaku (発覚))	March 30, 1986
Nikaido and then Kyoko are the last to discover Godai's Bunny Club job, though he still insists on telling her the truth on his own schedule.
124	"Mr. Godai Regrets (He Is Unable to Lunch Today)" "[A Sorry Lunch Box]" (Gomen ne Ranchi Bokkusu (ごめんねLunch・Box))	April 14, 1986
When Kyoko learns the truth about why Godai was laid off from Acorn preschool, she fixes him one last bento.
125	"Good Mourning" "[Parting in Love and Sadness]" (Ai to Kanashimi no Hadan (愛と哀しみの破談))	April 21, 1986
Mitaka tells Godai he will not allow Godai to doom Kyoko to a life of poverty and tries to break up with Asuna. Godai finds a new role as the club babysitter.
126	"The Chrysanthemum and the Building Block" (Kiku to Tsumiki (菊と積木))	April 28, 1986
Godai and Mitaka visit Soichiro's grave in secret, hiding when Kyoko and the Otonashis arrive, but leaving clues behind.
127	"Back from the Grave" "[From the Shadow of the Grave]" (Kusaba no Kage kara (草葉の陰から))	May 5, 1986
Overhearing his praises, Mitaka reveals himself; Kyoko stays behind to talk privately with Soichiro about the man she is planning to remarry, but soon realizes that Godai is listening.
128	"Never Let You Go" "[I Won't Let You Get Away!]" (Nigashite Tamaru ka!! (逃がしてたまるか!!))	May 12, 1986
Asuna surprises Mitaka as a new tennis student.
129	"The Age of Innocence" "[Kids and Effect]" (Enkon Kankei (縁困関係))	May 19, 1986
Mitaka's uncle enlists Mitaka's parents' help to ensure he stays with Asuka. At the club, Kasumi elopes with a customer, leaving her children Taro and Hanako with Godai.
130	"The Trouble with Girls...and Boys" "[Out of the Mouths of Babes]" (Nani mo Shiranai Kodomotachi (なにも知らない子供たち))	May 26, 1986
Godai and Kyoko care for the children with help from Mrs. Ichinose. Mitaka arranges a meeting between his parents and the Chigusas.
131	"Stars in Your Eyes" "[Star-Crossed Mother]" (Chikai no Boshi Boshi (誓いの母子星))	June 2, 1986
Godai finds Kasumi's apartment, but she flees and says she'll return in a week. Taro remains cheerful, recalling a promise Kasumi made on a star.
132	"Help Me!" "[A Call for Help]" (Herupu Mī Kōru (Help Me コール))	June 9, 1986
Kyoko goes to a dinner ostensibly with her family, but is surprised when Mitaka comes to drive her. However, Taro stows away in the car and Kyoko begs Godai to retrieve him.
133	"Treacherous Night" "[Danger in the Night]" (Abunai Yoru (あぶない夜))	June 23, 1986
Kyoko plays up her age and widowhood in an attempt to drive off Mitaka's parents, but it backfires, as they are charmed by her honesty. When Godai arrives, Mitaka drives away with Kyoko and takes her to a hotel.
134	"No Sleep...Until Morning" "[Sleepless till Dawn]" (Asa made Nemurenai (朝まで眠れない))	July 7, 1986
Mr. Chigusa arrives at Maison Ikkoku; learning that Kyoko has not returned, Godai joins him as they search for her. Kyoko finally tells Mitaka she can't and he sends her home in a taxi.
135	"Shadows in the Sunlight" "[In Broad Daylight]" (Hakuchū no Giwaku (白昼の疑惑))	July 21, 1986
Returning to Maison Ikkoku in the morning, Godai and Mr. Chigusa are surprised to see Kyoko; each have their suspicions, but Kyoko says nothing happened. Taro pages Kasumi, who is running late; she had arrived and partied with the residents during the chaos the night before.
136	"100% Sure" "[The Men from the Boys]" (Hyaku Pāsento Shōnen-ba (100%SHONEN場))	August 4, 1986
Mitaka's uncle handles the wedding arrangements with the Kujos; when Mitaka learns, he tries to break it off with Asuna. Godai and Mitaka prepare for a fight.
137	"We Have Met the Enemy" "[Coming to Blows]" (Mukaeuchi (迎えうち))	August 18, 1986
Godai and Mitaka are unable to find a suitable place to fight, so they start drinking together to avoid the police. Learning that Godai's teaching license exam is tomorrow, Mitaka calls it off and stumbles home, drunk, where Asuna is waiting.
138	"A Fate Sealed" "[A Fateful Night]" (Kizashi (きざし))	September 1, 1986
Kyoko greets Godai at the station with a slap, angry that he chose to go drinking. After learning he wants to cancel the engagement, Asuna agrees, then helps him into his condo, where they spend the night.
139	"Back and Forth" "[Wavering Hearts]" (Yureru Kokoro (揺れる心))	September 15, 1986
Godai's prolonged absence leaves the residents of Maison Ikkoku speculating about his latest failure; when he returns, he tells them he will move into the Bunny Club temporarily to prepare for the practical portion.
140	"Thanks...for Everything" "[Hello]" (Dōmo (どうも))	September 29, 1986
Asuna learns her dog is pregnant from the night they spent at Mitaka's condo; misremembering that he slept with Asuna and misunderstanding that she is pregnant, Mitaka promises to marry her.
141	"The Happiness Curve" (Shiawase Kyokusen (しあわせ曲線))	October 13, 1986
Mitaka withdraws his proposal to Kyoko. At their engagement party, he learns the truth when Asuna asks about puppy names.
142	"One More Round" "[One More Period]" (Wan Moa Piriodo (ワンモア・ピリオド))	October 27, 1986
Mitaka finds Godai at the club for a frank talk; Mitaka wants to ensure Kyoko will be happy. Asuna correctly perceives Mitaka's disappointment and tries to cheer him up.
143	"Twists Upon Twists" "[Whirl-Brained Romance]" (Tomadoi Romansu (戸惑いロマンス))	November 10, 1986
Kozue considers a marriage proposal and accompanies Kyoko to the club to visit Godai. At the train station, Kozue kisses Godai for the first time and wishes him good luck on his upcoming exam.
144	"Can't You Understand?" "[Please Understand]" (Wakatte Kudasai (わかってください))	November 24, 1986
Godai meets Kozue, who tells him she received a marriage proposal and that she will wait for his license exam results; he says he intends to make his own proposal, which she misunderstands is for her. Kyoko, who saw the kiss, confronts Godai coldly.
145	"Turnabout" "[Reversal of Fortune]" (Daigyakuten (大逆転))	December 8, 1986
Godai explains he fell for a childhood trick and Kyoko uses it to kiss him. That night, Kozue returns to Maison Ikkoku and tearfully confesses she could not turn down the other proposal even though Godai also proposed. Kyoko demands that he moves out.
146	"The First Move" "[Runaway Excess]" (Detatoko Shōbu (出たとこ勝負))	January 8, 1987
Instead, Kyoko packs up and moves in with her parents, rejecting Godai when he calls in person.
147	"Suddenly Kyoko" "[The Accidental Manager]" (Ikinari Kanrin'in (いきなり管理人))	January 15, 1987
Without Kyoko's attention, living conditions deteriorate at Maison Ikkoku after five days. Grandpa Otonashi hires Godai as the temporary manager, and he stops visiting the Chigusas just as Kyoko's heart begins to soften.
148	"Shame!" "[Unsavory Associations]" (Yamashii Kankei (やましい関係))	January 22, 1987
Kyoko visits Cha Cha Maru, where Akemi offers to sleep with Godai; she drops by Maison Ikkoku and sees Godai working as the manager. At the club, he receives a cryptic call from Akemi directing him to a love hotel to settle an unpaid bill.
149	"The Love Hotel Incident" (Rabu Hoteru Jijō (ラブホテル事情))	January 29, 1987
While leaving, Godai and Akemi run into Kozue, who walks away, shocked. Mrs. Ichinose asks Kyoko to return, mentioning that Kyoko that Kozue has split with Godai. On the way, Kyoko goes to a cafe with Kozue, who tells her she saw them leaving the love hotel together.
150	"The Most Important Detail" "[I Love You, So ...]" (Suki Dakara... (好きだから…))	February 2, 1987
Kyoko detours to Cha Cha Maru and confronts Akemi, who confirms Kozue's story. Kyoko quits, enraged, and runs out; Godai catches up and tells her how all the regretful misunderstandings never caused his love to waver. They pause in front of a love hotel.
151	"I Love You, But..." (Suki na no ni... (好きなのに…))	February 9, 1987
Kyoko and Godai enter, intending to spend a few hours, but leave after Soichiro (the dog) is confused with Soichiro (the husband). Kozue learns the truth about Akemi and Godai from Nikaido.
152	"The Truth" (Hontō no Koto (本当のこと))	February 16, 1987
Kozue visits Godai at the Bunny Club; walking back to the station, Godai apologizes and breaks up with her, saying he loves someone else and Kozue, relieved, tells him she accepted the other proposal.
153	"Sacred Vows" "[Vows]" (Chigiri (契り))	February 23, 1987
Godai confesses he was scared that Kyoko was thinking of Soichiro; in turn, she says she will never forget Soichiro, but she also doesn't want another Soichiro. At Maison Ikkoku, they finish what they had started at the love hotel. Kyoko tells Godai she has loved him for a long time.
154	"Love Call"; Transliteration: "Teru Yū Suīto" (Japanese: Tel You Sweet)	March 2, 1987
The day that Godai learns his test results, he promises to call with the results; the pessimistic residents prepare for a sympathy party, but confident Kyoko tells Mrs. Ichinose it would be perfect if he passes and proposes to her.
155	"Wait for Me Tonight" "[Waiting Tonight]" (Kon'ya Matteru (今夜 待ってる))	March 9, 1987
To celebrate, the residents party for a week, preventing Godai from proposing. The first night they have free together, Godai's plans are interrupted by Sakamoto, mourning his poverty and latest breakup, and the next few, the residents resume partying. When Kyoko and Godai finally have a moment, the residents congratulate them.
156	"Sympathy" "[Unfortunate People]" (Fukō na Hitobito (不幸な人々))	March 16, 1987
Godai is referred to several preschools by the principal at Acorn, but is rejected by each in turn; however, a position opens at Acorn itself.
157	"...If It Ever Happens" "[I Forbid It]" (Yurusan (許さん))	March 23, 1987
Kyoko continues to wait for a proposal, which a nervous Godai fumbles in his characteristically indirect manner.
158	"Promises" (Yakusoku (約束))	March 30, 1987
Mr. Chigusa leaves his sickbed to meet Godai at the Bunny Club, collapsing after fervently declaring Kyoko will not remarry. The cabaret staff hold a farewell party for Godai; afterward, he finally proposes, promising never to make her cry. Kyoko asks only that he outlive her because she can't endure being left alone again.
159	"Heirlooms" "[The Memento]" (Katami (形見))	April 6, 1987
Godai takes Kyoko to meet his parents, where she helps at the busy restaurant. Granny Godai gives her savings to Yusaku for the wedding and provides an heirloom ring, which she had received from her husband, for Yusaku to properly propose to Kyoko.
160	"Beneath the Cherry Tree" "[Under the Sakura]" (Sakura no Shita de (桜の下で))	April 13, 1987
Just before their wedding, Kyoko and Godai prepare to move in together. Kyoko returns Soichiro's belongings to the Otonashis, promising to stop looking backward, and Godai visits Soichiro's grave, saying he is grateful for Soichiro's influence on her.
161	"P.S. Ikkoku" "[P.S. Maison Ikkoku]" (Pī Esu Ikkokukan (P.S.一刻館))	April 20, 1987
Godai and Kyoko are married and hold their reception at Cha Cha Maru. Some time later, they return to Maison Ikkoku, whispering to newborn Haruka this is where they first met.

== Volume releases ==
=== Japan ===
==== Fifteen volume release format (Big Comics) ====
Fifteen volume release
Volume no.	Subtitle	Chapters	Tankōbon		Shinsōban	
Volume no.	Subtitle	Chapters	Release	ISBN	Release	ISBN
1	Will the Cherry Blossoms Bloom!? (サクラサクカ!?, Sakurasakuka!?)	1–10	May 1, 1982	4-09-180451-9	April 27, 2007	978-4-09-181265-0
2	Mitaka, Godai!! (三鷹、五代!!)	11–21	July 1, 1982	4-09-180452-7	April 27, 2007	978-4-09-181266-7
3	Wait Three Years (三年待って, 3 san-nen matte)	22–32	May 1, 1983	4-09-180453-5	April 27, 2007	978-4-09-181267-4
4	Midway on the Hill (坂の途中, Saka no Tochū)	33–43	June 1, 1983	4-09-180454-3	May 30, 2007	978-4-09-181268-1
5	Noon and Night at Ikkokukan (一刻館の昼と夜, Ikkoku-kan no hiru to yoru)	44–53	January 1, 1984	4-09-180455-1	May 30, 2007	978-4-09-181269-8
6	With a Summer Wind (夏色の風と, Natsuiro no kaze to)	54–63, Lost episode	June 1, 1984	4-09-180456-X	June 29, 2007	978-4-09-181270-4
7	Body of Love (愛の骨格, Ai no kokkaku)	64–73	September 1, 1984	4-09-180457-8	June 29, 2007	978-4-09-181272-8
8	A Spring Grave (春の墓, Haru no haka)	74–84	February 1, 1985	4-09-180458-6	July 30, 2007	978-4-09-181273-5
9	Vs. Maiden (VS.乙女, VS. Otome)	85–95	September 1, 1985	4-09-180459-4	July 30, 2007	978-4-09-181274-2
10	Blossom Labyrinth (桜迷路, Sakura meiro)	86–106	May 1, 1986	4-09-180460-8	August 30, 2007	978-4-09-181275-9
11	One Night Dream (夢一夜, Yumehitoyo)	107–117	July 1, 1986	4-09-180891-3	August 30, 2007	978-4-09-181276-6
12	From the Shadow of the Grass (草葉の陰から, Kusabanokage kara)	118–129	October 1, 1986	4-09-180892-1	September 28, 2007	978-4-09-181277-3
13	Dangerous Night (あぶない夜, Abunai yoru)	130–140	February 1, 1987	4-09-180893-X	September 28, 2007	978-4-09-181278-0
14	I Love You, But... (好きなのに…, Sukinanoni…)	141–151	June 1, 1987	4-09-180894-8	October 30, 2007	978-4-09-181279-7
15	Under the Cherry Tree (桜の下で, Sakura no shita de)	152–161	July 1, 1987	4-09-180895-6	October 30, 2007	978-4-09-181280-3

==== Ten volume release format (Big Spirits Comics Wide Edition & Shogakukan Bunko) ====
Ten volume release
Volume no.	Chapters	Wideban		Bunkoban	
Volume no.	Chapters	Release	ISBN	Release	ISBN
1	1–16	July 30, 1992	4-09-183801-4	December 5, 1996	4-09-192171-X
2	17–33	August 29, 1992	4-09-183802-2	December 5, 1996	4-09-192172-8
3	34–48	September 30, 1992	4-09-183803-0	January 17, 1997	4-09-192173-6
4	49–63, Lost episode	October 30, 1992	4-09-183804-9	January 17, 1997	4-09-192174-4
5	64–78	November 30, 1992	4-09-183805-7	February 15, 1997	4-09-192175-2
6	79–95	December 19, 1992	4-09-183806-5	February 15, 1997	4-09-192176-0
7	96–111	Janarury 30, 1993	4-09-183807-3	March 15, 1997	4-09-192177-9
8	112–128	February 27, 1993	4-09-183808-1	March 15, 1997	4-09-192178-7
9	129–145	March 30, 1993	4-09-183809-X	April 17, 1997	4-09-192179-5
10	146–161	April 28, 1993	4-09-183810-3	April 17, 1997	4-09-192180-9

=== North America ===
==== Comic books ====
During the original release in comic book format, some of the original Japanese chapters (ch. 3, 4, 5, and 6, which would have been in Part 1; and ch. 24, which would have been in Part 2) were skipped. These later were collected and published as "Maison Ikkoku: The Lost Episodes" in Animerica Extra, volume 3, issues 1 and 2.

Viz Media comic book release
Volume		Release date	Ref.
Part 1	Issue 1	June 1992	
Part 1	Issue 2	July 1992	
Part 1	Issue 3	August 1992	
Part 1	Issue 4	September 1992	
Part 1	Issue 5	October 1992	
Part 1	Issue 6	November 1992	
Part 1	Issue 7	December 1992	
Part 2	Issue 1	January 1993	
Part 2	Issue 2	February 1993	
Part 2	Issue 3	March 1993	
Part 2	Issue 4	April 1993	
Part 2	Issue 5	May 1993	
Part 2	Issue 6	June 1993	
Part 3	Issue 1	July 1993	
Part 3	Issue 2	August 1993	
Part 3	Issue 3	September 1993	
Part 3	Issue 4	October 1993	
Part 3	Issue 5	November 1993	
Part 3	Issue 6	December 1993	
Part 4	Issue 1	January 1994	
Part 4	Issue 2	February 1994	
Part 4	Issue 3	April 1994	
Part 4	Issue 4	May 1994	
Part 4	Issue 5	June 1994	
Part 4	Issue 6	July 1994	
Part 4	Issue 7	August 1994	
Part 4	Issue 8	September 1994	
Part 4	Issue 9	October 1994	
Part 4	Issue 10	November 1994	
Part 5	Issue 1	November 1995	
Part 5	Issue 2	December 1995	
Part 5	Issue 3	January 1996	
Part 5	Issue 4	February 1996	
Part 5	Issue 5	March 1996	
Part 5	Issue 6	April 1996	
Part 5	Issue 7	May 1996	
Part 5	Issue 8	June 1996	
Part 5	Issue 9	July 1996	
Part 6	Issue 1	August 1996	
Part 6	Issue 2	September 1996	
Part 6	Issue 3	October 1996	
Part 6	Issue 4	November 1996	
Part 6	Issue 5	December 1996	
Part 6	Issue 6	January 1997	
Part 6	Issue 7	February 1997	
Part 6	Issue 8	March 1997	
Part 6	Issue 9	April 1997	
Part 6	Issue 10	May 1997	
Part 6	Issue 11	June 1997	
Part 7	Issue 1	July 1997	
Part 7	Issue 2	August 1997	
Part 7	Issue 3	September 1997	
Part 7	Issue 4	October 1997	
Part 7	Issue 5	November 1997	
Part 7	Issue 6	December 1997	
Part 7	Issue 7	January 1998	
Part 7	Issue 8	February 1998	
Part 7	Issue 9	March 1998	
Part 7	Issue 10	April 1998	
Part 7	Issue 11	May 1998	
Part 7	Issue 12	June 1998	
Part 7	Issue 13	July 1998	
Part 8	Issue 1	August 1998	
Part 8	Issue 2	September 1998	
Part 8	Issue 3	October 1998	
Part 8	Issue 4	November 1998	
Part 8	Issue 5	December 1998	
Part 8	Issue 6	January 1999	
Part 8	Issue 7	February 1999	
Part 8	Issue 8	March 1999	
Part 9	Issue 1	April 1999	
Part 9	Issue 2	May 1999	
Part 9	Issue 3	June 1999	
Part 9	Issue 4	July 1999	
Part 9	Issue 5	August 1999	
Part 9	Issue 6	September 1999	
Part 9	Issue 7	October 1999	
Part 9	Issue 8	November 1999	
Part 9	Issue 9	December 1999	
Part 9	Issue 10	January 2000	

==== Tankōbon release ====
Volume no.	First release				Second release		
Volume no.	Title	Chapters	Release	English ISBN	Chapters	Release	English ISBN
1	(None)	1, 2, 7–18	December 1, 1994	978-1-56931-044-1	1–10	October 24, 2003	978-1-59116-054-0
2	Family Affairs	19–23, 25–31	April 8, 1995	978-1-56931-040-3	11–21	December 5, 2003	978-1-59116-099-1
3	Home Sweet Home	32–43	November 5, 1995	978-1-56931-086-1	22–32	February 14, 2004	978-1-59116-127-1
4	Good Housekeeping	44–52	July 8, 1996	978-1-56931-134-9	33–43	April 10, 2004	978-1-59116-248-3
5	Empty Nest	53–61	October 6, 1997	978-1-56931-155-4	44–53	June 12, 2004	978-1-59116-319-0
6	Bedside Manners	62–69, Lost Episode	September 5, 1997	978-1-56931-179-0	54–63, Lost Episode	August 17, 2004	978-1-59116-422-7
7	Intensive Care	70–77	August 8, 1997	978-1-56931-201-8	64–73	November 2, 2004	978-1-59116-485-2
8	Domestic Dispute	78–88	January 28, 1998	978-1-56931-241-4	74–84	December 14, 2004	978-1-59116-562-0
9	Learning Curves	89–99	May 6, 1998	978-1-56931-256-8	85–95	February 8, 2005	978-1-59116-617-7
10	Dogged Pursuit	100–112	May 6, 1998	978-1-56931-285-8	96–106	April 12, 2005	978-1-59116-729-7
11	Student Affairs	113–127	April 8, 1999	978-1-56931-352-7	107–117	June 7, 2005	978-1-59116-804-1
12	The Hounds of War	126–138	October 6, 1999	978-1-56931-398-5	118–129	August 16, 2005	978-1-59116-869-0
13	Game, Set, Match	139–150	October 6, 1999	978-1-56931-435-7	130–140	October 11, 2005	978-1-4215-0141-3
14	Welcome Home	151–161	June 1, 2000	978-1-56931-493-7	141–151	October 11, 2005	978-1-4215-0142-0
15	—N/a				152–161	February 14, 2006	978-1-4215-0279-3

==== Collector's Edition ====
A new English translation was commissioned for the English wideban releases, including revisions to some of the chapter titles, to be more accurate to the original Japanese titles.

No.	English release date	English ISBN
1	September 15, 2020	978-1-9747-1187-1
2	December 15, 2020	978-1-9747-1188-8
3	March 16, 2021	978-1-9747-1189-5
4	June 15, 2021	978-1-9747-1190-1
5	September 21, 2021	978-1-9747-1191-8
6	December 21, 2021	978-1-9747-1192-5
7	March 15, 2022	978-1-9747-1193-2
8	June 28, 2022	978-1-9747-1194-9
9	September 20, 2022	978-1-9747-1195-6
10	December 27, 2022	978-1-9747-1196-3
