= Patti Rope =

Canadian gymnast

Personal information
- Born: 27 December 1959 (age 66) Galt, Ontario, Canada

Sport
- Sport: Gymnastics

Patti Rope (born 27 December 1959) is a Canadian gymnast. She competed in six events at the 1976 Summer Olympics.

== Career ==
During the mid-1970s, Rope would rarely visit home as she pursued her gymnastics vocation under Dick Mubihill, the United States national coach.

During the World Championships held in Bulgaria in 1974, she was one of six youngest competitors. In the 1976 Canadian Gymnastics Championship, she shared the senior women's all-round title with Nancy McDonnell and after injuring her ankle in the vault, had to withdraw from the competition. Following the 1976 Olympics, Rope turned her attention to coaching at her parents' gymnastics club.

== Early life ==
Rope was born as the second child of three girls to her mother Benita Rope and father Donald Rope, who was an Olympic medalist in ice hockey. Her parents were "dedicated to gymnastics" and ran a club named the Cambridge Kips for over 300 children.
