= Werner Steinmetz =

German gymnast

- Born: 12 March 1950 (age 76) Pforzheim, West Germany
- Height: 1.64 m (5 ft 5 in)

Gymnastics career
- Discipline: Men's artistic gymnastics
- Country represented: West Germany
- Gym: Turnverein Pforzheim 1834

Werner Steinmetz (born 12 March 1950) is a German gymnast. He competed in eight events at the 1976 Summer Olympics.
