= Kelly Muncey =

Canadian gymnast

Personal information
- Nationality: Canadian
- Born: 29 November 1959 (age 65); New Westminster, British Columbia, Canada
- Height: 5 ft (1.5 m)

Sport
- Sport: Gymnastics
- Coached by: Fritz Rider; Jim Fountaine

Kelly Muncey (born 29 November 1959) is a Canadian gymnast. She competed in six events at the 1976 Summer Olympics.

== Early life ==
Muncey was born in New Westminster and moved to Lakewood, California at the age of 6. She was sometimes incorrectly listed as being born in Vancouver, where she noted half of her relatives lived, although had lived there for part of her younger life. As a child, Muncey described herself as a tomboy and despite enrolling in a ballet class, "couldn't stand it" and shortly after quit. She then tried an acrobatic class for a day and similarly disliked that, quitting after just one day before joining the YMCA where they had gymnastics classes. She described how she picked up gymnastics quickly having witness another girl "doing all these things", which she then taught to Muncey. One of her earlier coaches, Fritz Rider, recalled talking her out of swimming at the age of 9.

== Career ==
Muncey participated in the YMCA National Gymnastic Championships, held in New Orleans during May 1973, and took some of the top honors, including third place finishes on the uneven bars and floor exercise. As a member of the Long Beach Kips gymnastics team, she was recognized as being an "outstanding participant" during a competition with the Fresno Gym Club in December 1973, in which her team were defeated. During her teens, she was a member of Kips Gym, a privately owned "storefront shop" based in Lakewood, California where she would train for over five hours each day. Officially, her weight was not disclosed but she conceded that she carried more weight than a typical gymnast and that she "should lose weight, like about 10 or 15 pounds". She received support payments from the Canadian government since late 1975, but prior to that needed to raise funds herself, such as participating in a "cartwheel-a-thon" to help with travel costs for her gym.

Muncey was a surprise winner of the women's national overall title at the national women's championships held in Vancouver in March 1975. Before her win, she was relatively unknown and the Ottawa Citizen noted that her "most outstanding characteristic was her anonymity". She was also the first ever gymnast to win both the senior and junior uneven parallel bar titles the year before in the United States and earlier in 1975, won the Milk Meet competition in Toronto. She made her debut in the Canadian gymnastic competition towards the end of March 1975, where she defeated senior champion Nancy McDonnell and went on to win the uneven bars, balance beam and floor exercises. In June, she led a Canadian team to nine medals at an international competition in Bulgaria, individually winning a gold and two silver medals, contrasting to a year before when the Canadian team won a single medal between them. She was noted by The Gazette in Montreal as being "the best Canadian female gymnast Canada never produced", on account of her growing up and training in the United States. Her training costs were somewhere between $50 and $85 each month, paid for by her father. In November 1975, she won the women's division during an international gymnastics meet held at Maple Leaf Gardens, scoring 37.30 in front of a crowd of over 16,000.

Approaching the 1976 Summer Olympics, Muncey was described by the Montreal Star as being "one of the finest young non-Eastern European gymnasts in the world", although conceded that she believed her chances of winning a medal was "none". During an international gymnastics meet in February 1976, she was a top Canadian women, finishing in third place with a score of 77.40. She followed this up in May by winning an individual title at the Concordia Invitation Gymnix meet, despite fatigue before the event.

== Personal ==
Despite being a Canadian and growing up in the United States, she noted in 1976 that she had "no intention" on returning to Canada due to the cold climate.
