= Galina Yaneva =

Bulgarian gymnast (born 1959)

Personal information
- Nationality: Bulgarian
- Born: 13 August 1959 (age 67)

Sport
- Sport: Gymnastics

Galina Yaneva (Bulgarian: Галина Янева) (born 13 August 1959) is a Bulgarian gymnast. She competed in six events at the 1976 Summer Olympics.
