= Vesela Mateeva =

Bulgarian gymnast (born 1960)

Personal information
- Nationality: Bulgarian
- Born: 9 February 1960 (age 66)

Sport
- Sport: Gymnastics

Vesela Mateeva (Bulgarian: Весела Матеева) (born 9 February 1960) is a Bulgarian gymnast. She competed in six events at the 1976 Summer Olympics.
