= Leslie Wolfsberger =

American gymnast

Personal information
- Born: February 5, 1959 (age 66); Avon Park, Florida, United States

Sport
- Sport: Gymnastics

Leslie Wolfsberger (born February 5, 1959) is an American gymnast. She competed in six events at the 1976 Summer Olympics.
