= Nadine Audin =

French gymnast

Personal information
- Nationality: French
- Born: 3 April 1958 (age 68)

Sport
- Sport: Gymnastics

Nadine Audin (born 3 April 1958) is a French gymnast who competed at the 1972 Summer Olympics and the 1976 Summer Olympics.

== Career ==
She was the French Gymnastics Championships in vault and uneven bars in 1973, and in 1974, she won the national finals in the all-around, balance beam, vault, and uneven bars. At the 1977 French Championships, she won the all-around competition and the vault final; at the 1978 French Championships, she won the vault final.

She competed in the gymnastics events at the 1972 Summer Olympics (finishing 15th in the team competition). She was also part of the French delegation competing in the gymnastics events at the 1976 Summer Olympics, alongside her sister Martine Audin.

She retired from her playing career in 1978 and went on to become a coach and then technical director at Indépendante Féminine Montcellienne.
