= Miloslav Netušil =

Czech gymnast (1946–2023)

- Born: 20 February 1946 Chomutov, Czechoslovakia
- Died: 12 July 2023 (aged 77)

Gymnastics career
- Discipline: Men's artistic gymnastics
- Country represented: Czechoslovakia

Miloslav Netušil (20 February 1946 – 12 July 2023) was a Czech gymnast. He competed at the 1968 Summer Olympics, the 1972 Summer Olympics, and the 1976 Summer Olympics.

Netušil died on 12 July 2023, at the age of 77.
