= Chieko Kikkawa =

Japanese gymnast

- Alternative name: Chieko Sano
- Born: 16 March 1955 (age 71) Hiroshima, Japan
- Spouse: Minoru Sano

Gymnastics career
- Discipline: Women's artistic gymnastics
- Country represented: Japan

Chieko Sano, née Kikkawa, (吉川 智恵子, Kikkawa Chieko; born 16 March 1955) is a Japanese former artistic gymnast. She won three national apparatus titles during her career, and she competed at the 1974 World Championships as well as in six events at the 1976 Summer Olympics. She now works in sports media and as a figure skating coach with her husband.

== Career ==
Kikkawa was born 16 March, 1955, in Hiroshima Prefecture.

She won two apparatus titles, on vault and on floor, at the 1974 All-Japan Championships. That year, she was selected to compete at the 1974 World Championships, where she placed 6th in the team event with her teammates. She also competed at Canadian meet, where she placed 6th, behind Nellie Kim and ahead of Kathy Howard.

Two years later, she again won the floor title at the 1976 All-Japan Championships. She was selected for the 1976 Summer Olympics team. There, she and her teammates placed 8th in the team event. Individually, she was 53rd in the qualifying round and did not advance to the all-around final; her best apparatus result was on the vault, where she was 28th.

== Post-competitive career ==
Kikkawa has worked in sports media as a gymnastics commentator. In addition, she has hosted and moderated several annual forums for the organization "Total Olympic Ladies", which highlights female Olympians. She also works as a figure skating coach.

== Personal life ==
Kikkawa is married to former figure skater Minoru Sano, who competed at the Winter Olympics in the same year she competed at the Summer Game. The pair sometimes hosted future Olympic medalist Daisuke Takahashi at their home when he was training with her husband.
