= Mariya Kircheva =

Bulgarian gymnast (born 1957)

Personal information
- Nationality: Bulgarian
- Born: 27 November 1957 (age 68)

Sport
- Sport: Gymnastics

Mariya Kircheva (Bulgarian: Мария Кирчева) (born 27 November 1957) is a Bulgarian gymnast. She competed in six events at the 1976 Summer Olympics.
