= Eva Pořádková =

Czech gymnast

Personal information
- Nationality: Czech
- Born: 16 February 1959 (age 66); Zlín, Czechoslovakia

Sport
- Sport: Gymnastics

Eva Pořádková (born 16 February 1959) is a Czech gymnast. She competed in six events at the 1976 Summer Olympics.
