= Petra Kurbjuweit =

German gymnast

Personal information
- Nationality: German
- Born: 9 November 1956 (age 69) Gelsenkirchen, Germany

Sport
- Sport: Gymnastics

Petra Kurbjuweit (born 9 November 1956) is a German gymnast. She competed in six events at the 1976 Summer Olympics.
