= Stefania Bucci =

Italian gymnast

Personal information
- Nationality: Italian
- Born: 4 June 1960 (age 66) Montevarchi, Italy

Sport
- Sport: Gymnastics

Stefania Bucci (born 4 June 1960) is an Italian gymnast. She competed in six events at the 1976 Summer Olympics.
