= Anna Pohludková =

Czech gymnast

Personal information
- Nationality: Czech
- Born: 26 August 1959 (age 65); Hnojník, Czechoslovakia

Sport
- Country: Czechoslovakia
- Sport: Gymnastics

Anna Pohludková (born 26 August 1959) is a Czech former gymnast. She competed for Czechoslovakia in six events at the 1976 Summer Olympics.
