= Elisa Cabello =

Spanish gymnast

Personal information
- Nationality: Spanish
- Born: 12 October 1956 (age 68); Seville, Spain

Sport
- Sport: Gymnastics

Elisa Cabello (born 12 October 1956) is a Spanish gymnast. She competed in five events at the 1976 Summer Olympics.
