= Drahomíra Smolíková =

Czech gymnast

Personal information
- Nationality: Czech
- Born: 12 January 1959 (age 67) Ostrava, Czechoslovakia

Sport
- Sport: Gymnastics

Drahomíra Smolíková (born 12 January 1959) is a Czech gymnast. She competed in six events at the 1976 Summer Olympics.
