= Nadya Shatarova =

Bulgarian gymnast (born 1960)

Personal information
- Nationality: Bulgarian
- Born: 2 July 1960 (age 66)

Sport
- Sport: Gymnastics
Medal record
Representing Bulgaria
Summer Universiade
| Bronze medal – third place | 1977 Sofia | All-around |
| Bronze medal – third place | 1977 Sofia | Team |

Nadya Shatarova (born 2 July 1960) is a Bulgarian gymnast. She competed in six events at the 1976 Summer Olympics.
