= Beate Renschler =

German gymnast

Personal information
- Nationality: German
- Born: 2 September 1958 (age 66); Rastatt, West Germany

Sport
- Sport: Gymnastics

Beate Renschler (born 2 September 1958) is a German gymnast. She competed in six events at the 1976 Summer Olympics representing West Germany.
