= Joke Kos =

Dutch gymnast

Personal information
- Nationality: Dutch
- Born: 16 February 1956 (age 69); Heemskerk, Netherlands

Sport
- Sport: Gymnastics

Joke Kos (born 16 February 1956) is a Dutch gymnast. She competed in six events at the 1976 Summer Olympics.
