= Traudl Schubert =

German gymnast

Personal information
- Nationality: German
- Born: 25 September 1957 (age 68) Penzberg, Germany

Sport
- Sport: Gymnastics

Traudl Schubert (born 25 September 1957) is a German gymnast. She competed in six events at the 1976 Summer Olympics.
