= Nobue Yamazaki =

Japanese gymnast

Personal information
- Nationality: Japanese
- Born: 4 September 1950 (age 76)

Sport
- Sport: Gymnastics

Nobue Yamazaki (山崎 信恵, Yamazaki Nobue; born 4 September 1950) is a Japanese gymnast. She competed in six events at the 1976 Summer Olympics.
