= Mercedes Vernetta =

Spanish gymnast

Personal information
- Nationality: Spanish
- Born: 30 March 1957 (age 69) Las Palmas, Spain

Sport
- Sport: Gymnastics

Mercedes Vernetta (born 30 March 1957) is a Spanish gymnast. She competed in five events at the 1976 Summer Olympics.
