= Carla Wieser =

Italian gymnast

Personal information
- Nationality: Italian
- Born: 11 March 1961 (age 65)

Sport
- Sport: Gymnastics

Carla Wieser (born 11 March 1961) is an Italian gymnast. She competed in six events at the 1976 Summer Olympics.
