= Monique Freres =

Belgian gymnast (1957–2026)

Personal information
- Nationality: Belgian
- Born: 30 March 1957 Seraing, Belgium
- Died: 17 January 2026 (aged 68)

Sport
- Sport: Gymnastics

Monique Freres (30 March 1957 – 17 January 2026) was a Belgian gymnast. She competed in five events at the 1976 Summer Olympics. Freres died on 17 January 2026, at the age of 68.
