= Jana Knopová =

Czech gymnast

Personal information
- Nationality: Czech
- Born: 2 December 1957 (age 68) Ostrava, Czechoslovakia

Sport
- Sport: Gymnastics

Jana Knopová (born 2 December 1957) is a Czech gymnast. She competed in six events at the 1976 Summer Olympics.
