= Mária Lővey =

Hungarian gymnast

Personal information
- Nationality: Hungarian
- Born: 15 June 1960 (age 66) Dunaújváros, Hungary

Sport
- Sport: Gymnastics

Mária Lővey (born 15 June 1960) is a Hungarian gymnast. She competed in six events at the 1976 Summer Olympics.
