= Carla Braan =

Dutch gymnast

Personal information
- Nationality: Dutch
- Born: 23 July 1961; Volendam, Netherlands
- Died: 23 April 2016 (aged 54); Christchurch, New Zealand

Sport
- Sport: Gymnastics

Carla Braan (23 July 1961 – 23 April 2016) was a Dutch gymnast. She competed in six events at the 1976 Summer Olympics.
