= Svetla Kashtelyan =

Bulgarian gymnast (born 1958)

Personal information
- Nationality: Bulgarian
- Born: 13 August 1958 (age 68)

Sport
- Sport: Gymnastics

Svetla Kashtelyan (born 13 August 1958) is a Bulgarian gymnast. She competed in six events at the 1976 Summer Olympics.
