= Nina Kostova =

Bulgarian gymnast (born 1959)

Personal information
- Nationality: Bulgarian
- Born: 11 September 1959 (age 67)

Sport
- Sport: Gymnastics

Nina Kostova (Bulgarian: Нина Костова) (born 11 September 1959) is a Bulgarian gymnast. She competed in six events at the 1976 Summer Olympics.
