= Eloisa Marcos =

Spanish gymnast

Personal information
- Nationality: Spanish
- Born: 15 January 1962 (age 63); Mieres, Spain

Sport
- Sport: Gymnastics

Eloisa Marcos (born 15 January 1962) is a Spanish gymnast. She competed in five events at the 1976 Summer Olympics.
