= Valentina Spongia =

Italian gymnast

Personal information
- Nationality: Italian
- Born: 12 October 1958 (age 68) Trieste, Italy

Sport
- Sport: Gymnastics

Valentina Spongia (born 12 October 1958) is an Italian gymnast. She competed in six events at the 1976 Summer Olympics.
