= Wanita Lynch =

Australian gymnast

Personal information
- Nationality: Australian
- Born: 16 November 1958 (age 66)

Sport
- Sport: Gymnastics

Wanita Lynch (born 16 November 1958) is an Australian gymnast. She competed in five events at the 1976 Summer Olympics.
