= Andrea Bieger =

German gymnast

Personal information
- Nationality: German
- Born: 8 October 1959 (age 65); Kiel, Germany

Sport
- Sport: Gymnastics

Andrea Bieger (born 8 October 1959) is a German former gymnast. She competed in two events, team and individual all around, at the 1976 Summer Olympics.
