= Joëlle De Keukeleire =

Belgian gymnast (born 1959)

Personal information
- Nationality: Belgian
- Born: 27 September 1959 (age 65); Uccle, Belgium

Sport
- Sport: Gymnastics

Joëlle De Keukeleire (born 27 September 1959) is a Belgian gymnast. She competed in five events at the 1976 Summer Olympics.
