= Monique Bolleboom =

Dutch artistic gymnast

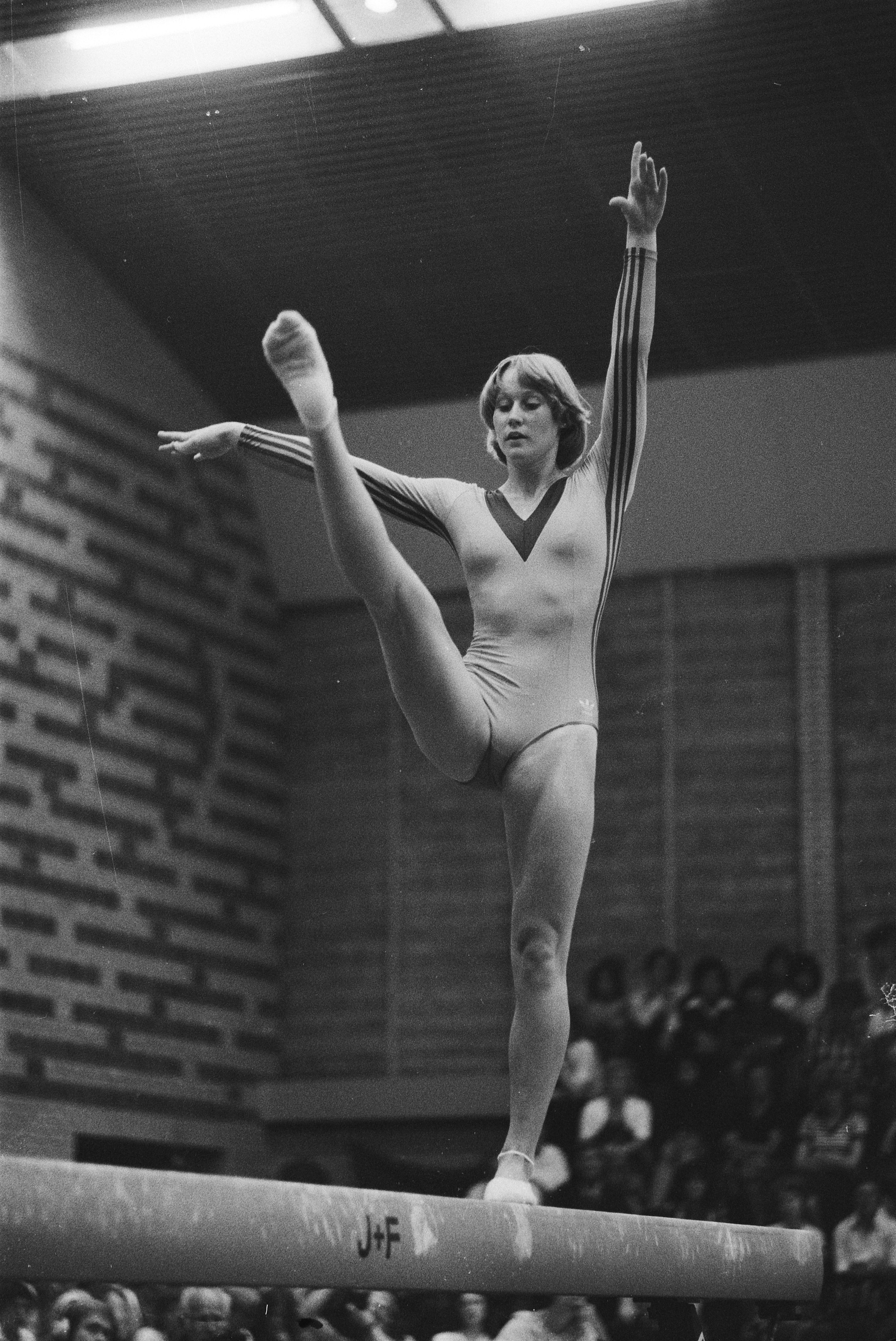
- Monique Bolleboom in 1978

Personal information
- Born: 11 August 1962 (age 64) Zoetermeer, Netherlands
- Height: 1.62 m (5 ft 4 in)
- Weight: 48 kg (106 lb)

Sport
- Sport: Artistic gymnastics

Monica Johanna Petronella "Monique" Bolleboom (born 11 August 1962) is a former artistic gymnast from the Netherlands. She competed at the 1976 Summer Olympics in all artistic gymnastics events with the best achievement of 11th place in the team all-around.

Her sister Ingrid is also a former artistic gymnast.
