= Martine Audin =

French gymnast

Personal information
- Nationality: French
- Born: 13 June 1959 (age 65)

Sport
- Sport: Gymnastics

Martine Audin (born 13 June 1959) is a French gymnast. She competed in five events at the 1976 Summer Olympics.
