= Carola Dombeck =

German gymnast

Olympic medal record

Women's gymnastics

Representing East Germany
| Silver medal – second place | 1976 Montreal | Vault |
| Bronze medal – third place | 1976 Montreal | Team |

Carola Dombeck (born 25 June 1960 in Merseburg, Bezirk Halle) is a German former gymnast who competed in the 1976 Summer Olympics.
