= Margit Tóth =

Hungarian artistic gymnast

Margit Tóth (27 October 1961 – 18 December 2016) was a Hungarian artistic gymnast. She competed at the 1976 Summer Olympics. Born in Dunaújváros in 1961, Tóth died in 2016 at the age of 55.
