= Georgeta Gabor =

Romanian artistic gymnast

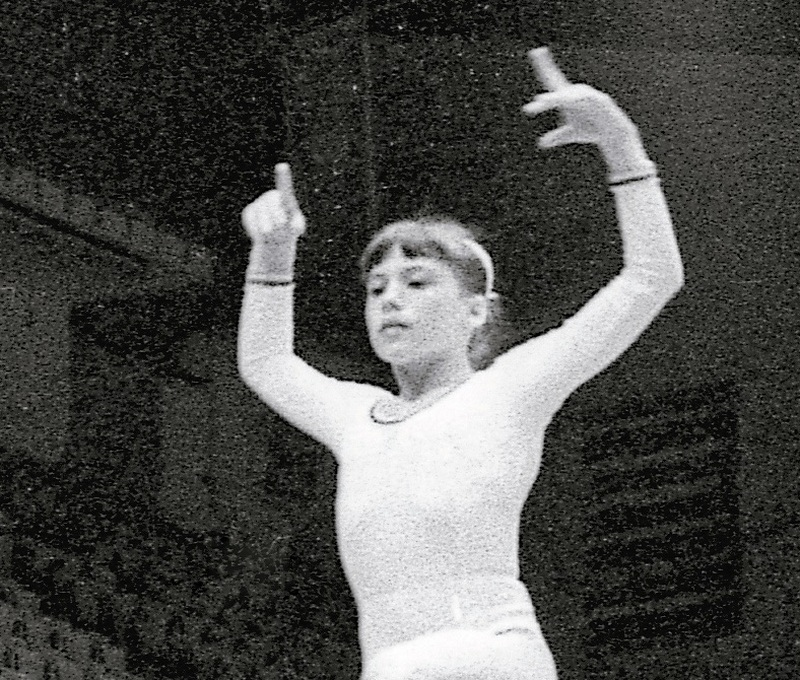

Personal information
- Born: 10 January 1962 (age 64) Onești, Romania
- Height: 142 cm (4 ft 8 in)

Gymnastics career
- Discipline: Women's artistic gymnastics
- Country represented: Romania
- Head coach: Béla Károlyi
- Assistant coach: Marta Károlyi
- Choreographer: Geza Pozar
Medal record
Summer Olympics
Silver medal – second place	1976 Montreal	Team competition

Georgeta Gabor (born 10 January 1962, Onesti, Bacau county) is a retired Romanian artistic gymnast who won a team silver medal at the 1976 Olympics. Her son, Andrei Antohi is a footballer.
