= Svetlana Grozdova =

- Born: 29 January 1959 (age 67) Rostov on Don, Russian SFSR, Soviet Union

Gymnastics career
- Discipline: Women's artistic gymnastics
- Country represented: Soviet Union
Medal record
Olympic Games
Gold medal – first place	1976 Montreal	Team competition

Svetlana Khristoforovna Grozdova (Russian: Светлана Христофоровна Гроздова, born 29 January 1959 in Rostov on Don) is a retired Soviet Russian gymnast.

She started training in gymnastics at age 8 and was coached by Russian gymnastics coach Ruslan Lavrov in a gym in Rostov-on-Don. She was a member of the Soviet Union's 1976 Olympics Gold medal-winning gymnastics team alongside Maria Filatova, Nellie Kim, Elvira Saadi, Ludmilla Tourischeva and Olga Korbut.

In 1974 and 1976, she was the Moscow News All Around champion. She was awarded the Order of the Badge of Honor in 1976. In 1980 she left the world of competitive gymnastics and took up sports acrobatics and was competing in it by the mid-1980s.

Her best event was the balance beam. Despite not winning any Olympic medals in this event, she was a pro at wowing the crowds at USSR gymnastics exhibitions around the world with her tremendous flexibility and mesmerising balance on her hands. She had an unusually flexible, rubber-like spine which allowed her to perform walkovers along the 4 in (10 cm) width of the balance beam, and to do a split handstand at the very end of the beam and touching the beam with her foot behind her head.

== Competition History ==
Year	Event	Team	AA	VT	UB	BB	FX
1973	GDR-USSR Dual Meet		3rd place, bronze medalist(s)		3rd place, bronze medalist(s)		2nd place, silver medalist(s)
1973	Druzhba	1st place, gold medalist(s)	4	7	3rd place, bronze medalist(s)	1st place, gold medalist(s)	
1973	Riga International		3rd place, bronze medalist(s)		3rd place, bronze medalist(s)	6	2nd place, silver medalist(s)
1973	USSR-GDR-CSSR-HUN Meet	1st place, gold medalist(s)	3rd place, bronze medalist(s)				
1974	Moscow News		1st place, gold medalist(s)	2nd place, silver medalist(s)		2nd place, silver medalist(s)	2nd place, silver medalist(s)
1974	Antibes International		1st place, gold medalist(s)				
1974	Golden Sands International		1st place, gold medalist(s)				
1974	USSR Championships	4	4				
1974	USSR Cup		5			1st place, gold medalist(s)	3rd place, bronze medalist(s)
1976	Moscow News		1st place, gold medalist(s)		1st place, gold medalist(s)	3rd place, bronze medalist(s)	
1976	Chunichi Cup		5				
1976	Tokyo Cup				1st place, gold medalist(s)		1st place, gold medalist(s)
1976	USSR Championships	4	1st place, gold medalist(s)			1st place, gold medalist(s)	
1976	USSR Cup		9			2nd place, silver medalist(s)	3rd place, bronze medalist(s)
1976	USSR-CSSR Dual Meet	1st place, gold medalist(s)				1st place, gold medalist(s)	1st place, gold medalist(s)
1976	Olympic Games	1st place, gold medalist(s)					
1977	Army Club Championships		1st place, gold medalist(s)				
1978	FRA-USSR-BUL Meet	1st place, gold medalist(s)	1st place, gold medalist(s)				
1978	USSR Championships	1st place, gold medalist(s)	18			7	7
1978	USSR Cup		12				
1979	Istanbul International		1st place, gold medalist(s)				
1979	University Games	1st place, gold medalist(s)	4			2nd place, silver medalist(s)	
