= Jeannette van Ravenstijn =

Dutch gymnast (born 1958)

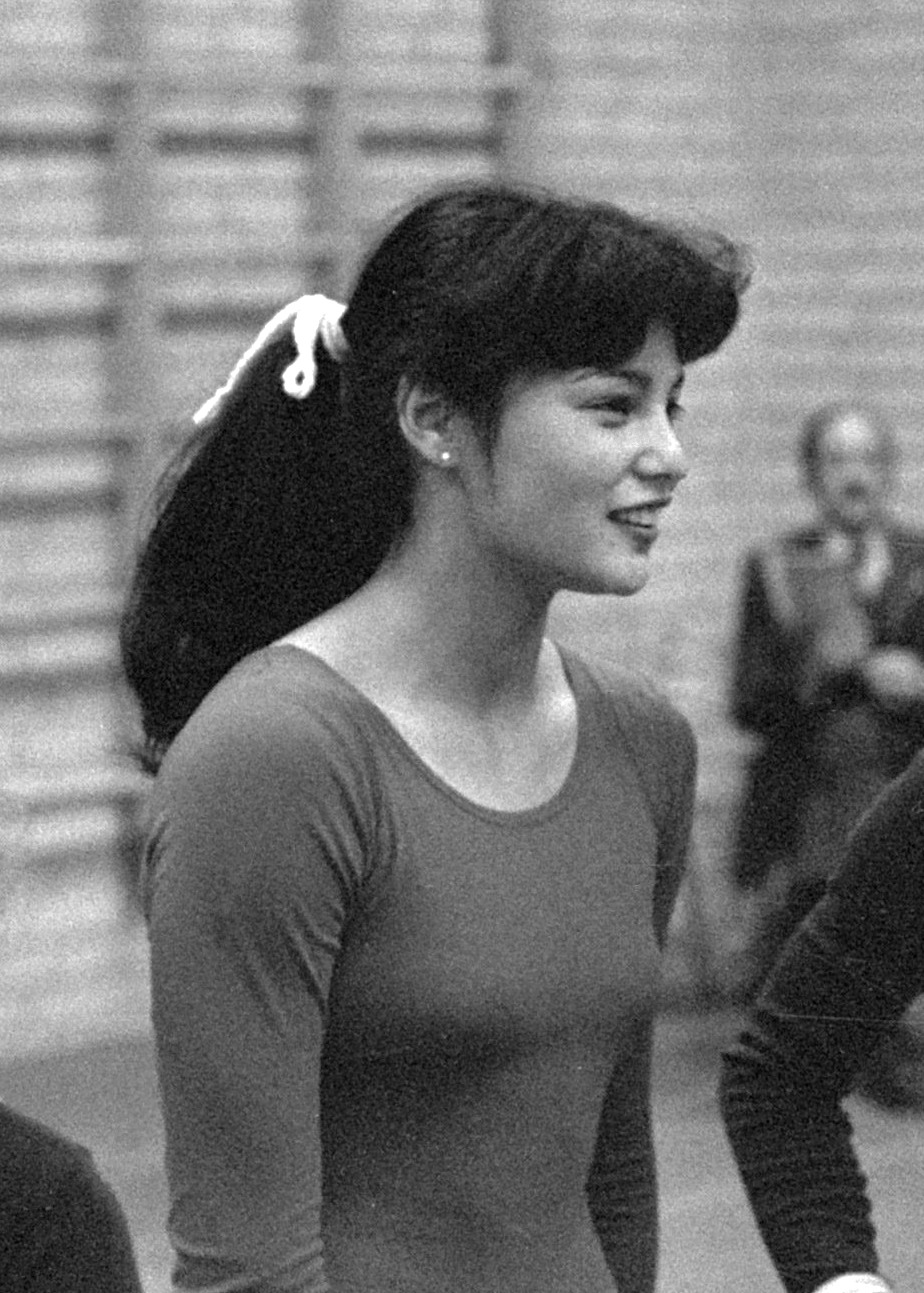
- Jeannette van Ravenstijn in 1976

Personal information
- Born: 28 July 1958 (age 67) Eindhoven, the Netherlands
- Height: 1.69 m (5 ft 7 in)
- Weight: 58 kg (128 lb)

Sport
- Sport: Artistic gymnastics
- Club: PSV, Eindhoven

Jeannette Cornelia van Ravenstijn (born 28 July 1958) is a retired Dutch gymnast. She competed at the 1976 Summer Olympics in all artistic gymnastics events and finished in 11th place with the Dutch team. Her best individual result was 25th place all-around. She was chosen as the most beautiful competitor of the 1976 Games.

She retired from competitions the same year and worked as a model and the television presenter of her program "Body talk" in Amsterdam. The program was devoted to improving the body shape, beauty and fitness.
