= Kyoko Mano =

Japanese gymnast

Personal information
- Nationality: Japanese
- Born: 5 October 1956 (age 70)

Sport
- Sport: Gymnastics

Kyoko Mano (真野 郷子, Mano Kyōko; born 5 October 1956) is a Japanese gymnast. She competed in six events at the 1976 Summer Olympics.
