= Carrie Englert =

American artistic gymnast

Carrie Englert or Carrie Englert Zimmerman (born November 28, 1957) was the United States gymnastics champion in floor exercise and balance beam in 1976, and a competitor in the 1976 Olympic Games in women's gymnastics.
