= Marion Kische =

German artistic gymnast

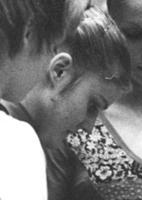
- Marion Kische (1976)

Medal record

Women's gymnastics

Representing East Germany
Bronze medal – third place	1976 Montreal	Team

Marion Kische (later Wellner, born 30 March 1958 in Dresden) is a German former gymnast who competed in the 1976 Summer Olympics.
