= Chantal Seggiaro =

French gymnast

Personal information
- Nationality: French
- Born: 4 April 1956 (age 70)

Sport
- Sport: Gymnastics

Chantal Seggiaro (born 4 April 1956) is a French gymnast. She competed in five events at the 1976 Summer Olympics.
