= Donatella Sacchi =

Italian gymnast

Donatella Sacchi OMRI
Personal information
- Nationality: Italian
- Born: 16 July 1959 (age 67) Novara, Italy
- Height: 164 cm (5 ft 5 in)

Sport
- Sport: Artistic Gymnastics

Donatella Sacchi (born 16 July 1959) is an Italian former gymnast. She competed at the 1976 Summer Olympics. At the 2020 Summer Olympics, she served as the president of the superior jury evaluating women's artistic gymnastics.

== Personal life ==
Donatella Sacchi was born in 1959 to her parents Mariuccia and Davide, who were the founders and owners of Libertas Ginnastica, a gymnastics gym in Novara. She has a brother named Andrea who was also a gymnast. He is the coach of Italian gymnast Enrico Pozzo.

Her husband, Massimo Contaldo, owns the Quisquash gym in Novara and is the team manager of Italy's women's gymnastics team.

Sacchi speaks Italian, English, Russian, German, and French.

== Athletic career ==
At the junior level, Sacchi won gold in the all-around at the Italian championships in 1973.

As a gymnast competing at the senior level, Sacchi placed 9th in the all-around at the Italian Championships in 1975. In the same year, she also won a gold medal at the 1975 Mediterranean Games in the team event. She placed 13th in the all-around.

At the 1976 Montreal Olympics, she placed 71st in the individual all-around and did not qualify for finals. In the team event, Italy scored 365.100 points, putting them last, in 12th place behind the Netherlands.

== Career in gymnastics ==
=== Italian national team ===
After retiring from competing in 1976, she became the national coach for the junior and senior Italian teams for women's artistic gymnastics in 1977. She continued to be the coach until 1984. In January 2005, she was put in charge of the Italian national teams.

=== Judging and work at the FIG ===
Sacchi began judging women's artistic gymnastics internationally in 1993. In 2004, she was selected to judge women's artistic gymnastics at the 2004 Olympic Games in Athens, Greece. Following the Olympics, she joined the International Gymnastics Federation (FIG) as a member of the Women's Artistic Gymnastics Technical Committee. In 2016, she was elected uncontested as president of the technical committee, where she has been appointed since.

In 2021, Sacchi began chairing the new Safeguarding Working Group within the FIG, a working group aiming to promote gymnast welfare in the sport.

During the floor exercise bronze medal controversy at the 2024 Paris Olympics, the implicated gymnasts representing Romania, Ana Bărbosu and Sabrina Voinea, along with the Romanian Gymnastics Federation launched a dispute against Sacchi and the FIG at the Court of Arbitration for Sport (CAS). The dispute resulted in a reallocation of the bronze medal from Jordan Chiles to Bărbosu. In the ruling, Sacchi was found to have acted reasonably in accepting Chiles' inquiry and that the responsibility for the error was to be placed on the FIG, and not Sacchi.

== Competitive history ==
Year	Event	Team	AA	VT	UB	BB	FX
Senior
1975	Italian Championships		9				
1975	Mediterranean Games	1st place, gold medalist(s)	13				
1976	Olympic Games	12	71	66	78	63	52

== Awards ==
In 2006, she was awarded the "Novara Citizen of the Year" award.

On 18 May 2021, she was awarded the title of "Knight of the Order of Merit of the Italian Republic"
