= Mariana Constantin =

Romanian gymnast (born 1960)

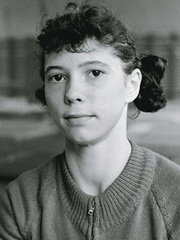

Personal information
- Born: 3 August 1960 (age 66) Ploieşti, Romania
- Height: 160 cm (5 ft 3 in)

Gymnastics career
- Discipline: Women's artistic gymnastics
- Country represented: Romania
- Club: Petrolul Ploieşti
- Head coach: Leana Sima
- Assistant coach: Béla Károlyi Marta Károlyi
- Choreographer: Geza Pozar
Medal record
1976 Summer Olympics
Silver medal – second place	1976 Montreal	Team competition

Mariana Constantin (born 3 August 1960) is a retired Romanian artistic gymnast. She won a team silver medal at the 1976 Olympics.
