= Gabriela Trușcă =

Romanian artistic gymnast

Gabriela Truşcă
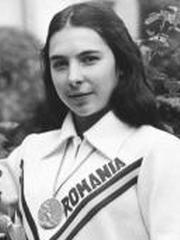

Personal information
- Born: 15 August 1957 (age 69) Bacău, Romania
- Height: 157 cm (5 ft 2 in)

Gymnastics career
- Discipline: Women's artistic gymnastics
- Country represented: Romania
- Club: CSS Bacău
- Head coach: Béla Károlyi
- Assistant coach: Marta Károlyi
- Choreographer: Geza Pozar
Medal record
Summer Olympics
Silver medal – second place	1976 Montreal	Team competition

Gabriela Truşcă (later Robu, born 15 August 1957) is a retired Romanian artistic gymnast who won a team silver medal at the 1976 Olympics. After retiring from competitions, she became a coach at CSS Buzău, where she raised several generations of young gymnasts, including Gabriela Drăgoi.
