= Patrizia Fratini =

Italian gymnast

Personal information
- Nationality: Italian
- Born: 27 July 1961 (age 63); Prato, Italy

Sport
- Sport: Gymnastics

Patrizia Fratini (born 27 July 1961) is an Italian gymnast. She competed in six events at the 1976 Summer Olympics.
