= Gitta Escher =

German gymnast

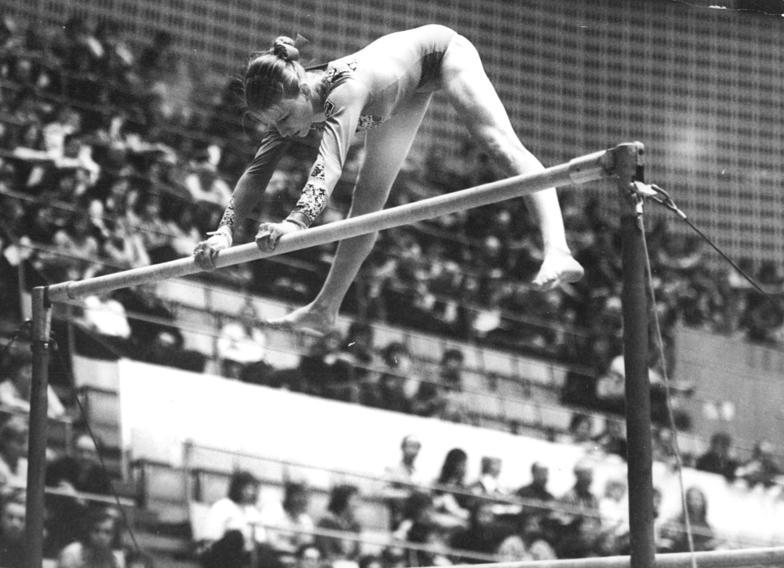
- Escher in 1976

Personal information
- Born: 18 March 1957 (age 69) Nordhausen, East Germany
- Height: 1.63 m (5 ft 4 in)
- Weight: 48 kg (106 lb)

Sport
- Sport: Artistic gymnastics
- Club: SV Halle
Medal record
Representing East Germany
Olympic Games
Bronze medal – third place	1976 Montreal	Team

Gitta Escher (later Sommer then Wagenknecht, born 18 March 1957) is a German former gymnast. She competed at the 1976 Summer Olympics in all artistic gymnastics events and won a bronze medal in the team competition. Individually she finished fifth in the vault and sixth in the floor exercise, balance beam and all-around.

After retirement from competition she worked as a gymnastics coach at her club SV Halle.
