= Nancy McDonnell =

Canadian gymnast

Personal information
- Born: 26 March 1955 (age 70) Toronto, Ontario, Canada

Sport
- Sport: Gymnastics

Nancy McDonnell (born 26 March 1955) is a Canadian gymnast. She competed at the 1972 Summer Olympics and the 1976 Summer Olympics.
