= Gymnastics at the 1976 Summer Olympics =

Gymnastics at the Games of the XXI Olympiad
- Venue: Montreal Forum
- Dates: 18 July – 23 July 1976

At the 1976 Summer Olympics, fourteen different artistic gymnastics events were contested, eight for men and six for women. All events were held at the Montreal Forum in Montreal from July 18 through 23.

For the first time in Olympic competition, countries were limited to having three gymnasts in the all-around competition and two gymnasts in each apparatus final. This was a controversial decision, which prevented many gymnasts of strong teams from competing in the finals. In addition, for the first time the number of countries allowed to bring full teams of six gymnasts and compete in the team competition was limited to twelve.

== Qualification ==
The results of the team competition at the previous world championships determined which countries were allowed to bring teams; the top six countries in the team competition qualified for the Olympics.

The intended qualification system for the next six teams was to have a series of dual-country meets. Due to logistical travel concerns, countries were allowed to choose who they competed against, and a scoring threshold was set to decide qualifications, with the top six teams above the threshold qualifying for the Olympics. However, this system created incentives for pairs of countries to hold competitions where they mutually agreed to give the gymnasts from both countries extremely high scores. In March 1976, the official newsletter of the U.S. Gymnastics Federation stated that "The qualification scores from almost all parts of the gymnastic world are so high as to be unbelievable." These inflated scores increased the qualification chances for lower-ranked teams and increased the prestige of gymnasts in already qualified programs, such as Nadia Comăneci from Romania, who reportedly competed in 14 meets in just a few weeks.

The International Gymnastics Federation, on realizing the problems with the scores, changed the qualification process. Scores from the dual meets only counted for 60% of the qualification rankings, and the remaining 40% came from another qualification event held in Hamburg. Frank Bare from the U.S. Gymnastics Federation complained that they had already gone to considerable expense to qualify a team by following the rules of the original system, only to learn that they would have to spend even more. The qualification event was held in early May, and none of the judges at the event were from countries attempting to qualify a team or individual.

== Format of competition ==
The gymnastics competition at the 1976 Summer Olympics was carried out in three stages:

- Competition I - The team competition/qualification round in which all gymnasts, including those who were not part of a team, performed both compulsory and optional exercises. The combined scores of all team members determined the final score of the team. The thirty-six overall highest scoring gymnasts qualified to the individual all-around competition. The six highest scoring gymnasts on each apparatus qualified to the final for that apparatus.
- Competition II - The individual all-around competition, in which those who qualified from Competition I performed exercises on each apparatus. The final score of each gymnast was composed of half the points earned by that gymnast during Competition I and all of the points earned by him or her in Competition II.
- Competition III - The apparatus finals, in which those who qualified during Competition I performed an exercise on the individual apparatus on which he or she had qualified. The final score of each gymnast was composed of half the points earned by that gymnast on that particular apparatus during Competition I and all of the points earned by him or her on that particular apparatus in Competition III.

Each country was limited to three gymnasts in the all-around final and two gymnasts in each apparatus final.

== Medal summary ==
=== Men's events ===
Games	Gold	Silver	Bronze
Individual all-around	Nikolai Andrianov; Soviet Union	Sawao Kato; Japan	Mitsuo Tsukahara; Japan
Team all-around	Japan; Shun Fujimoto; Hisato Igarashi; Hiroshi Kajiyama; Sawao Kato; Eizo Kenmotsu; Mitsuo Tsukahara	Soviet Union; Nikolai Andrianov; Alexander Dityatin; Gennady Krysin; Vladimir Marchenko; Vladimir Markelov; Vladimir Tikhonov	East Germany; Roland Brückner; Rainer Hanschke; Bernd Jäger; Wolfgang Klotz; Lutz Mack; Michael Nikolay
Floor exercise	Nikolai Andrianov; Soviet Union	Vladimir Marchenko; Soviet Union	Peter Kormann; United States
Horizontal bar	Mitsuo Tsukahara; Japan	Eizo Kenmotsu; Japan	Eberhard Gienger; West Germany
Horizontal bar	Mitsuo Tsukahara; Japan	Eizo Kenmotsu; Japan	Henri Boerio; France
Parallel bars	Sawao Kato; Japan	Nikolai Andrianov; Soviet Union	Mitsuo Tsukahara; Japan
Pommel horse	Zoltán Magyar; Hungary	Eizo Kenmotsu; Japan	Nikolai Andrianov; Soviet Union
Pommel horse	Zoltán Magyar; Hungary	Eizo Kenmotsu; Japan	Michael Nikolay; East Germany
Rings	Nikolai Andrianov; Soviet Union	Alexander Dityatin; Soviet Union	Danuţ Grecu; Romania
Vault	Nikolai Andrianov; Soviet Union	Mitsuo Tsukahara; Japan	Hiroshi Kajiyama; Japan

=== Women's events ===
Games	Gold	Silver	Bronze
Individual all-around	Nadia Comăneci; Romania	Nellie Kim; Soviet Union	Ludmila Tourischeva; Soviet Union
Team all-around	Soviet Union; Maria Filatova; Svetlana Grozdova; Nellie Kim; Olga Korbut; Elvira Saadi; Ludmila Tourischeva	Romania; Nadia Comăneci; Mariana Constantin; Georgeta Gabor; Anca Grigoraș; Gabriela Trușcă; Teodora Ungureanu	East Germany; Carola Dombeck; Gitta Escher; Kerstin Gerschau; Angelika Hellmann; Marion Kische; Steffi Kräker
Balance beam	Nadia Comăneci; Romania	Olga Korbut; Soviet Union	Teodora Ungureanu; Romania
Floor exercise	Nellie Kim; Soviet Union	Ludmila Tourischeva; Soviet Union	Nadia Comăneci; Romania
Uneven bars	Nadia Comăneci; Romania	Teodora Ungureanu; Romania	Márta Egervári; Hungary
Vault	Nellie Kim; Soviet Union	Ludmila Tourischeva; Soviet Union; Carola Dombeck; East Germany	None awarded

== Medal table ==
Rank	Nation	Gold	Silver	Bronze	Total
1	Soviet Union	7	8	2	17
2	Japan	3	4	3	10
3	Romania	3	2	3	8
4	Hungary	1	0	1	2
5	East Germany	0	1	3	4
6	France	0	0	1	1
6	United States	0	0	1	1
6	West Germany	0	0	1	1
Totals (8 entries)		14	15	15	44

== See also ==
- Olympic medalists in gymnastics (men)
- Olympic medalists in gymnastics (women)
- 1974 World Artistic Gymnastics Championships
