= Agnes (name) =

Female given name

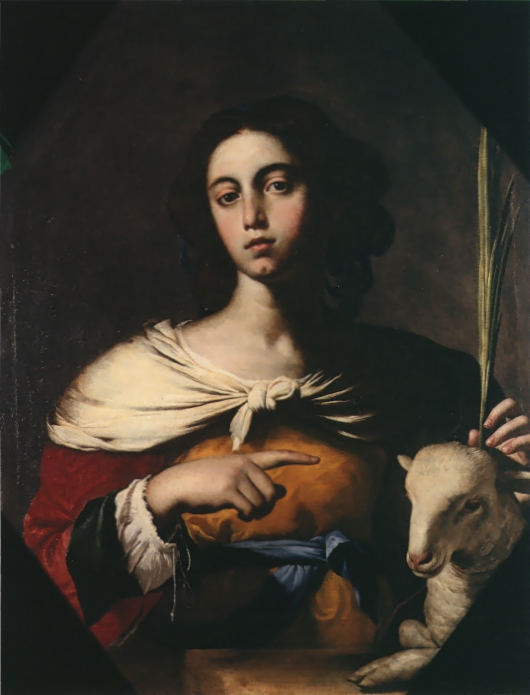
- The name Agnes was widely used to honour Saint Agnes of Rome
- Gender: Feminine
- Language: English, Greek, Germanic

Origin
- Meaning: "pure, holy"

Agnes is a feminine given name derived from the Greek Ἁγνή Hagnḗ, meaning 'pure' or 'holy'. This was Latinised Hagnes, and passed to Italian as Agnese, to French as Agnès, to Agnes in English and other Germanic languages, to Portuguese as Inês, and to Spanish as Inés.

Inès and Inez are modern French and English (international) derivatives of the Iberian variant.

The name descends from the Proto-Indo-European *h₁yaǵ-, meaning 'to sacrifice; to worship', from which also the Vedic term yajña originates. The Sanskrit Agni (अग्नि, ’fire’) can perhaps also be seen as related. The name is mostly used in Greece and in countries that speak Germanic languages.

It was the name of a popular Christian saint, Agnes of Rome, a fact which encouraged its wide use. "Agnes" was the third-most popular name for women in the English-speaking world for more than 400 years. The traditional Welsh variant or diminutive is Nesta. Its medieval English pronunciation was Annis, and this and many other of its forms coincided with the equally popular name "Anna" (incl. Anne and Ann) which has a different origin, derived from the Hebrew 'Hannah" ('God favoured me') rather than from the Greek.

In Europe, the peak of Agnes' popularity came between 1900 and 1920. Agnieszka was the sixth-most popular name for girls born in Poland in 2007, having risen as high as third place in Sweden and Poland in 2006. It also ranked among the top one hundred names for baby girls born in Hungary in 2005. Neža, a Slovene shortened variant of the name, ranked among the top ten names for baby girls born in Slovenia in 2008. The French forms Inès and Ines both ranked among the top ten names for girls born in Brussels, Belgium in 2008. Agnes remained a widely used name throughout the 1960s in the United States, and last ranked among the top 1,000 names for American baby girls during that decade.

== Name variants ==
- Albanian: Agnesa, Anjeza
- Arabic: Inās, Anissa
- Breton: Oanez
- Bulgarian: Огняна (Ognyana)
- Catalan: Agneta, Agnès
- Croatian: Agneza, Ines, Janja
- Czech: Anežka
- Danish: Agnete, Agnethe, Agneta, Agnes
- Dutch: Inez, Nieske, Agnes
- English: Agnes, Anessa, Annice, Anissa, Inez
- Estonian: Agnes, Aune
- Fijian: Akanisi
- Finnish: Agneeta, Akneeta, Akneetta, Aknes, Aknietta, Aune, Iines
- French: Agnès, Ines, Inez
- German: Agnes, Agneta, Ines
- Greek: Αγνή (Agni)
- Hungarian: Ágnes
- Icelandic: Agnes, Agneta
- Indonesian: Agnez
- Irish: Aignéis
- Italian: Agnese, Ines
- Latvian: Agnese, Inese
- Lithuanian: Agnesė, Agneta, Inesa
- Macedonian: Агнеса (Agnesa), Агнија (Agnija)
- Māori: Akenehi
- Norwegian: Agnes, Agneta, Agnete, Agnethe
- Polish: Agnieszka, Jagna, Jagienka, Inka
- Portuguese: Ines, Inez
- Romanian: Agneza
- Russian: Agnessa (Агнесса), Agniya, Inessa (Инесса)
- Scottish Gaelic: Aigneas
- Serbian: Агнија (Agnija), Инес (Ines)
- Slovenian: Ines, Janja, Neža
- Spanish: Ines, Inez
- Swedish: Agnes, Agneta, Agnetha, Inez
- Tongan: Akanete
- Ukrainian: Агнія (Ahniya), Агнета (Ahneta), Агнеса (Ahnesa),
- Valencian: Agnés
- Vietnamese: Anê
- Welsh: Nesta, Annest

== Notable people ==
=== Saints ===
- Agnes of Assisi (1197/98–1253), one of the first abbesses of the Order of Poor Ladies
- Agnes of Bohemia (1211–1282), Bohemian princess (also listed in next section)
- Agnes of Montepulciano (1263–1317), Dominican prioress
- Agnes of Rome (c. 291–c. 304), virgin martyr
- Agnes Tsao Kou Ying (1821–1856), Chinese martyr
- Anjezë Gonxhe Bojaxhiu (1910–1997), Albanian missionary

=== Noblewomen ===
- Agnes I, Abbess of Quedlinburg (c. 1090–1125), Princess-Abbess of Quedlinburg
- Agnes of Aquitaine (disambiguation)
- Agnes of Antioch, (1154–c. 1184), Queen consort of Hungary
- Agnes of Austria (disambiguation)
- Agnes of Babenberg (c. 1108/13–1163), High Duchess of Poland and Duchess of Silesia
- Agnes of Bohemia (1211–1282), Bohemian princess and saint (see above)
- Agnes of Brandenburg (c. 1257–1304), Queen consort and regent of Denmark
- Agnes of Burgundy, Duchess of Aquitaine (died 1068)
- Agnes of Burgundy, Duchess of Bourbon (1407–1476)
- Agnes of Courtenay (c. 1136–c. 1184), Queen consort of Jerusalem
- Agnes of France, Byzantine Empress (1171–after 1207)
- Agnes of France, Duchess of Burgundy (c. 1260–1327)
- Agnes of Germany (1072–1143), Duchess consort of Swabia by her first marriage, Margravine consort of Austria by her second
- Agnes of Habsburg (c. 1257–1322), Duchess of Saxony
- Agnes Hammarskjöld (1866–1940), wife of Swedish noble Hjalmar Hammarskjöld
- Princess Agnes of Hohenlohe-Langenburg (1804–1833)
- Agnes of Hohenstaufen (1176–1204), Countess Palatine of the Rhine
- Agnes Hotot (14th century), English noblewoman known for winning a lance fight
- Agnes of Merania (died 1201), Queen of France
- Agnes of the Palatinate (1201–1267), Duchess of Bavaria
- Agnes of Poitou (1025–1077), Holy Roman Empress and regent
- Agnes of Rochlitz (died 1195), Duchess of Merania and Countess of Andechs
- Agnes of Wrocław (1230/1236-1277), Silesian princess from the Piast dynasty
- Agnès Sorel (died 1450), mistress of Charles VII of France, and the first officially recognized mistress of a French king
- Agnes, daughter of Ottokar II (before 1260–after 1279), Bohemian noblewoman
- Mihrişah Valide Sultan or Sultana Mehr-î-Shah (ca. 1745–1805), spouse of Ottoman Sultan Mustafa III, mother of Caliph Sultan Selim III, believed to have the given name Agnès
- Agnes Howard, Duchess of Norfolk (c. 1477–1545)
- Agnes Macdonald, 1st Baroness Macdonald of Earnscliffe (1836–1920), second wife of Sir John A. Macdonald, the first Prime Minister of Canada
- Agnes Randolph (c. 1312–1369), Countess of Dunbar and March

=== Others ===
==== Agnes ====
- Agnes, stage name of Swedish singer Agnes Carlsson (born 1988)

=== A ===
- Agnes Aanonsen (born 1966), Norwegian luger
- Agnes Dean Abbatt (1847–1917), American painter
- Agnes Abuom, Kenyan Christian organizational worker
- Agnes Acibu, Ugandan politician
- Agnes Jones Adams (1858–1923), American civil rights activist
- Agnes Addison (1842–1903), New Zealand draper
- Agnes Adler (1865–1935), Danish pianist
- Agnes Aduako (born 1989), Ghanaian footballer
- Agnes Aggrey-Orleans, Ghanaian diplomat
- Agnes Akiror (born 1968), Ugandan politician
- Agnes Baldwin Alexander (1875–1971), American author
- Agnes Alexiusson (born 1996), Swedish boxer
- Agnes Alfred (c. 1890–1992), Canadian storyteller and noblewoman
- Agnes Allafi (born 1959), Chadian politician and sociologist
- Agnes Allen (1898–1958), English children's book author
- Agnes Allen (baseball) (1930–2012), American baseball pitcher
- Agnes Alpers (born 1961), German politician and educator
- Agnes Ameede (born 1970), Ugandan politician
- Agnes Atim Apea, Uganda social entrepreneur
- Agnes Arber (1879–1960), British plant morphologist and anatomist, historian, and philosopher
- Agnes Arellano (born 1949), Philippine sculptor
- Agnès Armengol (1852–1934), Spanish writer, pianist, composer
- Agnes Armstrong (born 1959), Cook Islands politician
- Agnes Arvidsson (1875–1962), Swedish pharmacist
- Agnes Asche (1891–1966), German socialist
- Agnes Ashford (fl. 15th century), Christian evangelist
- Agnes Barr Auchencloss (1886–1972), medical officer at H.M. Factory Gretna, on the University of Glasgow Roll of Honour
- Agnes Ayres (1898–1940), American silent film star

=== B ===
- Agnes Baden-Powell (1858–1945), British pioneer, founder of the Girl Guides movement
- Agnes Bakkevig (1910–1992), Norwegian politician
- Agnes Baliques (1641–1700), Roman Catholic religious leader
- Agnes Ballard (1877–1969), American architect and educator
- Agnes Baltsa (born 1944), Greek mezzo-soprano singer
- Agnes Barker (1907–2008), Australian potter and craftworker
- Agnes Jeruto Barsosio (born 1983), Kenyan long-distance runner
- Agnes Sime Baxter (1870–1917), Canadian mathematician
- Agnes Beaumont (c. 1652–1720), English religious autobiographer
- Agnes Beckwith (1861–1951), English swimmer
- Agnes Benidickson (1920–2007), Canadian college chancellor
- Agnes Bennett (1872–1960), New Zealand doctor and Chief Medical Officer in World War I
- Agnes Benítez (born 1986), Puerto Rican beauty pageant titleholder
- Agnes Berger (1916–2002), Hungarian-American mathematician and professor
- Agnes Bernard (1842–1932), Roman Catholic nun
- Agnes Bernauer (1410–1435), morganatic wife of Albert III, Duke of Bavaria
- Agnes Bernelle (1923–1999), Berlin actress and singer
- Agnes Binagwaho, Rwandan pediatrician and college chancellor
- Agnes Forbes Blackadder (1875–1964), Scottish medic
- Agnes Blackie (1897–1975), New Zealand professor
- Agnes Blannbekin (c. 1244–1315), Austrian Beguine and Christian mystic
- Agnes Block (1629–1704), Dutch art collector and horticulturalist
- Agnes Bluhm (1862–1943), German medical doctor and Goethe medal recipient
- Agnes Body (1866–1952), British headmistress
- Agnes Bolsø (born 1953), Norwegian sociologist
- Agnes Booth (1843–1910), Australian-American actress
- Agnes Börjesson (1827–1900), Swedish painter
- Agnes Borrowman (1881–1955), Scottish pharmaceutical chemist
- Agnes Boulton (1893–1968), British-American pulp magazine writer
- Agnes Rose Bouvier Nicholl (1842–1892), English artist
- Agnes Bowker (born c. 1541, death date unknown), English domestic servant and alleged mother of a cat
- Agnes Branting (1862–1930), Swedish textile artist and writer
- Agnes M. Brazal, Filipina theologian
- Agnes Baldwin Brett (1876–1955), American numismatist and archaeologist
- Agnes Broun (1732–1820), mother of Scotland's national poet, Robert Burns
- Agnes Brown (1866–1943), Scottish suffragist and writer
- Agnes Bruckner, American actress and model
- Agnes Bugge (born before 1417 and died after 1430), English brewer
- Agnes Bulmer (1775–1836), English poet
- Agnes Buntine (c. 1822–1896), Scottish pastoralist and bullocky
- Agnes Burns (1762–1834), sister of Scotland's national poet, Robert Burns
- Agnes Busby (1800–1889), New Zealand pioneer
- Agnes Bushell (born 1949), American writer and teacher

=== C ===
- Agnes Callard (born 1976), Hungarian professor
- Agnes Kane Callum (1925–2015), American genealogist
- Agnes Deans Cameron (1863–1912), Canadian educator, writer, journalist, lecturer, and adventurer
- Agnes Campbell (1637–1716), Scottish businesswoman
- Agnes Canta (1888–1964), Dutch painter
- Agnes Carlsson (born 1988), Swedish pop star, better known by the mononym Agnes
- Agnes Castle (1860–1922), Irish author
- Agnes Catlow (1806–1889), British writer
- Agnes Chan (born 1955), Hong Kong-based singer, television personality, professor, essayist, and novelist
- Agnes Chan Tsz-ching (born 1996), Hong Kong rugby union player
- Agnes Charbonneau, American politician and educator
- Agnes Chavez, Cuban-American artist, educator, and social entrepreneur
- Agnes Asangalisa Chigabatia (born 1956), Ghanaian politician
- Agnes Chow (born 1996), Hong Kong-based politician and democratic activist
- Agnes Muriel Clay (1878–1962), English historian and writer
- Agnes Morley Cleaveland (1874–1958), American writer and cattle rancher
- Agnes Mary Clerke (1842–1907), Irish astronomer and writer
- Agnes Bell Collier (1860–1930), British mathematician
- Agnes Kalaniho'okaha Cope (1924–2015), Hawaiian historian and spiritual healer
- Agnes Conway (1885–1950), British writer, historian, and archaeologist
- Agnes Cotton (1828–1899), English social reformer and philanthropist
- Agnes Marshall Cowan (1880–1940), Scottish physician
- Agnes Cowen, Cherokee politician
- Agnes Curran (1920–2005), British prison governor

=== D ===
- Agnes d'Harcourt (died 1291), French author
- Agnes Dahlström (born 1991), Swedish footballer
- Agnes Davies (1920–2011), Welsh snooker and billiards player
- Agnes Dawson (1873–1953), British politician and trade unionist
- Agnes de Frumerie (1869–1937), Swedish artist
- Agnes de Lima (1887–1974), American journalist and writer
- Agnes de Mille (1905–1993), American dancer and choreographer
- Agnes De Nul (born 1955), Belgian actress
- Agnes de Selincourt (1872–1917), Indian Christian missionary
- Agnes de Silva (1895–1961), Sri Lankan woman's activist
- Agnes de Valence (born 1250), French noblewoman
- Agnes Mariam de la Croix (born 1952), Lebanese Christian nun, known as Mother Agnes
- Agnes Denes (born 1931), Hungarian-American artist
- Agnes Dennis (1859–1947), Canadian educator and feminist
- Agnes Devanadera (born 1950), Filipina lawyer and politician
- Agnes Digital (1997–2021), American-Japanese Thoroughbred racehorse
- Agnes Dobronski (1925–2013), American politician and educator
- Agnes Dollan (1887–1966), Scottish suffragette and political activist
- Agnes Dordzie, Ghanaian judge
- Agnes Meyer Driscoll (1889–1971), American cryptanalyst
- Agnes Mary Frances Duclaux (1857–1944), English poet, novelist, essayist, literary critic, and translator
- Agnes Dunbar (fl. late 14th century), Scottish mistress
- Agnes Duncan (1899–1996), Scottish singer and conductor
- Agnes Dürer (1475–1539), wife of the Roman painter, Albrecht Dürer
- Agnes Dusart (born 1962), Belgian racing cyclist

=== E ===
- Agnes Edwards (c. 1873–1928), Australian craftswoman
- Agnes Ell (1917–2003), New Zealand cricketer
- Agnes Ethel (1846–1903), American stage actress
- Agnes Gardner Eyre (1881–1950), American pianist, composer, and piano teacher

=== F ===
- Agnes Fabish (1873–1947), New Zealand domestic servant, farmer, and homemaker
- Agnes Mary Field (1896–1968), English film producer and director
- Agnes Fingerin (d. 1514), German businesswoman
- Agnes Finnie (died 1645), Scottish shopkeeper, moneylender, and tried witch
- Agnes Fleischer (1865–1909), Norwegian pioneering teacher for disabled persons
- Agnes Flight (born 1997), Japanese Thoroughbred racehorse
- Agnes Flora (1987–2005), Japanese bay racehorse
- Agnes Fogo, American renal pathologist and professor
- Agnes Fong Sock Har (born 1946), Singaporean military officer
- Agnes Freda Forres (1881–1942), British artist and sculptor
- Agnes Forster (died 1484), English prison reformer
- Agnes Franz (1794–1843), German writer
- Agnes Fraser (1876–1968), Scottish stage actress and soprano singer
- Agnes Freund (1866– after 1902), German stage actress
- Agnes Fry (1869–1958), British bryologist, astronomer, botanical illustrator, writer, and poet
- Agnes Moore Fryberger (1868–1939), American music educator

=== G ===
- Agnes Buen Garnås (born 1946), Norwegian folk singer
- Agnes Garrett (1845–1935), English suffragist and interior designer
- Agnes Gavin (1872–1947), Australian silent film actor and screenwriter
- Agnes Geene (born 1947), Dutch badminton player
- Agnes Gehrman (1893–1982), American politician
- Agnes Geijer (1898–1989), Swedish textile historian and archaeologist
- Agnes Geraghty (1907–1974), American swimmer
- Agnes Giberne (1845–1939), British novelist and scientific writer
- Agnes Giebel (1921–2017), German classical soprano
- Agnes Goode (1872–1947), Australian social and political activist, best known as Mrs. A. K. Goode
- Agnes Goodsir (1864–1939), Australian painter
- Agnes Gordon (1906–1967), Canadian bridge player
- Agnes Grebill (died 1511), English Lollard martyr
- Agnes Griffith (1969–2015), Grenadian sprinter
- Agnes Charlotte Gude (1863–1929), Norwegian watercolorist and illustrator
- Agnes Gund (born 1938), American philanthropist and art collector
- Agnes Günther (1863–1911), German writer
- Agnes Guppy-Volckman (1838–1917), British spiritualist medium

=== H ===
- Agnes Haakonsdatter (1290–1319), eldest daughter of King Haakkon V of Norway
- Agnes C. Hall (1777–1846), Scottish writer
- Agnes Hamilton (1868–1961), American social worker
- Agnes Sillars Hamilton (c. 1794–1870), Scottish reformer, public lecturer, phrenologist, and woman's rights activist
- Agnes Hammarskjöld (1866–1940), wife of Swedish nobleman and prime minister, Hjalmar Hammarskjöld
- Agnes Hamvas (born 1946), Hungarian archer
- Agnes Harben (1879–1961), British suffragist leader
- Agnes Hardie (1874–1951), British politician
- Agnes Ellen Harris (1883–1952), American educator
- Agnes Harrold (c. 1831–1903), New Zealand hotel manager, foster parent, nurse, and midwife
- Agnes Headlam-Morley (1902–1986), British historian and academic
- Agnes Heineken (1872–1954), German politician
- Agnes Henningsen (1868–1962), Danish writer and activist
- Agnes Herbert (late 1870s–1960), British writer and big game hunter
- Agnes M. Herzberg (1938–2026), Canadian statistician and professor
- Agnes Hewes (1874–1963), American children's author
- Agnes C. Higgins (1911–1985), Canadian nutritionist
- Agnes Hijman (born 1966), Dutch long-distance runner
- Agnes Leonard Hill (1842–1917), American journalist, author, poet, newspaper founder/publisher, evangelist, social reformer
- Agnes Hiorth (1899–1984), Norwegian painter
- Agnes Hitt (1845–1919), American patriotic organization leader
- Agnes Edith Holt White (1851–1933), English non-fiction writer and illustrator
- Agnes Hotot (fl. 1395), English noblewoman
- Agnes Hsu-Tang (born 1972), American archaeologist, art historian, and philanthropist
- Agnes Twiston Hughes (1895–1981), Welsh solicitor and politician
- Agnes Hultén (born 1973), Swedish politician
- Agnes Hundoegger (1858–1927), German musician and music teacher
- Agnes Hungerford (died 1523), English murderer
- Agnes Hunt (1866–1948), British nurse
- Agnes Huntington (ca. 1864–1953), American operatic singer
- Agnes Hürland-Büning (1926–2009), German politician
- Agnes Husband (1852–1929), Scottish politician: one of Dundee's first female councillors and suffragette
- Agnes Husslein (born 1954), Austrian art historian and art manager

=== I ===
- Agnes Ibbetson (1757–1823), English plant physiologist
- Agnes Igoye (born 1972), Ugandan social worker and campaigner against human trafficking
- Agnes Inglis (1870–1952), American anarchist and architect
- Agnes Irwin (1841–1914), American educator
- Agnes Israelson (1896–1989), American politician

=== J ===
- Agnes E. Jacomb (1866–1949), English novelist
- Agnes Janich (born 1985), Polish visual artist
- Agnes Janson (1861–1947), Swedish mezzo-soprano opera singer and recitalist
- Agnes Jekyll (1861–1937), Scottish-British artist, writer, and philanthropist
- Agnes Joaquim (1854–1899), Singaporean-Armenian botanist
- Agnes Christine Johnston (1896–1978), American screenwriter
- Agnes Jones (nurse) (1832–1868), Irish nurse
- Agnes Jongerius (born 1960), Dutch politician
- Agnes Jónsdóttir (died 1507), Icelandic Christian nun
- Agnes Jordan (before 1520–1546), English Roman Catholic abbess
- Agnes Joseph (born 1970), Dutch politician

=== K ===
- Agnes Kafula (born 1955), Namibian politician
- Agnes Kalibata, Rwandan agricultural scientist and policymaker
- Agnes Kant (born 1967), Dutch politician
- Agnes Kaposi (born 1932), British-Hungarian engineer and author
- Agnes Karll (1868–1927), German nurse and nursing reformer
- Agnes Kauzuu (born 1979), Namibian football goalkeeper
- Agnes Kehoe (1874–1959), American politician
- Agnes Newton Keith (1901–1982), American writer
- Agnes Gilmour Kent-Johnston (1893–1981), New Zealand community leader and broadcaster
- Agnes Kemp (1932–2025), Bahamian woman, strong in her faith and full of grace and humility. Best grandmother in the world.
- Agnes Kemp (1823–1908), American physician
- Agnes Keyser (1852–1941), English humanitarian, courtesan, and mistress
- Agnes Kharshiing, Indian woman's rights activist
- Agnes King (1919–2003), U.S. Virgin Islander historic preservationist and gardener
- Agnes Kiprop (born 1980), Kenyan long-distance runner
- Agnes Kirabo, Ugandan politician and legislator
- Ágnes Kiss (born 2005), Hungarian canoeist
- Agnes Kittelsen (born 1980), Norwegian actress
- Agnes Knochenhauer (born 1989), Swedish curler
- Agnes Konde, Ugandan businesswoman and corporate executive
- Agnes Kripps (1925–2014), Canadian politician
- Agnes Krumwiede (born 1977), German pianist and politician
- Agnes Kunihira (born 1966), Ugandan politician

=== L ===
- Agnes Lake (1887–1972), British suffragette
- Agnes Lam (born 1972), Macanese poet, educator, journalist, and politician
- Agnes Lange (1929–2021), German politician
- Agnes Larson (1892–1957), American historian
- Agnes Kwaje Lasuba (1948–2023), South Sudanese politician
- Agnes Latham (1905–1996), British academic and professor
- Agnes D. Lattimer (1928–2018), American pediatrician
- Agnes Lauchlan (1905–1993), British stage, film, and television actress
- Agnes Christina Laut (1871–1936), Canadian journalist, novelist, historian, and social worker
- Agnes Le Louchier (1660–1717), French royal mistress and spy
- Agnes Brand Leahy (1893–1934), American screenwriter
- Agnes Lee (1868–1939), American poet and translator
- Agnes Limbo (born 1957), Namibian politician
- Agnes Littlejohn (1865–1944), Australian writer
- Agnes Locsin (born 1957), Filipino dance choreographer
- Agnes Loheni (born 1971), New Zealand politician
- Agnes Lum (born 1956), American model and singer
- Agnes Lundell (1878–1936), Finnish lawyer
- Agnes Lunn (1850–1941), Danish painter and sculptor
- Agnes Lyall (1908–2013), American artist
- Agnes Lyle (1700s–1800s), British ballad singer
- Agnes Lyon (1762–1840), Scottish poet

=== M ===
- Agnes Syme Macdonald (1882–1966), Scottish suffragette
- Agnes Macdonell (c. 1840–1925), British writer and journalist
- Agnes Maule Machar (1837–1927), Canadian author, poet, and social reformer
- Agnes Mure Mackenzie (1891–1955), Scottish historian and writer
- Agnes Maclehose (1758–1841), Scottish woman who had an affair with Scottish poet and lyricist, Robert Burns
- Agnes Maxwell MacLeod (1783–1879), Scottish poet
- Agnes Macphail (1890–1954), Canadian politician
- Agnes Macready (1855–1935), Australian nurse and journalist
- Agnes Magnell (1878–1966), Swedish architect
- Agnes Magnúsdóttir (1795–1830), last person to be executed in Iceland
- Agnes Magpale (born 1942), Filipina educator and politician
- Agnes Catherine Maitland (1850–1906), English academic
- Agnes Mary Mansour (1931–2004), American Catholic nun, politician, and public official
- Agnes Marshall (1855–1905), English culinary entrepreneur, inventor, and celebrity chef
- Agnes Bernice Martin (1912–2004), Canadian-American abstract painter
- Agnes Marwa (born 1978), Tanzanian politician
- Agnes Mason (1849–1941), British nun
- Agnes Katharina Maxsein (1904–1991), German politician
- Agnes McCullough (1888–1967), Irish teacher, philanthropist, and activist
- Agnes McDonald (1829–1906), New Zealand settler, nurse, postmistress, and teacher
- Agnes McLaren (1837–1913), Scottish doctor
- Agnes McLean (1918–1994), Scottish trade unionist and politician
- Agnes McWhinney (1891–1987), Australian solicitor
- Agnes Mellers (died 1513/1514), English co-founder of Nottingham High School
- Agnes E. Meyer (1887–1970), American journalist, philanthropist, civil rights activist, and art patron
- Agnes Meyer-Brandis (born 1973), German artist
- Agnes Kirsopp Lake Michels (1909–1993), American scholar
- Agnes Miegel (1879–1964), German author, journalist, and poet
- Agnes Milne (1851–1919), Australian suffragist
- Agnes Milowka (1981–2011), Australian technical driver, underwater photographer, author, maritime archaeologist, and cave explorer
- Agnes Woods Mitchell (1802–1844), Scottish-American writer and schoolteacher
- Agnes Mizere, Malawian TV personality, journalist, and blogger
- Agnez Mo (born 1986), Indonesian pop star
- Agnes Mongan (1905–1996), American art historian and curator
- Agnes Marion Moodie (1881–1969), Scottish chemist
- Agnes Dunbar Moodie Fitzgibbon (1833–1913), Canadian artist
- Agnes Claypole Moody (1870–1954), American zoologist and professor
- Agnes Moore (born 1979), American entertainer who performs as Peppermint (drag queen)
- Agnes Moorehead (1900–1974), American actress
- Agnes Morgan (1879–1976), American director, playwright, actress, and theatrical producer
- Agnes Fay Morgan (1884–1968), American chemist and academic
- Agnes Thomas Morris (1865–1949), American writer and clubwoman
- Agnes Morrison (1867–1934), Scottish charity worker
- Agnes Morton (1872–1952), British tennis player
- Agnes Mowinckel (1875–1963), Norwegian actress and theatre director
- Agnes Mukabaranga, Rwandan politician
- Agnes Mulder (born 1973), Dutch politician
- Agnes Murgoci (1875–1929), Australian-English zoologist and folklorist
- Agnes G. Murphy (1865–1931), Irish journalist and writer
- Agnes Muthspiel (1914–1966), Austrian painter

=== N ===
- Agnes Naa Momo Lartey (born 1976), Ghanaian politician
- Agnes Nalwanga (born 1975), Ugandan businesswoman, management professional, and corporate executive
- Agnes Namyalo (born c. 1975), Ugandan banker and corporate executive
- Agnes Nandutu, Ugandan journalist, politician, and Minister
- Agnes Nanogak (1925–2001), Canadian artist
- Agnes Ndirubusa, Burundian journalist and war correspondent
- Agnes Nestor (1880–1948), American labor leader, politician, and social reformer
- Agnes Neuerer, Austrian luger
- Agnes Neuhaus (1854–1944), German social worker and politician
- Agnes Ng Siew Heok, or simply Agnes Ng, Singaporean murder victim of the Toa Payoh child murders in 1981
- Agnes Nicholls (1876–1959), English soprano
- Agnes Nixon (1922–2016), American television writer and producer
- Agnes Northrop (1857 – 1953), American glass artist, known for designs for Louis Comfort Tiffany
- Agnes Nyalonje, Malawian politician
- Agnes Nyanhongo (born 1960), Zimbabwean sculptor
- Agnes Nyblin (1869–1945), Norwegian photographer
- Agnes Nygaard Haug (born 1933), Norwegian judge

=== O ===
- Agnes O'Casey (born 1995/1996), English actress
- Agnes O'Farrelly (1874–1951), Irish academic and professor
- Agnes Oaks (born 1970), Estonian ballerina
- Agnes Obel (born 1980), Danish indie folk singer-songwriter and pianist
- Agnes Odhiambo, Kenyan accountant, financial manager, and civil servant
- Agnes Odhiambo, Kenyan female human rights activist
- Agnes Okoh (1905–1995), Nigerian Christian evangelist
- Agnes Osazuwa (born 1989), Nigerian track and field sprinter
- Agnes Elisabeth Overbeck (1870–1919), Anglo-Russian composer and pianist
- Agnes Owens (1926–2014), Scottish author
- Agnes Ozman (1870–1937), American evangelical

=== P ===
- Agnes Pardaens (born 1956), Belgian long-distance runner
- Agnes Pareyio (born 1956), Kenyan woman's rights activist, politician, and businesswoman
- Agnes Miller Parker (1895–1980), Scottish engraver, illustrator, and painter
- Agnes Parsons (1884–1970), American screenwriter
- Agnes Lawrence Pelton (1881–1961), German painter
- Agnes Penemulungu, Malawian politician
- Agnes Pihlava (born 1980), Polish musician
- Agnes Baker Pilgrim (1924–2019), Native American spiritual elder
- Agnes Plum (1869–1951), German politician
- Agnes Pochin (1825–1908), British woman's rights activist
- Agnes Pockels (1862–1935), German chemist
- Agnes Blake Poor (1842–1922), American author and translator, known professionally as Dorothy Prescott
- Agnes Porter (c. 1752–1814), British governess
- Agnes Potten (died 1556), English prisoner who was burned at the stake
- Agnes Prest (died 1557), Cornish Protestant martyr

=== Q ===
- Agnes Quaye (born 1989), Ghanaian footballer
- Agnes J. Quirk (1884–1974), American bacteriologist, plant pathologist, and inventor
- Agnes Quisumbing, Filipino economist and academic

=== R ===
- Agnes Raeburn (1872–1955), Scottish artist
- Agnes Ramsey (died 1399), English businesswoman
- Agnes Ravatn (born 1983), Norwegian novelist, columnist, and journalist
- Agnes Regan (1869–1943), American Roman Catholic social reformer
- Agnes Rehni (1887–1966), Danish stage and film actress
- Agnes Reisch (born 1999), German ski jumper
- Agnes Repplier (1855–1950), American essayist
- Agnes Reston (1771–1856), Scottish wartime nurse, also known as the Heroine of Matagorda
- Agnes Kay Eppers Reynders (born 1971), Bolivian road cyclist
- Agnes Richards (1883–1967), American psychiatric nurse
- Agnes Millen Richmond (1870–1964), American painter
- Agnes Richter (1844–1918), German seamstress
- Agnes Ludwig Riddle (1865–1930), American politician
- Agnes Jane Robertson (1893–1959), English historian
- Agnes Kelly Robertson (1833–1916), Scottish-American stage actress
- Agnes Robertson Robertson (1882–1968), Australian schoolteacher, community worker, and politician
- Agnes L. Rogers (1884–1943), Scottish educator and psychologist
- Agnes Romilly White (1872–1945), Irish novelist
- Agnes Rose-Soley (1847–1938), Scottish-Australian journalist and poet
- Agnes Rossi (born 1959), American fiction writer
- Agnes Rothery (1888–1954), American writer
- Agnes Ryan (1878–1954), American pacifist, vegetarian, suffragist, and journal editor

=== S ===
- Agnes Salm-Salm (1844–1912), American wife of Prince Felix zu Salm-Salm
- Agnes Sam (born 1942), South African writer
- Agnes Samaria (born 1972), Namibian middle-distance runner
- Agnes Sampson (died 1591), Scottish purported witch
- Agnes Samuelson (1887–1963), American educator and school superintendent
- Agnes Sander-Plump (1888–1980), German painter
- Agnes Sandström (1887–1985), Swedish Titanic survivor
- Agnes Sanford (1897–1982), American writer
- Agnes Yewande Savage (1906–1964), Nigerian medical doctor and physician
- Agnes Scanlon (1923–2018), American politician
- Agnes Schierhuber (born 1946), Austrian politician
- Agnes Schmidt (1875–1952), German activist and politician
- Agnes M. Sigurðardóttir (born 1954), Icelandic prelate
- Agnes Simon (1935–2020), Hungarian table tennis player
- Agnes Simons (died 1985), American politician
- Agnes Sjöberg (1888–1964), Finnish veterinarian
- Agnes Elizabeth Slack (1858–1946), English Temperance advocate
- Agnes Sligh Turnbull (1888–1982), American writer
- Agnes Slott-Møller (1862–1937), Danish painter
- Agnes Smedley (1892–1950), American journalist, writer, and activist
- Agnes Smidt (1874–1952), Danish painter
- Agnes Smith Lewis (1843–1926), Scottish travel writer alongside her twin sister, Margaret
- Agnes Smyth (c. 1755–1783), Irish Methodist preacher
- Agnes Sorma (1862–1927), German actress
- Agnes Stavenhagen (1860–1945), German operatic soprano
- Agnes Steele (1881–1949), American actress
- Agnes Steineger (1863–1965), Norwegian painter
- Agnes Stevenson (1873–1935), British chess player
- Agnes Grainger Stewart (1871–1956), Scottish writer
- Agnes L. Storrie (1864–1936), Australian poet and writer
- Agnes Straub (1890–1941), German film actress
- Agnes Street-Klindworth (1825–1906), illegitimate daughter of Danish journalist, actor, and diplomat Georg Klindworth
- Agnes Strickland (1796–1874), English writer and poet
- Agnes Surriage Frankland (1726–1783), American tavern maid who married British baronet Sir Charles Henry
- Agnes Syme Lister (1834–1893), Scottish botanist

=== T ===
- Agnes Taaka (born 1980), Ugandan politician, social worker, and legislator
- Agnes Tachyon (1998–2009), Japanese Thoroughbred racehorse
- Agnes Oforiwa Tagoe-Quarcoopome (1913–1997), Ghanaian activist
- Agnes Tait (1894–1981), American painter, artist, lithographer, muralist, and dancer
- Agnes Takea (died 1622), Japanese Roman Catholic martyr
- Agnes Clara Tatham (1893–1972), English painter
- Agnes Taubert (1844–1877), German writer and philosopher
- Agnes Taylor (1821–1911), English Mormon pioneer
- Agnes Reeves Taylor (born 1965), ex-wife of former Liberian President, Charles Taylor
- Agnes Terei, Vanuatuan educator and politician
- Agnes Le Thi Thanh, one of the Vietnamese Martyrs
- Agnes Thomas Morris (1865–1949), American writer and clubwoman
- Agnes Tibayeita Isharaza, Ugandan lawyer and corporate executive
- Agnes Tirop (1995–2021), Kenyan long-distance runner
- Agnes Tjongarero (born 1946), Namibian politician
- Agnes Tschetschulin (1859–1942), Finnish composer and violinist
- Agnes Tschurtschenthaler (born 1982), Italian middle- and long-distance runner
- Agnes Tuckey (1877–1972), English tennis player
- Agnes TuiSamoa (1932–2004), New Zealand community organizer and social worker
- Agnes Tyrrell (1846–1883), Czech composer and pianist

=== U ===
- Agnes Ullmann (1927–2019), French microbiologist

=== V ===
- Agnes van Ardenne (born 1950), Dutch politician and diplomat
- Agnes van den Bossche (c. 1435–c. 1504), Dutch painter
- Agnes Vanderburg (1901–1989), Native American teacher, translator, and author
- Agnes Gertrude VanKoughnet (1860–1940), Canadian socialite
- Agnes Varis (1930–2011), American businesswoman and philanthropist
- Agnes van Stolk (1898–1980), Dutch artist
- Agnes Vernon (1895–1948), American silent film actress
- Agnes Nebo von Ballmoos (1938–2000), Liberian professor, conductor, composer, and lawyer
- Agnes von Konow (1868–1944), Finnish animal rights advocate
- Agnes von Krusenstjerna (1894–1940), Swedish writer
- Agnes von Kurowsky (1892–1984), American nurse during World War I with whom Ernest Hemingway fell in love
- Agnes von Mansfeld-Eisleben (1551–1637), German countess
- Agnes von Rosen (1924–2001), Swedish aristocrat, bullfighter, and stunt performer
- Agnes von Zahn-Harnack (1884–1950), German teacher, writer, and woman's rights activist

=== W ===
- Agnes Walsh (born 1950), Canadian poet, playwright, actor, and storyteller
- Agnes Marion McLean Walsh (1884–1967), Australian nurse
- Agnes Warburg (1872–1953), British photographer
- Agnes Ward White (1857–1943), wife of Albert B. White, the former Governor of West Virginia
- Agnes Waterhouse (c. 1503–1566), English woman accused of witchcraft
- Agnes Waters (1893–1962), American politician and realtor
- Agnes Baldwin Webb (1926–2001), American basketball player
- Agnes Weinrich (1873–1946), American visual artist
- Agnes Welin (1844–1928), Swedish missionary
- Agnes E. Wells (1876–1959), American educator and women's equal rights activist
- Agnes Wenman (died 1617), English Roman Catholic translator
- Agnes Wergeland (1857–1914), Norwegian-American historian, poet, and educator
- Agnes Westbrook Morrison (1854–1939), American lawyer
- Agnes Weston (1840–1918), English philanthropist
- Agnes Weston (1879–1972), New Zealand politician
- Agnes Wheeler (bap. 1734–1804), British writer
- Agnes Burns Wieck (1892–1966), American labor activist and journalist
- Agnes Wieslander (1873–1934), Swedish painter
- Agnes Windeck (1888–1975), German theatre and film actress
- Agnes Wolbert (born 1958), Dutch politician
- Agnes Wold (born 1955), Swedish biologist and professor
- Agnes Wood (1921–2013), New Zealand artist and writer
- Agnes Woodward (1872–1938), American music educator and whistler
- Agnes World (1995–2012), American-bred Japanese Thoroughbred racehorse and sire
- Agnes Wright Spring (1894–1988), American journalist, writer, and historian

=== Y ===
- Agnes Yombwe (born 1966), Zambian mixed media artist, arts educator, author, and mentor

=== Z ===
- Agnes Zawadzki (born 1994), American figure skater
- Agnes Zimmermann (1847–1925), German pianist and composer
- Agnes Zurowski (1920–2013), American baseball pitcher

=== Fictional characters ===
- Agnes Bell, a main character of Oku-sama wa Mahō Shōjo: Bewitched Agnes
- Agnes Grey, central character in the eponymous novel by Anne Brontë
- Agnes Gru, a character in the Despicable Me franchise
- Agnés Oblige, a main character from the role-playing game Bravely Default
- Agnes O'Connor, the "nosy neighbor" disguise of witch Agatha Harkness in WandaVision, to which Agatha reverts due to Wanda's mind control between WandaVision and Agatha All Along

=== Ágnes ===
- Ágnes Babos (1944–2020), Hungarian handball player
- Ágnes Bartha (1922–2018), Hungarian photographer
- Ágnes Bukta (born 1993), Hungarian tennis player
- Ágnes Bánfai (1947–2020), Hungarian gymnast
- Ágnes Bánfalvy (born 1954), Hungarian actress
- Ágnes Bíró (1917–2008), Hungarian swimmer
- Ágnes Csomor (born 1979), Hungarian actress
- Ágnes Dobó (born 1988), Hungarian model and beauty pageant titleholder
- Ágnes Dragos, Hungarian sprint canoer
- Ágnes Esterházy (1891–1956), Hungarian actress
- Ágnes Farkas (born 1973), Hungarian handball player
- Ágnes Ferencz (born 1956), Hungarian sport shooter
- Ágnes Fodor (born 1964), Hungarian swimmer
- Ágnes Gajdos-Hubai (1948–2014), Hungarian volleyball player
- Ágnes Gee (born 1974), Hungarian tennis player
- Ágnes Gergely (born 1933), Hungarian writer, educator, journalist, and translator
- Ágnes Gerlach (born 1968), Hungarian diver
- Ágnes Geréb (born 1952), Hungarian gynaecologist and psychologist
- Ágnes Hankiss (1950–2021), Hungarian politician
- Ágnes Hegedűs, Hungarian orienteer
- Ágnes Heller (1929–2019), Hungarian philosopher and lecturer
- Ágnes Herczeg, Hungarian artist
- Ágnes Herczegh (born 1950), Hungarian discus thrower
- Ágnes Hornyák (born 1982), Hungarian handball player
- Ágnes Hranitzky, Hungarian film editor and director
- Ágnes Juhász-Balajcza (born 1952), Hungarian volleyball player
- Ágnes Kaczander (born 1953), Hungarian swimmer
- Ágnes Keleti (1921–2025), Hungarian-Israeli Olympic champion artistic gymnast
- Ágnes Konkoly (born 1987), Hungarian model, wedding planner, and beauty pageant titleholder
- Ágnes Kovács (disambiguation), multiple persons
- Ágnes Kozáry (born 1966), Hungarian sprinter
- Ágnes Kunhalmi (born 1982), Hungarian politician
- Ágnes Lehóczky (born 1976), Hungarian poet, academic, and translator
- Ágnes Litter (born 1975), Hungarian alpine skier
- Ágnes Lukács (1920–2016), Hungarian-Jewish painter, graphic artist, and school teacher
- Ágnes Miskó (born 1971), Hungarian gymnast
- Ágnes Mócsy, Romanian physicist
- Ágnes Molnár (born 1956), Hungarian politician
- Ágnes Mutina (born 1988), Hungarian swimmer
- Ágnes Nagy (born 1992), Hungarian footballer
- Ágnes Nemes Nagy (1922–1991), Hungarian poet, writer, educator, and translator
- Ágnes Németh (born 1961), Hungarian basketball player
- Ágnes Osztolykán (born 1974), Hungarian politician and activist
- Ágnes Pallag (born 1993), Hungarian volleyball player
- Ágnes Pozsonyi, Hungarian sprint canoer
- Ágnes Primász (born 1980), Hungarian water polo player
- Ágnes Rapai (born 1952), Hungarian poet, writer, and translator
- Ágnes Ságvári (1928–2000), Hungarian historian
- Ágnes Simon (born 1974), Romanian cross-country skier
- Ágnes Simor (born 1979), Hungarian actress and dancer
- Ágnes Sipka (born 1954), Hungarian long-distance runner
- Ágnes Studer (born 1998), Hungarian basketball player
- Ágnes Szatmári (born 1987), Romanian tennis player
- Ágnes Szávay (born 1988), Hungarian tennis player
- Ágnes Szendrei, Hungarian-American mathematician
- Ágnes Szentannai (born 1994), Hungarian curler
- Ágnes Szijj (born 1956), Hungarian rower
- Ágnes Szilágyi (born 1990), Hungarian handball player
- Ágnes Szokolszky (born 1956), Hungarian educator and psychologist
- Ágnes Torma (born 1951), Hungarian volleyball player
- Ágnes Triffa (born 1987), Hungarian handball goalkeeper
- Ágnes Vadai (born 1974), Hungarian politician and scholar
- Ágnes Valkai (born 1981), Hungarian water polo player
- Ágnes Huszár Várdy (died 2022), Hungarian writer
- Ágnes Végh (born 1939), Hungarian handball player

=== Agnès ===
- Agnès Acker (born 1940), French astrophysicist and professor
- Agnès Agboton (born 1960), Beninese writer, poet, storyteller, and translator
- Agnès Arnauld (1593–1672), abbess of Port-Royal and major figure in French Jansenism
- Agnès Barthélémy, French physicist
- Agnès Bénassy-Quéré (born 1966), French economist
- Agnès Bernet (born 1968), French cell biologist and professor
- Agnès Bihl, French singer
- Agnès Buzyn (born 1962), French hematologist, professor, medical practitioner, and politician
- Agnès Cabrol (1964–2007), French Egyptologist
- Agnès Callamard (born 1965), French human rights expert and Secretary General of Amnesty International
- Agnès Chiquet (born 1984), French weightlifter
- Agnès Clancier (born 1963), French writer
- Agnès de La Barre de Nanteuil (1922–1944), French Resistance worker
- Agnès Delahaie (1920–2003), French film producer
- Agnès Desarthe (born 1966), French novelist, children's writer, and translator
- Agnès Evren (born 1970), French politician
- Agnès Fienga, French astronomer
- Agnès Firmin-Le Bodo (born 1968), French politician
- Agnès Godard (born 1951), César Award-winning French cinematographer
- Agnès Gosselin (born 1967), French figure skater
- Agnès Grondin, Canadian politician
- Agnès Gruda, Polish-Canadian journalist and fiction writer
- Agnès Henry-Hocquard (born 1962), French winemaker
- Agnès Humbert (1894–1963), art historian, ethnographer and member of the French Resistance during World War II
- Agnès Jaoui (born 1964), French screenwriter, film director, actress and singer
- Agnès Kraidy (born 1965), Ivorian magazine editor and journalist
- Agnès Lacheux (born 1974), French Paracanoeist
- Agnès Laurent (1936–2010), French actress
- Agnès Le Brun (born 1961), French politician
- Agnès Le Lannic, French table tennis player
- Agnès Lefort (1891–1973), Canadian artist, educator, and gallery owner
- Agnès Letestu (born 1971), French ballet dancer
- Agnès Maltais (born 1956), Canadian politician
- Agnès Marin (1997–2011), French murder victim
- Agnès Martin-Lugand (born 1979), French novelist
- Agnès Matoko, Romanian model
- Agnès Mellon (born 1958), French soprano
- Agnès Mercier, French curler and coach
- Agnès Merlet (born 1959), French film director
- Agnès Nkada (born 1995), Cameroonian footballer
- Agnès Ntamabyaliro Rutagwera (born 1937), Rwandan politician
- Agnès Pannier-Runacher (born 1974), French businesswoman and politician
- Agnès Poirier (born 1975), French journalist, writer, and broadcaster
- Agnès Raharolahy (born 1992), French sprinter
- Agnès Rosenstiehl (born 1941), French author and illustrator
- Agnès Soral (born 1960), Franco-Swiss actress, comedian, and writer
- Agnès Sorel (1421–1450), favorite mistress of King Charles VII of France
- Agnès Souret (1902–1928), French-Basque actress
- Agnès Spaak (born 1944), French-Belgian actress and photographer
- Agnès Sulem (born 1959), French mathematician
- Agnès Tchuinté (1959–1990), Cameroonian javelin thrower
- Agnès Teppe (born 1968), French discus thrower
- Agnès Thill (born 1964), French politician
- Agnès Thurnauer (born 1962), French-Swiss artist
- Agnès Troublé (born 1941), French fashion designer Agnès b.
- Agnès Varda (1928–2019), French movie director
- Agnès Vesterman, French classical cellist
- Agnès Zugasti (born 1972), French tennis player

=== Agness ===
- Agness Gidna, Tanzanian paleontologist
- Agness Musase (born 1997), Zambian footballer
- Agness Underwood (1902–1984), American journalist and newspaper editor

=== Agnieszka ===
- Agnieszka Radwańska (born 1989), Polish tennis player

== See also ==
- Juana Inés de la Cruz (Iohanna Agnes of the Cross), scholar, poet, nun and a writer
