= Balajcza =

Balajcza is a Hungarian surname. Notable people with the name include:

- Ágnes Juhász-Balajcza (born 1952), Hungarian volleyball player
- Szabolcs Balajcza (born 1979), Hungarian footballer
- Tibor Balajcza (born 1937), Hungarian racewalker
