= Anna Åkesson =

Finnish writer and legal advocate

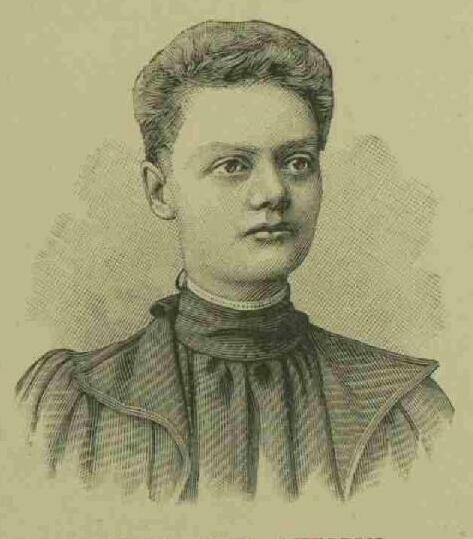
- Born: 28 September 1865; Kuopio
- Died: 5 November 1940 (aged 75); Helsinki
- Parent(s): Axel Erik Åkesson; Anna Mathilda Boije af Gennäs

Anna Maria Katarina Åkesson (28 September 1865 – 5 November 1940) was a Finnish legal advocate and novelist. She and Signe Silén are the earliest known women to work as advocates in Finnish courts.

Anna Åkesson was born on 28 September 1865 in Kuopio, the daughter of physician Axel Eric Åkesson and baroness Anna Mathilda Boije af Gennäs. While her three brothers studied law at the University of Helsinki, she attended the Fruntimmersskolan i Viborg. She then worked for several decades for the law office of male advocate Ivar Schröder in Viborg, regularly delivering documents and appearing in court on his behalf. However, in 1896, a male advocate complained about her presence and she was suddenly no longer able to work as an advocate. Despite support from the press and from feminist organizations, the ban on women advocates was upheld by the court of appeal and she was unable to obtain a dispensation from the Senate of Finland. Changes to the law in 1898 required advocates to have a law degree, blocking from law practice many men and all women until Agnes Lundell obtained a law degree and became Finland's first female lawyer in 1911.

In her novel Gertude Wiede (1909), the title character is the daughter of a Finnish judge who is disillusioned when she discovers that her father is collaborating with the Russian governor. She travels Europe and becomes politically engaged, attracted to the Russian revolutionaries, and falls in love with a revolutionary leader. However, she ultimately rejects revolutionary violence and returns to Finland to work on behalf of her country. Her short story "Till Tings" (“To the assizes”, 1911) is an autobiographical account of three female law clerks working under a largely absent male advocate.

Anna Åkesson died on 5 November 1940 in Helsinki.

== Bibliography ==
- Gertrud Wiede. Hfors 1909.
- Under traditioners välde. Idun 1911.
