= Kirabo =

Kirabo is both a given name and a surname. Notable people with the name include:

- Kirabo Jackson, American economist
- Kirabo Namutebi (born 2005), Ugandan swimmer
- Agnes Kirabo, Ugandan politician
- Vincent Kirabo (born 1955), Ugandan bishop
- Aisa Kirabo Kacyira (1963 or 1964–2025), Rwandese diplomat
