= Agnes Kunihira =

Ugandan politician

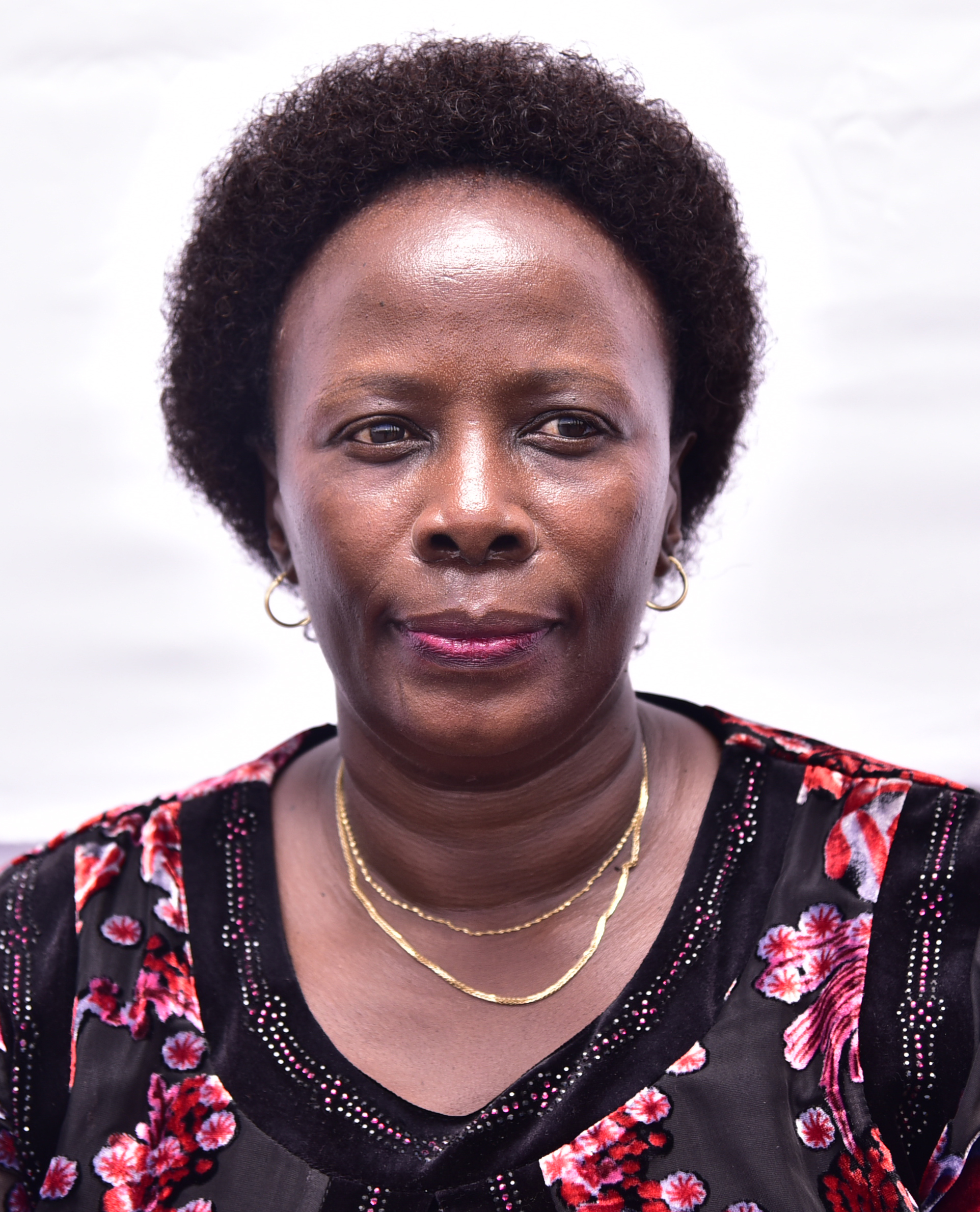
- Born: 14 July 1966 (age 59)
- Education: Haibale Primary School; Modern Secondary School; Makerere Adult School; Uganda Management Institute
- Alma mater: Makerere University; Uganda Management Institute; Federation of Uganda Employers; College of Insurance, Kenya
- Occupation: politician

Agnes Kunihira is a member of the Parliament of Uganda, representing workers. She belongs to the ruling National Resistance Movement party.

== Background ==
She was born on the 14 July 1966.

== Education ==
Below is her detailed education background:

Year attained	Qualification	Type	Institution
1981	PLE	Primary Leaving Examinations	Haibale Primary School
2004	UCE	Uganda Certificate of Education	Modern Secondary School
2005	UACE	Uganda Advanced Certificate of Education	Makerere Adult School
2007	Diploma in Administration	Diploma	Uganda Management Institute
2010	Bachelor of Adult and Community Education	Bachelors Degree	Makerere University
2014	Certificate in Female Future Programme	Certificate	Federation of Uganda Employers
2014	Trustee Development Programme Certificate	Certificate	College of Insurance, Kenya
2015	Postgraduate Diploma in Project Planning and Management	Postgraduate Diploma	Uganda Management Institute

== Career ==
Here is her career history:

Job Title	Organisation	Period of work
Community Liaison Officer	Rift Valley Railways (U) Ltd	2011-2016
Administrative Secretary	Rift Valley Railways (U) Ltd	2006-2010
Personal Secretary	Uganda Railways Corporation	2001-2006
Clerical Officer	Uganda Railways Corporation	1989-2000
Member of Parliament	Parliament of Uganda	2016 to date

== Additional role ==
Agnes serves on additional role at the Parliament of Uganda as the Chairperson Committee on Gender, Labour and Social Development.

== See also ==
- List of members of the tenth Parliament of Uganda
- Parliament of Uganda
