= Ágnes Mócsy =

Physicist

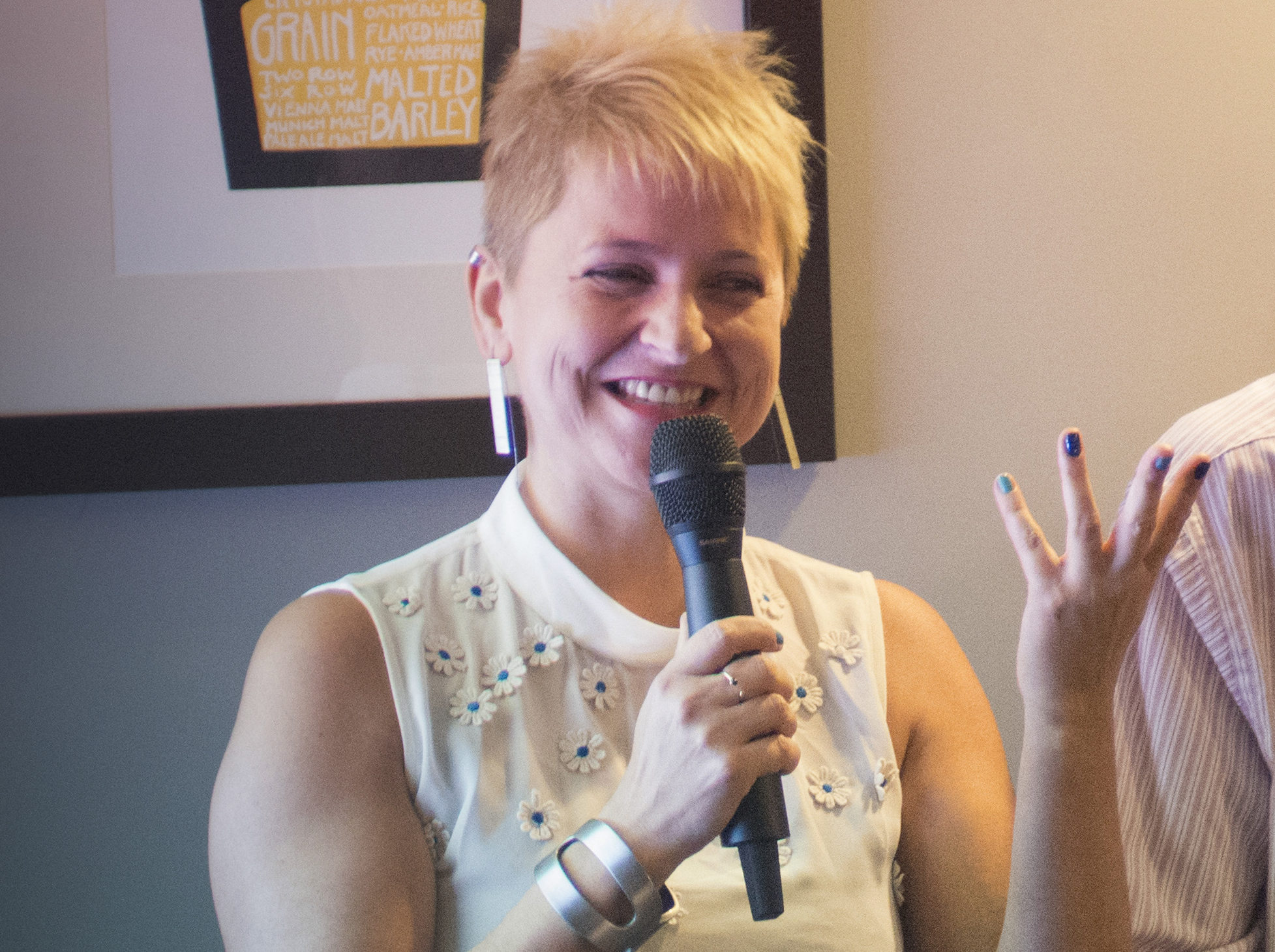
- Ágnes Mócsy speaking at Brookhaven National Laboratory in 2015
- Education: University of Minnesota; University of Bergen; Babeș-Bolyai University
- Scientific career
- Workplaces: Pratt Institute; Brookhaven National Laboratory; Niels Bohr Institute; Goethe University Frankfurt
- Thesis: Non-Equilibrium Aspects of Chiral Field Theories (2001)
- Doctoral advisor: J. Kapusta

Ágnes Mócsy is a Professor of Physics at the Pratt Institute who works on theoretical nuclear physics. She is also a filmmaker, science communicator and a Fellow of the American Physical Society.

== Education and early career ==
Mócsy grew up in the Transylvania region of Romania, where she was a part of the Hungarian minority in the region. She completed her bachelor's degree at Babeș-Bolyai University in 1989. She went on to earn a master's degree physics at the University of Bergen. She then moved to the University of Minnesota, culminating in a PhD in physics. Her thesis focused on the phase diagram of quantum chromodynamics. In particular, she studied quarkonia.

== Research ==
She was a postdoctoral researcher at Goethe University Frankfurt, the Niels Bohr Institute as an Alexander von Humboldt Research Fellow, and the RIKEN-BNL research center at Brookhaven National Laboratory.

Mócsy joined the Pratt Institute in 2008, where she teaches astronomy and physics for architects and designers. She was elected a Fellow of the American Physical Society in 2016 for her innovative exploration of the intersection of science and art. In 2017 Mócsy's first documentary film, Smashing Matters: Behind the Science Scene, premiered at the New Haven Documentary Film Festival. The film looks behind the scenes at the international conference Quark Matters and explores the work that goes on at the Relativistic Heavy Ion Collider and Large Hadron Collider. She screened the film at CERN in February 2017. For 2018 and 2019, Mócsy is a Visiting Professor in the Physics Department at Yale University. Mócsy is on the board of SistersMATR, a public engagement project that looks to engage young women of colour in physics. She has written for HuffPost on the popular misconception that discoveries in physics are made by lone, usually male geniuses.
