= Agnes M. Brazal =

Filipina theologian

Agnes M. Brazal is a Filipina theologian, known for her work in feminist theology, a theology of migration, and cybertheology.

== Biography ==
Brazal received her first degree in 1981, a BS in management engineering from Ateneo de Manila University in Quezon City, Philippines. She later pursued studies in theology, first at Maryhill School of Theology in Quezon City, before completing a STL (1994) and a SThD (1998), both from the Katholieke Universiteit Leuven in Belgium.

She taught at Maryhill School of Theology (1998–2012), St. Vincent School of Theology (2012–2015), and, since 2016, has been at De La Salle University, where she is presently a full professor in theology and religious education. She was a founding member and past president of the Catholic Theological Society of the Philippines (DaKaTeo) and a founding member and past president of the Ecclesia of Women in Asia (EWA), an organization that encourages Catholic Asian female theologians to be heard as equal partners with male theologians.

== Works ==
- Brazal, Agnes M.; Si, Andrea Lizares, eds. (2007). Body and Sexuality: Theological-pastoral Perspectives of Women in Asia. Quezon City: Ateneo University Press. ISBN 978-971-550-516-1.
- Brazal, Agnes M.; Abraham, Kochurani, eds. (2014). Feminist Cyberethics in Asia: Religious Discourses on Human Connectivity. New York: Palgrave Macmillan. ISBN 978-1-137-39586-3.
- Brazal, Agnes M.; De Guzman, Emmanuel S. (2015). Intercultural Church: Bridge of Solidarity in the Migration Context. Borderless Press. ISBN 978-0-9962017-0-4.
- Brazal, Agnes M.; Davila, Maria Theresa, eds. (2016). Living With(Out) Borders: Catholic Theological Ethics on the Migrations of Peoples. Maryknoll, NY: Orbis Books. ISBN 978-1-60833-633-3.
- Snyder, Susanna; Brazal, Agnes M.; Ralston, Joshua, eds. (2016). Church in an Age of Global Migration: A Moving Body. New York: Palgrave Macmillan. ISBN 978-1-137-51812-5.
- Brazal, Agnes M. (2019). A Theology of Southeast Asia: Liberation-Postcolonial Ethics in the Philippines. Maryknoll, NY: Orbis Books. ISBN 978-1-60833-758-3.
