= Agnes Blake Poor =

American author (1842–1922)

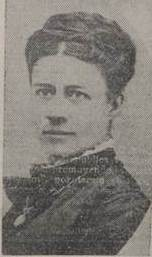
- Born: November 10, 1842; Bangor
- Died: February 28, 1922; Brookline
- Occupations: Writer, translator, poet

Agnes Blake Poor (November 10, 1842 – February 28, 1922) was an American author and translator. She wrote under her own name and the pen name Dorothy Prescott. She is thought to be the first American to translate Brazilian poetry from Portuguese into English.

Agnes Blake Poor was born on November 10, 1842 in Bangor, Maine. She was the daughter of financial analyst Henry Varnum Poor and Mary Wild Pierce, daughter of Reverend John Pierce, minister of the First Church of Brookline, Massachusetts. She lived most of her life in Brookline.

She published short fiction in various magazines under the name Dorothy Prescott. One story in The Century called "A Little Fool" (October 1896) caused an uproar because of comments made by the title character directed at South Boston that were thought to be derogatory.

Poor compiled and translated a selection of Spanish and Portuguese poems from South America, published as Pan American Poems (1918). It was the only selection of Portuguese translations available in the early 20th century. Poor, who taught Portuguese, included works by Antônio Gonçalves Dias (1823-1864), Bruno Seabra (1837-1876), and Francisco Manuel de Nascimento (1734-1819), though the latter had not been to Brazil.

Agnes Blake Poor died on 28 February 1922 in Brookline.

== Bibliography ==
- Andover memorials (1883)
- Brothers and strangers (1893)
- Boston neighbors in town and out (1898)
- Under guiding stars (1905)
- My four great grandmothers (1918)
- Pan American Poems (1918)
