= Agnès Martin-Lugand =

French novelist

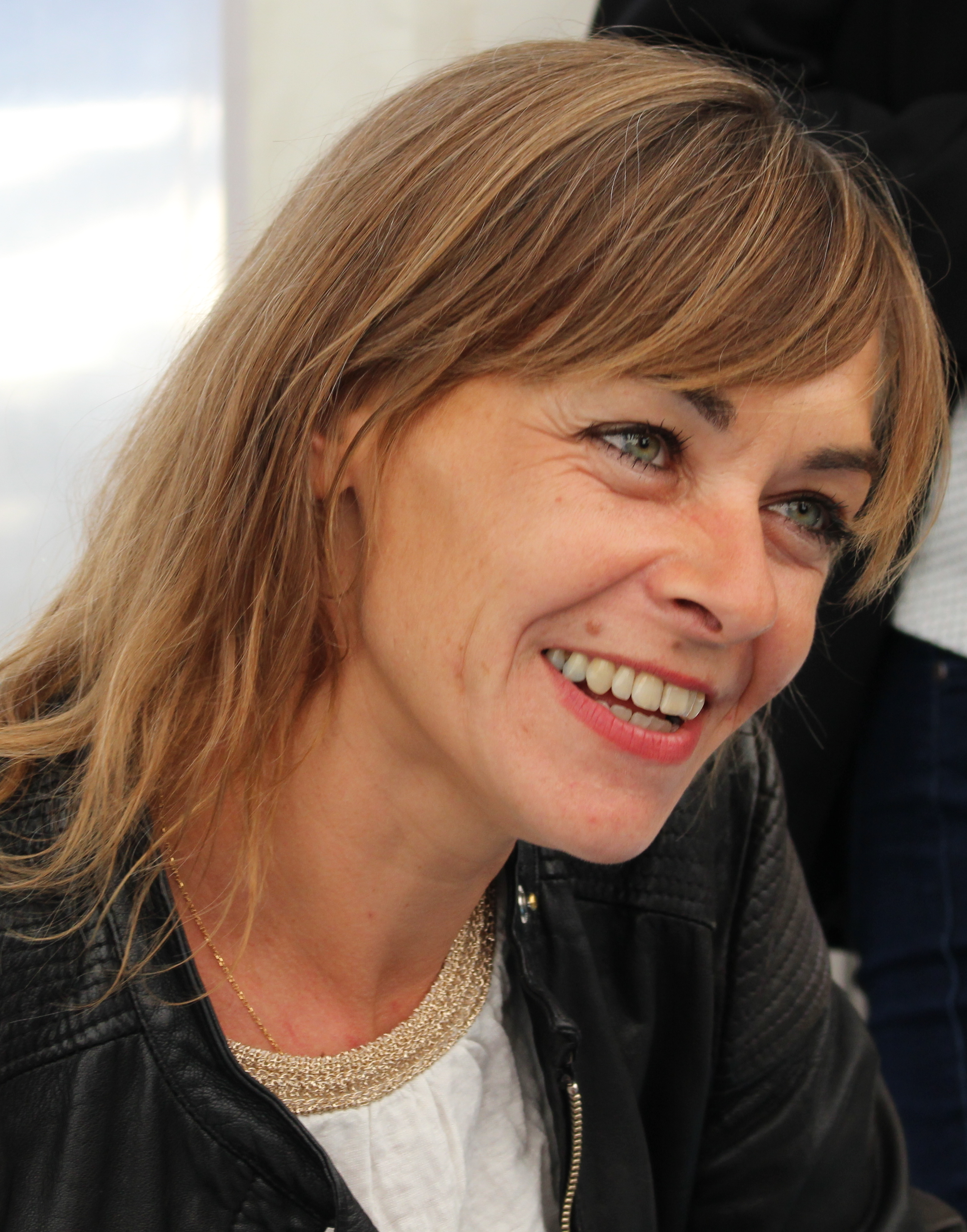
Agnès Martin-Lugand in 2018

Agnès Martin-Lugand (born 1979) is a French novelist who gained fame with Les gens heureux lisent et boivent du café (Happy People Read and Drink Coffee) when she published it on Kindle in December 2012. By 2017, her five novels had clocked up sales of two million worldwide.

== Biography ==
Born in Saint-Malo, Ille-et-Vilaine in 1979, Martin-Lugand studied psychology and spent six years working on child protection in hospitals. She then took up writing, completing Les gens heureux lisent et boivent du café. After it had been turned down by several publishers, she decided to publish a digital version herself. It became an immediate success on Amazon's Kindle. Noticing its popularity, the publisher Michel Lafon bought the rights and published a print edition in 2013 which sold 300,000 copies. Lafon has continued the novel's success by having it translated into 14 languages, including Portuguese, Lithuanian, Turkish and Chinese. There are now plans for the work to be filmed in Hollywood.

Martin-Lugand has continued to write, publishing Entre mes mains le bonheur se faufile (2014), La vie est facile, ne t'inquiète pas (2015), Désolée, je suis attendue (2016) and J'ai toujours cette musique dans la tête (2017). Her most recent work, A la lumière du petit matin was published in 2018.

== Publications in English ==
Two of Martin-Lugand's works have been published in English:

- 2016: Happy People Read and Drink Coffee
- 2017: Don't Worry, Life Is Easy

== Personal life ==
Martin-Lugand lives in Rouen with her husband and their two boys.
