= Agnes Finnie =

Scottish woman accused of witchcraft

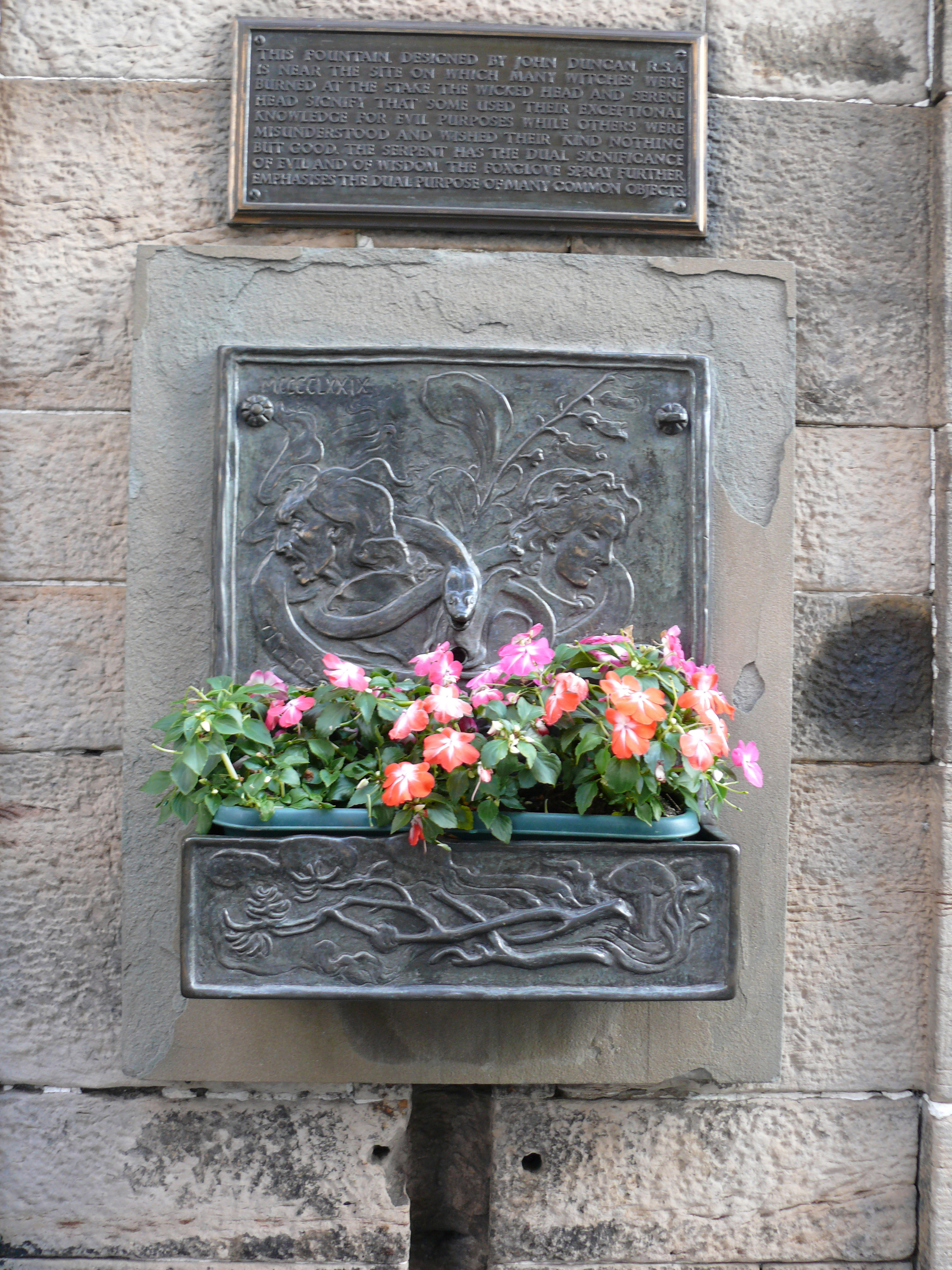
Witch's Well on the Royal Mile commemorates the 300 women executed in Edinburgh for witchcraft

Agnes Finnie (died 6 March 1645) was an Edinburgh shopkeeper and moneylender who was executed for witchcraft on 6 March 1645.

== Biography ==
Finnie, widow of James Robertsone, sold consumer goods, such as fish and cakes in Potterrow, Edinburgh. Finnie is documented as possessing a fiery temper and known for cursing people in the street.

In June 1644, Finnie was arrested on 20 counts of witchcraft and sorcery. While most accused witches were tried within days of their initial arrest, Finnie was held for several months in Old Tolbooth before the trial.

She was tried on 20 December 1644 and executed on the Castle Hill of Edinburgh on Thursday, 6 March 1645. It is estimated that Finnie was age 48 at the time of her death. During the trial, Finnie's daughter Margaret Robertsone was accused of being a witch but was never arrested.

== Posthumous petition for pardon ==
Finnie is among the thousands who were accused and convicted of witchcraft in Scotland, and whose names have been submitted to the Scottish Parliament for a posthumous pardon to the Scottish Parliament. As of February 2025, no pardon has been issued. In 2022, Nicola Sturgeon issued a formal apology for the 'historic injustice' on behalf of the Scottish Government to those accused of witchcraft between the 16th and 18th centuries.

== Art work ==
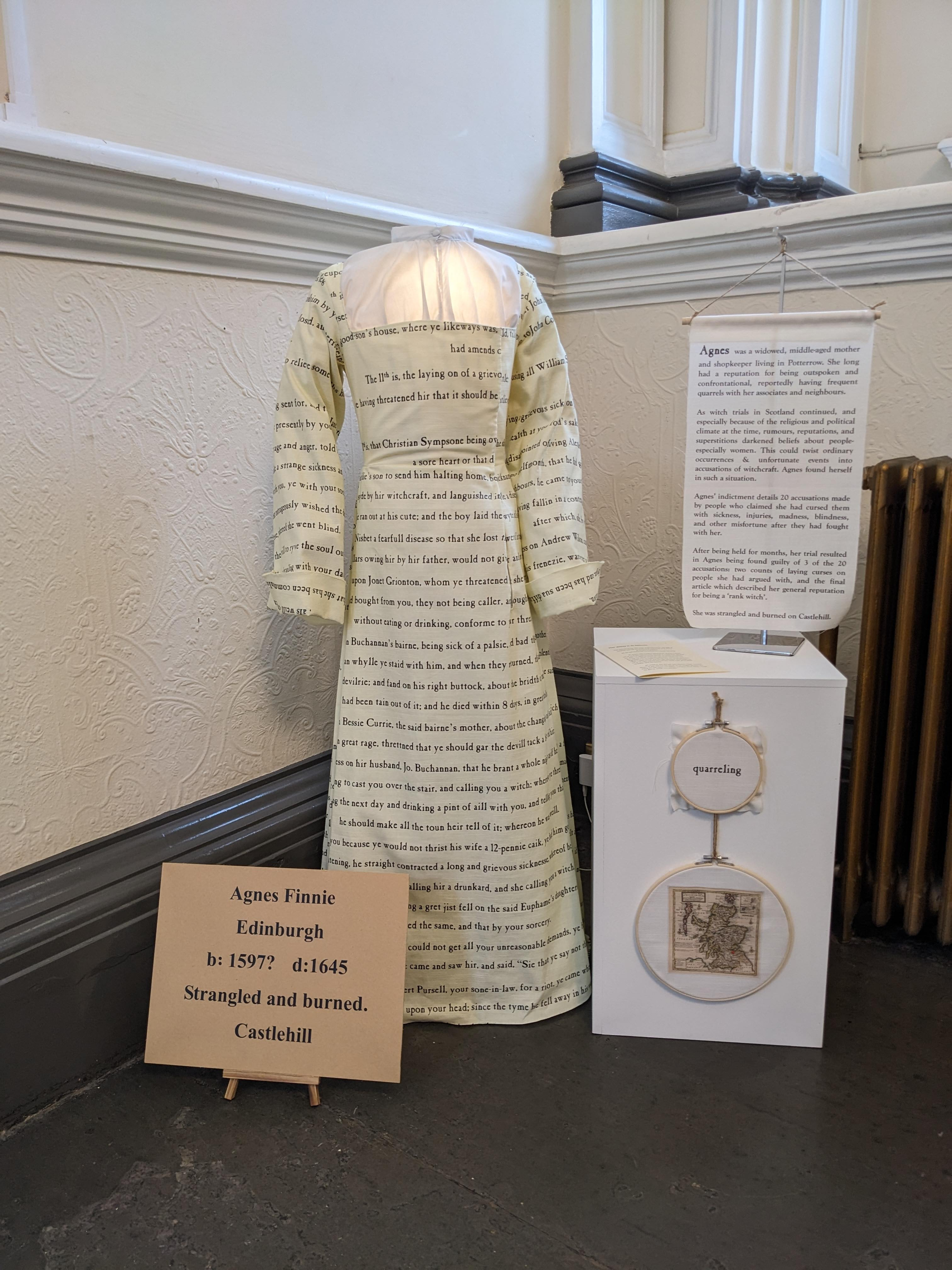
Agnes Finnie display in Witches in Word, Not Deed by Carolyn Sutton at Edinburgh Central Library

Agnes Finnie was one of thirteen accused witches who featured in an exhibition called Witches in Word, Not Deed by Carolyn Sutton, held at the Edinburgh Central Library and toured Scotland in 2023.
