= Agnes of Austria =

Agnes of Austria may also refer to:

- Agnes of Austria (1150s–1182), daughter of Henry II, Duke of Austria, married firstly Stephen III of Hungary, secondly to Herman II, Duke of Carinthia
- Agnes of Austria (1270–1322), daughter of Rudolf I of Germany, married Albert II, Duke of Saxony
- Agnes of Austria (1281–1364), daughter of Albert I of Germany, married Andrew III of Hungary
- Agnes of Austria (1322–1392), daughter of Leopold I, Duke of Austria, married Bolko II the Small
- Agnes of Babenberg (1108/13–1160/63), daughter of Leopold III, Margrave of Austria, married Władysław II the Exile
- Agnes of Habsburg (1257–1322), daughter of Rudolph I of Germany, married Albert II, Duke of Saxony
