= Ágnes Szilágyi =

Hungarian handball player (born 1990)

Personal information
- Full name: Ágnes Szilágyi
- Nationality: Hungarian
- Born: 7 March 1990 (age 36) Debrecen, Hungary
- Height: 1.60 m (5 ft 3 in)

Sport
- Sport: Handball
- Position: Left Wing

Youth career
- Years: Team
- 2005–2010: Debreceni VSC

Senior clubs
- Years: Team
- 2010–2016: Debreceni VSC
- loan: → Hajdúnánás SC
- 2016–2017: MTK Budapest

Ágnes Szilágyi (born 7 March 1990 in Debrecen) is a Hungarian handballer.

== Achievements ==
- Nemzeti Bajnokság I:
  - Silver Medallist: 2011
