= Agnes C. Higgins =

Canadian nutritionist

Agnes C. Higgins née Quamme (1911 - August 27, 1985) was a Canadian nutritionist and executive director of the Montreal Diet Dispensary, serving from 1959 to 1981. She is best known for developing the "Higgins Method" to help mothers with nutrition so their children would not be low birth-weight babies and they would then be more likely to grow up healthy. The USDA was influenced by Ms. Higgins and observed her work at the dispensary to create the WIC program. Prior to working at the Diet Dispensary she worked for Betty Crocker and was one of the women who responded to correspondence addressed to Miss Betty Crocker. Her name is listed among Typonym'Elles, the list of recognized females whose names are of historic importance and are available to the city of Montreal for use when naming new city attributes.

== Awards ==
- 1975 - Order of Canada
- 1975 - Honorary Degree from Concordia University.
- 1980 - The March of Dimes created the annual Higgins Award for maternal-fetal nutrition to award to nutritionists for their distinguished achievement in nutrition.
- 1985 - E.W. Crampton Award for Distinguished Service in fields dealing with Nutrition and Food from McGill University
