= Agnes Atim Apea =

Ugandan politician

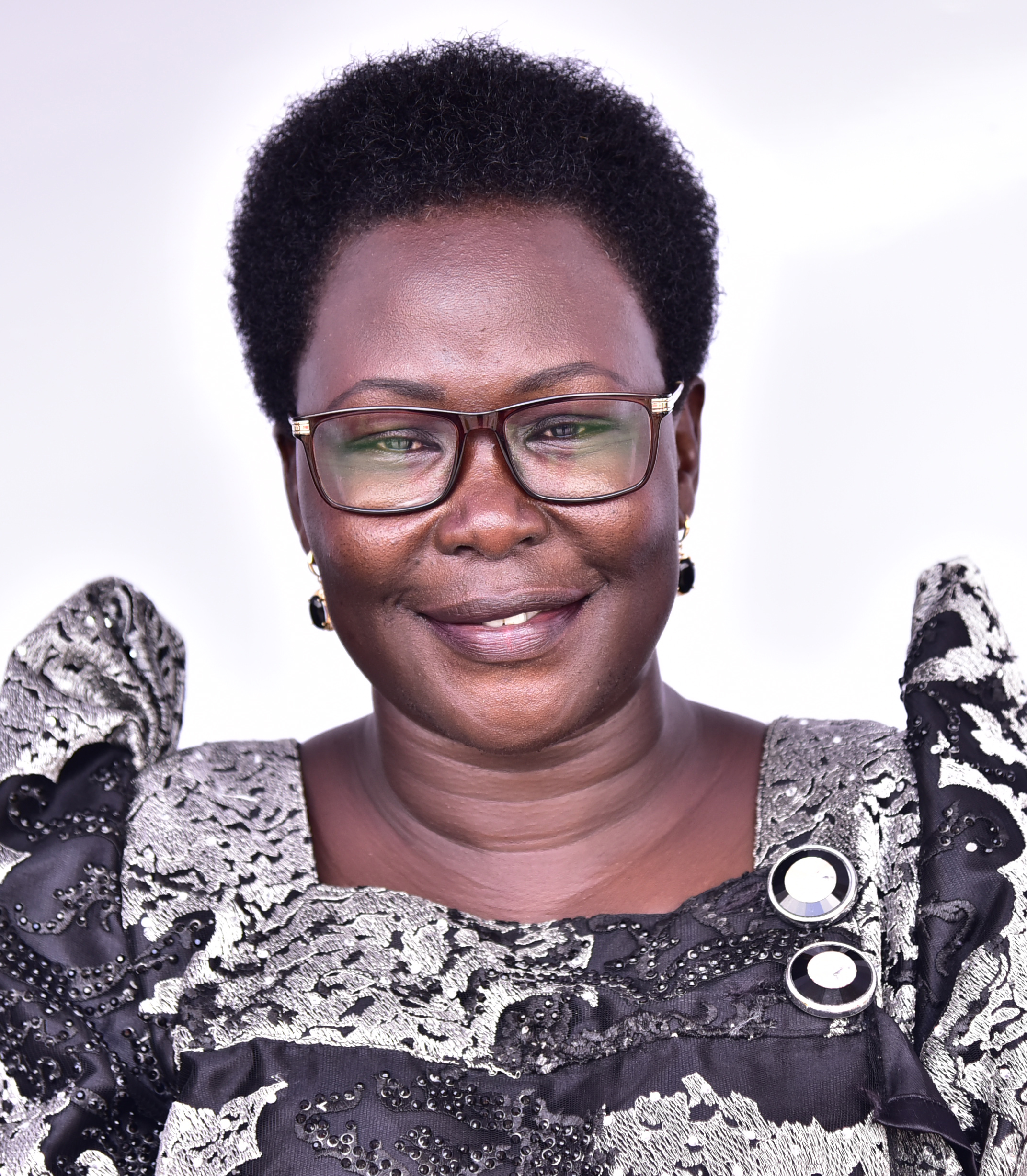
- Born: Uganda
- Other name: "Mama Rice"
- Education: University of Reading; Uganda Martyrs University
- Occupation: Social entrepreneur
- Known for: Founder of Hope Development Initiative
- Political party: National Resistance Movement

Agnes Atim Apea is a Ugandan social entrepreneur and politician. She founded the Hope Development Initiative, and was named to the BBC's 100 Women programme in 2017. In the 2021 general election, she was elected to the Parliament of Uganda as the women's representative in the Amolatar District for the National Resistance Movement.

== Education and career ==
Apea has a Doctor of Philosophy in International Development from the University of Reading, and a Master's degree from Uganda Martyrs University in Developmental Studies.

Apea is the chairperson of Local Government Finance Commission and also the founder and chief executive officer of Hope Development Initiative, which promotes the rice growing industry for female farmers in several areas of Uganda. This has led to her nickname of "Mama Rice". Her organization has arranged agricultural cooperatives in Uganda, and drive to achieve a significant portion of the market share. In addition to rice, the cooperatives also work with seeds used to make vegetable oil and cassava products.

She is also the women's representative of Parliament for the Amolatar District in Northern Uganda.

In 2017, she was named to the BBC's 100 Women programme. Apea found out while she was attending the 7th African Grain Trade Summit in Tanzania, saying that it was because she promoted social justice and teaching to young women that she made it on the list.

In the eleventh parliament of Uganda, she serves as the deputy chairperson of the Committee on Agriculture, Animal Industries & Fisheries.

== See also ==
- List of members of the eleventh Parliament of Uganda
