= Agnes Bushell =

American fiction writer and teacher

Agnes Bushell (born March 25, 1949) is an American fiction writer and teacher. She has published steadily since her work first appeared in print in the mid-1970s. She is the author of fourteen novels and innumerable essays and book reviews most of which have appeared in Maine newspapers and publications, including Down East Magazine. She has taught literature and writing at Maine College of Art, the San Francisco Art Institute, and the University of Southern Maine, and lives in Portland, Maine with her husband, James Bushell, a criminal defense lawyer.

== Life ==
Born Agnes Barr in St. Albans, Queens, New York, Bushell attended the University of Chicago from 1966 to 1968. She met James Bushell during the summer of 1967; they were married the following year. In 1971, the Bushells moved to Portland, Maine, where they have lived almost continuously ever since. They have two children, Jessie, born in 1972, and Nicolas, born in 1979.

In July 1972, Bushell and several other political activists began publishing a monthly political pamphlet called The Rag. The women involved in The Rag later formed Littoral Books and published Balancing Act, an anthology of Maine women's poetry. Several of Bushell's poems appeared in this anthology. In 1975, Littoral Books joined with other small presses in Maine to form Maine Writers and Publishers Alliance.

During this period, the Bushells were actively engaged in the countercultural movement in Portland. Two of their close friends went underground during this period. Ten years later, these friends and five others, known after their capture by the FBI as the Ohio 7, were put on trial for bombings, bank robbery and sedition. These events were the inspiration for Bushell's second novel Local Deities, published in 1990. Hailed by the book reviewer for The Nation as a potboiler like the best of Dostoyevsky's, it is Bushell's most successful book to date, a roman à clef based on her friendship with "two of Maine's most notorious radicals". The author herself identifies the origin of the novel as a desire to remember and transmit the nearly forgotten history of the 1970s, what she calls a "consciously forgotten period."

During the decade of the '80's, Bushell became involved in local political activism. She was one of the parent-organizers of the alternative public school, Many Rivers. She was also a member of the Pledge of Resistance against U. S. intervention in Central America, and was arrested twice during sit-ins in Portland protesting military aid to the Contras. She visited Nicaragua for the first time with a group of writers and poets accompanying Allen Ginsberg to the 1986 Ruben Dario Festival. Subsequent trips to Nicaragua inspired the novel Days of the Dead, a spine-tingling, high-tension, deviant political thriller, in which Bushell "violates the conventions of the genre and plots homosexuality into the revolutionary insurgencies in Central America."

By the '90's Bushell's work was finding publishers among independent presses and it was during this time that she published her three gay-themed mysteries, two set in Portland and one in San Francisco. She also co-founded the Maine political journal The Dissident, and became its primary book reviewer. But by the beginning of the next decade many small presses had gone out of business, and Bushell began publishing her work privately in small numbered editions. These included a quartet of novels set in the United States, Greece and Turkey.

In 2018, Bushell, her husband, James Bushell, and Littoral Books co-founder Marcia Ridge Brown revived Littoral Books as a Maine-based independent literary press dedicated to publishing the work of Maine writers and artists. Anthologies Bushell edited for Littoral Books were honored by being finalists for or receiving Maine Literary Awards in 2019, 2021, and 2022. In 2016 she received a Maine Literary Distinguished Achievement Award for "exceptional and steadfast contributions to the Maine literary arts."

Littoral Books published three of Bushell's novels – The House on Perry Street, The Oracle Pool, and Monkey – to favorable reviews. She has been described by National Critics Circle's Dana Wilde as "the most skillful prose stylist now writing in Maine."

== Bibliography ==
=== Published novels ===
- Shadowdance: A Woman Sleuth Mystery, Crossing Press, Freedom, California, 1989 ISBN 0-89594-346-8
  - Danish edition: Skygge dans, Modtryk, 1990.
  - German edition: Tanz der Schatten, Argument Verlag, 1995.
- Local Deities, Curbstone Press, Willimantic, Connecticut, 1990 ISBN 0-915306-82-4
- Death by Crystal: A Johannah Wilder Mystery, Astarte Shell Press, Portland, Maine, 1993. ISBN 0-9624626-5-9
  - German edition: Der Fall mit dem Kristall, Argument Verlag, 1997.
- Days of the Dead, John Brown Books, Salem, Oregon, 1995. ISBN 0-9639050-8-2
- The Enumerator, Serpent's Tail Press, London and New York, 1997. ISBN 1-85242-554-7
- Mothers and Sons, limited edition privately published in collaboration with Brynmorgen Press, Portland, Maine, 2004.
- Asian Vespers, limited edition privately published in collaboration with Brynmorgen Press, Portland, Maine, 2005.
- After Mistra, limited edition privately published in collaboration with Brynmorgen Press, Portland, Maine, 2005.
- Fabrice in Flight, Lulu Communications, 2010. ISBN 978-0-557-36936-2
- Death in Arcadia, Lulu Communications, 2011. ISBN 978-1-257-91489-0
- The House on Perry Street, Littoral Books, Portland, Maine, 2018. ISBN 978-1-7357397-1-7
- The Oracle Pool, Littoral Books, Portland, Maine, 2020. ISBN 978-1-7357397-1-7
- Monkey, Littoral Books, Portland, Maine, 2022. ISBN 978-1-7357397-6-2

=== Short Stories in Anthologies ===
- A Few Simple Ordinary Things, in Looking for Mr. Preston, Richard Kasak Books, New York, 1995.
- Abenddamerung, in Coming Out Lesebuch, Argument Verlag, Hamburg, 1999.

=== Poetry in Anthologies ===
- "Conception" and "Love Song in Time" in Balancing Act, A Book of Poems by Ten Maine Women, Littoral Books, Portland, Maine, 1975.
