= Agnes Thomas Morris =

American writer and clubwoman (1865–1949)

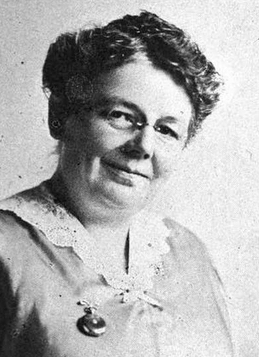
Agnes Thomas Morris, from a 1919 publication.

Agnes L. Thomas Morris (March 8, 1865 – June 25, 1949), known professionally as Mrs. Robert Carlton Morris, was an American writer and clubwoman, the national president of the War Mothers of America in 1918. As president of the Ohio Shakespeare Association, she lectured and wrote about William Shakespeare.

== Early life ==
Agnes L. Thomas was born in London, Ohio, the daughter of the John Morgan Thomas and Sara Phillips James Thomas. Both parents were born in Wales. Her father was a Congregationalist pastor who had served churches in Pennsylvania before accepting a position in Alliance, Ohio. She was educated at Mount Union College, graduating in the class of 1887, with further training at the National School of Oratory in Philadelphia. Agnes L. Thomas was partly deaf from childhood, with enough hearing loss that she was barred from teacher training programs.

== Career ==
Agnes Thomas Morris served on the board of the Toledo Woman's Association, on the Committee on Literature of the Ohio Federation of Women's Clubs, and In 1918, she was elected president of the War Mothers of America, and of the umbrella organization the Service Star Legion, at their national conference in Evansville, Indiana. After completing her term as national president, she served as associate editor of the organization's magazine, The Service Star.

Morris was president of the Ohio Shakespeare Association, and a vice president of the Shakespeare Association of America. She wrote a textbook, Every Day with Shakespeare. She was a columnist and contributing editor of the Shakespeare Association Bulletin, a national publication. She also wrote several one-act plays, including Under the Blossom (1935), Friendly Will Revisits Stratford (1935) and William Shakespeare Discovers New Worlds (1935).

== Personal life ==
Agnes L. Thomas married Robert Carlton Morris in 1891. They had two children, Vivian Anna Morris (1892–1918) and Robert Thomas Morris (1895–1972). Her son Robert fought in France during World War I. She was widowed when Robert Carlton Morris died in 1942, and she died in 1949, aged 84 years, in Toledo.
