= Ágnes Miskó =

Hungarian gymnast

Personal information
- Nationality: Hungarian
- Born: 1 October 1971 (age 53); Budapest, Hungary

Sport
- Sport: Gymnastics

Ágnes Miskó (born 1 October 1971) is a Hungarian gymnast. She competed in six events at the 1988 Summer Olympics.
