= Agnes Marion Moodie =

Scottish chemist

- Born: 6 October 1881; Arbroath, Scotland
- Died: 1969 (aged 87–88); Hove, England
- Education: University of St Andrews
- Known for: research on alkylated sugars with James Irvine first female chemistry graduate of the University of St Andrews
- Awards: Berry Scholarship in Science, Carnegie Scholar
- Scientific career
- Fields: Chemistry
- Workplaces: University of St Andrews

Agnes Marion Moodie (6 October 1881 – 1969) was a Scottish chemist and the first female chemistry graduate from the University of St Andrews.

== Early life ==
Agnes Marion Moodie was born in Arbroath on 6 October 1881, one of at least two children born to Robert Moodie, a founder of the Edinburgh Mathematical Society, who taught mathematics and physical science at Arbroath High School, and Mary Lithgow Mackintosh, daughter of Donald Mackintosh, a schoolmaster from Shotts, Lanarkshire. Moodie had a younger brother William Moodie born on 15 March 1886.

== Academic career ==
Moodie and her brother studied at the University of St Andrews where she was the first female student of chemistry. Moodie gained an MA in 1902, a BSc in 1903, and graduated in 1904 with first class honours in Mathematics and Natural Philosophy. After graduating, she remained at the University of St Andrews, where she undertook research with James Irvine. Moodie and Irvine co-authored a number of papers on alkylated sugars between 1905 and 1908. In 1905 Moodie was awarded a Berry Scholarship in Science, and in 1907 she received a Carnegie Scholarship. Moodie also campaigned for women to be admitted as fellows of the Royal Society of Chemistry.

== Later life ==
After leaving the University of St Andrews, Moodie worked for the Ministry of Education until her retirement in 1946. Following her retirement, Moodie took up residence in Hove, where she remained until her death in 1969.
