= Agnes Bell Collier =

British mathematician (1860–1930)

- Agnes Bell Collier while a student at Cambridge, a photograph taken in 1881 by G. Higginson of The Polygon Studio, Bowdon, Cheshire.
- Born: 31 January 1860; Hyde, Cheshire, England
- Died: 2 January 1930 (aged 69)
- Occupation: British mathematician

Agnes Bell Collier (31 January 1860 – 2 January 1930) was a British mathematician who was a pioneer female mathematician, associated with Newnham College, Cambridge.

Collier was born in Hyde, Cheshire. She was educated at Ellerslie Ladies' College, Manchester and Newnham College, Cambridge from 1880 to 1883, passing the Mathematical Tripos in 1883. She was College Lecturer in Mathematics from 1883 to 1925 and Director of Studies 1883–1920. She was College Vice-Principal 1920–25, and a College Associate from 1893 to 1917.
