= Agnes Terei =

Vanuatuan educator and politician

Member of the Advisory Council
- In office 1965–1969

Agnes Terei was a Vanuatuan educator and politician. In 1965 she became the first woman appointed to the Advisory Council of the New Hebrides.

== Biography ==
From Beleru in Espiritu Santo, Terei worked as an assistant teacher at the Sainte Therese mission school in Espiritu Santo. In December 1965 she was appointed to the Advisory Council, becoming its first female member.
