= Agnes Sam =

South African writer (born 1942)

- Born: 1942 (age 83–84); Port Elizabeth, South Africa
- Education: National University of Lesotho
- Occupation: Writer

Agnes Sam (born 1942) is a South African writer.

== Life ==
As a child of nine, Agnes Sam's great-grandfather had been "shanghaied" into indentureship and brought to Durban, South Africa, in 1860 on the Lord George Bentinck II. Sam was thus born into an Indian family in Port Elizabeth, and grew up there, near the family business. She was educated at a Roman Catholic school in Port Elizabeth. There the Indian experience was never mentioned in history lessons:

how and why the largest group of Indians outside the subcontinent came to be in South Africa was never accounted for [...] South African Indians like myself have lost mother tongue, family name, religion, culture, history, and historica links with India. Cut off from India, apartheid has further separated us from other communities in South Africa, thereby exascerbating our isolation.

Sam went on to study Zoology and Psychology at the National University of Lesotho, and trained as a teacher in Zimbabwe. After briefly teaching science in Zambia, she went into exile in 1973 in England, bringing up three children there while also attempting to take a further degree.

Most of the stories in Sam's 1989 debut collection, Jesus is Indian, are set in Port Elizabeth. She returned to South Africa in 1993.

Her debut novel, The Pragashini–Smuts Affair, was published in 2009, and was described as "a powerful account of politics, segregation and love across the racial divide". Its sequel in 2014 was The Pragashini–Smuts Conspiracy.

== Works ==
- "South Africa: Guest of Honour Amongst the Uninvited Newcomers to England's Great Tradition". Kunapipi, Vol. 7, No. 2 (1985), pp. 92–96.
- Jesus Is Indian and Other Stories. England: Women's Press, 1989.
- The Pragashini–Smuts Affair. York: Paloma Books, 2009.
- The Pragashini–Smuts Conspiracy. York: Paloma Books, 2014.
- Dora: a screenplay. York: Paloma Books, 2014.
