= Agnes Berger =

Hungarian-American mathematician

Agnes P. Berger (1916-2002) was a Hungarian-American mathematician who served as an associate professor of biostatistics at Columbia University's School of Public Health, as well as a statistical consultant at Mount Sinai.

== Early years ==
Her first experiences with mathematics were thanks to the Hungarian publication Kömal (Kozepiskolai Matematikai Lapok), a monthly magazine for high school students that included math problems.

During her studies at the University of Budapest, she was a student of the prominent Hungarian mathematician Lipót Fejér, whom she would remember years later for his short, detailed classes and dramatic endings. Her parents were friends with the parents of contemporary mathematician Peter Lax.

She earned her doctorate.

== Career ==
Berger collaborated with other statisticians such at Jerzy Neyman. She reviewed work of Joseph L. Fleiss, another statistical mathematician.

== Family life and last years of life ==
Agnes Berger married Laszlo Berger, with whom she had a son, John Joseph Berger. She died at age 85 at Lenox Hill Hospital on March 27, 2002.

== Some publications ==
- With Abraham Wald, On Distinct Hypotheses. The Annals of Mathematical Statistics (1949), Volume 20, Number 1.
- On Uniformly Consistent Tests. The Annals of Mathematical Statistics, Volume 22 (1951), Number 2.
- Remark on Separable Spaces of Probability Measures. The Annals of Mathematical Statistics (1951), Volume 22, Number 1.
- On orthogonal probability measures. Proceedings of the American Mathematical Society (1953), Volume 4, Number 5.
- On Comparing Intensities of Association between Two Binary Characteristics in Two Different Populations. Journal of the American Statistical Association (1961), Volume 56, Number 296.
- With Ruth Z. Gold, On Comparing Survival Times. Proceedings of the Fourth Berkeley Symposium on Mathematical Statistics and Probability, Volume 4: Contributions to Biology and Problems of Medicine (1961), Number 67.
- On comparing survival probabilities from discrete observations under unequal censoring. Statistics & Probability Letters (1983), Volume 1, Number 5.
- With Ora E. Percus, On sampling by index cases. Statistics & Probability Letters (1985), Volume 3, Number 4.
- With Guadalupe Gómez and Sylvan Wallenstein, A Homogeneity Test for Follow-up Studies. Mathematical Medicine and Biology (1988), Volume 5, Number 2.
