= Agnes Aanonsen =

Norwegian luger (born 1966)

Personal information
- Born: 19 November 1966 (age 58); Oslo, Norway

Sport
- Sport: Luge

Agnes Erika Aanonsen Eyde (born 19 November 1966) is a Norwegian luger. She was born in Oslo, and represented the club Akeforeningen i Oslo. She competed at the 1984 Winter Olympics in Sarajevo, where she crashed and completed 23rd in singles.
