= Agnes Clara Tatham =

English painter

- Born: 18 January 1893
- Died: 13 September 1972 (aged 79)
- Other name: ´Widdy´ (nickname)
- Education: Byam Shaw School of Art, Vicat Cole School of Art, Royal Academy Schools
- Occupation: painter
- Known for: mostly in oil and tempera, illustrator on several children's books
- Notable work: opened the Unique School for Children’s Art in London
- Parents: Meaburn Talbot Tatham (father); Susan Clara Miers (mother)

Agnes Clara Tatham (18 January 1893 – 13 September 1972) was an English painter. Several of her works are well known in art circles and have changed hands at the most prestigious auction houses.

== Life ==
Tatham was born on 18 January 1893 as the fourth out of five children; her parents were Meaburn Talbot Tatham and Susan Clara Miers. She spent her childhood at Northcourt House, Abingdon, England. Her family nickname was 'Widdy'. For a period in March 1901, she lived in the house of her mother's family, Eden Cottage, Beckenham, London.

Agnes studied art at the Byam Shaw School of Art. There, she developed a friendship with Eleanor Fortescue Brickdale (1872–1945), who was a watercolour teacher at the school, with annual commercial exhibitions and works in the illustrated press, identifying as a third-wave pre-Raphaelite.

Agnes also studied at the Vicat Cole School of Art and, from 1915 to 1921, was a student at the Royal Academy Schools, where she received a number of artistic awards and recognitions for her paintings. Her works were mostly in oil and tempera, and her paintings have been widely exhibited. She also worked as an illustrator on several children's books.

About 1950, she moved to Kensington, where she lived until 1970. With Elsie Gledstanes and Alice Burton, she opened a new art school called the Unique School for Children's Art in London. She moved back to Nourthcourt House in 1970 and lived there until her death on 13 September 1972, aged 79. She was buried on 28 October 1972.
