= Agnes Mizere =

Malawian journalist, blogger, story-teller and TV personality

- Born: Agnes Mizere; Malawi
- Occupation: Retired Journalist

Agnes Mizere is a retired Malawian TV personality, journalist, storyteller and blogger. She was a journalist in Malawi for over twenty years and is one of the pioneers of TV Malawi when it first launched in 1999. She is best known for covering issues about Malawian traditional cultures and women, children and Youth. She used to work as a talk show host on Zambezi Magic's “Grapevine” talk show where she covered topical issues in Malawi such as gender, culture and HIV/AIDS. She also did freelance work and mentored journalists in Malawi.

== Awards ==
- Media Institute of Southern Africa Malawi's Annual Media Awards, “Best blogger" 2015
