= Agnes Rossi =

American fiction writer (born 1959)

- Born: August 11, 1959 (age 67); Paterson, New Jersey, U.S.
- Education: Rutgers University; New York University
- Writing career
- Notable works: Athletes and Artists

Agnes Rossi (born August 11, 1959) is an American fiction writer.

== Biography ==
Rossi was born in Paterson, New Jersey, in 1959 to an Irish-American mother and an Italian-American father. She earned a bachelor's degree at Rutgers University and an M. A. degree in English from New York University. Her first book, a collection of short stories titled Athletes and Artists, won the New York University Prize for Fiction in 1987. In her 1992 collection, The Quick: A Novella and Stories, characters search for human connection to escape from the anonymity and solitude to which they seem doomed.

In her novella, The Quick, she explores Italian-American themes, albeit evasively, according to one reviewer. Another writes, "For Agnes Rossi, the Italian American background is attenuated into accents of detail and character." The protagonist in The Quick rises to the middle class by way of marriage, only to sink back into the economic instability of the working class she came from. Her first full-length novel, Split Skirt (1994), explores the relationship between two women who, despite differences in age, social class, and ethnicity, develop a friendship while incarcerated for three days in the Hackensack county jail. The Houseguest (1999), is set in 1934, and the protagonist is Irish.

Rossi's work has been well received, particularly The Quick. Edvidge Giunta writes, "Rossi's concern with investigating ethnic intersections, her rejection of simplistic notions of ethnic identity, and her exploration of narrative strategies make her one of today's significant contemporary Italian American authors."

== Works ==
- Athletes and Artists: Stories New York : New York University Press, 1987. ISBN 9780892551156, OCLC 15223640
- The Quick: A Novella and Stories New York: Norton, 1992. ISBN 9780393314700, OCLC 35329797
- Split Skirt New York: Random House, 1994. ISBN 9780679425434, OCLC 28506673
- The Houseguest: A Novel New York, N.Y. : Plume, 1999. ISBN 9780452281974, OCLC 45265847
