= Ágnes Torma =

Hungarian volleyball player (born 1951)

Personal information
- Nationality: Hungarian
- Born: 5 August 1951 (age 74) Budapest, Hungary

Sport
- Sport: Volleyball

Ágnes Torma (born 5 August 1951) is a Hungarian volleyball player. She competed at the 1972 Summer Olympics, the 1976 Summer Olympics and the 1980 Summer Olympics.
