= Agnes of Aquitaine =

Agnes of Aquitaine may refer to:

- Agnes of Burgundy, Duchess of Aquitaine, (c. 995–1068), wife of William V, Duke of Aquitaine
- Agnes of Poitou, (c. 1025–1077), wife of Henry III, Holy Roman Emperor
- Agnes of Aquitaine, Queen of León and Castile, (died c. 1078), wife of Alfonso VI of Castile
- Agnes of Aquitaine, Countess of Savoy, (died c. 1097), wife of Peter I of Savoy
- Agnes of Aquitaine, Queen of Aragon and Navarre, (1072–1097), wife of King Peter I of Aragon and Navarre
- Agnes of Aquitaine, wife of Ramiro II of Aragon, (c. 1105–c. 1159) wife of Aimery V of Thours and Ramiro II of Aragon

== See also ==
- Agnes, wife of Ramiro I of Aragon, (fl. 1054–1062), perhaps of Aquitaine, perhaps identical to the Countess of Savoy
