= Ágnes Gajdos-Hubai =

Hungarian volleyball player (1948–2014)

Personal information
- Nationality: Hungarian
- Born: 13 May 1948; Budapest, Hungary
- Died: 14 June 2014 (aged 66)

Sport
- Sport: Volleyball

Ágnes Gajdos-Hubai (13 May 1948 – 14 June 2014) was a Hungarian volleyball player. She competed in the women's tournament at the 1976 Summer Olympics.
