= Agnes Gehrman =

American politician

Member of the Washington Senate from the 19th district
- In office 1941–1945

Member of the Washington House of Representatives from the 32nd district
- In office 1947–1949

Personal details
- Born: April 24, 1893 Iowa
- Died: August 1, 1982 (aged 89) Foresthill, California
- Party: Republican

Agnes M. Gehrman (April 24, 1893 – August 1, 1982) was an American politician. She was a Republican and represented Pacific County in the Washington House of Representatives and the Washington State Senate. Gehrman chaired the Commerce and Manufacturing Committee, an unusual accomplishment for a woman at the time.
