= Agnes von Konow =

Finnish animal rights activist

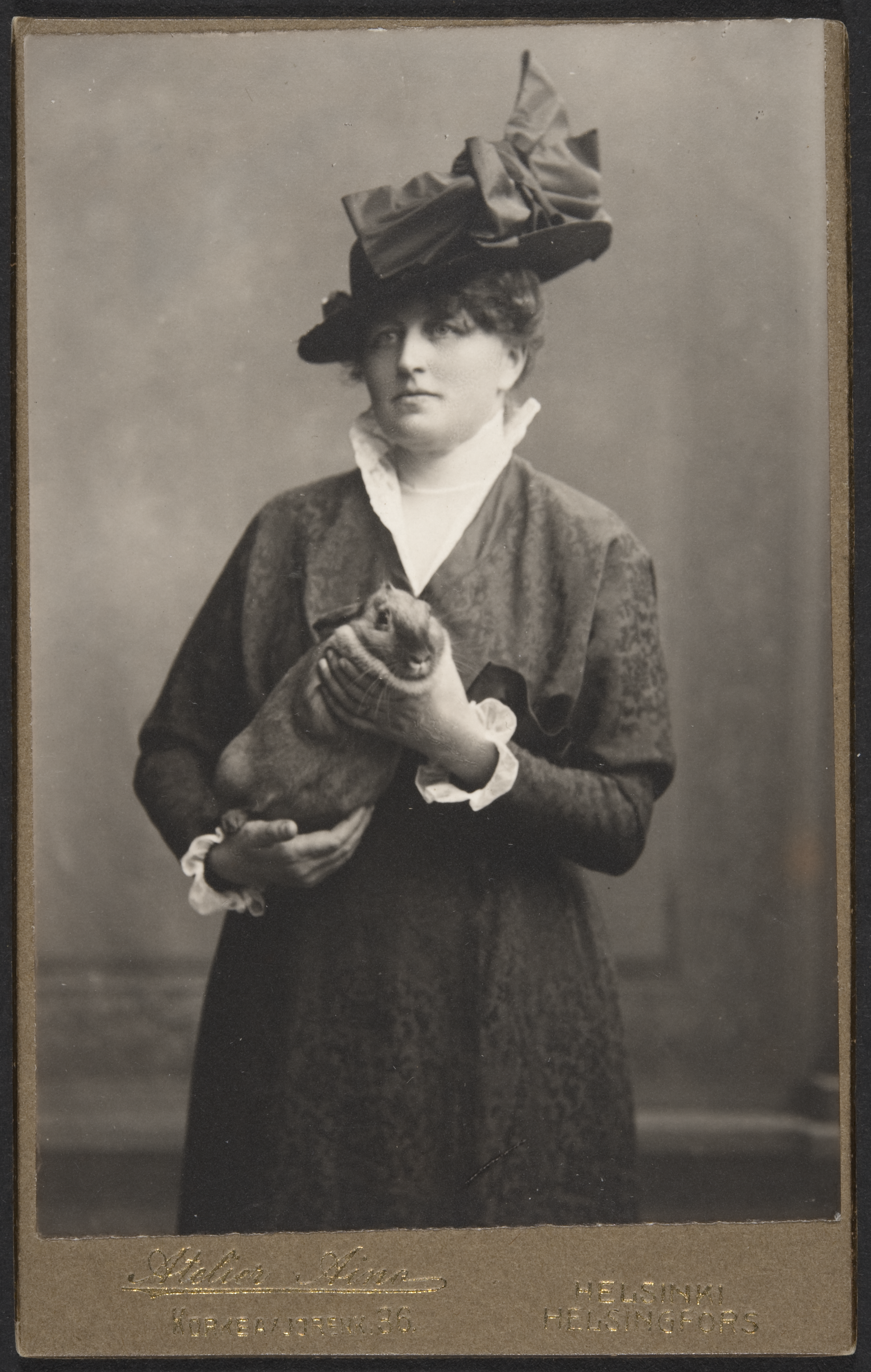
Agnes von Konow

Agnes von Konow (5 March 1868 – 15 May 1944), was a Finnish activist for the protection of animals. She was the founder of the Finnish society for the protection of animals, SEY Suomen Eläinsuojeluyhdistysten liitto, and a pioneer within the animal protection movement in Finland.

== Life ==
Agnes von Konow was born to the official noble Oskar Wilhelm von Konow and Amalia Sofia Malmström. She studied at the Svenska fruntimmersskolan i Helsingfors and the Jyväskylä seminary and became a school teacher in Helsinki in 1895. In 1901, she founded the SEY Suomen Eläinsuojeluyhdistysten liitto; in 1918-23 she served in the Suomen Punaisen Tähden and in 1918-24 in the Suomen Yhtyneiden; she was the secretary of the Sylvia-yhdistyksen from 1909, and from 1928 to her death chairperson of the Animal Protection Society.
