= Agnes Baliques =

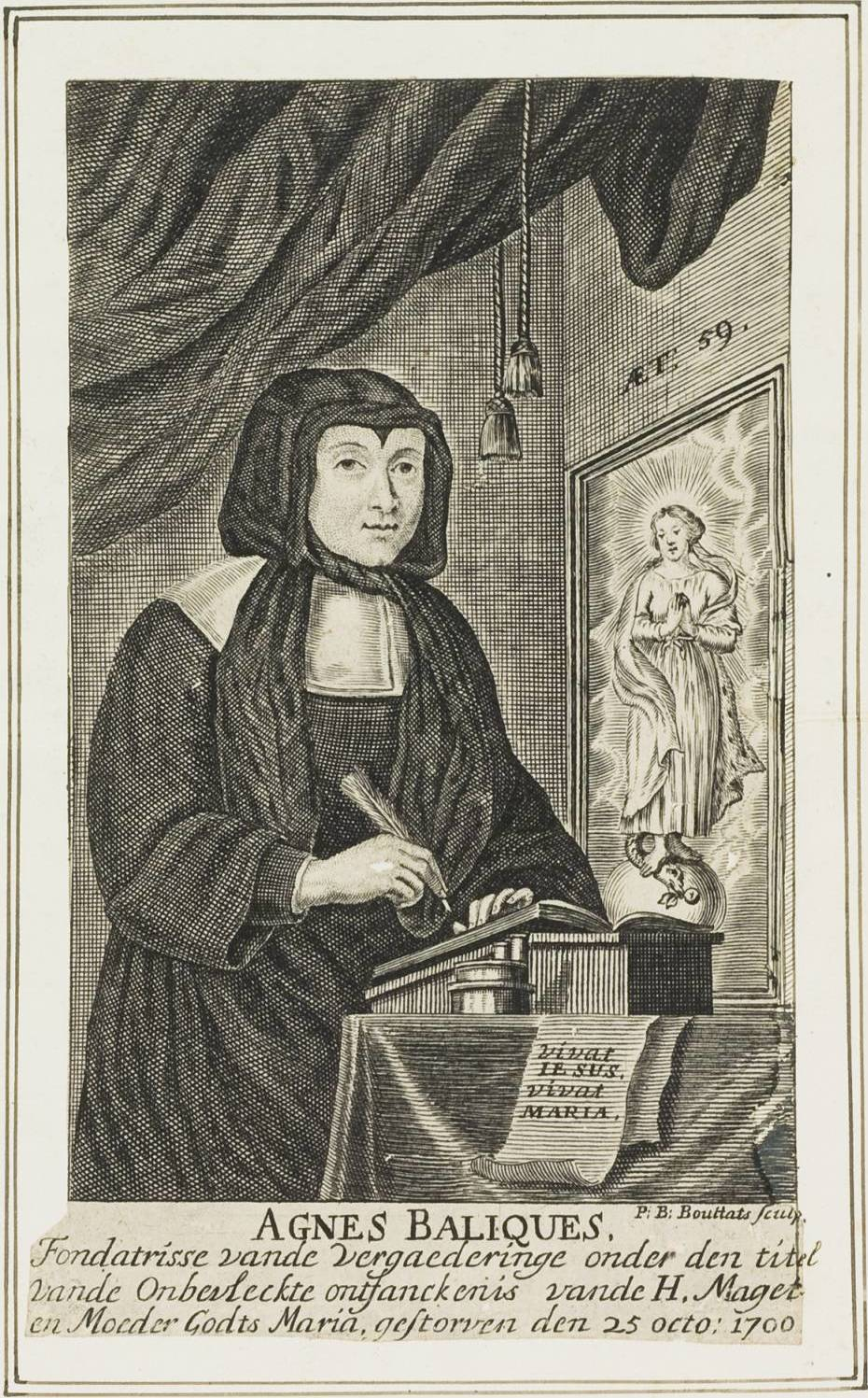
- Agnes Baliques at age 59 by Pieter Balthazar Bouttats
- Born: 1641; Antwerp
- Died: 15 October 1700 (aged 58–59); Mechelen

Agnes Baliques (1641–1700) was a Roman Catholic from Antwerp who founded the religious order of the Daughters of Our Lady of the Immaculate Conception, commonly known as the Apostolines.

== Life ==
Born in Antwerp in 1641 to a family of Spanish ancestry, Baliques was from a young age attracted to a life of religious devotion and penitence. Wishing to share her religious convictions with like-minded women, she founded the congregation of the Dochters van de onbevlekte ontvangenis der Allerheilige Maagd en Moeder Gods Maria (Daughters of the Immaculate Conception of Mary, Most Blessed Virgin and Mother of God) in Antwerp in 1682. She was supported in her endeavour by her confessor, the Friar Minor Henricus van Geldorp, and by the local bishop. She had rented a house behind the Minderbroederstraat in Antwerp for the congregation. In a short period of time she was joined there by fifteen women. In 1682 a woman gave the congregation the free use of a house behind St. James' Church, Antwerp, to which they then moved. The group grew until 1689, when a dispute arose because some sisters wanted to live by a stricter rule. Baliques then moved with the sisters that supported her to a house that she had acquired on the Paardemarkt, leaving behind the sisters who wanted the stricter rule. She later acquired two more houses to accommodate the growing congregation.

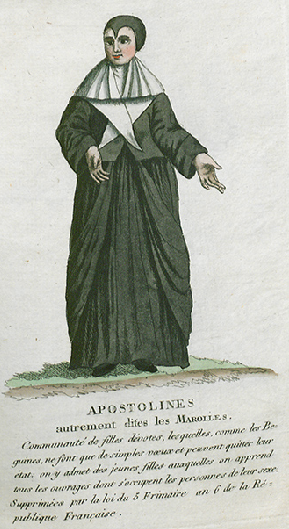
Illustration of the habit of the Apostolines by Philippe Joseph Maillart and Jeanne Catherine Maillart (1811)

The motto of the congregation was pati et mori (suffer and die). Its principal object was the education of the poor, and of other classes of society, caring for the sick and the poor, and operating homes for the aged and orphanages. The basis of its rule is the Rule of Saint Augustine. Members of the congregation wore a very simple habit.

The congregation soon set up houses in Antwerp, Brussels, Mechelen and Oudenaarde, where they provided education for poor girls and former prostitutes, with a particular focus on needlework and lace-making. The sisters were traditionally believed to have given their name to the working-class neighborhood of the Marolles in Brussels. In reality, this is because the congregation was confused with a similar organisation called the Congregation of the Maricolen Sisters, popularly called "Marolles" or "Marullen," which never operated in Brussels. The name Maricolen is derived from the Latin "Maria colentes" (protecting Virgin). Both orders were dedicated to the Virgin Mary, hence perhaps the confusion. The house in the Marolles only existed from 1691 to 1715, if at all.

Baliques died in her congregation's house in Mechelen on 15 October 1700.

== The congregation's rule ==
The congregation's rule of life as revised by Thomas Philip, Cardinal Archbishop of Mechelen was published in Mechelen in 1736 in two volumes under the title Den Godvruchtigen Regel van de geestelycke dochters der vergaederinghe van de onbevleckte ontfangenisse van de H. M. ende Moeder Godts Maria, genoemt Apostelinnen. This publication also contains a brief (auto)biography of Agnes Baliques entitled Kort begryp van het leven der jouffrouw Agnes Baliques (Brief summary of the life of Miss Agnes Baliques).
