= Agnes Quisumbing =

Economist and researcher

Agnes Quisambing
- Occupations: Economist, Professor

Academic background
- Education: De La Salle University (AB) University of the Philippines (MA, PhD)

Academic work
- School or tradition: International Economics; Agricultural Economics; Econometrics

Agnes Quisumbing is an economist and a senior research fellow at the International Food Policy Research Institute. She holds a PhD from the University of the Philippines (including a year at the Massachusetts Institute of Technology) and a bachelor's degree from De La Salle University.

== Career and policy work ==
Quisumbing started her career at the University of the Philippines. From 1988 to 1991 she was at the Economic Growth Center at Yale University winning a Rockefeller Foundation Postdoctoral Fellowship. She then joined the World Bank where she worked at the Population and Human Resources Division from 1991 to 1995. Since 1995, she is a research fellow at the International Food Policy Research Institute.

== Research ==
Quisumbing's research focuses on intrahousehold allocation, gender and poverty. Her most quoted paper focuses on marriage and intrahousehold allocation in Bangladesh, Ethiopia, Indonesia and South Africa. With Sabina Alkire, Ruth Meinzen-Dick, Amber Peterman, Greg Seymour and Ana Vaz, she also compiled a women's empowerment in agriculture index which measures the "empowerment, agency, and inclusion of women in the agricultural sector". Her works has been quoted over 36000 times and she is among the 120 most quoted women economists in the world. Her research has been quoted in the Washington Post, Slate and other media.
