= Agnes Lange =

German politician (1929–2021)

Member of the Bürgerschaft of Bremen
- In office 1984–1991

Personal details
- Born: 7 August 1929 Bremen, Germany
- Died: 16 February 2021 (aged 91) Bremen, Germany
- Party: SPD
- Occupation: Politician

Agnes Lange (7 August 1929 – 16 February 2021) was a German politician who served in the Bürgerschaft of Bremen.

== Biography ==
Lange was a member of the Social Democratic Party of Germany and served in various positions within the party. She was a member of the Bürgerschaft of Bremen from 1984 to 1991 and was very active in business, foreign trade, construction, and urban development. She was also involved in the Arbeiterwohlfahrt.

Agnes Lange died in Bremen on 16 February 2021 at the age of 91.
