= Agnes Ndirubusa =

African women journalist

- Born: Burundi
- Citizenship: Burundi
- Occupation: Journalist

Agnes Ndirubusa is a Burundian journalist and war correspondent. The former editor-in-chief of the independent newspaper Iwacu, she is particularly known for being arbitrarily imprisoned by the Burundian government in October 2019, along with three of her colleagues, while reporting on armed clashes between Burundian forces and paramilitary groups from the Democratic Republic of the Congo. She was sentenced to two years in prison and was later released before going into exile in Belgium.

== Biography ==
Ndirubusa worked as a political analyst and editor-in-chief for the newspaper Iwacu, one of the last independent media outlets in the country. In 2016, her colleague, Jean Bigirimana, disappeared without a trace. Despite a campaign by the newspaper to uncover the circumstances of his disappearance, few new details have emerged.

On 22 October 2019, while she was in a car with her team of journalists, including Christine Kamikazi, Egide Harerimana, Térence Mpozenzi, and their driver, Adolphe Masabarakiza, she was arrested. They were heading to the Kibira National Park, where clashes were taking place between rebel groups from the Democratic Republic of the Congo and the Burundian army. The police and youths surrounded their car and arrested them, transferring them to the local police station. During the arrest, her colleague, Christine Kamikazi, was slapped by one of the police officers. Ndirubusa was arrested despite having informed the authorities of their group's movements.

After her arrest, she was initially held without specific charges, then accused of "conspiracy against state security" and kept in detention. The prosecutor demanded a 15-year prison sentence for them, and in January 2020, the court sentenced her to two and a half years in prison. The appeal was unsuccessful. This arbitrary persecution by Burundi was widely criticized by the United Nations High Commissioner for Human Rights, media outlets like Le Monde and DW, and non-governmental organizations such as Amnesty International and Human Rights Watch.

Following her release and further threats, she decided to flee to Belgium with her husband and their son.
