= Agnes Kovacs (disambiguation) =

Ágnes Kovács (born 13 July 1981) is a Hungarian swimmer

Agnes Kovacs may also refer to:

- Agnes Melinda Kovacs, Hungarian psychologist, linguist and cognitive scientist
- Ágnes Kovács (ethnographer), Hungarian ethnographer
