= Agnes Catlow =

British science writer

Agnes Catlow (1806–1889) was a 19th-century British science writer best known for a book on conchology.

== Early life ==
Catlow was born in 1806 in Mansfield, Nottinghamshire, the daughter of Samuel and Elizabeth Catlow. By the 1860s Catlow and her sister Maria were living in Chertsey in Surrey.

== Background ==
Not much is known of Catlow's family background and education. It is clear from her publications that she was well-educated, especially in such natural sciences as zoology and entomology. Throughout her life, she travelled widely, sometimes with her sister Maria, who was also a science writer.

Catlow died at her house in Addlestone, Surrey on 10 May 1889 aged 82.

== Career ==
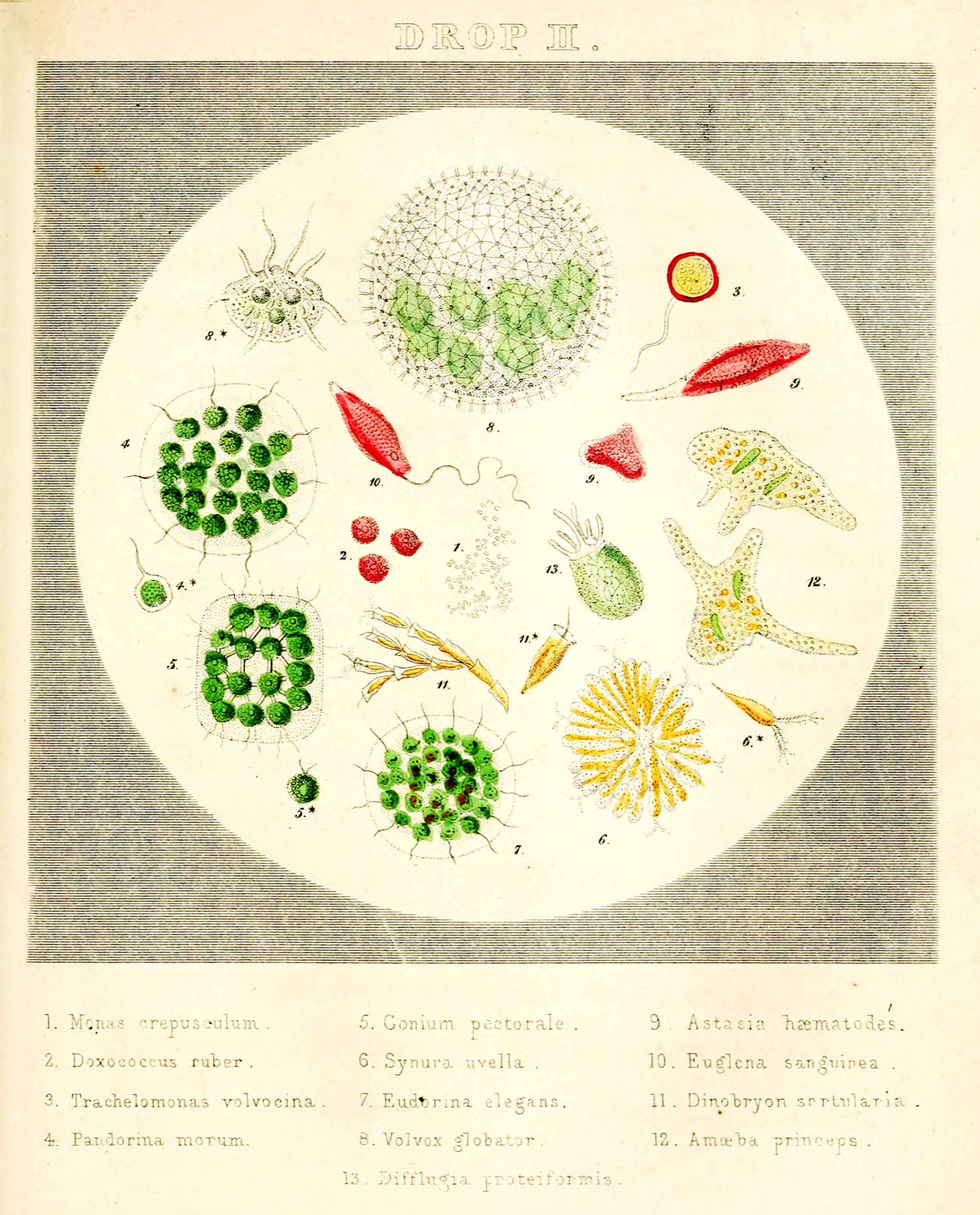
Illustration of 13 microorganisms viewed under a microscope, from Agnes Catlow's 1851 book Drops of Water. Plate signed in Latin "Painted and lithographed by Achilles".

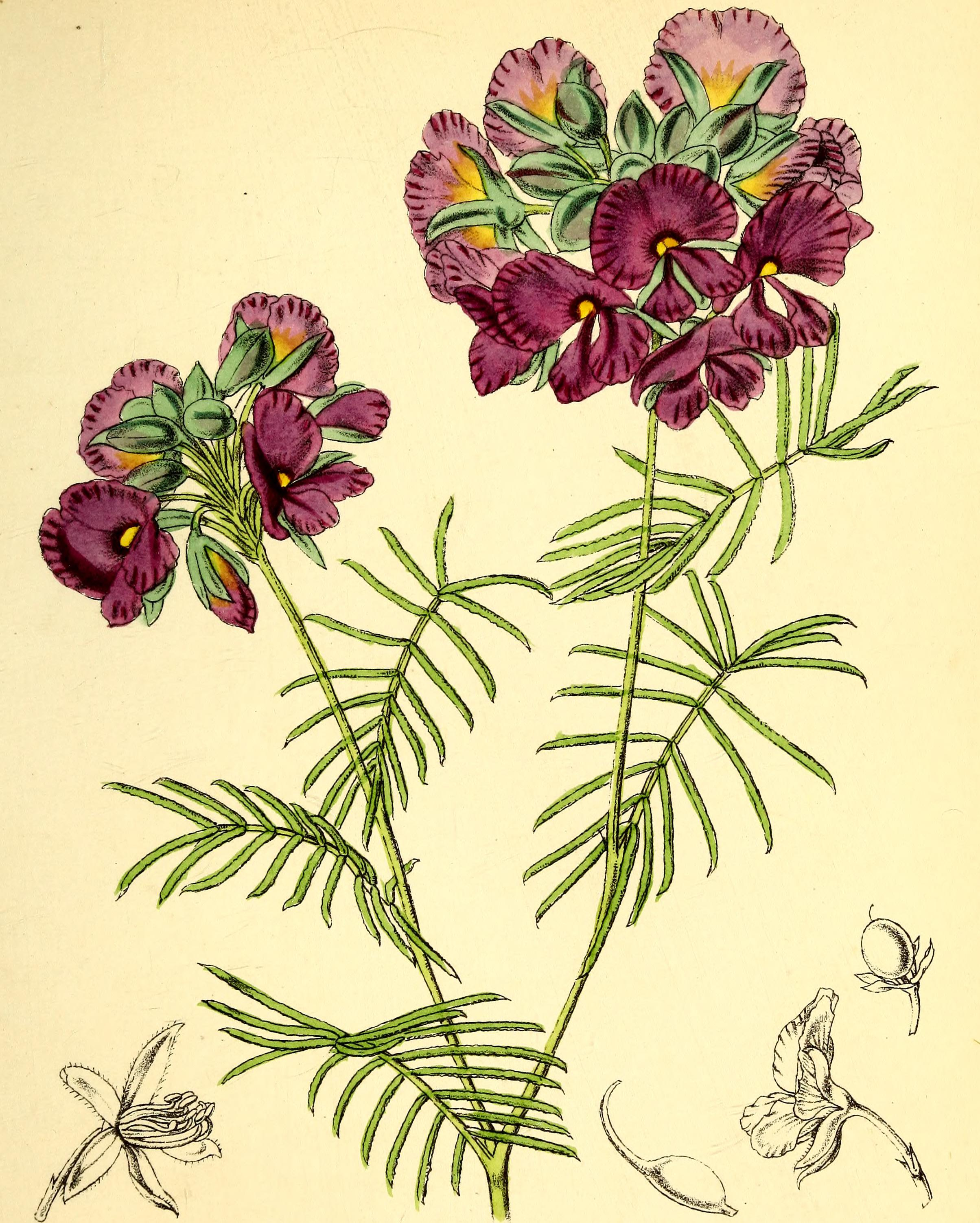
An illustration by Walter Hood Fitch from Agnes Catlow's book Popular Greenhouse Botany (1857)

Catlow was one of a group of mid-Victorian-era women scientific writers who published mainly for children, helping to bring science education into the home. As she said of her work in the preface to Drops of Water, her 1851 book on microscopy, "My experience and observations may be more genial to the beginner, than the scientific treatises of more able authors." Catlow was one of the earlier writers to publish an account of microscopy, which became something of a craze in England in the 1850s.

Her greatest success as an author came with her 1842 book Popular Conchology, at over 350 pages a well-informed and comprehensive overview of both existing shell families and (starting with the second edition) fossil shells. In the first edition, she organised the families and genera according to Jean-Baptiste Lamarck's work; in the second edition, she followed the system of the German-Chilean zoologist Rodolfo Amando Philippi, whose Handbook of Conchology and Malacology had been published not long before. Descriptions were based on the work of Philippi as well as other contemporary authorities. The profuse black-and-white illustrations of shells were mainly derived from images published elsewhere, with a few additions by Catlow herself.

Several of Catlow's books were published by Reeve and Benham, the firm founded by the noted conchologist Lovell Augustus Reeve.

Catlow's Popular Garden Botany (1855) is illustrated by some 20 plates of Walter Hood Fitch's vigorous, brightly colored paintings of common plants like narcissus, asters and fuchsia.

Catlow wrote several books with her sister Maria, including Sketching Rambles: Or, Nature in the Alps and Apennines (1861), illustrated with sketches by the sisters.

== Selected publications ==
- Popular Greenhouse Botany (1857)
- Popular Garden Botany (1855)
- Drops of Water: Their Marvellous and Beautiful Inhabitants Displayed by the Microscope (1851)
- Popular Field Botany (1848)
- The Conchologist's Nomenclator (1845)
- Popular Conchology: Or, the Shell Cabinet Arranged According to the Modern System (1842)
