= Agnès Barthélémy =

French physicist

Academic background
- Thesis: Étude des super-reseaux Fe(001)/Cr(001) et Fe(001)/Ag(001) (1991)
- Doctoral advisor: Albert Fert

Academic work
- Discipline: Physics
- Institutions: University of Paris-Sud; Institut Universitaire de France
- Main interests: Nanostructures

Agnès Barthélémy is a French physicist. She is an expert on nanostructures. She is a professor at Université Paris-Sud and a member of the Institut Universitaire de France.

== Education and career ==
Agnès Barthélémy received her PhD in 1991 from Université Paris-Sud, where she worked under the supervision of Albert Fert.

== Awards ==
- 2008: Prize "Louis Ancel" of the French Physical Society
- 2010: CNRS silver medal
- 2015: Prize Nikola Tesla
- 2017: Prize Lazare Carnot of the Academy of Science
