= Agnes Woods Mitchell =

American author and schoolteacher

- Died: March 22, 1844; Greeneville
- Occupation: Writer

Agnes Woods Mitchell (1802 – March 22, 1844) was a Scottish-born American writer and schoolteacher who published under the penname A. W. M. Her only published book was the collection The Smuggler 's Son, and Other Tales and Sketches (1842).

Mitchell was the eldest daughter of a physician of Ayershire, Scotland who died when she was young. She and some of her family emigrated to the United States in 1828. Around 1833, she and her sister Mary were teachers at the Female Academy in Abingdon, Virginia. Later, the sisters, along with Catherine Melville, ran the Greeneville Female Academy in Greeneville, Tennessee. Mitchell died there in 1844 and the citizens of Greeneville erected a grave marker "in token of their high respect for her many virtues."

The Smuggler's Son is a collection of what literary critic Caroline Zilboorg describes as "vivid stories alternating with unremarkable verse". Mitchell's moralistic tales feature "spoiled, misguided, but likeable heroines who reform and generally marry well" and "irreligious young men" who either also reform or come to a bloody end. Zilboorg notes "Her originality stems from her impressive capturing of Scottish dialects, for her characters speak with charming local syntax and vocabulary."

Mitchell's most well-known poem was "When the Cows Come Home", which is notable for its use of onomatopoeic description. It was reprinted in newspapers and magazines throughout the nineteenth century (from Illustrated Christian Weekly to Secular Review) and appeared in popular volumes of poetry, such as The World’s Best Poetry (1904).
