= Agnes L. Rogers =

Scottish educator and educational psychologist (1884–1943)

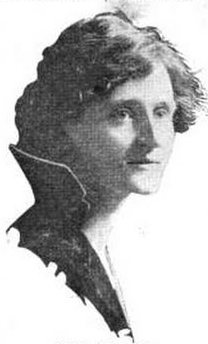
- Agnes L. Rogers, from a 1919 publication.
- Born: Agnes Low Rogers; October 28, 1884; Dundee
- Died: July 16, 1943 (aged 58); Craichie
- Occupation: Professor of education

Agnes Low Rogers (October 28, 1884 – July 16, 1943) was a Scottish educator and educational psychologist.

== Early life ==
Agnes Low Rogers was born in Dundee, the daughter of William Thomson Rogers and Janet Low Rogers. She earned a master's degree at the University of St. Andrews in 1908. She passed the Moral Sciences Tripos at Cambridge in 1911, and completed doctoral studies at Teachers College, Columbia University in 1917. Her dissertation, published the following year, was titled Experimental Tests of Mathematical Ability and their Prognostic Value (1918).

== Career ==
Rogers taught at the University of St. Andrews from 1906 to 1908, at the University of Aberdeen from 1911 to 1914, at Teachers College, Columbia University from 1915 to 1918, at Goucher College from 1918 to 1923, at Smith College from 1923 to 1925, and at Bryn Mawr College from 1925 to 1937. She was director of the Phebe Ann Thorne Model School in Bryn Mawr. She also lectured for the New York Kindergarten Association from 1917 to 1918.

Rogers was an educational psychologist, interested in mathematical abilities and testing. Publications by Rogers included "The Bearing of the New Psychology upon the Teaching of Mathematics" (1916), A Tentative Inventory of Habits (1922), "Measurement of the Abilities and Achievements of Children in the Lower Primary Grades" (1923), "Mental Tests for the Selection of University Students" (1925), and "Report on the Bryn Mawr Test of Ability to Understand Spoken French" (1933).

Rogers was elected to the board of trustees at Teachers College, Columbia University in 1919. She was a member of the American Association of University Women (AAUW), and represented the AAUW at the International Federation of University Women in 1932. She was also a member of the American Psychological Association, the British Association for the Advancement of Science, and the Progressive Education Association.

== Personal life ==
Agnes Low Rogers died in Craichie, Scotland, in 1943, aged 58 years.
