= Agnès Henry-Hocquard =

French vigneron

- Born: Agnès Henry; 1962 (age 63–64); Paris, France
- Occupation: Winemaker
- Known for: Domaine de la Tour du Bon

Agnès Henry-Hocquard (Agnes Henry) is a French vigneron working as a winemaker in Bandol, France who runs the Domaine de la Tour du Bon and is known as a groundbreaking female winemaker.

== Biography ==
Henry-Hocquard's family is from Paris, and they vacationed in the Bandol region when she as a child. Her parents, the Hocquards, purchased Domaine de la Tour du Bon in 1968, where they took over the winemaking operation. Henry studied agribusiness in college and worked in the dairy business until 1989, when her parent asked her to take over the winemaking operations at the Domaine.

== Domaine de la Tour du Bon ==
Domaine de la Tour du Bon is located atop a limestone hill in Le Brûlat du Castellet, in the northwest of the A.O.C. Bandol. The land is situated at an altitude of 150m above sea-level, a high point where maritime breezes cool the hot dry climate.

The Hocquard family began operating the domaine in 1968, but it had been continuously producing wine since 1925 under prior ownership. They spent two years planting new vines to increase production.

Upon taking over the Domaine in 1989, Henry worked with Thierry Puzelat, who served as lead winemaker. Then in 2007, she took over the winemaking operation on her own.

Each year, Henry produces 3,750 cases of wine from 30 acres of vines. Her yield consists mostly of rose wine that is illustrative of the Bandol terroir.
