= Agnes Kirabo =

Ugandan politician

Hon. Agness Kirabo
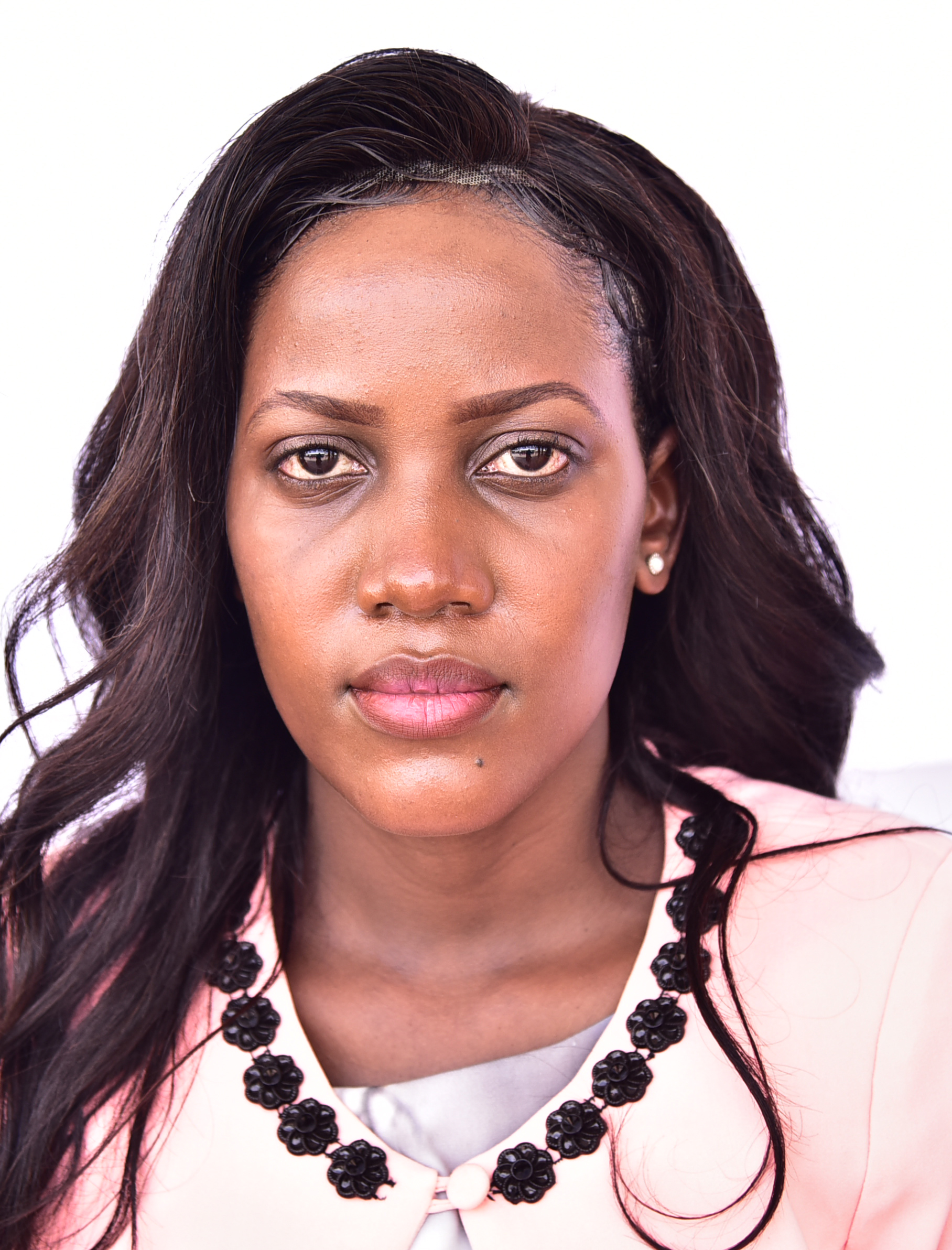

Youth Member of Parliament for Central Region
- Incumbent
- Assumed office 2021
- Constituency: Central Region Youth

Personal details
- Born: Uganda
- Citizenship: Ugandan
- Party: National Resistance Movement (NRM)
- Education: Masters Degree in Business Administration from Makerere University
- Alma mater: Makerere University
- Occupation: Politician
- Known for: Youth representation in Parliament
- Committees: Committee on Trade, Tourism and Industry

Agness Kirabois a Ugandan politician and legislator. She is the youth member of parliament representing Uganda's central region in the parliament of Uganda.

She was voted into parliament on the ticket of the National Resistance Movement (NRM) party, a party under the chairmanship of Yoweri Museveni president of the republic of Uganda.

== Background and Education ==
Kirabo an alumna of Makerere University has a master's degree in Business Administration from the same University.

In the NRM party primary elections for as youth MPs, she won 11 other contenders with 44%of the vote including Justine Namere daughter of Vicent Ssempijja the minister of defence.

During the 2021 general elections, she won 6 males to emerge youth Mp for the central region youth. She garnered 780 votes beating her closest rival Ivan Bwowe the former makerere University Guild president.

== Career ==
Kirabo was formerly an employee at the National Resistance Movement secretariat where she served as secretary for female affairs and as an auditor.

She currently serves as the central region Youth member of parliament.

In parliament, Kirabo serves on the committee on trade, tourism and industry.
