= Ágnes Juhász-Balajcza =

Hungarian volleyball player (born 1952)

Personal information
- Nationality: Hungarian
- Born: 31 December 1952 (age 72); Budapest, Hungary

Sport
- Sport: Volleyball

Ágnes Juhász-Balajcza (born 31 December 1952) is a Hungarian volleyball player. She competed in the women's tournament at the 1980 Summer Olympics.
