= Agnes Lundell =

Finland's first female lawyer

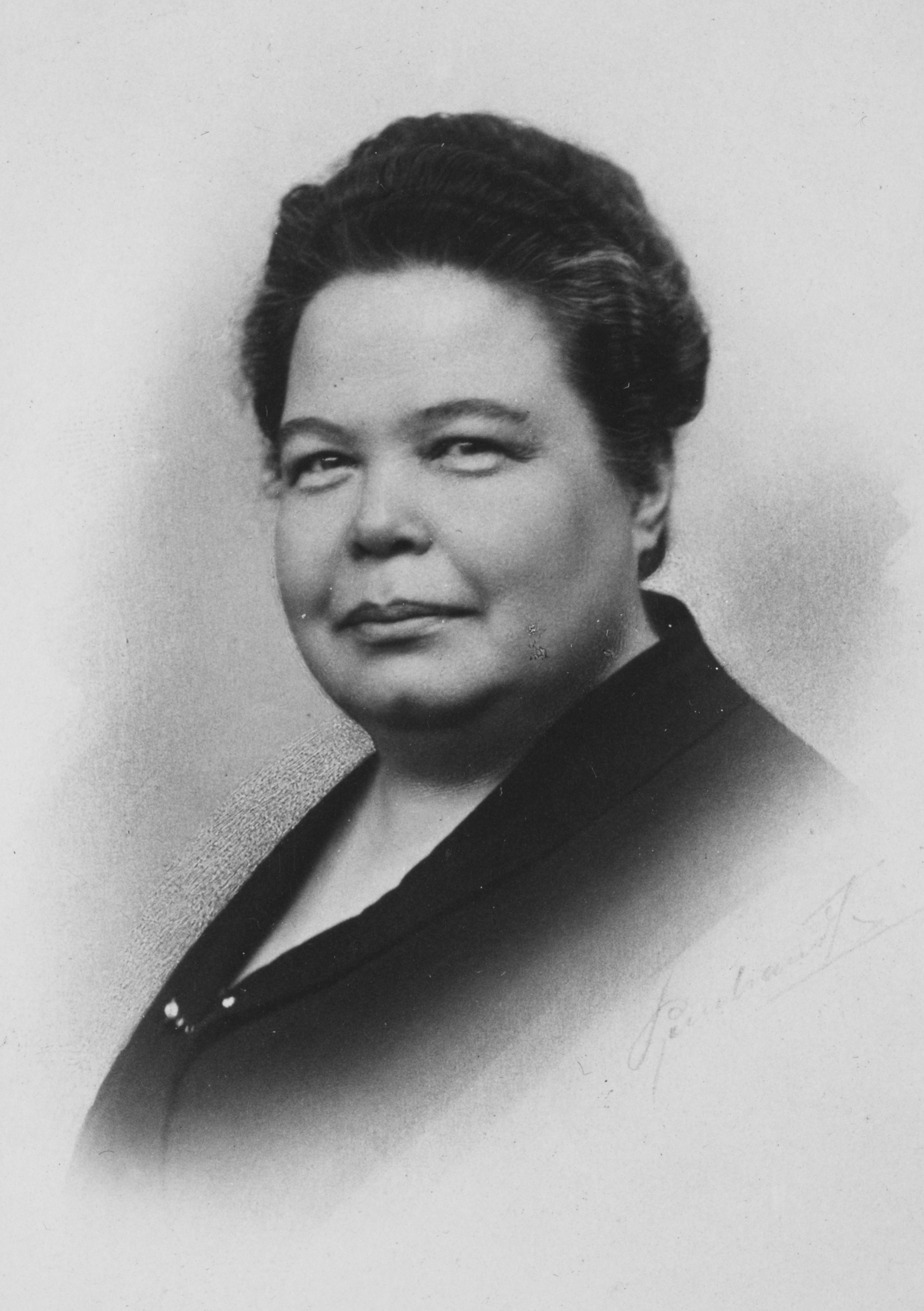
Agnes Lundell

Agnes Lundell (13 July 1878 – 17 September 1936), also known as Agneta, was the Finland's first female lawyer.

== Biography ==
Born on 13 July 1878 in Turku, Finland, Agnes Lundell was the daughter of Alfred Wilhelm Lundell (1839 – 1904) and Olga Wilhelmina Åkerman(1846 – 1900). She studied in a Girls' School at Turku. She later enrolled at the Imperial Alexander University to study law. In 1906 she became the first woman in Finland to graduate with a law degree.

Upon graduation, Agnes Lundell began her legal career as the secretary of a senate division. In 1911 she became the first woman lawyer in Finland.

She also involved in business. With Hjalmar Erlund, one of her school mates from Turku, she established a bilingual law firm named "Lundell & Erlund." In the beginning of her legal career, she faced many challenges including dress code, and the use of her first name in judicial offices.

She was also known for her feminist activities particularly her lectures on upholding women's rights.

She died in Helsinki on 17 September 1936.
