= List of 1972 Summer Olympics medal winners =

The 1972 Summer Olympics were held in Munich, West Germany, from 26 August to 11 September 1972.

== Archery ==
=== Medal table ===
Rank	Nation	Gold	Silver	Bronze	Total
1	United States	2	0	0	2
2	Poland	0	1	0	1
2	Sweden	0	1	0	1
4	Finland	0	0	1	1
4	Soviet Union	0	0	1	1
Totals (5 entries)		2	2	2	6

=== Medalists ===
Event	Gold	Silver	Bronze
Men's	John Williams; United States	Gunnar Jervill; Sweden	Kyösti Laasonen; Finland
Women's	Doreen Wilber; United States	Irena Szydłowska; Poland	Emma Gapchenko; Soviet Union

== Athletics ==
=== Medal table ===
* Host nation (West Germany)

Rank	Nation	Gold	Silver	Bronze	Total
1	Soviet Union	9	7	1	17
2	East Germany	8	7	5	20
3	United States	6	8	8	22
4	West Germany*	6	3	2	11
5	Finland	3	0	1	4
6	Kenya	2	2	2	6
7	Great Britain	1	1	2	4
8	Poland	1	0	2	3
9	Czechoslovakia	1	0	1	2
10	Uganda	1	0	0	1
11	Bulgaria	0	2	2	4
12	Australia	0	2	0	2
12	Belgium	0	2	0	2
12	Romania	0	2	0	2
15	France	0	1	1	2
16	Tunisia	0	1	0	1
17	Cuba	0	0	2	2
17	Ethiopia	0	0	2	2
17	Italy	0	0	2	2
20	Austria	0	0	1	1
20	Brazil	0	0	1	1
20	Jamaica	0	0	1	1
20	New Zealand	0	0	1	1
20	Sweden	0	0	1	1
Totals (24 entries)		38	38	38	114

=== Men's events ===
Event	Gold		Silver		Bronze	
100 metres	Valeriy Borzov; Soviet Union	10.14	Robert Taylor; United States	10.24	Lennox Miller; Jamaica	10.33
200 metres	Valeriy Borzov; Soviet Union	20.00	Larry Black; United States	20.19	Pietro Mennea; Italy	20.30
400 metres	Vincent Matthews; United States	44.66	Wayne Collett; United States	44.80	Julius Sang; Kenya	44.92
800 metres	Dave Wottle; United States	1:45.86	Yevhen Arzhanov; Soviet Union	1:45.89	Mike Boit; Kenya	1:46.01
1500 metres	Pekka Vasala; Finland	3:36.33	Kipchoge Keino; Kenya	3:36.81	Rod Dixon; New Zealand	3:37.46
5000 metres	Lasse Virén; Finland	13:26.42 (OR)	Mohammed Gammoudi; Tunisia	13:27.33	Ian Stewart; Great Britain	13:27.61
10,000 metres	Lasse Virén; Finland	27:38.35 (WR)	Emiel Puttemans; Belgium	27:39.58	Miruts Yifter; Ethiopia	27:40.96
110 metres hurdles	Rod Milburn; United States	13.24 (WR)	Guy Drut; France	13.34	Thomas Hill; United States	13.48
400 metres hurdles	John Akii-Bua; Uganda	47.82 (WR)	Ralph Mann; United States	48.51	David Hemery; Great Britain	48.52
3000 metres steeplechase	Kipchoge Keino; Kenya	8:23.64 (OR)	Ben Jipcho; Kenya	8:24.62	Tapio Kantanen; Finland	8:24.66
4 × 100 metres relay	United States; Larry Black; Robert Taylor; Gerald Tinker; Eddie Hart	38.19 (WR)	Soviet Union; Aleksandr Kornelyuk; Vladimir Lovetskiy; Juris Silovs; Valeriy Borzov	38.50	West Germany; Jobst Hirscht; Karlheinz Klotz; Gerhard Wucherer; Klaus Ehl	38.79
4 × 400 metres relay	Kenya; Charles Asati; Munyoro Nyamau; Robert Ouko; Julius Sang	2:59.83	Great Britain; Martin Reynolds; Alan Pascoe; David Hemery; David Jenkins	3:00.46	France; Gilles Bertould; Daniel Velasques; Francis Kerbiriou; Jacques Carette	3:00.65
Marathon	Frank Shorter; United States	2:12:19.8	Karel Lismont; Belgium	2:14:31.8	Mamo Wolde; Ethiopia	2:15:08.4
20 kilometres walk	Peter Frenkel; East Germany	1:26:42.4 (OR)	Volodymyr Holubnychy; Soviet Union	1:26:55.2	Hans-Georg Reimann; East Germany	1:27:16.6
50 kilometres walk	Bernd Kannenberg; West Germany	3:56:11.6 (OR)	Veniamin Soldatenko; Soviet Union	3:58:24.0	Larry Young; United States	4:00:46.0
High jump	Jüri Tarmak; Soviet Union	2.23 m	Stefan Junge; East Germany	2.21 m	Dwight Stones; United States	2.21 m
Pole vault	Wolfgang Nordwig; East Germany	5.50 m (OR)	Bob Seagren; United States	5.40 m	Jan Johnson; United States	5.35 m
Long jump	Randy Williams; United States	8.24 m	Hans Baumgartner; West Germany	8.18 m	Arnie Robinson; United States	8.03 m
Triple jump	Viktor Saneyev; Soviet Union	17.35 m	Jörg Drehmel; East Germany	17.31 m	Nelson Prudêncio; Brazil	17.05 m
Shot put	Władysław Komar; Poland	21.18 m (OR)	George Woods; United States	21.17 m	Hartmut Briesenick; East Germany	21.14 m
Discus throw	Ludvík Daněk; Czechoslovakia	64.40 m	Jay Silvester; United States	63.50 m	Ricky Bruch; Sweden	63.40 m
Hammer throw	Anatolij Bondarčuk; Soviet Union	75.50 m (OR)	Jochen Sachse; East Germany	74.96 m	Vasiliy Khmelevskiy; Soviet Union	74.04 m
Javelin throw	Klaus Wolfermann; West Germany	90.48 m (OR)	Jānis Lūsis; Soviet Union	90.46 m	Bill Schmidt; United States	84.42 m
Decathlon	Mykola Avilov; Soviet Union	8454 pts (WR)	Leonid Lytvynenko; Soviet Union	8035 pts	Ryszard Katus; Poland	7984 pts

=== Women's events ===
Games	Gold		Silver		Bronze	
100 metres	Renate Stecher; East Germany	11.07 (WR)	Raelene Boyle; Australia	11.23	Silvia Chivás; Cuba	11.24
200 metres	Renate Stecher; East Germany	22.40 (=WR)	Raelene Boyle; Australia	22.45	Irena Szewińska; Poland	22.74
400 metres	Monika Zehrt; East Germany	51.08	Rita Wilden; West Germany	51.21	Kathy Hammond; United States	51.64
800 metres	Hildegard Falck; West Germany	1:58.55 (OR)	Nijolė Sabaitė; Soviet Union	1:58.65	Gunhild Hoffmeister; East Germany	1:59.19
1500 metres	Lyudmila Bragina; Soviet Union	4:01.38 (WR)	Gunhild Hoffmeister; East Germany	4:02.83	Paola Pigni; Italy	4:02.85
100 metres hurdles	Annelie Ehrhardt; East Germany	12.59 (WR)	Valeria Bufanu; Romania	12.84	Karin Balzer; East Germany	12.90
4 × 100 metres relay	West Germany; Christiane Krause; Ingrid Becker; Annegret Richter; Heide Rosendahl	42.81 (WR)	East Germany; Evelin Kaufer; Christina Heinich; Bärbel Struppert; Renate Stecher	42.95	Cuba; Marlene Elejarde; Carmen Valdés; Fulgencia Romay; Silvia Chivás	43.36
4 × 400 metres relay	East Germany; Dagmar Käsling; Rita Kühne; Helga Seidler; Monika Zehrt	3:22.95 (WR)	United States; Mable Fergerson; Madeline Manning; Cheryl Toussaint; Kathy Hammond	3:25.15	West Germany; Anette Rückes; Inge Bödding; Hildegard Falck; Rita Wilden	3:26.51
High jump	Ulrike Meyfarth; West Germany	1.92 m (=WR)	Yordanka Blagoeva; Bulgaria	1.88 m	Ilona Gusenbauer; Austria	1.88 m
Long jump	Heide Rosendahl; West Germany	6.78 m	Diana Yorgova; Bulgaria	6.77 m	Eva Šuranová; Czechoslovakia	6.67 m
Shot put	Nadezhda Chizhova; Soviet Union	21.03 m (WR)	Margitta Gummel; East Germany	20.22 m	Ivanka Khristova; Bulgaria	19.35 m
Discus throw	Faina Melnik; Soviet Union	66.62 m (OR)	Argentina Menis; Romania	65.06 m	Vasilka Stoeva; Bulgaria	64.34 m
Javelin throw	Ruth Fuchs; East Germany	63.88 m (OR)	Jacqueline Todten; East Germany	62.54 m	Kate Schmidt; United States	59.94 m
Pentathlon	Mary Peters; Great Britain	4801 pts (WR)	Heide Rosendahl; West Germany	4791 pts	Burglinde Pollak; East Germany	4768 pts

== Basketball ==
=== Medal table ===
Rank	NOC	Gold	Silver	Bronze	Total
1	Soviet Union	1	0	0	1
2	United States	0	1	0	1
3	Cuba	0	0	1	1
Totals (3 entries)		1	1	1	3

=== Medalists ===
Event	Gold	Silver	Bronze
Men's	Soviet Union; Anatoli Polivoda; Modestas Paulauskas; Zurab Sakandelidze; Alzhan Zharmukhamedov; Aleksandr Boloshev; Ivan Edeshko; Sergei Belov; Mikheil Korkia; Ivan Dvorny; Gennadi Volnov; Aleksandr Belov; Sergei Kovalenko	United States; Kenneth Davis; Doug Collins; Tom Henderson; Mike Bantom; Robert Jones; Dwight Jones; James Forbes; Jim Brewer; Tommy Burleson; Tom McMillen; Kevin Joyce; Ed Ratleff	Cuba; Juan Carlos Domecq Fortuondo; Ruperto Herrera Tabio; Juan Roca Brunet; Pedro Chappe Garcia; Miguel Álvarez Pozo; Rafael Cañizares Poey; Conrado Perez Armenteros; Miguel Calderon Gomez; Tomas Herrera Martinez; Oscar Varona Varona; Alejandro Urgelles Guibot; Franklin Standard Johnson

== Boxing ==
=== Medal table ===
* Host nation (West Germany)

Rank	Nation	Gold	Silver	Bronze	Total
1	Cuba	3	1	1	5
2	Soviet Union	2	0	0	2
3	Hungary	1	2	1	4
4	Poland	1	1	2	4
5	Bulgaria	1	1	0	2
6	United States	1	0	3	4
7	West Germany*	1	0	1	2
7	Yugoslavia	1	0	1	2
9	Kenya	0	1	2	3
10	Finland	0	1	0	1
10	Mexico	0	1	0	1
10	North Korea	0	1	0	1
10	Romania	0	1	0	1
10	Uganda	0	1	0	1
15	Great Britain	0	0	3	3
16	Colombia	0	0	2	2
17	East Germany	0	0	1	1
17	Ghana	0	0	1	1
17	Niger	0	0	1	1
17	Nigeria	0	0	1	1
17	Spain	0	0	1	1
17	Sweden	0	0	1	1
Totals (22 entries)		11	11	22	44

=== Medalists ===
Event	Gold	Silver	Bronze
Light flyweight (–48 kg)	György Gedó; Hungary	Kim U-gil; North Korea	Ralph Evans; Great Britain
Light flyweight (–48 kg)	György Gedó; Hungary	Kim U-gil; North Korea	Enrique Rodríguez; Spain
Flyweight (–51 kg)	Georgi Kostadinov; Bulgaria	Leo Rwabwogo; Uganda	Leszek Błażyński; Poland
Flyweight (–51 kg)	Georgi Kostadinov; Bulgaria	Leo Rwabwogo; Uganda	Douglas Rodríguez; Cuba
Bantamweight (–54 kg)	Orlando Martínez; Cuba	Alfonso Zamora; Mexico	Ricardo Carreras; United States
Bantamweight (–54 kg)	Orlando Martínez; Cuba	Alfonso Zamora; Mexico	George Turpin; Great Britain
Featherweight (–57 kg)	Boris Kuznetsov; Soviet Union	Philip Waruinge; Kenya	András Botos; Hungary
Featherweight (–57 kg)	Boris Kuznetsov; Soviet Union	Philip Waruinge; Kenya	Clemente Rojas; Colombia
Lightweight (–60 kg)	Jan Szczepański; Poland	László Orbán; Hungary	Samuel Mbugua; Kenya
Lightweight (–60 kg)	Jan Szczepański; Poland	László Orbán; Hungary	Alfonso Pérez; Colombia
Light welterweight (–63 kg)	Sugar Ray Seales; United States	Angel Angelov; Bulgaria	Issaka Daborg; Niger
Light welterweight (–63 kg)	Sugar Ray Seales; United States	Angel Angelov; Bulgaria	Zvonimir Vujin; Yugoslavia
Welterweight (–67 kg)	Emilio Correa; Cuba	János Kajdi; Hungary	Dick Murunga; Kenya
Welterweight (–67 kg)	Emilio Correa; Cuba	János Kajdi; Hungary	Jesse Valdez; United States
Light middleweight (–71 kg)	Dieter Kottysch; West Germany	Wiesław Rudkowski; Poland	Alan Minter; Great Britain
Light middleweight (–71 kg)	Dieter Kottysch; West Germany	Wiesław Rudkowski; Poland	Peter Tiepold; East Germany
Middleweight (–75 kg)	Vyacheslav Lemeshev; Soviet Union	Reima Virtanen; Finland	Prince Amartey; Ghana
Middleweight (–75 kg)	Vyacheslav Lemeshev; Soviet Union	Reima Virtanen; Finland	Marvin Johnson; United States
Light heavyweight (–81 kg)	Mate Parlov; Yugoslavia	Gilberto Carrillo; Cuba	Janusz Gortat; Poland
Light heavyweight (–81 kg)	Mate Parlov; Yugoslavia	Gilberto Carrillo; Cuba	Isaac Ikhouria; Nigeria
Heavyweight (+81 kg)	Teófilo Stevenson; Cuba	Ion Alexe; Romania	Peter Hussing; West Germany
Heavyweight (+81 kg)	Teófilo Stevenson; Cuba	Ion Alexe; Romania	Hasse Thomsén; Sweden

== Canoeing ==
=== Medal table ===
* Host nation (West Germany)

Rank	Nation	Gold	Silver	Bronze	Total
1	Soviet Union	6	0	0	6
2	East Germany	4	1	1	6
3	Romania	1	2	1	4
4	West Germany*	0	3	2	5
5	Hungary	0	2	2	4
6	Austria	0	1	0	1
6	Netherlands	0	1	0	1
6	Sweden	0	1	0	1
9	Bulgaria	0	0	1	1
9	France	0	0	1	1
9	Norway	0	0	1	1
9	Poland	0	0	1	1
9	United States	0	0	1	1
Totals (13 entries)		11	11	11	33

=== Slalom ===
==== Men's events ====
Games	Gold	Silver	Bronze
Men's C-1	Reinhard Eiben; East Germany	Reinhold Kauder; West Germany	Jamie McEwan; United States
Men's C-2	East Germany; Walter Hofmann; Rolf-Dieter Amend	West Germany; Hans-Otto Schumacher; Wilhelm Baues	France; Jean-Louis Olry; Jean-Claude Olry
Men's K-1	Siegbert Horn; East Germany	Norbert Sattler; Austria	Harald Gimpel; East Germany

==== Women's events ====
Games	Gold	Silver	Bronze
Women's K-1	Angelika Bahmann; East Germany	Gisela Grothaus; West Germany	Magdalena Wunderlich; West Germany

=== Sprint ===
==== Men's events ====
Games	Gold	Silver	Bronze
C-1 1000 metres	Ivan Patzaichin; Romania	Tamás Wichmann; Hungary	Detlef Lewe; West Germany
C-2 1000 metres	Soviet Union; Vladas Česiūnas; Yuri Lobanov	Romania; Ivan Patzaichin; Serghei Covaliov	Bulgaria; Fedia Damianov; Ivan Burtchin
K-1 1000 metres	Aleksandr Shaparenko; Soviet Union	Rolf Peterson; Sweden	Géza Csapó; Hungary
K-2 1000 metres	Soviet Union; Nikolai Gorbachev; Viktor Kratasyuk	Hungary; József Deme; János Rátkai	Poland; Władysław Szuszkiewicz; Rafał Piszcz
K-4 1000 metres	Soviet Union; Yuri Filatov; Yuri Stetsenko; Vladimir Morozov; Valeri Didenko	Romania; Aurel Vernescu; Mihai Zafiu; Roman Vartolomeu; Atanase Sciotnic	Norway; Egil Søby; Steinar Amundsen; Tore Berger; Jan Johansen

==== Women's events ====
Games	Gold	Silver	Bronze
K-1 500 metres	Yulia Ryabchinskaya; Soviet Union	Mieke Jaapies; Netherlands	Anna Pfeffer; Hungary
K-2 500 metres	Soviet Union; Lyudmila Pinayeva; Yekaterina Kuryshko	East Germany; Ilse Kaschube; Petra Grabowski	Romania; Maria Nichiforov; Viorica Dumitru

== Cycling ==
=== Medal table ===
* Host nation (West Germany)

Rank	Nation	Gold	Silver	Bronze	Total
1	Soviet Union	2	0	1	3
2	West Germany*	1	0	1	2
3	Denmark	1	0	0	1
3	France	1	0	0	1
3	Netherlands	1	0	0	1
3	Norway	1	0	0	1
7	Australia	0	3	0	3
8	East Germany	0	2	1	3
9	Poland	0	1	1	2
10	Switzerland	0	1	0	1
11	Great Britain	0	0	1	1
Totals (11 entries)		7	7	5	19

=== Road cycling ===
Event	Gold	Silver	Bronze
Individual road race	Hennie Kuiper; Netherlands	Clyde Sefton; Australia	no medal awarded
Team time trial	Soviet Union; Valery Yardy; Gennady Komnatov; Valery Likhachov; Boris Shukov	Poland; Ryszard Szurkowski; Edward Barcik; Lucjan Lis; Stanisław Szozda	no medal awarded

=== Track cycling ===
Event	Gold	Silver	Bronze
Individual pursuit	Knut Knudsen; Norway	Xaver Kurmann; Switzerland	Hans Lutz; West Germany
Team pursuit	West Germany; Günther Schumacher; Jürgen Colombo; Günter Haritz; Udo Hempel	East Germany; Uwe Unterwalder; Thomas Huschke; Heinz Richter; Herbert Richter	Great Britain; William Moore; Michael Bennett; Ian Hallam; Ronald Keeble
Sprint	Daniel Morelon; France	John Nicholson; Australia	Omar Pkhakadze; Soviet Union
Tandem	Soviet Union; Vladimir Semenets; Igor Tselovalnykov	East Germany; Jürgen Geschke; Werner Otto	Poland; Andrzej Bek; Benedykt Kocot
Time trial	Niels Fredborg; Denmark	Danny Clark; Australia	Jürgen Schütze; East Germany

== Diving ==
=== Medal table ===
Rank	Nation	Gold	Silver	Bronze	Total
1	Italy	1	1	1	3
1	United States	1	1	1	3
3	Sweden	1	1	0	2
4	Soviet Union	1	0	0	1
5	Czechoslovakia	0	1	0	1
6	East Germany	0	0	2	2
Totals (6 entries)		4	4	4	12

=== Men's events ===
Event	Gold	Silver	Bronze
3 m springboard	Vladimir Vasin; Soviet Union	Giorgio Cagnotto; Italy	Craig Lincoln; United States
10 m platform	Klaus Dibiasi; Italy	Richard Rydze; United States	Giorgio Cagnotto; Italy

=== Women's events ===
Event	Gold	Silver	Bronze
3 m springboard	Micki King; United States	Ulrika Knape; Sweden	Marina Janicke; East Germany
10 m platform	Ulrika Knape; Sweden	Milena Duchková; Czechoslovakia	Marina Janicke; East Germany

== Equestrian events ==
=== Medal table ===
* Host nation (West Germany)

Rank	Nation	Gold	Silver	Bronze	Total
1	West Germany*	2	1	2	5
2	Great Britain	2	1	0	3
3	Italy	1	1	1	3
4	Soviet Union	1	1	0	2
5	United States	0	2	1	3
6	Sweden	0	0	2	2
Totals (6 entries)		6	6	6	18

=== Medalists ===
Games	Gold	Silver	Bronze
Individual dressage	Liselott Linsenhoff on Piaff (FRG)	Yelena Petushkova on Pepel (URS)	Josef Neckermann on Venetia (FRG)
Team dressage	Soviet Union; Yelena Petushkova and Pepel; Ivan Kizimov and Ikhor; Ivan Kalita and Tarif	West Germany; Karin Schlüter and Liostro; Liselott Linsenhoff and Piaff; Josef Neckermann and Venetia	Sweden; Ulla Håkansson and Ajax; Ninna Swaab and Casanova; Maud von Rosen and Lucky Boy
Individual eventing	Richard Meade on Laurieston (GBR)	Alessandro Argenton on Woodland (ITA)	Jan Jönsson on Sarajevo (SWE)
Team eventing	Great Britain; Richard Meade and Laurieston; Mary Gordon-Watson and Cornishman V Bridget Parker and Cornish Gold; Mark Phillips and Great Ovation	United States; Kevin Freeman and Good Mixture; Bruce Davidson and Plain Sailing; Michael Plumb and Free and Easy; James C. Wofford and Kilkenny	West Germany; Harry Klugmann and Christopher Robert; Ludwig Gössing and Chicago; Karl Schultz and Pisco; Horst Karsten and Sioux
Individual jumping	Graziano Mancinelli on Ambassador (ITA)	Ann Moore on Psalm (GBR)	Neal Shapiro on Sloopy (USA)
Team jumping	West Germany; Fritz Ligges and Robin; Gerhard Wiltfang and Askan; Hartwig Steenken and Simona; Hans Günter Winkler and Trophy	United States; William Steinkraus and Main Spring; Neal Shapiro and Sloopy; Kathryn Kusner and Fleet Apple; Frank Chapot and White Lightning	Italy; Vittorio Orlandi and Fulmer Feather; Raimondo D'Inzeo and Fiorello; Graziano Mancinelli and Ambassador; Piero D'Inzeo and Easter Light

== Fencing ==
=== Medal table ===
Rank	Nation	Gold	Silver	Bronze	Total
1	Hungary	2	4	2	8
2	Soviet Union	2	2	3	7
3	Italy	2	0	0	2
3	Poland	2	0	0	2
5	France	0	1	2	3
6	Switzerland	0	1	0	1
7	Romania	0	0	1	1
Totals (7 entries)		8	8	8	24

=== Men's events ===
Games	Gold	Silver	Bronze
Individual épée	Csaba Fenyvesi; Hungary	Jacques Ladegaillerie; France	Győző Kulcsár; Hungary
Team épée	Hungary; Sándor Erdős; Csaba Fenyvesi; Győző Kulcsár; Pál Schmitt; István Osztrics	Switzerland; Guy Evequoz; Daniel Giger; Christian Kauter; Peter Lötscher; François Suchanecki	Soviet Union; Viktor Modzolevsky; Sergei Paramonov; Igor Valetov; Georgi Zažitski; Grigori Kriss
Individual foil	Witold Woyda; Poland	Jenő Kamuti; Hungary	Christian Noël; France
Team foil	Poland; Marek Dąbrowski; Jerzy Kaczmarek; Lech Koziejowski; Witold Woyda; Arkadiusz Godel	Soviet Union; Vladimir Denisov; Anatoli Kotetsev; Leonid Romanov; Vasili Stankovich; Victor Putyatin	France; Jean-Claude Magnan; Christian Noël; Daniel Revenu; Bernard Talvard; Gilles Berolatti
Individual sabre	Viktor Sidyak; Soviet Union	Péter Marót; Hungary	Vladimir Nazlymov; Soviet Union
Team sabre	Italy; Michele Maffei; Mario Aldo Montano; Mario Tullio Montano; Rolando Rigoli; Cesare Salvadori	Soviet Union; Viktor Bashenov; Vladimir Nazlymov; Viktor Sidyak; Eduard Vinokurov; Mark Rakita	Hungary; Pál Gerevich; Tamás Kovács; Péter Marót; Tibor Pézsa; Péter Bakonyi

=== Women's events ===
Games	Gold	Silver	Bronze
Individual foil	Antonella Ragno-Lonzi; Italy	Ildikó Bóbis; Hungary	Galina Gorokhova; Soviet Union
Team foil	Soviet Union; Elena Belova; Galina Gorokhova; Tatyana Samusenko; Aleksandra Zabelina; Svetlana Tširkova	Hungary; Ildikó Bóbis; Ildikó Újlaky-Rejtő; Ildikó Schwarczenberger; Mária Gulácsi-Szolnoki; Ildikó Matuscsák-Rónay	Romania; Ileana Gyulai-Drimba-Jenei; Ana Dersidan-Ene-Pascu; Ecaterina Iencic-Stahl; Olga Orban-Szabo

== Field hockey ==
=== Medal table ===
* Host nation (West Germany)

Rank	Nation	Gold	Silver	Bronze	Total
1	West Germany*	1	0	0	1
2	Pakistan	0	1	0	1
3	India	0	0	1	1
Totals (3 entries)		1	1	1	3

=== Medalists ===
Event	Gold	Silver	Bronze
Men's	West Germany; Wolfgang Baumgart; Horst Drose; Dieter Freise; Werner Kaessmann; Carsten Keller; Detlev Kittstein; Ulrich Klaes; Peter Kraus; Michael Krause; Michael Peter; Wolfgang Rott; Fritz Schmidt; Rainer Seifert; Wolfgang Strodter; Eckart Suhl; Eduard Thelen; Peter Trump; Ulrich Vos	Pakistan; Rashid Abdul; Akhtar Rasool; Ul Akhtar; Jahangir Butt; Fazalur Rehman; Islahuddin Siddiquee; Muhammad Asad Malik; Shahnaz Sheikh; Munawwaruz Zaman; Ahmad Riaz; Saeed Anwar; Saleem Sherwani; Iftikar Syed; Mudassar Asghar; Zahid Sheikh	India; B. P. Govinda; Charles Cornelius; Manuel Frederick; Michael Kindo; V.J. Philips; Ashok Kumar; M. P. Ganesh; Krishnamurty Perumal; Ajitpal Singh; Harbinder Singh; Harcharan Singh; Harmik Singh; Kulwant Singh; Mukhbain Singh; Virinder Singh; Vece Paes

== Football ==
=== Medal table ===
Rank	Nation	Gold	Silver	Bronze	Total
1	Poland	1	0	0	1
2	Hungary	0	1	0	1
3	East Germany	0	0	1	1
3	Soviet Union	0	0	1	1
Totals (4 entries)		1	1	2	4

=== Medalists ===
Event	Gold	Silver	Bronze
Men's	Poland; Hubert Kostka; Zbigniew Gut; Jerzy Gorgoń; Zygmunt Anczok; Lesław Ćmikiewicz; Zygmunt Maszczyk; Jerzy Kraska; Kazimierz Deyna; Zygfryd Szołtysik; Włodzimierz Lubański; Robert Gadocha; Ryszard Szymczak; Antoni Szymanowski; Joachim Marx; Grzegorz Lato; Marian Ostafiński; Kazimierz Kmiecik; Marian Szeja	Hungary; István Géczi; Péter Vépi; Miklós Páncsics; Péter Juhász; Lajos Szűcs; Mihály Kozma; Antal Dunai; Lajos Kű; Béla Váradi; Ede Dunai; László Bálint; Lajos Kocsis; Kálmán Tóth; László Branikovits; József Kovács; Csaba Vidács; Adám Rothermel	East Germany; Jürgen Croy; Manfred Zapf; Konrad Weise; Bernd Bransch; Jürgen Pommerenke; Jürgen Sparwasser; Hans-Jürgen Kreische; Joachim Streich; Wolfgang Seguin; Peter Ducke; Frank Ganzera; Lothar Kurbjuweit; Eberhard Vogel; Harald Irmscher; Ralf Schulenberg; Reinhard Häfner; Siegmar Wätzlich
Men's	Poland; Hubert Kostka; Zbigniew Gut; Jerzy Gorgoń; Zygmunt Anczok; Lesław Ćmikiewicz; Zygmunt Maszczyk; Jerzy Kraska; Kazimierz Deyna; Zygfryd Szołtysik; Włodzimierz Lubański; Robert Gadocha; Ryszard Szymczak; Antoni Szymanowski; Joachim Marx; Grzegorz Lato; Marian Ostafiński; Kazimierz Kmiecik; Marian Szeja	Hungary; István Géczi; Péter Vépi; Miklós Páncsics; Péter Juhász; Lajos Szűcs; Mihály Kozma; Antal Dunai; Lajos Kű; Béla Váradi; Ede Dunai; László Bálint; Lajos Kocsis; Kálmán Tóth; László Branikovits; József Kovács; Csaba Vidács; Adám Rothermel	Soviet Union; Oleh Blokhin; Murtaz Khurtsilava; Yuriy Istomin; Volodymyr Kaplychnyi; Viktor Kolotov; Yevgeni Lovchev; Sergei Olshansky; Yevhen Rudakov; Vyacheslav Semyonov; Gennadi Evryuzhikhin; Oganes Zanazanyan; Andrei Yakubik; Arkady Andreasyan; Revaz Dzodzuashvili; Yozhef Sabo; Yuriy Yeliseyev; Volodymyr Onyshchenko; Anatoliy Kuksov; Vladimir Pilgui

== Gymnastics ==
=== Medal table ===
Rank	Nation	Gold	Silver	Bronze	Total
1	Soviet Union	6	6	4	16
2	Japan	5	5	6	16
3	East Germany	3	4	2	9
4	Hungary	0	0	1	1
Totals (4 entries)		14	15	13	42

=== Men's events ===
Games	Gold	Silver	Bronze
Individual all-around	Sawao Kato; Japan	Eizo Kenmotsu; Japan	Akinori Nakayama; Japan
Team all-around	Japan; Shigeru Kasamatsu; Sawao Kato; Eizo Kenmotsu; Akinori Nakayama; Teruichi Okamura; Mitsuo Tsukahara	Soviet Union; Nikolai Andrianov; Viktor Klimenko; Alexander Maleev; Edvard Mikaelian; Vladimir Schukin; Mikhail Voronin	East Germany; Matthias Brehme; Wolfgang Klotz; Klaus Köste; Jürgen Paeke; Reinhard Rychly; Wolfgang Thüne
Floor exercise	Nikolai Andrianov; Soviet Union	Akinori Nakayama; Japan	Shigeru Kasamatsu; Japan
Horizontal bar	Mitsuo Tsukahara; Japan	Sawao Kato; Japan	Shigeru Kasamatsu; Japan
Parallel bars	Sawao Kato; Japan	Shigeru Kasamatsu; Japan	Eizo Kenmotsu; Japan
Pommel horse	Viktor Klimenko; Soviet Union	Sawao Kato; Japan	Eizo Kenmotsu; Japan
Rings	Akinori Nakayama; Japan	Mikhail Voronin; Soviet Union	Mitsuo Tsukahara; Japan
Vault	Klaus Köste; East Germany	Viktor Klimenko; Soviet Union	Nikolai Andrianov; Soviet Union

=== Women's events ===
Games	Gold	Silver	Bronze
Individual all-around	Ludmila Tourischeva; Soviet Union	Karin Janz; East Germany	Tamara Lazakovich; Soviet Union
Team all-around	Soviet Union; Lyubov Burda; Olga Korbut; Antonina Koshel; Tamara Lazakovich; Elvira Saadi; Ludmila Tourischeva	East Germany; Irene Abel; Angelika Hellmann; Karin Janz; Richarda Schmeißer; Christine Schmitt; Erika Zuchold	Hungary; Ilona Békési; Mónika Császár; Marta Kelemen; Anikó Kéry; Krisztina Medveczky; Zsuzsa Nagy
Balance beam	Olga Korbut; Soviet Union	Tamara Lazakovich; Soviet Union	Karin Janz; East Germany
Floor exercise	Olga Korbut; Soviet Union	Ludmila Tourischeva; Soviet Union	Tamara Lazakovich; Soviet Union
Uneven bars	Karin Janz; East Germany	Olga Korbut; Soviet Union	None awarded (as there was a tie for silver)
Uneven bars	Karin Janz; East Germany	Erika Zuchold; East Germany	None awarded (as there was a tie for silver)
Vault	Karin Janz; East Germany	Erika Zuchold; East Germany	Ludmila Tourischeva; Soviet Union

== Handball ==
=== Medal table ===
Rank	Nation	Gold	Silver	Bronze	Total
1	Yugoslavia	1	0	0	1
2	Czechoslovakia	0	1	0	1
3	Romania	0	0	1	1
Totals (3 entries)		1	1	1	3

=== Medalists ===
Event	Gold	Silver	Bronze
Men's	Yugoslavia; Abaz Arslanagić; Petar Fajfrić; Hrvoje Horvat; Milorad Karalić; Đorđe Lavrnić; Milan Lazarević; Zdravko Miljak; Slobodan Mišković; Branislav Pokrajac; Nebojša Popović; Miroslav Pribanić; Albin Vidović; Zoran Živković; Zdenko Zorko	Czechoslovakia; Ladislav Beneš; František Brůna; Vladimír Haber; Vladimír Jarý; Jiří Kavan; Arnošt Klimčík; Jaroslav Konečný; František Králík; Jindřich Krepindl; Vincent Lafko; Andrej Lukošík; Pavel Mikeš; Petr Pospíšil; Ivan Satrapa; Zdeněk Škára; Jaroslav Škarvan	Romania; Ştefan Birtalan; Adrian Cosma; Marin Dan; Alexandru Dincă; Cristian Gaţu; Gheorghe Gruia; Roland Gunesch; Gabriel Kicsid; Ghiţă Licu; Cornel Penu; Valentin Samungi; Simion Schöbel; Werner Stöckl; Constantin Tudosie; Radu Voina

== Judo ==
=== Medal table ===
* Host nation (West Germany)

Rank	Nation	Gold	Silver	Bronze	Total
1	Japan	3	0	1	4
2	Netherlands	2	0	0	2
3	Soviet Union	1	1	2	4
4	Great Britain	0	1	2	3
5	West Germany*	0	1	1	2
6	Poland	0	1	0	1
6	South Korea	0	1	0	1
8	France	0	0	3	3
9	Brazil	0	0	1	1
9	East Germany	0	0	1	1
9	North Korea	0	0	1	1
Totals (11 entries)		6	5	12	23

=== Medalists ===
Games	Gold	Silver	Bronze
Lightweight; 63 kg	Takao Kawaguchi; Japan	vacant	Kim Yong-ik; North Korea
Lightweight; 63 kg	Takao Kawaguchi; Japan	vacant	Jean-Jacques Mounier; France
Half middleweight 70 kg	Toyokazu Nomura; Japan	Antoni Zajkowski; Poland	Dietmar Hötger; East Germany
Half middleweight 70 kg	Toyokazu Nomura; Japan	Antoni Zajkowski; Poland	Anatoliy Novikov; Soviet Union
Middleweight; 80 kg	Shinobu Sekine; Japan	Oh Seung-lip; South Korea	Jean-Paul Coche; France
Middleweight; 80 kg	Shinobu Sekine; Japan	Oh Seung-lip; South Korea	Brian Jacks; Great Britain
Half-heavyweight; 93 kg	Shota Chochishvili; Soviet Union	David Starbrook; Great Britain	Paul Barth; West Germany
Half-heavyweight; 93 kg	Shota Chochishvili; Soviet Union	David Starbrook; Great Britain	Chiaki Ishii; Brazil
Heavyweight +93 kg	Wim Ruska; Netherlands	Klaus Glahn; West Germany	Motoki Nishimura; Japan
Heavyweight +93 kg	Wim Ruska; Netherlands	Klaus Glahn; West Germany	Givi Onashvili; Soviet Union
Open category	Wim Ruska; Netherlands	Vitali Kuznetsov; Soviet Union	Jean-Claude Brondani; France
Open category	Wim Ruska; Netherlands	Vitali Kuznetsov; Soviet Union	Angelo Parisi; Great Britain

== Modern pentathlon ==
=== Medal table ===
Rank	Nation	Gold	Silver	Bronze	Total
1	Soviet Union	1	1	1	3
2	Hungary	1	1	0	2
3	Finland	0	0	1	1
Totals (3 entries)		2	2	2	6

=== Medalists ===
Event	Gold	Silver	Bronze
Individual	András Balczó; Hungary	Boris Onishchenko; Soviet Union	Pavel Lednyov; Soviet Union
Team	Soviet Union; Boris Onishchenko; Pavel Lednyov; Vladimir Shmelyov	Hungary; András Balczó; Zsigmond Villányi; Pál Bakó	Finland; Risto Hurme; Veikko Salminen; Martti Ketelä

== Rowing ==
=== Medal table ===
* Host nation (West Germany)

Rank	Nation	Gold	Silver	Bronze	Total
1	East Germany	3	1	3	7
2	Soviet Union	2	0	0	2
3	New Zealand	1	1	0	2
4	West Germany*	1	0	1	2
5	Czechoslovakia	0	1	1	2
6	Argentina	0	1	0	1
6	Norway	0	1	0	1
6	Switzerland	0	1	0	1
6	United States	0	1	0	1
10	Netherlands	0	0	1	1
10	Romania	0	0	1	1
Totals (11 entries)		7	7	7	21

=== Medalists ===
Games	Gold	Silver	Bronze
Single sculls	Yury Malyshev; Soviet Union	Alberto Demiddi; Argentina	Wolfgang Güldenpfennig; East Germany
Double sculls	Soviet Union; Aleksandr Timoshinin; Gennadi Korshikov	Norway; Frank Hansen; Svein Thøgersen	East Germany; Joachim Böhmer; Uli Schmied
Coxless pair	East Germany; Siegfried Brietzke; Wolfgang Mager	Switzerland; Heinrich Fischer; Alfred Bachmann	Netherlands; Roel Luynenburg; Ruud Stokvis
Coxed pair	East Germany; Wolfgang Gunkel; Jörg Lucke; Klaus-Dieter Neubert	Czechoslovakia; Oldřich Svojanovský; Pavel Svojanovský; Vladimír Petříček	Romania; Ștefan Tudor; Petre Ceapura; Ladislau Lovrenschi
Coxless four	East Germany; Frank Forberger; Frank Rühle; Dieter Grahn; Dieter Schubert	New Zealand; Dick Tonks; Dudley Storey; Ross Collinge; Noel Mills	West Germany; Joachim Ehrig; Peter Funnekötter; Franz Held; Wolfgang Plottke
Coxed four	West Germany; Peter Berger; Hans-Johann Färber; Gerhard Auer; Alois Bierl; Uwe Benter	East Germany; Dietrich Zander; Reinhard Gust; Eckhard Martens; Rolf Jobst; Klaus-Dieter Ludwig	Czechoslovakia; Otakar Mareček; Karel Neffe; Vladimír Jánoš; František Provazník; Vladimír Petříček
Eight	New Zealand; Tony Hurt; Wybo Veldman; Dick Joyce; John Hunter; Lindsay Wilson; Joe Earl; Trevor Coker; Gary Robertson; Simon Dickie	United States; Lawrence Terry; Franklin Hobbs; Pete Raymond; Tim Mickelson; Gene Clapp; Bill Hobbs; Cleve Livingston; Mike Livingston; Paul Hoffman	East Germany; Hans-Joachim Borzym; Jörg Landvoigt; Harold Dimke; Manfred Schneider; Hartmut Schreiber; Manfred Schmorde; Bernd Landvoigt; Heinrich Mederow; Dietmar Schwarz

== Sailing ==
=== Medal table ===
* Host nation (West Germany)

Rank	Nation	Gold	Silver	Bronze	Total
1	Australia	2	0	0	2
2	France	1	1	0	2
2	Great Britain	1	1	0	2
4	United States	1	0	2	3
5	Soviet Union	1	0	1	2
6	Sweden	0	2	0	2
7	East Germany	0	1	0	1
7	Greece	0	1	0	1
9	West Germany*	0	0	2	2
10	Canada	0	0	1	1
Totals (10 entries)		6	6	6	18

=== Medalists ===
Event	Gold	Silver	Bronze
Finn	Serge Maury; France	Ilias Hatzipavlis; Greece	Viktor Potapov; Soviet Union
Flying Dutchman	Great Britain; Rodney Pattisson; Christopher Davies	France; Yves Pajot; Marc Pajot	West Germany; Ulli Libor; Peter Naumann
Tempest	Soviet Union; Valentin Mankin; Vitali Dyrdyra	Great Britain; Alan Warren; David Hunt	United States; Glen Foster; Peter Dean
Star	Australia; David Forbes; John Anderson	Sweden; Pelle Petterson; Stellan Westerdahl	West Germany; Wilhelm Kuhweide; Karsten Meyer
Soling	United States; Harry Melges; William Allen; William Bentsen	Sweden; Stig Wennerström; Bo Knape; Stefan Krook	Canada; David Miller; Paul Côté; John Ekels
Dragon	Australia; John Cuneo; Thomas Anderson; John Shaw	East Germany; Paul Borowski; Karl-Heinz Thun; Konrad Weichert	United States; Donald Cohan; Charles Horter; John Marshall

== Shooting ==
=== Medal table ===
* Host nation (West Germany)

Rank	Nation	Gold	Silver	Bronze	Total
1	United States	2	2	0	4
2	Soviet Union	1	2	1	4
3	Italy	1	0	1	2
4	North Korea	1	0	0	1
4	Poland	1	0	0	1
4	Sweden	1	0	0	1
4	West Germany*	1	0	0	1
8	Romania	0	1	1	2
9	Colombia	0	1	0	1
9	Czechoslovakia	0	1	0	1
9	France	0	1	0	1
12	East Germany	0	0	2	2
13	Austria	0	0	1	1
13	Great Britain	0	0	1	1
13	Hungary	0	0	1	1
Totals (15 entries)		8	8	8	24

=== Medalists ===
Event	Gold	Silver	Bronze
50 m pistol	Ragnar Skanåker; Sweden	Dan Iuga; Romania	Rudolf Dollinger; Austria
25 m rapid fire pistol	Józef Zapędzki; Poland	Ladislav Falta; Czechoslovakia	Viktor Torshin; Soviet Union
50 m running target	Yakov Zheleznyak; Soviet Union	Helmut Bellingrodt; Colombia	John Kynoch; Great Britain
50 m rifle prone	Ri Ho-jun; North Korea	Vic Auer; United States	Nicolae Rotaru; Romania
50 m rifle three positions	John Writer; United States	Lanny Bassham; United States	Werner Lippoldt; East Germany
300 m free rifle three positions	Lones Wigger; United States	Boris Melnik; Soviet Union	Lajos Papp; Hungary
Skeet	Konrad Wirnhier; West Germany	Yevgeni Petrov; Soviet Union	Michael Buchheim; East Germany
Trap	Angelo Scalzone; Italy	Michel Carrega; France	Silvano Basagni; Italy

== Swimming ==
=== Medal table ===
* Host nation (West Germany)

Rank	Nation	Gold	Silver	Bronze	Total
1	United States	17	14	12	43
2	Australia	6	2	2	10
3	East Germany	2	5	2	9
4	Japan	2	0	1	3
5	Sweden	2	0	0	2
6	Soviet Union	0	2	3	5
7	Canada	0	2	2	4
8	West Germany*	0	1	3	4
9	Hungary	0	1	2	3
9	Italy	0	1	2	3
11	Great Britain	0	1	0	1
Totals (11 entries)		29	29	29	87

=== Men's events ===
Games	Gold		Silver		Bronze	
100 m freestyle	Mark Spitz; United States	51.22 (WR)	Jerry Heidenreich; United States	51.65	Vladimir Bure; Soviet Union	51.77
200 m freestyle	Mark Spitz; United States	1:52.78 (WR)	Steve Genter; United States	1:53.73	Werner Lampe; West Germany	1:53.99
400 m freestyle	Brad Cooper; Australia	4:00.27 (OR)	Steve Genter; United States	4:01.94	Tom McBreen; United States	4:02.64
1500 m freestyle	Mike Burton; United States	15:52.58 (WR)	Graham Windeatt; Australia	15:58.48	Doug Northway; United States	16:09.25
100 m backstroke	Roland Matthes; East Germany	56.58 (OR)	Mike Stamm; United States	57.70	John Murphy; United States	58.35
200 m backstroke	Roland Matthes; East Germany	2:02.82 (WR)	Mike Stamm; United States	2:04.09	Mitch Ivey; United States	2:04.33
100 m breaststroke	Nobutaka Taguchi; Japan	1:04.94 (WR)	Tom Bruce; United States	1:05.43	John Hencken; United States	1:05.61
200 m breaststroke	John Hencken; United States	2:21.55 (WR)	David Wilkie; Great Britain	2:23.67	Nobutaka Taguchi; Japan	2:23.88
100 m butterfly	Mark Spitz; United States	54.27 (WR)	Bruce Robertson; Canada	55.56	Jerry Heidenreich; United States	55.74
200 m butterfly	Mark Spitz; United States	2:00.70 (WR)	Gary Hall, Sr. United States	2:02.86	Robin Backhaus; United States	2:03.23
200 m individual medley	Gunnar Larsson; Sweden	2:07.17 (WR)	Tim McKee; United States	2:08.37	Steve Furniss; United States	2:08.45
400 m individual medley	Gunnar Larsson; Sweden	4:31.98 (OR)	Tim McKee; United States	4:31.98 (OR)	András Hargitay; Hungary	4:32.70
4 × 100 m freestyle relay	United States; David Edgar; John Murphy; Jerry Heidenreich; Mark Spitz	3:26.42 (WR)	Soviet Union; Vladimir Bure; Viktor Mazanov; Viktor Aboimov; Igor Grivennikov	3:29.72	East Germany; Roland Matthes; Wilfried Hartung; Peter Bruch; Lutz Unger	3:32.42
4 × 200 m freestyle relay	United States; John Kinsella; Fred Tyler; Steve Genter; Mark Spitz	7:35.78 (WR)	West Germany; Klaus Steinbach; Werner Lampe; Hans Vosseler; Hans Fassnacht	7:41.69	Soviet Union; Igor Grivennikov; Viktor Mazanov; Georgi Kulikov; Vladimir Bure	7:45.76
4 × 100 m medley relay	United States; Mike Stamm; Tom Bruce; Mark Spitz; Jerry Heidenreich	3:48.16 (WR)	East Germany; Roland Matthes; Klaus Katzur; Hartmut Flöckner; Lutz Unger	3:52.26	Canada; Erik Fish; William Mahony; Bruce Robertson; Robert Kasting	3:53.26

=== Women's events ===
Games	Gold		Silver		Bronze	
100 m freestyle	Sandy Neilson; United States	58.59 (OR)	Shirley Babashoff; United States	59.02	Shane Gould; Australia	59.06
200 m freestyle	Shane Gould; Australia	2:03.56 (WR)	Shirley Babashoff; United States	2:04.33	Keena Rothhammer; United States	2:04.92
400 m freestyle	Shane Gould; Australia	4:19.04 (WR)	Novella Calligaris; Italy	4:22.44	Gudrun Wegner; East Germany	4:23.11
800 m freestyle	Keena Rothhammer; United States	8:53.68 (WR)	Shane Gould; Australia	8:56.39	Novella Calligaris; Italy	8:57.46
100 m backstroke	Melissa Belote; United States	1:05.78 (OR)	Andrea Gyarmati; Hungary	1:06.26	Susie Atwood; United States	1:06.34
200 m backstroke	Melissa Belote; United States	2:19.19 (WR)	Susie Atwood; United States	2:20.38	Donna Gurr; Canada	2:23.22
100 m breaststroke	Cathy Carr; United States	1:13.58 (WR)	Galina Prozumenshchikova; Soviet Union	1:14.99	Beverley Whitfield; Australia	1:15.73
200 m breaststroke	Beverley Whitfield; Australia	2:41.05 (OR)	Dana Schoenfield; United States	2:42.05	Galina Prozumenshchikova; Soviet Union	2:42.36
100 m butterfly	Mayumi Aoki; Japan	1:03.34 (WR)	Roswitha Beier; East Germany	1:03.61	Andrea Gyarmati; Hungary	1:03.73
200 m butterfly	Karen Moe; United States	2:15.57 (WR)	Lynn Colella; United States	2:16.34	Ellie Daniel; United States	2:16.74
200 m individual medley	Shane Gould; Australia	2:23.07 (WR)	Kornelia Ender; East Germany	2:23.59	Lynn Vidali; United States	2:24.06
400 m individual medley	Gail Neall; Australia	5:02.97 (WR)	Leslie Cliff; Canada	5:03.57	Novella Calligaris; Italy	5:03.99
4 × 100 m freestyle relay	United States; Shirley Babashoff; Jane Barkman; Jenny Kemp; Sandy Neilson	3:55.19 (WR)	East Germany; Andrea Eife; Kornelia Ender; Elke Sehmisch; Gabriele Wetzko	3:55.55	West Germany; Gudrun Beckmann; Heidemarie Reineck; Angela Steinbach; Jutta Weber	3:57.93
4 × 100 m medley relay	United States; Melissa Belote; Cathy Carr; Deena Deardurff; Sandy Neilson	4:20.75 (WR)	East Germany; Christine Herbst; Renate Vogel; Roswitha Beier; Kornelia Ender	4:24.91	West Germany; Gudrun Beckmann; Vreni Eberle; Silke Pielen; Heidemarie Reineck	4:26.46

== Volleyball ==
=== Medal table ===
Rank	Nation	Gold	Silver	Bronze	Total
1	Japan	1	1	0	2
2	Soviet Union	1	0	1	2
3	East Germany	0	1	0	1
4	North Korea	0	0	1	1
Totals (4 entries)		2	2	2	6

=== Medalists ===
Event	Gold	Silver	Bronze
Men's	Japan; Masayuki Minami; Katsutoshi Nekoda; Yūzo Nakamura; Tetsuo Nishimoto; Kenji Kimura; Yoshihide Fukao; Yasuhiro Noguchi; Jungo Morita; Tadayoshi Yokota; Seiji Oko; Tetsuo Satō; Kenji Shimaoka	East Germany; Horst Peter; Horst Hagen; Siegfried Schneider; Wolfgang Löwe; Rainer Tscharke; Eckehard Pietzsch; Arnold Schulz; Wolfgang Maibohm; Wolfgang Weise; Jürgen Maune; Rudi Schumann; Wolfgang Webner	Soviet Union; Yuriy Poyarkov; Valeri Kravchenko; Yefim Chulak; Yevhen Lapinsky; Vladimir Putyatov; Viktor Borshch; Vladimir Patkin; Leonid Zayko; Aleksandr Saprykin; Yuri Starunsky; Vyacheslav Domani; Vladimir Kondra
Women's	Soviet Union; Lyudmila Buldakova; Lyubov Tyurina; Vera Galushka-Duyunova; Lyudmila Borozna; Tatyana Sarycheva; Nina Smoleyeva; Tatyana Ponyayeva-Tretyakova; Rosa Salikhova; Inna Ryskal; Nataliya Kudreva; Galina Leontyeva; Tatyana Gonobobleva	Japan; Katsumi Matsumura; Noriko Yamashita; Toyoko Iwahara; Takako Iida; Sumie Oinuma; Makiko Furukawa; Keiko Hama; Seiko Shimakage; Yaeko Yamazaki; Michiko Shiokawa; Mariko Okamoto; Takako Shirai	North Korea; Ryom Chun-ja; Kim Su-dae; Ri Chun-ok; Paek Myong-suk; Jong Ok-jin; Kim Myong-suk; Jang Ok-rim; Kim Yeun-ja; Kim Zung-bok; Kang Ok-sun; Hwang He-Suk

== Water polo ==
=== Medal table ===
Rank	Nation	Gold	Silver	Bronze	Total
1	Soviet Union	1	0	0	1
2	Hungary	0	1	0	1
3	United States	0	0	1	1
Totals (3 entries)		1	1	1	3

=== Medalists ===
Event	Gold	Silver	Bronze
Men's	Soviet Union; Anatoli Akimov; Aleksei Barkalov; Vadim Gulyaev; Aleksandr Dolgushin; Aleksandr Dreval; Vladimir Shmudski; Aleksandr Kabanov; Leonid Osipov; Viacheslav Sobtschenko; Nikolai Melnikov; Aleksandr Schidlovski	Hungary; András Bodnár; Tibor Cservenyák; István Görgényi; Tamás Faragó; Zoltán Kásás; Ferenc Konrád; István Magas; Dénes Pócsik; László Sárosi; Endre Molnár; István Szívós, Jr.	United States; Peter Asch; Steven Barnett; Bruce Bradley; Stanley Cole; James Ferguson; Eric Lindroth; John Parker; Gary Sheerer; James Slatton; Russell Webb; Barry Weitzenberg

== Weightlifting ==
=== Medal table ===
* Host nation (West Germany)

Rank	Nation	Gold	Silver	Bronze	Total
1	Bulgaria	3	3	0	6
2	Soviet Union	3	1	1	5
3	Hungary	1	1	3	5
4	Poland	1	1	1	3
5	Norway	1	0	0	1
6	Iran	0	1	0	1
6	Lebanon	0	1	0	1
6	West Germany*	0	1	0	1
9	East Germany	0	0	2	2
10	Italy	0	0	1	1
10	Sweden	0	0	1	1
Totals (11 entries)		9	9	9	27

=== Medalists ===
Games	Gold	Silver	Bronze
52 kg	Zygmunt Smalcerz; Poland	Lajos Szűcs; Hungary	Sándor Holczreiter; Hungary
56 kg	Imre Földi; Hungary	Mohammad Nassiri; Iran	Gennadi Chetin; Soviet Union
60 kg	Norair Nurikyan; Bulgaria	Dito Shanidze; Soviet Union	János Benedek; Hungary
67.5 kg	Mukharby Kirzhinov; Soviet Union	Mladen Kutchev; Bulgaria	Zbigniew Kaczmarek; Poland
75 kg	Yordan Bikov; Bulgaria	Mohamed Traboulsi; Lebanon	Anselmo Silvino; Italy
82.5 kg	Leif Jenssen; Norway	Norbert Ozimek; Poland	György Horváth; Hungary
90 kg	Andon Nikolov; Bulgaria	Atanas Shopov; Bulgaria	Hans Bettembourg; Sweden
110 kg	Jaan Talts; Soviet Union	Aleksandr Kraichev; Bulgaria	Stefan Grützner; East Germany
+110 kg	Vasiliy Alekseyev; Soviet Union	Rudolf Mang; West Germany	Gerd Bonk; East Germany

== Wrestling ==
=== Medal table ===
* Host nation (West Germany)

Rank	Nation	Gold	Silver	Bronze	Total
1	Soviet Union	9	4	1	14
2	United States	3	2	1	6
3	Bulgaria	2	4	2	8
4	Japan	2	2	0	4
5	Romania	2	0	2	4
6	Hungary	1	0	4	5
7	Czechoslovakia	1	0	0	1
8	Iran	0	1	1	2
8	Sweden	0	1	1	2
8	West Germany*	0	1	1	2
8	Yugoslavia	0	1	1	2
12	East Germany	0	1	0	1
12	Greece	0	1	0	1
12	Mongolia	0	1	0	1
12	Turkey	0	1	0	1
16	Italy	0	0	2	2
16	Poland	0	0	2	2
18	Finland	0	0	1	1
18	North Korea	0	0	1	1
Totals (19 entries)		20	20	20	60

=== Freestyle ===
Games	Gold	Silver	Bronze
48 kg	Roman Dmitriyev; Soviet Union	Ognyan Nikolov; Bulgaria	Ebrahim Javadi; Iran
52 kg	Kiyomi Kato; Japan	Arsen Alakhverdiyev; Soviet Union	Kim Gwong-Hyong; North Korea
57 kg	Hideaki Yanagida; Japan	Richard Sanders; United States	László Klinga; Hungary
62 kg	Zagalav Abdulbekov; Soviet Union	Vehbi Akdağ; Turkey	Ivan Krastev; Bulgaria
68 kg	Dan Gable; United States	Kikuo Wada; Japan	Ruslan Ashuraliyev; Soviet Union
74 kg	Wayne Wells; United States	Jan Karlsson; Sweden	Adolf Seger; West Germany
82 kg	Levan Tediashvili; Soviet Union	John Peterson; United States	Vasile Iorga; Romania
90 kg	Ben Peterson; United States	Gennadi Strakhov; Soviet Union	Károly Bajkó; Hungary
100 kg	Ivan Yarygin; Soviet Union	Khorloogiin Bayanmönkh; Mongolia	József Csatári; Hungary
+100 kg	Aleksandr Medved; Soviet Union	Osman Duraliev; Bulgaria	Chris Taylor; United States

=== Greco-Roman ===
Games	Gold	Silver	Bronze
48 kg	Gheorghe Berceanu; Romania	Rahim Aliabadi; Iran	Stefan Angelov; Bulgaria
52 kg	Petar Kirov; Bulgaria	Koichiro Hirayama; Japan	Giuseppe Bognanni; Italy
57 kg	Rustam Kazakov; Soviet Union	Hans-Jürgen Veil; West Germany	Risto Björlin; Finland
62 kg	Georgi Markov; Bulgaria	Heinz-Helmut Wehling; East Germany	Kazimierz Lipień; Poland
68 kg	Shamil Khisamutdinov; Soviet Union	Stoyan Apostolov; Bulgaria	Gian Matteo Ranzi; Italy
74 kg	Vítězslav Mácha; Czechoslovakia	Petros Galaktopoulos; Greece	Jan Karlsson; Sweden
82 kg	Csaba Hegedűs; Hungary	Anatoly Nazarenko; Soviet Union	Milan Nenadić; Yugoslavia
90 kg	Valery Rezantsev; Soviet Union	Josip Čorak; Yugoslavia	Czesław Kwieciński; Poland
100 kg	Nicolae Martinescu; Romania	Nikolay Yakovenko; Soviet Union	Ferenc Kiss; Hungary
+100 kg	Anatoly Roshchin; Soviet Union	Aleksandar Tomov; Bulgaria	Victor Dolipschi; Romania
