= Volleyball at the 1972 Summer Olympics – Women's tournament =

Women's volleyball at the Games of the XX Olympiad
- Venue: Volleyball Hall
- Date: 27 August – 7 September
- Competitors: 93 from 8 nations

Medalists
1st place, gold medalist(s)		Soviet Union (2nd title)
2nd place, silver medalist(s)		Japan
3rd place, bronze medalist(s)		North Korea

The 1972 Women's Olympic Volleyball Tournament was the 3rd edition of the event, organized by the world's governing body, the FIVB in conjunction with the IOC. It was held in Munich, West Germany from 27 August to 7 September 1972.

== Qualification ==
Qualifiers	Date	Host	Vacancies	Qualified
Host country	26 April 1966	(Italy) Rome	1	West Germany
1968 Olympic Games	13–26 October 1968	Mexico City	1	Soviet Union
1970 World Championship	22 Sep. – 2 Oct. 1970	(Bulgaria) Varna	3	Japan; North Korea; Hungary
1970 Asian Games	10 - 19 Oct. 1970	(Thailand) Bangkok	1	South Korea*
1971 European Championship	23 Sep. – 1 Oct. 1971	(Italy) Reggio Emilia	1	Czechoslovakia
1971 Pan American Games	31 July – 11 Aug. 1971	(Colombia) Cali	1	Cuba
Total			8	

* South Korea qualified as next best Asian team as Japan is already qualified.

== Format ==
The tournament was played in two different stages. In the Preliminary round (first stage), the eight participants were divided into two pools of four teams. A single round-robin format was played within each pool to determine the teams position in the pool. The Final round (second stage) was played in a single elimination format, where the preliminary round two highest ranked teams in each group advanced to the semifinals and the two lowest ranked teams advanced to the 5th–8th place semifinals.

== Pools composition ==
Pool A	Pool B
West Germany	Japan
Hungary	Czechoslovakia
Soviet Union	North Korea
South Korea	Cuba

== Venue ==
- Volleyball Hall, Munich, West Germany

== Preliminary round ==
=== Pool A ===
Pos	Team	Pld	W	L	Pts	SW	SL	SR	SPW	SPL	SPR	Qualification
1	Soviet Union	3	3	0	6	9	2	4.500	159	96	1.656	1st–4th semifinals
2	South Korea	3	2	1	5	7	3	2.333	127	99	1.283	1st–4th semifinals
3	Hungary	3	1	2	4	4	6	0.667	114	131	0.870	5th–8th semifinals
4	West Germany	3	0	3	3	0	9	0.000	61	135	0.452	5th–8th semifinals

Date		Score		Set 1	Set 2	Set 3	Set 4	Set 5	Total	Report
27 Aug	Hungary	3–0	West Germany	15–8	15–11	15–9			45–28	Report
27 Aug	South Korea	1–3	Soviet Union	15–11	8–15	7–15	7–15		37–56	Report
29 Aug	Hungary	0–3	South Korea	7–15	13–15	11–15			31–45	Report
29 Aug	Soviet Union	3–0	West Germany	15–5	15–7	15–9			45–21	Report
31 Aug	Hungary	1–3	Soviet Union	12–15	2–15	15–13	9–15		38–58	Report
31 Aug	South Korea	3–0	West Germany	15–2	15–8	15–2			45–12	Report

=== Pool B ===
Pos	Team	Pld	W	L	Pts	SW	SL	SR	SPW	SPL	SPR	Qualification
1	Japan	3	3	0	6	9	0	MAX	136	56	2.429	1st–4th semifinals
2	North Korea	3	2	1	5	6	3	2.000	119	76	1.566	1st–4th semifinals
3	Cuba	3	1	2	4	3	7	0.429	73	140	0.521	5th–8th semifinals
4	Czechoslovakia	3	0	3	3	1	9	0.111	85	141	0.603	5th–8th semifinals

Date		Score		Set 1	Set 2	Set 3	Set 4	Set 5	Total	Report
28 Aug	Cuba	0–3	North Korea	1–15	8–15	3–15			12–45	Report
28 Aug	Japan	3–0	Czechoslovakia	15–1	15–7	15–9			45–17	Report
30 Aug	Cuba	0–3	Japan	2–15	3–15	5–15			10–45	Report
30 Aug	Czechoslovakia	0–3	North Korea	3–15	7–15	8–15			18–45	Report
1 Sep	Cuba	3–1	Czechoslovakia	6–15	15–12	15–10	15–13		51–50	Report
1 Sep	Japan	3–0	North Korea	15–3	15–2	16–14			46–19	Report

== Final round ==
=== 5th–8th place ===
5th–8th places
2 September
West Germany	0
Cuba	3
2 September
Hungary	3
Czechoslovakia	2

5th place
7 September
Cuba	2
Hungary	3
7th place
7 September
Czechoslovakia	3
West Germany	0

==== 5th–8th place semifinals ====
Date		Score		Set 1	Set 2	Set 3	Set 4	Set 5	Total	Report
2 Sep	West Germany	0–3	Cuba	11–15	13–15	15–17			39–47	Report
2 Sep	Hungary	3–2	Czechoslovakia	15–9	13–15	11–15	15–10	15–11	69–60	Report

==== 7th place match ====
Date		Score		Set 1	Set 2	Set 3	Set 4	Set 5	Total	Report
7 Sep	Czechoslovakia	3–0	West Germany	15–13	15–4	16–14			46–31	Report

==== 5th place match ====
Date		Score		Set 1	Set 2	Set 3	Set 4	Set 5	Total	Report
7 Sep	Cuba	2–3	Hungary	15–13	16–14	14–16	5–15	11–15	61–73	Report

=== Final ===
Semifinals
3 September
South Korea	0
Japan	3
3 September
Soviet Union	3
North Korea	1

Gold medal match
7 September
Japan	2
Soviet Union	3
Bronze medal match
7 September
South Korea	0
North Korea	3

==== Semifinals ====
Date		Score		Set 1	Set 2	Set 3	Set 4	Set 5	Total	Report
3 Sep	South Korea	0–3	Japan	3–15	5–15	9–15			17–45	Report
3 Sep	Soviet Union	3–1	North Korea	15–10	16–14	7–15	15–8		53–47	Report

==== Bronze medal match ====
Date		Score		Set 1	Set 2	Set 3	Set 4	Set 5	Total	Report
7 Sep	South Korea	0–3	North Korea	7–15	9–15	9–15			25–45	Report

==== Gold medal match ====
Date		Score		Set 1	Set 2	Set 3	Set 4	Set 5	Total	Report
7 Sep	Japan	2–3	Soviet Union	11–15	15–4	11–15	15–9	11–15	63–58	Report

== Final standing ==
Rank	Team
1st place, gold medalist(s)	Soviet Union
2nd place, silver medalist(s)	Japan
3rd place, bronze medalist(s)	North Korea
4	South Korea
5	Hungary
6	Cuba
7	Czechoslovakia
8	West Germany

1972 Women's Olympic champions

Soviet Union
2nd title

12-woman roster
Vera Galushka-Duyunova, Tatyana Ponyayeva-Tretyakova, Nina Smoleeva, Roza Salikhova, Lyudmila Buldakova (c), Tatyana Gonobobleva, Lyubov Turina, Galina Leontyeva, Inna Ryskal, Tatyana Sarycheva, Lyudmila Borozna, Nataliya Kudreva
Head coach
Givi Akhvlediani

== Medalists ==
Gold	Silver	Bronze
Soviet Union Vera Galushka-Duyunova; Tatyana Ponyayeva-Tretyakova; Nina Smoleeva; Roza Salikhova; Lyudmila Buldakova (c); Tatyana Gonobobleva; Lyubov Turina; Galina Leontyeva; Inna Ryskal; Tatyana Sarycheva; Lyudmila Borozna; Nataliya Kudreva Head coach: Givi Akhvlediani	Japan Sumie Oinuma; Noriko Yamashita; Seiko Shimakage; Makiko Furukawa; Takako Iida; Katsumi Matsumura; Michiko Shiokawa; Takako Shirai; Mariko Okamoto; Keiko Hama; Yaeko Yamazaki; Toyoko Iwahara Head coach: Kōji Kojima	North Korea Ri Chun-Ok; Kim Myong-Suk; Kim Zung-Bok; Kang Ok-Sun; Kim Yeun-Ja; Hwang He-Suk; Jang Ok-Rim; Paek Myong-Suk; Ryom Chun-Ja; Kim Su-Dae; Jong Ok-Jin Head coach:
