= North Korea at the Olympics =

- IOC code: PRK
- NOC: Olympic Committee of the Democratic People's Republic of Korea
- Medals Ranked 47th: Gold 16 Silver 19 Bronze 28 Total 63

Summer appearances
- 1972; 1976; 1980; 1984–1988; 1992; 1996; 2000; 2004; 2008; 2012; 2016; 2020; 2024; 2028

Winter appearances
- 1964; 1968; 1972; 1976–1980; 1984; 1988; 1992; 1994; 1998; 2002; 2006; 2010; 2014; 2018; 2022–2026

Other related appearances
- Korea (2018)

The Democratic People's Republic of Korea (commonly known as North Korea) first participated at the Olympic Games in 1964. The National Olympic Committee for North Korea is the Olympic Committee of the Democratic People's Republic of Korea, and was created in 1953 and recognized in 1957. The Korean Unification Flag has occasionally been flown by North Korea alongside South Korea at the Olympics, and at the 2018 Winter Olympics, North Korean and South Korean athletes unified to form the Korea women's national ice hockey team.

== History ==
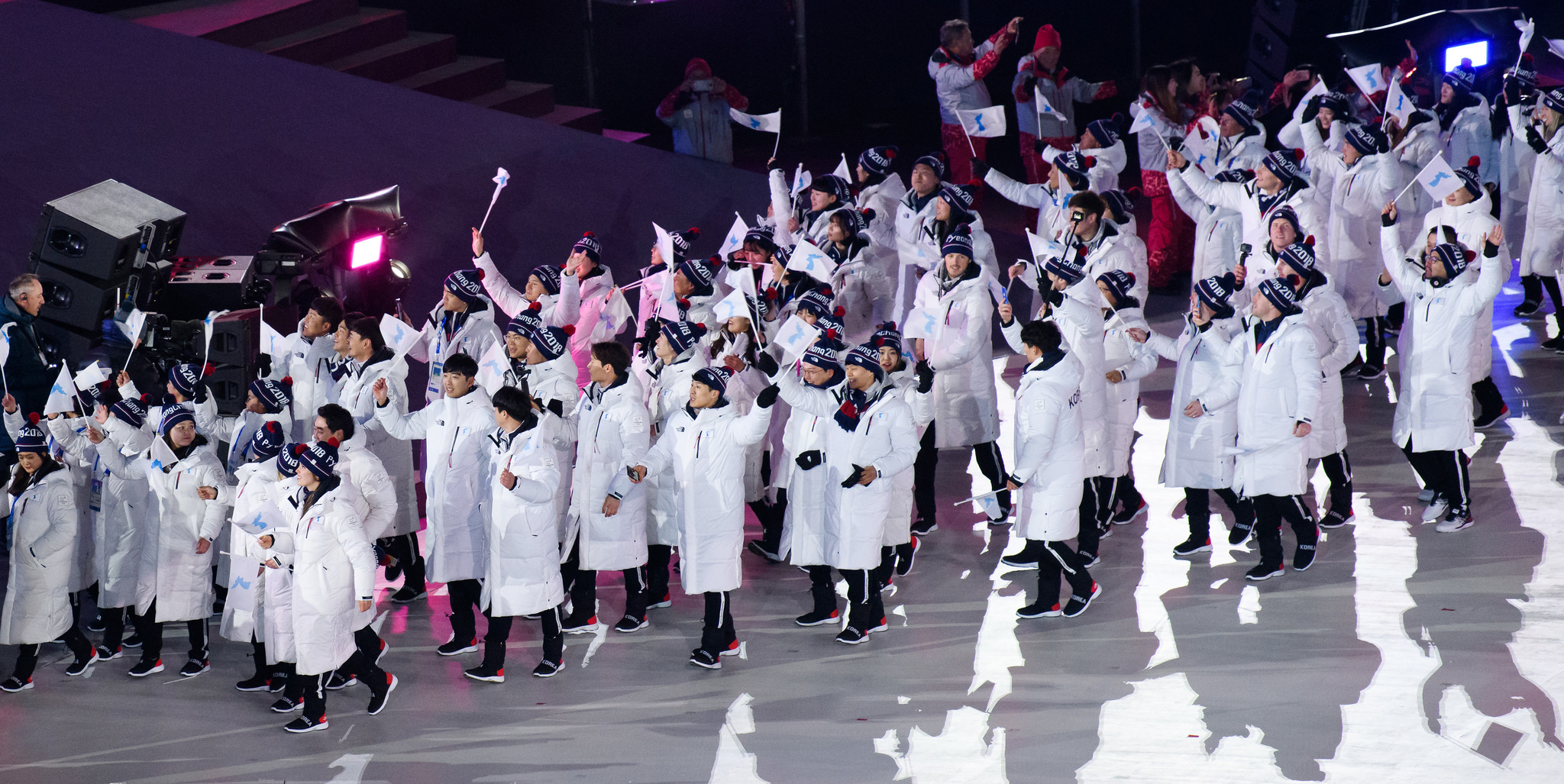
The unified Korean team at the 2018 Winter Olympics opening ceremony

North Korea's first Olympic appearance was in the 1964 Winter Olympics at Innsbruck, Austria. The nation participated in its first Summer Olympic Games eight years later at the 1972 Munich Olympics. Since then, the nation has appeared in every Summer Games, except when North Korea joined the Soviet-led boycott of the 1984 Summer Olympics, when they led the 1988 Summer Olympics boycott in Seoul, South Korea, and in 2020, citing COVID-19 concerns.

North Korea's attendance at the Winter Games has been sporadic; eight of the last thirteen Games have included a North Korean team.

During the 1998-2007 Sunshine Policy era, North Korea and South Korea symbolically marched as one team at the opening ceremonies of the 2000, 2004, and 2006 Olympics, but competed separately.

North Korea sent 22 athletes to compete in five sports at the 2018 Winter Olympics in Pyeongchang, South Korea. As in 2000 and 2004, North and South Korean athletes marched together at the opening ceremonies. A unified women's ice hockey team included players from both North and South Korea. North Korean athletes also competed in alpine skiing, figure skating, short track speed skating and cross-country skiing.

Alongside the 22 athletes, North Korea sent a delegation of 400 supporters to the 2018 games. This delegation, led by North Korea's ceremonial head of state Kim Yong-nam, included cheerleaders, taekwondo practitioners and an orchestra.

North Korean athletes have won a total of 63 medals, two of which were won at the Winter Games. Government funding plays a major role in Korea's success. Elite athletes often enjoy highly developed facilities and luxurious lifestyles, compared with their peers.

In 2018, the United Nations, due to conflicts, rejected an exemption to sanctions for sporting equipment to help athletes prepare for the 2020 Summer Olympics being sent to North Korea.

On 6 April 2021, North Korea announced it would not participate in the 2020 Summer Olympics due to COVID-19 concerns. Because the Olympic Charter mandates members' participation, the International Olympic Committee suspended North Korea from its activities until the end of 2022, thus prohibiting the country from participating in the 2022 Winter Olympics in Beijing.

== Timeline of participation ==
Olympic Year/s	Teams		
1912–1936	Japan		
1948–1960		South Korea	Japan
1964 W	North Korea (NKO)	South Korea	Japan
1964 S–1968		South Korea	Japan
1972–present	North Korea (PRK)	South Korea	Japan

== Medal tables ==
=== Medals by Summer Games ===
Games	Athletes	Gold	Silver	Bronze	Total	Rank
1912–1936	as part of Japan					
1948–1968	did not participate					
(West Germany) 1972 Munich	37	1	1	3	5	22
(Canada) 1976 Montreal	38	1	1	0	2	21
(Soviet Union) 1980 Moscow	57	0	3	2	5	26
(United States) 1984 Los Angeles	boycotted					
(South Korea) 1988 Seoul	boycotted					
(Spain) 1992 Barcelona	64	4	0	5	9	16
(United States) 1996 Atlanta	24	2	1	2	5	33
(Australia) 2000 Sydney	31	0	1	3	4	60
(Greece) 2004 Athens	36	0	4	1	5	57
(China) 2008 Beijing	63	2	2	2	6	34
(United Kingdom) 2012 London	51	4	0	3	7	20
(Brazil) 2016 Rio de Janeiro	31	2	3	2	7	34
(Japan) 2020 Tokyo	did not participate					
(France) 2024 Paris	16	0	2	4	6	68
(United States) 2028 Los Angeles	future event					
(Australia) 2032 Brisbane	future event					
Total (11/30)	448	16	18	27	61	47

=== Medals by Winter Games ===
Games	Athletes	Gold	Silver	Bronze	Total	Rank
1924–1936	as part of Japan					
1948–1960	did not participate					
(Austria) 1964 Innsbruck	13	0	1	0	1	13
(France) 1968 Grenoble	did not participate					
(Japan) 1972 Sapporo	6	0	0	0	0	–
(Austria) 1976 Innsbruck	did not participate					
(United States) 1980 Lake Placid	did not participate					
(Socialist Federal Republic of Yugoslavia) 1984 Sarajevo	6	0	0	0	0	–
(Canada) 1988 Calgary	6	0	0	0	0	–
(France) 1992 Albertville	20	0	0	1	1	19
(Norway) 1994 Lillehammer	did not participate					
(Japan) 1998 Nagano	8	0	0	0	0	–
(United States) 2002 Salt Lake City	did not participate					
(Italy) 2006 Turin	6	0	0	0	0	–
(Canada) 2010 Vancouver	2	0	0	0	0	–
(Russia) 2014 Sochi	did not participate					
(South Korea) 2018 Pyeongchang	10	0	0	0	0	–
(China) 2022 Beijing	did not participate (suspended)					
(Italy) 2026 Milano Cortina	did not participate					
(France) 2030 French Alps	future event					
(United States) 2034 Utah	future event					
Total (9/25)	77	0	1	1	2	47

=== Medals by summer sport ===
Sport	Gold	Silver	Bronze	Total
Weightlifting	5	8	6	19
Wrestling	3	2	7	12
Gymnastics	3	0	0	3
Boxing	2	3	3	8
Judo	2	2	4	8
Shooting	1	0	2	3
Table tennis	0	2	3	5
Diving	0	1	1	2
Volleyball	0	0	1	1
Totals (9 entries)	16	18	27	61

=== Medals by winter sport ===
Sport	Gold	Silver	Bronze	Total
Speed skating	0	1	0	1
Short track speed skating	0	0	1	1
Totals (2 entries)	0	1	1	2

== List of medalists ==
=== Summer Olympics ===
Games	Medal	Name	Sport	Event
1972 Munich	Gold	Ri Ho-jun	Shooting	Mixed 50 metre rifle, prone
1972 Munich	Silver	Kim U-gil	Boxing	Men's light flyweight
1972 Munich	Bronze	Kim Yong-ik	Judo	Men's 63 kg
1972 Munich	Bronze	Ri Chun-ok; Kim Myong-suk; Kim Zung-bok; Kang Ok-sun; Kim Yeun-ja; Hwang He-suk; Jang Ok-rim; Paek Myong-suk; Ryom Chun-ja; Kim Su-dae; Jong Ok-jin	Volleyball	Women's tournament
1972 Munich	Bronze	Kim Gwong-hyong	Wrestling	Men's freestyle 52 kg
1976 Montreal	Gold	Gu Yong-ju	Boxing	Men's bantamweight
1976 Montreal	Silver	Ri Byong-uk	Boxing	Men's light flyweight
1980 Moscow	Silver	Jang Se-hong	Wrestling	Men's freestyle 48 kg
1980 Moscow	Silver	Li Ho-pyong	Wrestling	Men's freestyle 57 kg
1980 Moscow	Silver	Ho Bong-chol	Weightlifting	Men's 52 kg
1980 Moscow	Bronze	Han Gyong-si	Weightlifting	Men's 52 kg
1980 Moscow	Bronze	Ri Byong-uk	Boxing	Men's light flyweight
1992 Barcelona	Gold	Choi Chol-su	Boxing	Men's flyweight
1992 Barcelona	Gold	Pae Gil-su	Gymnastics	Men's pommel horse
1992 Barcelona	Gold	Kim Il	Wrestling	Men's freestyle 48 kg
1992 Barcelona	Gold	Ri Hak-son	Wrestling	Men's freestyle 52 kg
1992 Barcelona	Bronze	Kim Yong-sik	Wrestling	Men's freestyle 57 kg
1992 Barcelona	Bronze	Ri Gwang-sik	Boxing	Men's bantamweight
1992 Barcelona	Bronze	Ri Pun-hui; Yu Sun-bok	Table tennis	Women's doubles
1992 Barcelona	Bronze	Ri Pun-hui	Table tennis	Women's singles
1992 Barcelona	Bronze	Kim Myong-nam	Weightlifting	Men's 75 kg
1996 Atlanta	Gold	Kye Sun-hui	Judo	Women's 48 kg
1996 Atlanta	Gold	Kim Il	Wrestling	Men's freestyle 48 kg
1996 Atlanta	Silver	Kim Myong-nam	Weightlifting	Men's 70 kg
1996 Atlanta	Bronze	Jon Chol-ho	Weightlifting	Men's 76 kg
1996 Atlanta	Bronze	Ri Yong-sam	Wrestling	Men's freestyle 57 kg
2000 Sydney	Silver	Ri Song-hui	Weightlifting	Women's 58 kg
2000 Sydney	Bronze	Kim Un-chol	Boxing	Men's light flyweight
2000 Sydney	Bronze	Kye Sun-hui	Judo	Women's 52 kg
2000 Sydney	Bronze	Kang Yong-gyun	Wrestling	Men's Greco-Roman 54 kg
2004 Athens	Silver	Kim Song-guk	Boxing	Men's featherweight
2004 Athens	Silver	Kye Sun-hui	Judo	Women's lightweight
2004 Athens	Silver	Kim Hyang-mi	Table tennis	Women's singles
2004 Athens	Silver	Ri Song-Hui	Weightlifting	Women's 58 kg
2004 Athens	Bronze	Kim Jong-su	Shooting	Men's 50 metre pistol
2008 Beijing	Gold	Hong Un-jong	Gymnastics	Women's vault
2008 Beijing	Gold	Pak Hyon-suk	Weightlifting	Women's 63 kg
2008 Beijing	Silver	O Jong-ae	Weightlifting	Women's 58 kg
2008 Beijing	Silver	An Kum-ae	Judo	Women's lightweight
2008 Beijing	Bronze	Pak Chol-min	Judo	Men's lightweight
2008 Beijing	Bronze	Won Ok-im	Judo	Women's lightweight
2012 London	Gold	An Kum-ae	Judo	Women's 52 kg
2012 London	Gold	Om Yun-chol	Weightlifting	Men's 56 kg
2012 London	Gold	Kim Un-guk	Weightlifting	Men's 62 kg
2012 London	Gold	Rim Jong-sim	Weightlifting	Women's 69 kg
2012 London	Bronze	Ryang Chun-hwa	Weightlifting	Women's 48 kg
2012 London	Bronze	Kim Myong-hyok	Weightlifting	Men's 69 kg
2012 London	Bronze	Yang Kyong-il	Wrestling	Men's freestyle 55 kg
2016 Rio de Janeiro	Gold	Ri Se-gwang	Gymnastics	Men's vault
2016 Rio de Janeiro	Gold	Rim Jong-sim	Weightlifting	Women's 75 kg
2016 Rio de Janeiro	Silver	Om Yun-chol	Weightlifting	Men's 56 kg
2016 Rio de Janeiro	Silver	Choe Hyo-sim	Weightlifting	Women's 63 kg
2016 Rio de Janeiro	Silver	Kim Kuk-hyang	Weightlifting	Women's +75 kg
2016 Rio de Janeiro	Bronze	Kim Song-guk	Shooting	Men's 50 m pistol
2016 Rio de Janeiro	Bronze	Kim Song-i	Table tennis	Women's singles
2024 Paris	Silver	Kim Mi-rae; Jo Jin-mi	Diving	Women's synchronized 10 metre platform
2024 Paris	Silver	Ri Jong-sik; Kim Kum-yong	Table tennis	Mixed doubles
2024 Paris	Bronze	Kim Mi-rae	Diving	Women's 10 metre platform
2024 Paris	Bronze	Pang Chol-mi	Boxing	Bantamweight(54kg)
2024 Paris	Bronze	Ri Se Ung	Wrestling	Men's Greco-Roman 60 kg
2024 Paris	Bronze	Choe Hyo-gyong	Wrestling	Women's freestyle 53 kg

=== Winter Olympics ===
Medal	Name	Games	Sport	Event
Silver	Han Pil-hwa	1964 Innsbruck	Speed skating	Women's 3000 metres
Bronze	Hwang Ok-sil	1992 Albertville	Short track speed skating	Women's 500 metres

== Multiple medalists ==
Athlete	Sport	Games	Gold	Silver	Bronze	Total
Kye Sun-hui	Judo	1996, 2000, 2004	1	1	1	3
Kim Il	Wrestling	1992, 1996	2	0	0	2
Rim Jong-sim	Weightlifting	2012, 2016	2	0	0	2
An Kum-ae	Judo	2008, 2012	1	1	0	2
Om Yun-chol	Weightlifting	2012, 2016	1	1	0	2
Ri Song-hui	Weightlifting	2000, 2004	0	2	0	2
Ri Byong-uk	Boxing	1976, 1980	0	1	1	2
Kim Mi-rae	Diving	2024	0	1	1	2
Kim Myong-nam	Weightlifting	1992, 1996	0	1	1	2
Li Bun-hui	Table tennis	1992	0	0	2	2

== See also ==
- List of flag bearers for North Korea at the Olympics
- North Korea at the Paralympics
- Sport in North Korea
- Unified Korean sporting teams
- Category:Olympic competitors for North Korea
