= North Korea women's national volleyball team =

Women's national volleyball team representing North Korea

North Korea
- Association: The Volleyball Association of the D.P.R. Korea
- Confederation: AVC
- FIVB ranking: NR (24 May 2026)

Uniforms
Home

Summer Olympics
- Appearances: 1 (1972)
- Best result: Bronze Medal (1972)

World Championship
- Appearances: 4 (First in 1956)
- Best result: 3rd (1970)
Honours
Olympic Games
Bronze medal – third place	1972 Munich	Team
World Championship
Bronze medal – third place	1970 Varna	Team

The North Korea women's national volleyball team (recognized as DPR Korea by FIVB) represents North Korea in international volleyball competitions and friendly matches. They won bronze medal in the 1970 Women's World Championship and at the 1972 Summer Olympics.

== Results ==
The following are the rank of the North Korea women's volleyball team on their past tournaments.

Champions Runners-up Third place Fourth place

=== Summer Olympics ===
Summer Olympics record
Year	Round	Position	Pld	W	L	SW	SL	Squad
(Japan) 1964	Did not qualify							
(Mexico) 1968	Did not qualify							
(West Germany) 1972	Finals	3rd place	5	3	2	10	6	Squad
(Canada) 1976	Did not qualify							
(Soviet Union) 1980	Did not qualify							
(United States) 1984	Did not qualify							
(South Korea) 1988	Did not qualify							
(Spain) 1992	Did not qualify							
(United States) 1996	Did not qualify							
(Australia) 2000	Did not qualify							
(Greece) 2004	Did not qualify							
(China) 2008	Did not qualify							
(United Kingdom) 2012	Did not qualify							
(Brazil) 2016	Did not qualify							
(Japan) 2020	Did not qualify							
(France) 2024	Did not qualify							
Total	0 Title	1/16	5	3	2	10	6	—

=== World Championship ===
World Championship record
Year	Round	Position	Pld	W	L	SW	SL	Squad
(Soviet Union) 1952	Did not enter							
(France) 1956		7th place						
(Brazil) 1960	Did not qualify							
(Soviet Union) 1962		10th place						
(Japan) 1967	Did not qualify							
(Bulgaria) 1970		3rd place						
(Mexico) 1974	Did Not Participate							
(Soviet Union) 1978	Did not qualify							
(Peru) 1982	Did not qualify							
(Czechoslovakia) 1986		14th place						
(China) 1990	Did not qualify							
(Brazil) 1994	Did not qualify							
(Japan) 1998	Did not qualify							
(Germany) 2002	Did not qualify							
(Japan) 2006	Did not qualify							
(Japan) 2010	Did not qualify							
(Italy) 2014	Did not qualify							
(Japan) 2018	Did not qualify							
(Netherlands) (Poland) 2022	Did not qualify							
(Thailand) 2025	Did not qualify							
(Canada) (United States) 2027	To be determined							
(Philippines) 2029	To be determined							
Total	0 Title	4/22						—

=== Asian Games ===
Asian Games record
Year	Round	Position	Pld	W	L	SW	SL	Squad
(Indonesia) 1962	Did not enter							
(Thailand) 1966	Did not enter							
(Thailand) 1970	Did not enter							
(Iran) 1974	Finals	4th place	4	1	3	5	9	
(Thailand) 1978	Finals	4th place						
(India) 1982	Finals	4th place						
(South Korea) 1986	Did not enter							
(China) 1990	Finals	4th place						
(Japan) 1994	Did not enter							
(Thailand) 1998	Did not enter							
(South Korea) 2002	Did not enter							
(Qatar) 2006	Did not enter							
(China) 2010	Finals	4th place	8	5	3	17	11	Squads
(South Korea) 2014	Did not enter							
(Indonesia) 2018	Did not enter							
(China) 2022	Classification 5th–8th	7th place	6	2	4	9	15	
Total	0 Title	6/16	12	6	6	22	20	—

== Squads ==
- 1972 Summer Olympics - 3rd place
  Ri Chun-Ok, Kim Myong-Suk, Kim Zung-Bok, Kang Ok-Sun, Kim Yeun-Ja, Hwang He-Suk, Jang Ok-Rim, Paek Myong-Suk, Ryom Chun-Ja, Kim Su-Dae, and Jong Ok-Jin. Head coach:.
- 2010 Asian Games - 4th place
  Kim Un-jong, Kim Yong-mi, Jong Jin-sim, Han Ok-sim, Min Ok-ju, Choe Ryon, Kim Kyong-suk, Ri Hyon-suk, Nam Mi-hyang, Kim Hye-ok, Kim Ok-hui, Ri Sun-jong. Head coach: Kang Ok-sun.

== Head coaches ==
- (Serbia) Moro Branislav (2015–2016)

== Head-to-head record ==
This page shows Nouth Korea women's national volleyball team's Head-to-head record at the Volleyball at the Summer Olympics.

Opponent	GP	MW	ML	SW	SL
Cuba	1	1	0	3	0
Czechoslovakia	1	1	0	3	0
Japan	1	0	1	0	3
South Korea	1	1	0	3	0
Soviet Union	1	0	1	1	3
Total	5	3	2	10	6
