= North Korea at the 1972 Summer Olympics =

- IOC code: PRK
- NOC: Olympic Committee of the Democratic People's Republic of Korea

in Munich
- Competitors: 37 (23 men, 14 women) in 10 sports
- Flag bearer: Kim Man-dok
- Medals Ranked 22nd: Gold 1 Silver 1 Bronze 3 Total 5

Summer Olympics appearances (overview)
- 1972; 1976; 1980; 1984–1988; 1992; 1996; 2000; 2004; 2008; 2012; 2016; 2020; 2024

North Korea competed as the Democratic People's Republic of Korea at the 1972 Summer Olympics in Munich, West Germany. It was the first time that the nation had competed at the Summer Olympic Games. 37 competitors, 23 men and 14 women, took part in 23 events in 10 sports. North Korea won the first Olympic gold medal from either Korea.

== Medalists ==
Medal	Name	Sport	Event
Gold	Ri Ho-jun	Shooting	50 m Rifle Prone 60 shots
Silver	Kim U-gil	Boxing	Light flyweight division (48 kg)
Bronze	Kim Gwong-hyong	Wrestling	Freestyle (52 kg)
Bronze	Ri Chun-ok; Kim Myong-suk; Kim Zung-bok; Kang Ok-sun; Kim Yeun-ja; Hwang He-suk; Jang Ok-rim; Paek Myong-suk; Ryom Chun-ja; Kim Su-dae; Jong Ok-jin	Volleyball	Women's team competition
Bronze	Kim Yong-ik	Judo	Men's 63 kg

== Shooting ==
Three male shooters represented North Korea in 1972. Ri Ho-jun won gold in the 50 m rifle, prone event.

300 m rifle, three positions

- Li Yun-hae
- Ri Ho-jun

50 m rifle, three positions

- Ri Ho-jun
- Li Yun-hae

50 m rifle, prone

- Ri Ho-jun
- Li Yun-hae

50 m running target

- Kim Song-bok
