= Yasuhiro Noguchi =

Japanese volleyball player (1946–2023)

Olympic medal record

Men's Volleyball
Gold medal – first place	1972 Munich	Team

Yasuhiro Noguchi (野口 泰弘, Noguchi Yasuhiro; April 25, 1946 – November 29, 2023) was a Japanese volleyball player who competed in the 1972 Summer Olympics.

In 1972, he was part of the Japanese team which won the gold medal in the Olympic tournament. He played five matches.

Noguchi died from kidney failure on November 29, 2023, at the age of 77.
