= Inna Ryskal =

Soviet volleyball player (born 1944)

Personal information
- Full name: Inna Valeryevna Ryskal
- Nickname: Инна Валерьевна Рыскаль
- Nationality: Soviet
- Born: 15 June 1944 (age 82); Baku, Azerbaijan SSR, Soviet Union
- Height: 1.72 m (5 ft 7 1/2 in)
Medal record
Women's volleyball
Representing the Soviet Union
Olympic Games
Gold medal – first place	1968 Mexico City	Team
Gold medal – first place	1972 Munich	Team
Silver medal – second place	1964 Tokyo	Team
Silver medal – second place	1976 Montreal	Team
World Championship
Gold medal – first place	1970 Bulgaria	Team
Silver medal – second place	1962 Soviet Union	Team
Silver medal – second place	1974 Mexico	Team
FIVB World Cup
Gold medal – first place	1973 Uruguay	Team

Inna Valeryevna Ryskal (Russian: Инна Валерьевна Рыскаль; born 15 June 1944 in Baku, Azerbaijan SSR) is a former Soviet volleyball player for the USSR. She was one of the pre-eminent players of the 1960s and the early 1970s, training at VSS Neftchi in Baku.

She was a major player to help Soviet Union women's national volleyball team to dominate the World in late 1960s to early 1970s by winning 1968 Mexico City Olympic Games, 1970 FIVB Women's World Championship, 1972 Munich Olympic Games and 1973 FIVB Women's World Cup in row . She achieved an Olympic silver medals in 1964 and 1976. She also won European Volleyball Championship in 1963, 1967 and 1971. In 1972 she was awarded the Order of the Red Banner of Labour.
