= Aleksandr Saprykin =

Soviet volleyball player (1946–2021)

Personal information
- Full name: Aleksandr Mikhaylovich Saprykin
- Nickname: Александр Михайлович Сапрыкин
- Nationality: Russian
- Born: 28 July 1946; Kaluga, Russian SFSR, Soviet Union
- Died: 4 May 2021 (aged 74); Saint Petersburg, Russia
Honours
Men's volleyball
Representing Soviet Union
Olympic Games
Bronze medal – third place	1972 Munich	Team

Aleksandr Mikhaylovich Saprykin (Russian: Александр Михайлович Сапрыкин; 28 July 1946 – 4 May 2021) was a Russian volleyball player who competed for the Soviet Union in the 1972 Summer Olympics.

In 1972 he was part of the Soviet team which won the bronze medal in the Olympic tournament. He played all seven matches.
