= Vladimir Putyatov =

Russian volleyball player (born 1945)

Personal information
- Full name: Vladimir Nikolaevich Putyatov
- Nickname: Владимир Николаевич Путятов
- Nationality: Russian
- Born: 24 December 1945 (age 80) Moscow, Russian SFSR, Soviet Union
Honours
Men's volleyball
Representing Soviet Union
Olympic Games
Bronze medal – third place	1972 Munich	Team

Vladimir Nikolaevich Putyatov (Russian: Владимир Николаевич Путятов, born 24 December 1945) is a Russian former volleyball player who competed for the Soviet Union in the 1972 Summer Olympics.

In 1972 he was part of the Soviet team which won the bronze medal in the Olympic tournament. He played six matches.
