= Yoshihide Fukao =

Japanese volleyball player (born 1949)

Personal information
- Nationality: Japanese
- Born: July 1, 1949 (age 77) Hikone, Japan
Medal record
Men's volleyball
Representing Japan
Olympic Games
| Gold medal – first place | 1972 Munich | Team |

Yoshihide Fukao (深尾 吉英, Fukao Yoshihide; born July 1, 1949) is a Japanese former volleyball player who competed in the 1972 Summer Olympics and in the 1976 Summer Olympics.

He was born in Hikone.

In 1972, he was part of the Japanese team which won the gold medal in the Olympic tournament. He played all seven matches.

Four years later, in 1976, he finished fourth with the Japanese team in the Olympic tournament. He played all five matches.
