= Rosa Salikhova =

Soviet volleyball player (1944–2026)

Personal information
- Full name: Rosa Galyamovna Salikhova
- Born: 24 September 1944; Nizhny Tagil, Sverdlovsk Oblast, Russian SFSR, Soviet Union
- Died: 26 March 2026 (aged 81)
- Height: 1.74 m (5 ft 8 1/2 in)
Honours
Women's volleyball
Representing the Soviet Union
Olympic Games
Gold medal – first place	1968 Mexico City	Team
Gold medal – first place	1972 Munich	Team
World Championship
Gold medal – first place	1970 Bulgaria	Team
Silver medal – second place	1974 Mexico	Team
FIVB World Cup
Gold medal – first place	1973 Uruguay	Team

Rosa Galyamovna Salikhova (Russian: Роза Галямовна Салихова, Tatar: Роза Галләм кызы Салихова; 24 September 1944 – 26 March 2026) was a volleyball player for the Soviet Union.

== Biography ==
Salikhova was a major player in helping the Soviet Union's women's national volleyball team to dominate the world in the late 1960s to early 1970s by winning at the 1968 Mexico City Olympic Games, the 1970 FIVB Women's World Championship, the 1972 Munich Olympic Games and the 1973 FIVB Women's World Cup in a row.

== Death ==
Salikhova's death at the age of 81 was announced on 26 March 2026.
