= Leonid Zayko =

Russian volleyball player (born 1948)

Olympic medal record

Men's Volleyball
Bronze medal – third place	1972 Munich	Team

Leonid Nikolaevich Zayko (Russian: Леонид Николаевич Зайко; born 15 February 1948 in Sovetskaya Gavan, Russian SFSR) is a Russian former volleyball player who competed for the Soviet Union in the 1972 Summer Olympics.

In 1972, he was part of the Soviet team that won the bronze medal in the Olympic tournament. He played six matches.
