= Tetsuo Nishimoto =

Japanese volleyball player (born 1950)

Olympic medal record

Men's Volleyball
Gold medal – first place	1972 Munich	Team

Tetsuo Nishimoto (西本 哲雄, Nishimoto Tetsuo; born December 16, 1950) is a Japanese former volleyball player who competed in the 1972 Summer Olympics and in the 1976 Summer Olympics.

He was born in Hiroshima.

In 1972, he was part of the Japanese team which won the gold medal in the Olympic tournament. He played four matches.

Four years later, in 1976, he finished fourth with the Japanese team in the 1976 Olympic tournament. He played all five matches.
