= Vladimir Patkin =

Soviet volleyball player (born 1947)

Personal information
- Full name: Vladimir Leonidovich Patkin
- Nickname: Владимир Леонидович Паткин
- Nationality: Russian
- Born: 8 December 1945 (age 80) Voronezh Oblast, Russian SFSR, Soviet Union

Volleyball information

National team
- Years: Team
- –: Soviet Union
Honours
Men's volleyball
Representing Soviet Union
Olympic Games
Bronze medal – third place	1972 Munich	Team

Vladimir Leonidovich Patkin (born 8 December 1945) is a Russian former volleyball player who competed for the Soviet Union in the 1972 Summer Olympics. He was born in Bobrov, Voronezh, Russian SFSR.

== Volleyball career ==
He won a gold medal at the 1971 European Athletics Championships.

He a member of the Soviet team which won the bronze medal in the 1972 Olympics. He played six matches.

He later became the Secretary General of the Russian Volleyball Federation.

== See also ==
- List of select Jewish volleyball players
