= Vyacheslav Domani =

Russian volleyball player (born 1947)

Personal information
- Full name: Vyacheslav Grigorevich Domani
- Nickname: Вячеслав Григорьевич Домани
- Nationality: Russian
- Born: 2 May 1947 Russian SFSR, Soviet Union
- Died: 4 February 1996 (aged 48)

Volleyball information

National team
- Years: Team
- –: Soviet Union men's national volleyball team
Honours
Men's volleyball
Representing Soviet Union
Olympic Games
Bronze medal – third place	1972 Munich	Team

Vyacheslav Grigorevich Domani (Russian: Вячеслав Григорьевич Домани, 2 May 1947 – 4 February 1996) was a Russian former volleyball player who competed for the Soviet Union in the 1972 Summer Olympics. In 1972, he was part of the Soviet team which won the bronze medal in the Olympic tournament. He played all seven matches. His son Dmitri Domani played basketball professionally.
