= Vera Galushka-Duyunova =

Soviet volleyball player (1945–2012)

Personal information
- Full name: Vera Illarionovna Galushka-Duyunova
- Born: April 11, 1945 Krasnodar, Russian SFSR, Soviet Union
- Died: March 2, 2012 (aged 66) Tashkent, Uzbekistan
- Height: 1.82 m (5 ft 11 1/2 in)
Honours
Women's volleyball
Representing the Soviet Union
Olympic Games
Gold medal – first place	1968 Mexico City	Team
Gold medal – first place	1972 Munich	Team
Women's World Championship
Gold medal – first place	1970 Bulgaria	Team
Silver medal – second place	1974 Mexico	Team
FIVB World Cup
Gold medal – first place	1973 Uruguay	Team

Vera Galushka-Duyunova (April 11, 1945 – March 2, 2012) was a Soviet volleyball player in 1966–74. She was a major player to help Soviet Union women's national volleyball team to dominate the World in late 1960s to early 1970s by winning 1968 Mexico City Olympic Games, 1970 FIVB Women's World Championship, 1972 Munich Olympic Games and 1973 FIVB Women's World Cup in row. She played for Spartak Tashkent.
