= Seiko Shimakage =

Japanese volleyball player (born 1949)

Personal information
- Born: February 16, 1949 (age 77); Sakata, Japan
Medal record
Women's volleyball
Representing Japan
Olympic Games
Silver medal – second place	1972 Munich	Team

Seiko Shimakage (島影 せい子, Shimakage Seiko; born February 16, 1949) is a Japanese former volleyball player who competed in the 1972 Summer Olympics.

She was born in Sakata.

In 1972 she was part of the Japanese team which won the silver medal in the Olympic tournament. She played all five matches.
