= Lyubov Tyurina =

Soviet volleyball player (1943–2015)

Personal information
- Full name: Lyubov Nikolaevna Tyurina
- Born: April 25, 1943 Moscow, Russian SFSR, Soviet Union
- Died: October 23, 2015 (aged 72) Moscow, Russia
- Height: 1.81 m (5 ft 11 in)
- Weight: 75 kg (165 lb)
Honours
Women's volleyball
Representing the Soviet Union
Olympic Games
Gold medal – first place	1972 Munich	Team

Lyubov Nikolaevna Tyurina (April 25, 1943 – October 23, 2015) was a volleyball player for the USSR who won a gold medal at the 1972 Summer Olympics in Munich, West Germany.
