= Michiko Shiokawa =

Japanese volleyball player (born 1951)

Olympic medal record

Representing Japan

Women's Volleyball

Olympic Games
Silver medal – second place	1972 Munich	Team

Michiko Shiokawa (塩川 美知子, Shiokawa Michiko; later Furuhashi 古橋, born January 26, 1951) is a Japanese former volleyball player who competed in the 1972 Summer Olympics.

In 1972 she was part of the Japanese team which won the silver medal in the Olympic tournament. She played all five matches.
