= Nataliya Kudreva =

Soviet volleyball player (born 1942)

Personal information
- Full name: Nataliya Alekseyevna Kudreva
- Nationality: Russian
- Born: 8 June 1942 (age 84); Krasnodar, Krasnodar Kray, Russia, Soviet Union
- Height: 1.71 m (5 ft 7 1/2 in)

National team
| Soviet Union |
Honours
Women's volleyball
Representing the Soviet Union
Olympic Games
| Gold medal – first place | 1972 Munich | Team |

Nataliya Alekseyevna Kudreva (Russian: Наталья Алексеевна Кудрева; born 8 June 1942) is a volleyball player for the Soviet Union. She was part of the Soviet team which won the gold medal in Women's Volleyball at the 1972 Summer Olympics.
