= Tatyana Gonobobleva =

Soviet volleyball player (1948–2007)

Personal information
- Full name: Tatyana Pavlovna Gonobobleva (Semyonova-)
- Born: November 19, 1948; Leningrad, Russian SFSR, Soviet Union
- Died: May 28, 2007 (aged 58)
- Height: 1.66 m (5 ft 5 1/2 in)

Volleyball information
- Position: Setter
- Number: 12
Honours
Women's volleyball
Representing the Soviet Union
Olympic Games
Gold medal – first place	1972 Munich	Team
World Championship
Silver medal – second place	1974 Mexico	Team
World Cup
Gold medal – first place	1973 Uruguay	Team

Tatyana Pavlovna Gonobobleva (November 19, 1948 – May 28, 2007) is a former volleyball player for the USSR. Born in Leningrad, she competed for the Soviet Union at the 1972 Summer Olympics.
