= Lyudmila Borozna =

Soviet volleyball player (born 1954)

Personal information
- Full name: Lyudmila Vasilyevna Borozna (-Zhigily)
- Nationality: Russian
- Born: 2 January 1954 (age 72); Leningrad, Russian SFSR, Soviet Union
- Height: 1.80 m (5 ft 11 in)

Volleyball information
- Position: Outside hitter
- Number: 4

National team
1972-1978	Soviet Union
Honours
Women's volleyball
Representing the Soviet Union
Olympic Games
Gold medal – first place	1972 Munich	Team
World Championship
Silver medal – second place	1974 Mexico	Team
Bronze medal – third place	1978 Soviet Union	Team
World Cup
Gold medal – first place	1973 Uruguay	Team

Lyudmila Vasilyevna Borozna (Russian: Людмила Васильевна Борозна; born 2 January 1954) is a Russian former volleyball player for the Soviet Union. She was part of the Soviet team that won the gold medal in women's volleyball at the 1972 Summer Olympics.
