= Noriko Yamashita =

Japanese volleyball player (born 1945)

Olympic medal record

Women's Volleyball
Silver medal – second place	1972 Munich	Team

Noriko Yamashita (山下 規子, Yamashita Noriko; later Nishi 西, born March 6, 1945) is a Japanese former volleyball player who competed in the 1972 Summer Olympics.

She was born in Yamaguchi Prefecture.

In 1972 she was part of the Japanese team which won the silver medal in the Olympic tournament. She played all five matches.
