= Yaeko Yamazaki =

Japanese volleyball player (born 1950)

Olympic medal record

Women's Volleyball
Silver medal – second place	1972 Munich	Team

Yaeko Yamazaki (山崎 八重子, Yamazaki Yaeko; born September 2, 1950) is a Japanese former volleyball player who competed in the 1972 Summer Olympics.

She was born in Ōmuta.

In 1972 she was part of the Japanese team which won the silver medal in the Olympic tournament. She played two matches.
