= Viktor Borshch =

Russian volleyball player (born 1948)

Personal information
- Full name: Viktor Nikolaevich Borshch
- Nationality: Soviet
- Born: 9 September 1948 Moscow, USSR
- Died: 30 July 2025 (aged 76)

Volleyball information

National team
- Years: Team
- –: Soviet Union
Honours
Men's volleyball
Representing Soviet Union
Olympic Games
| Bronze medal – third place | 1972 Munich | Team |
- Updated on 31 December 2017

Viktor Nikolaevich Borshch (Russian: Виктор Николаевич Борщ, 9 September 1948 — 30 July 2025) was a Russian former volleyball player who competed for the Soviet Union in the 1972 Summer Olympics.

In 1972 he was part of the Soviet team which won the bronze medal in the Olympic tournament. He played six matches.

== Personal life ==
Viktor Borsch's son is the Russian volleyball player and coach Pavel Borsch.

Viktor Borsch died on July 30, 2025.
