= Volleyball at the 1972 Summer Olympics =

Volleyball at the Games of the XX Olympiad
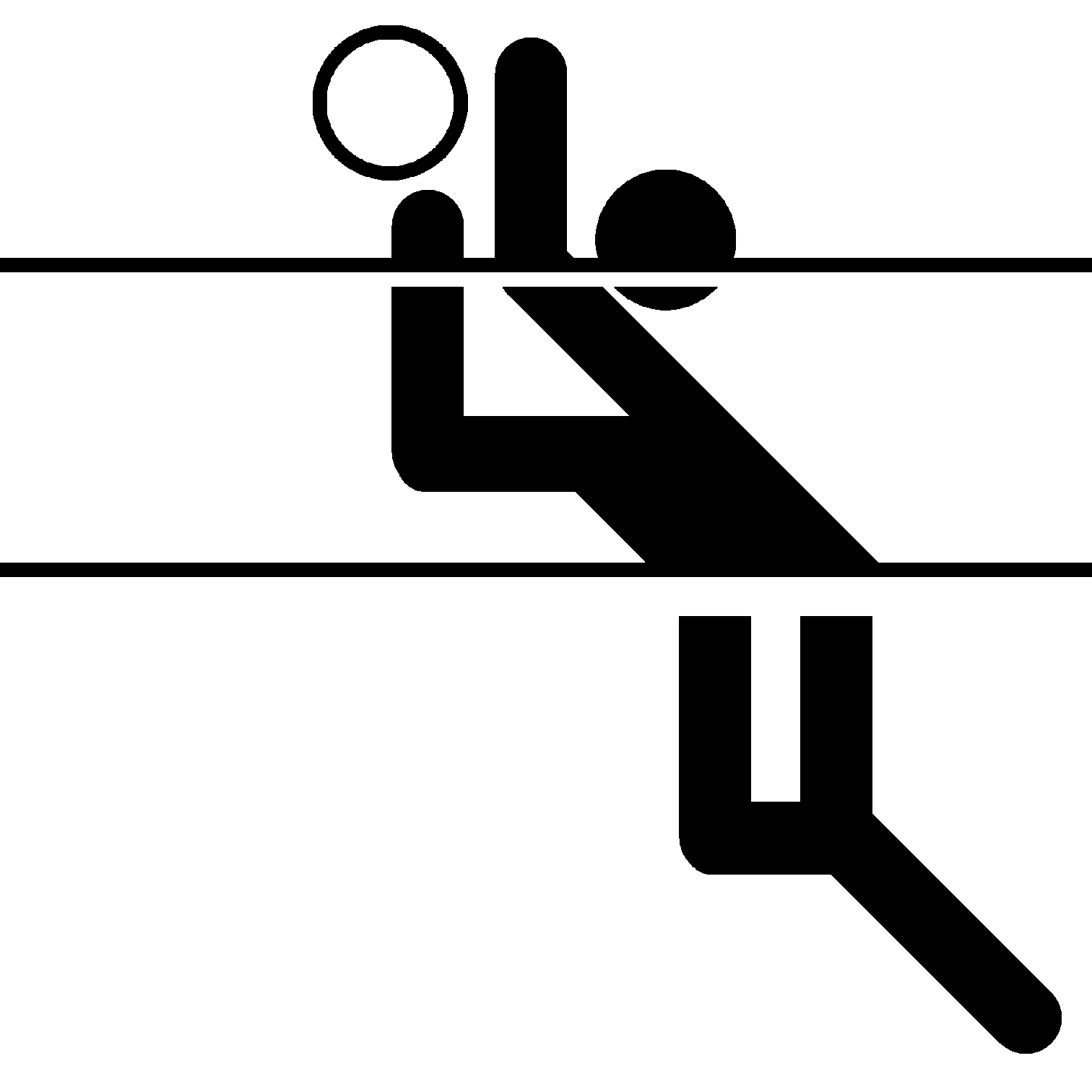
- Pictograms for indoor
- Venue: Volleyballhalle
- Dates: 27 August – 9 September 1972
- No. of events: 2
- Competitors: 231 from 14 nations

Volleyball at the 1972 Summer Olympics was represented by two events: men's team and women's team.

== Medal table ==
| Rank | Nation | Gold | Silver | Bronze | Total |
|---|---|---|---|---|---|
| 1 | Japan | 1 | 1 | 0 | 2 |
| 2 | Soviet Union | 1 | 0 | 1 | 2 |
| 3 | East Germany | 0 | 1 | 0 | 1 |
| 4 | North Korea | 0 | 0 | 1 | 1 |
| Totals (4 entries) | | 2 | 2 | 2 | 6 |

== Medal summary ==
| Event | Gold | Silver | Bronze |
|---|---|---|---|
| Men's indoor | Japan; Masayuki Minami; Katsutoshi Nekoda; Yūzo Nakamura; Tetsuo Nishimoto; Kenji Kimura; Yoshihide Fukao; Yasuhiro Noguchi; Jungo Morita; Tadayoshi Yokota; Seiji Oko; Tetsuo Satō; Kenji Shimaoka | East Germany; Horst Peter; Horst Hagen; Siegfried Schneider; Wolfgang Löwe; Rainer Tscharke; Eckehard Pietzsch; Arnold Schulz; Wolfgang Maibohm; Wolfgang Weise; Jürgen Maune; Rudi Schumann; Wolfgang Webner | Soviet Union; Yuriy Poyarkov; Valeri Kravchenko; Yefim Chulak; Yevhen Lapinsky; Vladimir Putyatov; Viktor Borshch; Vladimir Patkin; Leonid Zayko; Aleksandr Saprykin; Yuri Starunsky; Vyacheslav Domani; Vladimir Kondra |
| Women's indoor | Soviet Union; Lyudmila Buldakova; Lyubov Tyurina; Vera Galushka-Duyunova; Lyudmila Borozna; Tatyana Sarycheva; Nina Smoleyeva; Tatyana Ponyayeva-Tretyakova; Rosa Salikhova; Inna Ryskal; Nataliya Kudreva; Galina Leontyeva; Tatyana Gonobobleva | Japan; Katsumi Matsumura; Noriko Yamashita; Toyoko Iwahara; Takako Iida; Sumie Oinuma; Makiko Furukawa; Keiko Hama; Seiko Shimakage; Yaeko Yamazaki; Michiko Shiokawa; Mariko Okamoto; Takako Shirai | North Korea; Ryom Chun-ja; Kim Su-dae; Ri Chun-ok; Paek Myong-suk; Jong Ok-jin; Kim Myong-suk; Jang Ok-rim; Kim Yeun-ja; Kim Zung-bok; Kang Ok-sun; Hwang He-Suk |
