= Ri Chun-ok =

North Korean volleyball player (born 1947)

Olympic medal record

Women's volleyball

Representing North Korea
Bronze medal – third place	1972 Munich	Team

- Ri Chun-ok
- Hangul: 리춘옥
- RR: Ri Chunok
- MR: Ri Ch'unok

Ri Chun-ok (born May 25, 1947) is a female North Korean former volleyball player who competed in the 1972 Summer Olympics.

In 1972, she was part of the North Korean team which won the bronze medal in the Olympic tournament. She played three matches.
