= Kim Su-dae =

North Korean volleyball player (born 1942)

Personal information
- Nationality: North Korean
- Born: May 13, 1942 (age 84); Korea, Empire of Japan
Medal record
Women's volleyball
Representing North Korea
Olympic Games
Bronze medal – third place	1972 Munich	Team

- Kim Su-dae
- Hangul: 김수대
- RR: Gim Sudae
- MR: Kim Sudae

Kim Su-dae (Korean: 김수대; born May 13, 1942) is a North Korean former volleyball player who competed in the 1972 Summer Olympics.

In 1972 she was part of the North Korean team which won the bronze medal in the Olympic tournament. She played four matches.
