= Jong Ok-jin =

North Korean volleyball player (born 1945)

Personal information
- Born: June 6, 1945 (age 81); Korea, Empire of Japan

Olympic medal record

Women's volleyball

Representing North Korea
Bronze medal – third place	1972 Munich	Team

- Jong Ok-jin
- Hangul: 정옥진
- RR: Jeong Okjin
- MR: Chŏng Okchin

Jong Ok-jin (Korean: 정옥진; born June 6, 1945) is a female North Korean former volleyball player who competed in the 1972 Summer Olympics.

In 1972, she was part of the North Korean team which won the bronze medal in the Olympic tournament. She played four matches.
