= Kim Zung-bok =

North Korean volleyball player (born 1945)

Olympic medal record

Women's volleyball

Representing North Korea
Bronze medal – third place	1972 Munich	Team

- Kim Zung-bok
- Hangul: 김증복
- RR: Gim Jeungbok
- MR: Kim Chŭngbok

Kim Zung-bok (Korean: 김증복; born July 17, 1945) is a North Korean former volleyball player who competed in the 1972 Summer Olympics.

In 1972 she was part of the North Korean team which won the bronze medal in the Olympic tournament. She played all five matches.
