= Kim Myong-suk =

North Korean volleyball player (born 1947)

Olympic medal record

Women's Volleyball

Representing North Korea
Bronze medal – third place	1972 Munich	Team

- Kim Myong-suk
- Hangul: 김명숙
- RR: Gim Myeongsuk
- MR: Kim Myŏngsuk

Kim Myong-suk (Korean: 김명숙; born April 14, 1947) is a female North Korean former volleyball player who competed in the 1972 Summer Olympics.

In 1972 she was part of the North Korean team which won the bronze medal in the Olympic tournament. She played four matches.
