= Kang Ok-sun =

North Korean volleyball player (born 1946)

Olympic medal record

Women's volleyball

Representing North Korea
Bronze medal – third place	1972 Munich	Team

- Kang Ok-sun
- Hangul: 강옥순
- Hanja: 姜玉順
- RR: Gang Oksun
- MR: Kang Oksun

Kang Ok-sun (Korean: 강옥순; born April 14, 1946) is a female North Korean former volleyball player who competed in the 1972 Summer Olympics.In 1972 she was part of the North Korean team which won the bronze medal in the Olympic tournament. She played all five matches.

== Biography ==
She was born to a family in Namsanri,Hongwon County in 1946. She first participated in international competitions in the 1962 FIVB Women's Volleyball World Championship. From 1975, she was the coach for the volleyball team April 25 Sports Club. She was awarded the title of People's Athlete in 1975.
