= Paek Myong-suk =

North Korean volleyball player (born 1954)

Olympic medal record

Women's volleyball

Representing North Korea
Bronze medal – third place	1972 Munich	Team

- Paek Myong-suk
- Hangul: 백명숙
- RR: Baek Myeongsuk
- MR: Paek Myŏngsuk

Paek Myong-suk (born February 24, 1954) is a female North Korean former volleyball player who competed in the 1972 Summer Olympics.

In 1972 she was part of the North Korean team which won the bronze medal in the Olympic tournament. She played one match.
