= Kim Yeun-ja =

North Korean volleyball player (born 1943)

Kim Yeun-Ja

Personal information
- Nationality: North Korean
- Born: February 10, 1943 (age 83); Korea, Empire of Japan
Medal record
Women's volleyball
Representing North Korea
Olympic Games
Bronze medal – third place	1972 Munich	Team

Kim Yeun-ja (Korean: 김연자, born February 10, 1943) is a North Korean former volleyball player who competed in the 1972 Summer Olympics.

In 1972 she was part of the North Korean team which won the bronze medal in the Olympic tournament. She played all five matches.
