= Ryom Chun-ja =

North Korean volleyball player (born 1942)

Personal information
- Born: November 19, 1942 (age 83); Korea, Empire of Japan

Olympic medal record

Women's volleyball

Representing North Korea
Bronze medal – third place	1972 Munich	Team

- Ryom Chun-ja
- Hangul: 렴춘자
- RR: Ryeom Chunja
- MR: Ryŏm Ch'unja

Ryom Chun-ja (born November 19, 1942) is a female North Korean former volleyball player who competed in the 1972 Summer Olympics.

In 1972 she was part of the North Korean team which won the bronze medal in the Olympic tournament. She played four matches.
