= Hwang He-suk =

North Korean volleyball player (born 1945)

Personal information
- Nationality: North Korean
- Born: December 9, 1945 (age 80); Pyongyang, Soviet Civil Administration
Honours
Women's volleyball
Representing North Korea
Olympic Games
Bronze medal – third place	1972 Munich	Team

Korean name
- Hangul: 황혜숙
- RR: Hwang Hyesuk
- MR: Hwang Hyesuk

Hwang He-suk (born December 9, 1945) is a female North Korean former volleyball player who competed in the 1972 Summer Olympics.

In 1972 she was part of the North Korean team which won the bronze medal in the Olympic tournament. She played all five matches.
