= Jang Ok-rim =

North Korean volleyball player (born 1948)

Olympic medal record

Women's volleyball

Representing North Korea
Bronze medal – third place	1972 Munich	Team

- Jang Ok-rim
- Hangul: 장옥림
- Hanja: 張玉林
- RR: Jang Okrim
- MR: Chang Ongnim

Jang Ok-rim (Korean: 장옥림; born February 8, 1948) is a female North Korean former volleyball player who competed in the 1972 Summer Olympics.

In 1972 she was part of the North Korean team which won the bronze medal in the Olympic tournament. She played one match.
