= Volleyball at the Summer Olympics =

- IOC Code: VVO
- Governing body: FIVB
- Events: 2 (men: 1; women: 1)

Summer Olympics
- 1896; 1900; 1904; 1908; 1912; 1920; 1924; 1928; 1932; 1936; 1948; 1952; 1956; 1960; 1964; 1968; 1972; 1976; 1980; 1984; 1988; 1992; 1996; 2000; 2004; 2008; 2012; 2016; 2020; 2024; 2028; 2032
- Medalists

Volleyball has been part of the Summer Olympics program for both men and women consistently since 1964.

Brazil, France, the United States and the former Soviet Union are the only teams to win multiple gold medals at the men's tournament since its introduction. The remaining six editions of the Men's Olympic Volleyball Tournament were won each by a different country including Japan, Poland, Netherlands, Russia and the defunct Yugoslavia.

Gold medals are less evenly distributed in women's volleyball than in men's; the sixteen editions of the Women's Olympic Volleyball Tournament were won by seven countries: Brazil, Cuba, China, Japan, Italy, the United States and the former Soviet Union.

== History ==
=== Origins ===
The history of Olympic volleyball can be traced back to the 1924 Summer Olympics in Paris, where it was an unofficial demonstration event. Its addition to the Olympic program, however, was given only after World War II, with the foundation of the FIVB and of some of the continental confederations. In 1957, a special tournament was held during the 53rd IOC session in Sofia, Bulgaria, to support such request. The competition was a success, and the sport was officially introduced in 1964. The International Olympic Committee attempted to drop volleyball for the 1968 Olympics, but this was met with protest.

The volleyball Olympic tournament was originally a simple competition, whose format paralleled the one still employed in the World Cup: all teams played against each other team and then were ranked by number of wins, set average and point average. One disadvantage of this round-robin system is that medal winners could be determined before the end of the games, making the audience lose interest in the outcome of the remaining matches.

To cope with this situation, the competition was split into two phases: a "final round" was introduced, consisting of quarterfinals, semifinals and finals. Since its creation in 1972, this new system has become the standard for the volleyball Olympic tournament, and is usually referred to as the "Olympic format".

The number of teams involved in the games has grown steadily since 1964. Since 1996, both men's and women's indoor events count 12 participant nations. Each of the five continental volleyball confederations has at least one affiliated national federation involved in the Olympic Games.

=== Events ===
Event	64	68	72	76	80	84	88	92	96	00	04	08	12	16	20	24	28	Years
Men's tournament	X	X	X	X	X	X	X	X	X	X	X	X	X	X	X	X	X	17
Women's tournament	X	X	X	X	X	X	X	X	X	X	X	X	X	X	X	X	X	17
Total	2	2	2	2	2	2	2	2	2	2	2	2	2	2	2	2	2	

=== Men's winners ===
The first two editions of the volleyball Olympic tournament were won by the Soviet Union team. Bronze in 1964 and silver in 1968, Japan won gold in 1972. In 1976, the introduction of a new offensive skill, the back row attack, helped Poland win the competition over the Soviets in a very tight five-setter.

In 1980, many of the strongest teams in men's volleyball belonged to the Eastern Bloc, so the American-led boycott of the 1980 Summer Olympics did not have as great an effect on these events as it had on the women's. The Soviet Union collected their third Olympic gold medal with a 3–1 victory over Bulgaria. With a Soviet-led boycott in 1984, the United States confirmed their new volleyball leadership in the Western World by sweeping smoothly over Brazil in the finals. In that edition a minor nation, Italy, won their first medal, but Italy would rise to prominence in volleyball in later decades. A long-awaited confrontation between the US and Soviet volleyball teams came in the 1988 final: powerplayers Karch Kiraly and Steve Timmons pushed the United States to a second gold medal setting the issue in favor of the Americans.

In 1992, Brazil upset favorites Unified Team, Netherlands, and Italy for their first Olympic championship. Runners-up Netherlands, with Ron Zwerver and Olof van der Meulen, came back in the following edition for a five-set win over Italy. In spite of their success in other major volleyball competitions in the 1990s, Italy did not fare well at the Olympics. After winning bronze in Atlanta, Serbia and Montenegro, led by Vladimir and Nikola Grbić, beat Russia at the final in 2000 to secure the gold (in 1996 and 2000 they played under the name Federal Republic of Yugoslavia).

In 2004, Brazil beat Italy in the final, adding a second gold medal to their record and confirming their role as the men's volleyball superpowers of the 2000s. In 2008, United States beat Brazil in the final, winning their third gold medal. Russia won the bronze for the second time by defeating Italy. In the 2012 final, Russia came back from a 0–2 set deficit, not letting the Brazilians take advantage of any of their 2 match points in the third set. Dmitriy Muserskiy scored 31 points, which is an Olympic Games record in a final. Italy defeated Bulgaria and took Bronze.

After coming up short in the previous two editions of the Olympics as runners-up, the Brazilians captured their third gold medal in the history of the competition playing home in 2016 after their straight-set victory against Italy in the final. The United States pulled off a comeback from a 0–2 deficit to claim the bronze medal with a victory over Russia.

The 2020 tournament, held in 2021 due to the global COVID-19 pandemic causing a delay, had the French team of Earvin N'Gapeth win its first gold by defeating the Russian Olympic Committee, who returned to the podium after missing out in 2016. In a repeat of the 1988 bronze medal match, Brazil were upset by neighbor Argentina.

In the 2024 tournament, the host nation France defended their Olympic title by securing the gold medal after defeating Poland in a dominant 3–0 victory. Poland won the silver medal, marking their first Olympic volleyball final appearance in 48 years. The podium was completed by the United States, who claimed the bronze medal with a straight-sets sweep against Italy.

Gold medals appear to be more evenly distributed in men's volleyball than in women's: the former Soviet Union (three titles), United States (three), Brazil (three), and France (two) are the only teams to have won the tournament more than once. The remaining six editions were won each by a different country. Despite having been a major force in men's volleyball since the 1990s and never missing a tournament since 1976, Italy are the only volleyball powerhouse that lack a gold medal at the Olympic Games.

=== Women's winners ===
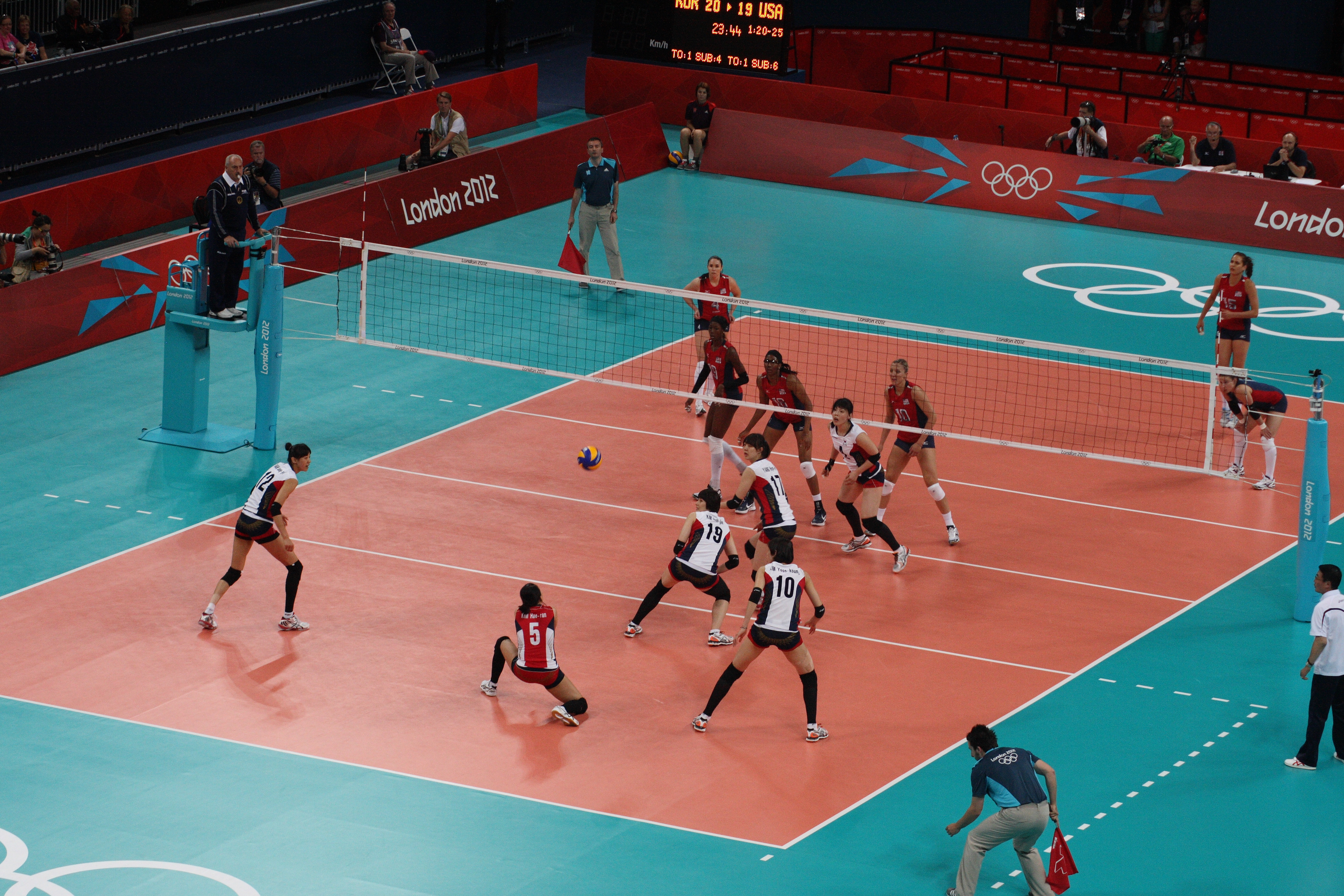
Women's volleyball semifinals match between the United States and South Korea at the 2012 Summer Olympics.

The opening edition of the volleyball Olympic tournament, in 1964, was won by the host nation Japan. There followed two victories in a row by the Soviet Union, in 1968 and 1972. South Korea were expected to get their first gold after beating Japan in the 1975 Pre-Olympic Games, but Japan came back again in 1976 for one last Olympic gold before losing their status of women's volleyball superpowers.

The American-led boycott of the 1980 Games left many strong volleyball nations like Japan and South Korea out of the games. As a result, the Soviet Union easily secured a third Olympic gold medal. In 1984, the Eastern bloc was, in its turn, boycotting the games, and the Soviet Union did not participate. As a result, host nation United States won its first medals in volleyball, losing the finals to China. With eastern and western nations again involved in the Olympics, the Soviet Union obtained a remarkable victory over Peru after trailing 0–2 in 1988's marking one of the most dramatic female matches of the 20th century. The 1988 games were, however, boycotted by Cuba, who would become the next dominating force.

1992 saw a new force go down in Olympic history: organized under the name Unified Team, the nations of the former Soviet Union that chose to form a combined team easily reached the gold medal game, but could not neutralize the power play of the young, rising Cuban squad. Led by superstars Mireya Luis and Regla Torres, Cuba would eventually set the record for consecutive wins in the Olympic Games by also taking the gold in 1996 and 2000 against China and Russia, respectively.

In 2004, the winners were once again China. Second were Russia who beat Brazil in a very tough and dramatic semifinal match after being down 1–2, 19–24 in the fourth set.

In 2008, Brazil finally won the gold, beating the United States in the final and losing only one set in the competition. China were awarded the bronze by beating Cuba. After a troubled start, Brazil secured the double gold in 2012 after beating the United States once again in the final. Japan won the bronze medal after defeating South Korea.

In 2016, home team Brazil were favorites to once again win the title, thus equalling Cuba's three consecutive gold medals between 1992 and 2000. After winning all of their preliminary round matches without dropping a set, the team was, however, stunned by a young Chinese squad in a tiebreaker in the quarterfinals. China went on to win the title, their third in Olympic history, by beating Serbia in four sets in the gold medal match. In the process, Lang Ping became the first person to win a gold medal as a player in Los Angeles 1984 and repeat the feat now as a coach in Rio de Janeiro. China also became the first team to win the Olympics after losing three matches in the preliminary round. The United States defeated the Netherlands 3–1 to capture the bronze medal.

In the fifteenth edition of the games in 2020, the United States faced Brazil for the third final in four editions, only this time they broke the long title drought. Thus the Americans became only the sixth country to win the women's tournament, after Brazil, China, Cuba, Japan, and the former Soviet Union. Serbia got the bronze, beating South Korea.

In the 2024 tournament, Italy made history by winning their first-ever Olympic gold medal in volleyball after defeating the defending champions, the United States, with a clear 3–0 scoreline. The bronze medal went to Brazil, who secured their place on the Olympic podium by defeating Turkey 3–1 in the third-place match.

== Competition formula ==
The volleyball Olympic tournament has a very stable competition formula. The following rules apply:

Qualification

- Twelve teams participate in each event.
- Host nations are always pre-qualified.
- Two teams qualify through the Men's and Women's World Cup (this number was reduced from three prior to the 2016 Summer Olympics).
- Five teams qualify as winners of continental qualification tournaments.
- The four remaining berths are decided in world qualification tournaments.

Competition format

- For the first phase, called qualification round, teams are ranked by the FIVB World Rankings and then divided in two pools of six teams using the serpentine system. The host nation is always ranked 1.
- At the qualification round, each team plays one match against all other teams in its pool. Top four teams in each pool advance, the remaining two leave the competition.
- At the second phase, usually called final round, teams play quarterfinals, semifinals and finals.
- For the final round, matches are organized according to the results obtained in the qualification round. Let the top four teams in each pool be A1, A2, A3, A4 (group A); and B1, B2, B3, B4 (group B). Quarterfinals would then be: A1xB4; A2xB3; A3xB2; A4xB1.
- Winners of quarterfinals play semifinals as follows: (A1/B4) x (A3/B2); (A2/B3) x (A4xB1).
- At the finals, winners of semifinals play for the gold, and losers for the bronze.
- The tournament implements very tight line-up restrictions: only twelve players are allowed, and no replacement is permitted, even in case of injuries.

== Men's tournaments ==
=== Results summary ===
Year	Host	Gold medal match			Bronze medal match			Teams
Year	Host	Gold medalists	Score	Silver medalists	Bronze medalists	Score	4th place	Teams
1964; Details	(Japan); Tokyo	Soviet Union	Round-robin	Czechoslovakia	Japan	Round-robin	Romania	10
1968; Details	Mexico City	Soviet Union	Round-robin	Japan	Czechoslovakia	Round-robin	East Germany	10
1972; Details	(West Germany); Munich	Japan	3–1	East Germany	Soviet Union	3–0	Bulgaria	12
1976; Details	(Canada); Montreal	Poland	3–2	Soviet Union	Cuba	3–0	Japan	10
1980; Details	(Soviet Union); Moscow	Soviet Union	3–1	Bulgaria	Romania	3–1	Poland	10
1984; Details	(United States); Los Angeles	United States	3–0	Brazil	Italy	3–0	Canada	10
1988; Details	(South Korea); Seoul	United States	3–1	Soviet Union	Argentina	3–2	Brazil	12
1992; Details	(Spain); Barcelona	Brazil	3–0	Netherlands	United States	3–1	Cuba	12
1996; Details	(United States); Atlanta	Netherlands	3–2	Italy	FR Yugoslavia	3–1	Russia	12
2000; Details	(Australia); Sydney	FR Yugoslavia	3–0	Russia	Italy	3–0	Argentina	12
2004; Details	(Greece); Athens	Brazil	3–1	Italy	Russia	3–0	United States	12
2008; Details	(China); Beijing	United States	3–1	Brazil	Russia	3–0	Italy	12
2012; Details	(United Kingdom); London	Russia	3–2	Brazil	Italy	3–1	Bulgaria	12
2016; Details	(Brazil); Rio de Janeiro	Brazil	3–0	Italy	United States	3–2	Russia	12
2020; Details	(Japan); Tokyo	France	3–2	ROC	Argentina	3–2	Brazil	12
2024; Details	(France); Paris	France	3–0	Poland	United States	3–0	Italy	12
2028; Details	(United States); Los Angeles							12

=== Medal table ===
Rank	Nation	Gold	Silver	Bronze	Total
1	Brazil	3	3	0	6
2	Soviet Union	3	2	1	6
3	United States	3	0	3	6
4	France	2	0	0	2
5	Russia	1	1	2	4
6	Japan	1	1	1	3
7	Netherlands	1	1	0	2
7	Poland	1	1	0	2
9	(Serbia and Montenegro) Yugoslavia	1	0	1	2
10	Italy	0	3	3	6
11	Czechoslovakia	0	1	1	2
12	Bulgaria	0	1	0	1
12	East Germany	0	1	0	1
12	ROC	0	1	0	1
15	Argentina	0	0	2	2
16	Cuba	0	0	1	1
16	Romania	0	0	1	1
Totals (17 entries)		16	16	16	48

=== Participating nations ===
Legend

- 1st – Champions
- 2nd – Runners-up
- 3rd – Third place
- 4th – Fourth place
- • – Did not enter / Did not qualify
- – Hosts
- = – More than one team tied for that rank
- Q – Qualified for forthcoming tournament

Team	(Japan) 1964	(Mexico) 1968	(West Germany) 1972	(Canada) 1976	(Soviet Union) 1980	(United States) 1984	(South Korea) 1988	(Spain) 1992	(United States) 1996	(Australia) 2000	(Greece) 2004	(China) 2008	(United Kingdom) 2012	(Brazil) 2016	(Japan) 2020	(France) 2024	(United States) 2028	Total
Algeria	•	•	•	•	•	•	•	12th	•	•	•	•	•	•	•	•		1
Argentina	•	•	•	•	•	6th	3rd	•	8th	4th	=5th	•	=5th	=5th	3rd	11th		9
Australia	•	•	•	•	•	•	•	•	•	8th	=11th	•	=9th	•	•	•		3
Belgium	•	8th	•	•	•	•	•	•	•	•	•	•	•	•	•	•		1
Brazil	7th	9th	8th	7th	5th	2nd	4th	1st	5th	6th	1st	2nd	2nd	1st	4th	8th	Q	17
Bulgaria	5th	6th	4th	•	2nd	•	6th	•	7th	•	•	=5th	4th	•	•	•		8
Canada	•	•	•	9th	•	4th	•	10th	•	•	•	•	•	=5th	8th	10th		6
China	•	•	•	•	•	8th	•	•	•	•	•	=5th	•	•	•	•		2
Cuba	•	•	10th	3rd	7th	•	•	4th	6th	7th	•	•	•	=11th	•	•	Q	8
Egypt	•	•	•	WD	•	10th	•	•	•	=11th	•	=11th	•	=9th	•	12th		6
France	•	•	•	•	•	•	8th	11th	•	•	=9th	•	•	=9th	1st	1st		6
Germany	See East Germany and West Germany							•	•	•	•	=9th	=5th	•	•	6th		3
Great Britain	•	•	•	•	•	•	•	•	•	•	•	•	=11th	•	•	•		1
Greece	•	•	•	•	•	•	•	•	•	•	=5th	•	•	•	•	•		1
Hungary	6th	•	•	•	•	•	•	•	•	•	•	•	•	•	•	•		1
Iran	•	•	•	•	•	•	•	•	•	•	•	•	•	=5th	9th	•		2
Italy	•	•	•	8th	9th	3rd	9th	5th	2nd	3rd	2nd	4th	3rd	2nd	6th	4th		13
Japan	3rd	2nd	1st	4th	•	7th	10th	6th	•	•	•	=11th	•	•	7th	7th	Q	11
Libya	•	•	•	•	10th	•	•	•	•	•	•	•	•	•	•	•		1
Mexico	•	10th	•	•	•	•	•	•	•	•	•	•	•	=11th	•	•		2
Netherlands	8th	•	•	•	•	•	5th	2nd	1st	5th	=9th	•	•	•	•	•		6
Poland	•	5th	9th	1st	4th	•	•	•	=11th	•	=5th	=5th	=5th	=5th	5th	2nd	Q	12
Romania	4th	•	5th	•	3rd	•	•	•	•	•	•	•	•	•	•	•		3
Russia	See Soviet Union								4th	2nd	3rd	3rd	1st	4th	2nd	•		7 (Note: Russia's total includes one appearance as Russian Olympic Committee in 2020.)
Serbia	See Yugoslavia							See Serbia and Montenegro				=5th	=9th	•	•	9th		3
Slovenia	Part of Yugoslavia							•	•	•	•	•	•	•	•	5th		1
South Korea	10th	•	7th	6th	•	5th	11th	9th	=9th	=9th	•	•	•	•	•	•		8
Spain	•	•	•	•	•	•	•	8th	•	=9th	•	•	•	•	•	•		2
Sweden	•	•	•	•	•	•	7th	•	•	•	•	•	•	•	•	•		1
Tunisia	•	•	12th	•	•	9th	12th	•	=11th	•	=11th	•	=11th	•	11th	•	Q	8
United States	9th	7th	•	•	•	1st	1st	3rd	=9th	=11th	4th	1st	=5th	3rd	10th	3rd	Q	14
Venezuela	•	•	•	•	•	•	•	•	•	•	•	=9th	•	•	12th	•		2
Discontinued nations
Czechoslovakia	2nd	3rd	6th	5th	8th	•	•	•	See Czech Republic									5
East Germany	•	4th	2nd	•	•	•	•	See Germany										2
Serbia and Montenegro	See Yugoslavia							•	3rd	1st	=5th	See Serbia						3 (Note: Serbia and Montenegro's total includes two appearances as Federal Republic of Yugoslavia in 1996 and 2000.)
Soviet Union	1st	1st	3rd	2nd	1st	•	2nd	7th	See Russia									7 (Note: Soviet Union's total includes one appearance as Unified Team in 1992.)
West Germany	•	•	11th	•	•	•	•	See Germany										1
Yugoslavia	•	•	•	•	6th	•	•	See Serbia and Montenegro				See Serbia						1
Total	10	10	12	10	10	10	12	12	12	12	12	12	12	12	12	12	12	

== Women's tournaments ==
=== Results summary ===
Year	Host	Gold medal match			Bronze medal match			Teams
Year	Host	Gold medalists	Score	Silver medalists	Bronze medalists	Score	4th place	Teams
1964; Details	(Japan); Tokyo	Japan	Round-robin	Soviet Union	Poland	Round-robin	Romania	6
1968; Details	Mexico City	Soviet Union	Round-robin	Japan	Poland	Round-robin	Peru	8
1972; Details	(West Germany); Munich	Soviet Union	3–2	Japan	North Korea	3–0	South Korea	8
1976; Details	(Canada); Montreal	Japan	3–0	Soviet Union	South Korea	3–1	Hungary	8
1980; Details	(Soviet Union); Moscow	Soviet Union	3–1	East Germany	Bulgaria	3–2	Hungary	8
1984; Details	(United States); Los Angeles	China	3–0	United States	Japan	3–1	Peru	8
1988; Details	(South Korea); Seoul	Soviet Union	3–2	Peru	China	3–0	Japan	8
1992; Details	(Spain); Barcelona	Cuba	3–1	Unified Team	United States	3–0	Brazil	8
1996; Details	(United States); Atlanta	Cuba	3–1	China	Brazil	3–2	Russia	12
2000; Details	(Australia); Sydney	Cuba	3–2	Russia	Brazil	3–0	United States	12
2004; Details	(Greece); Athens	China	3–2	Russia	Cuba	3–1	Brazil	12
2008; Details	(China); Beijing	Brazil	3–1	United States	China	3–1	Cuba	12
2012; Details	(United Kingdom); London	Brazil	3–1	United States	Japan	3–0	South Korea	12
2016; Details	(Brazil); Rio de Janeiro	China	3–1	Serbia	United States	3–1	Netherlands	12
2020; Details	(Japan); Tokyo	United States	3–0	Brazil	Serbia	3–0	South Korea	12
2024; Details	(France); Paris	Italy	3–0	United States	Brazil	3–1	Turkey	12
2028; Details	(United States); Los Angeles							12

=== Medal table ===
Rank	Nation	Gold	Silver	Bronze	Total
1	Soviet Union	4	2	0	6
2	China	3	1	2	6
3	Cuba	3	0	1	4
4	Japan	2	2	2	6
5	Brazil	2	1	3	6
6	United States	1	4	2	7
7	Italy	1	0	0	1
8	Russia	0	2	0	2
9	Serbia	0	1	1	2
10	East Germany	0	1	0	1
10	Peru	0	1	0	1
10	Unified Team	0	1	0	1
13	Poland	0	0	2	2
14	Bulgaria	0	0	1	1
14	North Korea	0	0	1	1
14	South Korea	0	0	1	1
Totals (16 entries)		16	16	16	48

=== Participating nations ===
Legend

- 1st – Champions
- 2nd – Runners-up
- 3rd – Third place
- 4th – Fourth place
- • – Did not enter / Did not qualify
- – Hosts
- = – More than one team tied for that rank
- Q – Qualified for forthcoming tournament

Team	(Japan) 1964	(Mexico) 1968	(West Germany) 1972	(Canada) 1976	(Soviet Union) 1980	(United States) 1984	(South Korea) 1988	(Spain) 1992	(United States) 1996	(Australia) 2000	(Greece) 2004	(China) 2008	(United Kingdom) 2012	(Brazil) 2016	(Japan) 2020	(France) 2024	(United States) 2028	Total
Algeria	•	•	•	•	•	•	•	•	•	•	•	=11th	=11th	•	•	•		2
Argentina	•	•	•	•	•	•	•	•	•	•	•	•	•	=9th	11th	•		2
Australia	•	•	•	•	•	•	•	•	•	=9th	•	•	•	•	•	•		1
Brazil	•	•	•	•	7th	7th	6th	4th	3rd	3rd	4th	1st	1st	=5th	2nd	3rd	Q	13
Bulgaria	•	•	•	•	3rd	•	•	•	•	•	•	•	•	•	•	•		1
Cameroon	•	•	•	•	•	•	•	•	•	•	•	•	•	=11th	•	•		1
Canada	•	•	•	8th	•	8th	•	•	=9th	•	•	•	•	•	•	•	Q	4
China	•	•	•	•	•	1st	3rd	7th	2nd	5th	1st	3rd	=5th	1st	9th	5th		11
Croatia	Part of Yugoslavia							•	•	7th	•	•	•	•	•	•		1
Cuba	•	•	6th	5th	5th	•	•	1st	1st	1st	3rd	4th	•	•	•	•		8
Dominican Republic	•	•	•	•	•	•	•	•	•	•	=11th	•	=5th	•	8th	8th		4
Egypt	•	•	•	•	•	•	•	•	•	•	•	•	•	•	•	•	Q	1
France	•	•	•	•	•	•	•	•	•	•	•	•	•	•	•	11th		1
Germany	See East Germany and West Germany							•	8th	6th	=9th	•	•	•	•	•		3
Great Britain	•	•	•	•	•	•	•	•	•	•	•	•	=9th	•	•	•		1
Greece	•	•	•	•	•	•	•	•	•	•	=9th	•	•	•	•	•		1
Hungary	•	•	5th	4th	4th	•	•	•	•	•	•	•	•	•	•	•		3
Italy	•	•	•	•	•	•	•	•	•	=9th	=5th	=5th	=5th	=9th	6th	1st		7
Japan	1st	2nd	2nd	1st	•	3rd	4th	5th	=9th	•	=5th	=5th	3rd	=5th	10th	9th		14
Kazakhstan	Part of Soviet Union								•	•	•	=9th	•	•	•	•		1
Kenya	•	•	•	•	•	•	•	•	•	=11th	=11th	•	•	•	12th	12th		4
Mexico	•	7th	•	•	•	•	•	•	•	•	•	•	•	•	•	•		1
Netherlands	•	•	•	•	•	•	•	6th	5th	•	•	•	•	4th	•	10th		4
North Korea	•	•	3rd	•	•	•	•	•	•	•	•	•	•	•	•	•		1
Peru	•	4th	•	7th	6th	4th	2nd	•	=11th	=11th	•	•	•	•	•	•		7
Poland	3rd	3rd	•	•	•	•	•	•	•	•	•	=9th	•	•	•	6th		4
Puerto Rico	•	•	•	•	•	•	•	•	•	•	•	•	•	=11th	•	•		1
Romania	4th	•	•	•	8th	•	•	•	•	•	•	•	•	•	•	•		2
Russia	See Soviet Union								4th	2nd	2nd	=5th	=5th	=5th	7th	•		7
Serbia	See Yugoslavia							See Serbia and Montenegro				=5th	=11th	2nd	3rd	7th		5
South Korea	6th	5th	4th	3rd	•	5th	8th	•	6th	8th	=5th	•	4th	=5th	4th	•		12
Spain	•	•	•	•	•	•	•	8th	•	•	•	•	•	•	•	•		1
Thailand	•	•	•	•	•	•	•	•	•	•	•	•	•	•	•	•	Q	1
Turkey	•	•	•	•	•	•	•	•	•	•	•	•	=9th	•	5th	4th	Q	4
Ukraine	Part of Soviet Union								=11th	•	•	•	•	•	•	•		1
United States	5th	8th	•	•	•	2nd	7th	3rd	7th	4th	=5th	2nd	2nd	3rd	1st	2nd	Q	14
Venezuela	•	•	•	•	•	•	•	•	•	•	•	=11th	•	•	•	•		1
Discontinued nations
Czechoslovakia	•	6th	7th	•	•	•	•	•	See Czech Republic									2
East Germany	•	•	•	6th	2nd	•	5th	See Germany										3
Soviet Union	2nd	1st	1st	2nd	1st	•	1st	2nd	See Russia									7
West Germany	•	•	8th	•	•	6th	•	See Germany										2
Total	6	8	8	8	8	8	8	8	12	12	12	12	12	12	12	12	12	

== Overall medal table ==
- Defunct NOCs are shown in italic.

Rank	Nation	Gold	Silver	Bronze	Total
1	Soviet Union	7	4	1	12
2	Brazil	5	4	3	12
3	United States	4	4	5	13
4	Japan	3	3	3	9
5	China	3	1	2	6
6	Cuba	3	0	2	5
7	France	2	0	0	2
8	Italy	1	3	3	7
9	Russia	1	3	2	6
10	Poland	1	1	2	4
11	Netherlands	1	1	0	2
12	(Serbia and Montenegro) Yugoslavia	1	0	1	2
13	East Germany	0	2	0	2
14	Bulgaria	0	1	1	2
14	Czechoslovakia	0	1	1	2
14	Serbia	0	1	1	2
17	Peru	0	1	0	1
17	ROC	0	1	0	1
17	Unified Team	0	1	0	1
20	Argentina	0	0	2	2
21	North Korea	0	0	1	1
21	Romania	0	0	1	1
21	South Korea	0	0	1	1
Totals (23 entries)		32	32	32	96

== Most valuable player by edition ==
=== Men ===
- 1984 – Steve Timmons (USA)
- 1988 – Karch Kiraly (USA)
- 1992 – Marcelo Negrão (BRA)
- 1996 – Bas van de Goor (NED)
- 2000 – Bas van de Goor (NED)
- 2004 – Gilberto Godoy Filho (BRA)
- 2008 – Clayton Stanley (USA)
- 2012 – Murilo Endres (BRA)
- 2016 – Sérgio Santos (BRA)
- 2020 – Earvin N'Gapeth (FRA)
- 2024 – Earvin N'Gapeth (FRA)
- 2028

=== Women ===
- 1984 – Lang Ping (CHN)
- 1988 – Cecilia Tait (PER)
- 1992 – Paula Weishoff (USA)
- 1996 – Cintha Boersma (NED)
- 2000 – Barbara Jelić (CRO)
- 2004 – Feng Kun (CHN)
- 2008 – Paula Pequeno (BRA)
- 2012 – Kim Yeon-koung (KOR)
- 2016 – Zhu Ting (CHN)
- 2020 – Jordan Larson (USA)
- 2024 – Paola Egonu (ITA)
- 2028

== Win–loss records ==
=== Men's tournament ===
Team	Matches played	Wins	Losses	Winning percentage
Algeria	6	0	6	0.0%
Argentina	58	27	31	46.55%
Australia	18	4	14	22.2%
Belgium	9	2	7	22.2%
Brazil	117	70	47	59.83%
Bulgaria	60	32	28	53.3%
Canada	31	9	22	29.03%
China	12	3	9	25.0%
Cuba	47	22	25	46.8%
Czechoslovakia	37	24	13	64.9%
East Germany	16	11	5	68.8%
Egypt	23	1	22	4.35%
France	37	19	18	51.35%
Germany	15	5	10	33.33%
Great Britain	5	0	5	0.0%
Greece	6	3	3	50.0%
Hungary	9	4	5	44.4%
Iran	11	4	7	36.4%
Italy	90	58	32	64.44%
Japan	66	36	30	54.55%
Libya	5	0	5	0.0%
Mexico	14	0	14	0.0%
Netherlands	45	26	19	57.8%
Poland	68	39	29	57.35%
Romania	22	14	8	63.6%
Russia	56	38	18	67.9%
Serbia	14	4	10	28.57%
Serbia and Montenegro	22	15	7	68.1%
South Korea	51	16	35	31.4%
Soviet Union	51	41	10	80.4%
Slovenia	4	3	1	75.0%
Spain	13	4	9	30.8%
Sweden	7	3	4	42.9%
Tunisia	38	1	37	2.7%
United States	90	54	36	60.0%
Venezuela	10	1	9	10.0%
West Germany	6	1	5	16.7%
Yugoslavia	6	3	3	50.0%

=== Women's tournament ===
Team	Matches played	Wins	Losses	Winning percentage
Algeria	10	0	10	0.0%
Argentina	10	1	9	10.0%
Australia	5	1	4	20.0%
Brazil	81	57	24	70.37%
Bulgaria	5	3	2	60.0%
Cameroon	5	0	5	0.0%
Canada	15	1	14	6.7%
China	69	44	25	63.77%
Croatia	8	4	4	50.0%
Cuba	52	37	15	71.2%
Czechoslovakia	12	4	8	33.3%
Dominican Republic	21	6	15	28.57%
East Germany	15	7	8	46.7%
France	3	0	3	0.0%
Germany	21	7	14	33.3%
Great Britain	5	1	4	20.0%
Greece	5	1	4	20.0%
Hungary	15	7	8	46.7%
Italy	40	23	17	57.5%
Japan	76	43	33	56.58%
Kazakhstan	5	1	4	20.0%
Kenya	18	0	18	0.0%
Mexico	7	1	6	14.3%
Netherlands	24	11	13	45.38%
North Korea	5	3	2	60.0%
Peru	37	12	25	46.2%
Poland	21	11	10	52.38%
Puerto Rico	5	0	5	0.0%
Romania	10	4	6	40.0%
Russia	48	32	16	66.6%
Serbia	31	14	17	45.16%
South Korea	76	31	45	40.8%
Soviet Union	37	32	5	86.5%
Spain	4	0	4	0.0%
Turkey	17	8	9	47.06%
Ukraine	5	0	5	0.0%
United States	88	54	34	61.36%
Venezuela	5	0	5	0.0%
West Germany	10	2	8	20.0%

== See also ==
- Beach volleyball at the Summer Olympics
- List of Olympic venues in volleyball
- List of indoor volleyball world medalists
- Volleyball at the Summer Paralympics
