= Volleyball at the 1976 Summer Olympics – Women's team rosters =

Volleyball squads

The following teams and players took part in the women's volleyball tournament at the 1976 Summer Olympics, in Montreal.

== Rosters ==
=== Canada ===
- Carole Bishop
- Barbara Dalton
- Kathy Girvan
- Patty Olson
- Regyna Armonas
- Anne Ireland
- Mary Dempster
- Claire Lloyd
- Betty Baxter
- Connie Lebrun
- Debbie Heeps
- Audrey Vandervelden

Head coach

- Moo Park

=== Cuba ===
- Mercedes Pérez
- Imilsis Télles
- Ana Díaz
- Mercedes Pomares
- Lucila Urgelles
- Mercedes Roca
- Miriam Herrera
- Claudina Villaurrutia
- Melania Tartabull
- Nelly Barnet
- Ana María García
- Evelina Borroto

Head coach

- Eugenio George

=== East Germany ===
- Karla Roffeis
- Johanna Strotzer
- Cornelia Rickert
- Christine Mummhardt
- Ingrid Mierzwiak
- Helga Offen
- Barbara Czekalla
- Jutta Balster
- Anke Westendorf
- Hannelore Meincke
- Monika Meißner
- Gudrun Gärtner

Head coach

- Dieter Grund

=== Hungary ===
- Zsuzsa Szloboda
- Gyöngyi Bardi-Gerevich
- Éva Biszku
- Zsuzsa Biszku
- Lucia Bánhegyi-Radó
- Gabriella Csapó-Fekete
- Ágnes Gajdos-Hubai
- Judit Schlégl-Blaumann
- Ágnes Torma
- Katalin Eichler-Schadek
- Emerencia Siry-Király
- Éva Sebők-Szalay

Head coach

- Gabriella Kotsis

=== Japan ===
- Takako Iida
- Mariko Okamoto
- Echiko Maeda
- Noriko Matsuda
- Takako Shirai
- Kiyomi Kato
- Yuko Arakida
- Katsuko Kanesaka
- Mariko Yoshida
- Shoko Takayanagi
- Hiromi Yano
- Juri Yokoyama

Head coach

- Shigeo Yamada

=== Peru ===
- Mercedes Gonzáles
- Maria Cárdeñas
- Teresa Núñez
- Irma Cordero
- Ana Cecilia Carrillo
- Luisa Merea
- Delia Córdova
- Silvia Quevedo
- Luisa Fuentes
- María del Risco
- María Cervera
- María Ostolaza

Head coach

- Man Bok-Park

=== South Korea ===
- Lee Soon-bok
- Yu Jung-hye
- Byon Kyung-ja
- Lee Soon-ok
- Baik Myung-sun
- Chang Hee-sook
- Ma Kum-ja
- Yoon Young-nae
- Yu Kyung-hwa
- Park Mi-kum
- Jung Soon-ok
- Jo Hea-jung

Head coach

- Kim Han-soo

=== Soviet Union ===
- Anna Rostova
- Lyudmila Shchetinina
- Liliya Osadchaya
- Natalia Kushnir
- Olga Kozakova
- Nina Smoleyeva
- Lyubov Rudovskaya
- Larisa Bergen
- Inna Ryskal
- Lyudmila Chernyshyova
- Zoya Yusova
- Nina Muradyan

Head coach

- Givi Akhvlediani
