= Volleyball at the 1972 Summer Olympics – Women's team rosters =

The following teams and players took part in the women's volleyball tournament at the 1972 Summer Olympics, in Munich.

== Rosters ==
=== Cuba ===
- Mercedes Pérez
- Ana Díaz
- Mercedes Pomares
- Mercedes Roca
- Nelly Barnet
- Margarita Mayeta
- Claritza Herrera
- Nurys Sebey
- Miriam Herrera
- Claudina Villaurrutia
- Evelina Borroto
- Mavis Guilarte

Head coach

- Eugenio George

=== Czechoslovakia ===
- Irena Svobodová
- Elena Moskalová-Poláková
- Ludmila Vindušková
- Anna Mifková
- Jana Vápenková
- Jana Semecká
- Mária Mališová
- Hana Vlasáková
- Hilda Mazúrová
- Dora Jelínková
- Ivana Moulisová
- Darina Kodajová

Head coach

=== Hungary ===
- Judit Kiss-Gerhardt
- Éva Sebők-Szalay
- Ágnes Torma
- Emerencia Siry-Király
- Lucia Bánhegyi-Radó
- Ilona Makláry-Buzek
- Katalin Eichler-Schadek
- Judit Schlégl-Blaumann
- Emőke Énekes-Szegedi
- Judit Fekete
- Mária Gál
- Zsuzsa Bokros-Török

Head coach

=== Japan ===
- Katsumi Matsumura
- Noriko Yamashita
- Takako Iida
- Sumie Oinuma
- Makiko Furukawa
- Seiko Shimakage
- Michiko Shiokawa
- Toyoko Iwahara
- Takako Shirai
- Mariko Okamoto
- Yaeko Yamazaki
- Keiko Hama

Head coach

=== North Korea ===
- Ryom Chun-Ja
- Kang Ok-Sun
- Hwang He-Suk
- Kim Yeun-Ja
- Kim Su-Dae
- Jong Ok-Jin
- Kim Zung-Bok
- Kim Myong-Suk
- Ri Chun-Ok
- Jang Ok-Rim
- Paek Myong-Suk

Head coach

=== South Korea ===
- Kim Chung–Han
- Yu Kyung-Hwa
- Yoon Young-Nae
- Yu Jung–Hyae
- Jo Hea-Chung
- Lee In-Sook
- Kim Kun–Bong
- Lee Jung-Ja
- Lee Soon-Bok
- Kim Young-Ja
- Kim Eun–Hie

Head coach

=== Soviet Union ===
- Lyudmila Buldakova
- Vera Galushka-Duyunova
- Inna Ryskal
- Roza Salikhova
- Nina Smoleeva
- Galina Leontyeva
- Lyudmila Borozna
- Tatyana Gonobobleva
- Tatyana Ponyayeva-Tretyakova
- Lyubov Turina
- Tatyana Sarycheva
- Nataliya Kudreva

Head coach

- Givi Akhvlediani

=== West Germany ===
- Erika Heucke
- Ingrid Lorenz
- Traute Schäfer
- Annedore Richter
- Ursula Westphal
- Margret Stender
- Regina Pütz
- Rike Ruschenburg
- Marianne Lepa
- Annette Ellerbracke
- Birgit Pörner

Head coach
