= East Germany at the 1976 Summer Olympics =

- IOC code: GDR
- NOC: National Olympic Committee of the German Democratic Republic

in Montreal
- Competitors: 267 (154 men, 113 women) in 17 sports
- Flag bearer: Hans-Georg Reimann (athletics)
- Medals Ranked 2nd: Gold 40 Silver 25 Bronze 25 Total 90

Summer Olympics appearances (overview)
- 1968; 1972; 1976; 1980; 1984; 1988

Other related appearances
- Germany (1896–1936, 1992–pres.); United Team of Germany (1956–1964)

Athletes from East Germany (German Democratic Republic) competed at the 1976 Summer Olympics in Montreal, Quebec, Canada. 267 competitors, 154 men and 113 women, took part in 139 events in 17 sports.

== Medalists ==
Medal	Name	Sport	Event
Gold	Waldemar Cierpinski	Athletics	men's marathon
Gold	Udo Beyer	Athletics	men's shot put
Gold	Bärbel Eckert	Athletics	women's 200 m
Gold	Johanna Schaller	Athletics	women's 100 m hurdles
Gold	Marlies Oelsner; Renate Stecher; Carla Bodendorf; Bärbel Eckert	Athletics	women's 4 × 100 metres relay
Gold	Doris Maletzki; Brigitte Rohde; Ellen Streidt; Christina Brehmer	Athletics	women's 4 × 400 metres relay
Gold	Angela Voigt	Athletics	women's long jump
Gold	Rosemarie Ackermann	Athletics	women's high jump
Gold	Evelin Schlaak	Athletics	women's discus throw
Gold	Ruth Fuchs	Athletics	women's javelin throw
Gold	Siegrun Siegl	Athletics	women's pentathlon
Gold	Jochen Bachfeld	Boxing	men's −67 kg
Gold	Rüdiger Helm	Canoeing	men's K-1 1000 m
Gold	Joachim Mattern; Bernd Olbricht	Canoeing	men's K-2 500 m
Gold	Carola Zirzow	Canoeing	women's K-1 500 m
Gold	Klaus-Jürgen Grünke	Cycling	men's 1000 m time trial
Gold	Hans-Ulrich Grapenthin; Wilfried Gröbner; Jürgen Croy; Gerd Weber; Hans-Jürgen Dörner; Konrad Weise; Lothar Kurbjuweit; Reinhard Lauck; Gert Heidler; Reinhard Häfner; Hans-Jürgen Riediger; Bernd Bransch; Martin Hoffmann; Gerd Kische; Wolfram Löwe; Hartmut Schade; Dieter Riedel	Football	men's football
Gold	Wolfgang Güldenpfennig; Rüdiger Reiche; Karl-Heinz Bußert; Michael Wolfgramm	Rowing	men's quadruple sculls
Gold	Jörg Landvoigt; Bernd Landvoigt	Rowing	men's coxless pairs
Gold	Harald Jährling; Friedrich-Wilhelm Ulrich; Georg Spohr	Rowing	men's coxed pairs
Gold	Siegfried Brietzke; Andreas Decker; Stefan Semmler; Wolfgang Mager	Rowing	men's coxless fours
Gold	Bernd Baumgart; Gottfried Döhn; Werner Klatt; Hans-Joachim Lück; Dieter Wendisch; Roland Kostulski; Ulrich Karnatz; Karl-Heinz Prudöhl; Karl-Heinz Danielowski	Rowing	men's eights
Gold	Christine Scheiblich	Rowing	women's single sculls
Gold	Anke Borchmann; Jutta Lau; Viola Poley; Roswietha Zobelt; Liane Weigelt	Rowing	women's quadruple sculls
Gold	Karin Metze; Bianka Schwede; Gabriele Lohs; Andrea Kurth; Sabine Heß	Rowing	women's coxed fours
Gold	Viola Goretzki; Christiane Knetsch; Ilona Richter; Brigitte Ahrenholz; Monika Kallies; Henrietta Ebert; Helma Lehmann; Irina Müller; Marina Wilke	Rowing	women's eights
Gold	Jochen Schümann	Sailing	men's Finn
Gold	Uwe Potteck	Shooting	men's 50 m pistol
Gold	Norbert Klaar	Shooting	men's 25 m rapid fire pistol
Gold	Kornelia Ender	Swimming	women's 100 m freestyle
Gold	Kornelia Ender	Swimming	women's 200 m freestyle
Gold	Petra Thümer	Swimming	women's 400 m freestyle
Gold	Petra Thümer	Swimming	women's 800 m freestyle
Gold	Ulrike Richter	Swimming	women's 100 m backstroke
Gold	Ulrike Richter	Swimming	women's 200 m backstroke
Gold	Hannelore Anke	Swimming	women's 100 m breaststroke
Gold	Kornelia Ender	Swimming	women's 100 m butterfly
Gold	Andrea Pollack	Swimming	women's 200 m butterfly
Gold	Ulrike Tauber	Swimming	women's 400 m individual medley
Gold	Ulrike Richter; Hannelore Anke; Kornelia Ender; Andrea Pollack	Swimming	women's 4 × 100 m medley relay
Silver	Manfred Kokot; Jörg Pfeifer; Klaus-Dieter Kurrat; Alexander Thieme	Athletics	men's 4 × 100 metres relay
Silver	Hans-Georg Reimann	Athletics	men's 20 km walk
Silver	Wolfgang Schmidt	Athletics	men's discus throw
Silver	Renate Stecher	Athletics	women's 100 m
Silver	Christina Brehmer	Athletics	women's 400 m
Silver	Gunhild Hoffmeister	Athletics	women's 1500 m
Silver	Christine Laser	Athletics	women's pentathlon
Silver	Richard Nowakowski	Boxing	men's −57 kg
Silver	Christa Köhler	Diving	women's 3 m springboard
Silver	Carola Dombeck	Gymnastics	men's vault
Silver	Gabriele Badorek; Hannelore Burosch; Roswitha Krause; Waltraud Kretzschmar; Evelyn Matz; Liane Michaelis; Eva Paskuy; Kristina Richter; Christina Rost; Silvia Siefert; Marion Tietz; Petra Uhlig; Christina Voß; Hannelore Zober	Handball	women's handball
Silver	Andreas Schulz; Rüdiger Kunze; Walter Dießner; Ullrich Dießner; Johannes Thomas	Rowing	men's coxed four
Silver	Sabine Jahn; Petra Boesler	Rowing	women's double sculls
Silver	Angelika Noack; Sabine Dähne	Rowing	women's coxless pairs
Silver	Harald Vollmar	Shooting	men's 50 m pistol
Silver	Jürgen Wiefel	Shooting	men's 25 m rapid fire pistol
Silver	Petra Priemer	Swimming	women's 100 m freestyle
Silver	Birgit Treiber	Swimming	women's 100 m backstroke
Silver	Birgit Treiber	Swimming	women's 200 m backstroke
Silver	Andrea Pollack	Swimming	women's 100 m butterfly
Silver	Ulrike Tauber	Swimming	women's 200 m butterfly
Silver	Petra Priemer; Kornelia Ender; Claudia Hempel; Andrea Pollack	Swimming	women's 4 × 100 m freestyle relay
Silver	Gerd Bonk	Weightlifting	men's +110 kg
Silver	Hans-Dieter Brüchert	Wrestling	men's freestyle −57 kg
Bronze	Frank Baumgartl	Athletics	men's 3000 m steeplechase
Bronze	Peter Frenkel	Athletics	men's 20 km walk
Bronze	Frank Wartenberg	Athletics	men's long jump
Bronze	Renate Stecher	Athletics	women's 200 m
Bronze	Ellen Streidt	Athletics	women's 400 m
Bronze	Elfi Zinn	Athletics	women's 800 m
Bronze	Ulrike Klapezynski	Athletics	women's 1500 m
Bronze	Gabriele Hinzmann	Athletics	women's discus throw
Bronze	Burglinde Pollak	Athletics	women's pentathlon
Bronze	Rüdiger Helm	Canoeing	men's K-1 500 m
Bronze	Frank-Peter Bischof; Bernd Duvigneau; Rüdiger Helm; Jürgen Lehnert	Canoeing	men's K-4 1000 m
Bronze	Carola Zirzow; Bärbel Köster	Canoeing	women's K-2 500 m
Bronze	Jürgen Geschke	Cycling	men's sprint
Bronze	Thomas Huschke	Cycling	men's individual pursuit
Bronze	Roland Brückner; Rainer Hanschke; Bernd Jäger; Wolfgang Klotz; Lutz Mack; Michael Nikolay	Gymnastics	men's team all-around
Bronze	Michael Nikolay	Gymnastics	men's pommel horse
Bronze	Carola Dombeck; Gitta Escher; Kerstin Gerschau; Angelika Hellmann; Marion Kische; Steffi Kräker	Gymnastics	women's team all-around
Bronze	Joachim Dreifke	Rowing	men's single sculls
Bronze	Uli Schmied; Jürgen Bertow	Rowing	men's double sculls
Bronze	Dieter Below; Michael Zachries; Olaf Engelhardt	Sailing	men's Soling
Bronze	Roland Matthes	Swimming	men's 100 m backstroke
Bronze	Rosemarie Gabriel	Swimming	women's 200 m butterfly
Bronze	Peter Wenzel	Weightlifting	men's −75 kg
Bronze	Helmut Losch	Weightlifting	men's +110 kg
Bronze	Heinz-Helmut Wehling	Wrestling	men's Greco-Roman −68 kg

== Athletics ==
Men's Marathon

- Waldemar Cierpinski — 2:09.55 (→ Gold Medal)

Men's 4 × 100 m Relay

- Manfred Kokot, Jörg Pfeifer, Klaus-Dieter Kurrat, and Alexander Thieme
  - Heat — 39.42
  - Semi Final — 39.43
  - Final — 38.66 s (→ Silver Medal)

Men's High Jump

- Rolf Beilschmidt
  - Qualification — 2.16 m
  - Final — 2.18 m (→ 7th place)
- Henry Lauterbach
  - Qualification — 2.13 m (→ did not advance)

Men's Long Jump

- Frank Wartenberg
  - Qualification — 7.89 m
  - Final — 8.02 m (→ Bronze Medal)

Men's Discus Throw

- Wolfgang Schmidt
  - Qualification — 63.14 m
  - Final — 66.22 m (→ Silver Medal)
- Norbert Thiede
  - Qualification — 61.14 m
  - Final — 64.30 m (→ 4th place)
- Siegfried Pachale
  - Qualification — 60.64 m
  - Final — 64.24 m (→ 5th place)

Men's 20 km Race Walk

- Hans-Georg Reimann — 1:25:13 (→ Silver Medal)
- Peter Frenkel — 1:25:29 (→ Bronze Medal)
- Karl-Heinz Stadtmüller — 1:26:50 (→ 4th place)

Women's Shot Put

- Marianne Adam
  - Final — 20.55 m (→ 4th place)
- Ilona Slupianek
  - Final — 20.54 m (→ 5th place)
- Margitta Droese
  - Final — 19.79 m (→ 6th place)

== Boxing ==
Men's Light Flyweight (– 48 kg)

- Dietmar Geilich
  1. First Round — Bye
  2. Second Round — Lost to Armando Guevara (VEN), 0:5

== Cycling ==
Eleven cyclists represented East Germany in 1976.

Individual road race

- Karl-Dietrich Diers — 4:49:01 (→ 16th place)
- Gerhard Lauke — did not finish (→ no ranking)
- Hans-Joachim Hartnick — did not finish (→ no ranking)
- Siegbert Schmeisser — did not finish (→ no ranking)

Team time trial

- Hans-Joachim Hartnick
- Karl-Dietrich Diers
- Gerhard Lauke
- Michael Schiffner

Sprint

- Jürgen Geschke — Bronze Medal

1000 m time trial

- Klaus-Jürgen Grünke — 1:05.927 (→ Gold Medal)

Individual pursuit

- Thomas Huschke — Bronze Medal

Team pursuit

- Norbert Dürpisch
- Thomas Huschke
- Uwe Unterwalder
- Matthias Wiegand

== Fencing ==
One male fencer represented East Germany in 1976.

Men's foil

- Klaus Haertter

== Football ==
Gold Medal

- First Round
  - Drew with Brazil 0-0
  - Defeated Spain 1-0
- Quarterfinals
  - Defeated France 4-0
- Semifinals
  - Defeated Soviet Union 2-1
- Final
  - Defeated Poland 3-1
- Team roster
  - Jürgen Croy
  - Hans-Ulrich Grapenthin
  - Gerd Weber
  - Gert Heidler
  - Hans-Jürgen Dörner
  - Konrad Weise
  - Lothar Kurbjuweit
  - Reinhard Lauck
  - Reinhard Häfner
  - Hans-Jürgen Riediger
  - Bernd Bransch
  - Martin Hoffmann
  - Gerd Kische
  - Dieter Riedel
  - Wolfram Löwe
  - Hartmut Schade
  - Wilfried Gröbner
- Head coach: Georg Buschner

== Rowing ==
East Germany had 30 male and 24 female rowers participate in all fourteen rowing events in 1976. Each team received a medal.

Men's single sculls – 3rd place ( bronze medal)

- Joachim Dreifke

Men's double sculls – 3rd place ( bronze medal)

- Uli Schmied
- Jürgen Bertow

Men's coxless pair – 1st place ( gold medal)

- Jörg Landvoigt
- Bernd Landvoigt

Men's coxed pair – 1st place ( gold medal)

- Harald Jährling
- Friedrich-Wilhelm Ulrich
- Georg Spohr

Men's quadruple sculls – 1st place ( gold medal)

- Wolfgang Güldenpfennig
- Rüdiger Reiche
- Karl-Heinz Bußert
- Michael Wolfgramm

Men's coxless four – 1st place ( gold medal)

- Siegfried Brietzke
- Andreas Decker
- Stefan Semmler
- Wolfgang Mager

Men's coxed four – 2nd place ( silver medal)

- Andreas Schulz
- Rüdiger Kunze
- Walter Dießner
- Ullrich Dießner
- Johannes Thomas

Men's eight – 1st place ( gold medal)

- Bernd Baumgart
- Gottfried Döhn
- Werner Klatt
- Hans-Joachim Lück
- Dieter Wendisch
- Roland Kostulski
- Ulrich Karnatz
- Karl-Heinz Prudöhl
- Karl-Heinz Danielowski

Women's single sculls – 1st place ( gold medal)

- Christine Scheiblich

Women's double sculls – 2nd place ( silver medal)

- Sabine Jahn
- Petra Boesler

Women's coxless pair – 2nd place ( silver medal)

- Angelika Noack
- Sabine Dähne

Women's coxed four – 1st place ( gold medal)

- Karin Metze
- Bianka Schwede
- Gabriele Lohs
- Andrea Kurth
- Sabine Heß

Women's quadruple sculls – 1st place ( gold medal)

- Anke Borchmann
- Jutta Lau
- Viola Poley
- Roswietha Zobelt
- Liane Weigelt

Women's eight – 1st place ( gold medal)

- Viola Goretzki
- Christiane Knetsch
- Ilona Richter
- Brigitte Ahrenholz
- Monika Kallies
- Henrietta Ebert
- Helma Lehmann
- Irina Müller
- Marina Wilke

== Swimming ==
Men's Competition

100 meter Backstroke

- Roland Matthes — 57.22 — Bronze Medal

Women's Competition

100 meter Freestyle

- Kornelia Ender — 55.65 — Gold Medal
- Petra Priemer — 56.49 — Silver Medal

200 meter Freestyle

- Kornelia Ender — 1:59.26 — Gold Medal

400 meter Freestyle

- Petra Thumer — 4:09.89 — Gold Medal

800 meter Freestyle

- Petra Thumer — 8:37.14 — Gold Medal

100 meter Backstroke

- Ulrike Richter — 1:01.83 — Gold Medal
- Birgit Treiber — 1:03.41 — Silver Medal

200 meter Backstroke

- Ulrike Richter — 2:13.43 — Gold Medal
- Birgit Treiber — 2:14.97 — Silver Medal

100 meter Breaststroke

- Hannelore Anke — 1:11.16 — Gold Medal

100 meter Butterfly

- Kornelia Ender — 1:00.13 — Gold Medal
- Andrea Pollack — 1:00.98 — Silver Medal

200 meter Butterfly

- Andrea Pollack — 2:11.41 — Gold Medal
- Ulrike Tauber — 2:12.50 — Silver Medal
- Rosemarie Gabriel — 2:12.86— Bronze Medal

400 meter Individual Medley

- Ulrike Tauber — 4:42.77 — Gold Medal

4 × 100 meter Freestyle Relay

- Petra Priemer; Kornelia Ender; Claudia Hempel; Andrea Pollack — 3:45.50 — Silver Medal

4 × 100 meter Medley Relay

- Ulrike Richter; Hannelore Anke; Kornelia Ender; Andrea Pollack — 4:07.95 — Gold Medal

== Volleyball ==
Women's team competition

- Preliminary round (group B)
  - Lost to Cuba (1–3)
  - Lost to South Korea (2–3)
  - Lost to Soviet Union (2–3)
- Classification Matches
  - 5th/8th place: Defeated Peru (3–2)
  - 5th/6th place: Lost to Cuba (0–3) → Sixth place
- Team roster
  - Karla Roffeis
  - Johanna Strotzer
  - Cornelia Rickert
  - Christina Walther
  - Ingrid Mierzwiak
  - Helga Offen
  - Barbara Czekalla
  - Jutta Balster
  - Anke Westendorf
  - Hannelor Meincke
  - Monika Meissner
  - Gudrun Gartner
- Head coach: Dieter Grund
