= Hungary at the 1976 Summer Olympics =

- IOC code: HUN
- NOC: Hungarian Olympic Committee

in Montreal
- Competitors: 178 (124 men and 54 women) in 17 sports
- Flag bearer: Jenő Kamuti
- Medals Ranked 10th: Gold 4 Silver 5 Bronze 13 Total 22

Summer Olympics appearances (overview)
- 1896; 1900; 1904; 1908; 1912; 1920; 1924; 1928; 1932; 1936; 1948; 1952; 1956; 1960; 1964; 1968; 1972; 1976; 1980; 1984; 1988; 1992; 1996; 2000; 2004; 2008; 2012; 2016; 2020; 2024

Other related appearances
- 1906 Intercalated Games

Hungary competed at the 1976 Summer Olympics in Montreal, Quebec, Canada. 178 competitors, 124 men and 54 women, took part in 109 events in 17 sports.

== Medalists ==
=== Gold ===
- Miklós Németh — Athletics, Men's Javelin Throw
- Ildikó Schwarczenberger — Fencing, Women's Foil Individual
- Zoltán Magyar — Gymnastics, Men's Pommeled Horse
- Gábor Csapó, Tibor Cservenyák, Tamás Faragó, György Gerendás, György Horkai, György Kenéz, Ferenc Konrád, Endre Molnár, László Sárosi, Attila Sudár, and István Szívós, Jr. — Water Polo, Men's Team Competition

=== Silver ===
- Zoltán Sztanity — Canoeing, Men's K1 500m Kayak Singles
- Géza Csapó — Canoeing, Men's K1 1000m Kayak Singles
- Anna Pfeffer and Klára Rajnai — Canoeing, Women's K2 500m Kayak Pairs
- György Kőszegi — Weightlifting, Men's Flyweight
- József Balla — Wrestling, Men's Freestyle Super Heavyweight

=== Bronze ===
- Zoltán Bakó and István Szabó — Canoeing, Men's K2 1000m Kayak Pairs
- Tamás Wichmann — Canoeing, Men's C1 1000m Canadian Singles
- Tamás Buday and Oszkár Frey — Canoeing, Men's C2 500m Canadian Pairs
- Tamás Buday and Oszkár Frey — Canoeing, Men's C2 1000m Canadian Pairs
- Klára Rajnai — Canoeing, Women's K1 500m Kayak Singles
- Győző Kulcsár — Fencing, Men's Épée Individual
- Ildikó Bóbis, Edit Kovács, Magda Maros, Ildikó Schwarczenberger, and Ildikó Rejtő — Fencing, Women's Foil Team
- Márta Egervári — Gymnastics, Women's Asymmetrical Bars
- Éva Angyal, Ágota Bujdosó, Klára Horváth, Zsuzsanna Pethő, Katalin Tóth Harsányi, Rozália Toman, Márta Pacsai, Ilona Nagy, Marianna Nagy, Erzsébet Németh, Amália Sterbinszky, Borbála Tóth Harsányi, and Mária Vanya — Handball, Women's Team Competition
- József Tuncsik — Judo, Men's Lightweight (63 kg)
- Tamás Kancsal, Tibor Maracskó, and Svetiszláv Sasics — Modern Pentathlon, Men's Team Competition
- Péter Baczakó — Weightlifting, Men's Light Heavyweight
- László Réczi — Wrestling, Men's Greco-Roman Featherweight

== Athletics ==
Men's High Jump

- Endre Kelemen

- Qualification — 2.13m (→ did not advance)

- István Major

- Qualification — 2.05m (→ did not advance)

Men's Discus Throw

- Ferenc Tégla

- Qualification — 61.66m
- Final — 60.54m (→ 11th place)

- Janós Farago

- Qualification — 60.06m
- Final — 57.48m (→ 14th place)

Men's 20 km Race Walk

- Imre Stankovics — 1:32:06 (→ 16th place)

== Boxing ==
Men's Light Flyweight (– 48 kg)

- György Gedó

- First Round — Defeated Said Bashiri (IRN), KO-2
- Second Round — Defeated Serdamba Batsuk (MGL), 5:0
- Quarterfinals — Lost to Payao Pooltarat (THA), 1:4

Men's Flyweight (– 51 kg)

- Sandor Orbán

- First Round — Lost to Said Ahmed El-Ashry (EGY), 0:5

== Cycling ==
One cyclist represented Hungary in 1976.

Individual pursuit

- Gábor Szűcs — 16th place

== Fencing ==
18 fencers, 13 men and 5 women, represented Hungary in 1976.

Men's foil

- József Komatits
- Lajos Somodi Jr.
- Jenő Kamuti

Men's team foil

- József Komatits, Csaba Fenyvesi, Lajos Somodi Jr., Jenő Kamuti, Sándor Erdős

Men's épée

- Győző Kulcsár
- István Osztrics
- Csaba Fenyvesi

Men's team épée

- Csaba Fenyvesi, Sándor Erdős, István Osztrics, Pál Schmitt, Győző Kulcsár

Men's sabre

- Imre Gedővári
- Tamás Kovács
- Péter Marót

Men's team sabre

- Péter Marót, Tamás Kovács, Imre Gedővári, Ferenc Hammang, Csaba Körmöczi

Women's foil

- Ildikó Schwarczenberger-Tordasi
- Ildikó Farkasinszky-Bóbis
- Ildikó Ságiné Ujlakyné Rejtő

Women's team foil

- Ildikó Schwarczenberger-Tordasi, Ildikó Ságiné Ujlakyné Rejtő, Ildikó Farkasinszky-Bóbis, Magda Maros, Edit Kovács

== Modern pentathlon ==
Three male pentathletes represented Hungary in 1976, winning bronze in the team event.

Individual

- Tamás Kancsal
- Tibor Maracskó
- Szvetiszláv Sasics

Team

- Tamás Kancsal
- Tibor Maracskó
- Szvetiszláv Sasics

== Volleyball ==
Women's team competition

- Preliminary round (group A)

- Lost to Japan (0-3)
- Defeated Canada (3-1)
- Defeated Peru (3-1)

- Semi Finals

- Lost to Soviet Union (0-3)

- Bronze Medal Match

- Lost to South Korea (1-3) → Fourth place

- Team roster

- Zsuzsa Szloboda
- Gyöngyi Bardi
- Eva Biszku
- Zsuzsa Biszku
- Lucia Banhegyi
- Gabriella Fekete
- Agnes Hubai
- Judit Schlegl
- Agnes Torma
- Katalin Schadek
- Emerencia Kiraly
- Eva Szalay

- Head coach: Gabriella Kotsis
