= Wrestling at the 1976 Summer Olympics – Men's freestyle +100 kg =

Men's freestyle +100 kg at the Games of the XXI Olympiad
- Venue: Maurice Richard Arena
- Dates: 27–31 July 1976
- Competitors: 15 from 15 nations

Medalists
1st place, gold medalist(s)		Soslan Andiyev	Soviet Union
2nd place, silver medalist(s)		József Balla	Hungary
3rd place, bronze medalist(s)		Ladislau Șimon	Romania

The Men's Freestyle +100 kg at the 1976 Summer Olympics as part of the wrestling program were held at the Maurice Richard Arena.

== Medalists ==
Gold	Soslan Andiyev; Soviet Union
Silver	József Balla; Hungary
Bronze	Ladislau Șimon; Romania

== Tournament results ==
The competition used a form of negative points tournament, with negative points given for any result short of a fall. Accumulation of 6 negative points eliminated the loser wrestler. When only three wrestlers remain, a special final round is used to determine the order of the medals.

Legend

- TF — Won by Fall
- IN — Won by Opponent Injury
- DQ — Won by Passivity
- D1 — Won by Passivity, the winner is passive too
- D2 — Both wrestlers lost by Passivity
- FF — Won by Forfeit
- DNA — Did not appear
- TPP — Total penalty points
- MPP — Match penalty points

Penalties

- 0 — Won by Fall, Technical Superiority, Passivity, Injury and Forfeit
- 0.5 — Won by Points, 8-11 points difference
- 1 — Won by Points, 1-7 points difference
- 2 — Won by Passivity, the winner is passive too
- 3 — Lost by Points, 1-7 points difference
- 3.5 — Lost by Points, 8-11 points difference
- 4 — Lost by Fall, Technical Superiority, Passivity, Injury and Forfeit

=== Round 1 ===
TPP	MPP		Score		MPP	TPP
4	4	József Balla (HUN)	DQ / 5:07	Soslan Andiyev (URS)	0	0
0	0	Jimmy Jackson (USA)	TF / 3:39	Harry Geris (CAN)	4	4
0	0	Yorihide Isogai (JPN)	TF / 1:16	Carlos Braconi (ARG)	4	4
0.5	0.5	Mamadou Sakho (SEN)	17 - 7	Einar Gundersen (NOR)	3.5	3.5
0	0	Nikola Dinev (BUL)	DQ / 5:19	Heinz Eichelbaum (FRG)	4	4
0	0	Roland Gehrke (GDR)	TF / 4:50	Lázaro Morales (CUB)	4	4
0	0	Ladislau Șimon (ROU)	TF / 3:58	Doljingiin Adiyaatömör (MGL)	4	4
0		Moslem Eskandar-Filabi (IRI)		Bye		

=== Round 2 ===
TPP	MPP		Score		MPP	TPP
4	4	Moslem Eskandar-Filabi (IRI)	DQ / 5:12	József Balla (HUN)	0	4
0	0	Soslan Andiyev (URS)	TF / 1:16	Jimmy Jackson (USA)	4	4
5	1	Harry Geris (CAN)	13 - 10	Yorihide Isogai (JPN)	3	3
8	4	Carlos Braconi (ARG)	TF / 2:14	Mamadou Sakho (SEN)	0	0.5
7.5	4	Einar Gundersen (NOR)	DQ / 4:49	Nikola Dinev (BUL)	0	0
8	4	Heinz Eichelbaum (FRG)	TF / 4:42	Roland Gehrke (GDR)	0	0
8	4	Lázaro Morales (CUB)	DQ / 5:06	Ladislau Șimon (ROU)	0	0
4		Doljingiin Adiyaatömör (MGL)		Bye		

=== Round 3 ===
TPP	MPP		Score		MPP	TPP
8	4	Doljingiin Adiyaatömör (MGL)	TF / 1:01	Moslem Eskandar-Filabi (IRI)	0	4
5	1	József Balla (HUN)	10 - 9	Jimmy Jackson (USA)	3	7
0	0	Soslan Andiyev (URS)	TF / 0:44	Harry Geris (CAN)	4	9
3	0	Yorihide Isogai (JPN)	TF / 2:37	Mamadou Sakho (SEN)	4	4.5
0	0	Nikola Dinev (BUL)	TF / 7:54	Roland Gehrke (GDR)	4	4
0		Ladislau Șimon (ROU)		Bye		

=== Round 4 ===
TPP	MPP		Score		MPP	TPP
0	0	Ladislau Șimon (ROU)	DQ / 5:19	Moslem Eskandar-Filabi (IRI)	4	8
5	0	József Balla (HUN)	TF / 3:46	Yorihide Isogai (JPN)	4	7
1	1	Soslan Andiyev (URS)	8 - 3	Nikola Dinev (BUL)	3	3
8.5	4	Mamadou Sakho (SEN)	TF / 4:12	Roland Gehrke (GDR)	0	4

=== Round 5 ===
TPP	MPP		Score		MPP	TPP
3	3	Ladislau Șimon (ROU)	5 - 11	Soslan Andiyev (URS)	1	2
6	1	József Balla (HUN)	6 - 3	Nikola Dinev (BUL)	3	6
4		Roland Gehrke (GDR)		Bye		

=== Round 6 ===
TPP	MPP		Score		MPP	TPP
8	4	Roland Gehrke (GDR)	DQ / 8:40	Soslan Andiyev (URS)	0	2
6	3	Ladislau Șimon (ROU)	5 - 7	József Balla (HUN)	1	7

=== Final ===
Results from the preliminary round are carried forward into the final (shown in yellow).

TPP	MPP		Score		MPP	TPP
	4	József Balla (HUN)	DQ / 5:07	Soslan Andiyev (URS)	0	
	3	Ladislau Șimon (ROU)	5 - 11	Soslan Andiyev (URS)	1	1
6	3	Ladislau Șimon (ROU)	5 - 7	József Balla (HUN)	1	5

== Final standings ==
1. Soslan Andiyev (URS)
2. József Balla (HUN)
3. Ladislau Șimon (ROU)
4. Roland Gehrke (GDR)
5. Nikola Dinev (BUL)
6. Yorihide Isogai (JPN)
7. Moslem Eskandar-Filabi (IRI)
8. Mamadou Sakho (SEN)
