= Wrestling at the 1976 Summer Olympics – Men's Greco-Roman +100 kg =

Men's Greco-Roman +100 kg at the Games of the XXI Olympiad
- Venue: Maurice Richard Arena
- Dates: 20–24 July 1976
- Competitors: 12 from 12 nations

Medalists
1st place, gold medalist(s)		Alexander Kolchinsky	Soviet Union
2nd place, silver medalist(s)		Aleksandar Tomov	Bulgaria
3rd place, bronze medalist(s)		Roman Codreanu	Romania

The Men's Greco-Roman +100 kg at the 1976 Summer Olympics as part of the wrestling program were held at the Maurice Richard Arena.

== Medalists ==
Gold	Alexander Kolchinsky; Soviet Union
Silver	Aleksandar Tomov; Bulgaria
Bronze	Roman Codreanu; Romania

== Tournament results ==
The competition used a form of negative points tournament, with negative points given for any result short of a fall. Accumulation of 6 negative points eliminated the loser wrestler. When only three wrestlers remain, a special final round is used to determine the order of the medals.

Legend

- TF — Won by Fall
- IN — Won by Opponent Injury
- DQ — Won by Passivity
- D1 — Won by Passivity, the winner is passive too
- D2 — Both wrestlers lost by Passivity
- FF — Won by Forfeit
- DNA — Did not appear
- TPP — Total penalty points
- MPP — Match penalty points

Penalties

- 0 — Won by Fall, Technical Superiority, Passivity, Injury and Forfeit
- 0.5 — Won by Points, 8-11 points difference
- 1 — Won by Points, 1-7 points difference
- 2 — Won by Passivity, the winner is passive too
- 3 — Lost by Points, 1-7 points difference
- 3.5 — Lost by Points, 8-11 points difference
- 4 — Lost by Fall, Technical Superiority, Passivity, Injury and Forfeit

=== Round 1 ===
TPP	MPP		Score		MPP	TPP
4	4	János Rovnyai (HUN)	DQ / 7:22	Roman Codreanu (ROU)	0	0
0	0	Richard Wolff (FRG)	DQ / 5:00	Arne Robertsson (SWE)	4	4
4	4	Mamadou Sakho (SEN)	DQ / 3:20	Seiji Matsunaga (JPN)	0	0
4	4	Aleksandar Tomov (BUL)	TF / 1:14	William Lee (USA)	0	0
4	4	Henryk Tomanek (POL)	TF / 2:40	Alexander Kolchinsky (URS)	0	0
0	0	Einar Gundersen (NOR)	DQ / 4:57	Carlos Braconi (ARG)	4	4

=== Round 2 ===
TPP	MPP		Score		MPP	TPP
4	0	János Rovnyai (HUN)	TF / 1:34	Richard Wolff (FRG)	4	4
0	0	Roman Codreanu (ROU)	TF / 3:59	Arne Robertsson (SWE)	4	8
8	4	Mamadou Sakho (SEN)	TF / 1:03	Aleksandar Tomov (BUL)	0	4
4	4	Seiji Matsunaga (JPN)	DQ / 7:14	William Lee (USA)	0	0
4	0	Henryk Tomanek (POL)	DQ / 6:54	Einar Gundersen (NOR)	4	4
0	0	Alexander Kolchinsky (URS)	TF / 0:48	Carlos Braconi (ARG)	4	8

=== Round 3 ===
TPP	MPP		Score		MPP	TPP
8	4	János Rovnyai (HUN)	DQ / 6:51	Aleksandar Tomov (BUL)	0	4
0	0	Roman Codreanu (ROU)	DQ / 5:15	Richard Wolff (FRG)	4	8
4	4	William Lee (USA)	DQ / 8:35	Henryk Tomanek (POL)	0	4
0	0	Alexander Kolchinsky (URS)	TF / 2:33	Einar Gundersen (NOR)	4	8

=== Round 4 ===
TPP	MPP		Score		MPP	TPP
2	2	Roman Codreanu (ROU)	D1 / 7:30	William Lee (USA)	4	8
4	0	Aleksandar Tomov (BUL)	TF / 0:23	Henryk Tomanek (POL)	4	8
0		Alexander Kolchinsky (URS)		Bye		

=== Final ===
Results from the preliminary round are carried forward into the final (shown in yellow).

TPP	MPP		Score		MPP	TPP
	0	Alexander Kolchinsky (URS)	TF / 0:37	Roman Codreanu (ROU)	4	
1	1	Alexander Kolchinsky (URS)	12 - 6	Aleksandar Tomov (BUL)	3	
8	4	Roman Codreanu (ROU)	IN / 0:32	Aleksandar Tomov (BUL)	0	3

== Final standings ==
1. Alexander Kolchinsky (URS)
2. Aleksandar Tomov (BUL)
3. Roman Codreanu (ROU)
4. Henryk Tomanek (POL)
5. William Lee (USA)
6. János Rovnyai (HUN)
7. Richard Wolff (FRG) and Einar Gundersen (NOR)
