= Biszku =

Biszku is a surname. Notable people with this surname include:

- Béla Biszku (1921–2016), Hungarian politician
- Éva Biszku (born 1953), Hungarian volleyball player
- Zsuzsa Biszku (born 1953), Hungarian volleyball player
