= 2010 in Hungary =

- Decades: 1990s; 2000s; 2010s; 2020s; 2030s
- See also: Other events of 2010; List of years in Hungary

The following lists events in the year 2010 in Hungary.

== Incumbents ==
Incumbents
Position	Person	Party	Notes
President	László Sólyom	Independent	until 5 Aug
President	Pál Schmitt	Fidesz	from 6 Aug
Prime Minister	Gordon Bajnai	Independent	until 29 May
Prime Minister	Viktor Orbán	Fidesz	from 29 May
Speaker of the National Assembly	Béla Katona	MSZP	until 13 May
Speaker of the National Assembly	Pál Schmitt	Fidesz	14 May–5 Aug
Speaker of the National Assembly	László Kövér	Fidesz	from 6 Aug

== Elections ==
(Hungary) 2010 Hungarian parliamentary election 11 and 25 April 2010
Party vote
Fidesz–KDNP Viktor Orbán	52.73%
MSZP Attila Mesterházy	19.30%
Jobbik Gábor Vona	16.67%
LMP András Schiffer	7.48%
Others	3.82%
Seats
Fidesz–KDNP	263
MSZP	59
Jobbik	47
LMP	16
Ind.	1

2010 Hungarian presidential election
Ballot →	29 June 2010
Required majority →	257 out of 386
Pál Schmitt (Fidesz) Nominations: Fidesz–KDNP	263 / 386
András Balogh (MSZP)	59 / 386
Invalid	44 / 386
Absent	20 / 386

== Events ==
- Former Prime Minister (1993-1994) Péter Boross gave a controversial interview, where he says the government should inaugurate a so-called childlessness tax because, according to him, procreation is not just a private matter but also a matter of national interest.
- April 11 - The first round of parliamentary elections took place to elect members of the National Assembly. The conservative party Fidesz won an absolute majority of seats, enough to form its own government.
- April 25 - The second round of parliamentary elections took place. The alliance between Fidesz and Christian Democratic People's Party (KDNP) won enough seats to achieve a two-thirds majority that was required to modify major laws and the country's constitution.
- 4 October – Ajka alumina plant accident

== Deaths ==
- 4 January – György Mitró, Olympic swimmer (b. 1930).
- 7 January – Sándor Barcs, politician and sports executive (b. 1912).
- 17 January – Béla Köpeczi, historian and politician (b. 1920).
- 20 March – István Bilek, chess grandmaster (b. 1932).
- 29 March – János Kass, artist (b. 1927).
- 2 April – Dávid Daróczi, journalist (b. 1972).
- 8 April – Aladár Kovácsi, Olympic modern pentathlete (b. 1932).
- 9 April – Zoltán Varga, footballer (b. 1945).
- 17 April – Ferenc Kellner, Olympic boxer (b. 1932).
- 19 April – György Schwajda, dramatist and theatre director (b. 1943).
- 19 April – Albert Szatola, Olympic equestrian (b. 1927).
- 8 May – Andor Lilienthal, chess grandmaster (b. 1911).
- 28 July – István Móna, Olympic modern pentathlete (b. 1940).
- 4 September – Kálmán Kulcsár, politician and jurist (b. 1928).
- 14 September – Kálmán Tolnai, Olympic sailor (b. 1924).
- 17 September – András Harangvölgyi, Olympic skier (b. 1923).
- 19 September – László Polgár, opera singer (b. 1947).
- 1 October – Dezső Bundzsák, footballer (b. 1928).
- 15 October – Vera Rózsa, singer and voice teacher (b. 1917).
- 31 October – János Simon, basketball player (b. 1929).
- 8 November – András Ádám-Stolpa, tennis, basketball and ice hockey player (b. 1921).
- 10 November – Attila Kovács, Olympic fencer (b. 1939).
- 15 November – Imre Polyák, Olympic Greco-Roman wrestler (b. 1932).
- 30 November – Imre Sátori, footballer (b. 1937).
- 6 December – Ferenc Keszthelyi, Bishop of the Roman Catholic Diocese of Vác (b. 1928).
- 6 December – Imre Mathesz, footballer (b. 1937).

== See also ==
- List of Hungarian films since 1990
