= Bánhegyi =

Bánhegyi is a Hungarian surname. Notable people with the surname include:

- László Bánhegyi (1931–2015), Hungarian basketball player
- Lucia Bánhegyi-Radó (born 1948), Hungarian volleyball player
