= 2014 in Hungary =

- Decades: 1990s; 2000s; 2010s; 2020s; 2030s
- See also: Other events of 2014; List of years in Hungary

Events in the year 2014 in Hungary.

== Demographics ==
The population of Hungary in 2014 was 9,833,038. With a sex ratio of 4,703,400 men to 5,174,000 to the nearest thousand. In July 2014 religion Hungary stood at: 37.1% of the population self identify as roman catholic, 11.6% identify as Hungarian reformed church (Calvinist), 2.2% Lutheran, and 0-1% Jewish, 16.7% indicated no religious affiliation, 1.5% atheist, 27.2% didn't provide a response. Religious groups consisting less than 5% include: Greek orthodox, the faith congregation (a Pentecostal group), other orthodox Christian groups, other Christian denominations, Buddhists and Muslims.

== Incumbents ==
Incumbents
Position	Person	Party
President	János Áder	Fidesz
Prime Minister	Viktor Orbán	Fidesz
Speaker of the National Assembly	László Kövér	Fidesz

== Elections ==
2014 Hungarian parliamentary election 6 April 2014
Party	Leader
Party vote
Fidesz–KDNP Viktor Orbán		44.87%
Unity Attila Mesterházy		25.57%
Jobbik Gábor Vona		20.22%
LMP András Schiffer		5.34%
Others		4.00%
Seats
Fidesz–KDNP		133
Unity		38
Jobbik		23
LMP		5

2014 European Parliament election in Hungary 25 May 2014
Party	Lead candidate
Popular vote
Fidesz–KDNP Ildikó Pelczné Gáll		51.48%
Jobbik Krisztina Morvai		14.67%
MSZP Tibor Szanyi		10.90%
DK Csaba Molnár		9.75%
Együtt–PM Benedek Jávor		7.25%
LMP Tamás Meszerics		5.04%
Others		0.92%
Seats
Fidesz–KDNP		12
Jobbik		3
MSZP		2
DK		2
Együtt–PM		1
LMP		1

== Events ==
=== March ===
- 28 March – Metro Line M4 is opened in Budapest

=== April ===
- 6 April – The 2014 Hungarian parliamentary election is held. Fidesz obtains a two-thirds majority in the National Assembly

=== May ===
- 25 May – 2014 European Parliament election in Hungary. Fidesz wins 12 out of the 21 seats.

=== September ===
- 8 September – Hungarian Two-Tailed Dog Party registered

=== October ===
- 12 October – The 2014 Hungarian local elections are held. István Tarlós (Fidesz) is reelected as Mayor of Budapest.

=== Deaths ===
- 25 January – Gyula Sax, chess grandmaster
- 26 January – Lajos Németh, FIFA football referee
- 31 January – Miklós Jancsó, film director
- 4 April – Gyula Szabó, actor
- 22 April – Erzsébet Komlóssy, mezzo-soprano
- 5 August – Angéla Németh, javelin thrower, Olympic champion
- 6 August – Imre Bajor, actor and comedian

== See also ==
- List of Hungarian films since 1990
