= 2009 in Hungary =

- Decades: 1980s; 1990s; 2000s; 2010s; 2020s
- See also: Other events of 2009; List of years in Hungary

This article discusses the year 2009 in Hungary.

== Incumbents ==
Incumbents
Position	Person	Party	Notes
President	László Sólyom	Independent	
Prime Minister	Ferenc Gyurcsány	MSZP	until 14 Apr
Prime Minister	Gordon Bajnai	Independent	from 14 Apr
Speaker of the National Assembly	Katalin Szili	MSZP	until 14 Sep
Speaker of the National Assembly	Béla Katona	MSZP	from 14 Sep

== Elections ==
2009 European Parliament election in Hungary 7 June 2009
Party	Lead candidate
Popular vote
Fidesz–KDNP Pál Schmitt		56.37%
MSZP Kinga Göncz		17.37%
Jobbik Krisztina Morvai		14.77%
MDF Lajos Bokros		5.31%
Others		0.92%
Seats
Fidesz–KDNP		14
Jobbik		4
MSZP		3
MDF		1

== Events ==
=== March ===
- March 21 - Prime Minister Ferenc Gyurcsány announced his intention to resign as Prime Minister.

=== June ===
- June 7 - 2009 European Parliament election in Hungary, and the victory of Fidesz party.

=== July ===
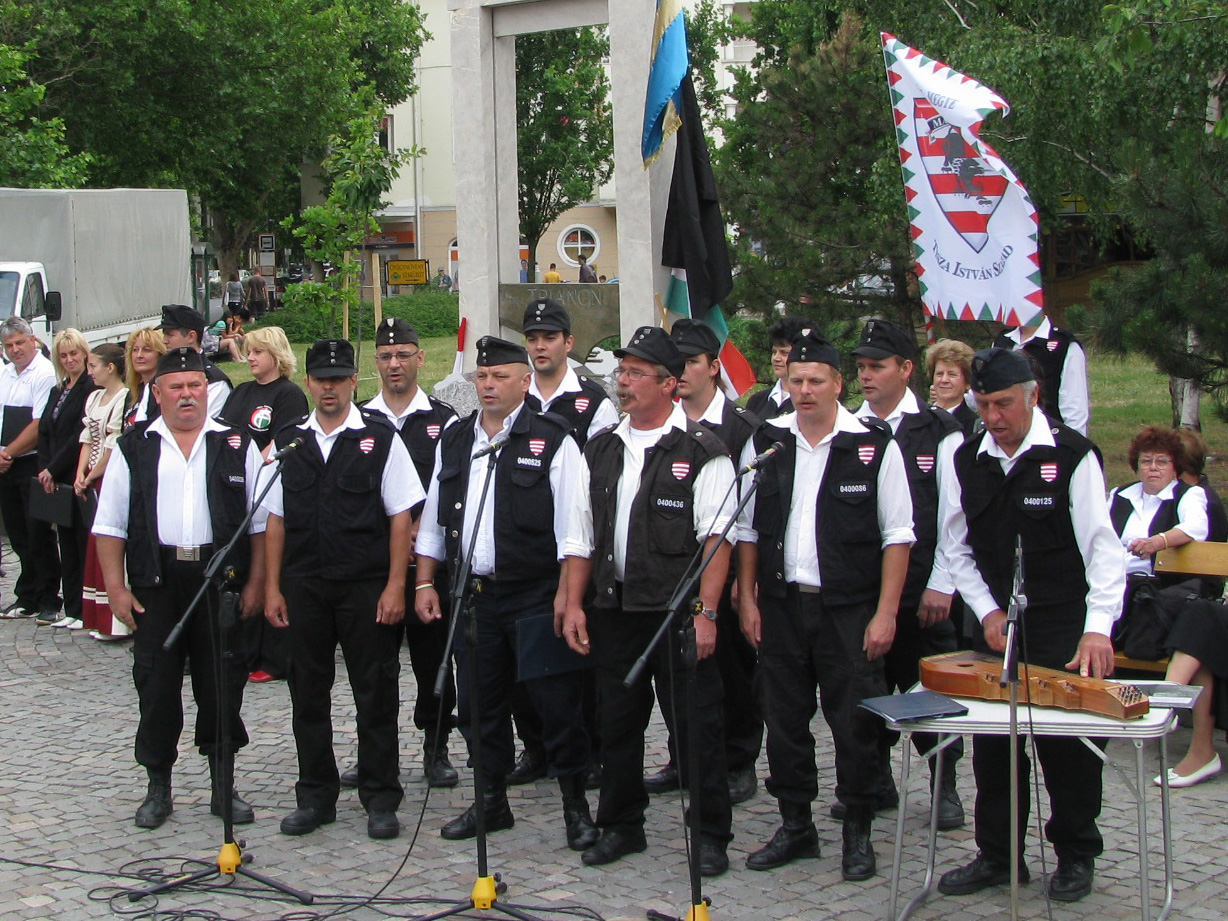
A Magyar Gárda choir sings in Békéscsaba.

- July 2 - the Metropolitan Court of Appeal (Fővárosi Ítélőtábla) disbanded the Magyar Gárda (Hungarian Guard Movement) a patriotic-nationalistic association. It was coined a paramilitary, a party-militia, or – sarcastically – an operetta-guard by its opponents and certain media outlets, even though it was never armed. It was in varyingly close relationship with the Jobbik party in Hungary

== Deaths ==
=== January ===
- 2 January – József Sákovics, 81, Hungarian Olympic fencer.
- 6 January – Róbert Ilosfalvy, 81, Hungarian opera singer.
- 9 January – Pál Németh, 71, Hungarian hammer throw coach.

=== February ===
- 17 February – Gyula Sáringer, 81, Hungarian agronomist.

=== March ===
- 11 March – Péter Bacsó, 81, Hungarian film director, after long illness.
- 12 March – Ferenc Szabó, 88, Hungarian footballer (Ferencvárosi TC).

=== July ===
- 18 July – Pál Regős, 83, Hungarian pantomimist and choreographer

== See also ==
- List of Hungarian films since 1990
