= Gerevich =

Gerevich is a Hungarian surname. People with the surname include:

- Aladár Gerevich (1910–1991), Hungarian fencer
- András Gerevich (born 1976), Hungarian poet and academic
- Gyöngyi Bardi-Gerevich (born 1958), Hungarian volleyball player
- Pál Gerevich (born 1948), Hungarian fencer
