= 2012 in Hungary =

- Decades: 1990s; 2000s; 2010s; 2020s; 2030s
- See also: Other events of 2012; List of years in Hungary

The following lists events that happened during 2012 in Hungary.

== Incumbents ==
Incumbents
Position	Person	Party	Notes
President	Pál Schmitt	Fidesz	until 2 Apr
President	László Kövér (acting)	Fidesz	2 Apr – 10 May
President	János Áder	Fidesz	from 10 May
Prime Minister	Viktor Orbán	Fidesz	
Speaker of the National Assembly	László Kövér	Fidesz	

== Elections ==
2012 Hungarian presidential election
Ballot →	2 May 2012
Required majority →	257 out of 386
János Áder (Fidesz) Nominations: Fidesz–KDNP	262 / 386
Against	40 / 386
Invalid	5 / 386
Absent	79 / 386

== Political and public events ==
=== January ===
- January 1
  - The country's official name is Hungary instead of Hungarian Republic.
  - The new electoral law enters into force.
  - The new constitution of Hungary goes into force.
- January 2
  - While the governing parties were celebrating the new constitution in the Hungarian State Opera House, other parties and civils were protesting against the government in front of the building.
- January 11
  - The Pál Schmitt scientific misconduct controversy begins on 11 January 2012 after the Hungarian news portal HVG published an article.
- January 17
  - The European Commission launches legal proceedings against Hungary. The procedures concern Hungary's central bank law, the retirement age for judges and prosecutors and the independence of the data protection office, respectively.
- January 21
  - Hundreds of thousands march to express their support for the Orbán Cabinet called "March of Peace for Hungary", asking the European Union an unbiased treatment for Hungary.
- January 24
  - István Sztankay becomes one of the Actors of the Nation, replacing Dezső Garas who died on 30 December 2011.
- January 29
  - After resignation of András Schiffer, Benedek Jávor is appointed leader of the Politics Can Be Different (LMP) parliamentary group.

=== February ===
- February 3
  - Hungarian airline Malév ceases operation as its aircraft are grounded due to unpaid debts.
- February 11
  - Compact Disco wins the Hungarian national final for the Eurovision Song Contest 2012, with the entry "Sound of Our Hearts".
- February 13
  - The first indigenous Hungarian satellite MaSat-1 was successfully launched from the Guiana Space Centre. It has been launched together with LARES and other CubeSat satellites, coming from other European countries. With MaSat-1, Hungary has become number 47 on the list of space nations.
  - The National Assembly approves Croatia's join the European Union.
- February 15
  - Miklós Réthelyi, the Minister of National Resources, declares the Tokaj wine region as a historical area and places under monument protection.

=== March ===
- March 1
  - Sándor Fazekas, the Minister of Rural Development, declares many endangered natural areas as protected.

=== April ===
- April
  - Jobbik tried to introduce a bill into the Hungarian parliament that would change the national constitution to allegedly "protect public morals and the mental health of the young generations" by banning the popularization of "sexual deviancy". The legislation was drafted by party spokesman Ádám Mirkóczki. This was to target "homosexuality, sex changes, transvestitism, bisexuality and paedophile behaviour". The proposed amendments would criminalise anyone who "popularizes their sexual relations—deviancy—with another person of the same sex, or other disturbances of sexual behaviour, before the wider public". The penalty would be three years in prison, or five years if 'popularizing' is done in front of minors. The draft legislation ultimately failed to pass. In 2021 Viktor Orban's Fidesz government passed a similar Law to the 2012 Jobbik one, in the form of Hungarian anti-LGBT law.

== Sports events ==
=== January ===
- January 6–8
  - The 2012 European Speed Skating Championships were held at the City Park Ice Rink in Budapest.
- January 12
  - Winger Balázs Dzsudzsák signed from FC Anzhi Makhachkala to FC Dynamo Moscow for a fee of €19 million thus becoming the most expensive Hungarian footballer ever.
- January 13–22
  - Hungary was present at the 2012 Winter Youth Olympics with a 9 member delegation. The team finished 21st on the medal table with two silver medals won by Fanni Gasparics and Csaba Kovács, both in the ice hockey individual skills challenge.
- January 15–29
  - Hungary participated at the 2012 European Men's Handball Championship and finished in the eighth position.
- January 16–29
  - The 2012 Men's European Water Polo Championship was held in Eindhoven, Netherlands. Hungary won the bronze medal after lost to Montenegro in the semifinal and beat Italy to 12–9 in the placement match.
- January 18–28
  - Hungary came third at 2012 Women's European Water Polo Championship by beating title holders Russia in the bronze final. With this result the team also earned a spot for the 2012 Women's Water Polo Olympic Games Qualification Tournament.

=== February ===
- February 16
  - Debrecen was selected to stage the swimming events of the 2012 European Aquatics Championships, after the original host Antwerp withdrew due to financial difficulties.
- February 26
  - Tímea Babos captured her first WTA title in the 2012 Monterrey Open.

=== March ===
- March 20
  - Hungary was awarded to host the 2014 UEFA European Under-19 Football Championship.
- March 22
  - SAPA Fehérvár AV19 became Hungarian champions in men's ice hockey for the 13th time by winning the best-of-seven series final 4–0 over Miskolci JJSE.
- March 26
  - Szolnoki Olaj KK was given the right to organize the Final Four tournament of the EuroChallenge 2011–12 by the FIBA Europe.

=== April ===
- April 6–8
  - The Hungary national team came second in its group at the Olympic Qualifying Tournament therefore earned a spot for the 2012 Summer Olympics.
- April 14–15
  - The final four event of the Hungarian men's handball cup was held at the Sportmax2 arena in Budapest. In the decisive match MKB Veszprém KC beat SC Pick Szeged by a single goal to 27–26 and obtained their 21st title.
- April 15
  - MVFC Berettyóújfalu beat defending champions Rába ETO Futsal Club to 4–0 and took the Hungarian Futsal Cup title.
- April 15–22
  - The Hungarian women's national water polo team successfully absolved the 2012 Women's Water Polo Olympic Games Qualification Tournament and qualified for the Olympic Games.
- April 21
  - Károly Balzsay defended his WBA super middleweight title against Dimitri Sartison by a TKO in the 12th round.
- April 21–22
  - The final four tournament of the Hungarian Cup in women's handball took place at the Magvassy Mihály Sportcsarnok in Győr. Host club and defending champion Győri Audi ETO KC went on to win both of their semifinal and final match, thus winning the title. It was their eighth victory in a row, marking a new competition record.
- April 27–29
  - The Főnix Hall in Debrecen gave home of the Final Four of the EuroChallenge 2011–12. The mini tournament was won by Beşiktaş Milangaz ahead of Élan Chalon. Host club Szolnoki Olaj KK came fourth after two close losses (60–64 vs Beşiktaş Milangaz; 87–94 vs Triumph Lyubertsy).
- April 29
  - TEVA-Vasas-UNIQA captured the Hungarian Water Polo Championship title by winning the third and decisive match of the best-of-three series final to 11–8 over ZF Eger.
- April 29
  - UNI SEAT Győr won the Hungarian Championship in the women's basketball after beaten title holders UNIQA Euroleasing Sopron in the best-of-five finals to 3–2.
- April 29
  - Vasas-Óbuda-Hofeka won the women's volleyball championship after beating TEVA-Gödöllői RC in straight sets in the fifth and conclusive match of the final.
- April 30 – May 5
  - The 18th edition of the Budapest Grand Prix took place at the Római Tennis Academy. The tournament concluded with the success of Sara Errani in singles and Janette Husárová / Magdaléna Rybáriková in the doubles.

=== May ===
- May 1
  - The exhibition race Vodafone Downtown Grand Prix took place in streets of Budapest downtown featuring among others former F-1 champion Jenson Button, Norbert Michelisz and Gábor Wéber.
- May 1
  - Finishing with a 3–3 draw after 120 minutes, DVSC-TEVA overcame MTK Hungária in the penalty shootout (8–7) in the 2011–12 Magyar Kupa final and were crowned as cup winners.
- May 4–6
  - The fifth round of the 2012 World Touring Car Championship season was held over the weekend at the Hungaroring. The first race of the event was won by Yvan Muller of France, while in the second round local hero Norbert Michelisz triumphed.
- May 12
  - By beating Pécsi MFC to 4–0, DVSC-TEVA secured their sixth Hungarian league title with two rounds remaining from the championship.
- May 13
  - Defending champions FTC-Rail Cargo Hungaria retained their title in the EHF Cup Winners' Cup after winning the second leg of the final against Viborg HK to 31–30 – exactly the same result they produced in the first leg – and thus making the aggregate score to 62–60.
- May 13
  - Győri Audi ETO KC finished runners-up in the EHF Champions League after they fell short against ŽRK Budućnost Podgorica on the away goals rule. The Hungarian team won the first leg on home soil to 29–27, while their Montenegrin opponent triumphed to 27–25 in the rematch which was just enough to gain the title.
- May 16
  - Title holders Győri Audi ETO KC successfully defended their league title after beating FTC-Rail Cargo Hungarian in both the first (37–33) and the second match (28–27) of the best-of-three series championship final. This was ETO's fifth straight league gold and ninth overall.
- May 17
  - Hungary was selected to host the 2013 IIHF World Championship Division I Group A.
- May 19
  - Pommel horse specialist Zoltán Magyar was inducted to the International Gymnastics Hall of Fame.
- May 19
  - In the decisive third match of the Hungarian handball championship final MKB Veszprém KC beat SC Pick Szeged to 29–21 and won the title. It was their fifth success in a row and twentieth overall.
- May 21
  - ZF-Eger won the final match of the best-of-five series final in the women's water polo national championship. The North Hungarian team beat BVSC-Zugló Diapolo in the decisive fifth match 12–7 to take the title.
- May 21–27
  - The 2012 European Aquatics Championships was held at the Debrecen Swimming Pool Complex in Debrecen. Host nation Hungary finished on the top of the medal table with 9 gold, 10 silver and 7 bronze medals.
- May 28
  - Szolnoki Olaj KK retained their Hungarian Basketball Championship title after winning the best-of-five series final to 3–1 over Falco-SZOVA KC Szombathely.

=== June ===
- June 3
  - The Hungarian women's national handball team beat Belarus 28 to 21 in the last leg of the 2012 European Women's Handball Championship qualification and advanced to the continental tournament held in December. The match also marked the final appearance of retiring goalkeeper Katalin Pálinger, who played 254 times in the national team.
- June 4
  - Rába ETO Futsal Club swept away MVFC Berettyóújfalu 3–0 in the best-of-five series Hungarian Futsal League final thus retained the national title.
- June 7
  - György Guczoghy, Katalin Makray, József Harmath and Antal Kisteleki were inducted to the Hungarian Gymnastics Hall of Fame.
- June 9
  - MTK Hungária FC Ladies won the Hungarian League thus obtaining their third championship title in a row. Viktória FC-Szombathely, just like in 2010 and 2011, finished as runners-up.
- June 10
  - The Hungary national team beat Norway to 27–21 in the first leg of the 2013 World Men's Handball Championship qualification playoffs.
- June 16
  - Hungary lost 27–31 against Norway on the second leg of the World Championship qualification playoffs, still advanced to the tournament with an aggregate score of 54–52.
- June 16–17
  - The 117th Hungarian Athletics Championships took place over the weekend at the Városi Szabadidőközpont in Szekszárd.
- June 17
  - Tímea Babos won the women's doubles of 2012 Aegon Classic tournament with her partner Hsieh Su-wei, after beating top seeded duo Liezel Huber / Lisa Raymond. This was Babos' first ever WTA doubles title.

=== July ===
- July 29
  - The Formula One Hungarian Grand Prix took place at the Hungaroring. Lewis Hamilton (McLaren) won the race ahead of Kimi Räikkönen and Romain Grosjean (both Lotus).

=== October ===
- October 12
- Following the unsuccessful EuroBasket Women 2013 qualification campaign, Štefan Svitek, head coach of the Hungary women's national basketball team resigned from his position by mutual agreement.

=== November ===
- November 9–11
  - The Budapest Sports Arena hosted the men's ice hockey Olympic pre-qualification tournament. Netherlands won the event after a penalty shootout victory over the Hungary national team in the all-important match and made it to the final qualifying tournament held in February 2013.
- November 12
  - Soslan Tigiev, third placed the 2012 Summer Olympics in the men's 74 kg category, produced a positive sample for the banned stimulant methylhexaneamine, subsequently his medal was stripped and Gábor Hatos was promoted to bronze medalist.
- November 27
  - The 2012 Hungarian Handballer of the Year awards were given to Gábor Császár and Zsuzsanna Tomori in the male and female categories, respectively.

=== December ===
- December 9
  - Hungary finished runners-up at the FINA Men's World Youth Water Polo Championships in Australia, after losing the final against Italy to 8–10. The tournament MVP award was given to Hungary's Toni Német. In the women's competition Hungarians finished second as well, falling short to Greece 5–9 in the decisive match.

== Deaths ==
=== January ===
- 9 January – László Szekeres, 90, Hungarian physician.
- 24 January – Gyula Tarr, 80, Hungarian Olympic wrestler.
- 27 January – István Rózsavölgyi, 82, Hungarian runner, Olympic bronze medalist (1960), heart problems.

=== February ===
- 4 February –
  - István Csurka, 77, Hungarian playwright and politician, Chairman of the Hungarian Justice and Life Party (since 1993).
  - János Sebestyén, 80, Hungarian organist.
- 6 February – István Udvardi, 51, Hungarian Olympic bronze medal-winning (1980) water polo player.
- 14 February – Péter Rusorán, 71, Hungarian water polo player and coach, Olympic champion.

=== March ===
- 18 March – István Suti, 72, Hungarian Olympic equestrian.

=== April ===
- 5 April – Attila Hazai, 44, Hungarian writer, suicide.
- 14 April – Bela Gold, 97, Hungarian-born American businessman and professor.

== See also ==
- Hungary at the 2012 Summer Olympics
- List of Hungarian films since 1990
