= Wrestling at the 1984 Summer Olympics – Men's freestyle +100 kg =

Men's freestyle +100 kg at the Games of the XXIII Olympiad
- Venue: Anaheim Convention Center
- Dates: 8–10 August 1984
- Competitors: 8 from 8 nations

Medalists
1st place, gold medalist(s)		Bruce Baumgartner	United States
2nd place, silver medalist(s)		Robert Molle	Canada
3rd place, bronze medalist(s)		Ayhan Taşkin	Turkey

The Men's Freestyle +100 kg at the 1984 Summer Olympics as part of the wrestling program were held at the Anaheim Convention Center, Anaheim, California.

== Medalists ==
Gold	Bruce Baumgartner; United States
Silver	Robert Molle; Canada
Bronze	Ayhan Taşkin; Turkey

== Tournament results ==
The wrestlers are divided into 2 groups. The winner of each group decided by a double-elimination system.

Legend

- TF — Won by Fall
- ST — Won by Technical Superiority, 12 points difference
- PP — Won by Points, 1-7 points difference, the loser with points
- PO — Won by Points, 1-7 points difference, the loser without points
- SP — Won by Points, 8-11 points difference, the loser with points
- SO — Won by Points, 8-11 points difference, the loser without points
- P0 — Won by Passivity, scoring zero points
- P1 — Won by Passivity, while leading by 1-7 points
- PS — Won by Passivity, while leading by 8-11 points
- DC — Won by Decision, 0-0 score
- PA — Won by Opponent Injury
- DQ — Won by Forfeit
- DNA — Did not appear
- L — Losses
- ER — Round of Elimination
- CP — Classification Points
- TP — Technical Points

=== Eliminatory round ===
==== Group A ====
L		CP	TP		L
Round 1
0	Bruce Baumgartner (USA)	4-0 TF	1:58	Vasile Andrei (ROU)	1
1	Panagiotis Poikilidis (GRE)	1-3 PP	6-13	Ayhan Taşkin (TUR)	0
Round 2
1	Panagiotis Poikilidis (GRE)			DNA	
Final
	Bruce Baumgartner (USA)	4-0 TF	1:58	Vasile Andrei (ROU)	
	Ayhan Taşkin (TUR)	0-4 TF	2:19	Bruce Baumgartner (USA)	
	Vasile Andrei (ROU)	0-4 TF	1:21	Ayhan Taşkin (TUR)	

Wrestler	L	ER	CP	Final
Bruce Baumgartner (USA)	0	-	4	8
Ayhan Taşkin (TUR)	0	-	3	4
Vasile Andrei (ROU)	1	-	0	0
Georgios Poikilidis (GRE)	1	1	1	

==== Group B ====
L		CP	TP		L
Round 1
0	Hassan El-Hadad (EGY)	3-1 PP	6-4	Koichi Ishimori (JPN)	1
1	Mamadou Sakho (SEN)	0-4 TF	2:01	Robert Molle (CAN)	0
Round 2
0	Hassan El-Hadad (EGY)	3-1 PP	9-5	Mamadou Sakho (SEN)	2
2	Koichi Ishimori (JPN)	0-4 TF	4:22	Robert Molle (CAN)	0
Final
	Hassan El-Hadad (EGY)	0-4 ST	1-14	Robert Molle (CAN)	
Wrestle-off for 3rd place
	Koichi Ishimori (JPN)	0-4 TF	2:08	Mamadou Sakho (SEN)	

Wrestler	L	ER	CP	Final
Robert Molle (CAN)	0	-	8	4
Hassan El-Hadad (EGY)	0	-	6	0
Mamadou Sakho (SEN)	2	2	1	
Koichi Ishimori (JPN)	2	2	1	

=== Final round ===
	CP	TP	
5th place match
Vasile Andrei (ROU)	0-4 PA		Mamadou Sakho (SEN)
Bronze medal match
Ayhan Taşkin (TUR)	4-0 TF	1:44	Hassan El-Hadad (EGY)
Gold medal match
Bruce Baumgartner (USA)	3.5-.5 SP	10-2	Robert Molle (CAN)

== Final standings ==
1. Bruce Baumgartner (USA)
2. Robert Molle (CAN)
3. Ayhan Taşkin (TUR)
4. Hassan El-Hadad (EGY)
5. Mamadou Sakho (SEN)
6. Vasile Andrei (ROU)
7. Koichi Ishimori (JPN)
8. Panagiotis Poikilidis (GRE)
