= 2011 in Hungary =

- Decades: 1990s; 2000s; 2010s; 2020s; 2030s
- See also: Other events of 2011; List of years in Hungary

The following lists events in the year 2011 in Hungary.

== Incumbents ==
Incumbents
Position	Person	Party
President	Pál Schmitt	Fidesz
Prime Minister	Viktor Orbán	Fidesz
Speaker of the National Assembly	László Kövér	Fidesz

== Events ==
- 1 January:
  - Hungary assumes the Presidency of the Council of the European Union.
  - A new media law enters into force, creating a government-appointed media authority empowered to require registration of all media outlets, levy large fines for perceived imbalance or insults, deny registration for severe violations, and compel disclosure of journalistic sources.
- 13 January: Large public demonstrations take place in Budapest opposing Hungary’s newly enacted media law.
- 18 April: Hungary's Fidesz-led parliament approves a new constitution, emphasizing Christianity, traditional family values, restricting abortion, and limiting court powers.
- 17–21 August: 2011 ICF Canoe Sprint World Championships in Szeged, Hungary
- 23 September: Hungary establishes diplomatic relations with South Sudan
- 31 December: Parliament adopts a central bank law that alters the appointment rules for vice-presidents, expands the Monetary Council, and enables future consolidation of the central bank with the financial regulator.

== Deaths ==
=== January ===
- 10 January – Miklós Hofer, 79, Hungarian architect.
- 11 January – Zoltán Berczik, 73, Hungarian table tennis player and coach.

=== February ===
- 19 February – Ernő Solymosi, 70, Hungarian Olympic bronze medal-winning (1960) football player.
- 24 February – Attila Takács, 82, Hungarian Olympic gymnast.
- 25 February – István Jenei, 57, Hungarian Olympic sports shooter.

=== March ===
- 16 March – Sándor Arnóth, 51, Hungarian politician, car accident.
- 29 March – Endre Wolf, 97, Hungarian violinist.

=== May ===
- 3 May – Marianna Nagy, 82, Hungarian pair skater.
- 29 May – Ferenc Mádl, 80, Hungarian politician, President of the Republic (2000–2005).

=== June ===
- 10 June – György Szabados, 71, Hungarian physician, pianist, and composer.
- 18 June – Benedek Litkey, 69, Hungarian Olympic sailor.
- 19 June – Rezső Kende, 102, Hungarian Olympic gymnast.

=== July ===
- 4 July – Éva Sebők-Szalay, 62, Hungarian Olympic volleyball player.
- 5 July – George Lang, 86, Hungarian-born American restaurateur and cookbook author, Alzheimer's disease.
- 16 July – Bertalan Bicskei, 66, Hungarian footballer and coach.
- 27 July – Agota Kristof, 75, Hungarian-born French novelist.

=== August ===
- 24 August – Jenő Gerbovits, 86, Hungarian politician, minister without portfolio (1990–1991), tractor accident.

=== September ===
- 3 September – Sándor Képíró, 97, Hungarian World War II veteran acquitted of Nazi war crimes.
- 17 September – Ferenc Szojka, 80, Hungarian footballer.
- 18 September – Imre Varga, 66, Hungarian Olympic judoka.
- 27 September – Imre Makovecz, 75, Hungarian architect.

=== October ===
- 4 October – Géza Tóth, 79, Hungarian Olympic silver medal-winning (1964) weightlifter.
- 7 October – Andrew Laszlo, 85, Hungarian-born American cinematographer (First Blood, The Warriors, Newsies).
- 12 October – János Herskó, 85, Hungarian film director and actor.
- 13 October – Irén Daruházi-Karcsics, 84, Hungarian Olympic silver (1948, 1952) and bronze (1952) medal-winning gymnast.
- 31 October – Flórián Albert, 70, Hungarian footballer, European Footballer of the Year (1967).

=== November ===
- 3 November – Tamás Eszes, 47, Hungarian politician and paramilitary leader, suicide.
- 6 November – Géza Alföldy, 76, Hungarian historian.
- 26 November
  - Judit Bognár, 72, Hungarian Olympic athlete.
  - István Gajda, 30, Hungarian football player, road accident.
  - Iván Menczel, 69, Hungarian Olympic gold medal-winning (1968) footballer.

=== December ===
- 24 December
  - István Jutasi, 82, Hungarian Olympic sailor Olympedia – István Jutasi
  - Zsuzsi Mary, 64, Hungarian pop singer, suicide.
- 25 December – Ferenc Schmidt, 70, Hungarian politician.
- 30 December
  - Dezső Garas, 77, Hungarian actor.
  - Eva Zeisel, 105, Hungarian-born American ceramic artist and designer.

== See also ==
- List of Hungarian films since 1990
