= Ayhan Taşkın =

Turkish wrestler (born 1953)

Medal record

Representing Turkey

Men's Freestyle wrestling

Olympic Games
Bronze medal – third place	1984 Los Angeles	+100 kg

European Championships
Silver medal – second place	1989 Ankara	130 kg

Mediterranean Games
Gold medal – first place	1987 Latakia	100 kg
Silver medal – second place	1975 Athens	90 kg

Ayhan Taşkın (born 6 January 1953) is a Turkish wrestler. He won a bronze medal in the Super Heavyweight class in Freestyle wrestling at the 1984 Summer Olympics in Los Angeles.
