= Koichi Ishimori =

Japanese wrestler

Personal information
- Full name: 石森 宏一 Ishimori Kōichi
- Nationality: Japanese
- Born: 2 December 1961 (age 64) Osaka, Japan

Sport
- Sport: Wrestling

Koichi Ishimori (born 2 December 1961) is a Japanese wrestler. He competed in the men's freestyle +100 kg at the 1984 Summer Olympics.
