= Heinz Eichelbaum =

German wrestler

Personal information
- Nationality: German
- Born: 13 September 1940 (age 85) Oberhausen, Germany

Sport
- Sport: Wrestling

Heinz Eichelbaum (born 13 September 1940) is a German former wrestler. He competed in the men's freestyle +100 kg at the 1976 Summer Olympics.
