= Henryk Tomanek =

Polish wrestler

Personal information
- Nationality: Polish
- Born: 23 January 1955 (age 71) Siemianowice Śląskie, Poland

Sport
- Sport: Wrestling

Henryk Tomanek (born 23 January 1955) is a Polish wrestler. He competed in the men's Greco-Roman +100 kg at the 1976 Summer Olympics.
