= Seiji Matsunaga =

Japanese wrestler (born 1954)

Personal information
- Nationality: Japanese
- Born: 17 August 1954 (age 71)

Sport
- Sport: Wrestling

Seiji Matsunaga (松永 清志, Matsunaga Seiji; born 17 August 1954) is a Japanese wrestler. He competed in the men's Greco-Roman +100 kg at the 1976 Summer Olympics.
