= 2015 in Hungary =

- Decades: 1990s; 2000s; 2010s; 2020s; 2030s
- See also: Other events of 2015; List of years in Hungary

Events in the year 2015 in Hungary.

== Incumbents ==
Incumbents
Position	Person	Party
President	János Áder	Fidesz
Prime Minister	Viktor Orbán	Fidesz
Speaker of the National Assembly	László Kövér	Fidesz

== Events ==
- January – The town Mayor of Ásotthalom László Toroczkai calls for a Hungarian border barrier in the south of the country, to deal with the growing 2015 migrant crisis.
- February – Vladimir Putin makes a working visit to Hungary.
- April – Prime Minister Viktor Orbán calls for the return of the Death penalty in Hungary following the murder of a woman in southern Hungary.
- June – the Hungarian cabinet approves construction of a 4 metres (13 ft) high barrier.
- June – The Hungarian Government buys back Budapest Bank from GE Capital.
- September – Hungary builds the Hungarian border barrier fence on its border with Serbia and Croatia.

== Deaths ==
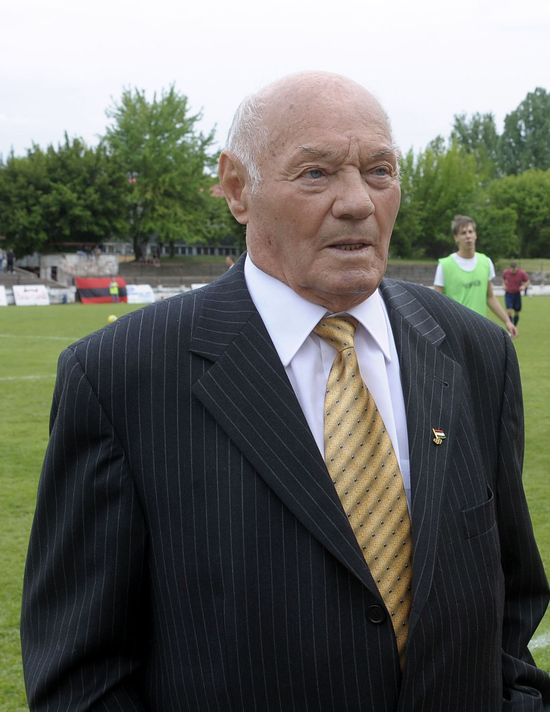
Jenő Buzánszky in 2010. He was Olympic champion from 1952.

- 2 January – István Pásztor, cyclist (born 1926).
- 4 January – János Zsombolyai, cinematographer, film director and screenwriter (born 1939)
- 11 January – Jenő Buzánszky, football player and coach (born 1925).
- 16 February – Olga Törös, gymnast (born 1914).
- 21 April – Ferenc Konrád, water polo player (born 1945)
- 6 October – Árpád Göncz, writer, politician, President of Hungary (1990–2000) (born 1922)

== See also ==
- List of Hungarian films since 1990
