= Roman Codreanu =

Romanian wrestler (1952–2001)

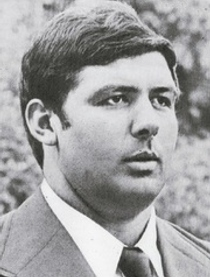

Personal information
- Born: 17 November 1952 Vaţa de Sus, Romania
- Died: 26 May 2001 (aged 48) Arad, Romania
- Height: 194 cm (6 ft 4 in)
- Weight: 146 kg (322 lb)

Sport
- Sport: Greco-Roman wrestling
- Club: Vagonul Arad
- Coached by: Teodor Blidaru
Medal record
Representing Romania
Olympic Games
Bronze medal – third place	1976 Montreal	+100 kg
World Championships
Bronze medal – third place	1975 Minsk	+100 kg
Bronze medal – third place	1978 Mexico City	+100 kg
European Championships
Bronze medal – third place	1974 Madrid	+100 kg
Gold medal – first place	1978 Sofia	+100 kg
Silver medal – second place	1979 Bucharest	+100 kg

Roman Codreanu (17 November 1952 – 26 May 2001) was a super-heavyweight Greco-Roman wrestler from Romania. He won the European title in 1978, as well as bronze medals at the 1976 Olympics and 1975 and 1978 world championships. He spent his entire career with the club Vagonul Arad, and later worked there as a coach.
