= Richard Wolff (wrestler) =

German wrestler

Personal information
- Nationality: German
- Born: 19 October 1948 (age 77) Bad Reichenhall, Germany

Sport
- Sport: Wrestling

Richard Wolff (born 19 October 1948) is a German wrestler. He competed in the men's Greco-Roman +100 kg at the 1976 Summer Olympics.
