= 2013 in Hungary =

- Decades: 1990s; 2000s; 2010s; 2020s; 2030s
- See also: Other events of 2013; List of years in Hungary

The following events took place in the year 2013 in Hungary.

== Incumbents ==
Incumbents
| Position | Person | Party |
|---|---|---|
| President | János Áder | Fidesz |
| Prime Minister | Viktor Orbán | Fidesz |
| Speaker of the National Assembly | László Kövér | Fidesz |

== Events ==
=== May ===
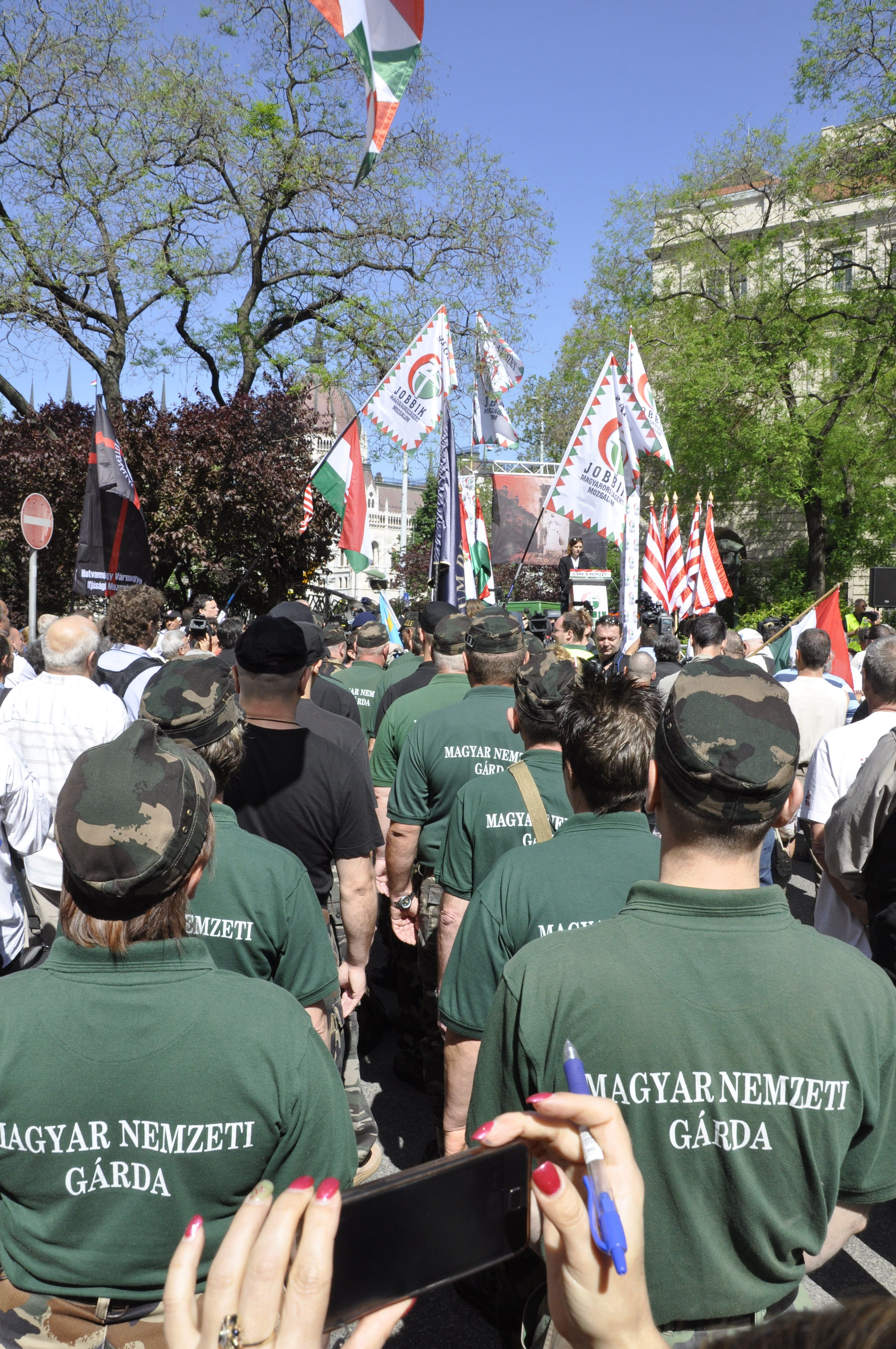
Members of the New Hungarian Guard stand at a Jobbik rally against a gathering of the World Jewish Congress in Budapest, 4 May 2013

- May 4, Jobbik members protested against the World Jewish Congress in Budapest, claiming that the protest was against "a Jewish attempt to buy up Hungary".

=== July ===
- July 15, the government introduced a state monopoly on retail tobacco sales. So-called National Tobacco Shops throughout Hungary became the only places where people could purchase cigarettes.

== Deaths ==
- June 19 – Gyula Horn, politician, Prime Minister of Hungary (1994–1998), (b. 1932)

== See also ==
- List of Hungarian films since 1990
- 2013 in the European Union
