= William Lee (wrestler) =

American wrestler (born 1951)

Personal information
- Full name: William Marlin Lee
- Nickname: "Pete"
- Born: February 10, 1951 (age 75) Muncie, Indiana, U.S.
- Education: Ball State University
- Height: 6 ft 2 in (188 cm)
- Weight: 330 lb (150 kg)

Sport
- Sport: Wrestling
- Event: Greco-Roman
Medal record
Men's Greco-Roman wrestling
Representing United States
Pan American Games
Silver medal – second place	1979 San Juan	+100 kg

William Marlin "Pete" Lee (born February 10, 1951) is an American wrestler. He competed in the men's Greco-Roman +100 kg at the 1976 Summer Olympics.
