= Robert Molle =

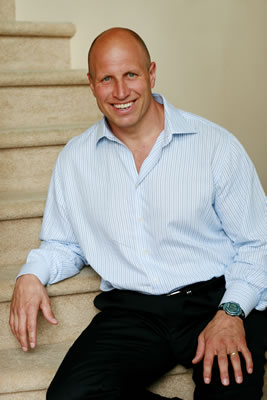
- Molle in 2011

No. 64
- Position: OG

Personal information
- Born: September 23, 1962 (age 64); Saskatoon, Saskatchewan, Canada
- Listed height: 6 ft 4 in (1.93 m)
- Listed weight: 260 lb (118 kg)

Career information
- University: Simon Fraser
- CFL draft: 1985: 1st round, 9th overall pick

Career history
- 1986–1992: Winnipeg Blue Bombers

Awards and highlights
- 2× Grey Cup champion (1988, 1990)

Medal record

Men's freestyle wrestling

Representing Canada

Olympic Games
Silver medal – second place	1984 Los Angeles	+100 kg

Men's collegiate wrestling

Representing Simon Fraser

NAIA Championships
Gold medal – first place	1983 Minot	Heavyweight
Gold medal – first place	1984 Edmond	Heavyweight
Gold medal – first place	1985 Jamestown	Heavyweight
Gold medal – first place	1986 Minot	Heavyweight

Robert Molle (born September 23, 1962) is a Canadian former Olympic freestyle wrestler and professional Canadian Football League (CFL) player.

== Career ==
After finishing high school in his hometown of Saskatoon, Saskatchewan, Molle attended Simon Fraser University in Burnaby, British Columbia. At 6 feet 4 inches (1.93 m) and 275 pounds (125 kg), he joined both the wrestling team and the football team at SFU, and quickly became a standout in both sports. In wrestling, Molle was a four-time NAIA champion.

He was selected to represent Canada at the 1984 Summer Olympics in freestyle wrestling, but suffered a back injury shortly before the tournament that nearly ended his career. Nonetheless, only 18 days after surgery, Molle won a silver medal for Canada as a Super Heavyweight wrestler at the 1984 Olympics in Los Angeles. American wrestler Bruce Baumgartner defeated Molle to win the gold medal.

Molle was drafted by the Winnipeg Blue Bombers in the first round with the ninth overall pick of the 1985 CFL draft. On November 27, 1988, he hoisted a Grey Cup as a member of the Blue Bombers' offensive line. He won another Grey Cup in 1990 and eventually became a captain of the Blue Bombers. On September 25, 2016, he was inducted into the Blue Bombers Hall of Fame.

He is also a member of the Simon Fraser University Hall of Fame (1990), the NAIA (National Association of Intercollegiate Athletics) Hall of Fame (1991), the Canadian Wrestling Hall of Fame (1992), the Saskatoon Sports Hall of Fame (1993) and the Saskatchewan Sports Hall of Fame (1995).
