= Lázaro Morales =

Cuban wrestler (born 1955)

Personal information
- Nationality: Cuban
- Born: 25 October 1955 (age 70)

Sport
- Sport: Wrestling

Lázaro Morales (born 25 October 1955) is a Cuban wrestler. He competed in the men's freestyle +100 kg at the 1976 Summer Olympics.
