= János Rovnyai =

Hungarian wrestler

Personal information
- Nationality: Hungarian
- Born: 28 June 1951 (age 75) Leányfalu, Hungary

Sport
- Sport: Wrestling

János Rovnyai (born 28 June 1951) is a Hungarian wrestler. He competed in the men's Greco-Roman +100 kg at the 1976 Summer Olympics.
