= Imre Bajor =

Hungarian actor and comedian

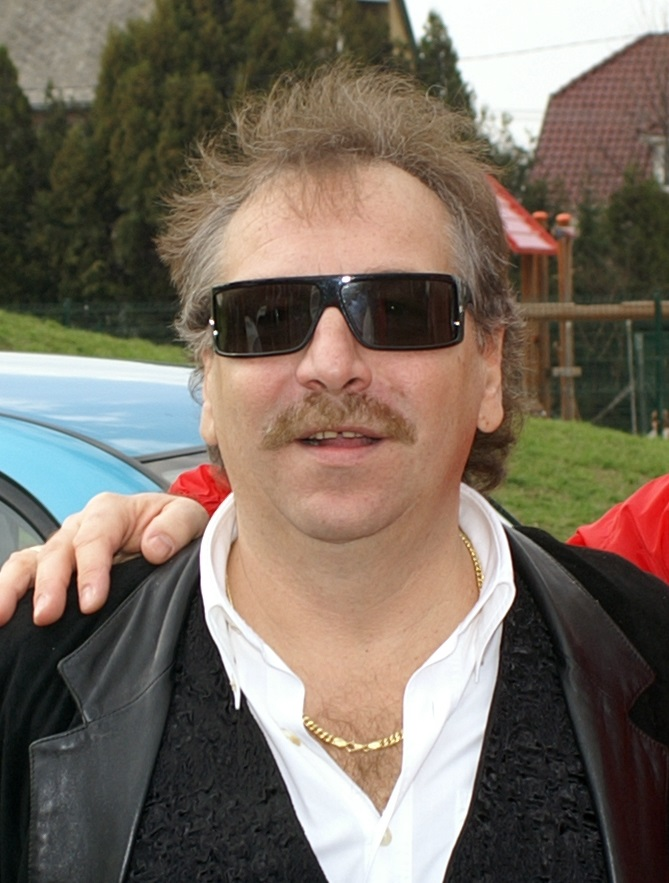
- Imre Bajor in 2005
- Born: 9 March 1957; Budapest, Hungary
- Died: 6 August 2014 (aged 57); Budapest, Hungary

Imre Bajor (9 March 1957 – 6 August 2014) was a Hungarian actor and comedian.
