= Annedore Richter =

German volleyball player (born 1948)

Personal information
- Nationality: German
- Born: 14 November 1948 (age 76); Münster, Germany

Sport
- Sport: Volleyball

Annedore Richter (born 14 November 1948) is a German volleyball player. She competed in the women's tournament at the 1972 Summer Olympics.
