= Gerhard Lauke =

German cyclist

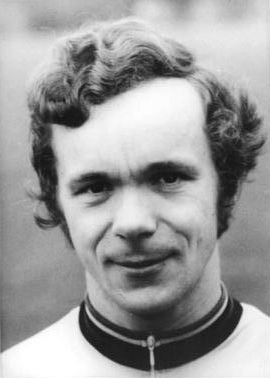

Personal information
- Born: 25 February 1952 (age 74) Ziltendorf, East Germany

Cycling career
- Sport: Cycling
- Discipline: Track
- Role: Rider

Gerhard Lauke (born 25 February 1952) is a German former cyclist. He competed for East Germany in the individual road race and team time trial events at the 1976 Summer Olympics.
