= Ursula Westphal =

German volleyball player (born 1949)

Personal information
- Nationality: German
- Born: 8 April 1949 (age 75); Wilhelmshaven, Germany

Sport
- Sport: Volleyball

Ursula Westphal (born 8 April 1949) is a German volleyball player. She competed in the women's tournament at the 1972 Summer Olympics.
