= Ludmila Vindušková =

Czech volleyball player (born 1949)

Personal information
- Nationality: Czech
- Born: 3 January 1949 (age 76); Světlá nad Sázavou, Czechoslovakia

Sport
- Sport: Volleyball

Ludmila Vindušková (born 3 January 1949) is a Czech volleyball player. She competed in the women's tournament at the 1972 Summer Olympics.
