= György Schwajda =

Hungarian dramatist and theater director

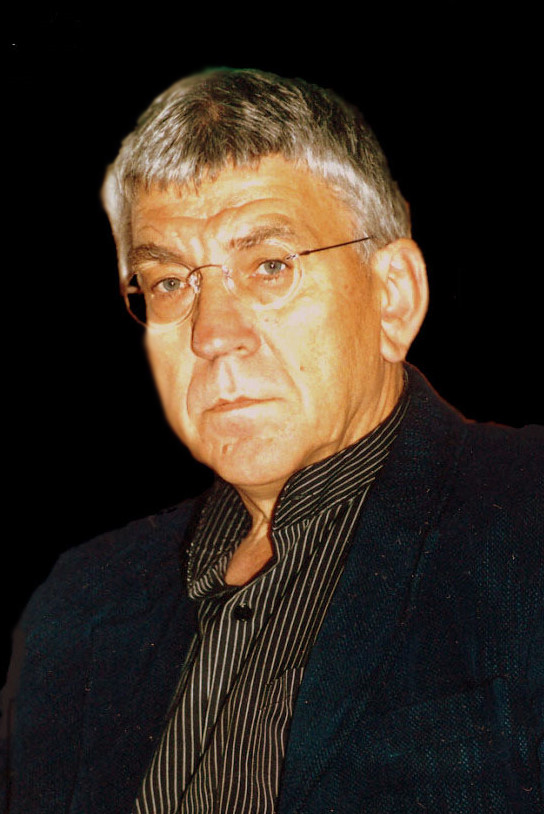
György Schwajda

György Schwajda (24 March 1943 in Kispest – 19 April 2010 in Kaposvar) was a Hungarian dramatist and theater director. Schwajda wrote several dramas and was the theater director of the city theater in Kaposvar.

He died after a long serious illness in Kaposvar, Hungary.
