= Karl-Dietrich Diers =

German cyclist

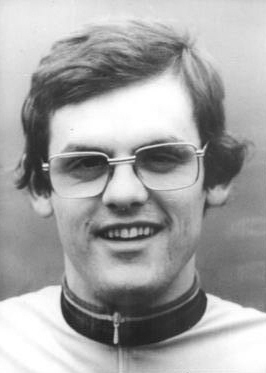

Personal information
- Born: 9 May 1953 (age 73) Halle, Bezirk Halle, East Germany

Cycling career
- Sport: Cycling

Karl-Dietrich Diers (born 9 May 1953) is a German former cyclist. He competed for East Germany in the individual road race and team time trial events at the 1976 Summer Olympics.
