= Ivana Moulisová =

Czech volleyball player (born 1953)

Personal information
- Nationality: Czech
- Born: 14 July 1953 (age 71)

Sport
- Sport: Volleyball

Ivana Moulisová (born 14 July 1953) is a Czech volleyball player. She competed in the women's tournament at the 1972 Summer Olympics.
