= Hans-Joachim Hartnick =

East German cyclist (born 1955)

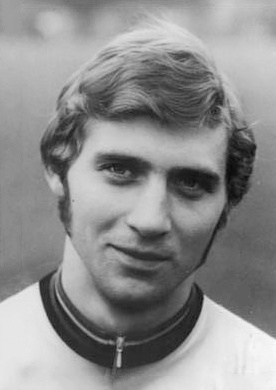
- Hans-Joachim Hartnick in 1977

Personal information
- Born: 12 January 1955 (age 71) Wormlage, Bezirk Cottbus, East Germany
- Height: 1.80 m (5 ft 11 in)
- Weight: 76 kg (168 lb)

Cycling career
- Sport: Cycling
Medal record
Representing East Germany
Olympic Games
Silver medal – second place	1980 Moscow	Team time trial
World Championships
Bronze medal – third place	1974 Montreal	Team time trial
Gold medal – first place	1979 Valkenburg	Team time trial

Hans-Joachim Hartnick (born 12 January 1955) is a retired East German cyclist. He had his best achievements in the 100 km team time trial. In this discipline he won a silver medal at the 1980 Summer Olympics, a bronze medal at the world championships in 1974 and a gold medal at the world championships in 1979; his team finished in 10th place at the 1976 Summer Olympics.

Individually, he won the following races:

- DDR-Rundfahrt, 1974 and 1975
- Hill Climb Championship, 1975
- Korneuburg, 1975
- Peace Race, 1976
- Rund um Berlin, 1977
- Thüringen Rundfahrt der U23, 1979
- Tour de l'Yonne, 1981

He finished in second place in the Peace Race in 1975.
