= Regina Pütz =

German volleyball player (born 1950)

Personal information
- Nationality: German
- Born: 13 April 1950 (age 74); Bonn, Germany

Sport
- Sport: Volleyball

Regina Pütz (born 13 April 1950) is a German volleyball player. She competed in the women's tournament at the 1972 Summer Olympics.
