= Rike Ruschenburg =

German volleyball player (born 1946)

Personal information
- Nationality: German
- Born: 20 June 1946 (age 79) Moers, Germany

Sport
- Sport: Volleyball

Rike Ruschenburg (born 20 June 1946, died 17.11.2025, see https://www.mittelbayerische-trauer.de/traueranzeige/rike-drauschke) is a German volleyball player. She competed in the women's tournament at the 1972 Summer Olympics.
