= Darina Kodajová =

Slovak volleyball player (born 1950)

Personal information
- Nationality: Slovak
- Born: 26 June 1950 (age 74); Bratislava, Czechoslovakia

Sport
- Sport: Volleyball

Darina Kodajová (born 26 June 1950) is a Slovak volleyball player. She competed in the women's tournament at the 1972 Summer Olympics.
