= József Balla =

Hungarian wrestler (1955–2003)

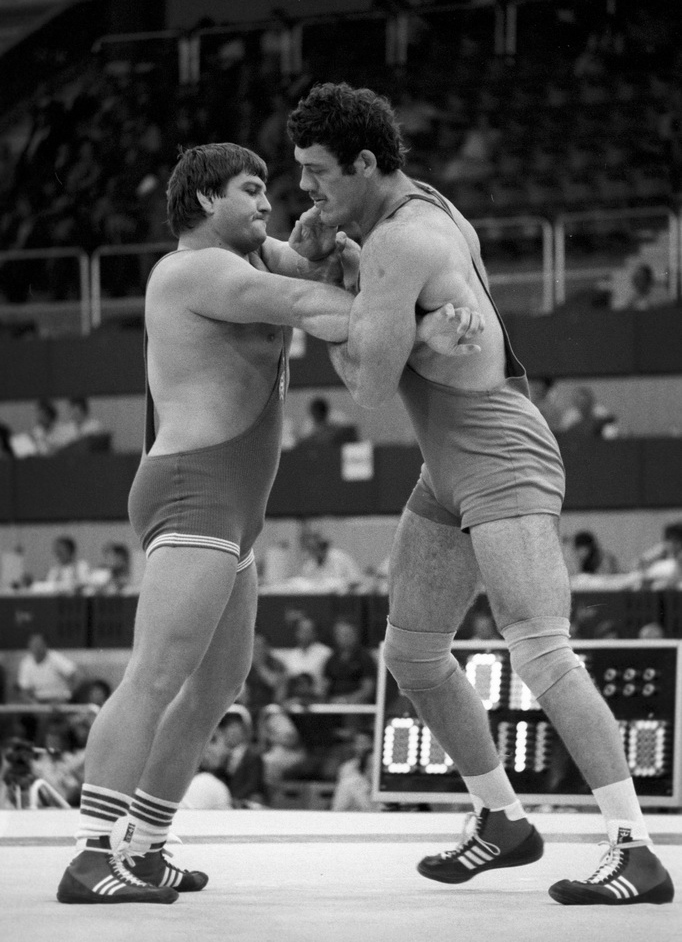
- Balla (left) at the 1980 Olympics

Personal information
- Born: 27 July 1955 Szőreg, Hungary
- Died: 18 March 2003 (aged 47) Kecskemét, Hungary
- Height: 190 cm (6 ft 3 in)
- Weight: 120 kg (265 lb)

Sport
- Sport: Freestyle wrestling
- Club: Ferencvárosi TC, Budapest
Medal record
Representing Hungary
Olympic Games
Silver medal – second place	1976 Montreal	+100 kg
Silver medal – second place	1980 Moscow	+100 kg
World Championships
Bronze medal – third place	1977 Lausanne	+100 kg
Silver medal – second place	1985 Budapest	+100 kg
European Championships
Silver medal – second place	1975 Ludwigshafen	+100 kg
Silver medal – second place	1978 Sofia	+100 kg
Silver medal – second place	1981 Łódź	+100 kg
Gold medal – first place	1983 Budapest	+100 kg

József Balla (27 July 1955 – 18 March 2003) was a heavyweight freestyle wrestler from Hungary. He won silver medals at the 1976 and 1980 Olympics, 1985 World Championships, and 1975, 1978 and 1981 European championships. He won the European championships in 1983.

== Personal life ==
Balla was born in Szőreg on 27 July 1955. He died in Kecskemét on 17 March 2003.
