= Ingrid Lorenz =

German volleyball player (born 1951)

Personal information
- Nationality: German
- Born: 14 June 1951 (age 74) Hanover, Germany

Sport
- Sport: Volleyball

Achievements and titles
- Olympic finals: 1972 Summer Olympics

Ingrid Lorenz (born 14 June 1951) is a German volleyball player. She competed in the women's tournament at the 1972 Summer Olympics.
