= László Szekeres =

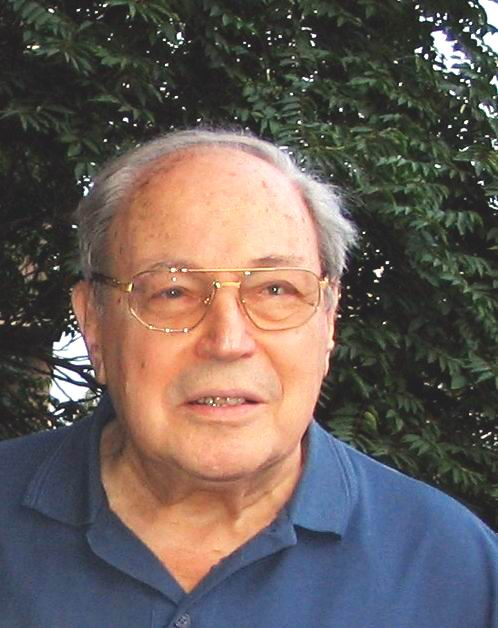

László Szekeres (July 4, 1921 – January 9, 2012) was a Hungarian professor at the Institute of Pharmacology and Therapeutics, Medical Faculty of the University of Szeged, Hungary. His research contributed to the development of cardiac drugs.

== Education ==
He graduated from high school in Győr and in 1949 he graduated at the Medical School of the University of Pécs. He worked as intern in the Institute of Pharmacology at the same university. His original plan was to become a clinical physician, but after graduation he decided to stay in the Institute of Pharmacology. In 1959 and 1960 he did a few months postgraduate work in Moscow and Leningrad (now St. Petersburg) in the Pharmacological Institutes of the USSR Academy of Medical Sciences. In 1960-61 he completed a Riker fellowship at the Department of Pharmacology of the University of Oxford. In 1963 he spent two months in the "Istituto Superiore di Sanitá" in Rome to study methods concerning cerebral circulation with the Nobel-prize laureate Professor Bovet. In 1982 he studied at the National Institute of Health and at the Food and Drug Administration in Washington, DC.

== Work ==
He researched cardiac metabolic changes due to hypoxia, ischaemia, hypothermia and cardiovascular drugs. He became interested in experimental cardiac arrhythmia and antiarrhythmic drugs, area rather unexplored at that time. Worked with E. M. Vaughan Williams comparing the electrophysiological actions of different antiarrhythmic drugs. The result of their cooperation formed the basis of 'Vaughan Williams Classification' of antiarrhythmic drugs. Returning home he developed new models for the assessment of antiarrhythmic action, which were soon widely applied. He also studied the electrophysiologic changes due to drugs, ischemia or heart failure. The results and data on experimental cardiac arrhythmias and antiarrhythmic drugs were summarized with his co-authorship in the first comprehensive monograph written on this topic.

Search for methods to prevent sudden cardiac death due to acute myocardial infarction. First a new, (widely appreciated) model of experimental angina pectoris was developed. With the help of this method a number of antianginal and other cardiac drugs as well as their effect on hemodynamic and cardiac metabolic changes were studied. In addition it was for the first time shown that reorganization of the phospholipid structure of the myocardial membrane by linoleic acid-rich diet offers a marked protection against life-threatening arrhythmias due to coronary artery occlusion in rats. All these results and literature on epidemiology and pathophysiology of sudden cardiac death as well as on possible therapeutic measures were summarized in a monograph.

He studied the effects of prostacyclin and its stable analogue: 7-oxo-prostacyclin in the experimental dog model of angina pectoris. A detailed analysis of the phenomenon of delayed anti-anginal action revealed that PgI2-pretreatment protected against consequences of ischaemia, such as early morphological changes, early and late postocclusion and reperfusion arrhythmias due to coronary artery occlusion or ouabain intoxication. This endogenous 'self-defense' due to delayed adaptation to stress is promising also as a future trend in therapy since it works in experimental atherosclerosis too. Exploratory investigations suggest that the phenomenon is not confined to the heart only, vessels and possibly other organs could be also involved. He was the founder of the "Szeged school of cardiovascular pharmacology" of international reputation, a number of his former pupils and co-workers became professors and leading scientists, and among them six became chairmen of Departments of Pharmacology in Hungary.

== Research ==
His major scientific interests and contributions included the first comprehensive analysis of the mode of action of antiarrhythmic drugs, the elucidation of the mechanism of cardiac arrhythmias, and that of the antiarrhythmic and anti-anginal drugs. He also developed several "in vivo" models of experimental arrhythmias as well as of that of angina pectoris for testing antiarrhythmic and anti-anginal drugs. Professor Szekeres also contributed to the discovery of drug induced delayed cardiac adaptation to stress. He was interested in the pathomechanism and pharmacological prevention of cardiac arrhythmias and the consequences of myocardial ischaemia.

== Personal life ==
He married Lenke Rudas, former associate professor in the Department of Dentistry of the University of Pécs and later of the University of Szeged (Died 1990). They had two daughters. In 1993 he married Ibolya Pamuk.

== Editorial boards ==
- J. Cardiovascular Pharmacology, since foundation (1974–1988)
- European J. Pharmacology, since foundation (1966–1975)
- Progress in Pharmacology, since foundation (1974–1988)
- Basic Research in Cardiology, since foundation (from Zeitschrift für Kreislaufforschung) (1978–1994)
- Cardioscience, since foundation (1989–1996)
- Rhythmology, since foundation (1987–1996)
- Canadian J. Cardiology (1987–1998)
- British J. Pharmacology,(Corresponding editor, 1981–1998)
- Archives Internationales de Pharmacodynamie et de Thérapie, since 1975.
- Journal de Pharmacologie (Paris), since 1985
- Pharmacological Research Communications, Societá Italiana di Farmacologia;since 1976)
- Acta Medica Hungarica since 1974

== Awards and distinctions ==
- 1964 'Carolus Linnaeus' Medal of the Karolinska Institutet (Stockholm)
- 1976 'N.P.Krawkow' Medal of the USSR Medical Academy
- 1980 Bronze Medal of the Helsinki University
- 1978 'Jancsó Miklós' Award and Medal of the Szeged University Medical School
- 1978 Hungarian State Gold Medal of the "Order of Labor"
- 1979 and 1988 Awards of the Hungarian Ministry of Education and Culture for high standard textbook & monograph
- 1984 "Issekutz Béla" Award & medal of the Hungarian Pharmacological Society
- 1987 "Napoleon Czybulsky" Medal of the Polish Physiological Society
- 1990 the first "Gábor György"Award and Medal of the Hungarian Society of Cardiology
- 2001 the first "Pro Universitate" Award and Medal of the University of Szeged
- 2001 Medal of Merit of ISHR
- 2002 the first "Howard Morgan Award for Distinguished Achievements in Cardiovascular Sciences" from the International Academy of Cardiovascular Sciences.
- In 2002 at a satellite meeting of ISHR in Stará Lesna (Slovakia) as well as at the XXII. Congress of the European section of ISHR in Szeged he was honoured by denominating the symposia dealing with cardiac arrhythmia

== Selected publications ==
=== Monographs ===
- Szekeres L., Papp J.Gy.: "Experimental Cardiac Arrhythmias and Antiarrhythmic Drugs". Akadémiai kiadó Budapest 1971(448 pp)
- Szekeres L.: "Orvosi Gyógyszertan" (Textbook of Medical Pharmacology in Hungarian), Medicina Könyvkiadó, Budapest 1980, 693 pp.
- Szekeres L.: "Sudden Death due to Acute Myocardial Infarction" CRC Press, Inc. Boca Raton, Florida, 1986, 288 pp.
- Solti F., Szabó Z., Szekeres L.: "Aritmiák" ("Arrhythmias" in Hungarian) Medicina Könyvkiadó (Publishing House), Budapest 1987, 181 pp.
- Szekeres László :A szívglykozidoktól a gyógyszeres stressadaptációig. Egy ötvenéves kutatómunka tanulságai. (From the cardiac glycosides to the pharmacological adaptation to stress. The lesson of 50 years research activity. Studia Physiologica 7. Ed: S. Juhász –Nagy, Scientia Kiadó, Budapest. 2000, (95.pp)

=== Edited books ===
- Szekeres L.: "Adrenergic Activators and Inhibitors";Handbook of Experimental Pharmacology, Springer Verlag, Berlin, 1980. Vol. 54/1,1210 pp., Vol. 54/2, 936 pp,
- Szekeres L., Papp J.Gy.: "Pharmacology of Smooth Muscle". Handbook of Experimental Pharmacology, Springer Verlag, Berlin, Heidelberg, New York, London, Paris, Tokyo, Hong Kong, Barcelona, Budapest, 1980. Vol. 111. 727 pp.

=== Publications ===
- Szekeres L. [A szívglycosidoktól a gyógyszeres stressadaptációig. Egy ötvenéves kutatómunka tanulságai.] In: Juhász-Nagy S, editor. Studia Physiologica 7. Budapest: Scientia Kiadó; 2000. p. 1–95.
- Szekeres L, Schein M. Cell metabolism of the overloaded mammalian heart in situ. Kardiologia (Basel) 1959; 34: 19–27.
- Szekeres L, Méhes J, Papp J Gy. Mechanism of increased susceptibility to fibrillation of the hypothermic mammalian heart in situ. Br J Pharmacol 1961; 17: 167–175.
- Szekeres L, Papp JG. Experimental Cardiac Arrhythmias and Antiarrhythmic Drugs. (Monograph) Budapest: Akadémiai Kiadó; 1971. p. 1-448.
- Vaughan Williams EM, Szekeres L. A comparison of tests for antifibrillatory action. Br J Pharmacol 1961; 17: 424–432.
- Szekeres L, Vaughan Williams EM. Antifibrillatory action. J Physiol (London) 1962; 160: 470–482.
- Szekeres L, Szurgent J. A new type of electrode for continuous recording of monophasic action potentials from the heart in situ. Cardiovasc Res 1974; 8:132–137.(Note: Important methodological innovation)
- Szekeres L, Csik V, Udvary E. Nitroglycerin and dipyridamole on cardiac metabolism and dynamics in a new experimental model of angina pectoris. J Pharmacol Exp Ther 1976; 196: 15–28.
- Lepran I, Koltai M, Siegmund W, Szekeres L. Coronary artery ligation, early arrhythmias, and determination of the ischemic area in conscious rats. J Pharmacol Methods 1983; 9: 219–230.
- Lepran I, Nemecz G, Koltai M, Szekeres L. Effect of a linoleic acid-rich diet on the acute phase of coronary occlusion in conscious rats: influence of indomethacin and aspirin. J Cardiovasc Pharmacol 1981; 3: 847–853.
- Szekeres L, Udvary E, Vegh A. Nifedipine effects in severe myocardial ischaemia in the dog due to left anterior descending coronary occlusion with left circumflex coronary artery constriction. Br J Pharmacol 1987; 91: 127–37.
- Csete K, Kovacs GL, Szekeres L. Disturbance of motoric function as behavioral measure of impaired cerebral circulation in mice. Physiol Behav 1986; 36: 409–412.
- Szekeres L. Sudden Death due to Acute Myocardial Infarction. (A monograph) Boca Raton, Florida: CRC Press Inc.; 1986. p. 1- 288.
- Szekeres L. On the mechanism and possible therapeutic application of delayed cardiac adaptation to stress. Can J Cardiol 1996;12: 177–185.
- Szekeres L. Delayed adaptation to stress. A clinically useful form of cardiac protection. Exp Clin Cardiol 2000; 5: 116–121.
- Szekeres L., Pharmacological induction of delayed and prolonged cardiac protection: The role of prostanoids. Experimental & Clinical Cardiol. 9: 7–12, 2004.
- Udvary E, Vegh A, Szekeres L. 7-oxo-PGI2 induced late protective action from arrhythmias due to local myocardial ischemia. Bratisl Lek Listy 1991; 92: 146–149.
- Szekeres L, Szilvássy Z, Ferdinandy P, et al. Delayed cardiac protection against harmful consequences of stress can be induced in experimental atherosclerosis in rabbits. J Mol Cell Cardiol 1997; 29: 1977–1983.
- L. Szekeres (1995) Drug induced delayed cardiac protection against the effects of myocardial ischemia Pharmacology and Therapeutics, 108: 269-280

== Other sources ==
- Cardiovascular Pharmacology'87 Ed: J.Gy. Papp, Akadémiai Kiadó Budapest,1987 (650 pp) Festschrift on the occasion of the 20th anniversary of Professor Szekeres' appointment as chairman of the Szeged Department of Pharmacology. Original contributions of 60 leading cardiovascular scientists of the world.
- Scientific works of László Szekeres. Bibliography 1948-1991 Ed: Dr. Papp Gyula Szegedi Nyomda 1991 (66 pp)
- Szegedi Egyetemi Almanach (Szeged University Almanac) Ed: Dr. A. Dobozy SZOTE Nyomda, Szeged 1997 (493pp)
- Új Magyar Lexikon 7 (New Hungarian Encyclopaedia 7) Ed: K. Ákos, Akadémiai Kiadó, Budapest 1972 (471 pp)
- Who is Who in the World. Marquis New Providence (USA) from the 5th edition 1980/81 continuously
- Who is Who in Science and Engineering. Marquis New Providence (USA) from the 4th edition 1998/99 continuously
- CV Network of International Academy of Cardiovascular Sciences Vol:1, No:4 p:7
- 2002 Howard Morgan Award honoree László Szekeres
- A magyar szívkutatók nemzetközi mérlegen. (International evaluation of Hungarian cardiac researchers), S, Juhász Nagy, Semmelweis University of Medical Sciences
- A Gábor György alapítvány Nagydíjának kitüntetettje –1990 Dr Szekeres László (Laureate of the Grand Prize of the George Gábor Foundation: Dr László Szekeres-1990) Cardiologica Hungarica 34: E3 2004.
- Walker.M.J.A. Antiarrhythmic Drug Research. Br, J, Pharmacol :2006, 147: S222-S231
- Achievements of Professor Emeritus László Szekeres. Eds: Dr. Gyula Papp, Dr. András Varró, Dr. Ágnes Végh, Department of Pharmacology and Pharmacotherapy, University of Szeged 2011
