= Pál Regős =

Theatre director and choreographer (1926–2009)

- Born: 7 March 1926; Budapest, Kingdom of Hungary
- Died: 18 July 2009 (aged 83); Budapest, Hungary
- Occupations: pantomimist, director, choreographer

Pál Regős (Hungarian pronunciation: [ˈpaːl ˈrɛɡøːʃ]; 7 March 1926 in Budapest, Kingdom of Hungary – 18 July 2009 in Budapest, Hungary) was a Hungarian pantomimist, choreographer, and director of Szkéné Theatre.

== Biography ==
He studied at the theatre school of Kálmán Rózsahegyi. He played with movement parodies between 1945 and 1948. Later up to 1953 he was an ice dancer. From 1957 till 1966 he played at Magyar Jégrevű as character solo. This time he learnt pantomime. He found Commedia XX Pantomim in 1962, their first show was in 1964. He directed some kind of movements at National Theatre. He made programmes between 1970 and 1973 every summer at the Vörös Sün Ház in the Buda Castle. He founded the pantomime group of Budapest University of Technology and Economics at Szkéné Theatre in 1973. He organised the international meeting of movement theatres. He was the leader of the international project of movement and dance from 1985 to 2005.

== Sources ==
- Hermann Péter: Ki Kicsoda 2002 CD-ROM, Biográf Kiadó ISBN 963-8477-64-4
- Színházi Lexikon
