= Marianne Lepa =

German volleyball player (born 1947)

Personal information
- Nationality: German
- Born: 9 August 1947 (age 77); Hanover, Germany

Sport
- Sport: Volleyball

Marianne Lepa (born 9 August 1947) is a German volleyball player. She competed in the women's tournament at the 1972 Summer Olympics.
