= Albert Szatola =

Hungarian equestrian

Personal information
- Nationality: Hungarian
- Born: 16 February 1927; Budapest, Hungary
- Died: 19 April 2010 (aged 83); Rancho Alegre, Venezuela

Sport
- Sport: Equestrian

Albert Szatola (16 February 1927 – 19 April 2010) was a Hungarian equestrian. He competed in two events at the 1956 Summer Olympics.
