= Wilfried Gröbner =

German footballer and coach

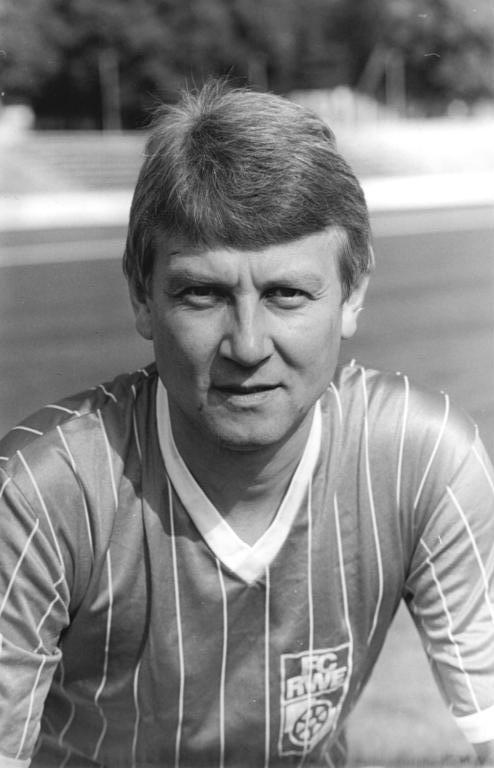
- Gröbner in 1989

Personal information
- Date of birth: 18 December 1949 (age 76)
- Place of birth: Eilenburg, East Germany
- Height: 1.82 m (5 ft 11 1/2 in)
- Position: Defender

Team information
- Current team: 1. FC Nürnberg (Scout)

Youth career
- 1959–1967: BSG Chemie Eilenburg

Senior career*
Years	Team	Apps	(Gls)
1967–1980	Lokomotive Leipzig	239	(21)

International career
1976–1979	East Germany	8	(0)
1976	East Germany Olympic	1	(0)

Managerial career
- 1988–1989: Rot-Weiß Erfurt
- 1990–1994: SSV Reutlingen
Medal record
Representing East Germany
Men's Football
Gold medal – first place	1976 Montreal	Team competition
- * Club domestic league appearances and goals

Wilfried Gröbner (born 18 December 1949) is a German former footballer and coach who was part of East Germany's gold medal-winning team at the 1976 Olympics.

== Club career ==
The defender played 230 East German top-flight matches for Lokomotive Leipzig.

== International career ==
Between 1976 and 1979 he was part of the East Germany national team. His only appearance for the East Germany Olympic team, during this era still counted as a full international when it was played against another A squad (in this case Poland), was in 1976 the Gold Medal match at the Montreal Olympics. East German won this encounter against Poland 3-1 and became Olympic champion.

== Coaching career ==
Gröbner later was at the coaching helm for Rot-Weiß Erfurt and SSV Reutlingen.
