= Mária Mališová =

Slovak volleyball player (born 1945)

Personal information
- Nationality: Slovak
- Born: 6 August 1945 (age 79); Čierny Balog, Czechoslovakia

Sport
- Sport: Volleyball

Mária Mališová (born 6 August 1945) is a Slovak volleyball player. She competed in the women's tournament at the 1972 Summer Olympics.
