= Jana Semecká =

Czech volleyball player (born 1948)

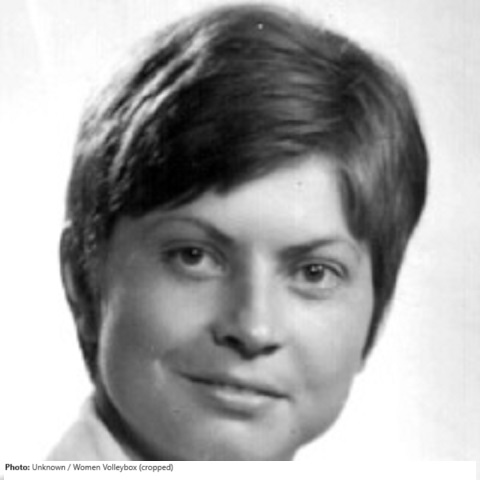
- An image of Jana Semeckà

Personal information
- Nationality: Czech
- Born: 12 January 1948 (age 77)

Sport
- Sport: Volleyball

Jana Semecká (born 12 January 1948) is a Czech volleyball player. She competed in the women's tournament at the 1972 Summer Olympics.
