= Birgit Pörner =

German volleyball player (born 1955)

Personal information
- Nationality: German
- Born: 20 March 1955 (age 70); Hamburg, Germany

Sport
- Sport: Volleyball

Birgit Pörner (born 20 March 1955) is a German volleyball player. She competed in the women's tournament at the 1972 Summer Olympics.
