= Judit Fekete =

Hungarian volleyball player (born 1944)

Personal information
- Nationality: Hungarian
- Born: 2 July 1944 (age 80); Budapest, Hungary

Sport
- Sport: Volleyball

Judit Fekete (born 2 July 1944) is a Hungarian volleyball player. She competed in the women's tournament at the 1972 Summer Olympics.
