= Claritza Herrera =

Cuban volleyball player

Personal information
- Full name: Claritza Herrera Michelena
- Nationality: Cuban
- Born: 9 October 1952 (age 74)
- Height: 1.79 m (5 ft 10 in)

Volleyball information
- Number: 9

National team
1971-1972	Cuba
Honours
Women's volleyball
Representing Cuba
Pan American Games
Gold medal – first place	1971 Cali	Team

Claritza Herrera (born 9 October 1952) is a retired Cuban volleyball player. She competed in the women's tournament at the 1972 Summer Olympics. She also helped the Cuban team win the gold medal at the 1971 Pan American Games.
