= Magyar Kupa (women's volleyball) =

Hungarian Women's Volleyball Cup Magyar női röplabdakupa
- Sport: Volleyball
- Founded: 1951
- Country: Hungary
- Continent: (European Union) Europe
- Most recent champion: Nyíregyháza (6th title)
- Most titles: Kaposvár (18 titles)
- Website: hunvolley.hu

The Magyar Kupa (Hungarian: Magyar női röplabdakupa), is a national cup for professional women's volleyball in Hungary, organized by the Hungarian Volleyball Federation since the 1951 season. Between 1957–58 and 1961–62, the event was not held three consecutive seasons.

Most successful team of the Hungarian Women's Volleyball Cup are Kaposvár Volley with eighteen titles.

== Winners ==
In 1954, 1955 and 1957, the cup was held on a grand scale. In 1983 they played two series (in March and December). In 1967 and 1968 the finals were played only in the following year. Previous cup winners are:

- 1951: Ganz Villamosság
- 1952: Ganz Villamosság
- 1953: MAFC
- 1954: Not Played
- 1955: Budapest SE
- 1956: Budapest SE
- 1957: Budapest SE
- 1957–58: Budapest SE
- 1958–61: Not Played
- 1961–62: Újpest
- 1962–63: Újpest
- 1964: Újpest
- 1965: Újpest
- 1966: Újpest
- 1967: Újpest
- 1968: Újpest
- 1969: NIM
- 1970: NIM
- 1971: NIM
- 1972: NIM
- 1973: NIM
- 1974: Újpest
- 1975: Újpest
- 1976: NIM
- 1977: NIM
- 1978: NIM
- 1979: Tungsram
- 1980: Tungsram
- 1981: Vasas
- 1981–82: Tungsram
- 1982–83: Vasas
- 1983–84: Újpest
- 1984–85: Tungsram
- 1985–86: Újpest
- 1986–87: Újpest
- 1987–88: Tungsram
- 1988–89: Tungsram
- 1989–90: Vasas
- 1990–91: Vasas
- 1991–92: Tungsram
- 1992–93: Tungsram
- 1993–94: Eger
- 1994–95: Eger
- 1995–96: Eger
- 1996–97: Eger
- 1997–98: Eger
- 1998–99: Tatabánya
- 1999–00: Nyíregyháza
- 2000–01: Nyíregyháza
- 2001–02: Nyíregyháza
- 2002–03: Nyíregyháza
- 2003–04: Nyíregyháza
- 2004–05: Vasas
- 2005–06: Vasas
- 2006–07: Nyíregyháza
- 2007–08: Vasas
- 2008–09: Vasas
- 2009–10: Budapest SE
- 2010–11: Budapest SE
- 2011–12: Vasas
- 2012–13: Vasas
- 2013–14: Vasas
- 2014–15: Vasas
- 2015–16: Békéscsaba
- 2016–17: Békéscsaba
- 2017–18: Nyíregyháza
- 2018–19:
