= Ingrid Mierzwiak =

German volleyball player (born 1953)

Personal information
- Born: 23 January 1953 (age 72); Prenzlau, Bezirk Neubrandenburg, East Germany (now Germany)

Sport
- Sport: Volleyball

Ingrid Mierzwiak (born 23 January 1953) is a German volleyball player. She competed in the women's tournament at the 1976 Summer Olympics.
