= Cornelia Rickert =

German volleyball player (born 1954)

Personal information
- Nationality: German
- Born: 30 July 1954 (age 71); Kühlungsborn, East Germany
- Height: 173 cm (5 ft 8 in)

Sport
- Sport: Volleyball
- Position: Outside hitter

Cornelia Rickert (born 30 July 1954) is a German former volleyball player who played the outside hitter position. She competed in the women's tournament at the 1976 Summer Olympics. She also won the European Cup Winners' Cup in 1975 and European Champions Cup in 1978 playing for SC Traktor Schwerin.
