= Jutta Balster =

German volleyball player (born 1952)

Personal information
- Nationality: German
- Born: 4 May 1952 (age 73); Plau am See, East Germany

Sport
- Sport: Volleyball

Jutta Balster (born 4 May 1952) is a German former volleyball player. She competed in the women's tournament at the 1976 Summer Olympics and was placed sixth. Jutta Balster played for SC Traktor Schwerin and was GDR champion several times. She also won the European Cup Winners' Cup in 1975 and European Champions Cup in 1978.
