= Karla Roffeis =

East German volleyball player

Personal information
- Full name: Karla Roffeis (-Mügge)
- Nationality: German
- Born: 4 July 1958 (age 68); Crivitz, Bezirk Schwerin, East Germany
- Height: 180 cm (5 ft 11 in)
Honours
Women's volleyball
Representing East Germany
Olympic Games
Silver medal – second place	1980 Moscow	Team
European Championship
Silver medal – second place	1979 France	Team

Karla Roffeis (later Mügge, born 4 July 1958) is a German former volleyball player who competed for East Germany in the 1976 Summer Olympics and in the 1980 Summer Olympics.

In 1976, Roffeis was part of the East German team that finished sixth in the Olympic tournament. She played all five matches.

Four years later, Roffeis won the silver medal with the East German team in the 1980 Olympic tournament. She played all five matches again.

== Personal life ==
Roffeis is now a teacher at the "Gymnasium am Sonnenberg" in Crivitz, Mecklenburg-Vorpommern, Germany.
