= Barbara Czekalla =

German volleyball player (born 1951)

Personal information
- Full name: Barbara Czekalla
- Nationality: German
- Born: 7 November 1951 (age 74); Caputh, East Germany
- Height: 173 cm (5 ft 8 in)
Honours
Women's volleyball
Representing East Germany
Olympic Games
Silver medal – second place	1980 Moscow	Team

Barbara Czekalla (born 7 November 1951) is a German former volleyball player who competed for East Germany in the 1976 Summer Olympics and in the 1980 Summer Olympics.

She was born in Caputh.

In 1976, she was part of the East German team that finished sixth in the Olympic tournament. She played all five matches.

Four years later, she won the silver medal with the East German team in the 1980 Olympic tournament. She played all five matches again.
