= Helga Offen =

German volleyball player (1951–2020)

Personal information
- Nationality: German
- Born: 3 October 1951; Schwerin, East Germany
- Died: 25 July 2020 (aged 68); Schwerin, Germany

Sport
- Sport: Volleyball

Helga Offen (3 October 1951 – 25 July 2020) was a German volleyball player. She competed for East Germany in the women's tournament at the 1976 Summer Olympics. She also won the European Cup Winners' Cup in 1975 and European Champions Cup in 1978 playing for SC Traktor Schwerin.
