= Zsuzsa Szloboda =

Hungarian volleyball player (born 1954)

Personal information
- Nationality: Hungarian
- Born: 5 December 1954 (age 70); Ózd, Hungary

Sport
- Sport: Volleyball

Zsuzsa Szloboda (born 5 December 1954) is a Hungarian volleyball player. She competed in the women's tournament at the 1976 Summer Olympics.
