= Anke Westendorf =

German volleyball player (born 1954)

Personal information
- Born: 26 February 1954 (age 72); Schwerin, East Germany
Honours
Women's volleyball
Representing East Germany
Olympic Games
Silver medal – second place	1980 Moscow	Team

Anke Westendorf (later Maukel, born 26 February 1954) is a German former volleyball player who competed for East Germany in the 1976 Summer Olympics and in the 1980 Summer Olympics.

Westendorf was born in Schwerin.

In 1976, Westendorf was part of the East German team that finished sixth in the Olympic tournament. She played all five matches.

Four years later, Westendorf won the silver medal with the East German team in the 1980 Olympic tournament. She played all five matches again.

She also won the European Cup Winners' Cup in 1975 and European Champions Cup in 1978 playing for SC Traktor Schwerin.
