= Monika Meißner =

German volleyball player (born 1953)

Personal information
- Nationality: German
- Born: 11 August 1953 (age 71); Meissen, East Germany (now Germany)

Sport
- Sport: Volleyball

Monika Meißner (born 11 August 1953) is a German former volleyball player. She competed in the women's tournament at the 1976 Summer Olympics.
