= Hannelore Meincke =

German volleyball player (born 1948)

Personal information
- Nationality: East Germany
- Born: 17 February 1948 (age 77); Burg Stargard, Soviet occupation zone in Germany

Sport
- Sport: Volleyball

Hannelore Meincke (born 17 February 1948) is a German volleyball player. She competed in the women's tournament at the 1976 Summer Olympics representing East Germany. She also won the European Cup Winners' Cup in 1975 and European Champions Cup in 1978 playing for SC Traktor Schwerin.
