= Johanna Strotzer =

German volleyball player (born 1951)

Personal information
- Nationality: German
- Born: 13 June 1951 (age 73); Böhlen, East Germany

Sport
- Sport: Volleyball

Johanna Strotzer (born 13 June 1951) is a German former volleyball player. She competed in the women's tournament at the 1976 Summer Olympics.
