= Gudrun Gärtner =

German volleyball player (born 1958)

Personal information
- Nationality: German
- Born: 24 December 1958 (age 66); Ludwigslust, East Germany

Sport
- Sport: Volleyball

Gudrun Gärtner (born 24 December 1958) is a German volleyball player. She competed in the women's tournament at the 1976 Summer Olympics.
