= Einar Gundersen (wrestler) =

Norwegian wrestler

Personal information
- Nationality: Norwegian
- Born: 7 September 1948 (age 78) Notodden, Norway

Sport
- Sport: Wrestling

Einar Gundersen (born 7 September 1948) is a Norwegian wrestler. He competed in two events at the 1976 Summer Olympics.
