= Gyöngyi Bardi-Gerevich =

Hungarian volleyball player (born 1958)

Personal information
- Nationality: Hungarian
- Born: 2 February 1958 (age 67); Hosszúpályi, Hungary
- Height: 172 cm (5 ft 8 in)
- Weight: 61 kg (134 lb; 9 st 8 lb)

Sport
- Sport: Volleyball

Gyöngyi Bardi-Gerevich (born 2 February 1958) is a Hungarian volleyball player. She competed at the 1976 Summer Olympics and the 1980 Summer Olympics.
