= Mamadou Sakho (wrestler) =

Senegalese wrestler

Personal information
- Nationality: Senegalese
- Born: 25 January 1951 (age 74) Ziguinchor, Senegal
- Height: 190 cm (6 ft 3 in)
- Weight: 115 kg (254 lb)

Sport
- Sport: Wrestling

Mamadou Sakho (born 25 January 1951) is a Senegalese wrestler. He competed at the 1976 Summer Olympics, the 1980 Summer Olympics and the 1984 Summer Olympics.
