= Emerencia Siry-Király =

Hungarian volleyball player (born 1948)

Personal information
- Nationality: Hungarian
- Born: 2 October 1948 (age 76); Budapest, Hungary

Sport
- Sport: Volleyball

Emerencia Siry-Király (born 2 October 1948) is a Hungarian volleyball player. She competed at the 1972 Summer Olympics, the 1976 Summer Olympics and the 1980 Summer Olympics.
