= Katalin Eichler-Schadek =

Hungarian volleyball player (born 1940)

Personal information
- Nationality: Hungarian
- Born: 14 September 1940 (age 84); Budapest, Hungary

Sport
- Sport: Volleyball

Katalin Eichler-Schadek (born 14 September 1940) is a Hungarian volleyball player. She competed at the 1972 Summer Olympics and the 1976 Summer Olympics.
