= Lucia Bánhegyi-Radó =

Hungarian volleyball player (born 1948)

Personal information
- Nationality: Hungarian
- Born: 22 April 1948 (age 77) Budapest, Hungary

Sport
- Sport: Volleyball

Lucia Bánhegyi-Radó (born 22 April 1948) is a Hungarian volleyball player. She competed at the 1972 Summer Olympics (5th place), the 1976 Summer Olympics (4th place) and the 1980 Summer Olympics (4th place).

She holds 370 selections for Hungary national team and attended to four World championships and five European championships where she won one silver medal in 1975 and two bronze medals in 1977 and in 1981.

She played 20 years for NIM-SE and Vasas Budapest which replaced NIM-SE in 1981. She won Hungarian League 10 times, Magyar Kupa 9 times and European Champions Cup in 1973.

She later has been link to Lille, Courières, Marignane in France and Neuchâtel UC in Switzerland from 1990 as coach.
