= Judit Schlégl-Blaumann =

Hungarian volleyball player (born 1945)

Personal information
- Nationality: Hungarian
- Born: 23 January 1945 (age 80); Budapest, Hungary

Sport
- Sport: Volleyball

Judit Schlégl-Blaumann (born 23 January 1945) is a Hungarian volleyball player. She competed at the 1972 Summer Olympics and the 1976 Summer Olympics.
