= Zsuzsa Biszku =

Hungarian volleyball player (born 1953)

Personal information
- Full name: Zsuzsanna Biszku
- Nationality: Hungarian
- Born: 17 March 1953 (age 72); Budapest, Hungary

Sport
- Sport: Volleyball

Zsuzsanna "Zsuzsa" Biszku (born 17 March 1953) is a Hungarian volleyball player. She competed in the women's tournament at the 1976 Summer Olympics. Her twin sister, Éva, was also on the Hungarian volleyball team at the same Olympics.
