= Éva Sebők-Szalay =

Hungarian volleyball player (1949–2011)

Personal information
- Nationality: Hungarian
- Born: 26 March 1949; Halmaj, Hungary
- Died: 4 July 2011 (aged 62); Budapest, Hungary

Sport
- Sport: Volleyball

Éva Sebők-Szalay (26 March 1949 – 4 July 2011) was a Hungarian volleyball player. She competed at the 1972 Summer Olympics, the 1976 Summer Olympics and the 1980 Summer Olympics.
