= Volleyball at the 1972 Summer Olympics – Men's team rosters =

Olympic volleyball rosters

The following teams and players took part in the men's volleyball tournament at the 1972 Summer Olympics, in Munich.

== Brazil ==
The following volleyball players represented Brazil:

- Aderval Arvani
- Alexandre Abeid
- Antônio Carlos Moreno
- Alexandre Kalache
- Décio Cattaruzzi
- Jorge Delano
- João Jens
- José Marcelino
- Luiz Zech
- Mário Procopio
- Bebeto de Freitas
- Paulo Sevciuc

== Bulgaria ==
The following volleyball players represented Bulgaria:

- Aleksandar Trenev
- Brunko Iliev
- Dimitar Karov
- Dimitar Zlatanov
- Emil Trenev
- Emil Valchev
- Ivan Dimitrov
- Ivan Ivanov
- Kiril Slavov
- Lachezar Stoyanov
- Tsano Tsanov
- Zdravko Simeonov

== Cuba ==
The following volleyball players represented Cuba:

- Alfredo Figueredo
- Antonio Rodríguez
- Carlos Dilaut
- Diego Lapera
- Enrique Fortes
- Ernesto Martínez
- Jorge Pérez Vento
- Lorenzo Martínez
- Luis Calderon
- Luis Jiménez
- Orlando Samuell
- Pedro Delgado

== Czechoslovakia ==
The following volleyball players represented Czechoslovakia:

- Drahomír Koudelka
- Jaroslav Penc
- Jaroslav Stančo
- Jaroslav Tomáš
- Lubomír Zajíček
- Milan Řezníček
- Milan Vápenka
- Miroslav Nekola
- Pavel Schenk
- Štefan Pipa
- Vladimír Petlák
- Zdeněk Groessl

== East Germany ==
The following volleyball players represented East Germany:

- Arnold Schulz
- Wolfgang Webner
- Siegfried Schneider
- Wolfgang Weise
- Rudi Schumann
- Eckehard Pietzsch
- Wolfgang Löwe
- Wolfgang Maibohm
- Rainer Tscharke
- Jürgen Maune
- Horst Peter
- Horst Hagen

== Japan ==
The following volleyball players represented Japan:

- Masayuki Minami
- Katsutoshi Nekoda
- Kenji Kimura
- Jungo Morita
- Tadayoshi Yokota
- Seiji Oko
- Tetsuo Sato
- Kenji Shimaoka
- Yoshihide Fukao
- Yuzo Nakamura
- Yasuhiro Noguchi
- Tetsuo Nishimoto

== Poland ==
The following volleyball players represented Poland:

- Alojzy Świderek
- Bronisław Bebel
- Edward Skorek
- Jan Such
- Marek Karbarz
- Ryszard Bosek
- Stanisław Gościniak
- Stanisław Iwaniak
- Wiesław Gawłowski
- Włodzimierz Stefański
- Zbigniew Zarzycki
- Zdzisław Ambroziak

== Romania ==
The following volleyball players represented Romania:

- Cornel Oros
- Cristian Ion
- Gabriel Udişteanu
- Gyula Bartha
- Laurenţiu Dumănoiu
- Marian Stamate
- Mircea Tutovan-Codoi
- Romeo Enescu
- Stelian Moculescu
- Viorel Bălaş
- William Schreiber

== South Korea ==
The following volleyball players represented South Korea:

- Choi Jong-ok
- Jeong Dong-gi
- Jin Jun-tak
- Gang Man-su
- Kim Chung-han
- Kim Geon-bong
- Kim Gwi-hwan
- Lee Seon-gu
- Lee Yong-gwan
- Park Gi-won

== Soviet Union ==
The following volleyball players represented the Soviet Union:

- Valery Kravchenko
- Yuriy Poiarkov
- Yevhen Lapynskiy
- Yefim Chulak
- Vladimir Putyatov
- Vladimir Patkin
- Leonid Zayko
- Yury Starunsky
- Vladimir Kondra
- Vyacheslav Domani
- Viktor Borshch
- Aleksandr Saprykin

== Tunisia ==
The following volleyball players represented Tunisia:

- Abdel Aziz Bousarsar
- Abdel Aziz Derbal
- Hamouda Ben Massaoud
- Mohamed Ben Sheikh
- Moncef Ben Soltane
- Naceur Ben Othman
- Naceur Bounatouf
- Oueil Behi Mohamed
- Rafik Ben Amor
- Raja Hayder
- Samir Lamouchi

== West Germany ==
The following volleyball players represented West Germany:

- Bernard Endrich
- Hans-Georg von der Ohe
- Hans-Ulrich Graßhoff
- Hatto Nolte
- Klaus Meetz
- Klaus-Dieter Buschle
- Rüdiger Hild
- Toni Rimrod
- Ulf Tütken
- Uwe Zitranski
- Volker Paulus
- Wolfgang Simon
