= East Germany at the 1972 Summer Olympics =

- IOC code: GDR
- NOC: National Olympic Committee of the German Democratic Republic

in Munich, West Germany 26 August–10 September 1972
- Competitors: 297 (231 men and 66 women) in 18 sports
- Flag bearer: Manfred Wolke
- Medals Ranked 3rd: Gold 20 Silver 23 Bronze 23 Total 66

Summer Olympics appearances (overview)
- 1968; 1972; 1976; 1980; 1984; 1988

Other related appearances
- Germany (1896–1936, 1992–); United Team of Germany (1956–1964)

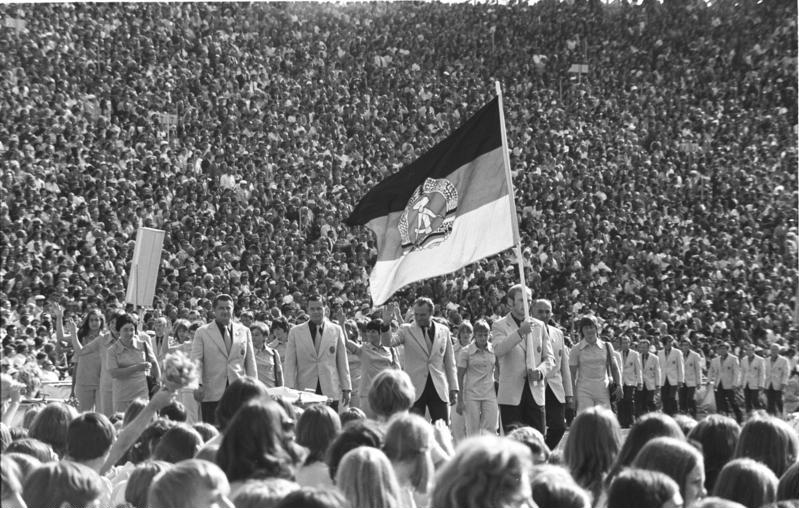
East German team at the opening ceremony

Athletes from East Germany (German Democratic Republic, called DDR in the opening ceremony) competed at the 1972 Summer Olympics in Munich, West Germany. 297 competitors, 231 men and 66 women, took part in 161 events in 18 sports.

== Medalists ==
=== Gold ===
- Peter Frenkel — Athletics, Men's 20 km Walk
- Wolfgang Nordwig — Athletics, Men's Pole Vault
- Renate Stecher — Athletics, Women's 100 metres
- Renate Stecher — Athletics, Women's 200 metres
- Monika Zehrt — Athletics, Women's 400 metres
- Annelie Ehrhardt — Athletics, Women's 100 m Hurdles
- Monika Zehrt, Dagmar Käsling, Rita Kühne, and Helga Seidler — Athletics, Women's 4 × 400 m Relay
- Ruth Fuchs — Athletics, Women's Javelin Throw
- Siegbert Horn — Canoeing, Men's K1 Kayak Slalom Singles
- Reinhard Eiben — Canoeing, Men's C1 Canadian Slalom Singles
- Rolf-Dieter Amend and Walter Hofmann — Canoeing, Men's C2 Canadian Slalom Pairs
- Angelika Bahmann — Canoeing, Women's K1 Kayak Slalom Singles
- Klaus Köste — Gymnastics, Men's Long Horse Vault
- Karin Janz — Gymnastics, Women's Side Horse Vault
- Karin Janz — Gymnastics, Women's Asymmetrical Bars
- Siegfried Brietzke and Wolfgang Mager — Rowing, Men's Coxless Pairs
- Wolfgang Gunkel, Jörg Lucke, and Klaus-Dieter Neubert — Rowing, Men's Coxed Pairs
- Dieter Schubert, Frank Forberger, Dieter Grahn and Frank Rühle — Rowing, Men's Coxless Fours
- Roland Matthes — Swimming, Men's 100 m Backstroke
- Roland Matthes — Swimming, Men's 200 m Backstroke

=== Silver ===
- Stefan Junge — Athletics, Men's High Jump
- Jörg Drehmel — Athletics, Men's triple jump
- Jochen Sachse — Athletics, Men's Hammer Throw
- Gunhild Hoffmeister — Athletics, Women's 1500 metres
- Bärbel Struppert, Christina Heinich, Evelin Kaufer, and Renate Stecher — Athletics, Women's 4 × 100 m Relay
- Margitta Gummel-Helmboldt — Athletics, Women's Shot Put
- Jacqueline Todten — Athletics, Women's Javelin Throw
- Petra Grabowski and Ilse Kaschube — Canoeing, Women's K2 500 m Kayak Pairs
- Uwe Unterwalder, Thomas Huschke, Heinz Richter, and Herbert Richter — Cycling, Men's 4000 m Team Pursuit
- Jürgen Geschke and Werner Otto — Cycling, Men's 2000 m Tandem
- Karin Janz — Gymnastics, Women's All-Around Individual
- Erika Zuchold — Gymnastics, Women's Side Horse Vault
- Erika Zuchold — Gymnastics, Women's Asymmetrical Bars
- Erika Zuchold, Richarda Schmeißer, Christine Schmitt, Irene Abel, Angelika Hellmann, and Karin Janz — Gymnastics, Women's Team Combined Exercises
- Eckhard Martens, Dietrich Zander, Reinhard Gust, Rolf Jobst, and Klaus-Dieter Ludwig — Rowing, Men's Coxed Fours
- Roland Matthes, Klaus Katzur, Hartmut Flöckner, and Lutz Unger — Swimming, Men's 4 × 100 m Medley Relay
- Roswitha Beier — Swimming, Women's 100 m Butterfly
- Kornelia Ender — Swimming, Women's 200 m Individual Medley
- Gabriele Wetzko, Andrea Eife, Kornelia Ender, and Elke Sehmisch — Swimming, Women's 4 × 100 m Freestyle Relay
- Christine Herbst, Renate Vogel, Roswitha Beier, and Kornelia Ender — Swimming, Women's 4 × 100 m Medley Relay
- Rainer Tscharke, Wolfgang Webner, Wolfgang Weise, Siegfried Schneider, Arnold Schulz, Rudi Schumann, Jürgen Maune, Horst Peter, Eckehard Pietzsch, Horst Hagen, Wolfgang Löwe, and Wolfgang Maibohm — Volleyball, Men's Team Competition
- Heinz-Helmut Wehling — Wrestling, Men's Greco-Roman Featherweight
- Paul Borowski, Karl-Heinz Thun and Konrad Weichert — Sailing, Men's Dragon Class

=== Bronze ===
- Hans-Georg Reimann — Athletics, Men's 20 km Walk
- Hartmut Briesenick — Athletics, Men's Shot Put
- Gunhild Hoffmeister — Athletics, Women's 800 metres
- Karin Balzer — Athletics, Women's 100 m Hurdles
- Burglinde Pollak — Athletics, Women's Pentathlon
- Peter Tiepold — Boxing, Men's Light Middleweight
- Marina Janicke — Diving, Women's 3 m Springboard
- Marina Janicke — Diving, Women's 10 m Platform
- Harald Gimpel — Canoeing, Men's K1 Kayak Slalom Singles
- Jürgen Schütze — Cycling, Men's 1000 m Time Trial
- Jürgen Paeke, Reinhard Rychly, Wolfgang Thüne, Matthias Brehme, Wolfgang Klotz, and Klaus Köste — Gymnastics, Men's Team Combined Exercises 559.70
- Karin Janz — Gymnastics, Women's Balance Beam
- Dietmar Hötger — Judo, Men's Half Middleweight (70 kg)
- Wolfgang Güldenpfennig — Rowing, Men's Single Sculls
- Joachim Böhmer and Hans-Ullrich Schmied — Rowing, Men's Double Sculls
- Manfred Schneider, Hartmut Schreiber, Dietmar Schwarz, Jörg Landvoigt, Heinrich Mederow, Manfred Schmorde, Hans-Joachim Borzym, Harold Dimke, and Bernd Landvoigt — Rowing, Men's Rowing Eights
- Werner Lippoldt — Shooting, Men's Small-bore Rifle, Three Positions
- Michael Buchheim — Shooting, Men's Skeet Shooting
- Konrad Weise, Manfred Zapf, Joachim Streich, Eberhard Vogel, Siegmar Wätzlich, Ralf Schulenberg, Wolfgang Seguin, Jürgen Sparwasser, Hans-Jürgen Kreische, Lothar Kurbjuweit, Jürgen Pommerenke, Frank Ganzera, Reinhard Häfner, Harald Irmscher, Bernd Bransch, Jürgen Croy, and Peter Ducke — Football (soccer), Men's Team Competition
- Lutz Unger, Peter Bruch, Wilfried Hartung, and Roland Matthes — Swimming, Men's 4 × 100 m Freestyle Relay
- Gudrun Wegner — Swimming, Women's 400 m Freestyle
- Stefan Grützner — Weightlifting, Men's Heavyweight
- Gerd Bonk — Weightlifting, Men's Super Heavyweight

== Athletics ==
Men's 800 metres

- Dieter Fromm
  - Heat — 1:46.9
  - Semifinals — 1:48.1
  - Final — 1:48.0 (→ 8th place)

Men's 1500 metres

- Klaus-Peter Justus
  - Heat — 3:40.4
  - Semifinals — 3:44.6 (→ did not advance)

Men's 4 × 100 m Relay

- Manfred Kokot, Bernd Borth, Hans-Jörgen Bombach, and Siegfried Schenke
  - Heat — 39.17s
  - Semifinals — 39.06s
  - Final — 38.90s (→ 5th place)

Men's High Jump

- Stefan Junge
  - Qualifying Round — 2.15m
  - Final — 2.21m (→ Silver Medal)

== Boxing ==
Men's Light Middleweight (– 71 kg)

- Peter Tiepold → Bronze Medal
  - First Round — Bye
  - Second Round — Defeated Ion Györfi (ROM), 4:1
  - Third Round — Defeated Mikko Saarinen (FIN), 5:0
  - Quarterfinals — Defeated Emeterio Villanueva (MEX), 5:0
  - Semifinals — Lost to Wiesław Rudkowski (POL), 1:4

Men's Heavyweight (+ 81 kg)

- Jürgen Fanghänel
  - First Round — Defeated Atanas Suvandzhiev (BUL), KO-1
  - Quarterfinals — Lost to Ion Alexe (ROM), 0:5

== Canoeing ==
=== Slalom ===
Athlete	Event	Preliminary				Final	
Athlete	Event	Run 1	Rank	Run 2	Rank	Best	Rank
Reinhard Eiben	Men's C-1	327.50	1	315.84	1	315.84	Gold medal
Jochen Förster	Men's C-1	354.42	3	365.45	5	354.42	4
Jürgen Köhler	Men's C-1	372.88	4	447.70	13	372.88	6
Walter Hofmann; Rolf-Dieter Amend	Men's C-2	310.68	1	445.51	15	310.68	Gold medal
Jürgen Kretschmer; Klaus Trummer	Men's C-2	329.57	3	DNF		329.57	4
Jürgen Henze; Herbert Fischer	Men's C-2	DNF		508.44	18	508.44	18
Jürgen Bremer	Men's K-1	408.50	24	303.15	7	303.15	8
Harald Gimpel	Men's K-1	298.11	5	277.95	2	277.95	Bronze medal
Siegbert Horn	Men's K-1	363.20	17	268.56	1	268.56	Gold medal
Angelika Bahmann	Women's K-1	413.07	2	364.50	1	364.50	Gold medal
Sybille Bödecker	Women's K-1	482.88	8	526.10	10	482.88	11
Martina Falke	Women's K-1	482.20	7	DNF		482.20	10

=== Sprint ===
Men

Athlete	Event	Heats		Repechages		Semifinals		Final	
Athlete	Event	Time	Rank	Time	Rank	Time	Rank	Time	Rank
Dirk Weise	C-1 1000 m	4:41.04	3 Q	—N/a		BYE		4:14.38	4
Dirk Weise; Dieter Lichtenberg	C-2 1000 m	4:12.95	3 Q	BYE		3:52.66	1 Q	4:01.50	7
Joachim Mattern	K-1 1000 m	4:02.88	2 Q	BYE		3:54.24	3 Q	3:51.94	6
Reiner Kurth; Alexander Slatnow	K-2 1000 m	3:46.05	1 Q	BYE		3:32.82	1 Q	3:34.16	4
Volkmar Thiede; Eduard Augustin; Herbert Laabs; Joachim Mattern	K-4 1000 m	3:18.65	2 Q	BYE		3:11.65	4	Did not advance	

Women

Athlete	Event	Heats		Repechages		Semifinals		Final	
Athlete	Event	Time	Rank	Time	Rank	Time	Rank	Time	Rank
Bettina Müller	K-1 500 m	2:15.15	4 q	2:08.92	1 Q	2:07.90	3 Q	2:06.85	5
Ilse Kaschube; Petra Grabowski	K-2 500 m	2:00.96	2 Q	—N/a		BYE		1:54.30	Silver medal

== Cycling ==
Eleven cyclists represented East Germany in 1972.

=== Road ===
Athlete	Event	Time	Rank
Dieter Gonschorek	Men's road race	DNF	
Wolfram Kühn	Men's road race	DNF	
Karl-Heinz Oberfranz	Men's road race	4:17:36	30
Wolfgang Wesemann	Men's road race	4:17:36	33

=== Track ===
1000 m time trial

Athlete	Event	Time	Rank
Jürgen Schütze	Men's 1000 m time trial	1:07.02	Bronze medal

Men's Sprint

Athlete	Event	Heats	Repechage 1	Round 2	Repechage 2	Round 3	Repechage 3	Repechage Finals	Quarterfinals	Semifinals	Final
Athlete	Event	Time Speed (km/h)	Rank	Opposition Time Speed (km/h)	Opposition Time Speed (km/h)	Opposition Time Speed (km/h)	Opposition Time Speed (km/h)	Opposition Time Speed (km/h)	Opposition Time Speed (km/h)	Opposition Time Speed (km/h)	Rank
Hans-Jürgen Geschke	Men's sprint	Díaz (COL); Rahbar (IRN); W 11.52	BYE	Crutchlow (GBR); Kocot (POL); W 11.53	BYE	King (TTO); Cardi (ITA); W 11.42	BYE		Balk (NED); L 1:2 11.63	Did not advance	5
Werner Otto	Men's sprint	Reybaud (ARG); Crutchlow (GBR); L	King (TTO); Chiarasapawong (THA); L	Did not advance							

Pursuit

Athlete	Event	Qualification		Quarterfinals	Semifinals	Final	
Athlete	Event	Time	Rank	Opposition Time	Opposition Time	Opposition Time	Rank
Thomas Huschke	Men's individual pursuit	4:57.95	9	Did not advance			9
Thomas Huschke; Heinz Richter; Herbert Richter; Uwe Unterwalder	Team pursuit	4:25.48	2 Q	Switzerland (SUI); W 4:23.26	Poland (POL); W 4:23.14	West Germany (FRG); L 4:25.25	Silver medal

Men's Tandem

Athlete	Event	Heats	Repechage	Repechage Finals	Quarterfinals	Semifinals	Final	
Athlete	Event	Opposition Time Speed (km/h)	Opposition Time Speed (km/h)	Opposition Time Speed (km/h)	Opposition Time Speed (km/h)	Opposition Time Speed (km/h)	Opposition Time Speed (km/h)	Rank
Jürgen Geschke; Werner Otto	Tandem	Cooke; Rowe (ITA); W 11.66	BYE		Snellinx; Soetaert (BEL); W 2:0 (10.75; 10.80)	Andrzej Bek; Benedykt Kocot (POL); W 2:0 (10:45; 10:91)	Semenets; Tselovalnikov (URS); L 1:2 (10.68)	Silver medal

== Diving ==
Men

Athlete	Event	Preliminaries		Final			
Athlete	Event	Points	Rank	Points	Rank	Total	Rank
Falk Hoffmann	3 m springboard	384.45	5 Q	160.50	11	544.95	7
Falk Hoffmann	10 m platform	291.54	8 Q	145.17	10	436.71	10
Lothar Matthes	10 m platform	298.41	6 Q	167.34	3	465.75	4
Wolfram Ristau	10 m platform	268.59	23	Did not advance			
Helge Ziethen	3 m springboard	364.02	8 Q	147.00	12	511.02	12

Women

Athlete	Event	Preliminaries		Final			
Athlete	Event	Points	Rank	Points	Rank	Total	Rank
Heidi Becker	3 m springboard	281.58	4 Q	124.20	10	405.78	9
Sylvia Fiedler	10 m platform	206.07	4 Q	135.60	8	341.67	6
Marina Janicke	3 m springboard	273.48	8 Q	157.44	2	430.92	Bronze medal
Marina Janicke	10 m platform	206.73	3 Q	153.81	2	360.54	Bronze medal
Christa Köhler	3 m springboard	278.88	5 Q	115.32	12	394.20	11

== Equestrian ==
=== Dressage ===
Athlete	Horse	Event	Qualification		Final		Overall	
Athlete	Horse	Event	Score	Rank	Score	Rank	Score	Rank
Gerhard Brockmüller	Marios	Individual	1545	13	Did not advance			
Horst Köhler	Imanuel	Individual	1486	17	Did not advance			
Wolfgang Müller	Semafor	Individual	1521	16	Did not advance			
Gerhard Brockmüller; Horst Köhler; Wolfgang Müller	See above	Team	4552	5	—N/a		4552	5

=== Eventing ===
Athlete	Horse	Event	Dressage		Cross-country			Jumping			Total	
Athlete	Horse	Event	Dressage		Cross-country			Final			Total	
Athlete	Horse	Event	Penalties	Rank	Penalties	Total	Rank	Penalties	Total	Rank	Penalties	Rank
Rudolf Beerbohm	Ingolf	Individual	71.00	64	74.80	3.80	15	0.00	3.80	1	3.80	11
Joachim Brohmann	Uranio	Individual	51.33	19	71,73	71.73	47	0.00	71.73	1	71.73	25
Helmut Gille	Pflicht	Individual	69.00	58	34.80	34.20	32	40.00	74.20	40	74.20	26
Jens Niehls	Big-Ben	Individual	84.00	70	34.00	50.00	39	10.00	60.00	16	60.00	23
Rudolf Beerbohm; Joachim Brohmann; Helmut Gille; Jens Niehls	See above	Team	191.33	15	143.60	80.40	5	10.00	127.93	2	127.93	5

== Fencing ==
Five fencers, all men, represented East Germany in 1972.

Men's épée

- Horst Melzig
- Bernd Uhlig
- Hans-Peter Schulze

Men's team épée

- Harry Fiedler, Eckhard Mannischeff, Horst Melzig, Hans-Peter Schulze, Bernd Uhlig

== Football ==
=== First round ===
==== Group D ====
Team	Pld	W	D	L	GF	GA	GD	Pts	Qualification
Poland	3	3	0	0	11	2	+9	6	Advanced to second round
East Germany	3	2	0	1	11	3	+8	4	Advanced to second round
Colombia	3	1	0	2	5	12	−7	2	
Ghana	3	0	0	3	1	11	−10	0	

Source: FIFA
28 August 1972
17:30

East Germany	4–0	Ghana
Kreische 19', 89'; Streich 45'; Sparwasser 66'	Report

Olympic Stadium, Munich
Attendance: 40,000
Referee: Michael Wuertz (United States)

30 August 1972
16:30

East Germany	6–1	Colombia
Streich 1', 10'; Sparwasser 9'; Ducke 31'; Vogel 85'; Kreische 88' (pen.)	Report	Espinosa 38'

Dreiflüssestadion, Passau
Attendance: 4,500
Referee: Abdelkader Aouissi (Algelia)

1 September 1972
16:30

Poland	2–1	East Germany
Gorgoń 6', 63'	Report	Streich 45'

Frankenstadion, Nuremberg
Attendance: 10.000
Referee: Werner Winsemann (Canada)

=== Second round ===
==== Group 1 ====
Team	Pld	W	D	L	GF	GA	GD	Pts	Qualification
Hungary	3	3	0	0	8	1	+7	6	Gold Medal match
East Germany	3	2	0	1	10	4	+6	4	Bronze Medal match
West Germany	3	0	1	2	4	8	−4	1	
Mexico	3	0	1	2	1	10	−9	1	

Source: FIFA
3 September 1972
15:00

Hungary	2–0	East Germany
A. Dunai 60'; Tóth 66'	Report

Dreiflüssestadion, Passau
Attendance: 8,500
Referee: Armando Marques (Brazil)

5 September 1972
15:00

East Germany	7–0	Mexico
Ganzera 34'; Sparwasser 39', 51', 89'; Streich 48'; Kreische 72'; Häfner 79'	Report

ESV-Stadion, Ingolstadt
Attendance: 5,500
Referee: Jafar Namdar (Iran)

8 September 1972
21:30

East Germany	3–2	West Germany
Pommerenke 10'; Streich 53'; Vogel 82'	Report	Hoeneß 31'; Hitzfeld 68'

Olympic Stadium, Munich
Attendance: 80,000
Referee: William Mullan (Great Britain)

=== Bronze Medal match ===
10 September 1972
10:00

Soviet Union	2–2	East Germany
Blokhin 10'; Khurtsilava 30'	Report	Kreische 33' (pen.); Vogel 78'

Olympic Stadium, Munich
Attendance: 80,000
Referee: Armando Marques (Brazil)

Bronze medals shared.

== Handball ==
Men's Team Competition

As expected, the East Germans dominated the first round, defeating Iceland, Tunisia, and Czechoslovakia in turn to win their division. The second round began with a loss to the Soviet Union. Czechoslovakia's wins over the Soviet Union and Sweden meant that the East Germans had to defeat Sweden as well just to tie the Czechoslovak team in the standings, which they did. However, the tie-breaker went against the East Germans and they placed second in the division. They played the other division's second place team, Romania in the bronze medal game and lost, receiving fourth place.

- Preliminary Round (Group B)
  - East Germany – Iceland 16-11 (7-6)
  - East Germany – Tunisia 21-9 (11-2)
  - East Germany – Czechoslovakia 14-12 (5-4)
- Second Round (Group A)
  - East Germany – Soviet Union 8-11 (4-4)
  - East Germany – Sweden 14-11 (8-6)
- Bronze Medal Game
  - East Germany – Romania 16-19 (8-11) → 4th place
- Team Roster
  - Harry Zörnack
  - Horst Jankhöfer
  - Josef Rose
  - Jürgen Hildebrand
  - Klaus Langhoff
  - Klaus Weiß
  - Peter Larisch
  - Peter Randt
  - Rainer Würdig
  - Rainer Zimmermann
  - Reiner Frieske
  - Reiner Ganschow
  - Siegfried Voigt
  - Udo Röhrig
  - Wolfgang Böhme
  - Wolfgang Lakenmacher

== Rowing ==
Men's single sculls

- Wolfgang Güldenpfennig
  - Heat — 7:46.31
  - Repechage — 8:05.19
  - Semi Finals — 8:16.35
  - Final — 7:14.45 (→ Bronze medal)

Men's double sculls

- Joachim Böhmer
- Uli Schmied

Men's coxless pair

- Siegfried Brietzke
- Wolfgang Mager

Men's coxed pair

- Wolfgang Gunkel, Jörg Lucke and Klaus-Dieter Neubert
  - Heat — 7:54.11
  - Semi Finals — 8:13.87
  - Final — 7:17.25 (→ Gold medal)

Men's coxless four

- Frank Forberger
- Dieter Grahn
- Frank Rühle
- Dieter Schubert

Men's coxed four

- Dietrich Zander
- Reinhard Gust
- Eckhard Martens
- Rolf Jobst
- Klaus-Dieter Ludwig

Men's eight

- Hans-Joachim Borzym
- Jörg Landvoigt
- Harold Dimke
- Manfred Schneider
- Hartmut Schreiber
- Manfred Schmorde
- Bernd Landvoigt
- Heinrich Mederow
- Dietmar Schwarz

== Shooting ==
Nine male shooters represented East Germany in 1972. Werner Lippoldt won bronze in the 50 m rifle, three positions and Michael Buchheim won bronze in the skeet.

25 m pistol

- Christian Düring

50 m pistol

- Harald Vollmar

300 m rifle, three positions

- Uto Wunderlich
- Werner Lippoldt

50 m rifle, three positions

- Werner Lippoldt
- Uto Wunderlich

50 m rifle, prone

- Werner Lippoldt
- Peter Gorewski

Trap

- Burckhardt Hoppe
- Manfred Geisler

Skeet

- Michael Buchheim
- Klaus Reschke

== Swimming ==
Men's 100 m Freestyle

- Peter Bruch
  - Heat — 54.25s
  - Semifinals — 53.97s (→ did not advance)
- Wilfried Härtung
  - Heat — 54.37s (→ did not advance)
- Hartmut Flöckner
  - Heat — 54.36s (→ did not advance)

Men's 200 m Freestyle

- Wilfried Härtung
  - Heat — 1:56.95 (→ did not advance)
- Udo Poser
  - Heat — 1:57.23 (→ did not advance)
- Peter Bruch
  - Heat — 1:58.49 (→ did not advance)

Men's 4 × 100 m Freestyle Relay

- Wilfried Härtung, Peter Bruch, Udo Poser and Lutz Unger
  - Heat — 3:35.13
- Roland Matthes, Wilfried Härtung, Peter Bruch, and Lutz Unger
  - Final — 3:32.42 (→ Bronze Medal)

Men's 4 × 200 m Freestyle Relay

- Wilfried Härtung, Udo Poser, Roger Pyttel and Lutz Unger
  - Heat — 7:51.11
- Wilfried Härtung, Peter Bruch, Udo Poser, and Lutz Unger
  - Final — 7:49.11 (→ 6th place)

== Volleyball ==
Men's Team Competition

- Preliminary Round (Group B)
  - Defeated Cuba (3-0)
  - Defeated Brazil (3-1)
  - Lost to Japan (0-3)
  - Defeated West Germany (3-0)
  - Defeated Romania (3-0)
- Semifinals
  - Defeated Soviet Union (3-1)
- Final
  - Lost to Japan (1-3) → Silver Medal
- Team Roster
  - Siggi Schneider
  - Arnold Schulz
  - Wolfgang Webner
  - Eckhardt Pietzsch
  - Rudi Schumann
  - Wolfgang Weise
  - Horst Hagen
  - Horst Peter
  - Wolfgang Löwe
  - Rainer Tscharke
  - Wolf Maibohn
  - Jürgen Maune
