= Czechoslovakia at the 1972 Summer Olympics =

- IOC code: TCH
- NOC: Czechoslovak Olympic Committee

in Munich
- Competitors: 181 (145 men and 36 women) in 17 sports
- Flag bearer: Ludvík Daněk (athletics)
- Medals Ranked 18th: Gold 2 Silver 4 Bronze 2 Total 8

Summer Olympics appearances (overview)
- 1920; 1924; 1928; 1932; 1936; 1948; 1952; 1956; 1960; 1964; 1968; 1972; 1976; 1980; 1984; 1988; 1992

Other related appearances
- Bohemia (1900–1912); Czech Republic (1994–pres.); Slovakia (1994–pres.)

Czechoslovakia competed at the 1972 Summer Olympics in Munich, West Germany. 181 competitors, 145 men and 36 women, took part in 93 events in 17 sports.

== Medalists ==
Medal	Name	Sport	Event
Gold	Ludvík Daněk	Athletics	Men's discus throw
Gold	Vítězslav Mácha	Wrestling	Men's Greco-Roman 74 kg
Silver	Milena Duchková	Diving	Women's 10 m platform
Silver	Czechoslovakia national handball team: Ladislav Beneš; František Brůna; Vladimír Haber; Vladimír Jarý; Jiří Kavan; Arnošt Klimčík; Jaroslav Konečný; František Králík; Jindřich Krepindl; Vincent Lafko; Andrej Lukošík; Pavel Mikeš; Petr Pospíšil; Ivan Satrapa; Zdeněk Škára; Jaroslav Škarvan	Handball	Men's competition
Silver	Vladimír Petříček; Pavel Svojanovský; Oldřich Svojanovský	Rowing	Men's coxed pair
Silver	Ladislav Falta	Shooting	Mixed 25 m rapid fire pistol
Bronze	Eva Šuranová	Athletics	Women's long jump
Bronze	Vladimír Jánoš; Otakar Mareček; Karel Neffe; Vladimír Petříček; František Provazník	Rowing	Men's coxed four

== Athletics ==
Men's 100 metres

- Juraj Demec
  - First Heat — 10.66s (→ did not advance)

Men's 800 metres

- Jozef Plachý
  - Heat — 1:47.1
  - Semifinals — 1:48.9 (→ did not advance)

Men's 1500 metres

- Jozef Horčic
  - Heat — 3:45.7 (→ did not advance)

Men's 5000 metres

- Josef Janský
  - Heat — 13:39.8 (→ did not advance)
- Dusan Moravcik
  - Heat — 13:40.4 (→ did not advance)

Men's 4 × 100 m Relay

- Jaroslav Matousek, Juraj Demec, Jiri Kynos, and Luděk Bohman
  - Heat — 39.31s
  - Semifinals — 39.01s
  - Final — 38.82s (→ 4th place)

Men's High Jump

- Roman Moravec
  - Qualification Round — 2.12m (→ did not advance)
- Jaroslav Alexa
  - Qualification Round — 2.09m (→ did not advance)

== Cycling ==
Fifteen cyclists represented Czechoslovakia in 1972.

Individual road race

- Jiří Prchal — 18th place
- Jiří Háva — 41st place
- Petr Matoušek — 47th place
- Alois Holík — did not finish (→ no ranking)

Team time trial

- Miloš Hrazdíra
- Jiří Mainuš
- Petr Matoušek
- Vlastimil Moravec

Sprint

- Vladimír Vačkář
- Ivan Kučírek

1000m time trial

- Anton Tkáč
  - Final — 1:08.78 (→ 13th place)

Tandem

- Ivan Kučírek and Vladimír Popelka → 8th place

Individual pursuit

- Milan Puzrla

Team pursuit

- Zdeněk Dohnal
- Jiří Mikšík
- Anton Tkáč
- Milan Zyka

== Fencing ==
Two fencers, one man and one woman, represented Czechoslovakia in 1972.

Men's foil

- František Koukal

Women's foil

- Katarína Lokšová-Ráczová

== Handball ==
Czechoslovakia won a silver medal at the second Olympic handball tournament. In the first round, the team tied for second place in the points ranking after defeating Tunisia, tying Iceland, and losing to East Germany. Czechoslovakia won the tie-breaker over the Iceland team, which had also defeated Tunisia and lost to East Germany, and advanced to the second round. There, wins over Sweden and the Soviet Union put Czechoslovakia in another standings tie, this time in first place with East Germany. Again, the tie-breaker went to Czechoslovakia, giving the team the opportunity to play Yugoslavia, the winner of the other group, in the gold medal game. Yugoslavia won, 21–16, leaving Czechoslovakia with the silver.

Men's Team Competition:

- Czechoslovakia - silver medal (3–2–1)

== Rowing ==
Men's Single Sculls

- Jaroslav Hellebrand
  - Heat — 7:58.15
  - Repechage — 8:19.28
  - Semi Finals — 8:44.60
  - B-Final — 8:11.04 (→ 12th place)

Men's Coxed Pairs

- Oldřich Svojanovský, Pavel Svojanovský and Vladimír Petříček
  - Heat — 7:41.27
  - Semi Finals — 8:07.88
  - Final — 7:19.57 (→ Silver Medal)

== Shooting ==
Eight male shooters represented Czechoslovakia in 1972.

25 m pistol

- Ladislav Falta
- Vladimír Hurt

50 m pistol

- Hynek Hromada
- Miroslav Štefan

300 m rifle, three positions

- Karel Bulan
- Rudolf Pojer

50 m rifle, three positions

- Petr Kovářík
- Karel Bulan

50 m rifle, prone

- Jiří Vogler
- Rudolf Pojer

== Volleyball ==
Men's team competition

- Team Roster
  - Vladimír Petlák
  - Milan Vápenka
  - Pavel Schenk
  - Zdeněk Groessl
  - Stefan Pipa
  - Jaroslav Tomáš
  - Drahomír Koudelka
  - Jaroslav Stančo
  - Lubomír Zajíček
  - Jaroslav Penc
  - Milan Řezníček
  - Miroslav Nekola
- Head coaches: Karel Láznička and Zdeněk Malý
