= Jorge Delano =

Brazilian volleyball player (born 1947)

Personal information
- Born: 18 March 1947 (age 78); Rio de Janeiro, Brazil

Sport
- Sport: Volleyball

Jorge Delano (born 18 March 1947) is a Brazilian volleyball player. He competed in the men's tournament at the 1972 Summer Olympics.
