= Luiz Zech =

Brazilian volleyball player (born 1949)

Personal information
- Born: 20 September 1949 (age 76) Belo Horizonte, Brazil

Sport
- Sport: Volleyball

Luiz Zech (Luiz Eymard Zech Coelho; born 20 September 1949) is a Brazilian volleyball player. He competed in the men's tournament at the 1972 Summer Olympics.
