= Hans-Georg von der Ohe =

German volleyball player (born 1950)

Personal information
- Nationality: German
- Born: 7 January 1950 (age 75); Celle, Germany

Sport
- Sport: Volleyball

Hans-Georg von der Ohe (born 7 January 1950) is a German volleyball player. He competed in the men's tournament at the 1972 Summer Olympics.
