= Hatto Nolte =

German volleyball player (born 1948)

Personal information
- Nationality: German
- Born: 23 September 1948 (age 76); Delmenhorst, Germany

Sport
- Sport: Volleyball

Hatto Nolte (born 23 September 1948) is a German volleyball player. He competed in the men's tournament at the 1972 Summer Olympics.
