= Volker Paulus =

German volleyball player (born 1947)

Personal information
- Nationality: German
- Born: 2 August 1947 (age 77); Giessen, Germany

Sport
- Sport: Volleyball

Volker Paulus (born 2 August 1947) is a German volleyball player. He competed in the men's tournament at the 1972 Summer Olympics.
