= Ulf Tütken =

German volleyball player (born 1953)

Personal information
- Nationality: German
- Born: 31 May 1953 (age 71); Delmenhorst, Germany

Sport
- Sport: Volleyball

Ulf Tütken (born 31 May 1953) is a German volleyball player. He competed in the men's tournament at the 1972 Summer Olympics.
