= Emil Assad Rached =

Brazilian basketball player (1943–2009)

Medal record

Men's basketball

Representing Brazil

World Championship
Bronze medal – third place	1967 Montevideo	Team

Emil Assad Rached (June 20, 1943 in Vera Cruz – October 15, 2009 in Campinas) was a Brazilian basketball player of Lebanese origin. In Brazil, he was commonly referred to as O Gigante ("The Giant").

He started his career in Palmeiras in 1964 and played basketball professionally up to 1980 for five more teams: XV de Piracicaba (SP), Corinthians (SP), Botafogo (RJ), Tênis Cube de Campinas (SP) and Rio Claro (SP). Rached participated at the 1967 FIBA World Championship with the Brazil national basketball team. At 2.20 meters (7 ft 3 in), he was the tallest Brazilian player ever. For five years, he was part of the Brazilian national team. He won a bronze medal at the World Championships in Uruguay (1967), a gold medal in the Pan American Games in Cali (1971) and placed second in South America Argentina (1966). He scored 114 points in 18 official matches for Brazil.

After retiring from basketball, he had an acting career, most notably participation in a very popular Brazilian comedy TV show called Os Trapalhões and some movies with the same group.
