= Klaus Meetz =

German volleyball player (born 1946)

Personal information
- Nationality: German
- Born: 23 May 1946 (age 78); Hamburg, Germany

Sport
- Sport: Volleyball

Klaus Meetz (born 23 May 1946) is a German volleyball player. He competed in the men's tournament at the 1972 Summer Olympics.
