= Mircea Tutovan-Codoi =

Romanian volleyball player (1952–2024)

Personal information
- Nationality: Romanian
- Born: 13 March 1952 Nemșa, Romania
- Died: 15 January 2024 (aged 71) Biușa, Romania

Sport
- Sport: Volleyball

Mircea Tutovan-Codoi (13 March 1952 – 15 January 2024) was a Romanian volleyball player. He competed in the men's tournament at the 1972 Summer Olympics.
