= Uwe Zitranski =

German volleyball player (born 1941)

Personal information
- Nationality: German
- Born: 7 August 1941 (age 83); Freiburg im Breisgau, Germany

Sport
- Sport: Volleyball

Uwe Zitranski (born 7 August 1941) is a retired German volleyball player. He competed in the men's tournament at the 1972 Summer Olympics.
