= Mário Procopio =

Brazilian volleyball player (born 1948)

Personal information
- Born: 16 November 1948 (age 76); Belo Horizonte, Brazil

Sport
- Sport: Volleyball

Mário Procopio (born 16 November 1948) is a Brazilian volleyball player. He competed in the men's tournament at the 1972 Summer Olympics.
