= Rüdiger Hild =

German volleyball player (born 1949)

Personal information
- Nationality: German
- Born: 23 April 1949 (age 75); Darmstadt, Germany

Sport
- Sport: Volleyball

Rüdiger Hild (born 23 April 1949) is a German volleyball player. He competed in the men's tournament at the 1972 Summer Olympics.
