= Décio Cattaruzzi =

Brazilian volleyball player (born 1948)

Personal information
- Born: 13 November 1948 (age 76); Santo André, Brazil

Sport
- Sport: Volleyball

Décio Cattaruzzi (born 13 November 1948) is a Brazilian former volleyball player. He competed in the men's tournament at the 1972 Summer Olympics.
