= Aderval Arvani =

Brazilian volleyball player (born 1949)

Personal information
- Born: 7 January 1949 (age 76); São Paulo, Brazil

Sport
- Sport: Volleyball

Aderval Arvani (born 7 January 1949) is a Brazilian volleyball player. He competed in the men's tournament at the 1972 Summer Olympics.
