= 2012–2014 Romanian protests against shale gas =

Environmental protests in Romania

- Part of 2012–2015 unrest in Romania
- Location of protests
- Date: 21 March 2012 – 26 November 2014 (2 years, 8 months and 5 days)
- Location: Dozens of cities in Romania and Romanian diaspora
- Caused by: Exploitation of shale gas through hydraulic fracturing; Installation of gas derricks in areas of exploitation; Uncertain position of politicians on the project; Police brutality
- Goals: Banning shale drilling in Romania; Resignation of Ponta Government
- Methods: Protest march; Human chain; Occupation; Revolt; Civil resistance; Roadblock; Hunger strike; Internet activism
- Status: Ended
- Concessions: Dismissal of Ungureanu Government through a motion of censure; Suspension of shale gas exploration in Pungești area; Interruption of shale gas exploitation in Moșna-Alma Vii area; Chevron's withdrawal from Romania

Parties
Students; Teachers; Priests; Environmentalists; Activists	Gendarmes; Police officers

Number
Up to 50,000; 30,000 in Bârlad; 4,000 in Bucharest; 1,500 in Curtici; 1,000 in Pungești; 1,000 in Sânmartin	Up to 2,000

Casualties and losses
Arrests: 53; Injuries: 17	Injuries: 1

The 2012–2014 Romanian protests against shale gas were a series of protests in major Romanian cities against exploitation of shale gas through controversial method of hydraulic fracturing. The main causes of these protests were the pollution of groundwater and environment, but also the threat of generating earthquakes. The protesters claimed the resignation of Prime Minister Victor Ponta, because he suddenly changed his position on the project. Before the electoral campaign of 2012, he opposed shale drilling, but after he supported it with any risks, on the grounds that Romania's energy independence is a national project.

The protests began with peaceful movements against shale drilling organized on social networking websites. The protests degenerated in fierce clashes between law enforcers and demonstrators, with dozens of people injured on both sides. According to different sources, these are the most violent events in Romania since the 2012 anti-presidential protests.

== Background ==
=== Potential reserves of shale gas ===
The U.S. Energy Information Administration estimates that Romania has technically recoverable shale gas reserves (undiscovered, that could be accessed with existing technology) of 51,000 cubic feet, namely 1,444 billion cubic meters. According to the EIA report, Romania ranks third in EU shale gas reserves, after Poland (4,190 billion cubic meters) and France (3,879 billion cubic meters). This quantity could cover the national consumption of gas for 100 years.

A study by the Romanian National Committee of World Energy Council shows that Romania has a high potential for shale gas discoveries in the Eastern Carpathians, the Moldavian Platform, the Bârlad Plateau and the Romanian Plain, with its expansion of Southern Dobruja.

=== Changing positions of Prime Minister ===
Ponta had numerous positions on shale gas exploitation. Before the 2012 legislative elections, he was a fervid opponent of shale gas. On 5 June 2012, he even received the "Young ecologist hope" prize during the 2012 Green Awards Gala that took place at Green Hours, Bucharest. After being confirmed as prime minister, he suddenly changed his position on shale drilling in Romania, stating in a TV show that "Now I'm fighting for shale gas, and I think I'm doing a good thing. I'm not anti-Russian [...], but I would like to stop importing from Gazprom". This change of heart of the Prime Minister sparked the indignation of environmentalists and activists. After that, many of his former supporters started to request his resignation.

=== Effects of shale drilling ===
The Chevron Corporation has been fined several times for environmental pollution.

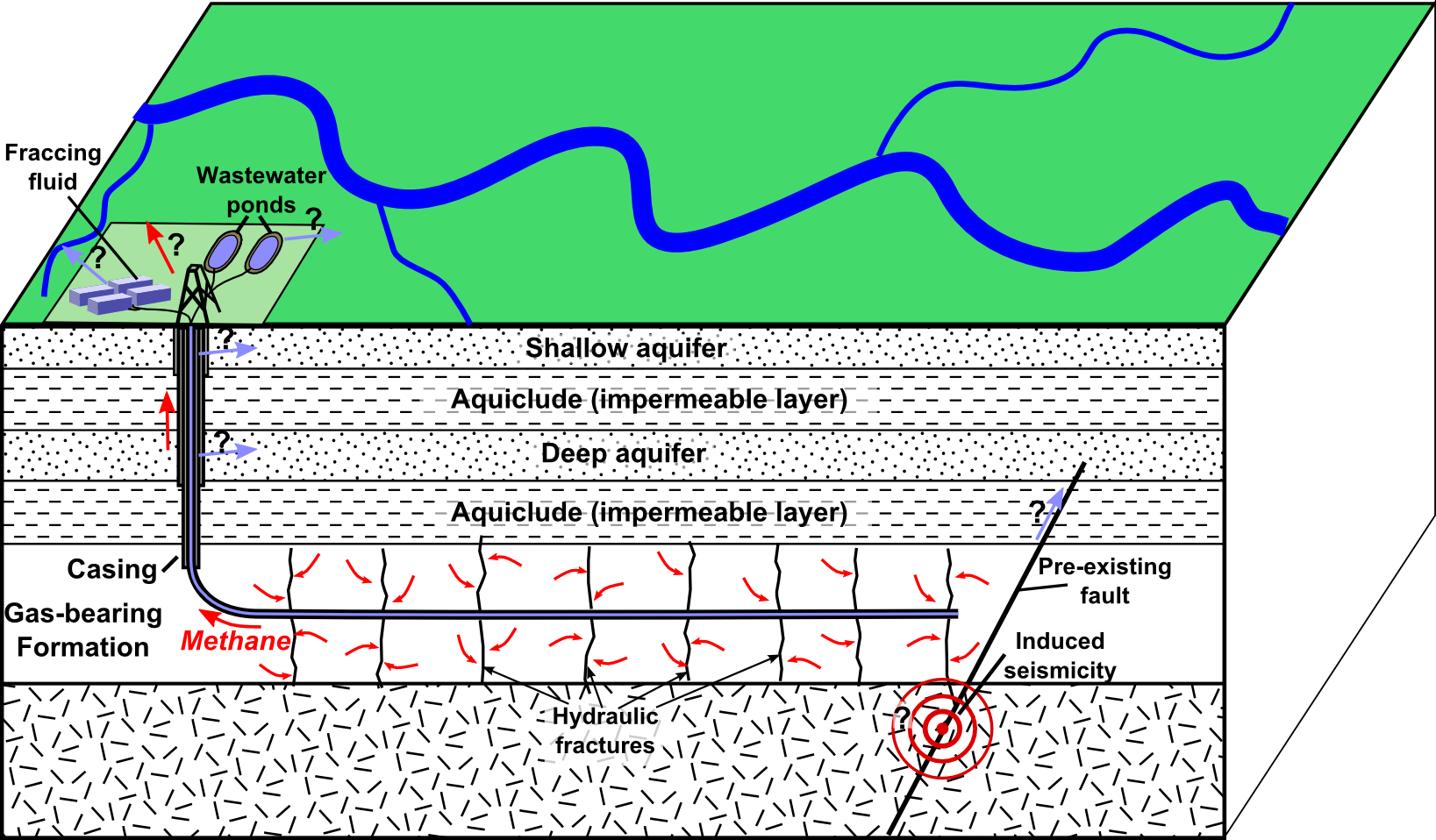
Schematic depiction of hydraulic fracturing, showing main possible environmental effects

Mass demonstrations in Bârlad, Vaslui County, were mainly triggered by the harmful effects of hydraulic fractionation used in shale drilling. The hydraulic fractionation is a method of shale gas extraction, that involves pumping water, sand and additives deep in the lithosphere, to break the layer of rock and release the gas. The additives used include about 750 compounds, some of which are carcinogenic. Environmentalists claim that the exploitation through hydraulic fractionation pollute groundwater. Moreover, it is possible that earthquake activity increases, after destabilization of rock layers.

In this way, American director Josh Fox created in 2010 the documentary Gasland. The film, nominated for Oscars and screened at Sundance Film Festival, shows the size of shale drilling danger to the community and the environment. The film sparked thousands of negative reactions from the public.

In several European countries, including Bulgaria, France, Netherlands, Luxembourg and Czech Republic, this method of gas extraction was prohibited.

In 2011, a court in Ecuador fined Chevron $8.6 billion for pollution of the Amazon rainforest. Chevron has also violated foreign governments environmental laws in Brazil, Angola and Bangladesh.

== 2012 protests ==
=== Bârlad demonstrations ===
The protests in Bârlad started with a 5,000-large manifestation in Central Square, on 22 March 2012. The protest was preceded by a march that started on two fronts. The event was attended by students, teachers, employees of factories in the city, local authorities and priests, some of them taking the word at the rostrum placed in front of the City Hall. Four days after the protest, Chevron Corporation representatives expressed their official position regarding the techniques they will use in exploration and exploitation of shale gas in northeastern Romania. "We understand the concerns about shale gas production in Romania and we believe that after Chevron will present accurate information resulting from research, Romanians will understand that natural shale gas is a clean energy source, which can be produced responsibly and safely", said in a press release Tom Holst, Chevron Romania country manager.

The protests continued in the following months. Thus, on 26 April, thousands of people gathered in Bârlad Civic Center to protest against Chevron presence in the country. During protest, priests sang the Paschal greeting, and people sang the anthem of Romania. The protesters were mobilised on social networking websites. On 8 September, 2,000 people marched peacefully with lit candles and lamps, led by priests in the area.

==== Proclamation of Bârlad ====
On 22 March 2012, residents of Bârlad municipality drew up a proclamation that includes an elaborate list of harmful effects of shale gas exploitation through hydraulic fracturing, but also a series of strict claims. They ask the Government of Romania to impose the National Agency for Mineral Resources the immediate cancellation or suspension of concession petroleum agreements for exploration/exploitation of liquid or gaseous hydrocarbons through hydraulic fracturing method of rocks. Another claims include prohibiting the use of this method in Romania and completing environmental legislation with necessary measures to avoid the risk of pollution resulted from exploitation.

== 2013 protests ==
External media

Images
- Protests in Pungești on Flickr
- Pungești, a special day on AFP

Video
- Meeting in Bârlad. 8,700 people in the street against shale drilling on YouTube
- Protest in Bârlad against shale drilling by U.S. company Chevron on YouTube
- Great march of Bârlad on YouTube
- April 4, 2013. Protest against shale gas extraction on YouTube

On 27 February 2013, at the call of the Civil Society Initiative Group of Bârlad, about 8,700 people took to the streets to shout "No to exploitation of shale gas". The event was attended by people of all ages from all Vaslui County, but also from Constanța, Galați, Buzău and Bucharest. Those attending the event shouted slogans against the current government and cataloged local politicians as traitors. To avoid any incidents, 80 gendarmes, which were joined by local police crews, assured the public policy measures.

On 4 April, with the occasion of "Global Anti-Fracking Day", in 28 localities in the country were held protests and demonstrations against exploitation of shale gas through hydraulic fracturing. Likewise, the Romanians in Strasbourg and Copenhagen have joined the protests, as well as activists from the Czech Republic, from four cities in Bulgaria and Australia. A similar protest took place in 2014. This was larger and was attended by thousands of people in 100 localities in Romania and 10 abroad.

On 27 May, at least 10,000 locals protested in Bârlad, dissatisfied that the Environment Ministry has issued permits for gas exploration in Bârlad, Costinești and Vama Veche. They also expressed anger against Prime Minister Victor Ponta, accusing him of flip-flopping on his position regarding the shale gas. On Facebook were created dozens of pages against exploitation of shale gas, joined by tens of thousands of people.

On 1 September, Bârlad Initiative Group of Civil Society organized a meeting against starting the exploration of shale in EV2 area, attended by more than 4,000 people. The gendarmes intervened to release traffic in St. Elias Square, blocked by protesters. All those present chanted messages against the current government, but also against mayor Constantin Constaninescu, who was accused that refused to approve certain routes for the protest march and agreed to conduct this meeting in an isolated area.

=== Revolt of Pungești ===
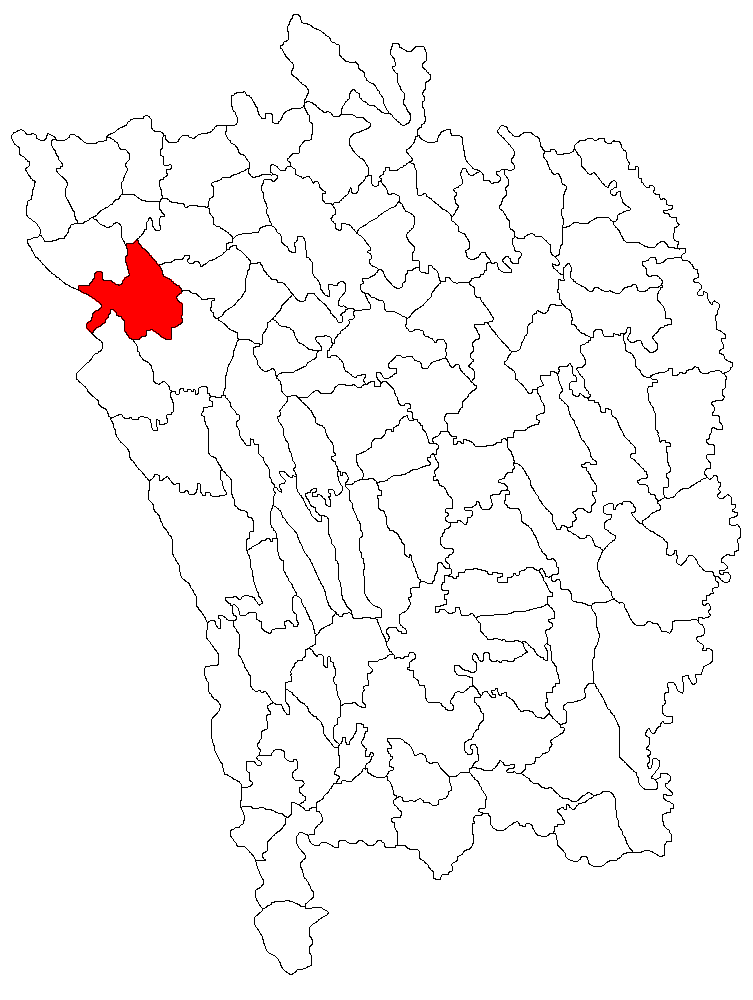
Location of Pungești within the Vaslui County

The Revolt of Pungești (Romanian: Revolta de la Pungești) erupted a few days after Chevron obtained a building permit for the location of first derrick for shale drilling in Vaslui County. More than that, the company has received all necessary approvals from state authorities for soil exploration in a perimeter within the Siliştea village in Pungești.

==== 14–16 October 2013 ====
The manifestations started with 150 protesters, on 14 October 2013, blocking the access of Chevron machineries to install the derrick. Protests have escalated in the next three days. Thus, on 16 October, more than 500 villagers of Pungești and surrounding localities, joined by activists from Bârlad, Iași and Bucharest, formed a human shield in front of the bulldozers. On the spot were mobilised over 200 gendarmes, because the Vaslui–Gârceni county road was blocked by angry protesters. Likewise, the gendarmes formed a cordon meant to release the traffic. The protesters tried to break the cordon, but the gendarmes intervened in force. In fierce clashes between protesters and gendarmes 10 people were injured, including an 81-year-old man who suffered a panic attack. According to journalists from Realitatea TV, the old man died a few hours later at Vaslui County Emergency Hospital.

The protesters installed tents and gathered food and warm clothes, as they continued their protest overnight. They also created an Internet TV channel, TV Pungești, that covers 24 hours of 24 the events on the protest camping site. Even if it does not appear on the TV program grid, TV Pungești amassed up to 75,000 views in a month and a half.

==== 2–31 December 2013 ====
After Chevron representatives announced the suspension of works in the area, civil conflicts have subsided. This period of lull lasted only a month. On 2 December, when Chevron decided to resume exploration operations, an impressive convoy of gendarmes, police and firefighters went to the area before the break of dawn to secure the movement of Chevron machineries. Gendarmes occupied the village, blocking all access points, preventing entry or exit from the perimeter for 24 hours.

Early in the morning, about 100 villagers blocked the road, trying to obstruct the access of Chevron equipment on the concessioned land. Hundreds of gendarmes were mobilised on the spot and ordered the protesters to clear the way. While activists claim that around 1,000 law enforcers were taking part in the operation, police put the number at 300. Journalists were reportedly not permitted to get to the scene. Witnesses said the gendarmes used excessive force to restain some protesters. In the ensuing clashes, two people were injured and 30 were loaded into vans and transported to the police station. Victor Ponta congratulated the gendarmes for the way they acted, saying that energy independence is a major national project. "We won't accept for 20, 30, 50, 70 people to break the law!", transmitted the Premier. But others are demanding investigation. Maria-Nicoleta Andreescu, executive director of the Helsinki Committee Association for the defence of human rights in Romania, said: "There are important signs that indicate that the gendarmes' actions were at least abusive if not illegal. It is very clear is [sic] that by restricting the access of the press in the area the authorities did not allow the public to be informed".

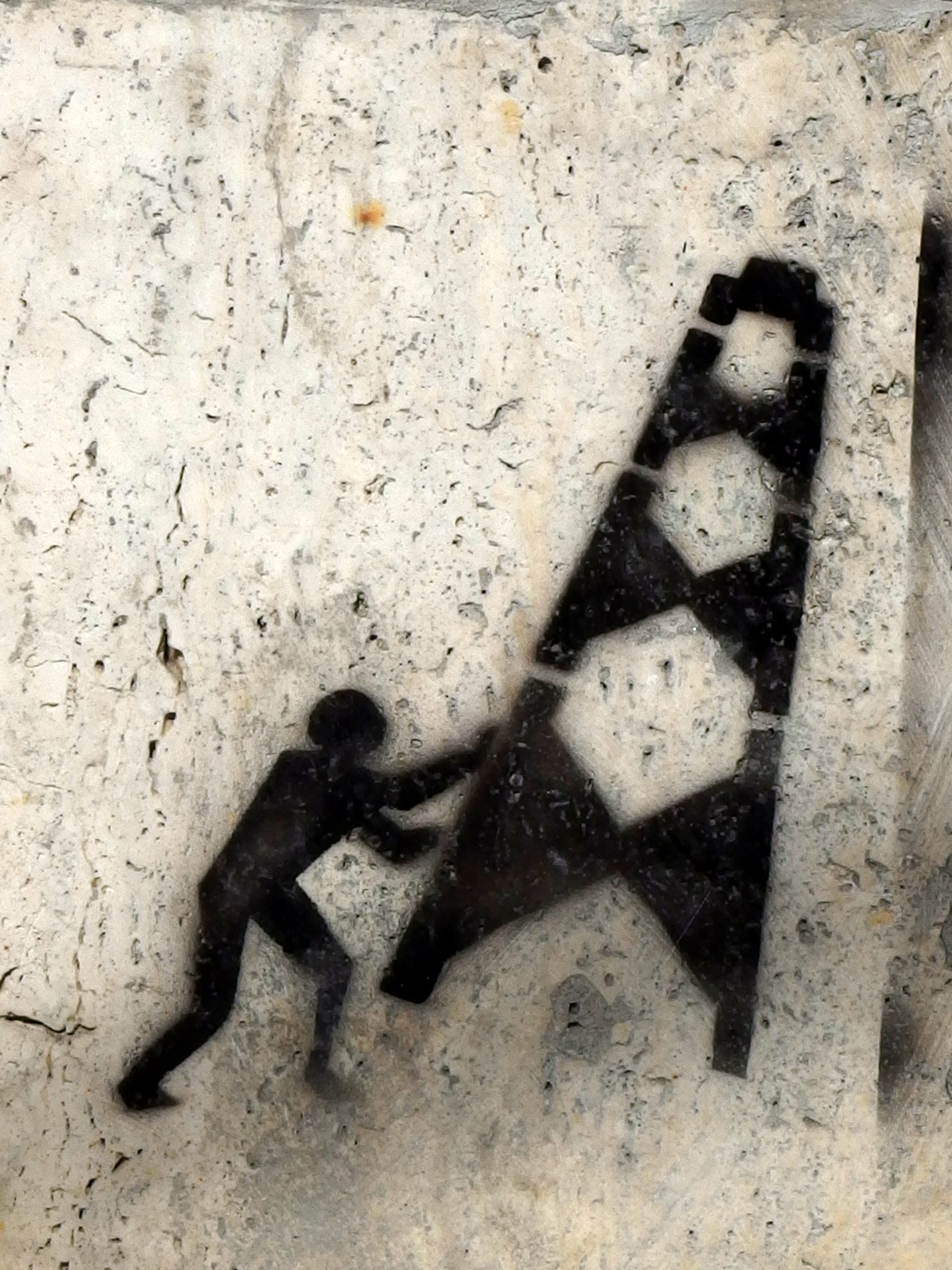
Graffiti on a wall in Bucharest depicting a man tearing down a gas well, symbol of resistance against shale gas

The protests continued in the following days. On 7 December, despite very low temperatures, nearly 600 people from several cities of the country protested against Chevron and its intention to exploit the potential reserves of shale gas. At the spot were sent intervention troops of the Gendarmerie, fact that angered the protesters. People posed in front of them and shouted "Revolution".

Protests escalated, and elders, women and children rushed to fight against the gendarmes, throwing firecrackers. Security forces used tear gas and formed a human shield around the plot of land where Chevron would install the first derrick in Romania. Protesters broke the cordon of gendarmes and penetrated into the land concessioned to Chevron. Angry people threw stones at gendarmes and knocked down the entire perimeter fence installed by the U.S. company workers. Gendarmes regrouped and responded in force. A young man of about 25 years was hit in the head during clashes between law enforcers and demonstrators. He was transported to the Vaslui Emergency Hospital by a SMURD ambulance. The vans with the 22 people arrested during altercations were stopped by 50 protesters that laid on the roadway.

On 8 December, Chevron announced that it has resumed work in the commune of Pungești, after, the day before, they suspended operations because of violent demonstrations. As a result, activists tried to recoil and protest in neighboring localities, but their demarches have been hampered by the gendarmes. They studded the area, patrolled and organized filters from 100 to 100 meters, legitimating everyone trying to get out of Pungești. Moreover, gendarmes raided the impromptu camp of protesters, because of some pyrotechnic materials they found there. A team of public television journalists was assaulted by gendarmes and was banned from filming in the area. Villagers say they were aggressed by law enforcers.

The leadership of Vaslui Police issued a disposition according to which the commune of Pungești becomes "special area of public safety" (comparable to a state of emergency), fact that requires strict control of people and vehicles crossing the locality. Former Minister of the Environment, Sulfina Barbu, pointed out that the actions of authorities against protests in Pungești are anti-democratic. "Since the Government makes such extreme and anti-democratic measures (setting up a special safety area in Siliștea-Pungești – n.r.), I think that we're discussing about restrictions of civil rights", she said. On 26 March 2014, the Ombudsman sent a recommendation to the Minister of Internal Affairs on the respecting of citizen rights and freedoms, in the context of establishing a "special area of public safety". IA showed that tensions in Pungești and attempts of unauthorized demonstrations continue, prerequisites for the establishment of special area of public safety remaining valid.

On 24 December, 40 villagers of Pungești and activists went on hunger strike. Locals have raised more tents and announced that they go on an indefinitely-long hunger strike. Their action is a gesture of solidarity with Alexandru Popescu, a 45-year-old antiquarian from Bărcănești, Prahova County, who is on a hunger strike in Bucharest's University Square since 21 December. Two strikers needed medical attention and called an ambulance. The perimeter was surrounded by gendarmes, protesters accusing aggression by law enforcers. After 10 days of hunger strike, protesters were forced to renounce to this form of protest, because, they say, were banished by the gendarmes.

==== 1 January – 1 May 2014 ====
On 2 January, hundreds of villagers from Siliștea organized a rally and then a protest march to the Pungești Town Hall to demand the resignation of Mayor Mircia Vlasă and the stoppage of shale gas exploration in the area. Citizens were joined by Vaslui MP Tudor Ciuhodaru, local councilors from several communes in the county and the Mayor of Șuletea, Ciprian Tamaș. Ten people received warning for participating in an unauthorized protest.

On 5 January, around 100 protesters gathered at an anti-Chevron encampment near Pungești, to pray and perform religious rituals in an attempt to drive out Chevron. Priest Gheorghe Tomozei described Chevron's operations as "a Satanic invasion". After a short religious service, protesters walked to a police checkpoint that separates the village from the Chevron site but were stopped by riot police as they attempted to enter the area. Protesters shouted "Thieves" and "Down with Chevron", and later demonstrated near the town hall calling for the mayor's resignation.

On 8 April, up to 200 villagers from Pungești and neighboring communes gathered near the Chevron site to protest against company's intention to begin shale gas exploration. Protesters threw eggs and apples at Chevron coach and thrust with law enforcers. The same month, on 25, another incident occurred in Pungești. Then, the mayor of the commune was hiding in his office in the city hall, while an angry crowd demanded his resignation.

During the rustic celebration of 1 May, a child was beaten by gendarmes after a group of protesters approached the land owned by Chevron. He was taken by ambulance to Vaslui County Hospital with a fracture of the right arm.

==== Reactions ====
Protests of solidarity took place in Bucharest, Cluj-Napoca, Timișoara, and Sibiu. In Bucharest, more than 4,000 people gathered in University Square, from where they marched to the Government headquarters in Victory Square. During the manifestation, the traffic was blocked and directed on detour routes. Column of demonstrators was accompanied at all times by gendarmes. In an attempt to release the Victory Square, things were precipitated. The protesters clashed with gendarmes, and a woman fainted. They demanded the resignation of Prime Minister Victor Ponta, accusing him of treason and falsehood. They threatened to radicalize the rallies using the Greek model and chanted slogans like "Last resort, another revolution" and "Ponta and Băsescu near Ceaușescu".

In a document signed and initialed by Director of School no. 1 of Pungești, it appears that the leadership of Vaslui County School Inspectorate prohibits teachers and students from leaving classes to attend the protest against shale gas. During a meeting of local councilors it was agreed to hold a local referendum about the use or banning of shale gas exploration and exploitation in the commune. Furthermore, one of the councilors demanded the resignation of the mayor be added to that referendum. The prime minister called for a report from the Minister of Internal Affairs Radu Stroe about how the gendarmes acted in Pungești.

Representatives of the Chevron company announced, on 17 October, the suspension of work on shale gas exploration in Siliștea, Pungești commune. The company also said it plans to pursue other exploration operations, and did not rule out the possibility of returning to Pungești.

The Royal House of Romania issued a press release in which it deplores the situation of Pungești locals and condemns the violence against "citizens of the Romanian state". The communiqué also notes, "Sovereignty belongs to the people, and the citizens must be consulted and listened to for any decision that may affect their right to health and future".

On 14 December, the Romanian Ombudsman took a stand about the situation in Pungești. Institution representatives went to the area to talk to local officials, Gendarmerie representatives and participants in the protests.

A group of eleven Green MEPs from six countries (France, Germany, United Kingdom, Spain, Belgium and Luxembourg) sent an open letter to the President of the European Parliament, Martin Schulz, notifying on and condemning the manner in which the Government from Bucharest acts abusively against citizens of a community in Romania (Pungești), because of the interests of a private company. They claim violation of the rule of law and violation of rights and freedoms of European citizens including: right to physical integrity, right to private property, freedom of movement, freedom of expression and right to be informed.

=== Resistance of Moșna ===
Several villagers from Moșna, Sibiu County, revolted against the intention of Prospecțiuni S.A. employees to drill for potential shale gas reserves without the approval of the landowners. The company belongs to Ovidiu Tender, an influential Romanian businessman.

Willy Schuster, a German resident from Moșna, accused company employees that violated his household, trespassed and destroyed his goods. In May–June 2012, the dairy producer from Moșna, one of the leaders of the ecological farming movement in Romania, gathered tens of meters of cable on land he owns, all assembled by employees of the company that makes prospections in the region.

On 16 November, more than 100 activists from the counties of Iași, Harghita, Sibiu, Brașov and Hunedoara joined the revolted villagers and protested against abuse of private property of residents. People also said that substances used in exploitation affect bio cultures.

An SUV of Prospecțiuni was surrounded by protesters, after the vehicle tried to enter the property of Willy Schuster. Police intervened and settled the conflict. The villagers removed cables from their lands. The director of seismic works, Gheorghe Dăianu, threatened with violence and insulted protesters. Dăianu attempted to recover the cables from the Cultural House of Alma Vii, but barely escaped the fury of the crowd.

Local television station Nova TV from Mediaș reported that 17 cars of Prospecțiuni company were found with cut tires, in front of the hotel where the employees were staying. The activists denied involvement in the incident, showing that their protest was peaceful and aimed solely against abuse of private property of residents from Moșna and Alma Vii. There were even some who have suggested that company employees could have cut their own tires, in an attempt to "victimize".

Mihail Mitroi, vice-president of Prospecțiuni S.A., said that the company decided to stop work in the Moșna area after the protests of residents. Mitroi asserted that the company had suffered damages of 50,000 euros after actions of activists and mentioned that Prospecțiuni S.A. will act judicially for the recovery of damages.

Prospecțiuni S.A. is now prosecuted by Sibiu County Police Inspectorate for trespassing, because of stretched cables with sensors for exploration on Willy Schuster's lands, without his consent. Tender's company is accused of violating several normative acts, including the Constitution, which guarantees the right to property.

=== Protests for saving Băile Felix ===
Băile Felix is a thermal spa resort of national interest. It risks to be closed after the Ponta Government approved the exploitation of shale gas in the area. According to the decision taken on 26 November 2013, the Government approved oil concession agreement for exploration, development and exploitation in the 3 Băile Felix perimeter by the East West Petroleum Corporation, a Canadian company with operations in the United States, India, New Zealand and Morocco.

On 21 December, nearly 1,000 people protested in the Central Park of the commune of Sînmartin for fear that, after the installation of derricks, the Băile Felix resort will be destroyed. The meeting was held under the supervision of police and gendarmes.

In the commune of Sînmartin, authorities started a campaign to collect signatures against shale drilling, with over 4,000 signatures having been collected so far.

== 2014 protests ==
=== Arad County demonstrations ===
On 1 February 2014, over 1,500 residents of Curtici and other 11 nearby localities attended a public meeting of protest against shale gas exploration in the area. The meeting was attended, among others, by Dimitrie Muscă, Director of the Curtici Agroindustrial Complex, Nicolae A. Aniței, Mayor of Curtici, mayors of other localities in the area, Orthodox priests and pastors of neo-Protestant churches in the area. To avoid the eventual occurrence of unwanted events, in the area were deployed forces of gendarmes and policemen ready to intervene.

A similar protest took place in Macea, on 16 February, and was attended by more than 1,000 people.

The protests are a reaction to the decision of Hungarian company Panfora Oil to start the search of petroleum and natural gas in the area. Contrary to those declared by the Hungarian company, locals say that the searches are actually targeting the shale gas.

== Consequences ==
In April 2012, less than three months after it took office, Romania's Ungureanu government has fallen. The centre-right administration, led by Mihai Răzvan Ungureanu, a former foreign-intelligence chief, lost a no-confidence vote filed by the left-wing opposition.

"Today there was justice", said Victor Ponta, after securing 235 votes in favour of his motion, four more than he needed. "We don't want any more dubious firms, no more selling under the market price and huge bribes", he said in a five-hour-long debate that preceded the vote. He was referring, in part, to the government's granting of shale gas concessions to Chevron. In the motion of censure that overthrew the Ungureanu Government, Ponta and USL MPs accused the power of signing contracts only with the U.S. company, although "there were other companies that would have wanted to enter into such agreements with the Romanian authorities".

== Reaction of authorities ==
Former Environment Minister Sulfina Barbu accused the government of "lying" about shale gas. She said that protests in Bârlad on shale gas are "people's reaction to babbling and lies of USL Government". According to protesters, Liviu Dragnea and Victor Ponta provide misinformation about the risks of shale drilling, and the Environment Minister Rovana Plumb argues that environmental permits are not even required in order to start exploration. In a television broadcast, the Economy Minister Varujan Vosganian said that "the shale gas can not be exploited without huge risks". In another train of thoughts, Prime Minister Victor Ponta supports shale gas exploration, but in compliance with European and international standards for environmental protection. PNL senator for Brașov, Sebastian Grapa, called for the establishment of a parliamentary commission of inquiry about the effects of shale drilling, given that Prime Minister Victor Ponta said he would "beat" for the use of these resources.

In the United States, the most important center for strategic studies in Washington, CSIS, released a report entitled "Hidden war against the exploitation of shale gas". Americans' conclusion was that the Russians staged uprisings against shale gas and they would directly or indirectly finance the so-called environmental organizations that protest. The American report bears the signature of the most important U.S. energy analyst, Keith Smith. The report indicates that Romania is in the midst of a campaign of manipulation and diversion, with huge political and economic stakes.

In several dozen communes in the Vaslui County, mayors and local councils have banned shale gas exploitation, arguing that it would harm the environment, or drinking water. The decisions approved by local councils and supported by resident population are considered out-of-scope (and thus not legally binding) by the Government. In this way, the communes were urged to revoke bans on shale gas exploitation. More than that, Vaslui County Prefecture brought to court 11 decisions made by local councils, that disagree with the exploitations. The Prefecture invokes an article of the Constitution, according to which deposits are owned by the state and local council approval is not required. In reply, mayors of the communes where derricks will be installed say they will not abandon the idea of banning the Canadian company's presence in the areas they lead.

President Traian Băsescu also had a reaction on this issue. In a press conference in June 2013, he said that he supports the projects related to shale gas. Likewise, he said that shale gas exploitation is a matter of confidence from the Government.

== See also ==
- 2013 Romanian protests against the Roșia Montană Project
- Anti-fracking movement
- List of protests in the 21st century
