= Pungești =

- Commune
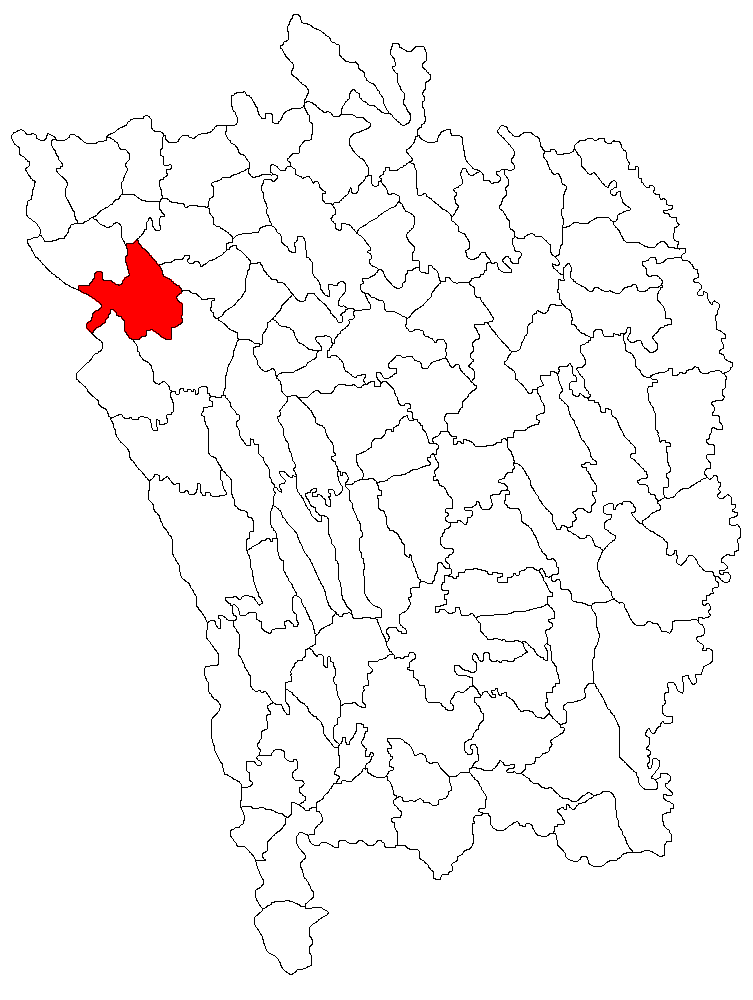
- Location in Vaslui County

- Location in Romania
- Coordinates: 46°42′N 27°20′E
- Country: Romania
- County: Vaslui

Government
  - Mayor (2020–2024): Nicolae-Cătălin Stamate (PSD)
- Area: 71 km^{2} (27 sq mi)
- Elevation: 190 m (620 ft)
- Population (2021-12-01): 2,840
  - Density: 40/km^{2} (100/sq mi)
- Time zone: EET/EEST (UTC+2/+3)
- Postal code: 737445
- Area code: +(40) 235
- Vehicle reg.: VS

Pungești is a commune in Vaslui County, Western Moldavia, Romania. It is composed of nine villages: Armășoaia, Cursești-Deal, Cursești-Vale, Hordila, Pungești, Rapșa, Siliștea, Stejaru, and Toporăști.

Pungești is situated in the northwestern region of Vaslui County.

In late 2013, Pungești became a center of protests against shale gas exploitation through hydraulic fracturing.

== Natives ==
- Mirela Lavric (born 1991), track and field athlete
