= Hans-Ulrich Graßhoff =

German volleyball player (born 1943)

Personal information
- Nationality: German
- Born: 28 January 1943 (age 82); Halle, Germany

Sport
- Sport: Volleyball

Hans-Ulrich Graßhoff (born 28 January 1943) is a German volleyball player. He competed in the men's tournament at the 1972 Summer Olympics.
