= Moșna, Sibiu =

Moșna
- Commune
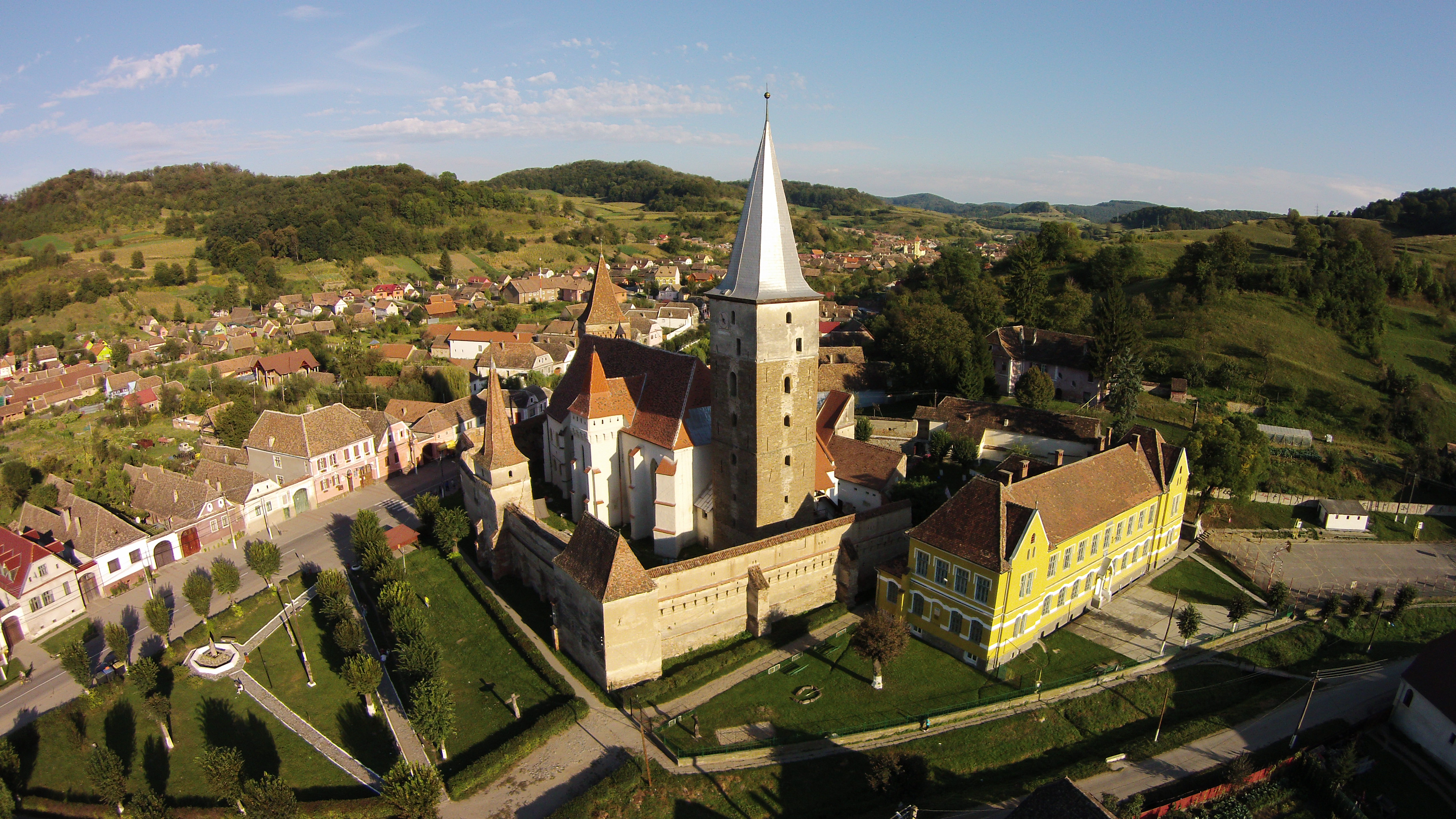
- Aerial view of the Saxon fortified church of Moșna

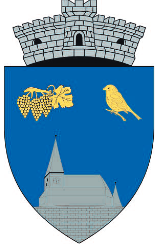
- Coat of arms

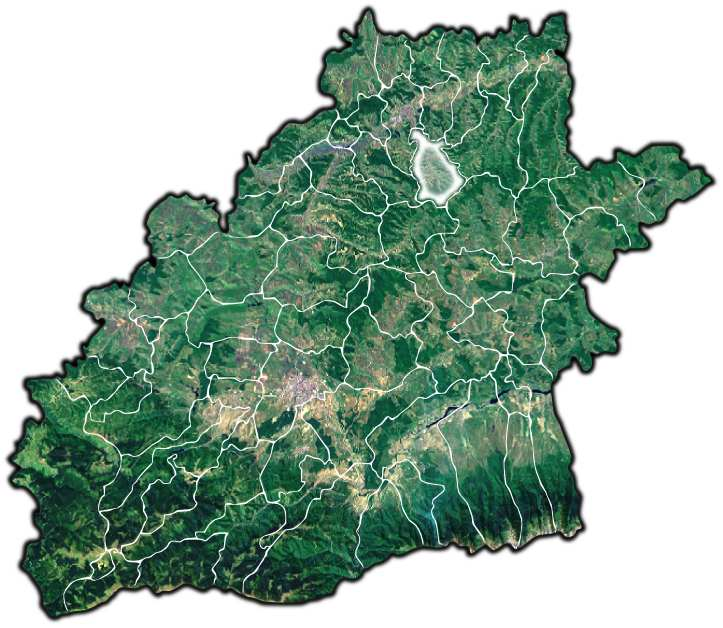
- Location in Sibiu County

- Location in Romania
- Coordinates: 46.0906°N 24.3994°E
- Country: Romania
- County: Sibiu

Government
  - Mayor (2020–2024): Dumitru-Gabriel Nuțu (PNL)
- Area: 59.33 km^{2} (22.91 sq mi)
- Elevation: 268 m (879 ft)
- Population (2021-12-01): 2,939
  - Density: 49.54/km^{2} (128.3/sq mi)
- Time zone: UTC+02:00 (EET)
  - Summer (DST): UTC+03:00 (EEST)
- Postal code: 557160
- Area code: (+40) 0269
- Vehicle reg.: SB
- Website: comunamosna.ro

Moșna (German: Meschen; Hungarian: Muzsna) is a commune located in Sibiu County, Transylvania, Romania. It is composed of three villages: Alma Vii (Almen; Szászalmád), Moșna, and Nemșa (Nimesch; Nemes). All three have fortified churches, although the fortifications in Nemșa are far less well-preserved.

The commune is situated on the Transylvanian Plateau, in the northern part of the county. It lies at a distance of 10 km (6.2 mi) from Mediaș and 73 km (45 mi) from the county seat, Sibiu. The river Calva flows through Alma Vii.

The territory of the commune is the site of potential shale gas reserves; protests against drilling erupted in Moșna and Alma Vii in 2012–2013.

At the 2011 census, the commune had 3,335 inhabitants, of which 84% were Romanians, 12.6% Roma, 1.8% Hungarians, and 1.5% Germans. At the 2021 census, Moșna had a population of 2,939; of those, 85.68% were Romanians and 1,53% Roma.

== Natives ==
- Fritz Connert (1883–1945), politician representing the German ethnic group and agriculturalists
- Horst Schuller Anger (1940–2021), philologist and journalist
- Mircea Tutovan-Codoi (1952–2024), volleyball player

== Gallery ==
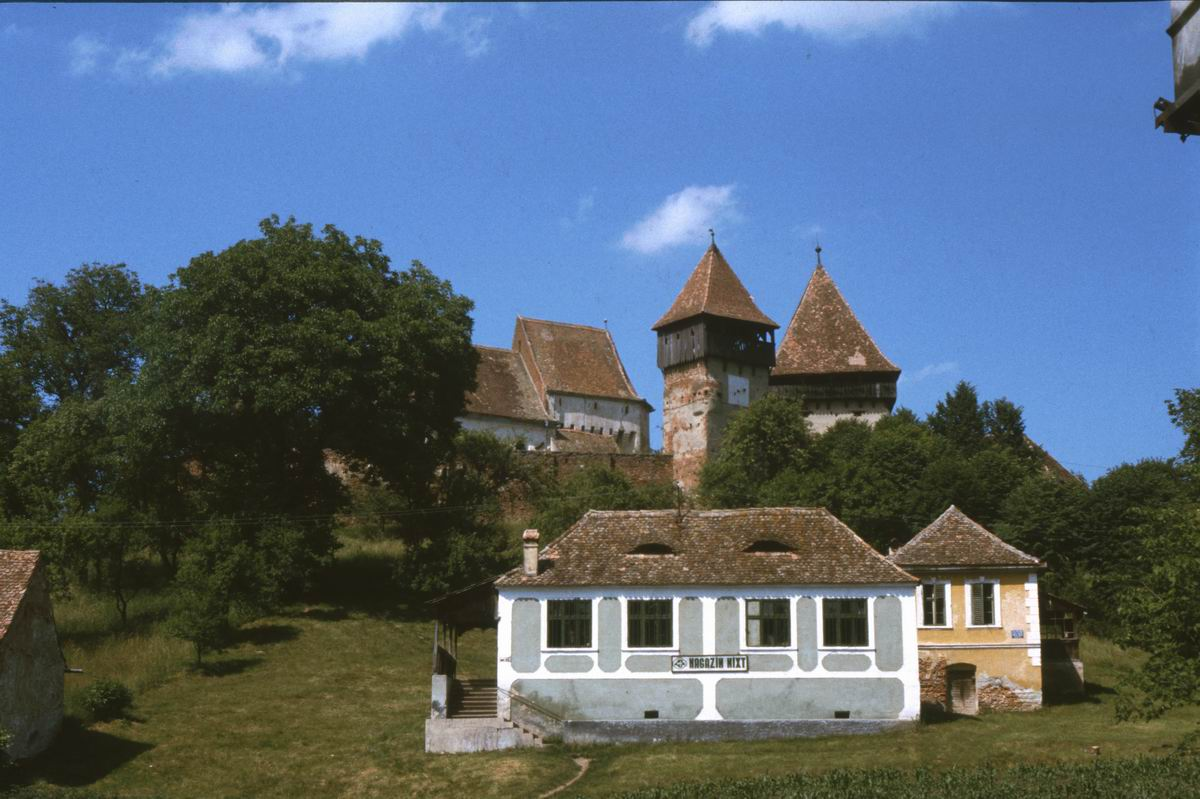
Alma Vii, the Saxon fortified church

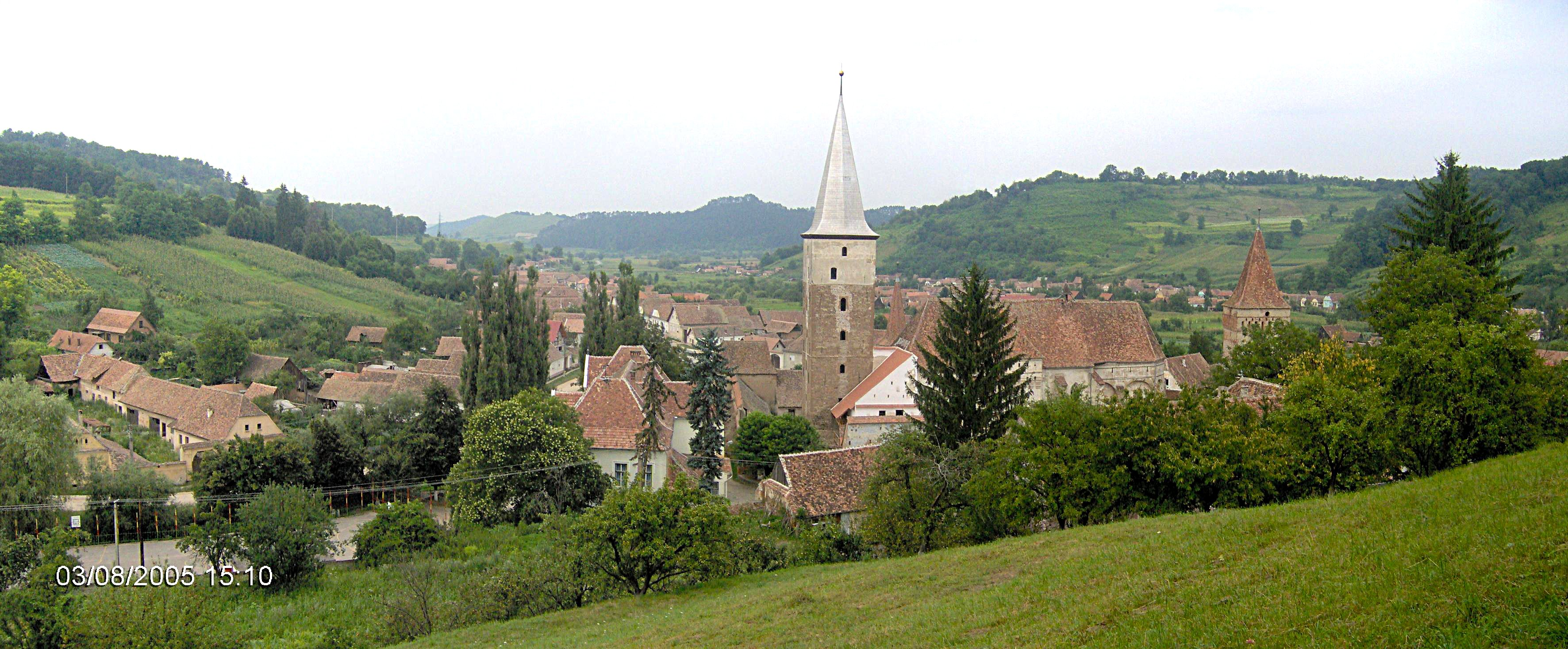
Moșna

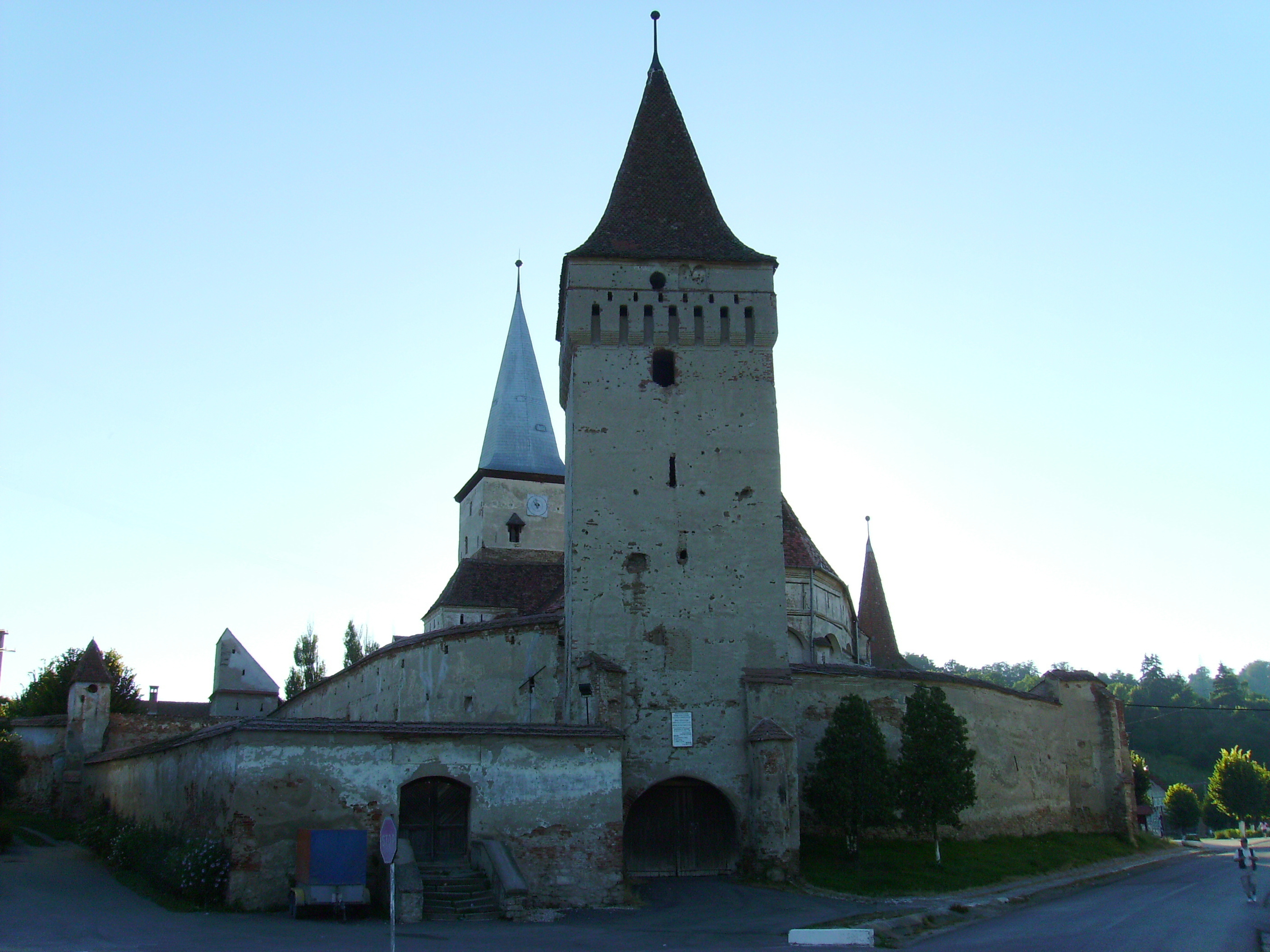
Moșna fortified church

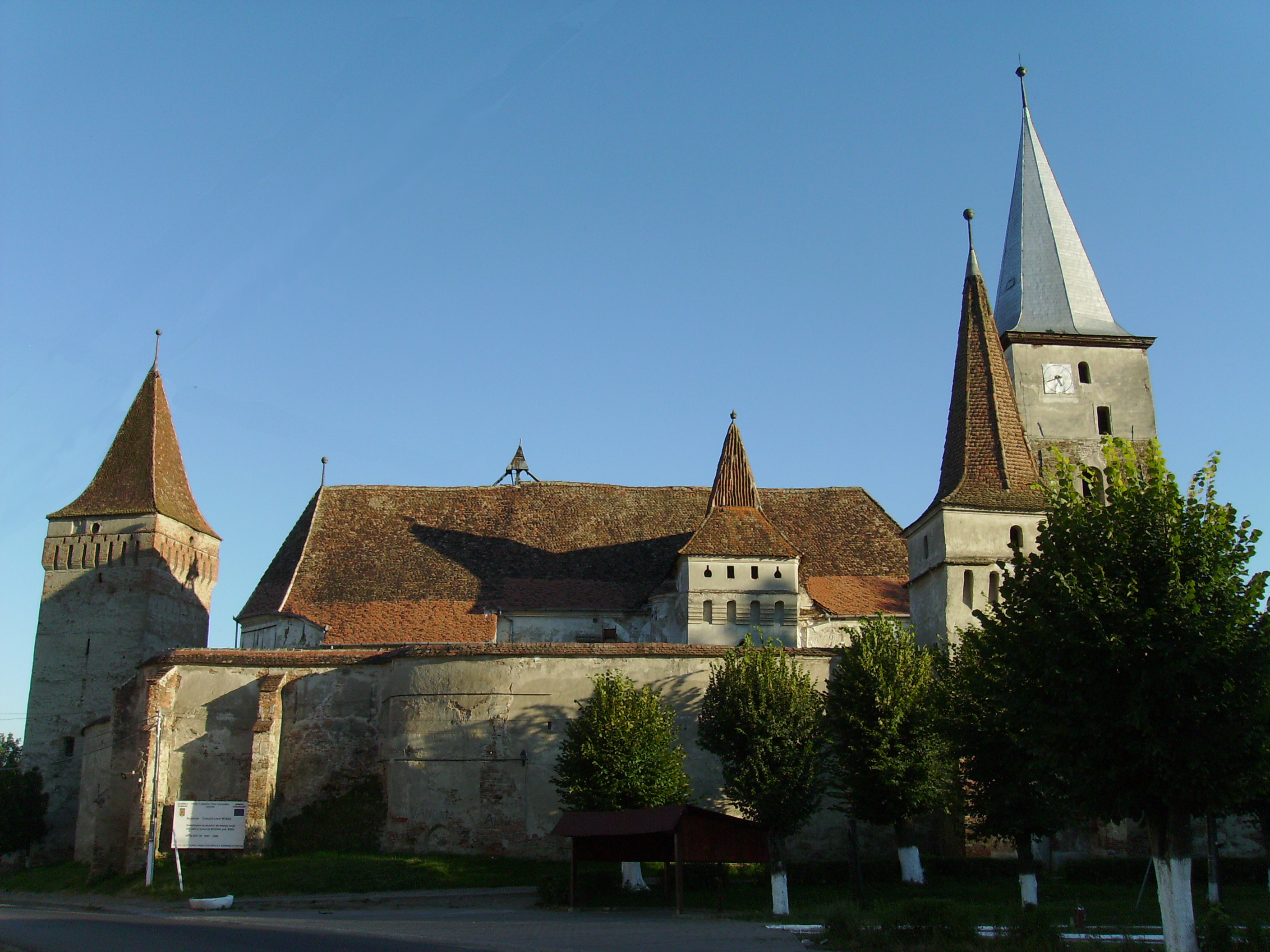
Moșna fortified church

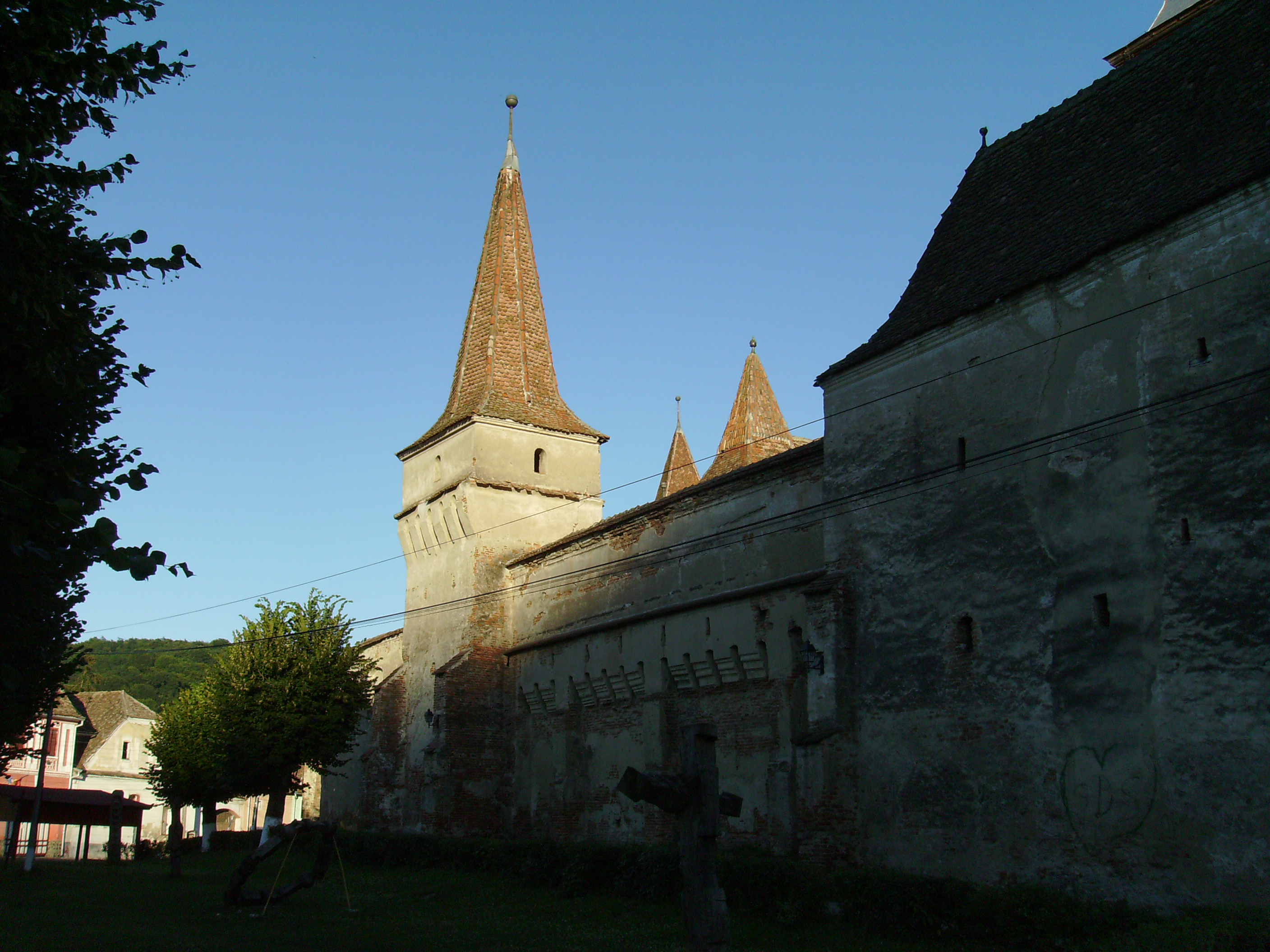
Moșna fortified church

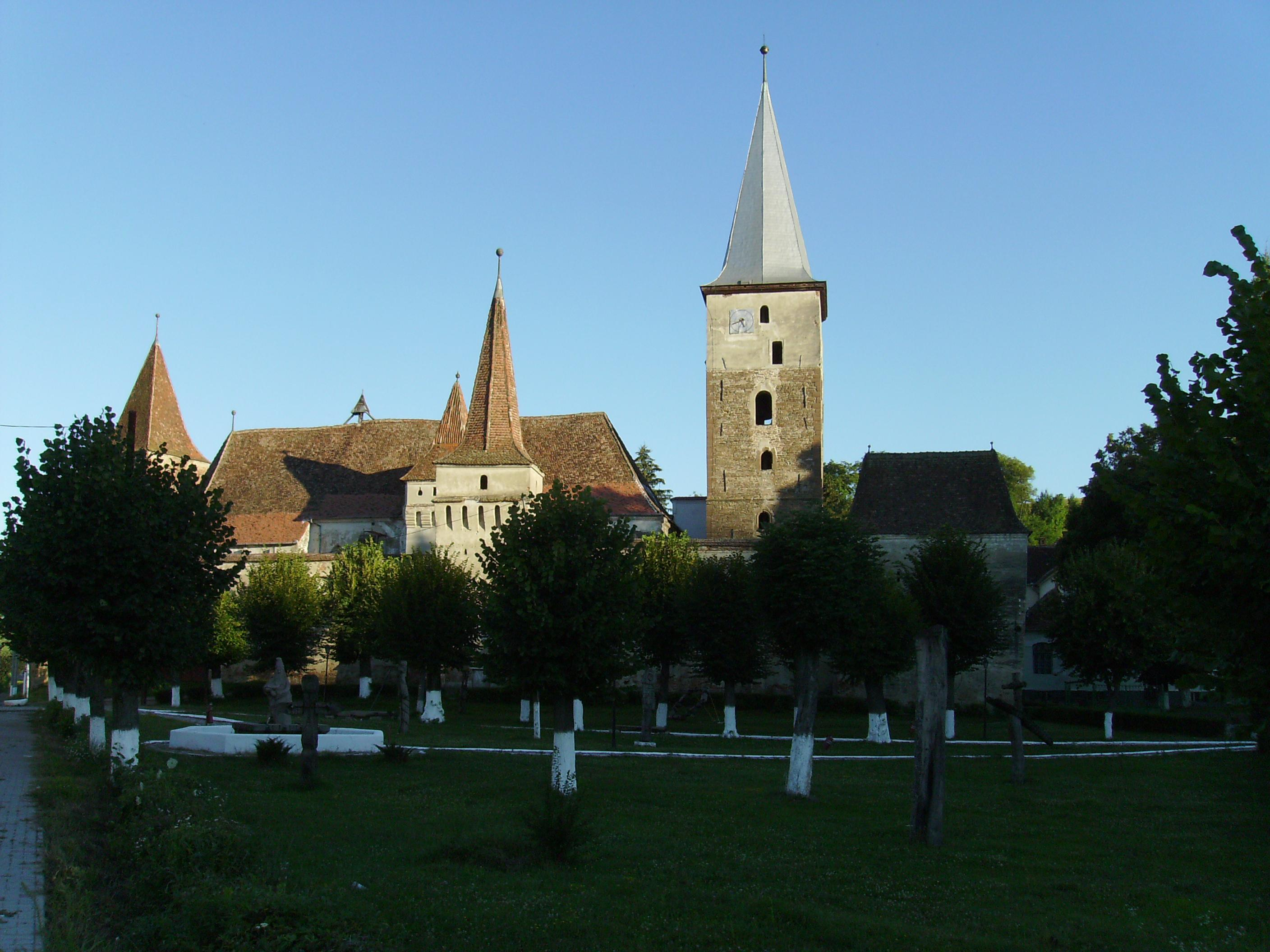
Moșna fortified church
