= Alexandre Abeid =

Brazilian volleyball player (born 1949)

Personal information
- Born: 23 September 1949 (age 75); Rio de Janeiro, Brazil
- Height: 1.94 m (6 ft 4 in)
- Weight: 92 kg (203 lb)

Sport
- Sport: Volleyball

Alexandre Abeid (born 23 September 1949) is a Brazilian volleyball player. He competed in the 1972 and 1976 Summer Olympics.
