= Rainer Zimmermann =

German handball player (1942–2022)

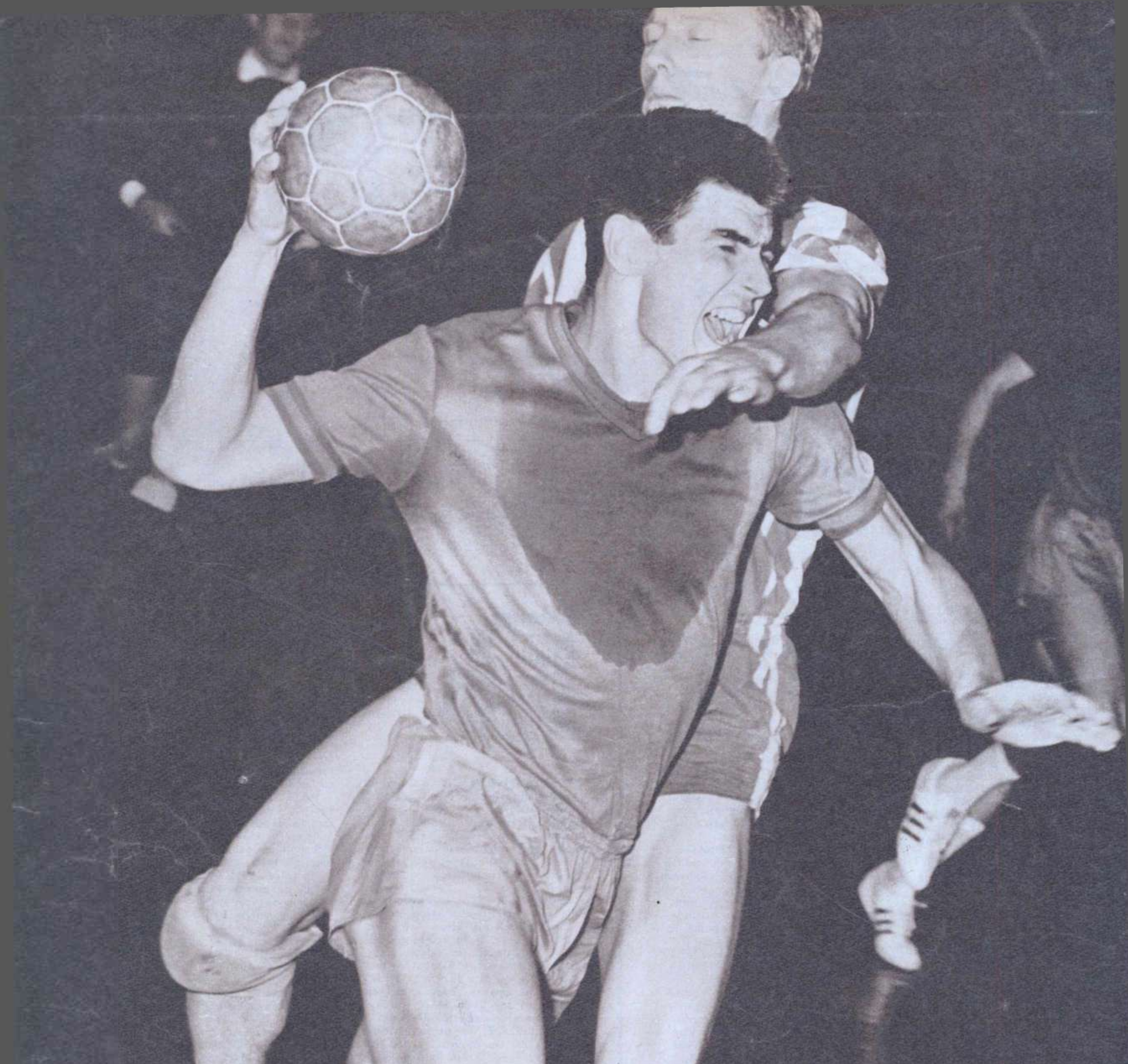
Zimmermann (behind) in a tackle against Mihai Marinescu from Steaua Bukarest (1967/68)

Rainer Zimmermann (2 May 1942 – 25 October 2022) was an East German former handball player who competed in the 1972 Summer Olympics. He was born in Glogau. In 1972 he was part of the East German team which finished fourth in the Olympic tournament. He played three matches and scored eight goals.

At club level he played for SC Dynamo Berlin. In the 1965-66 season he was the top scorer in the DDR Oberliga with 114 goals.
