= Miroslav Štefan =

Czech sport shooter

Personal information
- Born: 17 July 1933 (age 93) Třinec, Czechoslovakia

Sport
- Sport: Sport shooting

Miroslav Štefan (born 17 July 1933) is a Czech former sport shooter. He competed at the 1972 Summer Olympics and the 1976 Summer Olympics.
