= Milan Vápenka =

Czech volleyball player (1943–2013)

Personal information
- Nationality: Czech
- Born: 4 May 1943; Prague, Protectorate of Bohemia and Moravia
- Died: 1 February 2013 (aged 69); Prague, Czech Republic

Sport
- Sport: Volleyball

Milan Vápenka (4 May 1943 – 1 February 2013) was a Czech volleyball player. He competed in the men's tournament at the 1972 Summer Olympics.
