= João Jens =

Brazilian volleyball player (1944–2020)

Personal information
- Born: 3 June 1944; São Paulo, Brazil
- Died: 10 December 2020 (aged 76)

Sport
- Sport: Volleyball

João Jens (3 June 1944 – 10 December 2020) was a Brazilian volleyball player. He competed at the 1968 Summer Olympics and the 1972 Summer Olympics.
