= Werner Lippoldt =

East German sport shooter

Personal information
- Born: 16 February 1944 (age 82) Ostrava, Protectorate of Bohemia and Moravia

Sport
- Sport: Sports shooting
Medal record
Men's shooting
Representing East Germany
Olympic Games
Bronze medal – third place	1972 Munich	50 m rifle 3 positions

Werner Lippoldt (born 16 February 1944) is a German former sport shooter who competed in the 1972 Summer Olympics winning a bronze medal.
