= Michael Buchheim =

German sport shooter (born 1949)

Personal information
- Born: 12 October 1949 (age 76) Schmölln, East Germany

Sport
- Sport: Sports shooting
Medal record
Men's shooting
Representing East Germany
Olympic Games
Bronze medal – third place	1972 Munich	Skeet

Michael Buchheim (born 12 October 1949) is a German former sport shooter who competed in the 1972 Summer Olympics winning a bronze medal.
