= Peter Gorewski =

German sports shooter (born 1944)

Personal information
- Born: 25 February 1944 (age 82) Gliwice, Poland (then Germany)

Sport
- Sport: Sports shooting

Peter Gorewski (born 25 February 1944) is a German former sports shooter. He competed at the 1972 Summer Olympics and the 1976 Summer Olympics for East Germany.
