= Jaroslav Tomáš =

Czech volleyball player (1949–2016)

Personal information
- Nationality: Czech
- Born: 10 February 1949; Kelč, Czechoslovakia
- Died: 5 March 2016 (aged 67)

Sport
- Sport: Volleyball

Jaroslav Tomáš (10 February 1949 – 5 March 2016) was a Czech volleyball player. He competed at the 1972 Summer Olympics and the 1976 Summer Olympics.
