= Horst Peter =

German volleyball player (born 1946)

Personal information
- Nationality: German
- Born: 24 April 1946 (age 80); Leipzig, Soviet occupation zone of Germany
Honours
Men's volleyball
Representing East Germany
Olympic Games
Silver medal – second place	1972 Munich	Team

Horst Peter (born 24 April 1946) is a German former volleyball player who competed for East Germany in the 1968 Summer Olympics and in the 1972 Summer Olympics.

He was born in Leipzig.

In 1968 he was part of the East German team which finished fourth in the Olympic tournament. He played seven matches. Four years later he won the silver medal with the East German team in the 1972 Olympic tournament. He played four matches.
