= Jaroslav Penc =

Czech volleyball player (born 1948)

Personal information
- Nationality: Czech
- Born: 27 May 1948 (age 76); Prague, Czechoslovakia

Sport
- Sport: Volleyball

Jaroslav Penc (born 27 May 1948) is a Czech volleyball player. He competed at the 1972 Summer Olympics and the 1976 Summer Olympics.
