= Jaroslav Stančo =

Czech volleyball player (1949–2011)

Personal information
- Nationality: Czech
- Born: 29 September 1949 Brno, Czechoslovakia
- Died: 5 July 2011 (aged 61)

Sport
- Sport: Volleyball

Jaroslav Stančo (29 September 1949 – 5 July 2011) was a Czech volleyball player. He competed at the 1972 Summer Olympics and the 1976 Summer Olympics.
