= Štefan Pipa =

Slovak volleyball player (1950–2019)

Personal information
- Nationality: Slovak
- Born: 10 January 1950; Bratislava, Czechoslovakia
- Died: 25 September 2019 (aged 69); Bratislava

Sport
- Sport: Volleyball

Štefan Pipa (10 January 1950 – 25 September 2019) was a Slovak volleyball player. He competed at the 1972 Summer Olympics and the 1976 Summer Olympics.
