= Wolfgang Löwe =

East German volleyball player (born 1953)

Personal information
- Full name: Wolfgang Löwe
- Nationality: German
- Born: 14 June 1953 (age 73) Suhl, East Germany
Medal record
Men's volleyball
Representing East Germany
Olympic Games
Silver medal – second place	1972 Munich	Team

Wolfgang Löwe (born 14 June 1953) is a German former volleyball player who competed for East Germany in the 1972 Summer Olympics.

He was born in Suhl.

In 1972 he was part of the East German team which won the silver medal in the Olympic tournament. He played four matches.
