= Rudi Schumann =

German volleyball player (born 1947)

Personal information
- Full name: Rudi Schumann
- Nationality: German
- Born: 15 February 1947 (age 79); Leipzig, Soviet occupation zone of Germany
Honours
Men's volleyball
Representing East Germany
Olympic Games
| Silver medal – second place | 1972 Munich | Team |
World Championship
| Gold medal – first place | 1970 Bulgaria |
FIVB World Cup
| Gold medal – first place | 1969 East Germany |

Rudi Schumann (born 15 February 1947) is a German former volleyball player who competed for East Germany in the 1968 Summer Olympics and in the 1972 Summer Olympics.

He was born in Großdeuben, district Leipzig.

In 1968 he was part of the East German team which finished fourth in the Olympic tournament. He played five matches.

Four years later he won the silver medal with the East German team in the 1972 Olympic tournament. He played all seven matches.
