= Wolfgang Weise =

German volleyball player (born 1949)

Personal information
- Nationality: German
- Born: 12 June 1949 (age 77) Leipzig, Soviet occupation zone of Germany
Honours
Men's volleyball
Representing East Germany
Olympic Games
Silver medal – second place	1972 Munich	Team

Wolfgang Weise (born 12 June 1949) is a German former volleyball player who competed for East Germany in the 1972 Summer Olympics.

He was born in Leipzig.

In 1972 he was part of the East German team which won the silver medal in the Olympic tournament. He played all seven matches.
