= Rainer Tscharke =

German volleyball player (born 1942)

Personal information
- Full name: Rainer Tscharke
- Nationality: German
- Born: 1 August 1942; Babelsberg, Germany
- Died: 20 May 2025 (aged 82)
Honours
Men's volleyball
Representing East Germany
Olympic Games
Silver medal – second place	1972 Munich	Team

Rainer Tscharke (1 August 1942 – 20 May 2025) was a German volleyball player who competed for East Germany in the 1968 Summer Olympics and in the 1972 Summer Olympics. He was born in Babelsberg. In 1968 he was part of the East German team which finished fourth in the Olympic tournament. He played six matches. Four years later he won the silver medal with the East German team in the 1972 Olympic tournament. He played four matches.
