= Arnold Schulz =

German volleyball player (born 1943)

Personal information
- Nationality: German
- Born: 25 January 1943 (age 83); Gębice, Lower Silesian Voivodeship, Poland
Honours
Men's volleyball
Representing East Germany
Olympic Games
Silver medal – second place	1972 Munich	Team

Arnold Schulz (25 January 1943 – 13 July 2024) was a German former volleyball player who competed for East Germany in the 1968 Summer Olympics and in the 1972 Summer Olympics.

He was born in Gębice.

In 1968 he was part of the East German team which finished fourth in the Olympic tournament. He played all nine matches.

Four years later he won the silver medal with the East German team in the 1972 Olympic tournament. He played all seven matches.
