= Siegfried Schneider (volleyball) =

German volleyball player (born 1939)

Personal information
- Nationality: German
- Born: 12 November 1939 (age 86); Forst, Province of Brandenburg, Germany
Honours
Men's volleyball
Representing East Germany
Olympic Games
Silver medal – second place	1972 Munich	Team

Siegfried Schneider (born 12 November 1939) is a German former volleyball player who competed for East Germany in the 1968 Summer Olympics and in the 1972 Summer Olympics.

He was born in Forst.

In 1968 he was part of the East German team which finished fourth in the Olympic tournament. He played all nine matches.

Four years later he won the silver medal with the East German team in the 1972 Olympic tournament. He played all seven matches.
