= Horst Hagen =

German volleyball player (born 1950)

Personal information
- Nationality: German
- Born: 10 January 1950 (age 76); Kuhsdorf, district Prignitz, East Germany
Honours
Men's volleyball
Representing East Germany
Olympic Games
Silver medal – second place	1972 Munich	Team

Horst Hagen (born 10 January 1950) is a German former volleyball player who competed for East Germany in the 1972 Summer Olympics.

He was born in Kuhsdorf, district Prignitz.

In 1972 he was part of the East German team which won the silver medal in the Olympic tournament. He played four matches.
