= Jürgen Maune =

German volleyball player (born 1947)

Personal information
- Nationality: German
- Born: 7 June 1947 (age 79); Meißen, Soviet occupation zone of Germany
Honours
Men's volleyball
Representing East Germany
Olympic Games
Silver medal – second place	1972 Munich	Team

Jürgen Maune (born 7 June 1947) is a German former volleyball player who competed for East Germany in the 1972 Summer Olympics.

He was born in Meißen.

In 1972 he was part of the East German team which won the silver medal in the Olympic tournament. He played five matches.
