= Eckehard Pietzsch =

German volleyball player (born 1939)

Personal information
- Nationality: German
- Born: 14 October 1939 (age 87); Blumberg, Torgau, Nordsachsen, Germany
Medal record
Men's volleyball
Representing East Germany
Olympic Games
Silver medal – second place	1972 Munich	Team

Eckehard Pietzsch (born 14 October 1939) is a German former volleyball player who competed for East Germany in the 1968 Summer Olympics and in the 1972 Summer Olympics.

He was born in Blumberg near Torgau, Nordsachsen.

In 1968, he played eight matches for the East German team, which finished fourth in the Olympic tournament.

Four years later he won the silver medal with the East German team in the 1972 Olympic tournament. He played all seven matches.
