= Wolfgang Webner =

German volleyball player (1937–2020)

Personal information
- Nationality: German
- Born: 23 April 1937 Breslau, Germany
- Died: 1 November 2020 (aged 83)
Honours
Men's volleyball
Representing East Germany
Olympic Games
Silver medal – second place	1972 Munich	Team

Wolfgang Webner (23 April 1937 – 1 November 2020) was a German volleyball player who competed for East Germany in the 1968 Summer Olympics and in the 1972 Summer Olympics. He was born in Breslau. In 1968 he was part of the East German team which finished fourth in the Olympic tournament. He played eight matches. Four years later he won the silver medal with the East German team in the 1972 Olympic tournament. He played all seven matches.

Webner died on 1 November 2020.
