= Wolfgang Maibohm =

German volleyball player (born 1951)

Personal information
- Full name: Wolfgang Maibohm
- Nationality: German
- Born: 11 July 1951 (age 75) Schwaan, East Germany
Honours
Men's volleyball
Representing East Germany
Olympic Games
| Silver medal – second place | 1972 Munich | Team |

Wolfgang Maibohm (born 11 July 1951) is a German former volleyball player who competed for East Germany in the 1972 Summer Olympics.

He was born in Schwaan. In 1972, he was part of the East German team which won the silver medal in the Olympic tournament. He played four matches.
