= Volleyball at the 1972 Summer Olympics – Men's tournament =

Men's volleyball at the Games of the XX Olympiad
- Venue: Volleyballhalle
- Date: 27 August – 9 September
- Competitors: from 12 nations

Medalists
| 1st place, gold medalist(s) | | Japan (1st title) |
| 2nd place, silver medalist(s) | | East Germany |
| 3rd place, bronze medalist(s) | | Soviet Union |

The men's tournament in volleyball at the 1972 Summer Olympics was the 3rd edition of the event at the Summer Olympics, organized by the world's governing body, the FIVB in conjunction with the IOC. It was held in Munich, West Germany from 27 August to 9 September 1972.

== Qualification ==
| Means of qualification | Date | Host | Vacancies | Qualified |
|---|---|---|---|---|
| Host Country | 26 April 1966 | (Italy) Rome | 1 | West Germany |
| 1968 Olympic Games | 13–26 October 1968 | Mexico City | 1 | Soviet Union |
| 1970 World Championship | 20 September – 2 October 1970 | Bulgaria | 3 | East Germany |
| 1970 World Championship | 20 September – 2 October 1970 | Bulgaria | 3 | Bulgaria |
| 1970 World Championship | 20 September – 2 October 1970 | Bulgaria | 3 | Japan |
| 1971 African Championship | 1971 | (United Arab Republic) Cairo | 1 | Tunisia |
| Asian Qualifier | 29–31 July 1972 | (France) Saint-Dié-des-Vosges | 1 | South Korea |
| 1971 European Championship | 23 September – 1 October 1971 | Italy | 1 | Czechoslovakia |
| 1971 NORCECA Championship | 17–22 August 1971 | (Cuba) Havana | 1 | Cuba |
| 1971 South American Championship | 16–25 April 1971 | (Uruguay) Montevideo | 1 | Brazil |
| World Qualifier | 4–10 August 1972 | France | 2 | Poland |
| World Qualifier | 4–10 August 1972 | France | 2 | Romania |
| Total | | | 12 | |

== Pools composition ==
| Pool A | Pool B |
|---|---|
| Soviet Union | West Germany (Hosts) |
| Tunisia | Brazil |
| Czechoslovakia | Romania |
| Poland | Cuba |
| South Korea | East Germany |
| Bulgaria | Japan |

== Venue ==
All matches
Munich, West Germany
Volleyballhalle
Capacity: 3,680
No Image

== Preliminary round ==
=== Pool A ===
| Pos | Team | Pld | W | L | Pts | SW | SL | SR | SPW | SPL | SPR | Qualification |
|---|---|---|---|---|---|---|---|---|---|---|---|---|
| 1 | Soviet Union | 5 | 5 | 0 | 10 | 15 | 3 | 5.000 | 257 | 196 | 1.311 | Semifinals |
| 2 | Bulgaria | 5 | 4 | 1 | 9 | 13 | 8 | 1.625 | 294 | 235 | 1.251 | Semifinals |
| 3 | Czechoslovakia | 5 | 3 | 2 | 8 | 11 | 6 | 1.833 | 230 | 205 | 1.122 | 5th–8th semifinals |
| 4 | South Korea | 5 | 2 | 3 | 7 | 7 | 10 | 0.700 | 209 | 197 | 1.061 | 5th–8th semifinals |
| 5 | Poland | 5 | 1 | 4 | 6 | 8 | 12 | 0.667 | 237 | 259 | 0.915 | 9th place match |
| 6 | Tunisia | 5 | 0 | 5 | 5 | 0 | 15 | 0.000 | 90 | 225 | 0.400 | 11th place match |

| Date | | Score | | Set 1 | Set 2 | Set 3 | Set 4 | Set 5 | Total |
|---|---|---|---|---|---|---|---|---|---|
| 27 Aug | Soviet Union | 3–0 | Tunisia | 15–10 | 15–6 | 15–4 | | | 45–20 |
| 27 Aug | Czechoslovakia | 3–0 | Poland | 15–13 | 16–14 | 15–8 | | | 46–35 |
| 27 Aug | Bulgaria | 3–1 | South Korea | 16–18 | 15–6 | 15–9 | 15–13 | | 61–46 |
| 29 Aug | Poland | 3–0 | Tunisia | 15–6 | 15–11 | 15–1 | | | 45–18 |
| 29 Aug | Soviet Union | 3–0 | South Korea | 17–15 | 15–12 | 15–4 | | | 47–31 |
| 29 Aug | Bulgaria | 3–2 | Czechoslovakia | 15–11 | 15–11 | 12–15 | 14–16 | 15–9 | 71–62 |
| 31 Aug | Czechoslovakia | 3–0 | Tunisia | 15–11 | 15–4 | 15–10 | | | 45–25 |
| 31 Aug | South Korea | 3–1 | Poland | 15–7 | 13–15 | 15–11 | 15–6 | | 58–39 |
| 31 Aug | Soviet Union | 3–1 | Bulgaria | 9–15 | 15–10 | 15–11 | 15–10 | | 54–46 |
| 2 Sep | South Korea | 3–0 | Tunisia | 15–1 | 15–3 | 15–1 | | | 45–5 |
| 2 Sep | Soviet Union | 3–0 | Czechoslovakia | 15–10 | 15–10 | 15–12 | | | 45–32 |
| 2 Sep | Bulgaria | 3–2 | Poland | 14–16 | 12–15 | 15–7 | 15–3 | 15–10 | 71–51 |
| 5 Sep | Bulgaria | 3–0 | Tunisia | 15–10 | 15–5 | 15–7 | | | 45–22 |
| 5 Sep | Czechoslovakia | 3–0 | South Korea | 15–11 | 15–5 | 15–13 | | | 45–29 |
| 5 Sep | Soviet Union | 3–2 | Poland | 11–15 | 15–12 | 15–12 | 10–15 | 15–13 | 66–67 |

=== Pool B ===
| Pos | Team | Pld | W | L | Pts | SW | SL | SR | SPW | SPL | SPR | Qualification |
|---|---|---|---|---|---|---|---|---|---|---|---|---|
| 1 | Japan | 5 | 5 | 0 | 10 | 15 | 0 | MAX | 225 | 95 | 2.368 | Semifinals |
| 2 | East Germany | 5 | 4 | 1 | 9 | 12 | 4 | 3.000 | 200 | 162 | 1.235 | Semifinals |
| 3 | Romania | 5 | 2 | 3 | 7 | 8 | 9 | 0.889 | 201 | 213 | 0.944 | 5th–8th semifinals |
| 4 | Brazil | 5 | 2 | 3 | 7 | 9 | 13 | 0.692 | 273 | 280 | 0.975 | 5th–8th semifinals |
| 5 | Cuba | 5 | 2 | 3 | 7 | 6 | 13 | 0.462 | 212 | 254 | 0.835 | 9th place match |
| 6 | West Germany | 5 | 0 | 5 | 5 | 4 | 15 | 0.267 | 163 | 270 | 0.604 | 11th place match |

| Date | | Score | | Set 1 | Set 2 | Set 3 | Set 4 | Set 5 | Total |
|---|---|---|---|---|---|---|---|---|---|
| 28 Aug | East Germany | 3–0 | Cuba | 15–7 | 15–13 | 15–7 | | | 45–27 |
| 28 Aug | Japan | 3–0 | Romania | 15–4 | 15–5 | 15–6 | | | 45–15 |
| 28 Aug | Brazil | 3–2 | West Germany | 15–7 | 15–8 | 17–19 | 6–15 | 15–9 | 68–58 |
| 30 Aug | East Germany | 3–1 | Brazil | 15–5 | 7–15 | 16–14 | 15–10 | | 53–44 |
| 30 Aug | Japan | 3–0 | Cuba | 15–10 | 15–9 | 15–5 | | | 45–24 |
| 30 Aug | Romania | 3–0 | West Germany | 15–9 | 15–1 | 15–8 | | | 45–18 |
| 1 Sep | Brazil | 3–2 | Romania | 18–16 | 11–15 | 15–7 | 11–15 | 15–12 | 70–65 |
| 1 Sep | Japan | 3–0 | East Germany | 15–4 | 15–2 | 15–6 | | | 45–12 |
| 1 Sep | Cuba | 3–2 | West Germany | 15–8 | 15–11 | 10–15 | 12–15 | 15–8 | 67–57 |
| 3 Sep | East Germany | 3–0 | West Germany | 15–7 | 15–6 | 15–4 | | | 45–17 |
| 3 Sep | Japan | 3–0 | Brazil | 15–7 | 15–13 | 15–11 | | | 45–31 |
| 3 Sep | Romania | 3–0 | Cuba | 15–7 | 17–15 | 15–13 | | | 47–35 |
| 6 Sep | Japan | 3–0 | West Germany | 15–3 | 15–6 | 15–4 | | | 45–13 |
| 6 Sep | Cuba | 3–2 | Brazil | 16–14 | 6–15 | 15–7 | 7–15 | 15–9 | 59–60 |
| 6 Sep | East Germany | 3–0 | Romania | 15–10 | 15–12 | 15–7 | | | 45–29 |

== Final round ==
=== 11th–12th places ===
==== 11th place match ====
| Date | | Score | | Set 1 | Set 2 | Set 3 | Set 4 | Set 5 | Total |
|---|---|---|---|---|---|---|---|---|---|
| 8 Sep | Tunisia | 1–3 | West Germany | 5–15 | 16–14 | 4–15 | 9–15 | | 34–59 |

=== 9th–10th places ===
==== 9th place match ====
| Date | | Score | | Set 1 | Set 2 | Set 3 | Set 4 | Set 5 | Total |
|---|---|---|---|---|---|---|---|---|---|
| 9 Sep | Poland | 3–0 | Cuba | 15–2 | 15–7 | 15–13 | | | 45–22 |

=== 5th–8th places ===
5th–8th semifinals
8 September
Czechoslovakia | 3
Brazil | 0
8 September
South Korea | 0
Romania | 3

5th place match
9 September
Czechoslovakia | 1
Romania | 3
7th place match
9 September
Brazil | 0
South Korea | 3

==== 5th–8th semifinals ====
| Date | | Score | | Set 1 | Set 2 | Set 3 | Set 4 | Set 5 | Total |
|---|---|---|---|---|---|---|---|---|---|
| 8 Sep | South Korea | 0–3 | Romania | 12–15 | 7–15 | 8–15 | | | 27–45 |
| 8 Sep | Czechoslovakia | 3–0 | Brazil | 15–8 | 15–6 | 15–1 | | | 45–15 |

==== 7th place match ====
| Date | | Score | | Set 1 | Set 2 | Set 3 | Set 4 | Set 5 | Total |
|---|---|---|---|---|---|---|---|---|---|
| 9 Sep | Brazil | 0–3 | South Korea | 16–18 | 7–15 | 5–15 | | | 28–48 |

==== 5th place match ====
| Date | | Score | | Set 1 | Set 2 | Set 3 | Set 4 | Set 5 | Total |
|---|---|---|---|---|---|---|---|---|---|
| 9 Sep | Czechoslovakia | 1–3 | Romania | 15–8 | 7–15 | 10–15 | 14–16 | | 46–54 |

=== Final four ===
Semifinals
8 September
Soviet Union | 1
East Germany | 3
8 September
Bulgaria | 2
Japan | 3

Gold medal match
9 September
East Germany | 1
Japan | 3
Bronze medal match
9 September
Soviet Union | 3
Bulgaria | 0

==== Semifinals ====
| Date | | Score | | Set 1 | Set 2 | Set 3 | Set 4 | Set 5 | Total |
|---|---|---|---|---|---|---|---|---|---|
| 8 Sep | Bulgaria | 2–3 | Japan | 15–13 | 15–9 | 9–15 | 9–15 | 12–15 | 60–67 |
| 8 Sep | Soviet Union | 1–3 | East Germany | 6–15 | 8–15 | 15–13 | 9–15 | | 38–58 |

==== Bronze medal match ====
| Date | | Score | | Set 1 | Set 2 | Set 3 | Set 4 | Set 5 | Total |
|---|---|---|---|---|---|---|---|---|---|
| 9 Sep | Soviet Union | 3–0 | Bulgaria | 15–11 | 15–8 | 15–13 | | | 45–32 |

==== Gold medal match ====
| Date | | Score | | Set 1 | Set 2 | Set 3 | Set 4 | Set 5 | Total |
|---|---|---|---|---|---|---|---|---|---|
| 9 Sep | East Germany | 1–3 | Japan | 15–11 | 2–15 | 10–15 | 10–15 | | 37–56 |

== Final standing ==
| Rank | Team |
|---|---|
| 1st place, gold medalist(s) | Japan |
| 2nd place, silver medalist(s) | East Germany |
| 3rd place, bronze medalist(s) | Soviet Union |
| 4 | Bulgaria |
| 5 | Romania |
| 6 | Czechoslovakia |
| 7 | South Korea |
| 8 | Brazil |
| 9 | Poland |
| 10 | Cuba |
| 11 | West Germany |
| 12 | Tunisia |

1972 Men's Olympic champions

Japan
1st title

12–man Roster
Masayuki Minami, Katsutoshi Nekoda, Kenji Kimura, Jungo Morita, Tadayoshi Yokota, Seiji Oko, Tetsuo Satō, Kenji Shimaoka, Yoshihide Fukao, Yūzo Nakamura, Yasuhiro Noguchi, Tetsuo Nishimoto
Head coach
Yasutaka Matsudaira

== Medalists ==
| Gold | Silver | Bronze |
|---|---|---|
| Japan Masayuki Minami; Katsutoshi Nekoda; Kenji Kimura; Jungo Morita; Tadayoshi Yokota; Seiji Oko; Tetsuo Satō; Kenji Shimaoka; Yoshihide Fukao; Yūzo Nakamura; Yasuhiro Noguchi; Tetsuo Nishimoto Head coach: Sasutaka Matsudaira | East Germany Arnold Schulz; Wolfgang Webner; Siegfried Schneider; Wolfgang Weise; Rudi Schumann; Eckehard Pietzsch; Wolfgang Löwe; Wolfgang Maibohm; Rainer Tscharke; Jürgen Maune; Horst Peter; Horst Hagen Head coach: Herbert Jenter | Soviet Union Valeri Kravchenko; Yuriy Poyarkov; Yevhen Lapinsky; Yefim Chulak; Vladimir Putyatov; Vladimir Patkin; Leonid Zayko; Yuri Starunsky; Vladimir Kondra; Vyacheslav Domani; Viktor Borshch; Aleksandr Saprykin Head coach: Yuri Chesnokov |
