= List of University of Nebraska–Lincoln Olympians =

This list of University of Nebraska–Lincoln Olympians shows the athletes and coaches associated with the University of Nebraska–Lincoln who have competed in the modern Olympic Games, plus five who participated in either the 1976 or 1980 Summer Olympics boycotts.

A total of 122 Nebraska athletes have combined to make 179 appearances in the Olympic Games. Nebraska athletes and coaches have won sixty-five medals, including twenty-one gold medals, while representing thirty-one countries. Merlene Ottey is Nebraska's most decorated Olympian in terms of medals won, winning three silver and six bronze across seven Olympic Games, a record for track and field competitors. South African swimmer Penelope Heyns – one of two Cornhuskers with multiple gold medals – is the only woman to ever win the 100- and 200-meter breaststroke events at the same Olympiad.

== Olympians ==
(gold) Gold medal	(silver) Silver medal	(bronze) Bronze medal	Boycotted

=== Summer Games ===
==== Athletes ====
Olympiad	Sport	Athlete	Country	Medal(s)
1912 (V) (Sweden) Stockholm	Sprinting	Lewis Anderson	United States	
1920 (VII) (Belgium) Antwerp	Wrestling	Adrian Brian	United States	
1936 (XI) (Nazi Germany) Berlin	Shot put	Sam Francis	United States	
1956 (XVI) (Australia) Melbourne	Sprinting	Keith Gardner	Jamaica	
1960 (XVII) (Italy) Rome	Sprinting	Keith Gardner	British West Indies	(bronze) 4 × 400 m relay
1960 (XVII) (Italy) Rome	Sprinting	Joe Mullins	Canada	
1960 (XVII) (Italy) Rome	Wrestling	Daniel Brand	United States	
1964 (XVIII) (Japan) Tokyo	Shooting	Gary Anderson	United States	(gold) 300-meter 3-position
1964 (XVIII) (Japan) Tokyo	Sprinting	Lynn Headley	Jamaica	
1964 (XVIII) (Japan) Tokyo	Wrestling	Daniel Brand	United States	(bronze) Freestyle middleweight
1968 (XIX) Mexico City	Discus	Carol Moseke	United States	
1968 (XIX) Mexico City	Shooting	Gary Anderson	United States	(gold) 300-meter 3-position
1968 (XIX) Mexico City	Sprinting	Clifton Forbes	Jamaica	
1968 (XIX) Mexico City	Sprinting	Lynn Headley	Jamaica	
1968 (XIX) Mexico City	Sprinting	Charlie Greene	United States	(gold) 4 × 100 m relay (bronze) 100 m
1972 (XX) (West Germany) Munich	Sprinting	Garth Case	Jamaica	
1972 (XX) (West Germany) Munich	Sprinting	Horace Levy	Jamaica	
1972 (XX) (West Germany) Munich	Sprinting	Leighton Priestley	Jamaica	
1972 (XX) (West Germany) Munich	Sprinting	Don Quarrie	Jamaica	
1976 (XXI) (Canada) Montreal	Sprinting	Leighton Priestley	Jamaica	
1976 (XXI) (Canada) Montreal	Sprinting	Don Quarrie	Jamaica	(gold) 200 m (silver) 100 m
1976 (XXI) (Canada) Montreal	Swimming	John Ebito	Nigeria	
1976 (XXI) (Canada) Montreal	Swimming	Bengt Jönsson	Sweden	
1980 (XXII) (Soviet Union) Moscow	Diving	Reynaldo Castro	Dominican Republic	
1980 (XXII) (Soviet Union) Moscow	Gymnastics	Phil Cahoy	United States	
1980 (XXII) (Soviet Union) Moscow	Gymnastics	Larry Gerard	United States	
1980 (XXII) (Soviet Union) Moscow	Gymnastics	Jim Hartung	United States	
1980 (XXII) (Soviet Union) Moscow	Sprinting	Merlene Ottey	Jamaica	(bronze) 200 m
1980 (XXII) (Soviet Union) Moscow	Sprinting	Don Quarrie	Jamaica	(bronze) 200 m
1980 (XXII) (Soviet Union) Moscow	Swimming	John Ebito	Nigeria	
1984 (XXIII) (United States) Los Angeles	Diving	Reynaldo Castro	Dominican Republic	
1984 (XXIII) (United States) Los Angeles	Gymnastics	Jim Hartung	United States	(gold) All-around (team)
1984 (XXIII) (United States) Los Angeles	Gymnastics	Scott Johnson	United States	(gold) All-around (team)
1984 (XXIII) (United States) Los Angeles	Gymnastics	Jim Mikus	United States	(gold) All-around (team)
1984 (XXIII) (United States) Los Angeles	Long jump	Angela Thacker	United States	
1984 (XXIII) (United States) Los Angeles	Rowing	Lisa Rohde	United States	(silver) Quadruple sculls (team)
1984 (XXIII) (United States) Los Angeles	Sprinting	Janet Burke	Jamaica	
1984 (XXIII) (United States) Los Angeles	Sprinting	Merlene Ottey	Jamaica	(bronze) 100 m (bronze) 200 m
1984 (XXIII) (United States) Los Angeles	Sprinting	Don Quarrie	Jamaica	(silver) 4 x 100 relay
1984 (XXIII) (United States) Los Angeles	Sprinting	Marcia Tate	Jamaica	
1984 (XXIII) (United States) Los Angeles	Sprinting	Dennis Wallace	Jamaica	
1984 (XXIII) (United States) Los Angeles	Sprinting	Bill Trott	Bermuda	
1988 (XXIV) (South Korea) Seoul	Diving	Wendy Lucero	United States	
1988 (XXIV) (South Korea) Seoul	Gymnastics	Kevin Davis	United States	
1988 (XXIV) (South Korea) Seoul	Gymnastics	Scott Johnson	United States	
1988 (XXIV) (South Korea) Seoul	Gymnastics	Tom Schlesinger	United States	
1988 (XXIV) (South Korea) Seoul	Gymnastics	Wes Suter	United States	
1988 (XXIV) (South Korea) Seoul	Javelin	Denise Thiémard	Switzerland	
1988 (XXIV) (South Korea) Seoul	Sprinting	Merlene Ottey	Jamaica	
1988 (XXIV) (South Korea) Seoul	Sprinting	Sharon Powell	Jamaica	
1988 (XXIV) (South Korea) Seoul	Sprinting	Marcia Tate	Jamaica	
1988 (XXIV) (South Korea) Seoul	Sprinting	Bill Trott	Bermuda	
1988 (XXIV) (South Korea) Seoul	Wrestling	Bill Scherr	United States	(bronze) Freestyle 100 kg
1988 (XXIV) (South Korea) Seoul	Wrestling	Jim Scherr	United States	
1992 (XXV) (Spain) Barcelona	Gymnastics	Trent Dimas	United States	(gold) Horizontal bar
1992 (XXV) (Spain) Barcelona	Sprinting	Mark Jackson	Canada	
1992 (XXV) (Spain) Barcelona	Sprinting	Karen Kruger	South Africa	
1992 (XXV) (Spain) Barcelona	Sprinting	Tamás Molnár	Hungary	
1992 (XXV) (Spain) Barcelona	Sprinting	Merlene Ottey	Jamaica	(bronze) 200 m
1992 (XXV) (Spain) Barcelona	Sprinting	Ximena Restrepo	Colombia	(bronze) 400 m
1992 (XXV) (Spain) Barcelona	Swimming	Jan Bidrman	Sweden	
1992 (XXV) (Spain) Barcelona	Swimming	Roberto Bonilla	Guatemala	
1992 (XXV) (Spain) Barcelona	Swimming	Penelope Heyns	South Africa	
1992 (XXV) (Spain) Barcelona	Swimming	Seddon Keyter	South Africa	
1992 (XXV) (Spain) Barcelona	Swimming	Peter Williams	South Africa	
1992 (XXV) (Spain) Barcelona	Swimming	Anja Margetić	Independent	
1992 (XXV) (Spain) Barcelona	Volleyball	Lori Endicott	United States	(bronze) Indoor volleyball (team)
1996 (XXVI) (United States) Atlanta	Distance running	Dieudonné Kwizera	Burundi	
1996 (XXVI) (United States) Atlanta	Distance running	Balázs Tölgyesi	Hungary	
1996 (XXVI) (United States) Atlanta	Heptathlon	Patricia Nadler	Switzerland	
1996 (XXVI) (United States) Atlanta	Softball	Lori Sippel	Canada	
1996 (XXVI) (United States) Atlanta	Sprinting	Frank Mensah	Ghana	
1996 (XXVI) (United States) Atlanta	Sprinting	Merlene Ottey	Jamaica	(silver) 100 m (silver) 200 m (bronze) 4 × 100 m relay
1996 (XXVI) (United States) Atlanta	Sprinting	Linetta Wilson	United States	(gold) 4 × 400 m relay
1996 (XXVI) (United States) Atlanta	Swimming	Therese Alshammar	Sweden	
1996 (XXVI) (United States) Atlanta	Swimming	Juan Benavides	Spain	
1996 (XXVI) (United States) Atlanta	Swimming	Roberto Bonilla	Guatemala	
1996 (XXVI) (United States) Atlanta	Swimming	Penelope Heyns	South Africa	(gold) 100 m breaststroke (gold) 200 m breaststroke
1996 (XXVI) (United States) Atlanta	Swimming	Helene Muller	South Africa	
1996 (XXVI) (United States) Atlanta	Swimming	Julia Russell	South Africa	
1996 (XXVI) (United States) Atlanta	Swimming	José Isaza	Panama	
1996 (XXVI) (United States) Atlanta	Swimming	Emma Johnson	Australia	(bronze) 4 × 200 m freestyle relay
1996 (XXVI) (United States) Atlanta	Swimming	Anna Windsor	Australia	
1996 (XXVI) (United States) Atlanta	Swimming	Valērijs Kalmikovs	Latvia	
1996 (XXVI) (United States) Atlanta	Swimming	Lenka Maňhalová	Czech Republic	
1996 (XXVI) (United States) Atlanta	Swimming	Terrie Miller	Norway	
1996 (XXVI) (United States) Atlanta	Triple jump	Nicola Martial	Guyana	
1996 (XXVI) (United States) Atlanta	Volleyball	Lori Endicott	United States	
2000 (XXVII) (Australia) Sydney	Sprinting	Merlene Ottey	Jamaica	(silver) 4 × 100 m relay (bronze) 100 m
2000 (XXVII) (Australia) Sydney	Sprinting	Jimmy Pino	Colombia	
2000 (XXVII) (Australia) Sydney	Sprinting	Ximena Ristrepo	Colombia	
2000 (XXVII) (Australia) Sydney	Sprinting	Jelena Stanisavljević	(Socialist Federal Republic of Yugoslavia) Yugoslavia	
2000 (XXVII) (Australia) Sydney	Swimming	Therese Alshammar	Sweden	(silver) 50 m freestyle (silver) 100 m freestyle (bronze) 4 × 100 m freestyle relay
2000 (XXVII) (Australia) Sydney	Swimming	Juan Benavides	Spain	
2000 (XXVII) (Australia) Sydney	Swimming	Javier Botello	Spain	
2000 (XXVII) (Australia) Sydney	Swimming	Elvira Fischer	Austria	
2000 (XXVII) (Australia) Sydney	Swimming	Michael Windisch	Austria	
2000 (XXVII) (Australia) Sydney	Swimming	Penelope Heyns	South Africa	(bronze) 100 m breaststroke
2000 (XXVII) (Australia) Sydney	Swimming	Helene Muller	South Africa	
2000 (XXVII) (Australia) Sydney	Swimming	Valērijs Kalmikovs	Latvia	
2000 (XXVII) (Australia) Sydney	Swimming	Adam Pine	Australia	(gold) 4 × 100 m freestyle relay (silver) 4 × 100 m medley relay
2000 (XXVII) (Australia) Sydney	Volleyball	Allison Weston	United States	
2000 (XXVII) (Australia) Sydney	Wrestling	Rulon Gardner	United States	(gold) Greco-Roman 130 kg
2000 (XXVII) (Australia) Sydney	Wrestling	Matt Lindland	United States	(silver) Greco-Roman 76 kg
2004 (XXVIII) (Greece) Athens	Baseball	Adam Stern	Canada	
2004 (XXVIII) (Greece) Athens	Discus	Dace Ruskule	Latvia	
2004 (XXVIII) (Greece) Athens	Gymnastics	Kylie Stone	Canada	
2004 (XXVIII) (Greece) Athens	Hurdles	Nenad Lončar	Serbia and Montenegro	
2004 (XXVIII) (Greece) Athens	Hurdles	Priscilla Lopes	Canada	
2004 (XXVIII) (Greece) Athens	Long jump	Ineta Radēviča	Latvia	
2004 (XXVIII) (Greece) Athens	Softball	Sheena Lawrick	Canada	
2004 (XXVIII) (Greece) Athens	Softball	Stephanie Skegas-Maxwell	Greece	
2004 (XXVIII) (Greece) Athens	Sprinting	Dmitrijs Miļkevičs	Latvia	
2004 (XXVIII) (Greece) Athens	Sprinting	Merlene Ottey	Slovenia	
2004 (XXVIII) (Greece) Athens	Swimming	Therese Alshammar	Sweden	
2004 (XXVIII) (Greece) Athens	Swimming	Adam Pine	Australia	
2004 (XXVIII) (Greece) Athens	Volleyball	Nancy Metcalf	United States	
2004 (XXVIII) (Greece) Athens	Wrestling	Rulon Gardner	United States	(bronze) Greco-Roman 120 kg
2004 (XXVIII) (Greece) Athens	Wrestling	Brad Vering	United States	
2008 (XXIX) (China) Beijing	Baseball	Brian Duensing	United States	(bronze) Baseball (team)
2008 (XXIX) (China) Beijing	Baseball	Adam Stern	Canada	
2008 (XXIX) (China) Beijing	Cycling	Amber Neben	United States	
2008 (XXIX) (China) Beijing	Heptathlon	Györgyi Zsivoczky-Farkas	Hungary	
2008 (XXIX) (China) Beijing	High jump	Dusty Jonas	United States	
2008 (XXIX) (China) Beijing	Hurdles	Priscilla Lopes	Canada	(bronze) 100 m hurdles
2008 (XXIX) (China) Beijing	Long jump	Ineta Radēviča	Latvia	
2008 (XXIX) (China) Beijing	Soccer	Karina LeBlanc	Canada	
2008 (XXIX) (China) Beijing	Soccer	Brittany Timko	Canada	
2008 (XXIX) (China) Beijing	Soccer	Amy Walsh	Canada	
2008 (XXIX) (China) Beijing	Softball	Sheena Lawrick	Canada	
2008 (XXIX) (China) Beijing	Softball	Robin Mackin	Canada	
2008 (XXIX) (China) Beijing	Sprinting	Dmitrijs Miļkevičs	Latvia	
2008 (XXIX) (China) Beijing	Swimming	Therese Alshammar	Sweden	
2008 (XXIX) (China) Beijing	Swimming	Adam Pine	Australia	(silver) 4 × 100 m medley relay
2008 (XXIX) (China) Beijing	Wrestling	Brad Vering	United States	
2012 (XXX) (United Kingdom) London	Basketball	Chelsea Aubry	Canada	
2012 (XXX) (United Kingdom) London	Basketball	Ade Dagunduro	Nigeria	
2012 (XXX) (United Kingdom) London	Basketball	Aleks Marić	Australia	
2012 (XXX) (United Kingdom) London	Cycling	Amber Neben	United States	
2012 (XXX) (United Kingdom) London	Heptathlon	Chantae McMillan	United States	
2012 (XXX) (United Kingdom) London	Heptathlon	Györgyi Zsivoczky-Farkas	Hungary	
2012 (XXX) (United Kingdom) London	Hurdles	Lehann Fourie	South Africa	
2012 (XXX) (United Kingdom) London	Long jump	Ineta Radēviča	Latvia	
2012 (XXX) (United Kingdom) London	Shot put	Carl Myerscough	(United Kingdom) Great Britain	
2012 (XXX) (United Kingdom) London	Soccer	Karina LeBlanc	Canada	(bronze) Soccer (team)
2012 (XXX) (United Kingdom) London	Soccer	Brittany Timko	Canada	(bronze) Soccer (team)
2012 (XXX) (United Kingdom) London	Swimming	Therese Alshammar	Sweden	
2012 (XXX) (United Kingdom) London	Volleyball	Jordan Larson	United States	(silver) Indoor volleyball (team)
2012 (XXX) (United Kingdom) London	Wrestling	Jordan Burroughs	United States	(gold) Freestyle 74 kg
2016 (XXXI) (Brazil) Rio de Janeiro	Basketball	Danielle Page	Serbia	(bronze) Basketball (team)
2016 (XXXI) (Brazil) Rio de Janeiro	Heptathlon	Györgyi Zsivoczky-Farkas	Hungary	
2016 (XXXI) (Brazil) Rio de Janeiro	High jump	Maruša Černjul	Slovenia	
2016 (XXXI) (Brazil) Rio de Janeiro	Hurdles	Miles Ukaoma	Nigeria	
2016 (XXXI) (Brazil) Rio de Janeiro	Swimming	Therese Alshammar	Sweden	
2016 (XXXI) (Brazil) Rio de Janeiro	Volleyball	Kayla Banwarth	United States	(bronze) Indoor volleyball (team)
2016 (XXXI) (Brazil) Rio de Janeiro	Volleyball	Jordan Larson	United States	(bronze) Indoor volleyball (team)
2016 (XXXI) (Brazil) Rio de Janeiro	Volleyball	Kelsey Robinson	United States	(bronze) Indoor volleyball (team)
2016 (XXXI) (Brazil) Rio de Janeiro	Volleyball	Sarah Pavan	Canada	
2016 (XXXI) (Brazil) Rio de Janeiro	Wrestling	Jordan Burroughs	United States	
2020 (XXXII) (Japan) Tokyo	Basketball	Keisei Tominaga	Japan	
2020 (XXXII) (Japan) Tokyo	Cycling	Amber Neben	United States	
2020 (XXXII) (Japan) Tokyo	Hurdles	Máté Koroknai	Hungary	
2020 (XXXII) (Japan) Tokyo	Swimming	Beatriz Padron	Costa Rica	
2020 (XXXII) (Japan) Tokyo	Volleyball	Jordan Larson	United States	(gold) Indoor volleyball (team)
2020 (XXXII) (Japan) Tokyo	Volleyball	Kelsey Robinson	United States	(gold) Indoor volleyball (team)
2020 (XXXII) (Japan) Tokyo	Volleyball	Justine Wong-Orantes	United States	(gold) Indoor volleyball (team)
2020 (XXXII) (Japan) Tokyo	Volleyball	Sarah Pavan	Canada	
2024 (XXXIII) (France) Paris	Basketball	Jack McVeigh	Australia	
2024 (XXXIII) (France) Paris	Basketball	Keisei Tominaga	Japan	
2024 (XXXIII) (France) Paris	Decathlon	Till Steinforth	Germany	
2024 (XXXIII) (France) Paris	Discus	Nicholas Percy	(United Kingdom) Great Britain	
2024 (XXXIII) (France) Paris	Gymnastics	Csenge Bácskay	Hungary	
2024 (XXXIII) (France) Paris	Javelin	Maggie Malone-Hardin	United States	
2024 (XXXIII) (France) Paris	Javelin	Rhema Otabor	(The Bahamas) Bahamas	
2024 (XXXIII) (France) Paris	Shot put	Miné de Klerk	South Africa	
2024 (XXXIII) (France) Paris	Shot put	Axelina Johansson	Sweden	
2024 (XXXIII) (France) Paris	Volleyball	Jordan Larson	United States	(silver) Indoor volleyball (team)
2024 (XXXIII) (France) Paris	Volleyball	Kelsey Robinson	United States	(silver) Indoor volleyball (team)
2024 (XXXIII) (France) Paris	Volleyball	Justine Wong-Orantes	United States	(silver) Indoor volleyball (team)

==== Coaches ====
Olympiad	Sport	Athlete	Country	Medal(s)
1980 (XXII) (Soviet Union) Moscow	Gymnastics	Francis Allen	United States	
1984 (XXIII) (United States) Los Angeles	Gymnastics	Francis Allen	United States	(gold) All-around
1992 (XXV) (Spain) Barcelona	Volleyball	John Cook (asst.)	United States	(bronze) Indoor volleyball
1996 (XXVI) (United States) Atlanta	Gymnastics	Mark Williams (asst.)	United States	
1996 (XXVI) (United States) Atlanta	Swimming	Jan Bidrman	South Africa	
2000 (XXVII) (Australia) Sydney	Gymnastics	Peggy Liddick	Australia	
2000 (XXVII) (Australia) Sydney	Swimming	Jan Bidrman (asst.)	Canada	
2004 (XXVIII) (Greece) Athens	Gymnastics	Peggy Liddick	Australia	
2004 (XXVIII) (Greece) Athens	Swimming	Jan Bidrman (asst.)	Canada	
2008 (XXIX) (China) Beijing	Gymnastics	Peggy Liddick	Australia	
2008 (XXIX) (China) Beijing	Swimming	Jan Bidrman (asst.)	Canada	
2008 (XXIX) (China) Beijing	Softball	Lori Sippel	Canada	
2012 (XXX) (United Kingdom) London	Gymnastics	Peggy Liddick	Australia	
2012 (XXX) (United Kingdom) London	Swimming	Jan Bidrman (asst.)	Canada	
2012 (XXX) (United Kingdom) London	Wrestling	Mark Manning (asst.)	United States	
2016 (XXXI) (Brazil) Rio de Janeiro	Gymnastics	Mark Williams	United States	
2016 (XXXI) (Brazil) Rio de Janeiro	Rifle	Ashley MacAllister	Puerto Rico	
2016 (XXXI) (Brazil) Rio de Janeiro	Wrestling	Mark Manning (asst.)	United States	
2020 (XXXII) (Japan) Tokyo	Volleyball	Tyler Hildebrand	United States	(gold) Beach volleyball
2024 (XXXIII) (France) Paris	Basketball	Tyronn Lue (asst.)	United States	(gold) Basketball

=== Winter Games ===
==== Athletes ====
Olympiad	Sport	Athlete	Country	Medal(s)
2006 (XX) (Italy) Turin	Bobsleigh	Curtis Tomasevicz	United States	
2010 (XXI) (Canada) Vancouver	Bobsleigh	Shelley-Ann Brown	Canada	(silver) Two-woman
2010 (XXI) (Canada) Vancouver	Bobsleigh	Curtis Tomasevicz	United States	(gold) Four-man
2014 (XXII) (Russia) Sochi	Bobsleigh	Curtis Tomasevicz	United States	(silver) Four-man

== Medals ==
=== By athlete or coach ===
Medals by athlete or coach
Athlete	1st place, gold medalist(s)	2nd place, silver medalist(s)	3rd place, bronze medalist(s)	Total
(South Africa) Penelope Heyns	2	0	1	3
(United States) Gary Anderson	2	0	0	2
(Jamaica) Don Quarrie	1	2	1	4
(United States) Jordan Larson	1	2	1	4
(Australia) Adam Pine	1	2	1	4
(United States) Kelsey Robinson	1	1	1	3
(United States) Curtis Tomasevicz	1	1	0	2
(United States) Justine Wong-Orantes	1	1	0	2
(United States) Rulon Gardner	1	0	1	2
(United States) Charlie Greene	1	0	1	2
(United States) Francis Allen	1	0	0	1
(United States) Jordan Burroughs	1	0	0	1
(United States) Trent Dimas	1	0	0	1
(United States) Tyronn Lue	1	0	0	1
(United States) Jim Hartung	1	0	0	1
(United States) Tyler Hildebrand	1	0	0	1
(United States) Scott Johnson	1	0	0	1
(United States) Jim Mikus	1	0	0	1
(United States) Linetta Wilson	1	0	0	1
(Jamaica) (Slovenia) Merlene Ottey	0	3	6	9
(Sweden) Therese Alshammar	0	2	1	3
(Canada) Shelley-Ann Brown	0	1	0	1
(United States) Matt Lindland	0	1	0	1
(United States) Lisa Rohde	0	1	0	1
(United States) Kayla Banwarth	0	0	1	1
(United States) Daniel Brand	0	0	1	1
(United States) John Cook	0	0	1	1
(United States) Brian Duensing	0	0	1	1
(United States) Lori Endicott	0	0	1	1
(Jamaica) (British West Indies) Keith Gardner	0	0	1	1
(Australia) Emma Johnson	0	0	1	1
(Canada) Karina LeBlanc	0	0	1	1
(Canada) Priscilla Lopes	0	0	1	1
(Serbia) Danielle Page	0	0	1	1
(Colombia) Ximena Restrepo	0	0	1	1
(United States) Bill Scherr	0	0	1	1
(Canada) Brittany Timko	0	0	1	1
Total	19	17	27	63

=== By country ===
Medals by country
Country	1st place, gold medalist(s)	2nd place, silver medalist(s)	3rd place, bronze medalist(s)	Total
United States	17	7	10	34
South Africa	2	0	1	3
Jamaica	1	5	7	13
Australia	1	2	2	5
Sweden	0	2	1	3
Canada	0	1	3	4
British West Indies	0	0	1	1
Colombia	0	0	1	1
Serbia	0	0	1	1
Total	21	17	27	65
