= University of Nebraska Athletics Hall of Fame =

- Established: 2015; 11 years ago
- Location: 1200 Vine Street; Lincoln, Nebraska
- Coordinates: 40.8210°N 96.7033°W
- Type: Hall of fame
- Website: Official website

The University of Nebraska Athletics Hall of Fame is a sports hall of fame on the campus of the University of Nebraska–Lincoln in Lincoln, Nebraska. Located just northeast of Memorial Stadium, the hall of fame honors athletes and coaches of the Nebraska Cornhuskers.

There is no set criteria for induction aside from "continuing the tradition of excellence at Nebraska." Since inducting an inaugural class of twenty-two athletes – one representing each of NU's varsity sports – in 2015, the hall has inducted between five and seven athletes and coaches each spring. Inductees are selected by a panel of staff members and former student-athletes.

== Members ==
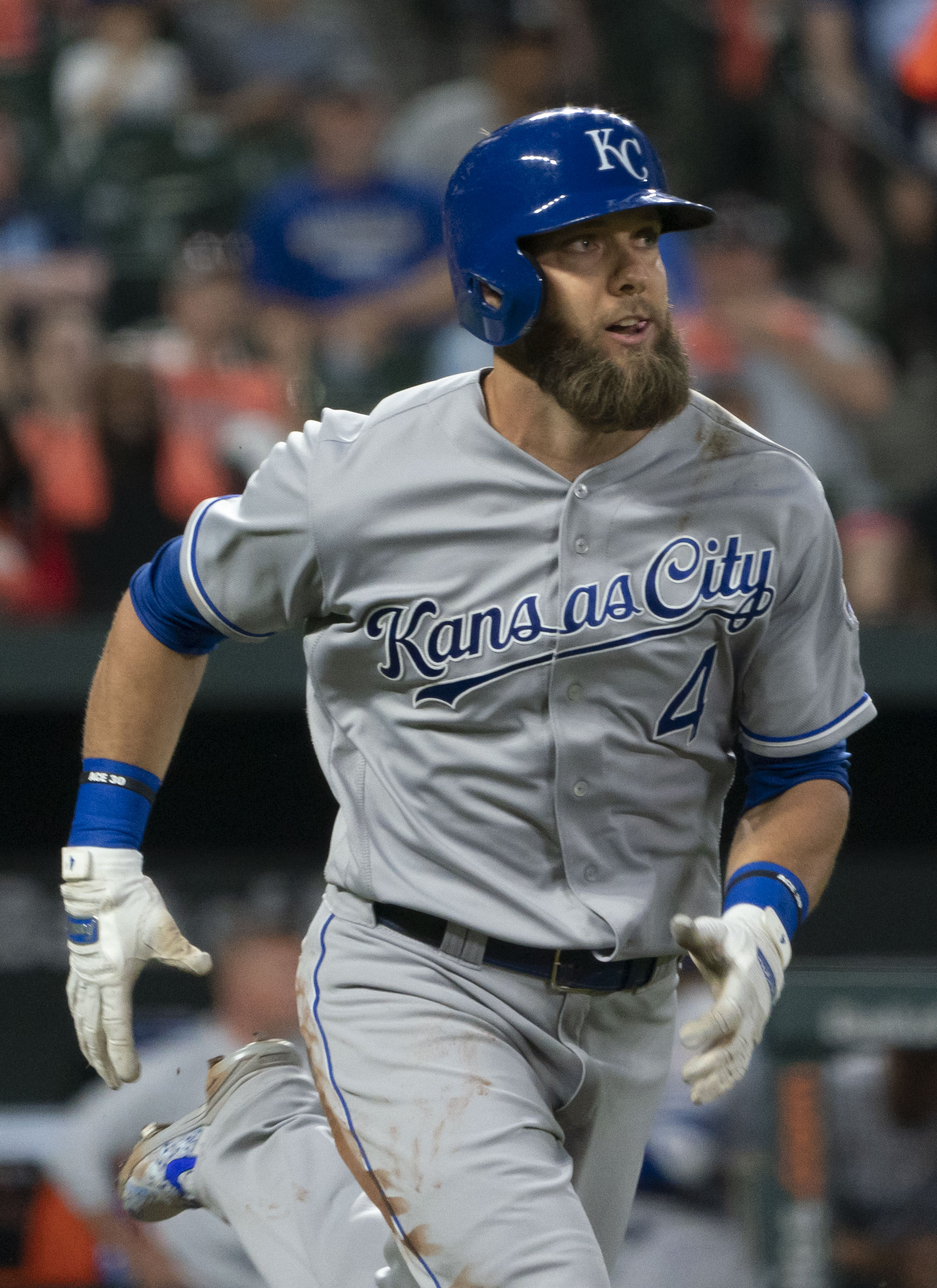
Alex Gordon was inducted in 2015

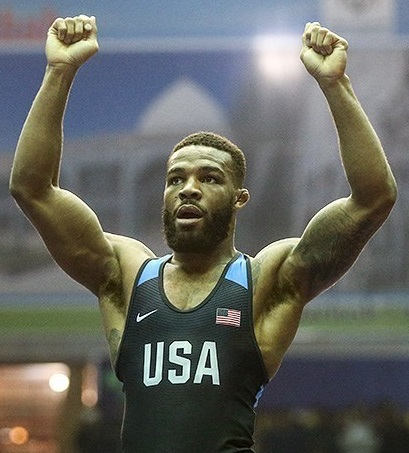
Jordan Burroughs was inducted in 2021

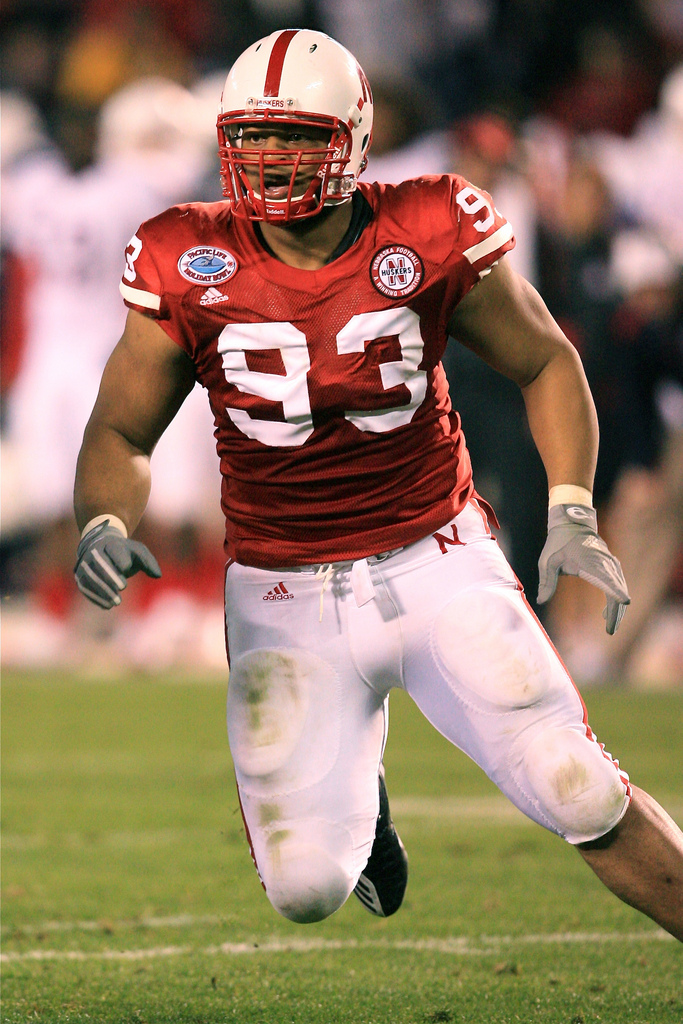
Ndamukong Suh was inducted in 2024

=== Athletes ===
Athlete	Sport	Career (Note: Only includes years in the position for which the individual was primarily inducted into the Nebraska Athletics Hall of Fame. Several also served at the school in a separate capacity.) (Note: Years listed are the years in which the player is credited as a letterman.)	Class
Steve Friesen	Golf (M)	1996–1999	2015
Alex Gordon	Baseball	2003–2005	2015
Charles Greene	Track and field (M)	1965–1967	2015
Jim Hartung	Gymnastics (M)	1979–1982	2015
Penelope Heyns	Swimming and diving (W)	1993–1996	2015
Karen Jennings	Basketball (W)	1990–1993	2015
Steven Jung	Tennis (M)	1986–1989	2015
Joe Kirby	Cross country (M)	1987–1990	2015
Christine Latham	Soccer	1999–2002	2015
Liz Mooney	Tennis (W)	1983–1986	2015
Merlene Ottey	Track and field (W)	1980–1984	2015
Eric Piatkowski	Basketball (M)	1991–1994	2015
Adam Pine	Swimming and diving (M)	1997–2000	2015
Shannon Pluhowsky	Bowling	2001–2002, 2004–2005	2015
Dave Rimington	Football	1979–1982	2015
Sarah Sasse	Golf (W)	1999–2001, 2003	2015
Bill Scherr	Wrestling	1981–1984	2015
Richelle Simpson	Gymnastics (W)	2002–2005	2015
Lori Sippel	Softball	1985–1988	2015
Fran ten Bensel	Cross country (W)	1989–1992	2015
Amanda Trujillo	Rifle	2000–2003	2015
Allison Weston	Volleyball	1992–1995	2015
Heather Brink	Gymnastics (W)	1997–2000	2016
Phil Cahoy	Gymnastics (M)	1980–1983	2016
Janet Kruse	Volleyball	1988–1991	2016
Nicola Martial	Track and field (W)	1993–1996	2016
Nancy Metcalf	Volleyball	1997–1999, 2001	2016
Johnny Rodgers	Football	1970–1972	2016
Will Shields	Football	1989–1992	2016
Bob Brown	Football	1961–1963	2017
Karen Dahlgren	Volleyball	1983–1986	2017
Denise Day	Softball	1982–1985	2017
Rich Glover	Football	1970–1972	2017
Dave Hoppen	Basketball (M)	1983–1986	2017
Scott Johnson	Gymnastics (M)	1980–1983	2017
Darin Erstad	Baseball	1993–1995	2018
Peaches James	Softball	2001–2004	2018
Sarah Pavan	Volleyball	2004–2007	2018
Mike Rozier	Football	1981–1983	2018
Tom Schlesinger	Gymnastics (M)	1985–1988	2018
Rhonda Bladford	Track and field (W)	1982–1985	2019
Greichaly Cepero	Volleyball	1999–2002	2019
Wes Suter	Gymnastics (M)	1983–1986	2019
Ed Weir	Football	1923–1925	2019
Grant Wistrom	Football	1994–1997	2019
Amanda Burgoyne	Bowling	2004–2007	2020
Eric Crouch	Football	1998–2001	2020
Sam Francis	Football	1934–1936	2020
Maurtice Ivy	Basketball (W)	1985–1988	2020
Jordan Larson	Volleyball	2005–2008	2020
Therese Alshammar	Swimming and diving (W)	1998–1999	2021
Jordan Burroughs	Wrestling	2007–2009, 2011	2021
Bob Cerv	Baseball	1947–1950	2021
Kelsey Griffin	Basketball (W)	2006–2008, 2010	2021
Larry Jacobson	Football	1969–1971	2021
Cathy Noth	Volleyball	1981–1984	2021
Guy Chamberlin	Football	1914–1915	2022
Christina Houghtelling	Volleyball	2003–2005, 2007	2022
Patrick Kirksey	Gymnastics (M)	1987–1990	2022
Shane Komine	Baseball	1999–2002	2022
Angela Thacker	Track and field (W)	1983–1986	2022
Ali Viola	Softball	1995–1998	2022
Lori Endicott	Volleyball	1985–1988	2023
Tommie Frazier	Football	1992–1995	2023
Emily Parsons	Gymnastics (W)	2005–2008	2023
Tolly Thompson	Wrestling	1994–1997	2023
Brittany Timko	Soccer	2003–2006	2023
Jordan Hooper	Basketball (W)	2011–2014	2024
Carl Myerscough	Track and field (M)	2000–2004	2024
Virginia Stahr	Volleyball	1986–1989	2024
Ndamukong Suh	Football	2006–2009	2024
Mary Weatherholt	Tennis (W)	2009–2013	2024
Emily Wong	Gymnastics (W)	2011–2014	2024
Kevin Davis	Gymnastics (M)	1985–1988	2025
Diandra Hyman	Bowling	1999–2002	2025
Lisa Reitsma	Volleyball	1994–1997	2025
Stephanie Thater	Volleyball	1989–1992	2025
Aaron Taylor	Football	1994–1997	2025
Matt Hopper	Baseball	2000–2003	2026
Cassandra Leuthold	Bowling	2006–2010	2026
Dean Steinkuhler	Football	1979-1983	2026
Taylor Edwards	Softball	2011–2014	2026
Amber Holmquist	Volleyball	1999-2002	2026
Ineta Radēviča	Track and field (W)	2003–2004	2026

=== Coaches ===
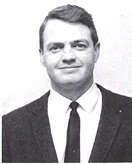
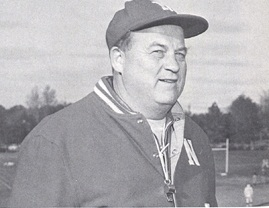
Tom Osborne (left) and Bob Devaney were the first coaches inducted

Coach	Sport	Tenure	Class
Bob Devaney	Football	1962–1972	2018
Tom Osborne	Football	1973–1997	2018
Francis Allen	Gymnastics (M)	1969–2009	2019
Carol Frost	Track and field (W)	1980	2019
Terry Pettit	Volleyball	1977–1999	2020
Bill Straub	Bowling	1990–2019	2022
Gary Pepin	Track and field (M, W)	1981–2022	2023
John Cook	Volleyball	2000-2024	2026

=== Administrators ===
Administrator	Tenure	Class
Louise Pound	1898–1908	2022

== Count by sport ==
Sport	Athletes	Coaches	Total
Football	16	2	18
Volleyball	14	2	16
Gymnastics (M)	7	1	8
Track and field (W)	5	1	6
Baseball	4	0	5
Softball	4	0	5
Bowling	4	1	5
Basketball (W)	4	0	4
Gymnastics (W)	4	0	4
Wrestling	3	0	3
Track and field (M)	2	1	3
Basketball (M)	2	0	2
Soccer	2	0	2
Swimming and diving (W)	2	0	2
Tennis (W)	2	0	2
Cross country (M)	1	0	1
Cross country (W)	1	0	1
Golf (M)	1	0	1
Golf (W)	1	0	1
Rifle	1	0	1
Swimming and diving (M)	1	0	1
Tennis (M)	1	0	1
Administration			1
