= Karen Jennings (disambiguation) =

Karen Jennings (born 1969/1970) is an American former basketball player.

Karen Jennings may also refer to:

- Karen Jennings (author) (born 1982), South African novelist and poet
- Karen Jennings, later Karen Lewis (1953–2021), American educator and labor leader
