= Nebraska Cornhuskers gymnastics =

Nebraska Cornhuskers gymnastics refers to one of the following:

- Nebraska Cornhuskers men's gymnastics
- Nebraska Cornhuskers women's gymnastics
