= Francis Allen (coach) =

American gymnastics coach

- Born: 1942 or 1943 (age 83–84) Cleveland, Ohio, U.S.

Gymnastics career
- Discipline: Men's artistic gymnastics
- College team: Nebraska Cornhuskers (1963–1965)
- Club: Lincoln High School
- Head coach: Jake Geier
- Former coach: Phil Sprague
- Retired: c. 1965

Francis Allen (born 1942 or 1943) is the former gymnastics head coach. He was the head coach of the Nebraska Cornhuskers men's gymnastics team from 1969 to 2009, and is the longest-tenured head coach in the history of Nebraska Cornhuskers athletics. He coached the Cornhuskers to eight NCAA National Championship titles. He was the head coach for two Men's Olympic Gymnastics Teams and coached nine gymnasts who competed in the Olympics.

== Early life and education ==
Allen was born in Cleveland, Ohio, and moved to Lincoln, Nebraska soon thereafter. He began his gymnastics career as a young child when a gymnastics coach in Lincoln found him and some of his friends at a neighborhood pool and started training them. Allen continued gymnastics until high school, where he was coached by Phil Sprague and became state champion for Lincoln High School. After high school, he competed for the Husker's Men's Gymnastics team from 1960–1964, under Jake Geier. He helped the team win Big 8 Championships in 1963 and 1964. He was an all-around finalist from 1962–1964. In 1964 he finished fourth all-around and first on parallel bars.

== Coaching career ==
Right after graduating college, Allen was the assistant coach for the Husker Men's Gymnastics team. In 1969, Bob Devaney offered him the job as head coach and he accepted. Allen coached at Nebraska for 40 years, until 2009. While coaching, his team won eight NCAA Championships. During that time, he was the head coach of the Olympic teams of 1980 and 1992. Nine of his gymnasts—Phil Cahoy, Kevin Davis, Trent Dimas, Larry Gerard, Jim Hartung, Scott Johnson, James Mikus, Tom Schlesinger, and Wes Suter—competed in the Olympics. His gymnasts won a total of 28 United States titles.

In 1979 through 1983, Allen's team won the NCAA Championships. They also took the title in 1988, 1990, and 1994. The Huskers were runners-up seven times. Since 2009, the Huskers have made it to the NCAA tournament 25 out of the last 31 times. Allen has had 172 gymnasts win All-American awards.

In 1984, Allen coached three gymnasts to the Olympic gymnastics team. Jim Hartung and Scott Johnson made the team while James Mikus was an alternate. Allen also coached gymnast Trent Dimas who was a gold medal winner for horizontal bar in 1992.

Allen was the longest-tenured head coach in the history of Nebraska athletics. He has won the second most NCAA titles out of all the men's gymnastics coaches in the NCAA. He was the youngest head gymnastics coach when he was hired and was the oldest head coach when he retired.

== Honors ==
- United States Olympic Men's Gymnastics Team coach in 1980 and 1982
- NCAA Coach of the Year three times: 1979, 1980, and 1981
- National Coach of the Year eight times
- Regional Coach of the Year seven times
- Member of the USA Gymnastics Hall of Fame
- Recipient of the College Gymnastics Association Honor Coach Award
- President of the College Gymnastics Association from 2000–2008
- Coached his Husker team to eight NCAA Championships and seven runner-up finishes
- Nine gymnasts under Allen were Olympians
- Allen's gymnasts won three Nissen Awards, 41 Individual NCAA Championships, 172 All-American Awards, and 15 Academic All-American Awards.
