= Nebraska Cornhuskers beach volleyball =

University of Nebraska–Lincoln beach volleyball team

- Founded: 2013; 13 years ago
- University: University of Nebraska–Lincoln
- Athletic director: Troy Dannen
- Head coach: Jaylen Reyes (5th season)
- Conference: Independent
- Location: Lincoln, Nebraska
- Home arena: Hawks Championship Center
- Nickname: Cornhuskers

The Nebraska Cornhuskers beach volleyball team competes as part of NCAA Division I, representing the University of Nebraska–Lincoln as an independent. The team has been coached by Jaylen Reyes since 2023.

Beach volleyball is one of three varsity sports at Nebraska not affiliated with the Big Ten Conference.

== History ==
The program was established in 2013 as a training and recruiting tool for Nebraska's indoor team, and the rosters typically include the same players. Indoor head coach John Cook led the beach team until turning the program over to assistant Jaylen Reyes in 2023. Reyes served as an assistant on the United States national under-21 team during the 2024 NORCECA Championship.

Nebraska remains one of few beach volleyball programs throughout the Midwest and generally plays the bulk of its season during a spring trip to California and Hawaii, and does not attempt to qualify for the sixteen-team NCAA championship. The university annually hosts matches at the indoor Alloy Strength Complex at the Hawks Championship Center, and held a February 2024 triangular at its campus recreation courts. NU plays an annual series in Lincoln with Wayne State, the only other in-state beach volleyball program.

Prior to the establishment of beach volleyball as an AVCA or NCAA sport, Jordan Larson and Sarah Pavan won the 2007 Collegiate Beach Championship.

== Conference affiliations ==
- Independent (2013–present)

== Coaches ==
=== Coaching history ===
No.	Coach	Tenure	Overall
1	John Cook	2013–2022	54–62 (.466)
2	Jaylen Reyes	2023–present	74–22 (.771)

=== Coaching staff ===
Coach	Position	First year	Alma mater
Jaylen Reyes	Head coach	2023	BYU
Brennan Hagar	Assistant coach	2025	Ottawa
Kelly Hunter	Assistant coach	2020	Nebraska

== Seasons ==
Year	Coach	Overall	Postseason (Note: The AVCA ran the premier beach volleyball tournament until the first NCAA championship was held in 2016. Nebraska does not attempt to qualify for postseason play.)	Final rank
Independent (2013–present)
2013	John Cook	4–5		7
2014	John Cook	3–2		7
2015	John Cook	6–2		
2016	John Cook	5–5		
2017	John Cook	5–7		
2018	John Cook	4–14		
2019	John Cook	12–12		
2020	John Cook	7–3	Canceled (Note: Canceled due to the COVID-19 pandemic.)	
2021	John Cook	Did not compete (Note: Nebraska did not compete in the 2021 beach volleyball season as the indoor season, typically in fall, was moved to spring due to the COVID-19 pandemic.)		
2022	John Cook	8–12		
2023	Jaylen Reyes	15–5		
2024	Jaylen Reyes	16–11		
2025	Jaylen Reyes	22–3		
2026	Jaylen Reyes	21–3		

== Olympians ==
Olympiad	City	Athlete	Country	Finish
2016 (XXXI)	(Brazil) Rio de Janeiro	Sarah Pavan	Canada	Quarterfinal
2020 (XXXII)	(Japan) Tokyo	Tyler Hildebrand (coach)	United States	(gold) Champion (men's)
2020 (XXXII)	(Japan) Tokyo	Sarah Pavan	Canada	Quarterfinal
