= Nebraska Cornhuskers men's tennis =

University of Nebraska–Lincoln men's tennis team

- Founded: 1928; 98 years ago
- University: University of Nebraska–Lincoln
- Athletic director: Troy Dannen
- Head coach: Peter Kobelt (5th season)
- Conference: Big Ten
- Location: Lincoln, Nebraska
- Home Court: Sid and Hazel Dillon Tennis Center (Capacity: 1,400)
- Nickname: Cornhuskers
- Colors: Scarlet and cream

NCAA Tournament appearances
- 2010, 2011, 2025

The Nebraska Cornhuskers men's tennis team competes as part of NCAA Division I, representing the University of Nebraska–Lincoln in the Big Ten Conference. Nebraska has played its home matches at the Sid and Hazel Dillon Tennis Center since 2015.

The program was established in 1928 and has made the NCAA Division I championships three times. Five Cornhuskers have won conference championships and seventeen have been named all-conference selections. In 1989, Steven Jung was the NCAA Singles runner-up and was named NU's first All-American.

The team has been coached by Peter Kobelt since 2023.

== Conference affiliations ==
- Independent (1928)
- MVIAA / Big Eight Conference (1929–1996) (Note: In 1928, the ten member schools of the Missouri Valley Intercollegiate Athletic Association agreed to a splintering of the conference – Iowa State, Kansas, Kansas State, Missouri, Nebraska, and Oklahoma retained the MVIAA name and Drake, Grinnell, Oklahoma A&M (now Oklahoma State), and Washington University formed the Missouri Valley Conference. The MVIAA became commonly known as the Big Six, and later the Big Seven and Big Eight. Its name was officially changed to the Big Eight in 1964.)
- Big 12 Conference (1997–2011)
- Big Ten Conference (2012–present)

== Coaches ==
=== Coaching history ===
No.	Coach	Tenure	Overall	Conference
1	Gregg McBride	1926–1942	38–33–14 (.529)	13–13–2 (.500)
2	Adolph J. Lewandowski	1946	1–6–1 (.188)	1–6 (.143)
3	Harold Rundle	1947	3–6 (.333)	0–6 (.000)
4	Francis Leighton	1948–1949	5–13 (.278)	2–10 (.167)
5	Robert Slezak	1950	2–5 (.286)	0–4 (.000)
6	Ed Higginbotham	1951–1972	119–155 (Note: Results not available from the 1970 season.) (.434)	15–93 (.139)
7	Jim Porter	1973–1981	113–113 (.500)	18–49 (.269)
8	Kerry McDermott	1982–2018	405–448 (.475)	79–183 (.302)
9	Sean Maymi	2018–2022	23–58 (.284)	8–28 (.222)
10	Peter Kobelt	2023–present	57–44 (.564)	21–23 (.477)

=== Coaching staff ===
Name	Position	First year	Alma mater
Peter Kobelt	Head coach	2023	Ohio State
Brett Forman	Assistant coach	2024	Michigan State

== Venues ==
For most of its history, Nebraska's tennis facilities and offices were spread across the city of Lincoln and lacked the amenities of most of NU's conference peers. Playing at indoor and outdoor courts miles apart was challenging when weather forced last-minute venue changes. At the time it joined the Big Ten in 2011, Nebraska was the only school in the conference without an indoor on-campus tennis facility.

Nebraska constructed the Sid and Hazel Dillon Tennis Center, its first standalone tennis complex, in 2015. It was built north of Nebraska Innovation Campus as part of a larger $20.4-million project which also included Barbara Hibner Soccer Stadium. The Dillon Tennis Center has 1,400 permanent seats across six indoor and twelve outdoor courts, each with a DecoTurf hardcourt surface.

== Championships and awards ==
=== NCAA Championship qualifiers ===
Singles

- Steven Jung – 1987, 1988, 1989
- Matthias Mueller – 1990, 1991, 1992
- Karl Falkland – 1993
- Lance Mills – 2002

Doubles

- Jim Carson / Craig Johnson – 1984
- Steven Jung / Stuart Jung – 1989
- Ken Feuer / Matthias Mueller – 1990
- Anthony Kotarac / Matthias Mueller – 1993
- Christopher Aumueller / Benedikt Lindheim – 2012

=== Conference champions ===
Singles

- Matthias Mueller – 1993
- Calvin Mueller – 2023

Doubles

- Ken Feuer / Matthias Mueller – 1990
- Anthony Kotarac / Matthias Mueller – 1993
- Adrian Maizey / Dinko Verzi – 1996
- Dusty Boyer / Toby Boyer – 2015

=== First-team All-Americans ===
- Steven Jung – 1989

== NCAA Division I tournament results ==
Nebraska has appeared in three NCAA Division I tournaments with a record of 0–3.

Year	Seed	Round	Opponent	Result
2010		First round	No. 19 North Carolina	L 4–1
2011		First round	No. 27 Miami (FL)	L 4–3
2025		First round	No. 19 Baylor	L 4–1

== Seasons ==
Year	Coach	Overall	Conference	Conference tournament	Postseason (Note: The first NCAA Division I championships were held in 1963.)	Final rank (Note: The Intercollegiate Tennis Association has published year-end rankings since 1981.)
Independent (1928)
1928	Gregg McBride	3–1				
MVIAA / Big Eight Conference (1929–1996)
1929	Gregg McBride	1–3–1		5th		
1930	Gregg McBride	1–6–2	1–3	4th		
1931	Gregg McBride	1–3–2	1–3–1	4th		
1932	Gregg McBride	1–5	1–4	6th		
1933	Gregg McBride	3–1		4th (2 pts)		
1934	Gregg McBride	4–1		Not held		
1935	Gregg McBride	5–0–1		Not held		
1936	Gregg McBride	1–4–1		4th (2 pts)		
1937	Gregg McBride	3–2–1		5th (1 pt)		
1938	Gregg McBride	3–1–1		2nd (13 pts)		
1939	Gregg McBride	0–2–4		T–2nd (7 pts)		
1940	Gregg McBride	7–0	6–0	2nd (11 pts)		
1941	Gregg McBride	2–3–1	2–2–1	3rd (2–2–1)		
1942	Gregg McBride	3–1	2–1	Not held		
1943	Did not compete (World War II)					
1944	Did not compete (World War II)					
1945	Did not compete (World War II)					
1946	Adolph J. Lewandowski	1–6–1	1–6	4th (2–2–1)		
1947	Harold Rundle	3–6	0–6	Not held		
1948	Francis Leighton	2–7	0–5	Not held		
1949	Francis Leighton	3–6	2–5	4th (5 pts)		
1950	Robert Slezak	2–5	0–4	6th (2 pts)		
1951	Ed Higginbotham	0–6	0–4	7th (1 pt)		
1952	Ed Higginbotham	2–7	2–4	5th (4 pts)		
1953	Ed Higginbotham	2–10	0–6	6th (4 pts)		
1954	Ed Higginbotham	2–13	0–5	7th (1 pt)		
1955	Ed Higginbotham	4–8	0–3	7th (1 pt)		
1956	Ed Higginbotham	4–9	0–4	7th (2 pts)		
1957	Ed Higginbotham	6–4	0–4	7th (2 pts)		
1958	Ed Higginbotham	7–5	2–3	6th (3 pts)		
1959	Ed Higginbotham	8–6	2–4	4th (5 pts)		
1960	Ed Higginbotham	6–10	0–5	8th (0 pts)		
1961	Ed Higginbotham	1–10	0–4	8th (2 pts)		
1962	Ed Higginbotham	7–3	1–2	5th (4 pts)		
1963	Ed Higginbotham	11–5	0–4	T–5th (1 pt)		
1964	Ed Higginbotham	11–5	3–3	T–5th (2 pts)		
1965	Ed Higginbotham	11–5	1–4	T–5th (1 pt)		
1966	Ed Higginbotham	5–9	1–6	7th (2 pts)		
1967	Ed Higginbotham	3–7	0–6	8th (6 pts)		
1968	Ed Higginbotham	5–9	0–7	8th (5 pts)		
1969	Ed Higginbotham	9–8	1–6	5th (4 pts)		
1970	Ed Higginbotham	Results not available				
1971	Ed Higginbotham	7–7	1–5	7th (3 pts)		
1972	Ed Higginbotham	8–10	1–4	8th (15.5 pts)		
1973	Jim Porter	6–10	0–7	8th (6.5 pts)		
1974	Jim Porter	0–18	0–7	8th (7.5 pts)		
1975	Jim Porter	9–10	1–6	7th (13.5 pts)		
1976	Jim Porter	16–15	2–2	6th (10 pts)		
1977	Jim Porter	20–12	2–6	6th (5.5 pts)		
1978	Jim Porter	16–14	3–6	T–8th (18 pts)		
1979	Jim Porter	15–10	3–5	5th (29 pts)		
1980	Jim Porter	19–11	2–5	6th (48 pts)		
1981	Jim Porter	12–13	5–5	6th (45 pts)		
1982	Kerry McDermott	9–11	3–4	5th (65 pts)		
1983	Kerry McDermott	14–6	4–2	3rd (77 pts)		
1984	Kerry McDermott	11–12	2–4	4th (62 pts)		
1985	Kerry McDermott	10–13	4–2	3rd (59 pts)		
1986	Kerry McDermott	14–7	4–2	4th (54 pts)		
1987	Kerry McDermott	15–8	3–3	4th (66 pts)		
1988	Kerry McDermott	14–6	5–1	2nd (84 pts)		
1989	Kerry McDermott	17–7	5–1	2nd (94 pts)		
1990	Kerry McDermott	17–9	4–2	3rd (80 pts)		
1991	Kerry McDermott	10–6	3–3	4th (58 pts)		
1992	Kerry McDermott	9–11	2–4	4th		
1993	Kerry McDermott	14–6	4–2	2nd		
1994	Kerry McDermott	8–16	1–5	5th		
1995	Kerry McDermott	6–15	1–5	Semifinal		
1996	Kerry McDermott	4–16	1–8	Quarterfinal		
Big 12 Conference (1997–2011)
1997	Kerry McDermott	9–15	1–8	First round		
1998	Kerry McDermott	13–12	1–8	First round		
1999	Kerry McDermott	10–11	3–4	Semifinal		58
2000	Kerry McDermott	7–13	0–8	First round		
2001	Kerry McDermott	9–14	3–5	Quarterfinal		
2002	Kerry McDermott	10–12	2–5	Quarterfinal		72
2003	Kerry McDermott	10–11	1–6	Quarterfinal		
2004	Kerry McDermott	9–13	0–7	Quarterfinal		
2005	Kerry McDermott	9–15	0–7	Quarterfinal		75
2006	Kerry McDermott	10–13	0–7	Quarterfinal		62
2007	Kerry McDermott	9–11	2–4	Quarterfinal		56
2008	Kerry McDermott	10–16	0–6	First round		
2009	Kerry McDermott	16–10	0–6	Quarterfinal		
2010	Kerry McDermott	13–13	1–5	Quarterfinal	NCAA Division I first round	41
2011	Kerry McDermott	15–13	1–5	Quarterfinal	NCAA Division I first round	44
Big Ten Conference (2012–present)
2012	Kerry McDermott	11–15	3–7	Quarterfinal		73
2013	Kerry McDermott	10–15	3–8	First round		62
2014	Kerry McDermott	12–15	3–8	First round		
2015	Kerry McDermott	11–14	3–8	Quarterfinal		
2016	Kerry McDermott	14–13	4–7	Quarterfinal		
2017	Kerry McDermott	5–19	1–10	First round		
2018	Kerry McDermott	11–15	1–10	First round		
2019	Sean Maymi	10–17	2–9	First round		
2020	Sean Maymi	2–10	0–1	Canceled (COVID-19)		
2021	Sean Maymi	2–16	1–15	Quarterfinal		
2022	Sean Maymi	9–15	5–3	Quarterfinal		
2023	Peter Kobelt	13–10	5–4	Quarterfinal		52
2024	Peter Kobelt	17–10	5–4	Semifinal		49
2025	Peter Kobelt	15–10	8–5	Quarterfinal	NCAA Division I first round	41
2026	12–14	3–10	Quarterfinal			
