= Nebraska Cornhuskers =

Intercollegiate sports teams of the University of Nebraska–Lincoln

- University: University of Nebraska–Lincoln
- Nickname: Cornhuskers; Big Red
- NCAA: Division I (FBS)
- Conference: Big Ten (primary); Conference USA (bowling); Patriot Rifle (rifle)
- Athletic director: Troy Dannen
- Location: Lincoln, Nebraska
- Varsity teams: 24 (10 men's, 14 women's)
- Football stadium: Memorial Stadium
- Basketball arena: Pinnacle Bank Arena
- Baseball stadium: Hawks Field
- Softball stadium: Bowlin Stadium
- Soccer stadium: Hibner Stadium
- Aquatics center: Devaney Center Natatorium
- Golf course: Wilderness Ridge Golf Club
- Tennis venue: Dillon Tennis Center
- Volleyball arena: John Cook Arena
- Wrestling arena: Devaney Center
- Colors: Scarlet and cream
- Mascot: Herbie Husker; Lil' Red
- Fight song: Hail Varsity; Dear Old Nebraska U
- Website: huskers.com

Big Ten logo in Nebraska's school colors

The Nebraska Cornhuskers (often abbreviated to Huskers) are the intercollegiate athletic teams that represent the University of Nebraska–Lincoln. The university is a member of the Big Ten Conference and competes in NCAA Division I, fielding twenty-four varsity teams (ten men's, fourteen women's) in sixteen sports. Twenty-one of these teams participate in the Big Ten, while beach volleyball, bowling, and rifle compete as independents or affiliate members of other conferences. The Cornhuskers are commonly referred to as the "Big Red" and have two official mascots, Herbie Husker and Lil' Red.

Nebraska was a founding member of the short-lived Western Interstate University Football Association, one of college football's first conferences, in 1892, and helped form the Missouri Valley Intercollegiate Athletic Association fifteen years later. The MVIAA, which became the Big Eight in 1964, served as Nebraska's primary conference for the next eighty-nine years, with a brief hiatus during World War I. In 1996, the Big Eight merged with four Texas schools from the Southwest Conference to form the Big 12. Nebraska joined the Big Ten in 2011, a lucrative transition that separated the school from most of its traditional rivals.

Nebraska's varsity athletic programs have won thirty-two national championships (eleven in bowling, eight in men's gymnastics, five each in football and volleyball, and three in women's track and field) and 359 combined conference regular-season and tournament championships.

== Nickname ==
The University of Nebraska did not have a nickname or mascot during its early decades, though many were used unofficially. NU's first football team wore gold and black and became known as the "Old Gold Knights," but it is unclear if the term was used contemporarily. In 1892, The Hesperian Student (later The Daily Nebraskan) urged the adoption of new colors due to the number of universities – specifically WIUFA rivals Iowa and Missouri – already using gold or yellow, and selected scarlet and cream as they were considered "bright and attractive." Throughout the 1890s the team may have gone by "Antelopes" and "Rattlesnake Boys," but the most well-known of Nebraska's early nicknames is "Bugeaters," a reference to the state's meager food supply during an 1870s drought when farmers purportedly ate bugs to survive. Many Nebraskans appreciated the rugged characterization despite its negative connotations.

The first documented use of "Cornhuskers" appeared in the March 17, 1894 issue of The Sporting News, in reference to a Western League baseball team from Sioux City that later became the Chicago White Sox. Six months later, the term appeared in The Hesperian Student ("We have met the corn huskers and they are ours!") as a derisive reference to Iowa. Nebraska State Journal (later the Lincoln Journal Star) sportswriter and state native Cy Sherman hated the Bugeaters moniker and began using "Cornhuskers" to refer to Nebraska in 1899. It caught on quickly and was adopted by the university in 1900, and later by the state of Nebraska itself, which became "The Cornhusker State" in 1946. Sherman is known as "the father of the Cornhuskers" and later founded college football's AP poll.

== Varsity sports ==
Men's sports	Women's sports
Baseball	Basketball
Basketball	Beach volleyball
Cross country	Bowling
Football	Cross country
Golf	Flag football (2028)
Gymnastics	Golf
Tennis	Gymnastics
Track and field (Note: Track and field includes both indoor and outdoor, which are considered separate programs.)	Soccer
Wrestling	Softball
	Swimming and diving
Tennis
Track and field
Volleyball
**Co-ed sports**
Rifle (Note: Though rifle is classified as coeducational by the NCAA, Nebraska fields an all-female team.)

=== Baseball ===
Nebraska established a baseball program in 1889, making it the school's oldest active varsity sport. The team was disjointed in its first decades, often disbanding for years at a time. The hiring of Tony Sharpe in 1947 brought stability but limited success – Sharpe and his successor John Sanders combined to lead fifty-one seasons, making just three postseason appearances. Dave Van Horn was hired in 1998 and established a national power, culminating in Nebraska's first College World Series appearances in 2001 and 2002, a landmark moment for a state that has hosted the event since 1950. Assistant Mike Anderson took over for Van Horn and led NU to its best-ever season, finishing 57–15 and reaching another College World Series in 2005. Anderson did not sustain this success and was fired in 2011, the same year Nebraska transitioned to the Big Ten. NU has experienced little national success since joining the conference.

Nebraska has been to eighteen NCAA Division I tournaments and three College World Series. Sixteen players have been named first-team All-Americans and Alex Gordon won the 2005 Golden Spikes Award as the country's best amateur player. Nebraska plays its home games at Hawks Field at Haymarket Park, built in 2001 to replace the aging Buck Beltzer Stadium.

- Conference championships (8): 1929, 1948, 1950, 2001, 2003, 2005, 2017, 2021
- Conference tournament championships (6): 1999, 2000, 2001, 2005, 2024, 2025
- College World Series appearances (3): 2001, 2002, 2005

=== Basketball ===
Men

Prior to the creation of the NCAA tournament, Nebraska was a Midwest power under head coaches Raymond G. Clapp and Ewald O. Stiehm. NU struggled through the post-World War II years, which included a stretch of twenty-eight years with just two winning seasons that stretched into the 1960s. Much of the team's modest modern-day success came during the fourteen-year tenure of Danny Nee, Nebraska's winningest head coach. Nee led the Cornhuskers to five of their nine NCAA Division I tournament appearances and won the 1996 National Invitation Tournament, NU's first national postseason title. In 2019, NU hired former Chicago Bulls head coach Fred Hoiberg, who led the Cornhuskers to the program's first NCAA tournament victories in 2026.

Nebraska's men's and women's basketball teams have played at West Haymarket Arena (known as Pinnacle Bank Arena for sponsorship purposes) since its construction in 2013.

- Conference championships (6): 1912, 1913, 1914, 1916, 1949, 1950
- Conference tournament championships (1): 1994

Women

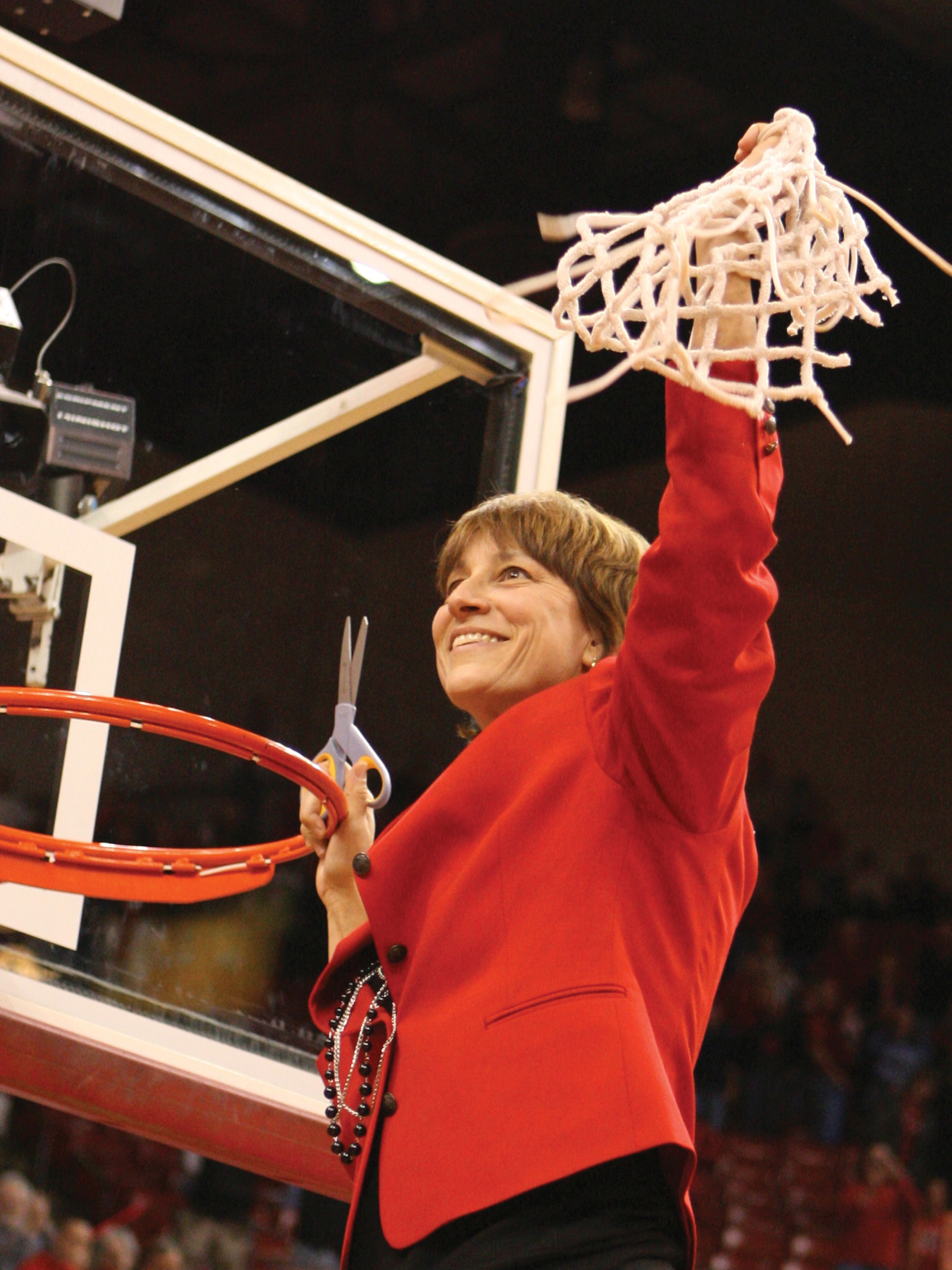
Connie Yori is Nebraska's all-time winningest women's basketball coach

Nebraska's women's basketball history began with a short-lived club team in the early 1900; the program was shuttered until the 1972 enactment of Title IX. Angela Beck took Nebraska to its first NCAA Division I tournament and won the 1988 Big Eight championship. Under Beck, Karen Jennings won the Wade Trophy as the country's best player in 1992–93.

Connie Yori, hired from Creighton in 2002, steadily built a national contender, culminating in a 2009–10 season that was the best in school history – NU started 30–0 and became the first Big 12 team to complete an undefeated regular season. Kelsey Griffin was a national player of the year finalist and Yori was named national coach of the year. Forward Jordan Hooper led Nebraska into the Big Ten and earned first-team All-America honors in 2013–14, the same season NU won its first conference tournament. Yori was forced to resign after an administrative investigation in 2016, and Nebraska turned to former player Amy Williams to lead the program.

- Conference championships (2): 1988, 2010
- Conference tournament championships (1): 2014

=== Bowling ===
Nebraska's bowling program was founded as a club team in 1983 and became a varsity sport in 1997. It is the most successful collegiate program in bowling history, winning eleven national championships and qualifying for every NCAA championship. Most of this success came under Bill Straub, who coached for thirty-six years and granted the first full scholarships in bowling history. The team has been coached by longtime assistant Paul Klempa since Straub's retirement in 2019.

Bowling competes in Conference USA, making it one of three programs at Nebraska not affiliated with the Big Ten.

- **WIBC** (5) / **NCAA** (6) championships: 1991, 1995, 1997, 1999, 2001, 2004, 2005, 2009, 2013, 2015, 2021

=== Cross country ===
Nebraska's men's cross country team was established in 1938, winning its only conference championship two years later. The women's program was established in 1975. Megan Elliott has coached both teams since 2024.

- Men's conference championships (1): 1940
- Women's conference championships (5): 1985, 1988, 1989, 1991, 1993

=== Flag football ===
In 2026, Nebraska became the first power conference school to sponsor women's flag football, a limited-contact form of American football that is part of the NCAA Emerging Sports for Women program. It will be the school's twenty-seventh varsity sport when it begins competition in spring 2027.

NU hired Liz Sowers to serve as the program's head coach, with her twin sister Katie as an assistant; the pair led Ottawa University to five consecutive NAIA women's flag football national championship titles.

=== Football ===
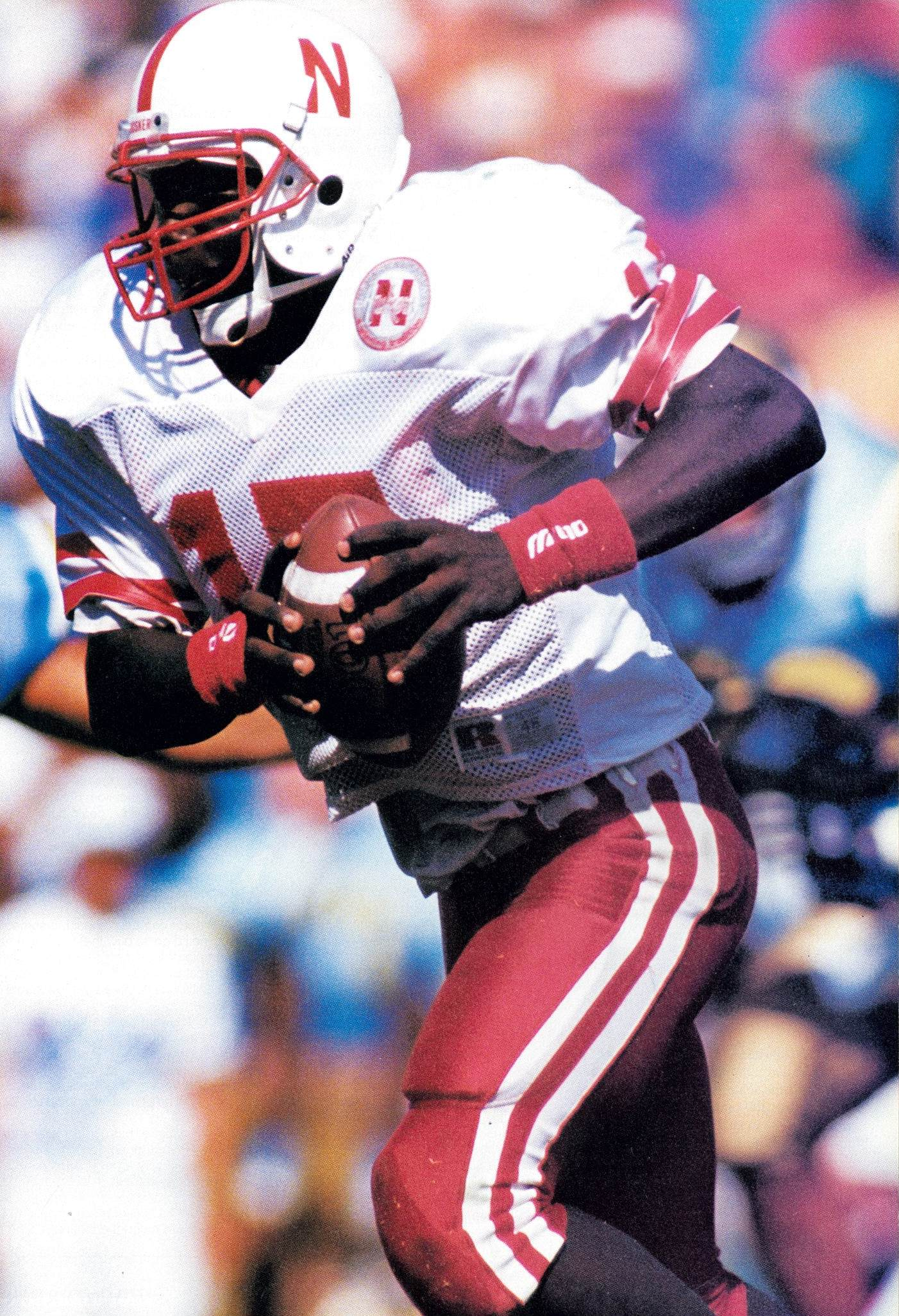
Quarterback Tommie Frazier was named most valuable player of three national championship games

Nebraska is among the most storied programs in college football history, winning forty-six conference championships and five national championships, along with seven unclaimed national titles. Its 1971 and 1995 teams are considered among the best ever. Heisman Trophy winners Johnny Rodgers, Mike Rozier, and Eric Crouch join twenty-four other Cornhuskers in the College Football Hall of Fame. Nebraska has played its home games at Memorial Stadium since 1923 and sold out every game at the venue since 1962.

The program's first extended period of success came early in the twentieth century. Between 1900 and 1916, Nebraska had five undefeated seasons and a stretch of thirty-four games without a loss. The Cornhuskers won twenty-four conference championships prior to World War II but struggled through the postwar years until Bob Devaney was hired in 1962. Devaney built Nebraska into a national power, winning two national championships and eight conference titles in eleven seasons as head coach. Offensive coordinator Tom Osborne was named Devaney's successor in 1973 and over the next twenty-five years established himself as one of the best coaches in college football history with his trademark I formation offense and revolutionary strength, conditioning, and nutrition programs. Following Osborne's retirement in 1997, Nebraska cycled through five head coaches before hiring Matt Rhule in 2023.

- Conference championships (46): 1894, 1895, 1897, 1907, 1910, 1911, 1912, 1913, 1914, 1915, 1916, 1917, 1921, 1922, 1923, 1928, 1929, 1931, 1932, 1933, 1935, 1936, 1937, 1940, 1963, 1964, 1965, 1966, 1969, 1970, 1971, 1972, (Note: In early 1973, Oklahoma forfeited eight wins from the previous season when it was discovered the Sooners had used players ineligible under NCAA rules, which gave second-place Nebraska the 1972 Big Eight title. Decades later, Oklahoma reversed course and recognized these wins. Both schools claim the championship.) 1975, 1978, 1981, 1982, 1983, 1984, 1988, 1991, 1992, 1993, 1994, 1995, 1997, 1999
- **National championships** (claimed in bold) (12): 1915, **1970**, **1971**, 1980, 1981, 1982, 1983, 1984, 1993, **1994**, **1995**, **1997**

=== Golf ===
Nebraska's men's golf program was established in 1935 and has reached the NCAA Division I championship four times, most recently in 1999. Steve Friesen won the 1999 Ben Hogan Award as the country's best golfer under the guidance of longtime head coach Larry Romjue. The team has been coached by Judd Cornell since 2023.

A women's program was started 1975, initially led by Romjue. The Cornhuskers have played in fourteen NCAA regionals, advancing to the NCAA Division I championship three times. Kate Smith represented the program in the 2021 Arnold Palmer Cup. The university does not own or operate a golf course, and both teams use courses around Lincoln to practice and host tournaments.

- Men's conference championships (2): 1936, 1937
- Women's conference championships (2): 1976, 1983

=== Gymnastics ===
Men

Since being established in 1939, Nebraska's men's gymnastics program has won eight national championships and forty-two NCAA event titles. The bulk of this success came under head coach Francis Allen, a former All-American who led the program for forty seasons. Twelve Cornhuskers have participated in the Olympic Games and combined to win four gold medals. The team has been coached by Chuck Chmelka since 2010.

NU is one of just twelve Division I universities that sponsors a men's gymnastics program.

- All-around national champions (9): Jim Hartung (1980, 1981), Wes Suter (1985), Tom Schlesinger (1987), Kevin Davis (1988), Patrick Kirksey (1989), Dennis Harrison (1994), Richard Grace (1995), Jason Hardabura (1999)
- Conference championships (15): 1964, 1976, 1980, 1982, 1983, 1985, 1986, 1988, 1989, 1990, 1992, 1993, 1994, 1997, 1999
- **NCAA championships** (8): 1979, 1980, 1981, 1982, 1983, 1988, 1990, 1994

Women

Nebraska's women's gymnastics program has won twenty-five conference championships and qualified for the NCAA tournament twenty-nine times. Most of the program's success came under head coach Dan Kendig, who led NU for twenty-five years and made twelve Super Six appearances. Michelle Bryant, Heather Brink, and Richelle Simpson combined to win five individual NCAA championships and are among NU's eighty-three All-Americans. The team has been coached by Heather Brink since Kendig's retirement in 2019.

- All-around national champions (2): Heather Brink (2000), Richelle Simpson (2003)
- Conference championships (Note: The Big Eight and Big 12 did not award a regular-season women's gymnastics championship.) (2): 2014, 2017
- Conference tournament championships (23): 1978, 1979, 1980, 1982, 1983, 1987, 1988, 1989, 1990, 1994, 1995, 1996, 1997, 1998, 1999, 2001, 2002, 2003, 2005, 2007, 2011, 2012, 2013

=== Rifle ===
Rifle competes in the Patriot Rifle Conference, making it the only program at Nebraska in a conference other than the Big Ten. NU has reached twenty NCAA championships and produced four individual national champions. The team has been coached by Richard Clark since 2024.

The team trains at an indoor firing range in the John J. Pershing Military and Naval Science Building. Although the NCAA classifies rifle as coeducational, Nebraska has fielded an all-female team since its establishment in 1998 and is one of twenty-nine NCAA rifle programs.

- National champions: Nicole Allaire (2000 – SB), Kristina Fehlings – (2006 – AR), Rachel Martin – (2015 – SB), Cecelia Ossi – (2023 – SB)
- Conference championships (1): 2006
- Conference tournament championships (2): 2005, 2006

=== Soccer ===
Nebraska has been coached by John Walker since it became the first Big Eight school to sponsor women's soccer in 1994. Nebraska finished 23–1–0 and reached the national quarterfinal in 1996, the beginning of a five-year stretch in which NU achieved most of its national success. The program has reached in thirteen NCAA Division I tournaments and won a combined eleven conference championships across the Big 12 and Big Ten. Eleven former Cornhuskers have competed in the FIFA Women's World Cup, most of them for Walker's native Canada.

Nebraska has played its home games at Barbara Hibner Soccer Stadium since 2015.

- Conference championships (5): 1996, 1999, 2000, 2013, 2023
- Conference tournament championships (7): 1996, 1998, 1999, 2000, 2002, 2013

=== Softball ===
Nebraska's softball program was sanctioned as a varsity sport in 1977 and reached the inaugural Women's College World Series five years later. Though the team was often surrounded by controversy, NU was highly successful through the 1980s, advancing to the WCWS four more times and finishing national runner-up in 1985 under head coach Wayne Daigle.

Rhonda Revelle was hired in 1993 and turned Nebraska into a postseason regular and fixture in the national top twenty-five. In 1998, Nebraska completed the first undefeated season in Big 12 history and returned to the Women's College World Series – Revelle became the third person to reach the WCWS as a player and a head coach, and the first to do it at the same school. NU reached a third WCWS under Revelle in 2013, the same year she won her 768th game to pass former baseball coach John Sanders for the most victories by any coach at the university.

Nebraska has played at Bowlin Stadium, part of the Haymarket Park complex, since 2002.

- Conference championships (11): 1982, 1984, 1985, 1986, 1987, 1988, 1998, 2001, 2004, 2014, 2026
- Conference tournament championships (10): 1982, 1984, 1985, 1986, 1987, 1988, 1998, 2000, 2004, 2026
- Women's College World Series appearances (9): 1982, 1984, 1985, (Note: Nebraska's 1985 Women's College World Series runner-up finish was vacated by the NCAA in 1986.) 1987, 1988, 1998, 2002, 2013, 2026

=== Swimming and diving ===
Nebraska sponsored a men's aquatics program from 1921 until 2001. The program was discontinued by athletic director Bill Byrne due to budgetary concerns, though it may have been hastened by a scholarship manipulation investigation that resulted in the suspension and eventual resignation of longtime head coach Cal Bentz. Under Bentz, future Olympic gold medalists Penelope Heyns and Adam Pine won NU's first NCAA Division I individual championships. Since 2001, the university has sponsored only a women's team. The team has been coached by Pablo Morales since 2001.

Nebraska has hosted meets at the Devaney Center Natatorium since its construction in 1976.

- Men's conference championships: 1928, 1929, 1935, 1936, 1937, 1980, 1981, 1982, 1983, 1984, 1985, 1986, 1987, 1988, 1989, 1990, 1991, 1992, 1993, 1994
- Women's conference championships: 1985, 1986, 1987, 1990, 1991, 1994, 1995, 1996, 1997, 1998

=== Tennis ===
Nebraska's men's tennis program was established in 1928 and has reached the NCAA Division I championships just three times. In 1989, Steven Jung was the NCAA Singles runner-up and was named NU's first All-American. The team has been coached by Peter Kobelt since 2023.

A women's program was established in 1976 and has made the NCAA Division I championship six times, most recently in 2013. German Dalmagro was named the program's tenth head coach in 2023 following the retirement of Scott Jacobson.

Both programs have hosted matches at the Sid and Hazel Dillon Tennis Center since 2015.

- Women's conference championships (4): 1977, 1978, 2013, 2020

=== Track and field ===
Track and field became Nebraska's second varsity sport in 1889, competing infrequently until the MVIAA began sponsoring an outdoor championship in 1908. The team has won thirty-eight indoor and thirty-one outdoor conference championships, producing thirty-six individual national champion. A women's team was created in 1976 and has won twenty-four indoor and eighteen outdoor conference championships with thirty-seven national champions. Nebraska's only three team national titles came in the early 1980s in women's indoor competition, led by Jamaican sprinter and nine-time Olympic medalist Merlene Ottey. Gary Pepin retired in 2022 after four decades as Nebraska's head coach and assistant Justin St. Clair was named his replacement.

The programs host indoor meets at the Bob Devaney Sports Center and outdoor meets at an incomplete facility on Nebraska Innovation Campus.

- Men's indoor conference championships (38): 1930, 1931, 1932, 1933, 1936, 1937, 1938, 1940, 1941, 1942, 1949, 1951, 1963, 1972, 1973, 1978, 1985, 1987, 1988, 1989, 1992, 1994, 1995, 1996, 1997, 1998, 2000, 2001, 2002, 2003, 2004, 2005, 2007, 2015, 2016, 2019
- Men's outdoor conference championships (29): 1921, 1922, 1923, 1924, 1926, 1929, 1932, 1933, 1936, 1937, 1939, 1940, 1941, 1942, 1950, 1966, 1987, 1989, 1990, 1995, 1996, 1998, 2000, 2002, 2004, 2009, 2010, 2013, 2016
- Women's indoor conference championships (24): 1980, 1981, 1982, 1983, 1984, 1985, 1986, 1987, 1988, 1989, 1990, 1991, 1992, 1993, 1994, 1995, 1996, 1997, 2000, 2001, 2004, 2005, 2011, 2012
- **Women's indoor AIAW** (1) / **NCAA Division I** (2) championships: 1982, 1983, 1984
- Women's outdoor conference championships (18): 1980, 1981, 1982, 1983, 1984, 1985, 1986, 1987, 1988, 1989, 1990, 1991, 1992, 1993, 1994, 1995, 2000, 2005

=== Volleyball ===
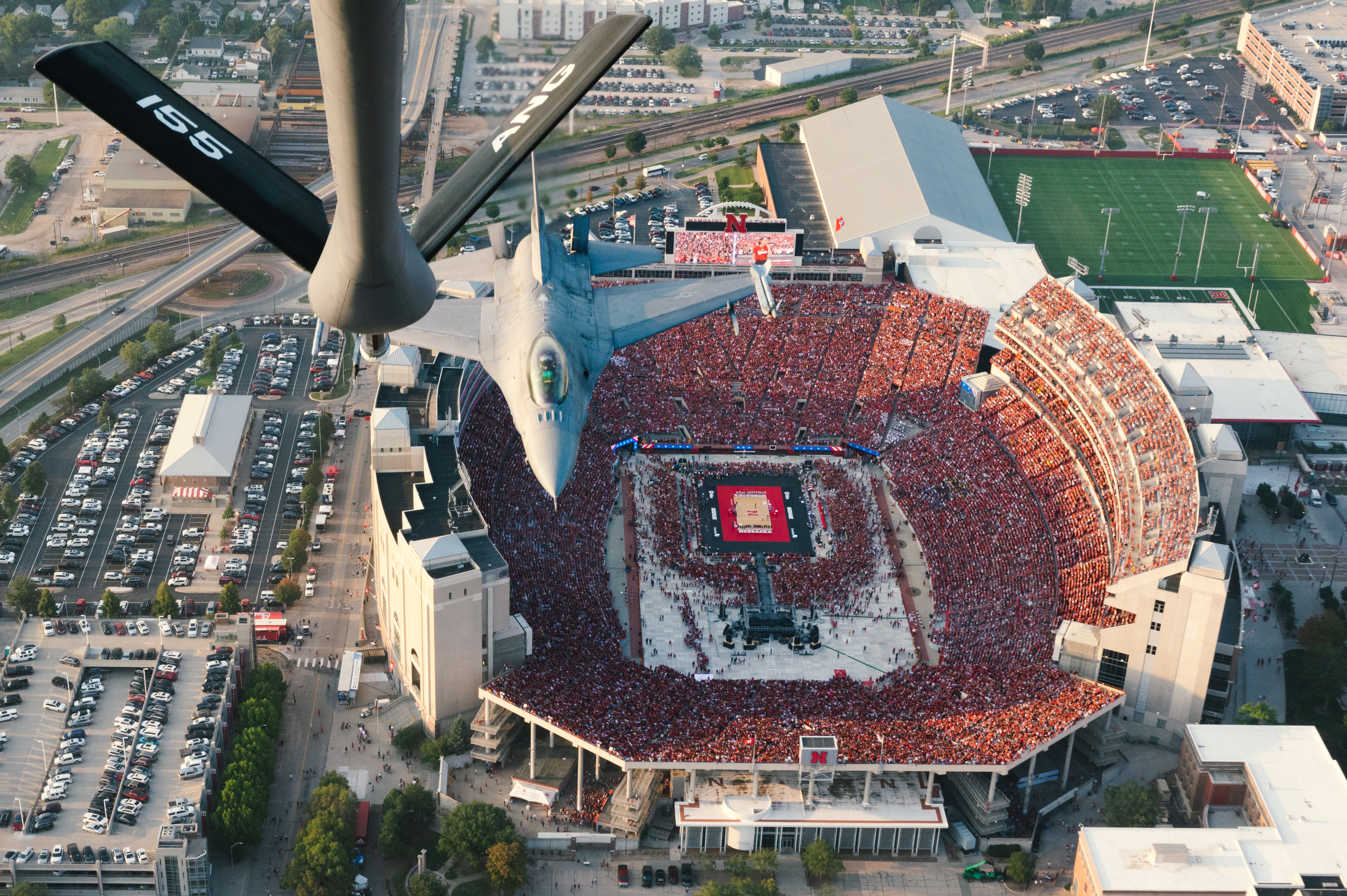
A KC-135 Stratotanker of the Nebraska Air National Guard and a F-16 Fighting Falcon of the South Dakota Air National Guard conduct a pregame flyover.

Nebraska's volleyball program was established in 1975 and has become one of the most decorated in the sport – Nebraska has won more games, spent more weeks ranked number one, and produced more AVCA All-Americans than any other program. Head coach Terry Pettit, hired in 1977, turned the Cornhuskers into a national power at a time when the sport was traditionally dominated by West Coast schools. He produced NU's first national championship in 1995 before handing the program over to assistant John Cook five years later. Cook led the NCAA's second-ever undefeated season in his debut as head coach and soon established himself as one of the best coaches in the sport's history, winning four national championships and producing some of volleyball's biggest stars, including Sarah Pavan, Jordan Larson, and Lexi Rodriguez. Cook retired in 2025, assisting in the selection of Dani Busboom Kelly as his successor.

Nebraska regularly leads the NCAA in attendance and has competed in several of the highest-attended and most-watched volleyball games ever played. The university hosted Volleyball Day in Nebraska at Memorial Stadium on August 30, 2023; the recorded attendance of 92,003 was a venue record that ranks as one of the highest-attended women's sporting events ever. Nebraska played nearly four decades at the NU Coliseum until moving to the larger Bob Devaney Sports Center in 2012, and has sold out every home game since 2001 across both venues.

- Conference championships (37): 1976, 1977, 1978, 1979, 1980, 1981, 1982, 1983, 1984, 1985, 1986, 1987, 1988, 1989, 1990, 1991, 1992, 1994, 1995, 1996, 1998, 1999, 2000, 2001, 2002, 2004, 2005, 2006, 2007, 2008, 2010, 2011, 2016, 2017, 2023, 2024, 2025
- Conference tournament championships (18): 1976, 1977, 1978, 1979, 1980, 1981, 1982, 1983, 1984, 1985, 1986, 1988, 1989, 1990, 1991, 1994, 1995
- NCAA Division I national semifinal (18): 1986, 1989, 1990, 1995, 1996, 1998, 2000, 2001, 2005, 2006, 2008, 2015, 2016, 2017, 2018, 2021, 2023, 2024
- **NCAA Division I championships** (5): 1995, 2000, 2006, 2015, 2017

Beach volleyball

Nebraska's beach volleyball program was established in 2013 as a training and recruiting tool for its indoor team, and the rosters typically include the same players. Indoor head coach John Cook led the beach team until turning the program over to assistant Jaylen Reyes in 2023. Nebraska remains one of few beach volleyball programs throughout the Midwest and generally plays the bulk of its season during a spring trip to California and Hawaii, and does not attempt to qualify for the sixteen-team NCAA championship.

=== Wrestling ===
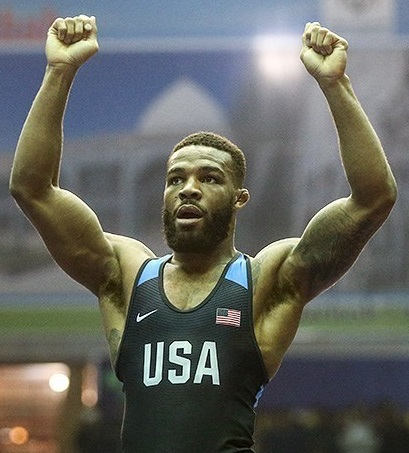
Jordan Burroughs is the most decorated American wrestler of all-time

Since its inception in 1911, Nebraska's wrestling program has won seven conference tournament titles and produced eleven individual NCAA champions with 136 All-America selections. Rulon Gardner and Jordan Burroughs became Olympic gold medalists after their collegiate careers; Burroughs is the most decorated American wrestler of all-time and is considered one of the greatest freestyle wrestlers ever. The team has been coached by Mark Manning since 2000.

Nebraska primarily hosted meets at the NU Coliseum from 1926 until moving to the larger Bob Devaney Sports Center in 2013.

- Individual national champions (13): Mike Nissen (1963 – 123 lb), Jim Scherr (1984 – 177 lb), Bill Scherr (1984 – 190 lb), Jason Kelber (1991 – 126 lb), Tony Purler (1993 – 126 lb), Tolly Thompson (1995 – HWT), Brad Vering (2000 – 197 lb), Jason Powell (2004 – 125 lb), Paul Donahoe (2007 – 125 lb), Jordan Burroughs (2009 – 157 lb, 2011 – 165 lb), Ridge Lovett (2025 – 149 lb), Antrell Taylor (2025 – 157 lb)
- Conference championships (7): 1911, 1915, 1924, 1949, 1993, 1995, 2009

== National Championships ==
=== NCAA team championships ===
Nebraska has won 21 NCAA team national championships.

- Men's (8)
  - Gymnastics (8): 1979, 1980, 1981, 1982, 1983, 1988, 1990, 1994
- Women's (13)
  - Bowling (6): 2004, 2005, 2009, 2013, 2015, 2021
  - Indoor Track and Field (2): 1983, 1984
  - Volleyball (5): 1995, 2000, 2006, 2015, 2017

=== Other national team championships ===
Below are 8 national team titles that were not bestowed by the NCAA.

- Men's (5)
  - Football (5): 1970, 1971, 1994, 1995, 1997
- Women's (3)
  - Bowling (2): 1999, 2001 (IBC)
  - Indoor Track and Field (1): 1982 (AIAW)

== Club sports ==
The University of Nebraska–Lincoln sponsors forty-one club programs: angling, badminton, barbell, baseball, women's basketball, bowling, broomball, climbing, cricket, curling, cycling, dodgeball, figure skating, figure 8 racing, men's ice hockey, women's ice hockey, golf, judo, men's lacrosse, women's lacrosse, sports officiating, pickleball, roundnet, rowing, men's rugby, running, sailing, shotgun, skateboarding, men's soccer, women's soccer, softball, swimming, table tennis, taekwondo, tennis, men's ultimate frisbee, women's ultimate frisbee, men's volleyball, women's volleyball, and water skiing.

== Athletic directors ==
In its earliest days, the Nebraska Department of Athletics had no central figure; the department's first leaders typically were part-time officials who held others titles and responsibilities. The first "Athletics Manager" was multi-sport coach Raymond G. Clapp, who filled the role from 1902 to 1905. It became a full-time position in 1920 and was first held by Fred Luehring.

Beginning with Luehring, Nebraska recognizes seventeen official athletic directors, though at least fourteen others have held the role in an interim or de facto capacity. NU's longest-serving athletic director was Bob Devaney, who led the department from 1967 to 1992. Including Devaney, five members of the College Football Hall of Fame have held the position.

== Home venues ==
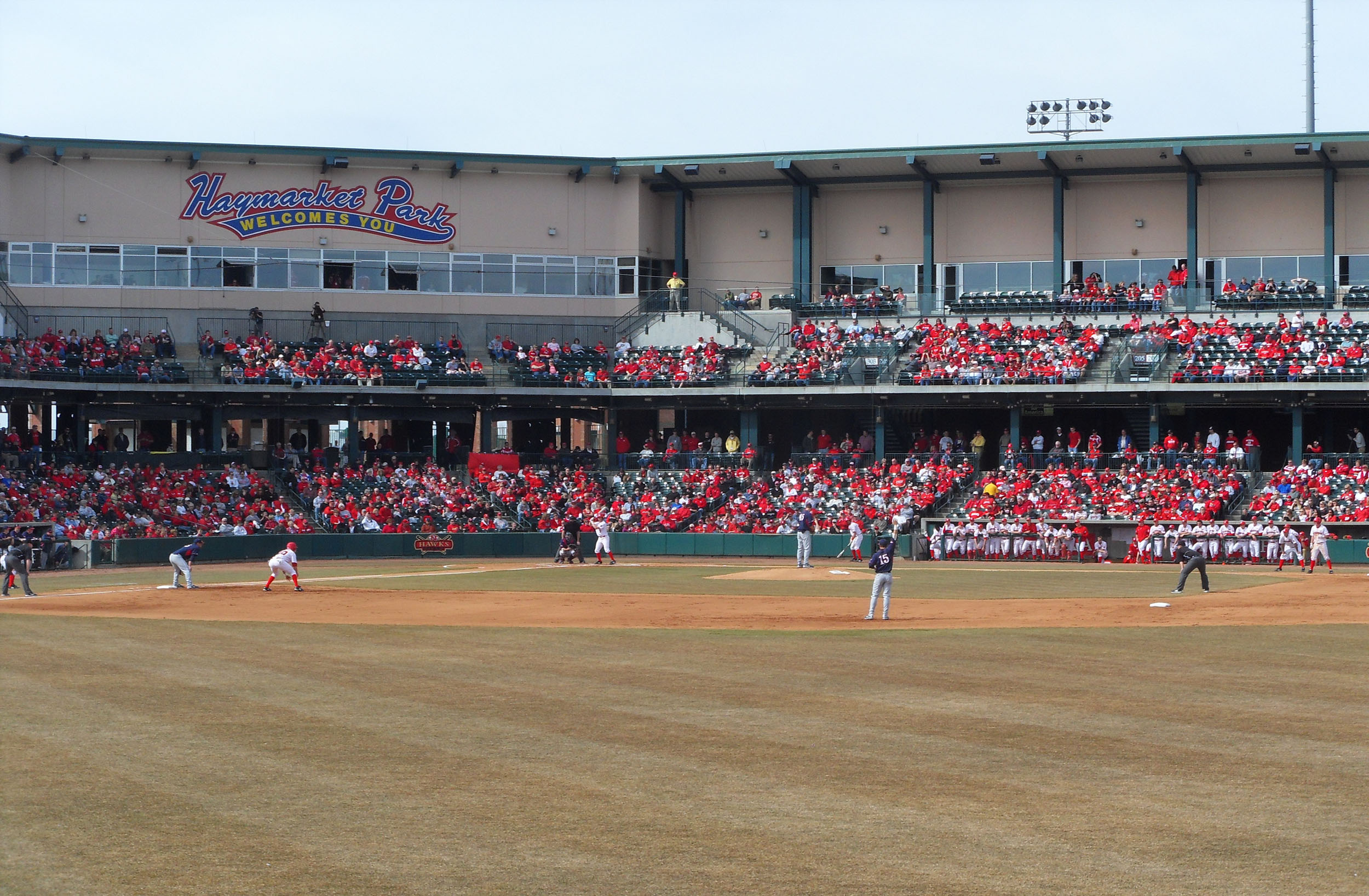
Nebraska vs. Fresno State at Hawks Field at Haymarket Park on Mar. 11, 2011

Venue	Built	Sport(s)
City Campus
Hawks Championship Center	2006	Beach volleyball
Memorial Stadium	1923	Football
Military and Naval Science Building	1947	Rifle
NU Coliseum	1926	None (former home venue)
East Campus
Husker Bowling Center	1977	Bowling
Nebraska Innovation Campus
Bob Devaney Sports Center	1976	Gymnastics; Swimming & diving Indoor track & field Volleyball; Wrestling
Nebraska Outdoor Track	2026	Cross country Outdoor track & field
Off campus
Barbara Hibner Soccer Stadium	2015	Soccer; Flag football
Bowlin Stadium	2001	Softball
Hawks Field	2001	Baseball
John Breslow Ice Hockey Center (Note: The Ice Box, located on Innovation Campus, is owned by the university and was formerly the club team's home arena.)	2015	Ice hockey (club)
Pinnacle Bank Arena	2013	Basketball
Sid and Hazel Dillon Tennis Center	2015	Tennis
Wilderness Ridge Golf Club (Note: Wilderness Ridge is the primary home course for Nebraska's golf teams but is not owned or operated by the university.)	2001	Golf

== Olympians ==
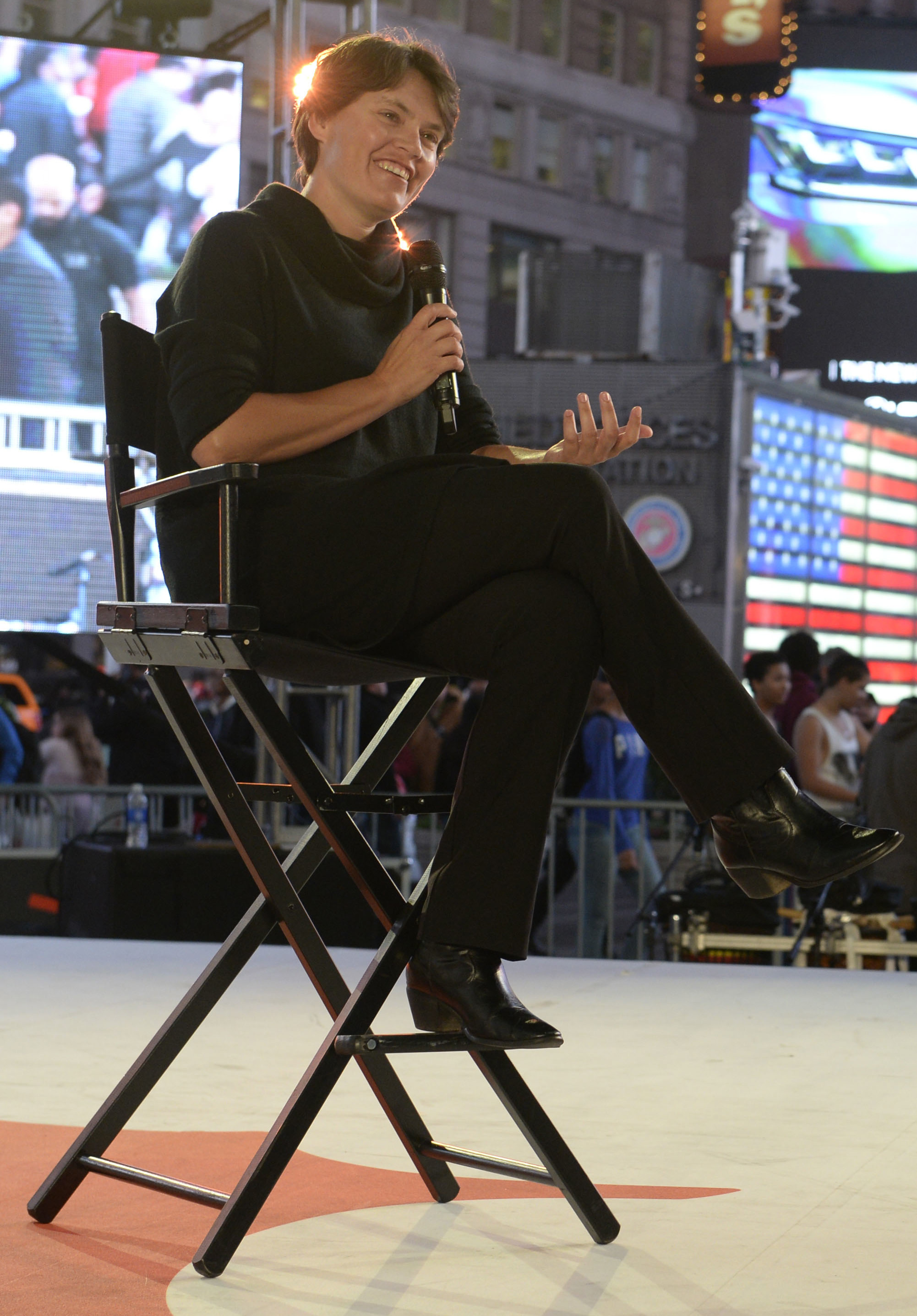
Swimmer Penelope Heyns is the only Nebraska athlete to win multiple Olympic gold medals

A total of 124 Nebraska athletes have combined to make 181 appearances in the Olympic Games. Nebraska athletes and coaches have won sixty-three medals, including nineteen gold medals, while representing thirty-one countries. Merlene Ottey is Nebraska's most decorated Olympian in terms of medals won, winning three silver and seven six bronze across seven Olympic Games, a record for track and field competitors. South African swimmer Penelope Heyns – the only Cornhusker with multiple gold medals – is the only woman to ever win the 100- and 200-meter breaststroke events at the same Olympiad.

Nebraska's Olympic gold medalists
Athlete	1st place, gold medalist(s)	2nd place, silver medalist(s)	3rd place, bronze medalist(s)
(South Africa) Penelope Heyns	2	0	1
(Jamaica) Don Quarrie	1	2	1
(United States) Jordan Larson	1	2	1
(Australia) Adam Pine	1	2	1
(United States) Kelsey Robinson	1	1	1
(United States) Curtis Tomasevicz	1	1	0
(United States) Justine Wong-Orantes	1	1	0
(United States) Rulon Gardner	1	0	1
(United States) Charlie Greene	1	0	1
(United States) Francis Allen	1	0	0
(United States) Jordan Burroughs	1	0	0
(United States) Trent Dimas	1	0	0
(United States) Tyronn Lue	1	0	0
(United States) Jim Hartung	1	0	0
(United States) Tyler Hildebrand	1	0	0
(United States) Scott Johnson	1	0	0
(United States) Jim Mikus	1	0	0
(United States) Linetta Wilson	1	0	0

== Mascots ==
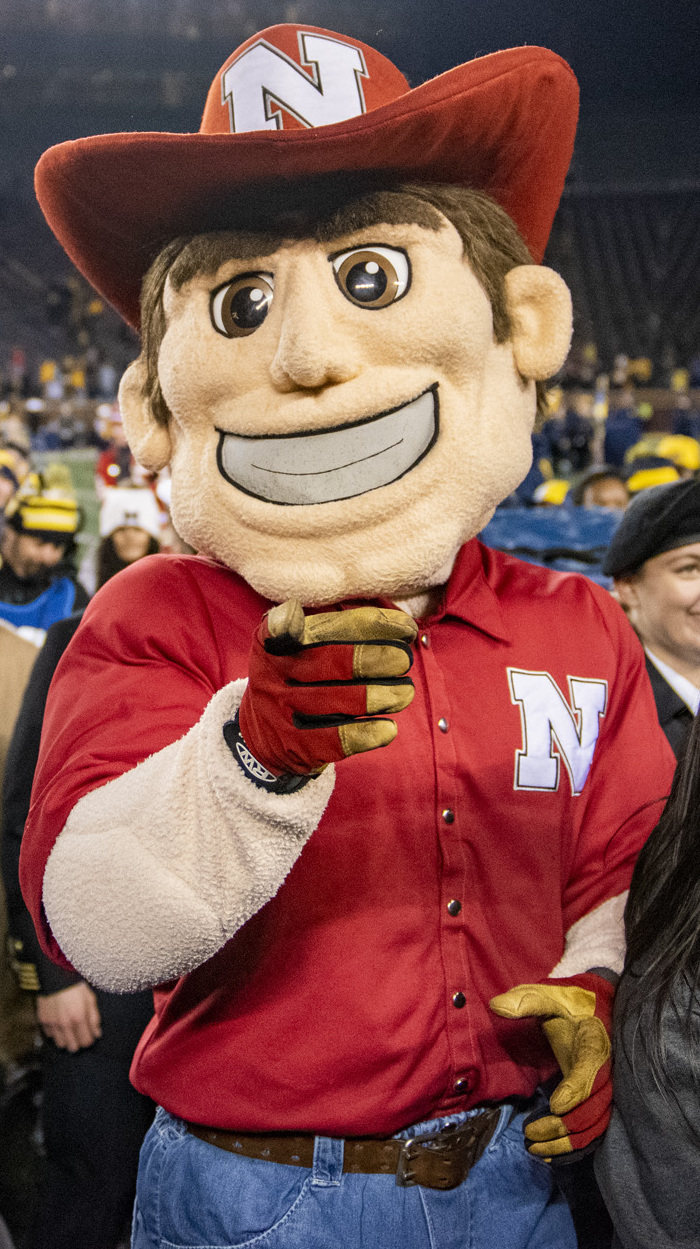
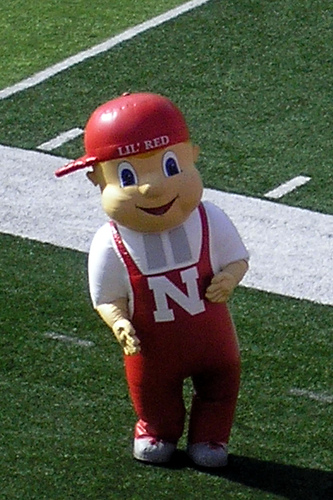
(Left) Herbie Husker as he appeared from 2003 to 2023; (right) Lil' Red

The University of Nebraska used many unofficial mascots in its early decades, most often an anthropomorphic ear of corn. The first to appear on the sideline was Corncob Man, a man in green overalls with an ear of corn for a head who debuted in 1955. In the 1960s the university sought a more "representative" mascot and created Husky the Husker, a ten-foot-tall farmer who soon gave way to Mr. Big Red (more commonly known as Harry Husker). Harry was nearly as tall as Husky but wore a red blazer and wide-brim cowboy hat.

At the 1974 Cotton Bowl Classic, NU associate athletic director Don Bryant saw artist Dirk West's interpretation of a Cornhusker – an enormous, clumsy farmer smiling and holding a football – on a press box wall and hired him to refine it into a new mascot. "Herbie Husker" made his first appearance on the cover of Nebraska's 1974 football media guide and was adopted as the school's first official mascot in 1977. Herbie is a blond-haired, blue-eyed farmer with a pronounced barrel chest and a cleft chin. He dresses in denim overalls, a white undershirt, and a red cowboy hat with an ear of corn in his pocket. In logo form, Herbie holds a football in his right arm, but various sport-specific versions exist.

Since 1993, Herbie has been joined by Lil' Red, a blond-haired, blue-eyed inflatable farm boy who stands over eight feet tall. Lil' Red was initially intended to represent the school's volleyball team and appeal to younger fans. He became so popular that the university discontinued the use of Herbie in 1995, though he was later reinstated. Nebraska says Herbie and Lil' Red are not intended to be related, but describes them as "best friends."

== Fan support ==
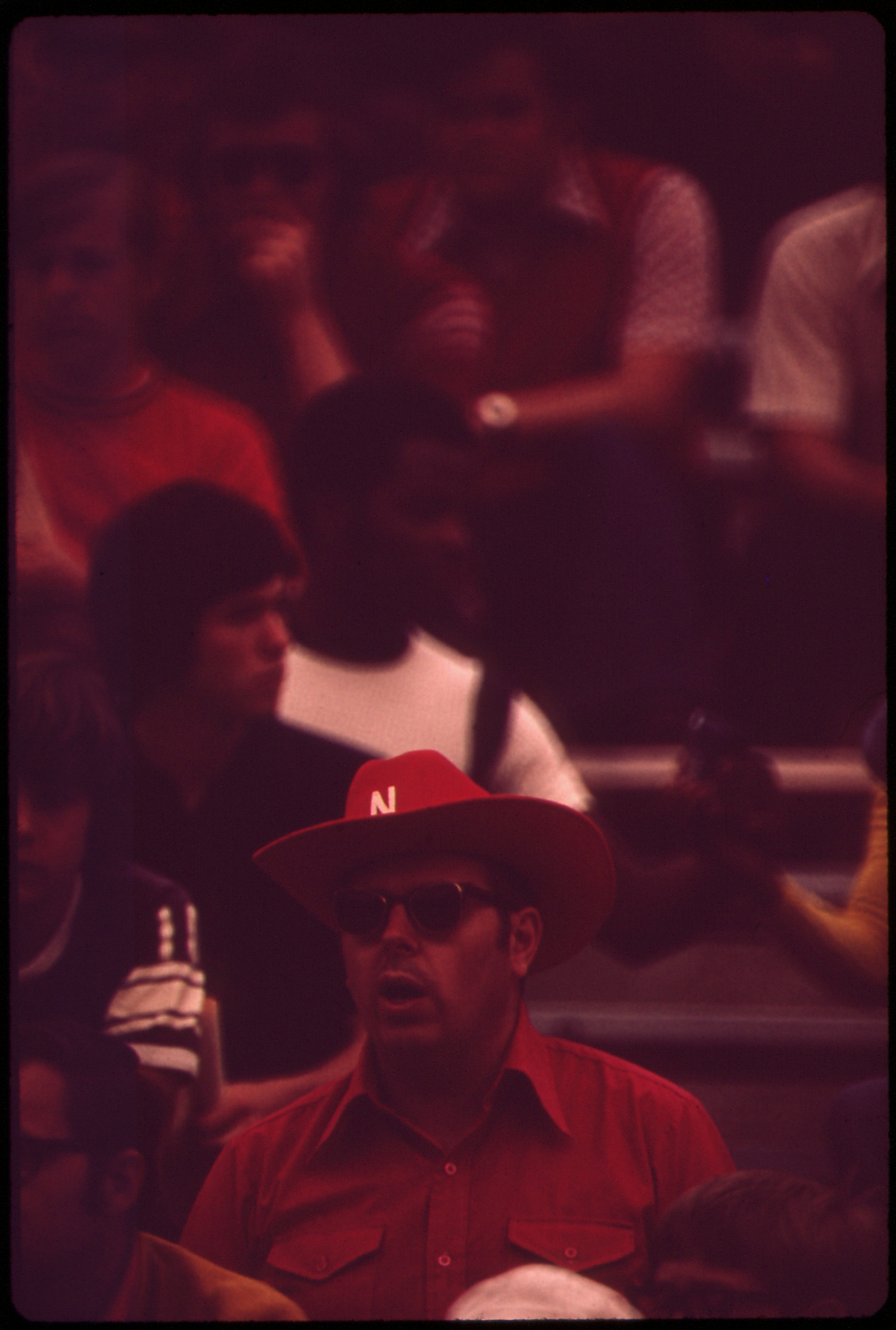
A fan attends a football game at Memorial Stadium in 1973

Decades of high attendance and well-traveling crowds across all sports have earned Nebraska fans a reputation for being fiercely loyal and dedicated. The school's athletic department proclaimed their fans "the greatest fans in college football" in an inscription above each of the twenty-four gates at Memorial Stadium. In 2001, president George W. Bush stated that he "can't go without saying how impressed I am by the Nebraska fan base. Whether it be for women's volleyball or football, there's nothing like the Big Red."

Memorial Stadium is sometimes referred to as The Sea of Red due to the home crowd's propensity to wear the color. Nebraska has sold out every home football game since November 3, 1962; at 389 it is the longest sellout streak in college athletics history. The streak, historically a source of pride for the school and its fans, has been scrutinized in the decades following Tom Osborne's retirement as NU's athletic department has occasionally been forced to sell a large number of tickets at a discounted rate to keep the streak alive. Cornhuskers fans are noted for often applauding the visiting team as they leave the field at the end of the game. Nebraska is considered to have one of the best-traveling fanbases in the country – the most famous example of this occurred in 2000, when an estimated 35,000 Nebraska fans watched No. 1 Nebraska defeat No. 25 Notre Dame at Notre Dame Stadium.

Nebraska's volleyball program has sold out 303 consecutive matches between the Nebraska Coliseum and Devaney Center, the longest streak of its kind in women's college sports. The Cornhuskers have led the country in attendance for nine straight seasons, (Note: This does not count the spring 2021 season in which many schools, including Nebraska, did not host fans due to the COVID-19 pandemic) and have played in nine of the ten highest-attended college volleyball matches ever played. Nebraska's five-set loss to Wisconsin in the 2021 national championship match broke college volleyball records for both attendance and viewership.
