= Larry Gerard =

American artistic gymnast

Gymnastics career
- Country represented: United States
- College team: Nebraska Cornhuskers

Larry Gerard is a former American artistic gymnast and member of the United States men's national artistic gymnastics team. He was selected for the 1980 Olympics but was unable to participate due to the 1980 Summer Olympics boycott.

Gerard's mother died of a blood disease when he was three years old and his father later died of a heart attack in 1965. He lived with his stepmother until she kicked him out at 16. Larry's brother, Alex, had previously attended Lincoln Southeast High School and was a state champion gymnast and Gerard followed in his footsteps. Gerard won the Nebraska state all-around title in 1974 and was considered one of the greatest athletes in Lincoln Southeast High School history.

He later attended University of Nebraska–Lincoln and was a member of the Nebraska Cornhuskers men's gymnastics team. Gerard was nominated for the Nissen-Emery Award in 1979 as one of the best collegiate men's artistic gymnasts in the country. Gerard placed fifth in the all-around at the 1979 NCAA Men's Gymnastics Championship en route to the Cornhuskers' first NCAA title. He finished his Nebraska career as a seven-time NCAA All-American.

At the 1980 U.S. Olympic trials, Gerard made the United States men's national artistic gymnastics team with Nebraska teammates Phil Cahoy and Jim Hartung. The trio were unable to compete due to the 1980 Summer Olympics boycott.
