= Barbara Hibner Soccer Stadium =

Soccer stadium in Lincoln, Nebraska

- "The Hib"
- Interactive map of Barbara Hibner Soccer Stadium
- Location: 2400 N Antelope Valley Parkway; Lincoln, Nebraska
- Coordinates: 40.8378°N 96.7000°W
- Owner: University of Nebraska–Lincoln
- Operator: University of Nebraska–Lincoln
- Capacity: 2,500
- Type: Stadium
- Surface: Lawn

Construction
- Groundbreaking: 2014
- Opened: August 12, 2015; 11 years ago
- Cost: $20.4 million (includes Sid and Hazel Dillon Tennis Center)

Tenants
- Nebraska Cornhuskers soccer (2015–present); Nebraska Cornhuskers flag football (beginning in 2027)

Website
- huskers.com/hibner-stadium

Barbara Hibner Soccer Stadium (Hibner Stadium) is a college soccer stadium on the campus of the University of Nebraska–Lincoln in Lincoln, Nebraska. The 2,500-seat stadium opened in 2015 and serves as the primary home venue for Nebraska's soccer program. The complex is named for Barbara Hibner, an athletic administrator at the university from 1976 to 2005.

== History ==
Nebraska's soccer program was established in 1994, making NU the first school in the Big Eight Conference to sponsor a varsity women's soccer program. Until 2014, the program played its home games at the Ed Weir Track & Soccer Stadium, located along the northeast corner of Memorial Stadium. The soccer field at the Weir complex, built in 1975, was among the smallest in the Big Ten and the only one without stadium lights.

In July 2013, Nebraska's Board of Regents approved construction of a privately funded $20.4-million soccer and tennis complex to be located north of the Bob Devaney Sports Center, adjacent to Nebraska Innovation Campus. The tennis facility was named for donors Sid and Hazel Dillon; the soccer development was named in honor of Dr. Barbara Hibner, who served as an administrator overseeing women's athletic programs at Nebraska for nearly thirty years. Hibner, who spearheaded the creation of mascot Lil' Red in 1994, received the University of Nebraska athletic department's first Trailblazer Award; it was renamed in her honor following her death in 2007.

Hibner Stadium broke ground in 2014 and was dedicated on September 25, 2015. The 2,500-seat venue includes a standing-room berm on the east end of the field. John Walker, the program's head coach since its inception, said of the new stadium: "This is phenomenal. Everything is first class. There's nothing cookie-cutter about it." Nebraska ranked thirteenth nationally in attendance in its first season at Hibner Stadium.

Hibner Stadium hosted matches of the NCAA Division I women's soccer tournament in 2016 and 2023, including a round of 16 meeting between Nebraska and UC Irvine on November 19, 2023.

In July 2026, Hibner Stadium was announced as the future home of Nebraska's varsity college flag football team which will play its first season in 2027.
