= Nebraska Cornhuskers men's gymnastics =

University of Nebraska–Lincoln men's gymnastics team

- Founded: 1939; 87 years ago
- University: University of Nebraska–Lincoln
- Athletic director: Troy Dannen
- Head coach: Chuck Chmelka (17th season)
- Conference: Big Ten
- Location: Lincoln, Nebraska
- Home arena: Bob Devaney Sports Center (Capacity: 8,309)
- Nickname: Cornhuskers
- Colors: Scarlet and cream

National championships
- 1979, 1980, 1981, 1982, 1983, 1988, 1990, 1994

NCAA Tournament appearances
- 1975, 1976, 1979, 1980, 1981, 1982, 1983, 1984, 1985, 1986, 1987, 1988, 1989, 1990, 1991, 1992, 1993, 1994, 1995, 1996, 1997, 1998, 1999, 2000, 2003, 2004, 2005, 2006, 2007, 2008, 2009, 2010, 2011, 2012, 2013, 2014, 2015, (Note: Nebraska's 2015 NCAA tournament scores were vacated by the NCAA due to the use of ineligible student-athletes.) 2016 2017, 2018, 2019, 2021, 2022, 2023, 2024

Conference championships
- 1964, 1976, 1980, 1982, 1983, 1985, 1986, 1988, 1989, 1990, 1992, 1993, 1994, 1997, 1999, 2024

The Nebraska Cornhuskers men's gymnastics team competes as part of NCAA Division I, representing the University of Nebraska–Lincoln in the Big Ten Conference. NU is one of just twelve Division I universities that sponsors a men's gymnastics program. Nebraska has hosted meets at the Bob Devaney Sports Center since 1976.

Since being established in 1939, the program has won eight national championships, finished as the national runner-up seven times, and won forty-two NCAA event titles. The bulk of this success came under longtime head coach Francis Allen, a former All-American who led the program for forty seasons. Twelve Cornhuskers have participated in the Olympic Games and combined to win four gold medals. The team has been coached by Chuck Chmelka since 2010.

== Conference affiliations ==
- Missouri Valley Intercollegiate Athletic Association / Big Eight Conference (1939–1994) (Note: In 1928, the ten member schools of the Missouri Valley Intercollegiate Athletic Association agreed to a splintering of the conference – Iowa State, Kansas, Kansas State, Missouri, Nebraska, and Oklahoma retained the MVIAA name and Drake, Grinnell, Oklahoma A&M (now Oklahoma State), and Washington University formed the Missouri Valley Conference. The MVIAA became commonly known as the Big Six, and later the Big Seven and Big Eight. Its name was officially changed to the Big Eight in 1964.)
- Mountain Pacific Sports Federation (1995–2011)
- Big Ten Conference (2012–present)

== Coaches ==
=== Coaching history ===
No.	Coach	Tenure	Overall
1	Charlie E. Miller	1939–1948	16–25–2 (.395)
2	B. R. Patterson	1949	3–2 (.600)
3	Jake Geier	1950–1969	140–64–2 (.684)
4	Francis Allen	1970–2009	817–309–4 (.725) (Note: Records incomplete from the 1978 Rocky Mountain Open, 1981 Windy City Invite, 1981 Husky Classic, 1986 Windy City Invite, 1986 Titan Invite, 1986 UCLA Invite, and 1986 Southwest Cup.)
5	Chuck Chmelka	2010–present	106–183–1 (.367)

=== Coaching staff ===
Name	Position	First year	Alma mater
Chuck Chmelka	Head coach	2010	Nebraska
Zach Peters	Assistant coach	2026	Nebraska
John Robinson	Assistant coach	2011	Nebraska

== Venues ==
Nebraska played its early years at the NU Coliseum before moving to the NU Sports Complex (now the Bob Devaney Sports Center) upon its completion in 1976. When Nebraska's basketball programs moved to the newly constructed West Haymarket Arena (known as Pinnacle Bank Arena for sponsorship purposes) in 2013, the Devaney Center underwent a $20-million remodel to reconfigure and shrink its main arena.

Nebraska opened the Francis Allen Training Complex in 2020 to house its men's and women's gymnastics programs; at 46,000 square feet it is among the largest gymnastics practice facilities in the country.

== Championships and awards ==
=== National championships ===
- NCAA: 1979, 1980, 1981, 1982, 1983, 1988, 1990, 1994

=== Team conference championships ===
- Big Eight: 1964, 1976, 1980, 1982, 1983, 1985, 1986, 1988, 1989, 1990, 1992, 1993, 1994
- Mountain Pacific Sports Federation: 1997, 1999

Big Ten: 2024

=== Individual awards ===
- NCAA Top Ten Award: Tom Schlesinger (1989), Patrick Kirksey (1991), Anton Stephenson (2020)
- National coach of the year: Francis Allen (1979, 1980, 1981, 1982, 1983, 1988, 1990, 1994)
- Conference gymnast of the year: Marshall Nelson (1998), Jason Hardabura (1999), Derek Leiter (2000), Grant Clinton (2002), Anton Stephenson (2019), Taylor Christopulos (2023, 2025)
- Conference freshman of the year: Taylor Christopulos (2021), Chris Hiser (2022)
- Conference coach of the year: Francis Allen (1999)

=== NCAA champions ===
- Phil Cahoy – 1980 (HB, PB), 1981 (HB, PB)
- Steve Elliott – 1980 (FX), 1982 (FX, V)
- Jim Hartung – 1980 (AA, SR), 1981 (AA, PB, SR), 1982 (PB, SR)
- Scott Johnson – 1983 (FX, HB, PB)
- Chris Riegel – 1983 (V), 1984 (V)
- Wes Suter – 1985 (AA, FX, HB)
- Tom Schlesinger – 1987 (AA, PB)
- Kevin Davis – 1987 (PB), 1988 (AA, PB)
- Patrick Kirksey – 1989 (AA, PB), 1990 (PB)
- Che Bowers – 1992 (PH)
- Richard Grace – 1993 (FX), 1994 (PB)
- Dennis Harrison – 1994 (AA)
- Rick Kieffer – 1995 (HB)
- Richard Grace – 1995 (AA, PB)
- Marshall Nelson – 1997 (HB. PB), 1998 (PB)
- Jason Hardabura – 1999 (AA, FX)
- Asher Cohen – 2026 (SR)

=== First-team NCAA All-Americans ===
- Phillip Sprague – 1948 (T)
- Bruce Riley – 1955 (HB)
- Karl Byers – 1959 (PH)
- Dennis Albers – 1964 (V)
- Francis Allen – 1964 (PB)
- Gene Mackie – 1975 (AA)
- Pete Studenski – 1975 (SR)
- Jim Unger – 1975 (FX)
- Steve Dickey – 1976 (PH)
- Larry Gerard – 1976 (AA, HB, SR), 1977 (HB), 1978 (AA, HB, SR)
- Kurt Mackie – (SR)
- Mark Williams – 1978 (HB)
- Jim Hartung – 1979 (AA, FX, PB, PH, SR), 1980 (AA, FX, PB, PH, SR), 1981 (AA, FX, HB, PB, PH, SR), 1982 (AA, FX, HB, PB, PH, SR)
- Phil Cahoy – 1980 (AA, HB, PB), 1981 (AA, HB, PB), 1982 (AA, PB, PH), 1983 (AA)
- Steve Elliott – 1980 (FX, V), 1982 (FX, V)
- Scott Johnson – 1980 (V), 1981 (HB, SR), 1982 (AA, FX), 1983 (AA, FX, HB, PB, SR, V)
- Frank Hibbitts – 1981 (PH)
- John Balluff – 1982 (PH)
- Jim Mikus – 1982 (AA, FX), 1983 (HB), 1984 (FX, HB)
- Chris Riegel – 1983 (AA, V), 1984 (AA, FX, HB, PB, V)
- Mike Epperson – 1985 (PB), 1989 HB)
- Neil Palmer – 1985 (HB)
- Wes Suter – 1985 (AA, FX, HB), 1986 (AA, PB)
- Kevin Davis – 1986 (PB), 1987 (AA, PB, PH), 1988 (AA, PB, SR)
- Tom Schlesinger – 1986 (PB), 1987 (AA, HB, PB), 1988 (AA, HB, SR)
- Patrick Kirksey – 1988 (V), 1989 (AA, HB, PB, PH), 1990 (AA, PB, PH)
- Bob Stelter – 1988 (V), 1989 (AA), 1990 (AA)
- Mark Warburton – 1988 (PB), 1990 (PB, SR)
- Trent Dimas – 1990 (FX, HB)
- Dennis Harrison – 1991 (V), 1992 (AA, HB), 1993 (AA, PB), 1994 (AA, FX, HB, PB, PH, V)
- Che Bowers – 1992 (HB, PH), 1993 (HB, PH), 1994 (PH)
- Sumner Darling – 1992 (PB), 1994 (AA)
- Rich Kieffer – 1992 (HB), 1993 (SR), 1994 (SR), 1995 (HB)
- Josh Saegert – 1992 (PB)
- Richard Grace – 1993 (FX), 1994 (AA, HB, PB), 1995 (AA, PB)
- Burkett Powell – 1994 (PB)
- Jason Christie – 1996 (HB, PB)
- Ted Harris – 1996 (SR)
- Marshall Nelson – 1996 (PH), 1997 (HB, PB, V), 1998 (PB, PH)
- Ryan McEwen – 1997 (HB)
- Jim Koziol – 1998 SR), 1999 (SR)
- Derek Leiter – 1998 (AA), 2000 (AA, V)
- Bill Mulholland – 1998 (V)
- Blake Bukacek – 1999 (HB)
- Jason Hardabura – 1999 (AA, FX, HB)
- Dusty Jakub – 2000 (PB)
- Ashter Lichterman – 2000 (V)
- Steven Friedman – 2003 (PB)
- Josh Rasile – 2004 (SR)
- Paul Chumreonlert – 2005 (PH)
- Stephen Tetrault – 2005 (V), 2007 (AA, PH)
- T. J. Schmidt – 2007 (PH)
- Anthony Ingrelli – 2010 (SR)
- Grant Perdue – 2012 (FX), 2013 (V)
- Wyatt Aycock – 2013 (AA), 2014 (AA)
- Sam Chamberlain – 2013 (PB), 2016 (PB)
- Ethan Lottman – 2015 (AA), 2016 (PH)
- Austin Epperson – 2016 (FX), 2017 (FX)
- Anton Stephenson – 2016 (PB), 2018 (V), 2019 (AA, V)
- Kyle King – 2017 (FX)
- Connor Adamsick – 2018 (FX)
- Griffin Kehler – 2018 (FX)
- Chris Stehenson – 2018 (PB)
- Jake Bonnay – 2019 (FX)
- Charlie Giles – 2019 (V), 2021 (PH, V)
- Khalil Jackson – 2019 (HB)
- Josh Martin – 2019 (PH)
- Taylor Christopulus – 2021 (V), 2023 (AA, FX, PB), 2024 (AA, FX, HB, V), 2025 (AA, PH)
- Evan Kriley – 2021 (PH)
- Mitch Tyndall – 2021 (PH)
- Dillan King – 2022 (PB)
- Donte McKinney – 2022 (V), 2023 (HB)
- Zac Tiderman – 2023 (V), 2024 (HB, V)
- Asher Cohen – 2024 (SR), 2025 (SR)
- Cooper Giles – 2024 (PH)
- Sam Phillips – 2024 (AA, HB)
- Chris Hiser – 2025 (SR)
- Chase Mondi – 2025 (FX)
- Max Odden – 2025 (HB)

== Seasons ==
National champion	Regular season champion (Note: The Big Ten began crowning a regular-season champion in 2019.)	Tournament champion

Year	Coach	Overall	Conference tournament	Postseason
MVIAA / Big Eight Conference (1939–1994)
1939	Charlie E. Miller	5–3	Not available (Note: Conference tournament information not available prior to 1964.)	
1940	Charlie E. Miller	2–3	Not available	
1941	Charlie E. Miller	4–2	Not available	
1942	Charlie E. Miller	1–9	Not available	
1943	Did not compete (World War II)			
1944	Did not compete (World War II)			
1945	Did not compete (World War II)			
1946	Did not compete (World War II)			
1947	Charlie E. Miller	1–4–1	Not available	Not held
1948	Charlie E. Miller	3–4–1	Not available	
1949	B. R. Patterson	3–2	Not available	
1950	Jake Geier	2–3	Not available	
1951	Jake Geier	5–5	Not available	
1952	Jake Geier	6–3	Not available	
1953	Jake Geier	10–1	Not available	
1954	Jake Geier	7–1	Not available	
1955	Jake Geier	5–1	Not available	
1956	Jake Geier	5–1	Not available	
1957	Jake Geier	8–2	Not available	
1958	Jake Geier	5–4–1	Not available	
1959	Jake Geier	10–2	Not available	
1960	Jake Geier	5–0	Not available	
1961	Jake Geier	7–2	Not available	
1962	Jake Geier	8–2	Not available	
1963	Jake Geier	13–1	Not available	
1964	Jake Geier	11–1	1st	
1965	Jake Geier	9–4–1	3rd	
1966	Jake Geier	6–9	4th	
1967	Jake Geier	9–8	4th	
1968	Jake Geier	8–7	5th	
1969	Jake Geier	2–12	6th	
1970	Francis Allen	5–8	5th	
1971	Francis Allen	3–7	5th	
1972	Francis Allen	5–8	4th	
1973	Francis Allen	7–4	2nd	
1974	Francis Allen	6–4	3rd	
1975	Francis Allen	11–8	2nd	NCAA 5th
1976	Francis Allen	12–6	1st	NCAA preliminaries
1977	Francis Allen	37–19	3rd	
1978	Francis Allen	31–14	3rd	
1979	Francis Allen	66–6	2nd	NCAA champion
1980	Francis Allen	37–3	1st	NCAA champion
1981	Francis Allen	15–2	2nd	NCAA champion
1982	Francis Allen	39–0	1st	NCAA champion
1983	Francis Allen	45–0	1st	NCAA champion
1984	Francis Allen	31–10	2nd	NCAA preliminaries
1985	Francis Allen	41–5	1st	NCAA runner-up
1986	Francis Allen	21–3	1st	NCAA runner-up
1987	Francis Allen	25–4–1	2nd	NCAA runner-up
1988	Francis Allen	28–3	1st	NCAA champion
1989	Francis Allen	22–4	1st	NCAA runner-up
1990	Francis Allen	37–2–1	1st	NCAA champion
1991	Francis Allen	12–16	2nd	NCAA preliminaries
1992	Francis Allen	39–4	1st	NCAA runner-up
1993	Francis Allen	32–1	1st	NCAA runner-up
1994	Francis Allen	32–3	1st	NCAA champion
Mountain Pacific Sports Federation (1995–2011)
1995	Francis Allen	26–11–1	3rd	NCAA runner-up
1996	Francis Allen	18–9	4th	NCAA regional
1997	Francis Allen	21–8	1st	NCAA regional
1998	Francis Allen	18–7	2nd	NCAA regional
1999	Francis Allen	24–6–1	T–1st	NCAA 3rd
2000	Francis Allen	10–11	3rd	NCAA 9th
2001	Francis Allen	7–6	3rd	
2002	Francis Allen	5–12	4th	
2003	Francis Allen	4–16	4th	NCAA 11th
2004	Francis Allen	13–16	4th	NCAA 10th
2005	Francis Allen	13–13	4th	NCAA 10th
2006	Francis Allen	4–15	4th	NCAA 10th
2007	Francis Allen	6–14	4th	NCAA 10th
2008	Francis Allen	7–14	4th	NCAA 9th
2009	Francis Allen	2–7	4th	NCAA 9th
2010	Chuck Chmelka	8–10	4th	NCAA 9th
2011	Chuck Chmelka	6–16	4th	NCAA 10th
Big Ten Conference (2012–present)
2012	Chuck Chmelka	5–19	7th	NCAA 9th
2013	Chuck Chmelka	5–19	7th	NCAA 11th
2014	Chuck Chmelka	5–22	6th	NCAA 8th
2015	Chuck Chmelka	2–18	7th	NCAA
2016	Chuck Chmelka	5–17–1	6th	NCAA 7th
2017	Chuck Chmelka	12–17	5th	NCAA 6th
2018	Chuck Chmelka	14–14	6th	NCAA 5th
2019	Chuck Chmelka	8–6	4th	NCAA 3rd
2020	Chuck Chmelka	7–2	Canceled (COVID-19)	
2021	Chuck Chmelka	9–8	6th	NCAA 4th
2022	Chuck Chmelka	9–5	2nd	NCAA 4th
2023	Chuck Chmelka	10–6	3rd	NCAA 5th
2024	Chuck Chmelka	6–2	3rd	NCAA 4th
2025	Chuck Chmelka	3–4	3rd	NCAA 4th

== Olympians ==
Ten Nebraska gymnasts and two coaches have combined to compete in sixteen Summer Olympiads, with nine representing the United States and one representing Canada. Francis Allen, Phil Cahoy, Larry Gerard, and Jim Hartung were a part of the U. S.-led boycott of the 1980 Summer Olympics in Moscow and did not participate in any events. Four years later, Hartung and two other NU gymnasts, Jim Mikus and Scott Johnson, won the team all-around gold medal in Los Angeles. Trent Dimas won Nebraska's only individual gymnastics gold medal on the horizontal bar in Barcelona in 1992; it was the second American gymnastics gold medal in an Olympiad held outside the United States.

Olympiad	City	Gymnast	Country	Medal(s)
1980 (XXII)	(Soviet Union) Moscow	Phil Cahoy	United States	Boycotted
1980 (XXII)	(Soviet Union) Moscow	Larry Gerard	United States	Boycotted
1980 (XXII)	(Soviet Union) Moscow	Jim Hartung	United States	Boycotted
1980 (XXII)	(Soviet Union) Moscow	Francis Allen (head coach)	United States	Boycotted
1984 (XXIII)	(United States) Los Angeles	Jim Hartung	United States	(gold) Gold (Team all-around)
1984 (XXIII)	(United States) Los Angeles	Jim Mikus	United States	(gold) Gold (Team all-around)
1984 (XXIII)	(United States) Los Angeles	Scott Johnson	United States	(gold) Gold (Team all-around)
1988 (XXIV)	(South Korea) Seoul	Kevin Davis	United States	
1988 (XXIV)	(South Korea) Seoul	Scott Johnson	United States	
1988 (XXIV)	(South Korea) Seoul	Tom Schlesinger	United States	
1988 (XXIV)	(South Korea) Seoul	Wes Suter	United States	
1992 (XXV)	(Spain) Barcelona	Trent Dimas	United States	(gold) Gold (Horizontal bar)
1992 (XXV)	(Spain) Barcelona	Francis Allen (head coach)	United States	
1996 (XXVI)	(United States) Atlanta	Mark Williams (asst. coach)	United States	
2016 (XXXI)	(Brazil) Rio de Janeiro	Mark Williams (head coach)	United States	
2024 (XXXIII)	(France) Paris	Yanni Chronopoulos (alternate)	Canada	
