= Tom Schlesinger =

American artistic gymnast

- Full name: Thomas Kurt Schlesinger
- Born: 1965 or 1966 (age 59–60)
- Height: 5 ft 7 in (170 cm)

Gymnastics career
- Discipline: Men's artistic gymnastics
- Country represented: United States; (–1992)
- College team: Nebraska Cornhuskers
- Head coach: Francis Allen
- Awards: Nissen-Emery Award (1988)
Medal record
Men's artistic gymnastics
Representing United States
Event	1st	2nd	3rd
Pan American Games	1	0	0
Total	1	0	0
Pan American Games
Gold medal – first place	1987 Indianapolis	Team

Thomas Kurt Schlesinger (born c. 1965 or 1966) is a retired American artistic gymnast. He was a member of the United States men's national artistic gymnastics team and won a gold medal at the 1987 Pan American Games.

== Early life and education ==
Schlesinger has called Fort Collins, Colorado, and Boulder, Colorado, home. As a youth, he participated in gymnastics with his older brother Arthur and Tom was the Colorado state all-around championship while in high school. In April 1982 while Schlesinger was recovering from right knee reconstruction, he witnessed his older brother Arthur fall from the horizontal bar while warming up which resulted in Arthur's paralysis. He graduated from Poudre High School in Fort Collins.

Schlesinger was recruited by numerous colleges for gymnastics including California State University, Fullerton, University of Oklahoma, Ohio State University, and University of California, Berkeley, but chose to attend University of Nebraska–Lincoln. Head coach Francis Allen called Schlesinger "probably the best p-bar man who's ever come into Nebraska as a freshman."

== Gymnastics career ==
While a student at Nebraska, Schlesinger was a Nebraska Cornhuskers men's gymnastics team member. He competed from 1985 to 1988 and finished as one of the most accomplished gymnasts in program history with 38 combined individual titles. As a junior, he was the 1987 NCAA men's gymnastics championship all-around champion and was the co-champion on the parallel bars with Nebraska teammate Kevin Davis. Nebraska won the 1988 NCAA men's gymnastics championship team title and Schlesinger was awarded the 1988 Nissen-Emery Award as the top senior male collegiate gymnast.

Schlesinger was a member of the United States men's national artistic gymnastics team for seven consecutive years. He was a member of the gold medal-winning United States team at the 1987 Pan American Games and was also a member of the 1987 Worlds team. He was later named an alternate for the 1988 Summer Olympics. Schlesinger was also named to the 1989 and 1991 Worlds teams, but could not compete in either due to injury. In 1990, Schlesinger competed in the International Masters Tournament in Cottbus, Germany, winning silver medals on parallel bars and horizontal bar.

At the 1991 U.S. National Gymnastics Championships, Schlesinger placed fourth and was named to the 1991 World Artistic Gymnastics Championships team for the United States but a shoulder injury forced him to be replaced by John Roethlisberger. He was petitioned into the 1992 United States Olympic trials due to injury, but an 18th place finish resulted in him not being selected for the 1992 Summer Olympics.

== Legacy ==
Schlesinger was inducted into the USA Gymnastics Hall of Fame as a member of the class of 2006. He was later inducted into the University of Nebraska Athletics Hall of Fame in 2018.

== Personal life ==
Following his gymnastics career, Schlesinger earned his PhD from the University of Colorado, graduated from the University of Southern California's Keck School of Medicine, and became an ophthalmologist and retina specialist. In his spare time he enjoys juggling fruit.
