= Karen Jennings =

American basketball player

Personal information
- Listed height: 6 ft 2 in (1.88 m)

Career information
- College: Nebraska (1990–1993)
- Position: Forward
- Number: 51

Career highlights
- Wade Trophy (1993); 2x Women's Basketball Academic All-American of the Year (1992, 1993); Kodak All-American (1993); 2x Big 8 Player of the Year (1992, 1993); 3x First-team All-Big 8 (1991–1993); Big 8 Freshman of the Year (1990); No. 51 retired by the University of Nebraska

Karen Jennings (born 1969 or 1970) is an American former basketball player who played with the Nebraska Cornhuskers women's basketball between 1990 and 1993 and set the record for the most career points for Nebraska with 2,405 points. She was the recipient of the 1993 Wade Trophy and was inducted into the University of Nebraska Athletics Hall of Fame in 2015. Jennings worked in sports medicine between 1998 and 2002, and then became a real estate agent.

== Early life and education ==
In 1970, Jennings was born in Persia, Iowa. During her childhood, she was diagnosed with scoliosis and started playing basketball. For her post-secondary education, Jennings graduated from the University of Nebraska–Lincoln in 1993 with a Bachelor of Science specializing in exercise physiology. She later attended the University of Nebraska Medical Center for a Master of Science in physical therapy and obtained her master's in 1998.

== Career ==
While at Nebraska, Jennings played on the Nebraska Cornhuskers women's basketball team from 1990 to 1993. As a forward with the Cornhuskers, Jennings scored 2,405 points and set the record for most career points at Nebraska. Jenning's jersey was retired after she completed her studies at Nebraska in 1993. After leaving Nebraska, Jennings played basketball in France from 1993 to 1994 before ending her basketball career to work in physical therapy.

After basketball, Jennings worked at the Methodist Hospital between 1998 and 2002 in the sports medicine department, and since 2002 works as a real estate agent in Omaha.

== Awards and honors ==
Jennings was the 1993 Wade Trophy recipient and inducted into the University of Nebraska Athletics Hall of Fame in 2015.

== Career statistics ==
Legend
GP	Games played	GS	Games started	MPG	Minutes per game	RPG	Rebounds per game
APG	Assists per game	SPG	Steals per game	BPG	Blocks per game	PPG	Points per game
TO	Turnovers per game	FG%	Field-goal percentage	3P%	3-point field-goal percentage	FT%	Free-throw percentage
**Bold**	Career best	°	League leader

=== College ===
Year	Team	GP	GS	MPG	FG%	3P%	FT%	RPG	APG	SPG	BPG	TO	PPG
1989–90	Nebraska	28	-	-	52.7	0.0	59.4	6.6	1.3	0.9	0.4	-	13.4
1990–91	Nebraska	28	-	-	57.1	0.0	74.5	8.9	**2.0**	1.5	0.4	-	20.5
1991–92	Nebraska	**32**	-	-	**60.3**	**35.0**	78.2	**10.0**	1.4	1.3	0.6	-	**25.3**
1992–93	Nebraska	31	-	-	55.0	31.3	**80.8**	8.0	1.5	**1.9**	**0.7**	-	20.9
**Career**		119	-	-	56.8	32.1	74.7	8.4	1.6	1.4	0.5	-	20.2
Statistics retrieved from Sports-Reference.

== Personal life ==
Jennings is married and has one child.
