= Jim Hartung =

American gymnast (1960–2026)

- Full name: James Nicholas Hartung
- Born: June 7, 1960 Omaha, Nebraska, U.S.
- Died: January 10, 2026 (aged 65) Lincoln, Nebraska, U.S.
- Height: 165 cm (5 ft 5 in)

Gymnastics career
- Discipline: Men's artistic gymnastics
- Country represented: United States
- College team: Nebraska Cornhuskers (1979–1982)
Medal record
Men's artistic gymnastics
Representing United States
Event	1st	2nd	3rd
Olympic Games	1	0	0
World Championships	0	0	1
Total	1	0	1
Olympic Games
Gold medal – first place	1984 Los Angeles	Team
World Championships
Bronze medal – third place	1979 Fort Worth	Team

James Nicholas Hartung (June 7, 1960 – January 10, 2026) was an American gymnast. He was a member of the United States men's national artistic gymnastics team and won a gold medal at the 1984 Summer Olympics.

== Early life, education, and high school success ==
Hartung was born in Omaha, Nebraska, on June 7, 1960 where he was also raised.. He was the son of James, a power company employee, and Karna (née Madsen), a homemaker, and was one of four children, with two brothers, John and Jeff, and one sister named Laura.

Hartung’s high school competitive record was prodigious. He won back-to-back Junior Olympic Sr. Nationals all-around titles in 1976 and 1977. He sheerly dominated the Nebraska State High School Championships three years in a row (1975-1977) where he took the all-around title all three years, and won at least 4 (of 6) apparatus titles all three of those years, as well.

He attended the University of Nebraska where he received a Bachelor’s Degree in Business in 1983.

== Senior gymnastics career ==
Hartung competed for the University of Nebraska–Lincoln and he also won five apparatus gold medals at the NCAA championships. In 1982, Hartung won the Nissen Award as the country's top gymnast. With his Cornhuskers team, he won four national championships in a row (1979-1982), and individually he won seven individual NCAA titles (which is still a record), including the coveted all-around title in 1981 and 1982. At the USAG national championships, Hartung won the all-around gold in 1981. Over several years, he collected 13 golds on apparatuses. He is also considered one of the best NCAA men's gymnasts of all time as the leader of the 5-time in a row winning Nebraska team and because of his record 22 All-Americans. Additionally, he is a three-time (1978, 1980, 1982) national Pommel Horse Champion and three-time (1980-1982) NCAA Rings Champion

Hartung was a member of the 1980 Olympic team but did not compete due to the U.S. boycott of the 1980 Summer Olympics in Moscow, USSR. As a consolation, he was one of 461 athletes to receive a Congressional Gold Medal many years later.

In 1984, he was a member of the gold-medal winning Olympic Team, which is, to date, the only Olympic Team Gold the USA men have ever won.. Going into the final rotation into the team competition, the USA men’s team was ahead of the defending World Champion Chinese team by a narrow margin of only six tenths of a point. This was a slim point advantage that some might have hoped to protect by executing their routines conservatively, but according to Hartung’s teammate, Silver medalist in the all-around at those Olympic, Peter Vidmar, Hartung spiritedly approached him and said "This is the Olympic Games — let’s go for it" despite competing on a swollen finger that he had dislocated during the US team’s recent Olympic trials.

=== Competitive consistency and dependability ===
Perhaps the quality most associated with Hartung’s career was his consistency and dependability. Coach for the 1984 Olympics USA Champion team, 8-time Pan-American Championships gold medalist and two-time Olympian Abie Grossfeld said of Hartung in 1984 "He was very consistent his whole career" and his 1984 Olympics teammate Peter Vidmar said he was "the backbone of the team in terms of dependability" and was "a loyal team player and as dependable as can be."

For seven years in a row (1978-1984), Hartung was an all-around medalist in at least one of the most prestigious domestic championships each year, either ending on the college level at the NCAA Championships or at the national level at the USA Championships on years where there was neither a World Championships nor Olympic Games, or continuing all the way through the World Championship or Olympic selection process, making every team with room to spare: (1978 – USA Championships and USA World Trials (3rd at both); 1979 – NCAA Championships (3rd) and USA Championships (2nd); 1980 – NCAA Championships (1st) and USA Championships and USA Olympic Trials (2nd at both); 1981 – USA Championships, NCAA Championships and USA World Trials (1st at all 3); 1982 – NCAA Championships (2nd) and USA Championships (3rd); 1983 – USA Championships and Worlds Trials (3rd at both); and 1984 – USA Championships (3rd)).

Probably Hartung's competitive peak was in 1981 and 1982. In 1981, he won the all-around title at the 1981 USA Championships, NCAA Championships, and USA World Championship trials, as referenced above. At the 1981 USA Championships, his dominance extended into the apparatus finals where he won 3 of 6 gold medals (Floor exercise, Rings, Parallel Bars) and one bronze (Horizontal bar). The next year at the 1982 USA Championships, a particularly low score of 8.600 marred his all-around competitive 12-event score, placing him in 3rd overall, however he came back in the apparatus finals to take 4 of 6 gold medals (Floor exercise, Pommel horse, Rings, Vault) in a competitive field that included eventual individual Olympic Champions Vidmar and Mitch Gaylord.

At the level of the World Championships and Olympic Games, Hartung was never quite a standout individual star (although he logged two respectable top-15 finishes at two different World Championships (1979 and 1981 respectively) and made a couple of event finals), but his consistency and dependability helped ensure results of historic proportions for his USA team at both of those levels of competition. At the 1979 World Championships in Fort Worth, Texas, his 12-event total of 116.20 was the 3rd highest on his 6-person team which was a crucial part of helping ensure that his USA team won their first-ever World Championship team medal (by and including that edition of the World Championships, which is officially numbered as the 20th edition, they had existed for 76 years). Also, at the 1981 World Championships, his 12-event total of 115.75 placed him 3rd on his 5-member team (which placed 5th) and at the 1983 World Championships, his 12-event total of 116.40 placed him 4th on his 6-member team (which placed 4th). The culmination of his career was, of course, at the 1984 Los Angeles Summer Olympics where he helped his team to their historic Gold medal with his trademark consistency and dependability by logging, among his 12 performances, no score lower than a 9.7 - a feat shared, on his team, only by Bart Conner and Peter Vidmar.

== Post-competitive career and later life ==
After gymnastics, Hartung became a high-level gymnastics judge. From 1988 until at least 2007, he was a coach of the USA National team. From 2006, he was an assistant coach of the men's gymnastics team at the University of Nebraska–Lincoln.

Hartung died at his home in Lincoln, Nebraska, on January 10, 2026, at the age of 65. His death, due to heart attack, was preceded by a 15-year battle with neck cancer that eventually claimed his voice due to the damage it inflicted upon his esophagus and lungs, which fact he transcended within his coaching career. He initially felt the cancerous bump during the 2010 World Championships and was diagnosed days later.

He was preceded in death by both of his parents and is survived by all of his siblings and children and his former wife Lisa (née Bollinger).

== Accolades, awards and honors ==
Within a couple of days after Hartung’s death, the University of Nebraska’s Athletics department memorialized him in an official statement by saying "Jim is a true Husker legend and his impact on the sport of gymnastics will carry on for decades to come." Chuck Chmelka, Head Coach for the University of Nebraska's head gymnastics coach at the time of his death, said "He was the toughest man I knew".

Hartung entered the U.S. Gymnastics Hall of Fame as a member of the gold medal Olympic team in 1984 and then in 1997 as an individual. In 2006, he and his 1984 teammates were inducted into the U.S. Olympic Hall of Fame. Hartung was inducted into the Nebraska High School Hall of Fame in its very first year (1994).. He was also a member of the Nebraska Athletics Hall of Fame (inducted in 2015), and was a part of the first College Gymnastics Association Hall of Fame Class in 2024.
