= Phil Cahoy =

American gymnast, orthopedist

- Full name: Philip Cahoy, Jr.

Gymnastics career
- Country represented: United States
- College team: Nebraska Cornhuskers

Philip Cahoy, Jr. is a retired American gymnast. He was a member of the United States men's national artistic gymnastics team.

== Gymnastics career ==
Cahoy was a member of the 1980 Olympic team but did not compete because of the boycott. He participated in the 1984 Olympic trials but was hindered by injuries. A competitive attempt in 1988 was also unsuccessful because of injury.

Cahoy was a regular member of three World gymnastics teams: 1978, 1981, and 1985. He was an alternate for the 1983 squad. In 1986, he attended the Goodwill Games, where he came in fourth on pommel horse and sixth on parallel bars.

== Personal life ==
Following his retirement from gymnastics, Cahoy became a doctor and spent time working with the Kansas City Chiefs.
