= List of Olympic male artistic gymnasts for the United States =

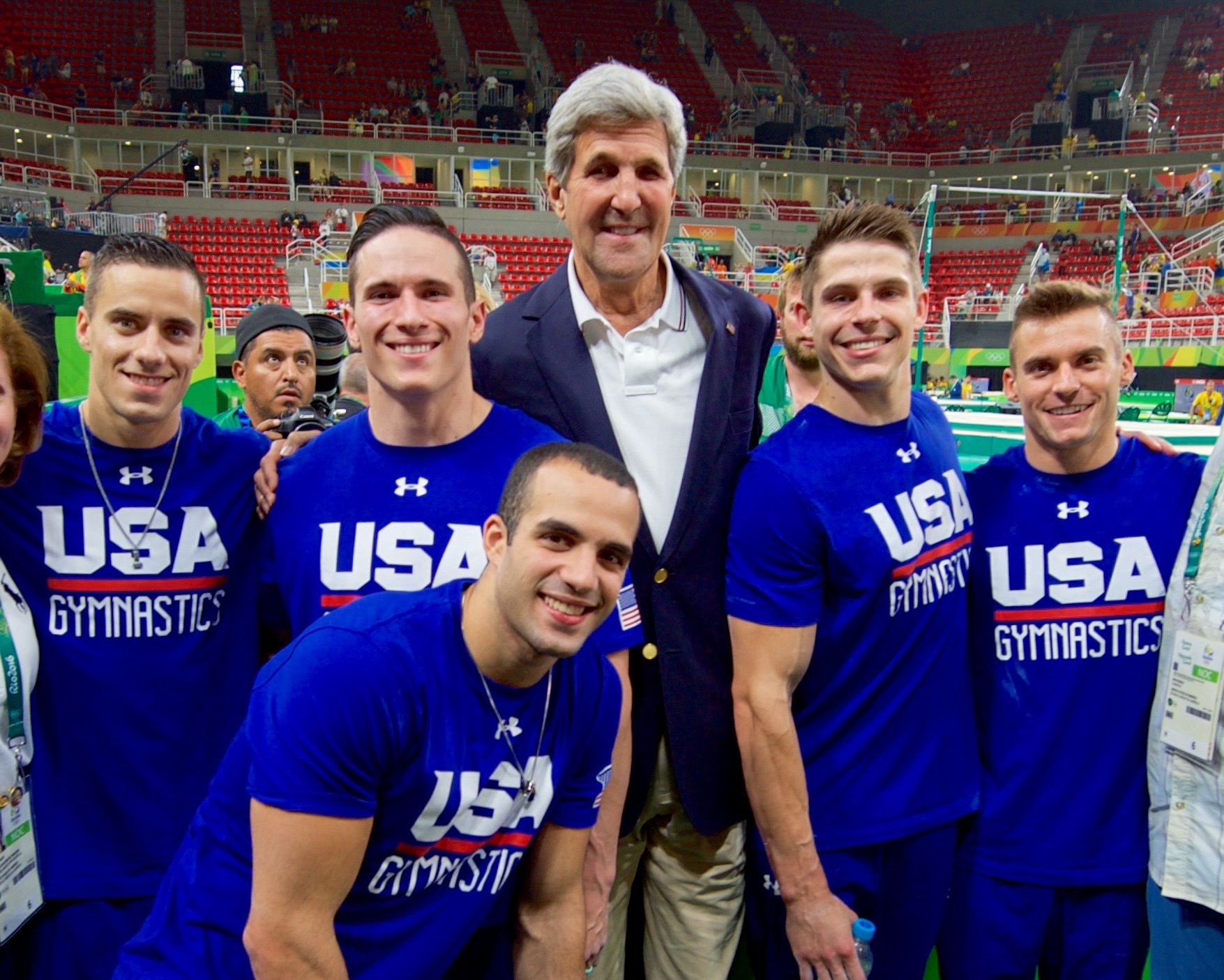
The 2016 Olympic team

American male artistic gymnasts have competed at every Olympic Games since 1904, except for 1908, 1912, and 1980. In total, there have been 223 American male gymnasts who have competed at the Olympics.

== History ==
Over 100 athletes competed at the 1904 Olympics, and American teams won the gold, silver, and bronze in the team all-around and a total of 30 medals across all of the events. The United States returned to men's gymnastics at the 1920 Olympics, but did not win any medals. At the 1924 Olympics, Frank Kriz won the gold medal on the vault. At the 1932 Olympics, the men's team won the silver medal behind Italy. The next medal by an American man was not won until 1976 when Peter Kormann won the bronze medal on the floor exercise. At the 1984 Summer Olympics, the United States team won the gold medal. Additionally, the 1984 Olympic team won seven individual medals. At the 1992 Olympics, Trent Dimas won the gold medal on the horizontal bar. Then at the 1996 Summer Olympics, Jair Lynch won the silver medal on the parallel bars. The men's team won the silver medal behind Japan at the 2004 Summer Olympics. Additionally, Paul Hamm won the gold medal in the all-around as well as the silver medal on the horizontal bar. At the 2008 Olympics, the men's team won the bronze medal, and Jonathan Horton won the silver medal on the horizontal bar. Danell Leyva won the bronze medal in the all-around at the 2012 Olympics. Leyva also won the silver medal on the parallel bars and the horizontal bar at the 2016 Summer Olympics. Additionally, Alex Naddour won the bronze medal on the pommel horse.

== Gymnasts ==
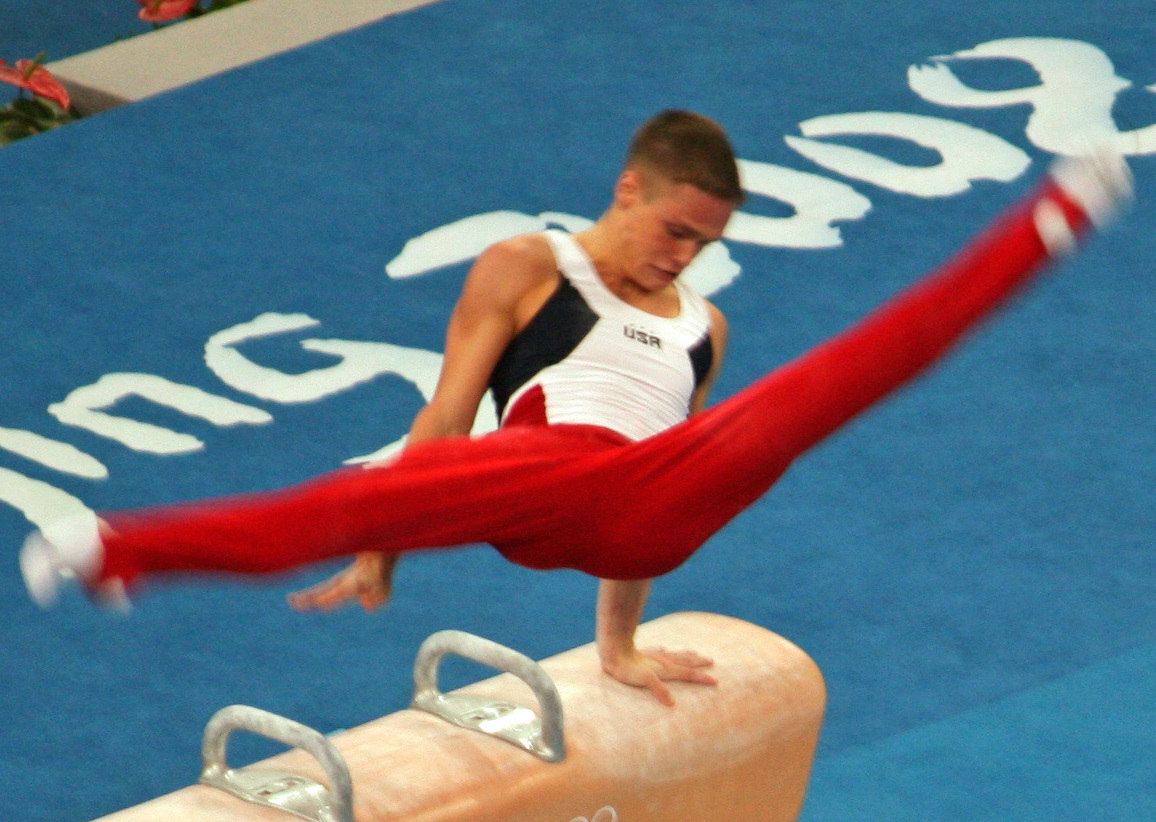
Alexander Artemev

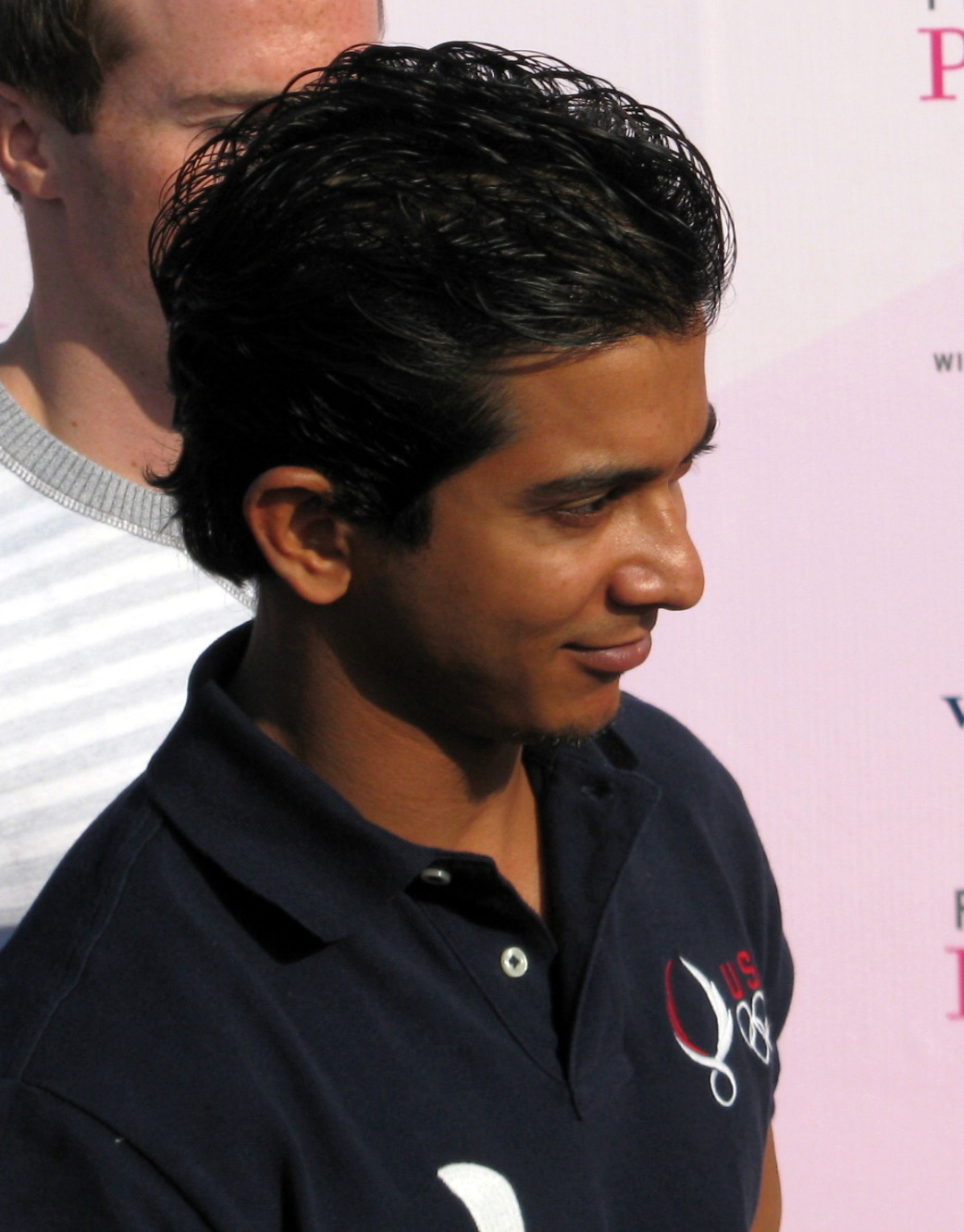
Raj Bhavsar

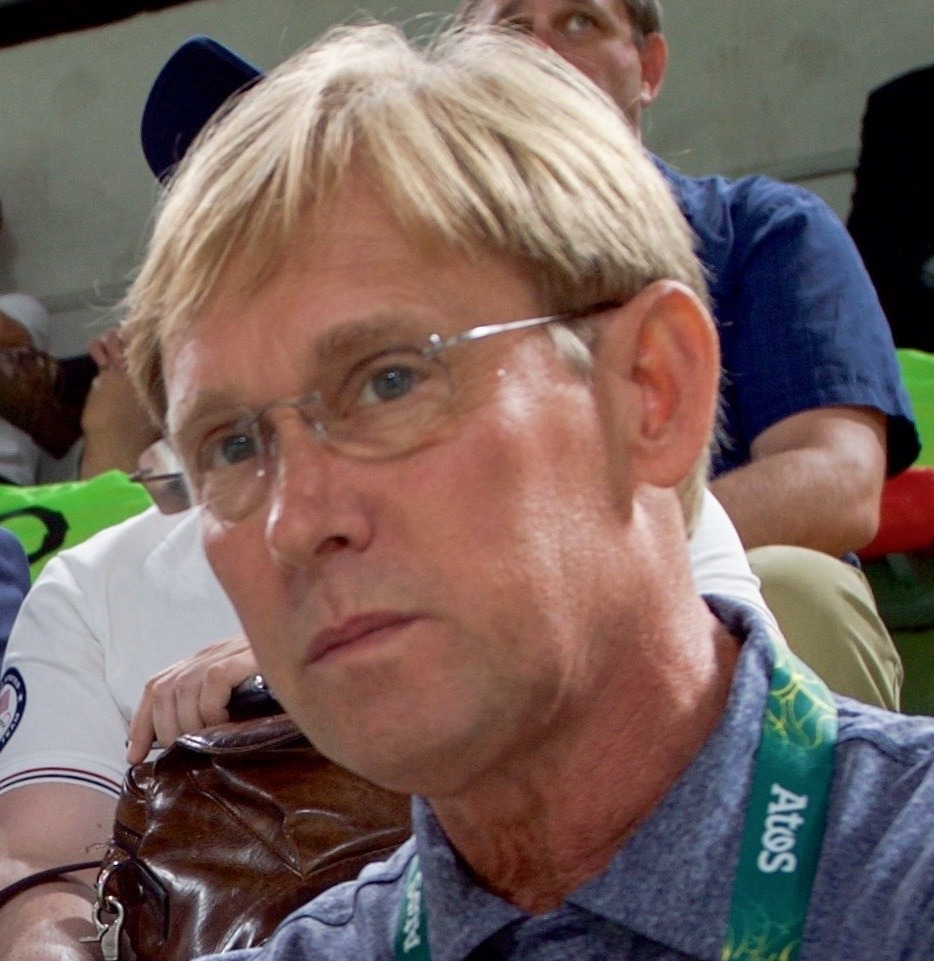
Bart Conner

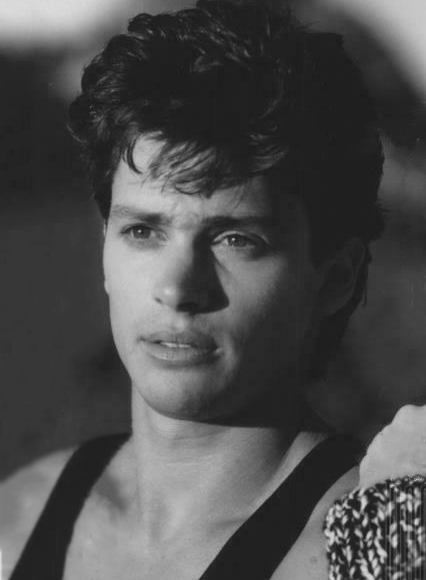
Mitch Gaylord

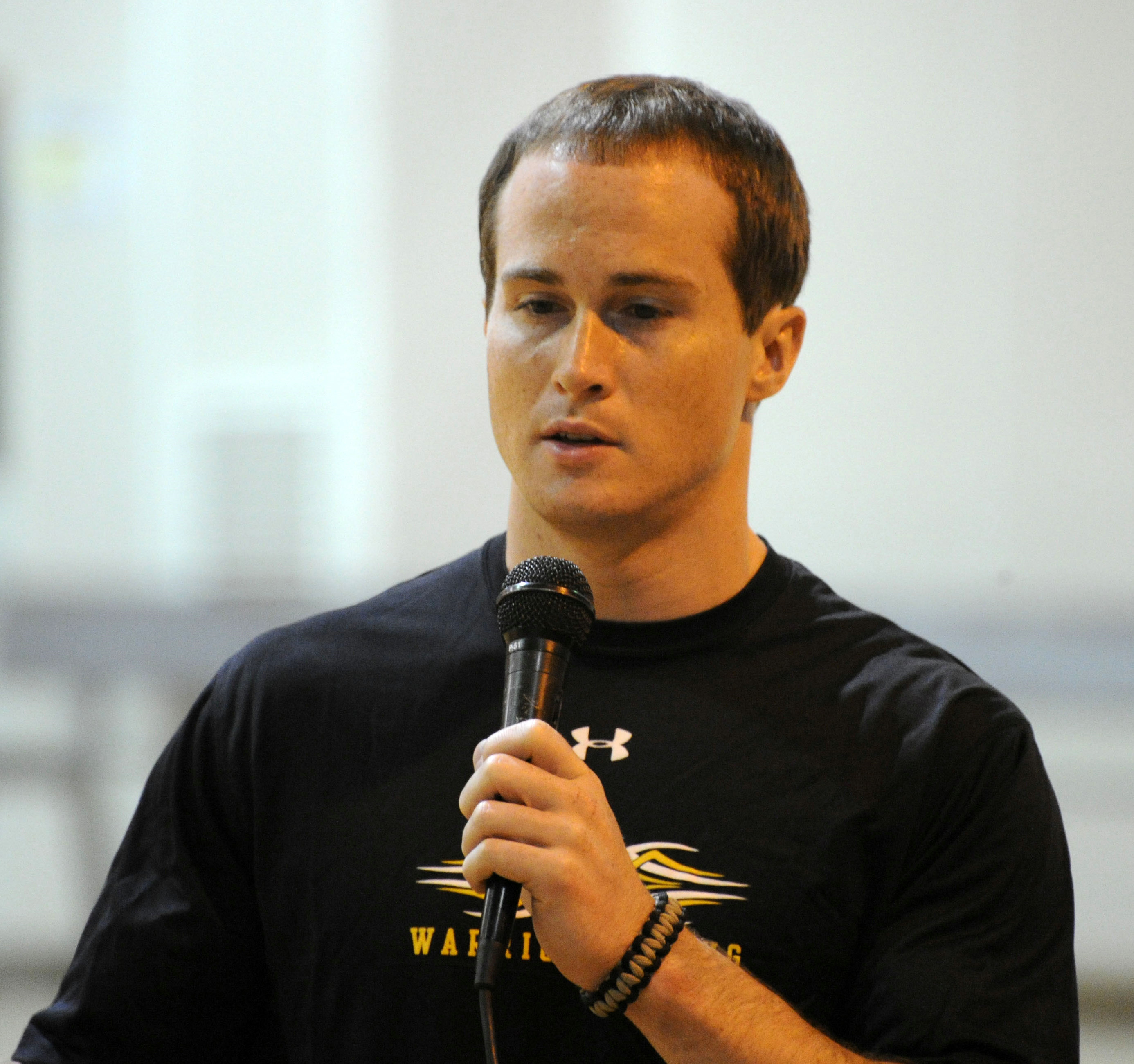
Paul Hamm

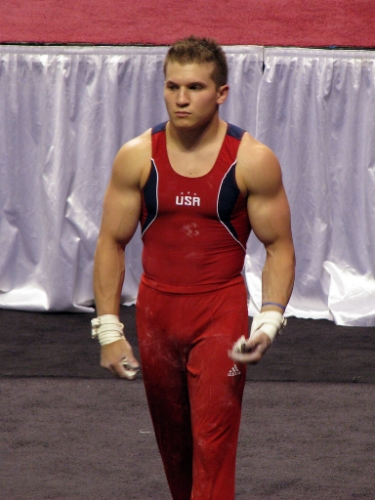
Jonathan Horton

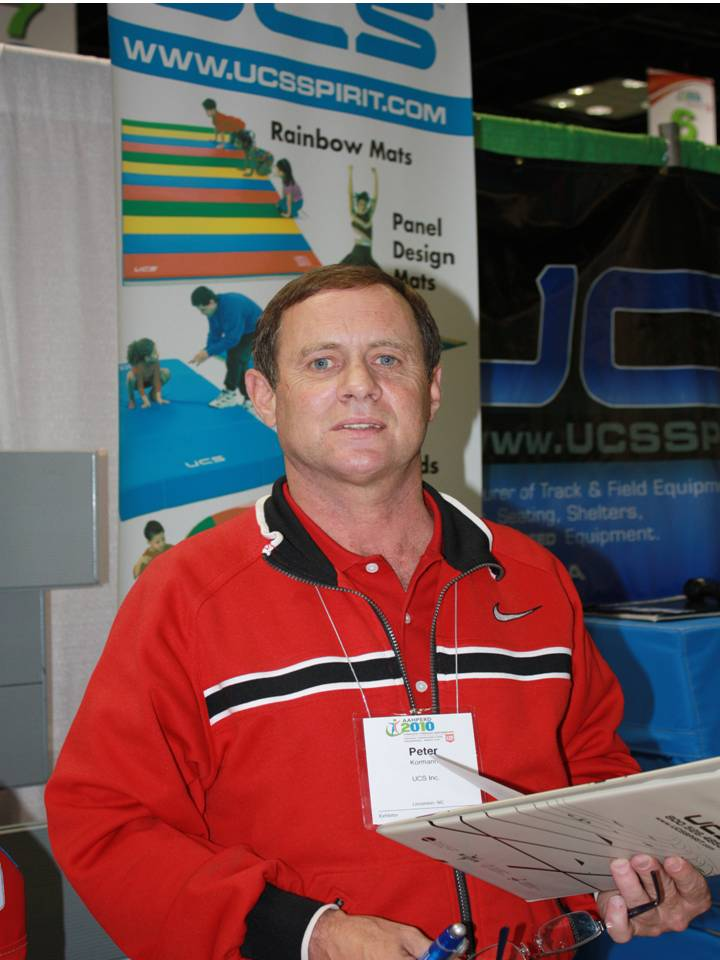
Peter Kormann

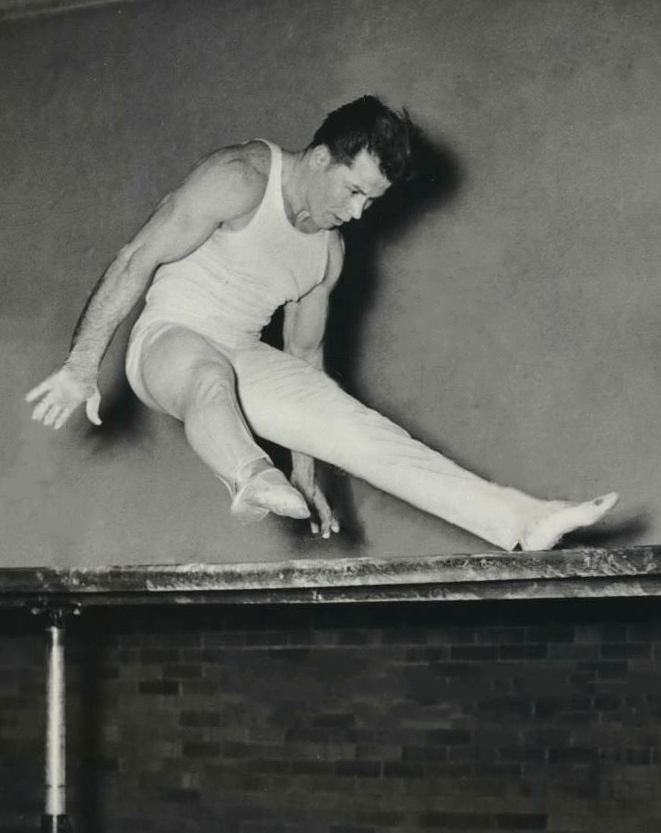
Joe Kotys

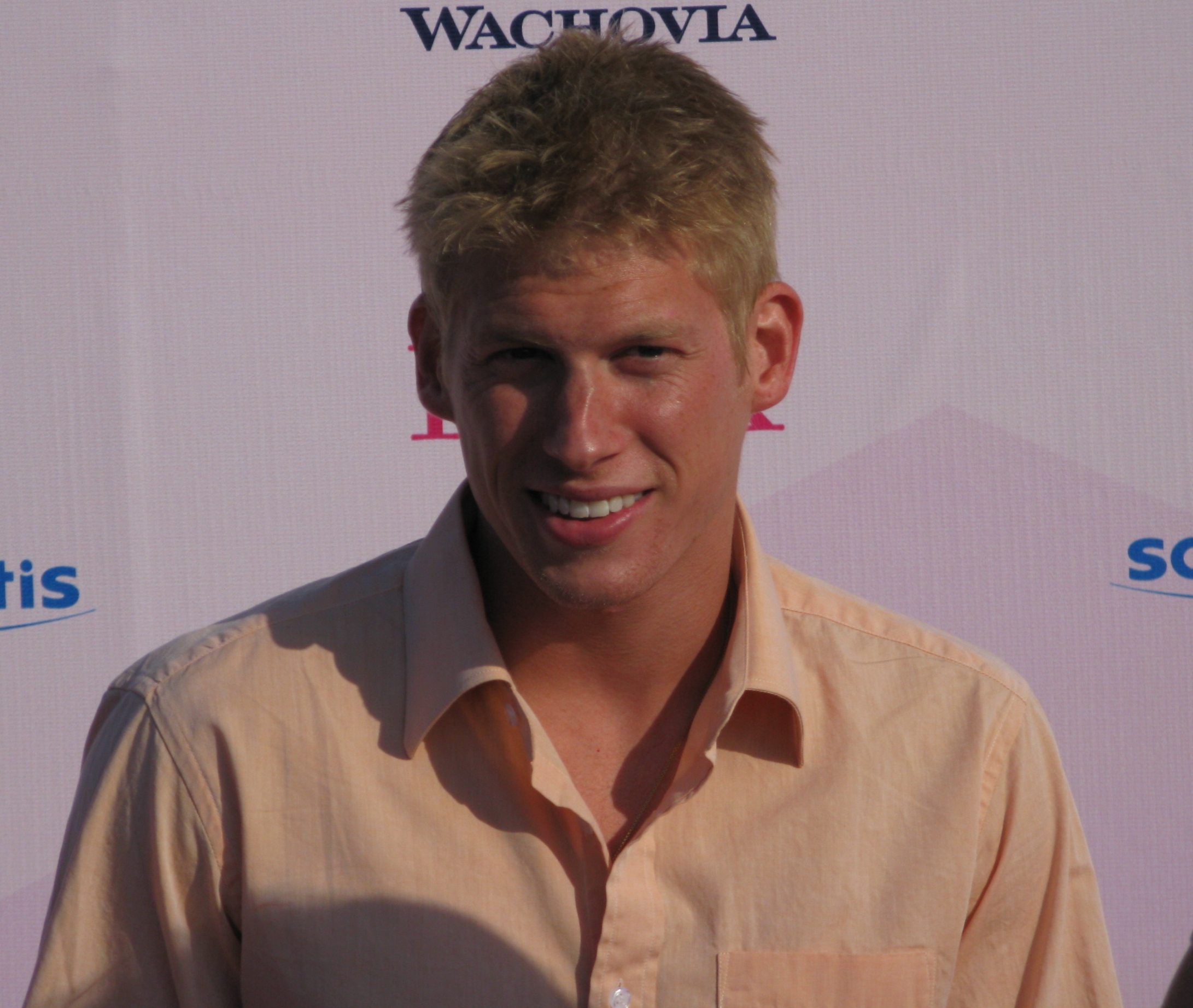
Justin Spring

Gymnast	Years	Gold	Silver	Bronze	Total medals	Ref.
Kanati Allen	1968	0	0	0	0	
Alexander Artemev	2008	0	0	1	1	
Marshall Avener	1972, 1976	0	0	0	0	
Mihai Bagiu	1996	0	0	0	0	
Larry Banner	1960, 1964	0	0	0	0	
Ron Barak	1964	0	0	0	0	
Raymond Bass	1932	1	0	0	1	
Tom Beach	1976	0	0	0	0	
Dick Beckner	1956	0	0	0	0	
Jack Beckner	1952, 1956, 1960	0	0	0	0	
Glenn Berry	1928	0	0	0	0	
Raj Bhavsar	2008	0	0	1	1	
Richard Bishop	1932	0	0	0	0	
Dallas Bixler	1932	1	0	0	1	
William Bonsall	1948	0	0	0	0	
Louis Bordo	1948	0	0	0	0	
Walter Blattmann	1952	0	0	0	0	
Chris Brooks	2016	0	0	0	0	
Ed Carmichael	1932	0	0	1	1	
Steve Cohen	1968	0	0	0	0	
Bart Conner	1976, 1984	2	0	0	2	
Jim Culhane	1972	0	0	0	0	
John Crosby	1972	0	0	0	0	
William Galbraith	1932	0	1	0	1	
Frank Cumiskey	1932, 1936, 1948	0	1	0	1	
Bill Denton	1932	0	1	0	1	
Tom Connolly	1932	0	0	1	1	
Tim Daggett	1984	1	0	1	2	
Jake Dalton	2012, 2016	0	0	0	0	
Kevin Davis	1988	0	0	0	0	
Vincent D'Autorio	1948, 1952	0	0	0	0	
Trent Dimas	1992	1	0	0	1	
Phil Erenberg	1932	0	1	0	1	
Sid Freudenstein	1968	0	0	0	0	
Jason Gatson	2004	0	1	0	1	
Mitch Gaylord	1984	1	1	2	4	
George Greenfield	1972	0	0	0	0	
Marcel Gleyre	1932	0	0	0	0	
Kenny Griffin	1936	0	0	0	0	
Ed Gross	1932	0	1	0	1	
Abie Grossfeld	1956, 1960	0	0	0	0	
George Gulack	1932	1	0	0	1	
Joseph Hagerty	2008	0	0	1	1	
Morgan Hamm	2000, 2004	0	1	0	1	
Paul Hamm	2000, 2004	1	2	0	3	
Jim Hartung	1984	1	0	0	1	
Frank Haubold	1928, 1932, 1936	0	1	1	2	
William Herrmann	1932	0	0	1	1	
Don Holder	1952	0	0	0	0	
Asher Hong	2024	0	0	1	1	
Jonathan Horton	2008, 2012	0	1	1	2	
Steve Hug	1968, 1972	0	0	0	0	
Al Jochim	1924, 1928, 1932, 1936	0	2	0	2	
Scott Johnson	1984	1	0	0	1	
Barney Jorgensen	1920	0	0	0	0	
Paul Juda	2024	0	0	1	1	
Scott Keswick	1992	0	0	0	0	
Paul Krempel	1920, 1928	0	0	0	0	
Peter Kormann	1976	0	0	1	1	
Joe Kotys	1948	0	0	0	0	
Frank Kriz	1920, 1924, 1928	1	0	0	1	
William Kuhlemeier	1932	0	0	1	1	
Charles Lakes	1988	0	0	0	0	
Danell Leyva	2012, 2016	0	2	1	3	
Jair Lynch	1992, 1996	0	1	0	1	
John Macready	1996	0	0	0	0	
John Mais	1920, 1924	0	0	0	0	
Brody Malone	2020, 2024	0	0	1	1	
Stephen McCain	2000	0	0	0	0	
Brett McClure	2004	0	1	0	1	
Fred Meyer	1932, 1936	0	1	0	1	
Sam Mikulak	2012, 2016, 2020	0	0	0	0	
Dominick Minicucci	1988, 1992	0	0	0	0	
Rusty Mitchell	1964	0	0	0	0	
Yul Moldauer	2020	0	0	0	0	
Alex Naddour	2016	0	0	1	1	
Stephen Nedoroscik	2024	0	0	2	2	
Harold Newhart	1928	0	0	0	0	
Rudolph Novak	1924	0	0	0	0	
Fred Orlofsky	1960	0	0	0	0	
John Orozco	2012	0	0	0	0	
Gar O'Quinn	1960	0	0	0	0	
John Pearson	1924, 1928	0	0	0	0	
Chet Phillips	1936	0	0	0	0	
Artie Pitt	1936	0	0	0	0	
Fred Richard	2024	0	0	1	1	
Lance Ringnald	1988	0	0	0	0	
Fred Roethlisberger	1968	0	0	0	0	
George Roth	1932	1	0	0	1	
Curt Rottman	1924	0	0	0	0	
John Roethlisberger	1992, 1996, 2000	0	0	0	0	
Bill Roetzheim	1948, 1952	0	0	0	0	
Frank Safanda	1924	0	0	0	0	
Makoto Sakamoto	1964, 1972	0	0	0	0	
Ed Scrobe	1948, 1952	0	0	0	0	
Michael Schuler	1932	0	1	0	1	
Art Shurlock	1964	0	0	0	0	
Kip Simons	1996	0	0	0	0	
Charles Simms	1952, 1956	0	0	0	0	
Ray Sorensen	1948	0	0	0	0	
Justin Spring	2008	0	0	1	1	
Bob Stout	1952	0	0	0	0	
Wes Suter	1988	0	0	0	0	
Kevin Tan	2008	0	0	1	1	
Kurt Thomas	1976	0	0	0	0	
Dave Thor	1968	0	0	0	0	
Bill Tom	1956	0	0	0	0	
Don Tonry	1960	0	0	0	0	
Sean Townsend	2000	0	0	0	0	
Chainey Umphrey	1996	0	0	0	0	
Peter Vidmar	1984	2	1	0	3	
Armando Vega	1956	0	0	0	0	
Chris Waller	1992	0	0	0	0	
Max Wandrer	1924	0	0	0	0	
Greg Weiss	1964	0	0	0	0	
George Wheeler	1936	0	0	0	0	
Blaine Wilson	1996, 2000, 2004	0	1	0	1	
Shane Wiskus	2020	0	0	0	0	
Herman Witzig	1928	0	0	0	0	
Rowland Wolfe	1932	1	0	0	1	
Alec Yoder	2020	0	0	0	0	
Guard Young	2004	0	1	0	1	
Wayne Young	1976	0	0	0	0	

== Medalists ==
Medal	Name	Year	Event
Gold	Frank Kriz	(France) 1924 Paris	Men's vault
Silver	Haubold, Cumiskey, Jochim, Meyer, Schuler	(United States) 1932 Los Angeles	Men's team
Bronze	Frank Haubold	(United States) 1932 Los Angeles	Men's pommel horse
Gold	George Gulack	(United States) 1932 Los Angeles	Men's rings
Silver	Bill Denton	(United States) 1932 Los Angeles	Men's rings
Silver	Al Jochim	(United States) 1932 Los Angeles	Men's vault
Bronze	Ed Carmichael	(United States) 1932 Los Angeles	Men's rings
Gold	Dallas Bixler	(United States) 1932 Los Angeles	Men's horizontal bar
Gold	George Roth	(United States) 1932 Los Angeles	Men's Indian clubs
Silver	Philip Erenberg	(United States) 1932 Los Angeles	Men's Indian clubs
Bronze	William Kuhlemeier	(United States) 1932 Los Angeles	Men's Indian clubs
Gold	Raymond Bass	(United States) 1932 Los Angeles	Men's rope climbing
Silver	William Galbraith	(United States) 1932 Los Angeles	Men's rope climbing
Bronze	Thomas Connolly	(United States) 1932 Los Angeles	Men's rope climbing
Gold	Rowland Wolfe	(United States) 1932 Los Angeles	Men's tumbling
Silver	Ed Gross	(United States) 1932 Los Angeles	Men's tumbling
Bronze	William Herrmann	(United States) 1932 Los Angeles	Men's tumbling
Bronze	Peter Kormann	(Canada) 1976 Montreal	Men's floor exercise
Gold	Conner, Daggett, Gaylord, Hartung, Johnson, Vidmar	(United States) 1984 Los Angeles	Men's team
Silver	Peter Vidmar	(United States) 1984 Los Angeles	Men's all-around
Gold	Peter Vidmar	(United States) 1984 Los Angeles	Men's pommel horse
Bronze	Tim Daggett	(United States) 1984 Los Angeles	Men's pommel horse
Bronze	Mitch Gaylord	(United States) 1984 Los Angeles	Men's rings
Silver	Mitch Gaylord	(United States) 1984 Los Angeles	Men's vault
Gold	Bart Conner	(United States) 1984 Los Angeles	Men's parallel bars
Bronze	Mitch Gaylord	(United States) 1984 Los Angeles	Men's parallel bars
Gold	Trent Dimas	(Spain) 1992 Barcelona	Men's horizontal bar
Silver	Jair Lynch	(United States) 1996 Atlanta	Men's parallel bars
Silver	Gatson, M. Hamm, P. Hamm, McClure, Wilson, Young	(Greece) 2004 Athens	Men's team
Gold	Paul Hamm	(Greece) 2004 Athens	Men's all-around
Silver	Paul Hamm	(Greece) 2004 Athens	Men's horizontal bar
Bronze	Artemev, Bhavsar, Hagerty, Horton, Spring, Tan	(China) 2008 Beijing	Men's team
Silver	Jonathan Horton	(China) 2008 Beijing	Men's horizontal bar
Bronze	Danell Leyva	(United Kingdom) 2012 London	Men's all-around
Bronze	Alexander Naddour	(Brazil) 2016 Rio de Janeiro	Men's pommel horse
Silver	Danell Leyva	(Brazil) 2016 Rio de Janeiro	Men's parallel bars
Silver	Danell Leyva	(Brazil) 2016 Rio de Janeiro	Men's horizontal bar
Bronze	Hong, Juda, Malone, Nedoroscik, Richard	(France) 2024 Paris	Men's team
Bronze	Stephen Nedoroscik	(France) 2024 Paris	Men's pommel horse

== See also ==
- List of Olympic female artistic gymnasts for the United States
