= Michael Ashe =

American artistic gymnast

- Full name: Michael Brandon Ashe
- Born: March 14, 1981 (age 45) Spartanburg, South Carolina, U.S.
- Height: 5 ft 8 in (173 cm)

Gymnastics career
- Discipline: Men's artistic gymnastics
- Country represented: United States
- College team: California Golden Bears (2000–2004)
- Gym: Atlanta School of Gymnastics; Greenville Gymnastics Center
- Head coach: Barry Weiner
- Assistant coaches: Evgenii Zherebchevskiy; Kip Simons
- Retired: c. 2003
Medal record
Men's artistic gymnastics
Representing United States
Event	1st	2nd	3rd
Pan American Games	0	1	0
Total	0	1	0
Pan American Games
Silver medal – second place	1999 Winnipeg	Team

Michael Brandon Ashe (born March 14, 1981) is a retired American artistic gymnast. He was a member of the United States men's national artistic gymnastics team and won a silver medal at the 1999 Pan American Games. He competed collegiately for the California Golden Bears men's gymnastics team and was a two-time NCAA national champion on the horizontal bar.

== Early life and education ==
Ashe was born on March 14, 1981, to Frances and Terry Ashe in Spartanburg, South Carolina. He trained at Greenville Gymnastics Center, then later at the Atlanta School of Gymnastics. His hometown is Stone Mountain, Georgia, and he attended Stephenson High School where he played high school basketball and baseball. He later enrolled at the University of California, Berkeley to pursue gymnastics.

== Gymnastics career ==
Ashe was a California Golden Bears men's gymnastics team member. He was the back-to-back NCAA horizontal champion at the 2000 and 2001 NCAA Men's Gymnastics Championships.

On the international stage, Ashe represented the United States at the 1999 Pan American Games and won a silver medal in the team all-around.

Following his retirement, Ashe began coaching gymnastics in 2003. Additionally, he judges gymnastics and was named the 2013 National Judge of the Year for the Western region of the National Gymnastics Judges Association. He was a judge at the 2014 Summer Youth Olympics.
