= Scott Keswick =

American gymnast (born 1970)

- Full name: Scott A. Keswick
- Born: March 3, 1970 (age 56) Washington, D.C., U.S.
- Height: 162 cm (5 ft 4 in)

Gymnastics career
- Discipline: Men's artistic gymnastics
- Country represented: United States; (1990–1996)
- College team: UCLA Bruins
- Head coach: Art Shurlock
- Former coach: Yefim Furman
- Retired: July 1996
Medal record
Men's artistic gymnastics
Representing United States
Event	1st	2nd	3rd
Goodwill Games	0	0	2
Total	0	0	2
Goodwill Games
Bronze medal – third place	1994 Saint Petersburg	Team
Bronze medal – third place	1994 Saint Petersburg	Rings
- Awards: Nissen-Emery Award (1992)

Scott A. Keswick (born March 3, 1970) is a retired American gymnast. He was a member of the United States men's national artistic gymnastics team and competed in the 1992 Olympic Games.

== Early life and education ==
Keswick was born on March 3, 1970, in Washington, DC. The son of an Air Force sergeant, Keswick moved around as a child. He considers Las Vegas his hometown.

Keswick first became interested in gymnastics when he was seven years old and living in Iran while his father was stationed there. He was instructed on trampoline by local coaches (few Iranians were gymnasts). They noticed his talent and suggested he train for the sport when he returned to the United States.

He graduated from Las Vegas High School and later enrolled at the University of California, Los Angeles to pursue gymnastics.

== Gymnastics career ==
Keswick participated in the 1985 Junior Olympics and earned a bronze in the all-around, a gold on parallel bars, and a silver on vault. At the 1987 Junior Olympics, he won gold in the all-around, still rings, vault, and parallel bars, and a bronze on the floor.

Keswick competed for UCLA from 1988 to 1992, earning eight all-Americans. For his first two years, he overlapped with teammate Chris Waller, who also participated in the 1992 Olympics. As a freshman, Keswick won the Nissen Award.

He retired in July 1996 following the 1996 United States Olympic trials after not being selected for the 1996 Summer Olympics team.
