= Raj Bhavsar =

American artistic gymnast

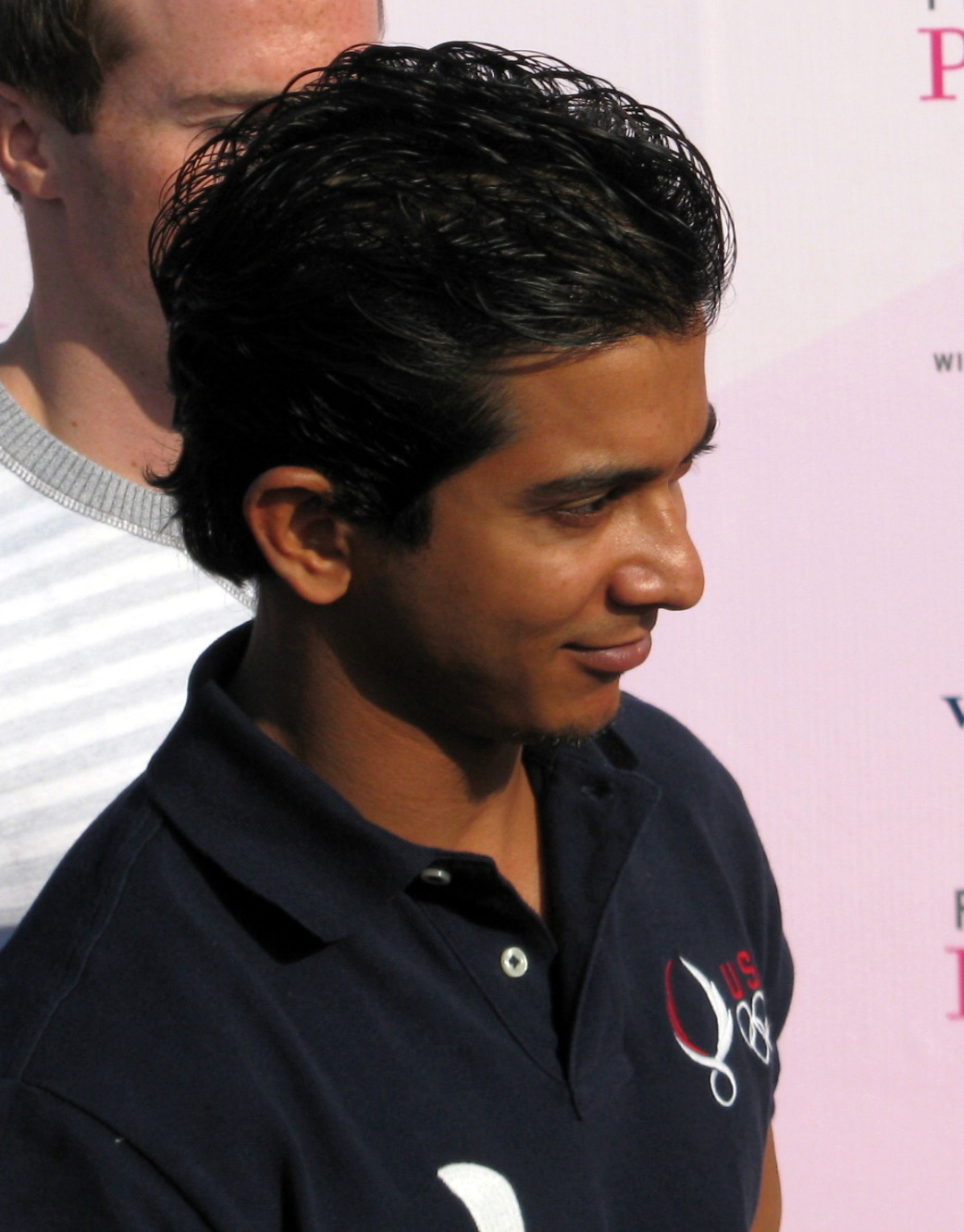
- Bhavsar in 2008

Personal information
- Full name: Stephen Raj Bhavsar
- Born: September 7, 1980 (age 46) Houston, Texas, U.S.
- Height: 1.69 m (5 ft 7 in)
- Relatives: Akash Modi (cousin)

Gymnastics career
- Discipline: Men's artistic gymnastics
- Country represented: United States; (2001–2009)
- College team: Ohio State Buckeyes (2000–2003)
- Gym: Houston Gymnastics Academy; Team Chevron; Cypress Academy
- Head coach: Kevin Mazekia
- Former coach: Miles Avery
- Eponymous skills: Bhavsar (parallel bars)
- Retired: c. 2010
Medal record
Men's artistic gymnastics
Representing United States
Event	1st	2nd	3rd
Olympic Games	0	0	1
World Championships	0	2	0
Pan American Games	0	1	0
Pacific Rim Championships	1	0	0
Total	1	3	1
Olympic Games
Bronze medal – third place	2008 Beijing	Team
World Championships
Silver medal – second place	2001 Ghent	Team
Silver medal – second place	2003 Anaheim	Team
Pan American Games
Silver medal – second place	1999 Winnipeg	Team
Pacific Rim Championships
Gold medal – first place	2008 San Jose	Team

Stephen Raj Bhavsar (born September 7, 1980) is an American artistic gymnast. He was a member of the United States men's national artistic gymnastics team and competed at the 2001 and 2003 World Championships U.S. team. He earned a bronze medal as a member of the 2008 U.S. Olympic Team. He was originally an alternate but was named to the team following the injury withdrawal of Paul Hamm. At the Games, Bhavsar earned a bronze medal with the U.S. team in Artistic Gymnastics with teammates Alexander Artemev, Joey Hagerty, Jonathan Horton, Justin Spring, and Kai Wen Tan. He was a contender for the 2004 Olympic Team and was named as an alternate.

== Early life and education ==
Raj Bhavsar is a Gujarati. He is the son of Jyotindra and Surekha Bhavsar. His father is from Vadodara, Gujarat, and his mother was born in Kampala, Uganda but educated in Gujarat. He was born in Houston. He was raised in Greater Houston and attended Bear Creek Elementary, Wolfe Elementary, Mayde Creek Junior High, and Mayde Creek High School. During this time he trained at Cypress Academy of Gymnastics under his coach Bill Foster.

== Gymnastics career ==
Bhavsar was a member of the United States team at the 2001 World Artistic Gymnastics Championships and won a silver medal for the team all-around. He won a second silver medal for the team all-around at the 2003 World Artistic Gymnastics Championships.

He attended Ohio State University and won the NCAA title with the Ohio State Buckeyes men's gymnastics team. He won the All-Around at the 2002 NCAA Championships.

At the 2004 Olympic Trials, he was in contention for the U.S. Olympic Team. He was named as an alternate. In 2004 he was first in the rings in the trials, and fourth overall in the national championships, yet was passed over. In 2008 he was third in the Olympic trials and the Visa Championships and again wound up an alternate to the 6-man team. This was because his strongest events overlapped with those of Paul Hamm and Morgan Hamm, and the team needed gymnasts who were stronger in other disciplines. After Paul Hamm was injured, Bhavsar was selected for the team and earned a bronze medal.

Bhavsar was still training competitively in December 2009 to compete at the 2010 Winter Cup, but he did not compete at the competition. It was announced in 2010 that Bhavsar had retired.

== Personal life ==
After achieving his goals as an Olympic gymnast, in 2010 Bhavsar started working for Cirque du Soleil as an artist for their performance show Iris which debuted in July 2011. His cousin, Akash Modi, was also a member of the United States men's national artistic gymnastics team.

He coached Jeremy Bischoff at Waller's Gymjam Academy.

== Eponymous skills ==
Bhavsar currently has one named element on the parallel bars and one formerly named element on the rings.

Gymnastics elements named after Raj Bhavsar
Apparatus	Name	Description	Difficulty (Note: Valid for the 2025–2028 Code of Points)	Added to Code of Points
Parallel bars	Bhavsar	"Swing forward, straddle cut backward, and regrasp with straight body at horizontal."	E, 0.5	2009. Performed at the 2009 Moscow World Stars
Rings	Bhavsar	"Pull with straight body and arms through moment. front lever to swallow (2s.)."	Removed from CoP on December 31, 2021.	2001
