= Frank Kriz =

American artistic gymnast (1894–1955)

Personal information
- Full name: Frank Josef Kriz
- Born: March 26, 1894 Manhattan, New York, U.S.
- Died: January 11, 1955 (aged 60) Manhattan, New York, U.S.
- Height: 172 cm (5 ft 8 in)

Gymnastics career
- Discipline: Men's artistic gymnastics
- Country represented: United States
- Gym: Bohemian Gymnastic Association
Medal record
Men's artistic gymnastics
Representing United States
Event	1st	2nd	3rd
Olympic Games	1	0	0
Total	1	0	0
Olympic Games
Gold medal – first place	1924 Paris	Vault

Frank Josef Kriz (March 26, 1894 – January 11, 1955) was an American gymnast and Olympic champion. A was a member of the New York Sokol and the Bohemian Gymnastic Association. He was a member of the United States men's national artistic gymnastics team and competed in the 1920, 1924, and 1928 Summer Olympics. In 1924, he received a gold medal in vault. In 1922 and 1924, he won the Amateur Athletic Union national gymnastics title. In 1959, he was one of the initial inductees to the USA Gymnastics Hall of Fame.

As a gymnast, Kriz was a member of the Bohemian Gymnastic Association. He worked as a fireman for Hook and Ladder 154 of the New York City Fire Department and required leave to participate in the Olympics. He received special approval, along with Bob McAllister, to make the trip to compete in the 1928 Summer Olympics.

Kriz was the very first U.S. gymnast, male or female, to win a medal of any sort at a Summer Olympic Games or World Championships on foreign soil, and would remain the only one to win any individual medal at those such games on foreign soil for nearly half a century until Cathy Rigby won a silver on balance beam at the 1970 World Championships in Ljubljana and Peter Kormann won a bronze medal on floor exercise at the 1976 Montreal Summer Olympic Games.
