= Walter Blattmann =

American gymnast

- Full name: Walter Conrad Blattmann
- Born: June 23, 1920 New Orleans, Louisiana, U.S.
- Died: April 10, 2000 (aged 79) Charlottesville, Virginia, U.S.
- Height: 5 ft 11 in (180 cm)

Gymnastics career
- Discipline: Men's artistic gymnastics
- Country represented: United States
- College team: Navy Midshipmen (1941–1942)
- Head coach: Chet Phillips
- Retired: c. 1952

Walter Conrad Blattmann (June 23, 1920 – April 10, 2000) was an American gymnast. He was a member of the United States men's national artistic gymnastics team and competed in eight events at the 1952 Summer Olympics.

While at the United States Naval Academy, Blattmann competed on the Navy Midshipmen men's gymnastics team coached by former Olympian Chet Phillips.

He was the commanding officer at Naval Air Station Chase Field from September 1965 to August 1967.
