= United States men's national artistic gymnastics team =

Artistic gymnastics team

United States men's artistic national gymnastics team
- Founded: 1963
- Continental union: PAGU
- National federation: USA Gymnastics
- Training location: United States Olympic Training Center; Colorado Springs, CO

Olympic Games
- Appearances: 21
- Medals: Gold: 1984; Silver: 1904, 1932, 2004; Bronze: 1904, 2008, 2024

World Championships
- Medals: Silver: 2001, 2003; Bronze: 1979, 2011, 2014, 2023

Pan American Games
- Medals: Gold: 1955, 1959, 1963, 1967, 1975, 1987, 1995, 2015, 2023; Silver: 1971, 1983, 1991, 1999, 2019; Bronze: 2003, 2007, 2011

Pan American Championships
- Medals: Gold: 2005, 2010, 2014, 2018, 2022, 2023, 2025; Silver: 1997, 2001, 2021; Bronze: 2026

Junior World Championships
- Appearances: 3
- Medals: Bronze: 2025

The United States men's artistic gymnastics team represents the United States in World Gymnastics, formerly known as FIG, international competitions.

== History ==
The first national team roster was established in 1998. The team has competed at the Olympic Games 21 times, winning seven medals.

== Selection ==
Gymnasts can be selected for the national team following competition at the National Championships or Winter Cup. The Men's Program Committee (MPC) is allowed to change the criteria for selection every year.

== Current roster ==
As of August 8, 2026

=== Senior team ===
Name	Birth date and age	Hometown	Club	Head coach(es)	College team
Crew Bold	May 26, 2001 (age 25)	Delray Beach, Florida	EVO Gymnastics		Michigan Wolverines (2022–2024)
Taylor Burkhart	September 21, 2002 (age 24)	Arvada, Colorado	Stanford University	Thom Glielmi	Stanford Cardinal (2022–2025)
Asher Cohen	January 18, 2004 (age 22)	Lakewood, Colorado	University of Nebraska–Lincoln	Chuck Chmelka	Nebraska Cornhuskers (2023–2026)
Brandon Dang	May 26, 2005 (age 21)	San Jose, California	University of Illinois Urbana-Champaign	Daniel Ribeiro	Illinois Fighting Illini (2024–present)
Asher Hong	March 23, 2004 (age 22)	Tomball, Texas	Stanford University	Thom Glielmi	Stanford Cardinal (2023–2026)
Patrick Hoopes	May 15, 2002 (age 24)	Lehi, Utah	United States Air Force Academy		Air Force Falcons (2022–2025)
Joshua Karnes	July 6, 2004 (age 22)	Erie, Pennsylvania	EVO Gymnastics	Jacob Marks	Penn State Nittany Lions (2022–2025)
Cooper Kim	June 16, 2006 (age 20)	Grand Ledge, Michigan	Stanford University	Thom Glielmi	Stanford Cardinal (2025–present)
Danila Leykin	June 28, 2007 (age 19)	Sarasota, Florida	EVO Gymnastics		
Yul Moldauer	August 26, 1996 (age 30)	Arvada, Colorado	University of Oklahoma	Vladimir Artemev	Oklahoma Sooners (2016–2019)
Kameron Nelson	August 2, 2001 (age 25)	Columbus, Ohio	EVO Gymnastics	Casimiro Suárez	Ohio State Buckeyes (2021–2025)
Fred Richard	April 23, 2004 (age 22)	Stoughton, Massachusetts	University of Michigan	Yuan Xiao	Michigan Wolverines (2023–2026)
David Shamah	February 13, 2005 (age 21)	McKinney, Texas	Stanford University	Thom Glielmi	Stanford Cardinal (2024–present)
Donnell Whittenburg	August 18, 1994 (age 32)	Baltimore, Maryland	EVO Gymnastics	Anthony Ingrelli	
Shane Wiskus	October 1, 1998 (age 28)	Spring Park, Minnesota	EVO Gymnastics	Syque Caesar	Minnesota Golden Gophers (2018–2021)

=== Senior development team ===
Name	Birth date and age	Hometown	Club	Head coach(es)	College team
Hasan Aydogdu	April 21, 2006 (age 20)	Carlstadt, New Jersey	University of Illinois Urbana-Champaign	Daniel Ribeiro	Illinois Fighting Illini (2025–present)
Jun Iwai	June 12, 2006 (age 20)	Lewisville, Texas	Stanford University	Thom Glielmi	Stanford Cardinal (2026–present)
Alex Noel	October 7, 2006 (age 20)	Nashua, New Hampshire	University of Oklahoma	Mark Williams	Oklahoma Sooners (2026–present)
David Ramirez	February 7, 2006 (age 20)	Nipomo, California	Ohio State University	Rustam Sharipov	Ohio State Buckeyes (2025–present)
Nathan Roman	January 5, 2007 (age 19)	Poway, California	University of Oklahoma	Mark Williams	Oklahoma Sooners (2025–present)

== Team competition results ==
=== Olympic Games ===
Year	Position	Squad
1904	Silver medal Bronze medal	Otto Steffen, John Bissinger, Emil Beyer, Max Wolf, Julian Schmitz, Arthur Rosenkampff George Mayer, John Duha, Edward Siegler, Charles Krause, Philip Schuster, Robert Maysack
1924	5th place	Frank Kriz, Al Jochim, John Pearson, Frank Safandra, Curtis Rottman, Rudolph Novak, Max Wandrer, John Mais
1928	7th place	Al Jochim, Glenn Berry, Frank Kriz, Frank Haubold, Harold Newhart, John Pearson, Herman Witzig, Paul Krempel
1932	Silver medal	Frank Haubold, Frank Cumiskey, Al Jochim, Fred Meyer, Michael Schuler
1936	10th place	Frank Cumiskey, Fred Meyer, George Wheeler, Chet Phillips, Artie Pitt, Frank Haubold, Al Jochim, Kenny Griffin
1948	7th place	Ed Scrobe, Vincent D'Autorio, Bill Roetzheim, Joe Kotys, Frank Cumiskey, Ray Sorensen, William Bonsall, Louis Bordo
1952	8th place	Jack Beckner, Walter Blattmann, Vincent D'Autorio, Don Holder, Bill Roetzheim, Ed Scrobe, Charles Simms, Bob Stout
1956	6th place	Dick Beckner, Jack Beckner, Abie Grossfeld, Charles Simms, Bill Tom, Armando Vega
1960	5th place	Larry Banner, Jack Beckner, Abie Grossfeld, Gar O'Quinn, Fred Orlofsky, Don Tonry
1964	7th place	—N/a
1968	7th place	Kanati Allen, Steve Cohen, Sid Freudenstein, Steve Hug, Fred Roethlisberger, Dave Thor
1972	10th place	—N/a
1976	7th place	Wayne Young, Kurt Thomas, Peter Kormann, Tom Beach, Marshall Avener, Bart Conner
1980	boycott	—N/a
1984	Gold medal	Peter Vidmar, Bart Conner, Mitch Gaylord, Tim Daggett, Jim Hartung, Scott Johnson
1988	11th place	—N/a
1992	6th place	Trent Dimas, Scott Keswick, Jair Lynch, Dominick Minicucci, Jr., John Roethlisberger, Chris Waller
1996	5th place	John Roethlisberger, Blaine Wilson, John Macready, Jair Lynch, Kip Simons, Chainey Umphrey, Mihal Bagiu
2000	5th place	Blaine Wilson, Paul Hamm, Stephen McCain, John Roethlisberger, Sean Townsend, Morgan Hamm
2004	Silver medal	Jason Gatson, Morgan Hamm, Paul Hamm, Brett McClure, Blaine Wilson, Guard Young
2008	Bronze medal	Alexander Artemev, Raj Bhavsar, Joseph Hagerty, Jonathan Horton, Justin Spring, Kai Wen Tan
2012	5th place	Jacob Dalton, Jonathan Horton, Danell Leyva, Sam Mikulak, John Orozco
2016	5th place	Chris Brooks, Jacob Dalton, Danell Leyva, Sam Mikulak, Alexander Naddour
2020	5th place	Brody Malone, Sam Mikulak, Yul Moldauer, Shane Wiskus
2024	Bronze medal	Asher Hong, Paul Juda, Brody Malone, Stephen Nedoroscik, Fred Richard
Total	1 Title	

=== World Championships ===
Year	Position	Squad
1979	Bronze medal	Kurt Thomas, Bart Conner, Jim Hartung, Larry Gerard, Tim LaFleur, Peter Vidmar
2001	Silver medal	Paul Hamm, Brett McClure, Sean Townsend, Raj Bhavsar, Stephen McCain, Guard Young
2003	Silver medal	Paul Hamm, Blaine Wilson, Jason Gatson, Morgan Hamm, Brett McClure, Raj Bhavsar
2006	13th place	Guillermo Alvarez, Alexander Artemev, Jonathan Horton, David Sender, Clay Strother, Kevin Tan
2007	4th place	Jonathan Horton, Alexander Artemev, Sean Golden, Kai Wen Tan, Guillermo Alvarez, David Durante
2010	4th place	Chris Brooks, Chris Cameron, Jonathan Horton, Steven Legendre, Danell Leyva, Brandon Wynn
2011	Bronze medal	Jake Dalton, Jonathan Horton, Danell Leyva, Steven Legendre, Alexander Naddour, John Orozco
2014	Bronze medal	Jake Dalton, Danell Leyva, Sam Mikulak, Alexander Naddour, John Orozco, Donnell Whittenburg
2015	5th place	Chris Brooks, Danell Leyva, Alexander Naddour, Paul Ruggeri, Donnell Whittenburg, Brandon Wynn
2018	4th place	Sam Mikulak, Akash Modi, Yul Moldauer, Colin Van Wicklen, Alec Yoder
2019	4th place	Trevor Howard, Sam Mikulak, Akash Modi, Yul Moldauer, Shane Wiskus
2022	5th place	Asher Hong, Brody Malone, Stephen Nedoroscik, Colt Walker, Donnell Whittenburg, Yul Moldauer
2023	Bronze medal	Asher Hong, Paul Juda, Yul Moldauer, Fred Richard, Khoi Young, Colt Walker
2026	6th place	Patrick Hoopes, Danila Leykin, Kameron Nelson, Fred Richard, Shane Wiskus, Yul Moldauer
Total	0 Title	

=== Pan American Games ===
Year	Position	Squad
1951	—N/a	Did not send team, only William Roetzheim for competition.
1955	Gold medal	John Beckner, Joseph Kotys, Jack Miles, Abraham Grossfeld, Donald Holder, Richard Beckner
1959	Gold medal	John Beckner, Donald Tonry, Gregor Weiss, Abraham Grossfeld, Garland O'Quinn, Jamile Ashmore
1963	Gold medal	Jay Warner, Donald Tonry, Fred Orlofsky, Abraham Grossfeld, Garland O'Quinn, Jamile Ashmore
1967	Gold medal	Fred Roethlisberger, David Thor, Mark Cohn, Arno Lascari, Robert Emery, Richard Lloyd
1971	Silver medal	Gary Anderson, David Butzman, John Crosby, John Ellas, Thomas Lindner, Brent Simmons
1975	Gold medal	Marshall Avener, Bart Conner, Peter Kormann, Kurt Thomas, Glenn Tidwell, Gene Whelan
1979	—N/a	Did not send team, only individuals for competition.
1983	Silver medal	Brian Babcock, Thomas Beach, Mark Caso, Mario McCutcheon, Billy Paul, Joey Ray
1987	Gold medal	Tim Daggett, Kevin Davis, Brian Ginsberg, Scott Johnson, Charles Lakes, Tom Schlesinger
1991	Silver medal	Trent Dimas, Jeff Lutz, Dominick Minicucci, Mike Racanelli, Bob Stelter, Mark Warburton
1995	Gold medal	Mihai Bagiu, Stephen McCain, John Roethlisberger, Bill Roth, Kip Simons, Chainey Umphrey, Chris Waller
1999	Silver medal	Michael Ashe, Raj Bhavsar, Michael Dutka, Stephen McCain, Michael Moran, James Young
2003	Bronze medal	David Durante, Daniel Gill, Jonathan Horton, Sho Nakamori, David Sender, Clayton Strother
2007	Bronze medal	Guillermo Alvarez, David Durante, Sean Golden, Joey Hagerty, Justin Spring, Todd Thornton
2011	Bronze medal	Donothan Bailey, Christopher Maestas, Tyler Mizoguchi, Sho Nakamori, Paul Ruggeri, Brandon Wynn
2015	Gold medal	Marvin Kimble, Steven Legendre, Sam Mikulak, Paul Ruggeri, Donnell Whittenburg
2019	Silver medal	Cameron Bock, Grant Breckenridge, Brody Malone, Robert Neff, Genki Suzuki
2023	Gold medal	Cameron Bock, Stephen Nedoroscik, Curran Phillips, Colt Walker, Donnell Whittenburg
Total	9 Titles	

=== Pan American Championships ===
Year	Position	Squad
1997	Silver medal	Sanjuan Jones, Michael Dutka, Aaron Cotter, Jay Thornton
2001	Silver medal	Todd Thornton, Kris Zimmerman, Guard Young, Daniel Diaz-Luong
2005	Gold medal	Guillermo Alvarez, Joseph Hagerty, Jonathan Horton, David Durante
2010	Gold medal	Dylan Akers, Alexander Buscaglia, Jacob Dalton, Brian del Castillo, Wesley Haagensen, Glen Ishino
2014	Gold medal	Sean Melton, Christopher Maestas, Marvin Kimble, Jonathan Horton, Brandon Wynn, Eddie Penev
2018	Gold medal	Cameron Bock, Spencer Goodell, Riley Loos, Kanji Oyama, Genki Suzuki
2021	Silver medal	Cameron Bock, Vitaliy Guimaraes, Paul Juda, Riley Loos, Donnell Whittenburg
2022	Gold medal	Taylor Burkhart, Riley Loos, Brody Malone, Yul Moldauer, Colt Walker, Shane Wiskus
2023	Gold medal	Taylor Christopulos, Yul Moldauer, Curran Phillips, Donnell Whittenburg, Shane Wiskus, Khoi Young
2024	—N/a	Did not participate
2025	Gold medal	Taylor Burkhart, Taylor Christopulos, Brandon Dang, Asher Hong, Jun Iwai, Joshua Karnes
2026	Bronze medal	Taylor Burkhart, Patrick Hoopes, Riley Loos, Yul Moldauer, Kameron Nelson
Total	7 Titles	

=== Junior World Championships ===
Year	Position	Squad
2019	7th place	Garrett Braunton, Matthew Cormier, Isaiah Drake
2023	6th place	Kiran Mandava, David Shamah, Kai Uemura
2025	Bronze medal	Danila Leykin, Dante Reive, Nathan Roman, Maksim Kan
Total	0 Title	

== Most decorated gymnasts ==
This list includes all American male artistic gymnasts who have won at least four medals at the Olympic Games and the World Artistic Gymnastics Championships combined.

Rank	Gymnast	Years	Team	AA	FX	PH	SR	VT	PB	HB	Olympic Total	World Total	Total
1	Paul Hamm	2001–2004	2004; 2001; 2003	2004; 2003	2003; 2002					2004	3	5	8
2	Danell Leyva	2011–2016	2011; 2014	2012					2016; 2011; 2014	2016; 2015	3	5	8
3	Kurt Thomas	1978–1979	1979	1979	1978; 1979	1979			1979	1979	0	7	7
4	Bart Conner	1979–1984	1984; 1979					1979	1984; 1979		2	3	5
5	Peter Vidmar	1979–1984	1984; 1979	1984		1984					3	1	4
6	Brody Malone	2021–2025	2024							2022; 2025; 2021	1	3	4
7	Mitch Gaylord	1984	1984				1984	1984	1984		4	0	4
8	Fred Richard	2023–2026	2024; 2023	2023	2026						1	3	4
9	Jake Dalton	2011–2013	2011; 2014		2013			2014			0	4	4
9	Jonathan Horton	2008–2011	2008; 2011	2010						2008	2	2	4

== Best international results ==
Event	TF	AA	FX	PH	SR	VT	PB	HB
Olympic Games	1st place, gold medalist(s)	1st place, gold medalist(s)	3rd place, bronze medalist(s)	1st place, gold medalist(s)	1st place, gold medalist(s)	1st place, gold medalist(s)	1st place, gold medalist(s)	1st place, gold medalist(s)
World Championships	2nd place, silver medalist(s)	1st place, gold medalist(s)	1st place, gold medalist(s)	1st place, gold medalist(s)	1st place, gold medalist(s)	2nd place, silver medalist(s)	1st place, gold medalist(s)	1st place, gold medalist(s)
Pan American Games	1st place, gold medalist(s)	1st place, gold medalist(s)	1st place, gold medalist(s)	1st place, gold medalist(s)	1st place, gold medalist(s)	1st place, gold medalist(s)	1st place, gold medalist(s)	1st place, gold medalist(s)
Pan American Championships	1st place, gold medalist(s)	1st place, gold medalist(s)	1st place, gold medalist(s)	1st place, gold medalist(s)	2nd place, silver medalist(s)	1st place, gold medalist(s)	1st place, gold medalist(s)	1st place, gold medalist(s)
Youth Olympic Games	—N/a	3rd place, bronze medalist(s)	5	5	4	1st place, gold medalist(s)	4	4
Junior World Championships	3rd place, bronze medalist(s)	4	6	–	1st place, gold medalist(s)	–	3rd place, bronze medalist(s)	2nd place, silver medalist(s)
Junior Pan American Games	1st place, gold medalist(s)	1st place, gold medalist(s)	1st place, gold medalist(s)	1st place, gold medalist(s)	3rd place, bronze medalist(s)	2nd place, silver medalist(s)	1st place, gold medalist(s)	2nd place, silver medalist(s)
Junior Pan American Championships	1st place, gold medalist(s)	1st place, gold medalist(s)	1st place, gold medalist(s)	1st place, gold medalist(s)	1st place, gold medalist(s)	1st place, gold medalist(s)	1st place, gold medalist(s)	1st place, gold medalist(s)

== See also ==
- United States women's national gymnastics team
- List of Olympic male artistic gymnasts for the United States
- United States at the World Artistic Gymnastics Championships
