= 2019 Winter Cup =

Artistic gymnastics competition in the USA

- Venue: South Point Hotel, Casino & Spa
- Location: Las Vegas, Nevada, U.S.
- Dates: February 15—February 17, 2019

The 2019 Winter Cup was an artistic gymnastics competition held at the South Point Hotel, Casino & Spa in Las Vegas from February 15 to February 17, 2019.

== Competition ==
The competition featured both junior and senior competitive divisions. The finals session featured the top 28 senior athletes and the top 14 junior athletes. Junior athletes advanced to the finals according to the all-around ranking from the first day of competition. All-around ranking and individual event champions were determined via a combined two-day score.

== Medalists ==
Event	Gold	Silver	Bronze
Junior Men
Individual all-around	Colt Walker	Isaiah Drake	J.R. Chou
Floor	Khoi Young	Nicolas Kuebler	J.R. Chou
Pommel horse	J.R. Chou	Raydel Gamboa	Colt Walker
Rings	Fuzzy Benas	Isaiah Drake	Colt Walker
Vault	Colt Walker	Khoi Young Jordan Williams	—
Parallel bars	Logan Myers	Isaiah Drake	J.R. Chou
Horizontal bar	Taylor Burkhart Nicolas Kuebler	—	Donovan Hewitt
Senior Men
Individual all-around	Yul Moldauer	Sam Mikulak	Allan Bower
Floor	Sam Mikulak	Jacob Moore	Riley Loos
Pommel horse	Stephen Nedoroscik	Sam Mikulak	Cameron Bock
Rings	Trevor Howard	Alex Diab	Sam Mikulak
Vault	Colin Van Wicklen	Trevor Howard	Levi Anderso
Parallel bars	Adrian de los Angeles	Sam Mikulak	Grant Breckenridge
Horizontal bar	Sam Mikulak	Colin Van Wicklen	Levi Anderson

== Participants ==
The following individuals participated in the competition:

=== Juniors ===
- Justin Ah Chow (Universal Gymnastics)
- Lazarus Barnhil (Cypress Academy)
- Fuzzy Benas (EnRich Gymnastics)
- Landen Blixt (Infinity Gymnastics)
- Crew Bold (TAG USA)
- Garrett Braunton (Cypress Academy)
- Taylor Burkhart (5280 Gymnastics)
- Arun Chhetri (Gymnastics Olympica)
- John Chou (Cypress Academy)
- Taylor Christopulos (USA Gymnastics World)
- Caden Clinton (Cypress Academy)
- Matthew Cormier (MEGA-MA)
- Isaiah Drake (Gymnastics Olympica)
- Jack Freeman (Cypress Academy)
- Raydel Gamboa (North Valley Gymnastics)
- Noah Giordano (5280 Gymnastics)
- William Hauke (DeVeau's Gymnastics)
- Donovan Hewitt (Paragon Gymnastics)
- Asher Hong (Cypress Academy)
- Michael Jaroh (MEGA–MI)
- Cannon Johnson (US Gym Dev Center II)
- Joshua Karnes (Lakettes Gymnastics)
- Nicolas Kuebler (Metropolitan Gymnastics)
- Ian Lasic-Ellis (MEGA-MA)
- Zachary Martin (Elevate Gymnastics)
- Luke McFarland (Daggett Gymnastics)
- Logan Myers (5280 Gymnastics)
- Brandon Nguyen (Elevate Gymnastics)
- Curran Phillips (Stanford University)
- Samuel Phillips (Gymnastics Olympica)
- Rithik Puri (Lakeshore Academy)
- Tyler Rockwood (Hocking Valley Gym)
- Daniel Simmons (Cypress Academy)
- Zachary Tiderman (OMEGA Gymnastics)
- Colt Walker (AcroTex Gymnastics)
- Jordan Williams (Arizona State University)
- Adam Wooten (Harpeth Gymnastics)
- Khoi Young (Sportsplex Gymnastics)

=== Seniors ===
- Levi Anderson (University of Oklahoma)
- Andrew Bitner (Stanford University)
- Cameron Bock (University of Michigan)
- Allan Bower (University of Oklahoma)
- Grant Breckenridge (Stanford University)
- Jake Brodarzon (University of Iowa)
- Cole Casanova (Army Gymnastics)
- Emyre Cole (University of Michigan)
- Kyte Crigger (UC Berkeley)
- Evan Davis (University of Iowa)
- Adrian de los Angeles (USOTC)
- Seth Delbridge (Ohio State University)
- Alex Diab (University of Illinois)
- Gage Dyer (University of Oklahoma)
- Michael Fletcher (University of Illinois)
- Alexander Frack (Penn State University)
- Spencer Goodell (University of Oklahoma)
- Vitaliy Guimaraes (University of Oklahoma)
- Ian Gunther (Stanford University)
- Shaun Herzog (University of Minnesota)
- Trevor Howard (Ohio State University)
- Bennet Huang (University of Iowa)
- Johnny Jacobson (University of Illinois)
- William Jeffreys (Ohio State University)
- Tanner Justus (University of Oklahoma)
- Griffin Kehler (University of Nebraska)
- Marvin Kimble (Salto Gymnastics)
- Kyle King (University of Nebraska)
- Evan Kriley (University of Nebraska)
- Angel Leon (Ohio State University)
- Riley Loos (Technique Gymnastics)
- Ellis Mannon (University of Minnesota)
- Ryan McVay (US Naval Academy)
- Sean Melton (Ohio State University)
- Sam Mikulak (USOTC)
- Akash Modi (Stanford University)
- Yul Moldauer (University of Oklahoma)
- Jacob Moore (University of Michigan)
- Stephen Nedoroscik (Penn State University)
- Robert Neff (Stanford University)
- Kanji Oyama (USOTC)
- Eddie Penev (USOTC)
- Kevin Penev (University of Michigan)
- Bailey Perez (Stanford University)
- Sebastian Quiana (University of Illinois)
- Tyler Schaal (Universal Gymnastics)
- Anton Stephenson (University of Nebraska)
- Genki Suzuki (University of Oklahoma)
- Colin VanWicklen (University of Oklahoma)
- Alexei Vernyi (University of Oklahoma)
- Kiwan Watts (Arizona State University)
- Matthew Wenske (University of Oklahoma)
- Donnell Whittenburg (USOTC)
- Shane Wiskus (University of Minnesota)
- Alec Yoder (Ohio State University)
