= Kanati Allen =

American artistic gymnast

- Portrait of Allen

Personal information
- Full name: James Kanati Allen
- Born: January 25, 1947 Los Angeles, California, U.S.
- Died: December 31, 2011 (aged 64) Los Angeles, California, U.S.
- Height: 1.73 m (5 ft 8 in)

Gymnastics career
- Discipline: Men's artistic gymnastics
- Country represented: United States
- College team: UCLA Bruins (1964–1968)
- Club: Los Angeles High School
- Head coach: Art Shurlock
- Retired: c. 1972
Medal record
Men's artistic gymnastics
Representing United States
Event	1st	2nd	3rd
Universiade	0	1	0
Total	0	1	0
Universiade
Silver medal – second place	1967 Tokyo	Team

James Kanati Allen (January 25, 1947 – December 31, 2011) was an American gymnast. He was a member of the United States men's national artistic gymnastics team and competed for the seventh-place U.S. team at the 1968 Summer Olympics. Allen, who is black and Cherokee, was the first African-American gymnast to compete at the Olympic Games.

Allen attended Los Angeles High School before attending University of California, Los Angeles where he competed as a member of the UCLA Bruins men's gymnastics team from 1964 to 1968.

His last major competition was the 1972 United States Olympic trials where he was not selected for the 1972 Summer Olympics.

He received a PhD in physics from the University of Washington.
