= Fred Orlofsky =

American artistic gymnast

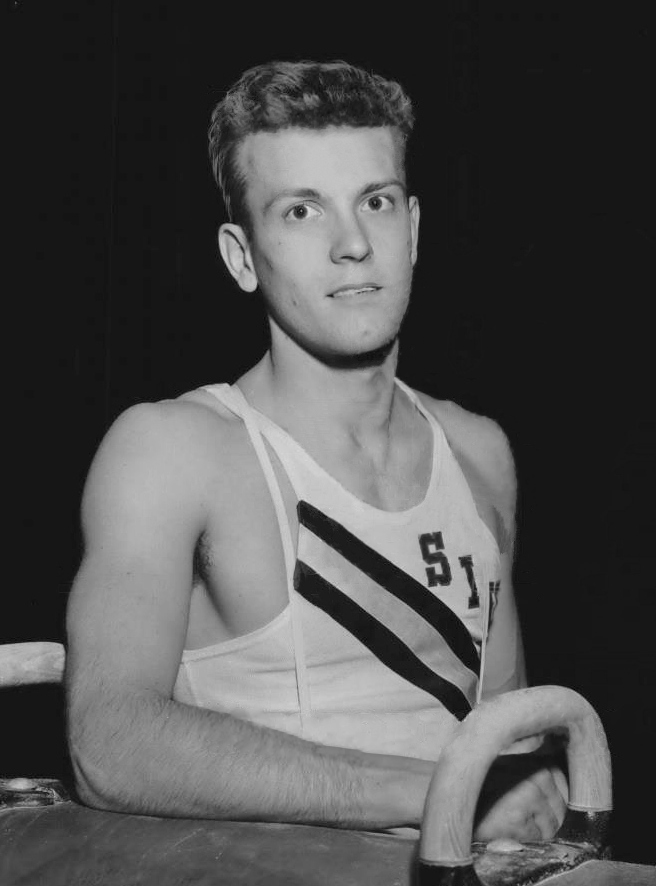
- Orlofsky in 1960

Personal information
- Full name: Frederick Charles Orlofsky
- Born: April 8, 1937 North Bergen, New Jersey, U.S.
- Height: 173 cm (5 ft 8 in)

Gymnastics career
- Discipline: Men's artistic gymnastics
- Country represented: United States
- College team: Southern Illinois Salukis
- Gym: Swiss Turners
- Former coaches: Bob Miles; Frank Cumiskey; Vincent D'Autorio; Bill Meade
Medal record
Men's artistic gymnastics
Representing United States
Event	1st	2nd	3rd
Pan American Games	1	0	0
Total	1	0	0
Pan American Games
Gold medal – first place	1963 São Paulo	Team

Frederick Charles Orlofsky (born April 8, 1937) is a retired American artistic gymnast. He was a member of the United States men's national artistic gymnastics team and competed at the 1960 Summer Olympics and finished fifth with the team. He was part of the American team that won a gold medal at the 1963 Pan American Games.

Orlofsky was born in North Bergen, New Jersey. He competed for William L. Dickinson High School and Southern Illinois Salukis men's gymnastics teams. He won 1960 AAU titles in all-around, rings, and parallel bars, placing second on the horizontal bar and third on the pommel horse. He won a 1961 NCAA title on the rings and placed second all-around in 1961–63. After retiring from competitions he coached gymnasts at Western Michigan University from 1966 to 1996. Between 1964 and 2000 he also judged competitions, both nationally and internationally. In 1985 he was inducted into the U.S. Gymnastics Hall of Fame.

Orlofsky is married to Holly Dee Brown, they have three children. He lives in Florida.
