= Frank Safanda =

American gymnast

- Born: January 11, 1895 New York City, New York, U.S.
- Died: April 24, 1948 (aged 53) Nutley, New Jersey, U.S.
- Height: 157 cm (5 ft 2 in)

Gymnastics career
- Discipline: Men's artistic gymnastics
- Country represented: United States
- Gym: D.A. Sokol

Frank Safanda (January 11, 1895 – April 24, 1948) was an American gymnast. He was a member of the United States men's national artistic gymnastics team and competed in the 1924 Summer Olympics. He competed in all 9 of the gymnastic events in the 1924 games. Safanda worked in New Jersey as a machinist for the Hyatt Bearing Division of General Motors.

As a gymnast, Safanda was a member of D.A. Sokol of New York.
