= Chris Waller (gymnast) =

American gymnast

- Full name: Manfred Christopher Waller
- Born: September 20, 1968 (age 57) Evanston, Illinois, U.S.
- Height: 167 cm (5 ft 6 in)

Gymnastics career
- Discipline: Men's artistic gymnastics
- Country represented: United States; (1989–1997)
- College team: UCLA Bruins
- Gym: Gold Cup Gymnastics
- Head coach: Arthur Shurlock
Medal record
Representing United States
Men's artistic gymnastics
Event	1st	2nd	3rd
Pan American Games	1	0	0
Goodwill Games	0	1	2
Total	1	1	2
Pan American Games
Gold medal – first place	1995 Mar del Plata	Team
Goodwill Games
Silver medal – second place	1990 Seattle	Team
Bronze medal – third place	1990 Seattle	Pommel horse
Bronze medal – third place	1990 Seattle	Rings
- Coaching career

Coaching career (HC unless noted)
- 2003–2007: UCLA Bruins (Assistant coach)
- 2008–2011: UCLA Bruins (Assistant head coach)
- 2012–2019: UCLA Bruins (Associate head coach)
- 2020–2022: UCLA Bruins

Manfred Christopher Waller (born September 20, 1968, in Evanston, Illinois) is a retired American gymnast. He was a member of the United States men's national artistic gymnastics team and competed in the 1990 Goodwill Games, and the 1992 Summer Olympics.

From 2020 to 2022, he was the head coach for the UCLA Bruins gymnastics team; his alma mater.
