= Gar O'Quinn =

American gymnast (born 1935)

- Full name: Garland Deloid O'Quinn, Jr.
- Born: July 1, 1935 Fort Worth, Texas, U.S.
- Height: 173 cm (5 ft 8 in)

Gymnastics career
- Discipline: Men's artistic gymnastics
- Country represented: United States
- College team: Army Black Knights
Medal record
Men's artistic gymnastics
Representing United States
Event	1st	2nd	3rd
Pan American Games	3	0	2
Total	3	0	2
Pan American Games
Gold medal – first place	1959 Chicago	Team
Gold medal – first place	1963 São Paulo	Team
Gold medal – first place	1963 São Paulo	Pommel horse
Bronze medal – third place	1959 Chicago	Pommel horse
Bronze medal – third place	1963 São Paulo	Parallel bars

Garland Deloid "Gar" O'Quinn, Jr. (born July 1, 1935) is an American former gymnast. He was a member of the United States men's national artistic gymnastics team and is a five-time medalist, including three gold medals, at the Pan American Games. He competed at the 1960 Summer Olympics. In 1995, he was inducted into the US Gymnastics Hall of Fame.

O'Quinn attended the United States Military Academy at West Point.

== Bibliography ==
- 1971: The Effects of Practice Upon the Activity of Antagonistic Muscles During the Performance of a Motor Task
