= Gymnastics at the 2024 Summer Olympics – Men's pommel horse =

Men's pommel horse at the Games of the XXXIII Olympiad
- Olympic artistic gymnastics
- Venue: Accor Arena
- Date: 27 July 2024 (qualifying); 3 August 2024 (final)
- Competitors: 8 from 8 nations

Medalists
1st place, gold medalist(s)		Rhys McClenaghan	Ireland
2nd place, silver medalist(s)		Nariman Kurbanov	Kazakhstan
3rd place, bronze medalist(s)		Stephen Nedoroscik	United States

The men's pommel horse event at the 2024 Summer Olympics was held on 27 July and 3 August 2024 at the Accor Arena (referred to as the Bercy Arena due to IOC sponsorship rules).

== Competition Format ==
The top 8 qualifiers (limit two per NOC) for pommel horse advanced to the apparatus finals.

== Schedule ==
The competition was held over two days, 27 July and 3 August. The qualifying round (for all men's gymnastics events) was on the first day with the apparatus final on the second day.

Date	Time	Round	Subdivision
27 July	11:00	Qualification	Subdivision 1
27 July	15:30	Qualification	Subdivision 2
27 July	20:00	Qualification	Subdivision 3
3 August	17:15	Final	–
All times are Central European Summer Time (UTC+2)

== Qualification ==
Rank	Gymnast	D Score	E Score	Pen.	Total	Qual.
1	Rhys McClenaghan (IRL)	6.3	8.900		15.200	Q
2	Stephen Nedoroscik (USA)	6.4	8.800		15.200	Q
3	Max Whitlock (GBR)	6.6	8.566		15.166	Q
4	Takaaki Sugino (JPN)	6.5	8.533		15.033	Q
5	Oleg Verniaiev (UKR)	6.6	8.433		15.033	Q
6	Nariman Kurbanov (KAZ)	6.4	8.600		15.000	Q
7	Hur Woong (KOR)	6.7	8.200		14.900	Q
8	Loran de Munck (NED)	6.4	8.366		14.766	Q
9	Zou Jingyuan (CHN)	5.9	8.700		14.600	R1
10	Nils Dunkel (GER)	6.4	8.166		14.566	R2
11	Shinnosuke Oka (JPN)	5.9	8.566		14.466	R3

Reserves

The reserves for the men's pommel horse final were:

1. Zou Jingyuan (CHN)
2. Nils Dunkel (GER)
3. Shinnosuke Oka (JPN)

== Final ==
Rank	Gymnast	D Score	E Score	Pen.	Total
1st place, gold medalist(s)	Rhys McClenaghan (IRL)	6.600	8.933		15.533
2nd place, silver medalist(s)	Nariman Kurbanov (KAZ)	6.700	8.733		15.433
3rd place, bronze medalist(s)	Stephen Nedoroscik (USA)	6.400	8.900		15.300
4	Max Whitlock (GBR)	6.900	8.300		15.200
5	Oleg Verniaiev (UKR)	6.600	8.366		14.966
6	Takaaki Sugino (JPN)	6.700	8.233		14.933
7	Hur Woong (KOR)	6.700	7.600		14.300
8	Loran de Munck (NED)	6.500	7.233		13.733
