= Max Wandrer =

American gymnast (1894–1978)

- Full name: Max Carl Herman Wandrer
- Born: February 10, 1894 Rudolstadt, German Empire
- Died: October 1, 1978 (aged 84) Middle River, Maryland, U.S.

Gymnastics career
- Discipline: Men's artistic gymnastics
- Country represented: United States
- Gym: Philadelphia Turngemeinde

Max Carl Herman Wandrer (February 10, 1894 – October 1, 1978) was an American gymnast. He was a member of the United States men's national artistic gymnastics team and competed in the 1924 Summer Olympics. He was born in Rudolstadt and died in Middle River, Maryland.

As a gymnast, Wandrer was a member of Philadelphia Turngemeinde, also known as Philadelphia Turners.
