= Kenny Griffin =

American gymnast

- Full name: Kenneth Julian Griffin
- Born: January 27, 1912 Logan, Utah, U.S.
- Died: September 26, 2002 (aged 90) Oceanside, California, U.S.

Gymnastics career
- Discipline: Men's artistic gymnastics
- Country represented: United States
- Gym: Los Angeles Athletic Club

Kenneth Julian Griffin (January 27, 1912 – September 26, 2002) was an American gymnast. He was a member of the United States men's national artistic gymnastics team and competed in eight events at the 1936 Summer Olympics.

As a gymnast, Griffin was a member of Los Angeles Athletic Club.
