= Stephen Nedoroscik =

American gymnast (born 1998)

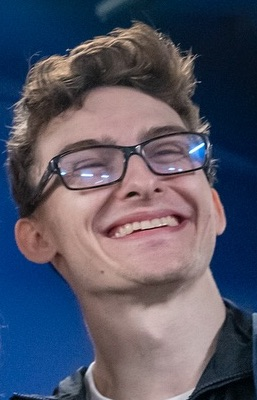
- Nedoroscik at the 2024 Summer Olympics

Personal information
- Full name: Stephen John Nedoroscik
- Born: October 28, 1998 (age 28) Worcester, Massachusetts, U.S.

Gymnastics career
- Discipline: Men's artistic gymnastics
- Country represented: United States; (2019–2025)
- College team: Penn State Nittany Lions (2017–2020)
- Gym: EVO Gymnastics
- Head coach: Syque Caesar
- Assistant coaches: Kevin Mazeika, Sam Mikulak
- Awards: Nissen-Emery Award (2020)
Medal record
Men's artistic gymnastics
Representing United States
Event	1st	2nd	3rd
Olympic Games	0	0	2
World Championships	1	0	0
Pan American Games	1	0	0
Total	2	0	2
Olympic Games
Bronze medal – third place	2024 Paris	Team
Bronze medal – third place	2024 Paris	Pommel horse
World Championships
Gold medal – first place	2021 Kitakyushu	Pommel horse
Pan American Games
Gold medal – first place	2023 Santiago	Team
FIG World Cup
Event	1st	2nd	3rd
World Cup	2	0	0
Total	2	0	0

Stephen John Nedoroscik OLY (/ˌnɛdəˈrɒzɪk/ NED-ə-ROZ-ik; born October 28, 1998) is an American artistic gymnast. A pommel horse specialist, he is the 2024 Olympic bronze medalist, the 2021 world champion—the first and only American to win the event—a two-time FIG World Cup champion, a four-time U.S. national champion, and a two-time NCAA national champion on the apparatus for Penn State.

Additionally, Nedoroscik was part of the medal-winning teams at the 2024 Olympic Games (bronze) and the 2023 Pan American Games (gold).

== Early life and education ==
Nedoroscik was born on October 28, 1998, in Worcester, Massachusetts. His father, John Nedoroscik, is a retired police officer for the Webster Police Department, and his mother, Cheryl Nedoroscik (née Courtney), is a client experience manager for a local savings bank in Holden. He was raised in Indian Lake with his older sister, Samantha, and his twin sister, Anastasia. Their paternal grandfather, whom Nedoroscik is named after, was a U.S. Navy veteran who served in World War II and the Korean War. Nedoroscik is of Polish and Slovak descent; his paternal great-grandparents emigrated from present-day Haligovce and Veľká Lesná, Slovakia.

Nedoroscik was born with strabismus and coloboma, causing him to have a lack of depth perception and a high sensitivity to light. The vision impairments requires him to wear eyeglasses and prevents him from obtaining a driver's license. He is also asthmatic. Nedoroscik studied electro-mechanical engineering at Worcester Technical High School and was part of its robotics automation technology program. He then attended Pennsylvania State University, graduating with a degree in electrical engineering in 2020.

== Gymnastics career ==
Nedoroscik began his gymnastics career in 2003 and competed on all apparatuses. Around the time he was in high school, he noticed that he was only progressing on pommel horse and decided to specialize in that event. In 2015 and 2016, he won the Junior Olympic national title on the pommel horse. He is well known for competing in goggles which were originally a Secret Santa gift for him from Penn State teammate Ben Cooperman.

=== 2017 ===
Nedoroscik began competing for the Penn State Nittany Lions in 2017 and became the NCAA National Champion on the pommel horse during his freshman season. Additionally, he qualified to compete at the 2017 U.S. National Championships, where he finished seventh on pommel horse.

=== 2018 ===
Nedoroscik began the 2018 season competing at the Winter Cup Challenge and placed fourth on the pommel horse. Nedoroscik won the Big Ten title on the pommel horse. At the 2018 NCAA National Championships, Nedoroscik defended his pommel horse title and helped Penn State finish sixth as a team. Although already pre-qualified to the U.S. National Championships, Nedoroscik competed at the National Qualifier, where he finished fourth on pommel horse. At the National Championships, Nedoroscik placed ninth on pommel horse after having a subpar performance on day two of the competition.

=== 2019 ===
Nedoroscik competed at the 2019 Winter Cup and placed first on the pommel horse, winning his first elite-level title. As a result, he was added to the national team for the first time. Nedoroscik made his international debut at the Doha World Cup, where he finished sixth. At the NCAA National Championships, Nedoroscik helped Penn State finish sixth as a team while he finished second on pommel horse behind Alec Yoder of Ohio State.

Nedoroscik and Alex Diab were selected to compete at the World University Games. Nedoroscik finished thirteenth during qualification and did not advance to the pommel horse final. At the 2019 U.S. National Championships, he finished second on pommel horse behind Sam Mikulak. Nedoroscik ended the season competing at the Cottbus World Cup, where he finished eighth.

=== 2020–21 ===
In early 2020, Nedoroscik competed at the Melbourne World Cup and won gold on the pommel horse, his first international medal. He next traveled to Azerbaijan to compete at the Baku World Cup; however, he immediately returned home when the U.S. State Department raised its alert level for travel to Azerbaijan due to COVID-19 fears. Nedoroscik's senior NCAA season was cut short due to the ongoing COVID-19 pandemic, and the NCAA Championships were canceled. Nedoroscik was awarded the Nissen Emery Award, the highest honor in college men's gymnastics.

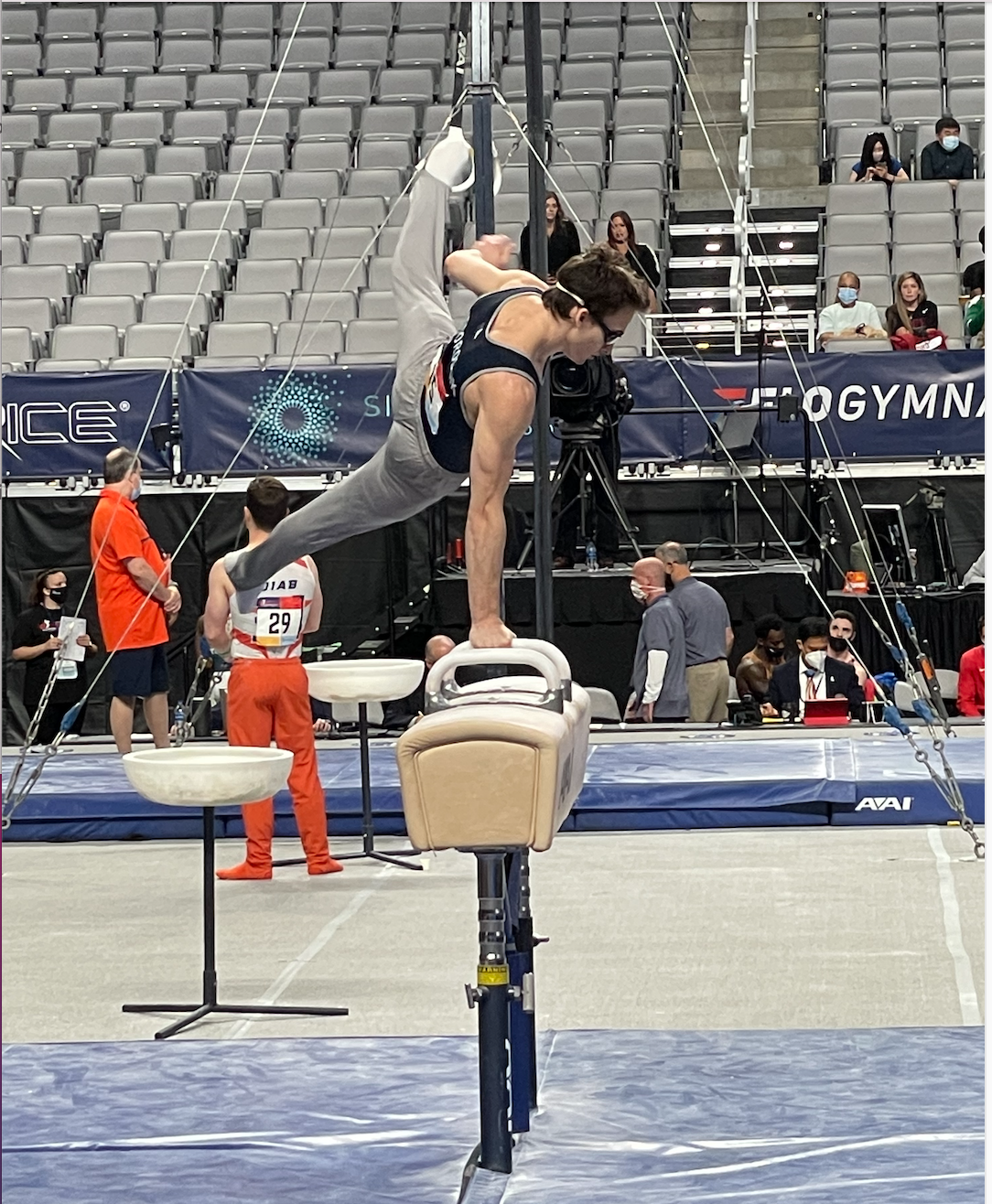
Nedoroscik at the 2021 National Championships

Nedoroscik returned to competition at the 2021 Winter Cup, where he placed second on pommel horse behind Alec Yoder. At the 2021 U.S. National Championships, Nedoroscik placed first on pommel horse and won his first elite-level national title. As a result, he qualified to compete at the 2020 Olympic Trials. At the Olympic Trials Nedoroscik fell on the first day of competition. As a result, he finished third on the pommel horse and the selection committee opted to choose Yoder, who finished first, as the individual athlete to send to the Olympic Games.

In September, Nedoroscik competed at the Worlds team selection trials. He was named one of the six members after posting scores of 14.8 and 15.5 during the two days of competition. At the 2021 World Championships, Nedoroscik qualified to the pommel horse final in second place, behind Weng Hao of China. During the final, he bested both Weng and 2020 Olympic bronze medalist Kazuma Kaya to win the world title. This was the United States' first world title on pommel horse and the first gold medal won by an American male artistic gymnast since 2011. Additionally, it was the only gold medal won by a USA gymnast, man or woman, at the 2021 World Championships.

=== 2022 ===
In late July, Nedoroscik returned to competition and competed at the U.S. Classic. Although he fell off the pommel horse, he finished with the top score. He next competed at the U.S. National Championships, where he won his second consecutive national title on the pommel horse. In October, Nedoroscik was named to the team to compete at the 2022 World Championships alongside Brody Malone, Asher Hong, Colt Walker, and Donnell Whittenburg. During qualifications, Nedoroscik finished second on pommel horse and qualified for the event final. During the team final, he contributed scores on the pommel horse toward the USA's fifth-place finish. During the pommel horse final, he finished fifth.

=== 2023 ===
In February, Nedoroscik competed at the Winter Cup; he placed third on pommel horse behind Ian Skirkey and Ignacio Yockers. In August, Nedoroscik competed at the Core Hydration Classic and placed first on the pommel horse. He next competed at the Xfinity National Championships, where he once again placed first on pommel horse. The following day, he was named to the team to compete at the Pan American Games taking place in late October alongside Donnell Whittenburg, Colt Walker, Shane Wiskus (later replaced by Curran Phillips), and Cameron Bock.

At the Pan American Games, Nedoroscik helped the United States win team gold. Individually, he qualified for the pommel horse final. During the pommel horse final, he finished fifth.

=== 2024 ===
In March 2024, Nedoroscik competed at the Baku World Cup, where he co-won gold on pommel horse alongside Lee Chih-kai.

During the 2024 U.S. National Championships, Nedoroscik won the national title for the pommel horse. This led to his selection for the 2024 United States national team and his qualification to compete at the 2024 US Olympic Trials. After his performance at the U.S. National Championships and the U.S. Olympic Trials, where his combined score placed him first on pommel horse, he was selected to the U.S. Olympic team to compete at the 2024 Olympic Games alongside Brody Malone, Fred Richard, Asher Hong, and Paul Juda.

"It's [eyesight] not necessarily clear, but the thing about pommel horse is if I keep them [eyeglasses] on, they’re gonna fly somewhere. When I go up on the pommel horse, it's all about feeling the equipment. I don't even really see when I'm doing my gymnastics. It's all in the hands – I can feel everything."

— Nedoroscik in Paris, 2024

==== 2024 Olympic Games ====
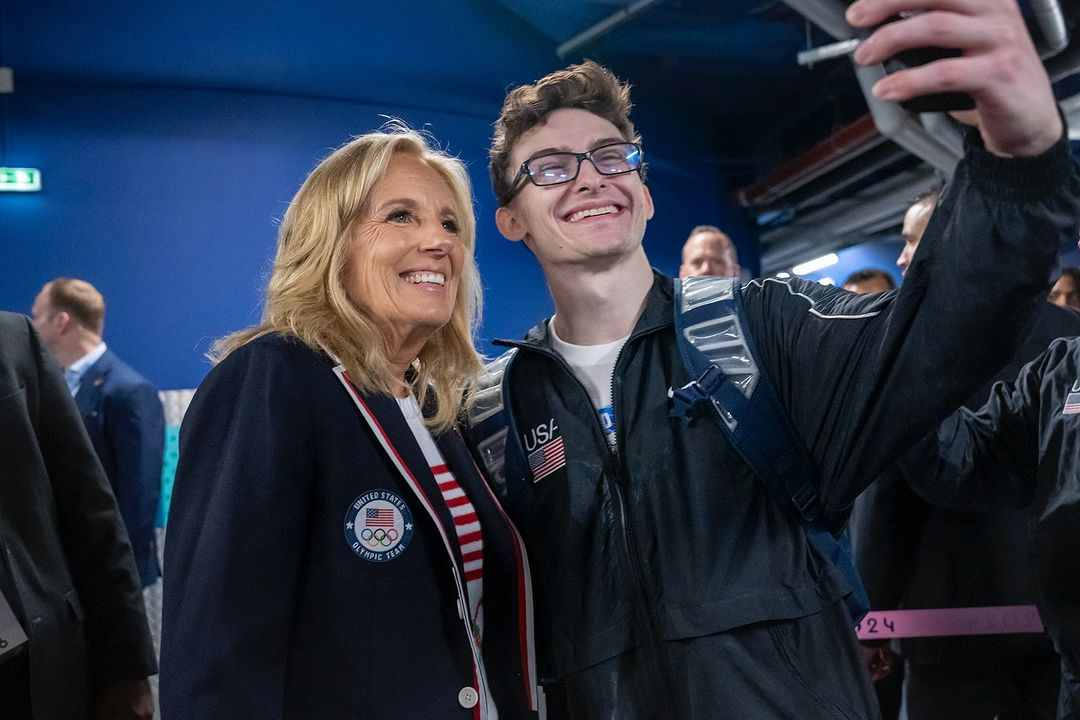
Nedoroscik and First Lady Jill Biden at the 2024 Summer Olympic Games

During qualifications at the Olympic Games, Nedoroscik qualified for the pommel horse final in second place, behind Rhys McClenaghan. They both scored 15.200; however, McClenaghan advanced to the final as the top-ranked gymnast based on his higher execution score. Additionally, he helped Team USA qualify to the team final in fifth place. Due to this fifth-place ranking, the United States started the team final competing on still rings and would finish on pommel horse. Nedoroscik therefore had to wait about two and a half hours before competing in his sole routine in the team final event. For his pommel horse routine, Nedoroscik performed a less difficult set than in qualification but still scored 14.866, helping Team USA win the bronze medal, its first medal since the 2008 games.

In the pommel horse final, he scored a 15.300 to win the bronze medal, the first individual medal for the men's team since the 2016 games.

=== 2025–2026 ===
Nedoroscik competing at the 2026 U.S. National Championships

Nedoroscik competed at the 2025 U.S. National Championships where he finished fifth on pommel horse; he was not added to the national team. In October 2025, he underwent hip surgery to repair a torn labrum and cartilage damage.

At the 2026 U.S. National Championships, Nedoroscik once again finished fifth on pommel horse after falling off the apparatus on the second night of competition and was not added to the national team. In September 2026, Nedoroscik revealed that he has been suffering from shoulder issues and began receiving PRP injections.

== In the media ==
Nedoroscik garnered significant media attention for his performances in the 2024 Summer Olympics and has been dubbed "The Specialist" and "Pommel Horse Guy". His removal of his eyeglasses before his pommel horse routines has been widely compared to Clark Kent's transformation into Superman. After returning home from the Olympics, Nedoroscik received a virtual greeting from actor David Corenswet, who stars as the eponymous character in Superman (2025), on behalf of non-profit Gold Meets Golden and its partner Samsung.

Nedoroscik appeared on The Tonight Show Starring Jimmy Fallon on the August 13, 2024 episode. The following day, he appeared on the Today Show with b-boy Victor Montalvo, and Watch What Happens Live! alongside sprinter Gabby Thomas. He also appeared as a co-presenter with Olympians Caeleb Dressel and Ilona Maher, Paralympian Ezra Frech, and actors Brendan Hunt and Jane Lynch, at the 76th Primetime Emmy Awards.

Nedoroscik and his family appeared on the September 11, 2025 episode of Celebrity Family Feud where they competed against fellow 2024 Olympian Jordan Chiles and her family. Nedoroscik's family won and went on to win the grand prize of $25,000, which was donated to Penn State Health.

During the 2026 Winter Olympics, it was discovered that American curler Aidan Oldenburg bore a striking physical resemblance to Nedoroscik with the media dubbing them "doppelgängers" and noting they both have niche hobbies (Oldenburg being a juggler and Nedoroscik being a Rubik's Cube solver).

=== Dancing with the Stars ===
Nedoroscik was initially set to perform in the 2024 Gold Over America Tour, but withdrew to participate in season 33 of Dancing with the Stars. He was the first male gymnast to compete in the series, and was partnered with professional dancer Rylee Arnold. They reached the finale and finished in fourth place on November 26, 2024. Nedoroscik co-hosted the Dancing with the Stars: Live! tour in 2025, alongside professional dancer Emma Slater.

Week #	Dance / Song	Theme	Judges' scores				Result
Week #	Dance / Song	Theme	Inaba	Guest	Hough	Tonioli	Result
1	Jive / "Don't Stop Me Now"	Season Premiere	7	-	7	7	No elimination
2	Paso doble / "Superman Theme"	Oscars Night	8	-	7	7	Safe
3	Quickstep / "Superstition"	Soul Train	8	8	7 ^{1}	7	No elimination
4	Foxtrot / "Here I Go Again"	Hair Metal	8	8	8 ^{2}	8	Safe
5	Argentine tango / "7 Nation Army"	Dedication Night	8	8	9 ^{3}	8	Safe
6	Charleston / "A Star Is Born"; Team Freestyle (Team Roar) / "I Just Can't Wait to Be King"	Disney Night	8; 8	-	8; 8	8; 8	Safe
7	Contemporary / "I Ran (So Far Away)"	Halloween Nightmares	10	-	9	9	Safe
8	Viennese waltz / "Glimpse of Us"; Instant Jive / "Love Is Embarrassing"	500th Anniversary Celebration	10; 9	-	10; 8	9; 8	Safe
9	Cha-cha / "Bailar"; Tango / "Sweet Disposition"	Semifinals	8; 10	-	8; 9	9; 9	No elimination
10	Quickstep / "I'll Be There for You"; Freestyle / "Viva la Vida"	Finals	10; 10	-	9; 10	10; 10	4th place

^{1} Guest judge Rosie Perez
^{2} Guest judge Gene Simmons
^{3} Guest judge Mark Ballas

== Personal life ==
Nedoroscik resides in Sarasota, Florida. His height is reported to be between 5 ft 4 in (1.63 m) to 5 ft 5 in (1.65 m). He was in a relationship with retired gymnast Tess McCracken, who also competed for the Penn State Nittany Lions, from July 2016 until January 2026. They were college sweethearts, having met as incoming freshmen while participating in student-athlete orientation.

During broadcast competitions and appearances, Nedoroscik sends non-verbal greetings to his loved ones by gently tugging on his right ear. It originated as a signal to his grandfather and shares similarities to Carol Burnett's signature gesture at the end of every episode of her self-titled television series.

Nedoroscik has been described as humble and down-to-earth. Michael Meagher, one of his high school teachers, said, "I remember a story: Senior year, he's always in school, never missing a day, he's missed two or three in a row, and he came back to school. I said, 'Stephen, where the heck have you been?' And he said, 'I was at the Junior Olympics.' I said, 'come on ... doing what? He says, 'I'm in gymnastics and I competed in the pommel horse.' I said, 'well, how did you do?' He said 'I won,' so just like that, you would've never known this kid, not braggadocious, not talking a story, just going out and doing his thing."

Outside of gymnastics, Nedoroscik enjoys playing chess, video games—particularly Rocket League—solving sudoku, and the Rubik's Cube; for the latter, he has a personal record of 8.664 seconds. In May 2025 Nedoroscik participated in PogChamps 6, where he lost in the semi-finals to Eberechi Eze.

In July 2026, Nedoroscik served as the best man for Canadian Olympian and fellow Penn State gymnast Samuel Zakutney.

== Competitive history ==
Competitive history of Stephen Nedoroscik
Year	Event	Team	PH
2015	Junior Olympic National Championships (JO15)		1st place, gold medalist(s)
2016	Junior Olympic National Championships (JO16)		1st place, gold medalist(s)
2017	NCAA Championships		1st place, gold medalist(s)
2017	U.S. National Championships		7
2018	Winter Cup		4
2018	NCAA Championships	6	1st place, gold medalist(s)
2018	National Qualifier		3rd place, bronze medalist(s)
2018	U.S. National Championships		9
2019	Winter Cup		1st place, gold medalist(s)
2019	Doha World Cup		6
2019	NCAA Championships	6	2nd place, silver medalist(s)
2019	Summer Universiade		13
2019	U.S. National Championships		2nd place, silver medalist(s)
2019	Cottbus World Cup		8
2020	Melbourne World Cup		1st place, gold medalist(s)
2021	Winter Cup		2nd place, silver medalist(s)
2021	U.S. National Championships		1st place, gold medalist(s)
2021	Olympic Trials		3rd place, bronze medalist(s)
2021	World Team Trials		1st place, gold medalist(s)
2021	World Championships		1st place, gold medalist(s)
2022	U.S. Classic		1st place, gold medalist(s)
2022	U.S. National Championships		1st place, gold medalist(s)
2022	World Championships	5	5
2023	Winter Cup		3rd place, bronze medalist(s)
2023	U.S. Classic		1st place, gold medalist(s)
2023	U.S. National Championships		1st place, gold medalist(s)
2023	Pan American Games	1st place, gold medalist(s)	5
2024	Winter Cup		2nd place, silver medalist(s)
2024	Baku World Cup		1st place, gold medalist(s)
2024	U.S. National Championships		1st place, gold medalist(s)
2024	Olympic Trials		2nd place, silver medalist(s)
2024	Olympic Games	3rd place, bronze medalist(s)	3rd place, bronze medalist(s)
2025	U.S. National Championships		5
2026	National Qualifier		1st place, gold medalist(s)
2026	U.S. National Championships		5

== See also ==
- List of Pennsylvania State University Olympians
