= Kip Simons =

American artistic gymnast

- Simons in 2026

Personal information
- Full name: Kip Alexander Simons
- Born: September 11, 1972 (age 54) Media, Pennsylvania, U.S.

Gymnastics career
- Discipline: Men's artistic gymnastics
- Country represented: United States; (1993–1997)
- College team: Ohio State Buckeyes
- Head coaches: Peter Kormann; Miles Avery
- Awards: Nissen-Emery Award (1994)
Medal record
Men's artistic gymnastics
Representing United States
Event	1st	2nd	3rd
Pan American Games	1	0	0
Pacific Alliance Championships	1	1	0
Total	2	1	0
Pan American Games
Gold medal – first place	1995 Mar del Plata	Team
Pacific Alliance Championships
Gold medal – first place	1994 Auckland	Team
Silver medal – second place	1994 Auckland	Rings

Kip Alexander Simons (born September 11, 1972) is a retired American gymnast. He was a member of the United States men's national artistic gymnastics team and competed in the 1996 Olympics and the 1994 and 1995 World Championships.

== Biography ==
Simons competed for Ohio State University. In 1994, his senior year, Simons won the Nissen Award, the "Heisman" of men's gymnastics. Simons credited a hard summer of training between his junior and senior years with propelling him to the next level.

Simons has been the gymnastics head coach at the United States Naval Academy since 2015. Before his Naval Academy appointment, Kip was the Head Coach of the men's gymnastics team at the United States Air Force Academy for 11 seasons, beginning in 2005. He was an assistant coach at the University of California, Berkeley from 2001 to 2005.
