= Ed Scrobe =

American gymnast

- Full name: Edward Joseph Scrobe
- Born: January 26, 1923 New York City, New York, U.S.
- Died: November 24, 2017 (aged 94) Briarcliff Manor, New York, U.S.

Gymnastics career
- Discipline: Men's artistic gymnastics
- Country represented: United States
- Gym: D.A. Turnverein

Edward Joseph Scrobe (January 26, 1923 – November 24, 2017) was an American artistic gymnast who was a member of the United States men's national artistic gymnastics team and competed in the 1948 and 1952 Summer Olympics. He died in November 2017 at the age of 94.

As a gymnast, Scrobe was a member of D.A. Turnverein in New York City.
