= Jair Lynch =

American gymnast and real estate developer

- Lynch in 2026

Personal information
- Full name: Jair K. Lynch
- Born: October 2, 1971 (age 55) Amherst, Massachusetts, U.S.
- Height: 162 cm (5 ft 4 in)

Gymnastics career
- Discipline: Men's artistic gymnastics
- Country represented: United States; (1991–1997)
- College team: Stanford Cardinal
- Eponymous skills: Lynch (horizontal bar)
Medal record
Men's artistic gymnastics
Representing United States
Event	1st	2nd	3rd
Olympic Games	0	1	0
Total	0	1	0
Olympic Games
Silver medal – second place	1996 Atlanta	Parallel bars

Jair K. Lynch (born October 2, 1971) is an American gymnast and real estate developer in Washington, D.C., in the United States. He won a silver medal in the parallel bars at the 1996 Summer Olympics. After leaving competitive gymnastics, he became a real estate developer and founded Jair Lynch Development Partners in 1998.

== Early life and education ==
Lynch was born October 2, 1971, in Amherst, Massachusetts. His father, Acklyn Lynch, was born on the island of Trinidad in the Republic of Trinidad and Tobago, and his mother, Martha Fernandez Lynch, was born in Bogotá, Colombia.

The Lynch family moved to Washington, D.C. when Jair was three years old. Jair Lynch grew up in the Shepherd Park neighborhood of Washington, D.C., where he attended Alexander Shepherd Elementary School. He evinced an early interest in architecture, and at the age of three was already replicating famous buildings in the city using Play-Doh and covering tables with cities he would build from Legos (his favorite toy). Although he enjoyed basketball, football, and soccer as a youth, his short height (he topped out at 5 feet 4 inches (1.63 m)) (Note: Lynch's father is 5 feet 8 inches (1.73 m) tall, while his mother is 5 feet 2 inches (1.57 m) in height. Lynch's father knew that his son would never be very tall.) and lack of weight (just 135 pounds (61 kg) as an Olympic gymnast) mitigated against it. Yet he was extremely athletic.

Lynch graduated from Sidwell Friends School in Washington, D.C., and received a full-ride gymnastics scholarship from Stanford University.

== Gymnastics career ==
Lynch became involved with gymnastics at the age of eight. At the age of 12, he predicted that he was going to be an Olympic athlete someday. Lynch was plagued with injuries before he turned 18. These included a broken ankle, arm, finger, hand, and wrist (both of them). In 1985, he began training with coach Rick Tucker at the Gymnastics Plus club in Columbia, Maryland. His father drove him to every gymnastics meet. They would listen to jazz and hip-hop music and discuss art, music, and sports.

At the 1987 USA Gymnastics' Junior Olympics, Lynch won the pommel horse championship. The following year, he compiled the highest score ever at the Junior Olympics. He was the all-around men's champion at the meet in 1990.

=== College ===
At Stanford University, Lynch was a member and captain of the 1992 and 1993 teams that won the NCAA Men's Gymnastics championship. He was coached by Sadao Hamada and David Juszczyk.

He placed seventh in the all-around competition at the 1991 World Sports Fair.

=== Olympics ===
At the 1992 United States Gymnastics Olympic Trials, Lynch placed fourth in the all-around. Lynch became just the third African American to make the U.S. Olympic Team, and just the second to compete. (Note: In 1980, Ron Galimore was the first African American gymnast to make the U.S. Olympic Team. The American boycott of the 1980 Olympic Summer Games prevented him from competing. In 1988, Charles Lakes became the second African American to make the U.S. Olympic Team. He became the first African American gymnast to compete when he appeared at the 1988 Olympic Summer Games.) At the 1992 Summer Olympics, Lynch finished sixth in the parallel bar competition and 60th in the all-around. The U.S. men's gymnastics team finished sixth overall.

Lynch faced two major issues while preparing for the 1996 Olympic Summer Games. The first was a strength issue, which impaired his performance on the rings. The second was injuries. After the 1992 Games, he suffered a broken left hand, ruptured sternum, and torn right rotator cuff. Lynch sought out Fred Stephens, the strength coach for the Stanford University football team. With Stephens' help, Lynch significantly improved his upper body strength, which helped him to avoid further injury. Working with Sadao Hamada, coach for the 1992 men's Olympic gymnastics team, he developed routines that he felt more comfortable performing. At the American Cup gymnastics competition in early 1996, Lynch placed second. At the Coca-Cola National Championships, he placed first on the parallel bars. He finished sixth at the 1996 United States Gymnastics Olympic Trials after falling twice from the horizontal bar.

Lynch was elected captain of the 1996 U.S. men's gymnastics Olympic team. (Note: He was also the first African American to be captain of the U.S. men's gymnastics Olympic team.) At the 1996 Olympic Summer Games, he won a silver medal on the parallel bars, becoming the first African American man to win an individual Olympic medal in gymnastics and only the second American man to earn an individual Olympic medal in a non-boycott year since 1976.

=== Post-competition gymnastics ===
Beginning in 2004, Lynch started to serve on the board of directors of the United States Olympic Committee. He stepped down at the end of 2012.

== Eponymous skills ==
Lynch has one named element on the horizontal bar. It was initially given a D (0.4) difficulty score, but was lowered to a C (0.3) in 2022.

Gymnastics elements named after Jair Lynch
Apparatus	Name	Description	Difficulty (Note: Valid for the 2025–2028 Code of Points)	Added to Code of Points
Horizontal bar	Lynch	Tkatchev straddled with 1/2 t. to mix el-grip into back uprise to hdst	C, 0.3	Performed in 1992, but added to CoP in 2013.

== Business career ==
Lynch graduated from Stanford University in 1994 with a bachelor's degree in civil engineering and in urban design. He was nominated for a Rhodes scholarship upon graduation. In 2006, Lynch was a Loeb Fellow at the Harvard Graduate School of Design.

After graduating from Stanford, Lynch worked for three years in the real estate development arm of Silicon Graphics, a California-based computer company.

Lynch moved back to Washington, D.C., and founded Jair Lynch Development Partners, a Washington, D.C.–based real estate development firm in 1998. The company started out working on small projects such as community centers and low-income housing. In 2003, it won a contract to manage the District of Columbia Department of Parks and Recreation's $100 million capital investment program. The company received a $120 million investment from local real estate developer Victor MacFarlane in 2015, which allowed the firm to begin purchasing sites for development and to operate its assets. Lynch has stated that his firm is interested in developing neighborhoods around the buildings it develops to help build a stable population. As of 2015, the firm had developed 1,650,000 square feet (153,000 m^{2}) in and around the District of Columbia.

=== D.C. Olympic bids ===
Lynch was a member of the 2001 team which submitted the District of Columbia's bid for the 2012 Olympic Summer Games.

He was also a member of the 2014 team which submitted the District's bid for the 2024 Olympic Summer Games.

== Personal life ==
Lynch's lifelong role model is Jackie Robinson, the African American who broke down racial discrimination in baseball.

Lynch is married to television and film producer Jocelyn Sigue. The couple had a daughter, Pilar, in 2009.

== Bibliography ==
- Ravello, Carolina C. (2003). LeRoy Clarke: Of Flesh and Salt and Wind and Current. Port of Spain, Trinidad and Tobago: National Museum and Art Gallery of Trinidad and Tobago. ISBN 9789769510609.
