= Larry Banner =

American gymnast

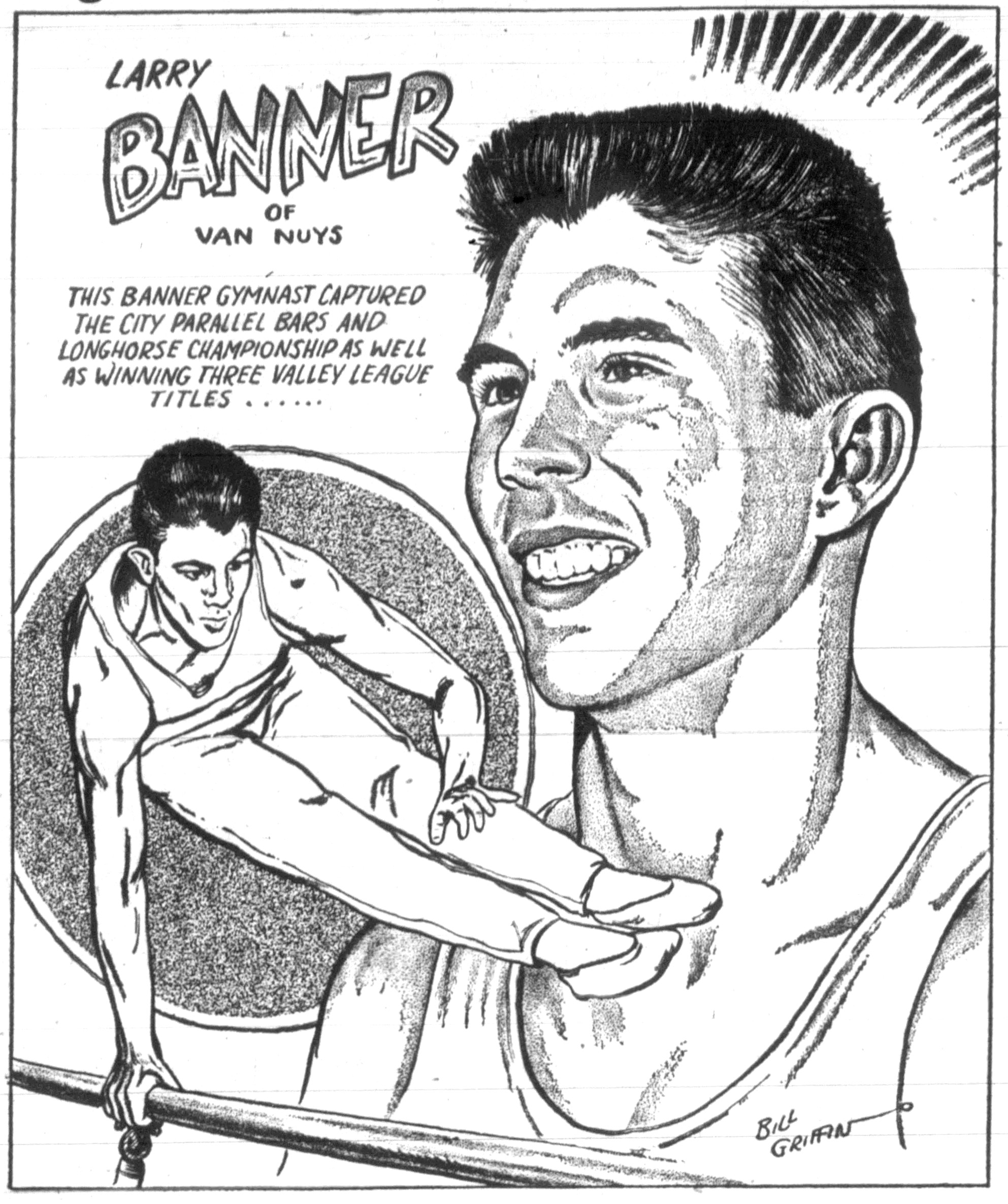
- A sketch of Banner from the Los Angeles Daily News in 1953.

Personal information
- Full name: Larry Shyres Banner
- Born: June 4, 1936 Van Nuys, California, U.S.
- Died: November 28, 2013 (aged 77) Modesto, California, U.S.
- Height: 1.80 m (5 ft 11 in)

Gymnastics career
- Discipline: Men's artistic gymnastics
- Country represented: United States
- College team: UCLA Bruins (1955–1957)
- Club: Los Angeles Turners
- Head coach: Ralph Borelli
- Former coaches: Al Arps; Barney Quinn
- Retired: c. 1964

Lawrence Shyres Banner (June 4, 1936 – November 28, 2013) was an American gymnast. He was a member of the United States men's national artistic gymnastics team and competed at the 1960 Summer Olympics and the 1964 Summer Olympics.

== Early life and education ==
Banner was born on June 4, 1936, in Van Nuys, California. At seven years old, he was diagnosed with polio which required the use of a wheelchair and later crutches. He continued to take special physical education classes until the 10th grade. Banner attended Van Nuys High School where he was able to participate in various sports, including gymnastics under coach Barney Quinn, by 11th grade. He excelled in gymnastics and later attended Los Angeles Valley College where he competed for their gymnastics team from 1954 to 1955 under coach Al Arps. He later enrolled at the University of California, Los Angeles to pursue gymnastics.

== Gymnastics career ==
While at student at UCLA, Banner was a member of the UCLA Bruins men's gymnastics team. He began competing for UCLA for the 1955-56 season as a junior. His last season with the Bruins was 1957.

== Post-gymnastics life ==
Banner was a teacher and taught for 16 years at Turlock High School. He curated the website, www.gymnasticshalloffame.org, which included detailed biographies of those influential to the sport where coverage from USA Gymnastics was lacking. Contributors to his research included fellow USA Gymnastics Hall of Famers Abie Grossfeld and Jerry Wright.

Banner died on November 28, 2013, in Modesto, California.
