= Artie Pitt =

American gymnast

- Full name: Arthur Elmer Pitt
- Born: August 14, 1913 West New York, New Jersey, U.S.
- Died: February 1, 2002 (aged 88) Teaneck, New Jersey, U.S.
- Height: 163 cm (5 ft 4 in)

Gymnastics career
- Discipline: Men's artistic gymnastics
- Country represented: United States
- College team: Iowa Hawkeyes
- Gym: Swiss Turnverein

Arthur Elmer "Artie" Pitt (August 14, 1913 – February 1, 2002) was an American gymnast. He was a member of the United States men's national artistic gymnastics team and competed in eight events at the 1936 Summer Olympics.

As a gymnast, Pitt was a member of Swiss Turnverein in Union City, New Jersey.
