= Sid Freudenstein =

American gymnast

- Full name: Sidney A. Freudenstein
- Born: May 18, 1945 (age 81) New Orleans, Louisiana, U.S.
- Height: 168 cm (5 ft 6 in)

Gymnastics career
- Discipline: Men's artistic gymnastics
- Country represented: United States
- College team: California Golden Bears

Sidney A. Freudenstein (born May 18, 1945) is an American gymnast and coach. A graduate of Anaheim High School, he won the CIF-Southern Section all-around champion as a senior. He was a member of the United States men's national artistic gymnastics team and competed in eight events at the 1968 Summer Olympics. Following the end of his competitive career, he became head coach at the University of Colorado.
