= Bill Tom =

American gymnast

- Tom in 1956

Personal information
- Full name: William Tom
- Born: March 15, 1923 San Francisco, California, U.S.
- Died: October 31, 2012 (aged 89) Eagle Rock, Los Angeles, California, U.S.
- Height: 165 cm (5 ft 5 in)

Gymnastics career
- Discipline: Men's artistic gymnastics
- Country represented: United States
- Gym: Los Angeles Turners

William Tom (March 15, 1923 – October 31, 2012) was an American gymnast. He won the 1949 National AAU Championships in the vault. He was a member of the United States men's national artistic gymnastics team and competed in eight events at the 1956 Summer Olympics.

Tom was born on March 15, 1923, in San Francisco. As a gymnast, Tom was a member of Los Angeles Turners.

He attended California State University, Los Angeles and earned B.A. and M.A. degrees before he joined Los Angeles Trade–Technical College as a teacher in 1963.

He was inducted into the U.S. Gymnastics Hall of Fame in 1992.

Tom lived in Eagle Rock, Los Angeles, for over 30 years and died at home on October 31, 2012.
