= Charles Simms (gymnast) =

American gymnast

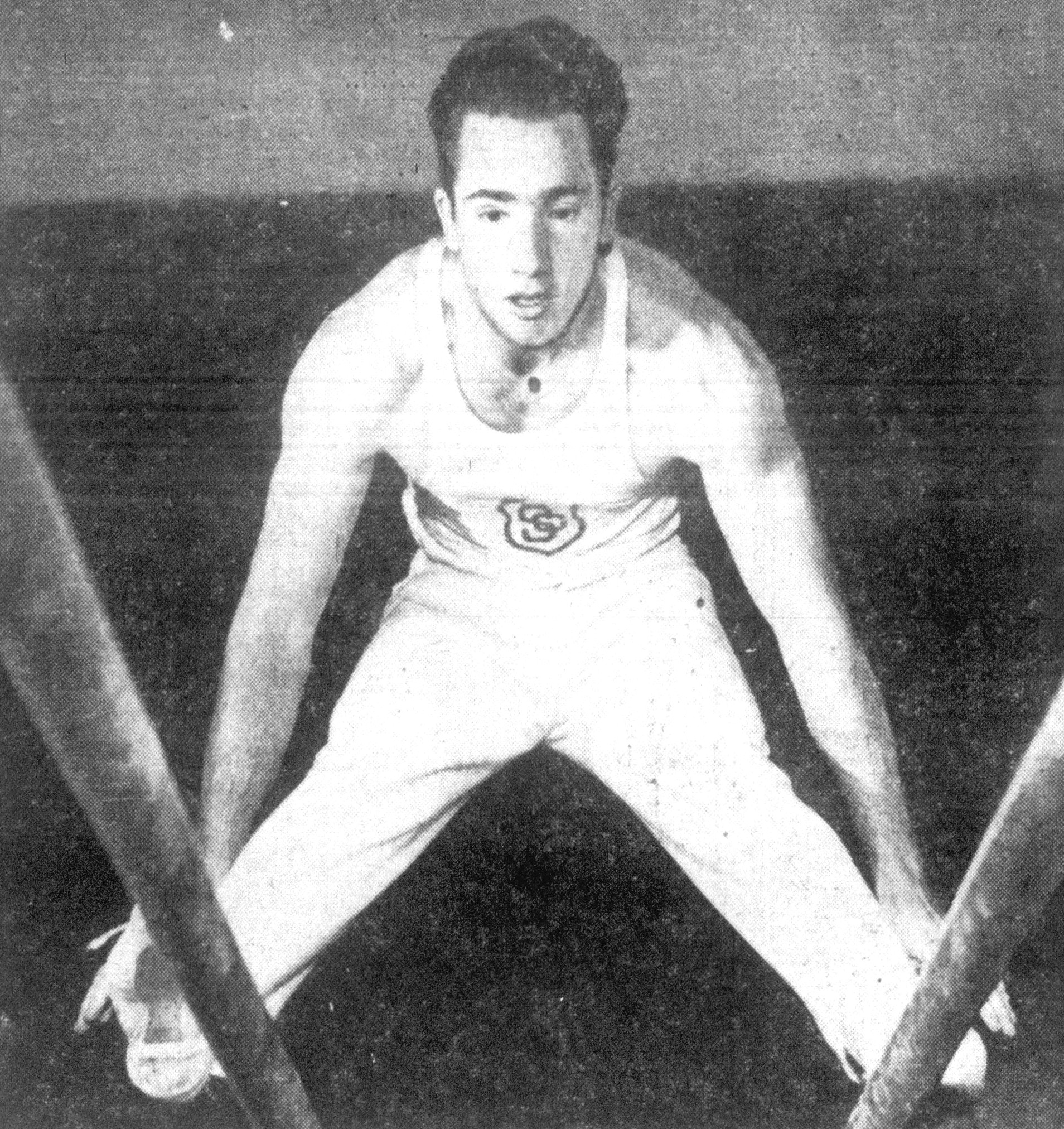
- Simms, circa 1950

Personal information
- Full name: Charles Otto Simms
- Born: January 24, 1928 New York City, New York, U.S.
- Died: October 10, 2003 (aged 75) North Hollywood, California, U.S.
- Height: 172 cm (5 ft 8 in)

Gymnastics career
- Discipline: Men's artistic gymnastics
- Country represented: United States
- College team: USC Trojans
- Gym: Los Angeles Turners
Medal record
Representing USC Trojans
Event	1st	2nd	3rd
NCAA Championships	1	0	0
Total	1	0	0
NCAA Championships
Gold medal – first place	1952 Boulder	Horizontal bar

Charles Otto Simms (January 24, 1928 – October 10, 2003) was an American gymnast. He was a member of the United States men's national artistic gymnastics team and competed at the 1952 Summer Olympics and the 1956 Summer Olympics.

As a gymnast, Simms was a member of Los Angeles Turners. In 1952, while a member of the USC Trojans men's gymnastics team, Simms was the NCAA Champion on the horizontal bar.
