= Wayne Young =

American gymnast

- Full name: Wayne Robert Young
- Born: June 1, 1952 (age 74) Westwood, California, U.S.
- Height: 165 cm (5 ft 5 in)

Gymnastics career
- Discipline: Men's artistic gymnastics
- Country represented: United States
- College team: BYU Cougars

Wayne Robert Young (born June 1, 1952) is an American former gymnast. He was a member of the United States men's national artistic gymnastics team and competed in eight events at the 1976 Summer Olympics. He is the father of Olympian Guard Young.
