= Curt Rottman =

American gymnast

- Full name: Curt Rudolf Paul Rottmann
- Born: February 13, 1886 Dresden, German Empire
- Died: January 13, 1928 (aged 41) New York City, New York, U.S.

Gymnastics career
- Discipline: Men's artistic gymnastics
- Country represented: United States
- Gym: New York Turnverein

Curt Rudolf Paul Rottmann (February 13, 1886, in Dresden – January 13, 1928, in New York City) was an American gymnast. He was a member of the United States men's national artistic gymnastics team and competed in the 1924 Summer Olympics.

Upon arriving in the United States, Rottman lived in Baltimore, Philadelphia, and California before settling in New York. As a gymnast, he was a member of Baltimore Turnverein Vorwaerts, Philadelphia Turngemeinde, and New York Turnverein.

Rottman worked as a baker and confectioner and died of pleural pneumonia on January 13, 1928, at Lenox Hill Hospital in Manhattan, New York City.
