= George Wheeler (gymnast) =

American gymnast

- Full name: George Edward Wheeler
- Born: December 14, 1914 Pittsburgh, Pennsylvania, U.S.
- Died: July 8, 1990 (aged 75) New York City, New York, U.S.

Gymnastics career
- Discipline: Men's artistic gymnastics
- Country represented: United States
- Gym: First United Presbyterian Community House

George Edward Wheeler (December 14, 1914 – July 8, 1990) was an American gymnast. He was a member of the United States men's national artistic gymnastics team and competed in eight events at the 1936 Summer Olympics.

As a gymnast, he was a member of First United Presbyterian Community House.
