= Steve Cohen (gymnast) =

American gymnast (born 1946)

- Full name: Stephen Robert Cohen
- Born: April 28, 1946 (age 80) Philadelphia, Pennsylvania, U.S.
- Height: 170 cm (5 ft 7 in)

Gymnastics career
- Discipline: Men's artistic gymnastics
- Country represented: United States
- College team: Penn State Nittany Lions

Stephen Robert Cohen (born April 28, 1946) is an American former gymnast. He competed in eight events at the 1968 Summer Olympics.

Cohen is a native of Philadelphia, Pennsylvania, living in the Wynnefield neighborhood. Cohen attended West Philadelphia High School, where he started gymnastics, and later competed for the Penn State Nittany Lions men's gymnastics team.

At the 1965 Maccabiah Games in Israel, he won four gold medals, four silver medals, and two bronze medals.

In 1998, Cohen was inducted into the Philadelphia Jewish Sports Hall of Fame.
