= John Mais (gymnast) =

American artistic gymnast

- Full name: John Charles Mais
- Born: January 17, 1888 Philadelphia, Pennsylvania, U.S.
- Died: August 8, 1974 (aged 86) Bryn Mawr, Pennsylvania, U.S.
- Height: 164 cm (5 ft 5 in)

Gymnastics career
- Discipline: Men's artistic gymnastics
- Country represented: United States
- Gym: Philadelphia Turngemeinde

John Charles Mais (January 17, 1888 – August 8, 1974) was an American gymnast. He was a member of the United States men's national artistic gymnastics team and competed in the 1920 Summer Olympics and in the 1924 Summer Olympics. He was born in Philadelphia. He worked for Southern Railway for over 50 years before dying on August 8, 1974, in Bryn Mawr, Pennsylvania.

As a gymnast, Mais was a member of Philadelphia Turngemeinde, also known as Philadelphia Turners.
