= John Pearson (gymnast) =

American gymnast (1902–1984)

- Full name: John Bartling Pearson, Jr.
- Born: January 30, 1902 Waukesha, Wisconsin, U.S.
- Died: April 23, 1984 (aged 82) Los Angeles, California, U.S.
- Height: 178 cm (5 ft 10 in)

Gymnastics career
- Discipline: Men's artistic gymnastics
- Country represented: United States

John Bartling Pearson, Jr. (January 30, 1902 – April 23, 1984) was an American gymnast. He was a member of the United States men's national artistic gymnastics team and competed in the 1924 Summer Olympics and 1928 Summer Olympics.
