= Joseph Hagerty =

American artistic gymnast (born 1982)

- Full name: Joseph Hagerty
- Born: April 19, 1982 (age 44) Albuquerque, New Mexico, U.S.
- Height: 163 cm (5 ft 4 in)

Gymnastics career
- Discipline: Men's artistic gymnastics
- Country represented: United States; (2005–2011)
- Gym: USOTC; Team Chevron; Gold Cup Gymnastics
- Head coach: Vitaly Marinich
- Assistant coach: Alex Shchennokov
- Retired: 2011
Medal record
Men's artistic gymnastics
Representing United States
Event	1st	2nd	3rd
Olympic Games	0	0	1
Pan American Games	0	0	1
Pan American Championships	1	0	1
Total	1	0	3
Olympic Games
Bronze medal – third place	2008 Beijing	Team
Pan American Games
Bronze medal – third place	2007 Rio de Janeiro	Team
Pan American Championships
Gold medal – first place	2005 Rio de Janeiro	Team
Bronze medal – third place	2005 Rio de Janeiro	Horizontal bar

Joseph Hagerty (born April 19, 1982, in Albuquerque, New Mexico) is an American artistic gymnast. He is the 2008 U.S. national champion on the horizontal bar and the 2008 all-around bronze medalist. He was a member of the United States men's national artistic gymnastics team and won an Olympic bronze medal at the 2008 Summer Olympics.

== Gymnastics career ==
A native of Rio Rancho, New Mexico, Hagerty was coached by Ed Burch, owner of Gold Cup Gymnastics in Albuquerque, NM. Hagerty trained at the U.S. Olympic Training Center in Colorado Springs, Colorado.

In March 2011, Hagerty announced his retirement from gymnastics.

== Personal life ==
He is now performing as one of the Tumble Monkeys in the Festival of the Lion King at Disney's Animal Kingdom in Walt Disney World.
