= Chet Phillips =

American gymnast (1913–1988)

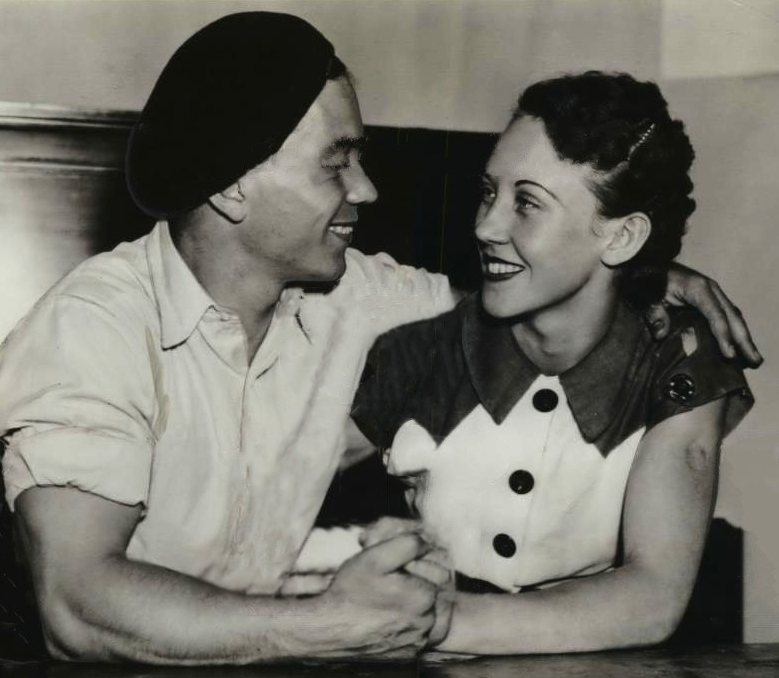
- Chet Phillips and Marie Kibler in 1936

Personal information
- Full name: Chester Wilson Phillips
- Born: October 23, 1913 Philadelphia, Pennsylvania, U.S.
- Died: October 7, 1988 (aged 74) Lakeland, Florida, U.S.
- Spouse: Marie Kibler

Gymnastics career
- Discipline: Men's artistic gymnastics
- Country represented: United States
- College team: Temple Owls

Chester Wilson "Chet" Phillips (October 23, 1913 – October 7, 1988) was an American gymnast. He was a member of the United States men's national artistic gymnastics team and competed in eight events at the 1936 Summer Olympics.

As a gymnast, Phillips was a member of the Temple Owls men's gymnastics team. He married Marie Kibler, an Olympic gymnast with him at the 1936 Summer Olympics.
