= Kevin Tan =

American artistic gymnast

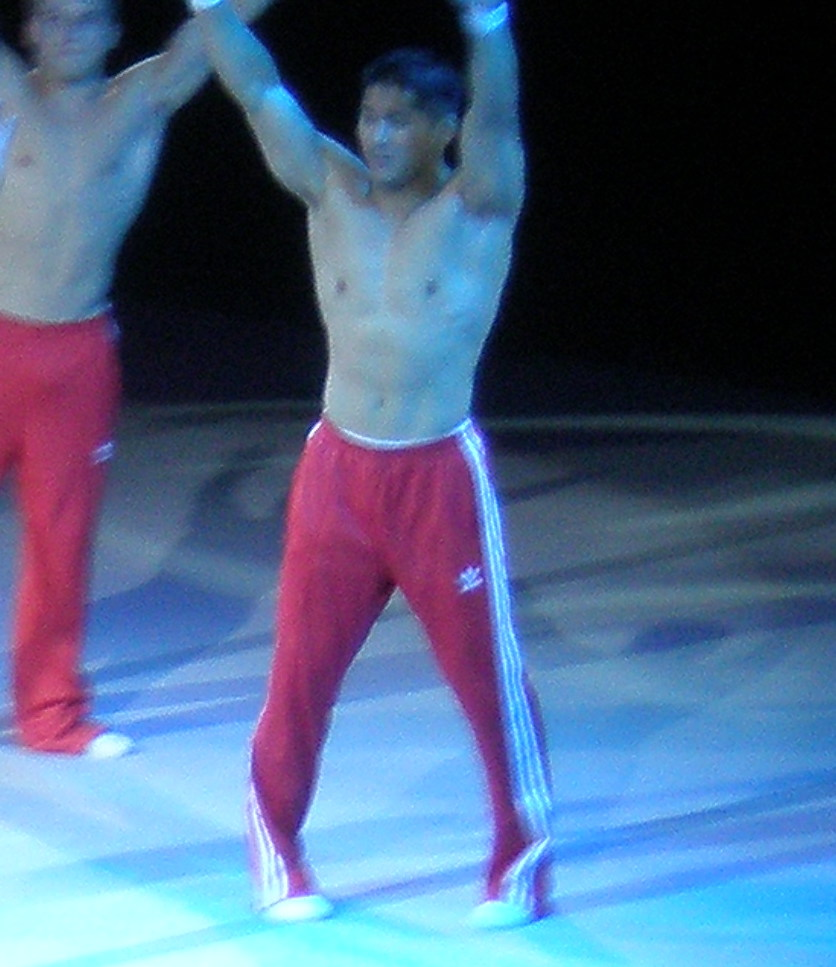
- Tan in 2008 at The Tour of Gymnastics Superstars

Personal information
- Full name: Kai-Wen Tan
- Born: September 24, 1981 (age 44) Fremont, California, U.S.
- Height: 5 ft 4 in (163 cm)

Gymnastics career
- Discipline: Men's artistic gymnastics
- Country represented: United States (2006–2010)
- College team: Penn State Nittany Lions
- Gym: Team Chevron
- Head coach: Randy Jepson
- Assistant coach: Slava Boiko
Medal record
Men's artistic gymnastics
Representing United States
Event	1st	2nd	3rd
Olympic Games	0	0	1
Total	0	0	1
Olympic Games
Bronze medal – third place	2008 Beijing	Team

Kai-Wen "Kevin" Tan (simplified Chinese: 谭凯文; traditional Chinese: 譚凱文; pinyin: Tán Kǎiwén; born September 24, 1981) is an American artistic gymnast. He is a former member of the United States men's national artistic gymnastics team and won an Olympic bronze medal at the 2008 Summer Olympics.

== Early life and education ==
Tan was born on September 24, 1981, in Fremont, California. He graduated from Mission San Jose High School, Class of 2000.

== Gymnastics career ==
At Penn State, Tan was a six-time All-American. He won the NCAA team championship as a senior in 2004 and won the individual titles in still rings in 2003 and 2004, thus becoming Penn State's first back-to-back NCAA champion on the still rings. He also earned All-American honors on the parallel bars (2002) and horizontal bar (2003) during his career.

Following his graduation, he began working as an assistant coach of the Penn State men's gymnastics team.

Tan was a member of the 2005, 2006, and 2007 U.S. teams to the World Gymnastics Championships and is a 3-time U.S. national champion in the still rings, his specialty.

Tan was named to the 2008 Olympic team and was selected as captain of the team. Tan did not qualify for the event final for his signature event the rings. During the finals on the last event the pommel horse, Tan scored 12.755. Fellow team member and original alternate Alexander Artemev secured the bronze medal with a score of 15.350.

== See also ==
- List of Pennsylvania State University Olympians
