= Vincent D'Autorio =

American gymnast (1915–2008)

- Full name: Vincent John D'Autorio
- Born: October 1, 1915 Newark, New Jersey, U.S.
- Died: September 10, 2008 (aged 92) Sarasota, Florida, U.S.
- Height: 163 cm (5 ft 4 in)

Gymnastics career
- Discipline: Men's artistic gymnastics
- Country represented: United States
- Gym: Swiss Gymnastic Society

Vincent John D'Autorio (October 1, 1915 – September 10, 2008) was an American gymnast. He was a member of the United States men's national artistic gymnastics team and competed at the 1948 Summer Olympics and the 1952 Summer Olympics.

== Gymnastics career ==
As a gymnast, D'Autorio was a member of the Swiss Gymnastic Society of Union City, New Jersey.

He qualified for the 1940 United States Olympic gymnastic team, however the 1940 Summer Olympics were not held due to World War II. Following the conclusion of the war, he qualified for and participated in the 1948 Summer Olympics and 1952 Summer Olympics. D'Autorio was a 1949 national YMCA All-American.

== Later life ==
During World War II, D'Autorio served in the Navy. He later taught collegiate gymnastics at Panzer College from 1952 to 1954. Additionally, he was involved with coaching gymnastics at the youth level and officiated. He was named to the Helms Hall of Fame in 1971 and inducted as part of the class of 1972. In 1979, he was inducted to the NGJA Frank J. Cumiskey Judging Hall of Fame.

D'Autorio died of leukemia on September 10, 2008, in Sarasota, Florida.
