= Peter Kormann =

American artistic gymnast

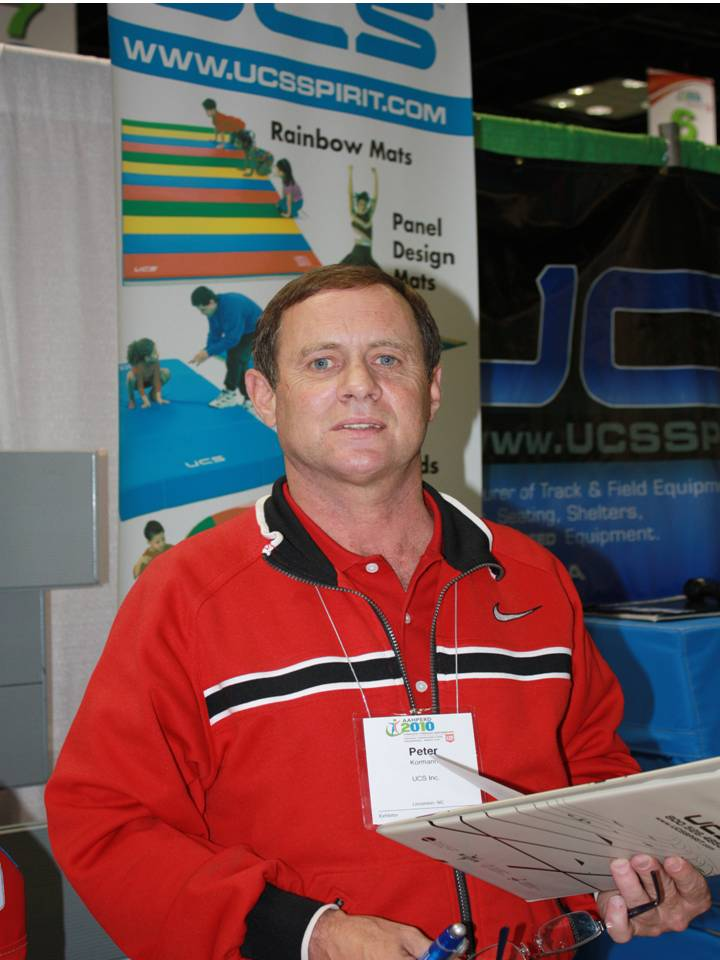
- Kormann in 2010

Personal information
- Full name: Peter Martin Kormann
- Born: June 21, 1955 (age 71) Braintree, Massachusetts, U.S.
- Height: 170 cm (5 ft 7 in)

Gymnastics career
- Discipline: Men's artistic gymnastics
- Country represented: United States
- College team: Southern Connecticut State Owls
Medal record
Men's artistic gymnastics
Representing United States
Event	1st	2nd	3rd
Olympic Games	0	0	1
Pan American Games	2	0	0
Total	2	0	1
Olympic Games
Bronze medal – third place	1976 Montreal	Floor
Pan American Games
Gold medal – first place	1975 Mexico City	Team
Gold medal – first place	1975 Mexico City	Floor

Peter Martin Kormann (born June 21, 1955) is an American retired gymnast and gymnastics coach. He was a member of the United States men's national artistic gymnastics team. At the 1976 Olympics, he became the first American to medal in a competition against the Soviets when he won a bronze medal in the men's floor competition. Kormann's bronze medal was also the first individual Olympic medal of any type won by an American gymnast in 44 years.

Kormann competed for Southern Connecticut State University under coach Abie Grossfeld. In 1977, Kormann won the Nissen Award (the "Heisman" of men's gymnastics). Peter went on to coach at the United States Naval Academy, the Ohio State University and was named head coach of the USA men's team from 1996 to 2001.

Kormann currently owns Yellow Jackets Gymnastics with his two sons in Massachusetts.
