= Art Shurlock =

American gymnast (1937–2022)

- Full name: Arthur David Shurlock
- Born: September 8, 1937 Chicago, Illinois, U.S.
- Died: May 14, 2022 (aged 84) Los Angeles, California, U.S.
- Height: 176 cm (5 ft 9 in)

Gymnastics career
- Discipline: Men's artistic gymnastics
- Country represented: United States
- College team: California Golden Bears
- Gym: Los Angeles Turners

Arthur David Shurlock (September 8, 1937 – May 14, 2022) was an American gymnast. He was a member of the United States men's national artistic gymnastics team and competed in eight events at the 1964 Summer Olympics.

Shurlock died on May 14, 2022, at the age of 84.
