= 2026 Big Ten Men's Gymnastics Championships =

2026 Big Ten men's gymnastics championship

The 2026 Big Ten Men's Gymnastics Championships was held on April 3–4, 2026, hosted by the University of Nebraska–Lincoln at the Pinnacle Bank Arena in Lincoln, Nebraska. Team and all-around competitions were held on April 3 and individual event finals on April 4.

Michigan won its sixth consecutive Big Ten title, claiming its 23rd title in program history. Fred Richard claimed his fourth consecutive Big Ten all-around title, the second gymnast to do so since Minnesota's John Roethlisberger in 1990–93.

Both days of competition will be televised live on the Big Ten Network starting at 7p.m.CT, while also available through the FOX Sports app.

== Championship ==
All five conference teams participated in the team championship.

The top 10 highest individual scores on each apparatus advanced to the individual event finals.

=== Final Team Results ===
Rank	Team	Floor (gymnastics)	Pommel horse	Rings (gymnastics)	Vault (gymnastics)	Parallel bars	Horizontal bar	Total
1st place, gold medalist(s)	Michigan	54.800	52.850	52.400	56.200	54.200	53.050	323.500
2nd place, silver medalist(s)	Nebraska	52.950	53.000	52.850	55.700	52.500	53.700	320.700
3rd place, bronze medalist(s)	Illinois	52.300	52.450	51.000	55.200	52.800	52.950	316.700
4	Ohio State	53.500	52.800	50.500	54.050	51.000	52.950	314.800
5	Penn State	50.100	50.350	51.500	55.600	52.000	51.300	310.850

=== All-Around ===
Rank	Gymnast	Team	Floor (gymnastics)	Pommel horse	Rings (gymnastics)	Vault (gymnastics)	Parallel bars	Horizontal bar	Total
1st place, gold medalist(s)	Fred Richard	Michigan	13.700	13.200	13.450	13.750	14.150	13.050	81.300
2nd place, silver medalist(s)	Max Odden	Nebraska	13.050	12.950	13.150	12.900	12.400	13.550	78.000
3rd place, bronze medalist(s)	Kellen Ryan	Penn State	12.900	11.100	12.750	14.100	12.600	13.250	76.700
4	David Ramirez	Ohio State	12.750	13.650	12.400	13.400	13.400	10.800	76.400
5	Garrett Schooley	Illinois	13.200	10.150	13.150	14.300	12.700	12.750	76.250
6	Landon Simpson	Penn State	12.800	11.850	12.000	13.700	12.300	11.550	74.200

== Individual medalists ==
=== Medalists ===
Event	Gold	Silver	Bronze
Floor Exercise	Chase Davenport-Mills (Ohio State)	Jacob Harmon (Ohio State)	Luke James (Nebraska)
Pommel Horse	Brandon Dang (Illinois)	Parker Thackston (Ohio State)	Aaronson Mansberger (Michigan)
Still Rings	Asher Cohen (Nebraska)	Akshay Puri (Michigan) Matthew Underhill (Penn State)	Not awarded
Vault	Chase Pappas (Michigan)	Garrett Schooley (Illinois)	Luke James (Nebraska)
Parallel Bars	Nathan York (Nebraska)	Caden Clinton (Nebraska)	Pierce Wolfgang (Michigan)
Horizontal Bar	Carson Eshleman (Michigan)	Sam Phillips (Illinois) Pierce Wolfgang (Michigan)	Not awarded
