= Billy Paul (gymnast) =

American artistic gymnast

- Born: 1959 or 1960 (age 66–67) Fort Bragg, North Carolina, U.S.
- Height: 5 ft 7 in (170 cm)

Gymnastics career
- Discipline: Men's artistic gymnastics
- Country represented: United States (c. 1981–1988)
- College team: California Golden Bears (1979–1982)
- Head coach: Hal Frey
- Assistant coaches: Chuck Keeney; Tom Beach
- Retired: c. 1988
Medal record
Men's artistic gymnastics
Representing United States
Event	1st	2nd	3rd
Pan American Games	0	1	1
Total	0	1	1
Pan American Games
Silver medal – second place	1983 Caracas	Team
Bronze medal – third place	1983 Caracas	Horizontal bar

Billy Paul (born 1959 or 1960) is a retired American artistic gymnast. He was a member of the United States men's national artistic gymnastics team and won two medals, a team silver and an individual bronze on the horizontal bar, at the 1983 Pan American Games. He was the 1988 United States men's vault champion.

== Early life and education ==
Paul was born in 1959 or 1960 at Fort Bragg, North Carolina. His hometown was Millbrae, California, and he started competing in gymnastics in 1973. He attended Mills High School, where he was a decorated gymnast and the northern California state high school champion. He later enrolled at the University of California, Berkeley.

== Gymnastics career ==
While a student at UC Berkeley, Paul was a member of the California Golden Bears men's gymnastics team. He competed for the Golden Bears from 1979 to 1982 and was named the Pac-10 Conference Gymnast of the Year. He was a finalist for the 1982 Nissen-Emery Award. He was the only American, and of a small number of gymnasts worldwide, to use a triple somersault dismount on the horizontal bar.

While in college, Paul was first named to the United States men's national artistic gymnastics team in 1981. He represented the United States at the 1983 Pan American Games, where he won a silver medal in the team all-around and an individual bronze medal on the horizontal bar.

After Sho Fukushima replaced Hal Frey as the Cal Golden Bears' men's gymnastics head coach, Paul joined Fukushima's staff as an assistant coach in 1984. Later that year at the 1984 United States Olympic trials, Paul placed 11th in the all-around with a score of 74.305, and as a result, he was not named to the Olympic team. The following year, Paul won six medals at the 1985 U.S. National Sports Festival in Baton Rouge, Louisiana, including floor and vault gold medals. He was later named as an alternate for the United States team at the 1985 World Artistic Gymnastics Championships.

Foregoing job offers, Paul continued to attempt to earn a berth on a United States Olympic team. At the 1988 U.S. National Gymnastics Championships, Paul shared the vaulting national championship with the reigning champion, John Sweeney. As a result of his performance at the championships, Paul qualified for the 1988 United States Olympic trials, one that likely was to be his last. His performance at the trials did not earn a top-7 place and he was not named to the team. He also ended his tenure as an assistant coach at Cal in 1988.

== Sources ==
- "2026 California Men's Gymnastics Record Book" (PDF). California Golden Bears. 2026.
