= Gymnastics at the 1967 Pan American Games =

Gymnastics events were competed at the 1967 Pan American Games in Winnipeg, Canada.

== Medal table ==
* Host nation (Canada)

| Rank | NOC | Gold | Silver | Bronze | Total |
|---|---|---|---|---|---|
| 1 | United States | 11 | 9 | 10 | 30 |
| 2 | Cuba | 2 | 2 | 2 | 6 |
| 3 | Mexico | 1 | 2 | 3 | 6 |
| 4 | Canada* | 1 | 1 | 1 | 3 |
| Totals (4 entries) | | 15 | 14 | 16 | 45 |

== Medalists ==
=== Men's events ===
| Event | Gold | Silver | Bronze |
|---|---|---|---|
| Individual all-around | Fred Roethlisberger; United States | Fernando Valles; Mexico | David Thor; United States |
| Team all-around | United States; Fred Roethlisberger; David Thor; Mark Cohn; Arno Lascari; Robert Emery; Richard Lloyd | Cuba; Hector Ramirez; Octavio Suarez; Jorge Rodríguez; Andres Gonzalez; Luís Hernandes; Carlos Garcia | Mexico; Armando Valles; Armando Garcia; Fernando Valles; Rogelio Mendoza; Enrique Garcia; Enrique Salazar |
| Floor exercise | Hector Ramírez; Cuba | Richard Lloyd; United States | Armando García; Mexico David Thor; United States |
| Horizontal bar | Fred Roethlisberger; United States | Fernando Valles; Mexico | David Thor; United States |
| Parallel bars | Richard Lloyd; United States Fred Roethlisberger; United States | — | Arno Lascari; United States |
| Pommel horse | Mark Cohn; United States | Richard Lloyd; United States | David Thor; United States |
| Rings | Fernando Valles; Mexico | Mark Cohn; United States Fred Roethlisberger; United States | — |
| Vault | Jorge Rodríguez; Cuba | Octavio Suárez; Cuba | Roger Dion; Canada Rogelio Mendoza; Mexico Fred Roethlisberger; United States |

=== Women's events ===
| Event | Gold | Silver | Bronze |
|---|---|---|---|
| Individual all-around | Linda Metheny; United States | Joyce Tanac; United States | Kathy Gleason; United States |
| Team all-around | United States; Linda Metheny; Joyce Tanac; Kathy Gleason; Marie Walther; Donna Schaenzer; Deborah Bailey | Canada; Susan McDonnell; Sandra Hartley; Marilynn Minaker; Glenna Sebestyen; Suzanne Cloutier; Dianne Masse | Cuba; Zulema Bregado; Nancy Aldama; Manuela Ponce; Yolanda Vega; Yolanda Williams; Julia Uría |
| Balance beam | Linda Metheny; United States | Deborah Bailey; United States | Zulema Bregado; Cuba |
| Floor exercise | Linda Metheny; United States | Joyce Tanac; United States | Donna Schaenzer; United States |
| Uneven bars | Susan McDonnell; Canada | Linda Metheny; United States | Kathy Gleason; United States |
| Vault | Linda Metheny; United States | Donna Schaenzer; United States | Marie Walther; United States |

== See also ==
- Pan American Gymnastics Championships
- South American Gymnastics Championships
- Gymnastics at the 1968 Summer Olympics
