= 2026 NCAA men's gymnastics championship =

Men's Gymnastics Championship

2026 NCAA Men's Gymnastics Championships
- Venue: State Farm Center
- Location: Champaign, Illinois
- Date: April 17–18, 2026
- Competitors: Oklahoma; Michigan; Stanford; Nebraska; Ohio State; Penn State; Illinois; California; Greenville; Navy; Army West Point; Springfield
- Winning score: 329.825

Champion
- Stanford

The 2026 NCAA men's gymnastics championships was hosted by the University of Illinois Urbana-Champaign at the State Farm Center in Champaign, Illinois on April 17–18, 2026.

Stanford won their 11th national championship.

== Championship Qualifiers ==
=== Team Qualifiers ===
- (H) = Hosts
- ^{(DC)} = Defending champions
- ^{(D3)} = Division III program

The NCAA Men's Gymnastics Committee announced the 12 teams for two pre-qualifying sessions which will be held on April 17. The top three teams from each session will move on to the National Championship.

- Oklahoma (328.150)
- Michigan (324.250) ^{(DC)}
- Stanford (322.988)
- Nebraska (320.963)
- Ohio State (317.863)
- Penn State (315.375)
- Illinois (315.075) (H)
- California(314.913)
- Greenville (311.325)^{(D3)}
- Navy (310.850)
- Army (309.963)
- Springfield (308.500)^{(D3)}

=== Session I ===
| Team | Floor (gymnastics) | Pommel horse | Rings (gymnastics) | Vault (gymnastics) | Parallel bars | Horizontal bar | Total |
|---|---|---|---|---|---|---|---|
| Oklahoma | 52.499 | 54.499 | 53.399 | 56.498 | 53.732 | 52.198 | 322.825 |
| Nebraska | 53.232 | 54.199 | 53.132 | 56.065 | 51.400 | 52.031 | 320.059 |
| Ohio State | 53.098 | 54.566 | 51.599 | 55.033 | 52.199 | 53.799 | 320.294 |
| California | 53.866 | 50.799 | 52.766 | 53.932 | 49.965 | 51.698 | 312.026 (-1.0 ND) |
| Greenville | 51.099 | 52.365 | 49.799 | 52.733 | 52.231 | 48.832 | 307.059 |
| Springfield | 50.532 | 51.866 | 50.699 | 53.798 | 50.199 | 49.332 | 306.426 |

=== Session II ===
| Team | Floor (gymnastics) | Pommel horse | Rings (gymnastics) | Vault (gymnastics) | Parallel bars | Horizontal bar | Total |
|---|---|---|---|---|---|---|---|
| Michigan | 53.765 | 52.898 | 52.365 | 55.799 | 54.665 | 55.131 | 324.623 |
| Stanford | 54.399 | 53.032 | 54.599 | 56.699 | 54.699 | 54.564 | 327.992 |
| Penn State | 51.698 | 52.698 | 51.198 | 54.966 | 52.165 | 48.632 | 311.357 |
| Illinois | 51.231 | 55.532 | 53.265 | 55.366 | 54.199 | 50.065 | 319.658 |
| Navy | 52.566 | 51.499 | 49.432 | 53.465 | 51.232 | 48.532 | 306.726 |
| Army | 51.299 | 51.299 | 48.966 | 53.799 | 51.631 | 51.332 | 308.593 |

=== Individual Qualifiers ===
| All-Around | Floor (gymnastics) | Pommel horse | Rings (gymnastics) | Vault (gymnastics) | Parallel bars | Horizontal bar |
|---|---|---|---|---|---|---|
| Luke Tully (William & Mary) | Braxton Jones (Simpson) | Sam Brown (Air Force) | Brian Rollison (Simpson) | Braxton Jones (Simpson) | Tai Gopaul (Air Force) | |
| Noah Doiron (Simpson) | Niko Greenly (William & Mary) | Jack Matlock (Air Force) | Jonathan Irwin (William & Mary) | Jack Foltyn (Air Force) | | Paul Tiedemann (Simpson) |
| Jared Fry (Air Force) | Tai Gopaul (Air Force) | William Bacus (Simpson) | Alex Campbell (Simpson) | Niko Greenly (William & Mary) | | Ricky Pizem (William & Mary) |
| | Garrett Alexander (Simpson) | | Oskar Silverman (Simpson) | Ricky Pizem (William & Mary) | Nicholas Kosarikov (William & Mary) | Evan Wilkins (William & Mary) |
| | Michael Weiner (William & Mary) | Gavin Zborowski (William & Mary) | | Isaac Koo (Air Force) | Palmer Wright (Air Force) | |

Alternates: Floor Exercise: Isaac Koo (William & Mary), Jake Smith (Simpson); Pommel: Ricky Pizem (William & Mary), Samuel Smith (William & Mary); Still Rings: Tai Gopaul (Air Force), Ryan Jacobson (Air Force); Vault: Jake Smith (Simpson), Milo Staley (Simpson); Parallel Bars: Evan Wilkins (William & Mary) , Kenny Rabe (Air Force); Horizontal Bar: Evan Sikra (William & Mary), Brian Rollison (Simpson), Jake Smith (Simpson)

== NCAA Championship ==
The top three teams from each Qualifying Session (Session 1: Oklahoma, Ohio State, Nebraska; Session 2: Stanford, Michigan, Illinois) competed for the National Championship on April 18. It was aired on ESPN2.

=== Results ===
| Rank | Team | Floor (gymnastics) | Pommel horse | Rings (gymnastics) | Vault (gymnastics) | Parallel bars | Horizontal bar | Total |
|---|---|---|---|---|---|---|---|---|
| 1st place, gold medalist(s) | Stanford | 55.365 | 51.998 | 55.199 | 56.266 | 56.432 | 54.565 | 329.825 |
| 1st place, gold medalist(s) | Arun Chhetri | | 13.433 | 13.100 | | 13.633 | | 329.825 |
| 1st place, gold medalist(s) | Zach Green | | | | | 14.066 | 13.733 | 329.825 |
| 1st place, gold medalist(s) | Asher Hong | | 12.933 | 14.300 | 14.033 | 14.400 | | 329.825 |
| 1st place, gold medalist(s) | Jun Iwai | 12.933 | | | 14.433 | | 13.066 | 329.825 |
| 1st place, gold medalist(s) | Cooper Kim | 14.466 | | | 14.100 | | 14.000 | 329.825 |
| 1st place, gold medalist(s) | Nick Kuebler | 14.166 | | 14.166 | | | 13.766 | 329.825 |
| 1st place, gold medalist(s) | Reece Landsperger | | | 13.633 | | | | 329.825 |
| 1st place, gold medalist(s) | Kiran Mandava | | 13.166 | | | | | 329.825 |
| 1st place, gold medalist(s) | Wade Nelson | | | | 13.700 | | | 329.825 |
| 1st place, gold medalist(s) | Marcus Pietarinen | 13.800 | 12.466 | | | | | 329.825 |
| 1st place, gold medalist(s) | David Shamah | | | | | 14.333 | | 329.825 |
| 2nd place, silver medalist(s) | Oklahoma | 53.699 | 54.132 | 54.200 | 56.666 | 55.366 | 54.432 | 328.495 |
| 2nd place, silver medalist(s) | Colby Aranda | | 14.133 | | | | | 328.495 |
| 2nd place, silver medalist(s) | Fuzzy Benas | 13.233 | | | 14.200 | 13.900 | 13.466 | 328.495 |
| 2nd place, silver medalist(s) | Sasha Bogonsiuk | 13.200 | | | 14.133 | 12.466 | | 328.495 |
| 2nd place, silver medalist(s) | Kelton Christiansen | | | | | | 14.400 | 328.495 |
| 2nd place, silver medalist(s) | Tyler Flores | | 13.433 | | 14.433 | | | 328.495 |
| 2nd place, silver medalist(s) | Brigham Frentheway | 13.466 | | 13.400 | 13.900 | | 13.100 | 328.495 |
| 2nd place, silver medalist(s) | Tas Hajdu | | | 13.900 | | 14.200 | | 328.495 |
| 2nd place, silver medalist(s) | Nico Hamilton | 13.800 | | | | | 13.466 | 328.495 |
| 2nd place, silver medalist(s) | Nathan Roman | | | | | 14.800 | | 328.495 |
| 2nd place, silver medalist(s) | Mac Seyler | | 12.700 | 13.200 | | | | 328.495 |
| 2nd place, silver medalist(s) | Frencisco Velez Belendez | | | 13.700 | | | | 328.495 |
| 2nd place, silver medalist(s) | Ignacio Yockers | | 13.866 | | | | | 328.495 |
| 3rd place, bronze medalist(s) | Michigan | 53.232 | 53.164 | 54.298 | 56.232 | 54.132 | 53.799 | 324.857 |
| 3rd place, bronze medalist(s) | Landon Blixt | 13.866 | | | 14.366 | | 13.000 | 324.857 |
| 3rd place, bronze medalist(s) | Solen Chiodi | 13.033 | | | 13.800 | 13.500 | | 324.857 |
| 3rd place, bronze medalist(s) | Kevin Chow | | 11.566 | | | | | 324.857 |
| 3rd place, bronze medalist(s) | Carson Eshleman | | | | | 13.266 | 14.200 | 324.857 |
| 3rd place, bronze medalist(s) | Zach Granados | | 13.266 | | | | | 324.857 |
| 3rd place, bronze medalist(s) | Joseph Hale | | | 13.533 | | | | 324.857 |
| 3rd place, bronze medalist(s) | Charlie Larson | 11.933 | | | 14.266 | | | 324.857 |
| 3rd place, bronze medalist(s) | Aaronson Mansberger | | 14.566 | | | | | 324.857 |
| 3rd place, bronze medalist(s) | Robert Noll | | | 12.766 | | | | 324.857 |
| 3rd place, bronze medalist(s) | Akshay Puri | | | 14.066 | | | | 324.857 |
| 3rd place, bronze medalist(s) | Fred Richard | 14.400 | 13.766 | 13.933 | 13.800 | 14.533 | 13.166 | 324.857 |
| 3rd place, bronze medalist(s) | Pierce Wolfgang | | | | | 12.833 | 13.433 | 324.857 |
| 4 | Nebraska | 55.732 | 52.999 | 54.599 | 55.100 | 53.799 | 52.433 | 324.662 |
| 4 | Caden Clinton | | 13.433 | | | 13.633 | | 324.662 |
| 4 | Asher Cohen | | | 14.500 | | 12.900 | | 324.662 |
| 4 | Luke James | 14.033 | | | 13.800 | | | 324.662 |
| 4 | Anthony Koppie | | | 13.600 | | | 13.300 | 324.662 |
| 4 | Chase Mondi | 14.066 | | | | | | 324.662 |
| 4 | Alex Nitache | | | | 14.000 | 13.033 | 12.833 | 324.662 |
| 4 | Max Odden | 13.833 | | 12.966 | | | 13.700 | 324.662 |
| 4 | Sam Rakita | | | 13.533 | | | 12.600 | 324.662 |
| 4 | Wyatt Reynolds | | 12.100 | | | | | 324.662 |
| 4 | Ty Roderiques | | | | 13.900 | | | 324.662 |
| 4 | Nik Tarca | | 13.566 | | | | | 324.662 |
| 4 | Nathan York | 13.800 | 13.900 | | 13.400 | 14.233 | | 324.662 |
| 5 | Illinois | 53.832 | 54.199 | 53.598 | 53.865 | 54.065 | 52.665 | 322.224 |
| 5 | Hasan Aydogdu | | | 13.666 | | | | 322.224 |
| 5 | Tate Costa | 14.166 | 13.633 | | 13.233 | 13.266 | 13.266 | 322.224 |
| 5 | Brandon Dang | | 14.700 | | | | | 322.224 |
| 5 | Sam Kaplan | | | | | 13.433 | | 322.224 |
| 5 | Connor Micklos | | 13.466 | | | | | 322.224 |
| 5 | Logan Myers | | | 13.133 | | | | 322.224 |
| 5 | Preston Ngai | 13.066 | 12.400 | 13.666 | 12.333 | | 12.166 | 322.224 |
| 5 | Sam Phillips | 13.200 | | | | 13.500 | 14.000 | 322.224 |
| 5 | Garret Schooley | 13.400 | | 13.133 | 14.233 | | | 322.224 |
| 5 | Dylan Shepard | | | | 14.066 | 13.866 | | 322.224 |
| 5 | Ryan Vanichtheeranont | | | | | | 13.233 | 322.224 |
| 6 | Ohio State | 53.566 | 51.765 | 51.932 | 53.932 | 52.833 | 52.065 | 316.093 |
| 6 | Drake Andrews | | | | | 13.500 | 11.966 | 316.093 |
| 6 | Peyton Contini | | | 13.033 | | | | 316.093 |
| 6 | Noah Copeland | 13.500 | | | | | 12.866 | 316.093 |
| 6 | Chase Davenport-Mills | 13.866 | | | 13.733 | | | 316.093 |
| 6 | Kristian Grahovski | | 13.100 | 12.666 | 12.400 | 13.400 | 13.800 | 316.093 |
| 6 | Jacob Harmon | 13.400 | | | | | 13.433 | 316.093 |
| 6 | Jace Hashimoto | | 12.966 | | | | | 316.093 |
| 6 | Jesse Pakele | 12.800 | | 13.100 | | 12.233 | | 316.093 |
| 6 | David Ramirez | | | 13.133 | 13.833 | 13.700 | | 316.093 |
| 6 | Conan Simpkins | | 12.833 | | | | | 316.093 |
| 6 | Zach Snyder | | | | 13.966 | | | 316.093 |
| 6 | Parker Thackston | | 12.866 | | | | | 316.093 |

== Individual Event Medalists ==
The top-three all-around competitors and top-three individuals on each event who are not members of one of the qualifying teams advanced from each pre-qualifying session to the finals session to compete for individual titles.

| Event | Gold | Silver | Bronze |
|---|---|---|---|
| Individual all-around | Fred Richard (Michigan) | Max Odden (Nebraska) | Kristian Grahovski (Ohio State) |
| Floor | Cooper Kim (Stanford) | Fred Richard (Michigan) | Tate Costa (Illinois) |
| Pommel horse | Brandon Dang (Illinois) | Aaronson Mansberger (Michigan) | Colby Aranda (Oklahoma) |
| Rings | Asher Cohen (Nebraska) | Asher Hong (Stanford) | Nick Kuebler (Stanford) |
| Vault | Jun Iwai (Stanford) Tyler Flores (Oklahoma) | Not awarded | Landen Blixt (Michigan) |
| Parallel bars | Nathan Roman (Oklahoma) | Fred Richard (Michigan) | Asher Hong (Stanford) |
| High bar | Kelton Christiansen (Oklahoma) | Carson Eshleman (Michigan) | Cooper Kim (Stanford) |
