= Mark Caso =

American artistic gymnast

- Born: 1960 or 1961 (age 64–65)
- Height: 5 ft 4.5 in (164 cm)

Gymnastics career
- Discipline: Men's artistic gymnastics
- Country represented: United States (1981–1984)
- College team: UCLA Bruins
- Head coach: Art Shurlock
- Former coach: Ron Caso
- Retired: c. 1985
Medal record
Men's artistic gymnastics
Representing United States
Event	1st	2nd	3rd
Pan American Games	0	1	2
Total	0	1	2
Pan American Games
Silver medal – second place	1983 Caracas	Team
Bronze medal – third place	1983 Caracas	Floor
Bronze medal – third place	1983 Caracas	Rings

Mark Caso (born 1960 or 1961) is a retired American artistic gymnast. He was a member of the United States men's national artistic gymnastics team and won three medals at the 1983 Pan American Games.

== Early life and education ==
Caso was born in 1960 or 1961 and raised in Syracuse, New York. As a youth, he participated in gymnastics with his brother, Chris, and both later competed for East Syracuse-Minoa Central High School. He was coached by his father, Ron Caso. At the inaugural Empire State Games in 1978, Caso won seven medals. He graduated in 1979 and enrolled at the University of California, Los Angeles to pursue gymnastics.

== Gymnastics career ==
While a student at UCLA, Caso was a UCLA Bruins men's gymnastics team member. He competed from 1980 to 1984 and was the captain of the 1984 NCAA men's gymnastics championships-winning Bruins team. His brother, Chris, would also later join him at UCLA and was a member of the championship-winning team.

During his freshman year on January 31, 1980, Caso suffered a cervical fracture at practice while attempting a one-and-a-half twisting, one-and-three-quarters Arabian on the floor. The fracture resulted in paralysis and doctors fused his fifth and sixth cervical vertebrae using bone from his hip. Caso's doctor said that he was "a millimeter away from being paralyzed completely." He endured a two-month hospitalization and nearly ten months of rehabilitation. As a result, he was unable to compete in the 1980 United States Olympic trials.

The following year, Caso became a member of the United States men's national artistic gymnastics team for the first time. At the 1981 U.S. National Sports Festival in front of a hometown Syracuse crowd, Caso won four medals, one shy of the NSF record, and was given two standing ovations.

Caso represented the United States at the 1983 Pan American Games. He won a silver medal in the team all-around and added two individual bronze medals on the floor and still rings. He was a finalist for the 1984 Nissen-Emery Award, awarded to the top senior men's collegiate gymnast. He later competed at the 1984 United States Olympic trials and placed 10th, missing the Olympic team by two spots. Following the event, he intended to retire from gymnastics, and it was later reported to be the case. Despite the reports, Caso competed at the 1985 Worlds team selection trials for the United States. He tied for 14th place and was not selected for the team.

== Later career, legacy, and personal life ==
After gymnastics, Caso pursued an acting career in 1985 and had appeared in 30 commercials by 1988. He was a student at the Joanne Baron acting school. With his background in gymnastics, Caso was cast and performed in the 1991 movie, Teenage Mutant Ninja Turtles II: The Secret of the Ooze as Leonardo. He reprised the role in Teenage Mutant Ninja Turtles III. He appeared as a series regular on Xuxa.

He later had a corporate career with Bruder.

Caso was inducted into the greater Syracuse hall of fame as part of the class of 2000. In 2009, he was inducted into the East Syracuse-Minoa Central School District hall of fame. He has been rated as the top athlete to ever come from the school across all sports.

Caso is married to Beate Caso and their daughter, Francesca, competed in collegiate gymnastics for the Oregon State Beavers women's gymnastics team.
