= Joey Ray =

American artistic gymnast

- Full name: Joseph Ray
- Born: 1962 or 1963 (age 63–64)

Gymnastics career
- Discipline: Men's artistic gymnastics
- Country represented: United States (1981–1986)
- College team: Minnesota Golden Gophers (1981–1984)
- Head coach: Fred Roethlisberger
- Retired: c. 1986
- Awards: Big Ten Medal of Honor (1984)
Medal record
Men's artistic gymnastics
Representing United States
| Event | 1st | 2nd | 3rd |
|---|---|---|---|
| Pan American Games | 0 | 1 | 0 |
| Total | 0 | 1 | 0 |
Pan American Games
| Silver medal – second place | 1983 Caracas | Team |

Joseph Ray (born 1962 or 1963) is a retired American artistic gymnast. He was a member of the United States men's national artistic gymnastics team and won a silver medal at the 1983 Pan American Games.

== Early life and education ==
Ray was born around 1962 or 1963 and was a native of Morton Grove, Illinois. He started gymnastics at 9 years old after seeing other children performing flips and taking an interest. Practicing 3 hours a day, he was a top youth gymnast at Maine East High School and the American Academy Gymnastics Club, and won the Class AA state title on parallel bars and horizontal bar. He was a member of the United States junior national team. He later enrolled at the University of Minnesota.

== Gymnastics career ==
While a student at the University of Minnesota, Ray was a member of the Minnesota Golden Gophers men's gymnastics team from 1981 to 1984. He was the Big Ten Conference all-around champion in 1983. He was a four-time conference champion on parallel bars (1981 through 1984) and won the pommel horse title in 1981. He was an All-American on the parallel bars in 1981. He was awarded the Big Ten Medal of Honor in 1984.

While in college, Ray was first named to the United States men's national artistic gymnastics team in 1981. He represented the United States at the 1983 Pan American Games and won a silver medal in the team all-around and placed fifth in the pommel horse.

He graduated from the University of Minnesota in 1984, but continued training and later joined the Golden Gophers as an assistant coach. He remained a member of the US National Team until 1986, but continued coaching and began judging gymnastics.

Ray was inducted into the Minnesota Golden Gophers "M Club Hall of Fame" as a member of the class of 2015.
