= Tatiana Figueiredo =

Brazilian gymnast (born 1968)

- Born: 29 June 1968 (age 58) Rio de Janeiro, Brazil

Gymnastics career
- Discipline: Women's artistic gymnastics
- Country represented: Brazil
Medal record
Representing Brazil
Women's artistic gymnastics
Pan American Games
| Bronze medal – third place | 1983 Caracas | Team |
South American Games
| Gold medal – first place | 1982 Rosario | Team |
| Bronze medal – third place | 1982 Rosario | Uneven bars |

Tatiana Figueiredo (born 29 June 1968) is a Brazilian gymnast. She competed in five events at the 1984 Summer Olympics.
