= Woodward Academy =

Private school in College Park, Georgia, United States

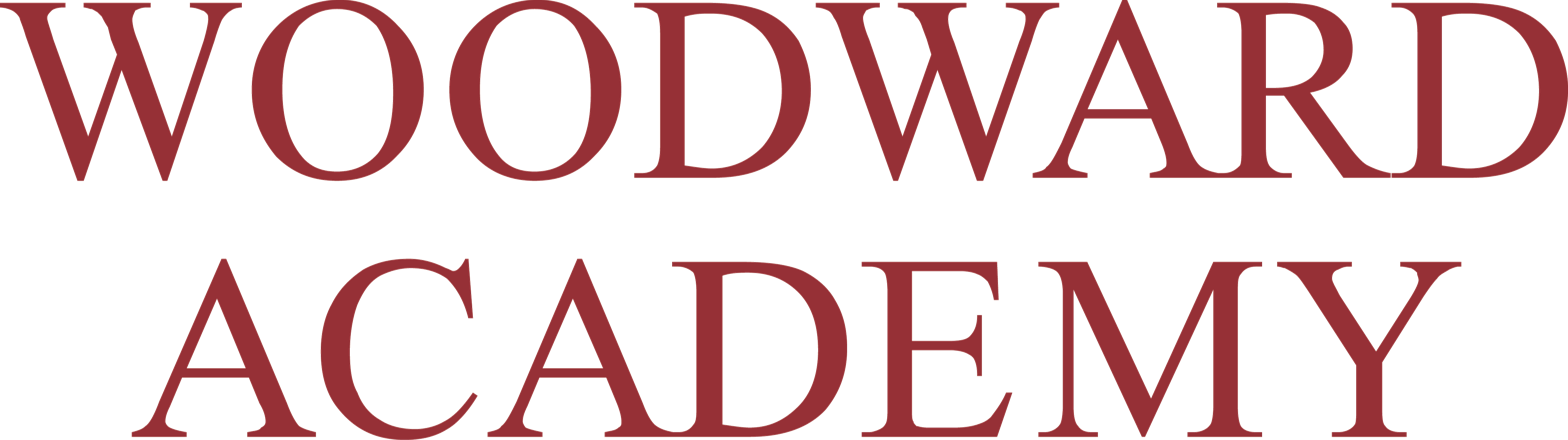

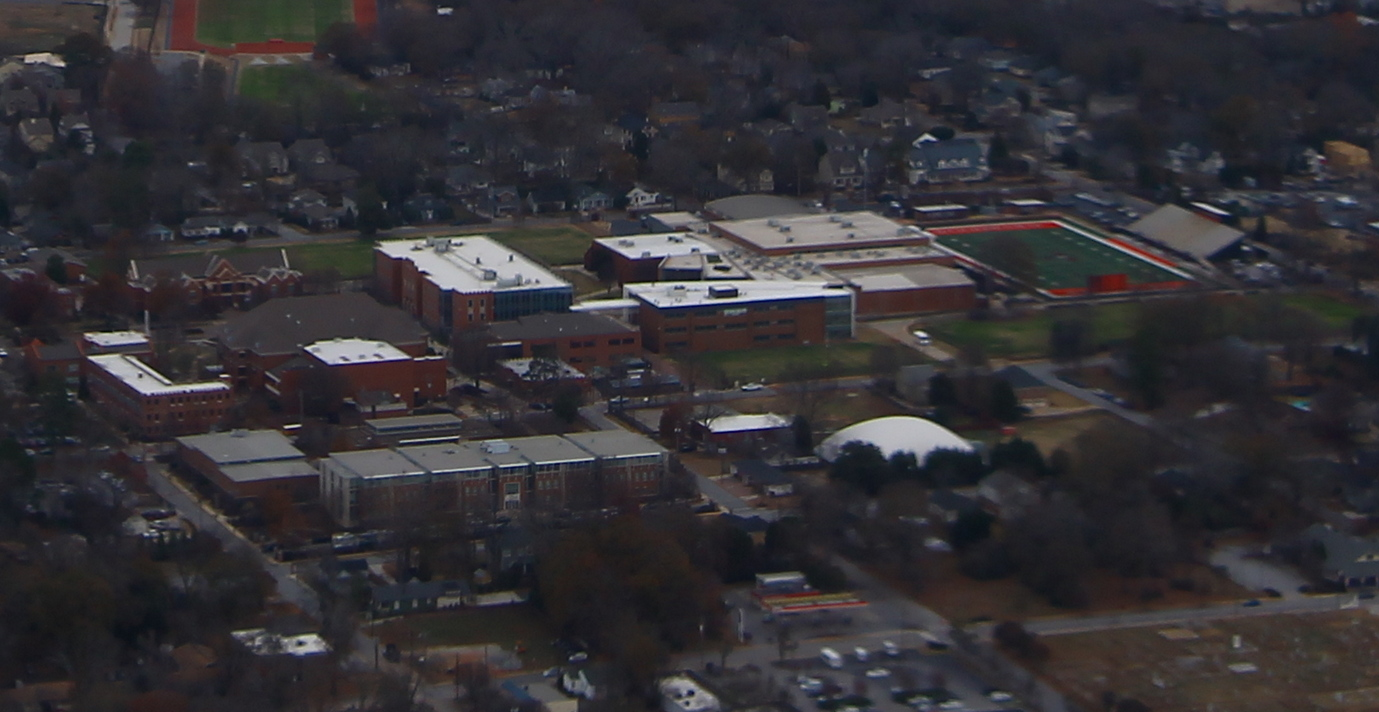

Location
- 1662 Rugby Ave; College Park, Georgia; United States; 33°39′46.4328″N 84°26′35.9174″W

Information
- Type: Private, college preparatory
- Motto: "Excellence, Character, Opportunity"
- Established: 1900
- President: Chris Freer
- Faculty: 315
- Gender: Coeducational
- Enrollment: 2,703
- Campus: Urban
- Colors: Red, white and black
- Mascot: Eddie the Eagle
- Website: woodward.edu

Woodward Academy (also known as Woodward or WA) is a private, co-educational college-preparatory school for pre-kindergarten to 12th grade on two campuses located in College Park and Johns Creek, Georgia, United States, within the Atlanta metropolitan area.

== History ==
Woodward Academy was founded in 1900 as Georgia Military Academy. Originally an all-male school, in 1964 it became coeducational and was renamed Woodward Academy in 1966. The boarding program was discontinued in 1993. Woodward draws its students from 23 metro Atlanta counties taken to school by MARTA, Woodward buses, parents, or carpool. The school has two campuses – the Main Campus in College Park (preK-12) and Woodward North in Johns Creek (preK-6).

== Academics ==
Woodward Academy is divided into five schools. Located on the Main Campus in historic College Park are the Upper, Middle, Lower, and Primary schools. The second campus, Woodward North, serves preK through sixth grade. The Primary School has students in preK through 3rd grade, the Lower School has 4th through 6th grade students, the Middle School has 7th and 8th grade students, and the Upper School has students in 9th grade through 12th grade.

== Athletics ==
Woodward Academy's athletics program sponsors 18 varsity sports across fall, winter and spring seasons. Woodward (formerly Georgia Military Academy) has won 84 State Championships administered by the Georgia High School Association.

== History and traditions of Georgia Military Academy (GMA) ==
The Woodward Story, A History of Georgia Military/Woodward Academy 1900-1990", by Robert Ballentine, published 1990 by Jostens Printing and Publishing; content used with permission of the copyright holder, Woodward Academy Inc., College Park, Georgia, USA.

Georgia Military Academy (GMA) was a private, college-preparatory military school located in College Park, Georgia that taught both boarding and non-boarding students from its founding in September 1900 to 1965. It was called GMA by its students, faculty and staff. In 1965 its Board of Directors changed the corporate name to Woodward Academy and discontinued Army ROTC as well as all the school’s previous military traditions and customs.

Georgia Military Academy was opened in September 1900 by Colonel John Charles Woodward and his wife, Lucile Woodward, in the single three-story building which became known as Founders Hall. The building had been the site of a previous, short-lived military academy known as Southern Military Academy. The campus consisted of sixteen acres of unimproved scrub land. The first class of thirty cadets lived and worked in Founders Hall in its eight resident rooms. Founders’ Hall included ten classrooms, laboratories, a library and an armory. By the 1901 term, enrollment had grown to fifty cadets, the grounds had been cleared, a garden, hog pens and a small dairy had been added. By 1907, GMA had grown to one hundred and twenty cadets and ten teachers. The first major construction at GMA was Rugby Hall which was completed in 1902 and which contained fourteen resident rooms for teachers and cadets. A gymnasium was added in 1907 which later became known as the “Old Gym.” In 1908, at the order of President Teddy Roosevelt, a Regular U.S. Army officer was posted to serve as a full-time military instructor. In that same year, a football field was constructed and dedicated.

=== The years 1911 to 1925 ===
During the years leading up to and immediately after World War I, GMA continued to expand and took on greater importance in Georgia and National history. In 1914, its founder Col. Woodward was instrumental in launching the Association of Military Colleges and Schools (now known as AMCSUS) of which GMA became a founding member school. In 1916, GMA was established as a Junior Reserve Officer’s Training Corp (“JROTC” or “Junior ROTC”) under the National Defense Act of 1916. Six hundred GMA alumni served in World War I and most served as commissioned officers. Thirteen GMA alumni were killed in WWI and are memorialized in Monument Row along the central avenue of Woodward Academy also honoring alumni killed in World War II, the Korean War, the Vietnam War and in military conflicts since 1973. The campus grew to over twenty-five acres and other iconic buildings were added, all in the same red brick with white column architectural style including Memorial Hall, the Founders Hall Annex and the New Gym which was believed to be the largest gym of any prep school in the country. The New Gym was renovated to administrative offices in 1943 and continued in use until 1975.

GMA was designated as an Honor Military Academy in 1925. In June 1925 GMA was notified that it had achieved the designation of Honor Military Academy in a letter from then Major General Douglas MacArthur who would later become famous as General of the Army in World War II. Every year from then forward the Corps of Cadets prepared for its annual Army inspection to decide whether the “Honor” designation could be maintained. GMA Cadets painted, cleaned, mopped, oiled, policed, polished, mended and drilled for weeks in preparation. In the military tradition of preparing for inspection, no outside help was ever received. This annual ritual exemplified the Academy’s emphasis on personal self-reliance and attention to detail. The Honor Military Academy designation gave GMA the right to appoint one cadet to each of the four Service Academies.

=== Challenging years – the Great Depression ===
The years beginning around 1926 were financially challenging for GMA. The day student population had declined to seven cadets by 1926. Colonel Woodward cultivated a relationship with Cuban friends and persuaded Major N.J. Castellanos and his wife Maria to join the faculty. Recruitment of Cuban students and other full-tuition-paying students from other countries helped keep GMA going. During these years, teacher salaries were low and some teachers were working for room and board. The iconic Memorial Gate was dedicated by the Class of 1929-1930 and the band got their first uniforms. Lucile Woodward, co-founder of GMA, died in 1931.

=== The Great Gesture – 1932 ===
In 1932, in what became known as the “Great Gesture,” Col. Woodward transferred all his ownership to and became a co-founder of the non-profit corporation known as Georgia Military Academy. The Academy, now a corporation with a governing board, remained in College Park, Georgia and was founded “not for pecuniary gain to stockholders, but for the purpose of conducting a charitable and educational institution.” Other founders included William Roe Brewster, who was to replace Col. Woodward in the 1930s, Robert W. Woodruff, R.S. Rosser, D.C. Woodward, George W. West, C.D. Woodward, Glenville Giddings, Mrs. Mildred C. Woodward, Mrs. Ruth Gladys McQuarrie, Mrs. Elsie Gore Woodward, Grace Charles Woodward, Majorie Lucille Woodward and others.

=== William R. Brewster becomes President of GMA ===
In 1939, Col. Woodward died and Col. William R. Brewster Sr., son-in-law of Col. Woodward, was elected by the Board of Directors to become the second president of GMA. Col. Brewster, a 1920 graduate of the U.S. Military Academy, had been a professor of mathematics and commandant of GMA. He guided GMA’s growth from 400 cadets to 1,000. He founded a Junior School (primary school grades) that grew from 50 cadets to 300. He founded the GMA Junior College in 1940 and initiated its termination in 1953 when draft deferment was ended for junior college students. He planned for and supervised the construction of the Junior School building, the Administration Building (West Hall), the Rugby Hall Annex and the Gymnasium.

=== William R. Brewster Jr. becomes President of GMA ===
In 1960, Commander William R. Brewster Jr., U.S.N.R, became the third president of GMA from 1959 to 1979. “Commander Brewster,” as he was known by cadets, graduated from the U.S. Naval Academy with the class of 1942 days after Pearl Harbor on December 19, 1941. In Operation Torch in North Africa his ship, the BERNADOU, was awarded a Presidential Unit Citation and Brewster as its Gunnery Officer the Silver Star Medal. In October 1944 off Okinawa, his ship USS Prichett (DD 561) was attacked and he was awarded the Bronze Star Medal with a Combat “V.” He was a Naval Aviator, remaining in the Naval Air Reserve. Commander Brewster taught mathematics and science and served as commandant at GMA. During the next thirty-three years he worked up the administrative ladder. His wife of 57 years, Kathryn (“Kitty”) Cummings Brewster, was a beloved figure to GMA Cadets for her warmth and charm. She was active in the school’s administration, including interior design for new buildings, approval of weekly menus, landscape design and supervision, purchasing and distributing textbooks and supervision of school opening and social functions. During his tenure as President, he initiated the school’s first fundraising effort in its 65-year history which raised enough capital to renovate many old facilities and build necessary new ones. Between 1965 and 1966, he carried out the transition of GMA from a military academy to a non-military college preparatory school, Woodward Academy, and brought many other changes including phasing out the Army ROTC program.

=== War service of GMA alumni ===
During the Second World War and the Korean War, GMA offered continuous school which allowed graduation in two and one-half years. An estimated 1,500 alumni served in the armed forces during those wars with over fifty percent serving as commissioned officers. About 600 GMA alumni served in World War I and many GMA alumni also served in the Vietnam War. The entry to the Woodward Academy campus along East Rugby Street is lined with memorials to GMA alumni who died in each war of the 20th and 21st Centuries.

== Notable alumni ==
=== Government ===
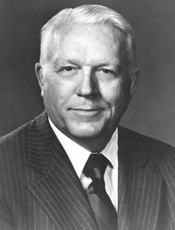
U.S. Representative John Flynt, 1954–1979

- Irlo "Bud" Bronson, Jr. – former Florida State Representative, 1983–1993
- Amy Carter (1985) – daughter of former U.S. President Jimmy Carter
- John James Flynt, Jr. – former U.S. Representative, Georgia's 4th Congressional District, 1954–1979
- Spencer Frye (1986) – Georgia State Representative, 2013–present
- Phil Gramm (1961) – former U.S. Senator, Texas, 1985–2002; U.S. Representative, Texas's 6th Congressional District, 1979–1985
- Marty Harbin – Georgia State Senator, 2015–present
- Brian Jack (2006) – White House Political Director, 2018–2021
- Walter E. Johnston, III (1953) – former U.S. Representative, North Carolina's 6th Congressional District, 1981–1983
- Burt Jones (1998) – Georgia State Senator, 2013–present
- David Knight – Georgia State Representative, 2005–present
- Thomas J. Pearsall (1923) – former Speaker of the North Carolina House of Representatives, 1947–1949; author of the Pearsall Plan, a school integration initiative
- Williamson S. Stuckey, Jr. (1952) – former U.S. Representative, Georgia's 8th Congressional District, 1967–1977; Chairman of Stuckey’s Corporation, 1985–2019
- Randolph W. Thrower (1930) – former U.S. Commissioner of Internal Revenue, 1969–1971
- Andy Welch (1990) – Georgia State Representative, 2011–present
- Damian Williams (1998)- United States Attorney for the Southern District of New York
- Bruce Williamson (1972) – Georgia State Representative, 2011–present
- Fred Wood – Idaho State Representative, 2006–present

=== Athletics ===
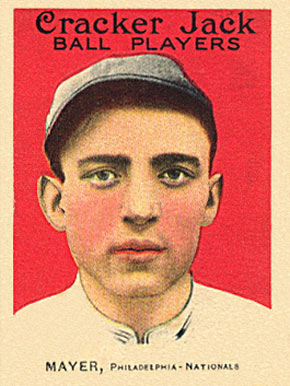
MLB player Erskine Mayer, 1912–1919

- Andrew Adams (2011) – NFL player, 2016–present
- Damari Alston (2022) - college football running back for the Auburn Tigers and the Tulsa Golden Hurricane
- Henry Anderson (2010) – NFL player, 2015–present; 93rd pick of the 2015 NFL draft
- Jerome Bettis Jr. (2025) – college football wide receiver for the Notre Dame Fighting Irish
- Kiesha Brown (1996) – former WNBA player, 2002–2010
- A. J. Cole III (2014) – NFL player, 2019–present
- Delino DeShields, Jr. (2010) – MLB player, 2015–present; 8th overall pick of the 2010 MLB draft
- Elijah Holyfield (2016) – NFL player, 2019–present; son of Evander Holyfield
- Julian Jenkins (2002) – former NFL player, 2006; 156th pick of the 2006 NFL draft
- Walker Kessler (2020) – NBA player, 2022–present
- Dan Lyle (1988) - United States national rugby union team player, 1994–2003
- Tommy Lyons (1966) – former NFL player, 1971–1976; 350th pick of the 1971 NFL draft
- Spider Maxwell (1983), former collegiate gymnast; 1987 Nissen Award Winner
- Erskine Mayer (1907) – former MLB player, 1912–1919
- Will Richard (2021) - basketball player
- Tim Simpson (1974) – former PGA Tour golfer, 1977–1998; former PGA Tour Champions golfer, 2006–2011
- Reed Sorenson (2004) – Monster Energy NASCAR Cup Series driver, 2005–present
- Juwan Thompson (2010) – former NFL player, 2014–2016

=== Military ===
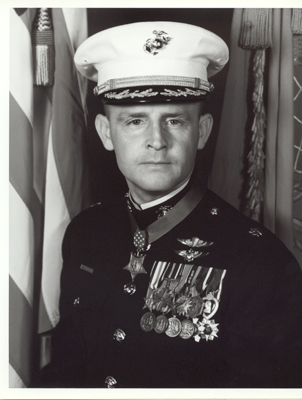
Medal of Honor recipient Stephen W. Pless

- John W. Bowen (1928), U.S. Army lieutenant general
- Julien J. LeBourgeois – former Vice Admiral, United States Navy; President of the U.S. Naval War College, 1974–1977
- Stephen W. Pless (1957) – former Major, United States Marine Corps; Medal of Honor recipient

=== Business ===
- Michael C. Carlos (1944) – former chairman and CEO of the National Distributing Company; philanthropist
- Edwin W. Pauley (1919) – oil company executive; philanthropist
- Robert W. Woodruff (1908) – former President of The Coca–Cola Company, 1923–1955; philanthropist

=== Academia ===
- James D. Bales- bible professor at Harding University
- Phillip Griffiths – mathematician
- James F. Jones, Jr. (1965) – President of the Sweet Briar College, 2014–present; former President of Trinity College, 2004–2014; former President of Kalamazoo College, 1996–2004
- Sheryl McCollum – professor, crime analyst, non–profit founder/director
- William Tate – former Dean of Men at University of Georgia, 1946–1971

=== Entertainment ===
- Scott Budnick (1995) – film producer, most notably of The Hangover
- Roshani Chokshi (2009) – author
- Sterling Holloway (1920) – film and voice actor
- Jeffrey Stepakoff (1981) – film and TV writer, most notably of Dawson's Creek; author
- Kris Kross - 90's rap duo
- Alonso Duralde (1984) - film critic (TheWrap) and author
- Hunter Bell (1989) - Broadway actor/writer, Tony nominee
- Kenan Thompson - actor
