= Memorial Hall (University of Georgia) =

Coordinates: 33.9513°N 83.3736°W

War Memorial Hall (more generally known as Memorial Hall) is a landmark building on the campus of the University of Georgia (UGA) in Athens, Georgia, United States.

The impetus for the building began in 1903 as a joint project between the local YMCA and the University to construct a recreational facility; however, the YMCA eventually decided to build their own building elsewhere in Athens. The University began construction in 1910 on Lucas Hill and spent $59,000 before halting construction when no additional funds were available. In the interim, the partially-completed building served as home to the Bulldogs men's basketball team from 1911 to 1919.

Athens businessman and alumnus Harry Hodgson (class of 1893) renewed construction on the building at the conclusion of World War I by leading an Alumni Committee fundraising campaign to complete the building in honor of those UGA students that served and died in the war. The War Memorial Fund, UGA's first capital campaign, drew contributions from the Rockefeller Foundation and renowned UGA benefactor George Foster Peabody amongst others to collect almost $800,000.

Upon completion in 1925, bronze plaques were installed in the rotunda of the hall that contained the names of every UGA alumnus that died in the war. UGA Chancellor David Barrow wrote the following inscription that was placed on the rotunda's rim:

In loyal love we set apart this house, a memorial to those lovers of peace who took arms, left home and dear ones and gave life that all men might be free.

War Memorial Hall served as the student recreation center until the Dean William Tate student center was opened in 1984. Memorial Hall was then used to house the student-run radio station WUOG and several other campus organizations in addition to serving as the class registration facility. Memorial Hall is also the home of the University's Department of Intercultural Affairs, which contains such branches as the African American Cultural Center, International Student Life, Multicultural Services and Programs, as well as the LGBT Resource Center.
