= Cláudia Costa =

Brazilian gymnast (born 1962)

- Full name: Cláudia de Paula Costa Magalhães
- Born: 27 January 1962 (age 64) Rio de Janeiro, Brazil

Gymnastics career
- Discipline: Women's artistic gymnastics
- Country represented: Brazil
Medal record
Representing Brazil
Women's artistic gymnastics
Pan American Games
| Bronze medal – third place | 1983 Caracas | Team |
South American Games
| Gold medal – first place | 1982 Rosario | Team |
South American Championships
| Gold medal – first place | 1980 Santiago | Team |

Cláudia de Paula Costa Magalhães (born 27 January 1962) is a Brazilian gymnast. She competed in five events at the 1980 Summer Olympics.

== Career ==
Cláudia de Paula Costa Magalhães began practicing artistic gymnastics at an early age in Rio de Janeiro, She won multiple national junior championships before joining the Brazilian national team, Magalhães represented Brazil at the 1980 Summer Olympics in Moscow, competing in five events in the women’s artistic gymnastics category, including both individual and team competitions. She also participated in several World Artistic Gymnastics Championships.
