= Spider Maxwell =

American gymnast

Personal information
- Born: Michael Maxwell

Sport
- Sport: Gymnastics
- University team: Penn State University

Michael "Spider" Maxwell is an American retired gymnast. He competed for Penn State University and won the 1987 Nissen Award (the "Heisman" of men's gymnastics).

Maxwell graduated from Woodward Academy in 1983 and earned a full gymnastics scholarship to Pennsylvania State University. In 1987, Maxwell won the bronze medal at the USA Gymnastics National Championships.
