= Marilynn Minaker =

Canadian gymnast

Personal information
- Born: 12 November 1949 (age 76) Kirkland Lake, Ontario, Canada

Sport
- Sport: Gymnastics
Medal record
Women's Gymnastics
Representing Canada
Pan American Games
Silver medal – second place	1967 Winnipeg	Team event

Marilynn Minaker (born 12 November 1949) is a Canadian gymnast. She represented Canada in the World Championships in Dortmund, Germany in 1966, the Pan American Games in Winnipeg, Canada in 1967 and in the Olympics Games in Mexico City, Mexico in 1968. She won a team silver medal at the 1967 Pan American Games and competed in six events at the 1968 Summer Olympics. She won numerous medals and awards throughout her career and was best known for her fearless balance beam work. Marilynn worked for the Fitness and Amateur Sport Directorate following the Olympics and toured Canada coast to coast as part of the Cross Canada Sports Demonstration Team. The Team introduced the Canada Fitness Awards Program across the nation. The athletes were examples and the appointed Canadian ambassadors for fitness. Bobby Orr made a guest appearance to join the team in their mission to encourage young Canadians to get active and get fit- to embrace fitness and sport. The Team was composed of four Olympians, three from track and field and one from gymnastics. Two Provincial athletes also joined the team. There was a featured film presented of the athletes in action and also a live demonstration given. During the year tour, the athletes also performed teaching clinics in the high schools and for the Physical Education students in the universities across Canada. They visited 88 cities and performed two shows a day.

== Early life ==
Minaker would do splits and cartwheels from an early age and considered herself to be "really flexible" and a tomboy. In 1963 when in eighth grade at Cedarbroole Public School, she was one of two students who won the provincial semi-final oratorical contest, having competed against "eight other outstanding speakers".

== Career ==
By 1963, she was the junior gymnastics champion of Ontario and the top junior trampoline performer in Canada. At the age of 13, she was just a little too young to partake in the 1964 Summer Olympics. In 1966, she won a gold medal during the world game trials and the following year, won a team silver medal at the 1967 Pan American Games in Winnipeg.

While training for the world championships, a fall resulted in a blood clot forming on her brain and during tests in hospital, recalled a doctor noting that she would "never do gymnastics again". She was scheduled for brain surgery that month at Mount Sinai in Toronto. Her father, a church minister, brought other believers together and they anointed Minaker with oil as is Biblical and prayed for her complete healing. The following morning, she was in high spirits and energetic and her balance completely restored. She was taken to the doctor’s office after prayer where she held a handstand and amazed the doctor. Her parents signed a release form as the surgery was being refused. Minaker firmly attests to God helping to prosper her career. She competed in six events at the 1968 Summer Olympics.

== Personal life ==
Minaker was born as the daughter of a minister and at a young age found her own relationship with God. She spoke internationally as a Christian athlete at the age of 15. Marilynn was also a member of YouthTime Radio that broadcast as far as South America. She answered questions received from young people in Dear Abby fashion. She won the Miss Scarborough Beauty contest in 1972. Her older brother won a silver medal for Canada in international wrestling.
