= Sheryl McCollum =

American crime professor

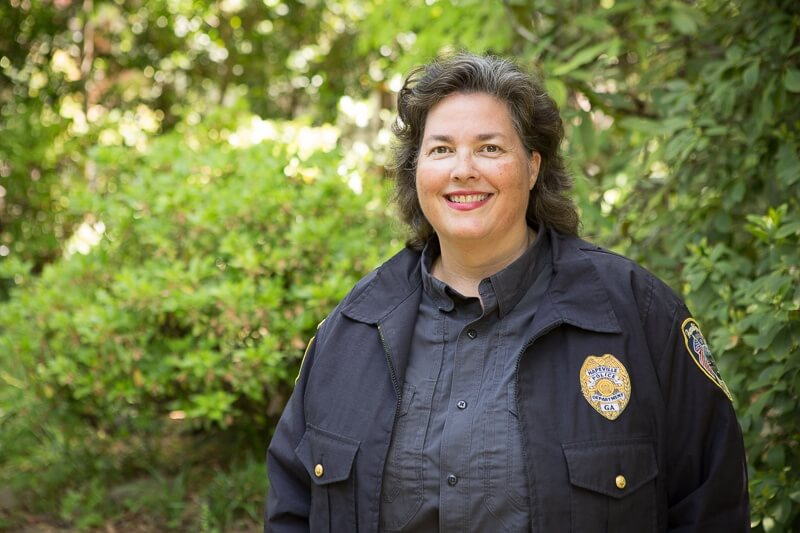
- McCollum in StyleBlueprint, 2018.
- Born: March 25; Atlanta, Georgia
- Education: Georgia State University; Kaplan University
- Occupations: Crime analyst Non-profit founder/director Professor; Author
- Known for: Cold case investigations and educator
- Website: https://www.coldcasefoundation.org/cold-case-application.html

Sheryl "Mac" McCollum (née Powell) is an American crime analyst, college professor, author, and founder and director of the non-profit Cold Case Investigative Research Institute based in Atlanta, Georgia, and a crime scene analyst for an Atlanta television station.

== Education ==
McCollum graduated high school from Woodward Academy, a preparatory school in Atlanta. She received a bachelor's degree in criminal justice from Georgia State University and a master's in criminal justice from Kaplan University.

== Career ==
McCollum's law-enforcement career began in 1982 at the Rape Crisis Center at Grady Memorial Hospital in Atlanta, Georgia. From there, she was director of the Metro Atlanta Cold Case Crime Analysis Squad. During the 1996 Olympic Games, she was the coordinator for the Crisis Response Team that planned and trained for four years and responded to the Centennial Olympic Park bombing, providing victim services.

She also served as the Georgia state director of Mothers Against Drunk Drivers.

McCollum in 2004 founded Cold Case Investigative Research Institute (CCIRI), a collaboration between Auburn University Montgomery, Faulkner University and Bauder College. CCIRI unites researchers, practitioners, students and the criminal justice community to work collectively to advance research, training and techniques in solving cold cases. CCIRI has since worked with 27 colleges and universities, more than 8,000 students and 600 experts, who have volunteered their time and talents to solve cold cases. a nationwide volunteer network made up of 27 colleges and universities, 600 forensic professionals and 5,000 students that assist victims' families and law enforcement by working on unsolved homicides, missing persons and kidnapping cases.

Beginning in 2008, CNN followed four Bauder College students as they built case files in the Chandra Levy and Natalee Holloway cold-case investigations, led by McCollum and her Cold Case Investigative Research Institute. In 2009, McCollum's students, after pursuing the Levy investigation for more than a year, narrowed the suspect list to one.

McCollum held workshops at CrimeCon 2017, a conference advertised as a "true-crime theme park" for amateur sleuths. McCollum's workshops included Wine & Crime sessions, which she described for CrimeCon's blog: "I’m giving you exactly what we know about a case that we’re working on. I’m holding nothing back. You’ll get the autopsy reports, the crime scene photographs, witness statements--anything that we have, you will have. Then you go to work."

McCollum in August 2019 joined Atlanta TV station WGCL-TV as a crime scene investigator on CSI Atlanta, working exclusively with a team from the station to investigate unsolved Georgia cases, including the 1946 Moore’s Ford Bridge Lynching case.

She is a contributing writer for CRIME online, a crime-fighting website founded by Nancy Grace, television personality and former prosecutor.

On December 15, 2022, McCollum launched her podcast, "Zone 7 with Sheryl McCollum," which explores cold-case crimes.

=== Awards ===
- McCollum was inducted in March 2023 into the National Law Enforcement Officer Hall of Fame, receiving the Scherer-Remsberg Lifetime Achievement Award.
- CSI Atlanta, which McCollum appears in, won a 2020 EMMY Award, Southeast.

=== Books ===
McCollum, on May 12, 2026, released the book Swans Don't Swim in a Sewer, published by Post Hill Press, an independent publishing house in Nashville, Tennessee.

She co-authored, with cold-case expert Betsy Ramsey, the book Cold Case: Pathways to Justice, released in 2010 by Pearson Learning Solutions.

== Personal life ==
McCollum lives in the Atlanta area with her husband and two children.
