= Jarrod Hanks =

American artistic gymnast

- Full name: Jarrod Jude Hanks
- Nickname: J
- Born: July 28, 1969 (age 57)

Gymnastics career
- Country represented: U.S.A.

Jarrod Hanks (born July 28, 1969) is a retired American gymnast. He first began gymnastics in 1977. Hanks was a member of the 1991 and 1992 World Championship squads. He did not make it to the 1992 Olympics, placing 9th all-around at the Trials.

Hanks competed for the University of Oklahoma and was the 1992 Nissen Award winner (the "Heisman" of gymnastics).

== Personal life ==
Hanks is married to singer and entertainer Heather Whittall, from Winter Park, Florida. After retiring, Hanks became a stuntman at Disney World. 2002, Hanks had his first daughter. 2004, Hanks had his second daughter. 2011, Hanks had his third daughter.

== Competition ==
=== International Competition ===
- 1996 Budget Rent a Car Gymnastics Invitational USA vs. France, Miami, Fla.; 1st-Team
- 1993 Puerto Rico Cup, Puerto Rico; 1st-AA & FX & PH & SR
- 1992 World Gymnastics Championships, Paris, France; advanced to semi-finals-9th-FX, 13th-PH
- 1992 Dodge Challenge: USA vs. Japan, Phoenix, Ariz.; 1st-Team, 2nd-AA
- 1992 McDonald's International Mixed Pairs, Tallahassee, Fla.; 4th-AA (with Kim Zmeskal)
- 1992 McDonald's American Cup, Orlando, Fla.; 1st-AA
- 1991 Tokyo Cup, Tokyo, Japan; 1st(t)-HB, 3rd-FX & PH
- 1991 Chunichi Cup, Nagoya City, Japan; 5th(t)-AA, 4th-FX, 5th-V, 6th-PH & HB, 7th-SR, 8th PB
- 1991 World Gymnastics Championships, Indianapolis, Ind.; 5th-Team, 16th-AA
- 1991 Pre-Olympic Meet, Barcelona, Spain; 2nd-Team, 15th-AA, 8th-PH
- 1990 The Pyramid Challenge: USA vs. GDR, Memphis, Tenn.; 9th-AA, 2nd(t)-HB
- 1987 USA vs. Australia, Colorado Springs, Colo.

=== National Competition ===
- 1996 Winter Cup Challenge, Colorado Springs, Colo.; 13th-AA
- 1995 World Team Trials, Austin, Texas; 14th-AA
- 1995 Coca-Cola National Championships, New Orleans, La.; 7th-AA, 3rd-SR, 4th-FX & PB
- 1994 Coca-Cola National Championships, Nashville, Tenn.; 11th-AA, 5th-FX, 2nd-PH
- 1994 Winter Cup Challenge, Colorado Springs, Colo.; 15th-AA (Compulsories) (injured—did not finish competition)
- 1993 Coca-Cola National Championships, Salt Lake City, Utah; 5th-AA, 3rd-FX, 5th-PH, 4th-PB
- 1993 World University Games Trials, Colorado Springs, Colo.; 6th-AA
- 1992 U.S. Olympic Trials, Baltimore, Md.; 9th-AA
- 1992 U.S. Gymnastics Championships, Columbus, Ohio; 9th-AA, 3rd-PH
- 1992 Winter Nationals, Colorado Springs, Colo.; 1st-AA
- 1991 U.S. Gymnastics Championships, Cincinnati, Ohio; 7th-AA, 2nd(t)-PH, 3rd-PB, 5th-HB
- 1991 NCAA Championships, University Park, Pa.; 1st-Team, 4th-AA, 4th-FX, 6th-SR, 7th-PB, 3rd-HB
- 1990 Winter Nationals, Colorado Springs, Colo.; Injured - did not compete
- 1990 U.S. Olympic Festival, Minneapolis, Minn.; 6th-AA
- 1990 U.S. Gymnastics Championships, Denver, Colo.; 15th-AA, 5th-PH
- 1990 NCAA Championships, Minneapolis, Minn.; 12th-AA, 5th(t)-FX, 7th(t)-SR
- 1989 Winter Nationals, Colorado Springs, Colo.; 12th-AA
- 1989 U.S. Olympic Festival, Oklahoma City, Okla.; 9th-AA, 6th-V
- 1989 U.S. Gymnastics Championships, Minneapolis, Minn.; 10th-AA
- 1988 Winter Nationals, Colorado Springs, Colo.; 18th-AA
- 1987 U.S. Olympic Sports Festival, Chapel Hill, N.C.; 16th-AA, 6th-HB
- 1987 McDonald's U.S. Gymnastics Championships, Kansas City, Mo.; 60th-AA
