= Chris Cameron (gymnast) =

American gymnast

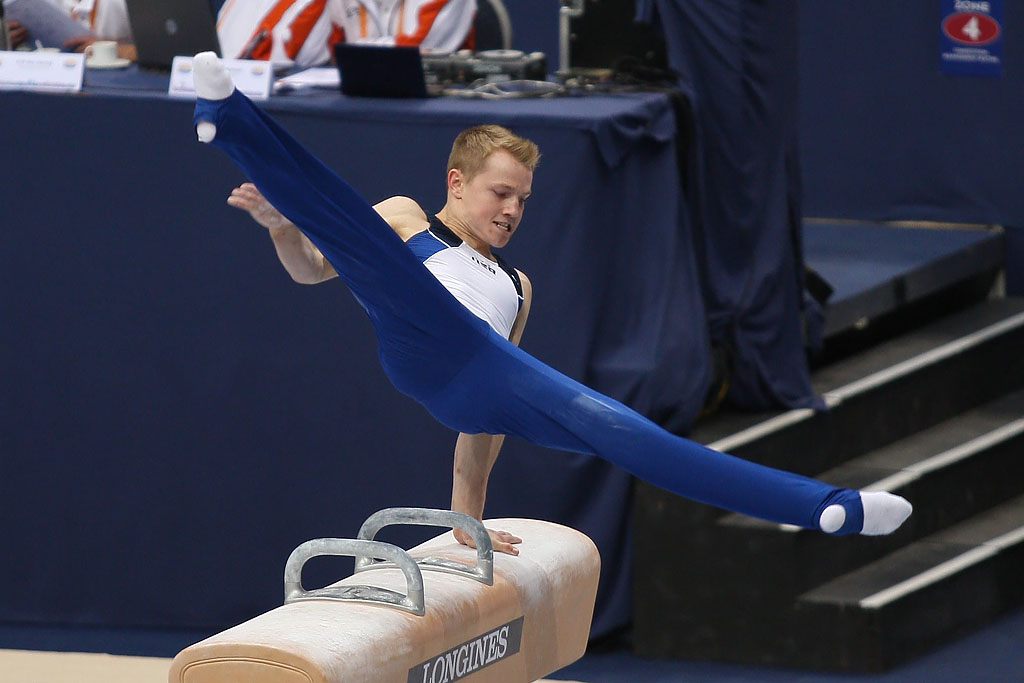
- Cameron on pommel horse in 2010.

Personal information
- Full name: Christopher Cameron
- Born: January 16, 1989 (age 37)

Gymnastics career
- Discipline: Men's artistic gymnastics
- Country represented: United States
- College team: Michigan Wolverines

Chris Cameron (born January 16, 1989) is an American artistic gymnast. Competing for the University of Michigan, he won the individual all-around title at the 2010 NCAA Men's Gymnastics championship in West Point, New York.

== Biography ==
=== Early years ===
Cameron's hometown is Winter Haven, Florida, where he attended Lake Region High School. He enrolled at the University of Michigan in 2007. As a freshman in the spring of 2008, Cameron was named an Academic All-American by the College Gymnastics Association. At the 2008 Big Ten Conference championship, he tied for third on pommel horse with a score of 14.850.

=== 2009 NCAA season ===
As a sophomore in 2009, Cameron won his first individual all-around title at the Windy City Invitational on January 17, 2009. He followed with an all-around title at the Pacific Coast Classic on February 21, 2009, with a score of 89.750. At the Big Ten Conference team championship on April 3, 2009, he finished second to teammate Thomas Kelley in the all-around competition. At the NCAA finals on April 17, 2009, he helped Michigan to a second-place finish in the team competition with career bests on floor exercise (15.650) and pommel horse (15.300) -- earning NCAA All-American status in both events. Cameron was also named to U.S. senior men's national team following the Winter Cup Invitational at the Las Vegas Sports Center on February 9, 2009. He was the first Michigan Wolverine gymnast to make the national team since Scott Vetere in 1999–2000. After the selection, Cameron told a reporter, "It was the most exhilarating and unbelievable thing I've felt in my entire life. I could not believe what had happened."

=== 2010 NCAA season ===
As a junior in 2010, Cameron was again named to the senior national team after placing third in the all-around at the Winter Cup Invitational in Las Vegas on February 6, 2010. At the Big Ten championship in early April 2010, Cameron won the all-around competition and floor exercise. He was also named the Big Ten Gymnast of the Year. After Cameron won the Big Ten title, Michigan coach Kurt Golder told a reporter, "I think he just has an inner drive to succeed and become the best gymnast he can become. It's really hard to find, and we're fortunate at Michigan to have a guy that's driven that hard." Teammate Thomas Kelley added, "He's more dedicated than any other gymnast I've ever met. He's got that little extra drive and little extra confidence that I think a lot of us aspire to have in our gymnastics. Just to go out, and know that you're going to hit no matter what. Chris doesn't waver. He's always rock solid."

=== 2010 NCAA individual and team championships ===
On April 16, 2010, Cameron won the individual all-around title and led Michigan to the team championship at the NCAA Men's Gymnastics championship at Christl Arena in West Point, New York. Cameron won the all-around title with 90.500 points, including 15.600 on the floor, 15.450 on rings and vault, 15.150 on parallel bars, 15.050 on pommel horse and a 13.800 on the horizontal bar. His score was 1.55 points ahead of second-place finisher Steven Legendre. Cameron's Michigan teammate Mel Anton Santander finished third in the all-around. After winning the all-around title, Cameron told International Gymnast Magazine, "It's been a lot of hard work, and all I can say is I couldn't dream of a better way to do it. I wouldn't want to do all-around if it was going to hurt the team. But it just so happens I can help the team by doing all-around tonight. I did it, I won, we won. There's nothing better than this." In an interview with The Michigan Daily, he added, "I usually grasp everything I've done right away. Not this. This hasn't hit me yet."

After winning the NCAA all-around title, Cameron was scheduled to compete with the US national team at the Pan Pacific championships in Melbourne, Australia, starting on April 23, 2010.
