= Gilbert Larose =

Personal information
- Full name: Gilbert Larose
- Alternative name: Gil LaRose
- Born: 13 September 1942 Montreal, Quebec, Canada
- Died: 25 August 2006 (aged 63) Montreal, Quebec
- Height: 5 ft 6 in (1.68 m)

Gymnastics career
- Discipline: Men's artistic gymnastics
- Country represented: Canada
- College team: Michigan Wolverines (1961–1963)

Gilbert Larose (also known as Gil LaRose) was a gymnast who was named NCAA all-around champion for the University of Michigan in 1963 and competed for Canada in the 1964 and 1968 Summer Olympics. Larose was the first University of Michigan gymnast to win the NCAA all-around title.

== Early life and education ==
Larose was born in Montreal on 13 September 1942. He attended Immaculate Conception High School, where he played right wing on the school's hockey team. He enjoyed the trampoline and experimented with other gymnastics equipment, quickly becoming a skilled gymnast and winning the Novice Division of the Canadian National Gymnastics Championship in 1957. He competed as a gymnast while attending the University of Michigan.

== Gymnastics career ==
=== University of Michigan ===
In 1963, Larose was named the All-Around NCAA Champion in gymnastics and won individual titles in Vault (Long Horse) and Horizontal Bar. Winning three NCAA titles in a single year is a university record that has not been repeated or exceeded (as of 2012). The University of Michigan men's gymnastics team (coached by Newt Loken) also won the NCAA Gymnastics Team Championship in 1963.

=== Olympics ===
==== 1964 ====
At the 1964 Summer Olympics in Tokyo, Larose competed in the following gymnastics events:

- Men's Floor Exercise
- Men's Horse Vault
- Men's Parallel Bars
- Men's Horizontal Bar
- Men's Rings
- Men's Pommelled Horse

achieving a rank of 92 in Men's Individual All-Around.

==== 1968 ====
At the 1968 Summer Olympics in Mexico City, Larose competed in the following gymnastics events:

- Men's Floor Exercise
- Men's Horse Vault
- Men's Parallel Bars
- Men's Horizontal Bar
- Men's Rings
- Men's Pommelled Horse

achieving a rank of 64 in Men's Individual All-Around and 16 in Men's Team All-Around.

== Later life ==
Larose returned to Montreal and became a high school teacher. He also served as coach of the Ontario-Québec Athletic Association (OQAA) University Conference gymnastics team and eventually died in Montreal on 25 August 2006.

(Note: In 1955 the OQAA was formed from a section of what had been known as the Canadian Intercollegiate Athletic Union. Following several reorganizations, the remaining members changed their name to Ontario Universities Athletic Association in 1971.)
