= Gymnastics at the 1983 Pan American Games =

- Gymnastics pictogram
- Venue: Gimnasio Cubierto de la UCV
- Start date: August 16, 1983
- End date: August 21, 1983
- No. of events: 14 (8 men, 6 women)
- Competitors: 96 from 13 nations

This page shows the results of the Gymnastics Competition at the 1983 Pan American Games in Caracas, Venezuela. The men's and women's artistic competition was held at the Gimnasio Cubierto de la UCV from August 16 through 21st.

== Medal summary ==
=== Medal table ===
Place	Nation	Gold medal	Silver medal	Bronze medal	Total
1	Cuba	11	8	4	23
2	United States	3	6	7	16
3	Venezuela	0	1	0	1
4	Brazil	0	0	1	1
4	Canada	0	0	1	1
Total		14	15	13	42

=== Men's events ===
Games	Gold	Silver	Bronze
Team all-around	Cuba; Lázaro Amador; Mario Castro; Roberto Richard; Jesús Rivera; Israel Sánchez; Casimiro Suárez	United States; Brian Babcock; Thomas Beach; Mark Caso; Mario Cutcheon; Billy Paul; Joey Ray	Canada; Dave Arnold; Ives Dion; Marshall Grafield; Curtis Hibert; Guy Lemellin; James Rozon
Individual all-around	Casimiro Suárez; Cuba	Brian Babcock; United States	Israel Sánchez; Cuba
Floor exercise	Casimiro Suárez; Cuba	Jesús Rivera; Cuba	Mark Caso; United States
Pommel horse	Lázaro Amador; Cuba	Brian Babcock; United States	Israel Sánchez; Cuba
Rings	Casimiro Suárez; Cuba	Israel Sánchez; Cuba	Mark Caso; United States
Vault	Casimiro Suárez; Cuba	Jorge Marin; Venezuela	Israel Sánchez; Cuba
Parallel bars	Roberto Richard; Cuba	Thomas Beach; United States	Casimiro Suárez; Cuba
Horizontal bar	Casimiro Suárez; Cuba	Jesús Rivera; Cuba	Billy Paul; United States

=== Women's events ===
Event	Gold	Silver	Bronze
Team all-around	United States; Tracy Butler; Yumi Mordre; Cindy Rosenberry; Trina Tinti; Lucy Wener; Lisa Wittwer	Cuba; Elsa Chivas; Isabel Cruzata; Tania González; Orisel Martínez; Luisa Prieto; Anet Rubido	Brazil; Denilce Campos; Miriam Fernández; Tatiana Figueiredo; Claudia Magalhaes; Jaqueline Pires; Altair Prado
Individual all-around	Orisel Martínez; Cuba	Yumi Mordre; United States	Lisa Wittwer; United States
Vault	Orisel Martínez; Cuba	Luisa Prieto; Cuba	Lisa Wittwer; United States
Uneven bars	Lucy Wener; United States	Lisa Wittwer; United States	Tania González; Cuba
Balance beam	Elsa Chivas; Cuba	Orisel Martínez; Cuba	Tracy Butler; United States
Floor exercise	Yumi Mordre; United States	Orisel Martínez; Cuba	Lisa Wittwer; United States

== Men's results ==
=== Team ===
RANK	TEAM	SCORE
Gold medal	Cuba; Lázaro Amador; Mario Castro; Roberto Richard; Jesús Rivera; Israel Sánchez; Casimiro Suárez	572.050
Silver medal	United States; Brian Babcock; Thomas Beach; Mark Caso; Mario Cutcheon; Billy Paul; Joey Ray	567.300
Bronze medal	Canada; Dave Arnold; Ives Dion; Marshall Grafield; Curtis Hibbert; Guy Lemellin; James Rozon	548.300
4.	Mexico; Ricardo Appel; José Luis Cano; Jorge Cazanes; Luis Ordoñez; Tony Pineda; Davis Romero	547.450
5.	Brazil; Gilberto Albuquerque; Pedro da Silva; Gerson Gnoatto; Guilherme Pinto; Joad Luis Ribeiro; Gilmarcio Sánchez	543.150
6.	Venezuela; José Acosta; Remigio Díaz; José Duque; Jorge Marín; Angel Quiñones; Douglas Rincón	536.650
7.	Colombia; Fernando Guerrero; Roberto Meneses; Carlos Montoya; William Montoya; Ricardo Murcia; José Tello	507.550

=== All-around ===
RANK	GYMNAST	SCORE
Gold medal	Casimiro Suarez (CUB)	116.100
Silver medal	Brian Babcock (USA)	114.300
Bronze medal	Israel Sánchez (CUB)	114.050
4.	Jesús Rivera (CUB)	113.800
5.	Billy Paul (USA)	113.200
6.	Lázaro Amador (CUB)	113.000
7.	Roberto Richard (CUB)	112.900

=== Floor exercise ===
RANK	FINAL RANKING	SCORE
Gold medal	Casimiro Suarez (CUB)	19.450
Silver medal	Jesús Rivera (CUB)	19.300
Bronze medal	Mark Caso (USA)	19.170
4.	Tony Pineda (MEX)	18.800
5.	Jorge Marín (VEN)	18.770
6.	Billy Paul (USA)	18.720
7.	Luis Ordoñez (MEX)	18.550

=== Pommel horse ===
RANK	FINAL RANKING	SCORE
Gold medal	Lázaro Amador (CUB)	19.270
Silver medal	Brian Babcock (USA)	19.120
Bronze medal	Israel Sánchez (CUB)	19.070
4.	Mario González (PUR)	18.850
5.	Joey Ray (USA)	18.700
6.	Jorge Cazanes (MEX)	18.650
7.	Marshall Grafield (CAN)	18.470

=== Rings ===
RANK	FINAL RANKING	SCORE
Gold medal	Casimiro Suarez (CUB)	19.320
Silver medal	Israel Sánchez (CUB)	19.270
Bronze medal	Mark Caso (USA)	19.200
4.	Brian Babcock (USA)	19.150
5.	Ives Dion (CAN)	18.850
6.	Tony Pineda (MEX)	18.600
7.	Anibal Hernández (PUR)	18.600

=== Vault ===
RANK	FINAL RANKING	SCORE
Gold medal	Casimiro Suarez (CUB)	19.700
Silver medal	Jorge Marín (VEN)	19.570
Bronze medal	Israel Sánchez (CUB)	19.570
4.	Mark Caso (USA)	19.470
5.	Luis Ordoñez (MEX)	19.250
6.	Ives Dion (CAN)	19.150
7.	Pedro da Silva (BRA)	19.100

=== Parallel bars ===
RANK	FINAL RANKING	SCORE
Gold medal	Roberto Richard (CUB)	19.250
Silver medal	Thomas Beach (USA)	19.570
Bronze medal	Casimiro Suárez (CUB)	19.120
4.	Ricardo Appel (MEX)	18.950
5.	Tony Pineda (MEX)	18.820
6.	Brian Babcock (USA)	18.650
7.	Anibal Hernández (PUR)	18.470

=== Horizontal bar ===
RANK	FINAL RANKING	SCORE
Gold medal	Casimiro Suarez (CUB)	19.550
Silver medal	Jesús Rivera (CUB)	19.470
Bronze medal	Billy Paul (USA)	19.350
4.	Brian Babcock (USA)	19.100
5.	Tony Pineda (MEX)	19.070
6.	Anibal Hernández (PUR)	19.050
7.	Curtis Hibbert (CAN)	18.470

== Women's results ==
=== Team ===
RANK	TEAM	SCORE
Gold medal	United States; Tracy Butler; Yumi Mordre; Cindy Rosenberry; Trina Tinti; Lucy Wener; Lisa Wittwer	378.250
Silver medal	Cuba; Elsa Chivas; Isabel Cruzata; Tania González; Orisel Martínez; Luisa Prieto; Anet Rubido	376.950
Bronze medal	Brazil; Denilce Campos; Miriam Fernández; Tatiana Figueiredo; Cláuda Magalhães; Jaqueline Pires; Altair Prado	357.350
4.	Venezuela; Yuznila Caicedo; Jenny Camejo; Adriana Díaz; Mayela Palacios; Arlene Philips; Patricia Zarzalejos	355.050
5.	Argentina; Mariana Alvarino; Karina Briozzo; Cecilia Ibarrondo; Marina Magas; Patricia Miracle; Andrea Moréton	350.000
6.	Colombia; María Capote; Diana Escobar; Liliana Muñoz; Martha Muñoz; Liliana Ramos; Lila María Vélez	314.300

=== All-around ===
RANK	GYMNAST	SCORE
Gold medal	Orisel Martínez (CUB)	76.000
Silver medal	Yumi Mordre (USA)	75.950
Bronze medal	Lisa Wittwer (USA)	75.850
4.	Elsa Chivas (CUB)	75.700
5.	Tania González (CUB)	75.350
6.	Tracy Butler (USA)	74.900
7.	Luisa Prieto (CUB)	74.550

=== Vault ===
RANK	GYMNAST	SCORE
Gold medal	Orisel Martínez (CUB)	19.425
Silver medal	Luisa Prieto (CUB)	19.400
Bronze medal	Lisa Wittwer (USA)	19.375
4.	Yumi Mordre (USA)	19.225
5.	Arlene Philips (VEN)	18.800
6.	Altair Prado (BRA)	18.725
7.	Claudiá Magalhães (BRA)	18.250

=== Uneven bars ===
RANK	GYMNAST	SCORE
Gold medal	Lucy Wener (USA)	19.400
Silver medal	Lisa Wittwer (USA)	19.275
Bronze medal	Tania González (CUB)	19.050
4.	Elsa Chivas (CUB)	18.900
5.	Jenny Camejo (VEN)	18.725
6.	Arlene Philips (VEN)	18.025
7.	Altair Prado (BRA)	17.500

=== Balance beam ===
RANK	GYMNAST	SCORE
Gold medal	Elsa Chivas (CUB)	19.275
Silver medal	Orisel Martínez (CUB)	19.000
Bronze medal	Tracy Butler (USA)	18.875
4.	Yumi Mordre (USA)	18.825
5.	Denilce Campos (BRA)	17.575
6.	Arlene Philips (VEN)	17.300
7.	Andrea Moretón (ARG)	17.075

=== Floor exercise ===
RANK	GYMNAST	SCORE
Gold medal	Yumi Mordre (USA)	19.275
Silver medal	Orisel Martínez (CUB)	19.225
Bronze medal	Lisa Wittwer (USA)	19.050
4.	Isabel Cruzata (CUB)	18.975
5.	Patricia Miracle (ARG)	18.550
6.	Jenny Camejo (VEN)	18.400
7.	Miriam Fernández (BRA)	18.075

== See also ==
- Pan American Gymnastics Championships
- South American Gymnastics Championships
- Gymnastics at the 1984 Summer Olympics
