= Cooper Kim =

American gymnast

- Kim at the 2026 U.S. National Championships

Personal information
- Born: June 16, 2006 (age 20) Lansing, Michigan, U.S.
- Height: 5 ft 7 in (170 cm)

Gymnastics career
- Discipline: Men's artistic gymnastics
- Country represented: United States; (2026–present)
- College team: Stanford Cardinal (2025–present)
- Head coach: Thom Glielmi
- Assistant coach: Rubén López
Medal record
Representing the United States
FIG World Cup
Event / 1st / 2nd / 3rd; World Challenge Cup / 1 / 0 / 0
Representing Stanford Cardinal
NCAA Championships
Gold medal – first place	2026 Champaign	Team
Gold medal – first place	2026 Champaign	Floor

Cooper Kim (born June 16, 2006) is an American gymnast. He is a member of the Stanford Cardinal men's gymnastics and United States men's national artistic gymnastics teams. He is the 2026 U.S. National Gymnastics Championships horizontal bar champion.

== Early life and education ==
Kim was a highly rated youth gymnast from central Michigan, drawing comparisons in rankings to Jordyn Wieber. He attended Grand Ledge High School in Grand Ledge, Michigan, where he was a top scholar. He later enrolled at Stanford University to pursue gymnastics.

== Gymnastics career ==
While at Stanford, Kim was a member of the Stanford Cardinal men's gymnastics team starting in 2025. He was the 2026 NCAA men's gymnastics championship winner on the floor exercise while Stanford won the team title.

In August 2026, Kim won the horizontal bar event title at the 2026 U.S. National Gymnastics Championships. He was later selected as a non-travelling alternate for the 2026 World Artistic Gymnastics Championships team. Kim made his international debut at the 2026 Paris World Challenge Cup where he won gold on horizontal bar and placed fifth on floor exercise and sixth on vault.

== Personal life ==
Kim publicly came out as gay in 2026.

== Competitive history ==
Competitive history of Cooper Kim
Year	Event	Team	AA	FX	PH	SR	VT	PB	HB
2022	U.S. National Championships (15–16)		4	1st place, gold medalist(s)	11	12	1st place, gold medalist(s)	8	3rd place, bronze medalist(s)
2023	Elite Team Cup	3rd place, bronze medalist(s)							
2023	Winter Cup			2nd place, silver medalist(s)					
2023	U.S. National Championships (17–18)		8	5	22	10	4	17	5
2024	Elite Team Cup	5							
2026	Winter Cup		20	30	27	25		28	21
2026	NCAA Championships	1st place, gold medalist(s)		1st place, gold medalist(s)			8		3rd place, bronze medalist(s)
2026	U.S. National Championships		6	4	16	23		22	1st place, gold medalist(s)
2026	Paris World Challenge Cup			5			6		1st place, gold medalist(s)
