= Yuan Xiao =

Chinese gymnastics coach

Coaching career (HC unless noted)
- 2000–2005: Oklahoma (assistant)
- 2006–2021: Michigan (assistant)
- 2022–present: Michigan

Accomplishments and honors

Awards
- 3× Big Ten Coach of the Year (2022–2024)

Yuan Xiao is a Chinese born gymnastics coach, who is the head coach of the Michigan Wolverines men's gymnastics team and assistant coach for the United States men's national artistic gymnastics team.

== Coaching career ==
Xiao began his coaching career as a coach for China men's national artistic gymnastics team, a position he held from 1994 until 1999. In 1999, he moved to Houston, Texas to coach at the Houston Gymnastics Academy.

On October 19, 2000, Xiao was named a coach for the Oklahoma Sooners men's gymnastics team. While at Oklahoma, he helped lead the team to NCAA championships in 2002, 2003 and 2005, and runner-up finishes in 2001 and 2004.

After five years as a coach at Oklahoma, on August 5, 2005, he was named an assistant coach for the Michigan Wolverines men's gymnastics team. On April 25, 2022, Xiao was promoted to head coach, agreeing to a five-year contract through the 2027 season. As head coach at Michigan, he has led the Wolverines to three consecutive Big Ten Conference championships and three consecutive Big Ten Conference Coach of the Year awards.

On June 1, 2023, Xiao was named head coach for the United States men's national artistic gymnastics team at the 2023 Summer World University Games. However, the event was cancelled due to the Russian invasion of Ukraine. He served as an assistant coach for the United States at the 2024 Summer Olympics. Team USA's won a bronze medal in the team all-around, their first in the event since 2008.

== Personal life ==
Xiao and his wife, Julia, a former Cirque du Soleil performer, have two daughters.
