= 1980 South American Artistic Gymnastics Championships =

International artistic gymnastics competition

The 1980 South American Artistic Gymnastics Championships were held in Santiago, Chile, December 1980. It was the fifth edition of the South American Artistic Gymnastics Championships.

== Participating nations ==
- Argentina
- Bolivia
- Brazil
- Chile
- Ecuador
- Peru
- Venezuela

== Medalists ==
| Event | Gold | Silver | Bronze |
|---|---|---|---|
Men
| Team all-around | Brazil; João Luís Ribeiro; João Levi; João Machado; Hélio Araújo; Carlos Henrique Silvestre; Mário Tomás; Ulisses Schlosser | Venezuela; Hebert Hoeger; Angel Quinones; Jorge Marin | Chile; Eduardo Navarro |
| Individual all-around | Hélio Araújo (BRA) | Hebert Hoeger (VEN) | Ulisses Schlosser (BRA) João Luís Ribeiro (BRA) |
| Floor exercise | Hélio Araújo (BRA) | Hebert Hoeger (VEN) | João Machado (BRA) |
| Pommel horse | Ulisses Schlosser (BRA) | Hebert Hoeger (VEN) | Angel Quinones (VEN) |
| Rings | João Machado (BRA) | Angel Quinones (VEN) | Jorge Marin (VEN) |
| Vault | Hélio Araújo (BRA) | Hebert Hoeger (VEN) | Jorge Marin (VEN) |
| Parallel bars | Eduardo Navarro (CHI) | Hebert Hoeger (VEN) | João Machado (BRA) |
| Horizontal bar | Ulisses Schlosser (BRA) | Hélio Araújo (BRA) | Hebert Hoeger (VEN) |
Women
| Team all-around | Brazil; Silvia dos Anjos; Altair Prado; Cláudia Magalhães; Denilce Campos; Marian Fernandes; Lilian Carrascosa; Jacqueline Pires | Chile | Argentina; Patricia Miracle; Andrea Moretón; Marina Magas |
| Individual all-around | Lilian Carrascosa (BRA) Marian Fernandes (BRA) | None awarded | Altair Prado (BRA) |
| Vault | Altair Prado (BRA) | Jacqueline Pires (BRA) | Patricia Miracle (ARG) |
| Uneven bars | Silvia dos Anjos (BRA) | Altair Prado (BRA) | Minerva Valcarce (VEN) |
| Balance beam | Marian Fernandes (BRA) | Lilian Carrascosa (BRA) | Patricia Miracle (ARG) |
| Floor exercise | Lilian Carrascosa (BRA) | Marian Fernandes (BRA) | Patricia Miracle (ARG) |
