= Gymnastics at the 1982 South American Games =

Gymnastics events were competed at the 1982 Southern Cross Games in Rosario, Argentina.

== Medal summary ==
=== Medal table ===
Rank	Nation	Gold	Silver	Bronze	Total
1	Brazil (BRA)	14	8	3	25
2	Argentina (ARG)	0	4	5	9
3	Chile (CHI)	0	2	3	5
4	Ecuador (ECU)	0	0	2	2
5	Peru (PER)	0	0	1	1
Totals (5 entries)		14	14	14	42

=== Artistic gymnastics ===
==== Men ====
Event	Gold	Silver	Bronze
Team all-around	Brazil; Hélio Araújo; Fernando Moreira; João Vicente Machado; Gerson Gnoatto; Pedro Ruhs; Roberto Nassar	Argentina; Miguel Costante; Miguel Lalanne; Raimundo Blanco; Daniel Chu; Néstor Schettino; Fernando Molinari	Chile; Marcelo Toledo
Individual all-around	Pedro Ruhs (BRA)	Gerson Gnoatto (BRA)	Hélio Araújo (BRA)
Floor exercise	Hélio Araújo (BRA)	Pedro Ruhs (BRA)	Raimundo Blanco (ARG)
Pommel horse	Fernando Moreira (BRA)	Marcelo Toledo (CHI)	Iván Ayala (ECU)
Rings	Pedro Ruhs (BRA)	Gerson Gnoatto (BRA)	Marcelo Toledo (CHI)
Vault	Pedro Ruhs (BRA)	Hélio Araújo (BRA)	Marcelo Toledo (CHI)
Parallel bars	Gerson Gnoatto (BRA)	Marcelo Toledo (CHI)	Pedro Ruhs (BRA)
Horizontal bar	Gerson Gnoatto (BRA)	Raimundo Blanco (ARG)	Iván Ayala (ECU)

==== Women ====
Event	Gold	Silver	Bronze
Team all-around	Brazil; Jaqueline Pires; Altair Prado; Cláudia Magalhães; Denilce Campos; Tatiana Figueiredo; Marcela Alonso	Argentina; Patricia Miracle; Andrea Moretón; Cecilia Ibarrondo; Marina Magas; Carina López; Karina Briozzo	Peru
Individual all-around	Altair Prado (BRA)	Jaqueline Pires (BRA)	Patricia Miracle (ARG)
Vault	Jaqueline Pires (BRA)	Altair Prado (BRA)	Patricia Miracle (ARG)
Uneven bars	Altair Prado (BRA)	Jaqueline Pires (BRA)	Tatiana Figueiredo (BRA)
Balance beam	Altair Prado (BRA)	Patricia Miracle (ARG)	Andrea Moretón (ARG)
Floor exercise	Jaqueline Pires (BRA)	Altair Prado (BRA)	Patricia Miracle (ARG)
