= Brian Babcock =

American artistic gymnast

- Born: July 11, 1960 Garden City, Kansas, U.S.
- Died: October 18, 1998 (aged 38) Webster, Texas, U.S.
- Height: 5 ft 10 in (178 cm)

Gymnastics career
- Discipline: Men's artistic gymnastics
- Country represented: United States
- College team: Southern Illinois Salukis (1978–1983)
- Gym: Garden City School of Gymnastics
- Head coach: Bill Meade
- Former coach: Mike Thomas
- Retired: June 1988
Medal record
Men's artistic gymnastics
Representing United States
Event	1st	2nd	3rd
Pan American Games	0	3	0
Total	0	3	0
Pan American Games
Silver medal – second place	1983 Caracas	Team
Silver medal – second place	1983 Caracas	All-around
Silver medal – second place	1983 Caracas	Pommel horse

Brian Babcock (July 11, 1960 – October 18, 1998) was a former American artistic gymnast and member of the United States men's national artistic gymnastics team. He won the 1985 USA Gymnastics National Championships.

== Early life and education ==
Babcock was born in Garden City, Kansas. He started gymnastics at age 13 at the Garden City School of gymnastics under Mike Thomas. Babcock attended, and graduated from, Garden City High School. He was recruited by Oklahoma, but Babcock chose to attend Southern Illinois University Carbondale to pursue gymnastics.

== Career ==
=== College gymnastics ===
Babcock was a member of the Southern Illinois Salukis men's gymnastics team from 1978 to 1983, including a medical redshirt year, under head coach Bill Meade. In 1981, Babcock was the NCAA men's gymnastics championships silver medalist on the horizontal bar.

In 1983, he tied for the NCAA silver medal on parallel bars and won the bronze on horizontal bar en route to a bronze medal finish in the all-around. He earned a bachelor's degree in 1983 and a master's in 1989 and served as an assistant coach for the gymnastics team once his collegiate eligibility expired.

=== National and global gymnastics ===
Babcock was a member of the United States men's national artistic gymnastics team and won a silver medal on the pommel horse and all-around at the 1983 Pan American Games. He overcame knee injuries and was champion of the 1985 U.S. National Gymnastics Championships. In 1986, Babcock was a member of the United States delegation for gymnastics at the 1986 Goodwill Games, the first time the games were held, where he placed sixth on the pommel horse.

Babcock retired from gymnastics competition in June 1988.

=== Coaching ===
In 1989, Babcock joined Dan Hayden and Dennis Hayden to coach at Parkettes National Gymnastics Training Center. He coached at the organization for seven years before co-founding the Texas Sports Ranch in Houston.

== Death ==
On October 18, 1998, Babcock died of complications from a bone marrow transplant to fight myelodysplastic syndrome at his home in Webster, Texas.
