= Mario McCutcheon =

American artistic gymnast

- Born: 1957 or 1958 (age 68–69) Georgia, U.S.

Gymnastics career
- Discipline: Men's artistic gymnastics
- Country represented: United States
- College team: Southern Connecticut State College Owls
- Head coach: Abie Grossfeld
Medal record
Men's artistic gymnastics
Representing United States
Event	1st	2nd	3rd
Pan American Games	0	1	0
Total	0	1	0
Pan American Games
Silver medal – second place	1983 Caracas	Team
- Awards: Nissen-Emery Award (1980)

Mario McCutcheon (born 1957 or 1958) is a retired American artistic gymnast. He was the United States horizontal bar champion in 1983. He was a member of the United States men's national artistic gymnastics team and won a silver medal at the 1983 Pan American Games.

== Early life and education ==
McCutcheon was born in 1957 or 1958 in Georgia. The second oldest of seven children, McCutcheon was raised in The Bronx, New York. His father died when he was five and the family was on welfare.

McCutcheon started gymnastics later in childhood and had limited experience through middle school. After witnessing the sport of gymnastics, he became interested and took it up at 16 years old. He attended DeWitt Clinton High School, where he quickly became the school's best gymnast. He was recruited by, and offered full scholarships from, Indiana State University, Louisiana State University, and Iowa State University, but ultimately chose to enroll at Southern Connecticut State College to pursue gymnastics after high school graduation.

== Gymnastics career ==
While a student at Southern Connecticut State College, he was a member of the Owls men's gymnastics team under coach Abie Grossfeld. He was the winner of the 1980 Nissen-Emery Award, given to the top senior collegiate gymnast.

At the 1982 U.S. National Sports Festival, McCutcheon was able to perform in front of his brother and sister whom he hadn't seen in over a decade. He won six medals, giving away one each to his brother and sister in attendance. McCutcheon was the 1983 United States horizontal bar champion.

Internationally, McCutcheon was a member of the United States men's national artistic gymnastics team. He was an alternate member for the 1981 and 1983 World Artistic Gymnastics Championships teams. He represented the United States at the 1983 Pan American Games and won a silver medal.

He was inducted into the Southern Connecticut Owls hall of fame in 2001.
