= Asher Cohen (gymnast) =

American artistic gymnast

- Cohen at the 2026 U.S. National Championships

Personal information
- Born: January 18, 2004 (age 22) Denver, Colorado, U.S.
- Height: 5 ft 4 in (163 cm)

Gymnastics career
- Discipline: Men's artistic gymnastics
- Country represented: United States; (2026–present)
- College team: Nebraska Cornhuskers (2023–2026)
- Gym: 5280 Gymnastics
- Head coach: Chuck Chmelka
- Former coaches: Vladimir Artemev; Alexander Artemev
Medal record
Representing Nebraska Cornhuskers
NCAA Championships
Gold medal – first place	2026 Champaign	Rings

Asher Cohen (born January 18, 2004) is an American gymnast. He is a member of the United States men's national artistic gymnastics team and previously competed for the Nebraska Cornhuskers men's gymnastics team. He is the 2026 U.S. National Gymnastics Championships still rings champion.

== Early life and education ==
Cohen attended Wheat Ridge High School. He later enrolled at University of Nebraska–Lincoln to pursue gymnastics.

== Gymnastics career ==
While at Nebraska, Cohen was a member of the Nebraska Cornhuskers men's gymnastics team from 2023 to 2026. He was the 2026 NCAA men's gymnastics championship winner on the still rings exercise. It was the first national championship on the still rings for Nebraska since Jim Hartung, who was serving as Nebraska's assistant coach when he died during the 2026 season. He was a finalist for the 2026 Nissen-Emery Award.

In August 2026, Cohen won the still rings event title at the 2026 U.S. National Gymnastics Championships.
