= William Tate (academic) =

American academic (1903–1980)

- Born: September 21, 1903; Calhoun, Georgia, U.S.
- Died: September 21, 1980 (aged 77); Athens, Georgia, U.S.
- Occupation: Academic
- Spouse: Susan Frances Barrow (m. 1932)
- Children: 2
- Parent(s): Philip May Tate; Edna F. Tate

Academic background
- Education: Georgia Military Academy; University of Georgia (AB, MA)

William "Bill" Tate (September 21, 1903 – September 21, 1980) was an American academic who served as the dean of men at the University of Georgia (UGA) in Athens, Georgia, from 1946 until 1971.

== Early Life ==
Tate was born in 1903 in Calhoun, Georgia. His father, Philip May Tate, was a member of the Tate family that had developed the Georgia Marble Company in Pickens County, Georgia, but Mr. Tate himself was a banker and farmer, having established the Calhoun National Bank. Upon his death in 1911 his widow, Mrs. Edna F. Tate, became president of the bank and managed the farm. William attended Fairmount High School and the Georgia Military Academy, from which he graduated in 1920. He entered the University of Georgia, securing his A.B. degree in 1924 and his M.A. in 1927. He did graduate work at Columbia University, Harvard University and the University of Chicago.

As an undergraduate, Tate was a member of the track team and a distance runner, holding the A.A.U. Cross Country Championship. He was president of the Phi Kappa Literary Society and a holder of its speaking key. He was a member of the Phi Beta Kappa, Phi Kappa Phi, Sphinx, Delta Tau Delta fraternity, and Omicron Delta Kappa.

== Career ==
From 1924 to 1929 he was an instructor in English and debate coach at the University of Georgia. From 1929 to 1936 he was head of the English Department and track coach at The McCallie School in Chattanooga, Tennessee. In 1932 Tate married Susan Frances Barrow, a granddaughter of university chancellor David Barrow. They had two sons, Ben and Jeff. In 1936 he returned to the University of Georgia as dean of freshmen and assistant professor of English. He was dean of students, assistant to the president, and in 1946 became the dean of men, a position he held for two decades.

Tate was described as one of the university's ablest and most popular staff members since he served as the communication bridge between the university administration and the students. During his tenure as dean of men, Tate had nearly unlimited authority over student conduct. He devoted much of his time to personal conferences with students, individually and in groups. A favorite quotation of Dean Tate, in reference to his work with young men at the university, was: "Working with a sorry boy who won't try ...is like going bird hunting and having to 'tote the dogs!".

Tate was instrumental in the peaceful integration of the campus in 1961 by maintaining close supervision of student protesters. Tate walked into a mob outside Myers Hall, and as he was pelted with rocks, he assisted a policeman who had been knocked to the ground then moved through the crowd seizing identification cards and remembering names and faces. The university's first two African-American students were Charlayne Hunter and Hamilton Holmes.

=== Retirement ===
Upon his retirement in 1971, Tate joined the university's alumni office and embarked on an intensive public speaking career. His goal, in addition to raising money for the university, was to enhance citizens' understanding of the profound social changes that were occurring throughout the state and on the university campus in particular. Dean Tate brought his deep understanding of human nature to his narrations. He was a gifted storyteller drawing upon a rich memory of events. In 1975 he published the volume Strolls Around Athens.

== Honors ==
In 1981, the Tate Student Center on the UGA campus was named in honor of Tate. In 1990, the Dean William Tate Honor Society was formed as a lasting legacy to Tate and his impact on students at the University of Georgia. It annually inducts the top twelve freshmen men and top twelve freshmen women at the university, determined through a comprehensive application and interview process.
