= Tom Beach =

American gymnast (born 1955)

- Full name: Thomas Applegate Beach
- Born: January 18, 1955 (age 71) Buffalo, New York, U.S.
- Height: 1.66 m (5 ft 5 in)

Gymnastics career
- Discipline: Men's artistic gymnastics
- Country represented: United States
- College team: California Golden Bears (1974–1977)
- Club: South Torrance High School
- Head coach: Harold Frey
- Assistant coach: Mas Watanabe
- Retired: c. 1984
Medal record
Men's artistic gymnastics
Representing United States
Event	1st	2nd	3rd
Pan American Games	0	2	0
Total	0	2	0
Pan American Games
Silver medal – second place	1983 Caracas	Team
Silver medal – second place	1983 Caracas	Parallel bars

Thomas Applegate Beach (born January 18, 1955) is an American gymnast. He was a member of the United States men's national artistic gymnastics team and competed in eight events at the 1976 Summer Olympics.

== Early life and education ==
Beach was born on January 18, 1955, in Buffalo, New York, and started gymnastics before he was six years old. He grew up in Torrance, California and attended South Torrance High School and was a highly sought after gymnastics recruit.

Beach competed at the 1984 United States Olympic trials but was not selected for the 1984 Summer Olympics team after he placed 21st in the all-around.
