= Fred Roethlisberger =

American gymnastics coach

- Full name: Frederick Adolph Roethlisberger
- Born: February 28, 1943 (age 83) Milwaukee, Wisconsin, U.S.
- Height: 170 cm (5 ft 7 in)

Gymnastics career
- Discipline: Men's artistic gymnastics
- Country represented: United States
- College team: Wisconsin Badgers
- Gym: Milwaukee Turners
Medal record
Men's artistic gymnastics
Representing United States
Event	1st	2nd	3rd
Pan American Games	4	1	1
Total	4	1	1
Pan American Games
Gold medal – first place	1967 Winnipeg	Team
Gold medal – first place	1967 Winnipeg	All-around
Gold medal – first place	1967 Winnipeg	Parallel bars
Gold medal – first place	1967 Winnipeg	Horizontal bar
Silver medal – second place	1967 Winnipeg	Rings
Bronze medal – third place	1967 Winnipeg	Vault

Frederick Adolph Roethlisberger (born February 28, 1943, in Milwaukee, Wisconsin) is an American former gymnastics coach and athlete. He was a member of the United States men's national artistic gymnastics team and competed in gymnastics at the 1968 Summer Olympics. Later, he became the gymnastics coach for Minnesota's "Golden Gophers" for 33 years. He was inducted to the Wisconsin Athletic Hall of Fame in 1990. His son, John Roethlisberger, is a three-time Olympian.
