= Dave Thor =

American gymnast

- Full name: David Boyd Thor
- Born: February 20, 1947 (age 79) Van Nuys, California, U.S.
- Height: 183 cm (6 ft 0 in)

Gymnastics career
- Discipline: Men's artistic gymnastics
- Country represented: United States
- College team: Michigan State Spartans
Medal record
Men's artistic gymnastics
Representing United States
Event	1st	2nd	3rd
Pan American Games	1	0	4
Total	1	0	4
Pan American Games
Gold medal – first place	1967 Winnipeg	Team
Bronze medal – third place	1967 Winnipeg	All-around
Bronze medal – third place	1967 Winnipeg	Floor
Bronze medal – third place	1967 Winnipeg	Horizontal bar
Bronze medal – third place	1967 Winnipeg	Pommel horse

Dave Thor (born February 20, 1947) is an American gymnast. He was a member of the United States men's national artistic gymnastics team and competed in eight events at the 1968 Summer Olympics.
