= Robert W. Emery =

American artistic gymnast and surgeon

Dr. Robert Emery is a former collegiate gymnast. He competed for Penn State University and earned the Nissen Award (the "Heisman" of NCAA men's gymnastics) in 1969. In 1998, Emery funded an ongoing endowment for the Nissen Award, which is now renamed the Nissen-Emery Award.

Emery is currently a heart surgeon. He was named outstanding science alumni of Penn State for 1996 and an Alumni Fellow in 2003. He is a founding member and past president of the International Society for Minimally Invasive Cardiac Surgery.
