= 1982 Southern Cross Games =

Multi-sport event in Rosario, Argentina

II Southern Cross Games
- The official logo of the 1982 Southern Cross Games
- Host city: Rosario
- Country: Argentina
- Nations: 10
- Athletes: 961
- Events: 249 in 20 sports
- Opening: November 26, 1982
- Closing: December 5, 1982
- Opened by: Reynaldo Bignone; President of Argentina (de facto)
- Torch lighter: Gerardo Constantini
- Main venue: Estadio Gigante de Arroyito

The II Southern Cross Games (Spanish: Juegos Cruz del Sur) were a multi-sport event held in 1982 in Rosario, Argentina, with some events in Santa Fe, Buenos Aires (sailing) and Esperanza. This was the second and last edition under this name of what would be renamed the South American Games, organized by the South American Sports Organization (ODESUR). An appraisal of the games and detailed medal lists were published elsewhere, emphasizing the results of the Argentinian teams. Torch lighter was rower Gerardo Constantini.

Colombia and Venezuela had their first appearance at the games resulting in a total of 10 teams participating.

== Venues ==
The Estadio Gigante de Arroyito was the main venues of the games, hosting the opening ceremony and the football tournaments. Many events were held at different venues located within the limits of Parque de la Independencia, the largest and most important public park in the city, including Newell's Old Boys' and Club Atlético Provincial's indoor arenas, both opened in 1982 to host the event. The Jorge Newbery Municipal Sports Complex, also in the park, hosted the swimming and tennis, while the recently opened Patinódromo Municipal "Roberto Tagliabué" (Municipal Skating Rink) was the site for roller sports events.

The city of Santa Fe hosted the sailing events, the Centro de Alto Rendimiento Deportivo Pedro Candioti (Card) was the venue for athletics and the stadium of National Technological University – Santa Fe Regional Faculty held volleyball matches.

== Participants ==
10 ODESUR member participated Colombia and Venezuela participated debuted on the games, 961 althletes competed on the games

- Argentina
- Bolivia
- Brazil
- Chile
- Colombia
- Ecuador
- Paraguay
- Peru
- Uruguay
- Venezuela

== Medal count ==
The medal count for these Games is tabulated below. This table is sorted by the number of gold medals earned by each country. The number of silver medals is taken into consideration next, and then the number of bronze medals.

* Host nation (Argentina)

Rank	Nation	Gold	Silver	Bronze	Total
1	Argentina (ARG)*	114	92	66	272
2	Chile (CHI)	37	51	47	135
3	Peru (PER)	30	18	27	75
4	Brazil (BRA)	29	34	12	75
5	Uruguay (URU)	13	17	21	51
6	Ecuador (ECU)	11	14	12	37
7	Venezuela (VEN)	8	3	13	24
8	Colombia (COL)	6	2	6	14
9	Bolivia (BOL)	1	1	8	10
10	Paraguay (PAR)	0	3	3	6
Totals (10 entries)		249	235	215	699

== Sports ==
A total number of 961 athletes from 10 countries competed for medals in twenty sports:

- Aquatic sports
  - Swimming
  - Synchronized swimming
- Athletics
- Baseball^{†}
- Basketball^{†}
- Boxing
- Cycling
  - Road Cycling
  - Track Cycling
- Equestrian^{‡}
- Fencing
- Football^{†}
- Gymnastics
  - Artistic gymnastics
  - Trampoline
- Judo^{†}
- Roller sports
  - Artistic roller skating
  - Roller hockey
  - Roller speed skating
- Rowing
- Sailing
- Shooting
- Table tennis
- Tennis^{†}
- Volleyball^{†}
- Weightlifting
- Wrestling

=== Notes ===
^{†}: Competition reserved to junior representatives (U-20).

^{‡}: Equestrian is not explicitly listed in the overview of the competitions held at the 1982 games. However, medal winners are published for individual and team show jumping events.
