= Michigan Wolverines men's gymnastics =

Men's gymnastics team of the University of Michigan

Michigan Wolverines Men's Gymnastics
- Founded: 1931 (94 years ago)
- University: University of Michigan
- Head coach: Yuan Xiao (3rd season)
- Conference: Big Ten
- Location: Ann Arbor, Michigan
- Home arena: Cliff Keen Arena (Capacity: 1,800)
- Nickname: Wolverines
- Colors: Maize and blue

National championships
- 1963, 1970, 1999, 2010, 2013, 2014, 2025 Trampoline: 1969, 1970

Conference championships
- 1961, 1962, 1963, 1964, 1965, 1966, 1968, 1969, 1970, 1971, 1973, 1975, 1999, 2000, 2009, 2013, 2014, 2021, 2022, 2023, 2024, 2025

The Michigan Wolverines men's gymnastics team represents the University of Michigan and competes in the Big Ten Conference. The Wolverines have won seven NCAA championships, 21 Big Ten championships and have been invited to 32 NCAA tournaments. Since 1999, Michigan has finished in the Super Six at the NCAA tournament in 11 of 12 seasons. In 2013, Michigan won its fifth NCAA men's gymnastics team championship. The following year, Michigan repeated as National Champions for its sixth NCAA men's gymnastics team championship.

== History ==
The Michigan Wolverines men's gymnastics team has had five coaches in 65 years of competition: Wilbur West (1931–1933); Newt Loken (1948–1983); Bob Darden (1984–1996); and Kurt Golder (1997–2022), Yuan Xiao (2022–present).

=== West era (1931–1933) ===
Wilbur West was Michigan's first men's gymnastics coach. In three years under West, the team compiled a record of 1–10. After the 1933 season, the gymnastics program was discontinued and was not resumed until 1948.

=== Loken era (1948–1983) ===
Newt Loken came to the University of Michigan in 1944 as a master's degree student. On the side, he coached the cheerleading team. At the time of Loken's arrival, Michigan did not have a men's gymnastics program. In 1947, the athletic board awarded varsity status to men's gymnastics, and Loken was named the head coach.

Loken remained the coach of Michigan's men's gymnastics team for 36 years and compiled a record of 250–72–1. His teams won NCAA men's gymnastics championships in 1963 and 1970 and 12 Big Ten championships. Loken coached 71 Big Ten individual event winners and 21 NCAA individual event winners.

In 1963, the Wolverines compiled a 6–0 in the regular season and won the Big Ten championship with 210.50 points. They went on to win the NCAA championship with a score of 129 points. The 1963 team also won six NCAA individual championships.

In 1970, the team compiled a perfect 12–0 record and won its second team championship with 164.150 points in the NCAA tournament.

Loken also coached the cheerleading team at Michigan as well as the varsity sport of trampoline. From 1947 through 1964, trampoline was included as an event in gymnastics competitions by both the AAU and NCAA. The first trampoline world championships were held in 1964. Loken led the Michigan trampoline team to NCAA championships in 1969 and 1970. Loken produced more trampoline champions and world medal winners than any other collegiate coach.

As of 2007, the 88-year-old Loken was still a regular at Michigan's men's gymnastics practices and events, and it was reported that he had not missed a Michigan home meet from 1948 to 2007. Assistant coach Scott Vetere said: "He knows everybody on the team, and if he forgets, he's 80-some years old, and he'll ask again. He's just a pure gymnastics guy – always wants to be around gymnastics, always wants to learn more, (always) wants to praise guys for what a wonderful job they're doing."

=== Darden era (1984–1996) ===
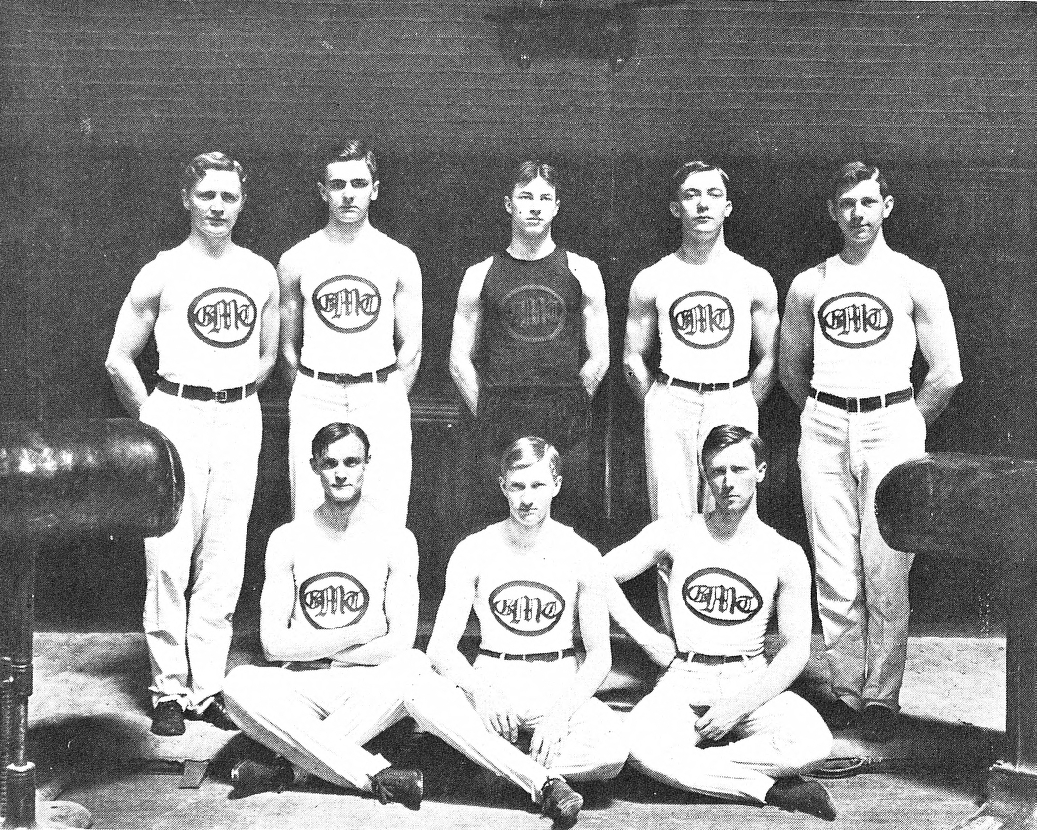
1906–1907 Michigan men's gymnastics team

Bob Darden (1984–1996) was head coach for 13 seasons. During Darden's tenure as head coach, the Wolverines compiled a record of 76–111–1 and had no Big Ten championships or NCAA tournament berths.

=== Golder era (1997–2021) ===
Kurt Golder took over as Michigan's head coach in 1997. After Michigan finished the 1996 season with an 0–11 record, Golder quickly turned the program around. In 14 seasons from 1997 to 2010, Golder has led the Wolverines to a record of 246–166–1, four Big Ten championships, 10 NCAA tournament berths and two NCAA national championships. Since 1999, Golder's teams have finished in the Super Six at the NCAA tournament in 10 of 11 years.

In 1999, Kurt Golder led the Wolverines to a 19–5 record in the regular season. The 1999 team went on to win the school's third team gymnastics championship with season-best 232.55 points in the NCAA tournament. The runner up was Ohio State, which finished with 230.85 points. Justin Toman was Michigan's leader at the 1999 tournament with a score of 58.075. The NCAA championship came just three years after a winless season in 1996. Golder was credited with taking over the program and building it into "a national powerhouse." Upon winning the 1999 NCAA championship, Golder told the press, "The plan was to get here in the fourth year and be in contention in the fifth year. We got lucky and got some great recruits. Everything fell into place."

The 2009 Wolverines finished #2 as the runner-up at the NCAA tournament. Michigan gymnast Thomas Kelley was named Big Ten Gymnast of the Year in 2009.

The 2010 Wolverines won the NCAA men's gymnastics national championship, defeating the second place team from Stanford University by 0.7 points. Michigan gymnast Chris Cameron also won the all-around title with 90.500 points, including 15.450 on the rings and vaulting, 15.150 on parallel bars, 15.050 on pommel horse, and 13.800 on the horizontal bar.

The 2011 Wolverines finished second in the Big Ten and fifth at the NCAA men's gymnastics championship. The highlight of this season was freshman Sam Mikulak who won both the Big Ten and NCAA all-around titles. Sam was the first freshman in NCAA history to win the all-around title.

The 2013 Wolverines won their 16th Big Ten Championship behind an NCAA record-setting 15.95 performance on parallel bars from junior Sam Mikulak and a 1–2 all-around competition finish from Mikulak and sophomore Adrian de los Angeles. On April 20, 2013, behind Sam Mikulak's second career NCAA all-around crown and a runner-up performance from Adrian de los Angeles, the team claimed the program's fifth national title.

The 2014 Wolverines captured their 17th Big Ten Championship to become the first back-to-back conference champions since the 1999–2000 team. Senior Sam Mikulak broke two NCAA records with a 93.70 all around score and a 16.1 parallel bar score. Twenty of the thirty competed routines qualified into the individual event finals the following day, a record breaking number. Gymnasts that qualified included: Syque Caesar (vault, parallel bars, high bar), Sam Mikulak (all six events), Paul Rizkalla Jr. (vault), Tristian Perez-Rivera (vault, floor), Konner Ackerman (vault), Jordan Gaarenstroom (parallel bars, still rings), Nicholas Hunter (parallel bars, pommel horse), Colin Mahar (still rings), Alex Bubnov (still rings), Nolan Novak (pommel horse) and Matt Freeman (pommel horse). Freshman Tristian Perez-Rivera and Junior Paul Rizkalla Jr. placed second on floor and vault respectively while senior Sam Mikulak and sixth year senior Syque Caesar tied for third place on parallel bars.

The 2021 Wolverines captured their 18th Big Ten Championship. Michigan won the meet by 13 points, the largest margin of victory in the championship since 1977. Senior Cameron Bock tied for the all-around title and won pommel horse and still rings. Sophomore Paul Juda took third in the all-around and placed second on parallel bars and high bar. On November 29, 2021, Golder announced his retirement after 25 seasons with the Wolverines. He led the Wolverines to four NCAA championships (1999, 2010, 2013, 2014) and six Big Ten Conference titles.

=== Xiao era (2022–present) ===
The 2022 Wolverines captured their 19th Big Ten Championship. Junior Paul Juda won the all-around competition with a cumulative score of 85.350, while teammate Jacob Moore took third.

On April 25, 2022, Xiao was promoted to head coach, agreeing to a five-year contract through the 2027 season.

== Coaches ==
Name	Position	Seasons
Yuan Xiao	Head coach	2021–present
Jordan Gaarenstroom	Assistant coach	2019–present
Juha Tanskanen	Assistant coach	2022–present

== Roster ==
2026–2027 Roster
Name	Year	Hometown	Gym
Jay Asrani	FR	Plymouth, MN	Mini Hops Gymnastics
Landen Blixt	GR	Fowlerville, MI	Infinity
Solen Chiodi	JR	Marquette, MI	Mini Hops
Kevin Chow	SR	Des Moines, IA	Chow
Carson Eshleman	JR	Monroe, MI	Michigan Elite
Joseph Hale	SO	Copperas Cove, TX	Crenshaw Athletic Club
Troy Holman	FR	Bakersfield, CA	Bakersfield Gymnastics
Eyal Indig	FR	Tel Aviv, Israel	Maccabi Tel Aviv
Jake Islam	SR	Suffield, CT	Western Mass
Alex Istock	SR	Burlingame, CA	Bayshore
Cameron Klimmek	JR	Ramsey, MN	Mini Hops
Adam Lakomy	SO	Roselle Park, NJ	Sunburst Gymnastics
Charlie Larson	SR	White Bear Lake, MN	Twin City Twisters
Aaronson Mansberger	JR	Carmel, IN	Interactive
Eli Osuna	SO	Williamsburg, VA	Williamsburg Gymnastics
Chase Pappas	SO	Franklin, TN	Harpeth Gymnastics
Akshay Puri	SR	Chicago, IL	Lakeshore
Carlos Rolka	FR	Carrolton, GA	Roswell Gymnastics
Kyle Walchuk	SR	Seabrook, TX	Infinity
Pierce Wolfgang	SR	Bryn Mawr, PA	Liberty Bell
Will Young	SR	Albuquerque, NM	Eagle Ridge

== Awards and honors ==
=== National awards ===
Nissen-Emery Award

- 2002: Justin Toman
- 2014: Sam Mikulak
- 2023: Paul Juda
- 2026: Fred Richard

=== Conference awards ===
Big Ten Gymnast of the Year

- 2000: Scott Vetere
- 2005: Justin Laury
- 2009: Thomas Kelley
- 2010: Chris Cameron
- 2011: Sam Mikulak
- 2013: Sam Mikulak
- 2014: Sam Mikulak
- 2021: Paul Juda
- 2022: Paul Juda

Big Ten Freshman of the Year

- 1989: Louie Ball
- 1998: Kevin Roulston
- 1999: Scott Vetere
- 2003: Justin Laury
- 2008: Thomas Kelley
- 2011: Sam Mikulak
- 2020: Paul Juda
- 2023: Fred Richard

Big Ten Coach of the Year

- 1999: Kurt Golder
- 2000: Kurt Golder
- 2013: Kurt Golder
- 2014: Kurt Golder
- 2020: Kurt Golder
- 2022: Yuan Xiao
- 2023: Yuan Xiao
- 2024: Yuan Xiao

== NCAA individual event champions ==
Michigan has had 23 gymnasts who have won NCAA individual championships.

- 1949: Edsel Buchanan – trampoline
- 1950: Edsel Buchanan – trampoline
- 1951: Edsel Buchanan – trampoline
- 1959: Ed Cole – trampoline
- 1963: Gary Erwin – trampoline
- 1963: Mike Henderson – floor exercise
- 1963: Gil LaRose – vault, horizontal bar, all-around
- 1963: Arno Lascari – parallel bars
- 1964: Gary Erwin – trampoline
- 1966: Wayne Miller – trampoline
- 1967: Dave Jacobs – floor exercise, trampoline
- 1968: George Huntzicker – trampoline
- 1969: Dave Jacobs – trampoline
- 1969: Ron Rapper – parallel bars
- 1970: George Huntzicker – trampoline
- 1970: Ron Rapper – parallel bars
- 1978: John Corritore – parallel bars
- 1992: Brian Winkler – floor exercise
- 1999: Justin Toman – parallel bars
- 2000: Justin Toman – parallel bars
- 2000: Kris Zimmerman – parallel bars
- 2002: Daniel Diaz-Luong – horizontal bar
- 2003: Andrew DiGiore – vault
- 2010: Ryan McCarthy – horizontal bar
- 2010: Chris Cameron – all-around
- 2011: Sam Mikulak – all-around
- 2013: Sam Mikulak – all-around, parallel bars, high bar
- 2014: Sam Mikulak – all-around
- 2016: Anthony McCallum - vault
- 2017: Anthony McCallum - vault
- 2019: Anthony McCallum - vault
- 2022: Paul Juda – all-around, vault
- 2023: Fred Richard – all-around, parallel bars, horizontal bar
- 2024: Paul Juda – floor
- 2025: Fred Richard – all-around
- 2025: Paul Juda – parallel bars
- 2026: Fred Richard – all-around

== National Team Members ==
Michigan has had numerous gymnasts who have been a part of the USA National Team.

- Justin Toman: 1998–2003
- Scott Vetere: 1999–2000
- Daniel Diaz-Luong: 2001
- Kris Zimmerman: 2001
- Chris Cameron: 2009–2011
- Sam Mikulak: 2011–2021
- Adrian de los Angeles: 2012
- Stacey Ervin: 2013–2014
- Cameron Bock: 2018–2022
- Paul Juda: 2020–2025
- Fred Richard: 2022–present

== Michigan gymnasts at the Olympics ==
=== Olympians ===
Year	Country	Name	Medal(s)
2012	Bangladesh	Syque Caesar	
2012	United States	Sam Mikulak	
2016	United States	Sam Mikulak	
2020	Nigeria	Uche Eke	
2020	United States	Sam Mikulak	
2024	Bulgaria	Kevin Penev	
2024	Syria	Lais Najjar	
2024	United States	Paul Juda	team
2024	United States	Fred Richard	team

=== Alternates ===
Year	Country	Name
2020	United States	Cameron Bock
