= Nissen-Emery Award =

American collegiate gymnastics award

- Awarded for: Most outstanding senior male gymnast in the country
- Country: United States
- Presented by: College Gymnastics Association
- First award: 1966
- Website: Official website

The Nissen-Emery Award is presented to the most outstanding senior male collegiate gymnast in the United States. The award reflects admirable scholarship, moral characteristics, and sporting success.

== List of winners ==
Year	Winner	University
1966	James Curzi	Michigan State
1967	Steve Cohen	Penn State
1968	Dave Thor	Michigan State
1969	Robert Emery	Penn State
1970	Pete Difurio	Temple
1971	Brent Simmons	Iowa State
1972	Tom Lindner	Southern Illinois
1973	John Crosby	Southern Connecticut State
1974	Steve Hug	Stanford
1975	Jay Whelan	Southern Connecticut State
1976	Gene Whelan	Penn State
1977	Peter Kormann	Southern Connecticut State
1978	Tim LaFleur	Minnesota
1979	Kurt Thomas	Indiana State
1980	Mario McCutcheon	Southern Connecticut State
1981	Bart Conner	Oklahoma
1982	Jim Hartung	Nebraska
1983	Peter Vidmar	UCLA
1984	Roy Palassou	San Jose State
1985	Matt Arnot	New Mexico
1986	Wes Suter	Nebraska
1987	Michael 'Spider' Maxwell	Penn State
1988	Tom Schlesinger	Nebraska
1989	David Zeddies	Illinois
1990	Mike Racanelli	Ohio State
1991	Jarrod Hanks	Oklahoma
1992	Scott Keswick	UCLA
1993	John Roethlisberger	Minnesota
1994	Kip Simons	Ohio State
1995	Josh Stein	Stanford
1996	Darren Elg	Brigham Young
1997	Blaine Wilson	Ohio State
1998	Dan Fink	Oklahoma
1999	Todd Bishop	Oklahoma
2000	Jeff LaVallee	Massachusetts
2001	Jamie Natalie	Ohio State
2002	Justin Toman	Michigan
2003	Daniel Furney	Oklahoma
2004	Dan Gill	Stanford
2005	Guillermo Alvarez	Minnesota
2006	Justin Spring	Illinois
2007	Matt Cohen	Penn State
2008	Jonathan Horton	Oklahoma
2009	Casey Sandy	Penn State
2010	Luke Stannard	Illinois
2011	Steven Legendre	Oklahoma
2012	Paul Ruggeri	Illinois
2013	Eddie Penev	Stanford
2014	Sam Mikulak	Michigan
2015	Ellis Mannon	Minnesota
2016	Jesse Glenn	Army
2017	Akash Modi	Stanford
2018	Sean Melton	Ohio State
2019	Yul Moldauer	Oklahoma
2020	Stephen Nedoroscik	Penn State
2021	Shane Wiskus	Minnesota
2022	Brody Malone	Stanford
2023	Paul Juda	Michigan
2024	Colt Walker	Stanford
2025	Taylor Christopulos	Nebraska
2026	Fred Richard	Michigan

== Total wins by school ==
Rank	School	Total
1	Oklahoma	8
2	Penn State	7
2	Stanford	7
4	Minnesota	5
4	Ohio State	5
6	Illinois	4
6	Michigan	4
6	Nebraska	4
6	Southern Connecticut	4
10	Michigan State	2
10	UCLA	2
12	Army	1
12	BYU	1
12	Indiana State	1
12	Iowa State	1
12	Massachusetts	1
12	New Mexico	1
12	San Jose State	1
12	Southern Illinois	1
12	Temple	1

== See also ==
- AAI Award
