= Club swinging at the Olympics =

Former Olympic sport

Club swinging at the Olympic Games

Overview
- Sport: Artistic gymnastics
- Gender: Men
- Years held: 1904, 1932

Reigning champion
- Men: George Roth (USA)

Club swinging (or Indian clubs) was an artistic gymnastics event held at the Summer Olympics. It was only held twice: 1904 and 1932. In 1932 only four competitors from two nations competed.

== Medalists ==
Games	Gold	Silver	Bronze
1904 St. Louis	Edward Hennig; United States	Emil Voigt; United States	Ralph Wilson; United States
1932 Los Angeles	George Roth; United States	Philip Erenberg; United States	William Kuhlemeier; United States

=== Team medal counts ===
Rank	Nation	Gold	Silver	Bronze	Total
1	United States	2	2	2	6
