= Keshiary =

Village in Paschim Medinipur, West Bengal, India, Asia

- Village
- Location in West Bengal, India Keshiary (India)
- Coordinates: 22°07′23.9″N 87°14′03.5″E
- Country: India
- State: West Bengal
- District: Paschim Medinipur

Population (2011)
  - Total: 7,706

Languages*
  - Official: Bengali, Santali, English
- Time zone: UTC+5:30 (IST)
- PIN: 721133 (Keshiary)
- Telephone/STD code: 03229
- Lok Sabha constituency: Medinipur
- Vidhan Sabha constituency: Keshiary
- Website: paschimmedinipur.gov.in

Keshiary (also spelled as Keshiari) is a village in the Keshiari CD block in the Kharagpur subdivision of the Paschim Medinipur district in the state of West Bengal.

== Etymology ==
According to the Rennell's map of Bengal (1776AD), present days Keshiary was presented as 'Cofsary' or 'Cossary' in the map. One more area just below the 'Cossary' was presented as 'Rani-saray' which is pronounced same today, the name signifies about a Sarai-Khana (Hotel). Similarly Cossary is also 'Co' and 'Ssary' (a hotel sarai-khana). Thus in the word 'Ke-sh-i-ary' the term 'sh-i-ary' (originally Sarai) can be noticed. It signifies prsecence of a sarai in older times in that region.

== History ==
According to Binoy Ghosh, the southern portion of Medinipur district, being adjacent to the Baleswar district of Odisha, had a long-standing cultural interaction with the neighbouring state. Moreover, as the area stands along the path of powerful political forces, it has been facing continual turmoil from the 12-13th century right up to the middle of the 18th century. Whenever local forces gathered some strength, peace reigned for a while, to be overwhelmed again and again by external powers. The Ganga dynasty and others who followed in ruling Odisha, had control over this area for a long time. They extended their limits of their empire to around Mandaran and Saptagram in Hooghly district on one side and up to the Damodar River on the other. In the period around the junction of the Hindu and Muslim periods of rule, the Odisha kings were a powerful force. The Muslims took time to consolidate their rule in Bengal, after their capture of Nadia district in the 13th century, and the independent kings of Odisha stood in the way of the Muslim advance. During the rule of Anangabhima Deva III (1211-1238), his general Vishnu, even ventured into the Rarh region and captured Lucknowur (later known as Rajnagar). Sultan Ghiasuddin Khilji recaptured Lucknowur and pushed back the invading forces. In a way, the turmoil of the period of changeover from Hindu to Muslim rule in Bengal, helped the Odisha kings to retain control over this area. The period of turmoil continued till the 16th century when the Mughals arrived on the scene.

Daud Khan revolted against the Mughals in 1574 and fled from Saptagram to Dinkeshari (Keshiary). He was defeated by Todar Mal at Moghalmari in 1575. Apart from the Pathans and the Mughals, the Marathas also ruled in the area for some time. In the mid-18th century, Alivardi Khan, after a truce with the Marathas, had left Odisha, including the southern part of Medinipur, to them.

There are many places, temples, tanks etc, around Keshiary, that bear the memory of the long rule of the Odisha kings over the region. Perhaps, the most prominent is the Kurumbera Fort. It was built by Kapilendra Deva of the Gajapati Empire in the 15th century, possibly with a Shiva deul. The fort has been used by the Hindu kings, the Pathans and the Moghuls. Around 1691, it was made a Moghul military camp during the reign of Aurangzeb. The Shiva deul was demolished and a mosque was built. There still are (in 1952-53) signs of the foundations of a Hindu temple.

There are clear signs of the pre-eminence of Shaivism and Tantra in the Keshiary region. This was because of the rule of Shashanka, a staunch Shaivite, who ruled long before the Odisha kings and whose empire extended, well beyond the southern areas of Medinipur, up to Ganjam in Odisha.

== Geography ==
Cities and towns in the southern portion of Kharagpur subdivision (including Dantan I & II, Mohanpur, Keshiary, Narayangarh and Sabang CD blocks) of Paschim Medinipur district
CT: census town, R: rural/ urban centre, H: historical/ religious centre
Owing to space constraints in the small map, the actual locations in a larger map may vary slightly

=== Location ===
Keshiary is located at 22.12°N 87.23°E.

=== Area overview ===
Kharagpur subdivision, shown partly in the map alongside, mostly has alluvial soils, except in two CD blocks in the west – Kharagpur I and Keshiary, which mostly have lateritic soils. Around 74% of the total cultivated area is cropped more than once. With a density of population of 787 per km^{2}nearly half of the district’s population resides in this subdivision. 14.33% of the population lives in urban areas and 86.67% lives in the rural areas.

Note: The map alongside presents some of the notable locations in the subdivision. All places marked in the map are linked in the larger full screen map.

== Demographics ==
According to the 2011 Census of India, Keshiary had a total population of 7,706 of which 3,860 (50%) were males and 3,846 (50%) were females. Population in the age range 0–6 years was 721. The total number of literate persons in Keshiary was 5,724 (74.28% of the population over 6 years).

.*For language details see Keshiari#Language and religion

== Civic administration ==
=== CD block HQ ===
The headquarters of Keshiary CD block are located at Keshiary.

=== Police station ===
Keshiary police station has jurisdiction over Keshiari CD block.

== Transport ==
State Highway 5 running from Rupnarayanpur (in Bardhaman district) to Junput (in Purba Medinipur district) passes through Keshiary.

== Education ==
Keshiary Government College (also known as Government General Degree College, Keshiary) was established in 2015. Affiliated to the Vidyasagar University, it offers honours courses in English, Bengali, Santali, History, Political Science, Anthropology, Botany and Zoology and general course in Arts and Science.

== Healthcare ==
Keshiary Rural Hospital, with 30 beds at Keshiary, is the major government medical facility in the Keshiari CD block.
