= Gleyre =

Gleyre is a surname. Notable people with the surname include:

- Charles Gleyre (1806–1874), Swiss artist
- Marcel Gleyre (1910–1996), American gymnast
