= Indian club =

Type of exercise equipment

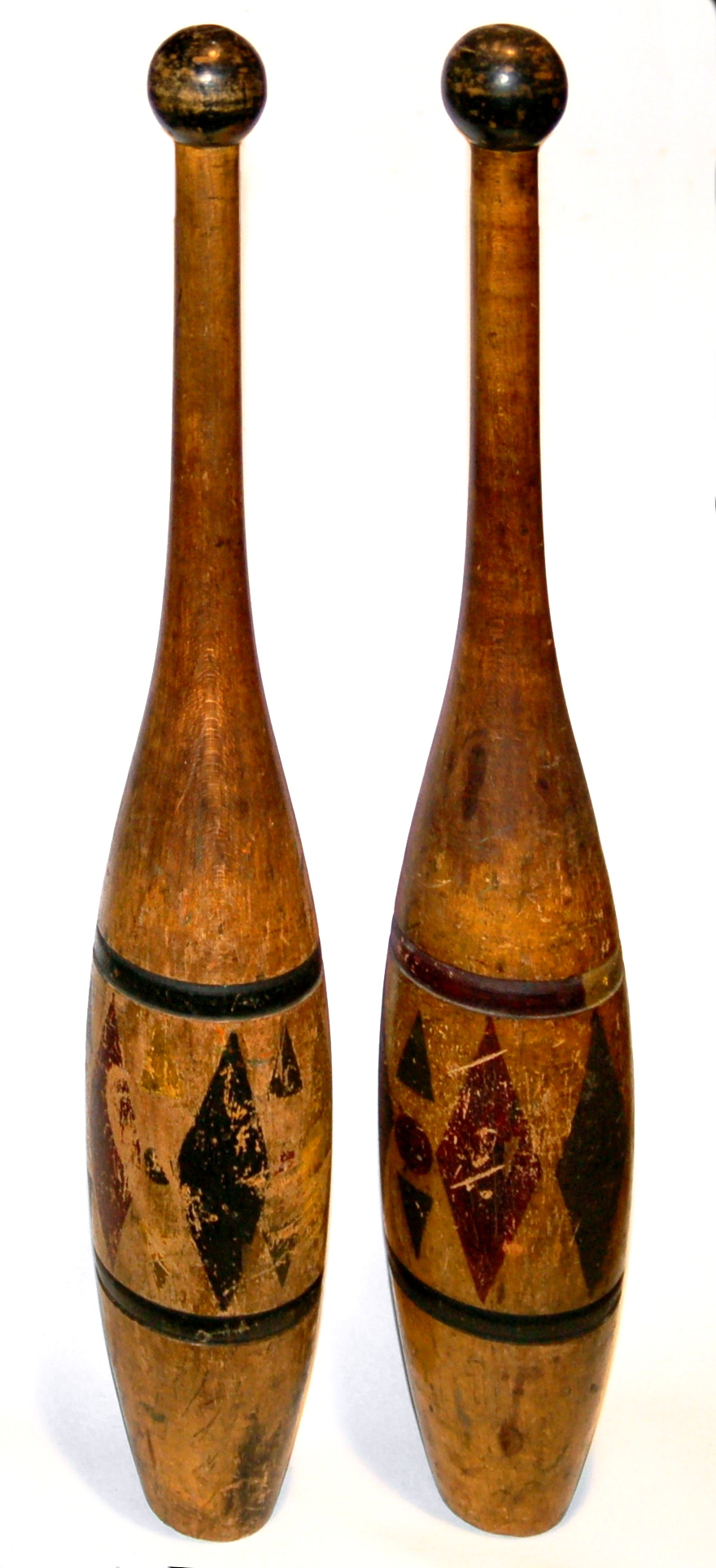
A pair of painted Indian clubs from the late 19th century as used in rhythmic gymnastics

Indian clubs (Sanskrit: मुद्गर, romanized: mudgara), known in Iran as meels (Persian: میل, romanized: mil), are a type of exercise equipment used to present resistance in movement to develop strength and mobility. They consist of juggling pin-shaped wooden clubs of varying sizes and weights, which are swung in certain patterns as part of a strength exercise program. They can range in weight from a few kilograms each to as much as 50 kg. They were used in carefully choreographed routines in which the clubs were swung in unison by a group of exercisers, led by an instructor,‌ the way it is still practiced in Varzesh-e Bastani in Iran and similar to 21st-century aerobics classes. The routines would vary according to the group's ability along with the weights of the clubs being used. When the 19th-century British colonists came across exercising clubs in India, they named them Indian clubs.

== History ==
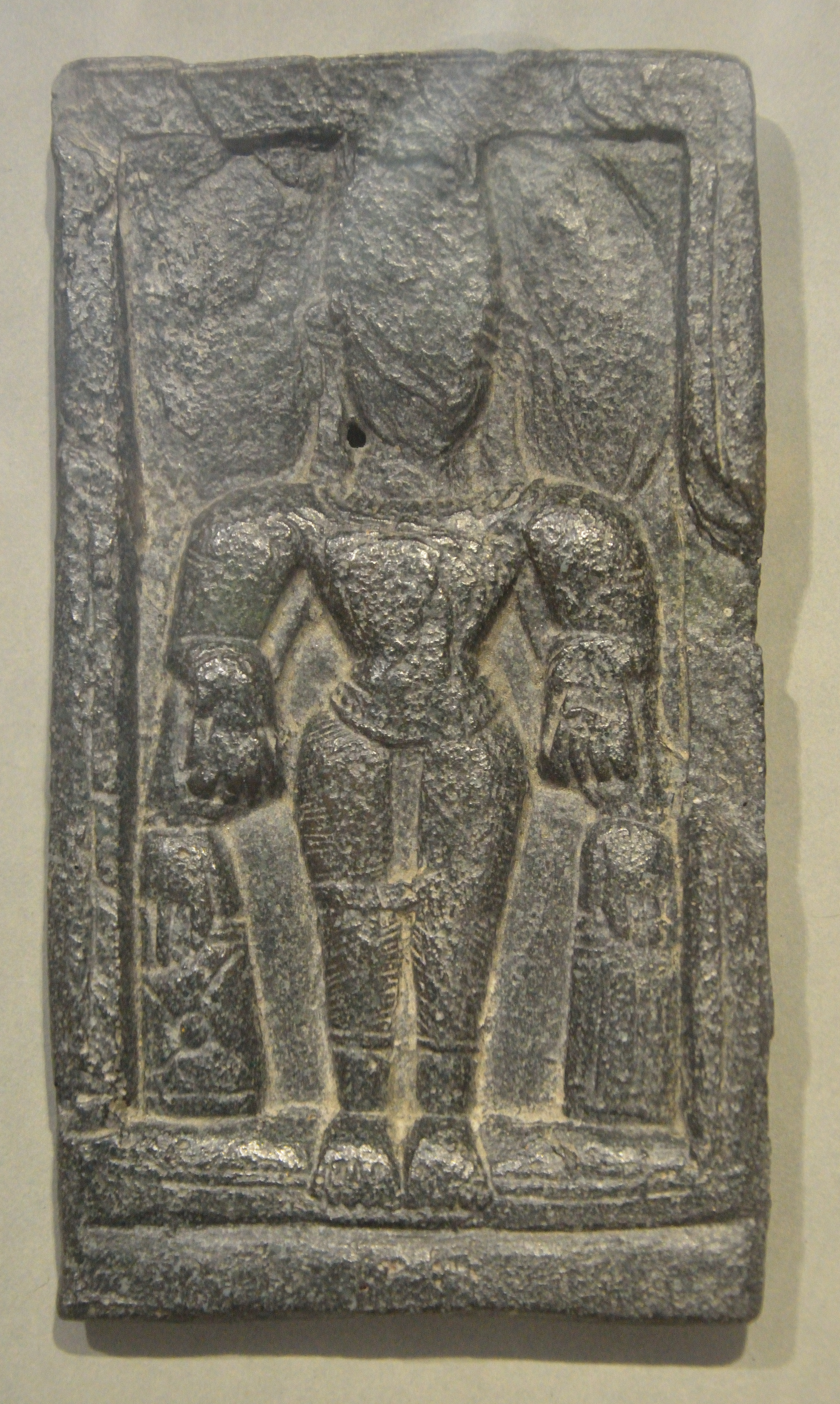
Stone figure using an exercise equipment similar to Indian clubs, 5th–7th century CE found in Moghalmari

Club swinging is believed to have originated among soldiers in India and Persia as a method of improving strength, agility, balance and physical ability.

The gada club is a blunt mace from the Indian subcontinent. Made either of wood or metal, it consists essentially of a spherical head mounted on a shaft, with a spike on the top. The gada is one of the traditional pieces of training equipment in Hindu physical culture, and is common in the akhara of north India. Maces of various weights and heights are used depending on the strength and skill level of the practitioner. For training purposes, one or two wooden gada (mudgar) are swung behind the back in several different ways; this is particularly useful for building grip strength and shoulder endurance. Mudgar are mentioned in the Indian treatise Arthashastra written by Kautilya dated to the 4th century BCE.

In Tamil Nadu, the southern state of India, there exists a cultural practice akin to the club exercises known as Karalakattai. This tradition encompasses 64 distinct types of swings and exercises designed to target various muscles and body parts. Historically, this age-old training equipment was purportedly prevalent in households across Tamilnadu nearly 2000 years ago. Practitioners of Karalakattai suggest its origins trace back to the era of Kumari Kandam, also referred to as Lemuria, a period of historical significance in the region.

Several Mauryan era coins depict club swinging; the Gupta era gold coin also depicts one of its kings performing club swinging with Gada. Gandharan fifth century schist used as wrestler's weight with Gada carved on it indicates that Gada might have been used as a training tool. Manasollasa written in the twelfth century explicitly describes training exercises and club swinging along with wrestling. The thirteenth century text, Malla Purana, discusses Lord Krishna and Balarama's prescriptions regarding wrestlers’ bodies and training methods such as club swinging; the text exhibits that the club swinging has long been a regulated practice. A Rajput painting from 1610 CE shows athletes performing various acrobatics including club swinging while dancing on Raga Desahka. A Mughal painting from 1670 depicts Indian athletes using Indian clubs and performing other exercises such as weightlifting, mallakhamb. In the nineteenth century when the British adopted Indian clubs they were remodelled into lightweight clubs bearing little resemblance to their traditional counterparts. Whereas traditional clubs weighed up to 35 kg (77 lb), those recommended, and adopted by Britain's army, weighed 2 kg (4.4 lb).

While torches and other stick-like objects have been used in juggling for centuries, the modern juggling club was inspired by Indian clubs, which were first repurposed for juggling by DeWitt Cook in the 1800s.

Exceptionally popular during the fitness movement of the late Victorian era, used by military cadets and well-heeled ladies alike, they appeared as a gymnastic event in the 1904 and 1932 Olympics. Gymnasiums were built solely to cater to club exercise groups. During the late 19th and early 20th centuries they became increasingly common in Europe, the British Commonwealth and the United States.

Circa 1913/14 the Bodyguard unit of the British suffragette movement carried Indian clubs as concealed weapons for use against the truncheons of the police.

The popularity of Indian clubs waned in Europe during the 1920s and 1930s as organized sports became more prevalent. Regimented exercise routines, like those requiring Indian clubs, were relegated to professional athletes and the military, who had access to more effective and modern strength training equipment.

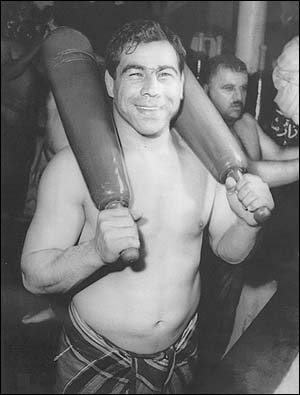
A pair of meels held by Iranian wrestler Gholamreza Takhti

There are physical fitness enthusiasts reviving the usage of Indian Clubs in the early 21st century, citing the aerobic exercise and safety advantages over traditional free weight regimens. There are nostalgic replicas of the original clubs being manufactured, as well as modern engineering updates to the concept, such as the Clubbell.

=== Pahlevāni And Zoorkhaneh Rituals ===
Traditional strength-training tools resembling clubs are historically found in ancient Persia, where they are known as meel or mil (Persian: میل). Their use dates back to at least the Parthian and Sassanian eras (247 BCE – 651 CE), and they remain a central element in the traditional Iranian martial art known as Varzesh-e Pahlavani (ورزش پهلوانی), particularly within the Zurkhaneh (زورخانه). While Persian and Indian training tools may appear similar due to shared Indo-Iranian heritage, they developed independently within their respective cultures. Varzesh-e Pahlavani combines elements of strength training, martial discipline, and spiritual ethics. Notable practitioners include Gholamreza Takhti and Hossein Khosrow Ali Vaziri (The Iron Sheik).

=== Japanese version ===
Chi'ishi, a karate conditioning equipment and its exercise pattern was inspired by the gada and mugdar. The war clubs were also inspired by gada.

== Gallery ==
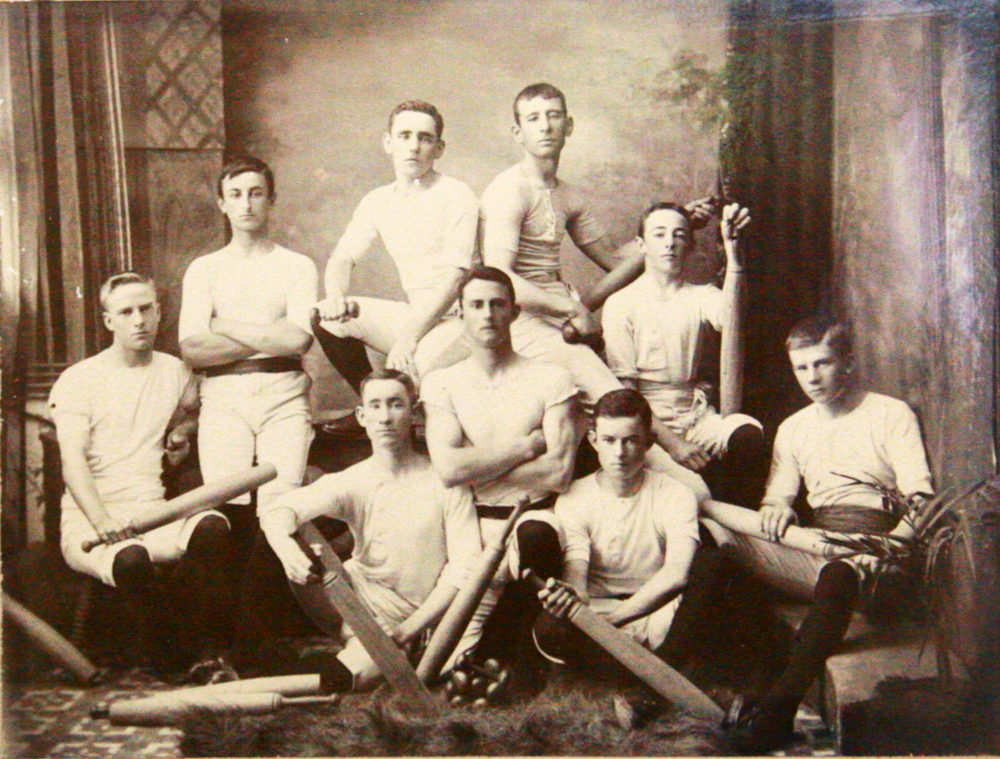
Indian (British Raj) club swinging team, 1890s

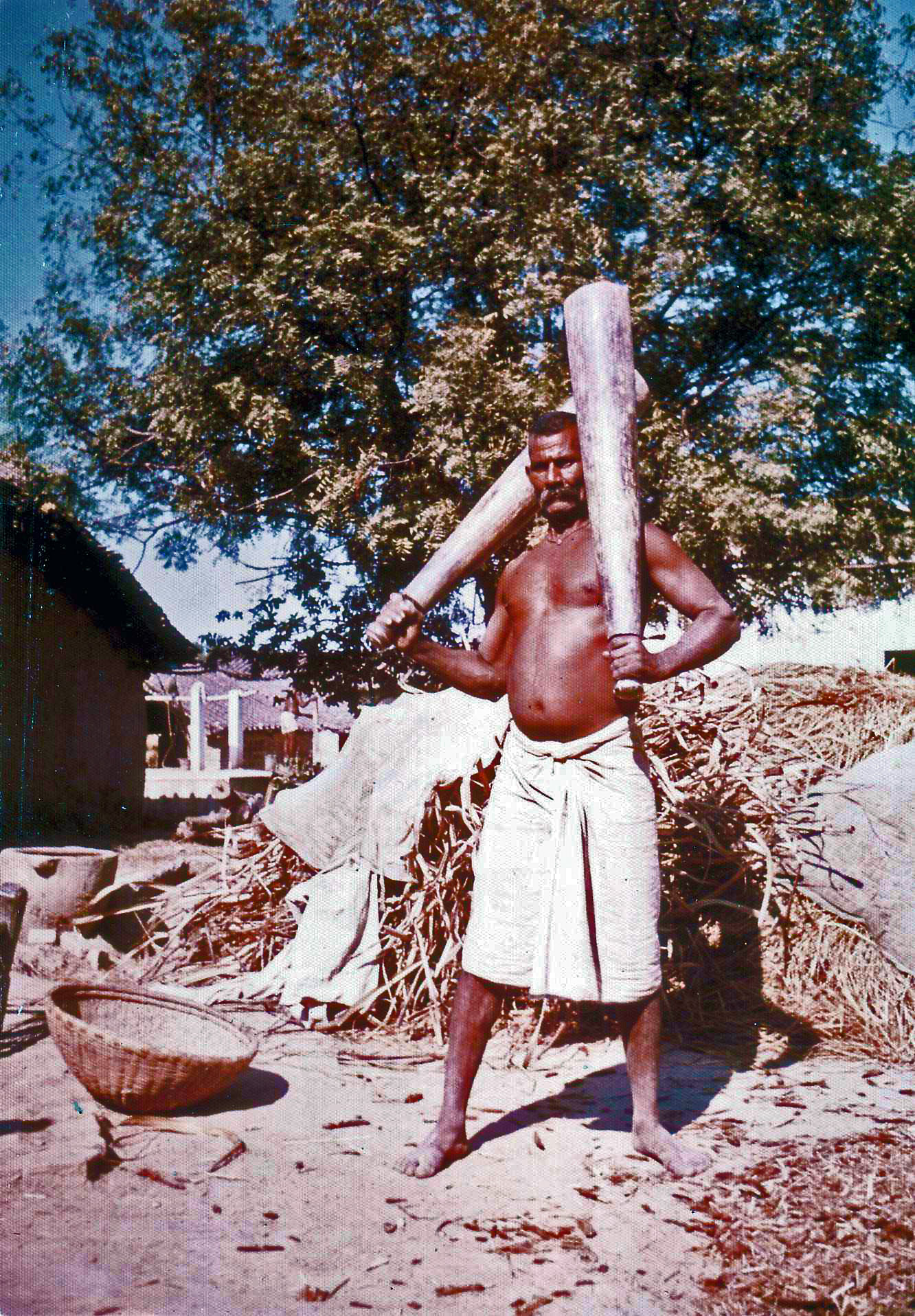
An Indian pehlwan (wrestler) training with clubs c. 1973

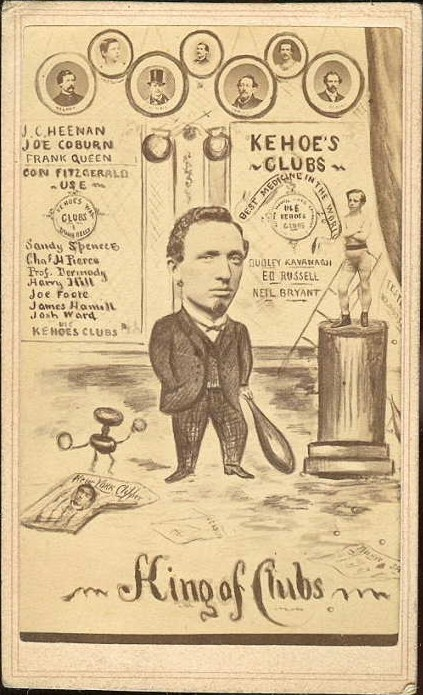
Carte de visite of Sim D. Kehoe, who brought Indian clubs to the United States from England

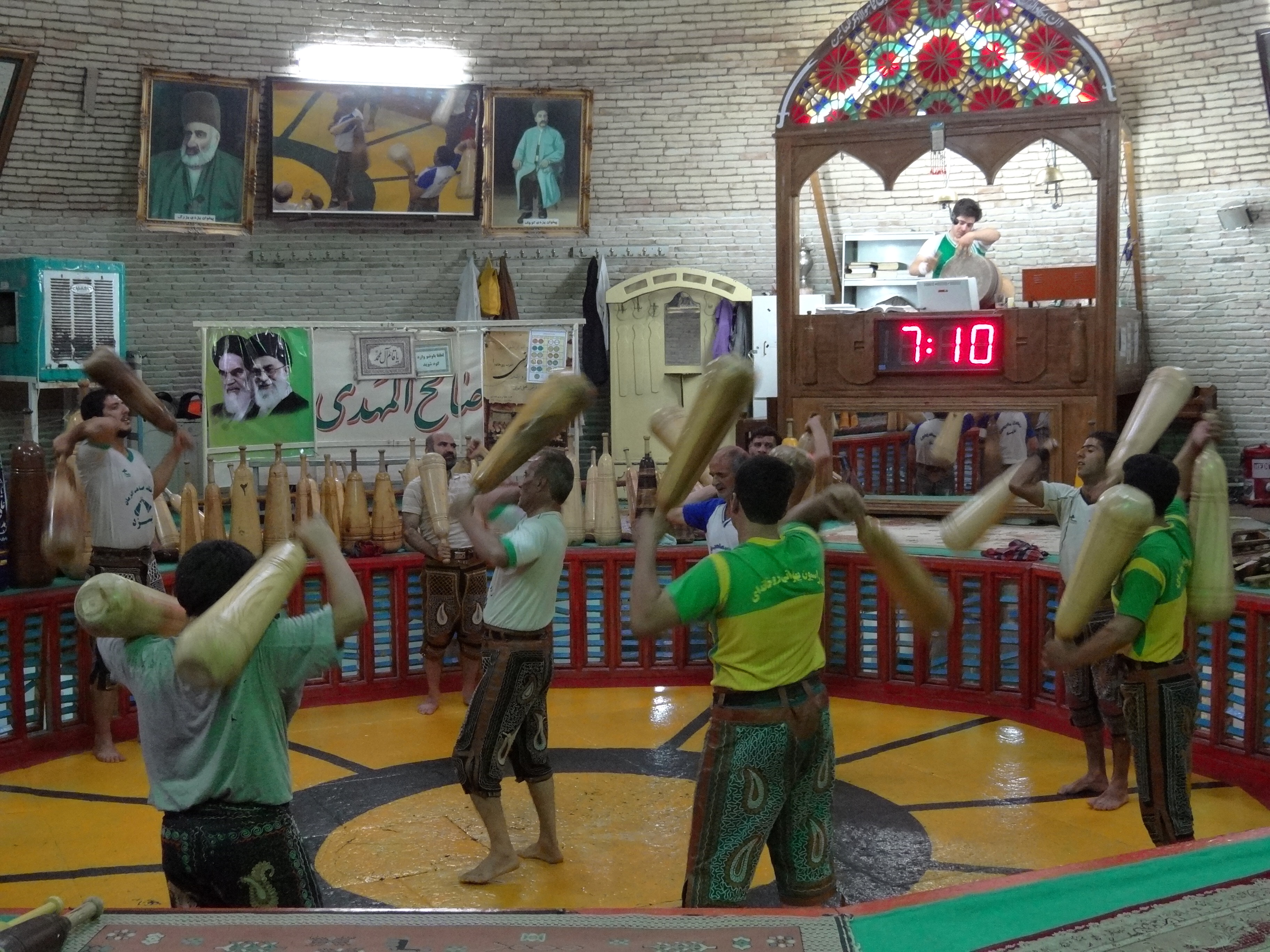
Men working out at Zurkhaneh (House of Strength) in Iran

== See also ==
- Clubs (rhythmic gymnastics)
- Kettlebell
- Newark Athlete
- Toss juggling
- Gymnastics at the 1904 Summer Olympics – Men's club swinging and Gymnastics at the 1932 Summer Olympics – Men's Indian clubs
