= Keshiari =

- Community development block
- Coordinates: 22.133333°N 87.233333°E
- Country: India
- State: West Bengal
- District: Paschim Medinipur

Government
  - Type: Federal democracy

Area
  - Total: 292.09 km^{2} (112.78 sq mi)
- Elevation: 24 m (79 ft)

Population (2011)
  - Total: 149,260
  - Density: 511.01/km^{2} (1,323.5/sq mi)

Languages
  - Official: Bengali, Santali, English
- Time zone: UTC+5:30 (IST)
- PIN: 721133 (Keshiary)
- Telephone/STD code: 03229
- Vehicle registration: WB-34
- Literacy: 76.78%
- Lok Sabha constituency: Medinipur
- Vidhan Sabha constituency: Keshiary
- Website: paschimmedinipur.gov.in

Keshiari (also spelled Keshiary) is a community development block that forms an administrative division in the Kharagpur subdivision of Paschim Medinipur district in the Indian state of West Bengal.

== Geography ==
Keshiari CD block is a largely infertile area. In this block 60% of the cultivated area has lateritic soil and 40% has alluvial soil.

Keshiari is located at 22°08′00″N 87°14′00″E.

Keshiari CD block is bounded by Kharagpur I CD block in the north, Narayangarh CD block in the east, Dantan I and Nayagram CD blocks in the south and Sankrail CD block in the west.

It is located 40 km from Midnapore, the district headquarters.

Keshiari CD block has an area of 292.09 km^{2} (112.78 sq mi). It has one panchayat samity, 9 gram panchayats, 110 gram sansads (village councils), 220 mouzas and 202 inhabited villages. Keshiary police station serves this block. Headquarters of this CD block is at Keshiary.

Keshiari CD block had a forest cover of 2,314 ha (5,720 acres), against a total geographical area of 29,352 ha (72,530 acres) in 2005–06.

Gram panchayats of Keshiari block/ panchayat samiti are: Baghasty, Gaganeswar, Ghritagram, Keshiari, Khajra, Kusumpur, Lalua, Nachipur and Santrapur.

== Demographics ==
=== Population ===
According to the 2011 Census of India, Keshiary CD block had a total population of 149,260, all of which were rural. There were 75,601 (51%) males and 73,659 (49%) females. Population in the age range 0 to 6 years was 16,984. Scheduled Castes numbered 34,260 (22.95%) and Scheduled Tribes numbered 51,128 (34.25%).

As per the 2001 census, Keshiari block had a population of 131,983, out of which 67,298 were males and 64,685 females. Keshiari block registered a population growth of 17.95 per cent during the 1991-2001 decade. Decadal growth for the combined Midnapore district was 14.87 per cent. Decadal growth in West Bengal was 17.45 per cent.

Large villages (with 4,000+ population) in Keshiari CD block are (2011 census figures in brackets): Keshiari (7,706) and Mahi Samura (5,010).

Other villages in Keshiari CD block include (2011 census figures in brackets): Nachhipur (1,458), Santrapur (3,605), Kusumpur (1,174), Gaganeswar (2,575) and Lalua (269).

=== Literacy ===
As per the 2011 census, the total number of literates in Keshiary CD block was 101,557 (76.78% of the population over 6 years) out of which males numbered 56,467 (84.39% of the male population over 6 years) and females numbered 45,090 (68.98% of the female population over 6 years). The gender gap in literacy rates was 15.40%.

See also – List of West Bengal districts ranked by literacy rate

Literacy in CD blocks of
Paschim Medinipur district
Jhargram subdivision
Binpur I – 69.74%
Binpur II – 70.46%
Gopiballavpur I – 65.44%
Gopiballavpur II – 71.40%
Jamboni – 72.63%
Jhargram – 72.23%
Nayagram – 63.70%
Sankrail – 73.35%
Medinipur Sadar subdivision
Garhbeta I – 72.21%
Garhbeta II – 75.87%
Garhbeta III – 73.42%
Keshpur – 77.88%
Midnapore Sadar – 70.48%
Salboni – 74.87%
Ghatal subdivision
Chandrakona I – 78.93%
Chandrakona II – 75.96%
Daspur I – 83.99%
Daspur II – 85.62%
Ghatal – 81.08%
Kharagpur subdivision
Dantan I – 73.53%
Dantan II – 82.45%
Debra – 82.03%
Keshiari – 76.78%
Kharagpur I – 77.06%
Kharagpur II – 76.08%
Mohanpur – 80.51%
Narayangarh – 78.31%
Pingla – 83.57%
Sabang – 86.84%
2011 Census: CD Block Wise

Primary Census Abstract Data

=== Language and religion ===
Religion in Keshiari CD block (2011)
Hinduism	94.11%
Christianity	2.99%
Islam	1.39%
Other (tribal religion)	1.35%
Other or not stated	0.16%

In the 2011 census Hindus numbered 140,467 and formed 94.11% of the population in Keshiari CD block. Christians numbered 4,470 and formed 2.99% of the population. Muslims numbered 2,066 and formed 1.39% of the population. Others numbered 2,257 and formed 1.51% of the population. Others include Addi Bassi, Marang Boro, Santal, Saranath, Sari Dharma, Sarna, Alchchi, Bidin, Sant, Saevdharm, Seran, Saran, Sarin, Kheria, and other religious communities. In 2001, Hindus were 85.91%, Muslims 1.29%, Christians 3.34% and tribal religions 9.35% of the population respectively.

Languages of Keshiari CD block (2011)
1. Bengali (77.4%)
2. Santali (17.3%)
3. Koda (1.91%)
4. Mundari (1.60%)
5. Others (1.79%)

At the time of the 2011 census, 77.41% of the population spoke Bengali, 17.29% Santali, 1.91% Koda and 1.60% Mundari as their first language.

== BPL families ==
In Keshiari CD block 46.89% families were living below poverty line in 2007.

According to the District Human Development Report of Paschim Medinipur: The 29 CD blocks of the district were classified into four categories based on the poverty ratio. Nayagram, Binpur II and Jamboni CD blocks have very high poverty levels (above 60%). Kharagpur I, Kharagpur II, Sankrail, Garhbeta II, Pingla and Mohanpur CD blocks have high levels of poverty (50-60%), Jhargram, Midnapore Sadar, Dantan I, Gopiballavpur II, Binpur I, Dantan II, Keshiari, Chandrakona I, Gopiballavpur I, Chandrakona II, Narayangarh, Keshpur, Ghatal, Sabang, Garhbeta I, Salboni, Debra and Garhbeta III CD blocks have moderate levels of poverty (25-50%) and Daspur II and Daspur I CD blocks have low levels of poverty (below 25%).

== Economy ==
=== Infrastructure ===
201 or 91% of mouzas in Keshiari CD block were electrified by 31 March 2014.

201 mouzas in Keshiari CD block had drinking water facilities in 2013–14. There were 51 fertiliser depots, 3 seed stores and 37 fair price shops in the CD Block.

=== Agriculture ===
Persons engaged in agriculture
in Keshiari CD block
1. Bargadars 7.15 (6.56%)
2. Patta holders 29.48 (27.0%)
3. Small farmers 3.03 (2.78%)
4. Marginal farmers 19.75 (18.1%)
5. Agricultural labourers 49.59 (45.5%)

Although the Bargadari Act of 1950 recognised the rights of bargadars to a higher share of crops from the land that they tilled, it was not implemented fully. Large tracts, beyond the prescribed limit of land ceiling, remained with the rich landlords. From 1977 onwards major land reforms took place in West Bengal. Land in excess of land ceiling was acquired and distributed amongst the peasants. Following land reforms land ownership pattern has undergone transformation. In 2013–14, persons engaged in agriculture in Keshiari CD block could be classified as follows: bargadars 7.15%, patta (document) holders 29.48%, small farmers (possessing land between 1 and 2 hectares) 3.03%, marginal farmers (possessing land up to 1 hectare) 19.75% and agricultural labourers 40.59%.

In 2005-06 the nett cropped area in Keshiari CD block was 20,720 ha (51,200 acres) and the area in which more than one crop was grown was 11,827 ha (29,230 acres).

The extension of irrigation has played a role in growth of the predominantly agricultural economy. In 2013–14, the total area irrigated in Keshiari CD block was 179,300 ha (443,000 acres), out of which 70 ha (170 acres) were irrigated by tank water, 4,700 ha (12,000 acres) by deep tubewells, 13,000 ha (32,000 acres) by shallow tubewells and 150 ha (370 acres) by river lift irrigation.

In 2013–14, Keshiari CD block produced 46,682 tonnes of Aman paddy, the main winter crop, from 23,122 ha (57,140 acres), 3,535 tonnes of Aus paddy (summer crop) from 1,512 ha (3,740 acres), 28,428 tonnes of Boro paddy (spring crop) from 7,666 ha (18,940 acres) and 78,761 tonnes of sugar cane from 357 ha (880 acres). It also produced oilseeds.

=== Banking ===
In 2013–14, Keshiari CD block had offices of 9 commercial banks.

== Transport ==
Keshiari CD block has 2 ferry services and 2 originating/ terminating bus routes. The nearest railway station is 13 km from the CD block headquarters.

Keshiary gained in importance after the construction of the bridge over Subarnarekha River at Bhasara Ghat about 10 kilometers from Keshiary. It enables one to travel to Odisha.

There is a road to Gaganeshwar, where one of the historical durgos (fort) namely Kurumbera Fort is located. Another road connects to Kharagpur railway station about 25 kilometers from Keshiary and 13 kilometers to Belda railway station.

== Education ==
In 2013–14, Keshiari CD block had 123 primary schools with 8,333 students, 19 middle schools with 895 students, 7 high schools with 4,000 students and 10 higher secondary schools with 10,325 students. Keshiari CD block had 505 institutions for special and non-formal education with 12,118 students.

The United Nations Development Programme considers the combined primary and secondary enrolment ratio as the simple indicator of educational achievement of the children in the school going age. The infrastructure available is important. In Keshiari CD block out of the total 122 primary schools in 2008–2009, 51 had pucca buildings, 28 partially pucca, 3 kucha and 40 multiple type.

Keshiary Government College is the general degree college in this block.

== Healthcare ==
In 2014, Keshiari CD block had 1 rural hospital, 3 primary health centres and 2 private nursing homes with total 68 beds and 12 doctors. It had 26 family welfare sub centres and 1 family welfare centre. 6,268 patients were treated indoor and 78,475 patients were treated outdoor in the hospitals, health centres and subcentres of the CD block.

Keshiary Rural Hospital, with 30 beds at Keshiary, is the major government medical facility in the Keshiari CD block. There are primary health centres at: Patharhuri (PO Binandapur (with 6 beds), Khajrabari (PO Khejurkuthi) (with 10 beds) and Ganasarisa (with 2 beds).
