= William Kuhlemeier =

American gymnast

- Full name: William Harmon Kuhlemeier
- Born: January 14, 1908 Seattle, Washington, U.S.
- Died: July 8, 2001 (aged 93) Carlsbad, California, U.S.

Gymnastics career
- Discipline: Men's artistic gymnastics
- Country represented: United States
- Gym: Los Angeles Turnverein Germania, Los Angeles Athletic Club
Medal record
Men's artistic gymnastics
Representing United States
Event	1st	2nd	3rd
Olympic Games	0	0	1
Total	0	0	1
Olympic Games
Bronze medal – third place	1932 Los Angeles	Indian clubs

William Harmon Kuhlemeier (August 14, 1908 – July 8, 2001) was an American gymnast. He was a member of the United States men's national artistic gymnastics team and was the 1932 Olympic bronze medalist in Los Angeles.

== Personal life ==
Kuhlemeier was born in Seattle, Washington, on January 14, 1908, and was likely of German descent, as his name has German origins and he was a Los Angeles' Turnverein Germania Club member. He worked as a manager in the family laundry business.

== 1932 Olympic bronze ==
On July 25, 1932, a tryout meet to determine the American gymnastics team for the Los Angeles Olympics was held at the Los Angeles Athletic Club. Forty-four athletes, many AAU competitors and champions, were scheduled to complete. For Indian Clubs, selections included Kuhlemeier with Roth, and Erenberg, the two other medalists, as well as four other competitors.

At the tryout, Kuhlemeir was associated with the Los Angeles Tuverein Germania Club, which had a long history in Los Angeles catering to a growing German immigrant population and by 1900 featured gymnasts, singers, actors, fencers, marksmen, and costume balls. In the early 1900s and prior, the Indian Club was a common element in German American gymnastic work, an exercise tool first brought to European attention by British soldiers.

Selected for the American Gymnastics team, he competed at the 1932 Summer Olympics in Los Angeles where he received a bronze medal in clubs. The gold medalist was American George Roth, and the silver medalist was American Philip Erenberg, who would become a Los Angeles and Hollywood-based physician specializing in obstetrics and internal medicine. This gave the Americans a clean sweep of the medal competition in the event that year. In the 1932 Olympics and prior, Americans had a limited history with Olympic medals in Gymnastics competitions.

Competing on August 9, 1932, in Los Angeles, he scored 25.9 in the Indian Clubs, placing him third behind Philip Erenberg who scored 26.7. The athletes swung two Indian clubs of .70 kg (1.5 lbs), for a minimum of four minutes. The scoring may have been more subjective than events based on time or distance, as it had somewhat flexible scoring criteria, was an Olympic event that had only been featured once earlier in 1904, had a limited history as a competitive gymnastics event, and included judging on artistry.

According to one source, Kuhlemeier married Nana J. Fly Kuhlemeier in 1936.

Indian clubs was a sport popular in England at one time, and originally common in England's colonies in India. In Indian Club Swinging, there is no juggling, and the club, which looks like a long bowling pin, never leaves the palm of your hand, making the sport more dependent on muscle and endurance than purely on timing, as the clubs each weigh around a pound and a half. The sport was not performed in the Olympics again after 1932.

== Death ==
Kuhlemeier died in Carlsbad, California, South of Los Angeles on July 8, 2001, at the age of 93.
