= Caroline Estes Smith =

American orchestra manager (1877-1970)

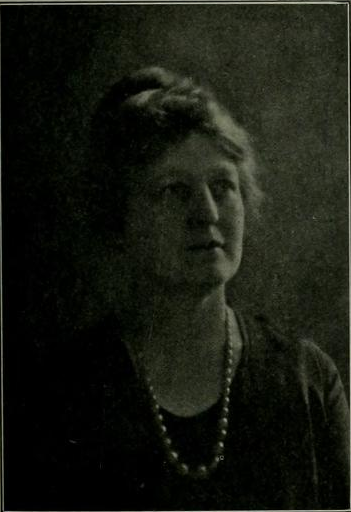
Caroline Estes Smith, c. 1910s-20s, Pacific Coast Music Review

Caroline M. Estes Smith (November 29, 1877 - April 18, 1970) was the first woman to manage the Philharmonic Orchestra of Los Angeles.

== Early life ==
Caroline M. Estes was born on November 29, 1877, in Winn, Maine, the daughter of Willie A. Estes and Mary Graves.

== Career ==
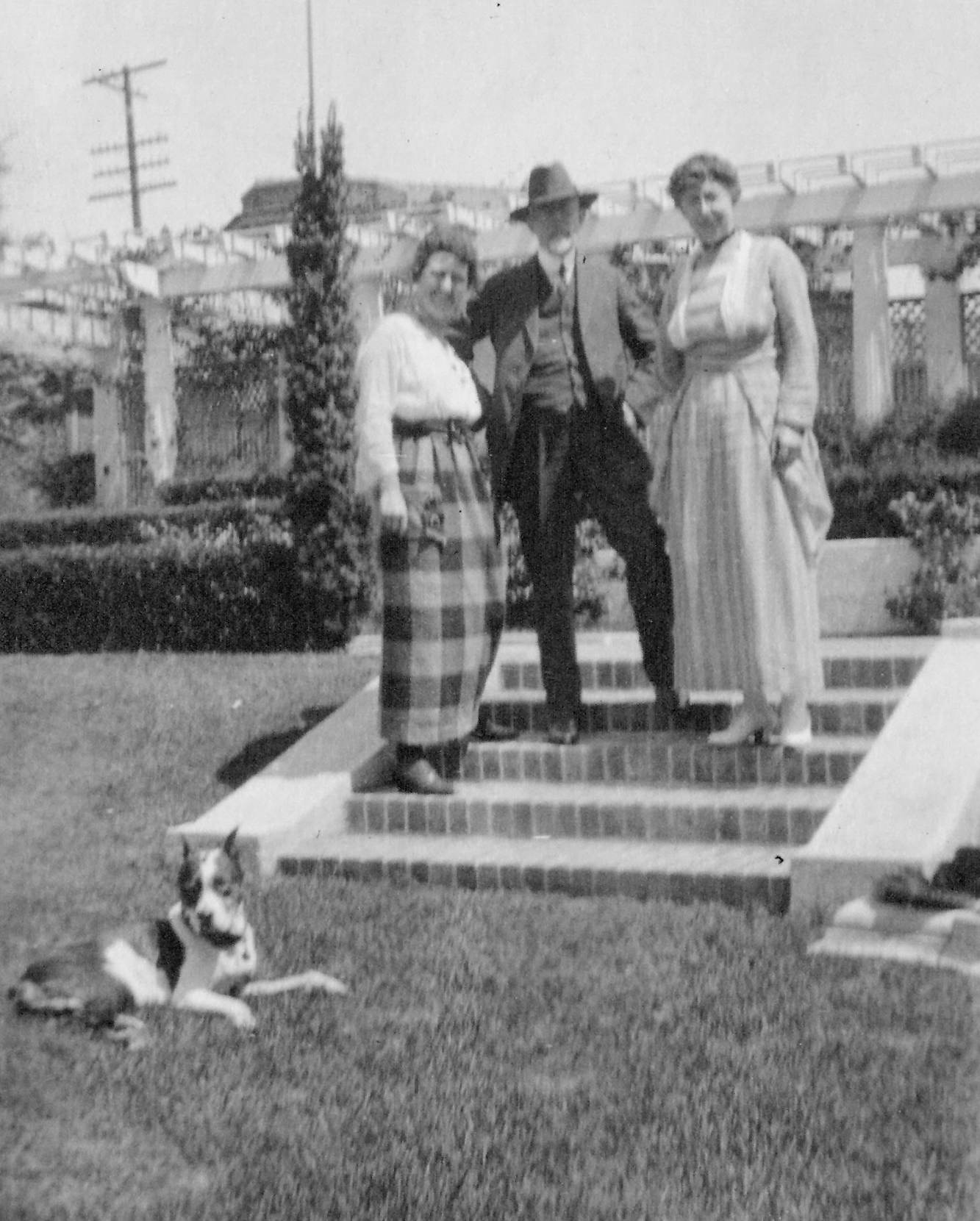
Robert E. Cowan, Cowan's wife Marie, and Caroline Estes-Smith, in the William Andrews Clark Memorial Library's sunken garden

Caroline Estes Smith was William Andrews Clark Jr.’s private secretary until 1922, when she became the first woman to manage the Philharmonic Orchestra of Los Angeles. Even after she retired from her private secretary's job, she and her husband, George Leslie Smith, were frequent guests of Clark at Mowitza Lodge, Salmon Lake State Park, Montana, and lived around the corner from the William Andrews Clark Memorial Library on St. Andrews Place. In 1930 she published The Philharmonic Orchestra of Los Angeles.

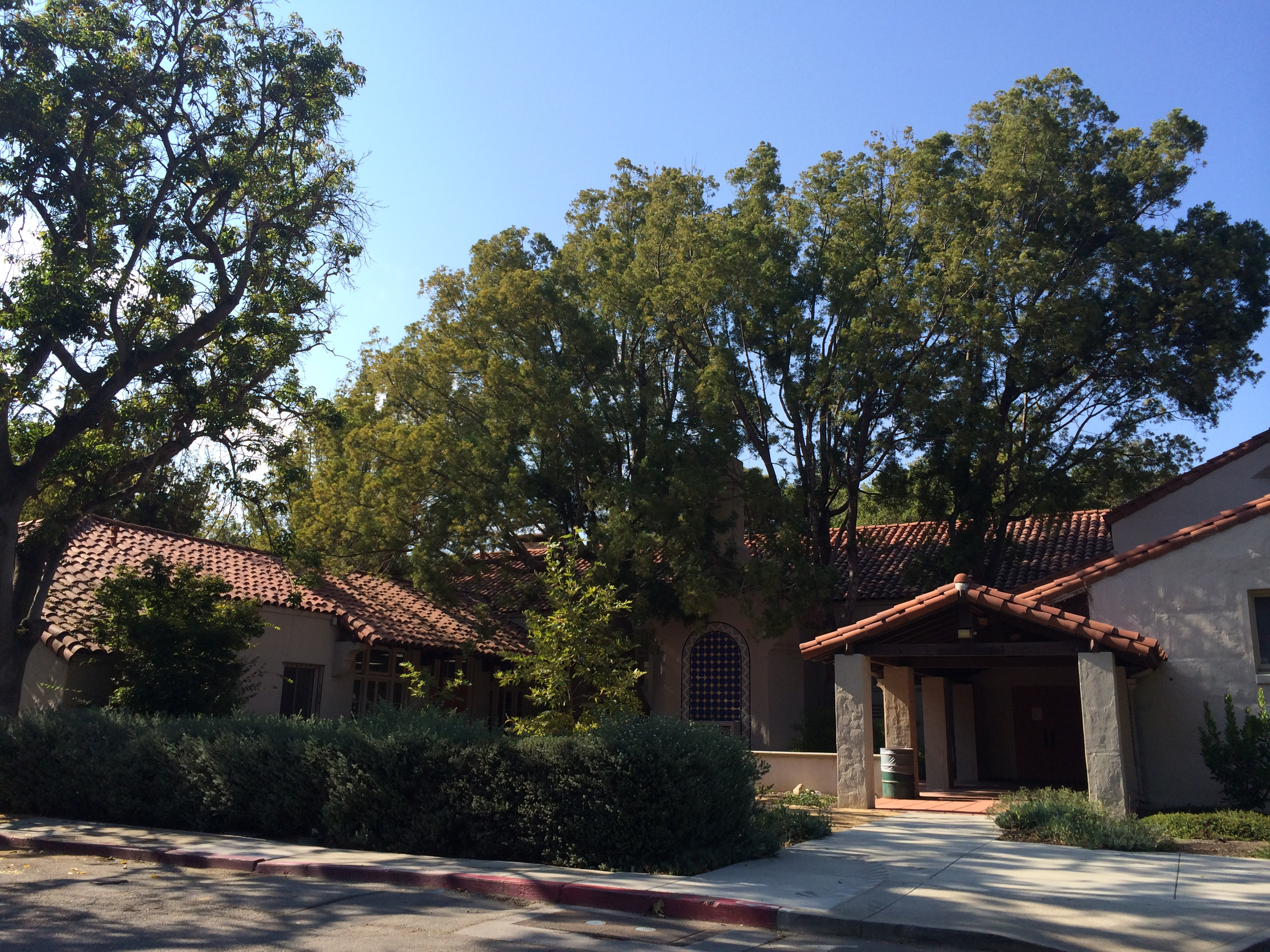
Uplifters Clubhouse

She was a member of the Woman's Athletic Club, Casa del Mar, Southern California Athletic and Country Club, Los Angeles Athletic Club, California Country Club, Uplifters Club, Order of the Eastern Star.

== Personal life ==
On October 2, 1899, Caroline Estes Smith married George Leslie Smith (1874–1943), at Calais, Maine, and had one son, George Leslie Jr. For several years a resident of Boston, Caroline Estes Smith moved to Los Angeles, California, in 1903, and lived at 1237 S. Gramercy Place, Los Angeles, California.

She died on April 18, 1970, and is buried with her husband at Forest Lawn Memorial Park (Glendale).
