= Ed Carmichael =

American artistic gymnast (1907–1960)

- Full name: Daniel Edwin Carmichael
- Born: January 2, 1907 Los Angeles, California, U.S.
- Died: August 3, 1960 (aged 53) Gardena, California, U.S.

Gymnastics career
- Discipline: Men's artistic gymnastics
- Country represented: United States
- Gym: Los Angeles Athletic Club
Medal record
Men's artistic gymnastics
Representing United States
Event	1st	2nd	3rd
Olympic Games	0	0	1
Total	0	0	1
Olympic Games
Bronze medal – third place	1932 Los Angeles	Vault

Daniel Edwin Carmichael (January 2, 1907 – August 3, 1960) was an American artistic gymnast. He was a member of the United States men's national artistic gymnastics team and competed in the 1932 Summer Olympics. In 1932 he won the bronze medal in the vault competition.

As a gymnast, Carmichael was a member of the Los Angeles Athletic Club.

He lived in Gardena, California and was a teacher at Los Angeles City College for 30 years.
