= Los Angeles Athletic Club =

Privately owned athletic club and social club in Los Angeles, California, US

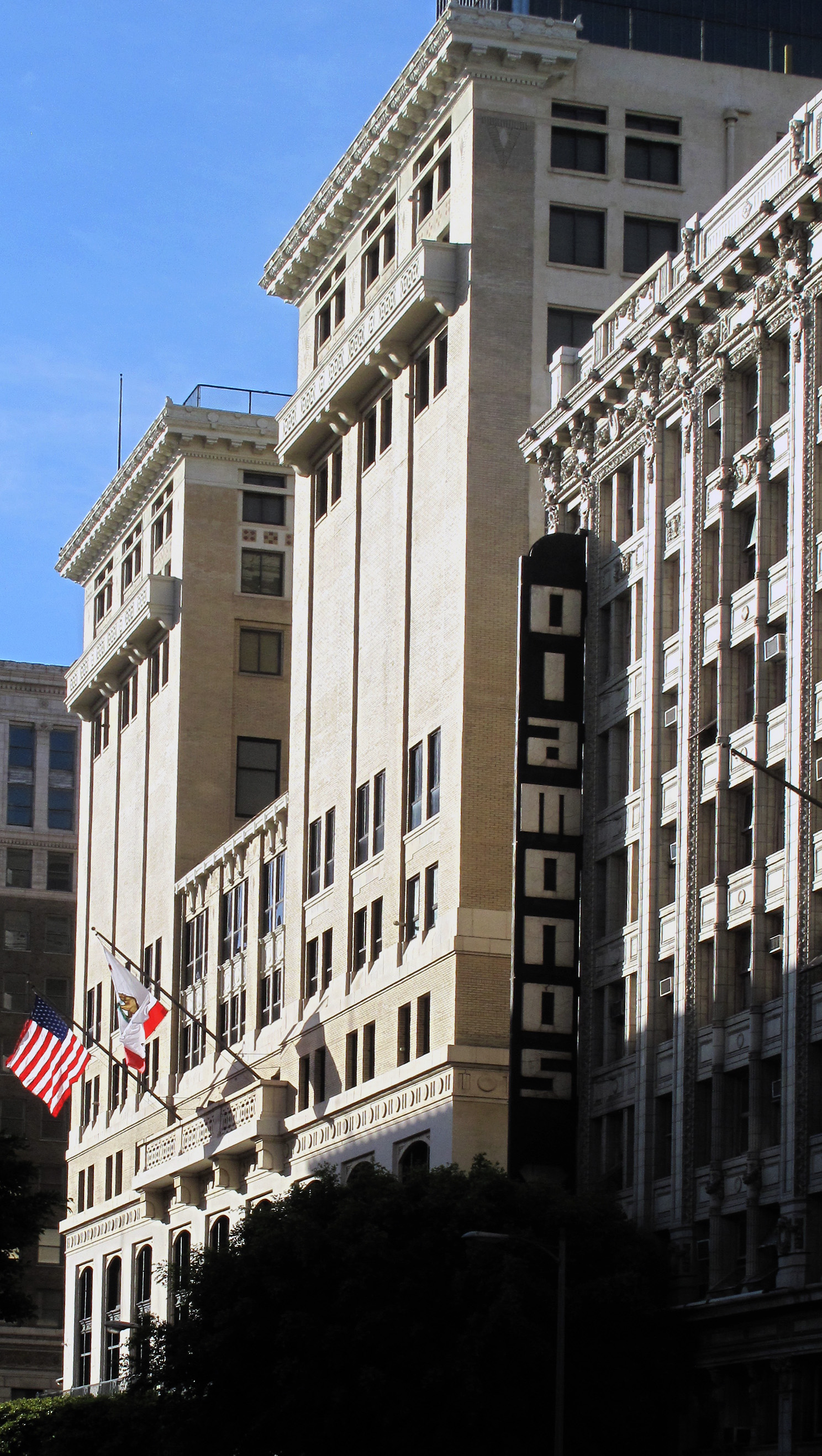
- LAAC Building, on 7th Street in Downtown Los Angeles
- Genre: Athletic club Social club
- Founded: September 8, 1880
- Headquarters: 431 West Seventh Street; Los Angeles, CA 90014
- Website: laac.com

Los Angeles Historic-Cultural Monument
- Designated: September 16, 1970

Los Angeles Athletic Club (LAAC) is a privately owned athletic club, social club and hotel in Los Angeles, California, United States. Established in 1880, the club today is best known for its John R. Wooden Award presented to the outstanding men's and women's college basketball player of each year.

== History ==
=== Establishment ===
The Los Angeles Athletic Club (LAAC) was founded on September 8, 1880. By the end of its first month of existence the fledgling club counted 60 enlisted members and was able to rent its first facility, two halls located in Stearns Hall on Los Angeles Street in downtown Los Angeles. A 19th Century history indicates that the club had the dual purposes of "providing its members with the means of physical development" along with "the advantages of a gentlemen's club".

Reading Room of the Los Angeles Athletic Club as it appeared in the middle 1890s

The club relocated for the first time in 1881, moving to more commodious accommodations in the Downey Block, before moving again a few years later to a still-larger home in the Stowell Block. A fire in 1893 required moving to temporary quarters in the Workman Block, next door to the previous Stowell Block location. Membership in this latter location soon topped the 400 mark, prompting the construction of the club's own permanent building, a four-story structure with a cavernous gymnasium located on an enlarged third floor. It was located on the east side of Spring Street between 5th and 6th, architects were McCarthy & Mendel.

The club provided a venue for gymnastics, athletic training, and team sports, including organization of a civic football team which played the inaugural intercity match with San Francisco in January 1892. During its first two decades of existence the club also established an outdoors athletic park, which included a running track and path for bicycling, a baseball diamond, tennis courts, and facilities for croquet. It also provided rooms designed for socialization, including an expansive reading room, as well as designated areas for billiards and cards.

=== 1912 relocation ===
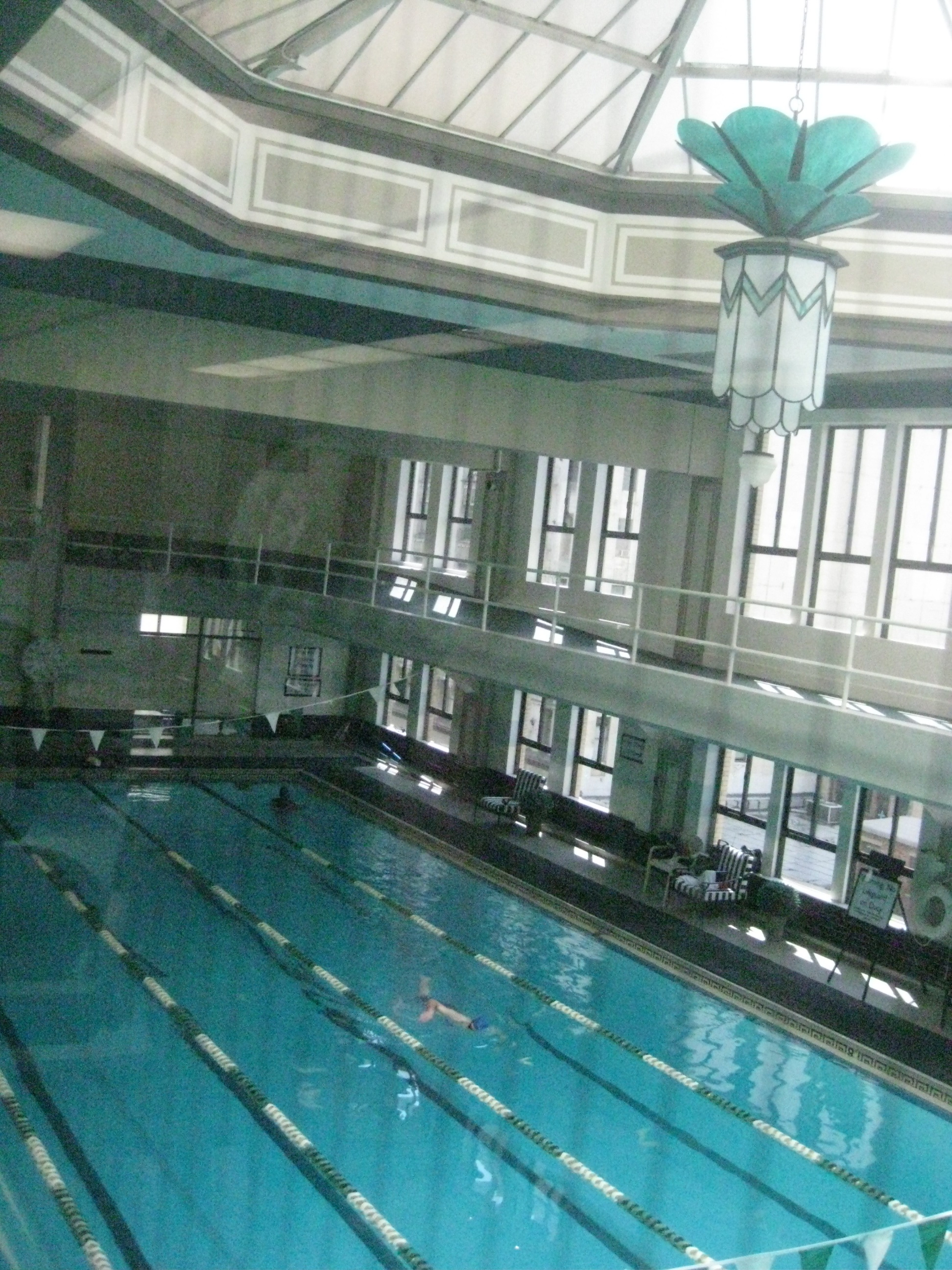
The club's pool

In 1912 it moved into its own new Los Angeles Athletic Club Building at 431 West Seventh Street in Downtown Los Angeles. The twelve-story Beaux-Arts style clubhouse was designed for the LAAC by John Parkinson and George Bergstrom, and is a Los Angeles Historic-Cultural Monument. The building was notable for being the first in Southern California to have an interior swimming pool built on an upper floor.

Due to its position in the growth and development of Los Angeles, the LAAC had significant success during its first 60 years, with membership reflecting its position in Los Angeles society and early Hollywood culture. During its heyday, the LAAC founded a number of other institutions, including the California Yacht Club (1922) and Riviera Country Club (1926). They are now separate entities.

The club faced significant financial burdens due to World War II and the subsequent growth of suburbs.

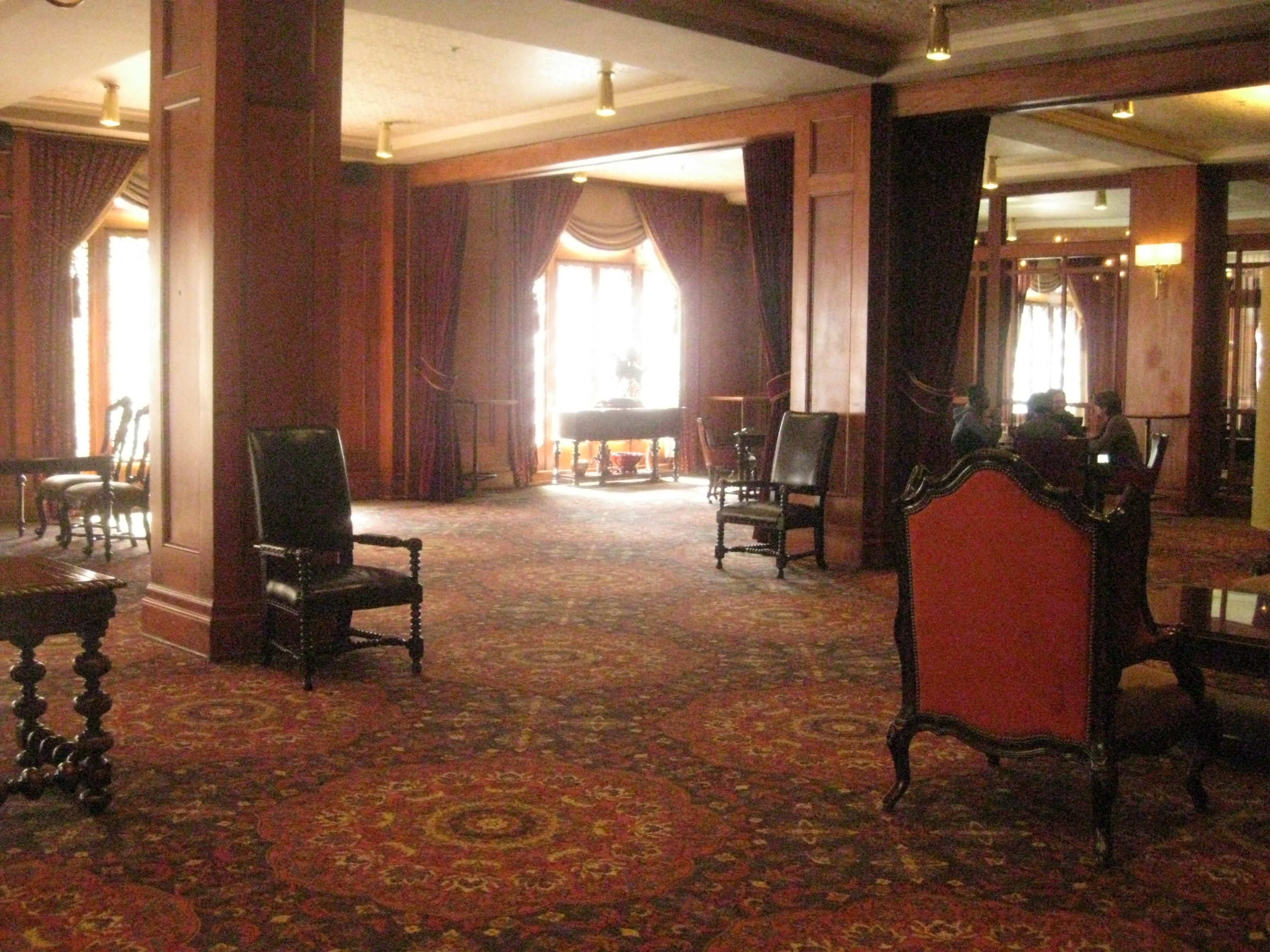
One of the club's lounges.

Athletes from the LAAC have earned numerous medals in the Summer Olympics, with a particularly high number during the 1932 Los Angeles Olympiad. The total Olympic medal tally for the LAAC is 97 medals, including 47 gold.

== Notable members ==
- Arthur Alber, Los Angeles City Council member, 1927–29
- L. Frank Baum
- Glenn Berry, Olympic gymnast
- Richard Bishop, Olympic gymnast
- Dallas Bixler, gymnast and Olympic gold medalist
- Ed Carmichael, gymnast and Olympic bronze medalist
- Chase Dodd, water polo and Olympic bronze medalist, 2xNCAA champion
- Ryder Dodd, water polo and Olympic bronze medalist, 2xNCAA champion, 2xNCAA player of the year
- Adrian Weinberg, water polo and Olympic bronze medalist, 3xNCAA Champion
- Charlie Chaplin, Actor and filmmaker, was a resident from 1914-1918 and 1919-1920.
- Lillian Copeland (1904–1964), Olympic discus champion; set world records in discus, javelin, and shot put
- Reginaldo Francisco del Valle, California State Senator who was instrumental in forming UCLA. California Water Commissioner responsible for bringing water from the Sierras to the city. His wife Helen co-owned the Los Angeles Times. Del Valle was an Attorney.
- George P. Cronk, Los Angeles City Council member, 1945–52
- Vesey Alfred Davoren was the founder and commodore of the Topanga Yacht Club, and was given the sobriquet of "Captain."
- Edward L. Doheny
- Mayor Fred Eaton
- Philip "Phil" Erenberg (1909–1992), gymnast and Olympic silver medalist
- Caroline Estes Smith
- Douglas Fairbanks Jr.
- Robert Frederick Foster
- Louis F. Gottschalk
- A. E. Henning, Los Angeles City Council member, 1929–33
- Henry Huntington
- Duke Kahanamoku, member of LAAC swimming and water polo teams, also club's lifeguard
- Georgia Thatcher Kemp (November 22, 1868 – March 9, 1945)
- Paul Krempel, two-time Olympian in gymnastics
- Harold Lloyd
- Parry O'Brien, Olympic shot put champion
- Colonel Harrison Otis
- Mary Pickford
- George Roth, Olympic Indian clubs gold medalist
- Moses Sherman
- William Desmond Taylor, movie director
- Rudolph Valentino
- Johnny Weissmuller
- Senator Stephen White
- Esther Williams

== See also ==
- List of American gentlemen's clubs
- List of Los Angeles Historic-Cultural Monuments in Downtown Los Angeles
