= Ralph Wilson (gymnast) =

American gymnast (1880–1930)

Olympic medal record

Men's Gymnastics
| Bronze medal – third place | 1904 St Louis | Club swinging |

Ralph Charles Wilson (June 24, 1880 – February 14, 1930) was an American gymnast who competed in the 1904 Summer Olympics. In 1904 he won the bronze medal in the club swinging event.
