= Gymnastics at the 1932 Summer Olympics – Men's Indian clubs =

The men's Indian clubs event was part of the gymnastics programme at the 1932 Summer Olympics at Los Angeles. It was contested for the only time at the Olympics. The 1904 Summer Olympics saw a club swinging event. The competition was held on Tuesday, August 9, 1932. Four gymnasts from two nations competed.

== Medalists ==
Gold	Silver	Bronze
George Roth; United States	Philip Erenberg; United States	William Kuhlemeier; United States

== Results ==
Place	Gymnast	Total
1	George Roth (USA)	26.9
2	Philip Erenberg (USA)	26.7
3	William Kuhlemeier (USA)	25.9
4	Francisco José Álvarez (MEX)	25.4

== See also ==
- Gymnastics at the 1904 Summer Olympics – Men's club swinging
- Indian club
