= George Roth =

American gymnast

- Roth in Olympic clothing, c. 1932

Personal information
- Full name: George Helm Roth
- Born: April 25, 1911 Los Angeles, California, U.S.
- Died: October 31, 1997 (aged 86) Studio City, California, U.S.

Gymnastics career
- Discipline: Men's artistic gymnastics
- Country represented: United States
- Gym: Los Angeles Athletic Club
Medal record
Men's artistic gymnastics
Representing United States
| Event | 1st | 2nd | 3rd |
|---|---|---|---|
| Olympic Games | 1 | 0 | 0 |
| Total | 1 | 0 | 0 |
Olympic Games
| Gold medal – first place | 1932 Los Angeles | Indian clubs |

George Helm Roth (April 25, 1911 – October 31, 1997) was an American gymnast and Olympic champion who competed at the 1932 Summer Olympics in Los Angeles. He was a member of the United States men's national artistic gymnastics team and won a gold medal in club swinging, or Indian Clubs as they were often known. He later became a petroleum geologist who in 1954 founded the petroleum consulting company George H. Roth and Associates in Hollywood, California. Managing the company for nearly thirty years, he and his associates helped discover many new California oil fields.

== Early life ==
George was a third-generation Californian and the second son of George and Inez Roth. His father was a mining engineer and his mother had a long career as a prospector which influenced his early interest in rocks and minerals and his choice of careers. He graduated from Hollywood High School around 1929, where he excelled in athletics and competed at a high level in Gymnastics. He was a member of the Los Angeles Athletic Club. According to an account by his son Jim, Roth dated his wife Beatrice in High School, and married her after graduation around 1930, beginning a long marital relationship.

He soon began studying Geology at the University of California Berkeley and moved there with his wife, but he was forced to drop out after a year and a half when his studies were interrupted by the demands of marriage and the Great Depression. He moved his family back to the Los Angeles area.

== 1932 Olympic gold ==
Likely training full time for Olympic competition, Roth was unemployed when the 1932 games commenced, and he would take food from the Olympic Village back to his wife and baby daughter in East Hollywood. Not long after receiving his gold medal on August 9, 1932, in front of 60,000 spectators, Roth walked out of the Los Angeles stadium and hitchhiked home.

Roth was judged in the competition with a score of 26.9 out of a possible 30, though the scoring was more flexible than in events based on speed or distance. It included judging on artistry, and lacked the Olympic history to evolve fully objective scoring criteria, as it had only been featured once earlier in Olympic competition, in 1904.

The 1932 silver medalist in Indian clubs, Philip Erenberg, was another Los Angeles native and member of the Los Angeles Athletic Club who would become a local physician. Erenberg had likely met George previously through their common membership in the LA Athletic Club. The bronze medalist was American William Kuhlemeier, giving the Americans a clean sweep of the medal competition in the event that year. Making their sweep of the metals more memorable, Americans had a limited history of winning Olympic medals in Gymnastics competitions in 1932 and in most of the prior Olympic years.

Indian clubs was a sport popular in England at one time, and originally common in England's colonies in India. In Indian club swinging, there is no juggling and the club, which looks like a long bowling pin, never leaves the palm of your hand, making the sport more dependent on muscle and endurance than purely on timing, as the clubs each weigh around a pound and a half. The sport was not performed in the Olympics again after 1932.

== Education, 1934-42 ==
George graduated Magna Cum Laude with a Bachelors of Science from the University of Southern California in June 1942 while working full-time for Shell Oil and living on West 65th Street in Long Beach. Completing his degree in Geology and Petroleum Engineering, it took him around eight years of attending night school to complete his Bachelors which he began around 1934, as he worked full time during most of his studies at University of Southern California in Los Angeles.

== Shell Oil, 1935-48 ==
He eventually found a job with the Work Projects Administration as a part of Roosevelt’s “New Deal” in the early 1930's and was later hired by the Long Beach Office of Shell Oil as a geological draftsman in 1935. In the thirties while studying at USC, Shell eventually promoted him to Chief draftsman. When Shell promoted Roth to Scout/Landsman, around 1942, he was transferred from coastal Long Beach to coastal Ventura, California, a distance of roughly ninety-five miles up the Northern Coast of California, and Roth again relocated his family.

After completing his Geology degree in 1942, and completing his relatively short assignment as a Scout/Landsman of a few years in Ventura, Shell promoted him to Geologist in 1944 and he worked and apparently moved his family to the Bakersfield Shell office, an inland location over a hundred miles North of coastal Ventura, where he would remain through around 1948. According to his L.A. Times obituary, the Roths lived in the oil areas of Long Beach, Ventura, and Bakersfield, eventually moving to Hollywood when George left Shell Oil.

== Consulting geologist, 1948-80 ==
After moving to Hollywood around 1948, George worked for the Petroleum consulting firm of William Ross Cabeen and Associates for around four years. Cabeen was a relatively new firm, founded after the war by William Ross Cabeen, a UCLA geology and 1939 Cal Tech petroleum engineering graduate. Roth's start in consulting with a relatively new and expanding firm gave him the type of experience he would need when he started his own firm four years later.

He set up his successful consulting firm George H. Roth and Associates in Hollywood in 1952, meeting the initial challenge of obtaining funding and new clients by working long hours. Working in private practice for thirty years, he and his associates discovered over ten new oil and gas fields throughout California. His firm was instrumental in discovering portions of the Cascade field, roughly twenty-five miles Northeast of Los Angeles and overlooking the San Fernando Valley. In late October 1952, George presented the paper, "Castaic Hills Oil Field", a field roughly thirty-eight miles northwest of Los Angeles, for the Pacific Section of the American Association of Petroleum Geologists at the Statler Hotel in Los Angeles. Other California areas the firm helped discover included the Santa Clara Avenue, Brentwood, Los Medanos, Rice Creek, Livermore, West Edison Deep, Millar Winters, Zamora, and Freeport oil and gas fields.

== Retirement ==
George retired in 1980, after selling his petroleum consulting company to Dow/Apache. After retirement, he returned to the office occasionally to look after his royalty interests. He died on October 31, 1997, at the age of 86. He was survived by his wife Beatrice to whom he was married 67 years, two daughters, a son, grandchildren and great-grandchildren. He was affiliated with the American Association of Petroleum Geologists. Apparently following a three-generation family tradition of mining, George's son would also work as a petroleum engineer.
