= Marcel Gleyre =

American gymnast (1910–1996)

- Full name: Marcel Napoleon Gleyre
- Born: June 17, 1910 Sainte-Croix, Switzerland
- Died: March 22, 1996 (aged 85) Madison, New Jersey, U.S.

Gymnastics career
- Discipline: Men's artistic gymnastics
- Country represented: United States
- Gym: Swiss Turnverein

Marcel Napoleon Gleyre (June 17, 1910 – March 22, 1996) was an American gymnast. He was a member of the United States men's national artistic gymnastics team and competed in the men's vault event at the 1932 Summer Olympics. Gleyre was born in Switzerland, though his place of birth is variously listed as being Sainte-Croix or Neuchâtel.

As a gymnast, Gleyre was a member of Swiss Turnverein in Union City, New Jersey.

Gleyre graduated from Seton Hall University earning an undergraduate degree and a master's degree in 1935. He later was a teacher at Union Hill High School and coached their gymnastics team. He served with the United States Navy during World War II. He was the long-time owner of an embroidery company in West New York, New Jersey. He lived in Wyckoff, New Jersey and moved to Madison, New Jersey, where he died at his home there at the age of 85.
