= Philip Erenberg =

American gymnast (1909–1992)

- Full name: Philip Richard Erenberg
- Born: March 16, 1909 Loyew, Russian Empire
- Died: February 2, 1992 (aged 82) West Hollywood, California, U.S.

Gymnastics career
- Discipline: Men's artistic gymnastics
- Country represented: United States
- Gym: Los Angeles Athletic Club
Medal record
Men's artistic gymnastics
Representing United States
Event	1st	2nd	3rd
Olympic Games	0	1	0
Total	0	1	0
Olympic Games
Silver medal – second place	1932 Los Angeles	Indian clubs

Philip Richard Erenberg (March 16, 1909 – February 2, 1992) was an American gymnast. He was a member of the United States men's national artistic gymnastics team and competed at the 1932 Summer Olympics and won the silver medal for Indian clubs.

== Personal life ==
Born in Belarus in the Russian Empire, Erenberg was Jewish. He arrived in the United States around 1912 at the age of three with his family. He had one brother and one sister. Initially, his family lived in the Humboldt Park neighborhood of Chicago, Illinois, where his father was a worker and foreman at the Florsheim Shoe Company. In 1923 they moved to Los Angeles, where he attended Roosevelt High School, where he participated in sports and served as a sportswriter for the school newspaper. He was introduced to gymnastics around the age of 18, and as Roosevelt High was a new school with a new gymnasium and had acquired only limited equipment, he took up the Indian Clubs as they were inexpensive and easy to acquire.

Erenberg noted that Los Angeles became a growth center for gymnastics and Roosevelt High produced several Olympic athletes including track star Lillian Copeland, divers Johnny and Michael Galitzen, and basketball player Sam Balter who won a gold in the 1936 Olympics. In Indian Club Swinging, there is no juggling and the club never leaves the palm of your hand, making the sport more dependent on muscle and endurance then purely on timing, as the clubs each weigh around a pound and a half.

He attended UCLA as an undergraduate. Erenberg received a medical degree from the University of California, Irvine School of Medicine in 1934. He practiced obstetrics and then internal medicine in the Los Angeles area with a practice in Hollywood for a period, completing over a fifty-year career in his lifetime. He lived for a period on Laurel Pass near Laurel Canyon, and Hollywood. He married Doris Weitzman, who attended UCLA, in the fall of 1937 in Hollywood, and was later married to Patricia Zidell. The great majority of his medical career was in private practice at the same Los Angeles office.

== Olympic silver medal ==
Erenberg was given a membership in and competed for the Los Angeles Athletic Club.

Erenberg won the 1932 National American Athletic Union (AAU) Championship in Indian Clubs. He heard about the Olympic selection for Indian Clubs through the Los Angeles Athletic Club, but with few Indian Club Swingers, Erenberg did not recall that he was required to compete for the team. A selection process of some form did occur in Los Angeles around July 25, 1932, where Erenberg was placed first in club swinging.

He competed at the 1932 Summer Olympics in Los Angeles, where he received a silver medal in gymnastics in clubs. The gold medalist was American George Roth, and the bronze medalist was American William Kuhlemeier, giving the Americans a clean sweep of the medal competition in the event that year. In the 1932 Olympics and prior, Americans had a limited history with Olympic medals in Gymnastics competitions. He received his invitation to the Olympics during the years he was enrolled at Medical School, eventually graduating from UC Irvine in 1934.

Erenberg and his wife Patricia Zidell had a son and a daughter. He died in Los Angeles in Los Angeles County on February 2, 1992.

In 2010 Erenberg was inducted into the Southern California Jewish Sports Hall of Fame.

== See also ==
- List of select Jewish gymnasts
