= Kurumbera Fort =

Building in India

- Keshiari, West Bengal, India
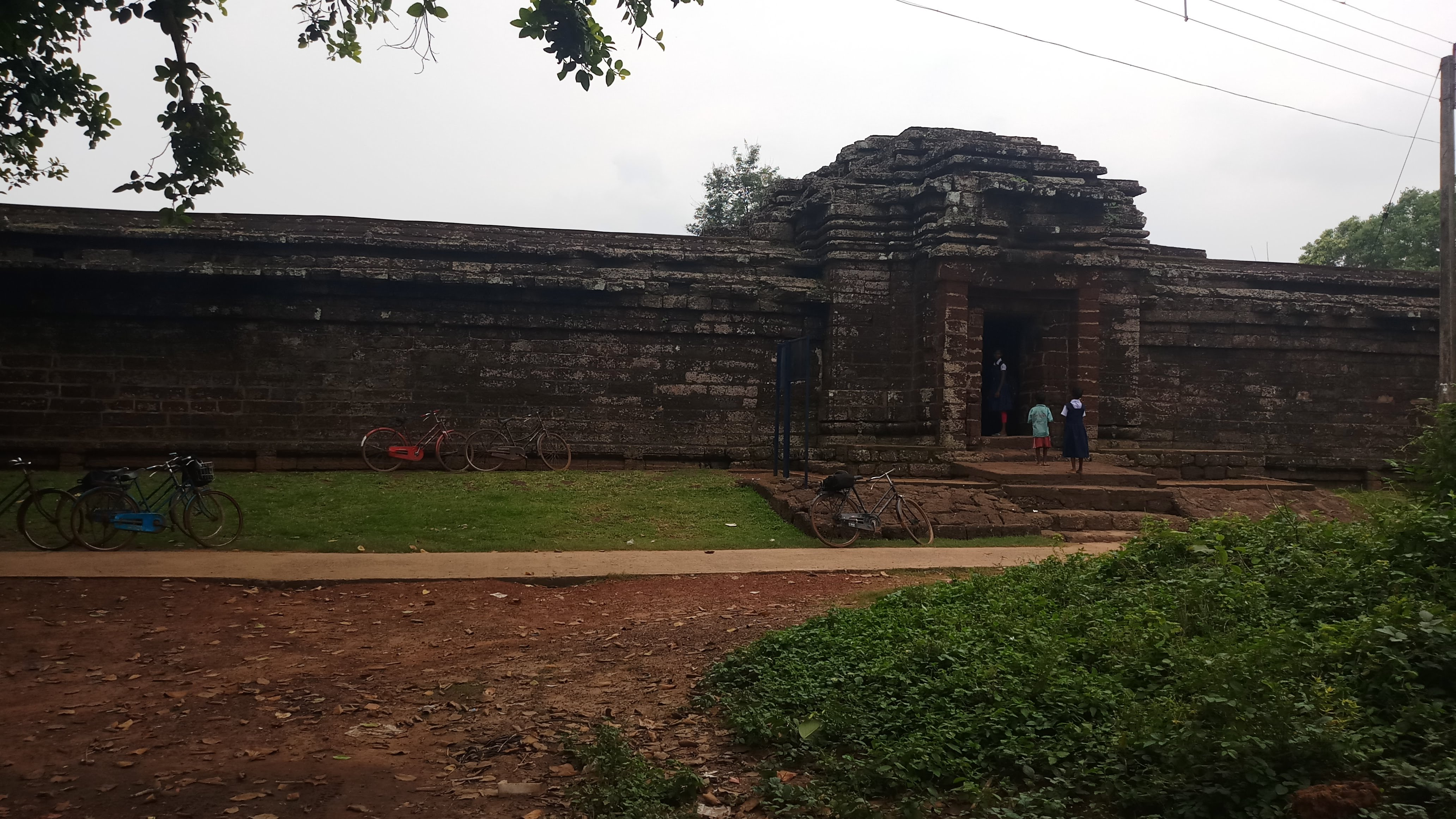
- A view of the fort entrance

Site information
- Type: Fort
- Code: IN-WB
- Controlled by: Archeological Survey of India
- Open to the public: Yes
- Condition: Restored

Location
- Location within West Bengal
- Coordinates: 22.51512°N 87.151779°E

Site history
- Built: 1438–1469 AD
- Built by: Suryavamsi Gajapati Kings of Odisha

Kurumbera Fort is a medieval fort situated in Gaganeshwar village, southeast of Keshiari, at about four kilometres from that town. The fort has small quarters and temples. It is a protected monument under the Archaeological Survey of India.

== Geography ==
Cities and towns in the southern portion of Kharagpur subdivision (including Dantan I & II, Mohanpur, Keshiary, Narayangarh and Sabang CD blocks) of Paschim Medinipur district
CT: census town, R: rural/ urban centre, H: historical/ religious centre
Owing to space constraints in the small map, the actual locations in a larger map may vary slightly

=== Location ===
Kurumbera Fort is situated in a village named Gaganeshwar, not serviced by any buses. To reach Gaganeshwar, take the State Highway to Keshiari, at about 27 km from Kharagpur, turn left towards Belda and reach a village junction called Kukai, at about 2 km from Keshiari. Turn to the right into a Concrete (pucca) road, Gaganeshwar village lies at about 2 km from Kukai.

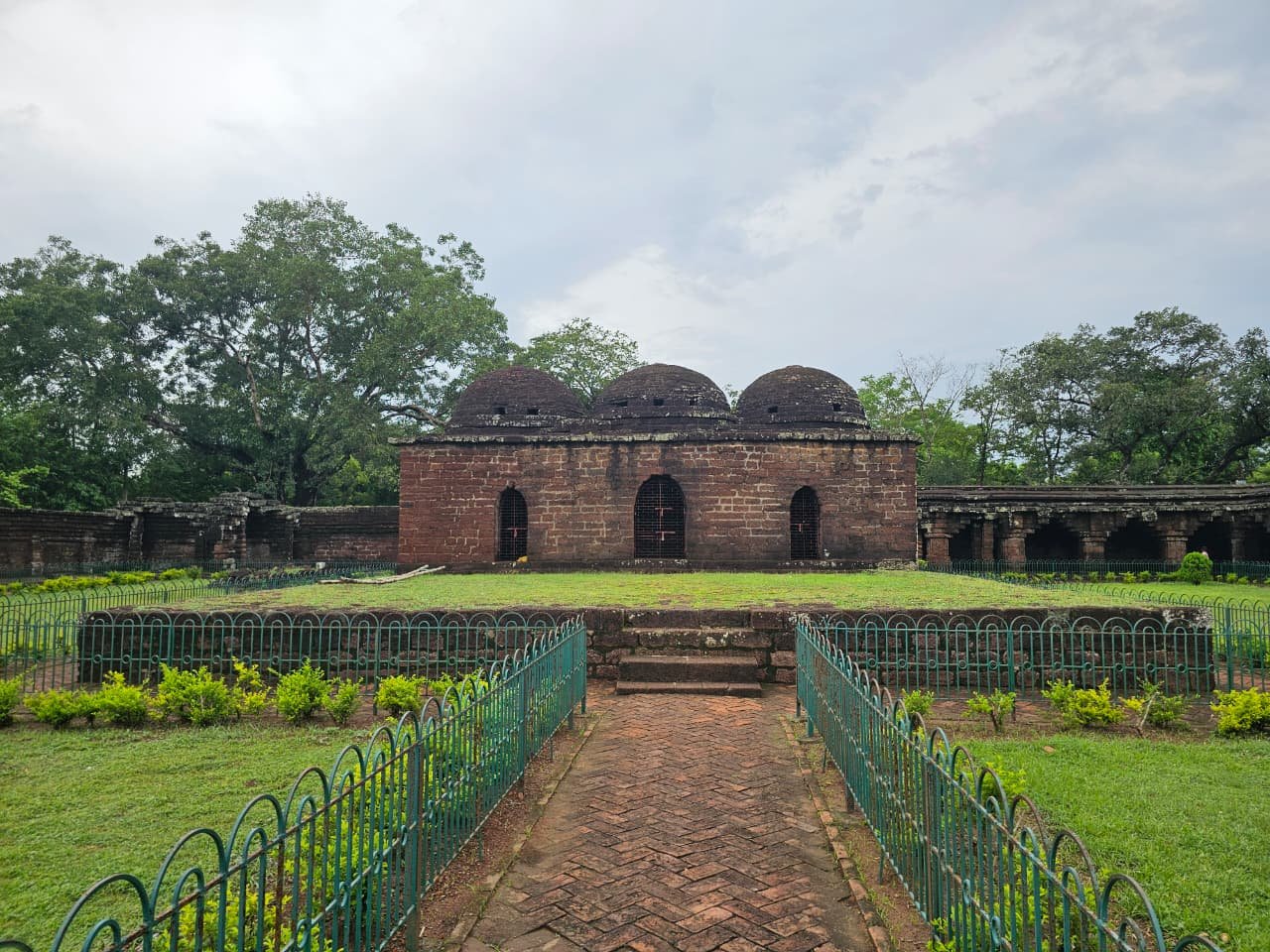
Three-domed structure

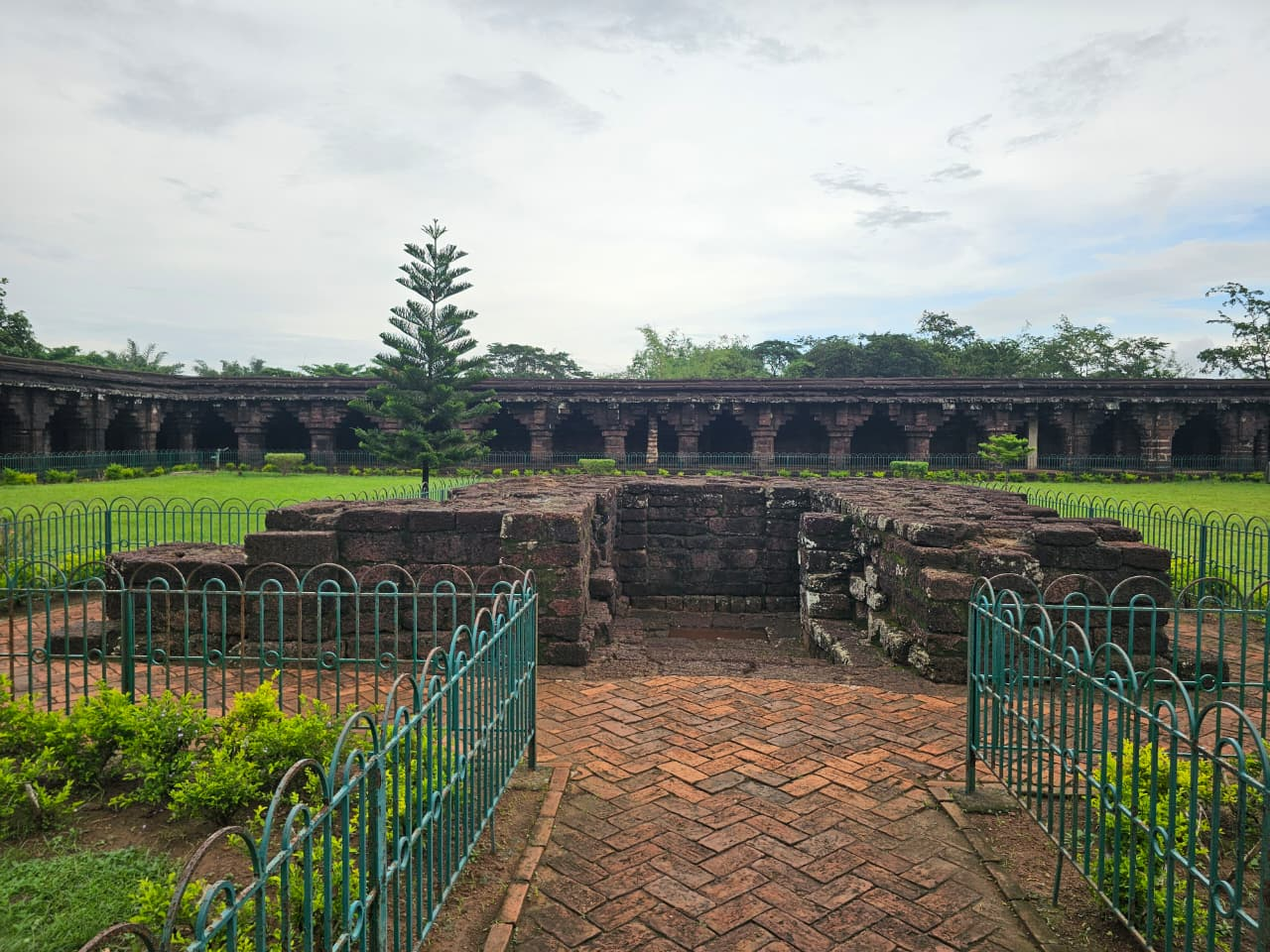
Temple foundation in the central courtyard of Kurumbera Fort

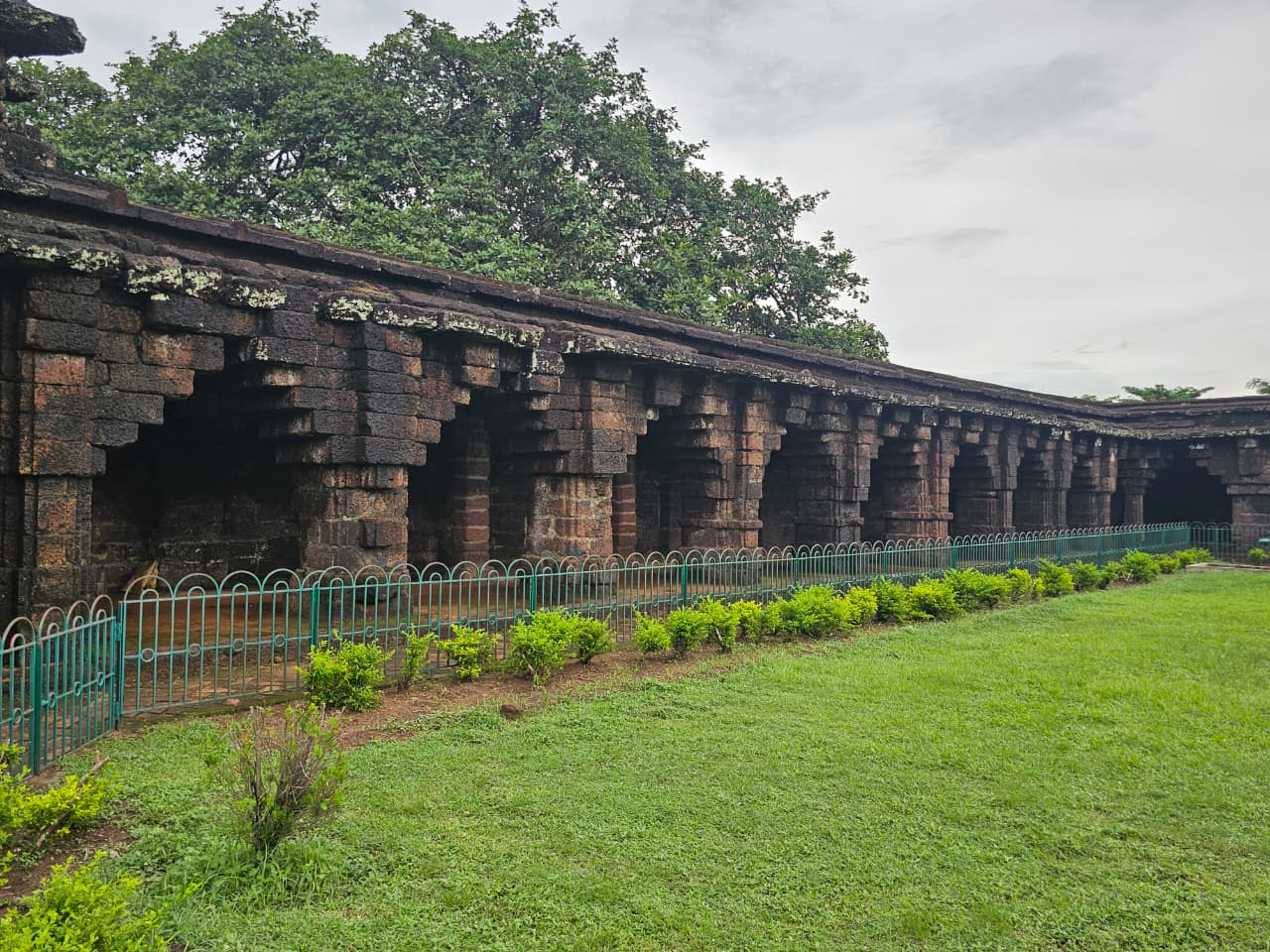
Pillared cloister surrounding the courtyard

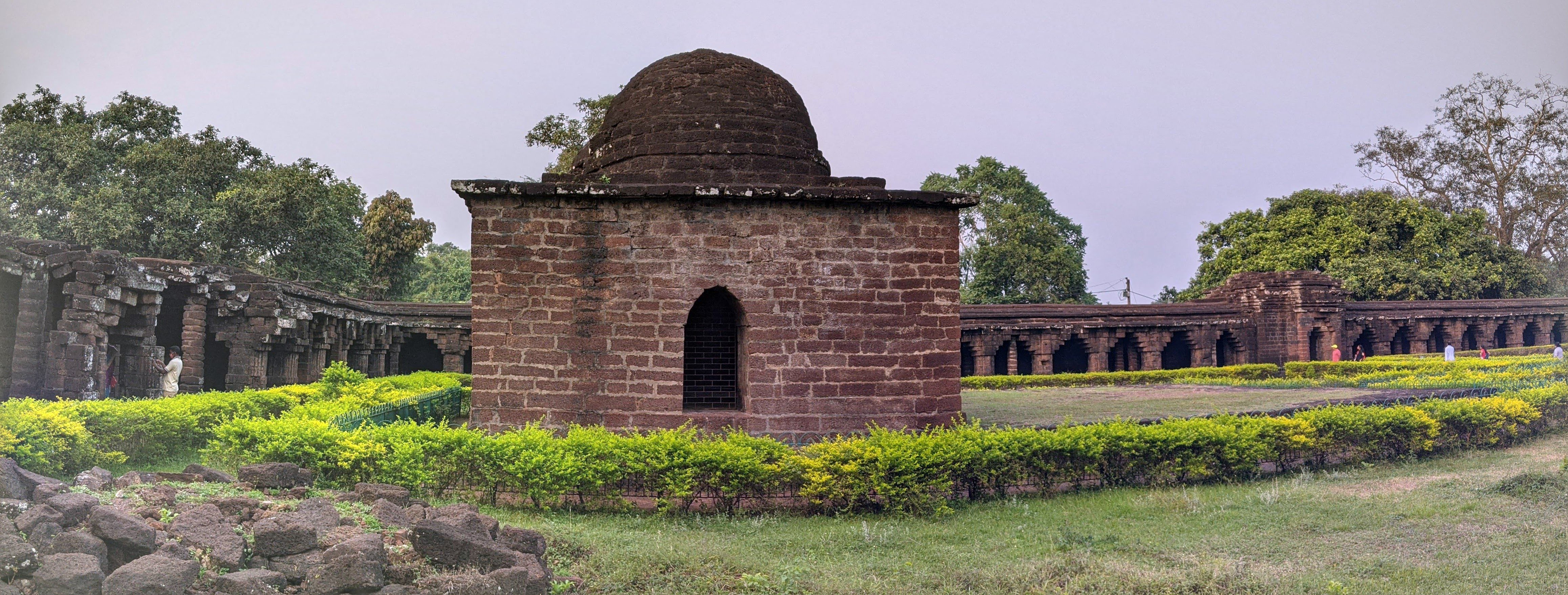
A structure inside Kurumbera Fort

This is an ancient fort preserved by the Archaeological Survey of India (ASI) under the Ancient Monuments Act. There is huge courtyard ringed by a pillared corridor and there are three spherical domes. There is also some kind of an altar in the middle of the fort. This monument resembles the architecture of ancient Odisha.

Note: The map alongside presents some of the notable locations in the subdivision. All places marked in the map are linked in the larger full screen map.

== About the fort ==
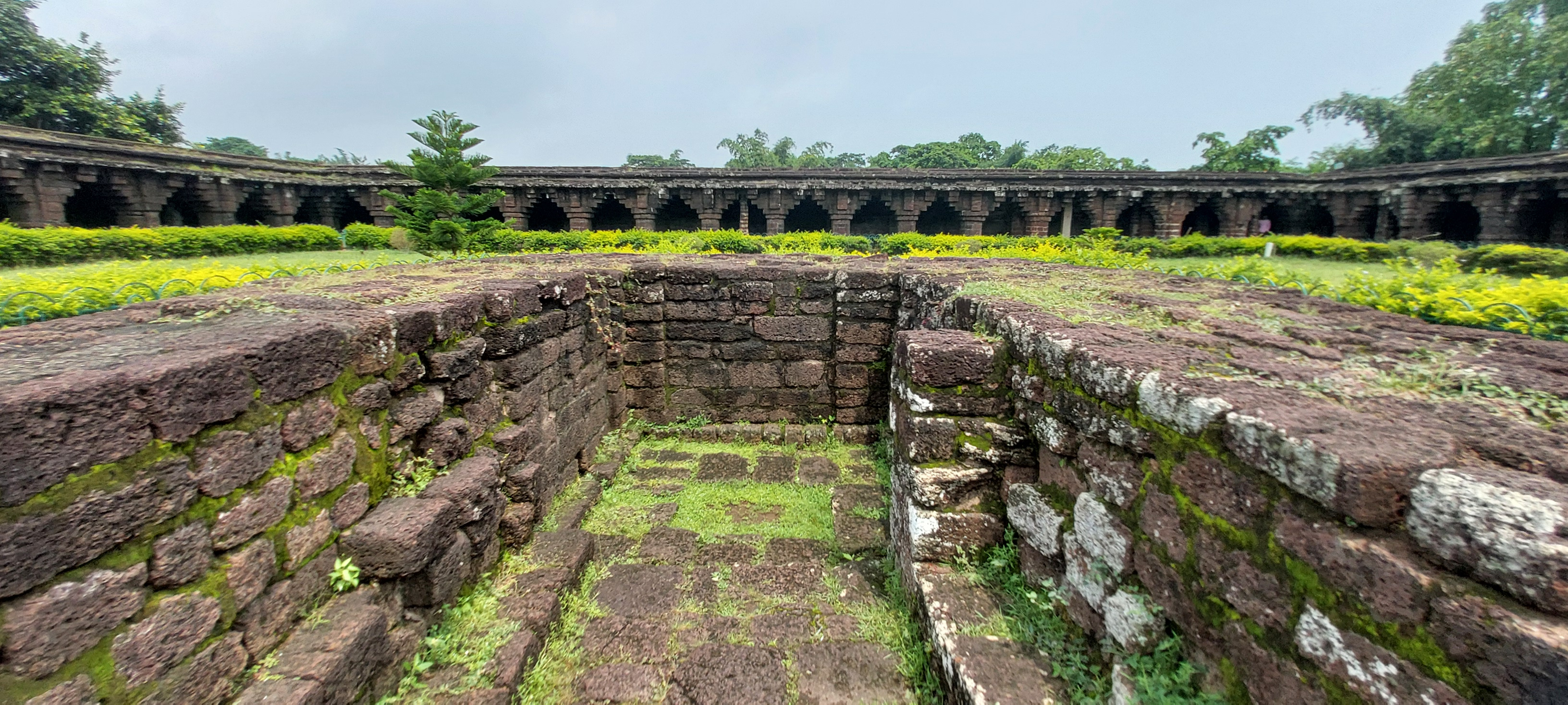
Well inside the Kurumbera fort

Built in 1438–1469 (written in Odia inscription) during the rule of Suryavamsa king of Odisha Gajapati Kapilendra Deva, it also has structures built during Aurangazeb's period by Mohammed Tahir (stone inscription). Despite being a protected monument under the ASI, there are no data available about this fort. In 1568, the Afghan Sultanate of Bengal and Bihar invaded Odisha which included the undivided Midnapore district of West Bengal. Later, Mughals occupied Odisha after defeating the Afghans of Bengal in the Battle of Tukaroi in 1575. They divided Odisha Subah into five Sarkars.

=== Structures inside the fort ===
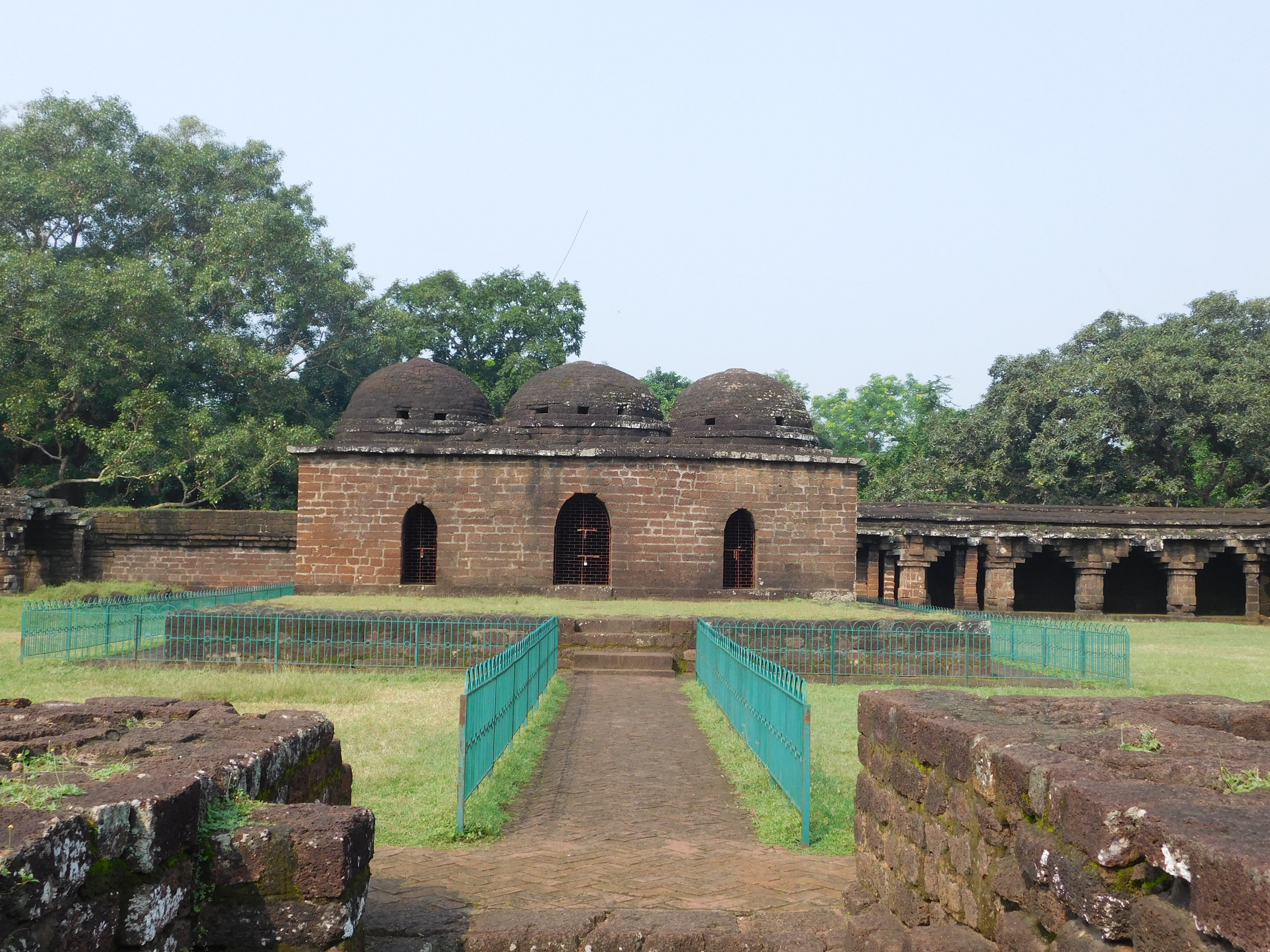
Kurumbera Fort

The structure resembles the medieval architecture of Odisha, while also incorporating elements of later Mughal architecture. The fort contains a three-domed structure over a platform, along with a sacrificial altar. Although most parts of this fort and its structures are in ruins, the ASI has taken considerable effort to protect the structures from collapsing by using cement and lime mortar to shore up the external pillars. The pillars support a roof which is shaped as a flower. Circular pillars were used to the rear of the left-dome. This fort's architecture also shares great similarity with Raibania Fort, in the Balasore district of Odisha.

An inscription about its usage is located directly behind the domed structure.

=== Architectural characteristics ===
Although Kurumbera is called a fort, it lacks all the basic characteristics of a fort, such as a safe storage space for weapons or gunpowder. There are no typical protective features such as a fortified main entrance, layered walls, bastions, moats, watchtowers, or secret exits. The structure does not readily afford the possibility of hiding soldiers for self-defence, nor does it provide any obvious place to plan for a strategic attack.

Rather, the structure appears humble, and suited for public gatherings. It resembles a mosque, where the altar is placed at the western end such that the entire crowd may face in the same direction. In spite of this, there is no written evidence or legend concerning such practices.
