= Gymnastics at the 1904 Summer Olympics – Men's club swinging =

Men's club swinging at the Games of the III Olympiad
- Date: October 28, 1904
- Competitors: ? from ? nations

Medalists
1st place, gold medalist(s)		Edward Hennig	United States
2nd place, silver medalist(s)		Emil Voigt	United States
3rd place, bronze medalist(s)		Ralph Wilson	United States

The men's club swinging was an artistic gymnastics event held as part of the gymnastics programme at the 1904 Summer Olympics. It was the only time the club swinging event was held, though an "Indian clubs" competition was held at the 1932 Summer Olympics. An unknown number of gymnasts competed, only three are known. The competition was held on Friday, October 28, 1904.

== Results ==
Place	Gymnast	Score
1	Edward Hennig (USA)	13
2	Emil Voigt (USA)	9
3	Ralph Wilson (USA)	5

== See also ==
- Indian club
- Gymnastics at the 1932 Summer_Olympics – Men's Indian clubs

== Sources ==
- De Wael, Herman (2000). "Herman's Full Olympians".
- Wudarski, Pawel (1999). "Wyniki Igrzysk Olimpijskich" (in Polish).
