= Moghalmari =

Archeological site in India

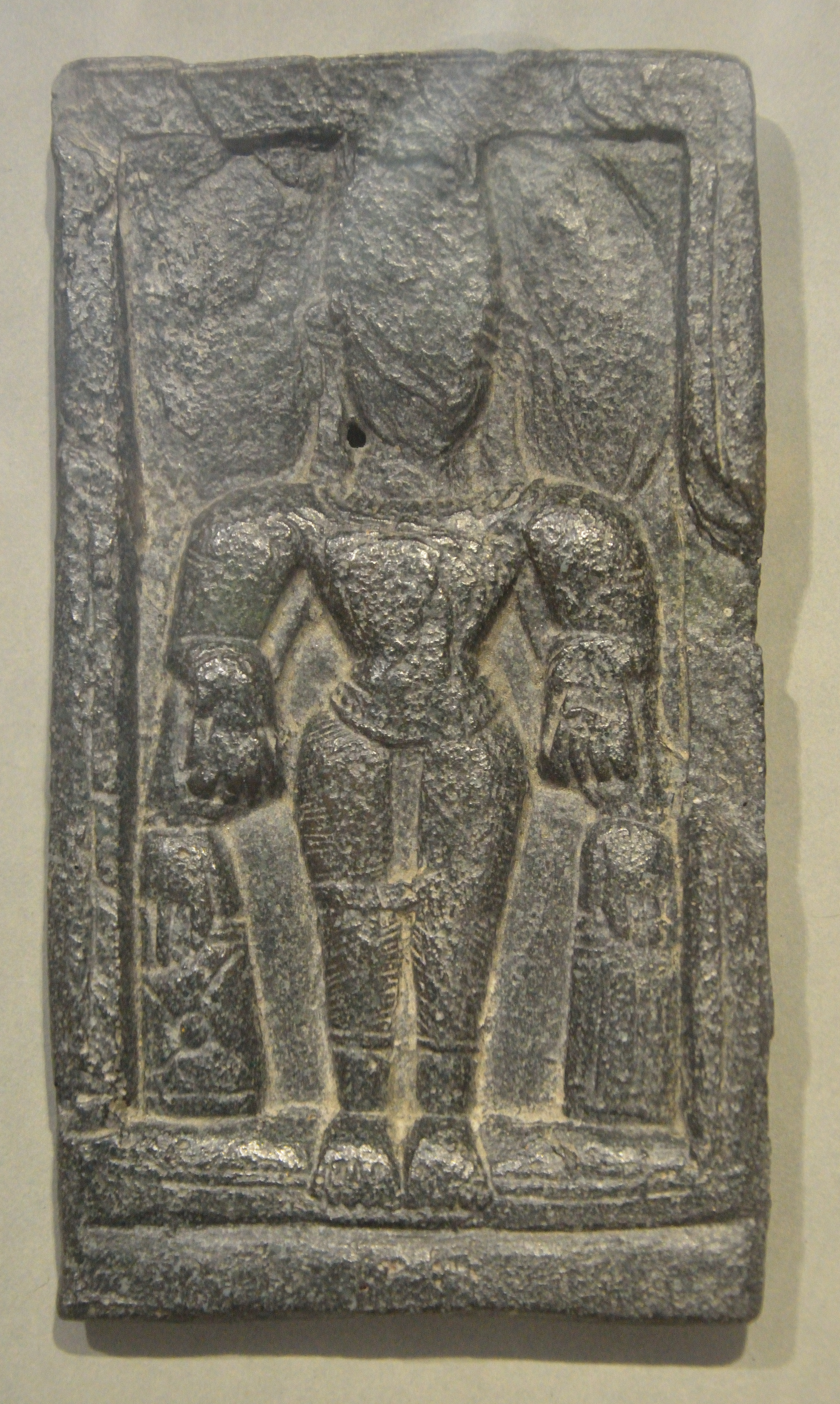
- Stone Figure of 5th-7th Century CE excavated in Moghalmari

- Location within West Bengal
- 21°59′33″N 87°17′47″E.
- Type: Settlement
- Location: West Bengal, India

Site notes
- Owner: Archaeological Survey of India

Moghalmari or Mogolmari is a village and an archaeological excavation site in the Dantan I CD block in the Kharagpur subdivision of the Paschim Medinipur district of West Bengal. The excavation of the site which began in 2002–03, led by Professor Ashoka Datta of Calcutta University has revealed the presence of a Buddhist monastery dated between 6th to 12th Century. A detailed excavation of the site started in November 2013 by the State Archaeological Directorate led to discovery of several artifacts and six tablets. Excavations at Moghalmari confirmed the presence of Buddhist vihars in the area, which was mentioned by Chinese travellers Fa Hien and Hiuen Tsang.

== Geography ==
Cities and towns in the southern portion of Kharagpur subdivision (including Dantan I & II, Mohanpur, Keshiary, Narayangarh and Sabang CD blocks) of Paschim Medinipur district
CT: census town, R: rural/ urban centre, H: historical/ religious centre
Owing to space constraints in the small map, the actual locations in a larger map may vary slightly

=== Location ===
Moghalmari is located at 21°59′33″N 87°17′47″E.

== Excavation ==
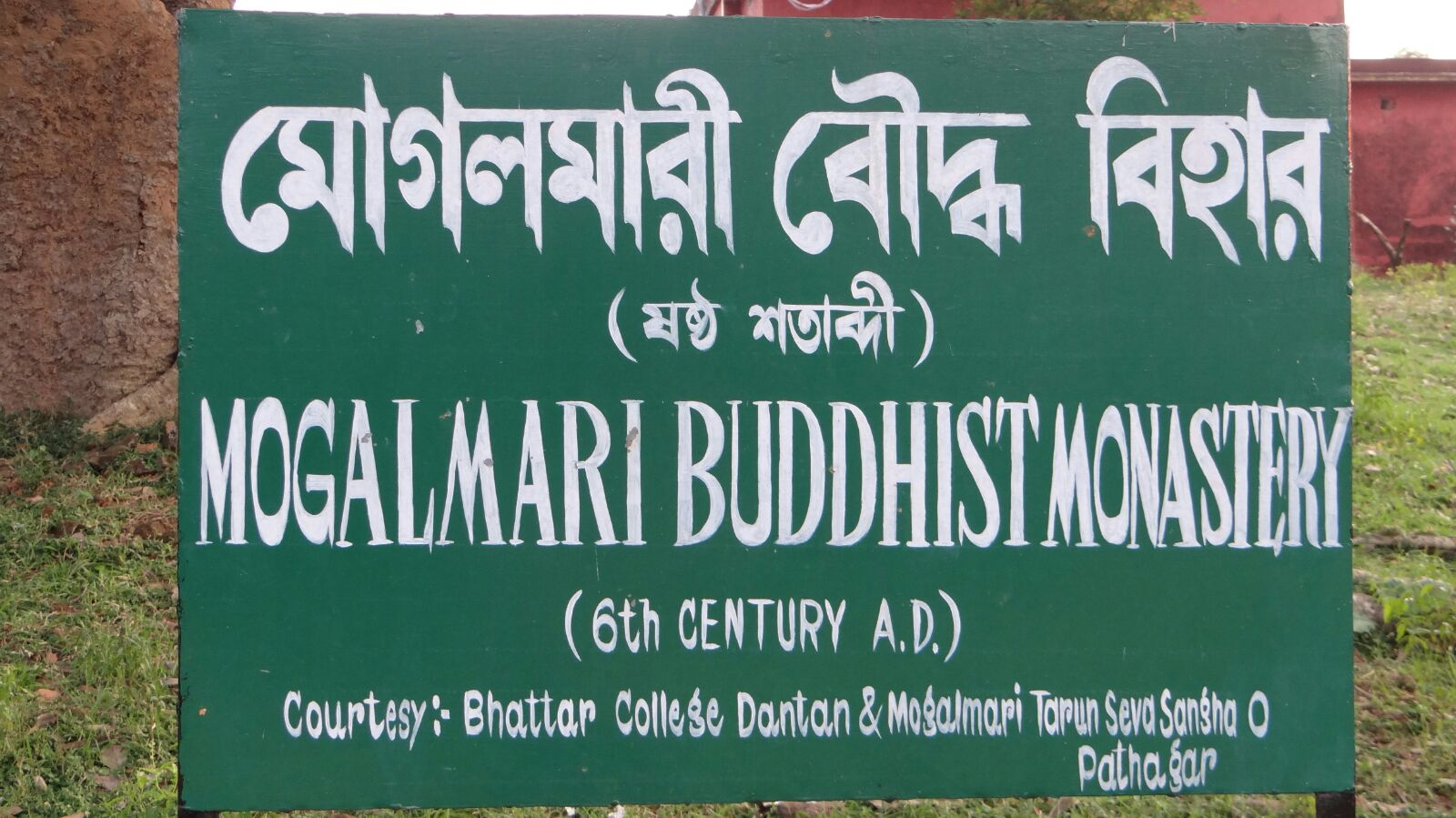

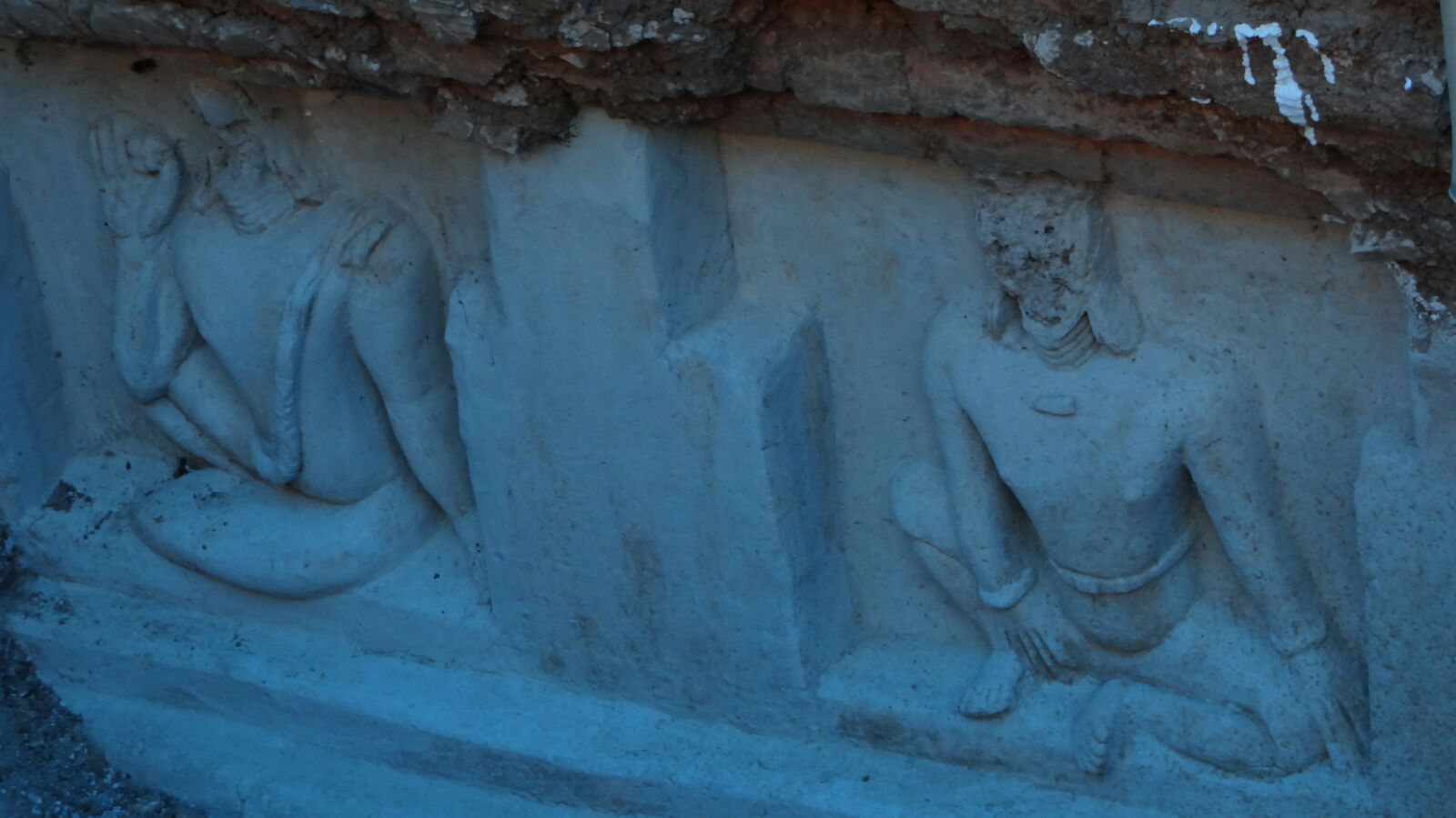

The first detailed excavation of the Moghalmari site started in 2003 by a group of archaeologists led by Asok Datta from Department of Archaeology, University of Calcutta. In the first phase of the excavation in 2003–04, two sites in the Mogholmari village was selected for the excavation. While the first site named MGM1, consisted of a structural mound with bricks strewn over the surface, locally known as Sakhisener dhibi or Sashisener dhibi. The other site named MGM2 situated over present habitation, consist of five circular brick bases of stupas and pottery strewn over the surface. The first site revealed a triratha projection in the western part of the site consisting of a wall running north–south which is considered to be a wall of a small monastic complex. The excavation also revealed square/rectangular structures (considered to be cells) apart from other antiquities. The second site revealed three circular brick structures considered to be base of stupas. The artifact remains indicated that it belongs to 6th-7th Century. Further excavation revealed silt deposition of 55 cm and the artifacts found below that layer consisted of Black and Red Wares.

In 2006-07 another extensive excavation was started on MGM1 and another site named MGM3. The excavations revealed a long wall covered with stucco decorations consisting of floral, animals and human figurines, and also evidenced two stages of construction of the structure. Another important discovery of the excavation was the discovery of a Buddha image on a slate stone.

Another round of excavations in 2012 revealed various stucco figures in the walls with votive tablets having figure of Buddha as the central element, and flanked by Bodhisattas and Buddhist inscriptions. The excavation also revealed a pradikshana path in the eastern and southern part of the site. The excavation has also revealed a central temple structure with cells surrounding a square courtyard. According to Rajat Sanyal, one of the member of the excavating team, the structure was constructed during the Vajrayana phase of Buddhism, where deity worship started in Buddhism, which can be inferred from the presence of figures of deities in the walls including Jambala and saraswati. The figurines and the artifacts evidences towards influence of Gupta tradition of middle Ganga region.

== See also ==
- Karnasubarna
