= Bailie Key =

American artistic gymnast (born 1999)

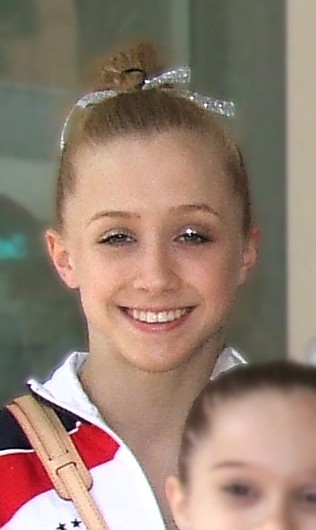
- Key at the City of Jesolo Trophy in Jesolo, Italy in March 2014

Personal information
- Full name: Bailie Jaye Key
- Born: March 16, 1999 (age 27) Augusta, Georgia, U.S.

Gymnastics career
- Discipline: Women's artistic gymnastics
- Country represented: United States (2011–2016)
- College team: Alabama Crimson Tide (2018–2019)
- Club: Texas Dreams Gymnastics
- Head coach: Kim Zmeskal-Burdette
- Assistant coach: Chris Burdette
- Choreographer: Kim Zmeskal-Burdette, Dominic Zito
- Music: The Polka (2010–2012), Rhythm, Baby! (Fidel Astro Remix) by Lars Winther (2013), "Crystallize" by Lindsey Stirling (2014)
- Retired: June 7, 2019
Medal record
Representing United States
Pacific Rim Championships
Gold medal – first place	2014 Richmond	Team
Gold medal – first place	2014 Richmond	All-Around
Gold medal – first place	2014 Richmond	Vault
Gold medal – first place	2014 Richmond	Floor Exercise
Silver medal – second place	2014 Richmond	Uneven Bars
Silver medal – second place	2014 Richmond	Balance Beam

Bailie Jaye Key (born March 16, 1999) is a retired American artistic gymnast. She was a member of the gold-medal-winning team at the 2014 Pacific Rim Championships and was the 2013 U.S. Junior National Champion.

== Early life ==
Key was born in Augusta, Georgia and trained at Texas Dreams Gymnastics under former gymnast and Olympic bronze medalist Kim Zmeskal and her husband, Chris Burdette. Her teammates included Peyton Ernst, Kennedy Baker and Veronica Hults.

== Gymnastics career ==
=== 2011–14: Junior international elite ===
In July 2011, Key competed at the 2011 U.S. CoverGirl Classic in Chicago, Illinois. She placed seventh in the overall standings. Later that year, she competed in the Visa National Championships. She came in ninth overall with a two-day combined score of 109.550.

Key competed at the 2012 City of Jesolo Trophy. She won a gold medal with the team. She scored 14.250 on the floor exercise, which was enough to give her a bronze medal, and she was third in the all-around. At the U.S. Classic, she scored a 56.600, placing fifth. A few weeks later, at the Visa Championships, Key finished fourth in the all-around but got a bronze medal on the balance beam and floor exercise.

In March 2013, Key went to the 2013 City of Jesolo Trophy. She won the all-around gold medal with 58.100 and another two golds and one bronze in the event finals. In July, she competed at the Secret U.S. Classic, where she won the all-around title with a score of 58.250. She scored a 14.000 on floor, 14.250 on uneven bars to finish in fifth, 15.000 on vault to place third, and 15.000 on beam to place second. In August, Key competed at the P&G National Championships, which took place over two days, with the combined scores determining final placings. Key won gold in the all-around, beam and floor and placed fourth on bars and vault. Her scores for Day 1 were 15.350 on beam, 13.950 on bars, 14.800 on floor and 15.100 on vault. Her Day 2 scores were 15.550 on beam, 14.100 on bars, 14.950 on floor and 14.750 on vault. Her total all-around score was 118.550.

Following her all-around win at the P&G Championships, Key was selected along with Laurie Hernandez, who placed second at the P&G Championships, to represent the United States at the Junior Japan International in Yokohama, Japan. Key won the all-around with a score of 58.400. She also won the vault, uneven bars, balance beam and floor exercise titles.

In November, Key was selected, along with fellow junior gymnasts Hernandez, Veronica Hults and Emily Gaskins and senior gymnasts Maggie Nichols and Peyton Ernst to represent the United States at the 2013 Mexican Open in Acapulco, Mexico. Key helped the American juniors take the team title in the International Junior Cup and also won the all-around title ahead of Hernandez, Gaskins and Hults, who finished second, third and fourth, respectively; however, only Key and Hernandez were awarded the gold and silver medals because of a two-per-country rule.

In 2014, Key competed at the City of Jesolo Trophy in Jesolo, Italy. The United States won the team competition, and she won the all-around and three events (vault, bars and floor) and placed second on beam. She was named to the American team for the Pacific Rim Championships in Richmond, Canada, in April 2014. There, she won the all-around, vault and floor medals for the junior division and placed second on uneven bars and balance beam.

Key withdrew from the 2014 Secret U.S. Classic because of a minor arm injury.

Later in the season, she withdrew from the 2014 P&G National Championships with the same nagging arm injury and was consequently unable to defend her national title.

On September 14, 2014, Key verbally committed to the Florida Gators women's gymnastics team. She announced the news through social media.

=== 2015–2016: Senior career ===
Key became age-eligible for senior level competition in 2015. In March of that year she competed at the 2015 City of Jesolo Trophy as part of the United States' senior team. In the all-around she won silver behind Simone Biles with a score of 59.500, surpassing both Gabby Douglas and Aly Raisman. She placed second on the uneven bars and won a gold medal with the U.S team. On July 25, Key competed at the 2015 U.S. Classic. She placed fourth in the all-around with a score of 59.450, behind Biles, Gabby Douglas, and Maggie Nichols. She placed third on uneven bars behind Madison Kocian and Douglas, tied for fifth on balance beam with Nichols, and tied for third with Nichols on floor exercise behind Biles and Douglas. At the 2015 National Championships Key finished fourth in the all-around with a 2-night score of 118.350, behind Biles, Nichols, and Raisman. Overall she finished tenth on balance beam, third on floor exercise, and third on uneven bars. Key was named to the Senior National Team for the first time and received an invitation to the 2015 Worlds Selection Camp in September. She was named as a non-traveling alternate to the 2015 World Championships team.

Key was scheduled to compete at the 2016 U.S. Classic, but she later withdrew. Two weeks later, Key had decided to end her 2016 season due to an ongoing back injury, therefore ending her potential bid for the 2016 U.S. Women's Olympic Gymnastics team and her elite gymnastics career.

On September 30, 2016, Key announced that she had committed to the University of Alabama and the Alabama Crimson Tide gymnastics team, having previously been verbally committed to the University of Florida. She signed the National Letter of Intent to the University of Alabama and the Crimson Tide gymnastics team on November 10, 2016.

=== 2018–2019: NCAA career ===
Key joined the University of Alabama Crimson Tide gymnastics team for the 2018 season. She competed in the season opener at Michigan, where she fell off the balance beam, receiving a score of 8.475. This would ultimately be the only competitive routine of her college career.

In January 2019, it was announced that Key would miss the 2019 season due to an unspecified medical procedure.

In June 2019, Key announced her retirement from gymnastics.

== Competitive history ==
Year	Event	Team	AA	VT	UB	BB	FX
Junior
2011	American Classic		6	8	8		1st place, gold medalist(s)
2011	CoverGirl Classic		7				6
2011	Visa Championships		9			8	7
2012	City of Jesolo Trophy	1st place, gold medalist(s)	3rd place, bronze medalist(s)	2nd place, silver medalist(s)	6		
2012	Secret U.S. Classic		5	4	6	5	5
2012	U.S. National Championships		4	3rd place, bronze medalist(s)	7	3rd place, bronze medalist(s)	3rd place, bronze medalist(s)
2013	City of Jesolo Trophy		1st place, gold medalist(s)	1st place, gold medalist(s)	3rd place, bronze medalist(s)	1st place, gold medalist(s)	1st place, gold medalist(s)
2013	GER-ROU-USA Friendly	1st place, gold medalist(s)	1st place, gold medalist(s)				
2013	Secret U.S. Classic		1st place, gold medalist(s)	3rd place, bronze medalist(s)	5	2nd place, silver medalist(s)	5
2013	P&G Championships		1st place, gold medalist(s)	4	4	1st place, gold medalist(s)	1st place, gold medalist(s)
2013	Japan Junior International		1st place, gold medalist(s)	1st place, gold medalist(s)	1st place, gold medalist(s)	1st place, gold medalist(s)	1st place, gold medalist(s)
2013	Mexico Open	1st place, gold medalist(s)	1st place, gold medalist(s)				
2014	City of Jesolo Trophy	1st place, gold medalist(s)	1st place, gold medalist(s)	1st place, gold medalist(s)	1st place, gold medalist(s)	2nd place, silver medalist(s)	1st place, gold medalist(s)
2014	Pacific Rim Championships	1st place, gold medalist(s)	1st place, gold medalist(s)	1st place, gold medalist(s)	2nd place, silver medalist(s)	2nd place, silver medalist(s)	1st place, gold medalist(s)
Senior
2015	City of Jesolo Trophy	1st place, gold medalist(s)	2nd place, silver medalist(s)		2nd place, silver medalist(s)		
2015	Secret U.S. Classic		4		3rd place, bronze medalist(s)	5	3rd place, bronze medalist(s)
2015	P&G Championships		4		3rd place, bronze medalist(s)	10	3rd place, bronze medalist(s)
