= Kytra Hunter =

American artistic gymnast

- Full name: Kytra Tinisha Hunter
- Born: October 25, 1991 (age 35)
- Height: 5 ft 0 in (152 cm)

Gymnastics career
- Discipline: Women's artistic gymnastics
- Country represented: United States; (2009–2010 (USA))
- College team: Florida Gators; graduated
- Club: Hill's Gymnastics
- Head coach: Rhonda Faehn
- Former coach: Kelli Hill
- Music: Sota by Kolo (2009-2010), Memphis Bells by The Prodigy (2012), Solidified by Gramatik (2013)
Medal record
Women's gymnastics
Representing the United States
City of Jesolo Trophy
Gold medal – first place	2010 Jesolo	Team
Representing Florida Gators
NCAA Championships
Gold medal – first place	2013 Los Angeles	Team
Gold medal – first place	2015 Fort Worth	All-around
Gold medal – first place	2012 Fort Worth	Vault
Silver medal – second place	2012 Duluth	Team

Kytra Tinisha Hunter (born October 25, 1991) is a former American artistic gymnast who competed for the University of Florida from 2011–15. One of Florida's most decorated gymnasts, Hunter is a 25-time All-American and a four-time individual NCAA national champion. She was a 2012 and 2015 recipient of the Honda Award.

== Personal life ==
Hunter was born to parents Kimberly and De-Forrest Hunter. She has one brother, DeForrest, who played basketball, football and ran track. She began gymnastics when she was 4 years old after her parents saw an advertisement in the local newspaper in South Carolina as she comes from a military background with her father serving in the Army for 26 years.

== Junior career ==
Hunter qualified as an elite gymnast in 2006, winning silver medals in the all-around and vault finals of the Junior Olympic Championships. She went on to compete at the 2006 Visa Championships in the junior elite division, where she finished 6th on vault.

== Senior career ==
In 2009, Hunter competed at the CoverGirl Classic in Des Moines, Iowa, where she finished 7th on vault. At the Visa Championships in Dallas, she won a bronze medal on the floor exercise and placed 4th in the all-around. She made the national team and was chosen as an alternate for the 2009 World Artistic Gymnastics Championships. That same year, she received her first international assignments, competing in Germany, France and Japan.

In 2010, she was chosen to represent Team USA at the City of Jesolo Trophy, where she helped the US win gold in the team competition and placed 9th in the individual all-around. She won gold and bronze medals at the CoverGirl Classic and once again placed 4th in the all-around at the Visa Championships. She was chosen as an alternate for the 2010 World Artistic Gymnastics Championships.

== College career ==
Hunter accepted an athletic scholarship to attend the University of Florida beginning in the fall of 2011. In the 2012 season, her first with the Gators, she earned the maximum of five All-American honors, became the regional floor exercise champion, and won the Southeastern Conference (SEC) all-around and vault championships. She became the first Florida gymnast to claim multiple NCAA titles in the same year, winning both the all-around (scoring 39.725) and vault. She was also the recipient of Honda Sports Award, recognizing her as the nation's top college women's gymnast for 2011–12.

Hunter graduated in 2015, finishing her college career as a two-time team SEC champion, a three-time team NCAA champion, a four-time individual NCAA champion (two all-around titles, a vault title and a floor title), and a seven-time individual SEC champion. She won the 2013 and 2015 Honda Award for gymnastics.

Awards
Preceded by Kim Jacob	Honda Sports Award (gymnastics); 2015	Succeeded by Bridget Sloan
