= Claire Boyce =

American artistic gymnast

- Full name: Claire Ann Boyce
- Born: April 25, 1995 (age 31) St Louis, Missouri
- Height: 167.6 cm (5 ft 6 in)

Gymnastics career
- Discipline: Women's artistic gymnastics
- College team: Florida Gators
- Club: Texas Dreams
- Head coach: Jenny Rowland
- Former coaches: Rhonda Faehn; Kim Zmeskal

Claire Ann Boyce (born April 25, 1995, in St Louis, Missouri) is a retired American collegiate artistic gymnast. She competed for the Florida Gators women's gymnastics team from 2013 to 2017.

== Early life ==
Claire Ann Boyce was born on April 25, 1995, in St Louis, Missouri, to parents, David and Kimberly Boyce. She has two brothers, Brian and Luke. She started gymnastics classes at the age of two and a half, in 1998, at Great American Gymnastics Express. Later, she moved to Diamond Gymnastics and then, in 2005, at the age of ten, she moved to Edmond, Oklahoma, and started training at Dynamo Gymnastics. A year later, Boyce was fourth at the 2006 Level 9 Westerns.

== Club gymnastics career ==
=== 2007–09 Level 10 career, Junior International Elite at GAGE ===
Claire transitioned to Level 10 for the 2007 season; at the age of eleven. She was sixth at States and second at Regionals during the season. At Nationals, she placed fifth in the all-around. Boyce qualified to Junior International Elite status at the May National Elite Qualifier at the Karolyi Ranch. Later in the month, Boyce participated at the American Classic which was, again, held at the Karolyi Ranch. She placed fifth.

In March 2008, Claire's family moved back to Kansas City and so therefore, she started training at Great American Gymnastics Express again. In 2009, Boyce qualified to Junior International Elite status at the Palm Beach Invitational. Boyce won floor at the American Classic. Later, at the U.S. Classic, Claire finished twenty-second in the all-around. She earned a qualification spot to U.S. Nationals. At Nationals, Boyce finished seventeenth after two days of competition. In addition, she placed fourth on floor exercise; missing the bronze medal by just 0.050 points.

=== 2010–11: International Elite career at Texas Dreams ===
On March 2, 2010, her personal website announced that she had moved to Texas Dreams Gymnastics in Coppell, Texas, training under Chris and Kim Zmeskal-Burdette. In June, she participated in the Arizona Elite Qualifier and finished second in the all-around; tying with Jaclyn McCartin. A month later, Boyce competed at the National Elite Qualifier but competed only two events. At the CoverGirl Classic, Boyce placed tenth in the all-around. Her performances at the previous Arizona Elite Qualifier had secured her a qualification spot to Nationals already. At Nationals, following a rough competition, Boyce was twenty-seventh in the all-around.

Early in the season, Boyce was fourth at the Texas Prime Meet. Later, she finished second in the WOGA Classic. In June, she won the Disney National Elite Qualifier and advanced to Senior International Elite status but, however, she was sidelined for most of the season with a back injury. On September 14, 2011, CollegeGymFans.com announced her verbal commitment to the University of Florida and the Florida Gators women's gymnastics team.

=== 2012–13: Level 10 career ===
After struggling with back issues, Claire decided to drop down to Level 10 for both the 2012 and 2013 seasons. In 2012, she was third at States and second at Regionals. At Nationals, she was the all-around champion for the Senior A division. On November 12, 2012, Claire signed the National Letter of Intent to the Florida Gators program. In 2013, she competed two invitationals but didn't compete once during the Championship season.
