= Peyton Ernst =

American artistic gymnast

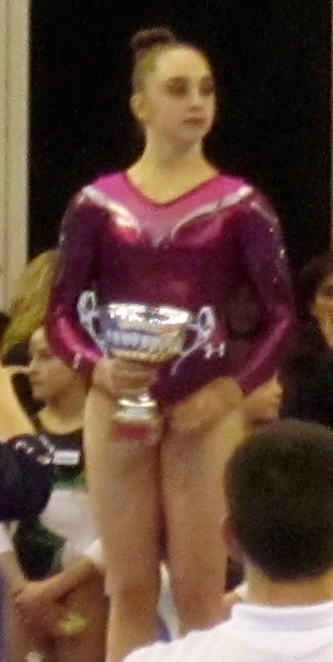
- Ernst in Jesolo in 2014

Personal information
- Full name: Peyton Michelle Ernst
- Nickname: Pey
- Born: January 27, 1997 (age 29) Covington, Louisiana, U.S.
- Height: 5 ft 2 in (157 cm)

Gymnastics career
- Discipline: Women's artistic gymnastics
- Country represented: United States (2012–14 (USA))
- College team: University of Alabama (2017-19) transfer from University of Florida (2015-2016)
- Club: Texas Dreams Gymnastics
- Head coach: Kim Zmeskal-Burdette
- Music: Stairway to Heaven by Led Zeppelin (2010-11)
- Retired: June 12, 2015 (elite); September 20, 2018 (collegiate)
Medal record
Women's artistic gymnastics
Representing United States
Pacific Rim Championships
Gold medal – first place	2014 Richmond	Team
City of Jesolo Trophy
Gold medal – first place	2013 Jesolo	Team
Gold medal – first place	2014 Jesolo	Team
Silver medal – second place	2014 Jesolo	All-Around
FIG World Cup
Silver medal – second place	2013 Tokyo	All Around
Mexican Open
Silver medal – second place	2013 Acapulco	All Around

Peyton Michelle Ernst (born January 27, 1997) is an American former collegiate and artistic gymnast.

== Personal life ==
Ernst was born in Covington, Louisiana, in 1997 and began gymnastics in 1999. She currently lives in Coppell, Texas. Ernst recently graduated from the University of Alabama. She also has three sisters, Bailey (27), Madison (24) and Reilly (22). All of them have been involved in gymnastics at some point since 2013. Ernst was the only elite gymnast of the family. Ernst signed the National Letter of Intent to the University of Florida in November 2014 and attended the school from the fall of 2015 to the spring of 2016. Ernst was placed on medical leave from University of Florida. Ernst transferred to the University of Alabama and began taking classes in the Spring of 2017. On September 20, 2018, Ernst had announced her retirement from gymnastics on her Instagram page.

== Junior career ==
Ernst started her junior career in 2011, and at that year's Visa Championships, she finished sixth in balance beam.

At the 2012 Secret U.S. Classic, Ernst was sixth in all-around, fifth in vault, and seventh in uneven bars. At the Visa Championships, she was seventh in all-around, eighth in vault, and eighth in balance beam.

== Senior career ==
Ernst started her senior career in 2013. At the City of Jesolo Trophy, she finished fourth in all-around and first with the team. Ernst then traveled to Germany for competition where she placed second in the all-around and first with the team. After Germany, she then traveled to Tokyo, Japan where she placed 2nd all-around. At the Secret U.S. Classic, she was second in all-around, first on balance beam, second on floor exercise, and fourth on uneven bars. At the 2013 P&G Championships in Hartford, Connecticut she placed forth in the all-around, on the uneven bars, and the balance beam. Her last meet in 2013 was the Mexican Open in Acapulco, Mexico where she placed second all-around.

She started 2014 in Jesolo, Italy for the City of Jesolo Trophy competition where she ended up second all- around and first place with the team. Ernst next went to the 2014 Pacific Rim Championships in Richmond, British Columbia where she replaced Simone Biles and ended up placing first in the team finals with the USA team. Ernst did not compete floor exercise and as a result finished 18th in the All Around.
