= Bridget Sloan =

American artistic gymnast (born 1992)

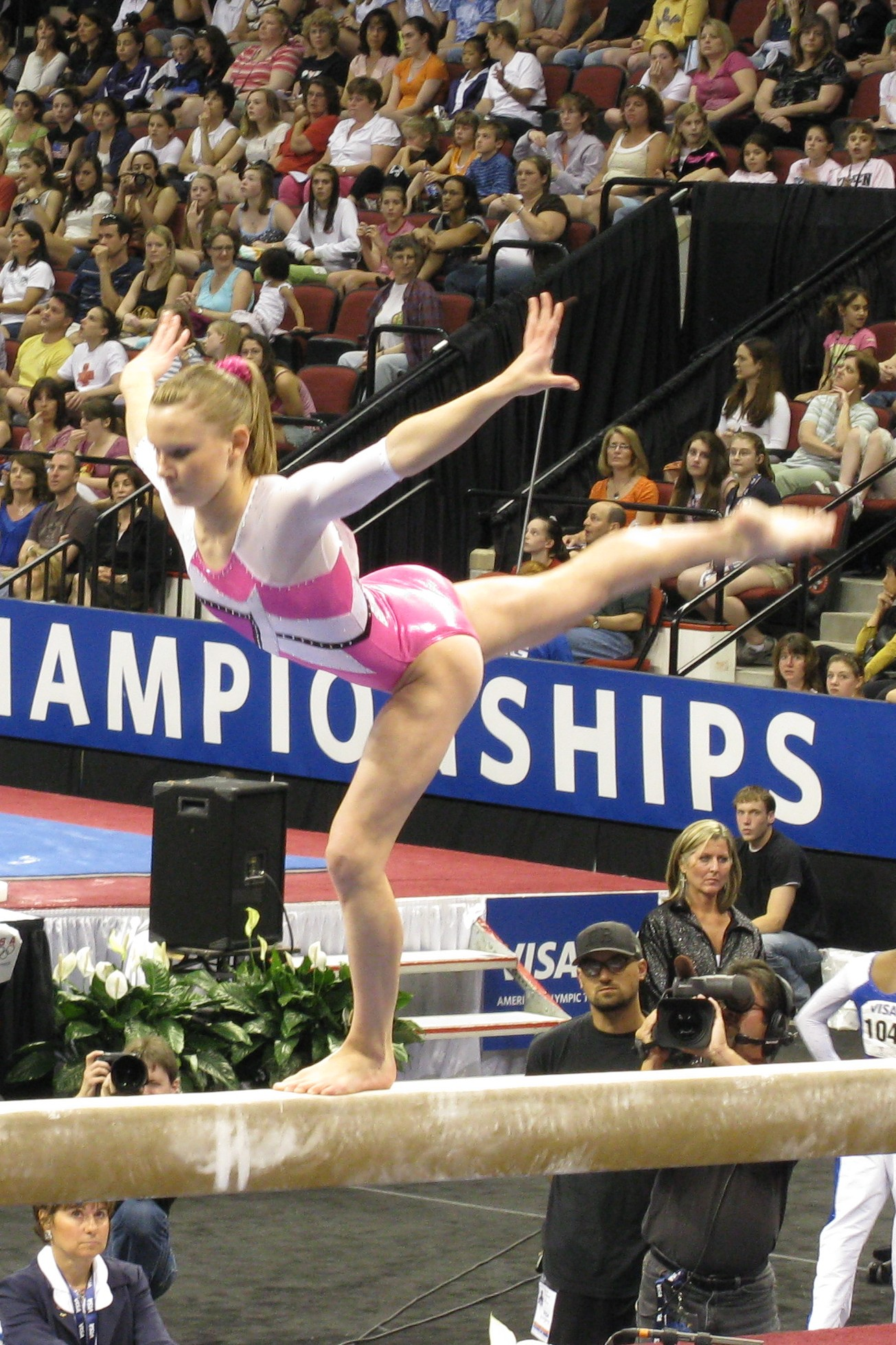
- Sloan performs on the balance beam at the 2008 U.S. National Championships in Boston, MA.

Personal information
- Full name: Bridget Elizabeth Sloan
- Born: June 23, 1992 (age 34) Cincinnati, Ohio, U.S.
- Height: 5 ft (152 cm) 1

Gymnastics career
- Discipline: Women's artistic gymnastics
- Country represented: United States (2005–2013)
- College team: Florida Gators (2013–2016)
- Club: Sharp's Gymnastics Academy
- Head coach: Jenny Rowland
- Former coaches: Marvin Sharp; Rhonda Faehn
- Retired: April 16, 2016
Medal record
Women's artistic gymnastics
Representing the United States
Olympic Games
| Silver medal – second place | 2008 Beijing | Team |
World Championships
| Gold medal – first place | 2009 London | All-Around |
| Silver medal – second place | 2010 Rotterdam | Team |
Pan American Games
| Gold medal – first place | 2011 Guadalajara | Team |
Pacific Rim Championships
| Gold medal – first place | 2010 Melbourne | Team |
Representing Florida Gators
NCAA National Championships
| Gold medal – first place | 2013 Los Angeles | Team |
| Gold medal – first place | 2013 Los Angeles | All-Around |
| Gold medal – first place | 2013 Los Angeles | Balance Beam |
| Gold medal – first place | 2014 Birmingham | Team |
| Gold medal – first place | 2014 Birmingham | Uneven Bars |
| Gold medal – first place | 2015 Fort Worth | Team |
| Gold medal – first place | 2016 Fort Worth | All-Around |
| Gold medal – first place | 2016 Fort Worth | Balance Beam |
| Gold medal – first place | 2016 Fort Worth | Uneven Bars |
| Silver medal – second place | 2013 Los Angeles | Uneven Bars |
| Silver medal – second place | 2015 Fort Worth | Vault |
| Silver medal – second place | 2015 Fort Worth | Uneven Bars |
- Education: Tri-West Hendricks High School

Bridget Elizabeth Sloan (born June 23, 1992) is an American artistic gymnast. She is the 2009 world champion in the all-around, the 2009 United States national champion, and a silver medalist with the American team at the 2008 Summer Olympics in Beijing.

From 2012 to 2016, Sloan was a member of the University of Florida women's gymnastics team that won three consecutive NCAA National Championships titles. She was also the 2013 NCAA national champion in the all-around and on the balance beam, and the 2014 NCAA champion on the uneven bars. In 2015, she became the first University of Florida gymnast, and the seventh NCAA gymnast, to score a perfect 10 on each of the four events. At the 2016 NCAA Nationals, her final championship, she won titles in all-around, uneven bars, and balance beam.

== Early life ==
Bridget Elizabeth Sloan was born on June 23, 1992, in Cincinnati, Ohio; grew up in Pittsboro, Indiana; and graduated from Tri-West Hendricks High School. She began gymnastics at the age of 4 and trained at Sharp's Gymnastics Academy in Indianapolis.

== Elite gymnastics career ==
=== 2007 ===
In her first year as a senior, Sloan placed fifth in the all-around and third on bars at the U.S. National Championships, and was the alternate on the American team for the 2007 World Championships. She represented the United States at the Good Luck Beijing Olympic test event in December, winning the bronze medal in the all-around and a silver on floor exercise.

=== 2008 ===
In March 2008, Sloan suffered a torn meniscus while warming up at a meet in Italy. She returned home for surgery and rehabilitation, and recovered in time to compete at the National Championships—where she performed only on beam, bars, and floor—and the U.S. Olympic Trials. Sloan was named to the Olympic team after the final selection camp in July 2008.

At the Olympics, Sloan competed in both the qualifying and team final rounds. Her performances became critical in the qualifications, where the Americans were forced to put up only four athletes on three events, and count all four scores, after Chellsie Memmel and Samantha Peszek were injured. Sloan made small errors on floor and uneven bars but performed well overall. Her all-around scores placed her 11th among all competitors. In the team finals, she competed on vault, contributing a 15.200 score to the American team's silver medal.

=== 2009 ===
In February 2009, Sloan competed in the American Cup and placed second to 13-year-old Jordyn Wieber. In August, she competed at Nationals and won the all-around, floor and uneven bars.

In October, at the 2009 World Championships in London, Sloan qualified fifth for the all-around and seventh for the uneven bars final. In the all-around final, she won the gold medal over teammate Rebecca Bross by 0.050, becoming the fifth American woman to win the world all-around title. In the bars final, she placed sixth.

=== 2010 ===
Injuries plagued Sloan throughout the year, greatly limiting her in competitions. An ankle injury early in the year limited her participation in the Pacific Rim Championships to bars. The same injury kept Sloan to the beam at the U.S. Classic. A new pectoral injury prevented her from defending her national all-around title. At Nationals, she performed two tentative beam routines, one that included a fall, and placed 11th on the apparatus. However, Sloan impressed National Team Coordinator Márta Károlyi with her improvement at the selection camp, and was brought to the World Championships to perform on bars and floor, placing fourth in the bars final.

=== 2011 ===
Sloan sat out the majority of the competitive season while recovering from surgery on her bicep. She stated that it was unlikely she would take part in the 2011 National or World Championships in an effort to stay healthy for the 2012 season, her ultimate goal being the 2012 Olympics.

Although Sloan did not compete in the 2011 National Championships, she later went to the Karolyi Ranch in New Waverly, Texas, to participate in both selection camps for the 2011 World Championships team. She was subsequently named to the team for the 2011 Pan American Games. She competed only on the uneven bars and floor exercise, and scored in the thirteens on both apparatus. She failed to qualify for either of the event finals, but on uneven bars it was due to the "two [athletes] per country" rule (Bridgette Caquatto and Shawn Johnson both scored higher than her).

=== 2012 ===
As a result of Sloan's injuries and her participation in the Pan American Games the previous year, she was able to successfully petition for a spot at the 2012 National Championships. She had intended to compete at the U.S. Classic, but decided not to out of respect for her coach, who would have been unable to attend because he was at his father's funeral. At the championships, she performed in all four events for the first time since 2009, coming sixth on the uneven bars and tenth in the all-around. She was chosen to compete at the Olympic Trials, but on the first night of the Trials, she injured her elbow during bars warmup and was forced to withdraw, ending her chances at the London Olympic Games and her national team career.

== NCAA career ==
Sloan accepted an athletic scholarship to attend the University of Florida in Gainesville, where she was a member of the Florida Gators women's gymnastics team, then under the leadership of Rhonda Faehn. Bridget deferred enrollment until the 2012 fall semester, which allowed her to seek a second consecutive spot on the U.S. Olympic team for the 2012 Summer Olympics. Due to injury, Sloan was forced to withdraw from the 2012 U.S. Olympic Trials, and rejoined 2010 World Championship teammate Mackenzie Caquatto on the Florida Gators team.

In 2013, at her first NCAA Championship with the Gators, Sloan captured the all-around title with a score of 39.600. She then led her team to their first NCAA Championship title, scoring 39.75 all-around. In event finals, Bridget also won the beam title. Sloan is an eight-time All-American (first-team honors in all-around, uneven bars, balance beam and floor exercise at the NCAA Championship; first-team honors for all-around, uneven bars and balance beam, and second-team in vault in the first National Association of Collegiate Gymnastics Coaches (NACGC) All-America regular-season awards). After the season, Sloan was named as the 2013 recipient of the Honda Sports Award, recognizing her as the outstanding women's college gymnast. She was only the fourth freshman to win in the award's 37-year history, and the second consecutive Florida freshman to win the award.

2014 was Sloan's second season with the Gators, who won their second consecutive NCAA National Championships as a team. Individually, Sloan was the NCAA National Champion on the uneven bars, was a first-team All-American on vault and bars and second team All-American on floor. She was named NACGC Southeast Region Gymnast of the Year and earned NACGC first team All-American status on all four events.

In the first meet of the 2015 season, against Ball State on January 11, 2015, Sloan was named the SEC Specialist of the Week for her 10.0 score on vault. However, she also injured her ankle and was sidelined for five meets. She returned to competition toward the end of the regular season. She was a member of the Gators team as they won their third consecutive NCAA National Championships title, and individually placed second on vault and uneven bars, earning first team All-American honors. Sloan also placed sixth in the all-around. She has become the first gymnast from Florida to achieve perfect 10.0 scores on all four events, and is only the seventh NCAA gymnast ever to achieve the feat.

Sloan earned her second NCAA All-Around title in her final year at Florida in 2016, also winning the beam and uneven bars.

== Routines and skills ==
=== Elite (2008) ===
- Vault: Double-twisting laid-out Yurchenko — 5.8 difficulty
- Uneven bars: Glide kip, cast to handstand (KCH) + toe-on to handstand 1/2 (C) + Endo 1/2 (C) + toe-on shoot to high bar (B); KCHS 1/2 + giant + stalder to handstand 1/1 (Frederick) (D) + straddled Tkatchev (D); KCHS + piked stalder (D) + toe-on Tkatchev (Ray) (E); KCHS + toe-on to handstand (C) + overshoot to handstand on low bar (D) + stalder shoot to high bar (Ray) (C); KCHS + giant + giant + full-twisting double layout dismount (E) — 6.7 difficulty
- Balance beam: Press to handstand to clear pike support mount (C); front aerial walkover (D) + aerial cartwheel (D); full turn with leg at horizontal (C); front tuck (D); back handspring step-out (B) + layout step-out (C); switch split leap (C) + back tuck (C) + sheep jump (D); free walkover to arabesque (D); split jump (A) + wolf jump (A); round-off (B) + double pike dismount (E) — 6.5 difficulty
- Floor exercise: Round-off + back layout 3/2 (C) to round-off + back handspring + back layout 3/1 (E); round-off + back handspring + piked full-in (E); switch split ring leap (C) + split leap 1/1 (C); front handspring + front layout 2/1 (Tarasevich) (D); triple spin with leg below horizontal (C); round-off + back layout 2/1 (C); straddle jump 1/1 (Popa) (C); round-off + back handspring + double pike (D) — 6.3 difficulty

=== Elite (2009) ===
- Vault: Double-twisting laid-out Yurchenko — 5.8 difficulty
- Uneven bars: Glide KCHS + toe-on to handstand 1/2 (C) + Endo 1/2 (C) + toe-on Shaposhnikova (Maloney) (D); KCHS + toe-on to handstand 1/1 (Hoefnagel) (D) + straddled Tkatchev (D); KCHS + toe-on piked Tkatchev (Church) (E); KCHS + toe-on to handstand (C) + overshoot to handstand on low bar (D) + stalder shoot up to high bar (Ray) (C); KCHS + giant + giant + full-twisting double layout dismount (E) — 5.9 difficulty
- Balance beam: Stoop through to clear pike support (B); split leap 1/1 (D); front tuck (D) + back handspring step-out (B) + layout step-out (C); full turn with leg at horizontal (C) + full turn (A); split jump (A) + wolf jump (A); front aerial walkover (D) + aerial cartwheel (D); switch split leap (C) + back tuck (C); round-off (B) + double pike dismount (E) — 6.1 difficulty
- Floor exercise: Round-off + back layout 3/2 (C) to round-off + back handspring + back layout 3/1 (E); round-off + back handspring + piked full-in (E); switch split leap (B) + split leap 1/1 (C); front handspring + front layout 5/2 (Randi) (D); triple turn with leg below horizontal (C); double turn with leg at horizontal (D); round-off + back handspring + double pike (D) — 5.9 difficulty

=== Elite (2010) ===
- Uneven bars: Jump to hang on high bar; KCHS + toe-on piked Tkatchev (Church) (E) + Pak salto (D); KCHS + toe-on to handstand 1/2 (C) + forward toe-on to handstand 1/2 (C) + toe-on Shaposhnikova (Maloney) (D) + overshoot to handstand on low bar (D) + stalder shoot up to high bar (Ray) (C); KCHS + toe-on to handstand 1/1 (Hoefnagel) (D) + double layout dismount (D) — 6.1 difficulty
- Balance beam: Stoop through to clear pike support (B); split leap 1/1 (D); split leap (A) + split jump (A); front aerial walkover (D) + back handspring step-out (B) + layout step-out (C); full turn with leg at horizontal (C); aerial cartwheel (D); front tuck (D); switch split leap (C) + back tuck (C); round-off (B) + double pike dismount (D) — 5.8 difficulty
- Floor exercise: Round-off + back layout 3/2 (C) to round-off + back handspring + back layout 3/1 (E); round-off + back handspring + piked full-in (E); full turn with leg at horizontal (B); switch split leap (B) + split leap 1/1 (C); front handspring + front layout 2/1 (Tarasevich) (D); triple turn with leg below horizontal (C); round-off + back handspring + double pike (D) — 5.6 difficulty

=== Elite (2012) ===
- Vault: Full-twisting laid-out Yurchenko — 5.0 difficulty
- Uneven bars: Jump to hang on high bar; KCHS + toe-on to handstand 1/1 (Hoefnagel) (D) + piked Tkatchev (E); KCHS + toe-on piked Tkatchev (Church) (E) + Pak salto (D); KCHS + toe-on to handstand 1/2 (C) + forward toe-on to handstand 1/2 (C) + toe-on Shaposhnikova (Maloney) (D) + overshoot to handstand on low bar (D) + stalder shoot up to high bar (Ray) (C); KCHS + giant + giant + double layout dismount (D) — 6.4 difficulty

=== NCAA (2014) ===
- Vault: Full-twisting laid-out Yurchenko
- Uneven bars: Jump to hang on high bar; KCHS + Ray II; KCHS + toe-on + bail to handstand on low bar + toe-on to HB; KCHS + giant + giant + double layout dismount
- Balance beam: Stoop through to clear support; back handspring + layout step-out; front aerial to scale; switch leap + split leap; full turn; side aerial; round-off, layout 2/1 dismount
- Floor exercise: Front handspring + front layout 2/1 (Tarasevich); split leap 1/2 + straddle jump; back handspring, back handspring, double pike; round-off, back layout 3/2; front layout

== Competitive history ==
Junior level
| Year | Event | Team | AA | VT | UB | BB | FX |
|---|---|---|---|---|---|---|---|
| 2003 | U.S. Challenge | | 5 | | 2nd place, silver medalist(s) | | |
| 2005 | U.S. National Championships | | 14 | | 9 | | |
| 2006 | International Gymnix | | 2nd place, silver medalist(s) | 3rd place, bronze medalist(s) | | 2nd place, silver medalist(s) | |
| 2006 | U.S. National Championships | | | 4 | 4 | 3rd place, bronze medalist(s) | |

Senior level
| Year | Event | Team | AA | VT | UB | BB | FX |
|---|---|---|---|---|---|---|---|
| 2007 | Houston International | | 3rd place, bronze medalist(s) | | | | |
| 2007 | USA-Great Britain Friendly | 1st place, gold medalist(s) | 6 | | | | 3rd place, bronze medalist(s) |
| 2007 | U.S. Classic | | 1st place, gold medalist(s) | 3rd place, bronze medalist(s) | 2nd place, silver medalist(s) | 3rd place, bronze medalist(s) | 3rd place, bronze medalist(s) |
| 2007 | U.S. National Championships | | 5 | | 5 | 10 | 2nd place, silver medalist(s) |
| 2007 | Good Luck Beijing Int'l | | 3rd place, bronze medalist(s) | | 7 | 4 | 2nd place, silver medalist(s) |
| 2007 | Toyota Cup | | | | 3rd place, bronze medalist(s) | | 3rd place, bronze medalist(s) |
| 2008 | Italy-Spain-Poland-USA Friendly | 1st place, gold medalist(s) | | | | | |
| 2008 | U.S. National Championships | | | | 3rd place, bronze medalist(s) | 7 | |
| 2008 | U.S. Olympic Trials | | | | 8 | 12 | 14 |
| 2008 | Olympic Games | 2nd place, silver medalist(s) | | | | | |
| 2009 | American Cup | | 2nd place, silver medalist(s) | | | | |
| 2009 | USA-Germany Friendly | 1st place, gold medalist(s) | | | | | |
| 2009 | USA-France Friendly | 1st place, gold medalist(s) | | | | | |
| 2009 | U.S. National Championships | | 1st place, gold medalist(s) | | 1st place, gold medalist(s) | 5 | 1st place, gold medalist(s) |
| 2009 | World Championships | | 1st place, gold medalist(s) | | 6 | | |
| 2010 | Pacific Rim Championships | 1st place, gold medalist(s) | | | | | |
| 2010 | U.S. Classic | | | | 4 | 2nd place, silver medalist(s) | |
| 2010 | World Championships | 2nd place, silver medalist(s) | | | 4 | | |
2011
| 2011 | Pan American Games | 1st place, gold medalist(s) | | | | | |
| 2012 | U.S. National Championships | | 10 | | 6 | 15 | 13 |
| 2012 | Olympic Trials | | WD (Note: Sloan was injured during warm-ups and withdrew from the competition) | | | | |

NCAA
| Year | Event | Team | AA | VT | UB | BB | FX |
|---|---|---|---|---|---|---|---|
| 2013 | NCAA Championships | 1st place, gold medalist(s) | 1st place, gold medalist(s) | | | 1st place, gold medalist(s) | 4 |
| 2014 | NCAA Championships | 1st place, gold medalist(s) | | 6 | 6 | | |
| 2015 | NCAA Championships | 1st place, gold medalist(s) | 6 | 2nd place, silver medalist(s) | 2nd place, silver medalist(s) | | |
| 2016 | NCAA Championships | 4 | 1st place, gold medalist(s) | | 1st place, gold medalist(s) | 1st place, gold medalist(s) | 4 |

== Floor music ==
- Araba (2008–2009)
- Harem (2010–2011)
- Hup (2012)
- Till I Collapse (2013)
- Seven Nation Army (2014)
- Whirlwind by Spoll (2016)
