= Kennedy Baker =

American gymnast (born 1996)

- Nickname: Kenn
- Born: May 10, 1996 (age 30) Germantown, Tennessee

Gymnastics career
- Discipline: Women's artistic gymnastics
- Country represented: United States; (2010–14 (US))
- College team: Florida Gators (Class of 2018)
- Club: Texas Dreams Gymnastics
- Head coach: Kim Zmeskal
- Assistant coach: Chris Burdette
- Retired: June 12, 2018
Medal record
Representing Texas Dreams
U.S. Championships
| Gold medal – first place | 2009 Dallas | Bars (Junior) |
| Bronze medal – third place | 2011 Saint Paul | Bars (Junior) |
| Bronze medal – third place | 2013 Hartford | Beam |
Representing Florida Gators
NCAA Championships
| Gold medal – first place | 2015 Fort Worth | Team |
| Bronze medal – third place | 2017 St. Louis | Team |
| Bronze medal – third place | 2018 St. Louis | Team |

Kennedy Baker (born May 10, 1996) is an American retired collegiate and artistic gymnast. She competed as an elite gymnast from 2009 through 2013 and has since retired. She had competed in collegiate gymnastics for the Florida Gators.

== Career ==
=== 2009-11: Junior career ===
Baker began competing at the Elite level in 2009. She competed at the U.S. Classic and U.S. Championships that year and won the Bars competition in the Junior division of Nationals.

Baker returned for Nationals and placed sixth on beam; she earned a spot on the Junior National Team.

In 2011, she placed 7th at the VISA Championships and 3rd on Bars, and was again named to the Junior National Team.

=== 2012-14: Senior career ===
At Championships in 2012, she placed seventh on uneven bars and eighth in the all-around and on floor exercise. Since she placed in the top eight in the all-around, she automatically qualified to the Olympic Trials. At the Olympic Trials, she placed seventh on uneven bars and eighth in the all-around and on floor exercise, and was not named to the Olympic team.

In 2013, she came 7th in the all-around at Nationals.

In 2014, she announced her retirement from elite gymnastics. In February, she competed at the WOGA Classic as a Level 10 gymnast and won her session, qualifying to the Nastia Liukin Cup but withdrew from the competition.

== College career ==
=== 2015 ===
Baker began competing for the University of Florida team during the 2015 season. She competed in all but one meet, posting season high scores of 9.95 on the vault, 9.85 on the uneven bars, 9.925 on the balance beam, and 9.975 on the floor exercise. She received the SEC Freshman of the Week honor four times.

At the NCAA Gymnastics Championships, Baker helped her team advance to the Super Six Final, where she contributed scores of 9.9 on vault, 9.85 on uneven bars, and 9.925 on floor exercise to help the Gators win the title. Baker earned All-America First Team Honors on the floor exercise and also advanced to the individual floor exercise final, where she placed 12th with a score of 9.775. Following the conclusion of the season she was named SEC Co-Freshman of the Year along with the University of Arkansas' Paige Zaziski.

=== 2016 ===
Baker competed in every meet of the 2016 season. On January 29, she scored her first perfect 10 on floor exercise against the University of Alabama. At the SEC Championships she won the all-around title with a score of 39.65 and also won the vault title with a season high of 9.95.

At the Super Six Finals of the NCAA Gymnastics Championships, Baker posted scores of 9.9 on the vault, 9.85 on the uneven bars, 9.8125 on the balance beam, and 9.9 on the floor exercise to contribute to the Gators' 4th-place finish. She earned first team All-America honors on vault and floor exercise and second team honors on uneven bars and in the all-around.

=== 2017 ===
Baker again competed in every meet of the 2017 season, although for much of the season she was limited to bars and beam due to an ankle injury. She posted a career high of 9.9 on the uneven bars and matched her career high of 9.925 on the balance beam. She earned SEC Specialist of the Week honors after scoring her second career perfect 10 on the floor exercise against Auburn University. At the SEC championships, she won the floor exercise title with a score of 9.95.

At the Super Six Finals of the NCAA Gymnastics Championships, Baker contributed scores of 9.9 on vault, 9.8875 on uneven bars, 9.85 on balance beam, and 9.925 on the floor exercise to the Gators' 3rd-place finish. She earned All-America second team honors on the floor exercise.

=== 2018 ===
Baker earned SEC Specialist of the Week honors after scoring her third career perfect 10 on the floor exercise against the University of Alabama.

On February 23, Baker ruptured her Achilles tendon while performing on floor exercise during a home meet against the University of Arkansas, ending her season and subsequently her gymnastics career.

== Personal life ==
Baker lives in Flower Mound, Texas with parents Stephen and Brenda. Kennedy attended Lakeland Christian Academy until graduation in 2014, when she moved to Florida to attend the University of Florida and compete for their college team.
