= Morgan Price =

American gymnast (born 2005)

- Born: June 28, 2005 (age 21) Lebanon, Tennessee, U.S.
- Height: 5 ft 4 in (163 cm)

Gymnastics career
- College team: Fisk (2023–2025); Arkansas Razorbacks (2026–present)
- Head coach: Jordyn Wieber (Arkansas)
- Former coach: Kim Zmeskal (Texas Dreams)

Morgan Price (born June 28, 2005) is an American artistic gymnast for University of Arkansas.

== Early life ==
Born in Lebanon, Tennessee, Price is the daughter of Chris, a former baseball player for a Kansas City Royals farm team who died in a motorcycle collision in 2009. Her mother, Marsha, was a cheerleader at Vanderbilt University.

Price took up gymnastics at age two, attending Overbrook Catholic School in Nashville during her younger years.

== Gymnastics career ==
In 2013, Price moved to Coppell, Texas, to train at Kim Zmeskal's Texas Dreams gymnastics academy. In 2021 and 2022, she competed in the Nastia Liukin Cup, once placing third on bars. She graduated from Coppell High School a year early in 2022.

A five-star college recruit, Price originally committed in November 2021 to compete in gymnastics on a full scholarship for the University of Arkansas (where her sister Frankie competed). She decommitted from Arkansas in May 2022 after she was invited by coach Corrinne Tarver to compete for Fisk University, a historically black school planning to become the first to launch a gymnastics program.

In Price's first year, the Fisk Lady Gymdogs held their first season. She was one of three Gymdogs to qualify for the 2023 USA Gymnastics Collegiate National Championships, where she placed third in floor exercise and eighth in all-around.

In April 2024, Price won the USA Gymnastics' 2024 Women's Collegiate National Championships, making her the first gymnast from a historically black college or university to win a USA Gymnastics national collegiate championship. Her all-around score was 39.225.

On February 8 2025, Price became the first HBCU gymnast to score a perfect 10 on uneven bars.

In February 2026, Price became the first Arkansas gymnast to score a perfect 10 doing so on Vault during a home meet.
