= 2013 NCAA women's gymnastics championships =

American college gymnastics competition

2013 NCAA Women's Gymnastics Championships
- Venue: Pauley Pavilion
- Location: Los Angeles, California
- Dates: April 19–21

Medalists
gold medal	Florida
silver medal	Oklahoma
bronze medal	Alabama

The 2013 NCAA Women's Gymnastics Championship was held in Pauley Pavilion, on the campus of UCLA in Los Angeles, California on April 19–21, 2013. The team competition was won by the Florida Gators. Twelve teams from the six regional meets advanced to the NCAA Division I national team and individual titles. The selection show announcing the regional pairings was held on Monday, March 25 at noon PT on NCAA.com.

== Regional Championships ==
Regional Championships were held on April 6, 2013 at the following six sites with start times between 4 and 6 p.m. local time:

- Columbus Regional (Ohio State, host) 6 p.m. – LSU (197.275), UCLA (196.950), Arizona (196.100), Ohio State (196.050), North Carolina St (195.275), Central Michigan (194.925)
- Corvallis Regional (Oregon State, host) 4 p.m. – Georgia (197.425), Arkansas (196.950), Arizona State (195.700), Oregon State (195.375), Boise State (195.300) and California (195.125)
- Gainesville Regional (Florida, host) 6 p.m. – Florida (198.40), Minnesota (197.10), Auburn (196.70), Maryland (195.575), Pittsburgh (194.775) and Bridgeport (194.225)
- Morgantown Regional (West Virginia, host) 6 p.m. – Michigan (196.725), Illinois (196.025), Nebraska, Kentucky, West Virginia, North Carolina
- Norman Regional (Oklahoma, host) 4 p.m. – Oklahoma (197.375), Stanford (196.800), Washington (195.925), Penn State (195.875), Iowa (194.475) and Southern Utah (194.850)
- Tuscaloosa Regional (Alabama, host) 6 p.m. – Alabama (197.400), Utah (196.400), Denver, Kent State, Brigham Young, Iowa State

== NCAA Women's Gymnastics Championship ==
The NCAA Women's Gymnastics Championship was held in Pauley Pavilion, Los Angeles, California, Friday, April 19, 2013:

- Afternoon session (12:00 pm PT) – Florida (197.775), LSU (197.325), Georgia (197.150), Minnesota (196.375), Illinois (195.700), Stanford (194.700)
- Evening session (6 pm PT) – Alabama (197.350), Oklahoma (197.200), UCLA (197.200), Michigan (196.850), Utah (196.200), Arkansas (196.150)

== NCAA Championship (Super Six Finals) ==
NCAA Championship (Super Six Finals): Los Angeles, California, Saturday, April 20 (4 p.m. PT) -

- Team - Florida (197.575), Oklahoma (197.375), Alabama (197.350), UCLA (197.100), LSU (197.050), Georgia (196.675)

== Individual Event Finals ==
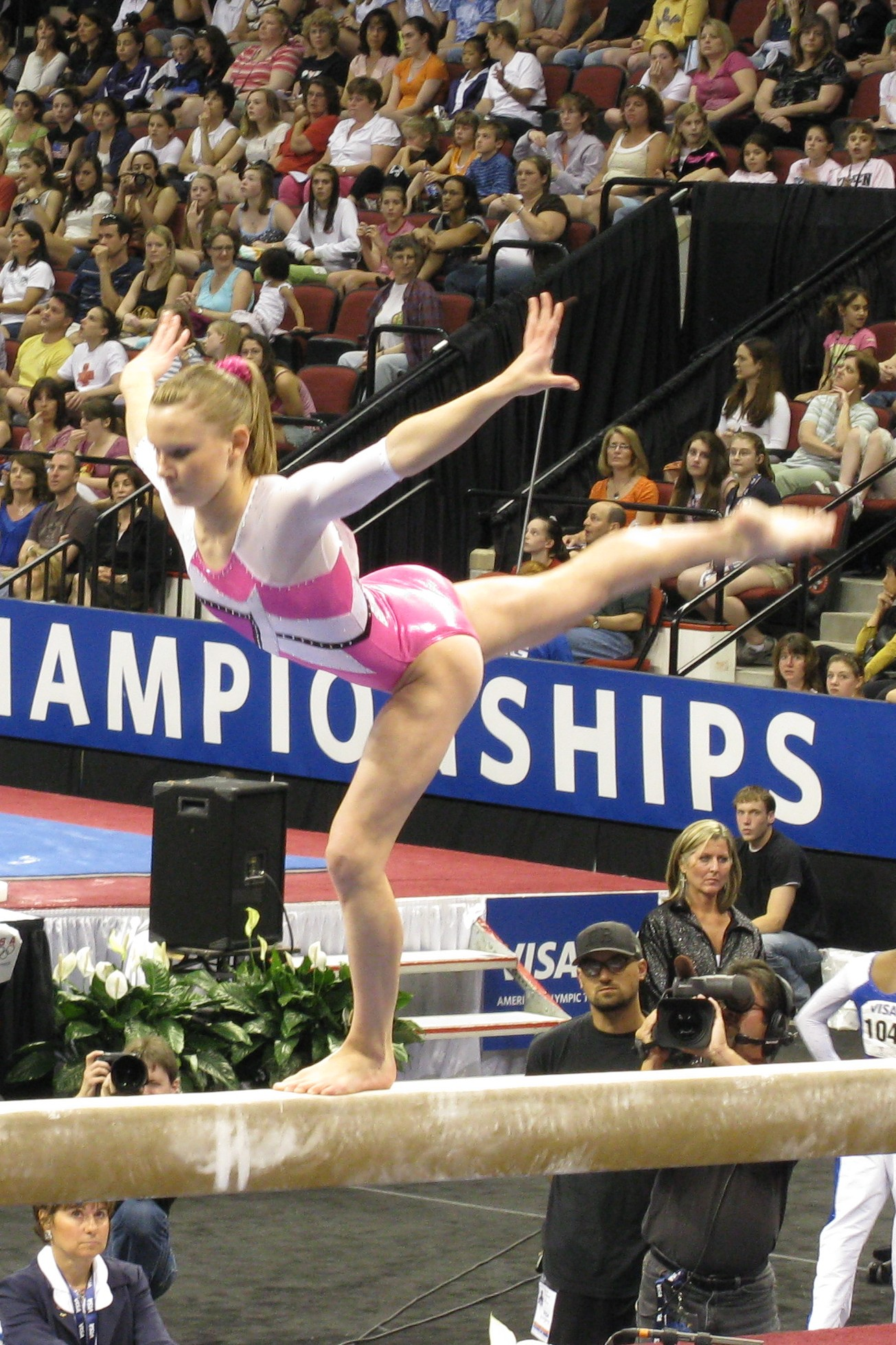
Bridget Sloan, Florida

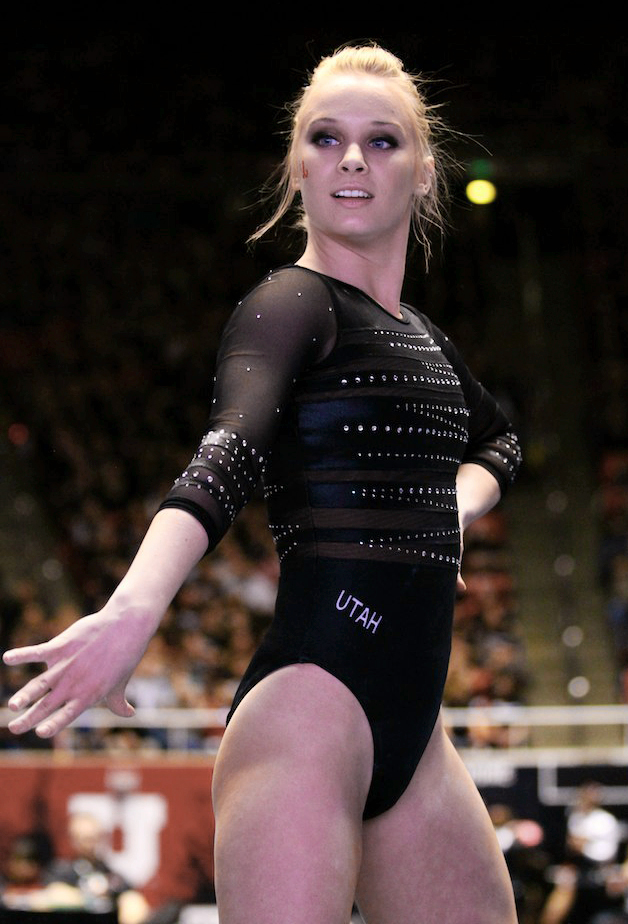
Georgia Dabritz, Utah

Individual Event Finals: Los Angeles, California, Sunday, April 21 (1 p.m. PT)

- Vault – 1st Diandra Milliner, Alabama & Rheagan Courville, LSU (9.9250); 3rd Olivia Courtney, UCLA (9.9167)
- Uneven Parallel Bars – 1st Alaina Johnson, Florida (9.9125); 2nd Bridget Sloan, Florida & Georgia Dabritz, Utah (9.9000)
- Balance Beam – 1st Bridget Sloan, Florida (9.9000); 2nd Hanna Nordquist, Minnesota & Katie Zurales, Michigan (9.8875)
- Floor Exercise – 1st Joanna Sampson, Michigan (9.9375); 2nd Diandra Milliner, Alabama (9.9250); 3rd Emily Wong, Nebraska (9.9125)
- All Around – Bridget Sloan, Florida, 39.600

== Champions ==
Event	Gold	Silver	Bronze
Team	Florida Gators; Bridgette Caquatto; Mackenzie Caquatto; Bianca Dancose-Giambattisto; Ashanee Dickerson; Kytra Hunter; Alaina Johnson; Marissa King; Jamie Shisler; Bridget Sloan; Rachel Spicer	Oklahoma Sooners; Lara Albright; Lauren Alexander; Erica Brewer; Rebecca Clark; Maile'ana Kanewa; Keeley Kmieciak; Madison Mooring; Brie Olson; Haley Scaman; Taylor Spears; Hayden Ward	Alabama Crimson Tide; Becca Alexin; Lauren Beers; Kaitlyn Clark; Sarah DeMeo; Lora Leigh Frost; Kim Jacob; Diandra Milliner; Ashley Priess; Ashley Sledge; Kayla Williams
Vault	Diandra Milliner (Alabama); Rheagan Courville (LSU)		Olivia Courtney (UCLA)
Uneven Bars	Alaina Johnson (Florida)	Bridget Sloan (Florida); Georgia Dabritz (Utah)	
Balance Beam	Bridget Sloan (Florida)	Katie Zurales (Michigan); Hanna Nordquist (Minnesota)	
Floor Exercise	Joanna Sampson (Michigan)	Diandra Milliner (Alabama)	Emily Wong (Nebraska)
