= Rusty Mitchell =

Rusty Mitchell may refer to:

== Sports ==
- Rusty Mitchell (gymnast) (1942–2023), American artistic gymnast
- Rusty Mitchell (racing driver) (born 1982), American racing driver
