= Alaina Johnson =

American artistic gymnast (born 1990)

- Born: October 2, 1990 (age 35)
- Height: 5 ft 1 in (155 cm)

Gymnastics career
- Discipline: Women's artistic gymnastics
- College team: Florida Gators
- Club: Texas East Gymnastics
- Former coaches: Martin Parsley, Stacy Parsley
Medal record
Women's gymnastics
Representing Florida Gators
NCAA Championships
Gold medal – first place	2013 Los Angeles	Team
Gold medal – first place	2013 Los Angeles	Uneven bars
Gold medal – first place	2014 Birmingham	Team
Silver medal – second place	2012 Duluth	Team
Silver medal – second place	2014 Birmingham	All-around

Alaina Johnson (born October 2, 1990) is an American artistic gymnast who was a member of the Florida Gators gymnastics team from 2011 to 2014.

== Senior career ==
Johnson trained at Texas East Gymnastics in Tyler, Texas. In 2008, she competed at the U.S. Classic and the U.S. Olympic Team Trials. In 2009, she competed at the CoverGirl Classic, where she finished fourth in uneven bars, and the Visa Championships, where she finished ninth in all-around, eighth in uneven bars, and eighth in floor exercise.

== College career ==
Johnson was a member of the Florida Gators gymnastics team. As a freshman in 2011, she was the SEC freshman of the year and was named to the All-SEC first team. She finished tied for fifth in floor exercise and tied for sixth in uneven bars at the NCAA Championships. The following year, she was named to the All-SEC first team again. At the NCAA Championships, she helped Florida finish second in the team competition, tied for fourth in all-around, and finished eighth in uneven bars.

At the 2013 NCAA Championships, Johnson helped the Gators win the team competition and became the first gymnast in team history to win the uneven bars title. In 2014, she was named to the All-SEC team for the third time. At that year's NCAA Championships, she helped Florida tie for first in the team competition, tied for second in all-around, and tied for sixth in uneven bars.
