= Ellen Berger =

East German artistic gymnast and coach

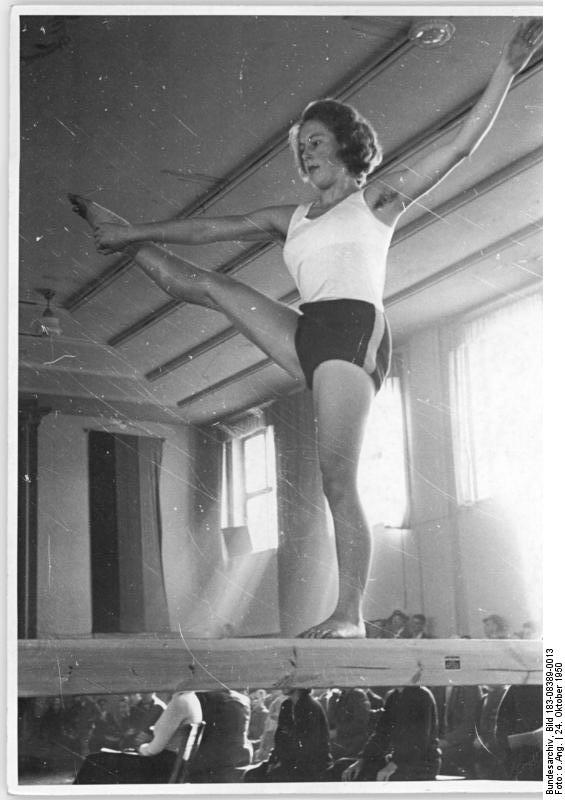
- Berger performing at the 1950 East German Championships
- Born: c. 1920–1921
- Died: 16 April 1997 (age 76)
- Occupations: Gymnastics coach; Gymnastics judge

Ellen Berger (1920/1921 – 16 April 1997) was an East German artistic gymnast, coach and International Gymnastics Federation (FIG) judge.

== Career ==
Berger began her career as an artistic gymnast in Leipzig, ending her active career in 1951. In 1953, she became the East Germany women's national artistic gymnastics team coach, a post she held until 1976. Among others, she coached world and Olympic champion Karin Büttner-Janz and world champion Erika Zuchold. In 1968, she was elected to the Technical Committee of the FIG, and became President of the Committee in 1976.

Berger is known for being associated with multiple controversial scoring instances at the Olympic Games. In the 1980 Games, she ruled that a British judge, Helen Thomas, had accidentally awarded Nadia Comaneci a 9.5 in the women's floor event instead of a 10 by pressing the wrong button. A British official denied this, stating the score had been changed following a Romanian team protest. Comaneci's 10 allowed her to win the joint gold. In the women's all-around, Berger entered Comaneci's balance beam score as a 9.85 after thirty minutes of debate, overruling the Romanian head beam judge, Maria Simionescu, who had refused to do so. This result put Comaneci into joint second place.

In 1988, Berger infamously deducted the United States half a point in the women's team event after alternate Rhonda Faehn had stayed on the podium during the compulsory uneven bars routine of Kelly Garrison-Steves, violating an obscure rule. The deduction sent the United States into fourth place behind East Germany, with United States coach Béla Károlyi claiming that it was politically motivated and accusing Berger of cheating. FIG President Yuri Titov upheld Berger's call. Former United States coach Don Peters speculated that Berger may have been seeking retaliation against Károlyi for an incident in the 1984 women's all-around event. Károlyi (then not a team coach) broke the rules by jumping the press barricade twice to greet Mary Lou Retton after a routine, but faced with a raucous American crowd, Berger backed down from imposing a penalty that would have cost Retton the gold.

Berger resigned from the FIG in 1992, and died in 1997 of a heart attack at the age of 76.
