= Jenny Rowland =

American artistic gymnast and coach

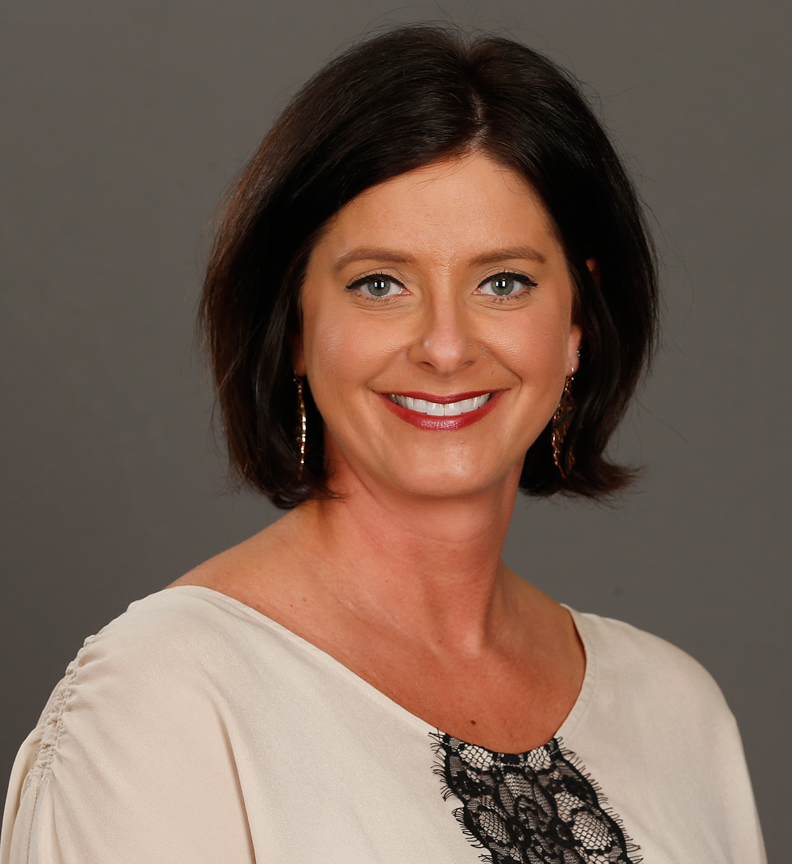
- Rowland in 2016

Current position
- Title: Head coach
- Team: Florida
- Conference: SEC

Biographical details
- Born: July 19, 1974 (age 52); Bedford, Texas
- Education: University of Oklahoma (BS)

Playing career
- 1992–1993: Arizona State

Coaching career (HC unless noted)
- 2000–2006: Oklahoma (asst.)
- 2010–2015: Auburn (asst.)
- 2015–present: Florida

Accomplishments and honors

Championships
- 4 SEC (2016, 2019, 2022, 2026)

Jennifer Annette Ester Rowland (born July 18, 1974) is an American gymnastics coach and former gymnast. Since 2015, she has been the head coach of the Florida Gators gymnastics program, succeeding Rhonda Faehn in 2015. Previously, she was with the Auburn Tigers and Oklahoma Sooners women's gymnastics teams.

== Early life and education ==
Ester was born in Bedford, Texas to Bonnie and George Ester. She was cast in sports drama movie American Anthem as Tracy Prescott; a young gymnast. She lived in Phoenix, Arizona for three months.

Ester started attending Arizona State University in the fall of 1993 and attended for one academic year. She then transferred to the University of Oklahoma and graduated in 1997 with a bachelor's degree in health and sports sciences.

== Career ==
=== Gymnastics ===
Jenny Ester
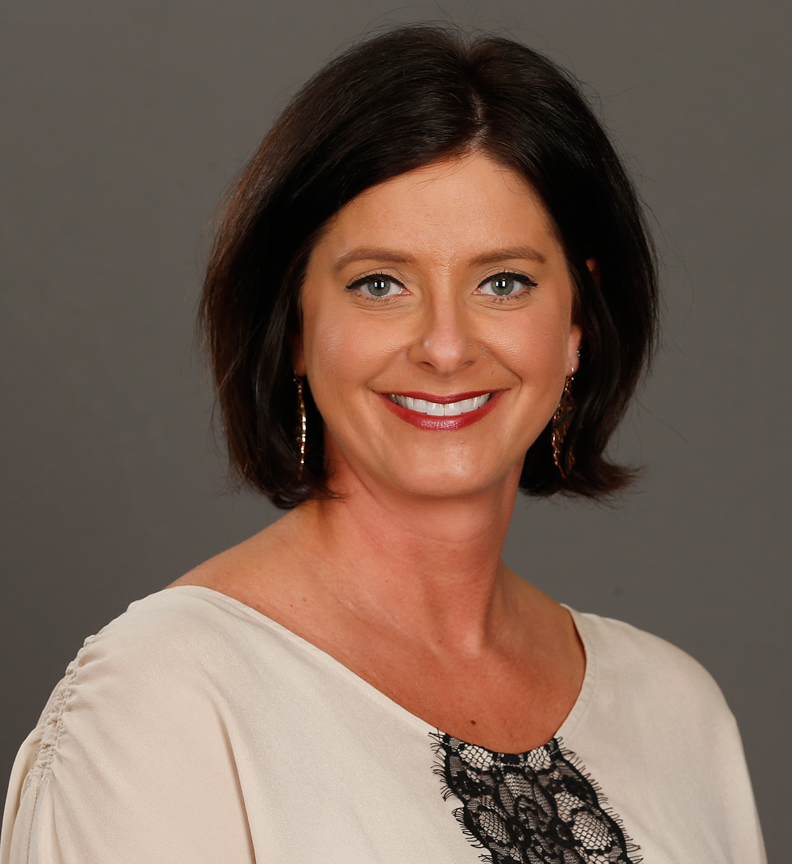

Gymnastics career
- Country represented: United States
- College team: Arizona State Sun Devils
- Club: LaFleur's
- Gym: Gymnastics Country USA
- Head coach: Kristy Krafft

Rowland began her gymnastics career at LaFleur's Gymnastics in Largo, Florida under the tutelage of Toni LaFleur. 1987 was her inaugural season as an elite gymnast, placing 13th at U.S. Nationals. In 1988, she moved to Oklahoma to train at Gymnastics Country USA under Kristy Krafft. She was the American Classic Champion and was fifth at Nationals.

She moved up to senior level in 1989. She took home a bronze medal at the American Classic and was fourth in the all-around at U.S. Nationals. She earned an invitation to the US Worlds Team Trials competition and placed seventh in all-around and was named a reserve. In 1990, she competed at the US Olympic Festival in Minneapolis but had a tough competition. Shortly after this competition, she sustained a serious back injury which required her vertebrae to be fused. She was sidelined for just under two years.

In 1992, she returned to competition but opted not to return to elite gymnastics. She returned to Level 9 and was preparing for collegiate gymnastics. She competed for the Arizona State Sun Devils for the 1993 and 1994 seasons. She was a 1993 All-American on uneven bars and the first ever Sun Devil to earn a perfect 10.0 score on that event.

=== Coaching ===
She started coaching competitive club gymnastics at Bart Conner Gymnastics Academy in Norman, Oklahoma in 1996 while studying at OU. At BCGA, she coached elite gymnast Angela Beam throughout her elite career. Jenny Rowland left Bart Conner's in 2000 after she'd been appointed assistant coach for the Oklahoma Sooners women's gymnastics team. Rowland left the program in 2006 and worked to get her elite brevet judging card. She served as a judge at both the 2008 and 2012 U.S. Olympic Trials.

On October 5, 2010, Rowland joined the Auburn Tigers women's gymnastics program as assistant coach. After two strong seasons with the Tigers, she was promoted to associate head coach. In 2015, she was named NCAA Co-Assistant Coach of the Year along with colleague Kurt Hettinger.

After the 2015 season, Rowland left the Auburn gymnastics program and became the head coach of the Florida Gators gymnastics program.

== Personal life ==
In August 1998, Rowland married Oklahoma Sooners gymnast Garon Rowland, an attorney. They have two daughters, Ella and Emmy.
