= Texas Dreams Gymnastics =

American gymnastics training facility

Coordinates: 32°56′20″N 96°59′48″W

- Founded: November 26, 2001; 24 years ago
- Based in: Coppell, TX
- Owner: Kim Zmeskal
- Website: texasdreams.com

Texas Dreams Gymnastics is a gymnastics training facility located in Coppell, Texas. It is owned by 1991 World champion and 1992 Olympics bronze medalist Kim Zmeskal.

== History ==
Texas Dreams was founded by Kim Zmeskal and her husband, Chris Burdette. It opened in 2001 and moved to a larger facility in 2013. By 2017, the gym also included three classrooms for children in grades one through eight to study.

== Abuse allegations ==
Zmeskal, who was trained by Béla Károlyi and Márta Károlyi, said of her approach to coaching, "Chris and I are not Martha and Bela. We don’t have their background, we don’t have their history. So the environment is lighter than what it was for me growing up."

However, multiple former Texas Dreams athletes, including Kennedy Baker, have alleged abuse during their time training at the facility. Baker and another gymnast, Ashton Kim, alleged that Burdette regularly made racist jokes in their presence, and Baker said that Kim once forcibly cut her hair before a competition.

== Notable Texas Dreams gymnasts ==
Gymnasts who have trained at Texas Dreams include:

- Emma Malabuyo, a 2024 Olympic gymnast competing for the Philippines
- Ragan Smith, a 2016 Olympic team alternate
- Sydney Barros, a 2019 Junior World Championships team bronze medalist
- Bailie Key, 2014 Pacific Rim all-around champion
- Chelsea Davis, 2007 Junior Pan American bronze medalist
- Kennedy Baker
- Peyton Ernst
- Lloimincia Hall
