= 2015 NCAA women's gymnastics tournament =

American college gymnastics competition

- Venue: Fort Worth Convention Center
- Location: Fort Worth, Texas
- Dates: April 17–19

Medalists
gold medal	Florida
silver medal	Utah
bronze medal	Oklahoma

The 2015 NCAA Women's Gymnastics Championship was held at the Fort Worth Convention Center in Fort Worth, Texas, on April 17–19, 2015. Gymnasts from the six regional meets advanced to the NCAA Division I national team and individual competitions. The team competition was won by Florida Gators for the third time in their program's history.

== Regional Championships ==
The NCAA Regional Championships were held on Saturday, April 4, 2015, at the following six sites;

Regional	Host	Winner	Runner-up
Ames Regional	Iowa State Cyclones	LSU Lady Tigers	Nebraska Cornhuskers
Auburn Regional	Auburn Tigers	Alabama Crimson Tide	Auburn Tigers
Berkeley Regional	California Golden Bears	Georgia Lady Bulldogs	Utah Lady Utes
Columbus Regional	Ohio State Buckeyes	UCLA Bruins	Michigan Wolverines
Morgantown Regional	West Virginia Mountaineers	Florida Gators	Stanford Cardinal
Norman Regional	Oklahoma Sooners	Oklahoma Sooners	Oregon State Beavers

== NCAA Women's Gymnastics Championship ==
=== Session One: Morning ===
Position	Team	Vault (gymnastics)	Uneven bars	Balance beam	Floor (gymnastics)	Total
1	Florida Gators	49.375	49.450	49.275	49.375	197.475
1	Utah Red Rocks	49.450	49.500	49.175	49.350	197.475
3	Stanford Cardinal	49.050	49.575	49.300	49.250	197.175
4	Michigan Wolverines	49.175	49.225	49.250	49.375	197.025
