= Rusty Mitchell (gymnast) =

American gymnast (1942–2023)

- Full name: Russell Duncan Mitchell
- Born: June 1, 1942 Phoenix, Arizona, U.S.
- Died: February 25, 2023 (aged 80) Albuquerque, New Mexico, U.S.
- Height: 170 cm (5 ft 7 in)

Gymnastics career
- Discipline: Men's artistic gymnastics
- Country represented: United States
- College team: Southern Illinois Salukis

Russell Duncan "Rusty" Mitchell (June 1, 1942 – February 25, 2023) was an American gymnast. He was a member of the United States men's national artistic gymnastics team. He competed in eight events at the 1964 Summer Olympics.

Mitchell died on February 25, 2023.
