= Rhonda Faehn =

American elite gymnast and coach

Biographical details
- Born: April 28, 1971 (age 55); Minneapolis, Minnesota, U.S.
- Education: University of California, Los Angeles

Playing career
- 1985–88: U.S. National Team
- 1990–92: UCLA

Coaching career (HC unless noted)
- 1993–1994: UCLA (Student asst.)
- 1997–1998: Maryland (asst.)
- 1999–2002: Nebraska (asst.)
- 2003–2015: Florida

Head coaching record
- Overall: 347–86–6 (.797)

Accomplishments and honors

Championships
- Southeastern Conference (2007, 2010, 2012, 2013); NCAA (2013, 2014, 2015)

Awards
- Second-team All-American (1992); First-team All-Pac-10 (1992); SEC Coach of the Year (2006, 2007, 2010, 2011, 2012, 2013)
Medal record
Women's gymnastics
Representing United States
Pan American Games
Gold medal – first place	1987 Indianapolis	Team
National Championships
Gold medal – first place	1987 Kansas City	Vault
Gold medal – first place	1988 Houston	Vault

Rhonda Faehn (born April 28, 1971) is an American college gymnastics coach and former college and elite gymnast. Faehn was the head coach of the Florida Gators women's gymnastics team of the University of Florida for thirteen seasons, from 2003 to 2015. As a gymnast, Faehn competed at the 1987 World Artistic Gymnastics Championships and was named as an alternate for the U.S team at the 1988 Olympic Games in Seoul, South Korea. Faehn also competed collegiately, earning a scholarship to UCLA, where she attended from 1990 to 1994. She is best known for leading the Florida Gators to twelve consecutive appearances in the National Collegiate Athletic Association (NCAA) Division I women's gymnastics tournament, and three consecutive NCAA championships in 2013, 2014 and 2015. Faehn left the University of Florida in 2015 to become the Senior Vice President of USA Gymnastics, the governing body of gymnastics in the United States. On May 17, 2018, USA Gymnastics parted ways with Faehn, who came under fire from survivors of former national team doctor Larry Nassar's abuse.

== Coaching career ==
After taking over the Florida program in 2003, Faehn established herself among the top tier of gymnastics coaches in the United States. She compiled a record of 347–86–6 as the head coach at the University of Florida. Her teams finished no lower than fourth in the Southeastern Conference (SEC), widely regarded as the toughest gymnastics conference in the country. In 2003 and 2004, Florida placed second in their NCAA regional. From 2005 to 2008, the Gators won four consecutive NCAA regional tournaments. During her thirteen seasons as the head coach of the Gators, Florida finished in the top ten NCAA gymnastics teams in the nation every year, never finishing lower than seventh at the NCAA championship. Faehn coached the Gators to their first-ever NCAA national championship in gymnastics in 2013, with a second NCAA title in 2014 as the Gators tied the Oklahoma Sooners women's gymnastics team in the NCAA Super Six finals, and a third NCAA title in 2015.

Prior to coaching at Florida, she coached at the University of Maryland from 1997 to 1998, and at the University of Nebraska–Lincoln from 1999 to 2002. She also served as a student-assistant at her alma mater, UCLA in 1993 and 1994.

After the fallout from the USA Gymnastics sex abuse scandal, she was briefly hired at the University of Michigan, but was fired shortly after due to backlash from alumni and some abuse survivors.

In 2019 for a short period of time, she coached at Waverley Gymnastics Centre in Melbourne, Australia, before returning to the United States for family reasons.

== USA Gymnastics career ==
On May 11, 2015, Faehn was hired as the Senior Vice President of the Women's Program at USA Gymnastics. Shortly after she was hired, she was informed by Sarah Jantzi of Twin City Twisters of a report of "uncomfortable" medical treatments administered by Larry Nassar on a national team athlete. According to her, she immediately reported this incident to Steve Penny, who informed her that he would contact law enforcement, but did not do so for another 5 weeks. This incident was one of the key events of the USA Gymnastics sex abuse scandal and her involvement is mentioned in 2020 documentary, Athlete A. She was dismissed from USA Gymnastics on May 18, 2018.

== Competitive career ==
During her elite career, Faehn was coached by Bela Karolyi at Karolyi's gym in Texas. She finished twelfth at the 1986 U.S. National Championships, but had her greatest achievements in 1987, when she finished sixth at the national championships, and won the individual national title on vault, scoring perfect 10s on her laid-out Yurchenko vaults in both the individual all-around competition and the vault event final. She competed at the 1987 World Championships as part of the U.S. national team, and had the highest placement for the American women in the all-around final, finishing 19th. In 1988, her last year as an elite senior, Faehn finished sixth at the U.S. Nationals, and defended her individual national title on vault.

She finished seventh at the 1988 Olympic Trials and was named the alternate to the U.S. Olympic Team. Although she never competed in the Olympic events, her presence led to a controversial ruling that cost the U.S. the bronze medal. As an alternate, Faehn remained on the podium after removing the springboard that Kelly Garrison-Steves used to mount the uneven bars. A Code of Points rule bans coaches from remaining on the podium as an athlete competes. Although Faehn was not a coach, the presiding judge, Ellen Berger – an East German – invoked the rule and penalized the Americans five-tenths of a point, causing them to finish fourth behind East Germany and knocking them out of medal contention.

== Personal life ==
Faehn was born on April 28, 1971, in Minneapolis, Minnesota. In June 2006, she married Jeremy Bayon, a French tennis player who was an assistant coach for the Florida Gators men's tennis program. The couple have two sons, Noah and Isaiah. The family resides in Indianapolis, Indiana.

== Honors ==
- NACGC Southeast Region Coach of the Year (2003, 2005, 2007, 2014)
- SEC Coach of the Year (2006, 2007, 2010, 2011, 2012, 2013)
- NACGC Southeast Region Coach of the Year
- NACGC Coach of the Year (2007)

== See also ==
- Florida Gators
- History of the University of Florida
- List of University of California, Los Angeles people
- University Athletic Association
