= Florida Gators women's gymnastics =

Women's gymnastics team of the University of Florida

- Founded: 1973
- University: University of Florida
- Head coach: Jenny Rowland (10th season)
- Conference: SEC
- Location: Gainesville, Florida
- Home arena: Exactech Arena at Stephen C. O'Connell Center (Capacity: 9,251)
- Nickname: Florida Gators
- Colors: Orange and blue

National championships
- 1982 (AIAW), 2013, 2014, (Note: Co-champions with Oklahoma) 2015

Four on the Floor appearances
- 2021, 2022, 2023, 2024, 2026

Super Six appearances
- 1983, 1984, 1985, 1987, 1988, 1991, 1994, 1997, 1998, 2001, 2004, 2006, 2007, 2008, 2009, 2010, 2012, 2013, 2014, 2015, 2016, 2017, 2018

NCAA Regional championships
- 1981 (AIAW), 1982 (AIAW); 1984, 1985, 1987, 1997, 2005, 2006, 2007, 2008, 2009, 2010, 2012, 2013, 2014, 2015, 2016, 2017, 2018, 2021, 2022, 2024, 2025, 2026

NCAA Tournament appearances
- 1982, 1983, 1984, 1985, 1986, 1987, 1988, 1989, 1990, 1991, 1992, 1993, 1994, 1995, 1996, 1997, 1998, 1999, 2001, 2002, 2003, 2004, 2005, 2006, 2007, 2008, 2009, 2010, 2011, 2012, 2013, 2014, 2015, 2016, 2017, 2018, 2019, 2021, 2022, 2023, 2024, 2025, 2026

Conference championships
- 1982, 1983, 1984, 1985, 1989, 2007, 2010, 2012, 2013, 2016, 2022, 2023, 2026

The Florida Gators women's gymnastics team represents the University of Florida in the sport of gymnastics. The team competes in Division I of the National Collegiate Athletic Association (NCAA) and the Southeastern Conference (SEC). The Gators host their home matches in the O'Connell Center on the university's Gainesville, Florida campus, and are currently led by head coach Jenny Rowland. The Gators women's gymnastics program has won six SEC regular season championships (2019-2024), thirteen SEC championship meets, and four national championships: the 1982 AIAW national tournament and the 2013, 2014, and 2015 NCAA championships.

== History ==
The University of Florida first fielded a women's varsity gymnastics team in the fall of 1973. Gymnastics was one of the first women's sports added at the University of Florida and achieved early success by winning the 1982 Association for Intercollegiate Athletics for Women (AIAW) championship (the AIAW was the governing body for women's college sports from 1971 to 1982). Since the NCAA assumed sponsorship for women's sports championships in 1982, Florida has advanced to the NCAA championships (top twelve) every year but one. The Gators have advanced to the "Super Six" finals of the NCAA championships nineteen times. Florida has finished twice as runner-up (1998 and 2012) and won NCAA championships in 2013, 2014, and 2015.

Ernestine Weaver was the head coach of the Gators gymnastics program from 1980 to 1992 and was responsible for much of the team's early success in AIAW, NCAA, and SEC competition. Under Weaver, the Gators won five SEC championships, the AIAW national championship in 1982, and appeared in thirteen consecutive NCAA championships; Gators gymnasts won five AIAW and NCAA individual national championships. Judi Markell succeeded Weaver as head coach in 1993 and her teams qualified for nine NCAA championships in ten seasons, including three Super Six appearances and a second-place finish in 1998; Markell's Gators won three individual national championships.

The Gators were coached by Rhonda Faehn from 2003 to 2015; they won four SEC championships and appeared in the NCAA championships every year, including ten Super Six appearances, a national runner-up performance in 2012, and three straight national championships from 2013 to 2015. The 2014 NCAA championship team scored the highest total ever at an NCAA championship with a 198.175. Faehn's Gators won nine individual national championships. Marissa King won the vault title in 2011, Kytra Hunter won the all-around and vault title in 2012 and the all-around and floor titles in 2015, Alaina Johnson won the uneven bars title in 2013, and Bridget Sloan won the all-around and balance beam titles in 2013 and the uneven bars title in 2014.

After Faehn's resignation following the 2015 national championship, Florida hired Auburn assistant Jenny Rowland to be the new head coach. In Jenny's first year as head coach she led the Gators to their 10th SEC title and fourth in seven years.

== Individual national champions ==
Thirteen Florida Gators gymnasts have won a total of thirty-two individual national college championships, including Ann Woods (1982 AIAW all-around, floor exercise, uneven bars), Lynn McDonnell (1982 AIAW balance beam), Maria Anz (1984 NCAA floor exercise), Susan Hines (1997 NCAA vault; 1998 NCAA vault), Betsy Hamm (1998 NCAA balance beam), Marissa King (2011 NCAA vault), Kytra Hunter (2012 NCAA all-around and vault title, 2015 all-around and floor title), Alaina Johnson (2013 NCAA bars), Bridget Sloan (2013 NCAA all-around, beam; 2014 NCAA bars; 2016 NCAA all-around, bars, and beam), Alex McMurtry (2017 NCAA all-around and bars; 2018 NCAA vault), Alicia Boren (2019 NCAA floor), Trinity Thomas (2022 NCAA all-around, floor exercise, and uneven bars), Leanne Wong (2024 NCAA bars), and Riley McCusker (2026 uneven bars).

== Roster ==
2027 Roster
Name	Height	Year	Hometown	Club
Alyssa Arana	5-2	SR	Miami, FL	Leyva Gymnastics Academy
Skye Blakely	5-4	JR	Frisco, TX	WOGA
Jayla Booker	5-5	SO	Coral Springs, FL	American Twisters
Taylor Clark	5-2	JR	Orange Park, FL	Florida Elite
Carsyn Coleman	5-2	FR	Corona, CA	Gymnastics Olympica
Kayla DiCello	5-4	SR	Boyds, MD	Hill's Gymnastics
Amelia Disidore	5-5	SO	Overland Park, KS	GAGE
Gabby Disidore	5-6	SR	Overland Park, KS	GAGE
Maddy Dorbin	5-2	SO	Lilburn, GA	Georgia Elite
Danie Ferris	5-5	SR	Palm Coast, FL	Florida Elite
Ella Fine	5-2	FR	Thomasville, NC	High Point Gymnastics
Kieryn Finnell	5-4	FR	Pittsford, NY	Rochester Gymnastics
Anya Pilgrim	5-5	JR	Germantown, MD	Hill's Gymnastics
Simone Rose	5-0	FR	Sammamish, WA	Pacific Reign
Jocelyn Sasson	5-0	SO	Clermont, FL	Brandy Johnson's

- Head coach: Jenny Rowland
- Associate head coach: Adrian Burde
- Assistant coach: Owen Field
- Assistant coach: Jeremy Miranda

== All-American selections ==
All-American selections through the 2012 season.

- Maria Anz (1984)
- Mackenzie Caquatto (2012)
- Amanda Castillo (2007, 2008)
- Ashanee Dickerson (2010, 2011*, 2012)
- Erinn Dooley (2003*, 2004, 2005*)
- Savannah Evans (2004*, 2006, 2007)
- Amy Ferguson (2012*)
- Courtney Gladys (2010*)
- Alicia Goodwin (2009, 2010*)
- Jaime Graziano (1997*)
- Kristin Guise (1993*, 1994, 1995, 1996)
- Betsy Hamm (1998)
- Corey Hartung (2006, 2007, 2008, 2009)
- Susan Hines (1996*, 1997, 1998)
- Kytra Hunter (2012)
- Alaina Johnson (2011, 2012*)
- Colleen Johnson (1993*)
- Janice Kerr (1988^)
- Breanne King (2004*, 2007*)
- Marissa King (2010, 2011, 2012)
- Samantha Lutz (2004, 2006*)
- Elizabeth Mahlich (2009*)
- Lana Marty (1982)
- Christina McDonald (1991)
- Lynn McDonnell (1981, 1982)
- Melissa Miller (1987, 1988, 1989)
- Lindsey Miner (2002, 2003)
- Tiffany Murry (2006*)
- Amy Myerson (1994, 1995)
- Lisa Panzironi (1994*)
- Ashley Reed (2007, 2008)
- Katie Rue (2004*)
- Elfi Schlegel (1983, 1984, 1985)
- Melanie Sinclair (2007, 2008, 2009)
- Maranda Smith (2009, 2010, 2011)
- Tammy Smith (1985)
- Sybil Stephenson (1995*, 1996*, 1997)
- Kristen Stucky (2003*)
- Orley Szmuch (2003*, 2004)
- Hilary Thompson (2001, 2002*)
- Pam Titus (1989, 1990, 1991)
- Chantelle Tousek (2004)
- Chrissy Van Fleet (1997, 1998, 1999*, 2000*)
- Chrissy Vogel (1995, 1996, 1997*)
- Kara Waterhouse (2001*)
- Nicola Willis (2008)
- Tracy Wilson (1990)
- Ann Woods (1980, 1981, 1982)
- Rebekah Zaiser (2010*)

Second-team All-American honors are designated with an asterisk (*). H. Boyd McWhorter Award winners (top SEC female scholar-athletes) are designated with a caret (^).

=== Regular season All-American Awards ===
The National Association of Collegiate Gymnastics Coaches (NAGCS) started awarding All-American honors for a gymnast's regular season performance. The top 8 gymnasts in each event and the all-around receive first team honors and gymnasts ranked 9 to 16 receive second team honors.

The score is based on the National Qualifying Score (NQS) in the RoadtoNationals.com rankings.

Year	Name	First Team	Second Team
2026	Skye Blakey	UB	BB
2026	Kayla DiCello	UB, BB	
2026	Selena Harris-Miranda	AA, V, UB, BB	
2026	Riley McCusker	UB	
2025	Leanne Wong	AA, UB	V, BB, FX
2025	Selena Harris-Miranda	AA, V, BB	
2024	Leanne Wong	UB	AA, BB
2024	Anya Pilgrim		AA, V
2023	Kayla DiCello		AA, UB, BB
2023	Trinity Thomas	AA, UB, FX	V, BB
2023	Leanne Wong	AA, UB	BB
2022	Nya Reed	FX	V
2022	Megan Skaggs	AA	
2022	Trinity Thomas	V, UB, BB, FX	
2022	Leanne Wong	UB	AA, BB, FX
2021	Trinity Thomas	AA, BB, FX, V	UB
2021	Alyssa Baumann		BB, FX
2021	Megan Skaggs		AA, UB
2021	Ellie Lazarri	BB	
2021	Nya Reed		FX
2021	Savannah Schoenherr		V
2021	Leah Clapper	BB	
2020	Trinity Thomas	AA, UB, BB, FX	V
2020	Rachel Gowey	BB	
2020	Savannah Schoenherr		UB
2020	Alyssa Baumann	FX	BB
2019	Trinity Thomas	AA, UB, FX	BB
2019	Alyssa Baumann		BB
2019	Alicia Boren		AA, FX
2019	Megan Skaggs		UB
2018	Alyssa Baumann		BB
2018	Alicia Boren		AA, BB, FX
2018	Rachel Gowey		BB
2018	Alex McMurtry	V, UB, BB	
2018	Rachel Slocum		V
2017	Kennedy Baker	FX	
2017	Alicia Boren	AA, V, FX	
2017	Amelia Hundley	UB	AA
2017	Alex McMurtry	V, UB	BB
2017	Rachel Slocum	V	
2016	Kennedy Baker	AA, V, FX	
2016	Alicia Boren		AA, V
2016	Bridgette Caquatto		UB
2016	Alex McMurtry	V, UB, BB	
2016	Bridget Sloan	AA, UB, BB, FX	V
2015	Kennedy Baker	FX	
2015	Claire Boyce		BB
2015	Bridgette Caquatto	UB	FX
2015	Kytra Hunter	AA, V, FX	
2015	Alex McMurtry	V	UB
2015	Bridget Sloan	UB	
2014	Mackenzie Caquatto	UB, BB	
2014	Kytra Hunter	AA, V, FX	
2014	Alaina Johnson	AA	UB
2014	Bridget Sloan	AA, V, UB, BB, FX	
2013	Mackenzie Caquatto	UB, BB	
2013	Ashanée Dickerson	V	AA
2013	Kytra Hunter	AA, V, FX	UB
2013	Marissa King		FX
2013	Bridget Sloan	AA, UB, BB	V

== Team Records ==
=== Top Team Total ===
Rank	Score	Meet	Year
1	198.775	NCAA Regional	2013
2	198.625	Kentucky	2025
3	198.575	Kentucky	2026
4	198.450	LSU	2026
5	198.425	NCAA Regional	2013
6	198.400	Auburn	2021
7	198.225	NCAA Regional	2025
8	198.175	SEC Championship	2026
9	198.150	Arkansas	2022
9	198.150	LSU	2021

=== Top Vault Total ===
Rank	Score	Meet	Year
1	49.700	Kentucky	2025
2	49.625	Auburn	2013
2	49.625	Mizzouri	2025
4	49.600	NCAA Regional	2013
5	49.575	Auburn	2012
5	49.575	NCAA Prelims	2012
7	49.550	NCAA Regional	2012
7	49.550	Kentucky	2013
6	49.550	LSU	2013
7	49.550	Auburn	2O21
7	49.550	LSU	2021
7	49.550	Arkansas	2022
7	49.550	LSU	2022

=== Top Uneven Bars Total ===
Rank	Score	Meet	Year
1	49.850	SEC Championship	2025
2	49.800	SEC Championship	2026
3	49.725	Kentucky	2019
3	49.725	Arkansas	2022
3	49.725	Kentucky	2026
6	49.700	Kentucky	2007
7	49.675	Minnesota	2013
7	49.675	URH, GWU & UW	2003
7	49.675	NCAA Regionals	2021

=== Top Balance Beam Total ===
Rank	Score	Meet	Year
1	49.800	TWU/Arizona St/Fisk	2026
1	49.800	Kentucky	2026
3	49.700	Auburn	2021
3	49.700	Arkansas	2022
3	49.700	Auburn	2025
3	49.700	LSU	2026
7	49.675	Kentucky	2021
7	49.675	Georgia	2024
9	49.650	LSU	2021
10	49.625	NCAA Regionals	2021
10	49.625	Missouri	2022

=== Top Floor Total ===
Rank	Score	Meet	Year
1	49.800	LSU	2022
2	49.750	NCAA Semifinal II	2022
2	49.750	LSU	2026
4	49.725	Super Six	2013
5	49.700	Minnesota	2013
6	49.650	Alabama	2013
6	49.650	NCAA Regional	2013
6	49.650	Oklahoma	2022
7	49.625	Auburn	2021
7	49.625	SEC Championships	2013

== Florida gymnasts at the Olympics ==
=== Olympians ===
Year	Country	Name	Medal(s)
1988	Canada	Christina McDonald	
2004	Great Britain	Nicola Willis	
2008	Great Britain	Marissa King	
2008	United States	Bridget Sloan	team

=== Alternates ===
Year	Country	Name
2020	United States	Kayla DiCello
2020	United States	Leanne Wong
2024	United States	Leanne Wong

== See also ==
- Florida Gators
- History of the University of Florida
- List of University of Florida Athletic Hall of Fame members
- List of University of Florida Olympians
- University Athletic Association
