= Kim Zmeskal =

American gymnast

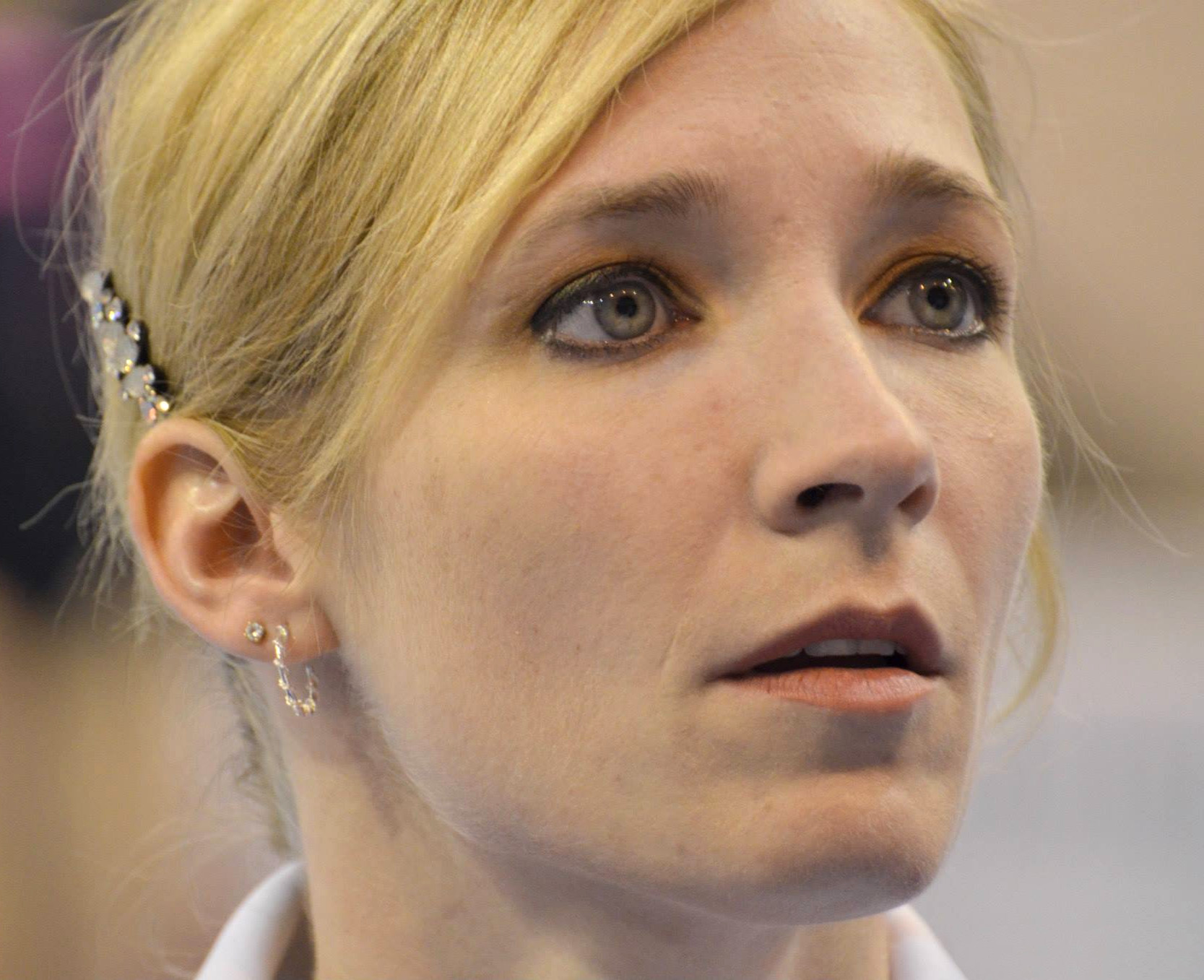
- Zmeskal in Jesolo in March 2014

Personal information
- Full name: Kimberly Lynn Zmeskal Burdette
- Nicknames: Kimbo; President of the Pumpkin Federation
- Born: February 6, 1976 (age 50) Houston, Texas, U.S.

Gymnastics career
- Discipline: Women's artistic gymnastics
- Country represented: United States; (1988–1993; 1998–2000)
- Club: Karolyi's Gymnastics, CGA; Texas Dreams (coach)
- Former coaches: Béla Károlyi, Mary Lee Tracy
- Choreographer: Geza Poszar
- Retired: January 28, 2000
Medal record
Event	1st	2nd	3rd
Olympic Games	0	0	1
World Championships	3	1	1
Goodwill Games	0	1	2
American Cup	2	1	0
Total	5	3	4
Event	1st	2nd	3rd
All-Around (OG/WC)	1	1	1
Uneven Bars (OG/WC)	0	0	0
Balance Beam (OG/WC)	1	0	0
Vault (OG/WC)	0	0	0
Floor Exercise (OG/WC)	1	0	1
Total	3	1	2
Women's artistic gymnastics
Representing United States
Olympic Games
Bronze medal – third place	1992 Barcelona	Team
World Championships
Gold medal – first place	1991 Indianapolis	All around
Gold medal – first place	1992 Paris	Balance beam
Gold medal – first place	1992 Paris	Floor exercise
Silver medal – second place	1991 Indianapolis	Team
Bronze medal – third place	1991 Indianapolis	Floor exercise
Goodwill Games
Silver medal – second place	1990 Seattle	Team
Bronze medal – third place	1990 Seattle	Uneven Bars
Bronze medal – third place	1990 Seattle	Floor Exercise
American Cup
Gold medal – first place	1990 Fairfax	All around
Gold medal – first place	1992 Orlando	All around
Silver medal – second place	1991 Orlando	All around

Kimberly Lynn Zmeskal Burdette (born February 6, 1976) is an American retired artistic gymnast turned gymnastics coach and the 1991 World All-Around champion. A member of the silver medal-winning U.S. team from the 1991 World Championships (the first team medal won by the U.S. women at a world championships), she was the first American woman to win the all-around title at the World Championships, as well as the first to win a world championship medal of any color in the all-around. A three-time United States national all-around champion (1990–92), Zmeskal was also the 1992 world champion on both balance beam and floor exercise, and was a member of the bronze medal-winning U.S. team at the 1992 Summer Olympic Games in Barcelona, Spain, the first U.S. team medal won at a fully attended Olympic Games. She also posted the highest optional all-around score in the qualification round in Barcelona.

Zmeskal is regarded as one of the greatest female gymnasts. Her all-around win sparked the beginning of a dynasty of American dominance in women's gymnastics (since 1992, seven American women have won world all-around titles, and 12 of the last 21 all-around world championship titles (including 10 of the last 14) were won by an American) and the reemergence of power and athleticism in the sport.

She coaches gymnastics and owns Texas Dreams Gymnastics in Coppell, Texas and annually hosts the Kim Zmeskal's Texas Prime Meet.

== Early life and training ==
Zmeskal was born in Houston, Texas, to Clarice and David Zmeskal. She has one younger sister, Melissa and one younger brother, Eric. From a young age, Zmeskal trained with coaching great Béla Károlyi, who had bought Sundance Gymnastics in Zmeskal's Houston neighborhood. This gave Zmeskal the opportunity to observe and interact with her heroine, Mary Lou Retton, who went on to win the Olympic all-around gold medal in 1984 when Zmeskal was eight. She attended Northland Christian School before graduating from Westfield High School like many of Károlyi's other top gymnasts to accommodate her training schedule, graduating in 1994.

In 1989, at the age of 13, Zmeskal became the U.S. Junior National Champion. She also took first place in the American Classic, the Swiss Cup Mixed Pairs (with Lance Ringnald), and the Arthur Gander Memorial. Zmeskal went on to become a three-time consecutive U.S. National Champion. In international events, she began a rivalry with the Soviet Union's Svetlana Boginskaya.

In 1990, Zmeskal won her first senior title in her debut at the American Cup. Later that year in Denver, she won her first U.S. Senior National All-Around title, more than four-tenths of a point ahead of her friend and training partner Betty Okino. She also won silver on bars (tied with two other gymnasts), balance beam, and floor exercise in the event finals.

Zmeskal was unable to defend her American Cup title, losing to Okino by a margin of just .225 points, but won the event finals for beam and floor. She then defended her U.S. National All-Around title in Cincinnati, where she also won the national title on floor alongside Dominique Dawes and placed second on beam. At the 1991 World Championships in Indianapolis, she helped the team win the silver medal, the first team medal for the American women in World Championship history, beating out the Romanians to finish second behind the Soviet Union. She scored a perfect 10.000 on the vault in the final rotation of the optional rounds, one of only two perfect 10's at the championships, and becoming the first (and only) American woman to ever score a perfect 10 at the World Championships. Zmeskal also became the first American to win the World all-around gold medal, posting scores of 9.962 on the vault, 9.937 on uneven bars, 9.962 on the beam, and 9.987 on the floor to defeat reigning world champion Svetlana Boginskaya with a total score of 39.848. She also won bronze on the floor and placed seventh on vault in the event finals.

== 1992 Barcelona Olympics ==
Having recently become world all-around champion, Americans had high hopes for Zmeskal and the U.S. team heading the Barcelona 1992 Olympic Games, with Zmeskal earning the cover of both Time and Newsweek magazines before the Games. Proving her all-around title wasn't a fluke, Zmeskal added two more World titles at the individual apparatus World Championships in Paris, winning gold on the balance beam and the floor exercise with upgraded routines and increased difficulty. At the U.S. National Championships in Columbus and the Olympic Trials in Baltimore, Zmeskal battled an emerging Shannon Miller, with Miller defeating Zmeskal at the Trials although Zmeskal earned the highest score at both events, in a controversial finish. Nonetheless, Zmeskal won her third consecutive U.S. National All-Around title, becoming the first female gymnast to ever win three consecutive national all-around championships, won national titles on beam and floor, and placed second on vault and uneven bars.

Despite being picked as the clear-cut favorite for the all-around title and multiple gold medals, Zmeskal's Olympics began poorly as she fell off the balance beam during her compulsory routine on the first night of competition. Although she rebounded with performances on the floor, vault, and bars, Zmeskal was in 32nd place after the compulsories and 5th on the American team, who were second behind the Unified Team after the compulsories. She further rebounded with scores of 9.900 on uneven bars, 9.912 on the beam, 9.925 on floor, and 9.950 on the vault during the finals of the team competition, moving Zmeskal into 12th place and into the all-around competition by finishing third among the American women. Her combined score of 39.687 for the night was the highest of any competitor. The American women won the bronze medal in the team competition behind the Unified Team and Romania with a total score of 394.704 points, their first ever team medal in a non-boycotted Olympic Games. She also qualified to the event finals on vault and floor exercise.

Although she earned enough points to compete in the all-around competition, Zmeskal faltered during her first event of the competition, floor exercise, stepping out of bounds on her last tumbling pass. She faltered again in the final rotation with a shaky beam routine and finished 10th in the all-around final. Zmeskal finished off the podium in event finals as well, placing 8th on the vault after sitting down her second vault, and 6th in the floor final (although many commentators and coaches alike felt that she should have at least tied for the bronze medal). It was later revealed that Zmeskal was suffering from a tibial stress fracture before and during the Olympics.

“I've learned that you don't have to win first place to win” is how Zmeskal reflected upon her Olympic experience, recognizing her performance during the Team Final (in which no individual medals were awarded) as her greatest athletic achievement- overcoming a sizeable score deficit due to a compulsory beam fall as well as an injured tibia to qualify to the 1992 Olympic All Around final. She also defined standing alongside her teammates on the medal stand to receive their Olympic bronze medals as contributing to that “win”.

== Comeback and retirement ==
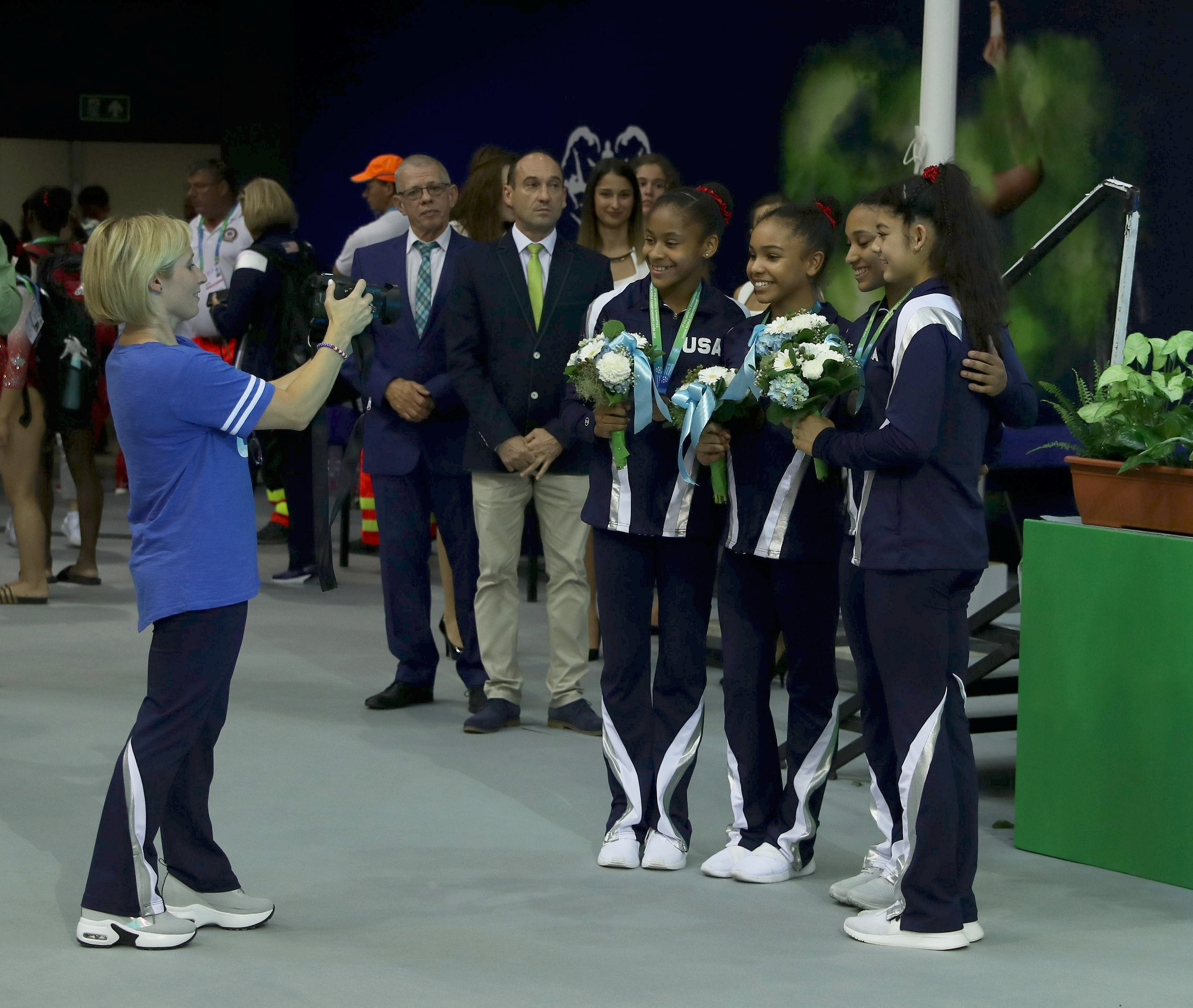
Zmeskal as a coach at the inaugural Junior World Championships

Any dreams for a comeback to compete in the 1996 Olympic Games were dashed after a slow recovery due to a torn anterior cruciate ligament (ACL) in her right knee suffered during a floor exercise exhibition in Worcester, MA.

In 1998, Zmeskal returned to competition with a decent showing at the U.S. National Championships in Indianapolis, finishing 11th all around. By 1999, she was even considered a possibility for the 2000 Olympics team after representing the U.S. internationally in her final competition in Shanghai, China in the fall of 1998. However, a ruptured right achilles tendon in July 1999, followed by a torn calf muscle in the same leg while taking off for a double tuck, ended her career in January 2000.

Zmeskal was inducted into the International Gymnastics Hall of Fame in May 2012.

== Personal life ==
Zmeskal married Chris Burdette on October 23, 1999. The marriage produced three children. Per Chris Burdette's Linkedin page, in June 2019, the couple split with Kim taking full ownership of Texas Dreams in March 2022.

== Abuse allegations ==
As the head coach of Texas Dream, Zmeskal has been criticized for her strict coaching style and verbal abuse towards her gymnasts. Former gymnast Kennedy Baker wrote about her experiences in an open letter,

Another gymnast who came forward was Ashton Kim, who also wrote a statement describing the hard training regime she was put under Zmeskal's tutelage and being forced to train with injuries. Kim stated that she got an apology from Zmeskal.

== Gymnastic trademarks ==
Zmeskal was recognized for her middle tumbling pass on floor which consisted of a round-off, three consecutive whip-backs, back-handspring, into a double-back in the tucked position (sometimes with four whips into double-back). Another trademark was the way she would flare her arms out during full-twisting elements, most notably on her full-twisting Yurchenko vault.

Another signature move was the reverse planche with one bent leg, which was her opening move on the balance beam, now seen in the Texas Dreams Gymnastics logo as well as gymnastics clip art.
