= USA Gymnastics National Championships =

The USA Gymnastics National Championships is the annual artistic gymnastics national competition held in the United States for elite-level competition. It is currently organized by USA Gymnastics, the governing body for gymnastics in the United States. The national championships have been held since 1963.

== History ==
=== 20th century ===
Before 1970, the Amateur Athletic Union (AAU) was the national governing body for gymnastics, so the national championships from 1963 to 1969 were run under the auspices of that organization.

The first USA Gymnastics national championships were held in Park Ridge, Illinois, in June 1963. Since then, the event has been held annually, usually over several days during the summer.

=== 21st century ===
In 2012, the top three finishers in the women's all-around were Jordyn Wieber, Gabby Douglas, and Aly Raisman. It was Wieber's second consecutive all-around title. In the individual events, Douglas won on uneven bars, Raisman won on balance beam and floor, and Sacramone won on vault. In the men's all-around, the top three finishers were John Orozco, Danell Leyva, and Sam Mikulak. It was Orozco's first all-around title. Leyva won on parallel bars and high bar, Jacob Dalton won on floor, Alexander Naddour won on pommel horse, Jonathan Horton won on rings, and Sean Senters won on vault.

In 2013, the top three finishers in the women's all-around were Simone Biles, Kyla Ross, and Brenna Dowell. In the individual events, Ross won on uneven bars and balance beam, and her Olympic teammate McKayla Maroney won on vault and floor exercise; Biles swept the silver medals in each event. In the men's all-around, the top three finishers were Sam Mikulak, Alexander Naddour, and Jacob Dalton.

In 2014, the top three finishers in the women's all-around were Simone Biles, Kyla Ross, and Maggie Nichols. It was Biles's second consecutive all-around title. In the individual events, Biles won on both vault and floor exercise, Ross won on balance beam, and Ashton Locklear won on uneven bars. In the men's all-around, the top three finishers were Sam Mikulak, John Orozco, and Jacob Dalton. It was Mikulak's second consecutive all-around title. In the individual events, Dalton won on floor exercise, Mikulak won on pommel horse, Brandon Wynn won on still rings, Donnell Whittenburg won on vault, Danell Leyva won on parallel bars, and Orozco won on high bar.

In 2015, the top three finishers in the women's all-around were Simone Biles, Maggie Nichols, and Aly Raisman. It was Biles's third consecutive all-around title, and she became the first female gymnast since Kim Zmeskal (1990, 1991, and 1992) to win the all-around 3 consecutive times. In the individual events, Biles won on both vault and balance beam, Madison Kocian won on uneven bars, and Raisman won on floor exercise. In the men's all-around, the top three finishers were Sam Mikulak, Donnell Whittenburg, and Chris Brooks. This was Mikulak's third consecutive all-around title, and he became the first male gymnast since Paul Hamm (2002, 2003, and 2004) to win the all-around 3 consecutive times. In the individual events, Steven Legendre won on floor exercise, Alex Naddour won on pommel horse, Whittenburg won on still rings, Mikulak won on both vault and parallel bars, and Brooks won on high bar.

In 2016, the top three finishers in the women's all-around were Simone Biles, Aly Raisman, and Laurie Hernandez. It was Biles's fourth consecutive all-around title, and she became the first female gymnast since Joan Moore-Gnat (1971–1974) to win the all-around 4 times consecutively. In the individual events, Biles won on vault, balance beam, and floor exercise, and Ashton Locklear won on uneven bars. In the men's all-around, the top three finishers were Sam Mikulak, Chris Brooks, and Jake Dalton. This was Mikulak's fourth consecutive all-around title, and he became the first male gymnast since Blaine Wilson (1996–1999) to win the all-around four times consecutively. In the individual events, Dalton won on floor exercise and vault, Eddie Penev won on pommel horse, Donnell Whittenburg won on rings, Brooks won on parallel bars, and Paul Ruggeri won on high bar.

== Records ==
The women's record, and overall record, of nine titles is held by Simone Biles, who won from 2013 to 2016, 2018 to 2019, 2021, and 2023 to 2024. The record for most men's all-around titles is held by Sam Mikulak, who won six competitions from 2013 to 2016 and 2018 to 2019. Blaine Wilson won five consecutive times from 1996 to 2000. Joan Moore Gnat and John Roethlisberger have both won four times. Kurt Thomas, Kim Zmeskal, Paul Hamm and Brody Malone each won three times. The record for most individual titles across all events is Simone Biles, with twenty. The record for most titles in one event is a tie between Alicia Sacramone, who won six women's vault competitions from 2005 to 2008, 2010, and 2012, and Simone Biles, who won six women's vault competitions from 2014 to 2016, 2018, 2019, and 2021.

== Championships ==
USA Gymnastics National Championships champions
Year	Date	Location	Women's Champion	Men's Champion
1963*	June 14–15	Park Ridge, Illinois	Donna Schanezer	Arthur Shurlock
1964*	June 17–18	University of Iowa	not held	Rusty Mitchell
1965*	April 16–17	Nashville, Tennessee	Gail Daley	Rusty Mitchell
1966*	April 15–16	Colorado Springs, Colorado	Donna Schanezer	Rusty Mitchell
1967*	April 13–15; April 28–29	Tucson, Arizona; Iowa City, Iowa	not held	Katsutoshi Kanzaki
1968	April 24–25	Memphis, Tennessee	Linda Scott	Yoshi Hayasaki
1969	April 25–26	Long Beach, California	Joyce Tanac	Steve Hug
1970	April 23–25	Las Vegas, Nevada	Cathy Rigby	Makoto Sakamoto
1971	November 18–20	University of Illinois	Joan Moore Gnat; Linda Metheny Mulvihill	Yoshi Takei
1972		Georgia Southern University	Joan Moore Gnat; Cathy Rigby McCoy	Yoshi Takei
1973	(W) May 4–6 (M) May 4–5	Seattle, Washington; Penn State University	Joan Moore Gnat	Marshall Avener
1974	(W) May 30–June 1 (M) May 10–11	Southern Illinois University; Berkeley, California	Joan Moore Gnat	John Crosby Jr.
1975	(W) May 22–24 (M) June 12–14	Eugene, Oregon; Southern Illinois University	Tammy Manville	Tom Beach; Bart Conner
1976	(W) April 8–10 (M) May 21–22	Allentown, Pennsylvania; Berkeley, California	Denise Cheshire; Robin Huebner	Kurt Thomas
1977	(W) April 21–23 (M) May 6–7	California State; Baton Rouge, Louisiana	Donna Turnbow	Kurt Thomas
1978	(W) May 4–6 (M) June 1–3	Uniondale, New York; UCLA	Kathy Johnson	Kurt Thomas
1979	May 18	Dayton, Ohio	Leslie Pyfer	Bart Conner
1980	April 19	University of Utah; Columbus, Ohio	Julianne McNamara	Peter Vidmar
1981	(W) May 12–14 (M) May 21–23	Lehigh University; University of Nebraska–Lincoln	Tracee Talavera	Jim Hartung
1982	(W) May 27–29 (M) June 3–5	University of Utah; Syracuse, New York	Tracee Talavera	Peter Vidmar
1983	June 3–8	Chicago, Illinois	Dianne Durham	Mitch Gaylord
1984	May 11–13	Evanston, Illinois	Mary Lou Retton	Mitch Gaylord
1985	June 6–9	Jacksonville, Florida	Sabrina Mar	Brian Babcock
1986	June 19–22	Indianapolis, Indiana	Jennifer Sey	Tim Daggett
1987	June 18–21	Kansas City, Missouri	Kristie Phillips	Scott Johnson
1988	July 7–10	Houston, Texas	Phoebe Mills	Dan Hayden
1989	July 6–9	Minneapolis, Minnesota	Brandy Johnson	Tim Ryan
1990	June 7–10	Denver, Colorado	Kim Zmeskal	John Roethlisberger
1991	June 6–9	Cincinnati, Ohio	Kim Zmeskal	Chris Waller
1992	May 14–17	Columbus, Ohio	Kim Zmeskal	John Roethlisberger
1993	August 25–28	Salt Lake City, Utah	Shannon Miller	John Roethlisberger
1994	August 24–27	Nashville, Tennessee	Dominique Dawes	Scott Keswick
1995	August 16–19	New Orleans, Louisiana	Dominique Moceanu	John Roethlisberger
1996	June 5–8	Knoxville, Tennessee	Shannon Miller	Blaine Wilson
1997	August 13–16	Denver, Colorado	Vanessa Atler; Kristy Powell	Blaine Wilson
1998	August 19–22	Indianapolis, Indiana	Kristen Maloney	Blaine Wilson
1999	August 25–28	Sacramento, California	Kristen Maloney	Blaine Wilson
2000	June 26–29	St. Louis, Missouri	Elise Ray	Blaine Wilson
2001	August 8–11	Philadelphia, Pennsylvania	Tasha Schwikert	Sean Townsend
2002	August 7–10	Cleveland, Ohio	Tasha Schwikert	Paul Hamm
2003	June 19–22	Milwaukee, Wisconsin	Courtney Kupets	Paul Hamm
2004	June 2–5	Nashville, Tennessee	Courtney Kupets; Carly Patterson	Paul Hamm
2005	August 10–13	Indianapolis, Indiana	Nastia Liukin	Todd Thornton
2006	August 16–19	Saint Paul, Minnesota	Nastia Liukin	Alexander Artemev
2007	August 15–18	San Jose, California	Shawn Johnson	David Durante
2008	(W) June 5–7 (M) May 22–24	Boston, Massachusetts; Houston, Texas	Shawn Johnson	David Sender
2009	August 12–15	Dallas, Texas	Bridget Sloan	Jonathan Horton
2010	August 11–14	Hartford, Connecticut	Rebecca Bross	Jonathan Horton
2011	August 17–20	Saint Paul, Minnesota	Jordyn Wieber	Danell Leyva
2012	June 7–10	St. Louis, Missouri	Jordyn Wieber	John Orozco
2013	August 15–18	Hartford, Connecticut	Simone Biles	Sam Mikulak
2014	August 21–24	Pittsburgh, Pennsylvania	Simone Biles	Sam Mikulak
2015	August 13–16	Indianapolis, Indiana	Simone Biles	Sam Mikulak
2016	(W) June 24–26 (M) June 3–5	St. Louis, Missouri; Hartford, Connecticut	Simone Biles	Sam Mikulak
2017	August 17–20	Anaheim, California	Ragan Smith	Yul Moldauer
2018	August 16–19	Boston, Massachusetts	Simone Biles	Sam Mikulak
2019	August 8–11	Kansas City, Missouri	Simone Biles	Sam Mikulak
~~2020~~	~~June 4–7~~	~~Fort Worth, Texas~~	Canceled due to the COVID-19 pandemic	
2021	June 3–6	Fort Worth, Texas	Simone Biles	Brody Malone
2022	August 18–21	Tampa, Florida	Konnor McClain	Brody Malone
2023	August 24–27	San Jose, California	Simone Biles	Asher Hong
2024	May 30–June 2	Fort Worth, Texas	Simone Biles	Brody Malone
2025	August 7–10	New Orleans, Louisiana	Hezly Rivera	Asher Hong
2026	August 6–9	Phoenix, Arizona	Hezly Rivera	Frederick Richard
2027	August 12–15	Tampa, Florida	TBD	TBD

*Unofficial national champion

== Gallery ==
Multi-time Women's National Champions

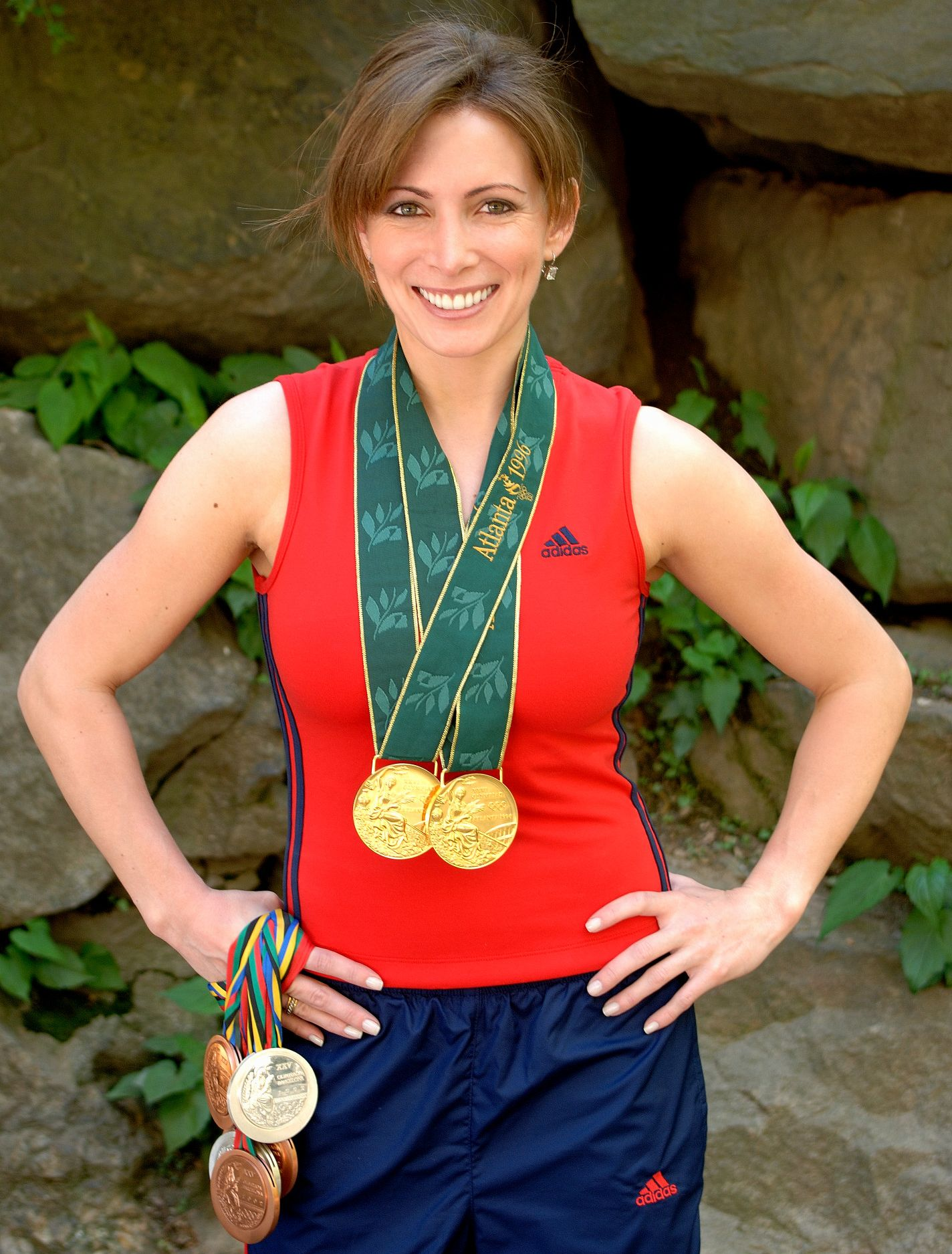
Shannon Miller
1993 & 1996

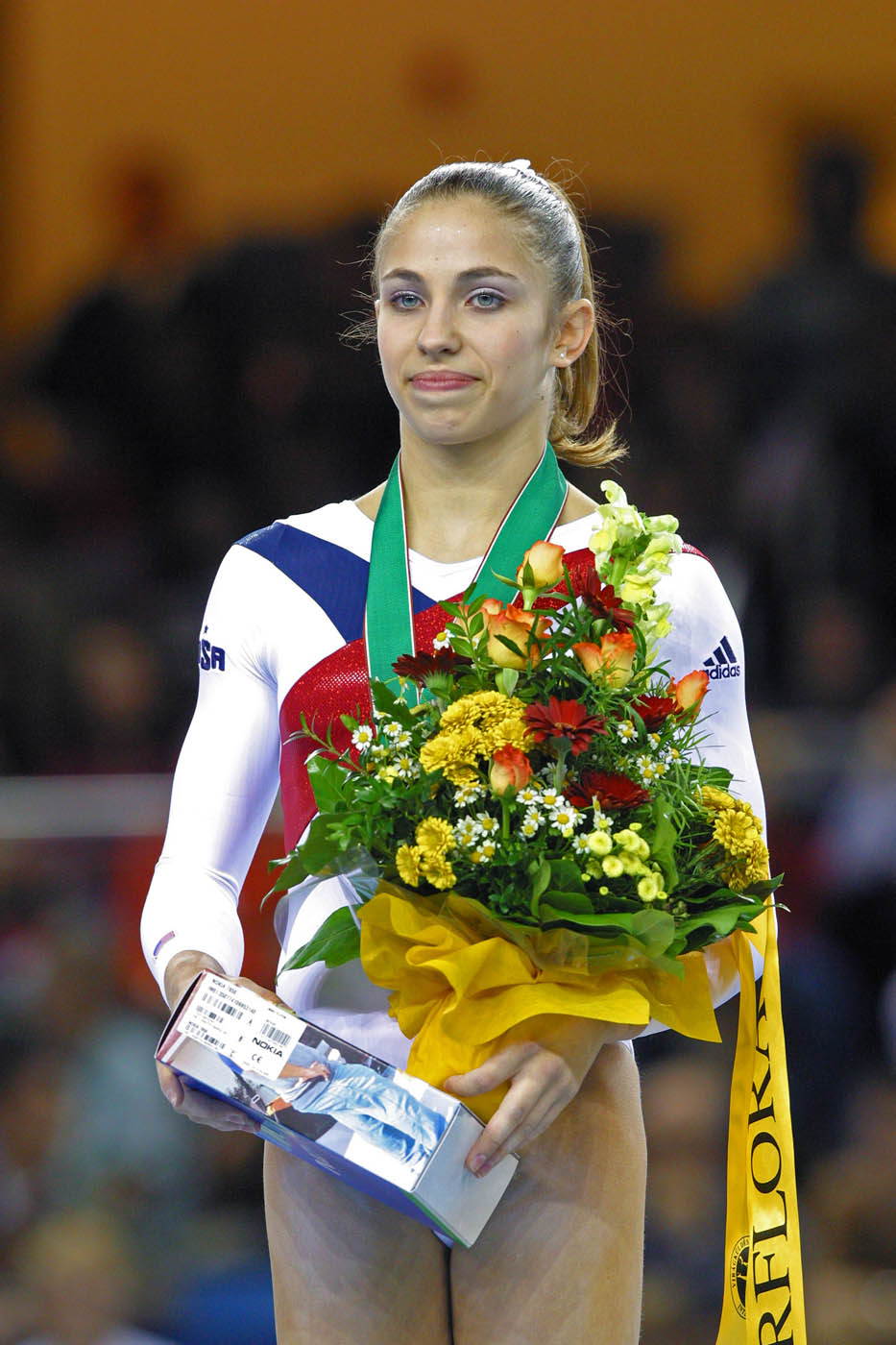
Courtney Kupets
2003 & 2004

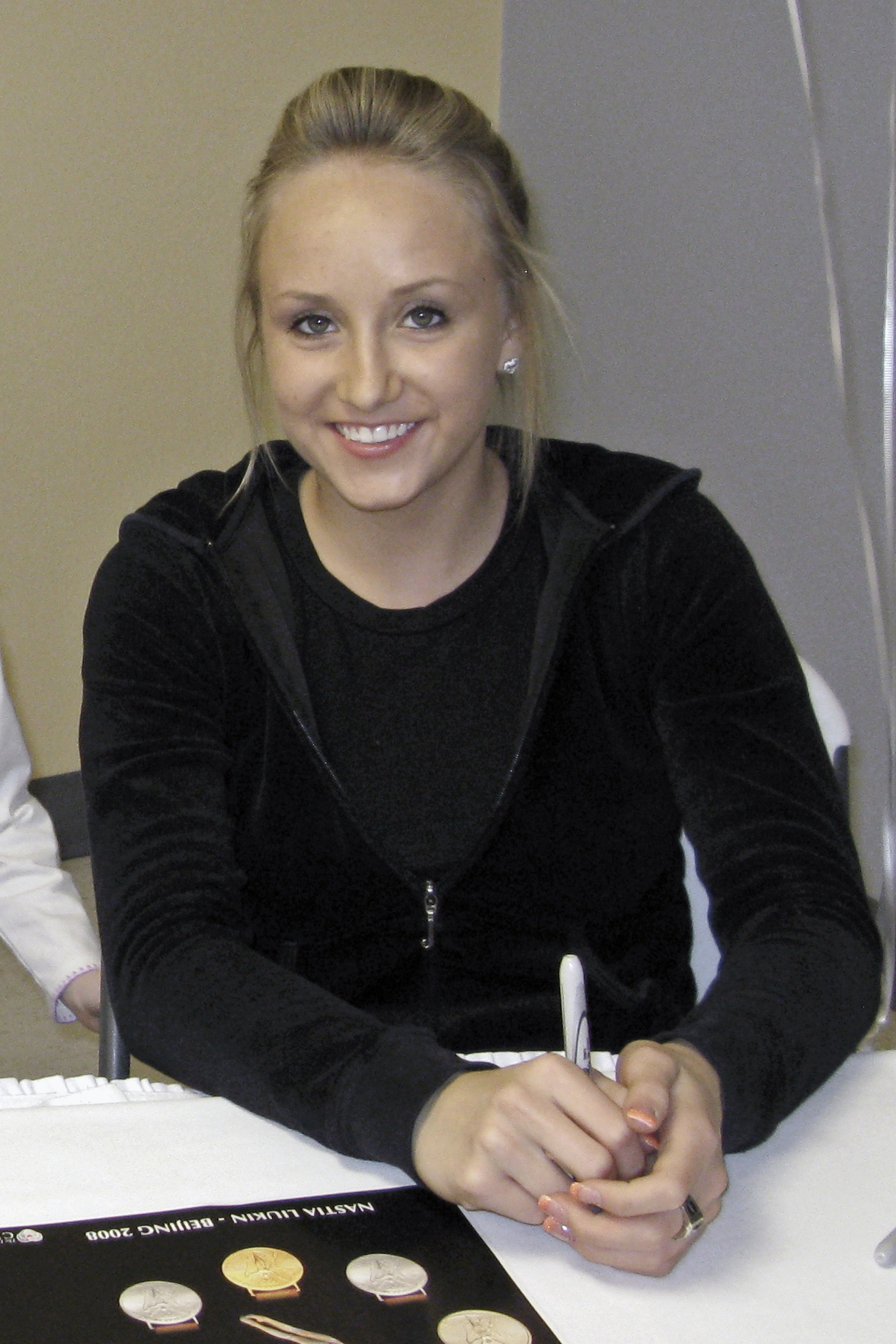
Nastia Liukin
2005 & 2006

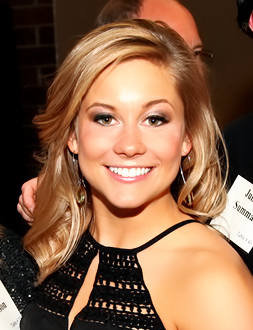
Shawn Johnson
2007 & 2008

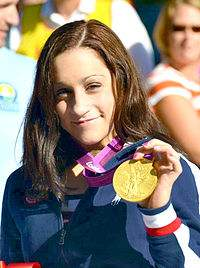
Jordyn Wieber
2011 & 2012

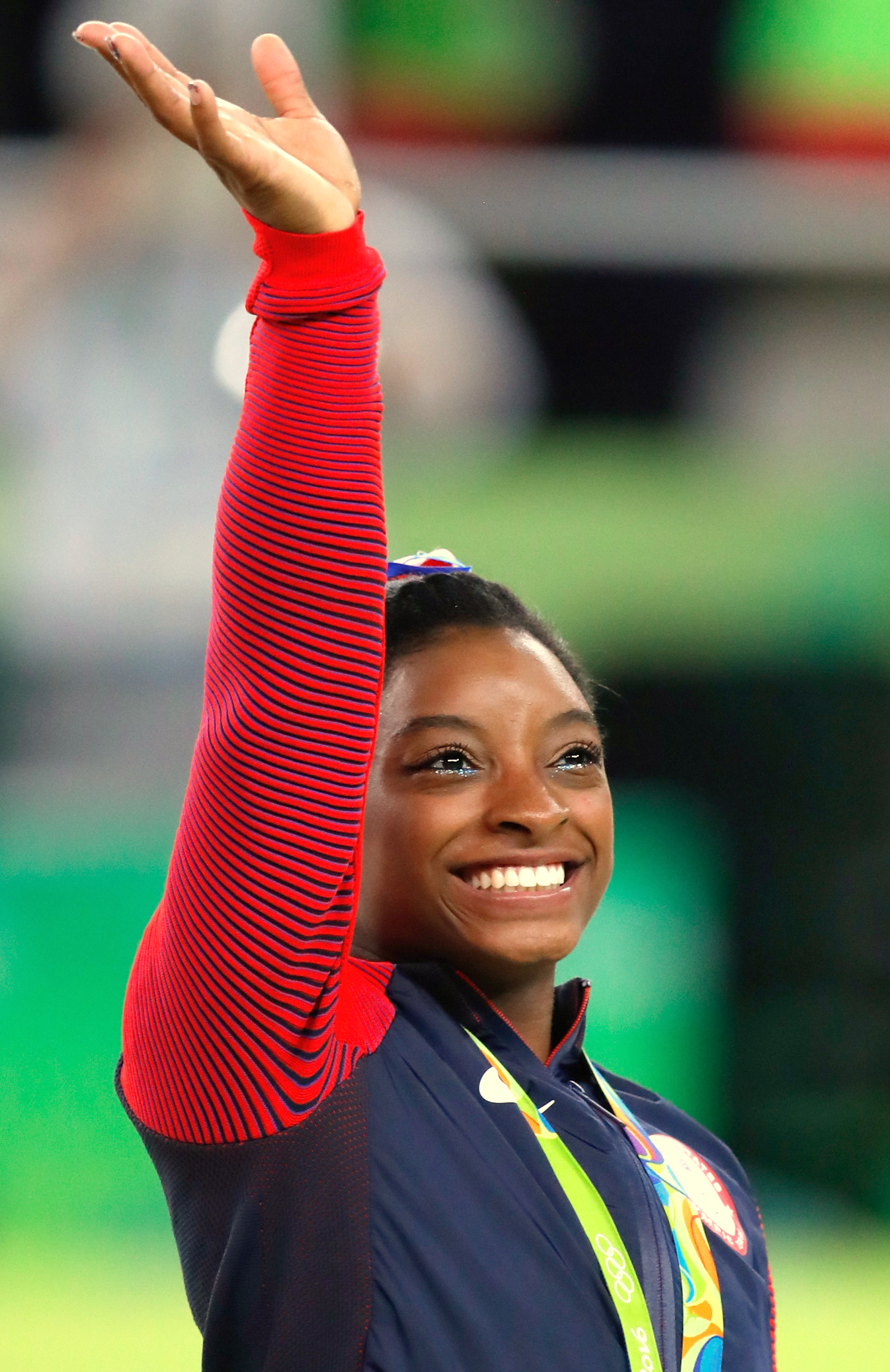
Simone Biles
2013–16, 2018–19, 2021, & 2023–24

Multi-time Men's National Champions

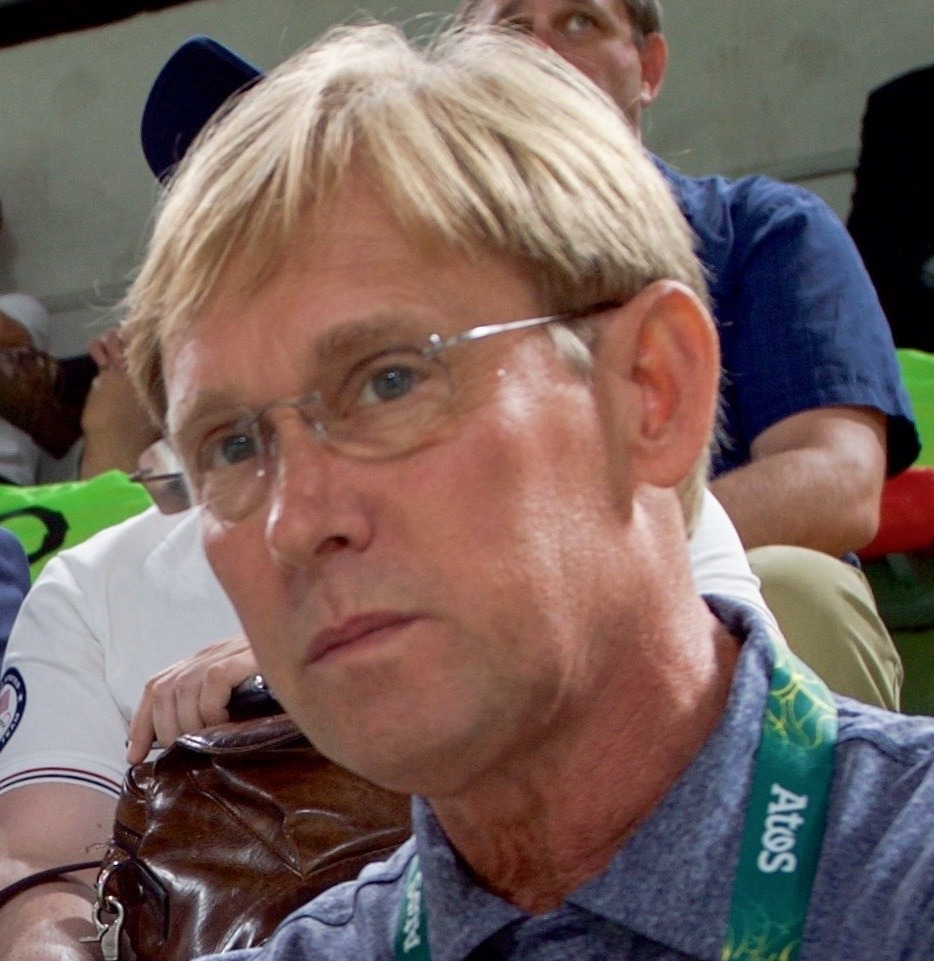
Bart Conner
1975 & 1979

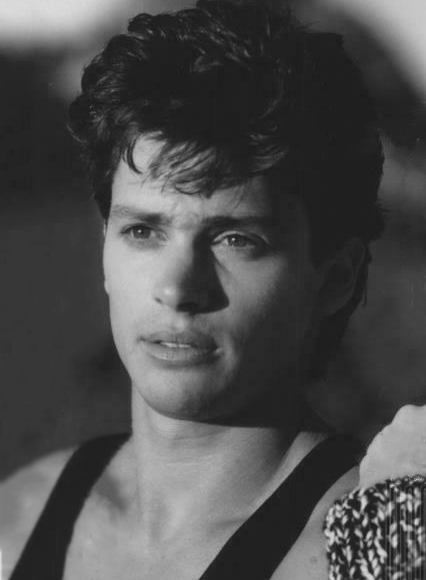
Mitch Gaylord
1983 & 1984

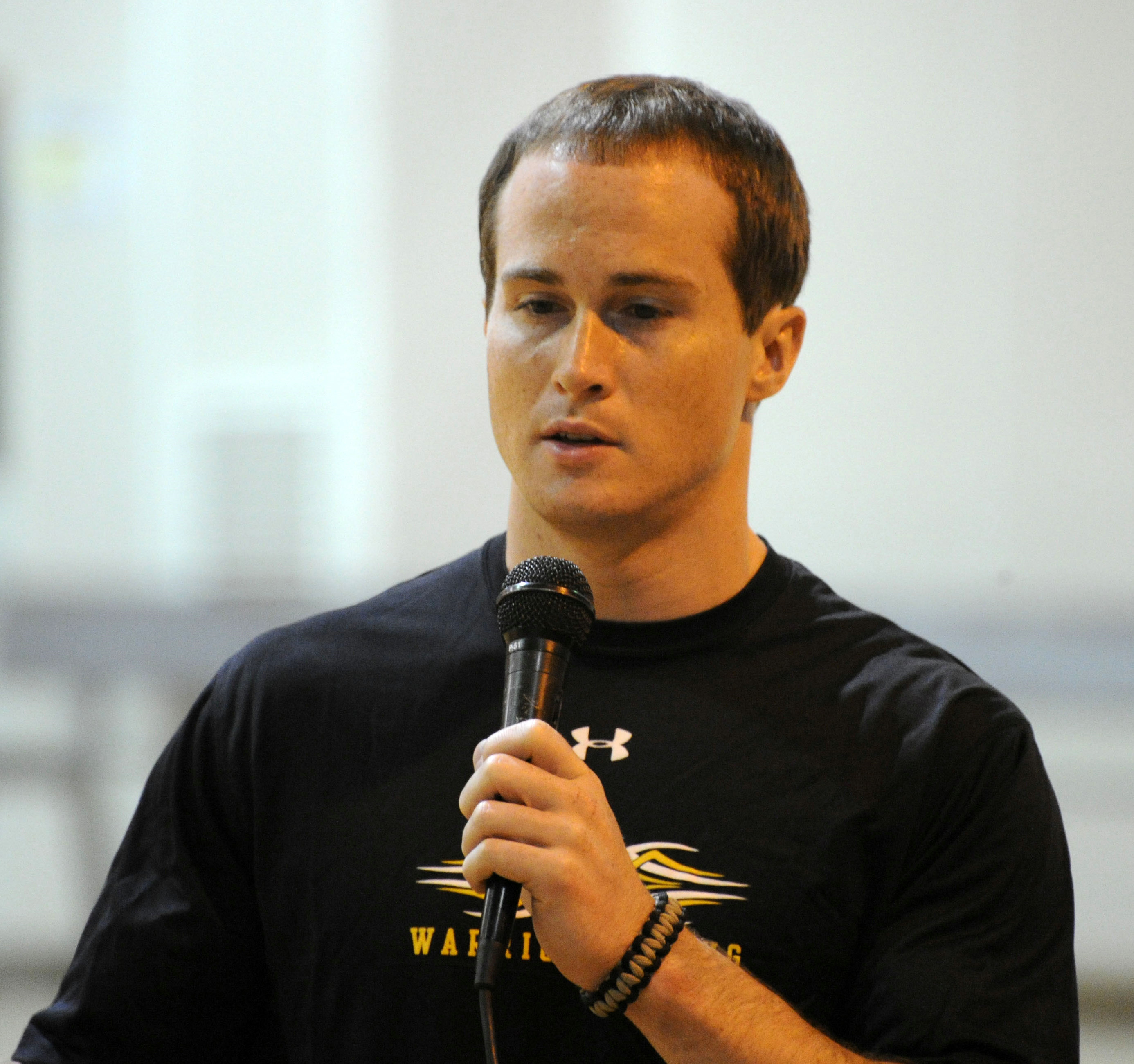
Paul Hamm
2002, 2003, & 2004

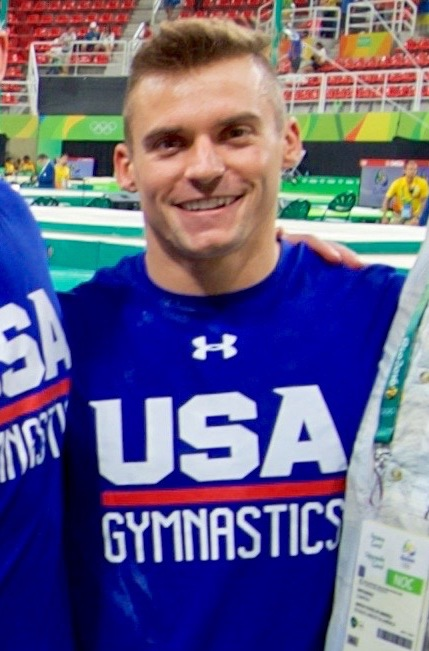
Sam Mikulak
2013–16 & 2018–19

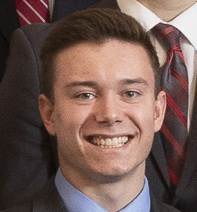
Brody Malone
2021–22, & 2024

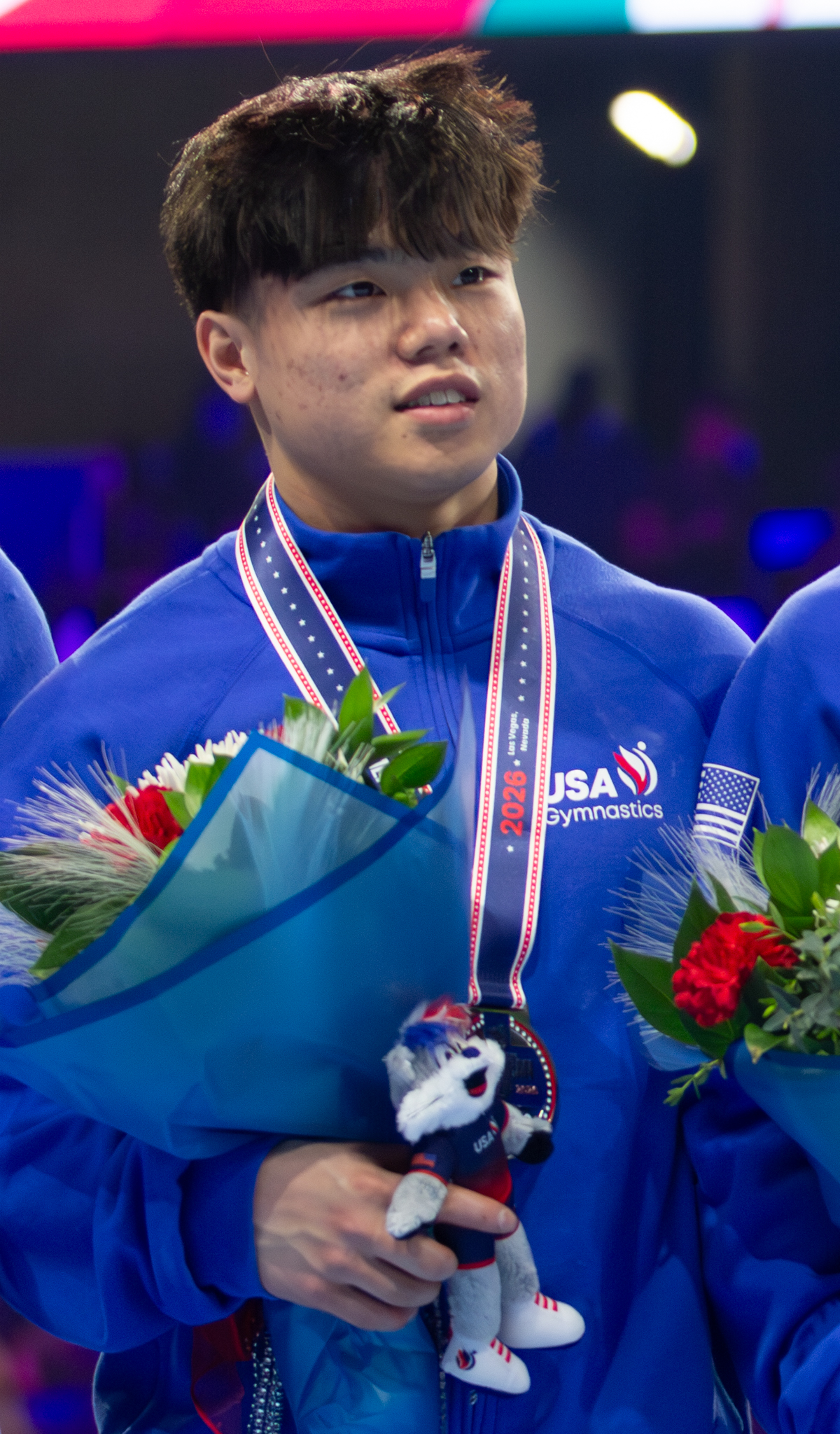
Asher Hong
2023 & 2025

== Event name ==
In recent years, the USA Gymnastics National Championships have been sponsored by various companies, and the event is typically named for the sponsoring company.

Year	Sponsor	Event name
1987–1988	McDonald's	McDonald's U.S. Gymnastics Championships
1992	Phar-Mor	Phar-Mor U.S. Gymnastics Championships
1993–1996	Coca-Cola	Coca-Cola National Championships
1997–2000	John Hancock Financial	John Hancock U.S. Gymnastics Championships
2004	Visa	Visa U.S. Gymnastics Championships
2005–2012	Visa	Visa Championships
2013–2017	Procter & Gamble	P&G Gymnastics Championships
2018–2021	National Broadcasting Company	NBC Gymnastics Championships
2022	OOFOS	OOFOS U.S. Gymnastics Championships
2023–present	Xfinity	Xfinity U.S. Gymnastics Championships

== See also ==
- American Cup
- Nastia Liukin Cup
- U.S. Classic
- Winter Cup
- U.S. Olympic Trials
- List of medalists
