= AAI Award =

US award for collegiate female gymnasts

- Awarded for: Most outstanding senior female gymnast in the country
- Country: United States
- Presented by: American Athletic, Inc.
- First award: 1982
- Currently held by: Jordan Chiles
- Website: Official website

The AAI Award is an annual award in the United States, given to the most outstanding senior collegiate female gymnast in the country. The award is voted on by NCAA women's gymnastics head coaches and sponsored by American Athletic, Inc.

== Winners ==
Year	Winner	College	Finalists	Reference
1982	Mary Ayotte-Law	Oregon State		
1984	Donna Kemp	UCLA		
1985	Barbara Mack	Alabama		
1986	Penney Hauschild	Alabama		
1987	Tami Elliot	Cal State Fullerton		
1988	Anita Botnen	Florida		
1989	Yumi Mordre	Washington		
1990	Marie Roethlisberger	Minnesota		
1991	Joy Selig	Oregon State		
1992	Missy Marlowe-Anglesey	Utah		
1993	Tammy Marshall	Massachusetts		
1994	Chari Knight	Oregon State		
1995	Beth Wymer	Michigan		
1996	Jenny Hansen	Kentucky		
1997	Kristin Quackenbush	West Virginia		
1998	Kim Arnold	Georgia		
1999	Jenni Beathard	Georgia		
2000	Heidi Hornbeek	Arizona		
2001	Mohini Bhardwaj	UCLA		
2002	Andree Pickens	Alabama		
2003	Theresa Kulikowski	Utah		
2004	Jamie Dantzscher	UCLA		
2005	Richelle Simpson	Nebraska		
2006	Courtney Bumpers	North Carolina		
2007	Janet Anson	Iowa State		
2008	Ashley Postell	Utah		
2009	Courtney Kupets	Georgia		
2010	Susan Jackson	LSU	Carly Janiga; Anna Li; Brandi Personett; Mandi Rodriguez; Elise Wheeler	
2011	Kylee Botterman	Michigan	Kayla Hoffman; Brittani McCullough; Sharaya Musser	
2012	Amy Glass	Boise State	Kat Ding; Megan Ferguson; Leslie Mak; Jaime Pisani; Geralen Stack	
2013	Vanessa Zamarripa	UCLA	Megan Olson; Marissa King; Sharaya Musser; Ashley Priess; Katie Zurales	
2014	Emily Wong	Nebraska	Katherine Grable; Kim Jacob; Alaina Johnson; Joanna Sampson; Taylor Spears	
2015	Georgia Dabritz	Utah	Erica Brewer; Rheagan Courville; Kytra Hunter; Samantha Peszek	
2016	Lindsay Mable	Minnesota	Caitlin Atkinson; Ivana Hong; Nina McGee; Haley Scaman; Bridget Sloan	
2017	Ashleigh Gnat	LSU	Nicole Artz; Chayse Capps; Madeline Gardiner; Peng-Peng Lee; Kaytianna McMillan; Baely Rowe	
2018	Elizabeth Price	Stanford	Kennedy Baker; Brianna Brown; Dani Dessaints; Cami Drouin-Allaire; Myia Hambrick; AJ Jackson; Alex McMurtry; Peng-Peng Lee; Kiana Winston	
2019	Sarah Finnegan	LSU	Alicia Boren; Brenna Dowell; Olivia Karas; Katelyn Ohashi; Toni-Ann Williams	
2020	Maggie Nichols	Oklahoma	Kennedi Edney; Taylor Houchin; Maddie Karr; Mollie Korth; Kyla Ross	
2021	Lexy Ramler	Minnesota	Alyssa Baumann; Lynnzee Brown; Nia Dennis; Kyana George; Anastasia Webb	
2022	Natalie Wojcik	Michigan	Kyla Bryant; Derrian Gobourne; Lexi Graber; Ona Loper; Trinity Thomas	
2023	Sierra Brooks	Michigan	Luisa Blanco; Lynnzee Brown; Maile O'Keefe; Trinity Thomas; Raena Worley	
2024	Haleigh Bryant	LSU	Luisa Blanco; Audrey Davis; Maile O'Keefe; Gabby Wilson; Raena Worley	
2025	Jade Carey	Oregon State	Jordan Bowers; Audrey Davis; Aleah Finnegan; Grace McCallum; Leanne Wong	
2026	Jordan Chiles	UCLA	Carly Baumann; Gabby Gladieux; Morgan Price; Anna Roberts; Nikki Smith; Faith Torrez	

== Total wins by school ==
Rank	School	Total
1	UCLA	5
2	LSU	4
2	Michigan	4
2	Oregon State	4
2	Utah	4
6	Alabama	3
6	Georgia	3
6	Minnesota	3
9	Nebraska	2
10	Arizona	1
10	Boise State	1
10	Cal State Fullerton	1
10	Florida	1
10	Kentucky	1
10	Iowa State	1
10	North Carolina	1
10	Oklahoma	1
10	Stanford	1
10	UMass	1
10	Washington	1
10	West Virginia	1

== See also ==
- Nissen-Emery Award
