= Joanna Sampson =

American artistic gymnast

- Born: December 4, 1992 (age 33) Willow Grove, Pennsylvania

Gymnastics career
- Discipline: Women's artistic gymnastics
- Country represented: United States
- College team: Michigan Wolverines
- Gym: Ricochets Gymnastics Club
- Former coach: Bev Plocki
Medal record
Representing Michigan Wolverines
NCAA Championships
Gold medal – first place	2013 Los Angeles	Floor exercise
Silver medal – second place	2014 Birmingham	Floor exercise
Bronze medal – third place	2013 Los Angeles	All-around

Joanna Sampson (born December 4, 1992) is a former American artistic gymnast. She competed for the Michigan Wolverines women's gymnastics team. Sampson was the first gymnast in Michigan program history to score a perfect 10.0 on floor exercise in any postseason competition in 2014.

== Personal life ==
Sampson was born in Willow Grove, Pennsylvania, to Robert and Donna Sampson. She attended Upper Moreland High School and graduated in 2010.

== Gymnastics ==
=== Early career ===
Sampson trained at Ricochets Gymnastics Club in Hatboro, Pennsylvania. She is a two-time national champion (uneven bars in 2008 and all-around in 2010) and a five-time regional and state champion. In 2008 she was national uneven bars champion and runner-up in the all-around, and state vault and floor champion. In 2010, she was the national all-around champion and runner-up on uneven bars, taking third on beam and floor, and the state all-around, vault and bars champion. She was also a Junior Olympic National Team member and two-time Region 7 All-Star Team member.

=== NCAA career ===
Sampson competed for the Michigan Wolverines women's gymnastics. As a freshman in 2011, at the Big Ten Championships, she scored a then career-best 9.925 on floor to take runner-up in the event. She won her first collegiate title on vault with a score of 9.900 at the Ann Arbor Regional of the 2011 NCAA Women's Gymnastics Championship. She became Michigan's first gymnast to win the regional vault title since 2002.

As a sophomore in 2012, at the 2012 Big Ten Championships, she scored 9.925 on vault to take runner-up in the event, and was named to the All-Big Ten Championships Team. She won the vault title for the second consecutive year with a score of 9.925 at the Auburn Regional of the 2012 NCAA Women's Gymnastics Championship.

As a junior in 2013, she took first place in the all-around in eight of the team's 14 meets while winning or sharing 23 individual-event titles. Her scoring average in the all-around (39.434) was the third-highest for a single season in program history. She won the national championship on floor exercise with a score of 9.9375 at the 2013 NCAA Women's Gymnastics Championship. She became the fourth gymnast in program history to win a national championship and the first gymnast in program history to win a national championship on floor exercise. Following an outstanding season she was named a three-time NCAA All-American, NCAA Northeast Region Gymnast of the Year, University of Michigan's Female Athlete of the Year and Big Ten Women's Gymnast of the Year.

As a senior in 2014, at the Big Ten Championships, she won the championship on uneven bars, and tied for first on floor exercise. She became the first women's gymnast in Big Ten Championships history to record a perfect 10.0 on floor exercise, and the first Michigan gymnast since Kylee Botterman in 2011 to post a perfect 10.0 on any event. She was the national runner-up on floor exercise at the 2014 NCAA Women's Gymnastics Championship. Following an outstanding season, she was named a three-time NCAA All-American, NCAA Northeast Region Gymnast of the Year, University of Michigan's Female Athlete of the Year, and an AAI Award finalist.

==== Career perfect 10.0 ====
Season	Date	Event	Meet
2014	March 22, 2014	Floor Exercise	Big Ten Championships

== Competitive history ==
=== NCAA ===
Year	Event	Team	AA	VT	UB	BB	FX
2011	Big Ten Championships	1st place, gold medalist(s)					2nd place, silver medalist(s)
2011	NCAA Championships	6					
2012	Big Ten Championships	4	20	2nd place, silver medalist(s)	47	28	33
2012	NCAA Championships			30			
2013	Big Ten Championships	2nd place, silver medalist(s)	3rd place, bronze medalist(s)	6	14	8	2nd place, silver medalist(s)
2013	NCAA Championships	7	3rd place, bronze medalist(s)	14			1st place, gold medalist(s)
2014	Big Ten Championships	1st place, gold medalist(s)	3rd place, bronze medalist(s)	6	1st place, gold medalist(s)		1st place, gold medalist(s)
2014	NCAA Championships	10	5		11		2nd place, silver medalist(s)
