= Sierra Brooks (gymnast) =

American artistic gymnast

- Born: September 29, 2001 (age 24) Hinsdale, Illinois, U.S.

Gymnastics career
- Discipline: Women's artistic gymnastics
- College team: Michigan Wolverines
- Club: Aspire Gymnastics Academy
- Head coach: Bev Plocki
- Awards: AAI Award (2023)
Medal record
Representing Michigan Wolverines
NCAA Championships
Gold medal – first place	2021 Fort Worth	Team
Silver medal – second place	2021 Fort Worth	All-around
Silver medal – second place	2021 Fort Worth	Balance beam
Silver medal – second place	2022 Fort Worth	Uneven bars
Silver medal – second place	2024 Fort Worth	Floor exercise

Sierra Brooks (born September 29, 2001) is an American artistic gymnast. She competed for the Michigan Wolverines women's gymnastics team, and is a six-time All-American and the 2023 AAI Award recipient.

== Early and personal life ==
Brooks was born in Hinsdale, Illinois to David and Shannon Brooks. Her father, David, played college baseball at Eastern Illinois, while her mother, Shannon, was a member of the Bradley University dance team. She attended Oswego East High School in Oswego, Illinois, and was a five-time Illinois state champion, and a two-time Region 5 All-Star team member.

Brooks was a four-time Junior Olympics national team member. At the 2016 Junior Olympic Nationals she placed second on vault and tied for second in the all-around. At the 2017 Women's Junior Olympic National Championships, she placed second on the vault, tied for second on the balance beam, and third in the all-around. At the 2018 Women's Junior Olympic National Championships, she placed second on the vault and third in the all-around. At the 2019 Women's Junior Olympic National Championships, she won vault, beam, floor and the all-around.

== Career ==
On May 1, 2019, Brooks signed her national letter of intent to attend the University of Michigan. In the fall of 2020, Brooks joined the Michigan Wolverines women's gymnastics team. During her freshman year she won 11 event and all-around titles, including two on vault, two on bars, two on balance beam, two on floor and three in the all-around. She finished the regular season ranked second in the conference in the all-around, third on vault, tied for fifth on uneven bars and floor exercise, and eighth on balance beam. She ranked among the top 50 nationally on vault (T-15th), bars (T-32nd), beam (35th), floor (T-37th) and the all-around (11th). She was named Big Ten Freshman of the Week seven times. Following the season she was named the WCGA Northeast Regional Gymnast of the Year and the Big Ten Freshman of the Year.

During her sophomore year in 2021, she won 13 event titles, including six vault, one uneven bars, two beam and four all-around. She finished the regular season ranked fifth on the vault and 15th in the all-around, while also ranking 22nd on bars and 31st on beam. During the 2021 NCAA Women's Gymnastics Championship she recorded the highest all-around scored in Michigan NCAA Championship history with a career-best 39.7750. She won a silver medal in the balance beam and individual all-around to help Michigan win their first NCAA Championship in program history, with a program best score of 198.2500. Following the season she was named a four-time WCGA All-American (all-around, uneven bars, balance beam, floor).

On August 31, 2021, Brooks was named a captain for the 2022 season. During her junior year in 2022, she won 15 individual event and all-around titles, including five on vault, two on uneven bars, two on beam, three on floor and three in the all-around. She finished the regular season ranked third nationally in the all-around, while ranking fourth on the vault and seventh on the floor. On February 26, 2022, she recorded her first career perfect 10.0 on the vault. During the 2022 Big Ten Championships she posted her second career 10.0, winning the individual vault title, and helping Michigan win the Big Ten Championship. During the 2022 NCAA Women's Gymnastics Championship she won a silver medal in the uneven bars. Following the season she was named a two-time WCGA All-American (vault, uneven bars), the WCGA Northeast Regional Gymnast of the Year and Big Ten Gymnast of the Year.

During her senior year in 2023 Brooks earned 16 event titles including four all-around titles, and was a three-time Big Ten Gymnast of the Week honoree. She became the 13th Wolverine in program history to earn first team all-conference honors on four occasions. She became the first Michigan gymnast to be named a three-time Regional Gymnast of the Year. Following the season she was named the Big Ten Gymnast of the Year for the second consecutive year. She became the third Michigan gymnast to earn the honor twice or more, following Beth Wymer and Sarah Cain. She was also awarded the AAI Award.

During her graduate year on January 12, 2024 Brooks broke Michigan's all-around record with a 39.850, surpassing the previous record of 39.825 held by Natalie Wojcik, Elise Ray, Sarah Cain and Beth Wymer. She scored a perfect 10.0 on floor, a 9.975 on vault and beam and a 9.900 on uneven bars.

=== Career perfect 10.0s ===
Season	Date	Event	Meet
2022	February 26, 2022	Vault	Michigan vs. Nebraska
2022	March 19, 2022	Vault	Big Ten Championships
2023	February 3, 2023	Vault	Michigan vs. Rutgers
2023	March 31, 2023	Floor	Denver Regional
2024	January 12, 2024	Floor	Michigan vs. Stanford

=== NCAA regular season ranking ===
Season	All-Around	Vault	Uneven Bars	Balance Beam	Floor Exercise
2020 (Note: The season was cancelled after the 10th week of competition due to the COVID-19 pandemic.)	11th	15th	32nd	35th	37th
2021	15th	5th	22nd	31st	61st
2022	3rd	4th	33rd	65th	7th
2023	8th	5th	14th	19th	18th
2024	9th	13th	15th	13th	7th

== Competitive history ==
Year	Event	Team	AA	VT	UB	BB	FX
NCAA
2020	Postseason cancelled due to the COVID-19 pandemic						
2021	Big Ten Championships	2nd place, silver medalist(s)		31	5	21	22
2021	NCAA Championships	1st place, gold medalist(s)	2nd place, silver medalist(s)			2nd place, silver medalist(s)	
2022	Big Ten Championships	1st place, gold medalist(s)	3rd place, bronze medalist(s)	1st place, gold medalist(s)	17	5	7
2022	NCAA Championships	8	18		2nd place, silver medalist(s)		
2023	Big Ten Championships	1st place, gold medalist(s)	3rd place, bronze medalist(s)	43	1st place, gold medalist(s)	2nd place, silver medalist(s)	3rd place, bronze medalist(s)
2024	NCAA Championships						2nd place, silver medalist(s)
