= 2023 NCAA women's gymnastics tournament =

Collegiate gymnastics competition

- Venue: Dickies Arena (semi-finals and final)
- Location: Fort Worth, Texas
- Teams: 36

Medalists
| gold medal | Oklahoma |
| silver medal | Florida |
| bronze medal | Utah |

The 2023 NCAA women's gymnastics tournament was the 40th NCAA women's gymnastics tournament, the annual women's gymnastics championship contested by the teams of the member associations of NCAA. The first and second round and regional final were hosted on campuses from March 29 to April 2, 2023, while the semi-final and final were held at Dickies Arena in Fort Worth, Texas from April 13 to April 15, 2023.

== Format ==
The eight lowest seeded teams competed in the first round, followed by the second round. The top two teams from each region were moved on to the semi-finals.

== Bracket ==
First round
March 29 – Norman
NC State | 196.075
Ball State | 195.375
March 29 – Los Angeles
BYU | 196.125
Boise State | 196.700
March 30 – Pittsburgh
Towson | 195.450
Penn State | 195.700
March 30 – Denver
Arizona | 196.050
North Carolina | 194.600

Second round
March 30 – Norman
#9 Kentucky #8 Alabama | 197.475 197.375
Iowa Illinois | 196.500 195.675
March 30 – Norman
#1 Oklahoma #16 Ohio State | 197.925 197.350
Arkansas NC State | 197.275 195.375
March 30 – Los Angeles
#5 Utah Washington | 198.125 196.775
Southern Utah #12 Auburn | 196.600 195.900
March 30 – Los Angeles
#4 UCLA #14 Missouri | 198.275 197.400
Stanford Boise State | 197.275 196.225
March 31 – Pittsburgh
#7 California #10 Michigan State | 197.250 196.825
Western Michigan West Virginia | 196.175 195.850
March 31 – Pittsburgh
#2 Florida #15 Arizona State | 197.875 197.525
Penn State Maryland | 196.825 196.675
March 31 – Denver
#6 LSU #11 Oregon State | 197.375 197.375
Georgia Nebraska | 197.000 195.525
March 31 – Denver
#3 Michigan #13 Denver | 198.025 197.450
Minnesota Arizona | 197.200 196.975

Regional final
April 1 – Norman
#9 Kentucky #8 Alabama | 197.850 197.650
#1 Oklahoma #16 Ohio State | 198.050 197.750
April 1 – Los Angeles
#5 Utah Washington | 198.050 195.650
#4 UCLA #13 Missouri | 197.925 197.600
April 2 – Pittsburgh
#7 California #10 Michigan State | 198.075 197.650
#2 Florida #15 Arizona State | 197.800 197.475
April 2 – Denver
#6 LSU #11 Oregon State | 197.750 197.650
#3 Michigan #13 Denver | 197.750 197.875

Semi-finals
April 13 – Fort Worth
#9 Kentucky #1 Oklahoma | 197.1250 198.1625
#5 Utah #4 UCLA | 198.2250 197.9125
April 13 – Fort Worth
#7 California #2 Florida | 196.9125 197.400
#6 LSU #13 Denver | 197.475 196.500

Final
April 15 – Fort Worth
#1 Oklahoma #2 Florida | 198.3875 198.2375
#5 Utah #6 LSU | 197.9375 197.5250

== Individual qualifiers ==
2023 NCAA women's gymnastics tournament individual qualifiers
| Vault | Uneven bars | Balance beam | Floor exercise | All-around |
|---|---|---|---|---|
| Courtney Blackson (Boise State) | Luisa Blanco (Alabama) | Jade Carey (Oregon State) | Sierra Brooks (Michigan) | Payton Harris (Ohio State) |
| Naomi Morrison (Michigan) | Emily Lopez (Boise State) | Norah Flatley (Arkansas) | Elexis Edwards (Ohio State) | Abby Heiskell (Michigan) |
| Ava Piedrahita (Penn State) | Cassidy Rushlow (Penn State) | Alisa Sheremeta (Missouri) | Derrian Gobourne (Auburn) | Hannah Scharf (Arizona State) |
| Lauren Williams (Arkansas) | Natalie Wojcik (Michigan) | Gabrielle Stephen (Michigan State) | Delanie Harkness (Michigan State) | Chloe Widner (Stanford) |

== Regional results ==
=== Norman Regional ===
First round

| Seed | School | Vault | Bars | Beam | Floor | Overall |
|---|---|---|---|---|---|---|
| – | NC State | 48.650 | 49.225 | 49.175 | 49.025 | 196.075 |
| – | Ball State | 49.075 | 48.375 | 48.950 | 48.975 | 195.375 |

Session 1 (Round 2)

| Seed | School | Vault | Bars | Beam | Floor | Overall |
|---|---|---|---|---|---|---|
| 9 | Kentucky | 49.200 | 49.475 | 49.350 | 49.450 | 197.475 |
| 8 | Alabama | 49.275 | 49.525 | 49.175 | 49.400 | 197.375 |
| – | Iowa | 49.075 | 49.000 | 49.175 | 49.250 | 196.500 |
| – | Illinois | 48.650 | 48.700 | 49.150 | 49.175 | 195.675 |

Session 2 (Round 2)

| Seed | School | Vault | Bars | Beam | Floor | Overall |
|---|---|---|---|---|---|---|
| 1 | Oklahoma | 49.400 | 49.600 | 49.475 | 49.450 | 197.925 |
| 16 | Ohio State | 49.275 | 49.325 | 49.225 | 49.525 | 197.350 |
| – | Arkansas | 49.225 | 49.350 | 49.200 | 49.500 | 197.275 |
| – | NC State | 48.875 | 48.400 | 48.900 | 49.200 | 195.375 |

Regional Final

| Seed | School | Vault | Bars | Beam | Floor | Overall |
|---|---|---|---|---|---|---|
| 1 | Oklahoma | 49.625 | 49.675 | 49.075 | 49.675 | 198.050 |
| 9 | Kentucky | 49.450 | 49.450 | 49.575 | 49.375 | 197.850 |
| 16 | Ohio State | 49.375 | 49.425 | 49.450 | 49.475 | 197.725 |
| 8 | Alabama | 49.275 | 49.400 | 49.425 | 49.550 | 197.650 |

=== Los Angeles Regional ===
First round

| Seed | School | Vault | Bars | Beam | Floor | Overall |
|---|---|---|---|---|---|---|
| – | Boise State | 49.125 | 48.950 | 49.100 | 49.250 | 196.425 |
| – | BYU | 48.900 | 49.150 | 47.875 | 49.225 | 195.150 |

Session 1 (Round 2)

| Seed | School | Vault | Bars | Beam | Floor | Overall |
|---|---|---|---|---|---|---|
| 5 | Utah | 49.625 | 49.625 | 49.500 | 49.375 | 198.125 |
| – | Washington | 49.050 | 49.225 | 49.325 | 49.175 | 196.775 |
| – | SUU | 49.150 | 48.950 | 49.225 | 49.275 | 196.600 |
| 12 | Auburn | 49.200 | 48.150 | 49.175 | 49.375 | 195.900 |

Session 2 (Round 2)

| Seed | School | Vault | Bars | Beam | Floor | Overall |
|---|---|---|---|---|---|---|
| 4 | UCLA | 49.575 | 49.525 | 49.675 | 49.500 | 198.275 |
| 14 | Missouri | 49.400 | 49.150 | 49.475 | 49.375 | 197.400 |
| – | Stanford | 49.450 | 49.275 | 49.400 | 49.150 | 197.275 |
| – | Boise State | 48.725 | 49.300 | 49.150 | 49.050 | 196.225 |

Regional Final

| Seed | School | Vault | Bars | Beam | Floor | Overall |
|---|---|---|---|---|---|---|
| 5 | Utah | 49.575 | 49.350 | 49.525 | 49.600 | 198.050 |
| 4 | UCLA | 49.500 | 49.400 | 49.325 | 49.700 | 197.925 |
| 13 | Missouri | 49.450 | 49.225 | 49.400 | 49.525 | 197.600 |
| – | Washington | 49.150 | 48.900 | 48.450 | 49.150 | 195.650 |

=== Pittsburgh Regional ===
First round

| Seed | School | Vault | Bars | Beam | Floor | Overall |
|---|---|---|---|---|---|---|
| – | Penn State | 48.950 | 49.100 | 48.425 | 49.150 | 195.700 |
| – | Towson | 49.000 | 49.175 | 48.175 | 49.100 | 195.450 |

Session 1 (Round 2)

| Seed | School | Vault | Bars | Beam | Floor | Overall |
|---|---|---|---|---|---|---|
| 7 | California | 48.925 | 49.500 | 49.275 | 49.550 | 197.250 |
| 10 | Michigan State | 49.000 | 49.325 | 49.025 | 49.475 | 196.825 |
| – | Western Michigan | 49.100 | 48.725 | 48.950 | 49.400 | 196.175 |
| – | West Virginia | 49.075 | 48.775 | 48.650 | 49.350 | 195.850 |

Session 2 (Round 2)

| Seed | School | Vault | Bars | Beam | Floor | Overall |
|---|---|---|---|---|---|---|
| 2 | Florida | 49.375 | 49.525 | 49.575 | 49.400 | 197.875 |
| 15 | Arizona State | 49.225 | 49.400 | 49.475 | 49.425 | 197.525 |
| – | Penn State | 49.000 | 49.325 | 49.150 | 49.350 | 196.825 |
| – | Maryland | 48.925 | 49.275 | 49.175 | 49.300 | 196.675 |

Regional Final

| Seed | School | Vault | Bars | Beam | Floor | Overall |
|---|---|---|---|---|---|---|
| 7 | California | 49.275 | 49.525 | 49.650 | 49.625 | 198.075 |
| 2 | Florida | 49.300 | 49.575 | 49.600 | 49.325 | 197.800 |
| 10 | Michigan State | 49.225 | 49.525 | 49.425 | 49.475 | 197.650 |
| 15 | Arizona State | 49.450 | 49.500 | 49.225 | 49.300 | 197.475 |

=== Denver Regional ===
First round

| Seed | School | Vault | Bars | Beam | Floor | Overall |
|---|---|---|---|---|---|---|
| – | Arizona | 48.800 | 48.925 | 48.975 | 49.350 | 196.050 |
| – | North Carolina | 48.800 | 48.900 | 49.000 | 47.900 | 194.600 |

Session 1 (Round 2)

| Seed | School | Vault | Bars | Beam | Floor | Overall |
|---|---|---|---|---|---|---|
| 6 | LSU | 49.250 | 49.275 | 49.325 | 49.525 | 197.375 |
| 11 | Oregon State | 49.250 | 49.125 | 49.450 | 49.550 | 197.375 |
| – | Georgia | 49.150 | 49.300 | 49.300 | 49.250 | 197.000 |
| – | Nebraska | 48.950 | 48.675 | 48.625 | 49.275 | 195.525 |

Session 2 (Round 2)

| Seed | School | Vault | Bars | Beam | Floor | Overall |
|---|---|---|---|---|---|---|
| 3 | Michigan | 49.525 | 49.425 | 49.375 | 49.700 | 198.025 |
| 13 | Denver | 49.100 | 49.250 | 49.500 | 49.600 | 197.450 |
| – | Minnesota | 49.275 | 49.275 | 49.150 | 49.500 | 197.200 |
| – | Arizona | 49.125 | 49.100 | 49.300 | 49.450 | 196.975 |

Regional Final

| Seed | School | Vault | Bars | Beam | Floor | Overall |
|---|---|---|---|---|---|---|
| 13 | Denver | 49.275 | 49.550 | 49.625 | 49.425 | 197.875 |
| 6 | LSU | 49.375 | 49.525 | 49.425 | 49.425 | 197.750 |
| 3 | Michigan | 49.425 | 49.650 | 49.325 | 49.350 | 197.750 |
| 11 | Oregon State | 49.400 | 49.500 | 49.400 | 49.350 | 197.650 |

== NCAA championship ==
=== Semi-finals ===
The top two teams from each semifinal advanced to the National Championship, which were televised live on ABC on April 16 at 1:00 pm ET.

Semifinal I - April 14 at 3PM ET
| Seed | School | Vault | Bars | Beam | Floor | Total |
|---|---|---|---|---|---|---|
| 6 | LSU | 49.2500 | 49.4750 | 49.2750 | 49.4750 | 197.4750 |
| 2 | Florida | 49.3000 | 49.4875 | 49.0875 | 49.5250 | 197.4000 |
| 7 | California | 49.3500 | 48.7125 | 49.4125 | 49.4375 | 196.9125 |
| 13 | Denver | 49.2250 | 49.3625 | 48.5500 | 49.3625 | 196.5000 |

Semifinal II - April 13 at 6PM ET
| Seed | School | Vault | Bars | Beam | Floor | Total |
|---|---|---|---|---|---|---|
| 5 | Utah | 49.3625 | 49.6750 | 49.6875 | 49.5000 | 198.2250 |
| 1 | Oklahoma | 49.4625 | 49.4875 | 49.5500 | 49.6625 | 198.1625 |
| 4 | UCLA | 49.1750 | 49.5125 | 49.5125 | 49.7125 | 197.9125 |
| 9 | Kentucky | 49.3125 | 49.1250 | 49.4125 | 49.2750 | 197.1250 |

=== Final ===
| Rank | Team | Vault (gymnastics) | Uneven bars | Balance beam | Floor (gymnastics) | Total |
|---|---|---|---|---|---|---|
| 1st place, gold medalist(s) | Oklahoma | 49.5625 | 49.6375 | 49.5125 | 49.6750 | 198.3875 |
| 1st place, gold medalist(s) | Jordan Bowers | 9.9000 | 9.9250 | 9.9125 | 9.9500 | 39.6875 |
| 1st place, gold medalist(s) | Audrey Davis | | 9.9250 | 9.9500 | 9.9000 | |
| 1st place, gold medalist(s) | Jenna Dunn | | | 9.8500 | | |
| 1st place, gold medalist(s) | Danae Fletcher | | 9.9125 | | 9.9375 | |
| 1st place, gold medalist(s) | Katherine LeVasseur | 9.8875 | | | | |
| 1st place, gold medalist(s) | Danielle Sievers | 9.8625 | 9.9250 | | 9.9500 | |
| 1st place, gold medalist(s) | Ragan Smith | | 9.8875 | 9.9000 | 9.9125 | |
| 1st place, gold medalist(s) | Allie Stern | 9.9000 | | | | |
| 1st place, gold medalist(s) | Faith Torrez | 9.9250 | | 9.9000 | 9.9250 | |
| 1st place, gold medalist(s) | Olivia Trautman | 9.9500 | 9.9500 | 9.98250 | | |
| 2nd place, silver medalist(s) | Florida | 49.5750 | 49.7125 | 49.5250 | 49.4250 | 198.2375 |
| 2nd place, silver medalist(s) | Rachel Baumann | | | | 9.9000 | |
| 2nd place, silver medalist(s) | Sloane Blakely | 9.8750 | 9.9250 | 9.9000 | 9.8625 | 39.5625 |
| 2nd place, silver medalist(s) | Kayla Dicello | 9.9000 | 9.9750 | 9.9000 | 9.9000 | 39.6750 |
| 2nd place, silver medalist(s) | Ellie Lazzari | | | 9.0125 | | |
| 2nd place, silver medalist(s) | Riley McCusker | | 9.9250 | 9.9375 | | |
| 2nd place, silver medalist(s) | Victoria Nguyen | 9.8875 | 9.9000 | 9.8750 | 9.8875 | 39.5500 |
| 2nd place, silver medalist(s) | Payton Richards | 9.8375 | | | 9.8750 | |
| 2nd place, silver medalist(s) | Trinity Thomas | 10.0000 | 9.9125 | | | |
| 2nd place, silver medalist(s) | Leanne Wong | 9.9125 | 9.9750 | 9.9125 | 9.7250 | 39.5250 |
| 3rd place, bronze medalist(s) | Utah | 49.3000 | 49.4375 | 49.4750 | 49.5875 | 197.8000 |
| 3rd place, bronze medalist(s) | Abby Brenner | 9.9000 | 9.8750 | | 9.8750 | |
| 3rd place, bronze medalist(s) | Kara Eaker | | | 9.9125 | | |
| 3rd place, bronze medalist(s) | Jaylene Gilstrap | 9.8125 | | | 9.8750 | |
| 3rd place, bronze medalist(s) | Jillian Hoffman | 9.7625 | | | | |
| 3rd place, bronze medalist(s) | Cristal Isa | | 9.8750 | 9.9500 | | |
| 3rd place, bronze medalist(s) | Grace McCallum | | 9.9375 | 9.8875 | | |
| 3rd place, bronze medalist(s) | Amelie Morgan | | 9.8500 | 9.9125 | | |
| 3rd place, bronze medalist(s) | Maile O'Keefe | 9.7375 | 9.9250 | 10.000 | 9.9000 | 39.5625 |
| 3rd place, bronze medalist(s) | Abby Paulson | | | 9.9625 | 9.9000 | |
| 3rd place, bronze medalist(s) | Jaedyn Rucker | 9.8375 | | | 9.9000 | |
| 3rd place, bronze medalist(s) | Makenna Smith | 9.8375 | | | 9.9250 | |
| 3rd place, bronze medalist(s) | Sage Thompson | | 9.9375 | | | |
| 4 | LSU | 49.5250 | 49.3125 | 49.2375 | 49.4500 | 197.5250 |
| 4 | Elena Arenas | 9.9000 | | 9.4750 | 9.8125 | |
| 4 | Sierra Ballard | | | 9.8250 | 9.8125 | |
| 4 | Chase Brock | 9.8875 | | | 9.9250 | |
| 4 | Haleigh Bryant | 9.9875 | 9.9500 | 9.8500 | 9.9375 | 39.7250 |
| 4 | Ashley Cowan | | 9.8250 | | | |
| 4 | Aleah Finnegan | 9.8625 | 9.8250 | 9.9250 | 9.9250 | 39.5375 |
| 4 | Alexis Jeffrey | | 9.8375 | 9.8250 | | |
| 4 | Alyona Shchennikova | 9.8250 | 9.8000 | 9.8125 | 9.8500 | 39.2875 |
| 4 | Tori Tatum | | 9.8750 | | | |
| 4 | Bryce Wilson | 9.8875 | | | | |

== Individual results ==
=== Medalists ===
| Event | Gold | Silver | Bronze |
|---|---|---|---|
| Individual all-around | Maile O'Keefe (Utah) | Jordan Chiles (UCLA) | Haleigh Bryant (LSU) |
| Vault | Olivia Trautman (Oklahoma) | Lynnzee Brown (Denver) Courtney Blackson (Boise State) | —N/a |
| Uneven bars | Jordan Chiles (UCLA) | Trinity Thomas (Florida) Abby Heiskell (Michigan) Maile O'Keefe (Utah) Grace McCallum (Utah) Luisa Blanco (Alabama) | —N/a |
| Balance beam | Maile O'Keefe (Utah) | Jade Carey (Oregon State) Cristal Isa (Utah) | —N/a |
| Floor | Jordan Chiles (UCLA) | Leanne Wong (Florida) Aleah Finnegan (LSU) | —N/a |

=== All-around ===
| Rank | Gymnast | Vault (gymnastics) | Uneven bars | Balance beam | Floor (gymnastics) | Total |
|---|---|---|---|---|---|---|
| 1st place, gold medalist(s) | Maile O'Keefe (Utah) | 9.8625 | 9.9500 | 10.0000 | 9.9500 | 39.7625 |
| 2nd place, silver medalist(s) | Jordan Chiles (UCLA) | 9.9000 | 10.0000 | 9.8250 | 9.9875 | 39.7125 |
| 3rd place, bronze medalist(s) | Haleigh Bryant (LSU) | 9.8625 | 9.9375 | 9.9375 | 9.9500 | 39.6875 |
| 4 | Lynnzee Brown (Denver) | 9.9250 | 9.8750 | 9.9125 | 9.9500 | 39.6625 |
| 5 | Aleah Finnegan (LSU) | 9.8500 | 9.9250 | 9.9125 | 9.9625 | 39.6500 |
| 6 | Selena Harris (UCLA) | 9.8000 | 9.9125 | 9.9375 | 9.9500 | 39.6000 |
| 7 | Raena Worley (Kentucky) | 9.8500 | 9.9250 | 9.8750 | 9.9375 | 39.5875 |
| 8 | Jessica Hutchinson (Denver) | 9.8375 | 9.8500 | 9.9250 | 9.9500 | 39.5625 |
| 8 | Leanne Wong (Florida) | 9.8625 | 9.9375 | 9.8000 | 9.9625 | 39.5625 |
| 10 | Madelyn Williams (California) | 9.8625 | 9.8750 | 9.9250 | 9.8500 | 39.5125 |
| 11 | Abby Heiskell (Michigan) | 9.7750 | 9.9500 | 9.8375 | 9.9375 | 39.5000 |
| 11 | Audrey Davis (Oklahoma) | 9.8375 | 9.9000 | 9.8625 | 9.9000 | 39.5000 |
| 11 | Kayla DiCello (Florida) | 9.8125 | 9.8750 | 9.9250 | 9.8875 | 39.5000 |
| 14 | eMjae Frazier (California) | 9.8875 | 9.7875 | 9.8500 | 9.9375 | 39.4625 |
| 14 | Jordan Bowers (Oklahoma) | 9.8125 | 9.8750 | 9.8250 | 9.9500 | 39.4625 |
| 16 | Andi Li (California) | 9.8250 | 9.9000 | 9.8500 | 9.8750 | 39.4500 |
| 17 | Nevaeh DeSouza (California) | 9.8625 | 9.8750 | 9.8500 | 9.8375 | 39.4250 |
| 18 | Payton Harris (Ohio State) | 9.8500 | 9.7625 | 9.8875 | 9.8750 | 39.3750 |
| 19 | Alyona Shchennikova (LSU) | 9.8375 | 9.8625 | 9.7750 | 9.8875 | 39.3625 |
| 20 | Jillian Procasky (Kentucky) | 9.7375 | 9.8000 | 9.8500 | 9.8000 | 39.1875 |
| 21 | Sloane Blakely (Florida) | 9.8000 | 9.2375 | 9.9375 | 9.8500 | 38.8250 |
| 22 | Hannah Scharf (Arizona State) | 9.8375 | 9.8625 | 9.1500 | 9.7875 | 38.6375 |
| 23 | Chloe Widner (Stanford) | 9.7750 | 9.8500 | 9.9500 | 8.7875 | 38.3625 |
