= 2021 Michigan Wolverines women's gymnastics team =

American college gymnastics season

2021 Michigan Wolverines women's gymnastics

NCAA Championship, National Champions
- Conference: Big Ten Conference
- Record: 29–2–0 (7–1–0 B1G)
- Head coach: Bev Plocki (32nd season)
- Assistant coaches: Scott Sherman (26th season); Maile'ana Kanewa-Mariano (3rd season)
- Home arena: Crisler Center

The 2021 Michigan Wolverines women's gymnastics team represented the University of Michigan in the 2021 NCAA Division I women's gymnastics season as members of the Big Ten Conference in their 46th season of collegiate competition. The Wolverines were led by head coach Bev Plocki in her thirty-second season, and played their home meets at the Crisler Center in Ann Arbor, Michigan.

The Wolverines advanced to the NCAA Regional Championship round for the 30th time in program history where they won their 13th regional championship to advance to the NCAA National Championship. Michigan won their first NCAA title with a program best score of 198.2500.

== Previous season ==
The Wolverines finished the 2020 season with an overall record of 12–1, in a season that was cancelled due to the COVID-19 pandemic.

== Roster ==
Name	Year	Hometown	Secondary school	Club
Carly Bauman	FR	Des Moines, IA	Valley High School	Chow's Gymnastics and Dance Institute
Abby Brenner	JR	Maple Grove, MN	Spring Creek Academy (Texas)	Metroplex Gymnastics, Twin City Twisters
Sierra Brooks	SO	Plainfield, IL	Oswego East High School	Aspire Gymnastics Academy
Anna Dayton	SR	Grand Rapids, MI	East Grand Rapids	Geddert's Twistars USA
Lauren Farley	SR	Dallas, TX	Spring Creek Academy	WOGA
Abbie Gaies	SO	Ann Arbor, MI	Community High School	Michigan Academy of Gymnastics
Reyna Guggino	FR	Tampa, FL	H. B. Plant High School	Tampa Bay Turners
Abby Heiskell	JR	Charlotte, NC	Marvin Ridge High School	Southeastern Gymnastics
Nicolette Koulos	SO	Long Beach, CA	Los Alamitos High School	Wildfire Gymnastics
Maddie Mariani	JR	Tucson, AZ	Sabino High School	Arizona Dynamics
Anne Maxim	SR	Clinton Township, MI	Chippewa Valley High School	Olympia Gymnastics Academy
Naomi Morrison	FR	Chandler, AZ	Perry High School	Arizona Dynamics
Jenna Mulligan	FR	Fruit Cove, FL	The Bolles School	Gymnastics Unlimited
Gabby Wilson	SO	Ypsilanti, MI	Skyline High School	Olympia Gymnastics Academy
Natalie Wojcik	JR	Douglassville, PA	21st Century Cyber Charter School	Stallone Gymnastics

== Coaching staff ==
Name	Position	Seasons
Bev Plocki	Head coach	1990–present
Scott Sherman	Assistant coach	1996–present
Maile'ana Kanewa-Mariano	Assistant Coach	2019–present
Lexi Funk	Volunteer Assistant Coach	2021–present

== Schedule ==
=== Regular season ===
Date	Time	Opponent	Site	Result
January 16	4:00 p.m.	Ohio State	Crisler Center; Ann Arbor, MI	W 197.225–196.000
January 22	5:30 p.m.	Minnesota	Crisler Center; Ann Arbor, MI	W 195.850–195.000
~~January 30~~	~~2:00 p.m.~~	~~at #26 Ohio State~~	~~St. John Arena~~; ~~Columbus, OH~~	Postponed
~~February 6~~	~~4:00 p.m.~~	~~at Illinois~~	~~Huff Hall~~; ~~Champaign, IL~~	Postponed
February 15	3:00 p.m.	Nebraska	Crisler Center; Ann Arbor, MI	W 197.650–195.350
~~February 19~~	~~7:00 p.m.~~	~~Maryland~~	~~Crisler Center~~; ~~Ann Arbor, MI~~	Cancelled
February 21	12:00 p.m.	Illinois	Huff Hall; Champaign, IL	W 197.375–196.650
February 27	2:00 p.m.	Big Five Meet (Note: Big Five Meet opponents: Iowa, Penn State and Rutgers. Michigan State withdrew due to COVID-19 protocols.)	Crisler Center; Ann Arbor, MI	2nd, 195.925
~~March 5–7~~	~~TBD~~	~~Michigan State~~	~~Jenison Fieldhouse~~; ~~East Lansing, MI~~	Cancelled
March 7	2:00 p.m.	Ohio State Quad (Note: Ohio State Quad opponents: Ohio State, Penn State and Rutgers)	Crisler Center; Ann Arbor, MI	1st, 195.025
March 12	5:00 p.m.	Maryland	Xfinity Center; College Park, MD	W 198.100–195.050
All times are in Eastern time

=== Postseason ===
Date	Time	Opponent	Site	Result
March 20	6:30 p.m.	Big Ten Conference Championships	Maturi Pavilion; Minneapolis, MN	2nd, 197.425
April 2	7:00 p.m.	NCAA Regional	WVU Coliseum; Morgantown, WV	1st, 197.650
April 3	7:00 p.m.	NCAA Regional Final	WVU Coliseum; Morgantown, WV	1st, 198.100
April 16	1:00 p.m.	NCAA Semifinal	Fort Worth Convention Center; Fort Worth, TX	1st, 197.8625
April 17	3:30 p.m.	NCAA Finals	Fort Worth Convention Center; Fort Worth, TX	1st, 198.2500
All times are in Eastern time

== Rankings ==
Ranking movements Legend: ██ Increase in ranking ██ Decrease in ranking — = Not ranked
	Week												
Poll	Pre	1	2	3	4	5	6	7	8	9	10	11	Final
RoadToNationals.com	5	—	3	7	7	8	8	5	5	4	3	4	1
