= Audrey Davis =

American artistic gymnast (born 2002)

- Full name: Audrey Davis
- Born: May 3, 2002 (age 24) Oakland, Florida
- Height: 160 cm (5 ft 3 in)

Gymnastics career
- Discipline: Women's artistic gymnastics
- Country represented: United States (2017–2018)
- College team: Oklahoma Sooners (2021–25)
- Club: WOGA
- Head coach: K.J. Kindler
- Former coach: Tatyana Shadenko; Yevgeny Marchenko
- Retired: April 24th, 2025
Medal record
Representing Oklahoma Sooners
NCAA Championships
Gold medal – first place	2022 Fort Worth	Team
Gold medal – first place	2023 Fort Worth	Team
Gold medal – first place	2024 Fort Worth	Uneven bars
Gold medal – first place	2024 Fort Worth	Balance beam
Gold medal – first place	2025 Fort Worth	Team
Silver medal – second place	2021 Fort Worth	Team
Silver medal – second place	2022 Fort Worth	Uneven bars

Audrey Davis (born May 3, 2002) is a former American artistic gymnast. She competed for the Oklahoma Sooners in NCAA gymnastics, where she was a 5 time national champion.

== Personal life ==
Davis is from Oakland, Florida where she is the daughter of Parker and Katherine Davis and has three siblings, Tanner, Samuel and Matthew. Her father died in 2018.

She majored in communications with minors in psychology and interior design at University of Oklahoma.

== Elite gymnastics career ==
=== Junior: 2016–2017 ===
Davis trained at World Olympic Gymnastics Academy and made her elite debut at the 2016 U.S. Classic.

The following year she competed at the 2017 U.S. Classic where she placed fourth in the all-around, fifth on uneven bars and balance beam and twelfth on vault. She advanced to her first National Championships where she finished fourth on uneven bars, sixth in the all-around, seventh on vault, and eighth on balance beam. Her sixth place finish in the all-around earned her an automatic spot on the USA national team.

=== Senior: 2018 ===
Davis made her senior elite debut at the WOGA Classic where she placed fourth on uneven bars, eighth in the all-around, ninth on vault and balance beam, and tenth on floor exercise. She next competed at the American Classic, placing fifth in the all-around; later that month she competed at the 2018 U.S. Classic where she placed fourth on uneven bars, sixth in the all-around, seventh on balance beam, and sixteenth on floor exercise. At the 2018 National Championships she placed thirteenth on balance beam, fourteenth in the all-around and on uneven bars, and fifteenth on floor exercise. Davis was named as a member of the 2018 senior national team.

== Collegiate gymnastics career ==
Davis originally committed to the Georgia GymDogs before switching to the Oklahoma Sooners after a coaching change at Georgia. She joined the Sooners in the fall of 2020 ahead of the 2021 NCAA season.

=== 2021 ===
Davis placed second at the Big12 Championships and helped Oklahoma finish second overall. At the 2021 NCAA Championships Davis was part of the team which finished second.

=== 2022 ===
At the 2022 NCAA Championships Davis placed second on bars and helped Oklahoma win the team title.

=== 2023 ===
Davis was bars champion and placed third in the all-around at the Big12 Championships, helping the team win the title. At the 2023 NCAA Championships Davis helped Oklahoma finish first as a team.

=== 2024 ===
Davis recorded her first career perfect 10 on bars on March 3 at TWU. At the Big 12 Championships Oklahoma scored a 198.950, setting the overall NCAA gymnastics team record with Davis placing second on bars. At the 2024 NCAA Championships Oklahoma did not qualify to the Four on the Floor final. However, Davis won both uneven bars and beam national titles.

Davis was named as one of six finalists for the AAI Award, which recognizes the top senior female gymnast in the nation for her dedication, leadership, and excellence in the sport alongside Haleigh Bryant, Luisa Blanco Maile O'Keefe, Gabby Wilson and Raena Worley.

=== 2025 ===
Davis announced she would return to Oklahoma for her fifth and final year. Oklahoma joined the Southeastern Conference (SEC) for the 2025 season. She finished the regular season ranked first on bars. At the SEC Championships, she helped Oklahoma finish second behind reigning national champions LSU. Individually she finished fourth on bars and fifth on beam.

Davis earned her second AAI Award finalist spot, alongside teammate Jordan Bowers, Jade Carey, Aleah Finnegan, Grace McCallum, and Leanne Wong. She ultimately lost to Carey.

At the 2025 NCAA Championships Davis helped Oklahoma advance to Four on the Floor and eventually win the team title.

Davis was nominated for the Honda Sports Award alongside Jordan Bowers, Jade Carey and Aleah Finnegan.

She announced her retirement from gymnastics on the 24th April 2025, finishing her NCAA career as a five time national champion, hitting 267 of 268 routines.

=== Career perfect 10.0 ===
Season	Date	Event	Meet
2024	March 3, 2024	Uneven Bars	TWU

=== NCAA Regular season ranking ===
Season	All-Around	Vault	Uneven Bars	Balance Beam	Floor Exercise
2021	N/A	35th	4th	31st	N/A
2022	15th	n/a	2nd	25th	38th
2023	19th	44th	6th	23rd	89th
2024	13th	N/A	2nd	16th	37th
2025	14th	60th	1st	24th	56th

== Competitive history ==
Year	Event	Team	AA	VT	UB	BB	FX
Junior
2016	U.S. Classic		31	28	25	33	29
2017	WOGA Classic		2nd place, silver medalist(s)	2nd place, silver medalist(s)	1st place, gold medalist(s)	3rd place, bronze medalist(s)	2nd place, silver medalist(s)
2017	U.S. Classic		4	12	5	5	33
2017	U.S. National Championships		6	7	4	8	17
Senior
2018	WOGA Classic		8	9	4	10	9
2018	International Gymnix		20				
2018	American Classic		5				
2018	U.S. Classic		6		4	7	16
2018	U.S. National Championships		14		14	13	15
NCAA
2021	Big 12 Championships	2nd place, silver medalist(s)			2nd place, silver medalist(s)		
2021	NCAA Championships	2nd place, silver medalist(s)					
2022	Big 12 Championships	1st place, gold medalist(s)			7	7	
2022	NCAA Championships	1st place, gold medalist(s)			2nd place, silver medalist(s)		
2023	Big 12 Championships	1st place, gold medalist(s)	3rd place, bronze medalist(s)		1st place, gold medalist(s)		
2023	NCAA Championships	1st place, gold medalist(s)					
2024	Big 12 Championships	1st place, gold medalist(s)			2nd place, silver medalist(s)	6	5
2024	NCAA Championships	6			1st place, gold medalist(s)	1st place, gold medalist(s)	
2025	SEC Championships	2nd place, silver medalist(s)			4	5	18
2025	NCAA Championships	1st place, gold medalist(s)			39	33	34

== Awards ==
Year	Award	Result	Ref
2024	AAI Award	Nominated	
2025	AAI Award	Nominated	
2025	Honda Sports Award	Nominated	
