= 2019 NCAA women's gymnastics tournament =

Collegiate gymnastics competition

- Venue: Fort Worth Convention Center (semi-finals and final)
- Location: Fort Worth, Texas
- Teams: 36

Medalists
| gold medal | Oklahoma |
| silver medal | LSU |
| bronze medal | UCLA |

The 2019 NCAA women's gymnastics tournament were held April 19–20, 2019, at the Fort Worth Convention Center in Fort Worth, Texas. The national championship has changed to a new format. The number of regions is reduced from six to four. Regional competitions took place on April 4–6. The top two teams from each region advanced to the championship competition at the Fort Worth Convention Center.

== Regional Championships ==
The top two teams from each region will move to the championship round, indicated in bold.

- **Baton Rouge, LA** (Pete Maravich Assembly Center, April 4–6)

Regional final teams: LSU* 197.500, Utah 197.250, Minnesota 196.900, Auburn 195.725

- **Ann Arbor, MI** (Crisler Center, April 4–6)

Regional final: UCLA* 198.075, Michigan 197.275, Alabama 197.225, Nebraska 196.650
Notes: Kyla Ross, UCLA, scored 10.000 on both the uneven bars and balance beam

- **Athens, GA** (Stegeman Coliseum, April 4–6)

Regional final teams: Oklahoma* 198.475, Georgia 198.050, California 197.675, Kentucky 197.600
Notes: Marissa Oakley, University of Georgia and Maggie Nichols, Oklahoma, scored 10.000 on uneven bars

- **Corvallis, OR** (Gill Coliseum, April 4–6)

Regional final teams: Denver* 197.375, Oregon St. 196.900, Florida 196.700, Boise St. 196.075

* – Denotes regional champions

== NCAA Championship ==
- **Semifinal I** (April 19, 12:00PM CDT)

| Team | Vault | Uneven bars | Balance beam | Floor | Totals |
|---|---|---|---|---|---|
| **UCLA** | 49.2875 | 49.4125 | 49.3625 | 49.6125 | **197.6750** |
| **LSU** | 49.4500 | 49.4375 | 49.1875 | 49.4375 | **197.5125** |
| Michigan | 49.1875 | 49.3000 | 49.3375 | 49.3750 | 197.2000 |
| Utah | 49.2250 | 49.3250 | 48.8625 | 49.3125 | 196.7250 |

- **Semifinal II** (April 19, 7:00PM CDT)

| Team | Vault | Uneven bars | Balance beam | Floor | Totals |
|---|---|---|---|---|---|
| **Oklahoma** | 49.4000 | 49.5625 | 49.2875 | 49.6000 | **197.8500** |
| **Denver** | 49.1000 | 49.3875 | 49.2875 | 49.2625 | **197.0375** |
| Oregon St. | 49.0875 | 49.2625 | 49.2500 | 49.3000 | 196.9000 |
| Georgia | 49.2375 | 49.2750 | 48.8625 | 49.0875 | 196.4625 |

Bold – Denotes Final Four teams (Session's top two teams)

=== Standings ===
- National Champion: Oklahoma - 198.3375
- 2nd Place: LSU - 197.8250
- 3rd Place: UCLA - 197.5375
- 4th Place: Denver - 197.0000

| Team | Vault | Uneven bars | Balance beam | Floor | Totals |
|---|---|---|---|---|---|
| **Oklahoma** | 49.6250 | 49.4500 | 49.6125 | 49.6500 | **198.3375** |
| LSU | 49.3750 | 49.4625 | 49.4625 | 49.5250 | 197.8250 |
| UCLA | 49.4250 | 49.4250 | 49.3875 | 49.3000 | 197.5375 |
| Denver | 49.2125 | 49.2375 | 49.3500 | 49.2000 | 197.0000 |

== Individual results ==
=== Medalists ===
| Event | Gold | Silver | Bronze |
|---|---|---|---|
| Individual all-around | Maggie Nichols (Oklahoma) | Lexy Ramler (Minnesota) Kyla Ross (UCLA) | N/A |
| Vault | Kennedi Edney (LSU) Derrian Gobourne (Auburn) Maggie Nichols (Oklahoma) Kyla Ross (UCLA) | N/A | N/A |
| Uneven bars | Sarah Finnegan (LSU) | Maggie Nichols (Oklahoma) Lexy Ramler (Minnesota) | N/A |
| Balance beam | Natalie Wojcik (Michigan) | Sarah Finnegan (LSU) | Katelyn Ohashi (UCLA) |
| Floor | Alicia Boren (Florida) Lynnzee Brown (Denver) Brenna Dowell (Oklahoma) Kyla Ross (UCLA) | N/A | N/A |

=== All-Around ===
| Rank | Gymnast | Team | Vault (gymnastics) | Uneven bars | Balance beam | Floor (gymnastics) | Total |
|---|---|---|---|---|---|---|---|
| 1st place, gold medalist(s) | Maggie Nichols | Oklahoma | 9.9500 | 9.9375 | 9.9000 | 9.9250 | 39.7125 |
| 2nd place, silver medalist(s) | Kyla Ross | UCLA | 9.9500 | 9.8625 | 9.9000 | 9.9500 | 39.6625 |
| 2nd place, silver medalist(s) | Lexy Ramler | Minnesota | 9.9250 | 9.9375 | 9.9125 | 9.8875 | 39.6625 |
| 4 | Sarah Finnegan | LSU | 9.8875 | 9.9500 | 9.9375 | 9.8750 | 39.6500 |
| 5 | Kennedi Edney | LSU | 9.9500 | 9.9250 | 9.8125 | 9.9125 | 39.6000 |
| 6 | Lynnzee Brown | Denver | 9.8500 | 9.9000 | 9.8750 | 9.9500 | 39.5750 |
| 7 | MyKayla Skinner | Utah | 9.9250 | 9.9125 | 9.7750 | 9.9375 | 39.5500 |
| 8 | Olivia Karas | Michigan | 9.8375 | 9.9000 | 9.8750 | 9.9250 | 39.5375 |
| 8 | Natalie Wojcik | Michigan | 9.8500 | 9.8375 | 9.9500 | 9.9000 | 39.5375 |
| 10 | Brenna Dowell | Oklahoma | 9.9000 | 9.8875 | 9.7375 | 9.9500 | 39.4750 |
| 11 | Sienna Crouse | Nebraska | 9.7875 | 9.8750 | 9.8500 | 9.8750 | 39.3875 |
| 11 | Maddie Karr | Denver | 9.8500 | 9.9125 | 9.7875 | 9.8375 | 39.3875 |
| 13 | Alicia Boren | Florida | 9.8125 | 9.8375 | 9.7750 | 9.9500 | 39.3750 |
| 13 | Rachel Dickson | Georgia | 9.8125 | 9.8875 | 9.8125 | 9.8625 | 39.3750 |
| 15 | Alex Hyland | Kentucky | 9.8625 | 9.7125 | 9.8625 | 9.8625 | 39.3000 |
| 15 | Alexandria Ruiz | Denver | 9.7625 | 9.8750 | 9.8375 | 9.8250 | 39.3000 |
| 17 | Sydney Snead | Georgia | 9.9000 | 9.9000 | 9.7250 | 9.7625 | 39.2875 |
| 18 | Kari Lee | Utah | 9.8375 | 9.7875 | 9.8000 | 9.8250 | 39.2500 |
| 19 | Anastasia Webb | Oklahoma | 9.8500 | 9.900 | 9.5875 | 9.9000 | 39.2375 |
| 20 | Mia Sundstorm | Denver | 9.8125 | 9.8500 | 9.5125 | 9.7625 | 38.9375 |
| 21 | McKenna Merrell-Giles | Utah | 9.9000 | 9.8750 | 9.0875 | 9.8750 | 38.7375 |

=== Event champions ===
Vault: Kyla Ross (UCLA), Kennedi Edney (LSU), Derrian Gobourne (Auburn), Maggie Nichols (Oklahoma) - 9.95

Uneven bars: Sarah Finnegan (LSU) - 9.95

Balance beam: Natalie Wojcik (Michigan) - 9.95

Floor exercise: Kyla Ross (UCLA), Alicia Boren (Florida), Lynnzee Brown (Denver), Brenna Dowell (Oklahoma) - 9.95
