= Lexy Ramler =

American artistic gymnast

- Full name: Alexyss Ramler
- Born: February 6, 1999 (age 27) Minnesota, U.S.

Gymnastics career
- Discipline: Women's artistic gymnastics
- College team: Minnesota Golden Gophers (2018–2022)
- Club: KidSport LLC
- Head coach: Jenny Hansen
- Retired: April 14, 2022
- Awards: AAI Award (2021)
Medal record
Representing Minnesota Golden Gophers
NCAA Championships
| Silver medal – second place | 2019 Fort Worth | All-around |
| Silver medal – second place | 2019 Fort Worth | Uneven bars |
| Silver medal – second place | 2022 Fort Worth | Uneven bars |

Alexyss "Lexy" Ramler (born February 6, 1999) is an American former artistic gymnast. She competed as an elite gymnast and barely missed qualification for the 2016 U.S. Olympic Trials. She then competed for the Minnesota Golden Gophers women's gymnastics team. At the 2019 NCAA Championships, she placed second in the all-around and on the uneven bars. She was a three-time Big Ten Gymnast of the Year and also finished second on the uneven bars at the 2022 NCAA Championships.

== Gymnastics career ==
=== Elite ===
Ramler began competing as a junior elite gymnast in 2013 and finished 30th in the all-around at the 2013 U.S. Classic. She qualified for the 2013 U.S. Championships and finished 29th in the all-around. At the 2014 International Gymnix, she finished 11th in the all-around and ninth in the floor exercise final. She tied for 21st place in the all-around at the 2014 U.S. Classic. At the 2014 U.S. Championships, she finished 17th in the all-around.

Ramler became age-eligible for senior elite competitions in 2015. She placed eighth in the senior all-around at the 2015 U.S. Classic. She made her senior international debut at the 2016 International Gymnix and won the all-around title in the challenge division. She also won a gold medal in the balance beam final and a bronze medal in the uneven bars final. She tied with Lauren Navarro for the all-around title at the 2016 American Classic. She then finished eighth in the all-around at the 2016 U.S. Classic. At the 2016 U.S. Championships, she finished 14th in the all-around and was one spot away from qualifying for the Olympic Trials.

=== NCAA ===
Ramler joined the Minnesota Golden Gophers women's gymnastics team and began competing in the 2018 season. That year, she was named the Big Ten Freshman of the Year. She advanced to the 2018 NCAA Championships as an individual and earned a second team All-American honor on the balance beam. She broke the Minnesota school record in the all-around during the 2019 season, scoring a 39.725 against the Maryland Terrapins. She tied with UCLA's Kyla Ross for second in the all-around at the 2019 NCAA Championships. Additionally, she tied with Maggie Nichols for second place on the uneven bars and received four All-American honors.

Ramler scored the first perfect 10 of her career at the 2020 quad meet at Rutgers. She scored another perfect 10 the next week against Illinois. She was named the Big Ten Gymnast of the Year for the second year in a row and was ranked first in the nation on the balance beam when the season was ended due to the COVID-19 pandemic.

At the 2021 Big Five Meet, Ramler broke her own program all-around record with a total score of 39.850, and she scored her first perfect 10 on the vault. Later that season, she scored another perfect 10 on the balance beam. She won the all-around and team titles at the 2021 Big Ten Championships and was named Big Ten Gymnast of the Year for the third consecutive time. She helped Minnesota reach the semifinals of the 2021 NCAA Championships. On April 21, 2021, Ramler was awarded the AAI Award, given to the most outstanding senior female gymnast in the NCAA.

Ramler was eligible to compete for a fifth year in the NCAA due to the COVID-19 pandemic and announced her return on May 4, 2021. She scored a perfect 10 on the balance beam in a win against Iowa where Minnesota set a program record team total. At the 2022 Big Ten Championships, she finished second in the all-around and won the uneven bars and balance beam titles. She tied for second place on the uneven bars at the 2022 NCAA Championships and helped Minnesota in finish sixth place, a program record.

==== Career perfect 10.0 ====
Lexy Ramler's Perfect 10 Scores
| Season | Date | Event | Meet |
|---|---|---|---|
| 2020 | January 18, 2020 | Balance beam | Minnesota @ Rutgers quad |
| 2020 | January 25, 2020 | Balance beam | Minnesota vs Illinois |
| 2021 | February 26, 2021 | Vault | Big Fives |
| 2021 | March 13, 2021 | Balance beam | Minnesota @ Illinois |
| 2022 | February 25, 2022 | Balance beam | Minnesota vs Iowa |
