= Minnesota Golden Gophers gymnastics =

Minnesota Golden Gophers gymnastics refers to one of the following:

- Minnesota Golden Gophers men's gymnastics
- Minnesota Golden Gophers women's gymnastics
