= 2017 American Cup =

- Venue: Prudential Center
- Location: Newark, New Jersey, U.S.
- Dates: March 4, 2017
- Competitors: 18 from 10 nations

Medalists
gold medal	(United States) Ragan Smith (United States) Yul Moldauer
silver medal	(Japan) Asuka Teramoto (Ukraine) Oleg Verniaiev
bronze medal	(France) Mélanie de Jesus dos Santos (United States) Akash Modi

The 2017 AT&T American Cup was part of the World Cup circuit in artistic gymnastics.

== Participants ==
NOC	Women (WAG)	Men (MAG)
United States	Ragan Smith	Yul Moldauer
United States; Wildcard	Riley McCusker	Akash Modi
Australia	Emily Whitehead	—N/a
China	Xie Yufen	Sun Wei
France	Mélanie de Jesus dos Santos	—N/a
Germany	Kim Bui	Lukas Dauser
Great Britain	Amy Tinkler	Sam Oldham
Japan	Asuka Teramoto	Ryōhei Katō
Netherlands	Tisha Volleman	Bart Deurloo
Switzerland	—N/a	Eddy Yusof
Ukraine	—N/a	Oleg Verniaiev

== Results ==
=== Women ===
Rank	Gymnast	Vault (gymnastics)	Uneven bars	Balance beam	Floor (gymnastics)	Total
1st place, gold medalist(s)	Ragan Smith (USA)	14.433	14.400	13.266	14.000	56.099
2nd place, silver medalist(s)	Asuka Teramoto (JPN)	13.766	13.766	13.633	13.066	54.231
3rd place, bronze medalist(s)	Mélanie de Jesus dos Santos (FRA)	13.466	13.300	14.233	12.900	53.899
4	Kim Bui (GER)	13.500	14.533	12.466	13.133	53.632
5	Riley McCusker (USA)	13.766	13.100	12.600	13.500	52.966
6	Xie Yufen (CHN)	13.100	13.833	12.700	11.966	51.599
7	Tisha Volleman (NED)	13.600	11.866	12.200	11.600	49.266
8	Emily Whitehead (AUS)	13.433	13.066	11.300	10.600	48.399
9	Amy Tinkler (GBR)	13.700	13.300	12.566	–	DNF

=== Men ===
Rank	Gymnast	Floor (gymnastics)	Pommel horse	Rings (gymnastics)	Vault (gymnastics)	Parallel bars	Horizontal bar	Total
1st place, gold medalist(s)	Yul Moldauer (USA)	14.566	14.000	14.300	14.466	14.866	13.733	85.931
2nd place, silver medalist(s)	Oleg Verniaiev (UKR)	13.300	14.700	14.633	14.433	15.033	13.600	85.699
3rd place, bronze medalist(s)	Akash Modi (USA)	13.833	13.466	14.066	14.200	15.033	13.800	84.398
4	Bart Deurloo (NED)	12.500	11.666	13.633	14.433	13.400	14.533	80.165
5	Eddy Yusof (SUI)	12.466	13.300	13.966	14.700	13.566	12.166	80.164
6	Ryōhei Katō (JPN)	13.600	14.066	14.100	14.500	12.733	11.066	80.065
7	Sun Wei (CHN)	13.000	12.900	13.133	13.500	13.633	13.866	80.032
8	Sam Oldham (GBR)	12.633	13.100	13.500	14.133	14.333	11.700	79.399
9	Lukas Dauser (GER)	13.000	11.400	12.133	13.100	13.300	13.066	75.999

== Nastia Liukin Cup ==
The Nastia Liukin Cup
- Venue: Prudential Center
- Location: Newark, New Jersey, U.S.
- Dates: March 3, 2017
- Competitors: 36

The 8th annual Nastia Liukin Cup was held in conjunction with the 2017 American Cup. Since its inception in 2010, the competition has always been held on the Friday night before the American Cup, in the same arena.

=== Medal winners ===
Event	Gold	Silver	Bronze
Senior
All-around	Kai Rivers	Rachael Lukacs	Andrea Li
Junior
All-around	Carly Bauman	Rose Casali	Lali Dekanoidze

=== Notable competitors ===
Senior competitors Natalie Wojcik and Anastasia Webb would go on to become multi-NCAA champions. Lynnzee Brown would go on to compete for Haiti at the 2024 Olympic Games.
