= Kylee Botterman =

American artistic gymnast

- Full name: Kylee Botterman
- Born: May 12, 1989 (age 37) Hinsdale, Illinois, United States
- Height: 1.6 m (5 ft 3 in)

Gymnastics career
- Discipline: Women's artistic gymnastics
- College team: Michigan Wolverines
- Club: United
- Head coach: Bev Plocki
- Retired: 2011

Kylee Botterman Kolarik (born Kylee Botterman; May 12, 1989) is an American former collegiate artistic gymnast. A member of the Michigan Wolverines women's gymnastics program from 2008 to 2011, Botterman is a nine-time All-American, the 2011 NCAA all-around champion, AAI Award and Honda Award recipient.

== Early life ==
Kylee Botterman was born on May 12, 1989, to Hendrick III 'Hank', a construction safety director and Laurie (née Criscione) Botterman (b. May 1960). The youngest of three daughters, all of whom are involved in gymnastics, Kylee's sisters are Danyelle 'Danye' Mishel and Marijka Lauren Liscovitz (née Botterman) (b. June 21, 1987); who are both former Illinois Fighting Illini gymnastics team members. Danye graduated in 2007, and has since married and had children. Marijka graduated in 2009.

== Personal life ==
Botterman married professional ice hockey player Chad Kolarik in August 2011. Together they have one son, Christian.
