= Chad Kolarik =

American ice hockey player

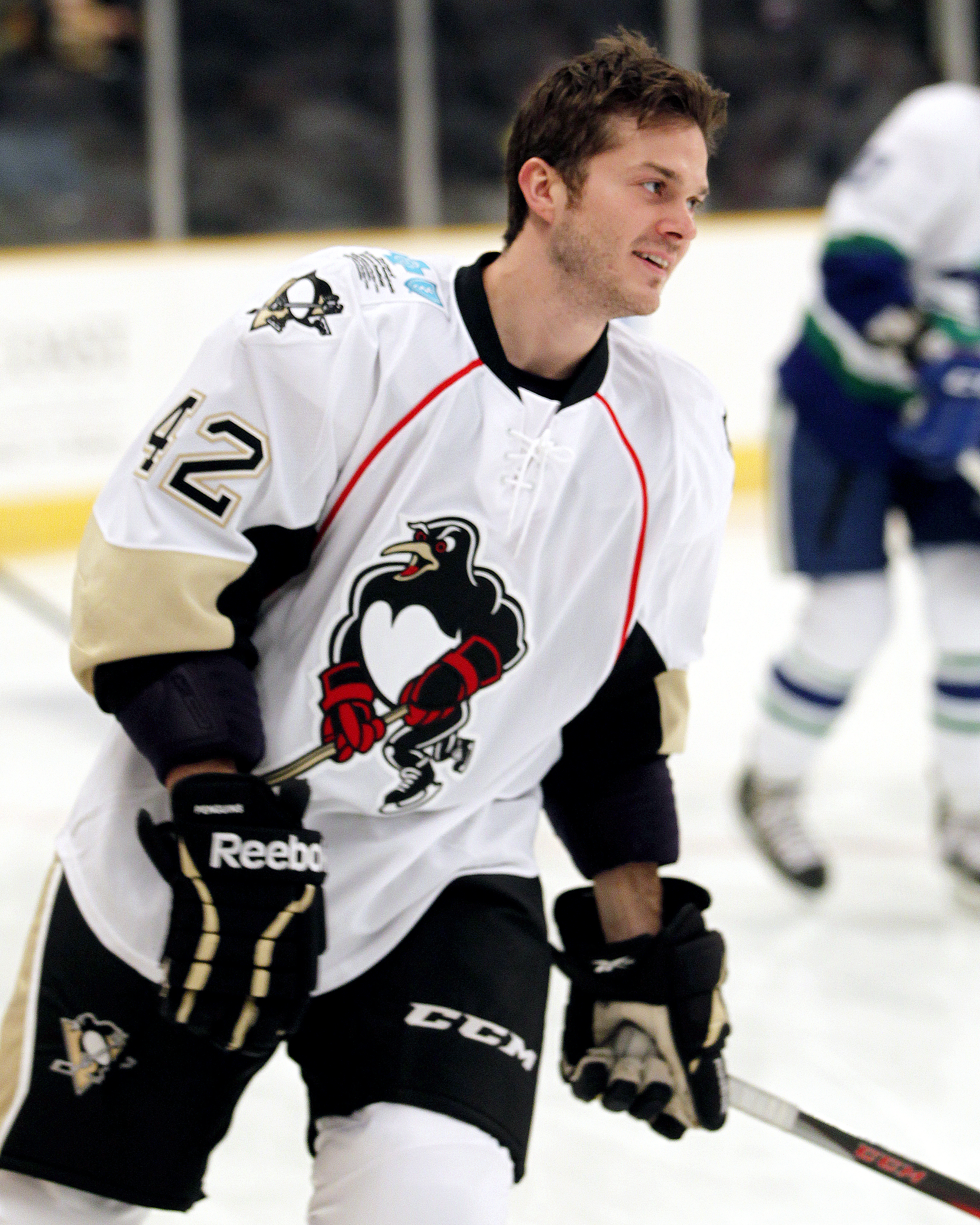
- Kolarik at the 2013 AHL All-Star Game
- Born: January 26, 1986 (age 40) Abington, Pennsylvania, U.S.
- Height: 5 ft 11 in (180 cm)
- Weight: 185 lb (84 kg; 13 st 3 lb)
- Position: Center
- Shot: Right
- Played for: Columbus Blue Jackets; New York Rangers; Linköpings HC; Avangard Omsk; Kloten Flyers; Adler Mannheim; EC Red Bull Salzburg
- National team: United States
- NHL draft: 199th overall, 2004; Phoenix Coyotes
- Playing career: 2008–2020
- Coaching career: 2021–present

Chad E. Kolarik (born January 26, 1986) is an American ice hockey coach and former player. He is currently serving as an assistant coach to the USA Hockey National Team Development Program. He played in the National Hockey League (NHL) with the Columbus Blue Jackets and New York Rangers.

== Playing career ==
As a youth, Kolarik played in the 2000 Quebec International Pee-Wee Hockey Tournament with the Philadelphia Flyers minor ice hockey team.

Kolarik was drafted 199th overall in the 2004 NHL entry draft by the Phoenix Coyotes while he was playing for the University of Michigan. After completing his senior year with the Wolverines in the 2007–08 season, Chad signed a three-year entry-level contract with the Coyotes on April 13, 2008. He was then assigned to their affiliate, the San Antonio Rampage of the AHL, for the Calder Cup playoffs.

On March 3, 2010, Kolarik was traded from the Coyotes to the Columbus Blue Jackets in exchange for Alexandre Picard. He made his NHL debut for the Blue Jackets on April 5, 2010 against the St. Louis Blues.

On November 11, 2010, Kolarik was traded from the Blue Jackets to the New York Rangers in exchange for Dane Byers. He earned his first NHL point for the Rangers with an assist on a goal by Brandon Prust against the Carolina Hurricanes on January 20, 2011.

There was speculation that Kolarik would make the New York Rangers squad in the 2011–12 season, but he missed the entire year after he tore his ACL in training camp.

On January 24, 2013, Kolarik was traded from the Rangers to the Pittsburgh Penguins in exchange for Benn Ferriero.

After a strong ending of the 2012–13 season with the Wilkes-Barre/Scranton Penguins, Kolarik chose to move overseas, signing a two-year deal with Linköpings HC of the Swedish Hockey League. During the final season of his contract in Sweden, Kolarik sought a release in October, 2014, to sign a contract with Russian club, Avangard Omsk of the Kontinental Hockey League.

On April 30, 2015, he agreed to a one-year contract with the Kloten Flyers of the Swiss NLA. Kolarik made 38 NLA appearances for the Kloten squad, scoring 16 goals and assisting on twelve more. He left the team after the 2015–16 season and moved to Germany, signing with Adler Mannheim of the Deutsche Eishockey Liga (DEL).

Helping Adler Mannheim claim the DEL championship in the 2018–19 season, Kolarik left as a free agent for neighbouring league, the EBEL, signing a one-year deal with Austrian outfit, EC Red Bull Salzburg, on May 1, 2019. In his lone season in the EBEL, Kolarik posted 43 points in 48 games as the team's second leading scorer. He collected 4 playoff points in 3 games before the season was ended prematurely due to the COVID-19 pandemic.

On July 2, 2020, Kolarik ended his tenure with Red Bull Salzburg by announcing his retirement from professional hockey after 12 years.

== Personal life ==
He married University of Michigan gymnastic Kylee Botterman in August 2011 in Botterman's hometown of Chicago, Illinois. Kolarik proposed to Botterman in December 2010 after a three-year, long-distance relationship. Together they have one son, Christian.

== Career statistics ==
=== Regular season and playoffs ===
			Regular season					Playoffs
Season	Team	League	GP	G	A	Pts	PIM	GP	G	A	Pts	PIM
2002–03	U.S. NTDP U17	USDP	21	14	10	24	4	—	—	—	—	—
2002–03	U.S. NTDP U18	NAHL	44	16	22	38	43	—	—	—	—	—
2003–04	U.S. NTDP U18	NAHL	10	3	4	7	4	—	—	—	—	—
2003–04	U.S. NTDP U18	USDP	45	18	20	38	16	—	—	—	—	—
2004–05	University of Michigan	CCHA	42	18	17	35	53	—	—	—	—	—
2005–06	University of Michigan	CCHA	41	12	26	38	30	—	—	—	—	—
2006–07	University of Michigan	CCHA	41	18	27	45	24	—	—	—	—	—
2007–08	University of Michigan	CCHA	39	30	26	56	24	—	—	—	—	—
2007–08	San Antonio Rampage	AHL	—	—	—	—	—	7	4	2	6	0
2008–09	San Antonio Rampage	AHL	76	20	30	50	47	—	—	—	—	—
2009–10	San Antonio Rampage	AHL	59	17	18	35	41	—	—	—	—	—
2009–10	Syracuse Crunch	AHL	17	9	6	15	14	—	—	—	—	—
2009–10	Columbus Blue Jackets	NHL	2	0	0	0	0	—	—	—	—	—
2010–11	Springfield Falcons	AHL	13	4	6	10	18	—	—	—	—	—
2010–11	Hartford Wolf Pack/CT Whale	AHL	36	17	14	31	36	3	3	2	5	0
2010–11	New York Rangers	NHL	4	0	1	1	2	—	—	—	—	—
2012–13	Connecticut Whale	AHL	41	16	19	35	38	—	—	—	—	—
2012–13	Wilkes–Barre/Scranton Penguins	AHL	35	15	18	33	17	15	5	6	11	17
2013–14	Linköpings HC	SHL	53	30	18	48	64	14	6	4	10	16
2014–15	Linköpings HC	SHL	11	4	3	7	4	—	—	—	—	—
2014–15	Avangard Omsk	KHL	29	7	9	16	10	12	4	4	8	8
2015–16	Kloten Flyers	NLA	36	15	12	27	14	2	1	0	1	0
2016–17	Adler Mannheim	DEL	50	25	16	41	38	7	3	6	9	2
2017–18	Adler Mannheim	DEL	47	23	23	46	14	10	0	8	8	8
2018–19	Adler Mannheim	DEL	46	21	27	48	6	14	3	8	11	8
2019–20	EC Red Bull Salzburg	EBEL	48	20	23	43	16	3	1	3	4	0
AHL totals			277	98	111	209	211	25	12	10	22	17
NHL totals			6	0	1	1	2	—	—	—	—	—
DEL totals			143	69	66	135	58	31	6	22	28	18

=== International ===
Year	Team	Event	Result	GP	G	A	Pts	PIM
2004	United States	WJC18	2nd place, silver medalist(s)	6	1	3	4	2
2018	United States	OG	7th	2	0	0	0	0
Junior totals				6	1	3	4	2
Senior totals				2	0	0	0	0

== Awards and honors ==
Award	Year
College
All-CCHA First Team	2008
AHCA West Second-Team All-American	2008
AHL
All-Star Game	2013
DEL
Champion (Adler Mannheim)	2019
