= 2011 NCAA women's gymnastics championships =

American college gymnastics competition

2011 NCAA Women's Gymnastics Championships
- Venue: Wolstein Center
- Location: Cleveland, Ohio
- Dates: April 15–17

Medalists
gold medal	Alabama
silver medal	UCLA
bronze medal	Oklahoma

The 2011 NCAA Women's Gymnastics Championship was held at the Wolstein Center, in Cleveland, Ohio on April 15–17, 2011. Twelve teams from the six regional meets advanced to the NCAA Division I national team and individual titles. The Alabama Crimson Tide were the 2011 national champions.

Regional Championships were held on April 2, 2011 at the following six sites:

- Ann Arbor Regional – Crisler Arena, 6 p.m. (ET) Ann Arbor, Michigan; Host: University of Michigan
  - Finish: Michigan (1st), Kent State (2nd), Ohio State, Minnesota, Stanford, Iowa State
- Athens Regional – Stegeman Coliseum, 4 p.m. (ET) Athens, Georgia; Host: University of Georgia
  - Finish: UCLA (1st), Georgia (2nd), LSU, North Carolina State, Maryland, West Virginia
- Corvallis Regional – Gill Coliseum, 7 p.m. (ET) Corvallis, Oregon; Host: Oregon State University
  - Finish: Oregon State (1st), Nebraska (2nd), Michigan State, San Jose State, Iowa, Southern Utah
- Denver Regional – Magness Arena, 8 p.m. (ET) Denver, Colorado; Host: University of Denver
  - Finish: Arkansas (1st), Florida (2nd), Boise State, Denver, Arizona, Brigham Young
- Norman Regional – Lloyd Noble Center, 5 p.m. (ET) Norman, Oklahoma; Host: University of Oklahoma
  - Finish: Oklahoma (1st), Utah (2nd), Washington, North Carolina, New Hampshire, Missouri
- Tuscaloosa Regional – Coleman Coliseum, 7 p.m. (ET) Tuscaloosa, Alabama; Host: University of Alabama, Tuscaloosa
  - Finish: Alabama (1st), Illinois (2nd), Penn State, Auburn, Kentucky, Central Michigan

NCAA Women's Gymnastics Championship:

- NCAA Championships, Cleveland, Ohio, April 15:
  - Afternoon session (12:00 pm ET) – No. 2 seed UCLA, No. 3 Oklahoma (1st), No. 6 Michigan, No. 7 Georgia, No. 10 Arkansas and No. 11 Illinois
  - Evening session (6 pm ET) – No. 1 seed Alabama (1st), No. 4 Oregon State, No. 5 Florida, No. 8 Utah, No. 9 Nebraska and No. 12 and host team Kent State.
- NCAA Championship (Super Six Finals), Cleveland, Ohio, April 16 (4 p.m. ET):
  - Oklahoma, Michigan, UCLA, Alabama (1st), Nebraska, Utah
- Individual Event Finals – Cleveland, Ohio, Saturday, April 17 (1 p.m.):
  - Vault – 1st, Marissa King, University of Florida, 9.8750; 2nd, Madison Mooring, University of Oklahoma, 9.8250; 3rd, Erin Davis, University of Nebraska, 9.8188
  - Uneven Parallel Bars – 1st, Kat Ding, University of Georgia, 9.9125; 2nd, Jen Kesler, Oregon State University, 9.8750; 3rd, Sarah DeMeo, University of Alabama, 9.8625; 3rd, Makayla Stambaugh, Oregon State University, 9.8625; 3rd, Monique DeLaTorre, UCLA, 9.8625
  - Balance Beam – 1st, Sam Peszek, UCLA, 9.90; 2nd, Kayla Hoffman, University of Alabama, 9.8875; 2nd, Aisha Gerber, UCLA, 9.8875
  - Floor Exercise – 1st, Geralen Stack-Eaton, University of Alabama, 9.9375; 2nd, Maranda Smith, University of Florida, 9.9000; 2nd, Kylee Botterman, University of Michigan, 9.9000; 2nd, Brittani McCullough, UCLA, 9.9000
  - All around - Kylee Botterman, Michigan, 39.575

== Champions ==
Event	Gold	Silver	Bronze
Team	Alabama Crimson Tide; Becca Alexin; Olivia Carisella; Alyssa Chapman; Sarah DeMeo; Ria Domier; Lindsey Fowler; Marissa Gutierrez; Kayla Hoffman; Kim Jacob; Megan Mashburn; Diandra Milliner; Jordan Moore; Ashley Priess; Geralen Stack-Eaton; Rachel Terry; Hannah Toussaint	UCLA Bruins; Kaelie Baer; Olivia Courtney; Monique De La Torre; Tauny Frattone; Aisha Gerber; Danielle Greig; Elyse Hopfner-Hibbs; Tiffany Hyland; Kassidy Kozai; Talia Kushynski; Brittani McCullough; Sam Peszek; Alyssa Pritchett; Mizuki Sato; Sydney Sawa; Courtney Shannon; Allison Taylor; Niki Tom; Lichelle Wong; Vanessa Zamarripa	Oklahoma Sooners; Lauren Alexander; Hope Bruce; Candace Cindell; Megan Ferguson; Natasha Kelley; Madison Mooring; Kayla Nowak; Brie Olson; Nitya Ramaswami; Natalie Ratcliff; Melanie Root; Taylor Spears; Sara Stone; Hayden Ward
All-Around	Kylee Botterman (Michigan)	Kayla Hoffman (Alabama)	Geralen Stack-Eaton (Alabama), Cassidy McComb (Georgia)
Vault	Marissa King (Florida)	Madison Mooring (Oklahoma)	Erin Davis (Nebraska)
Uneven Bars	Kat Ding (Georgia)	Jen Kesler (Oregon State)	Makayla Stambaugh (Oregon State), Monique De La Torre (UCLA), Sarah DeMeo (Alabama)
Balance Beam	Sam Peszek (UCLA)	Kayla Hoffman (Alabama), Maranda Smith (Florida), Kylee Botterman (Michigan)	Jaime Pisani (Arkansas), Alaina Johnson (Florida)
Floor Exercise	Geralen Stack-Eaton (Alabama)	Brittani McCullough (UCLA), Maranda Smith (Florida), Kylee Botterman (Michigan)	n/a

Final Team Standings:

- 1. Alabama, 197.650
- 2. UCLA, 197.375
- 3. Oklahoma, 197.250
- 4. Nebraska, 196.725
- 5. Utah, 196.500
- 6. Michigan, 196.425
- 7. Florida, 196.125
- 7. Oregon State, 196.100
- 9. Arkansas, 195.450
- 9. Georgia, 195.450
- 11. Illinois, 195.100
- 12. Kent State, 195.000
