= 2021 NCAA women's gymnastics tournament =

American college gymnastics competition

2021 NCAA Women's Gymnastics Championships
- Venue: Dickies Arena
- Location: Fort Worth, Texas
- Dates: April 16–17, 2021
- Competitors: Florida; Oklahoma; LSU; Michigan; Utah; Minnesota; Alabama; California
- Teams: 8
- Winning score: 198.2500

Medalists
gold medal	Michigan
silver medal	Oklahoma
bronze medal	Utah

Champion
- Michigan

The 2021 NCAA Women's Gymnastics Championships were held from April 16–17, 2021 at the Dickies Arena in Fort Worth, Texas. The semifinals and the national championship were televised on ESPN2 and ABC, respectively.

== Regional championships ==
The top two teams from each region moved to the championship round, indicated in bold. The regional final competition began at 7 p.m. local time, April 3.

- **Athens, Georgia** (April 1–3)

Regional final teams: Florida* 197.700, Minnesota 197.425, Denver 197.275, North Carolina State 196.150

- **Morgantown, West Virginia** (April 1–3)

Regional final teams: Michigan* 198.100, California 197.750, UCLA 197.275, Ohio State 195.625

- **Salt Lake City, Utah** (April 1–3)

Regional final teams: Utah* 197.925, LSU 197.750, Arizona State 197.600, Kentucky 197.600

- **Tuscaloosa, Alabama** (April 1–3)

Regional final teams: Oklahoma* 198.175, Alabama 197.575, Arkansas 196.700, Missouri 196.550

* – Denotes regional champions

== NCAA Championship ==
The top two teams from each semifinal advanced to the National Championship, which was televised live on ABC on April 17 at 3:30 pm ET.

Semifinal I - April 16 1PM ET
School	Vault	Bars	Beam	Floor	Total
**Michigan**	49.3500	49.3875	49.4750	49.6500	**197.8625**
**Florida**	49.2250	49.2375	49.3875	49.5875	**197.4375**
California	49.1500	49.3500	49.4375	49.4250	197.3625
Minnesota	49.3875	49.1250	49.2125	49.4625	197.1875

Semifinal II - April 16 6PM ET
School	Vault	Bars	Beam	Floor	Total
**Oklahoma**	49.5250	49.4000	49.5250	49.6375	**198.0875**
**Utah**	49.2375	49.5125	49.2500	49.6000	**197.6000**
Alabama	49.2875	49.3125	49.3875	49.5875	197.5750
LSU	49.5125	49.3750	49.1750	49.5000	197.5625

=== Standings ===
Rank	Team	Vault (gymnastics)	Uneven bars	Balance beam	Floor (gymnastics)	Total
1st place, gold medalist(s)	**Michigan**	49.6500	49.4875	49.4875	49.6250	**198.2500**
1st place, gold medalist(s)	Sierra Brooks	9.9750	9.9250	9.9625	9.9125	39.7750
1st place, gold medalist(s)	Natalie Wojcik	9.9375	9.8625	9.9875	9.9500	39.7375
1st place, gold medalist(s)	Abby Heiskell	9.9750	9.9125	9.9250	9.9125	39.7250
1st place, gold medalist(s)	Gabby Wilson	9.8875	9.8375	9.7500	9.9375	39.4125
1st place, gold medalist(s)	Carly Bauman		9.8625	9.8500	9.8125	29.5250
1st place, gold medalist(s)	Abby Brenner		9.9250			9.9250
1st place, gold medalist(s)	Nicoletta Koulos				9.9125	9.9125
1st place, gold medalist(s)	Reyna Guggino	9.8750				9.8750
1st place, gold medalist(s)	Naomi Morrison	9.8750				9.8750
1st place, gold medalist(s)	Lauren Farley			9.7625		9.7625
2nd place, silver medalist(s)	**Oklahoma**	49.4750	49.5625	49.4875	49.5375	**198.1625**
2nd place, silver medalist(s)	Anastasia Webb	9.8750	9.9375	9.9250	9.9625	39.7000
2nd place, silver medalist(s)	Olivia Trautman	9.9625	9.9125	9.8750	9.9375	39.6875
2nd place, silver medalist(s)	Audrey Davis	9.8500	9.9000	9.8875		29.6375
2nd place, silver medalist(s)	Evy Schoepfer	9.9375			9.9000	19.8375
2nd place, silver medalist(s)	Jordan Draper		9.9375		9.8875	19.8250
2nd place, silver medalist(s)	Ragan Smith		9.9000	9.9000		19.8000
2nd place, silver medalist(s)	Katherine LeVasseur	9.8375	9.8625			19.7000
2nd place, silver medalist(s)	Allie Stern	9.9500				9.9500
2nd place, silver medalist(s)	Carly Woodard			9.9000		9.9000
2nd place, silver medalist(s)	Bell Johnson				9.8500	9.8500
2nd place, silver medalist(s)	Emma LaPinta				9.8500	9.8500
2nd place, silver medalist(s)	Jenna Dunn			9.0625		9.0625
3rd place, bronze medalist(s)	**Utah**	49.3875	49.4250	49.7000	49.4750	**197.9875**
3rd place, bronze medalist(s)	Maile O'Keefe	9.8375	9.9375	9.9875	9.9250	39.6875
3rd place, bronze medalist(s)	Abby Paulson		9.8625	9.9375	9.8750	29.6750
3rd place, bronze medalist(s)	Cristal Isa	9.8250	9.9000	9.9375		29.6625
3rd place, bronze medalist(s)	Alexia Burch	9.9375	9.8375	9.8625		29.6375
3rd place, bronze medalist(s)	Lucy Stanhope	9.8000		9.9000	9.8500	29.5500
3rd place, bronze medalist(s)	Jaedyn Rucker	9.9875			9.9250	19.9125
3rd place, bronze medalist(s)	Adrienne Randall			9.9375	9.8625	19.8000
3rd place, bronze medalist(s)	Emilie LeBlanc		9.8875			9.8875
3rd place, bronze medalist(s)	Sydney Soloski				9.8875	9.8875
3rd place, bronze medalist(s)	Alani Sabado		9.8125			9.8125
3rd place, bronze medalist(s)	Cammy Hall	9.8000				9.8000
4	**Florida**	49.3625	49.4625	48.7625	49.5500	**197.1375**
4	Megan Skaggs	9.8625	9.9375	9.8625	9.9000	39.5625
4	Alyssa Baumann	9.8000	9.8875	9.9250	9.9000	39.5125
4	Ellie Lazzari	9.8250	9.8875	9.9125	9.8500	39.4750
4	Trinity Thomas	9.9250	9.9000	9.1750	9.9500	38.9500
4	Payton Richards		9.8500	9.0375	9.8375	28.7250
4	Nya Reed	9.8875			9.9500	19.8375
4	Savannah Schoenherr	9.8625	8.4500			18.3125
4	Leah Clapper			9.8875		9.8875

== Individual results ==
=== Medalists ===
Event	Gold	Silver	Bronze
Individual all-around	Anastasia Webb (Oklahoma)	Sierra Brooks (Michigan) Luisa Blanco (Alabama)	Not awarded
Vault	Anastasia Webb (Oklahoma) Haleigh Bryant (LSU)	Not awarded	Ona Loper (Minnesota)
Uneven bars	Maile O'Keefe (Utah) Maya Bordas (California)	Not awarded	Luisa Blanco (Alabama)
Balance beam	Luisa Blanco (Alabama)	Sierra Brooks (Michigan)	Ragan Smith (Oklahoma) Anastasia Webb (Oklahoma)
Floor	Anastasia Webb (Oklahoma) Lexi Graber (Alabama) Maile O'Keefe (Utah)	Not awarded	

=== All-around ===
Rank	Gymnast	Team	Vault (gymnastics)	Uneven bars	Balance beam	Floor (gymnastics)	Total
1st place, gold medalist(s)	Anastasia Webb	Oklahoma	9.9750	9.9125	9.9375	9.9625	39.7875
2nd place, silver medalist(s)	Sierra Brooks	Michigan	9.8250	9.9250	9.9500	9.9500	39.6500
2nd place, silver medalist(s)	Luisa Blanco	Alabama	9.8000	9.9375	9.9625	9.9500	39.6500
4	Ona Loper	Minnesota	9.9625	9.8750	9.8750	9.9250	39.6375
5	Olivia Trautman	Oklahoma	9.8875	9.9000	9.9125	9.9250	39.6250
5	Haleigh Bryant	LSU	9.9750	9.8500	9.9250	9.8750	39.6250
7	Kennedy Hambrick	Arkansas	9.8875	9.9000	9.9125	9.9125	39.6125
8	Gabby Wilson	Michigan	9.8750	9.9000	9.8875	9.9375	39.6000
8	Kiya Johnson	LSU	9.9500	9.8500	9.8875	9.9125	39.6000
10	Abby Heiskell	Michigan	9.9000	9.8500	9.9000	9.9375	39.5875
11	Trinity Thomas	Florida	9.8500	9.8750	9.9125	9.9250	39.5625
11	Lexy Ramler	Minnesota	9.8750	9.8875	9.9250	9.8750	39.5625
11	Maile O'Keefe	Utah	9.8125	9.9500	9.8375	9.9625	39.5625
14	Megan Skaggs	Florida	9.8750	9.8875	9.8875	9.9000	39.5500
14	Chae Campbell	UCLA	9.8500	9.8375	9.9250	9.9375	39.5500
16	Nevaeh DeSouza	California	9.8875	9.8000	9.9125	9.9250	39.5250
17	Cristal Isa	Utah	9.8375	9.9000	9.8750	9.9000	39.5125
18	Ellie Lazzari	Florida	9.8500	9.8500	9.8750	9.9125	39.4875
19	Andi Li	California	9.8375	9.8875	9.8500	9.8875	39.4625
20	Hannah Scharf	ASU	9.8375	9.8875	9.8250	9.8625	39.4125
21	Emily Gaskins	Alabama	9.8000	9.7875	9.8750	9.8375	39.3000
22	Lynnzee Brown	Denver	9.3375	9.9000	9.9125	9.9375	39.0875
23	Alyona Shchennikova	LSU	9.8375	9.9000	9.4375	9.8875	39.0625
24	Natalie Wojcik	Michigan	9.8750	9.0000	9.8875	9.9250	38.6875
