= Samantha Peszek =

American artistic gymnast (born 1991)

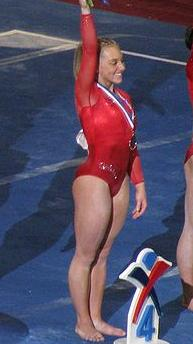
- Peszek (age 16) at the 2008 U.S. nationals

Personal information
- Full name: Samantha Nicole Peszek
- Nickname: Sam
- Born: December 14, 1991 (age 34) Indianapolis, Indiana, U.S.
- Height: 5 ft (152 cm)

Gymnastics career
- Discipline: Women's artistic gymnastics
- Country represented: United States; (2004–2010)
- College team: UCLA Bruins
- Club: Sharp's Gymnastics Academy
- Head coach: Marvin Sharp
- Former coach: Peter Zhao
- Retired: April 19, 2015
Medal record
Women's artistic gymnastics
Representing the United States
Olympic Games
Silver medal – second place	2008 Beijing	Team
World Championships
Gold medal – first place	2007 Stuttgart	Team
Pan American Games
Gold medal – first place	2007 Rio de Janeiro	Team
Representing UCLA Bruins
NCAA Championships
Gold medal – first place	2015 Fort Worth	All Around
Gold medal – first place	2015 Fort Worth	Balance Beam
Gold medal – first place	2011 Cleveland	Balance Beam
Silver medal – second place	2011 Cleveland	Team
Bronze medal – third place	2012 Duluth	Team

Samantha Nicole Peszek (born December 14, 1991) is an American former artistic gymnast. She was a member of the U.S. women's gymnastics team at the 2008 Summer Olympics, which won silver.

Following her elite gymnastics career, Peszek competed for the UCLA Bruins. She is a 17-time All-American, the 2011 and 2015 NCAA balance beam champion, and the 2015 NCAA all-around co-champion with Kytra Hunter.

== Elite career ==
Samantha was part of the gold medal-winning 2007 World Championships team.

After solid performances at the 2008 National Championships, Olympic Trials, and Olympic selection camp, Peszek was chosen as a member of the U.S. Olympic team, along with Shawn Johnson, Nastia Liukin, Chellsie Memmel, Alicia Sacramone, and Bridget Sloan.

At the 2008 Olympics in Beijing, Peszek injured her ankle during warm-ups just minutes before the women's qualification and was able to compete only on the uneven bars. She was the second gymnast on the U.S. team to be injured, the other being Memmel. The women went on to finish second in the team final, earning the silver medal.

After the Olympics, Peszek took time off to let her ankle heal before returning to elite competition at the 2009 CoverGirl U.S. Classic, where she placed second on vault. She then competed at the National Championships, hoping to make the World Championships team as a three-event specialist; she planned to postpone surgery to fix a torn labrum in her shoulder. She placed second on beam and seventh on floor exercise at Nationals and made it to the second and final selection camp for Worlds, but pulled out in order to have the surgical repair performed.

== NCAA career ==
Peszek redshirted the 2013 NCAA season after suffering a torn Achilles tendon. Later in 2013, she became an NACGC/W Scholastic All-American for the third consecutive year, and was inducted into the USA Gymnastics Hall of Fame as a member of the 2007 World Championships team.

In 2014, she returned to NCAA competition. In a tri-meet against Michigan and Utah, she competed in the all-around for the first time since 2012 and won with a total score of 39.65 (9.925 on vault, 9.875 on uneven bars, 9.925 on balance beam, and 9.925 on floor exercise). She then posted a career-high 39.70 all-around score during a tri-meet against Utah State and Bowling Green (9.950 on vault, 9.975 on uneven bars, 9.925 on balance beam, and 9.850 on floor exercise).

In March 2014, Peszek competed at the Pac-12 Conference Championship. She contributed scores of 9.825 on vault, 9.900 on uneven bars, 9.925 on balance beam, and 9.775 on floor exercise to the UCLA team's fourth-place finish. Individually, she was named the 2014 Pac-12 balance beam champion and finished second in the all-around competition.

In 2015, she opted to use her final year of NCAA eligibility as a fifth-year senior. She won the NCAA title on the balance beam with a score of 9.95, and the all-around title (tied with University of Florida gymnast Kytra Hunter) with a score of 39.60.

=== Career Perfect 10.0 ===
Season	Date	Event	Meet
2014	February 8, 2014	Uneven Bars	UCLA vs Arizona State

== Retirement ==
Peszek retired from competitive gymnastics following the 2015 NCAA National Championships. She ended her career as an Olympic medalist, a World Champion and a 3-time NCAA champion.

== Post-retirement ==
Peszek was hired by the Pac-12 Network as a color commentator for the 2016 gymnastics season. In 2017, Peszek started Beam Queen Bootcamp, a camp where she helps young gymnasts gain confidence and understand judging on the balance beam. In 2018 Peszek announced that she had started a podcast called I Have Cool Friends, on which she interviews prominent figures in the sport of gymnastics, including athletes and coaches.

== Personal life ==
Both of Samantha's parents were athletes at the University of Illinois. Her father Ed was a wrestler and a hockey player; her mother Luan was a gymnast and, more recently, vice-president of the women's program at USA Gymnastics. Samantha's mom put her in gymnastics at the age 3. Samantha's younger sister Jessica is also a gymnast, at Western Michigan University.

Peszek is Catholic and graduated from Cathedral High School in 2010.

After the 2008 Olympics, Peter Zhao, Peszek's longtime coach at DeVeau's School of Gymnastics, retired from coaching and returned to China to help with his family's business. Peszek transferred to Sharp's Gymnastics Academy, where she trained alongside Olympic teammate Bridget Sloan.

Peszek graduated from UCLA and lives in Los Angeles.

In light of the USA Gymnastics sex abuse scandal, Peszek has revealed that people have been wishing death and rape onto her and her family throughout Larry Nassar's trial due to the fact that her mother is vice president of program development for USA Gymnastics.

== Routines ==
=== Elite (2008) ===
- Vault – Double-twisting laid-out Yurchenko
- Uneven bars – Straight mount to high bar; kip; swing 1.5; Jaeger; clear hip 1/2 to Gienger; clear hip; bail to handstand on low bar; stalder transition to high bar; giant full; full-twisting double layout dismount
- Balance Beam – Back tuck 1/1 to back pike; front aerial to back handspring to layout step-out; switch side leap; front tuck; aerial cartwheel; full turn with leg at horizontal; wolf hop to switch leap to gainer layout step-out; round-off double pike dismount
- Floor Exercise – 1.5 twist to double back tuck; double layout; ring leap to switch 1/2; Arabian double front; triple turn; switch 1/1; double pike

=== NCAA (2014) ===
- Vault – Full-twisting laid-out Yurchenko
- Uneven bars – Glide kip; squat on low bar to hang on high bar; kip, cast to handstand; giant 1/1, Gienger; kip, cast to handstand; bail to handstand on low bar; toe-on to high bar; double layout dismount
- Floor Exercise – Double layout; front layout 1/1, front layout; split leap; split leap 1/2; double pike; double spin, wolf jump 1/1
- Balance Beam – Back tuck 1/1; front aerial, back tuck; switch leap, straddle jump; full turn; back handspring, layout step-out, layout 1/1 dismount

== Floor music ==
- 2009: "Reflejo de Luna" by Alacran and "It's You" by N.O.H.A.
- 2008: "Whatever Lola Wants" by The Gotan Project
- 2007: "My Number One" by Helena Paparizou
- 2005: "Mr. Pinstripe Suit" by Big Bad Voodoo Daddy

== Competitive history ==
Competitive history of Samantha Peszek at the junior elite level
Year	Event	Team	AA	VT	UB	BB	FX
2004	USA-Canada Friendly	1st place, gold medalist(s)					
2004	U.S. Classic		11	7			10
2004	U.S. Championships		8	3rd place, bronze medalist(s)	10		9
2005	Mexican Invitational	1st place, gold medalist(s)	1st place, gold medalist(s)	1st place, gold medalist(s)			1st place, gold medalist(s)
2005	U.S. Classic		8	2nd place, silver medalist(s)		9	3rd place, bronze medalist(s)
2005	U.S. Championships		7	1st place, gold medalist(s)			2nd place, silver medalist(s)
2006	International Gymnix		1st place, gold medalist(s)	1st place, gold medalist(s)	3rd place, bronze medalist(s)		
2006	Pan American Championships	1st place, gold medalist(s)	4	2nd place, silver medalist(s)			1st place, gold medalist(s)
2006	U.S. Classic		2nd place, silver medalist(s)	1st place, gold medalist(s)	4	2nd place, silver medalist(s)	1st place, gold medalist(s)
2006	U.S. Championships		3rd place, bronze medalist(s)	2nd place, silver medalist(s)	3rd place, bronze medalist(s)	7	5

Competitive history of Samantha Peszek at the senior elite level
Year	Event	Team	AA	VT	UB	BB	FX
2007	USA-Great Britain Friendly	1st place, gold medalist(s)	3rd place, bronze medalist(s)	1st place, gold medalist(s)		2nd place, silver medalist(s)	1st place, gold medalist(s)
2007	Pan American Games	1st place, gold medalist(s)					
2007	U.S. Championships		7		10	9	10
2007	World Championships	1st place, gold medalist(s)					
2008	American Cup		3rd place, bronze medalist(s)				
2008	Italy-Spain-Poland-USA Friendly	1st place, gold medalist(s)	3rd place, bronze medalist(s)				
2008	U.S. Championships		4		6	5	10
2008	U.S. Olympic Trials		4	4	6	4	2nd place, silver medalist(s)
2008	Olympic Games	2nd place, silver medalist(s)					
2009	U.S. Classic			2nd place, silver medalist(s)			
2009	U.S. Championships					2nd place, silver medalist(s)	7

Competitive history of Samantha Peszek at the NCAA level
Year	Event	Team	AA	VT	UB	BB	FX
2011	NCAA Championships	2nd place, silver medalist(s)				1st place, gold medalist(s)	
2012	NCAA Championships	3rd place, bronze medalist(s)				7	
2014	NCAA Championships		4				
2015	NCAA Championships		1st place, gold medalist(s)			1st place, gold medalist(s)	
