= Kayla Hoffman =

American artistic gymnast (born 1988)

- Born: August 13, 1988 (age 38)

Gymnastics career
- Discipline: Women's artistic gymnastics
- Country represented: United States
- Club: Rebound Gymnastics
- Head coach: Diane Farrell

Kayla Marie Hoffman (born August 13, 1988) is a former American artistic gymnast from Union, New Jersey. A former senior international elite, she competed for the University of Alabama gymnastics team from 2008 to 2011. In 2011, she won the Honda Sports Award as the top woman gymnast.

== Career ==
Hoffman took up gymnastics in 1991, after her mother put her in classes. Because of a love of the sport, she encouraged her mother to take her out of classes and put her on a team. For the vault event, she does a nine step run up.

Hoffman has represented the United States internationally. She competed at the 2006 World Cup in Russia. She also competed at the 2006 Friendship Classic.

== Collegiate career ==
Hoffman competed on the collegiate level at the University of Alabama. While competing for the school, she trained 20 hours a week in the gym and managed a 4.0 grade point average.

In the 2008 season, she competed in a meet against Auburn University. At the 2008 Women's NCAA Championships, she finished fifth in the vault with a score of 9.762.

At the 2010 SEC Championships, Hoffman posted a score of 9.9 on the floor to tie with two other gymnasts for second place.

A senior in 2011, she helped guide her team to a fifth national championship win with a performance that included a 9.95 on the floor exercise. She also finished second in the balance beam with a score of 9.8875. She had a third-place finish in the uneven bars, tying with three other gymnasts. The Crimson Tide gymnast went into the competition as a favorite to do well. She went into the competition ranked fourth nationally in the all around, and second in the vault. Her team was ranked second in the nation, after having been ranked ninth earlier in the season.

Hoffman was also a key gymnast for the team in their 2011 SEC and NCAA Tuscaloosa Regional Championships wins after being a leader on the team for most of the season. At the 2011 SEC Championships, she won the vault competition with a score of 9.950. A score of 9.875 on the bars put her in fourth place. She tied for third in the all around competition at the SEC Championships with a score of 39.350. Hoffman won the 2010-11 Roy F. Kramer SEC Female Athlete of the Year as a result of her performance, the first Alabama woman to win the award since 2004.

Competing in the season opener of the 2010–2011 season, Hoffman had a score of 9.9 on the floor competition, which was enough to give her a first-place finish. At another meet that season against Georgia, she scored 9.95 on the floor and put up an all around score of 39.675 to win both events. Another meet against the Arkansas Razorbacks saw her put up a score of 9.35 on the uneven bars and a 9.95 on the vault. The vault score included two scores of 10 from judges. She finished second at the meet on the beam with a score of 9.825. On senior night of her senior season, she scored a 9.95 in the vault, which was a season high for her in the event. She also put up a score of 9.925 on her floor routine. She had some issues on senior night, including a fall during her beam routine.

Hoffman finished her collegiate career in 2011 as a 5 time All American. Other honors included earning the SEC Gymnast of the Year and SEC Gymnastics Scholar-Athlete of the Year in the same year. She also earned SEC Gymnast of the Week honors twice.

== Background ==
Born on August 13, 1988, Hoffman is originally from Union, New Jersey. She is 5'1" and weighed 120 pounds.

In 2010, Hoffman started the process of applying for graduate school. Going into her senior year at the University of Alabama, she had a 4.0 grade point average. She completed an internship at the Johns Hopkins Children's Center in Baltimore.

During her time at the University of Alabama, she dated Michael Hughes, a member of the university's track team. In her senior year, she lived off campus in Tuscaloosa. Following her win at the 2011 National Championships, she was outside her apartment when a tornado struck the building, suffering a six inch long cut along her calf as a result of flying glass. Hughes found her after the tornado.

== Awards ==
- 2010-11 Roy F. Kramer SEC Female Athlete of the Year
- NCAA Postgraduate Scholarship
- SEC Postgraduate Scholarship
- SEC Gymnast of the Year
- 2011 SEC Gymnastics Scholar-Athlete of the Year
- 2011 Honda Award
