= Luisa Blanco =

Colombian-American artistic gymnast (born 2001)

- Full name: Luisa Fernanda Blanco Saavedra
- Born: 18 November 2001 (age 24) Los Angeles, California, U.S.
- Height: 1.57 m (5 ft 2 in)

Gymnastics career
- Discipline: Women's artistic gymnastics
- Country represented: Colombia (2023–2024)
- Former countries represented: United States
- College team: Alabama Crimson Tide (2020–2024)
- Club: Midwest Gymnastics Center
- Head coach: Jess Graba
- Former coach: Yevgeny Marchenko
Medal record
Women's artistic gymnastics
Representing Alabama Crimson Tide
NCAA Championships
Gold medal – first place	2021 Fort Worth	Balance beam
Silver medal – second place	2021 Fort Worth	All-around
Silver medal – second place	2023 Fort Worth	Uneven bars
Bronze medal – third place	2021 Fort Worth	Uneven bars

Luisa Fernanda Blanco Saavedra (born 18 November 2001) is an artistic gymnast. Born in the United States, she represents Colombia internationally. She competed for the Alabama Crimson Tide gymnastic team and is the 2021 NCAA Champion on the balance beam. She represented Colombia at the 2024 Summer Olympics.

== Early life ==
Blanco was born on November 18, 2001, in Los Angeles, California. Her parents, Sandra Saavedra and Nelson Blanco, are immigrants from Colombia.

== Gymnastics career ==
=== 2017–2019: Elite ===
Blanco made her elite debut at the 2017 WOGA Classic. She did not compete in the all-around, but she posted the highest score of the competition on the balance beam, and she won silver with the WOGA team. Then at the 2017 U.S. Classic, she tied with Kalyany Steele for the all-around bronze medal behind Alyona Shchennikova and Abby Paulson. She then finished 12th all-around at the 2017 U.S. Championships.

Blanco finished ninth all-around at the 2018 WOGA Classic and had the third-highest score on the balance beam. Then at the International Gymnix in Montreal, she finished ninth in the all-around and on uneven bars and eighth on balance beam. She also finished ninth all-around at the 2018 U.S. Classic. She then finished 17th all-around at the 2018 U.S. Championships. At the 2019 WOGA Classic, she competed on the uneven bars where she had the highest score of the meet and on the balance beam where she finished second behind Sloane Blakely.

=== 2020–2023: NCAA ===
Blanco graduated from Lebanon Trail High School one semester early and joined the Alabama Crimson Tide gymnastics team in January 2020. Her freshman season was cut short due the COVID-19 pandemic. At the 2021 SEC Championships, she helped her team win the title, and individually, she won the all-around, vault, uneven bars and balance beam titles. She was named the 2021 SEC Gymnast of the Year. She scored her first perfect 10 at the 2021 Regional semifinal on the balance beam. At the 2021 NCAA Championships, she won the balance beam title with a score of 9.9625, and she finished second in the all-around behind Oklahoma's Anastasia Webb.

At the 2022 SEC Championships, Blanco helped Alabama finish second behind Florida, and she placed second on the uneven bars behind Sunisa Lee. However, she injured her ankle on the balance beam. The injury was minor, and she competed on three events at the 2022 NCAA Championships where Alabama was eliminated in the semifinals. During the 2023 regular season, she scored three perfect 10s on the balance beam. Then at the 2023 SEC Championships, she finished second in the all-around to help Alabama finish second behind Florida. Alabama failed to advance to the 2023 NCAA Championships, but Blanco qualified as an individual on the uneven bars and finished in second place.

=== 2023: Elite return ===
In 2023, Blanco announced that she was returning to elite gymnastics and switching nationalities to represent Colombia. She began training at Midwest Gymnastics Center with Sunisa Lee's coach, Jess Graba. She won the all-around and uneven bars titles at the 2023 Colombian Championships. She was selected to represent Colombia at the 2023 Pan American Games where she helped the Colombian team place fifth. Individually, Blanco qualified for the all-around final where she finished eighth with a total score of 50.099. As the highest-placing athlete who was eligible for an Olympic berth, Blanco qualified for the 2024 Olympic Games.

=== 2024: NCAA and Olympics ===
Blanco announced on April 28, 2023, that she would be returning to the Alabama gymnastics team for her fifth and final year. In Blanco's final home meet, which also celebrated senior night, she scored two perfect 10s, her first on vault and floor exercise. She led her team to a second-place finish at the SEC Championships with scores above 9.900 on all four apparatuses. Then at the NCAA Championships, she was one of four Alabama gymnasts who fell off the balance beam, leading to an eighth place finish. She finished her NCAA career with 21 All-America honors, the most of any Alabama gymnast in program history.

Blanco represented Colombia at the 2024 Summer Olympics. In the qualification round, she finished 30th in the all-around, but after applying the two-per-country rule, she took the 24th and final spot in the all-around final. She is the first Colombian artistic gymnast to reach an Olympic final.

== Competitive history ==
Competitive history of Luisa Blanco at the senior elite level representing United States
Year	Event	Team	AA	VT	UB	BB	FX
2017	WOGA Classic					1st place, gold medalist(s)	3rd place, bronze medalist(s)
2017	U.S. Classic		3rd place, bronze medalist(s)		13	2nd place, silver medalist(s)	12
2017	U.S. National Championships		12		17	7	11
2018	WOGA Classic		9			3rd place, bronze medalist(s)	
2018	International Gymnix		9		9	8	
2018	U.S. Classic		9		12	6	11
2018	U.S. Championships		17		19	17	14
2019	WOGA Classic				1st place, gold medalist(s)	2nd place, silver medalist(s)	

Competitive history of Luisa Blanco at the NCAA level
Year	Event	Team	AA	VT	UB	BB	FX
2020	SEC Championships	Canceled due to the COVID-19 pandemic in the USA					
2020	NCAA Championships	Canceled due to the COVID-19 pandemic in the USA					
2021	SEC Championships	1st place, gold medalist(s)	1st place, gold medalist(s)	1st place, gold medalist(s)	1st place, gold medalist(s)	1st place, gold medalist(s)	2nd place, silver medalist(s)
2021	NCAA Championships	5	2nd place, silver medalist(s)		3rd place, bronze medalist(s)	1st place, gold medalist(s)	
2022	SEC Championships	2nd place, silver medalist(s)	12		2nd place, silver medalist(s)		
2022	NCAA Championships	7					
2023	SEC Championships	2nd place, silver medalist(s)	2nd place, silver medalist(s)				
2023	NCAA Championships				2nd place, silver medalist(s)		
2024	SEC Championships	2nd place, silver medalist(s)	2nd place, silver medalist(s)				
2024	NCAA Championships	8	23	17	5	52	18

Competitive history of Luisa Blanco at the senior elite level representing Colombia
Year	Event	Team	AA	VT	UB	BB	FX
2023	Colombian Championships		1st place, gold medalist(s)		1st place, gold medalist(s)		
2023	Pan American Games	5	8			7	
2024
2024	Olympic Games		23				

== Career perfect 10.0 ==
Season	Date	Event	Meet
2021	April 2, 2021	Balance beam	Regional semifinal
2023	February 4, 2023	Balance beam	Alabama vs Auburn
2023	February 24, 2023	Balance beam	Alabama vs LSU
2023	March 3, 2023	Balance beam	Alabama @ Missouri
2024	March 8, 2024	Vault & Floor exercise	Alabama quad
