= Natalie Wojcik =

American artistic gymnast

- Born: October 14, 1999 (age 26) Abington, Pennsylvania, United States

Gymnastics career
- Discipline: Women's artistic gymnastics
- College team: Michigan Wolverines (2019-23)
- Club: Stallone Gymnastics (2016–2018); Berks Gymnastics (2014–2016)
- Head coaches: Bev Plocki; Marty Amrich
- Assistant coach: Gina Stallone Amrich
- Awards: AAI Award (2022)
Medal record
Representing Michigan Wolverines
NCAA Championships
Gold medal – first place	2019 Fort Worth	Balance Beam
Gold medal – first place	2021 Fort Worth	Team

Natalie Ann Wojcik (born October 14, 1999) is a former American artistic gymnast. She competed for the Michigan Wolverines women's gymnastics team, and is a seven-time All-American and 2022 AAI Award recipient.

== Early and personal life ==
Wojcik was born in Abington, Pennsylvania to Bernie and Suzy Wojcik. She grew up in Douglassville, Pennsylvania with three siblings, Nicole, Nadia and Noelle, who are all competitive gymnasts. Wojcik began gymnastics at the age of three. She is of Polish descent.

== Career ==
In the fall of 2018, Wojcik began attending the University of Michigan, joining the Michigan Wolverines women's gymnastics team. In her collegiate debut, she broke the school record of the highest all-around score (39.625) in a college debut with a 39.625; Wojcik also won three event titles (vault, bars and beam) at the same meet. She was named the WCGA Northeast Regional Gymnast of the Year and the Big Ten Freshman of the Year; she was named a two-time All-American for her freshman season: first team on balance beam, second team in the all-around.

In the post-season, Wojcik helped to lead her team to first place at the Big Ten Championships, becoming the Big Ten Floor and All-Around Champion, as well as second-place on vault and beam. Moreover, Wojcik was named to the All-Big Ten first team. At the NCAA National Championships, she became the Regional Floor Champion at the Ann Arbor regional, placed 5th with her team (despite posting the 4th highest score of the two semi-finals), and became the National Beam Champion with a score of 9.950.

As a junior, Wojcik won 15 event titles and scored at least a 9.900 on 28 events. At the Big Ten Championships, she won the individual vault title and took second place in the individual uneven bars and team competition. She scored two perfect 10s during the 2021 season. At the NCAA Championships, Wojcik helped Michigan win their first ever team championships, defeating the University of Oklahoma, University of Utah, and University of Florida.

Following her senior year in 2022, she was awarded the AAI Award. In June 2022, she was awarded the Excellence in Sports Award by the National Polish-American Sports Hall of Fame for her 2021 achievements.

Wojcik returned for a fifth season in 2023. She earned the fifth perfect 10 of her career against the University of Minnesota. At the Big Ten Championships, she captured the uneven bars title and the team title. She qualified as an individual to the NCAA Championships on uneven bars. During her career at Michigan, she earned 99 career event and all-around victories, as well as notching 135 career scores of 9.900 or higher.

=== Regular season ranking ===
Season	All-Around	Vault	Uneven Bars	Balance Beam	Floor Exercise
2019	6th	3rd	23rd	7th	32nd
2020	14th	34th	19th	17th	37th
2021	6th	12th	6th	4th	54th
2022	11th	10th	8th	8th	19th
2023	17th	56th	12th	15th	127th

=== Career perfect 10.0s ===
Season	Date	Event	Meet
2019	February 23, 2019	Vault	Elevate the Stage
2021	February 15, 2021	Balance Beam	Michigan vs Nebraska
2021	March 20, 2021	Vault	Big Ten Championships
2022	February 4, 2022	Vault	Michigan @ Rutgers
2023	February 10, 2023	Balance Beam	Michigan vs Minnesota

=== NCAA Regular season ranking ===
Season	All-Around	Vault	Uneven Bars	Balance Beam	Floor Exercise
2019	6th	3rd	23rd	7th	32nd
2020 (Note: The season was cancelled after the 10th week of competition due to the coronavirus pandemic.)	14th	34th	19th	17th	37th
2021	6th	12th	6th	4th	54th
2022	11th	10th	8th	8th	19th
2023	17th	56th	12th	15th	127th

== Competitive history ==
Year	Event	Team	AA	VT	UB	BB	FX
Level 10
2016	Nastia Liukin Cup		4				
2017	Nastia Liukin Cup		4				
2018	Nastia Liukin Cup		4				
NCAA
2019	Big 10 Championships	1st place, gold medalist(s)	1st place, gold medalist(s)	2nd place, silver medalist(s)	12	2nd place, silver medalist(s)	1st place, gold medalist(s)
2019	NCAA Championships	SF	8			1st place, gold medalist(s)	15
2020	Postseason cancelled due to the COVID-19 pandemic						
2021	Big 10 Championships	2nd place, silver medalist(s)	13	1st place, gold medalist(s)	2nd place, silver medalist(s)	11	53
2021	NCAA Championships	1st place, gold medalist(s)	24	11		17	13
2022	Big 10 Championships	1st place, gold medalist(s)	13	2nd place, silver medalist(s)	58	1st place, gold medalist(s)	59
2022	NCAA Championships	8	8				
2023	Big 10 Championships	1st place, gold medalist(s)	4	4	1st place, gold medalist(s)	23	32
