= Oklahoma Sooners women's gymnastics =

University of Oklahoma gymnastics team

- Founded: 1981 (45 years ago)
- University: University of Oklahoma
- Athletic director: Roger Denny
- Head coach: K.J. Kindler (20th season)
- Conference: SEC
- Location: Norman, Oklahoma
- Home arena: Lloyd Noble Center (Capacity: 11,562)
- Nickname: Sooners
- Colors: Crimson and cream

National championships
- 2014, (Note: Co-champions with Florida) 2016, 2017, 2019, 2022, 2023, 2025, 2026

Four on the Floor appearances
- 2019, 2021, 2022, 2023, 2025, 2026

Super Six appearances
- 2010, 2011, 2013, 2014, 2015, 2016, 2017, 2018

NCAA Regional championships
- 2004, 2006, 2010, 2011, 2012, 2013, 2014, 2015, 2016, 2017, 2018, 2019, 2021, 2022, 2023, 2024, 2025, 2026

NCAA Tournament appearances
- 1985, 1989, 2001, 2004, 2005, 2006, 2007, 2008, 2009, 2010, 2011, 2012, 2013, 2014, 2015, 2016, 2017, 2018, 2022, 2023, 2024, 2025, 2026

Conference championships
- 1984, 1985, 1986, 1991, 1993, 2004, 2008, 2009, 2010, 2012, 2013, 2014, 2015, 2016, 2017, 2018, 2019, 2022, 2023, 2024

The Oklahoma Sooners women's gymnastics represents the University of Oklahoma in NCAA competition and competes in the Southeastern Conference (SEC). The Sooners have won 20 conference championships, 15 NCAA Regional championships, and have appeared in 21 NCAA National Championships. In 2014, the Sooners won the program's first-ever team national title in the first-ever NCAA gymnastics championships in a tie, as they tied with Florida with a score of 198.175. The Sooners have had eighteen individual national champions, 202 NCAA All-Americans, and five Honda Awards (two to Kelly Garrison, Maggie Nichols, Anastasia Webb, and Jordan Bowers).

Some notable former and current OU gymnasts include Kelly Garrison, Chelle Stack, Hollie Vise, Natasha Kelley, McKenzie Wofford, Brenna Dowell, Maggie Nichols, Anastasia Webb, Ragan Smith, Jordan Bowers, and Faith Torrez.

== History ==
The Sooners gymnastics team was founded in 1981 under head coach Paul Ziert, who led the Sooners to three regional championships and two NCAA tournament appearances. The Sooners won their first five Big Eight Conference titles beginning in 1984 under coach Becky Switzer. Steve Nunno added another Big 12 Conference title in 2004.

Current head coach K. J. Kindler took over the program before the 2007 season; the Sooners qualified to their first Super Six team final in 2010, finishing 2nd. In 2014, Oklahoma became the sixth school to win an NCAA gymnastics team title (following Alabama, Utah, Georgia, UCLA and Florida). The 2014 Super Six final was the first to end in a tie, giving Oklahoma their first title and Florida their second straight.

At the 2024 Big 12 Championships, the Sooners gymnastics team earned a score of 198.950, which became the new highest score in college gymnastics history and broke the twenty-year-old record (198.875) set by UCLA and Stanford in 2004.

== Championships ==
=== Super Six appearances ===
Oklahoma Sooners Super Six Appearances
| Year | Finish | Score |
| 2010 | 2nd | 197.250 |
| 2011 | 3rd | 197.250 |
| 2013 | 2nd | 197.375 |
| 2014 | 1st | 198.175 |
| 2015 | 3rd | 197.525 |
| 2016 | 1st | 197.6750 |
| 2017 | 1st | 198.3875 |
| 2018 | 2nd | 198.0375 |

=== Four on the Floor appearances ===
Oklahoma Sooners Four on the Floor Appearances
| Year | Finish | Score |
| 2019 | 1st | 198.3375 |
| 2021 | 2nd | 198.1625 |
| 2022 | 1st | 198.2000 |
| 2023 | 1st | 198.3875 |
| 2025 | 1st | 198.0125 |
| 2026 | 1st | 198.1625 |

=== Conference championships ===
| Season | Conference | Head coach |
|---|---|---|
| 1984 | Big Eight | Becky Switzer |
| 1985 | Big Eight | Becky Switzer |
| 1986 | Big Eight | Becky Switzer |
| 1991 | Big Eight | Becky Switzer |
| 1993 | Big Eight | Becky Switzer |
| 2004 | Big 12 | Steve Nunno |
| 2008 | Big 12 | K.J. Kindler |
| 2009 | Big 12 | K.J. Kindler |
| 2010 | Big 12 | K.J. Kindler |
| 2012 | Big 12 | K.J. Kindler |
| 2013 | Big 12 | K.J. Kindler |
| 2014 | Big 12 | K.J. Kindler |
| 2015 | Big 12 | K.J. Kindler |
| 2016 | Big 12 | K.J. Kindler |
| 2017 | Big 12 | K.J. Kindler |
| 2018 | Big 12 | K.J. Kindler |
| 2019 | Big 12 | K.J. Kindler |
| 2022 | Big 12 | K.J. Kindler |
| 2023 | Big 12 | K.J. Kindler |
| 2024 | Big 12 | K.J. Kindler |

== Roster ==
2026–2027 Roster
| Name | Height | Year | Hometown |
|---|---|---|---|
| Elizabeth Blessey | 5-5 | JR | Mandeville, LA |
| Nicole Desmond | 4-11 | SO | Kingston, PA |
| Presley Duke | | FR | Yukon, OK |
| Mackenzie Estep | 5-2 | SO | Auburn, WA |
| Sofia Estrada | | FR | Gainesville, FL |
| Addison Fatta | 5-2 | JR | Wrightsville, PA |
| Madray Johnson | | FR | Dallas, TX |
| Aspen Lenczner | 5-2 | SR | Oak Creek, WI |
| Evey Lowe | | FR | Blue Springs, MO |
| Elle Mueller | 5-2 | JR | Ham Lake, MN |
| Ella Murphy | 5-3 | SO | Frisco, TX |
| Kamila Pawlak | 5-4 | SO | Melissa, TX |
| Lily Pederson | 4-10 | JR | White Bear Lake, MN |
| Blakely Roten | 5-4 | SO | San Antonio, TX |
| Hannah Scheible | 5-3 | SR | Kimball, MI |
| Maddie Simpson | | FR | West Chester, PA |
| Kelsey Slade | 5-1 | JR | Vail, AZ |
| Hurley Snow | 5-9 | JR | Newcastle, OK |
| Izzy Stassi | | FR | Columbus, OH |
| Kendall Torrens | | FR | Arlington, TX |
| Keira Wells | 5-2 | SR | Augusta, KS |

== Coaches ==
- Head coach: K. J. Kindler
- Associate head coach: Lou Ball
- Associate head coach: Tom Hale
- Assistant coach: Olivia Trautman

== Past Olympians ==
- Kelly Garrison (1988)
- Chelle Stack (1988)
- Ragan Smith (2016 alternate)

== See also ==
- Oklahoma Sooners men's gymnastics
