= Anastasia Webb =

American artistic gymnast

- Full name: Anastasia Maria Webb
- Born: June 15, 1999 (age 27) Salinas, California
- Height: 5 ft 5 in (165 cm)

Gymnastics career
- Discipline: Women's artistic gymnastics
- Country represented: United States
- College team: Oklahoma Sooners
- Gym: Illinois Gymnastics Institute
- Head coach: KJ Kindler
- Former coach: Todd Gardiner
- Retired: May 17, 2021
Medal record
Representing Oklahoma Sooners
NCAA Championships
Gold medal – first place	2019 Fort Worth	Team
Gold medal – first place	2021 Fort Worth	All Around
Gold medal – first place	2021 Fort Worth	Vault
Gold medal – first place	2021 Fort Worth	Floor Exercise
Silver medal – second place	2018 St Louis	Team
Silver medal – second place	2021 Fort Worth	Team
Bronze medal – third place	2021 Fort Worth	Balance Beam

Anastasia Maria Webb (born June 15, 1999) is an American former artistic gymnast. She competed for the Oklahoma Sooners women's gymnastics team. In 2021, she became the NCAA All Around Champion and tied for the floor and vault titles, to go along with OU's team championship from 2019.

== Personal life ==
Webb was born in Salinas, California, to Chris and Magda Webb. She has one brother, George. Webb grew up in Morton Grove, Illinois. She attended Niles West High School and graduated in 2017. She is fluent in Greek.

== Gymnastics ==
=== Early career ===
Webb started gymnastics in 2004. She trained at the Illinois Gymnastics Institute in Westmont, Illinois. At the 2017 Nastia Liukin Cup, she finished ninth in the all-around.

=== NCAA career ===
Webb competed for the Oklahoma Sooners women's gymnastics team. As a freshman in 2018, she won six event titles: two on vault, two on uneven bars, one on balance beam, and one on floor. At UCLA on February 4, she scored a perfect 10 on balance beam. She was the Big 12 co-champion on floor. At the NCAA Championship, she won a silver medal with the Oklahoma team and tied for fifth on floor.

As a sophomore in 2019, Webb won 11 event titles: three in the all-around, one on vault, one on uneven bars, five on balance beam, and one on floor. She won a gold medal with the Oklahoma team at the NCAA Championship.

As a junior in 2020, Webb won 16 event titles: five in the all-around, two on vault, four on balance beam, and five on floor.

Webb was a senior in 2021. At the NCAA Championship, she won gold medals in the all-around and on vault and floor, and she won a silver medal with the Oklahoma team.

Webb was awarded the 2021 Honda Sports Award for gymnastics.

==== Career perfect 10.0 ====
Season	Date	Event	Meet
2018	February 4, 2018	Balance Beam	Oklahoma @ UCLA
2021	February 13, 2021	Vault	Oklahoma @ Metroplex
2021	March 5, 2021	Balance Beam	Oklahoma vs BYU
2021	March 7, 2021	Vault	Oklahoma @ TWU
2021	April 2, 2021	Uneven Bars	NCAA Regionals

== Competitive history ==
Year	Event	Team	AA	VT	UB	BB	FX
2018	Big-12 Championships	1st place, gold medalist(s)	3rd place, bronze medalist(s)	10	6	18	1st place, gold medalist(s)
2018	NCAA Championships	2nd place, silver medalist(s)		30		44	5
2019	Big-12 Championships	1st place, gold medalist(s)	2nd place, silver medalist(s)	3rd place, bronze medalist(s)	5	6	5
2019	NCAA Championships	1st place, gold medalist(s)	19	20	9	52	16
2020	Big-12 Championships	Canceled due to the COVID-19 pandemic in the USA					
2020	NCAA Championships	Canceled due to the COVID-19 pandemic in the USA					
2021	Big-12 Championships	2nd place, silver medalist(s)	3rd place, bronze medalist(s)	1st place, gold medalist(s)	3rd place, bronze medalist(s)	1st place, gold medalist(s)	17
2021	NCAA Championships	2nd place, silver medalist(s)	1st place, gold medalist(s)	1st place, gold medalist(s)	7	3rd place, bronze medalist(s)	1st place, gold medalist(s)

Awards
Preceded by Kyla Ross	Honda Sports Award (gymnastics); 2021	Succeeded by Incumbent
