= Bev Plocki =

American gymnastics coach

Biographical details
- Born: September 6, 1964 (age 62); Butler, Pennsylvania
- Education: West Virginia

Playing career
- 1983: Alabama
- 1985–1987: West Virginia

Coaching career (HC unless noted)
- 1988–1989: West Virginia
- 1990–2025: Michigan

Head coaching record
- Overall: 847–267–4 (.759)

Accomplishments and honors

Championships
- 26× Big Ten Champions (1992–1997, 1999–2005, 2007–2011, 2014–2019, 2022, 2023); 13× NCAA Regional Championships (1997, 1999–2001, 2003, 2005, 2006, 2011, 2013, 2014, 2017, 2021–2023); 2021 NCAA National Championship

Awards
- 13× NCAA Regional Coach of the Year (1992, 1994, 1997, 2010, 2013, 2016–2023); 11× Big Ten Coach of the Year (1992–1995, 1999, 2000, 2003, 2004, 2008, 2010, 2015); 2× NCAA Coach of the Year (1994, 2021); West Virginia Sports Hall of Fame (2018)

Beverly Jean Plocki (born Beverly Jean Fry; September 6, 1964) is an American former gymnastics coach who most recently served as the coach of the Michigan Wolverines women's gymnastics team. In 36 years as the head coach at Michigan, her teams have a record of 847–267–4 and have won 26 Big Ten Conference championships, and advanced to 26 NCAA Women's Gymnastics Championships, including 16 straight NCAA championship tournaments from 1993 to 2008. Plocki led her team to the NCAA Championship in 2021, the first championship won by a Big Ten Conference team.

== Biography ==
Plocki was an All-American gymnast on the balance beam at the University of Alabama. She began her coaching career as a graduate assistant at West Virginia University while studying for a master's degree. Plocki applied for an open coaching spot at the University of Michigan at age 23 and got the job. When she took over at the University of Michigan, the women's gymnastics team was at a low point, having gone 0-13 and finished in last place in the conference in 1989 and having compiled a 1-10 record in 1988. The Michigan gymnasts improved to 7-15 in Plocki's first season. Plocki's conversion of the Michigan gymnastics program received a major boost when she succeeded in recruiting Toledo, Ohio, native Beth Wymer to Michigan. In recruiting Wymer, Plocki told her: "You can go to one of the three dominant schools (Utah, Georgia or Alabama) and be another All-America on their list of All-Americas. Or, you can come to Michigan and be the first All-America." Since then, Plocki has had All-Americans every year. Plocki gives Wymer credit for helping to build the Michigan gymnastics program: "I don't know where we would be today if she hadn't made the decision to come to Michigan. Her being here allowed us to recruit a completely different level of athlete. It is monumental what she did for this program." In 2001, Plocki landed another blue-chip recruit when Elise Ray, captain of the 2000 U.S. Olympic gymnastics team committed to Michigan.

In 1992, Plocki led the Wolverines to a Big Ten championship. Michigan went on to win six straight Big Ten championships starting in 1992 and also became one of the top teams in the NCAA championships. In 1993, Plocki's squad made its first appearance in the NCAA championships and finished ninth. In 1994, Michigan finished fourth in the NCAA championship and improved to No. 2 in 1995. In 1997, Michigan's gymnasts won a sixth straight Big Ten championship, won all five events, and finished 1-2-3 in the all-around. After missing the Big Ten championship in 1998, Plocki's teams started a new streak of seven straight conference titles from 1999 to 2005, a Big Ten record for most consecutive titles. The 1999 team also finished No. 2 at the NCAA championship.

In all, Michigan has won 26 Big Ten Championships under Plocki, including 15 of 17 Big Ten championships between 1992 and 2008. Plocki's teams also advanced to the NCAA championships 16 straight seasons between 1993 and 2008. Plocki is an 11-time Big Ten Coach of the Year, 13-time NCAA Regional Coach of the Year and was the 1994 and 2021 NCAA National Coach of the Year.

In 2018, Plocki won her 23rd Big Ten championship. With the win, she tied former Indiana men's swimming head coach James Counsilman for the most championships by any head coach in any sport in Big Ten history.

In 2021, Plocki led Michigan to their first NCAA Women's Gymnastics Championships in program history. On July 16, 2025, she retired after 36-years as head coach at Michigan. She has led the Wolverines to 26 Big Ten championships, the most by any coach, in any sport, in Big Ten history.

== Coaching record ==
Season	Overall record	Big Ten record	Big Ten rank	NCAA tournament
1990	7–15	2–10	6th	—
1991	13–12	9–5	3rd	—
1992	25–4	11–0	1st	—
1993	29–10	9–1	1st	9th
1994	36–8	13–0	1st	4th
1995	36–5–1	12–0	1st	T-2nd
1996	29–14	10–3	1st	6th
1997	32–9	9–0	1st	4th
1998	22–10	8–2	2nd	8th
1999	32–6	10–1	1st	2nd
2000	30–12	9–0	1st	6th
2001	27–10	9–0	1st	3rd
2002	31–7	11–0	1st	7th
2003	26–12	9–1	1st	5th
2004	19–11	8–1	1st	8th
2005	32–7	13–0	1st	5th
2006	22–8–1	7–3	4th	7th
2007	21–11	8–2	1st	T-11th
2008	29–6	11–0	1st	T-8th
2009	22–7	10–0	1st	—
2010	25–7	10–1	1st	10th
2011	26–11	10–1	1st	6th
2012	16–10	9–5	4th	—
2013	31–5	17–2	2nd	7th
2014	28–8	14–2	1st	10th
2015	27–6	19–0	1st	7th
2016	23–8	6–3	T-3rd	—
2017	27–7	8–1	1st	10th
2018	26–5–1	8–1	1st	—
2019	29–8–1	9–0	1st	5th
2020	12–1	9–0	1st	— (Note: Tournament cancelled due to the COVID-19 pandemic.)
2021	29–2	7–1	2nd	1st
2022	28–5	9–0	1st	8th
2023	27-3-1	8-1	1st	9th
2024	18-10	8-1	3rd	—
2025	19-11	6-3	4th	—
Total	847–267–4	323–46		
