= Michigan Wolverines women's gymnastics =

Women's gymnastics team of the University of Michigan

Michigan Wolverines Women's Gymnastics
- Founded: 1976
- University: University of Michigan
- Head coach: Maile'ana Kanewa-Hermelyn (1st season)
- Conference: Big Ten
- Location: Ann Arbor, Michigan
- Home arena: Crisler Center (Capacity: 12,707)
- Nickname: Wolverines
- Colors: Maize and blue

National championships
- 2021

Four on the Floor appearances
- 2021

Super Six appearances
- 1994, 1995, 1996, 1997, 1999, 2000, 2001, 2003, 2005, 2011

NCAA Regional championships
- 1982, 1997, 1999, 2000, 2001, 2003, 2005, 2006, 2011, 2013, 2014, 2017, 2021, 2022

NCAA Tournament appearances
- 1982, 1993, 1994, 1995, 1996, 1997, 1998, 1999, 2000, 2001, 2002, 2003, 2004, 2005, 2006, 2007, 2008, 2009, 2010, 2011, 2012, 2013, 2014, 2015, 2016, 2017, 2018, 2019, 2021, 2022, 2023, 2024, 2025

Conference championships
- 1982, 1992, 1993, 1994, 1995, 1996, 1997, 1999, 2000, 2001, 2002, 2003, 2004, 2005, 2007, 2008, 2009, 2010, 2011, 2014, 2015, 2016, 2017, 2018, 2019, 2022, 2023

The Michigan Wolverines women's gymnastics team represents the University of Michigan and competes in the Big Ten Conference. Under head coach Bev Plocki, the team has won 27 Big Ten championships and advanced to 31 NCAA Women's Gymnastics Championships, including sixteen consecutive appearances from 1993 to 2008. In 2021, the Wolverines won the program's first-ever team national title. Maile'ana Kanewa-Hermelyn became head coach after Plocki retired in 2025.

== History ==
The Michigan Wolverines women's gymnastics team was formed in 1976. In its 42-year history, the team has had six coaches.

Newt Loken, head of the men's gymnastics team from 1948 to 1983, was hired to be the first women's coach and served one season. Anne Cornell and Scott Ponto both served short tenures before Sheri Hyatt for five seasons starting in 1980. Under Hyatt, the program won its first Big Ten conference championship and qualified to its first NCAA tournament, both in 1982.

Hyatt was followed in 1985 by Dana Kempthorn, and then in 1990 by current head coach Bev Plocki. Plocki has led the Wolverines to twenty-six Big Ten titles, 30 NCAA tournament appearances, 26 NCAA Women's Gymnastics Championships, including sixteen consecutive championship berths from 1993 to 2008.

The Wolverines have had five gymnasts who have won NCAA individual championships. Beth Wymer won the NCAA championship in the uneven bars three consecutive years from 1993 to 1995. Elise Ray won the NCAA all-around championship in 2001 (tied with UCLA's Onnie Willis), the balance beam championship in 2002 and the uneven bars in 2004. In 2011, Kylee Botterman won the NCAA all-around championship. In 2013, Joanna Sampson won the NCAA championship on floor exercise. In 2019, Natalie Wojcik won the NCAA championship on balance beam.

The Wolverines have qualified for the NCAA Championships 31 times. They have qualified to the Super Six team finals ten times: Since the format of the NCAA Championships changed starting in 2019, the Wolverines have qualified to the Four on the Floor team finals one time. In 2021, the team won their first NCAA Championship with a program-best score of 198.2500.

== Coaches ==
=== Head coaches ===
	Name	Seasons	W – L – T
1	Newt Loken	1976	1–1
2	Anne Cornell	1977–1978	6–6
3	Scott Ponto	1979	19–3
4	Sheri Hyatt	1980–1984	51–26–1
5	Dana Kempthorn	1985–1989	42–76
6	Bev Plocki	1990–2025	847–267–4
7	Maile'ana Kanewa-Hermelyn	2026–present	

=== Coaches for the 2025–26 season ===
Name	Position	Seasons
Maile'ana Kanewa-Hermelyn	Head coach	2026–present
Scott Sherman	Associate head coach	2019–present
Cali Hager	Assistant coach	2023–present
Lucie Kirchner	Student assistant coach	2026–present

== Championships ==
=== Super Six Appearances ===
Michigan Wolverines Super Six Appearances
Year	Finish	Score
1994	4th	195.150
1995	2nd	196.425
1996	6th	196.375
1997	4th	196.500
1999	2nd	196.550
2000	6th	195.725
2001	3rd	197.275
2003	5th	196.050
2005	5th	196.575
2011	6th	196.425

=== Four on the Floor appearances ===
Michigan Wolverines Four on the Floor Appearances
Year	Finish	Score
2021	1st	198.250

=== Individual champions ===
Michigan Wolverines Individual Champions
Name	Year	Event
Beth Wymer	1993	UB
Beth Wymer	1994	UB
Beth Wymer	1995	UB
Elise Ray	2001	AA
Elise Ray	2002	BB
Elise Ray	2004	UB
Kylee Botterman	2011	AA
Joanna Sampson	2013	FX
Natalie Wojcik	2019	BB

== Facilities ==
Michigan's home competitions are held at the 12,707-seat Crisler Center. In 2002, the 22,000-square-foot (2,000 m^{2}) Donald R. Shepherd Women's Gymnastics Training Center was dedicated. The Shepherd Center is the practice and training home of the women's gymnastics team. The facility has 17,000 square feet (1,600 m^{2}) of training space; the remaining 5,000 square feet (460 m^{2}) contains a training room, coaches offices, a locker room, a team lounge, and a study area.

== Roster ==
=== Current roster ===
Name	Year	Hometown	Club
Carly Bauman	GS	West Des Moines, IA	Chow's Gymnastics and Dance Institute
Kayli Boozer	JR	Texarkana, Texas	North East Texas Elite
Lily Clapper	SR	Ann Arbor, MI	Gym America
Peyton Davis	SO	West Chester, PA	First State Gymnastics
Sophia Diaz	SO	Clarksville, MD	Hill's Gymnastics
Amy Fukami	SO	Dublin, CA	San Mateo Gymnastics
Gabrielle Gauger	FR	Chicago, IL	IK Gymnastics
Reyna Guggino	GS	Tampa, FL	Tampa Bay Turners
Anelise Johnson	FR	East Lansing, MI	Capital City Flips
Ava Jordan	JR	Indianapolis, IN	DeVeaus' School of Gymnastics
Katelyn Kelly	FR	Clarkston, MI	Euro Stars Gymnastics
Myli Lew	FR	Belmont, CA	San Mateo Gymnastics
Farah Lipetz	SO	Northport, NY	Infiniti Elite Gymnastic
Sophie Parenti	SO	Los Altos, CA	West Valley Gymnastics
Jahzara Ranger	SO	Coconut Creek, FL	American Twisters
Audrey Sanger	SO	Oakland, CA	Pacific West Gymnastics
Paige Thaxton	SR	Westland, MI	Michigan Academy of Gymnastics
Quincy Walters	FR	Southlake, TX	Texas Dream Gymnastics
Haylen Zabrowski	JR	Parkland, FL	America Twisters

== Past Olympians ==
- Elise Ray (2000)
