= Minnesota Golden Gophers women's gymnastics =

Women's gymnastic team representing University of Minnesota

- Founded: 1974
- University: University of Minnesota
- Head coach: Jenny Hansen (11th season)
- Conference: Big Ten
- Location: Twin Cities, Minnesota
- Home arena: Maturi Pavilion (Capacity: 5,700)
- Nickname: Minnesota Golden Gophers
- Colors: Maroon and gold

Four on the Floor appearances
- 2026

NCAA Regional championships
- 1980, 1982, 1997, 2002, 2013, 2016, 2021, 2022, 2026

NCAA Tournament appearances
- 1983, 1984, 1987, 1988, 1989, 1990, 1994, 1996, 1997, 1998, 1999, 2000, 2001, 2002, 2003, 2004, 2005, 2006, 2007, 2008, 2009, 2010, 2011, 2012, 2013, 2014, 2015, 2016, 2017, 2018, 2019, 2021, 2022, 2023, 2024, 2025, 2026

Conference championships
- 1988, 1989, 1991, 1998, 2006, 2021

The Minnesota Golden Gophers represent the University of Minnesota, Twin Cities in women's gymnastics. They are coached by Jenny Hansen. The Gophers have 6 Big Ten Conference titles, most recently in 2021. The Gophers have had two athletes win NCAA championships, with Marie Roethlisberger taking the NCAA title for uneven bars in 1990 and Brooklyn Rowray taking the title for balance beam in 2026.

== History ==
Head coaches
	Name	Seasons
1	Katalin Deli	1974 – 1992
2	Jim Stephenson	1993 – 2010
3	Meg Stephenson	1998 – 2014
4	Jenny Hansen	2015 – Present

The Minnesota gymnastics program competed its first season in 1974 in AIAW competition, joining the NCAA for the 1983 season. Katalin Deli was hired as the first coach in 1973 and quickly established the team as a contender for regional and conference titles; she was named Big Ten Coach of the Year for the 1989 and 1991 seasons. During her tenure Minnesota won three Big Ten conference titles as a team and Minnesota gymnasts won 21 individual event titles. Deli was fired following the 1992 season after gymnasts accidentally saw a sex tape of Deli and her husband, then-assistant coach Gabor Deli.

Jim Stephenson took over the program in 1993 and added his wife Meg Stephenson as co-head coach in 1998. Under the Stephensons, Minnesota advanced to the NCAA National Championships three times, finishing 10th in 1997, 9th in 2002, and 8th in 2013. Minnesota also added more Big Ten team titles, winning in 1998 and 2006. Jim stepped down as head coach in 2010, continuing to assist the team in a volunteer position.

In 2014, Meg Stephenson resigned due to controversy over her siding with her husband in a sexual harassment allegation, and allegedly retaliating against the student who made the claims. Assistant coach Jenny Hansen served as interim head coach for the 2015 season, before being officially promoted to the position.

The highest score ever recorded by the Minnesota gymnastics team is 197.750, at the 2021 conference championships.

== NCAA Championship appearances ==
=== Four on the Floor appearances ===
Minnesota Golden Gophers Four on the Floor Appearances
Year	Finish
2026	4th

== Roster ==
2026–27 Roster
Name	Year	Hometown
Regan Bacciocco	FR	Milwaukee, WI
Avalie Brinn	FR	Palm City, FL
Teryn Crump	JR	Pflugerville, TX
Daelin Diaz-Luong	FR	Cornelius, NC
Leah Gonsiorowski	SR	Milton, WI
McCauley Harrington	SR	Plano, TX
Isabella Nguyen	SO	Minnetonka, MN
Sophia Nguyen	SR	Minnetonka, MN
Jenna Olshefski	SR	Grove City, OH
Arianna Ostrum	SO	Wisconsin Rapids, WI
Lindsay Pseja	FR	Westwood, NJ
Julia Rausa	FR	Vernon Hills, IL
Brooklyn Rowray	5th	Carlisle, IA
Lacie Saltzmann	SO	Charlotte, NC
Megan Steensland	5th	Eden Prairie, MN
Ava Stewart	JR	Bowmanville, ON
Sophie Swartzmiller	SR	Madison, WI

- Head coach: Jenny Hansen
- Assistant coach: Sam Scherwinski
- Assistant coach: Kiki Parenteau
- Assistant coach: Grace McCallum

== Past Olympians ==
- Ava Stewart (Canada) (2020, 2024)

== See also ==
- Minnesota Golden Gophers men's gymnastics
