= 2016 LSU Tigers women's gymnastics team =

American college gymnastics season

2016 LSU Tigers women's gymnastics
- Conference: Southeastern Conference
- Record: 31–6 (6–1 SEC)
- Head coach: D-D Breaux (39th season)
- Assistant coaches: Jay Clark (4th season); Bob Moore (16th season)
- Home stadium: Maravich Center

The 2016 LSU Tigers gymnastics team is to represent Louisiana State University in the sport of Artistic gymnastics during the 2016 NCAA Division I women's gymnastics season. The Tigers compete in the Southeastern Conference (SEC). They host their home meets at the Pete Maravich Assembly Center on the university's campus in Baton Rouge, Louisiana. The Tigers program is led by D-D Breaux who has been the head coach of the program for 39 seasons.

== Roster ==
2015-16 Roster
Name	Height	Year	Hometown	Club
Julianna Cannamela	5-1	FR	Waxhaw, NC	Southeastern
Sydney Ewing	5-0	JR	Lafayette, LA	Acadiana
Sarah Finnegan	5-1	FR	Lee's Summit, MO	GAGE
Michelle Gauthier	5-4	SR	Mandeville, LA	Northshore
Ashleigh Gnat	5-0	JR	Lake Mary, FL	ACE
Myia Hambrick	5-1	SO	Temple, GA	West Georgia
McKenna Kelley	5-1	FR	Houston, TX	Stars
Erin Macadaeg	4-9	SO	Redwood City, CA	San Mateo
Kylie Moran	5-2	SO	St. Petersburg, FL	Tampa Bay Turners
Lexie Priessman	5-0	FR	Cincinnati, OH	Perfection Gymnastics School
Jessica Savona	4-11	SR	Mississauga, Ontario	Oakville
Kaitlyn Szafranski	5-2	FR	Orefield, PA	Parkettes
Randii Wyrick	5-5	SR	Las Vegas, NV	Brown's Gymnastics
Shae Zamardi	5-3	JR	Vancouver Island, BC	Flicka

- Head coach: D-D Breaux
- Assistant head coach: Jay Clark
- Assistant coach: Bob Moore
- Volunteer coach: Ashleigh Clare-Kearney

== Previous season ==
The 2015 Tigers team came into the 2015 season ranked #5 in the Coaches Preseason Poll. They finished the regular season with an almost undefeated run – losing to the Oklahoma Sooners during the Metroplex Challenge, in late January. The Tigers placed second at the SEC Championships, and first at the NCAA Ames Regional. The Tigers advanced to Nationals in Fort Worth, Texas – placing fifth in their session. As a result, the Tigers didn't advance to the Super Six. The program had six participants in the Event Finals also.

== Schedule ==
LSU's 2016 schedule is a 10-week long regular season – consisting of five home and five away meets. As part of their away meet campaign, the Tigers will participate in the Metroplex Challenge in Fort Worth, Texas (against Missouri, Oklahoma, Stanford and Washington), the Lady Luck Invitational in Las Vegas, NV – a neutral site against NC State, and a quad meet at Texas Woman's against New Hampshire and Oregon State. Tigers will host SEC rivals, Kentucky, Arkansas, Auburn and Alabama – as well as the Oklahoma Sooners to open their 2016 campaign. The Tigers will travel to conference rivals Georgia and Florida.

2016 Schedule
Date	Time (CT)	Opponent	Rank	Site	TV	Result	Attendance	Ref.
Saturday, January 9	4:00 p.m.	#1 Oklahoma Sooners (Note: denotes non-conference rival(s))	5	PMAC • Baton Rouge, LA	SECN+	W, 196.950-196.725	8,228	
Thursday, January 14	9:00 p.m.	#21 NC State Wolfpack	1	South Point Hotel • Las Vegas, NV		W, 195.825-193.625	1,100	
Friday, January 22	7:30 p.m.	#20 Kentucky Wildcats	7	PMAC • Baton Rouge, LA	SECN+	W, 196.575-195.100	10,052	
Saturday, January 30	7:00 p.m.	Metroplex Challenge (Note: Metroplex Challenge opponents: #20 Missouri Tigers, #2 Oklahoma Sooners, #12 Stanford Cardinal, and Washington Huskies)	6	FWCC • Fort Worth, TX		2nd, 196.750	2,000	
Friday, February 5	7:30 p.m.	#8 Arkansas Razorbacks	6	PMAC • Baton Rouge, LA	SECN	W, 197.425-196.150	7,779	
Saturday, February 13	3:00 p.m.	#11 Georgia Bulldogs	5	Coleman Coliseum • Athens, GA	SECN+	L, 196.800-197.525	9,577	
Friday, February 19	7:30 p.m.	#8 Auburn Tigers	6	PMAC • Baton Rouge, LA	SECN	W, 197.825-197.125	10,177	
Friday, February 26	6:00 p.m.	#2 Florida Gators	7	O'Connell Center • Gainesville, FL	SECN	W, 197.900-197.875	7,129	
Friday, March 4	7:30 p.m.	#3 Alabama Crimson Tide	4	PMAC • Baton Rouge, LA	SECN+	W, 197.925-196.225	13,296	
Saturday, March 12	6:00 p.m.	TWU's Quad Meet (Note: TWU's Quad Meet opponents: NR Texas Woman's Pioneers, #16 Oregon State Beavers, and NR New Hampshire Wildcats)	3	Kitty Magee Arena • Denton, TX		1st, 197.825		
Saturday, March 19	5:00 p.m.	SEC Championships (Note: SEC Championships opponents: #2 Florida Gators, #4 Alabama Crimson Tide, #6 Auburn Tigers, #8 Georgia Bulldogs, #13 Arkansas Razorbacks, #22 Kentucky Wildcats, #20 Missouri Tigers)	3	Verizon Arena • Little Rock, AR	SECN+	3rd,197.500		
Saturday, April 2	3:00 p.m.	NCAA Athens Regional (Note: NCAA Athens Regional opponents: #10 Georgia Bulldogs, #15 Oregon State Beavers, NR Arizona Wildcats, NR George Washington Colonials, and NR Michigan State Spartans)	3	Coleman Coliseum • Athens, GA	SECN+	1st, 197.300	4,994	
Friday, April 15	1:00 p.m.	NCAA Semifinal (Note: NCAA Semifinal opponents: #2 Florida Gators, #10 Georgia Bulldogs, #18 Stanford Cardinal, #6 Auburn Tigers, and #14 Minnesota Golden Gophers)	3	FWCC • Fort Worth, TX	ESPNU	2nd, 197.3375	3,903	
Saturday April 16	8:00 p.m.	NCAA Super Six (Note: NCAA Super Six opponents:#1 Oklahoma Sooners, #4 Alabama Crimson Tide, #2 Florida Gators, #8 UCLA Bruins, and #10 Georgia Bulldogs)	3	FWCC • Fort Worth, TX	ESPNU	2nd, 197.4500	8,338	
