= 2019 LSU Tigers women's gymnastics team =

American college gymnastics season

2019 LSU Tigers women's gymnastics
- Conference: Southeastern Conference
- Record: 0-0-0 (0-0-0 SEC)
- Head coach: D-D Breaux (41st season)
- Assistant coaches: Jay Clark (6th season); Bob Moore (19th season); Ashleigh Clare-Kearney (8th season)
- Home arena: Pete Maravich Assembly Center

The 2019 LSU Tigers women's gymnastics team represented Louisiana State University in the 2019 NCAA Division I women's gymnastics season as members of the Southeastern Conference in their 44th season of collegiate competition. The Tigers' home meets will take place at the Pete Maravich Assembly Center in Baton Rouge, Louisiana. They were led by head coach D-D Breaux in her forty-first season at the helm of the program. The Tigers looked to build on a fourth place finish at the 2018 NCAA Women's Gymnastics Championship.

== Previous season ==
The Tigers finished the 2018 season with an overall record of 33-5. In the postseason, the Tigers won the 2018 Southeastern Conference Championships—their third conference title. Subsequently LSU entered the NCAA Regional competition as the No. 2 national seed, winning the Raleigh regional and advancing to Nationals. At the National Championships, the Tigers finished second in the first semi-final and advanced to the Super Six where they eventually finished fourth. Seven members of the 2018 Tigers cohort received All-American honors.

== Off season ==
=== Departures ===
Name	Class	Hometown	Reason for leaving	2018 events
Myia Hambrick	SR	Temple, GA	Graduated	VT/UB/BB/FX
Lauren Li	SR	Plano, TX	Graduated	—
Erin Macadaeg	SR	Redwood City, CA	Graduated	VT/BB/FX
Gracen Standley	FR	Cincinnati, OH	Moved to a crew position	—

=== 2018 recruiting class ===
Name	Hometown	Club	Level	Commit date
Rebecca D'Antonio	New Orleans, LA	Cypress Pointe	Level 10	—
Bailey Ferrer	Ocoee, FL	Gymnastics USA	Level 10	March 6, 2015

== Schedule ==
=== Postseason ===
Date	Time	Opponent	Site	Result
March 23	TBD p.m.	Conference Championships	Smoothie King Center; New Orleans, LA	
April 4 – 6	TBD p.m.	NCAA Regional	Pete Maravich Assembly Center; Baton Rouge, LA	
April 19 – 20	TBD p.m.	NCAA Women's Gymnastics championship	Fort Worth Convention Center; Fort Worth, TX	
All times are in Eastern time

== Roster ==
2018–19
Name	Height	Year	Hometown	Club
Reagan Campbell	5–1	SO	Coppell, TX	Texas Dreams
Julianna Cannamela	5–1	SR	Waxhaw, NC	Southeastern
Rebecca D'Antonio	5–0	FR	New Orleans, LA	Cypress Pointe Gymnastics
Bridget Dean	5–2	SO	Fort Myers, FL	Orlando Metro
Christina Desiderio	5–0	SO	Hackettstown, NJ	Parkettes
Sami Durante	5–1	SO	Athens, GA	Georgia Elite
Kennedi Edney	5–3	JR	Chino, CA	Precision
Sarah Edwards	4-11	SO	Ocean Springs, MS	Lanier's Gymnastics
Sarah Finnegan	5–1	SR	Lee's Summit, MO	GAGE
Bailey Ferrer		FR	Ocoee, FL	Gymnastics USA Longwood
Olivia Gunter	5-2	SO	Mandeville, LA	North Shore Gymnastics
Ruby Harrold	5-3	JR	Bristol, England	The Academy
McKenna Kelley	5–1	R-JR	Houston, TX	Stars Gymnastics
Ashlyn Kirby	5–2	JR	Claremont, NC	Shooting Stars
Lexie Priessman	5–0	SR	Cincinnati, OH	Cincinnati Gymnastics Academy/Perfection

== Coaching staff ==
Name	Position	Years	Alma mater
D-D Breaux	Head Coach	41st	LSU
Jay Clark	Associate head coach	6th	Georgia
Bob Moore	Assistant Coach	19th	Samford
Ashleigh Gnat	Student Assistant Coach		LSU
Katie Copeland	Director of Operations	5th	LSU
Ashleigh Clare-Kearney	Volunteer Coach	8th	LSU
