= Alex McMurtry =

American artistic gymnast

- Full name: Alexandra Claire McMurtry
- Born: December 8, 1996 (age 29) Brighton, Michigan, U.S.
- Height: 5 ft 3 in (160 cm)

Gymnastics career
- Discipline: Women's artistic gymnastics
- College team: Florida Gators (2015–18)
- Club: Richmond Olympiad Gymnastics
- Former coaches: Boris and Larissa Choutkin
- Retired: May 30, 2018
Medal record
Representing Richmond Olympiad
Nastia Liukin Cup
Gold medal – first place	2013 Worcester	All-Around
Silver medal – second place	2012 New York	All-Around
Representing Florida Gators
NCAA Gymnastics Championships
Gold medal – first place	2015 Fort Worth	Team
Gold medal – first place	2017 St. Louis	All-Around
Gold medal – first place	2017 St. Louis	Uneven Bars
Gold medal – first place	2018 St. Louis	Vault
Silver medal – second place	2017 St. Louis	Vault
Bronze medal – third place	2017 St. Louis	Team
Bronze medal – third place	2017 St. Louis	Balance Beam
Bronze medal – third place	2017 St. Louis	Floor Exercise
Bronze medal – third place	2018 St. Louis	Team
Bronze medal – third place	2018 St. Louis	Uneven Bars

Alexandra Claire McMurtry (born December 8, 1996) is an American former artistic gymnast. She is the 2013 Nastia Liukin Cup champion and the 2017 NCAA Champion. She competed in NCAA gymnastics for the Florida Gators and was the 10th person in NCAA history to record a Gym Slam.

== Early life and education ==
McMurtry was born in Commerce Township, Michigan, to David and Christine McMurtry and has two siblings. She graduated from James River High School in 2014 and started up at the University of Florida that fall and was part of their gymnastics team. McMurtry graduated summa cum laude in August 2018 with degree in Applied Physiology & Kinesiology–Exercise Physiology.

== Gymnastics career ==
=== Junior Olympic Level 10 ===
==== 2011 – 2012 ====
McMurtry competed at the 2011 Women's Junior Olympic Level 10 National Championships in Long Beach, California. She won the all-around title with 38.575 points, ahead of silver medalist Maggie Nichols. She also tied for the highest score on vault with a 9.950 and floor with a score of 9.650.

In 2012 McMurtry competed at the Atlanta Crown Invitational where she placed first in the all-around and qualifier for the Nastia Liukin Cup. There she placed second behind Charity Jones. At the 2012 Women's Junior Olympic Level 10 National Championships, McMurtry once again placed first.

==== 2013 – 2014 ====
In early 2013, McMurtry verbally committed to attend the University of Florida on a gymnastics scholarship. In March 2013 McMurtry once again competed at the Nastia Liukin Cup; this time she finished in first place. At the 2013 Women's Junior Olympic Level 10 National Championships she finished in second place behind future Florida Gator teammate Alicia Boren. At the 2014 Women's Junior Olympic Level 10 National Championships, McMurtry finished in eighth place after a disappointing uneven bars performance. She finished first on vault.

=== NCAA ===
==== 2014–2015 ====
As a freshman in 2015, McMurtry regularly contributed to the Florida gymnastics team on vault, bars and beam during the regular season, and also saw action on floor. She was ranked #1 in the nation on vault at the end of the regular season on March 16, 2015.

==== 2015–2016 ====
McMurtry made her floor exercise debut in a match against LSU. She received two perfect 10s on uneven bars.

==== 2016–2017 ====
McMurtry won the all-around at both the Southeastern Conference Championships and at the 2017 NCAA Women's Gymnastics Championship. Additionally she won the Honda Sports Award and the NCAA Elite 90 Award, an award given to the student-athlete with the highest GPA at each of the 90 NCAA championship sites.

==== 2017–2018 ====
On January 26, McMurtry earned a perfect 10 on balance beam, thus completing a Gym Slam – earning a perfect 10 on each apparatus. She is the second Florida Gator to achieve this feat after Bridget Sloan. Later in the season McMurtry won the gold on vault at both the Southeastern Conference Championships and at the 2018 NCAA Women's Gymnastics Championship. She was also awarded the NCAA's Today's Top 10 Award.

==== Career perfect 10.0 ====
Season	Date	Event	Meet
2015	Jan 16, 2015	Vault	Florida vs Auburn
2016	Jan 29, 2016	Uneven Bars	Florida vs Alabama
2016	Mar 11, 2016	Uneven Bars	Florida vs North Carolina
2017	Feb 10, 2017	Uneven Bars	Florida vs Georgia
2017	Feb 24, 2017	Floor Exercise	Florida vs Missouri
2017	Mar 5, 2017	Vault	Florida @ LSU
2017	Apr 15, 2017	Uneven Bars	Super Six
2018	Jan 26, 2018	Vault	Florida vs Oklahoma
2018	Jan 26, 2018	Balance Beam	Florida vs Oklahoma

== Competitive history ==
Year	Event	Team	AA	VT	UB	BB	FX
Level 10
2011	J.O. National Championships		1st place, gold medalist(s)	1st place, gold medalist(s)	4	4	1st place, gold medalist(s)
2012	Atlanta Crown Invitational		1st place, gold medalist(s)	1st place, gold medalist(s)	1st place, gold medalist(s)	1st place, gold medalist(s)	1st place, gold medalist(s)
2012	Nastia Liukin Cup		2nd place, silver medalist(s)				
2012	J.O. National Championships		1st place, gold medalist(s)	2nd place, silver medalist(s)	3rd place, bronze medalist(s)	3rd place, bronze medalist(s)	1st place, gold medalist(s)
2012	Christmas on the Chesapeake		1st place, gold medalist(s)	1st place, gold medalist(s)	1st place, gold medalist(s)	1st place, gold medalist(s)	1st place, gold medalist(s)
2013	Nastia Liukin Cup		1st place, gold medalist(s)				
2013	J.O. National Championships		2nd place, silver medalist(s)	2nd place, silver medalist(s)	12	6	2nd place, silver medalist(s)
2014	J.O. National Championships		8	1st place, gold medalist(s)	44	6	7
NCAA
2015	SEC Championships	3rd place, bronze medalist(s)		1st place, gold medalist(s)			
2015	NCAA Championships	1st place, gold medalist(s)				8	
2016	SEC Championships	1st place, gold medalist(s)	2nd place, silver medalist(s)	11	3rd place, bronze medalist(s)	1st place, gold medalist(s)	7
2016	NCAA Championships	4	6				
2017	SEC Championships	2nd place, silver medalist(s)	1st place, gold medalist(s)	2nd place, silver medalist(s)	3rd place, bronze medalist(s)	5	1st place, gold medalist(s)
2017	NCAA Championships	3rd place, bronze medalist(s)	1st place, gold medalist(s)	2nd place, silver medalist(s)	1st place, gold medalist(s)	3rd place, bronze medalist(s)	3rd place, bronze medalist(s)
2018	SEC Championships	3rd place, bronze medalist(s)	14	1st place, gold medalist(s)	1st place, gold medalist(s)	7	
2018	NCAA Championships	3rd place, bronze medalist(s)	5	1st place, gold medalist(s)	3rd place, bronze medalist(s)		

Awards
Preceded by Bridget Sloan	Honda Sports Award (gymnastics); 2017	Succeeded by Peng-Peng Lee
