= Maggie Nichols (gymnast) =

American artistic gymnast (born 1997)

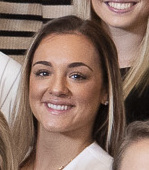
- Nichols in 2019

Personal information
- Full name: Margaret Mary Nichols
- Born: September 12, 1997 (age 29) Little Canada, Minnesota, U.S.
- Height: 5 ft 6 in (168 cm)

Gymnastics career
- Discipline: Women's artistic gymnastics
- Country represented: United States; (2013–2016)
- College team: Oklahoma Sooners (2017–2020)
- Club: Twin City Twisters
- Head coaches: Sarah Jantzi; Rich Stenger; K. J. Kindler
- Retired: March 12, 2020
- Awards: See awards
Medal record
Representing United States
World Championships
| Gold medal – first place | 2015 Glasgow | Team |
| Bronze medal – third place | 2015 Glasgow | Floor Exercise |
Pan American Championships
| Gold medal – first place | 2014 Mississauga | Team |
| Bronze medal – third place | 2014 Mississauga | All Around |
FIG World Cup
Event / 1st / 2nd / 3rd; All-Around World Cup / 0 / 1 / 1
Representing Oklahoma Sooners
NCAA Championships
| Gold medal – first place | 2017 St Louis | Team |
| Gold medal – first place | 2017 St Louis | Uneven Bars |
| Gold medal – first place | 2018 St Louis | All Around |
| Gold medal – first place | 2018 St Louis | Uneven Bars |
| Gold medal – first place | 2018 St Louis | Floor Exercise |
| Gold medal – first place | 2019 Fort Worth | All Around |
| Gold medal – first place | 2019 Fort Worth | Vault |
| Gold medal – first place | 2019 Fort Worth | Team |
| Silver medal – second place | 2019 Fort Worth | Uneven Bars |
| Silver medal – second place | 2018 St Louis | Team |
| Silver medal – second place | 2018 St Louis | Balance Beam |
- Awards: See awards

Margaret Mary Nichols (born September 12, 1997) is an American former artistic gymnast. She represented the United States in international competitions, including the 2015 World Artistic Gymnastics Championships, where she won a gold medal with the American team and an individual bronze medal on floor exercise. At the USA Gymnastics National Championships, she was the bronze medalist in the all-around and on uneven bars and floor exercise in 2014 and the silver medalist in the all-around in 2015. Before a knee injury in early 2016, she was a contender for the U.S. women's gymnastics team at the 2016 Summer Olympics.

Nichols competed in collegiate gymnastics for the Oklahoma Sooners where she was an eight-time NCAA Champion. She was the ninth NCAA gymnast to complete a Gym Slam, the first to do so for Oklahoma, and the first NCAA gymnast to have achieved it twice.

== Senior career ==
=== 2013 ===
Nichols was added to the national team in March and was selected to represent the United States at the City of Jesolo Trophy and the Germany-Romania-USA Friendly. At the City of Jesolo Trophy, she finished first with the team and sixth in the all-around, and won a silver medal on the floor exercise.

At the U.S. Classic, Nichols finished sixth in the all-around, eleventh on uneven bars, eighth on balance beam, and fifth on floor exercise. At the National Championships, she placed fifth in the all-around and on balance beam, sixth on uneven bars, and ninth on floor exercise.

=== 2014 ===
At her second City of Jesolo Trophy, Nichols finished first with the team and third in the all-around. At the Tokyo World Cup, she finished third in the all-around.

She went on to place third in the all-around and on floor exercise at the U.S. Classic, as well as fifth on uneven bars and seventh on balance beam. At the National Championships in August, she placed third in the all-around behind reigning world all-around champion Simone Biles and 2012 Olympic gold medalist Kyla Ross. She also placed third on uneven bars and floor exercise and fourth on balance beam.

Nichols helped the United States finish first at the Pan American Gymnastics Championships in Mississauga, Canada, and placed third in the all-around competition with a score of 55.500. However, she dislocated her kneecap on floor exercise during the team final and withdrew from the selection camp for the 2014 World Championships team.

=== 2015 ===
At the City of Jesolo Trophy, Nichols finished first with the team and seventh in the all-around.

On July 25, she competed at the U.S. Classic and finished third in the all-around, behind Biles, the now two-time reigning world all-around champion, and 2012 Olympic all-around champion Gabby Douglas. She debuted her Amanar vault, scoring 15.80, and finished fifth on uneven bars and balance beam with scores of 14.95 and 14.45, respectively. She also placed third on floor exercise with a 14.80, for a total all-around score of 60.000.

The following month, Nichols competed at the 2015 U.S. National Championships in Indianapolis. On the first night of competition, she led for the first three rotations, scoring 15.80 for her Amanar vault, 14.95 on uneven bars, and 14.40 on balance beam, where she debuted several new skills, including a tucked Barani and a switch ring leap, and dismounted with a full-twisting double tuck. However, she incurred a one-tenth deduction for exceeding the time limit for balance beam routines. She also scored 14.55 on floor. Her all-around total for the night was 59.700, 1.400 points behind Biles.

On night two, she began on bars with a 14.8. During her beam warm-up, she fell on her full-twisting double back dismount and decided to change it to a simpler double pike. She scored a 14.65, higher than her score on night one despite losing three-tenths in start value. On floor, she stumbled out of bounds on her double-double mount, incurring a three-tenth deduction, and scored a relatively low 14.15. She finished the competition on vault, where she scored 15.85 to finish in second place with a two-night total of 119.150.

At the 2015 World Artistic Gymnastics Championships, Nichols competed on vault, balance beam, and floor exercise in the preliminary round. During the team final, she competed on all four events, contributing an all-around total of 59.232 toward the U.S. women's gold-medal finish. She also qualified for the floor event final where she earned a bronze medal.

=== 2016 ===
Nichols competed at the 2016 American Cup on March 5, scoring 59.699 to place second behind Douglas. Afterward, U.S. national team coordinator Márta Károlyi said, "Maggie showed again that I can rely on her."

A month later, Nichols tore her meniscus while training her Amanar vault and had to withdraw from the 2016 Pacific Rim Gymnastics Championships in Seattle. She underwent arthroscopic knee surgery and was out of competition for two months.

In June, she returned to competition at the National Championships. She performed only on the uneven bars and balance beam, finishing 13th and 10th, respectively, and advanced to the Olympic Trials in July. There, she finished sixth in the all-around, fifth on vault, ninth on uneven bars, eighth on balance beam, and fourth on floor exercise. She was not chosen for the Olympic team nor as an alternate athlete. Notably, she was the first known gymnast to report Larry Nassar's sexual abuse to USA Gymnastics in June 2015, which the organization subsequently covered up in the USA Gymnastics sex abuse scandal. Károlyi explained that she was not chosen even as an alternate because while she had performed well at the Trials, her score was not in the top 3 on any event which made her of no possible benefit in a team final format. However, the decision to exclude Nichols from the team entirely was controversial given her second-place finish in the 2015 US National Championships and her sixth-place finish at the Trials.

A few days after the conclusion of the Olympic Trials on July 13, 2016, Nichols announced her retirement from elite gymnastics via Instagram and interview, and said she was taking time to rest before starting her NCAA career at the University of Oklahoma in August.

== College career ==
Nichols committed to the Oklahoma Sooners women's gymnastics team in 2015 with a full athletic scholarship.

=== 2016–17 ===
Nichols made her collegiate debut at the Sooners' home opener against Alabama. She won the uneven bars title with a near perfect score of 9.975 and also claimed titles on floor exercise and in the all-around.

In the 2016–2017 season, as a freshman majoring in health and exercise science, she made the competitive lineup on all four events and scored at least one perfect 10 on each. As of Week 5, she led the NCAA standings in all four events and the all-around. She finished the regular season in first place in the all-around, ahead of Utah's MyKayla Skinner; second on vault, behind Ashleigh Gnat of LSU; second on uneven bars, behind Kyla Ross of UCLA; tied for second on balance beam with Oklahoma teammate Chayse Capps, behind UCLA's Katelyn Ohashi; and tied for first on floor exercise with Skinner. At the 2017 NCAA Championships, she had a surprising fall on balance beam, her first major mistake of the entire season, missing out on the all-around podium despite being favored to win. However, she performed well on the other events, including uneven bars, where she finished first in a six-way tie. She also helped Oklahoma qualify to the Super Six. In the Super Six final, Nichols scored a ten on balance beam – the same event that she fell on the day before – en route to Oklahoma's victory in the finals, defending their national title. This also ensured Oklahoma's first ever undefeated season in program history.

=== 2017–18 ===
The Sooners traveled to Georgia for a dual meet to open the season. Nichols won the uneven bars title with a score of 9.925 and scored a 9.9 on floor exercise, tying for that title with her teammate AJ Jackson and Georgia's Sabrina Vega.

At the first home meet of the season, against Iowa State and Texas Woman's, Nichols won the uneven bars, balance beam, and all-around titles. The following week, the Sooners traveled to Gainesville, where they lost to the Florida Gators by a margin of just .025, despite Nichols' titles on uneven bars (tied with teammate Anastasia Webb), floor exercise (tied with Florida's Kennedy Baker), and in the all-around.

Continuing the season with a dual meet at UCLA, Nichols notched her first 10 of the season en route to the event title on balance beam (sharing the title with Webb and Peng-Peng Lee of UCLA). She also shared the uneven bars title with teammate Nicole Lehrmann and won the all-around with a score of 39.9. She followed up this remarkable performance by repeating her perfect 10 on balance beam at the following week's dual meet versus North Carolina. She also earned a share of the vault and uneven bars titles and again won the all-around. Said head coach K. J. Kindler, "Maggie's beam routine was a great beam routine. She even upgraded from last week. Last week she got a 10 but she didn't do the front tuck. The front tuck is an extremely difficult skill. That routine was definitely a highlight on beam."

The Sooners next competed against Nebraska at the Perfect 10 Challenge held at the Cox Convention Center in Oklahoma City. There Nichols earned the balance beam and floor exercise titles by scoring 9.95 on each event. She also earned the all-around title with a score of 39.6.

Competing at home against West Virginia, Nichols swept all four event titles and the all-around title (she shared the vault title with teammates Webb and Brenna Dowell and West Virginia's Kirah Koshinski). She repeated her sweep of the individual titles (sharing the uneven bars title with teammate Lehrmann) the following week while competing against Michigan. She earned perfect 10s on vault and balance beam and tied her season-high all-around score of 39.9. The Sooners finished their home stretch with a quad meet against Arkansas, Arizona State, and Denver, where Nichols earned titles on balance beam and in the all-around.

Oklahoma ended the regular season by traveling to Alabama and Texas Woman's. At Alabama, Nichols earned a perfect 10 on vault and also won titles on uneven bars, balance beam, and in the all-around. Competing at Texas Woman's just two days later, she earned a perfect 10 on floor exercise, as well as titles on vault, balance beam (tied with teammates Natalie Brown and Bre Showers) and in the all-around.

At the Big 12 Championships, the Sooners won their seventh-straight team title, and Nichols won the all-around title with a score of 39.675. She also shared the floor exercise title with teammates Dowell and Webb, Maddie Karr of Denver, and Haylee Young of Iowa State. She was also named the Big 12 Gymnast of the Year.

At regionals in Minneapolis, Nichols helped the Sooners qualify to the national championships by scoring a perfect 10 on balance beam. She also earned additional titles on floor exercise and in the all-around. For the second year in a row, she was named the South Central Region Gymnast of the Year. “It was so special for me, especially in front of the home crowd," Nichols said. “It was my hard work paying off, and I'm so happy I could do it for my team.”

At the national championships in St. Louis, Nichols and the Sooners competed against Utah, Florida, Washington, California, and Kentucky in Semifinal II. Oklahoma qualified to the Super Six by winning the meet with a score of 198.050. Nichols became all-around national champion by posting a 39.8125, which tied the championship record. She also earned a share of the floor exercise title (tied with Katelyn Ohashi of UCLA) and, with a perfect 10 on uneven bars, earned her third individual national title of the season and competed a Gym Slam for the second season in a row. Said Kindler, "I am really proud of her. She has had a really unique year probably like no one else, and her strength showed through. It was tough, and to come out on this side this year is really special.” Nichols was named a First Team All-American on uneven bars, balance beam, floor exercise, and in the all-around, and a Second Team All-American on vault.

During the Super Six finals, Nichols contributed a 9.9375 on vault, a 9.9625 on uneven bars, a 9.9125 on balance beam, and a 9.9625 on floor exercise, but Oklahoma ultimately finished second to UCLA by only .0375.

=== 2018–19 ===
On December 13, 2018, it was announced that Nichols would receive the 2019 NCAA Inspiration Award for coming forward as "Athlete A" (the first to report former USA Gymnastics team doctor Larry Nassar to USA Gymnastics) and publicly addressing the sexual abuse she endured. She was one of two recipients for 2019, alongside current NFL player Shaquem Griffin, who starred at UCF despite having only one hand.

During the first meet of the season, Nichols earned a perfect 10 on vault. The following week she sat out the competition after bruising her heel. She spent the remainder of the season only competing on two events, uneven bars and balance beam, hoping to return to the all-around in the post-season. Nichols helped Oklahoma earn their eighth straight Big 12 Conference Championship and individually Nichols won the balance beam title and was a co-champion on the uneven bars.

At the 2019 NCAA Championships Nichols made her return to the all-around, where she won the all-around with a score of 39.7125, beating Ross of UCLA and Lexy Ramler of Minnesota. She additionally was co-champion on the vault alongside Ross, Kennedi Edney of LSU, and Derrian Gobourne of Auburn and placed second on uneven bars behind Sarah Finnegan of LSU. The following day Nichols helped Oklahoma win the team title and finish the season undefeated.

On May 7 it was announced that Nichols would be awarded the Honda Sports Award for gymnastics for 2019, becoming the third Sooner to receive the award after softball player Keilani Ricketts and fellow gymnast Kelly Garrison. She beat out finalists Brenna Dowell, Sarah Finnegan, and Kyla Ross. On May 15 Nichols was awarded the Wilma Rudolph Student-Athlete Achievement Award.

=== 2019–20 ===
Nichols opened the season competing at the Collegiate Challenge where she competed the all-around and helped Oklahoma finish first. Individually she placed second in the all-around behind Ross but recorded the highest uneven bars score at the competition. During the meet against Alabama Nichols earned a perfect 10 on vault and won the all-around with a score of 39.825.

On March 12, 2020, the NCAA canceled all remaining championships for the 2019–2020 season due to the COVID-19 pandemic, effectively ending the college gymnastics season.

On March 13, 2020, Nichols and senior classmates Jade Degouveia and Bre Showers released a statement calling their four years at Oklahoma "a dream come true" and stating that they are "content in knowing we poured our hearts and souls into this season and sport" despite being "completely devastated" by the premature end of the season.

On March 24, 2020, Nichols was named a First Team All-American in the all-around and in all four events. Nichols was also named to the All-Big 12 team in the all-around and in all four events and was named the Big 12 Gymnast of the Year for the second time in her career. In April Nichols was awarded the AAI Award, becoming the first recipient from Oklahoma.

=== Career perfect 10.0 ===
| Year | Date | Apparatus | Opponents | Meet Description |
|---|---|---|---|---|
| 2017 | Sat, Jan 21 | VT | @ West Virginia | (A) |
| 2017 | Fri, Feb 03 | BB | vs. Denver, Nebraska, Texas Woman's | (H) |
| 2017 | Fri, Feb 10 | FX | @ Auburn | (A) Perfect 10 Challenge |
| 2017 | Fri, Feb 17 | BB | vs. Georgia, LSU, Missouri | (H) GymQuarters Invitational |
| 2017 | Sat, Mar 04 | UB | @ Michigan | (A) |
| 2017 | Sat, Mar 18 | VT | vs. Denver, Iowa State, West Virginia | (A) Big 12 Championships |
| 2017 | Fri, Apr 15 | BB | Alabama, Florida, LSU, UCLA, Utah | (A) NCAA Championships Super Six |
| 2018 | Sun, Feb 04 | BB | @ UCLA | (A) |
| 2018 | Sun, Feb 11 | BB | vs. North Carolina | (H) |
| 2018 | Sat, Mar 03 | VT | vs. Michigan | (H) |
| 2018 | Sat, Mar 03 | BB | vs. Michigan | (H) |
| 2018 | Fri, Mar 16 | VT | @ Alabama | (A) |
| 2018 | Sun, Mar 18 | FX | @ Texas Woman's | (A) |
| 2018 | Sat, Apr 07 | BB | vs. Denver, Iowa, Iowa State, Kentucky, Minnesota | (A) NCAA Regional, Minneapolis |
| 2018 | Fri, Apr 20 | UB | vs. California, Florida, Kentucky, Utah, Washington | (A) NCAA Championship Semifinals II |
| 2019 | Sat, Jan 05 | VT | @ Arkansas | (A) |
| 2019 | Sat, Apr 06 | UB | vs. California, Georgia, Kentucky | (A) NCAA Regional, Athens, Round 3 |
| 2020 | Fri, Jan 17 | VT | @ Alabama | (A) |
| 2020 | Mon, Jan 20 | VT | vs. Arkansas | (H) |
| 2020 | Fri, Feb 14 | VT | vs. West Virginia, TWU | (H) |
| 2020 | Fri, Feb 14 | UB | vs. West Virginia, TWU | (H) |
| 2020 | Fri, Mar 06 | VT | vs. Michigan | (H) |

=== Regular season final event ranking ===
| Season | AA | VT | UB | BB | FX |
|---|---|---|---|---|---|
| 2017 | 1 | 2 | 2 | 2t | 1t |
| 2018 | 1 | 1 | 7t | 3t | 1 |
| 2019 | na | na | 2 | 1 | na |

== Personal life ==
Nichols graduated from Roseville Area High School in 2016 and from University of Oklahoma with a bachelor's degree in communications and business and a Masters of Education in Intercollegiate Athletics Administration in 2022.

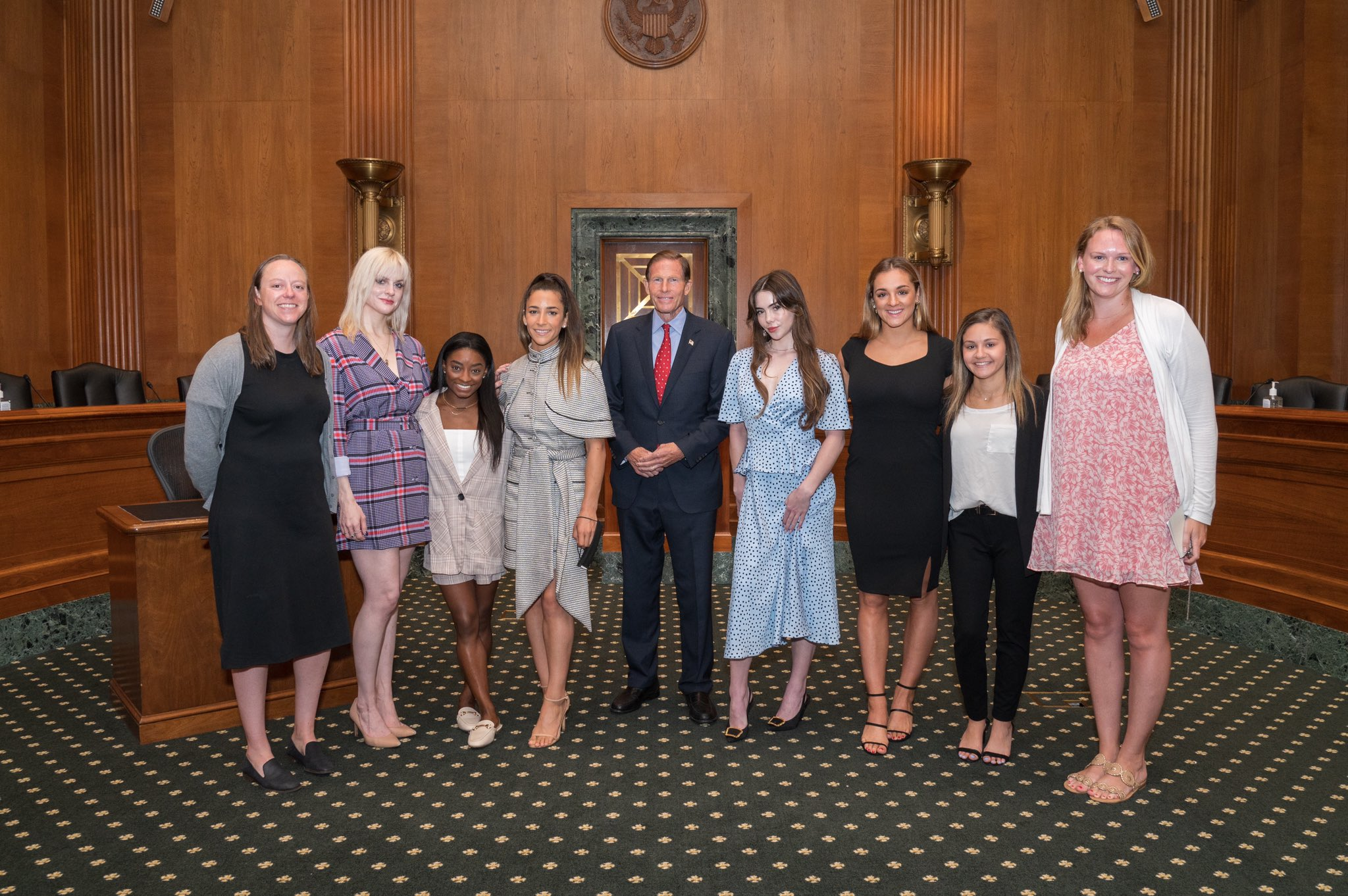
Nichols with Richard Blumenthal

In January 2018, Nichols came forward as one of the many victims sexually abused by former USA Gymnastics doctor Larry Nassar, starting when she was 15. Additionally Nichols revealed that it was her coach who initially reported Nassar and his abuse to the USA Gymnastics staff:

One day at practice, I was talking to my teammate, and brought up Dr. Nassar and his treatments. When I was talking to her, my coach overheard. I had never told my coach about these treatments. After hearing our conversation she asked me more questions about it and said it doesn't seem right ... so she did the right thing and reported this abuse to the USA Gymnastics staff.

On May 16, 2018, it was announced that Nichols and the other survivors would be awarded the Arthur Ashe Courage Award. Nichols' experience was highlighted in the Netflix documentary Athlete A, as well as the HBO documentary At the Heart of Gold.

In a column published March 27, 2020, Nichols stated that she would work as a student coach for the Sooners while completing her bachelor's degree and also indicated interest in sports broadcasting and writing a book. Her memoir, “Unstoppable!: My Journey from World Champion to Athlete A to 8-Time NCAA National Gymnastics Champion and Beyond”, was published on January 16, 2024.

As of 2024, she works as a certified personal trainer in South Padre Island, Texas. She also advocates for victims of abuse through her Maggie Nichols Foundation.

== Filmography ==
| Year | Title | Role | Notes |
|---|---|---|---|
| 2016 | AT&T American Cup | Self | TV special |
| 2016 | Today Show | Self | Episode dated April 5, 2016 |
| 2016 | The Ranch: Home of an American Sports Dynasty | Self | TV movie documentary |
| 2020 | Athlete A | Self | Documentary Film |
| 2020 | Access Hollywood | Self | Episode #24.243 |

== Competitive history ==
Competitive history of Maggie Nichols at the level 10 and junior elite level
| Year | Event | Team | AA | VT | UB | BB | FX |
|---|---|---|---|---|---|---|---|
| 2011 | Nastia Liukin Cup | | 20 | | | | |
| 2011 | J.O. National Championships | | 2nd place, silver medalist(s) | 2nd place, silver medalist(s) | 1st place, gold medalist(s) | 1st place, gold medalist(s) | 3rd place, bronze medalist(s) |
| 2011 | Elite Qualifier | | 1st place, gold medalist(s) | 1st place, gold medalist(s) | 2nd place, silver medalist(s) | 3rd place, bronze medalist(s) | 5 |
| 2011 | American Classic | | 8 | 3rd place, bronze medalist(s) | | 2nd place, silver medalist(s) | |
| 2012 | American Classic | | 3rd place, bronze medalist(s) | 3rd place, bronze medalist(s) | 4 | 2nd place, silver medalist(s) | 7 |
| 2012 | U.S. Classic | | | 7 | | | |
| 2012 | U.S. Championships | | 11 | 10 | 14 | 10 | 11 |

Competitive history of Maggie Nichols at the senior elite level
| Year | Event | Team | AA | VT | UB | BB | FX |
|---|---|---|---|---|---|---|---|
| 2013 | City of Jesolo Trophy | 1st place, gold medalist(s) | 6 | | | | 2nd place, silver medalist(s) |
| 2013 | GER-ROU-USA Friendly | 1st place, gold medalist(s) | | | | | |
| 2013 | U.S. Classic | | 6 | | 11 | 8 | 5 |
| 2013 | U.S. Championships | | 5 | | 6 | 5 | 9 |
| 2014 | City of Jesolo Trophy | 1st place, gold medalist(s) | 3rd place, bronze medalist(s) | | | | |
| 2014 | Tokyo World Cup | | 3rd place, bronze medalist(s) | | | | |
| 2014 | U.S. Classic | | 3rd place, bronze medalist(s) | | 5 | 7 | 3rd place, bronze medalist(s) |
| 2014 | U.S. Championships | | 3rd place, bronze medalist(s) | | 3rd place, bronze medalist(s) | 4 | 3rd place, bronze medalist(s) |
| 2014 | Pan American Championships | 1st place, gold medalist(s) | 3rd place, bronze medalist(s) | | | | |
2015
| 2015 | City of Jesolo Trophy | 1st place, gold medalist(s) | 7 | | | | |
| 2015 | U.S. Classic | | 3rd place, bronze medalist(s) | | 5 | 5 | 3rd place, bronze medalist(s) |
| 2015 | U.S. Championships | | 2nd place, silver medalist(s) | | 7 | 4 | 5 |
| 2015 | World Championships | 1st place, gold medalist(s) | | | | | 3rd place, bronze medalist(s) |
| 2016 | American Cup | | 2nd place, silver medalist(s) | | | | |
| 2016 | U.S. Championships | | | | 13 | 10 | |
| 2016 | U.S. Olympic Trials | | 6 | 5 | 9 | 8 | 4 |

Competitive history of Maggie Nichols at the NCAA level
| Year | Event | Team | AA | VT | UB | BB | FX |
|---|---|---|---|---|---|---|---|
| 2017 | Big-12 Championships | 1st place, gold medalist(s) | | 1st place, gold medalist(s) | 1st place, gold medalist(s) | 8 | |
| 2017 | NCAA Championships | 1st place, gold medalist(s) | 29 | 5 | 1st place, gold medalist(s) | | 10 |
| 2018 | Big-12 Championships | 1st place, gold medalist(s) | 1st place, gold medalist(s) | 3rd place, bronze medalist(s) | 2nd place, silver medalist(s) | 2nd place, silver medalist(s) | 1st place, gold medalist(s) |
| 2018 | NCAA Championships | 2nd place, silver medalist(s) | 1st place, gold medalist(s) | 6 | 1st place, gold medalist(s) | 2nd place, silver medalist(s) | 1st place, gold medalist(s) |
| 2019 | Big-12 Championships | 1st place, gold medalist(s) | | | 1st place, gold medalist(s) | 1st place, gold medalist(s) | |
| 2019 | NCAA Championships | 1st place, gold medalist(s) | 1st place, gold medalist(s) | 1st place, gold medalist(s) | 2nd place, silver medalist(s) | 6 | 7 |
| 2020 | Big-12 Championships | Canceled due to the COVID-19 pandemic in the USA | | | | | |
| 2020 | NCAA Championships | Canceled due to the COVID-19 pandemic in the USA | | | | | |

== Awards ==
| Year | Award | Result | Ref |
|---|---|---|---|
| 2017 | Honda Sports Award (gymnastics) | Nominated | |
| 2018 | Honda Sports Award (gymnastics) | Nominated | |
| 2018 | Arthur Ashe Courage Award | Won | |
| 2019 | NCAA Inspiration Award | Won | |
| 2019 | Honda Sports Award (gymnastics) | Won | |
| 2020 | Honda Sports Award (gymnastics) | Nominated | |
| 2020 | AAI Award | Won | |

== Bibliography ==
- Unstoppable!: My Journey from World Champion to Athlete A to 8-Time NCAA National Gymnastics Champion and Beyond Roaring Brook Press, 2024) ISBN 978-1250860224
