= 2017 NCAA women's gymnastics tournament =

Collegiate gymnastics competition

- Venue: Chaifetz Arena (semi-finals and final)
- Location: St. Louis, Missouri
- Teams: 36

Medalists
gold medal	Oklahoma
silver medal	LSU
bronze medal	Florida

The 2017 NCAA women's gymnastics tournament was the 35th NCAA women's gymnastics tournament, the annual women's gymnastics championship contested by the teams of the member associations of NCAA. The regionals were hosted on campuses on April 1, 2017, while the semi-finals and final were held at Chaifetz Arena in St. Louis, Missouri from April 14 to April 15, 2017.

== NCAA Championship (Super Six) ==
The Super Six finals were held on April 15. Oklahoma scored an NCAA championship record 198.3875 to win their second consecutive national title. The Sooners had the highest team scores on vault, uneven bars, and floor exercise. They were led by Maggie Nichols, who had the highest score of the day on vault and tied for the highest scores on balance beam, with a 10, and floor exercise.

=== Standings ===
1. Oklahoma - 198.3875

2. LSU - 197.7375

3. Florida - 197.7000

4. UCLA - 197.2625

5. Utah - 196.5875

6. Alabama - 196.0000

== Individual results ==
=== All-around ===
Rank	Gymnast	Vault (gymnastics)	Uneven bars	Balance beam	Floor (gymnastics)	Total
1st place, gold medalist(s)	Alex McMurtry (Florida)	9.9750	9.9500	9.9375	9.9500	39.8125
2nd place, silver medalist(s)	MyKayla Skinner (Utah)	9.9000	9.8375	9.9125	9.9625	39.6125
3rd place, bronze medalist(s)	Kiana Winston (Alabama)	9.8750	9.9000	9.8875	9.9375	39.6000
4	Sarah Finnegan (LSU)	9.7750	9.9500	9.9125	9.9500	39.5875
4	Myia Hambrick (LSU)	9.8625	9.8375	9.9375	9.9500	39.5875
6	Kyla Ross (UCLA)	9.8375	9.9500	9.9625	9.8250	39.5750
7	Madison Kocian (UCLA)	9.8750	9.8750	9.8625	9.9375	39.5500
8	Alicia Boren (Florida)	9.9000	9.8625	9.8875	9.8500	39.5000
9	Maddie Karr (Denver)	9.8750	9.8750	9.8375	9.8875	39.4750
10	Mollie Korth (Kentucky)	9.8875	9.9250	9.8000	9.8375	39.4500

=== Event champions ===
==== Vault ====
Rank	Gymnast	Total
1st place, gold medalist(s)	Kennedi Edney (LSU)	9.9875
2nd place, silver medalist(s)	Alex McMurtry (Florida)	9.9750
3rd place, bronze medalist(s)	Sydney Ewing (LSU)	9.9625
4	Sienna Crouse (Nebraska)	9.9125
5	Alicia Boren (Florida)	9.9000
5	Rachel Slocum (Florida)	9.9000
5	Ashleigh Gnat (LSU)	9.9000
5	Olivia Karas (Michigan)	9.9000
5	Ashley Lambert (Nebraska)	9.9000
5	Chayse Capps (Oklahoma)	9.9000
5	AJ Jackson (Oklahoma)	9.9000
5	Maggie Nichols (Oklahoma)	9.9000
5	MyKayla Skinner (Utah)	9.9000

==== Uneven bars ====
Rank	Gymnast	Total
1st place, gold medalist(s)	Katie Bailey (Alabama)	9.9500
1st place, gold medalist(s)	Alex McMurtry (Florida)	9.9500
1st place, gold medalist(s)	Sarah Finnegan (LSU)	9.9500
1st place, gold medalist(s)	Nicole Lehrmann (Oklahoma)	9.9500
1st place, gold medalist(s)	Maggie Nichols (Oklahoma)	9.9500
1st place, gold medalist(s)	Kyla Ross (UCLA)	9.9500
7	Lexie Priessman (LSU)	9.9250
7	Mollie Korth (Kentucky)	9.9250

==== Balance beam ====
Rank	Gymnast	Total
1st place, gold medalist(s)	Kyla Ross (UCLA)	9.9625
2nd place, silver medalist(s)	Chayse Capps (Oklahoma)	9.9500
3rd place, bronze medalist(s)	Alex McMurtry (Florida)	9.9375
3rd place, bronze medalist(s)	Myia Hambrick (LSU)	9.9375
3rd place, bronze medalist(s)	Ashleigh Gnat (LSU)	9.9375
6	Aja Sims (Alabama)	9.9250
6	Nicole Lehrmann (Oklahoma)	9.9250
8	Sarah Finnegan (LSU)	9.9125
8	Madeline Gardiner (Oregon St.)	9.9125
8	Katelyn Ohashi (UCLA)	9.9125
8	MyKayla Skinner (Utah)	9.9125

==== Floor exercise ====
Rank	Gymnast	Total
1st place, gold medalist(s)	Ashleigh Gnat (LSU)	9.9625
1st place, gold medalist(s)	MyKayla Skinner (Utah)	9.9625
3rd place, bronze medalist(s)	Alex McMurtry (Florida)	9.9500
3rd place, bronze medalist(s)	Myia Hambrick (LSU)	9.9500
3rd place, bronze medalist(s)	Sarah Finnegan (LSU)	9.9500
3rd place, bronze medalist(s)	McKenna Kelley (LSU)	9.9500
7	Kiana Winston (Alabama)	9.9375
7	Kennedy Baker (Florida)	9.9375
7	Madison Kocian (UCLA)	9.9375
