= McKenna Kelley =

American artistic gymnast

- Full name: McKenna Lane Kelley
- Born: April 15, 1997 (age 29) Houston, Texas, United States

Gymnastics career
- Discipline: Women's artistic gymnastics
- Country represented: United States
- College team: LSU Tigers (Class of 2019)
- Club: Stars Gymnastics Training Center
- Head coaches: Dan Baker, Ashly Baker
- Retired: April 25, 2019
Medal record
Representing Stars TX
Nastia Liukin Cup
Gold medal – first place	2014 Greensboro	All Around
Representing LSU Tigers
NCAA Championships
Silver medal – second place	2019 Fort Worth	Team
Silver medal – second place	2017 St. Louis	Team
Silver medal – second place	2016 Fort Worth	Team

McKenna Lane Kelley (born April 15, 1997) is a retired American artistic gymnast.

== Early life ==
McKenna Kelley was born on April 15, 1997, in Houston, Texas. She is the second of four children of Olympic gold medal gymnast Mary Lou Retton and former Texas Longhorns quarterback Shannon Kelley. Her older sister Shayla competed for the Baylor University Acrobatics and Tumbling team, her younger sister Skyla is a competitive cheerleader, and her younger sister Emma has competed with the University of Arkansas gymnastics team since 2020.

== Career ==
=== Level 10 ===
Kelley placed 5th in the all-around at the 2013 J.O. Nationals in the Junior D age division. In 2014, she was the Nastia Liukin Cup co-champion with Mackenzie Brannan.

Kelley briefly trained as an elite gymnast and was invited to a few U.S. National team camps in 2015. She attended the USA Gymnastics training camp for the selection of the 2015 Pan American Games but did not make the team.

=== College ===
==== 2016 ====
Kelley joined the LSU Tigers gymnastics team in the 2016 season. She specialized in the floor exercise, competing in 13 of 14 meets. At the SEC Championship, she posted a season-high score of 9.925 to help the Tigers win the team title; she also earned SEC All-Freshman honors.

At the Super Six team finals of the 2016 NCAA Gymnastics Championship, she contributed a score of 9.9 to the Tigers' second-place finish.

==== 2017 ====
Kelley competed on floor exercise in all but two meets of the 2017 season, and also competed once on vault for a score of 9.825. She earned a career-high floor exercise score of 9.975 against George Washington and Iowa. She posted a score of 9.95 on floor exercise at the SEC Championships, earning the event title and contributing to the Tigers' team title.

At the Super Six team finals of the 2017 NCAA Gymnastics Championship, she contributed a score of 9.9 on the floor exercise to help the Tigers earn another second-place finish. She earned first team All-America honors on the floor exercise.

==== 2018 ====
Kelley did not compete in the 2018 season due to an Achilles tendon injury she suffered during a preseason training session.

==== 2019 ====
In addition to floor exercise, Kelley competed regularly on vault and three times on balance beam during the 2019 season. She posted season-high scores of 9.925 on the vault against Missouri and 9.85 on the balance beam at Kentucky. On March 8, she earned her first career perfect 10 on the floor exercise against Oregon State, earning SEC Specialist of the Week honors. At the SEC Championships, she posted scores of 9.9 on the vault and the floor exercise to help the Tigers to another team title.

In the team finals of the 2019 NCAA Gymnastics Championship, Kelley contributed scores of 9.8875 on the vault and 9.95 on the floor exercise to help earn another second-place team finish for the Tigers. She earned second team All-America honors on the floor exercise.

Having missed an entire season due to injury, Kelley was eligible to take a redshirt year but instead opted to retire and end her career after her senior season.

== Personal life ==
McKenna lives in Cedar Park, Texas, United States. On September 28, 2024 she married her boyfriend Braden Doughty.
