= Sydney Ewing =

American artistic gymnast

- Full name: Sydney Ewing
- Born: February 16, 1995 (age 31) Louisiana, United States
- Height: 152.4 cm (5 ft 0 in)

Gymnastics career
- Discipline: Women's artistic gymnastics
- College team: LSU Lady Tigers (2014–17)
- Club: Acadiana
- Head coach: D-D Breaux
- Assistant coach: Jay Clark
- Former coach: Donna Ewing
- Retired: June 7, 2017

Sydney Ewing (born February 16, 1995 in Louisiana) is a retired American collegiate artistic gymnast. She competed in the NCAA for Louisiana State University and their gymnastics team.

== Early life ==
Sydney Ewing was born on February 16, 1995, to parents, Ned and Donna Ewing. She has an older brother, Travis, who was a contestant on the eighth season of The Voice. Her mother, Donna, is a gymnastics coach and was the head personal coach to Sydney throughout her club competitive career. In 2013, Ewing graduated from Lafayette High School.

== Gymnastics career ==
Ewing trained at Acadiana Gymnastics Training Center in Lafayette, Louisiana throughout her entire club competitive career.

=== 2009-13: Club competitive career ===
Sydney moved up to Level 10 for the 2009 season; at the age of fourteen At Regionals, she placed eighteenth in the all-around. In 2010, she was third at States and was tenth at Regionals. At her first J.O. NIT, in Dallas, Texas, Ewing placed tenth in the all-around. Ewing was Louisiana State champion in 2011. and was fifth in the all-around and second on beam at Regionals. At Nationals, she was thirty-fifth in the all-around. Ewing defended her State title during the 2012 season. Later, Sydney finished ninth in the all-around at Regionals; advancing to JO NIT. On June 29, 2012, Ewing committed to Louisiana State University and the LSU Lady Tigers gymnastics team. At the NIT, Ewing was fifth in the all-around. Her final season was in 2013; finishing second at Regionals. At Nationals, she finished thirty-first in the all-around.

=== 2014–2017: College gymnastics career ===
Throughout the recruiting process, Ewing was offered scholarships to the Georgia Gym Dogs, New Hampshire Wildcats and Southern Utah Thunderbirds teams. However, she decided to walk-on to LSU. She retired from gymnastics on June 7, 2017.
