= Martin J. Broussard Center for Athletic Training =

Building in Louisiana

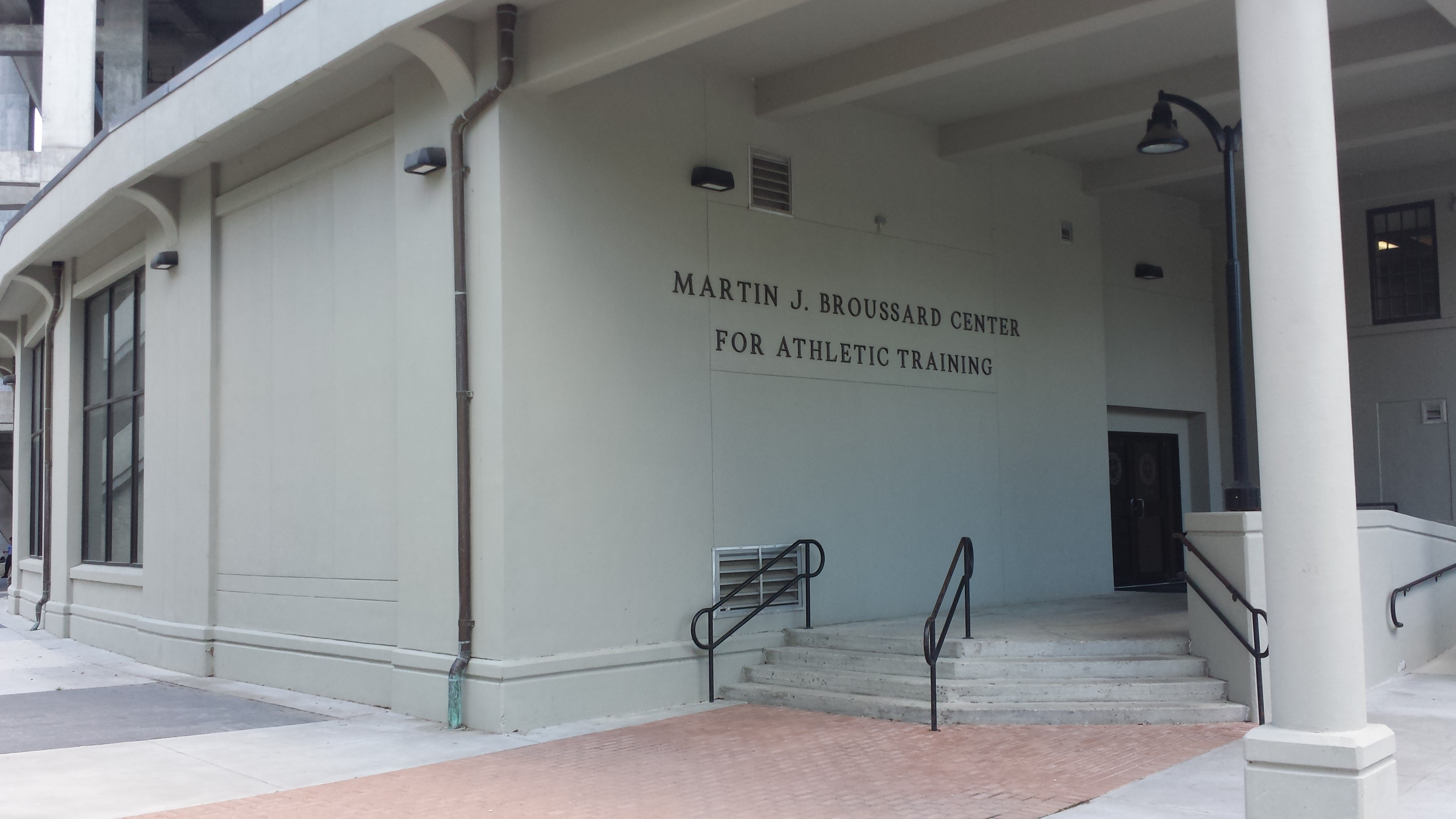
- Interactive map of Martin J. Broussard Center for Athletic Training
- Location: North Stadium Drive; Baton Rouge, Louisiana 70803; USA
- Coordinates: 30°24′43″N 91°11′8″W
- Owner: Louisiana State University
- Operator: LSU Athletics Department

Construction
- Opened: 1998

The Martin J. Broussard Center for Athletic Training is the athletic training and rehabilitation center for LSU athletics at Louisiana State University. The two-story, 22,000 square foot facility, built in 1998, serves as the main athletic training facility for all treatments and rehabilitations. The facility is located adjacent to Tiger Stadium and is staffed by full-time certified staff athletic trainers, certified graduate assistants and athletic training students.

== First floor ==
The first floor contains treatment tables, taping stations and a 1,600 sq. foot rehabilitation area that offers rehabilitation equipment for the athletes. The area also includes computers/work stations that track an athlete's injury and generates exercise and rehabilitation protocols.

=== Rehabilitation area ===
The rehabilitation area is used for both short and long-term therapy. The equipment includes cardiovascular equipment, equipment to build, rebuild and maintain strength along with rehabilitating joints and diagnostic tools to determine the strengths and deficits of the athletes.

=== Pool rehabilitation area ===
The 2,400-square-foot pool rehabilitation area includes jacuzzi-style walk-in whirlpools, a lap pool that varies in depth and a pool for cardiovascular training. Another area also has a walk-in cold jacuzzi style tub.

== Second floor ==
The second level offers physician offices, an x-ray room with a casting room, an echocardiogram (EKG) station, a full-service dental clinic, an optometry center and pharmacy.

This level also houses an athletic training student lounge and a conference room and meeting room for athletic training students. The John Weston Hawie Family Conference Room is used for meetings, student in-services and interviews and the Dr. Joe Serio Library located in the conference room stores books and periodicals pertaining to athletic training. The second floor also contains a storage room that contains all of the medical supplies that the athletic training department would use including splints, braces and first aid supplies.

== Satellite athletic training facilities ==
- Alex Box Stadium, Skip Bertman Field athletic training facility
- Carl Maddox Field House athletic training facility
- LSU Football Operations Center athletic training facility
- LSU Gymnastics Training Facility athletic training facility
- LSU Soccer Complex athletic training facility
- LSU Tennis Complex athletic training facility
- Pete Maravich Assembly Center men's basketball athletic training facility
- Tiger Park athletic training facility

== Gallery ==
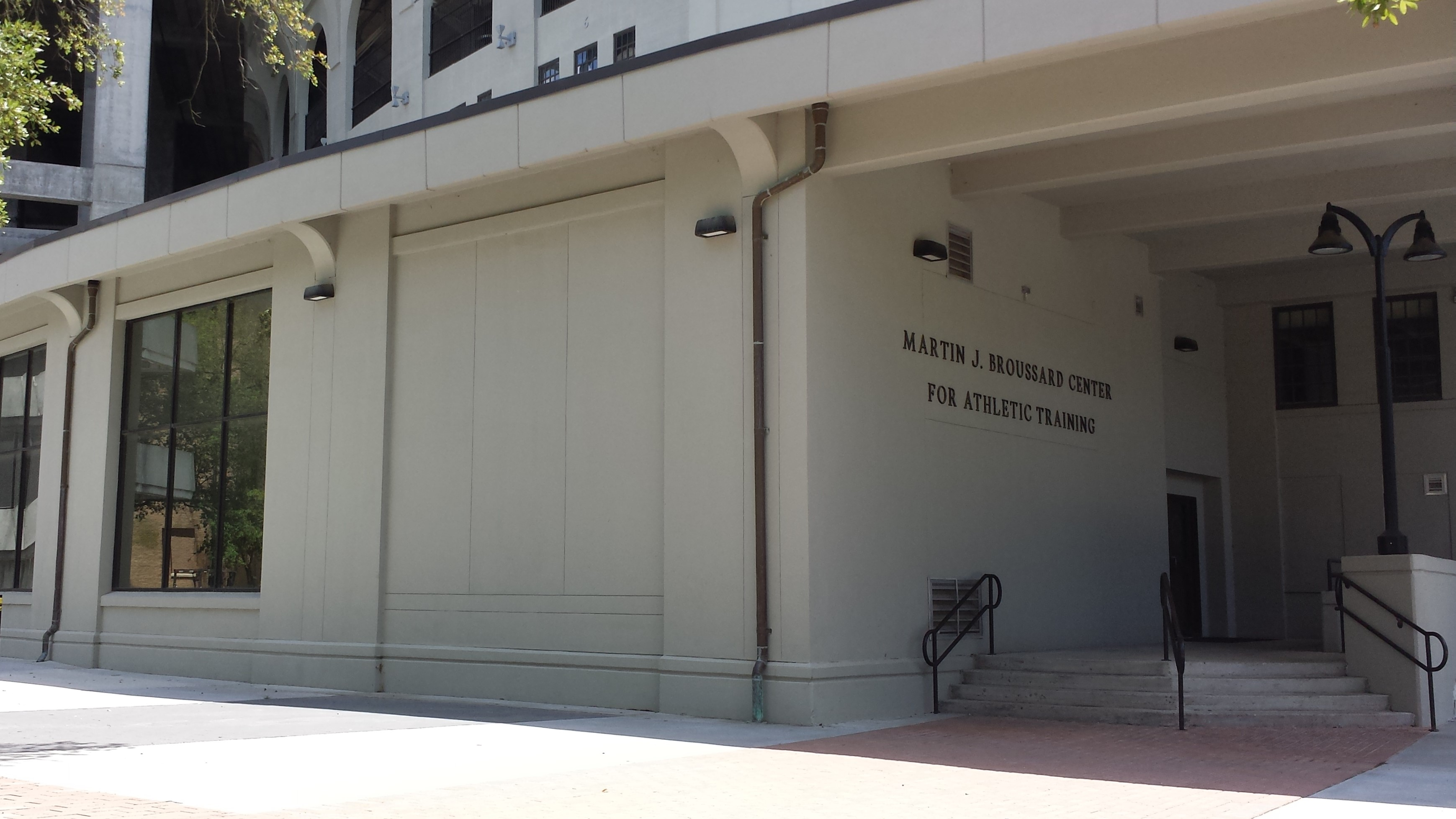
Martin J. Broussard Center for Athletic Training-Main Entrance

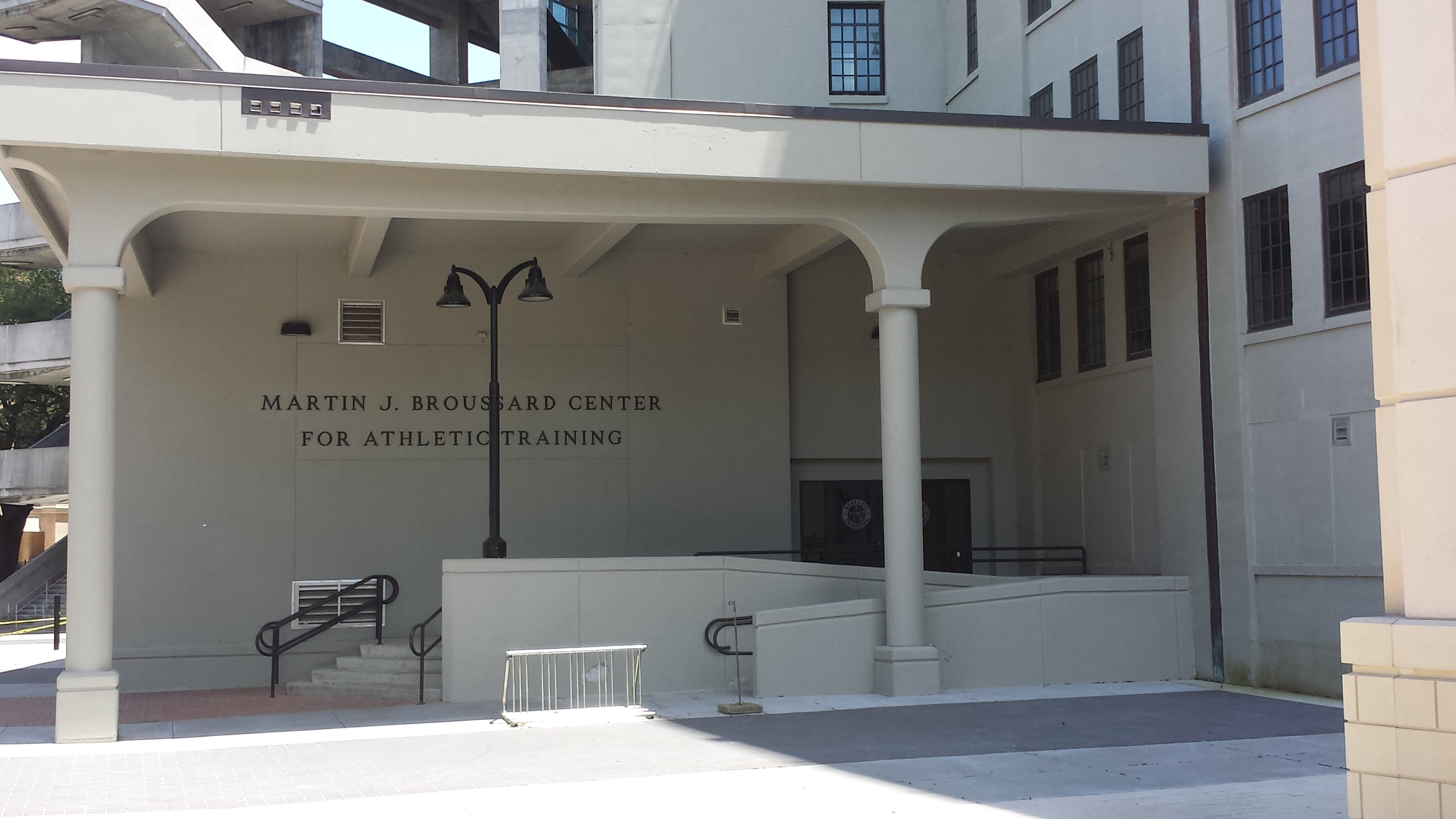
Martin J. Broussard Center for Athletic Training facility
