= Julianna Cannamela =

American gymnast (born 1997)

- Full name: Julianna Marie Cannamela
- Born: June 26, 1997 (age 29) Pineville, North Carolina, U.S.
- Height: 154.94 cm (5 ft 1 in)

Gymnastics career
- Discipline: Women's artistic gymnastics
- College team: LSU Tigers (2015–19)
- Club: Southeastern
- Head coach: D-D Breaux
- Assistant coach: Jay Clark
- Former coaches: Ludmilla Shobe, Galina Meliakina
- Last updated on: August 21, 2015.

Julianna Marie Cannamela (born June 26, 1997) is an All American collegiate artistic gymnast. She currently represents the LSU Tigers women's gymnastics; competing in the Southeastern Conference.

== Early life ==
Julianna Marie Cannamela was born on June 26, 1997, in Pineville, North Carolina, to parents, John and Dawn Cannamela. She has three brothers, John Jr., Jacob and Joseph. In the spring of 2015, Cannamela graduated from Parkwood High School.

== Gymnastics career ==
In 2001, at the age of four, Cannamela enrolled in recreational gymnastics classes at Southeastern Gymnastics in Weddington, North Carolina. Julianna remained at the club for her entire club competitive career.

=== 2011–15: Club competitive career ===
Cannamela moved up to Level 10 for the 2011 season; at the age of thirteen. She was second at Regionals and twenty-first at Nationals. A year later, during the 2012 season, Cannamela was fifth at Regionals. Later, she finished third in the all-around at her second J.O. Nationals. In addition, she won a silver medal on bars. On August 5, 2012, it was announced that she had verbally committed to Louisiana State University and their gymnastics program. Julianna competed as a Level 10 for the 2013 season; her third year. At Regionals, Cannamela finished second in the all-around and was the bars champion. At Nationals, she was fourteenth. Cannamela was a fourth year Level 10 for the 2014 season. She was third at Regionals and thirty-first at Nationals; tied with Aya Mahgoub and Kristen Quaglia. On November 12, 2014, Cannamela signed the National Letter of Intent to the LSU Lady Tigers team. Her final season as a Level 10 gymnast was for the 2015 season; where she placed second at Regionals and twenty-third at Nationals.

=== 2016–present: College gymnastics career ===
==== 2016: Freshman season ====
Cannamela signed to the LSU Tigers women's gymnastics program on November 12, 2014, for the 2015-16 season. In a press release, Head coach D-D Breaux touted Cannamela as an "a very balanced all-arounder".
