= Ashleigh Gnat =

American artistic gymnast

- Full name: Ashleigh Marie Gnat
- Nickname: Bugs
- Born: November 13, 1994 (age 31) Altamonte, Florida
- Height: 152 cm (5 ft 0 in)

Gymnastics career
- Discipline: Women's artistic gymnastics
- College team: LSU Tigers
- Club: ACE Gymnastics
- Head coach: D-D Breaux
- Assistant coach: Jay Clark
- Former coaches: Ray Gnat, Beth Martin, Jon Lee
- Choreographer: Ashleigh Clare-Kearney
Medal record
Representing Louisiana State Tigers
NCAA Championships
Gold medal – first place	2017 St. Louis	Floor exercise
Silver medal – second place	2016 Fort Worth	Team
Silver medal – second place	2017 St. Louis	Team
Bronze medal – third place	2014 Birmingham	Team
Bronze medal – third place	2016 Fort Worth	Vault
Bronze medal – third place	2017 St. Louis	Balance beam

Current position
- Title: Assistant Coach
- Team: LSU Tigers
- Conference: SEC

Coaching career (HC unless noted)
- 2021–2025: LSU Tigers (Assistant coach)

Ashleigh Marie Gnat (born November 13, 1994, in Altamonte Springs, Florida) is a former American collegiate gymnast and coach. She competed for the Louisiana State University gymnastics team from 2014 to 2017. Gnat coached as an assistant coach at Penn State in 2020. She is now an assistant coach at her alma mater, Louisiana State University.

== Early life ==
Gnat was born on November 13, 1994, in Altamonte Springs to parents Ray and Joan (née Moore) Gnat. Her father was an All-American gymnast for the now-defunct LSU men's gymnastics program, and her mother was a 1972 Olympian. She has three older siblings from her mother's first marriage to Bob Rice, a former Temple gymnast—two brothers, Sean and Stephen, a film editor at Full Sail University, and a sister, Jeana Rice-Helms (b. November 22, 1981), who competed for the University of Alabama and was the 2004 NCAA champion in women's gymnastics.

She started gymnastics in 1997, shortly after her parents opened ACE Gymnastics, a facility in Longwood, Florida.

== Club career ==
=== 2007–09 ===
Gnat reached Level 9 in USA Gymnastics' Junior Olympic program at the age of 11 and finished eighth at the 2007 Eastern Championships, placing higher than the eventual 2012 Olympic all-around champion, Gabby Douglas.

She moved up to Level 10 for the 2008 season, when she was 13. She placed second in the all-around at Regionals, in addition to taking the vault and bars titles, and advanced to her first J.O. Nationals in Orlando, where she finished nineteenth in the all-around.

A year later, Gnat was third in the all-around at States and won vault and floor. At Regionals, she took home a gold medal on floor and silver medals in the all-around, on vault and on bars. In mid-May, she participated in her second J.O. Nationals, finishing ninth in the all-around and tying for third on floor with three other gymnasts.

=== 2010–13 ===
Gnat qualified to the inaugural Nastia Liukin Cup in 2010 and finished 21st in the all-around. Later in the year, she claimed both the State and Regional all-around titles, before tying for seventh at her third J.O. Nationals. In 2011, she defended her Regional title in the all-around, but a disappointing performance at Nationals left her in fifteenth place.

She qualified to her second Nastia Liukin Cup in 2012 and placed 22nd in the all-around. Later, she was the Florida champion in the all-around and on three events. She tied for second in the all-around at Regionals and placed fifth at Nationals in May.

Gnat's final club competitive season, in 2013, turned out to be her best. At the Lady Luck Invitational in Las Vegas, she scored a perfect 10 on vault, which secured her the ranking of No. 1 in the nation on that event. She also earned her third Nastia Liukin Cup berth, a rare feat. At the Cup, she tied for eighth in the all-around with 2012 winner Charity Jones. She was the state champion in the all-around and on three events. At Regionals, she swept all five titles, logging her highest ever all-around score of 39.000 and finishing the season with the fifth highest all-around ranking in the nation.

At her fifth and final J.O. Nationals, Gnat was second in the all-around. In addition, she was the vault champion and joint floor champion with Kullen Hlawek. As a result, she was named to the USA Gymnastics J.O. national team.

== College career ==
On January 9, 2012, Gnat verbally committed to the Louisiana State University women's gymnastics team. She signed the National Letter of Intent on November 16, 2012.

During her freshman season in 2014, she saw action on vault, beam and floor. At the SEC Championships, she contributed on vault and beam.

=== Career Perfect 10.0 ===
Season	Date	Event	Meet
2016	January 22, 2016	Vault	LSU vs. Kentucky
2016	January 30, 2016	Vault	Metroplex Challenge
2016	February 19, 2016	Floor Exercise	LSU vs. Auburn
2016	March 4, 2016	Floor Exercise	LSU vs. Alabama
2016	March 12, 2016	Floor Exercise	LSU @ Texas Woman's
2016	March 19, 2016	Floor Exercise	SEC Championship
2017	January 13, 2017	Vault	LSU @ Alabama
2017	March 5, 2017	Vault	LSU vs. Florida
2017	March 18, 2017	Vault	SEC Championship

== Personal life ==
Gnat graduated from Lake Mary High School in 2013. She studied sports administration at Louisiana State University.
