= 2019 NCAA Division I women's gymnastics season =

- Sport: Artistic gymnastics
- Duration: January – April 20, 2019
- Teams: 62

NCAA Women's Gymnastics Championships

Seasons
- 2018 2020

The 2019 NCAA Division I women's gymnastics season will begin in January 2019 and run until the 2019 NCAA Women's Gymnastics Championship during April 19–20, 2019 at the Fort Worth Convention Center in Fort Worth, Texas. The season encompasses the 62 NCAA Division I women's gymnastics team across the United States.

== Teams ==
=== Big 12 ===
Team	School	Arena	City	Head coach	Season	Notes
Denver Pioneers	University of Denver	Hamilton Gymnasium	Denver, CO	Melissa Kutcher-Rinehart	21st	2019 season
Iowa State Cyclones	Iowa State University	Hilton Coliseum	Ames, IA	Jay Ronayne	13th	2019 season
Oklahoma Sooners	University of Oklahoma(OU)	Lloyd Noble Center	Norman, OK	K. J. Kindler	13th	2019 season
West Virginia Mountaineers	West Virginia Mountaineers	WVU Coliseum	Morgantown, WV	Jason Butts	7th	2019 season

=== Big Ten ===
Team	School	Arena	City	Head coach	Season	Notes
Illinois Fighting Illini	University of Illinois	Huff Hall	Champaign, IL	Nadalie Walsh	2nd	2019 season
Iowa Hawkeyes	University of Iowa	Carver-Hawkeye Arena	Iowa City, IA	Larissa Libby	15th	2019 season
Maryland Terrapins	University of Maryland-College Park	Xfinity Center	College Park, MD	Brett Nelligan	10th	2019 season
Michigan Wolverines	University of Michigan	Crisler Center	Ann Arbor, MI	Bev Plocki	29th	2019 season
Michigan State Spartans	Michigan State University	Jenison Fieldhouse	Lansing, MI	Mike Rowe	2nd	2019 season
Minnesota Golden Gophers	University of Minnesota	Maturi Pavilion	Minneapolis, MN	Jenny Hansen	5th	2019 season
Nebraska Cornhuskers	University of Nebraska–Lincoln	Bob Devaney Sports Center	Lincoln, NE	Dan Kendig	24th	2019 season
Ohio State Buckeyes	Ohio State University	St. John Arena	Columbus, OH	Meredith Paulicivic	2nd	2019 season
Penn State Nittany Lions	Pennsylvania State University	Rec Hall	University Park, PA	Sarah Brown	2nd	2019 season
Rutgers Scarlet Knights	Rutgers University-New Brunswick	Rutgers Athletic Center	New Brunswick, NJ	Umme Salim-Beasley	1st	2019 season

=== EAGL ===
Team	School	Arena	City	Head coach	Season	Notes
George Washington Colonials	George Washington University	Charles E. Smith Center	Washington, D.C.	Margie Foster-Cunningham	34th	2019 season
New Hampshire Wildcats	University of New Hampshire	Lundholm Gym	Durham, NH	Gail Goodspead	40th	2019 season
North Carolina Tar Heels	University of North Carolina-Chapel Hill	Carmichael Arena	Chapel Hill, NC	Derek Galvin	37th	2019 season
North Carolina State Wolfpack	North Carolina State University	Reynolds Coliseum	Raleigh, NC	Kim Landrus	2nd	2019 season
Pittsburgh Panthers	University of Pittsburgh	Fitzgerald Field House	Pittsburgh, PA	Samantha Snider	2nd	2019 season
Towson Tigers	Towson University	SECU Arena	Towson, MD	Vicki May	9th	2019 season

=== ECAC ===
Team	School	Arena	City	Head coach	Season	Notes
Brown Bears	Brown University	Pizzitola Sports Center	Providence, RI	Sara Carver-Milne	17th	2019 season
Cornell Big Red	Cornell University	Teagle Gymnasium	Ithaca, NY	Paul Beckwith	24th	2019 season
Penn Quakers	University of Pennsylvania	Palestra	Philadelphia, PA	John Ceralde	13th	2019 season
Temple Owls	Temple University	McGonigle Hall	Philadelphia, PA	Josh Nilson	1st	2019 season
William & Mary Tribe	College of William & Mary	Kaplan Arena	Williamsburg, VA	Mary Lewis	25th	2019 season
Yale Bulldogs	Yale University	John J. Lee Amphitheater	New Haven, CT	Barbara Tonry	46th	2019 season

=== MAC ===
Team	School	Arena	City	Head coach	Season	Notes
Ball State Cardinals	Ball State University	Worthen Arena	Muncie, IN	Joanna Saleem	6th	2019 season
Bowling Green State Falcons	Bowling Green State University	Anderson Arena	Bowling Green, OH	Kerrie Turner	12th	2019 season
Central Michigan Chippewas	Central Michigan University	McGuirk Arena	Mount Pleasant, MI	Jerry Reighard	35th	2019 season
Eastern Michigan Eagles	Eastern Michigan University	Convocation Center	Ypsilanti, MI	Katie Minasola	2nd	2019 season
Kent State Golden Flashes	Kent State University	MAC Center	Kent, OH	Brice Biggin	28th	2019 season
Northern Illinois Huskies	Northern Illinois University	Convocation Center	DeKalb, IL	Sam Morreale	8th	2019 season
Western Michigan Broncos	Western Michigan University	University Arena	Kalamazoo, MI	Penny Jernigan	6th	2019 season

=== MPSF ===
Team	School	Arena	City	Head coach	Season	Notes
Air Force Falcons	United States Air Force Academy	Cadet West Gym	Colorado Springs, CO	Doug Day	13th	2019 season
Alaska Anchorage Seawolves	University of Alaska at Anchorage	Alaska Airlines Center	Anchorage, AK	Tanya Ho	2nd	2019 season
Sacramento State Hornets	California State University, Sacramento	The Hornets Nest	Sacramento, CA	Randy Solorio	3rd	2019 season
San Jose State Spartans	San Jose State University	Event Center Arena	San Jose, CA	Joanne Bowers	1st	2019 season
UC Davis Aggies	University of California, Davis	The Pavilion	Davis, CA	John Lavallee	13th	2019 season

=== MRGC ===
Team	School	Arena	City	Head coach	Season	Notes
Boise State Broncos	Boise State University	Taco Bell Arena	Boise, ID	Tina Bird and Neil Resnick	12th	2019 season
BYU Cougars	Brigham Young University	Smith Fieldhouse	Provo, UT	Guard Young	4th	2019 season
Southern Utah Thunderbirds	Southern Utah University	America First Events Center	Cedar City, UT	Scott Bauman	28th	2019 season
Utah State Aggies	Utah State University	Smith Spectrum	Logan, UT	Amy Smith	2nd	2019 season

=== Pac-12 ===
Team	School	Arena	City	Head coach	Season	Notes
Arizona Wildcats	University of Arizona	McKale Center	Tucson, AZ	John Court	2nd	2019 season
Arizona State Sun Devils	Arizona State University	Wells Fargo Arena	Tempe, AZ	Jay Santos	3rd	2019 season
California Golden Bears	University of California, Berkeley	Haas Pavilion	Berkeley, CA	Justin Howell	7th	2019 season
Oregon State Beavers	Oregon State University	Gill Coliseum	Corvallis, OR	Tanya Chaplin	22nd	2019 season
Stanford Cardinal	Stanford Cardinal	Maples Pavilion	Stanford, CA	Tabitha Yim	2nd	2019 season
UCLA Bruins	University of California, Los Angeles	Pauley Pavilion	Los Angeles, CA	Chris Waller	28th	2019 season
Utah Red Rocks	University of Utah	Jon M. Huntsman Center	Salt Lake City, UT	Megan Marsden and Tom Farden	4th	2019 season
Washington Huskies	University of Washington	American Airlines Center	Seattle, WA	Elise Ray	3rd	2019 season

=== SEC ===
Team	School	Arena	City	Head coach	Season	Notes
Alabama Crimson Tide	University of Alabama	Coleman Coliseum	Tuscaloosa, AL	Dana Duckworth	5th	2019 season
Arkansas Razorbacks	University of Arkansas	Barnhill Arena	Fayetteville, AR	Jordyn Weiber	1st	2019 season
Auburn Tigers	Auburn University	Auburn Arena	Auburn, AL	Jeff Graba	9th	2019 season
Florida Gators	University of Florida	O'Connell Center	Gainesville, FL	Jenny Rowland	4th	2019 season
Georgia Bulldogs	University of Georgia	Stegeman Coliseum	Athens, GA	Courtney Kupets Carter	2nd	2019 season
Kentucky Wildcats	University of Kentucky	Memorial Coliseum	Lexington, KY	Tim Garrison	8th	2019 season
LSU Lady Tigers	Louisiana State University	Pete Maravich Assembly Center	Baton Rouge, LA	D-D Breaux	42nd	2019 season
Missouri Tigers	University of Missouri	Hearnes Center	Columbia, MO	Shannon Welker	6th	2019 season
