= Jackie Walker (gymnastics) =

Biographical details
- Education: Miami University

Coaching career (HC unless noted)
- 1974–1977: LSU
- 1978–1982: Stanford
- 1984–2001: San Jose State

Head coaching record
- Overall: 192–186–1

Jackie Walker was the head coach of the LSU Tigers women's gymnastics team, Stanford Cardinal gymnastics team and San Jose State Spartans gymnastics team.

== Coaching career ==
Walker had an overall record of 192–186–1 (.455) from 1971 until 2001. At LSU from 1974 to 1977, Walker had a 21–1–0 record. She was the first head coach in LSU women's gymnastics history. Her team's won 3 AIAW Regional Championships. The team finished 23rd at the AIAW National Championships in 1976 and 14th in 1977. In 1977, Walker coached Jeanie Beadle who became the AIAW Balance Beam National Champion.

In 1978, Walker moved to Stanford University to start the Cardinal gymnastics program. She was head coach from 1978 to 1982. Her record at Stanford was 44–23–0 Starting with the 1984–85 season, Walker became head coach at San Jose State. She spent 17 seasons at San Jose State and had a record of 127–162–1 before retiring from coaching collegiate gymnastics in 2001.

== Gymnast career ==
Walker was a collegiate gymnast at Miami University.

== Personal life ==
Walker is married to her husband, Jerry and has a daughter named Kelly.
