= LSU Gymnastics Training Facility =

Gymnastics facility in Baton Rouge, Louisiana

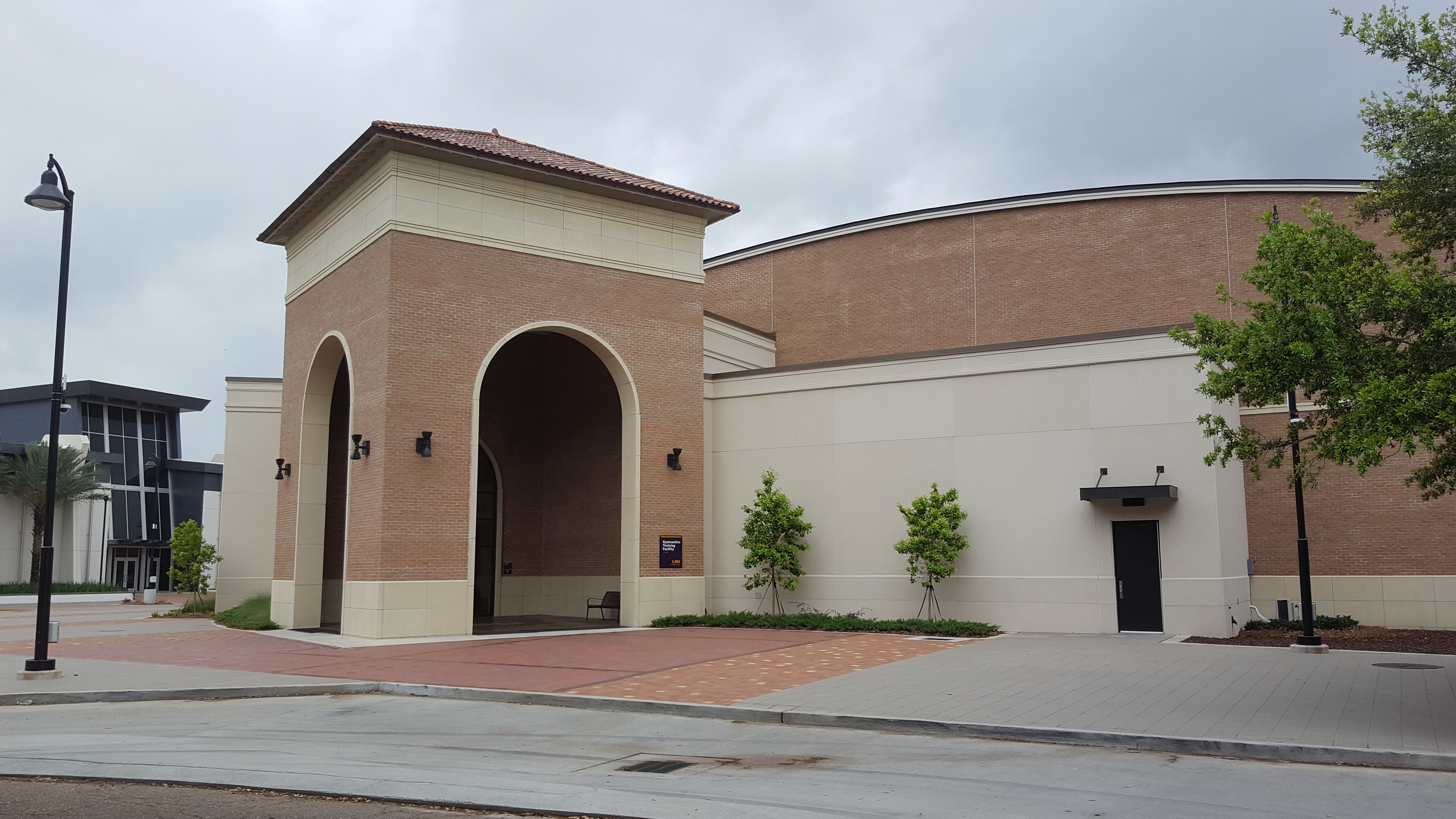
- Interactive map of LSU Gymnastics Training Facility
- Location: Baton Rouge, Louisiana 70803; United States
- Coordinates: 30°41′55″N 91°18′44″W
- Owner: Louisiana State University
- Operator: LSU Athletics Department

Construction
- Groundbreaking: 2014
- Opened: 2016
- Architect: GraceHebert Architects

Tenant
- LSU Tigers women's gymnastics (NCAA)

The LSU Gymnastics Training Facility is a gymnastics facility located on the campus of Louisiana State University in Baton Rouge, LA. The facility, opened in 2016, serves as the stand-alone practice facility for the LSU Tigers women's gymnastics team.

The training facility is a 38,000-square-foot facility with approximately 18,000 square feet of practice space in the gym area. The practice area features four competition-style beams, three vault runways with various surfaces for landings, four sets of uneven bars and a floor exercise area. The facility also includes the team locker room, coaches locker rooms, training room, cardio area, dance studio, team squad room, a video review room with theater seating that is also the team meeting room. It also includes an equipment storage area, a multi-purpose room that hosts team functions and a rooftop terrace.

The facility won multiple awards for interior design when it opened in 2016. It was awarded the 2016 Award of Recognition International Interior Design Association and 2016 Design Excellence Silver Award American Society of Interior Designers.

== Gallery ==
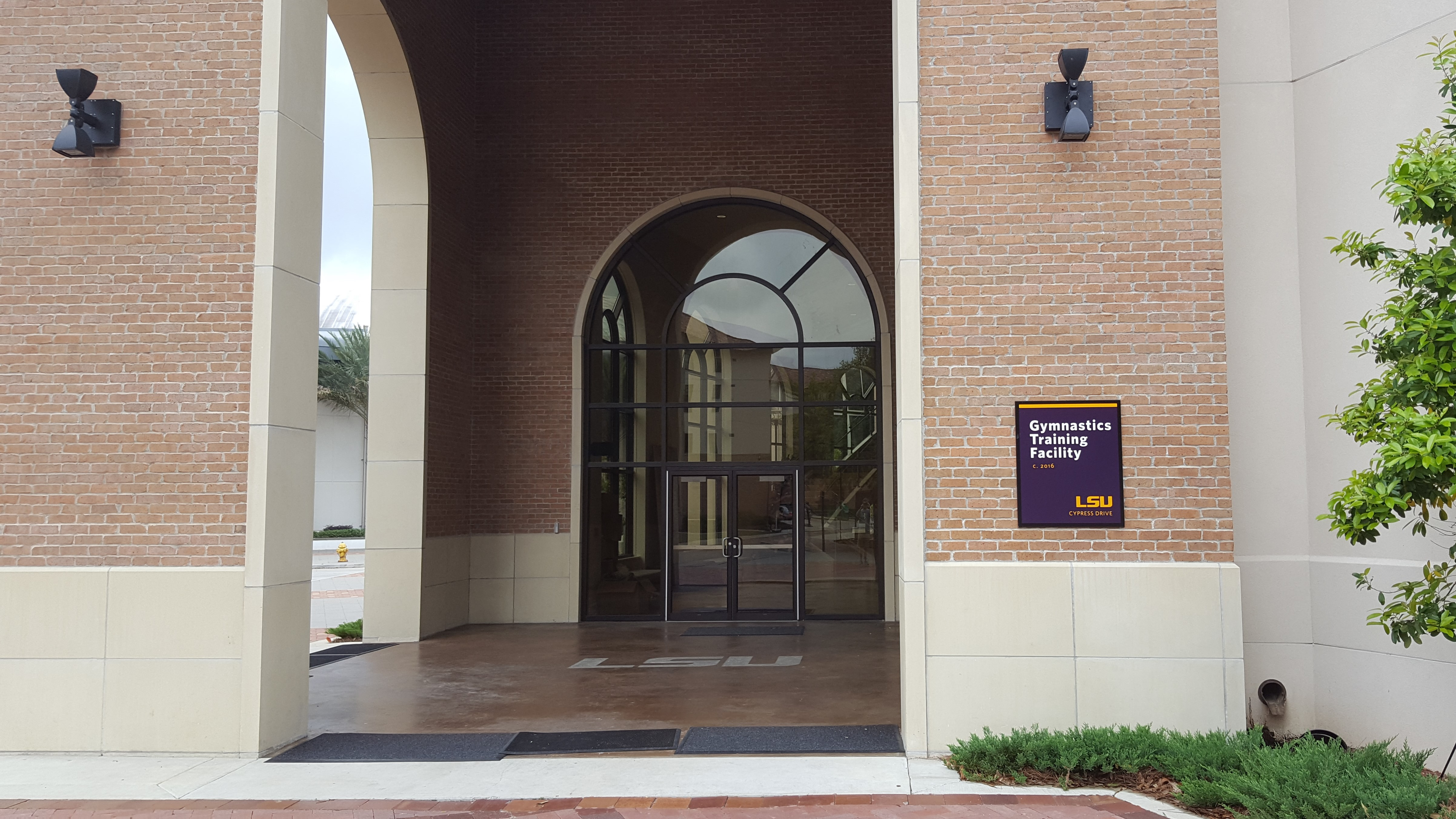
LSU Gymnastics Training Facility main entrance

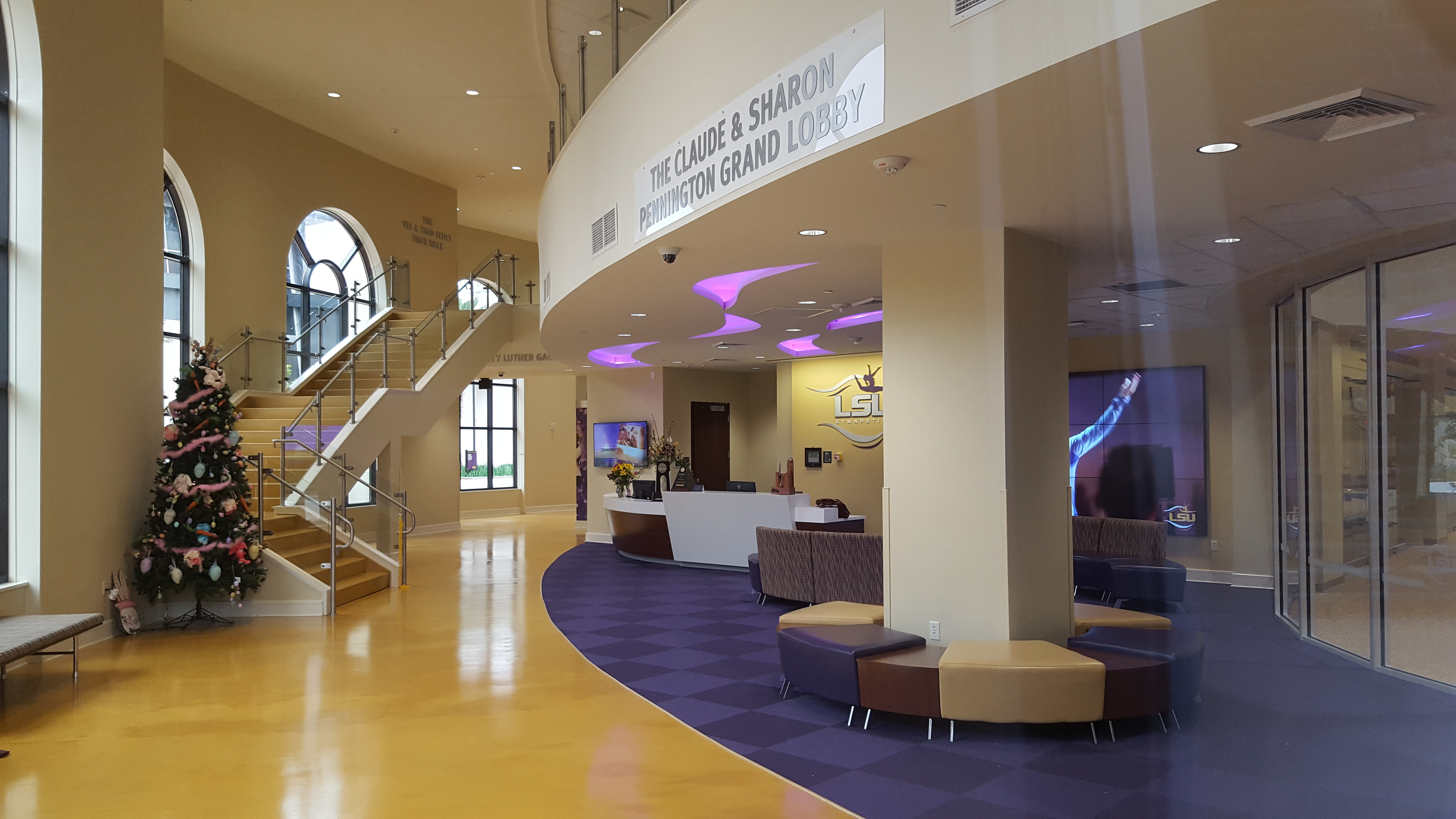
LSU Gymnastics Training Facility lobby

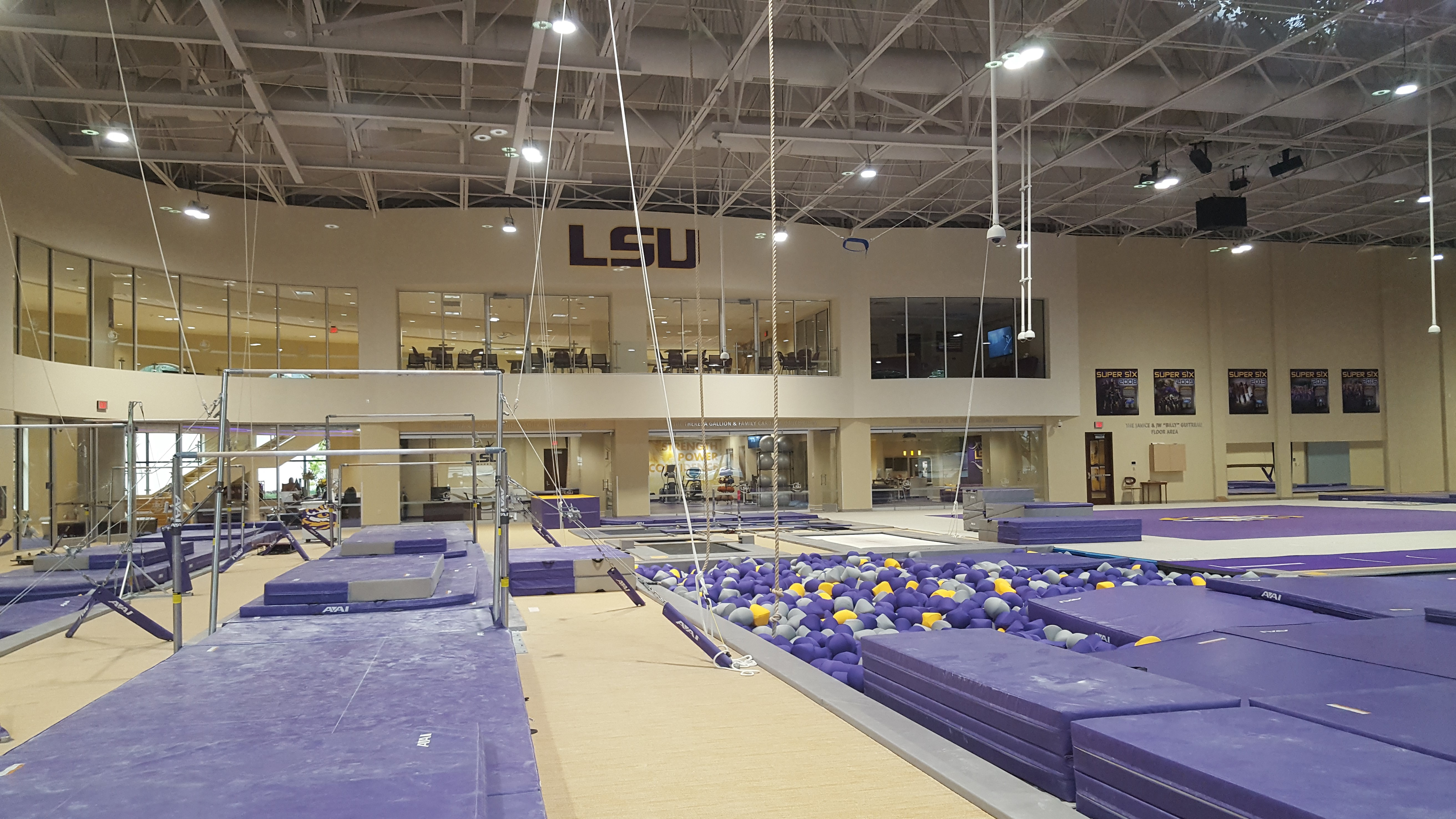
LSU Gymnastics Training Facility gym area

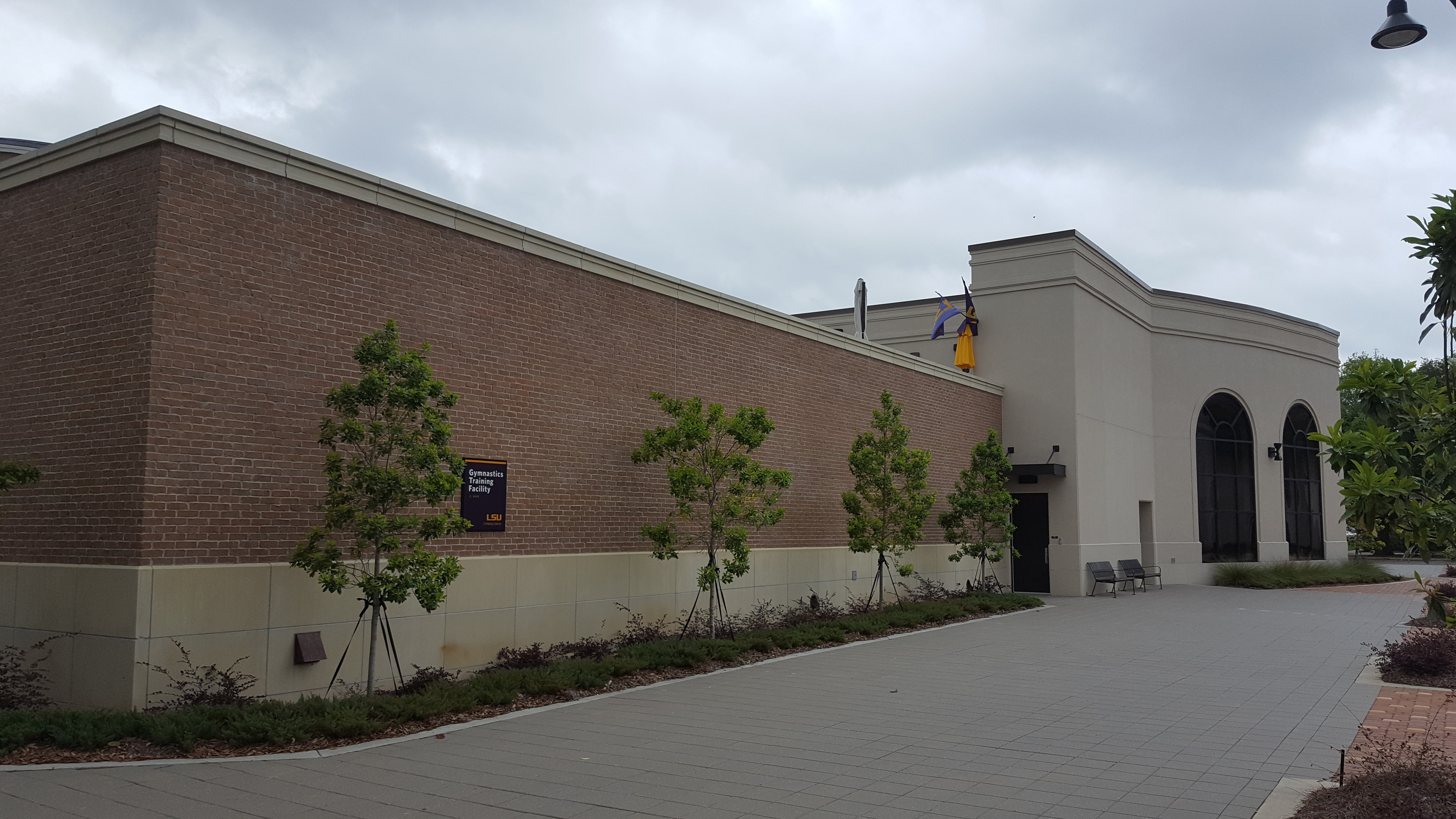
LSU Gymnastics Training Facility roof top terrace

== See also ==
- LSU Tigers women's gymnastics
- LSU Tigers and Lady Tigers
