= Sarah Finnegan =

American artistic gymnast

- Full name: Sarah Cruz Finnegan
- Born: November 14, 1996 (age 29)

Gymnastics career
- Discipline: Women's artistic gymnastics
- Country represented: United States; (2010–2012)
- College team: LSU Lady Tigers (2016–2019)
- Club: Great American Gymnastics Express
- Head coaches: Al Fong; Armine Barutyan Fong
- Retired: May 30, 2019
- Awards: AAI Award (2019)
Medal record
Representing the United States
Pan American Championships
Gold medal – first place	2010 Guadalajara	Team
Bronze medal – third place	2010 Guadalajara	Balance Beam
Representing Louisiana State Tigers
NCAA Championships
Gold medal – first place	2017 St. Louis	Uneven Bars
Gold medal – first place	2019 Fort Worth	Uneven Bars
Silver medal – second place	2019 Fort Worth	Team
Silver medal – second place	2019 Fort Worth	Balance Beam
Silver medal – second place	2016 Fort Worth	Team
Silver medal – second place	2017 St. Louis	Team
Bronze medal – third place	2017 St. Louis	Floor Exercise

Sarah Cruz Finnegan (Note: Although born in the United States, Sarah Finnegan still possesses her mother's maiden name (Cruz) as is the convention in the Philippines as indicated on public records.) (born November 14, 1996) is an American artistic gymnast and was an alternate for the 2012 Summer Olympics Gymnastics team. She competed for the Louisiana State Lady Tigers at the collegiate level, and was the 2017 and 2019 NCAA champion on uneven bars. She is the older sister of Aleah Finnegan.

== Personal life ==
Finnegan was born on November 14, 1996, to Don and Linabelle Finnegan. She has three sisters, Hannah, Jennah, and Aleah, who are all also gymnasts. Finnegan was home schooled in order to train as an elite gymnast. Finnegan began gymnastics in 1999. Her father died in August 2019.

In 2008, she and her family moved from St. Louis to Kansas City, Missouri so that she could train at GAGE. She said, "When I was at my old gym, I went to Regionals in 2008 and I saw GAGE there and I was like, 'Wow they're really good - I want to be like that,' so I talked with my parents and I've been there ever since." When asked how her gymnastics has changed she said, "It has improved a lot. I've gotten a lot stronger and my skills have improved. They focus on a bunch of technique and the little details have really helped me a lot. I really like trying new stuff. Especially tumbling passes and on beam. Just go up there and flip and twist and see what you come up with."

== Junior career ==
=== 2010 ===
In August, Finnegan competed at the Visa Championships in Hartford, Connecticut. She placed sixth in the all around with a two-day combined score of 111.350. In event finals, she placed fourth on balance beam scoring 28.400 and first on floor scoring 29.200.

In September, Finnegan competed at the Pan American Championships in Guadalajara, Mexico. She contributed a balance beam score of 14.400 towards the American team's first-place finish and placed third in the balance beam event final with a score of 14.150.

=== 2011 ===
In July, Finnegan competed at the Covergirl Classic in Chicago, Illinois. She placed fourth in the all around with a score of 56.650. In event finals, she placed third on uneven bars scoring 14.200, seventh on balance beam scoring 14.200, and first on floor scoring 14.500.

In August, Finnegan competed at the Visa Championships in Saint Paul, Minnesota. She placed third in the all around with a two-day combined score of 115.300. In event finals, she placed fifth on uneven bars scoring 27.800, third on balance beam scoring 29.050, and third on floor scoring 29.100.

== Senior career ==
=== Elite career: 2012 ===
In March, Finnegan competed at the City of Jesolo Trophy in Jesolo, Italy. She placed third in the all around with a score of 58.650. Finnegan said, "It was very cool that it was Italy. It was my second time there, but my first year I didn't get to compete because I injured my back. Competing this time was really cool because I got to see how everything works and see where I am in the competition. I learned a lot."

In May, Finnegan competed at the Secret U.S. Classic in Chicago, Illinois. She placed third on balance beam with a score of 14.900 and second on floor with a score of 15.200.

In June, Finnegan competed at the Visa Championships in St. Louis, Missouri. She placed sixth in the all around with a two-day combined score of 117.600. In events, she finish second on balance beam scoring 30.400 and fourth on floor scoring 29.950. She said, "It wasn't my best performance, but I have to learn from it and work hard and make it better for trials." Marta Karolyi said that Sarah is a "world-class gymnast, has the international look. She still has to get a tiny bit sturdier. Yesterday or the day before, the beam routine was solid and beautiful. Today it was a little bit shaky. She needs to work on just presenting very consistently what she can do."

At the beginning of July, Finnegan competed at the Olympic Trials in San Jose, California. She placed sixth in the all around with a two-day combined score of 118.500. In events, she placed sixth on uneven bars scoring 29.150, fifth on balance beam scoring 29.900, and sixth on floor scoring 29.550. She was named as one of the three replacement gymnasts for the 2012 Summer Olympics team known as the Fierce Five.

=== Club career: 2013-2015 ===
Finnegan missed the 2013 club season due to an injury, but competed for St. Louis Gymnastics Centre in 2014.

Sarah and her sisters, who are involved in competitive gymnastics, moved back to St. Louis Gymnastics Centre in Webster Groves, Mo., a gym they used to train at until 2008. Finnegan competed in a few Level 10 invitationals during the J.O. season.

== College career ==
Finnegan started college at Louisiana State University in the fall of 2015 and started competing with the LSU Lady Tigers gymnastics team in 2016. She was a kinesiology major.

=== 2016 ===
At the 2016 SEC Championships, Finnegan helped the Lady Tigers win team silver. She finished the 2016 season ranked fourth nationally on beam and eleventh on bars.

=== 2017 ===
At the 2017 NCAA Championships, she won individual gold on the uneven bars and bronze on floor, becoming the first NCAA bars champion from LSU. Finnegan also contributed to the Lady Tigers' team silver.

=== 2018 ===
At the 2018 NCAA Championships, the Lady Tigers placed fourth and Finnegan individually placed seventh on balance beam and eighth in all-around.

=== 2019 ===
At the 2019 SEC Championships Finnegan helped LSU win the team competition. Individually she placed first in the individual all-around, on uneven bars, on balance beam, and on floor exercise and placed third on vault. In April it was announced that Finnegan had won the AAI Award for 2019 for being the top senior gymnast. At the 2019 NCAA Championships Finnegan won gold on the uneven bars. In the all-around she finished fourth behind Maggie Nichols of Oklahoma, Kyla Ross of UCLA, and Lexy Ramler of Minnesota and on balance beam she finished second behind Natalie Wojcik of Michigan. The following day she helped LSU place second behind Oklahoma for the team title.

=== Career perfect 10.0 ===
Season	Date	Event	Meet
2018	March 4, 2018	Floor Exercise	LSU vs Auburn
2018	March 17, 2018	Balance Beam	LSU vs Arizona
2018	March 17, 2018	Uneven Bars	LSU vs Arizona
2019	March 1, 2019	Balance Beam	LSU vs Georgia
2019	March 15, 2019	Uneven Bars	LSU @ Arizona
2019	March 23, 2019	Floor Exercise	SEC Championships

== Competitive history ==
Year	Event	Team	AA	VT	UB	BB	FX
Junior
2010	U.S. National Championships		6			4	1st place, gold medalist(s)
2010	Pan American Championships	1st place, gold medalist(s)				3rd place, bronze medalist(s)	
2011	U.S. Classic		4		3rd place, bronze medalist(s)	7	1st place, gold medalist(s)
2011	U.S. National Championships		3rd place, bronze medalist(s)		5	3rd place, bronze medalist(s)	
Senior
2012	City of Jesolo Trophy	1st place, gold medalist(s)	3rd place, bronze medalist(s)	6	7	4	3rd place, bronze medalist(s)
2012	U.S. Classic					3rd place, bronze medalist(s)	2nd place, silver medalist(s)
2012	U.S. National Championships		6			2nd place, silver medalist(s)	4
2012	U.S. Olympic Trials		6		6	5	6
NCAA
2016	SEC Championships	3rd place, bronze medalist(s)		11		2nd place, silver medalist(s)	
2016	NCAA Championships	2nd place, silver medalist(s)			4		
2017	SEC Championships	1st place, gold medalist(s)	4	11		5	7
2017	NCAA Championships	2nd place, silver medalist(s)	4		1st place, gold medalist(s)	8	3rd place, bronze medalist(s)
2018	SEC Championships	1st place, gold medalist(s)	1st place, gold medalist(s)	13	7	4	8
2018	NCAA Championships	4	8			7	
2019	SEC Championships	1st place, gold medalist(s)	1st place, gold medalist(s)	3rd place, bronze medalist(s)	1st place, gold medalist(s)	1st place, gold medalist(s)	1st place, gold medalist(s)
2019	NCAA Championships	2nd place, silver medalist(s)	4	12	1st place, gold medalist(s)	2nd place, silver medalist(s)	

== Controversy ==
Finnegan caused a controversy in 2019 when she announced that she is selling her National team leotards to raise funds for a non-profit organisation called "ABBA Helps". Finnegan has claimed that the objective is to fight human trafficking, but it has soon come to public attention that the organisation, whose abbreviation stands for “Aborted Babies Born Alive”, is a non-profit run by her parents and its main focus is to fight women's right to abortion. The organisation has also perpetuated the right-wing myth of Planned Parenthood harvesting and reselling organs of aborted fetuses for profit.
