= Applied physiology =

Applied physiology is the study of how physiological principles are used to improve human function, performance, and health. It explores how the body responds to exercise, environmental stressors (like heat or altitude), and clinical conditions.

== See also ==
- Physiology
- Exercise physiology
- Environmental physiology
- Clinical physiology
