= Ashleigh Clare-Kearney =

American gymnast

- Born: April 7, 1986 (age 40)

Gymnastics career
- Discipline: Women's artistic gymnastics
- Country represented: United States
- College team: LSU Tigers
- Head coach: D-D Breaux

Ashleigh Clare-Kearney, (born April 7, 1986) is a two-time NCAA champion, who competed for the LSU Lady Tigers gymnastics team.

== NCAA career ==
Clare-Kearney was the 2009 NCAA champion in the vault and floor exercises.

== Coaching career ==
Clare-Kearney is a volunteer assistant coach for the LSU Lady Tigers gymnastics team.
