= LSU Tigers women's gymnastics =

Women's gymnastics team of Louisiana State University

- Founded: 1975 (50 years ago)
- University: Louisiana State University
- Head coach: Jay Clark (5th season)
- Conference: SEC; Division I Division
- Location: Baton Rouge, Louisiana
- Home arena: Pete Maravich Assembly Center (Capacity: 13,472)
- Nickname: Tigers
- Colors: Purple and gold

National championships
- 2024

Four on the Floor appearances
- 2019, 2023, 2024, 2026

Super Six appearances
- 2008, 2009, 2013, 2014, 2016, 2017, 2018

NCAA Tournament appearances
- 1982, 1983, 1985, 1986, 1987, 1988, 1989, 1990, 1991, 1992, 1993, 1994, 1995, 1996, 1997, 1998, 1999, 2000, 2001, 2002, 2003, 2004, 2005, 2006, 2007, 2008, 2009, 2012, 2013, 2014, 2015, 2016, 2017, 2018, 2019, 2021, 2022, 2023, 2024, 2025, 2026

Conference championships
- 1981, 2017, 2018, 2019, 2024, 2025

The LSU Tigers women's gymnastics team (Note: LSU uses the nickname of "Lady Tigers" only in sports that have both men's and women's teams. Since LSU only sponsors gymnastics for women, that team uses "Tigers" instead.) represents Louisiana State University in NCAA Division I women's gymnastics. The team competes in the Southeastern Conference and is coached by Jay Clark. The team's home venue is the Pete Maravich Assembly Center.

== History ==
The gymnastics program was founded in 1970. In 2008, LSU made their first Super Six appearance. The team also made Super Six appearances in 2009, 2013 and 2014. In both the 2016 and 2017 seasons, the program made the Super Six and finished second at the 2016 and 2017 NCAA Women's Gymnastics Championships. Also in 2017, LSU won back-to-back SEC Regular Season and SEC Championship Meet championships. In 2018, LSU again won back-to-back SEC Regular Season and SEC Championship Meet championships and reached the Super Six.

In 2019, LSU won the SEC Championship Meet in New Orleans and made an appearance in the first-ever Four on the Floor in NCAA Women's Gymnastics Championship. The team finished second overall for the third time in school history.

In 2022, LSU placed fifth at the SEC Championships with a score of 196.725 despite entering the competition with the No. 2 seed. No. 6 LSU placed third behind No. 11 Missouri and No. 22 Iowa in the first session of the semi-final of the Raleigh regional; this eliminated them from the postseason, leading to an 18th-place finish nationally.

In 2023, the team began hosting the annual Purple and Gold Podium Challenge at the Raising Cane's River Center Arena in Downtown Baton Rouge.

At the 2024 NCAA women's gymnastics tournament LSU earned their first National Championship team title.

== Championships ==
=== Individual NCAA champions ===
LSU Tigers Individual NCAA Championship Titles
Gymnast	All-Around	Vault	Uneven Bars	Balance Beam	Floor Exercise
Jeanie Beadle				1977 (Note: AIAW Championship)	
Nicki Arnstad					2002 (tie)
April Burkholder				2006	
Susan Jackson	2010	2008		2010	
Ashleigh Clare-Kearney		2009			2009 (tie)
Rheagan Courville		2013 (tie); 2014 (tie)			
Ashleigh Gnat					2017 (tie)
Sarah Finnegan			2017 (tie); 2019		
Kennedi Edney		2017; 2019 (tie)			
Haleigh Bryant	2024	2021 (tie)			
Aleah Finnegan					2024
Kailin Chio		2025			

=== Conference championships ===
- SEC Regular Season champions (6): 1981, 2015, 2016, 2017, 2018, 2025
- SEC Championship Meet champions (6): 1981, 2017, 2018, 2019, 2024, 2025

== NCAA Championship appearances ==
=== Super Six appearances ===
LSU Tigers Super Six Appearances
Year	Finish
2008	5th
2009	6th
2013	5th
2014	2nd
2016	2nd
2017	2nd
2018	4th

=== Four on the Floor appearances ===
LSU Tigers Four on the Floor Appearances
Year	Finish
2019	2nd
2023	4th
2024	1st
2026	2nd

== Arena and facilities ==
=== Pete Maravich Assembly Center ===
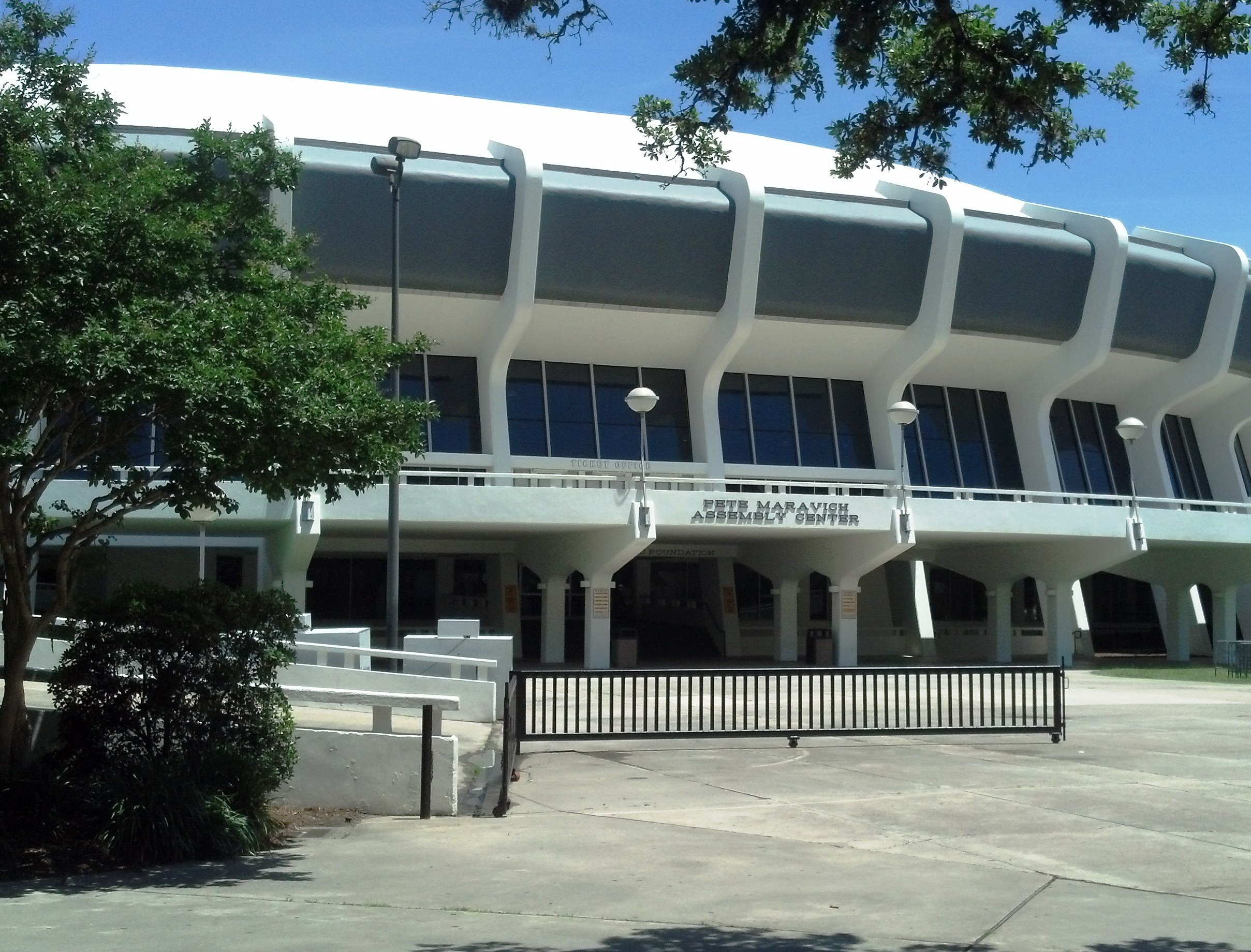
Pete Maravich Assembly Center

The Pete Maravich Assembly Center is a 13,215-seat multi-purpose arena in Baton Rouge, Louisiana. The arena opened in 1972 and is home of the LSU Tigers gymnastics team. It was originally known as the LSU Assembly Center, but was renamed in honor of Pete Maravich, a Tiger basketball legend, shortly after his death in 1988. The Maravich Center is known to locals as "The PMAC" or "The Palace that Pete Built," or by its more nationally known nickname, "The Deaf Dome," coined by Dick Vitale.

The slightly oval building is located directly to the north of Tiger Stadium, and its bright-white roof can be seen in many telecasts of that stadium. The arena concourse is divided into four quadrants: Pete Maravich Pass, The Walk of Champions, Heroes Hall and Midway of Memories. The quadrants highlight former LSU Tiger athletes, individual and team awards and memorabilia pertaining to the history of the LSU Tigers gymnastics team.

=== LSU Gymnastics Training Facility ===
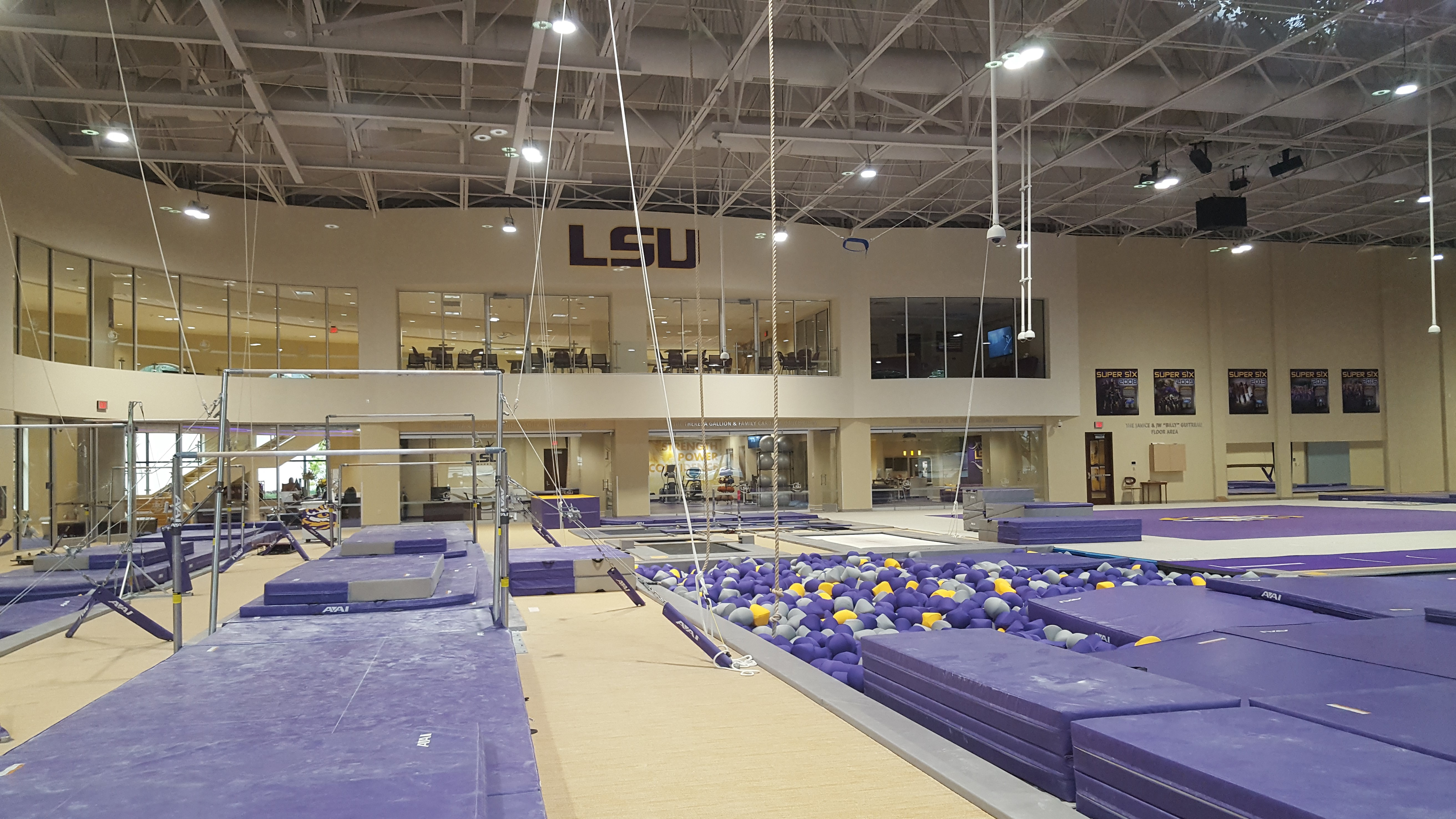
LSU Gymnastics Training Facility

The LSU Gymnastics Training Facility is the practice venue for the LSU Tigers gymnastics team. The new facility opened in 2016 and provides 38,000 square feet of training and team space.

=== LSU Strength and Conditioning facility ===
The LSU Tigers basketball strength training and conditioning facility is located in the LSU Strength and Conditioning facility. Built in 1997, it is located adjacent to Tiger Stadium. Measuring 10,000-square feet with a flat surface, it has 28 multi-purpose power stations, 36 assorted selectorized machines and 10 dumbbell stations along with a plyometric specific area, medicine balls, hurdles, plyometric boxes and assorted speed and agility equipment. It also features 2 treadmills, 4 stationary bikes, 2 elliptical cross trainers, a stepper and stepmill.

=== Raising Cane's River Center Arena ===
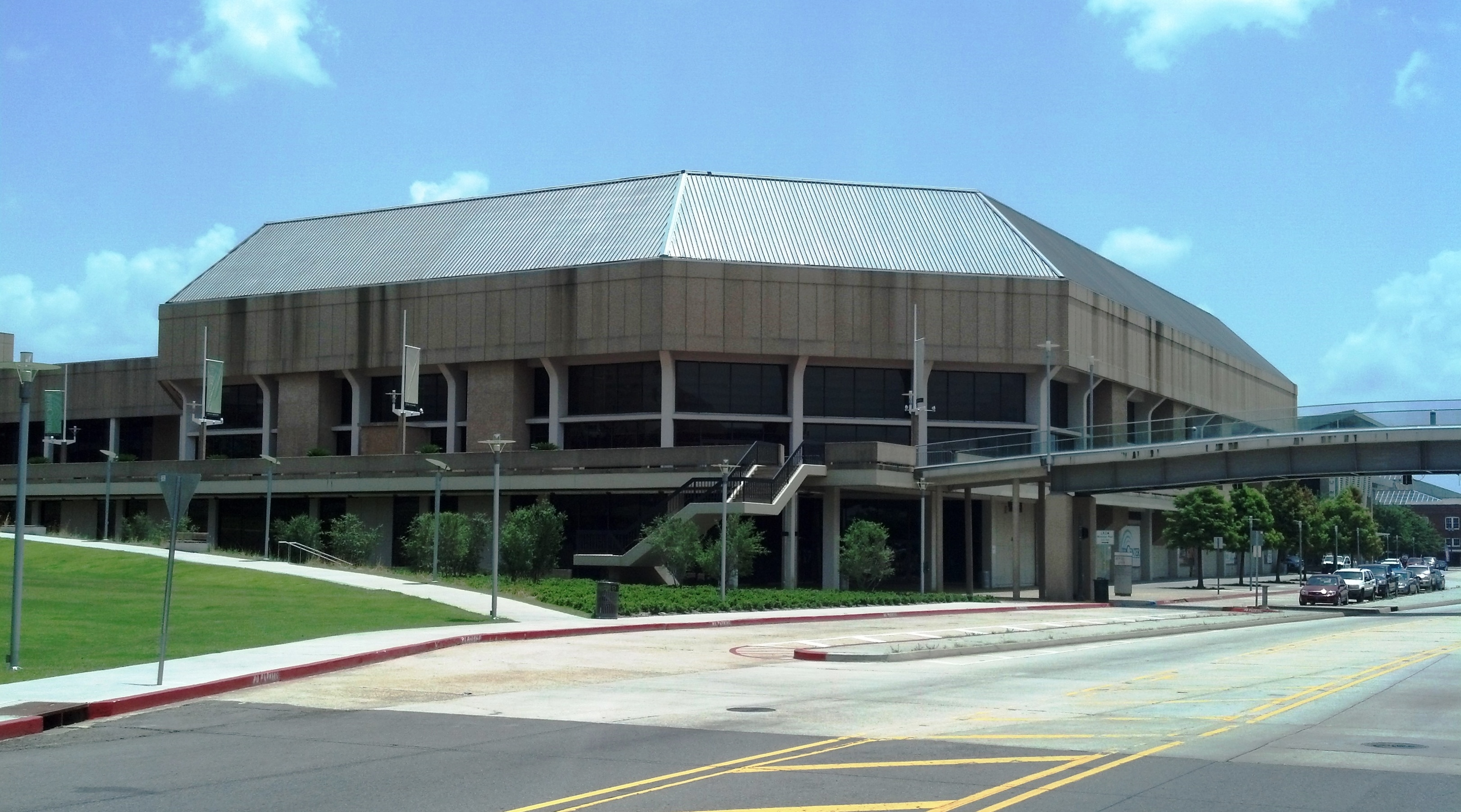
Raising Cane's River Center Arena

The Raising Cane's River Center Arena (originally the Riverside Centroplex Arena and commonly known as the River Center Arena) is a multi-purpose arena in Baton Rouge, Louisiana. The arena which opened in Downtown Baton Rouge in 1977 has an 8,900-seating capacity for sporting events.

== Head coaches ==
Name	Seasons	All W/L/T	Win %
Jackie Walker	1974–1977	21–1–0	.955
D-D Breaux	1978–2020	800–410–8	.660
Jay Clark	2020–present		

== Roster ==
2026–2027 Roster
Name	Height	Year	Hometown	Club
Nina Ballou	4-11	SO	Boca Raton, FL	American Twisters
Kailin Chio	5-4	JR	Henderson, NV	Gym Cats
Kylie Coen	5-6	SR	Bedford, TX	Empire Gymnastics Academy
Ashley Cowan	5-3	SR	Hillsborough, NC	Bull City Gymnastics
Amari Drayton	5-1	SR	Spring, TX	World Champions Centre
Skyelar Kerico	5-0	5th	Toms River, NJ	University of Pennsylvania
Kaliya Lincoln	5-1	JR	Frisco, TX	WOGA
Jordyn Lyden	5-6	SR	Stillwater, MN	Flips Gymnastics
Konnor McClain	5-2	SR	Las Vegas, NV	Gymcats Gymnastics
Zoe Miller	5-2	R-SO	Spring, TX	World Champions Centre
Annalisa Milton	5-1	FR	Lee's Summit, MO	GAGE
Malea Milton	5-1	FR	Lee's Summit, MO	GAGE
Haley Mustari	5-6	SO	Edmond, OK	Dynamo Gymnastics
Ariel Posen	5-5	SR	Manalapan, NJ	Arena Gymnastics
Victoria Roberts	5-3	JR	Belle Chasse, LA	Edge Gymnastics
Madison Ulrich	5-2	SR	Fort Mill, SC	Southeastern Gymnastics
Audree Valdenarro	5-1	FR	Newhall, CA	Gymnastics Olympica
Elyse Wenner	5-3	SO	Breinisville, PA	Stallone Gymnastic
Lexi Zeiss	5-2	JR	Omaha, NE	Twin City Twisters

== Coaching staff ==
- Head coach: Jay Clark
- Associate head coach: Garrett Griffeth
- Associate head coach: Courtney McCool Griffeth
- Assistant coach: Haleigh Bryant
- Director of Operations: Katie Copeland

== Past Olympians ==
- Shanyn MacEachern (Canada) (1996)
- Sarah Finnegan (2012 alternate)
- Ruby Harrold (United Kingdom) (2016)
- Aleah Finnegan (Philippines) (2024)

== See also ==
- LSU Tigers and Lady Tigers
