= Jay Clark (coach) =

Women's collegiate gymnastics coach at LSU

Current position
- Title: Head Coach
- Team: LSU
- Conference: SEC

Biographical details
- Born: Oklahoma
- Education: University of Georgia

Coaching career (HC unless noted)
- 1990–1996: Georgia (Asst)
- 1998–2003: Georgia (Asst)
- 2004–2008: Georgia (AHC)
- 2009–2012: Georgia
- 2013–2019: LSU (AHC)
- 2020–present: LSU

Accomplishments and honors

Championships
- 1 x NCAA National champions (2024) 5 x SEC Regular Season champions (2015, 2016, 2017, 2018, 2025) 5 x SEC Championship champions (2017, 2018, 2019, 2024, 2025)

Awards
- 2024 SEC Co-Head Coach of the Year, Named #9 recruiter in College Sports by "ESPN the Magazine" in 2011; National Assistant Coach of the Year 2006, 2014,2017. Inducted into USA Gymnastics Region 8 Hall of Fame 2017

Jay Clark is an American gymnastics coach who is the current head coach of the LSU Tigers gymnastics program at the Louisiana State University in Baton Rouge, Louisiana. He coached LSU to their first NCAA Championship title in 2024. Clarke previous served as Head Coach at the Georgia GymDogs before moving to the LSU Tigers in 2012.

== Coaching career ==
=== Georgia (1990-2012) ===
Clark started as an assistant coach at the Georgia Gym Dogs in 1990. He also served as the recruiting coordinator from 1999-2009 and associate head coach from 2005-09 when Georgia won a record five-straight NCAA national titles. He was promoted to head coach in 2009 when Suzanne Yoculan retired after 25 years with the team. During that time the Gym Dogs captured three NCAA individual national championships. Clark primarily coached bars and he coached the Gym Dogs to 64 All-America honors and seven NCAA individual national titles on bars, including two-time champions Courtney Kupets and Kat Ding. He resigned after the 2012 season.

Clark also coached at the club level for 13 years from 1992-2005 as the founder, owner and head coach of Classic City Gymnastics in Athens, Georgia.

=== LSU (2013-present) ===
After 20 seasons at Georgia, Clarke took an Associate Head Coach position with the LSU Tigers in 2013, serving under D-D Breaux. He was promoted to Head Coach in 2020 and in his fourth season he made history as the first team to bring a national championship home to Baton Rouge. The Tigers became the eighth program in NCAA history to win the national title, with their score of 198.225 defeating California (197.850), Utah (197.800) and Florida (197.4375) at the 2024 NCAA Championships. As head coach, Clarke has also coach the Tigers to 2 SEC Championship titles (2024 & 2025) and 1 SEC regular season title (2025).

== Personal life ==
Clark is a native of Roswell, Georgia. He graduated from Roswell High School and the University of Georgia . He has two children, a son, Cole, and a daughter, Kinsey.
