= 2016 NCAA women's gymnastics tournament =

American college gymnastics competition

- Venue: Fort Worth Convention Center
- Location: Fort Worth, Texas
- Dates: April 15–16
- Teams: 12

Medalists
gold medal	Oklahoma
silver medal	LSU
bronze medal	Alabama

The 2016 NCAA women's gymnastics tournament were held April 15–16, 2016, at the Fort Worth Convention Center in Fort Worth, Texas. The 2016 edition marks the second consecutive time the Championship has been held in Fort Worth; this only the second time it has been held in the state of Texas. Following the 2016 championship, Fort Worth has hosted the NCAA Women's Gymnastics Championship every year since 2018. The team competition was won by Oklahoma with a score 197.675.

== Qualification and selection process ==
=== Selection process ===
The championship provides for a field of 36 teams determined based on their regional qualifying score and seeded by the NCAA Women’s Gymnastics Committee. Additionally, 24 all-around competitors and 48 individual event specialists (12 on each piece) are eligible to advance to Regionals – as long as they're on a non-qualifying team.

=== Regionals ===
As a result, six NCAA Regional competitions – all of which contain 6 teams, 4 all-around competitors and 2 individual event specialists per event (8 in total) – took place on April 2, 2016. The selection show to announce the placements for teams and individuals will take place during the weekend of March 25–27, 2016.

== Regional Championships ==
2016 NCAA Regional locations

Based on their Regional Qualifying Score (RQS), the top 18 out of 36 teams are assigned to compete at one of the 6 NCAA regional championship locations. The remaining 18 teams are divided into 3 groups, with the highest ranked teams receiving priority, and placed at a regional location based on location proximity. Gymnasts who competed as specialists were assigned to a location based on location proximity.

=== Tuscaloosa Regional ===
The Tuscaloosa Regional was held at the Coleman Coliseum, on the campus of the University of Alabama; it was hosted by the Alabama Crimson Tide gymnastics team. 1st - Alabama (197.125), 2nd - California (195.925), Boise State (195.750), Kentucky (195.725), West Virginia (194.250) and Bowling Green (193.850).

- Alabama had the highest score in each of the events except for balance beam in which they received 2nd place.
- This regionals was also Alabama's 34th consecutive regionals.
- Alex Hyland (Kentucky) and Sidney Dukes (Kentucky) were all-around individual qualifiers.
- Shani Remme from Boise State and Taylor Allex from Arizona State were individual event qualifiers.

=== Minneapolis Regional ===
The Minneapolis Regional was held at the University of Minnesota Sports Pavilion. The Minnesota Golden Gophers women's gymnastics team hosted the Florida Gators, Denver Pioneers, Missouri Tigers, BYU Cougars and Ohio State Buckeyes. 1st - Florida (196.725), 2nd - Minnesota (196.175), Missouri (195.85), Denver (195.70), Ohio State (194.775) and Brigham Young (194.075).

- This was the Florida Gators 5th consecutive NCAA-Regional title.
- With a score of 39.375, olympian Bridget Sloan received her 2nd regional all-around title.
- Nina McGee (Denver) and Morgan Porter (Missouri) qualified for individual events and Meaghan Sievers (Iowa State) qualified for all-around.

=== Ann Arbor Regional ===
The Ann Arbor Regional was held at the University of Michigan's Crisler Center. The Michigan Wolverines women's gymnastics team hosted Eastern Michigan, Penn State, New Hampshire, Auburn, and Stanford. 1st - Auburn (196.525), 2nd - Stanford (196.525), Michigan (196.475), Eastern Michigan (196.250), Penn State (195.125), New Hampshire (193.900).

- Auburn and Stanford had a tie in their overall scores; however, Auburn became the victor after further evaluation.
- Nicole Artz (Michigan) and Brianna Brown (Michigan) were all-around qualifiers.
- Talia Chiarelli (Michigan), Rachel Slocum (Eastern Michigan), Briannah Tsang (Penn State), and Lindsay Offutt (Pittsburgh) all qualified for individual events.

=== Athens Regional ===
The Athens Regional was held at Stegeman Coliseum at the University of Georgia. The Georgia Gym Dogs hosted LSU, Oregon State, Arizona, George Washington, and Michigan State. 1st - LSU (197.300), 2nd - Georgia (196.850), Oregon State (196.000), Arizona (195.900), George Washington (195.550) and Michigan State (195.350).

- LSU placed 2nd among all teams who competed in one of the six regional locations.
- Lisa Burt (Michigan State) and Madeline Gardiner (Oregon State) were all-around qualifiers.
- Lexi Mills (Arizona) and Risa Perez (Oregon State) were individual qualifiers.

=== Salt Lake City Regional ===
The Salt Lake City Regional was held at the University of Utah's Jon M. Huntsman Center. The Utah Red Rocks hosted Utah State, Southern Utah, Illinois, UCLA, and Washington. 1st - Utah (197.125), 2nd - UCLA (196.375), Washington (195.825), Illinois (195.350), Utah State (195.025), Southern Utah (194.950)

- Danielle Ramirez (Southern Utah) and Allison Northey (Washington) were all-around qualifiers.
- Lizzy LeDuc (Illinois) was the only individual event qualifier from this regional championship.

=== Iowa City Regional ===
The Iowa City Regional was held at Carver-Hawkeye Arena. The Iowa Hawkeyes women's gymnastics team hosted Oklahoma, Nebraska, Arkansas, Kent State, and Central Michigan. 1st - Oklahoma (197.575), 2nd - Nebraska (196.550), Arkansas (195.500), Iowa (195.450), Central Michigan (194.675) and Kent State (194.525).

- Oklahoma won their 7th consecutive regional title and qualified for the 13th consecutive NCAA championship. This team also received the highest team score among all regional championships.
- Mollie Drenth (Iowa) and Amanda Wellick (Arkansas) were all-around qualifiers.
- This was the only 2016 regional championship to not have an individual event qualifier.

== NCAA Women's Gymnastics Championship ==
On April 15, 2016 top two finishers from the six regions competed to advance to the national team title meet on April 16, 2016. The top three finishers of each session form the Super Six Team.

- Afternoon session (1 p.m. CST) – Florida (197.475), LSU (197.3375), Georgia (196.725), Stanford (195.575), Auburn (195.100), Minnesota (194.9875)
- Evening session (7 p.m. CST) – Oklahoma (197.7875), Alabama (197.3875), UCLA (196.700), Cal (195.850), Nebraska (195.775), Utah (195.7625)

== NCAA Championship (Super Six Finals) ==
Super Six finals was held on April 16, 2016, at 8 p.m. CT and broadcast live on ESPNU.

- Team Championship - 1st Oklahoma (197.6750), 2nd LSU (197.4500), 3rd Alabama (197.4375), 4th Florida (197.3500), 5th UCLA 196.8250), 6th Georgia (196.8125)

== Individual Event Finals ==
#	Vault	Uneven bars	Balance beam	Floor exercise	All around
1	Katie Bailey (Alabama); Brandie Jay (Georgia)	Bridget Sloan (Florida); Brittany Rogers (Georgia)	Bridget Sloan (Florida); Danusia Francis (UCLA)	Nina McGee (Denver)	Bridget Sloan (Florida)
2	—	—	—	Myia Hambrick (LSU)	Chayse Capps (Oklahoma)
3	Ashleigh Gnat (LSU); Hollie Blanske (Nebraska)	McKenzie Wofford (Oklahoma)	Natalie Brown (Oklahoma)	AJ Jackson (Oklahoma)	Myia Hambrick (LSU)
