= D-D Breaux =

American collegiate gymnastics coach

Current position
- Title: Head coach
- Team: LSU
- Conference: SEC

Biographical details
- Born: January 19, 1953; Donaldsonville, Louisiana
- Education: Louisiana State University

Coaching career (HC unless noted)
- 1973–1975: Southeastern Louisiana (asst.)
- 1978–2020: LSU

Accomplishments and honors

Awards
- National Gymnastics Coach of the Year (2014,2017); SEC Coach of the Year (1990, 1993, 1994, 1995, 2000, 2005, 2015, 2017); NCAA Central Regional Coach of the Year (1999, 2002, 2005, 2006, 2010, 2013, 2014, 2015, 2017)

Sara "D-D" Breaux is an American former gymnastics coach. She was the head coach of the LSU Tigers women's gymnastics team. She is regarded as the "Dean of Coaches" at Louisiana State University, having led the gymnastics team from 1978 to 2020.

Breaux has an overall record of 800–410–8 (.660) at LSU. She led her teams to thirty-five appearances in the NCAA Championships including one "Four on the Floor" (final four) finish and seven "Super Six" (top six) finishes in 2008, 2009, 2013, 2014, 2016, 2017 and 2018. She captured eighteen NCAA Regional titles with sixteen at LSU in 1978, 1979, 1980, 1986, 2002, 2004, 2005, 2008, 2009, 2013, 2014, 2015, 2016, 2017, 2018 and 2019. The Lady Tigers were the SEC Regular Season champions in 2017 and 2018 and the SEC Meet champions in 1981, 2017, 2018 and 2019.

Breaux was selected the National Gymnastics Coach of the Year in 2014 after she guided LSU to a third-place finish at the NCAA Women's Gymnastics championships. She was also named a finalist for National Coach of the Year honors in 1988 for guiding the Tigers to a fourth-place finish at the NCAA Women's Gymnastics championships. Breaux has been the SEC Coach of the Year on nine occasions (1990, 1993, 1994, 1995, 2000, 2005, 2015, 2017 and 2019) and NCAA Central Regional Coach of the Year eight times (1999, 2002, 2005, 2006, 2010, 2013, 2014, 2015 and 2017).

Breaux has coached 13 individual national titles, 239 All-America honors and 85 All-SEC honors as of the finish of the 2018 season.

In 2009, Breaux was inducted into the USA Gymnastics Region 8 Hall of Fame and in 2017 she was inducted into the Louisiana Sports Hall of Fame.

Breaux announced her retirement from coaching in August 2020. Although retiring from coaching she will be a part of LSU’s Athletic Department.

== Gymnast career ==
As a gymnast, Breaux was nationally ranked and a Junior Olympic National Champion. She was a gymnast on the Southeastern Louisiana University gymnastics team and was considered one of the top 15 gymnasts in the country in 1972–73. She qualified to compete at the World Games Olympic Trials when a career-ending knee injury forced her to retire and she became an assistant coach at Southeastern Louisiana.

== Personal ==
Breaux is the mother of two children, Jewel Pollock Fourrier and Sara Pollock Dickson. She is also the grandmother to Porter Fourrier, Chase Fourrier, Robby Dickson, and Rose Dickson.

On June 17, 2016, it was reported Breaux's annual salary was increased to $240,000 (a $45,000 raise), set to run through to the 2018–19 season. In 2018, it was reported Breaux was getting a raise from $275,000 to $405,000 per season.
