= SEC Gymnastics Championships =

Gymnastics competition in Southeastern US

The SEC Gymnastics Championships is the conference championship in gymnastics for the Southeastern Conference. Seeding is based on the regular season record. As of 2025, all 9 schools that sponsor women's gymnastics will be invited to the SEC Championship, previously it had been the top eight teams. Starting in 2017, the best team or teams with the best regular season record are recognized as well. A win at this championship does not guarantee a spot in the NCAA women's gymnastics tournament as qualifying for the tournament is determined by the team's national qualifying score (NQS) and their national ranking.

== History ==
=== Championships ===
‡ would go onto placing 1st in the NCAA championships

Year	Champion	Score	Runner-up	Site
1981	LSU	141.100	Florida	
1982	Florida	145.600	Alabama	
1983	Florida	181.950	Alabama	
1984	Florida	184.140	Georgia	
1985	Florida	185.650	Alabama	
1986	Georgia	185.150	Florida	
1987	Georgia‡	189.400	Florida	
1988	Alabama‡	190.150	Georgia	
1989	Florida	191.590	Alabama	
1990	Alabama	193.550	LSU	
1991	Georgia	194.100	Alabama‡	
1992	Georgia	196.400	Alabama	
1993	Georgia‡	197.050	Alabama	
1994	Georgia	196.700	Alabama	
1995	Alabama	196.175	LSU	
1996	Georgia	197.450	Alabama‡	
1997	Georgia	198.375	Florida	
1998	Georgia‡	197.600	Florida	
1999	Georgia‡	197.475	Alabama	
2000	Alabama	197.200	LSU	Stephen C. O'Connell Center; Gainesville, Florida
2001	Georgia	198.000	Alabama	Bartow Arena; Birmingham, Alabama
2002	Georgia	197.025	Alabama‡	Bartow Arena; Birmingham, Alabama
2003	Alabama	197.575	Georgia	Bartow Arena; Birmingham, Alabama
2004	Georgia	198.175	Alabama	Gwinnett Center; Duluth, Georgia
2005	Georgia‡	197.250	LSU	Gwinnett Center; Duluth, Georgia
2006	Georgia‡	197.275	Alabama	Bartow Arena; Birmingham, Alabama
2007	Florida	197.325	Georgia‡	Alltell Arena; North Little Rock, Arkansas
2008	Georgia‡	187.350	Alabama	Gwinnett Center; Duluth, Georgia
2009	Alabama		Georgia‡	Sommet Center; Nashville, Tennessee
2010	Florida	197.05	Alabama	Veterans Memorial Arena; Jacksonville, Florida
2011	Alabama‡	197.225	Florida	Legacy Arena Birmingham, Alabama
2012	Florida	197.150	Alabama	Gwinnett Center; Duluth, Georgia
2013	Florida‡	198.000	Alabama	Alltell Arena; North Little Rock, Arkansas
2014	Alabama	197.875	Florida‡	Legacy Arena Birmingham, Alabama
2015	Alabama	197.525	LSU	Gwinnett Center; Duluth, Georgia
2016	Florida	197.775	Alabama	Alltell Arena; North Little Rock, Arkansas
2017	LSU	198.075	Florida	Veterans Memorial Arena; Jacksonville, Florida
2018	LSU	197.400	Florida	Chaifetz Arena St. Louis, Missouri
2019	LSU	197.900	Florida	Smoothie King Center; New Orleans, Louisiana
2020	No event held due to COVID-19 pandemic			
2021	Alabama	197.875	LSU	Von Braun Center; Huntsville, Alabama
2022	Florida	198.200	Alabama	Legacy Arena; Birmingham, Alabama
2023	Florida	198.425*	Alabama	Gas South Arena; Duluth, Georgia
2024	LSU‡	198.075	Alabama	Smoothie King Center; New Orleans, Louisiana
2025	LSU	198.200	Oklahoma‡	Legacy Arena; Birmingham, Alabama
2026	Florida	198.175	Oklahoma‡	BOK Center; Tulsa, Oklahoma

*SEC Championship Record

=== Individual champions ===
‡ would go onto placing 1st in the NCAA championships

† would onto to placing at the NCAA Championships in that event

+ Perfect 10

Year	All-Around	Vault	Uneven Bars	Balance Beam	Floor Exercise
1981	Lynn McDonnell (Florida)	Sandra Smith (LSU)	Kathy McMinn (Georgia)	Lynn McDonnell (Florida)	Sandra Smith (LSU)
1982	Lynn McDonnell (Florida)	Kathy McMinn (Georgia) Sandra Smith (LSU)	Julie Garrett (Alabama)	Lynn McDonnell (Florida)	Sandra Smith (LSU)
1983	Elfi Schlegel (Florida)	Sandra Smith (LSU)	Kathy McMinn (Georgia) Barbara Mack (Alabama)	Karen McDonnell (Florida) Elfi Schlegel (Florida)	Patti Rice (Alabama)
1984	Kathy McMinn (Georgia)	Elfi Schlegel (Florida)	Kathy McMinn (Georgia)	Kim Hellner (Florida)	Maria Anz (Florida) ‡
1985	Penney Hauschild (Alabama)‡	Kelly McCoy (Florida)	Anita Botnen (Florida) Barbara Mack (Alabama)	Michelle Godwin (Florida)	Maria Anz (Florida)‡
1986	Julie Klick (Georgia)	Julie Estin (Alabama) Tammy Smith (Florida) Paula Maheu (Georgia)	Julie Estin (Alabama)	Elfi Schlegel (Florida)	Melissa Miller (Florida)
1987	Terri Eckert (Georgia)	Corrine Wright (Georgia)	Terri Eckert (Georgia)	Julie Klick (Georgia)	Corrine Wright (Georgia)
1988	Melissa Miller (Florida)	Jennifer Lyerly (LSU) Julianne Wilson (LSU)	Lucy Wener (Georgia)	Melissa Miller (Florida)	Melissa Miller (Florida)
1989	Melissa Miller (Florida) Lucy Wener (Georgia)	Karen Brennalt (Florida) Katherine Kelleher (Alabama)	Lucy Wener (Georgia)‡	Andrea Thomas (Georgia)	Melissa Miller (Florida) Pam Titus (Florida)
1990	Marie Robbins (Alabama)	Jami Snopek (LSU)	Corrine Wright (Georgia)	Andrea Thomas (Georgia)	Corrine Wright (Georgia)
1991	Rachelle Fruge (LSU)	Dee Foster (Alabama)	Kelly Macy (Georgia) Christina McDonald (Florida) Gina Basile (Alabama) Sandy Rowlette (Georgia) Elizabeth Wilson (Georgia)	Rachelle Fruge (LSU) Dee Foster (Alabama) Kelly Macy (Georgia)	Dee Foster (Alabama)
1992	Heather Stepp (Georgia)	Heather Stepp (Georgia) Hope Spivey-Sheeley (Georgia) Sandy Rowlette (Georgia)	Agina Simpkins (Georgia)	Dana Dobransky (Alabama) Nneka Logan (Georgia)	Hope Spivey-Sheeley (Georgia)
1993	Dee Foster (Alabama) Jenny Hansen (Kentucky)‡	+ Jenny Hansen (Kentucky)	Jenny Hansen (Kentucky) Lori Strong (Georgia)	Nneka Logan (Georgia)	Hope Spivey-Sheeley (Georgia)
1994	Leah Brown (Georgia)	+ Jenny Hansen (Kentucky) ‡	Jennifer Wood (LSU)	Becky Erwin (Auburn)	Jenny Hansen (Kentucky) Hope Spivey-Sheeley (Georgia)‡
1995	Kristen Guise (Florida)	+ Kim Kelly (Alabama)	Kristen Guise (Florida) Stephanie Woods (Alabama) Andrea Dewey (Georgia)	Jenny Hansen (Kentucky)‡	Jenny Hansen (Kentucky) ‡
1996	Lori Strong (Georgia)	Leah Brown (Georgia)‡	Jenni Beathard (Georgia)	Jenny Hansen (Kentucky)	Kim Kelly (Alabama)‡ Leslie Angeles (Georgia) Leah Brown (Georgia) Jenny Hansen (Kentucky)
1997	Kim Arnold (Georgia)‡	+ Kim Arnold (Georgia) + Leah Brown (Georgia)	Leah Brown (Georgia) Karin Lichey (Georgia)	Karin Lichey (Georgia) Kim Arnold (Georgia)‡	Leah Brown (Georgia)‡
1998	Kim Arnold (Georgia)	+ Karin Lichey (Georgia)	Karin Lichey (Georgia) Jenni Beathard (Georgia)	Kim Arnold (Georgia)‡ Amy McClosky (LSU)	+ Kim Arnold (Georgia)
1999	Kim Arnold (Georgia)	Suzanna Sears (Georgia) Karin Lichey (Georgia)	Jenni Beathard (Georgia)	Chrissy Van Fleet (Florida)	Karin Lichey (Georgia)
2000	Andree Pickens (Alabama)	Andree Pickens (Alabama)	Andree Pickens (Alabama)	Kristi Lichey (Georgia)	Suzanna Sears (Georgia)‡
2001	Corey Fritzinger (Georgia)	Kristi Lichey (Georgia)	Kathleen Shrieves Georgia) Natalie Barrington (Alabama) Corey Fritzinger (Georgia)	Lissy Smith (Alabama) Corey Fritzinger (Georgia)	Suzanna Sears (Georgia) Marline Stephens (Georgia)
2002	Andree Pickens (Alabama)	Marline Stephens (Georgia) Andree Pickens (Alabama)	Andree Pickens (Alabama)‡	Andree Pickens (Alabama)	Marline Stephens (Georgia)
2003	Jeana Rice (Alabama)	+ Chelsa Byrd (Georgia)	Jeana Rice (Alabama)	Jeana Rice (Alabama)	Chelsa Byrd Ashley Miles (Alabama)
2004	Jeana Rice (Alabama)‡	Jeana Rice (Alabama)	Jeana Rice (Alabama) Corey Fritzinger (Georgia)	+ Corey Fritzinger (Georgia)	+ Ashley Miles (Alabama)‡ + Marline Stephenson (Georgia)
2005	Katie Heenan (Georgia)	Ashley Miles (Alabama)	Ashley Miles (Alabama) Terin Humphrey (Alabama)‡	Katie Heenan (Georgia)	Ashley Miles (Alabama)
2006	Kelsey Ericksen (Georgia)	Kelsey Ericksen (Georgia)	Courtney Kupets (Georgia)‡ Kelsey Ericksen (Georgia) Melanie Banville (Alabama)	April Burkholder (LSU)‡	Kelsey Ericksen (Georgia) Ashley Miles (Alabama)† Brittany Magee (Alabama)
2007	Courtney Kupets (Georgia)‡ Katie Heenan (Georgia)	Courtney Kupets (Georgia)‡	Courtney Kupets (Georgia)†	Ricki Lebegern (Alabama)	Amanda Castillo (Florida)
2008	Ashleigh Clare-Kearney (LSU)	Ashley Reed (Florida)	Melanie Sinclair (Florida)	Corey Hartung (Florida)	Amanda Castillo (Florida)
2009	Courtney Kupets (Georgia)‡	Courtney Kupets (Georgia)† Morgan Dennis (Alabama)	Courtney Kupets (Georgia)‡	Courtney Kupets (Georgia)‡ Susan Jackson (LSU) Casey Jo Magee (Arkansas)	Courtney Kupets (Georgia)‡ Morgan Dennis (Alabama)
2010	Ashley Priess (Alabama)	Morgan Dennis (Alabama) Susan Jackson (LSU)† Hilary Mauro (Georgia)	Kat Ding (Georgia)	Ashley Priess (Alabama)	Courtney McCool (Georgia)
2011	Cassidy McComb (Georgia)†	Kayla Hoffman (Alabama)	Kat Ding (Georgia)‡	Geralen Stack-Eaton (Alabama)	Geralen Stack-Eaton (Alabama)‡ Ashanée Dickerson (Florida)
2012	Kytra Hunter (Florida)‡	Kytra Hunter (Florida)‡	Alaina Johnson (Florida)	Ashanée Dickerson (Florida)	Lloimincia Hall (LSU)
2013	Bridget Sloan (Florida)‡	Rheagan Courville (LSU)	Bridget Sloan (Florida)†	Rheagan Courville (LSU) Brittany Rogers (Georgia) Shayla Worley (Georgia)	Bridget Sloan (Florida) Kytra Hunter (Florida)
2014	Bridget Sloan (Florida)	Lauren Johnson (Georgia) Diandra Milliner (Alabama)	+ Bridget Sloan (Florida) ‡	Kytra Hunter (Florida)	Diandra Milliner (Alabama) Kytra Hunter (Florida) Lloimincia Hall (LSU)
2015	Jessie Jordan (LSU) Rheagan Courville (LSU)	Rheagan Courville (LSU) Myia Hambrick (LSU) Alex McMurty (Florida) Kytra Hunter (Florida) Kaitlyn Clark (Alabama)	+ Bridget Sloan (Florida)	Bridget Sloan (Florida)	Lloimincia Hall (LSU) Kytra Hunter (Florida)‡
2016	Kennedy Baker (Florida)	Mackenzie Brannan (Alabama) Kennedy Baker (Florida)	Katie Bailey (Alabama) Kiana Winston (Alabama)	Alex McMurty (Florida)	+ Ashleigh Gnat (LSU)
2017	Alex McMurty (Florida)‡	Ashleigh Gnat (LSU)	Katie Bailey (Alabama)‡ Lexie Priessman (LSU)	Kiana Winston (Alabama) Alex Hyland (Kentucky) Ashleigh Gnat (LSU)	Alex McMurty (Florida) Kennedy Baker (Florida) McKenna Kelley (LSU) Ashleigh Gnat (LSU)‡
2018	Sarah Finnegan (LSU)	Alex McMurty (Florida)‡	Alex McMurty (Florida)	Alyssa Baumann (Florida)	Ariana Guerra Alicia Boren (Florida) Sidney Dukes (Kentucky)
2019	Sarah Finnegan (LSU)	Trinity Thomas (Florida)	Sarah Finnegan (LSU) ‡	Lexi Graber (Alabama) Megan Skaggs (Florida) Rachel Gowey (Florida) Alyssa Baumann (Florida) Sarah Finnegan (LSU)†	Sarah Finnegan (LSU)
2020	No event held due to COVID-19 pandemic				
2021	Luisa Blanco (Alabama)†	Luisa Blanco (Alabama) Elena Arenas (LSU) Haleigh Bryant (LSU)‡	Shania Adams (Alabama) Makarri Doggette (Alabama) Luisa Blanco (Alabama)†	Ellie Lazzari (Florida) Alyssa Baumann (Florida) Lexi Graber (Alabama) Luisa Blanco (Alabama) ‡	Kiya Johnson (LSU)
2022	Trinity Thomas (Florida)‡	Trinity Thomas (Florida)	Sunisa Lee (Auburn)	Leanne Wong (Florida)	Trinity Thomas (Florida)‡
2023	Trinity Thomas (Florida)	Gabby Gladieux (Alabama) Cassie Stevens (Auburn) Sloane Blakely (Florida) Jocelyn Moore (Missouri)	Trinity Thomas (Florida)†	Leanne Wong (Florida)	Trinity Thomas (Florida)
2024	Haleigh Bryant (LSU)‡	Haleigh Bryant (LSU)	Ashley Cowan (LSU)	Konnor McClain (LSU)	KJ Johnson (LSU)†
2025	Haleigh Bryant (LSU)	+ Selena Harris-Miranda (Florida)	+ Leanne Wong (Florida)† + Riley McCusker (Florida) + Mara Titarsolej (Missouri)†	Aleah Finnegan (LSU) Haleigh Bryant (LSU) Helen Hu (Missouri) ‡ Faith Torrez (Oklahoma)†	+ Faith Torrez (Oklahoma)†
2026	Kailin Chio (LSU)	Kailin Chio (LSU)	Selena Harris-Miranda (Florida)	Faith Torrez (Oklahoma)	Mackenzie Estep (Oklahoma) Gabby Gladieux (Alabama) Kaliya Lincoln (LSU) Keira Wells (Oklahoma)

=== By School (1981–present) ===
School	SEC Debut	Championships	Years
Georgia	1981	16	1986, 1987, 1991, 1992, 1993, 1994, 1996, 1997, 1998, 1999, 2001, 2002, 2004, 2005, 2005, 2008
Florida	1981	13	1982, 1983, 1984, 1985, 1989, 2007, 2010, 2012, 2013, 2016, 2022, 2023, 2026
Alabama	1981	10	1988, 1990, 1995, 2000, 2003, 2009, 2011, 2014, 2015, 2021
LSU	1981	6	1981, 2017, 2018, 2019, 2024, 2025
Arkansas	2003	0	
Auburn	1981	0	
Kentucky	1981	0	
Missouri	2013	0	
Oklahoma	2025	0	
