= 2018 American Cup =

- Venue: Sears Centre Arena
- Location: Hoffman Estates, Illinois, U.S.
- Dates: March 3, 2018
- Competitors: 18 from 11 nations

Medalists
gold medal	(United States) Morgan Hurd (United States) Yul Moldauer
silver medal	(Japan) Mai Murakami (United Kingdom) James Hall
bronze medal	(United States) Maile O'Keefe (Ukraine) Petro Pakhniuk

The 2018 American Cup was part of the World Cup circuit in artistic gymnastics.

== Participants ==
NOC	Women (WAG)	Men (MAG)
United States	Morgan Hurd	Yul Moldauer
United States; Wildcard	Maile O'Keefe	Allan Bower
Brazil	Fabiane Brito	Francisco Barretto Júnior
Canada	Brooklyn Moors	—N/a
China	Mao Yi	Sun Wei
France	Lorette Charpy	—N/a
Germany	Elisabeth Seitz	Philipp Herder
United Kingdom	Kelly Simm	James Hall
Japan	Mai Murakami	Kenzō Shirai
Spain	—N/a	Néstor Abad
Ukraine	—N/a	Petro Pakhnyuk

== Results ==
=== Women ===
Rank	Gymnast	Vault (gymnastics)	Uneven bars	Balance beam	Floor (gymnastics)	Total
1st place, gold medalist(s)	Morgan Hurd (USA)	14.566	14.200	13.800	14.033	56.599
2nd place, silver medalist(s)	Mai Murakami (JPN)	14.600	13.400	13.600	14.033	55.633
3rd place, bronze medalist(s)	Maile O'Keefe (USA)	14.600	13.233	13.066	13.466	54.365
4	Lorette Charpy (FRA)	13.400	13.833	12.866	12.866	52.965
5	Kelly Simm (GBR)	13.833	12.966	12.633	12.466	51.898
6	Elisabeth Seitz (GER)	13.600	14.200	11.600	12.466	51.866
7	Brooklyn Moors (CAN)	12.433	12.166	11.466	13.433	49.498
8	Fabiane Brito (BRA)	14.233	–	–	–	DNF
9	Mao Yi (CHN)	12.900	–	–	–	DNF

=== Men ===
Rank	Gymnast	Floor (gymnastics)	Pommel horse	Rings (gymnastics)	Vault (gymnastics)	Parallel bars	Horizontal bar	Total
1st place, gold medalist(s)	Yul Moldauer (USA)	14.666	14.066	14.333	14.733	14.500	13.666	85.964
2nd place, silver medalist(s)	James Hall (GBR)	13.766	14.166	14.033	14.333	13.133	13.866	83.297
3rd place, bronze medalist(s)	Petro Pakhniuk (UKR)	13.066	13.066	13.800	14.766	14933	13.433	83.064
4	Philipp Herder (GER)	13.766	13.100	13.433	14.400	14.166	13.100	81.965
5	Allan Bower (USA)	13.333	13.966	13.400	14.533	13.766	12.866	81.864
6	Kenzō Shirai (JPN)	14.966	11.100	13.700	15.066	14.500	12.166	81.498
7	Sun Wei (CHN)	14.433	13.733	14.133	14.733	12.600	11.300	80.932
8	Francisco Barretto Júnior (BRA)	12.700	13.466	13.300	13.666	13.500	12.200	78.832
9	Néstor Abad (ESP)	13.433	11.600	13.733	14.200	13.133	12.333	78.432

== Nastia Liukin Cup ==
The Nastia Liukin Cup
- Venue: Sears Centre Arena
- Location: Hoffman Estates, Illinois, U.S.
- Dates: March 2, 2018
- Competitors: 36

The 9th annual Nastia Liukin Cup was held in conjunction with the 2018 American Cup. Since its inception in 2010, the competition has always been held on the Friday night before the American Cup, in the same arena.

=== Medal winners ===
Event	Gold	Silver	Bronze
Senior
All-around	Haleigh Bryant	Andrea Li	Raegan Walker
Junior
All-around	Tory Vetter	Jacey Vore	Faith Torrez

=== Notable competitors ===
Senior winner Haleigh Bryant would go on to win the 2020 Nastia Liukin Cup. Additionally she was the 2021 NCAA champion on vault and 2024 NCAA all-around champion. Senior competitor Natalie Wojcik would go on to win the balance beam title at the 2019 NCAA Championships.

Junior bronze medalist Faith Torrez would go on to become the 2026 NCAA all-around champion. Fellow juniors Olivia Greaves and Kailin Chio, along with Torrez, would go on to make the USA national team, with Chio winning the vault title at the 2025 NCAA Championships and being the all-around runner-up behind Torrez in 2026.
