= 2025 SEC Gymnastics Championship =

Gymnastics competition in Alabama, US

- Venue: Legacy Arena
- Location: Birmingham, Alabama
- Dates: March 22, 2025
- Teams: 8
- Winning score: 198.200

Medalists
gold medal	LSU
silver medal	Oklahoma
bronze medal	Florida

The 2025 SEC Gymnastics Championships was held on March 22, 2025 at the neutral site Legacy Arena at the BJCC in Birmingham, Alabama. No. 02 LSU posted a score of 198.200, winning back-to-back SEC Championships, their sixth SEC title.

== Team results ==
Oklahoma and LSU share the regular season title, both holding a 7-1 conference record. This is Oklahoma's first season in the SEC, previously competing in the Big 12. LSU is the reigning SEC champion and NCAA champion.

The top eight teams (determined by NQS), with seeds 5-8 competing in the afternoon session (Session 1), and seeds 1-4 in the evening session (session 2). The seeding was announced on March 17, 2025. The only team that didn't qualify was Arkansas. This is the first year since the conference expansion that a team didn't make the SEC Championship. In response to the criticism surrounding their exclusion, the SEC announced at their spring meetings on May 29, 2025 that every team would participate in the SEC Championship beginning in 2026.

Session 1 (3:30 EDT)
Seed	Team	Vault	Uneven bars	Balance beam	Floor	Total
5	Kentucky	49.125	49.125	49.100	49.425	196.775
6	Georgia	49.000	49.200	48.825	49.125	195.950
7	Auburn	48.925	48.675	49.000	49.350	195.950
8	Alabama	49.300	49.275	49.275	49.250	197.100

Session II (8PM EDT)
Seed	Team	Vault	Uneven bars	Balance beam	Floor	Total
1	Oklahoma	49.425	49.550	49.475	49.475	197.925
2	LSU	49.525	49.600	49.450	49.625	198.200
3	Florida	49.500	49.850	49.100	49.375	197.825
4	Missouri	49.100	49.575	49.125	49.600	197.400

=== Final results ===
Rank	Team	Vault	Uneven bars	Balance beam	Floor exercise	Total
1st place, gold medalist(s)	LSU	49.525	49.600	49.450	49.625	198.200
2nd place, silver medalist(s)	Oklahoma	49.425	49.550	49.475	49.475	197.925
3rd place, bronze medalist(s)	Florida	49.500	49.850	49.100	49.375	197.825
4	Missouri	49.100	49.575	49.125	49.600	197.400
5	Alabama	49.300	49.275	49.275	49.250	197.100
6	Kentucky	49.125	49.125	49.100	49.425	196.775
7	Auburn	48.925	48.675	49.000	49.350	195.950
7	Georgia	49.000	49.200	48.825	49.125	195.950

== Individual results ==
=== Medalists ===
Event	Gold	Silver	Bronze
Individual all-around	Haleigh Bryant (LSU)	Aleah Finnegan (LSU) Selena Harris-Miranda (Florida)	N/A
Vault	Selena Harris-Miranda (Florida)	Haleigh Bryant (LSU) Elle Mueller (Oklahoma)	N/A
Uneven bars	Leanne Wong (Florida) Riley McCusker (Florida) Mara Titarsolej (Missouri)	N/A	N/A
Balance beam	Aleah Finnegan (LSU) Haleigh Bryant (LSU) Helen Hu (Missouri) Faith Torrez (Oklahoma)	N/A	N/A
Floor	Faith Torrez (Oklahoma)	Amari Drayton (LSU) Haleigh Bryant (LSU) Kailin Chio (LSU) Jocelyn Moore (Missouri) Kennedy Griffin (Missouri) Jordan Bowers (Oklahoma)	N/A

=== All-around ===
Rank	Gymnast	Team	Vault (gymnastics)	Uneven bars	Balance beam	Floor (gymnastics)	Total
1st place, gold medalist(s)	Haleigh Bryant	LSU	9.950	9.950	9.925	9.950	39.725
2nd place, silver medalist(s)	Aleah Finnegan	LSU	9.900	9.950	9.925	9.900	39.675
2nd place, silver medalist(s)	Selena Harris-Miranda	Florida	10.000	9.950	9.825	9.900	39.675
4	Kailin Chio	LSU	9.900	9.950	9.850	9.950	39.650
5	Faith Torrez	Oklahoma	9.850	9.775	9.925	10.000	39.550
6	Jordan Bowers	Oklahoma	9.800	9.900	9.875	9.950	39.525
7	Gabby Gladieux	Alabama	9.900	9.850	9.850	9.900	39.500
8	Addison Fatta	Oklahoma	9.8750	9.925	9.875	9.800	39.475
9	Amari Celestine	Missouri	9.850	9.875	9.750	9.925	39.400
9	Leanne Wong	Florida	9.875	10.000	9.675	9.850	39.400
11	Skylar Killough-Wilhelm	Kentucky	9.750	9.925	9.775	9.875	39.325
12	Lilly Hudson	Alabama	9.925	9.875	9.800	9.700	39.300
