= Jordan Bowers =

American artistic gymnast (born 2003)

- Full name: Jordan Skylar Bowers
- Born: April 5, 2003 (age 23) Lincoln, Nebraska, U.S.
- Spouse: Raydel Gamboa (m. 2025)

Gymnastics career
- Discipline: Women's artistic gymnastics
- Country represented: United States; (2018)
- College team: Oklahoma Sooners (2022–2025)
- Club: Nebraska
- Head coach: K.J. Kindler
- Former coach: Danelle Catlett
- Choreographer: Payton Prall
Medal record
Representing the United States
Junior Pan American Championships
| Gold medal – first place | 2018 Buenos Aires | Team |
| Gold medal – first place | 2018 Buenos Aires | All-around |
| Gold medal – first place | 2018 Buenos Aires | Uneven bars |
| Gold medal – first place | 2018 Buenos Aires | Floor exercise |
| Bronze medal – third place | 2018 Buenos Aires | Balance beam |
Representing Oklahoma Sooners
NCAA Championships
| Gold medal – first place | 2022 Fort Worth | Team |
| Gold medal – first place | 2023 Fort Worth | Team |
| Gold medal – first place | 2025 Fort Worth | Team |
| Gold medal – first place | 2025 Fort Worth | All-around |
| Silver medal – second place | 2022 Fort Worth | Floor exercise |
| Silver medal – second place | 2024 Fort Worth | Floor exercise |
| Silver medal – second place | 2025 Fort Worth | Floor exercise |
| Bronze medal – third place | 2024 Fort Worth | Uneven bars |
| Bronze medal – third place | 2025 Fort Worth | Uneven bars |

Jordan Bowers
Current position
- Title: Assistant coach
- Team: Nebraska Cornhuskers
- Conference: Big Ten

Biographical details
- Education: University of Oklahoma

Coaching career (HC unless noted)
- 2026–present: Nebraska Cornhuskers (Asst.)

Jordan Skylar Gamboa (née Bowers; born April 5, 2003) is an American former artistic gymnast and current assistant coach for the Nebraska Cornhuskers. As an elite level gymnast, she won the junior all-around gold medals at the 2018 Pacific Rim Championships and the 2018 Junior Pan American Championships. She competed for the Oklahoma Sooners in NCAA gymnastics where she was the 2025 NCAA all-around champion.

== Personal life ==
Bowers was born in 2003 to John and Tracy Bowers and has a sister named Felicity. She started gymnastics in 2005.

Since 2021, Bowers has been in a relationship with Raydel Gamboa, a former member of the Oklahoma Sooners men's gymnastics team. The couple announced their engagement in 2024. The pair were married on June 20, 2025.

== Gymnastics career ==
=== 2016–17 ===
Bowers began competing at the junior elite level in 2016, participating in both the American Classic and the P&G National Championships.

=== 2018 ===
Bowers was officially added to the junior national team after she was named to the team to compete at the 2018 Pacific Rim Gymnastics Championships alongside seniors Morgan Hurd, Grace McCallum, and Jordan Chiles and fellow juniors Kayla DiCello and Sunisa Lee. There she won gold in the team, junior all-around, and junior floor exercise finals. She won bronze on uneven bars. Bowers later competed at the Pan American Championships alongside Leanne Wong, Tori Tatum, and JaFree Scott from June 13–15 in Buenos Aires, Argentina. There the team won gold in the team final and individually Bowers won gold in the all-around, on uneven bars, and on floor exercise. Additionally she won bronze on the balance beam behind Zoé Allaire-Bourgie of Canada and compatriot Wong.

On July 28 Bowers competed at the 2018 U.S. Classic. She finished third in the all-around behind Wong and DiCello after falling twice on floor exercise. She finished second on balance beam and uneven bars. Bowers traveled to Boston to compete in the 2018 U.S. Championships in August. She was one of the favorite to win the title based on her earlier victories in the all-around, but she struggled on the first day with multiple errors and finished in 17th place in the all-around on the first day. Bowers withdrew from the second day of competition, citing an injury sustained during training that had also hampered her on the first day of competition. Because she did not finish in the top six all-around, she was not automatically named to the national team.

=== 2019 ===
In 2019 Bowers became age-eligible for senior level competition. In February she attended the national team camp in hopes of making an international assignment. Just before the camp Bowers re-injured her lower back and it was determined she had a spinal disc herniation and an edema on her vertebrae. She sat out the remainder of the season in order to recover.

On November 2, Bowers announced on Instagram that she had retired from elite gymnastics and would continue training as a level 10 gymnast with the intention of competing at the University of Oklahoma, starting in the 2021–22 season.

=== 2020–21 ===
On November 11, 2020 Bowers signed her National Letter of Intent with the Oklahoma Sooners.

Bowers competed at the 2021 Developmental Program National Championships where she placed third in the all-around in the Senior-E division. Additionally she placed second on balance beam and uneven bars.

== Collegiate gymnastics career ==
=== 2021–2022 season ===
Bowers made her NCAA debut on January 9 in a meet against Alabama. She competed the all-around, posting the highest score of the day on floor with a 9.925. The following week in a meet against Utah she scored a 9.975 on vault, the highest of the meet. Her all-around score of 39.550 was the second highest behind Grace McCallum. As a result Bowers was named Big 12 Gymnast of the Week for the first time. At the 2022 NCAA Championships Bowers helped Oklahoma win the team title. Individually Bowers finished second on floor exercise behind Trinity Thomas.

=== 2022–2023 season ===
Throughout the season Bowers earned two perfect 10s, one on floor exercise and one on uneven bars. At the Big 12 Championships Bowers helped Oklahoma win the team title. Individually she won the all-around and floor exercise titles and placed third on uneven bars and balance beam. At the 2023 NCAA Championships Bowers once again helped Oklahoma finish first as a team.

=== 2023–2024 season ===
At the Big 12 Championships Bowers earned three perfect 10 scores, accumulating an all-around total of 39.925, winning her the all-around title. As a team, Oklahoma earned a score of 198.950, setting the overall NCAA gymnastics team record. At the 2024 NCAA Championships Bowers alongside teammates Faith Torrez and Katherine LeVasseur suffered mishaps on vault. As a result Oklahoma did not qualify to the Four on the Floor final. However, Bowers still was a co-runner-up on floor exercise behind Aleah Finnegan and a co-third place finisher on the uneven bars.

Bowers was nominated for the Honda Sports Award alongside Haleigh Bryant, Jade Carey, and Leanne Wong; ultimately Bryant won the award.

=== 2024–2025 season ===
Oklahoma joined the Southeastern Conference (SEC) in Bowers' final collegiate season. At the SEC Championships, Bowers helped Oklahoma finish second behind reigning national champions LSU. Individually she finished second on floor exercise and sixth in the all-around. She was named SEC Gymnast of the Year after having a 100% hit rate while competing the all-around in every meet of the season. During the regional final in Washington, Bowers, for the second time in her career, earned three perfect tens in a single meet.

Bowers was named as one of six finalists for the AAI Award, which recognizes the top senior female gymnast in the nation for her dedication, leadership, and excellence in the sport, alongside teammate Audrey Davis, Jade Carey, Aleah Finnegan, Grace McCallum, and Leanne Wong. She ultimately lost to Carey.

At the NCAA Championships Bowers helped Oklahoma advance to Four on the Floor and eventually win the team title. Individually she scored a 39.7125 in the all-around to win the national title. Bowers won the Honda Sports Award.

=== Career perfect 10.0 ===
| Season | Date | Event | Meet |
|---|---|---|---|
| 2022 | March 4, 2022 | Vault | Oklahoma vs Michigan |
| 2023 | February 24, 2023 | Floor exercise | Oklahoma vs West Virginia |
| 2023 | March 30, 2023 | Uneven bars | Norman Regional Semifinal |
| 2024 | February 2, 2024 | Uneven bars | Oklahoma & Cal @ Arizona State |
| 2024 | March 10, 2024 | Floor exercise | Oklahoma @ Arkansas |
| 2024 | March 17, 2024 | Floor exercise | Oklahoma vs Alabama |
| 2024 | March 23, 2024 | Vault | Big 12 Championships |
| 2024 | March 23, 2024 | Uneven bars | Big 12 Championships |
| 2024 | March 23, 2024 | Floor exercise | Big 12 Championships |
| 2025 | April 6, 2025 | Vault | Washington Regional Final |
| 2025 | April 6, 2025 | Uneven bars | Washington Regional Final |
| 2025 | April 6, 2025 | Floor exercise | Washington Regional Final |

=== NCAA Regular season ranking ===
| Season | All-Around | Vault | Uneven Bars | Balance Beam | Floor Exercise |
|---|---|---|---|---|---|
| 2022 | N/A | 1st | 15th | N/A | 19th |
| 2023 | 5th | 11th | 10th | 7th | 8th |
| 2024 | 2nd | 5th | 1st | 13th | 2nd |
| 2025 | 2nd | 21st | 11th | 4th | 3rd |

== Coaching career ==
After completing her four years of NCAA eligibility, Bowers spent her fifth and final year at the University of Oklahoma as a student coach with the Sooner women's gymnastics program, while also working as a strength and conditioning intern for several OU sports, including football, baseball, softball, men's and women's track, volleyball, women's golf, and women's tennis. In May 2026, she was announced as an assistant coach for the Nebraska Cornhuskers women's gymnastics team, starting in the 2026–2027 season.

== Competitive history ==
| Year | Event | Team | AA | VT | UB | BB | FX |
Junior
| 2016 | American Classic | | 8 | | | 6 | |
| 2016 | P&G National Championships | | 14 | 21 | 12 | 22 | 10 |
| 2017 | American Classic | | 8 | | | 8 | |
| 2017 | U.S. Classic | | 32 | 22 | 9 | 41 | 36 |
| 2017 | P&G National Championships | | 13 | 12 | 7 | 28 | 10 |
| 2018 | Pacific Rim Championships | 1st place, gold medalist(s) | 1st place, gold medalist(s) | | 3rd place, bronze medalist(s) | | 1st place, gold medalist(s) |
| 2018 | Pan American Championships | 1st place, gold medalist(s) | 1st place, gold medalist(s) | | 1st place, gold medalist(s) | 3rd place, bronze medalist(s) | 1st place, gold medalist(s) |
| 2018 | U.S. Classic | | 3rd place, bronze medalist(s) | 7 | 2nd place, silver medalist(s) | 2nd place, silver medalist(s) | 29 |
NCAA
| 2022 | Big 12 Championships | 1st place, gold medalist(s) | | 10 | 4 | | 1st place, gold medalist(s) |
| 2022 | NCAA Championships | 1st place, gold medalist(s) | | 21 | 13 | | 2nd place, silver medalist(s) |
| 2023 | Big 12 Championships | 1st place, gold medalist(s) | 1st place, gold medalist(s) | 5 | 3rd place, bronze medalist(s) | 3rd place, bronze medalist(s) | 1st place, gold medalist(s) |
| 2023 | NCAA Championships | 1st place, gold medalist(s) | 14 | | | | |
| 2024 | Big 12 Championships | 1st place, gold medalist(s) | 1st place, gold medalist(s) | 1st place, gold medalist(s) | 1st place, gold medalist(s) | 6 | 1st place, gold medalist(s) |
| 2024 | NCAA Championships | 6 | 19 | | 3rd place, bronze medalist(s) | 2nd place, silver medalist(s) | |
| 2025 | SEC Championships | 2nd place, silver medalist(s) | 6 | 29 | 16 | 11 | 2nd place, silver medalist(s) |
| 2025 | NCAA Championships | 1st place, gold medalist(s) | 1st place, gold medalist(s) | 8 | 3rd place, bronze medalist(s) | 8 | 2nd place, silver medalist(s) |

== Awards ==
| Year | Award | Result | Ref |
|---|---|---|---|
| 2024 | Big 12 gymnast of the year | Won | |
| 2024 | Honda Sports Award | Nominated | |
| 2025 | SEC gymnast of the year | Won | |
| 2025 | AAI Award | Nominated | |
| 2025 | Honda Sports Award | Won | |
