= 2019 American Cup =

- Venue: Greensboro Coliseum Complex
- Location: Greensboro, North Carolina, U.S.
- Dates: March 2, 2019
- Competitors: 16 from 11 nations

Medalists
gold medal	(United States) Leanne Wong (United States) Yul Moldauer
silver medal	(United States) Grace McCallum (United States) Sam Mikulak
bronze medal	(Canada) Ellie Black & (Japan) Mai Murakami (China) Ma Yue

The 2019 American Cup was part of the World Cup circuit in artistic gymnastics.

== Participants ==
The top 8 teams from the 2018 World Championships were allowed to send a competitor. If they declined the invite, the next highest ranked team could send a competitor. Marcel Nguyen of Germany withdrew after suffering an injury during practice. Kenzō Shirai of Japan also withdrew due to an ankle injury.

NOC	Women (WAG)	Men (MAG)
United States	Grace McCallum	Sam Mikulak
United States; Wildcard	Leanne Wong	Yul Moldauer
Canada	Ellie Black	—N/a
China	Lu Yufei	Ma Yue
France	Célia Serber	—N/a
Germany	Kim Bui	~~Marcel Nguyen~~
United Kingdom	—N/a	James Hall
Japan	Mai Murakami	~~Kenzō Shirai~~
South Korea	Lee Yun-seo	—N/a
Netherlands	Sanna Veerman	Bart Deurloo
Switzerland	—N/a	Christian Baumann
Ukraine	—N/a	Petro Pakhnyuk

== Results ==
=== Women ===
Rank	Gymnast	Vault (gymnastics)	Uneven bars	Balance beam	Floor (gymnastics)	Total
1st place, gold medalist(s)	Leanne Wong (USA)	14.666	14.100	14.066	13.933	56.765
2nd place, silver medalist(s)	Grace McCallum (USA)	14.566	14.200	13.833	13.866	56.465
3rd place, bronze medalist(s)	Ellie Black (CAN)	14.433	14.266	13.800	13.233	55.732
3rd place, bronze medalist(s)	Mai Murakami (JPN)	14.433	13.933	13.233	14.133	55.732
5	Kim Bui (GER)	13.800	14.400	12.766	13.233	54.199
6	Lu Yufei (CHN)	13.233	13.300	12.566	12.600	51.699
7	Sanna Veerman (NED)	14.100	12.666	12.166	11.833	50.765
8	Célia Serber (FRA)	13.566	10.666	12.966	12.600	49.798
9	Lee Yun-seo (KOR)	12.900	13.600	10.233	11.133	47.866

=== Men ===
Rank	Gymnast	Floor (gymnastics)	Pommel horse	Rings (gymnastics)	Vault (gymnastics)	Parallel bars	Horizontal bar	Total
1st place, gold medalist(s)	Yul Moldauer (USA)	14.500	13.800	14.200	14.733	14.966	13.733	85.932
2nd place, silver medalist(s)	Sam Mikulak (USA)	14.733	14.433	14.100	14.433	14.066	14.166	85.931
3rd place, bronze medalist(s)	Ma Yue (CHN)	13.300	14.033	14.333	14.566	14.333	13.900	84.465
4	Petro Pakhniuk (UKR)	14.133	13.433	13.366	13.833	14.366	13.733	82.864
5	James Hall (GBR)	13.466	14.200	13.666	14.500	14.333	12.533	82.698
6	Christian Baumann (SUI)	12.466	12.933	13.633	13.966	14.800	13.833	81.631
7	Bart Deurloo (NED)	12.766	12.166	12.500	13.500	12.100	13.900	76.932

== Nastia Liukin Cup ==
The Nastia Liukin Cup
- Venue: Greensboro Coliseum Complex
- Location: Greensboro, North Carolina, U.S.
- Dates: March 1, 2019
- Competitors: 36

The 10th annual Nastia Liukin Cup was held in conjunction with the 2019 American Cup. Since its inception in 2010, the competition has always been held on the Friday night before the American Cup, in the same arena.

=== Medal winners ===
Event	Gold	Silver	Bronze
Senior
All-around	Makarri Doggette	Jillian Hoffman	Kiya Johnson
Junior
All-around	Gabrielle Gladieux	Madison Ulrich	Ava Piedrahita

=== Notable competitors ===
Junior competitor Zoe Miller would go on to compete at the 2020 Olympic Trials.
