= Elena Arenas =

American artistic gymnast

- Full name: Elena Makenzie Arenas
- Nickname: Lena
- Born: August 31, 2001 (age 25) Milledgeville, Georgia, United States
- Height: 5 ft 1 in (155 cm)

Gymnastics career
- Discipline: Women's artistic gymnastics
- Country represented: United States
- College team: LSU Tigers
- Club: Georgia Elite
- Head coach: Pete Arenas
- Assistant coach: Amber Stiles
Medal record
Representing Louisiana State Tigers
NCAA Championships
Gold medal – first place	2024 Fort Worth	Team

Elena Makenzie Arenas (born August 31, 2001) is an American former artistic gymnast. She competed at the elite level before competing for the LSU Tigers. She is the 2021 SEC vault champion, and she won a team title at the 2024 NCAA Championships.

== Gymnastics career ==
=== Elite gymnastics career ===
Arenas trained at Georgia Elite Gymnastics in Watkinsville, Georgia, and was coached by her father. She qualified to compete at the junior international elite level in 2014. At the 2014 U.S. Classic, she tied for 24th place in the all-around. She qualified for the 2014 U.S. Championships and tied for 21st place in the all-around.

In 2015, Arenas won the junior all-around at the WOGA Classic ahead of Japan's Nagi Kajita. She then competed at the 2015 U.S. Classic and finished 19th in the all-around. Then at the 2015 U.S. Championships, she tied for 21st place in the all-around.

Arenas won a silver medal on the vault at the 2016 U.S. Classic, behind Jordan Chiles, and also placed tenth in the all-around. At the 2016 U.S. Championships, she fell three times and placed 11th in the all-around, failing to make the junior national team.

Arenas became age-eligible for senior elite competitions in 2017. At the 2017 U.S. Classic, she finished ninth in the all-around. Then at the 2017 U.S. Championships, she once again finished ninth in the all-around. She stopped competing at the elite level in 2018 and competed in Level 10 until she graduated from high school.

=== NCAA gymnastics career ===
In 2016, Arenas verbally committed to the LSU Tigers after also visiting Georgia, Alabama, Florida, and Auburn. She joined the team for the 2021 season and competed on the vault in every regular season meet. At the 2021 SEC Championships, she stuck a full-twisting Yurchenko and received the maximum possible score for that vault, 9.950, to win the conference title. She competed at the 2023 NCAA Championships on the vault, balance beam, and floor exercise, helping LSU finish fourth. She did not compete during the 2024 season due to an injury, but she won a team title with LSU at the 2024 NCAA Championships.

== Personal life ==
Arenas' parents are Pete and Kim Arenas (née Arnold). Her mother was also an elite gymnast and won two consecutive NCAA All-Around national championships. She has two sisters and a brother. The family lived in Bogart, Georgia, where Arenas was homeschooled and graduated in 2020.

Arenas graduated from Louisiana State University with a bachelor’s degree in sport administration in 2024.
