= 2023 SEC Gymnastics Championship =

2023 SEC Championship
- Venue: Gas South Arena
- Location: Duluth, Georgia
- Date: March 18, 2023
- Competitors: Florida; LSU; Auburn; Alabama; Kentucky; Missouri; Arkansas; Georgia
- Teams: 8
- Winning time: 198.425

Medalists
gold medal	Florida
silver medal	Alabama
bronze medal	LSU

The 2023 SEC Gymnastics Championship was held on March 18, 2023 at the neutral site of Gas South Arena in Duluth, Ga. All eight teams competed, with Florida posting a score of 198.425 to win the meet.

== Team Results ==
The top four nationally seeded teams were placed into the night session (II), and the bottom four seeded teams were placed into the day session (I). Florida won the 2023 regular season championship and the SEC Championship in back-to-back years.

=== Session 1 (March 18, 3:30PM ET) ===
Seed	Team	Vault	Uneven bars	Balance beam	Floor	Totals
5	Auburn	49.300	49.350	49.225	49.225	197.100
6	Arkansas	49.425	49.175	49.050	49.175	196.825
7	Missouri	48.900	49.400	49.375	49.325	197.000
8	Georgia	49.100	49.250	49.225	49.025	196.600

Session 1 (March 18, 8PM ET)
Seed	Team	Vault	Uneven bars	Balance beam	Floor	Totals
1	Florida	49.375	49.700	49.675	49.675	198.425
2	LSU	49.500	49.325	39.350	49.625	197.800
3	Alabama	49.525	49.475	49.375	49.550	197.925
4	Kentucky	49.325	49.600	49.350	49.400	197.675

=== Final Results ===
Rank	Team	Vault	Uneven bars	Balance beam	Floor	Totals
1st place, gold medalist(s)	Florida	49.375	49.700	49.675	49.675	198.425
2nd place, silver medalist(s)	Alabama	49.525	49.475	49.375	49.550	197.925
3rd place, bronze medalist(s)	LSU	49.500	49.325	49.350	49.625	197.800
4	Kentucky	49.325	49.600	49.350	49.400	197.675
5	Auburn	49.300	48.350	49.225	49.225	197.100
6	Missouri	48.900	49.400	48.375	49.325	197.000
7	Arkansas	49.425	49.175	49.050	49.175	196.825
8	Georgia	49.100	49.250	49.225	49.025	196.600

== Individual results ==
=== Medalists ===
Event	Gold	Silver	Bronze
Individual all-around	Trinity Thomas (Florida)	Luisa Blanco (Alabama)	Cassie Stevens (Auburn)
Vault	Gabby Gladieux (Alabama) Cassie Stevens (Auburn) Sloane Blakely (Florida) Jocelyn Moore (Missouri)	N/A	N/A
Uneven bars	Trinity Thomas (Florida)	Victoria Nguyen(Florida) Leanne Wong (Florida) Shealyn Luksik (Kentucky) Helen HU (Missouri)	N/A
Balance beam	Leanne Wong (Florida)	Luisa Blanco (Alabama) Kayla DiCello (Florida) Isabella Magnelli (Kentucky) Helen Hu (Missouri)	N/A
Floor	Trinity Thomas (Florida)	Lilly Hudson (Alabama) Kayla DiCello (Florida) Aleah Finnegan (LSU) Haleigh Bryant(LSU)	N/A

=== All-Around ===
Rank	Gymnast	Team	Vault (gymnastics)	Uneven bars	Balance beam	Floor (gymnastics)	Total
1st place, gold medalist(s)	Trinity Thomas	Florida	9.975	10.000	9.925	10.000	39.800
2nd place, silver medalist(s)	Luisa Blanco	Alabama	9.900	9.900	9.950	9.925	39.675
3rd place, bronze medalist(s)	Cassie Stevens	Auburn	9.950	9.900	9.900	9.900	39.650
4	Leanne Wong	Florida	9.900	9.950	9.975	9.800	39.625
4	Aleah Finnegan	LSU	9.900	9.850	9.925	9.950	39.625
6	Kayla DiCello	Florida	9.800	9.900	9.950	9.950	39.600
7	Haleigh Bryant	LSU	9.900	9.875	9.825	9.950	39.550
8	Lily Hudson	Alabama	9.825	9.875	9.850	9.950	39.500
8	Norah Flatley	Arkansas	9.900	9.875	9.825	9.900	39.500
8	Raena Worley	Kentucky	9.800	9.900	9.875	9.900	39.500
11	Alyona Shchennikova	LSU	9.875	9.800	9.875	9.900	39.450
12	Haley De Jong	Georgia	9.800	9.900	9.800	9.900	39.400
12	Jillian Procasky	Kentucky	9.875	9.900	9.900	9.900	39.400
14	Olivia Hollingsworth	Auburn	9.800	9.825	9.825	9.800	39.250
15	Sienna Schreiber	Missouri	9.525	9,875	9.900	9.775	39.075
16	Naya Howard	Georgia	9.850	9.225	9.850	9.800	38.725
17	Sophia Groth	Auburn	9.675	9,150	9,875	9.850	38.425
