= Lloimincia Hall =

American artistic gymnast

- Full name: Lloimincia D'Chelle Hall
- Nickname: Mincie
- Born: January 27, 1993 (age 33) Garland, Texas, U.S.

Gymnastics career
- Discipline: Women's artistic gymnastics
- College team: LSU Lady Tigers (2011-15)
- Club: Texas Dreams
- Head coach: D-D Breaux
- Assistant coach: Jay Clark
- Former coach: Kim Zmeskal

Lloimincia D'Chelle Hall (born January 27, 1993, in Garland, TX) is a former American artistic gymnast, who competed in the NCAA for the LSU Lady Tigers gymnastics team. Hall attracted significant media attention due to her unique and dynamic floor routine and choreography.

== Club career ==
Hall competed as a Level 10 throughout her whole competitive career. She was fifth at the 2009 J.O. Nationals, a Nastia Liukin Cup qualifier in 2010, 2010 J.O. National silver medalist and achieved a ninth-place finish at the 2011 J.O. Nationals in her final year of optionals.

Hall trained at Texas Dreams Gymnastics, under Kim Zmeskal, from 2008 through to 2011. Prior to her tenure at Texas Dreams, she was at Metroplex Gymnastics for two years in 2006-2007 and started her career at Kurt Thomas Gymnastics.

== College career ==
Hall started at Louisiana State University in the fall of 2011 and joined the LSU Lady Tigers gymnastics team for the 2012 season.

=== 2012 season: Freshman ===
Lloimincia quickly made a name for herself nationally, particularly on the floor, her best event. She was the SEC Floor Champion, scoring a 9.925. At the NCAA Regional, in Seattle, Wash., she placed fourth all-around.

She scored 9.875 on floor at the 2012 NCAA Championships in the Prelims and didn't qualify to the event final.

=== 2013 season: Sophomore ===
Hall scored two 10.0s during the regular season on floor and won most floor titles during the season.

=== 2015 season: Senior ===
In 2015, Hall scored two perfect 10.0s during regular season and contributed highly to the LSU Lady Tigers team during her senior year. Her floor routine choreography included a tribute to LSU Tigers football head coach, Les Miles.
