= 2020 American Cup =

United States artistic gymnastics competition

- Venue: Fiserv Forum
- Location: Milwaukee, Wisconsin, U.S.
- Dates: March 7, 2020
- Competitors: 24 from 14 nations

Medalists
gold medal	(United States) Morgan Hurd (United States) Sam Mikulak
silver medal	(United States) Kayla DiCello (Ukraine) Oleg Verniaiev
bronze medal	(Japan) Hitomi Hatakeda (United Kingdom) James Hall

The 2020 American Cup was part of the World Cup circuit in artistic gymnastics. It was the only All-Around World Cup help in 2020 as the others were canceled due to the worldwide COVID-19 pandemic. This was the final edition of the American Cup competition as an individual competition. In 2026, the competition returned using a mixed team format.

== Background ==
The American Cup was originally to be the first of four All-Around World Cups to be used as a way for countries to qualify an additional Olympic berth for the 2020 Olympic Games. However, due to the COVID-19 pandemic, the remaining World Cups in Birmingham, Stuttgart, and Tokyo were originally postponed until 2021 after the postponement of the 2020 Summer Olympics. However, in 2021 the World Cups were officially canceled and the Olympic berths were awarded to the top three countries from qualification during the 2019 World Championships. For men's artistic gymnastics this was Russia, China, and Japan; for women's it was the United States, China, and Russia.

== Participants ==
The top 12 teams from the 2019 World Championships were allowed to send a competitor. For women's artistic gymnastics, the Netherlands and Belgium opted not to send a competitor so 13th and 14th placed teams, Australia and Ukraine, were able to. The athletes from Russia withdrew last minute; therefore replacement athletes were not able to be selected.

NOC	Women (WAG)	Men (MAG)
United States	Morgan Hurd	Sam Mikulak
United States; Wildcard	Kayla DiCello	Shane Wiskus
Australia	Georgia Godwin	—N/a
Brazil	—N/a	Diogo Soares
Canada	Ellie Black	René Cournoyer
China	Zhang Jin	Hu Xuwei
France	Lorette Charpy	—N/a
Germany	Sarah Voss	Andreas Toba
Great Britain	Jennifer Gadirova	James Hall
Italy	Giorgia Villa	—N/a
Japan	Hitomi Hatakeda	Daiki Hashimoto
Spain	Alba Petisco	Néstor Abad
Switzerland	—N/a	Pablo Brägger
Chinese Taipei	—N/a	Lee Chih-kai
Ukraine	Diana Varinska	Oleg Verniaiev
Russia	~~Lilia Akhaimova~~	~~Nikita Nagornyy~~

== Results ==
=== Women ===
Rank	Gymnast	Vault (gymnastics)	Uneven bars	Balance beam	Floor (gymnastics)	Total
1st place, gold medalist(s)	Morgan Hurd (USA)	14.333	14.100	13.733	13.666	55.832
2nd place, silver medalist(s)	Kayla DiCello (USA)	14.533	13.733	13.466	13.400	55.132
3rd place, bronze medalist(s)	Hitomi Hatakeda (JPN)	13.600	13.866	13.400	12.933	53.799
4	Jennifer Gadirova (GBR)	14.566	11.366	13.933	13.700	53.565
5	Ellie Black (CAN)	13.733	13.800	13.166	12.600	53.299
6	Georgia Godwin (AUS)	13.666	13.100	13.233	11.700	51.699
7	Giorgia Villa (ITA)	14.300	12.766	12.533	11.933	51.532
8	Lorette Charpy (FRA)	13.433	13.500	12.733	11.266	50.932
9	Zhang Jin (CHN)	14.133	10.333	14.133	12.033	50.632
10	Diana Varinska (UKR)	13.500	11.100	13.133	12.700	50.433
11	Sarah Voss (GER)	12.333	13.466	12.933	11.600	50.332
12	Alba Petisco (ESP)	13.400	11.833	12.433	11.433	49.099

=== Men ===
Rank	Gymnast	Floor (gymnastics)	Pommel horse	Rings (gymnastics)	Vault (gymnastics)	Parallel bars	Horizontal bar	Total
1st place, gold medalist(s)	Sam Mikulak (USA)	14.333	13.800	14.100	14.400	14.666	14.033	85.332
2nd place, silver medalist(s)	Oleg Verniaiev (UKR)	12.766	14.533	14.133	14.800	13.966	12.866	83.064
3rd place, bronze medalist(s)	James Hall (GBR)	13.966	14.000	14.133	14.300	14.200	12.400	82.999
4	Shane Wiskus (USA)	14.033	13.433	13.866	14.366	13.366	13.733	82.797
5	Daiki Hashimoto (JPN)	13.666	13.400	13.900	13.500	14.066	14.225	82.757
6	Pablo Brägger (SUI)	13.966	12.933	13.566	13.933	13.900	14.141	82.439
7	Diogo Soares (BRA)	13.633	13.100	13.233	13.966	13.766	13.600	81.298
8	Lee Chih-kai (TPE)	13.166	13.941	13.066	13.200	13.900	13.333	80.606
9	Néstor Abad (ESP)	13.366	12.700	13.766	13.883	13.033	13.833	80.581
10	René Cournoyer (CAN)	13.633	11.733	13.200	14.033	13.466	12.233	78.298
11	Hu Xuwei (CHN)	13.700	12.066	13.733	12.300	11.900	14.000	77.699
12	Andreas Toba (GER)	11.766	13.266	13.633	13.766	13.566	11.133	77.130

== Nastia Liukin Cup ==
The Nastia Liukin Cup
- Venue: Fiserv Forum
- Location: Milwaukee, Wisconsin, U.S.
- Dates: March 6, 2020
- Competitors: 36

The 11th annual Nastia Liukin Cup was held in conjunction with the 2020 American Cup. Since its inception in 2010, the competition has always been held on the Friday night before the American Cup, in the same arena.

=== Medal winners ===
Event	Gold	Silver	Bronze
Senior
All-around	Haleigh Bryant	Jacey Vore	Andrea Li
Junior
All-around	Kiley Rorich	Alexia Mouyenga	Rachel Wilkening

=== Notable competitors ===
Senior winner, Haleigh Bryant, previously won the Nastia Liukin Cup in 2019. Additionally she was the 2021 NCAA champion on vault and 2024 NCAA all-around champion.

Former elite gymnasts and 2017 City of Jesolo Trophy competitors Olivia Dunne and Gabby Perea competed at the 2020 Nastia Liukin Cup.
