= Nastia Liukin Cup =

Annual artistic gymnastics competition in the United States

The Nastia Liukin Cup (formerly the Nastia Liukin Supergirl Cup from 2010–11) is an annual artistic gymnastics competition held in the United States and hosted by Olympic gymnast Nastia Liukin.

== History ==
In August 2009, USA Gymnastics announced that they had partnered with 2008 Olympic champion Nastia Liukin to create a competitive opportunity for the country's top Junior Olympic gymnasts that is intended to serve as a debut for pre-elite competitors on the national stage. The inaugural Nastia Liukin Cup was held in 2010 and had 36 participants.

Eligible to compete are Level 10 female gymnasts in both the junior and senior fields. Gymnasts will be chosen to participate from a series of invitationals known as the Nastia Liukin Cup Series. Prior to 2014, junior and senior gymnasts competed in the same field.

== Champions ==
Year	Location	Senior Champion	Junior Champion	Ref
2010	Worcester, MA	Lexie Priessman	Not awarded	
2011	Jacksonville, FL	Grace Williams	Not awarded	
2012	New York, NY	Charity Jones	Not awarded	
2013	Worcester, MA	Alex McMurtry	Not awarded	
2014	Greensboro, NC	Mackenzie Brannan McKenna Kelley	Rachael Flam Lauren Ramirez	
2015	Arlington, TX	Kiya Johnson	Maddie Karr	
2016	Newark, NJ	Rachael Lukacs	Andrea Li	
2017	Newark, NJ	Kai Rivers	Carly Bauman	
2018	Hoffman Estates, IL	Haleigh Bryant	Tory Vetter	
2019	Greensboro, NC	Makarri Doggette	Gabrielle Gladieux	
2020	Milwaukee, WI	Haleigh Bryant	Kiley Rorich	
2021	Indianapolis, IN	Leah Smith	Alicia Zhou	
2022	Frisco, TX	Jamison Sears	Kamila Pawlak	
2023	Louisville, KY	Kailin Chio Avery Neff	Addy Fulcher	
2024	Louisville, KY	Elle Mueller	Ella Kate Parker	
2025	Louisville, KY	Mackenzie Estep	Elizaveta Grebenkova Caylee Cain	
2026	Henderson, NV	Josie Lynch	Reagan Murphy	
2027	Duluth, GA			

== Notable former competitors ==
=== Olympians ===
- Lynnzee Brown – 2024 Olympian representing Haiti; 8th in 2017
- Gabby Douglas – 2012 and 2016 Olympic Champion; 4th in 2010
- MyKayla Skinner – 2020 Olympic silver medalist on vault, 2016 Olympic alternate; 7th in 2010, 5th in 2011

=== World Champions ===
- Lavi Crain – 2025 Junior World Champion (vault); 7th in 2023
- Morgan Hurd – 2017 (all-around) and 2018 World Champion (team); 14th in 2014
- Ashton Locklear – 2016 Olympic alternate and 2014 World Champion (team); 7th in 2013
- Maggie Nichols - 2015 World Champion (team), 8x NCAA Champion; 20th in 2011
- Kayla Williams – 2009 World Champion (vault); 4th in 2011
- Lexi Zeiss – 2022 World Champion (team); 4th in 2021

=== NCAA Champions ===
- Sierra Brooks – 2021 NCAA Champion (team); 4th in 2019
- Haleigh Bryant – 3x NCAA Champion (2024 team & all-around, 2021 vault); 1st in 2018 and 2020
- Kailin Chio – 2025 NCAA Champion (vault); 1st in 2023, 15th in 2018
- Georgia Dabritz – 2015 NCAA Champion (uneven bars); 10th in 2011
- Nia Dennis – 2014 Pac Rim Champion, 2018 NCAA Champion (team); 5th in 2012
- Olivia Dunne – 2024 NCAA Champion (team); 11th in 2020
- Ashleigh Gnat – 2017 NCAA Champion (floor); 21st in 2010, 22nd in 2012
- Felicia Hano – 2018 NCAA Champion (team); 25th in 2013
- Kiya Johnson – 2024 NCAA Champion (team); 1st in 2015
- Alex McMurtry – 4x NCAA Champion, 2017 NCAA All-Around Champion; 1st in 2013, 2nd in 2012
- Alyona Shchennikova – 2024 NCAA Champion (team); 17th in 2014
- Faith Torrez – 5x NCAA Champion (2023, 2025 & 2026 team, 2026 all-around, 2024 beam); 3rd in 2018, 7th in 2019 and 2022
- Anastasia Webb – 4x NCAA Champion; 2021 NCAA All-Around Champion; 9th in 2017
- Natalie Wojcik – 2x NCAA Champion (2019 beam, 2021 team); 4th in 2016, 2017, 2018

=== Other ===
- Sloane Blakely – Former national team member (2019), 2x NCAA silver medalist; 13th in 2021
- Kaitlin De Guzman – 2017 Southeast Asian Games Champion (uneven bars) (Philippines) ; 16th in 2014, 11th in 2015
- Emily Gaskins – Former national team member (2013–15); 19th in 2013
- Olivia Greaves – Former national team member (2018–22); 10th in 2018
- Jayla Hang – 2025 Pan American Champion (all-around and team); 9th in 2022
- Gabrielle Hardie – 2025 Pan American Champion (uneven bars and team); 14th in 2022
- Amelia Hundley – 2014 Pan American and 2015 Pan American Games Champion; 2nd in 2011
- McKenna Kelley – 3x NCAA silver medalist (team); 1st in 2014
- Lilly Lippeatt – Former national team member (2019–21); 7th in 2017
- Gabby Perea – Former national team member (2016–19); 6th in 2020
- Lexie Priessman – 2012 Pac Rim Champion, 3x NCAA silver medalist; 2010 NLC Champion
- Emily Schild – 2015 Pan American Games Champion; 19th in 2013
- Kylie Smith – 2025 Junior Pan American Games Champion (team); 5th in 2024
