= Mackenzie Brannan =

American artistic gymnast

- Full name: Mackenzie Eryn Brannan
- Born: May 17, 1996 (age 30) Austin, Texas, U.S.

Gymnastics career
- Discipline: Women's artistic gymnastics
- College team: Alabama Crimson Tide
Medal record
Nastia Liukin Cup
Gold medal – first place	2014 Greensboro	All Around

Mackenzie Eryn Brannan (born May 17, 1996, in Austin, Texas) is a former American artistic gymnast. She won the Senior competition at Nastia Liukin Cup in 2014 in Greensboro, NC with McKenna Kelley. She currently competes in college gymnastics for the Alabama Crimson Tide gymnastics team.

Her college gymnastics debut came in 2015 with her school University of Alabama.
