= Ashley Miles =

American artistic gymnast

Ashley Miles Greig
- Born: March 3, 1985 (age 41)

Gymnastics career
- Discipline: Women's artistic gymnastics
- Country represented: United States; (1997–2003)
- College team: Alabama Crimson Tide (2003–06)
- Gym: Harris Unlimited Gymnastics (HUGS); South Texas Gymnastics Academy (STGA)
- Former coaches: Michael Harris (HUGS); Steven Waples (STGA); Kimberly Waples (STGA); Sarah Patterson (Alabama)
Medal record
Women's gymnastics
Representing the United States
World Championships
Bronze medal – third place	2001 Ghent	Team

Ashley Miles
Biographical details
- Education: University of Alabama

Coaching career (HC unless noted)
- 2024–2026: Iowa State

Ashley Miles Greig (born March 3, 1985) is a retired American artistic gymnast who was most recently the head coach at Iowa State.

She was a member of the U.S. women's artistic gymnastics team at the 2001 World Gymnastics Championships in Ghent, Belgium. The U.S. women won the bronze medal in the team event at 2001 Worlds, and Miles qualified to the vault final, where she finished eighth.

== Elite career ==
A native of San Antonio, Texas, Miles was a member of the U.S. Junior National Team from 1997 to 1998 and 1999–2001, and she was a member of the Senior National Team from 2001 to 2003.

At her first U.S. Junior National Championships in Denver, Colorado in 1997, Miles placed second on vault and 10th all-around.

Miles placed eighth on vault and 21st all-around at 1998 Junior Nationals in Indianapolis, Indiana.

In 1999, she placed second on vault, ninth on balance beam and 12th all-around at 1999 Junior Nationals in Sacramento, California.

She also placed fourth all-around and fifth on beam at the Japan Junior International Championships.

At 2000 Junior Nationals in St. Louis, Missouri, Miles placed third on vault and 13th all-around.

As a first-year senior, Miles was named to the 2001 U.S. World Championship team following her fifth-place finish in the all-around at the 2001 U.S. Senior National Gymnastics Championships in Philadelphia, Pennsylvania, where she also tied for second place on vault and fourth place on uneven bars.

The next year, she placed third on vault and ninth all-around at 2002 Nationals in Cleveland, Ohio.

Miles also won the all-around and balance beam at the 2002 Spring Cup in Toronto, Ontario, Canada, where she placed second on vault and floor exercise. The U.S. women also captured the team title.

As an elite athlete, Miles trained with coaches Michael Harris at Harris Unlimited Gymnastics in Boerne, Texas and with Kimberly and Steve Waples of South Texas Gymnastics Academy.

== Collegiate career ==
Following her elite career, Miles accepted a gymnastics scholarship to the University of Alabama.

During her college career, Miles captured the NCAA national vault titles in 2003, 2004 and 2005, and she won the national floor exercise title in 2004.

Miles was named the National Collegiate Gymnast of the Year for 2006, and she also was a recipient of the Honda Sports Award for top NCAA athletes.

=== Career Perfect 10.0 ===
Season	Date	Event	Meet
2003	March 1, 2003	Vault	Alabama vs. Auburn
2003	April 12, 2003	Floor Exercise	Alabama Regionals
2003	April 24, 2003	Vault	NCAA National Semifinal
2003	April 26, 2003	Vault	NCAA National Event Finals
2004	January 30, 2004	Vault	Alabama vs. Florida
2004	February 13, 2004	Vault	Alabama @ Kentucky
2004	March 20, 2004	Floor Exercise	SEC Championship
2005	January 21, 2005	Vault	Alabama vs. LSU
2005	February 4, 2005	Vault	Alabama vs. Auburn
2005	April 22, 2005	Vault	NCAA Championships Super Six
2005	April 22, 2005	Floor Exercise	NCAA Championships Super Six

== Coaching career ==
On April 26, 2023, Miles was named the head coach of the Iowa State University Women's Gymnastics program. She was the eighth head coach in the program's history. The program was discontinued in 2026.
