= Level 10 (USA Gymnastics) =

Highest level in the USA Gymnastics Junior Olympics Program

Level 10 is the highest level in the USA Gymnastics Junior Olympics Program. The level is open to women's artistic, men's artistic, trampoline, acrobatic and rhythmic gymnasts.

== Age requirements ==
=== Women's Artistic ===
Gymnasts must have reached their 9th birthday to qualify to Level 10.

=== Men's Artistic ===
Male artistic competitors must have reached their 16th birthday to qualify.

=== Rhythmic ===
Level 10 can only be achieved by qualifying for the U.S. National Championship. A rhythmic gymnast may start competing at Level 5 when she has reached her 6th birthday, and Level 6 when she has reached her 7th birthday.

=== Trampoline & Tumbling ===
For T&T gymnasts, there is no age requirement. In Gymnastics they will have an age requirement for levels 2,3.

=== Acrobatic ===
There is no age requirement for acrobatic gymnasts.

== Competitions ==
Competitions, or "meets," as they are known, are held throughout the year but primarily during the Level 10 artistic season, which is from January to April. Clubs usually host a meet through those months on behalf of their Booster Club.

=== Women's & Men's Artistic ===
Regular competitions that are hosted throughout the Level 10 season include the following;

WA and MA Artistic Schedule
Name of Meet	Usual Date	Location	Gender	Type
Nastia Liukin Cup Qualification Invitationals	January–February	Various locations	Female	Qualifier to NLC
Nastia Liukin Cup	February	Changes per year	Female	National, invitation only
State Championships	March	Various locations	Female	State
Regional Championships	April	Various locations	Female	Regional, qualifier to Nationals
J.O. Nationals	May	Changes per year	Male, Female	National, invitation only
J.O. National Invitational	May	Changes per year	Female	National, invitation only

=== Rhythmic ===
Regular Rhythmic competitions include;

Rhythmic Artistic Schedule
Name of Meet	Usual Date	Location	Type
Rhythmic Invitational	February	Colorado Springs	National
Stars and Stripes Cup	May	Changes per year	National
U.S. National Championships	June or July	Changes per year	National, invitation only

=== Acro ===
Regular acrobatic competitions include;

Acro Artistic Schedule
Name of Meet	Usual Date	Location	Type
Acro Cup	Varies	Changes per year	National
U.S. Nationals	July	Changes per year	National

=== Trampoline ===
Regular Trampoline competitions include;

T&T Artistic Schedule
Name of Meet	Usual Date	Location	Type
Stars & Stripes Cup	Varies	Changes per year	National, invitation only
U.S. National Championships	Varies	Changes per year	National, invitation only
Camp Wakeshma	August	Three Rivers, Michigan	National

== J.O. Nationals ==
The Junior Olympic National Championships and Junior Olympic National Invitational Tournament are the highest levels of competition in the women's and men's artistic program. The highest level of competition is the J.O. Nationals. Gymnasts qualify to the competitions through their Regional Championships. There are eight age divisions (Junior A-D and Senior A-D), and the youngest age of qualification is 9 years old.

Gymnasts compete for their region and are eligible to win individual all-around and event titles, as well as team medals.

== Notable Level 10 Gymnasts ==
Here is a list of Notable Level 10 gymnasts.

=== Women's Artistic ===
- Mackenzie Brannan – 2014 Nastia Liukin Cup co-champion
- Haleigh Bryant – 2024 NCAA champion, 2x Nastia Liukin Cup champion (2018, 2020)
- Kacy Catanzaro – Towson Tigers gymnast (2009–12), American Ninja Warrior
- McKenna Kelley – 2014 Nastia Liukin Cup co-champion
- Alex McMurtry – 2017 NCAA champion, 2013 Nastia Liukin Cup champion
