= Kiya Johnson =

American artistic gymnast

- Born: February 27, 2002 (age 24) Dallas, Texas, U.S.
- Height: 5 ft 2 in (157 cm)

Gymnastics career
- Discipline: Women's artistic gymnastics
- College team: LSU Tigers (2020–24)
- Club: Texas Dreams Gymnastics
- Head coach: Jay Clark
- Assistant coach: Ashleigh Gnat
- Former coach: Kim Zmeskal-Burdette
- Choreographer: Courtney McCool Griffeth
Medal record
Representing Texas Dreams
Nastia Liukin Cup
Gold medal – first place	2015 Arlington	All-Around (Jr.)
Bronze medal – third place	2019 Greensboro	All-Around
Representing Louisiana State Tigers
NCAA Championships
Gold medal – first place	2024 Fort Worth	Team

Kiya Johnson (born February 27, 2002) is an American artistic gymnast. She currently competes for the LSU Tigers gymnastics team.

== Early life ==
Johnson was born on February 27, 2002, in Dallas, Texas, to Carl and Kyesha Johnson. She grew up in Coppell, Texas, where she attended Coppell High School, graduating a year early in 2019.

== Level 10 career ==
Johnson trained at Texas Dreams Gymnastics under coaches Kim Zmeskal Burdette and Chris Burdette. She was the junior Nastia Liukin Cup all-around, vault, and beam champion in 2015; she earned 2nd place on the vault and 5th place in the all-around at the Junior Olympic National Championships that same year.

In 2016, Johnson briefly trained as a junior elite gymnast; she earned a berth to the Secret U.S. Classic, placing 17th in the all-around and tying for 7th place on floor exercise.

Johnson returned to level 10 competition for the 2018 season. She placed 5th in the all-around at the Nastia Liukin Cup. She tied for first place in the all-around and won the floor exercise title at the J.O. National Championships.

In 2019, Johnson earned the bronze medal in the all-around at the Nastia Liukin Cup, and successfully defended her J.O. National Championship all-around and floor exercise titles, adding another title on the balance beam.

== College career ==
=== 2020 ===
Johnson began competing for the LSU Tigers gymnastics team in the 2020 season. She competed all-around in 9 of 11 meets. On January 24, she earned her first career perfect 10 on the balance beam at Florida, and on February 14 added a perfect 10 on the vault at the GymQuarters invitational. She also posted season-high scores of 9.95 on the uneven bars, 9.975 on the floor exercise, and 39.75 in the all-around. She was named SEC Freshman of the Week for four consecutive weeks beginning in January, and also earned the SEC Gymnast of the Week honor following an all-around win against Auburn on January 17.

At the conclusion of the (prematurely terminated) season, Johnson was named the SEC Freshman of the Year. She also earned first team All-America honors on vault, floor exercise, and the all-around.

=== 2021 ===
On January 8, Johnson earned her third career perfect 10 on floor exercise in a meet against Arkansas. On March 5, she scored another perfect 10 on the event against Missouri. At the SEC Championships, Jonnson scored her third perfect 10 of the season on floor exercise, winning the SEC title on the event. She also placed second in the all-around behind Luisa Blanco of Alabama. During the NCAA Championship semifinals, Johnson competed in the all-around, however LSU failed to advance to the final. At the conclusion of the season, Johnson was named SEC Specialist of the Year.

=== 2022 ===
On February 5, Johnson scored her sixth career perfect 10 on floor exercise against Auburn. On February 18, she scored another perfect 10 on the balance beam against Alabama. At the NCAA regional semifinals, she contributed scores on all four events, however LSU suffered two uncharacteristic falls on balance beam and as a result was eliminated from the postseason during the first round of regionals, failing to qualify for the national championship as a team. Johnson qualified for the NCAA Championships as an individual competitor on vault. She finished sixth on the event with a score of 9.9125.

=== 2023 ===
During the second meet of the 2023 season, Johnson suffered an Achilles tendon rupture on floor exercise, which ruled her out for the remainder of the season.

=== 2024 ===
Johnson returned for the 2024 season for her fifth year of eligibility. On January 19, she scored a perfect 10 on floor exercise in a meet against Kentucky, one year after she tore her Achilles competing on the same event against the same team. At the SEC Championships, Johnson competed in the all-around, helping LSU win the SEC conference title. She also tied for the SEC floor exercise title with Kentucky's Raena Worley and teammate KJ Johnson, all posting 9.975s. During the NCAA Championships, Johnson once again competed in the all-around, helping LSU win their first national championship title in program history.

==== Competitive history ====
Year	Event	Team	AA	VT	UB	BB	FX
2021	SEC Championships	2nd place, silver medalist(s)	2nd place, silver medalist(s)	15	8	7	1st place, gold medalist(s)
2021	NCAA Championships	SF	8	4	32	17	20
2022	SEC Championships	5	13	8	47	9	8
2022	NCAA Championships			6			
2024	SEC Championships	1st place, gold medalist(s)	8	2nd place, silver medalist(s)	36	39	1st place, gold medalist(s)
2024	NCAA Championships	1st place, gold medalist(s)	7	17	18	19	10

==== Career perfect 10.0 ====
Season	Date	Event	Meet
2020	January 24, 2020	Balance beam	LSU vs Florida
2020	February 14, 2020	Vault	GymQuarters Invite
2021	January 8, 2021	Floor exercise	LSU vs Arkansas
2021	March 5, 2021	Floor exercise	LSU vs Missouri
2021	March 20, 2021	Floor exercise	SEC Championships
2022	February 5, 2022	Floor exercise	LSU vs Auburn
2022	February 18, 2022	Balance beam	LSU vs Alabama
2024	January 19, 2024	Floor exercise	LSU vs Kentucky
