= 2025 NCAA women's gymnastics tournament =

Collegiate gymnastics competition

- Venue: Dickies Arena (semi-finals and final)
- Location: Fort Worth, Texas
- Dates: April 2 - April 19
- Teams: 36
- Winning score: 198.0125

Medalists
gold medal	Oklahoma
silver medal	UCLA
bronze medal	Missouri

The 2025 NCAA women's gymnastics tournament was the 42nd NCAA women's gymnastics tournament, the annual women's gymnastics championship contested by the teams of the member associations of NCAA. The first and second round and regional final were hosted on campuses from April 2 to April 6, 2025, while the semi-final and final were held at Dickies Arena in Fort Worth, Texas from April 17 to April 19, 2025.

== Format ==
The eight lowest seeded teams competed in the first round. Winners advanced to the second round, with 32 total teams at four regional sites. The top two teams from each region moved on to the semi-finals in Fort Worth, Texas. The top two teams in each semi-final advanced to the "Four on the Floor" for the team national title.

== Bracket ==
First round
April 2 – University Park
Maryland	196.250
West Virginia	195.325
April 2 – Salt Lake City
BYU	195.950
Utah State	194.475
April 3 – Seattle
Illinois	195.475
UC Davis	194.050
April 3 – Tuscaloosa
Clemson	195.400
Rutgers	193.875

Second round
April 4 – University Park
#8 Michigan State #9 Kentucky	197.625 197.525
Ohio State Penn State	196.400 196.225
April 4 – University Park
#1 LSU #16 Arkansas	198.100 197.550
Michigan Maryland	197.050 196.825
April 3 – Salt Lake City
#5 UCLA #10 Minnesota	197.750 197.200
Southern Utah Boise State	196.475 195.175
April 3 – Salt Lake City
#4 Utah #13 Stanford	197.650 196.500
Denver BYU	197.650 196.000
April 4 – Seattle
#7 Missouri #12 Georgia	197.650 196.175
Arizona Arizona State	196.250 196.050
April 4 – Seattle
#2 Oklahoma #15 Auburn	198.025 196.950
Nebraska Illinois	195.675 195.725
April 4 – Tuscaloosa
#6 California #11 Alabama	197.550 197.275
North Carolina Iowa	196.250 196.000
April 4 – Tuscaloosa
#3 Florida #14 Oregon State	198.225 197.050
NC State Clemson	196.275 195.875

Regional final
April 5 – University Park
#8 Michigan State #9 Kentucky	198.000 197.625
#1 LSU #16 Arkansas	198.050 197.375
April 5 – Salt Lake City
#5 UCLA #10 Minnesota	197.625 196.825
#4 Utah Denver	197.825 197.350
April 6 – Seattle
#7 Missouri Arizona	197.425 196.250
#2 Oklahoma #15 Auburn	198.450 197.325
April 6 – Tuscaloosa
#6 California #11 Alabama	197.575 197.675
#3 Florida #14 Oregon State	197.700 196.825

Semi-finals
April 17 – Fort Worth
#1 LSU #4 Utah	197.5250 197.7625
#5 UCLA #8 Michigan State	197.7375 197.3625
April 17 – Fort Worth
#2 Oklahoma #3 Florida	197.550 197.200
#7 Missouri #11 Alabama	197.300 196.825

Final
April 19 – Fort Worth
#2 Oklahoma #4 Utah	198.0125 197.2375
#5 UCLA #7 Missouri	197.6125 197.2500

== Individual qualifiers ==
2025 NCAA women's gymnastics tournament individual qualifiers
All-around	Vault	Uneven bars	Balance beam	Floor exercise
Joscelyn Roberson (Arkansas)	Sophia Diaz (Michigan)	Maddie Jones (Arkansas)	Isabella Magnelli (Kentucky)	Creslyn Brose (Kentucky)
Madison Ulrich (Denver)	Rosie Casali (Denver)	Rylie Mundell (Denver)	Brynlee Anderson (BYU)	Mya Hooten (Minnesota)
Jade Carey (Oregon State)	Kaya Forbes (UNC)	Madelyn Williams (Cal)	Mya Lauzon (Cal)	Mya Lauzon (Cal)
Mary McDonough (Washington)	Ady Wahl (Georgia)	Olivia Greaves (Auburn)	Gabby McLaughlin (Auburn)	Lily Smith (Georgia)

== Regional results ==
=== University Park Regional ===
First round

Seed	School	Vault	Bars	Beam	Floor	Overall
–	Maryland	48.850	49.150	49.100	49.250	196.250
–	West Virginia	48.700	48.550	49.025	49.050	195.325

Session 1 (Round 2)

Seed	School	Vault	Bars	Beam	Floor	Overall
8	Michigan State	49.525	49.450	49.250	49.400	197.625
9	Kentucky	49.350	49.425	49.350	49.400	197.525
–	Ohio State	49.225	49.000	49.075	49.100	196.400
–	Penn State	48.950	48.975	49.150	49.150	196.225

Session 2 (Round 2)

Seed	School	Vault	Bars	Beam	Floor	Overall
1	LSU	49.500	49.525	49.525	49.550	198.100
16	Arkansas	49.425	49.525	49.125	49.475	197.550
–	Michigan	49.325	49.275	49.075	49.375	197.050
−	Maryland	49.225	49.200	49.075	49.325	196.825

Regional Final

Seed	School	Vault	Bars	Beam	Floor	Overall
1	LSU	49.350	49.450	49.675	49.575	198.050
8	Michigan State	49.650	49.575	49.350	49.425	198.000
9	Kentucky	49.250	49.450	49.525	49.400	197.625
16	Arkansas	49.225	49.250	49.400	49.500	197.375

=== Salt Lake City Regional ===
First round

Seed	School	Vault	Bars	Beam	Floor	Overall
–	BYU	48.950	48.950	49.075	48.975	195.950
–	Utah State	48.825	48.950	48.700	48.000	194.475

Session 1 (Round 2)

Seed	School	Vault	Bars	Beam	Floor	Overall
5	UCLA	49.450	49.300	49.500	49.500	197.750
12	Minnesota	49.150	49.375	49.325	49.350	197.200
–	Southern Utah	49.100	49.075	49.100	49.200	196.475
–	Boise State	49.075	48.625	48.700	48.775	195.175

Session 2 (Round 2)

Seed	School	Vault	Bars	Beam	Floor	Overall
4	Utah	49.400	49.500	49.175	49.575	197.650
−	Denver	49.500	49.400	49.400	49.350	197.650
13	Stanford	49.250	49.300	48.600	49.350	196.500
–	BYU	49.125	48.550	49.150	49.175	196.000

Regional Final

Seed	School	Vault	Bars	Beam	Floor	Overall
4	Utah	49.375	49.425	49.400	49.625	197.825
5	UCLA	49.475	49.275	49.425	49.450	197.625
−	Denver	48.900	49.400	49.550	49.500	197.350
12	Minnesota	49.125	49.175	49.350	49.200	196.825

=== Seattle Regional ===
First round

Seed	School	Vault	Bars	Beam	Floor	Overall
–	Illinois	48.700	49.175	48.800	48.800	195.475
–	UC Davis	48.525	48.025	48.400	49.100	194.050

Session 1 (Round 2)

Seed	School	Vault	Bars	Beam	Floor	Overall
7	Missouri	49.225	49.550	49.575	49.300	197.650
–	Arizona	48.975	48.975	49.025	49.275	196.250
10	Georgia	49.250	49.175	48.350	49.400	196.175
–	Arizona State	48.750	49.125	49.225	48.950	196.050

Session 2 (Round 2)

Seed	School	Vault	Bars	Beam	Floor	Overall
2	Oklahoma	49.175	49.525	49.700	49.625	198.025
15	Auburn	49.075	49.225	49.325	49.325	196.950
–	Nebraska	48.900	49.300	48.325	49.150	195.725
–	Illinois	48.900	48.875	48.950	49.000	195.675

Regional Final

Seed	School	Vault	Bars	Beam	Floor	Overall
2	Oklahoma	49.475	49.650	49.525	49.800	198.450
7	Missouri	49.300	49.300	49.275	49.550	197.425
15	Auburn	49.450	49.275	49.225	49.375	197.325
–	Arizona	48.900	49.200	48.850	49.300	196.250

=== Tuscaloosa Regional ===
First round

Seed	School	Vault	Bars	Beam	Floor	Overall
–	Clemson	48.600	48.725	48.800	49.275	195.400
–	Rutgers	48.725	48.675	47.425	49.050	193.875

Session 1 (Round 2)

Seed	School	Vault	Bars	Beam	Floor	Overall
6	Cal	49.150	49.450	49.475	49.475	197.550
11	Alabama	49.150	49.300	49.225	49.600	197.275
–	North Carolina	49.125	48.900	49.325	48.900	196.275
–	Iowa	48.850	48.875	49.100	49.175	196.000

Session 2 (Round 2)

Seed	School	Vault	Bars	Beam	Floor	Overall
3	Florida	49.500	49.575	49.575	49.575	198.225
14	Oregon State	48.975	49.175	49.375	49.525	197.050
–	NC State	49.100	48.850	49.200	49.125	196.275
–	Clemson	48.575	48.900	49.325	49.075	195.875

Regional Final

Seed	School	Vault	Bars	Beam	Floor	Overall
3	Florida	49.350	49.550	49.300	49.500	197.700
11	Alabama	49.175	49.475	49.500	49.525	197.675
6	Cal	49.300	49.450	49.450	49.375	197.575
13	Oregon State	49.100	49.300	49.000	49.475	196.875

== NCAA championship ==
=== Semi-finals ===
The top two teams from each semifinal advanced to the National Championship, which was televised live on ABC on April 19 at 4:00 pm ET.

Semifinal I - April 17 at 4:30 PM ET
Seed	School	Vault	Bars	Beam	Floor	Total
2	Oklahoma	49.2750	49.4000	49.3500	49.5250	197.5500
7	Missouri	49.1250	49.4500	49.5000	49.2225	197.3000
3	Florida	49.0750	49.4750	49.3000	49.3500	197.2000
11	Alabama	49.1250	49.1625	49.2000	49.3375	196.8250

Semifinal II - April 17 at 9 PM ET
Seed	School	Vault	Bars	Beam	Floor	Total
4	Utah	49.3375	49.6500	49.2125	49.5625	197.7625
5	UCLA	49.2375	49.4250	49.5500	49.5250	197.7375
1	LSU	49.3750	49.3250	49.3250	49.5000	197.5250
8	Michigan State	49.3875	49.4500	49.1625	49.3625	197.3625

=== Final ===
Rank	Team	Vault (gymnastics)	Uneven bars	Balance beam	Floor (gymnastics)	Total
1st place, gold medalist(s)	Oklahoma	49.4375	49.3750	49.6125	49.5875	198.0125
1st place, gold medalist(s)	Audrey Davis		9.9250	9.9000	9.8875	
1st place, gold medalist(s)	Addison Fatta	9.9250	9.8375	9.9000	9.8500	39.5125
1st place, gold medalist(s)	Lily Pederson	9.8625	9.8000	9.9375		
1st place, gold medalist(s)	Jordan Bowers	9.7375	9.8875	9.9375	9.9250	39.4875
1st place, gold medalist(s)	Keira Wells	9.9000		9.8500		
1st place, gold medalist(s)	Faith Torrez	9.9375	9.8500	9.9375	9.9625	39.6875
1st place, gold medalist(s)	Danielle Sievers		9.8750		9.9125	
1st place, gold medalist(s)	Elle Mueller	9.8125			9.9000	
2nd place, silver medalist(s)	UCLA	49.2875	49.4000	49.3125	49.6125	197.6125
2nd place, silver medalist(s)	Katelyn Rosen		9.8625	9.7250	9.8875	
2nd place, silver medalist(s)	Macy McGowan	9.8375	9.8250		9.8875	
2nd place, silver medalist(s)	Emma Malabuyo		9.8875	9.9375	9.8750	
2nd place, silver medalist(s)	Chae Campbell	9.9000	9.8625	9.6875	9.9250	39.3750
2nd place, silver medalist(s)	Brooklyn Moors	9.8250			9.9375	
2nd place, silver medalist(s)	Jordan Chiles	9.9000	9.9625	9.9375	9.9750	39.7750
2nd place, silver medalist(s)	Emily Lee	9.8250		9.9250		
2nd place, silver medalist(s)	Riley Jenkins	9.8250				
2nd place, silver medalist(s)	Frida Esparza		9.7625			
2nd place, silver medalist(s)	Ciena Alipio			9.7875		
(bronze) ^{a}	Missouri	49.2000	49.1750	49.3875	49.4875	197.2500
(bronze) ^{a}	Amari Celestine	9.9000	9.8625	9.8625	9.9125	39.5375
(bronze) ^{a}	Jocelyn Moore	9.8500	9.8500		9.9000	
(bronze) ^{a}	Hannah Horton	9.8375	9.7875		9.8375	
(bronze) ^{a}	Kaia Tanskanen	9.8125			9.8875	
(bronze) ^{a}	Elise Tisler	9.8000				
(bronze) ^{a}	Kennedy Griffin	9.7750			9.9500	
(bronze) ^{a}	Mara Titarsolej		9.8500			
(bronze) ^{a}	Kyra Burns		9.8250			
(bronze) ^{a}	Olivia Kelly		9.7750	9.8125		
(bronze) ^{a}	Helen Hu			9.9625		
(bronze) ^{a}	Railey Jackson			9.8625		
(bronze) ^{a}	Amy Wier			9.8500		
(bronze) ^{a}	Addison Lawrence			9.8500		
(bronze) ^{a}	Rayna Light				9.7625	
4	Utah	49.1250	49.4500	49.1875	49.4750	197.2375
4	Makenna Smith	9.8500	9.8875	9.8750	9.8875	39.5000
4	Ashley Glynn	9.7000	9.6875		9.8750	
4	Avery Neff	9.9750	9.8250	9.8500	9.9125	39.5625
4	Amelie Morgan		9.8750	9.6875		
4	Ella Zirbes		9.9125		9.9000	
4	Grace McCallum	9.8250	9.9500	9.2875	9.7875	38.8500
4	Ana Padurariu			9.9000		
4	Elizabeth Gantner			9.8750		
4	Jaylene Gilstrap	9.7750			9.9000	
4	Zoe Johnson	8.7500				

^aMissouri was originally awarded fourth place, but after an inquiry into Amy Weir's score on beam, Missouri's team score increased enough to raise them to third place.

== Individual results ==
=== Medalists ===
Event	Gold	Silver	Bronze
Individual all-around	Jordan Bowers (Oklahoma)	Grace McCallum (Utah)	Faith Torrez (Oklahoma)
Vault	Kailin Chio (LSU)	Grace McCallum (Utah) Sage Kellerman (Michigan St)	Not awarded
Uneven bars	Jordan Chiles (UCLA)	Grace McCallum (Utah)	Leanne Wong (Florida) Mara Titarsolej (Missouri) Jordan Bowers (Oklahoma) Alyssa Arana (Florida) Gabrielle Stephen (Michigan State) Ella Zirbes (Utah)
Balance beam	Helen Hu (Missouri)	Emma Malabuyo (UCLA)	Selena Harris-Miranda (Florida) Faith Torrez (Oklahoma) Mya Lauzon (Cal) Jade Carey (Oregon St) Ciena Alipio (UCLA)
Floor	Brooklyn Moors (UCLA)	Faith Torrez (Oklahoma) Jordan Bowers (Oklahoma) Grace McCallum (Utah)	Not awarded

=== All-around ===
Rank	Gymnast	Vault (gymnastics)	Uneven bars	Balance beam	Floor (gymnastics)	Total
1st place, gold medalist(s)	Jordan Bowers (Oklahoma)	9.8875	9.9375	9.9375	9.9500	39.7125
2nd place, silver medalist(s)	Grace McCallum (Utah)	9.9500	9.9625	9.8125	9.9500	39.6750
3rd place, bronze medalist(s)	Faith Torrez (Oklahoma)	9.8500	9.8875	9.9500	9.9500	39.6375
4	Jade Carey (Oregon St)	9.8500	9.9125	9.9500	9.9125	39.6250
5	Jordan Chiles (UCLA)	9.8875	9.9750	9.8250	9.9000	39.5875
6	Haleigh Bryant (LSU)	9.9000	9.8750	9.8750	9.9125	39.5625
6	Kailin Chio (LSU)	9.9750	9.8250	9.8750	9.8875	39.5625
6	Avery Neff (Utah)	9.8500	9.9250	9.9125	9.8750	39.5625
9	Chae Campbell (UCLA)	9.9000	9.8250	9.9125	9.9125	39.5500
10	Makenna Smith (Utah)	9.8500	9.9125	9.8500	9.9125	39.5250
11	Gabrielle Stephen (Michigan St)	9.8375	9.9375	9.8250	9.8625	39.4625
11	Selena Harris-Miranda (Florida)	9.7500	9.8750	9.9500	9.8875	39.4625
13	Joscelyn Roberson (Arkansas)	9.8250	9.8000	9.9000	9.9000	39.4250
14	Addison Fatta (Oklahoma)	9.8375	9.8375	9.8625	9.8750	39.4125
14	Gabby Gladieux (Alabama)	9.8500	9.7750	9.9000	9.8875	39.4125
16	Amari Celestine (Missouri)	9.8125	9.8750	9.8125	9.8250	39.3250
16	Madison Ulrich (Denver)	9.7000	9.8875	9.8875	9.8500	39.3250
18	Leanne Wong (Florida)	9.8375	9.9375	9.8000	9.6625	39.2375
19	Lilly Hudson (Alabama)	9.8250	9.6875	9.7625	9.9250	39.2000
20	Aleah Finnegan (LSU)	9.8500	9.8500	9.2250	9.9375	38.8625
21	Mary McDonough (Washington)	9.8125	9.8375	9.6000	9.0250	38.2750
