= Faith Torrez =

American artistic gymnast (born 2003)

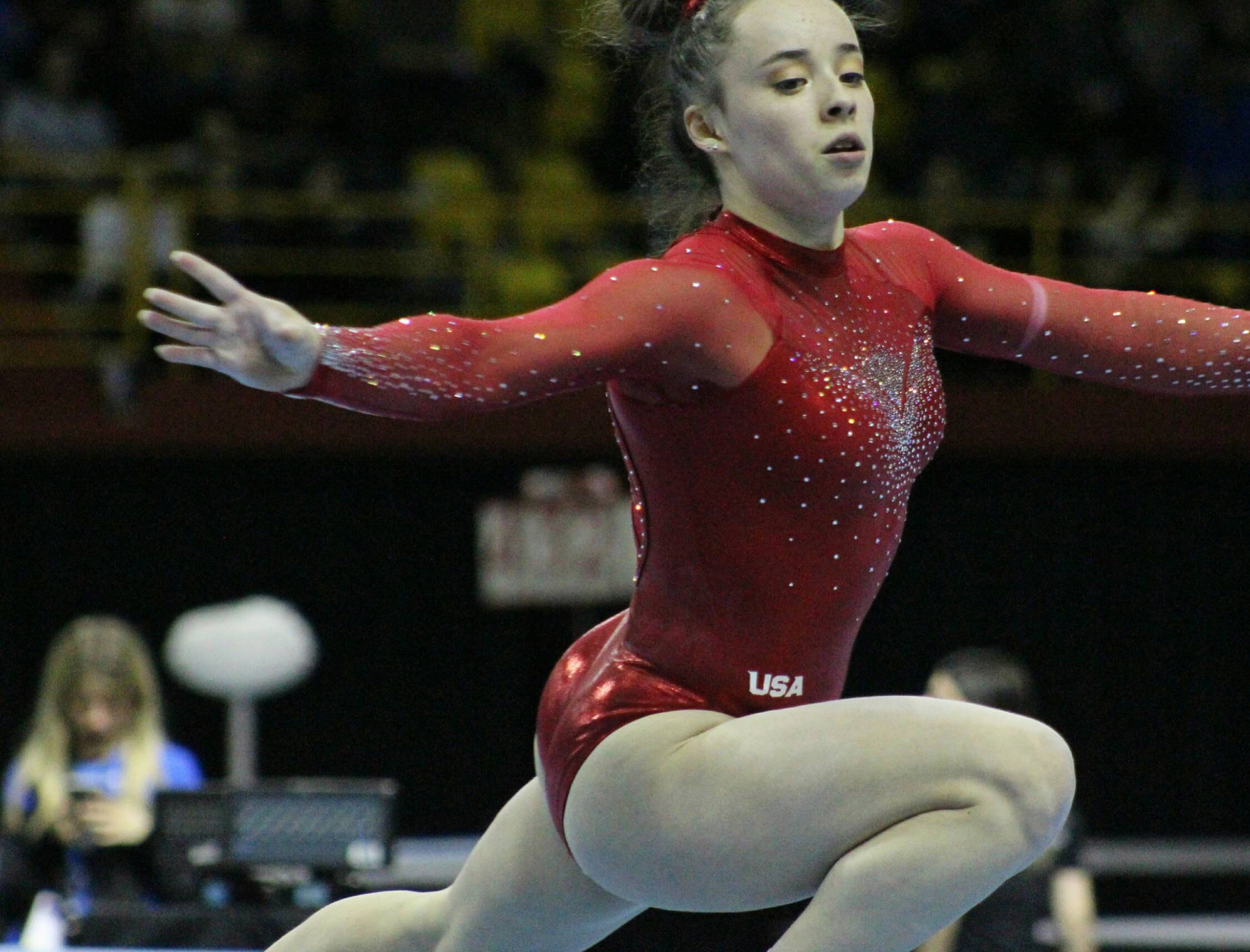
- Torrez in 2020

Personal information
- Born: December 9, 2003 (age 22) Libertyville, Illinois, U.S.

Gymnastics career
- Discipline: Women's artistic gymnastics
- Country represented: United States (2020–2021)
- College team: Oklahoma Sooners (2023–2026)
- Club: Legacy Elite Gymnastics LLC
- Head coach: Jiani Wu
- Assistant coaches: Yuejiu Li, Anna Li
Medal record
Representing Oklahoma Sooners
NCAA Championships
| Gold medal – first place | 2023 Fort Worth | Team |
| Gold medal – first place | 2024 Fort Worth | Balance Beam |
| Gold medal – first place | 2025 Fort Worth | Team |
| Gold medal – first place | 2026 Fort Worth | Team |
| Gold medal – first place | 2026 Fort Worth | All-Around |
| Silver medal – second place | 2024 Fort Worth | Floor Exercise |
| Silver medal – second place | 2025 Fort Worth | Floor Exercise |
| Silver medal – second place | 2026 Fort Worth | Balance Beam |
| Bronze medal – third place | 2025 Fort Worth | All-Around |
| Bronze medal – third place | 2025 Fort Worth | Balance Beam |
| Bronze medal – third place | 2026 Fort Worth | Floor Exercise |

Faith Torrez (born December 9, 2003) is an American artistic gymnast. She was a member of the United States national team from 2020–2021 and competed for the Oklahoma Sooners from 2023–2026. She is the 2026 NCAA all-around champion and is a 5-time NCAA champion and 11-time NCAA medalist.

== Gymnastics career ==
=== Junior ===
Torrez began gymnastics in 2008. As a junior, she competed at the Women's Junior Olympic National Championships in 2016, 2017, and 2018. She won gold on floor exercise in 2017. In 2018, she won all-around and balance beam gold, as well as floor exercise silver. In 2018, she competed at the Nastia Liukin Cup for the first time and won all-around bronze. She was the top scorer on floor with 9.600; her highest score of the competition was a 9.675 on vault.

=== Senior ===
Torrez became a senior in 2019. She competed at the Nastia Liukin Cup in March, finishing seventh all-around. At the American Classic in June, Torrez won all-around gold, finishing first on vault, second on uneven bars and floor exercise, and third on balance beam. In July at the GK US Classic, she finished sixth on balance beam and eighth all-around. At the US Gymnastics Championships in August, Torrez finished 14th all-around.

Torrez was added to the senior national team on March 3, 2020. She made her international debut on March 6–8 at Gymnix International. With teammates Lilly Lippeatt, MyKayla Skinner and Emily Lee, she won team gold. Individually, she captured balance beam gold with a score of 13.966 and uneven bars bronze with a score of 12.966.

== Collegiate gymnastics career ==
=== 2022–2023 season ===
Torrez made her collegiate debut for the Oklahoma Sooners on January 7, 2023 at the Super 16 Invitational. She competed on three events, the uneven bars (9.875), balance beam (9.900), and floor exercise (9.950). Her scores helped contribute towards Oklahoma's first place finish. Additionally she co-won the title on floor exercise. As a result she was named Big-12 newcomer of the week.

=== 2023–2024 season ===
At Big 12 Championships, Torrez scored her first perfect 10, helping the Sooners win the team title and winning floor exercise. Although the Sooners did not make it to the finals of the NCAA women's gymnastics tournament, Torrez was co-champion on balance beam with teammate Audrey Davis and runner-up on floor exercise behind LSU's Aleah Finnegan.

=== 2024–2025 season ===
Torrez earned her second perfect 10 on floor exercise during Oklahoma's first appearance at SEC Championships, helping Oklahoma to second place in the team competition. She won the floor exercise title and a share of the balance beam title. During the NCAA tournament, she earned two more perfect 10s, one on balance beam and the other on floor exercise. During the final, she competed in the all-around, helping the Oklahoma Sooners defeat the UCLA Bruins and winning the 2025 team title. She was South Central Region Gymnast of the year and earned WCGA All-America honors in the all-around and all four events.

=== Career perfect 10.0 ===
| Season | Date | Event | Meet |
|---|---|---|---|
| 2024 | March 23, 2024 | Floor exercise | Big 12 Championships |
| 2025 | March 22, 2025 | Floor exercise | SEC Championships |
| 2025 | April 4, 2025 | Balance beam | Washington Regional Semifinal |
| 2025 | April 6, 2025 | Floor exercise | Washington Regional Final |
| 2026 | March 21, 2026 | Balance beam | SEC Championships |
| 2026 | April 5, 2026 | Balance beam | Lexington Super Regional Final |

=== Regular season rankings ===
| Season | All-Around | Vault | Uneven Bars | Balance Beam | Floor Exercise |
|---|---|---|---|---|---|
| 2023 | N/A | N/A | 75th | 30th | 8th |
| 2024 | 11th | 18th | 47th | 4th | 14th |
| 2025 | 2nd | 3rd | 16th | 3rd | 1st |
| 2026 | N/A | N/A | 29th | 3rd | N/A |

== Competitive History ==
Competitive history of Faith Torrez
| Year | Event | Team | AA | VT | UB | BB | FX |
Junior
| 2016 | J.O. National Championships | | 4 | 10 | 37 | 4 | 5 |
| 2017 | J.O. National Championships | | 5 | 6 | 15 | 21 | 1st place, gold medalist(s) |
| 2018 | Nastia Liukin Cup | | 3rd place, bronze medalist(s) | 4 | 15 | 2nd place, silver medalist(s) | 1st place, gold medalist(s) |
| 2018 | J.O. National Championships | | 1st place, gold medalist(s) | 5 | 1st place, gold medalist(s) | 1st place, gold medalist(s) | 2nd place, silver medalist(s) |
Senior
| 2019 | Nastia Liukin Cup | | 7 | 12 | 9 | 3rd place, bronze medalist(s) | 5 |
| 2019 | J.O. National Championships | | 1st place, gold medalist(s) | 15 | 11 | 1st place, gold medalist(s) | 3rd place, bronze medalist(s) |
| 2019 | American Classic | | 1st place, gold medalist(s) | 1st place, gold medalist(s) | 2nd place, silver medalist(s) | 3rd place, bronze medalist(s) | 2nd place, silver medalist(s) |
| 2019 | U.S. Classic | | 8 | | 13 | 6 | 8 |
| 2019 | U.S. National Championships | | 14 | | 16 | 7 | 11 |
| 2019 | Worlds Team Selection Camp | | 7 | 4 | 6 | 13 | 7 |
| 2020 | International Gymnix | 1st place, gold medalist(s) | | | 3rd place, bronze medalist(s) | 1st place, gold medalist(s) | |
| 2021 | American Classic | | 7 | 6 | 15 | 6 | 6 |
| 2022 | Nastia Liukin Cup | | 7 | | | | |
| 2022 | L10 National Championships | | 1st place, gold medalist(s) | | | 1st place, gold medalist(s) | |
NCAA
| 2023 | Big-12 Championships | 1st place, gold medalist(s) | | | | 2nd place, silver medalist(s) | 1st place, gold medalist(s) |
| 2023 | NCAA Championships | 1st place, gold medalist(s) | | | | | |
| 2024 | Big-12 Championships | 1st place, gold medalist(s) | 2nd place, silver medalist(s) | 3rd place, bronze medalist(s) | 14 | 2nd place, silver medalist(s) | 1st place, gold medalist(s) |
| 2024 | NCAA Championships | 6 | | | | 1st place, gold medalist(s) | 2nd place, silver medalist(s) |
| 2025 | SEC Championships | 2nd place, silver medalist(s) | 5 | 16 | 40 | 1st place, gold medalist(s) | 1st place, gold medalist(s) |
| 2025 | NCAA Championships | 1st place, gold medalist(s) | 3rd place, bronze medalist(s) | 14 | 20 | 3rd place, bronze medalist(s) | 2nd place, silver medalist(s) |
| 2026 | SEC Championships | 2nd place, silver medalist(s) | | | 4 | 1st place, gold medalist(s) | |
| 2026 | NCAA Championships | 1st place, gold medalist(s) | 1st place, gold medalist(s) | 6 | 5 | 2nd place, silver medalist(s) | 3rd place, bronze medalist(s) |
