= Alabama Crimson Tide women's gymnastics =

Women's gymnastics program at the University of Alabama

Alabama Crimson Tide
- Founded: 1975
- University: University of Alabama
- Head coach: Ashley Priess-Johnston (5th season)
- Conference: SEC
- Location: Tuscaloosa, Alabama
- Home arena: Coleman Coliseum (Capacity: 15,075)
- Nickname: Crimson Tide
- Colors: Crimson and white

National championships
- 6; 1988, 1991, 1996, 2002, 2011, 2012

Super Six appearances
- 33; 1983, 1984, 1985, 1986, 1987, 1988, 1989, 1990, 1991, 1992, 1993, 1994, 1995, 1996, 1998, 1999, 2000, 2001, 2002, 2003, 2004, 2005, 2006, 2008, 2009, 2010, 2011, 2012, 2013, 2014, 2015, 2016, 2017

NCAA Regional championships
- 32; 1983, 1984, 1985, 1987, 1988, 1989, 1990, 1991, 1992, 1993, 1994, 1995, 1996, 1998, 1999, 2000, 2001, 2002, 2003, 2005, 2006, 2007, 2008, 2009, 2010, 2011, 2012, 2013, 2014, 2015, 2016, 2018

NCAA Tournament appearances
- 39; 1983, 1984, 1985, 1986, 1987, 1988, 1989, 1990, 1991, 1992, 1993, 1994, 1995, 1996, 1997, 1998, 1999, 2000, 2001, 2002, 2003, 2004, 2005, 2006, 2007, 2008, 2009, 2010, 2011, 2012, 2013, 2014, 2015, 2016, 2017, 2018, 2019, 2021, 2022

Conference championships
- 10; 1988, 1990, 1995, 2000, 2003, 2009, 2011, 2014, 2015, 2021

The Alabama Crimson Tide gymnastics is a Division I gymnastics team representing the University of Alabama in NCAA competition. The Tide hosts its home matches in Coleman Coliseum on the university's Tuscaloosa, Alabama campus. One of only eight gymnastics teams to win the national title, the Crimson Tide has won six NCAA championships, ten SEC championships, and an NCAA-record 32 Regional championships. The team is led by head coach Ashley Priess-Johnston, who succeeded Dana Duckworth following the 2022 season.

== History ==
=== The early years ===
With the passage of the 1972 Title 9 Amendment which provided for the inclusion of women in sports, The University of Alabama Gymnastics team existed as a club sport. With the first team acting as a club sport In 1972, The University of Alabama Gymnastics Team existed and competed with such teams as Jacksonville State until it was later sanctioned as a viable gymnastic team in 1975.

The University of Alabama's first gymnastics team debuted in 1975 and began with a loss to Georgia College. The team moved along in relative obscurity, going through four coaches in four years, until the summer of 1978 when Sarah Patterson was announced as the fifth head coach of the Crimson Tide. Her first team finished the year 7-7 and she followed up in 1980 with the first winning season in school history. In 1983, the Crimson Tide made its first championship appearance in Salt Lake City, Utah after winning the South Region, defeating the Florida Gators.

=== The eighties ===
Alabama blossomed into a perennial contender under Sarah Patterson and continued to qualify for nationals as well as producing numerous All-Americans. Penney Hauschild became the Tide's first NCAA Champion in 1985 when she won the uneven bars as well as capturing the All-Around title, becoming the first non-Utah gymnast to do so. She would defend her All-Around title in 1986 while also winning the floor title.

The Crimson Tide continued to advance throughout the decade and finally won their first NCAA title in 1988. The Tide marched into Salt Lake City and defeated host Utah (189.50) and defending champion Georgia (186.80) with a commanding 190.05. 1988 also marked the Tide's first SEC title, when the competition was hosted in Tuscaloosa, Alabama.

=== The nineties ===
The 1990s began with a bang for the Tide as Alabama was crowned the 1990 SEC Champions. The team won its second national title in 1991 before a home crowd in Tuscaloosa. A rivalry between Alabama and Georgia, which endures to this day, began around this time. Patterson and Georgia coach Suzanne Yoculan hosted frequent dual meets between their teams to inspire the rivalry. The Tide first sold out Coleman Coliseum on February 1, 1997, when 15,043 fans watched Alabama take on Georgia; the Tide continues to report some of the highest fan turnout of any program, with an average attendance at home meets in 2014 of 12,826 (second only to Utah).

In 1995, the Tide won their third SEC Tournament championship in Gainesville. Alabama went into their final rotation in fourth place before scoring the highest team vault total in NCAA history as all their gymnasts scored 9.9 or higher, with junior Kim Kelly capping off the night with a perfect 10.

Alabama finished the 1996 season with their third national championship, recording a record team score of 198.025. However, 1997 saw the Crimson Tide fail to reach the Super Six for the first time since 1983.

=== The new millennium ===
Alabama captured their fourth SEC title in 2000, but only managed a fifth-place finish at nationals that year, improving to fourth in 2001. The Tide looked dangerous once again in 2002 as Andreé Pickens, Raegan Tomasek, Alexis Brion, Kristin Sterner, and freshman Jeana Rice led the Tide to a fourth national championship at home in Tuscaloosa, defeating two-time defending national champion UCLA. In 2003, the Tide won their fifth SEC title with the youngest squad in program history, with seven freshman, three sophomores, three juniors and one senior. Nationally, Rice won the All Around in 2004 while freshman Ashley Miles won the first of her three national titles on vault. The Crimson Tide added their first Olympian to the team with Terin Humphrey, a two-time silver medalist at the 2004 Olympics, who joined Alabama in 2005 and would go on to win two national uneven bar titles.

In 2007, the Tide marked their first absence from the Super Six since 1997. In 2009, Alabama was the first gymnastics program to draw two crowds of over 15,000 in one season. They finished the season in second place behind Georgia, their best result since 2005.

=== The 2010s ===
Alabama maintained a rank of No. 1 throughout the 2010 regular season, but struggled at the SEC championships and finished the night as runners up behind Florida. Despite putting on one of the top performances of the preliminaries, Alabama stumbled in their first rotation at Nationals, sinking as low as sixth place during the final competition before rallying back to finish 3rd.

The Tide began the 2011 season with eight freshmen on the team, making it the largest class in school history and accounting for nearly half the roster. The Tide finished the regular season at 11–1, and won the 2011 SEC Championship, taking down No. 1 Florida in the process. Alabama entered the Super Six that year as the No. 1 seed and defeated defending champions UCLA with a winning score of 197.650, their highest Super Six score since 1996. The Tide defeated the overwhelming favorite Florida to win a second consecutive title in 2012 with a score of 197.850.

Alabama entered the 2013 postseason primed for a close battle with Florida in the Super Six, but uncharacteristic mistakes saw Alabama slip to third place behind Oklahoma, while Florida won its first national title. As the host school in 2014, Alabama won their eighth SEC Championship with a team score of 197.875, but fell to fourth place at Nationals after having to count a fall. Alabama's win at the 2014 Seattle Regional marked Patterson's thousandth career win.

In 2015 Dana Duckworth was announced as the head coach after Sarah Patterson retired. She led them to their second straight SEC title, 9th overall, their 21st regional title and a fourth-place finish at Nationals.

== The Power of Pink ==
The Power of Pink is the name given to one of the Crimson Tide's home meets each season in which all the participants and fans wear pink to support breast cancer awareness. The first Power of Pink meet, designated the "Drive 4 the Cause" meet, was held in February 2005 at Alabama's home meet against Auburn; Coach Sarah Patterson ordered pink leotards for her team and requested that all fans show up wearing pink. The meet, now known as the "Pink Meet", is an annual crowd favorite with each following "Pink Meet" selling out. The movement quickly spread among other NCAA gymnastics teams, with many schools participating in at least one Pink Meet per season, usually in late February or early March.

Among Patterson's early supporters was the local DCH Regional Medical Center, which created the DCH Breast Cancer Fund. The fund was set up to provide disadvantaged women with means for early detection and treatment for breast cancer. Other supporters include the University, community leaders and Tuscaloosa Toyota. Tuscaloosa Toyota became more and more involved donating free pink shirts to give away at the meets and prize give-aways during the meet. Over a decade of Pink Meets, almost $1.5 million has been raised for cancer research at the DCH Fund. Each Alabama gymnast escorts a breast cancer survivor during team introductions at Pink Meets hosted in Coleman Coliseum.

== Head coaches ==
Name	Years	Record	Win %
Riki Sutton	1975	4–4–0	.500
Sheila Hill	1976	3–7–0	.300
Phyllis Draper	1977	1–7–0	.130
Tom Steele	1978	6–7–0	.460
Sarah Patterson	1979–2014	392–90–2	.813
Dana Duckworth	2014–2022	52–26–1	.665
Ashley Priess-Johnston	2022 – present		

== NCAA titles ==
Alabama Crimson Tide Team NCAA National Championships
Year	National Champion	Score	Runner-up	Score	Location
1988	Alabama	190.050	Utah Red Rocks	189.500	Jon M. Huntsman Center, Salt Lake City, Utah
1991	Alabama	195.125	Utah Red Rocks	194.375	Coleman Coliseum, Tuscaloosa, Alabama
1996	Alabama	198.025	UCLA Bruins	197.475	Coleman Coliseum, Tuscaloosa, Alabama
2002	Alabama	197.575	Georgia GymDogs	197.250	Coleman Coliseum, Tuscaloosa, Alabama
2011	Alabama	197.650	UCLA Bruins	197.375	Wolstein Center, Cleveland, Ohio
2012	Alabama	197.850	Florida Gators	197.775	Gwinnett Center, Duluth, Georgia

Alabama has won 29 individual NCAA championships.

Individual NCAA Champions
Event	Winner/Year
All Around	Penney Hauschild 1985, 1986; Dee Dee Foster 1990; Meredith Willard 1996; Jeana Rice 2004; Kim Jacob 2014
Vault	Ashley Miles 2003, 2005, 2006; Diandra Milliner 2013; Katie Bailey 2016
Uneven Bars	Penney Hauschild 1985; Stephanie Woods 1996; Andreé Pickens 2002; Terin Humphrey 2005, 2007; Katie Bailey 2017
Balance Beam	Gina Basile, 1991; Dana Dobransky 1992, 1993; Andreé Pickens 1999; Geralen Stack-Eaton 2012; Luisa Blanco 2021
Floor Exercise	Penney Hauschild 1986; Kim Kelly 1996; Ashley Miles 2004; Morgan Dennis 2007; Geralen Stack-Eaton 2011; Lexi Graber 2021

== Current roster ==
Roster (2026–2027)
Alabama Crimson Tide
Name	Height	Year	Hometown	Club
Love Birt	5-0	JR	Camden, DE	First State Gymnastics
Mady Boyd		FR	Tallahassee, FL	Brandy Johnson's Global Gymnastics
Jasmine Cawley	5-1	SO	Clermont, FL	Brandy Johnson's Global Gymnastics
Kennedy Cochran		FR	Chandler, AZ	Gold Medal Gymnastics
Leigh Anne Elliott		FR	Williamsburg, VA	World Class Gymnastics
Ryan Fuller	5-5	JR	Knightsen, CA	Head Over Heels
Elizaveta Grebenkova		FR	Spring, TX	
Ella Sloane Griffin		FR	Leesburg, VA	Dulles Gymnastics
Kylee Kvamme	5-1	JR	Auburn, WA	Metropolitan Gymnastics
Chloe LaCoursiere	5-4	SR	San Diego, CA	Coastal Gymnastics Academy
Kate LaCoursiere		FR	San Diego, CA	Coastal Gymnastics Academy,
Gabby Ladanyi	5-2	SR	Spring, TX	World Champions Centre
Noella Marshall	5-3	SO	China Township, MI	
McKenzie Matters	5-3	SO	New Holland, PA	Prestige Gymnastics
Ella Kate Parker		FR	West Monroe, LA	Cincinnati Gymnastics Academy
Azaraya Ra-Akbar	5-3	SO	Baltimore, MD	Kitchener-Waterloo Gymnastics Club
Addison Sarisky		FR	Girard, OH	Olympic Dreams Gymnastics
Avery Schlichting		FR	Belvidere, IL	Energym Gymnastics
Jamison Sears	4-11	SR	Yorktown, VA	World Class Gymnastics
Paityn Walker	5-3	JR	Hercules, CA	Head Over Heels

- Head coach: Ashley Priess Johnston
- Associate head coach: Justin Spring
- Assistant coach: Amelia Hundley
- Assistant coach: Ross Thompson

== Team records ==
=== Top team total ===
Rank	Score	Meet	Year
1	198.250	Stanford	2014
2	198.175	NCAA Regional	2022
T3	198.075	NCAA Regional	1996
T3	198.075	Arkansas	2022
5	198.025	Super Six	1996
T6	198.000	NCAA Regional	2001
T6	198.000	Elevate the Stage	2022
T6	198.000	Metroplex Challenge	2023
9	197.975	Auburn	2003
10	197.950	SEC Championships	2004

=== Top vault total ===
Rank	Score	Meet	Year
1	49.775	Super Six	1996
2	49.750	SEC Championships	1995
3	49.675	Georgia	2004
4	49.650	Kentucky	2010
T5	49.625	Super Six	2012
T5	49.625	SEC Championships	2004
T5	49.625	Auburn	2003
T5	49.625	Super Six	2005
T5	49.625	Stanford	2014

=== Top uneven bars total ===
Rank	Score	Meet	Year
T1	49.675	NCAA Regional	2021
T1	49.675	SEC Championships	2022
T3	49.650	SEC Championships	2014
T3	49.650	Arkansas	2022
T5	49.625	NCAA Regional	2001
T5	49.625	NCAA Regional	2021
T5	49.625	Elevate the Stage	2022

=== Top balance beam total ===
Rank	Score	Meet	Year
1	49.725	NCAA Regional	2001
2	49.700	LSU	2023
T3	49.650	Auburn	2014
T3	49.650	Auburn	2022
T3	49.650	Auburn	2023

=== Top floor total ===
Rank	Score	Meet	Year
T1	49.700	Georgia	2001
T1	49.700	Arkansas	2022
T1	49.700	Auburn	2023
T4	49.675	SEC Championships	2004
T4	49.675	Stanford	2014
T4	49.675	Super Six	2014

== Past Olympians ==
- Terin Humphrey (2004)
- Dominique Pegg (Canada) (2012)
- Kylie Dickson (Belarus) (2016)
- Shallon Olsen (Canada) (2016, 2020, 2024)
- Luisa Blanco (Colombia) (2024)
