= Haleigh Bryant =

American artistic gymnast

- Full name: Haleigh Alexandra Bryant
- Born: December 20, 2001 (age 24) Atlanta, Georgia, U.S.
- Height: 5 ft 5 in (165 cm)

Gymnastics career
- Discipline: Women's artistic gymnastics
- College team: LSU Tigers (2021–25)
- Club: Everest
- Head coach: Jay Clark
- Retired: April 2025
- Awards: See awards
Medal record
Representing Louisiana State Tigers
NCAA Championships
Gold medal – first place	2021 Fort Worth	Vault
Gold medal – first place	2024 Fort Worth	Team
Gold medal – first place	2024 Fort Worth	All-Around
Bronze medal – third place	2023 Fort Worth	All-Around
Bronze medal – third place	2024 Fort Worth	Balance Beam

Haleigh Bryant
Current position
- Title: Assistant Coach
- Team: LSU Tigers
- Conference: SEC

Biographical details
- Education: Louisiana State University

Coaching career (HC unless noted)
- 2025–present: LSU Tigers (Assistant coach)

Haleigh Alexandra Bryant (born December 20, 2001) is an American former artistic gymnast and current assistant coach for the LSU Tigers gymnastics team. She is the 2024 NCAA Champion in the team and individual all-around, and is the 2021 NCAA Champion on vault.

== Early life ==
Bryant was born in Atlanta in 2001 to Terry and Trisha Bryant. She started training in gymnastics in 2004 and moved to North Carolina in 2011 where she trained at Everest gymnastics. Bryant attended William Amos Hough High School.

== Gymnastics career ==
=== Level 10 ===
Bryant competed at the 2016 Nastia Liukin Cup where she placed sixth in the junior division. She competed at the 2016 Junior Olympic Championships where she placed sixth in the all-around. At the 2017 Junior Olympic Championships Bryant placed first in the all-around in the junior-B division and also won titles on vault and floor exercise.

Bryant returned to the Nastia Liukin Cup in 2018, winning the senior title. At the 2018 Junior Olympic Championships she defended her vault title and finished second on floor exercise and third in the all-around. The following year Bryant once again won gold on vault. She additionally placed first on uneven bars and second in the all-around.

In November 2019 Bryant signed her national letter of intent with the Louisiana State Tigers. In her final level 10 before going to Louisiana State University, she competed at the 2020 Nastia Liukin Cup where she won the all-around title. In doing so she became the first gymnast to win two Nastia Liukin Cup titles. At her final Junior Olympic Championships Bryant once again won the title on vault.

== Collegiate gymnastics career ==
=== 2020–21 season ===
Bryant made her NCAA debut in a meet against Arkansas where she recorded the highest all-around score. She earned her first perfect ten on vault in a meet against Missouri on March 3.

At the SEC Championships Bryant won the vault title and helped LSU finish second as a team behind Alabama. At the NCAA Championships semi-finals Bryant won the vault title alongside Anastasia Webb; additionally she placed fifth in the all-around and on balance beam. However, LSU did not advance to the finals.

=== 2023–24 season ===
On February 9, in a meet against Georgia, Bryant earned her first perfect 10 on the balance beam. In doing so, she became the fourteenth NCAA gymnast to earn a gym slam (a perfect 10 on each of the four apparatuses) and the first LSU gymnast to do so. At the 2024 NCAA Championships, she won third on Balance Beam, and claimed the title of All Around National Champion. She also lead her team to LSU's first ever National Championship.

=== 2024-25 season ===
In April 2024 Bryant announced that she would be returning for a fifth and final year. At the 2025 SEC championships Bryant won the all-around and beam titles as well as placing second on vault and floor. Her scores helped the tigers win the team competition, with Bryant becoming a five-time SEC Champion. At the 2025 NCAA Championships she finished sixth in the all-around.

Bryant announced her retirement from gymnastics on Instagram in April 2025, finishing her career as a 3 time national champion.

== Competitive history ==
Competitive history of Haleigh Bryant
Year	Event	Team	AA	VT	UB	BB	FX
2016	Nastia Liukin Cup		6				
2016	Junior Olympic Championships		6		5		4
2017	Junior Olympic Championships		1st place, gold medalist(s)	1st place, gold medalist(s)	5	9	1st place, gold medalist(s)
2018	Nastia Liukin Cup		1st place, gold medalist(s)				
2018	Junior Olympic Championships		3rd place, bronze medalist(s)	1st place, gold medalist(s)	6		2nd place, silver medalist(s)
2019	Junior Olympic Championships		2nd place, silver medalist(s)	1st place, gold medalist(s)	1st place, gold medalist(s)	5	5
2020	Nastia Liukin Cup		1st place, gold medalist(s)				
2020	Junior Olympic Championships		5	1st place, gold medalist(s)		5	
2021	SEC Championships	2nd place, silver medalist(s)		1st place, gold medalist(s)			
2021	NCAA Championships	6	5	1st place, gold medalist(s)		5	
2022	SEC Championships	5	15			2nd place, silver medalist(s)	
2023	SEC Championships	3rd place, bronze medalist(s)	7	7	22	31	2nd place, silver medalist(s)
2023	NCAA Championships	4	3rd place, bronze medalist(s)				
2024	SEC Championships	1st place, gold medalist(s)					
2024	NCAA Championships	1st place, gold medalist(s)	1st place, gold medalist(s)	8	6	3rd place, bronze medalist(s)	12
2025	SEC Championships	1st place, gold medalist(s)	1st place, gold medalist(s)	2nd place, silver medalist(s)	16	1st place, gold medalist(s)	2nd place, silver medalist(s)
2025	NCAA Championships	5	6	5	24	20	10

== Collegiate stats ==
=== Career perfect 10.0 ===
Season	Date	Event	Meet
2021	March 5, 2021	Vault	LSU vs Missouri
2021	April 3, 2021	Vault	NCAA Regionals
2022	February 5, 2022	Vault	LSU vs Auburn
2022	February 20, 2022	Vault	LSU @ Missouri
2022	March 11, 2022	Vault	LSU vs Utah
2023	January 20, 2023	Vault	LSU vs Missouri
2023	February 24, 2023	Vault	LSU @ Alabama
2023	March 10, 2023	Uneven Bars	LSU vs West Virginia
2023	March 10, 2023	Vault	LSU vs West Virginia
2023	March 10, 2023	Floor Exercise	LSU vs West Virginia
2024	January 19, 2024	Uneven Bars	LSU vs Kentucky
2024	February 2, 2024	Floor Exercise	LSU vs Arkansas
2024	February 9, 2024	Balance Beam	LSU @ Georgia
2024	March 1, 2024	Floor Exercise	LSU vs Alabama
2024	March 18, 2024	Vault	LSU @ Podium Challenge (Auburn, GWU, TWU)
2024	March 18, 2024	Uneven Bars	LSU @ Podium Challenge (Auburn, GWU, TWU)
2024	April 6, 2024	Vault	Arkansas Regional Final
2024	April 6, 2024	Uneven Bars	Arkansas Regional Final

=== Regular season rankings ===
Season	All-Around	Vault	Uneven Bars	Balance Beam	Floor Exercise
2021	9th	3rd	78th	59th	4th
2022	N/A	3rd	15th	25th	102nd
2023	4th	1st	14th	30th	6th
2024	1st	1st	4th	8th	7th
2025	N/A	7th	N/A	9th	8th

== Awards ==
Year	Award	Result	Ref
2023	Honda Sports Award	Nominated	
2024	SEC Gymnast of the Year	Won	
2024	AAI Award	Won	
2024	Honda Sports Award	Won	
