= 2024 NCAA women's gymnastics tournament =

Collegiate gymnastics competition

- Venue: Dickies Arena (semi-finals and final)
- Location: Fort Worth, Texas
- Dates: April 3 - April 20
- Teams: 36
- Winning score: 198.2250

Medalists
| gold medal | LSU |
| silver medal | California |
| bronze medal | Utah |

The 2024 NCAA women's gymnastics tournament was the 41st NCAA women's gymnastics tournament, the annual women's gymnastics championship contested by the teams of the member associations of NCAA. The first and second round and regional final were hosted on campuses from April 3 to April 7, 2024, while the semi-final and final were held at Dickies Arena in Fort Worth, Texas from April 18 to April 20, 2024.

LSU won the national title, becoming only the 8th school to win the tournament in NCAA history.

== Format ==
The eight lowest seeded teams will compete in the first round, followed by the second round. The top two teams from each region will be moved on to the semi-finals in Fort Worth, Texas.

== Bracket ==
First round
April 3 – Ann Arbor
Illinois | 195.825
Ball State | 195.725
April 4 – Gainesville
Clemson | 195.625
Iowa State | 195.875
April 3 – Fayetteville
Boise State | 195.750
BYU | 195.750
April 4 – Berkeley
Southern Utah | 195.525
San Jose State | 195.500

Second round
April 4 – Ann Arbor
#8 Alabama #11 Michigan | 197.450 196.725
Kent State Penn State | 195.650 196.925
April 4 – Ann Arbor
#1 Oklahoma #16 NC State | 198.050 195.950
Ohio State Illinois | 196.975 196.750
April 5 – Gainesville
#5 Utah #10 Michigan State | 197.825 197.475
Towson Maryland | 195.050 196.350
April 5 – Gainesville
#4 Florida #13 Missouri | 197.925 197.525
Georgia Iowa State | 197.425 196.575
April 4 – Fayetteville
#7 Kentucky #12 Arkansas | 197.100 197.325
Arizona Nebraska | 195.600 196.600
April 4 – Fayetteville
#2 LSU #15 Minnesota | 197.800 196.950
Oregon State BYU | 196.450 196.500
April 5 – Berkeley
#6 Denver #9 UCLA | 197.275 197.050
Arizona State Washington | 197.150 196.650
April 5 – Berkeley
#3 Cal #14 Auburn | 197.800 196.800
Stanford Southern Utah | 197.600 196.475

Regional final
April 6 – Ann Arbor
#8 Alabama Penn State | 197.575 197.200
#1 Oklahoma Ohio State | 198.400 197.200
April 7 – Gainesville
#5 Utah #10 Michigan State | 197.575 196.625
#4 Florida #13 Missouri | 198.325 197.325
April 6 – Fayetteville
#7 Kentucky #12 Arkansas | 197.475 197.825
#2 LSU #15 Minnesota | 198.250 197.400
April 7 – Berkeley
#6 Denver Arizona State | 197.450 196.750
#3 Cal Stanford | 198.275 197.575

Semi-finals
April 18 – Fort Worth
#1 Oklahoma #8 Alabama | 196.6625 195.4125
#4 Florida #5 Utah | 197.8750 197.9375
April 18 – Fort Worth
#2 LSU #12 Arkansas | 198.1125 196.4750
#3 Cal Stanford | 197.7125 197.0750

Final
April 20 – Fort Worth
#4 Florida #5 Utah | 197.4375 197.8000
#2 LSU #3 Cal | 198.2250 197.8500

== Individual qualifiers ==
2024 NCAA women's gymnastics tournament individual qualifiers
| All-around | Vault | Uneven bars | Balance beam | Floor exercise |
|---|---|---|---|---|
| Gabby Wilson (Michigan) | Sierra Brooks (Michigan) | Carly Bauman (Michigan) | Amani Herring (Penn State) | Sierra Brooks (Michigan) |
| Jade Carey (Oregon State) | Mya Hooten (Minnesota) | Courtney Blackson (Boise State) | Isabella Magnelli (Kentucky) | Raena Worley (Kentucky) |
| Lily Smith (Georgia) | Emma Silberman (Maryland) | Mara Titarsolej (Mizzou) | Nikki Smith (Michigan State) | Skyla Schulte (Michigan State) |
| Skylar Killough-Wilhelm (Washington) | Anaya Smith (Arizona State) | Jada Mangahas (Arizona State) | Selena Harris (UCLA) | Chae Campbell (UCLA) |

== Regional results ==
=== Ann Arbor Regional ===
First round

| Seed | School | Vault | Bars | Beam | Floor | Overall |
|---|---|---|---|---|---|---|
| – | Illinois | 48.875 | 49.050 | 48.900 | 49.000 | 195.825 |
| – | Ball State | 49.100 | 48.800 | 48.925 | 48.900 | 195.725 |

Session 1 (Round 2)

| Seed | School | Vault | Bars | Beam | Floor | Overall |
|---|---|---|---|---|---|---|
| 8 | Alabama | 49.300 | 49.475 | 49.400 | 49.275 | 197.450 |
| – | Penn State | 49.300 | 49.075 | 49.325 | 49.225 | 196.925 |
| 11 | Michigan | 49.425 | 49.375 | 48.450 | 49.475 | 196.725 |
| – | Kent State | 48.925 | 48.900 | 48.725 | 49.100 | 195.650 |

Session 2 (Round 2)

| Seed | School | Vault | Bars | Beam | Floor | Overall |
|---|---|---|---|---|---|---|
| 1 | Oklahoma | 49.425 | 49.525 | 49.575 | 49.525 | 198.050 |
| – | Ohio State | 49.275 | 49.275 | 49.100 | 49.325 | 196.975 |
| – | Illinois | 49.075 | 49.225 | 49.250 | 49.200 | 196.750 |
| 16 | NC State | 48.825 | 48.925 | 49.050 | 49.150 | 195.950 |

Regional Final

| Seed | School | Vault | Bars | Beam | Floor | Overall |
|---|---|---|---|---|---|---|
| 1 | Oklahoma | 49.325 | 49.600 | 49.800 | 49.675 | 198.400 |
| 8 | Alabama | 49.225 | 49.350 | 49.350 | 49.650 | 197.575 |
| – | Ohio State | 49.225 | 49.175 | 49.225 | 49.575 | 197.200 |
| – | Penn State | 49.200 | 49.375 | 49.300 | 49.175 | 197.050 |

=== Fayetteville Regional ===
First round

| Seed | School | Vault | Bars | Beam | Floor | Overall |
|---|---|---|---|---|---|---|
| – | BYU | 49.000 | 48.900 | 49.150 | 48.700 | 195.750 |
| – | Boise State | 49.000 | 48.775 | 49.100 | 48.875 | 195.750 |

Session 1 (Round 2)

| Seed | School | Vault | Bars | Beam | Floor | Overall |
|---|---|---|---|---|---|---|
| 12 | Arkansas | 49.375 | 49.150 | 49.350 | 49.450 | 197.325 |
| 7 | Kentucky | 49.350 | 49.025 | 49.350 | 49.375 | 197.100 |
| – | Nebraska | 49.025 | 49.225 | 49.125 | 49.225 | 196.600 |
| – | Arizona | 48.925 | 48.675 | 48.900 | 49.100 | 195.600 |

Session 2 (Round 2)

| Seed | School | Vault | Bars | Beam | Floor | Overall |
|---|---|---|---|---|---|---|
| 2 | LSU | 49.375 | 49.375 | 49.350 | 49.700 | 197.800 |
| 15 | Minnesota | 49.225 | 49.025 | 49.200 | 49.500 | 196.950 |
| – | BYU | 49.050 | 49.050 | 49.200 | 49.200 | 196.500 |
| – | Oregon State | 49.075 | 49.300 | 48.625 | 49.450 | 196.450 |

Regional Final

| Seed | School | Vault | Bars | Beam | Floor | Overall |
|---|---|---|---|---|---|---|
| 2 | LSU | 49.550 | 49.625 | 49.450 | 49.625 | 198.250 |
| 12 | Arkansas | 49.375 | 49.450 | 49.525 | 49.475 | 197.825 |
| 7 | Kentucky | 49.275 | 49.400 | 49.325 | 49.475 | 197.475 |
| 15 | Minnesota | 49.250 | 49.500 | 49.225 | 49.425 | 197.400 |

=== Berkeley Regional ===
First round

| Seed | School | Vault | Bars | Beam | Floor | Overall |
|---|---|---|---|---|---|---|
| – | Southern Utah | 48.825 | 48.650 | 49.000 | 49.050 | 195.525 |
| – | San Jose State | 48.975 | 48.950 | 48.125 | 49.450 | 195.500 |

Session 1 (Round 2)

| Seed | School | Vault | Bars | Beam | Floor | Overall |
|---|---|---|---|---|---|---|
| 6 | Denver | 49.025 | 49.250 | 49.425 | 49.575 | 197.275 |
| – | Arizona State | 49.200 | 49.325 | 49.250 | 49.375 | 197.150 |
| 9 | UCLA | 49.150 | 49.075 | 49.250 | 49.575 | 197.050 |
| – | Washington | 49.150 | 49.125 | 48.850 | 49.525 | 196.650 |

Session 2 (Round 2)

| Seed | School | Vault | Bars | Beam | Floor | Overall |
|---|---|---|---|---|---|---|
| 3 | Cal | 49.275 | 49.475 | 49.475 | 49.575 | 197.800 |
| – | Stanford | 49.275 | 49.400 | 49.450 | 49.475 | 197.600 |
| 14 | Auburn | 48.975 | 48.975 | 49.300 | 49.550 | 196.800 |
| – | Southern Utah | 49.125 | 49.100 | 49.075 | 49.175 | 196.475 |

Regional Final

| Seed | School | Vault | Bars | Beam | Floor | Overall |
|---|---|---|---|---|---|---|
| 3 | Cal | 49.500 | 49.675 | 49.400 | 49.700 | 198.275 |
| – | Stanford | 49.150 | 49.475 | 49.350 | 49.600 | 197.575 |
| 6 | Denver | 49.375 | 49.400 | 49.225 | 49.450 | 197.450 |
| – | Arizona State | 49.075 | 49.225 | 49.075 | 49.375 | 196.750 |

=== Gainesville Regional ===
First round

| Seed | School | Vault | Bars | Beam | Floor | Overall |
|---|---|---|---|---|---|---|
| – | Iowa State | 49.025 | 48.600 | 49.225 | 49.025 | 195.875 |
| – | Clemson | 49.200 | 48.375 | 48.975 | 49.075 | 195.625 |

Session 1 (Round 2)

| Seed | School | Vault | Bars | Beam | Floor | Overall |
|---|---|---|---|---|---|---|
| 5 | Utah | 49.225 | 49.575 | 49.600 | 49.425 | 197.825 |
| 10 | Michigan State | 49.450 | 49.350 | 49.300 | 49.375 | 197.475 |
| – | Maryland | 49.175 | 49.050 | 49.125 | 49.000 | 196.350 |
| – | Towson | 49.075 | 48.400 | 48.500 | 49.075 | 195.050 |

Session 2 (Round 2)

| Seed | School | Vault | Bars | Beam | Floor | Overall |
|---|---|---|---|---|---|---|
| 4 | Florida | 49.575 | 49.300 | 49.575 | 49.475 | 197.925 |
| 13 | Missouri | 49.375 | 49.475 | 49.375 | 49.300 | 197.525 |
| – | Georgia | 49.300 | 49.375 | 49.450 | 49.300 | 197.425 |
| – | Iowa State | 49.050 | 48.975 | 49.350 | 49.200 | 196.575 |

Regional Final

| Seed | School | Vault | Bars | Beam | Floor | Overall |
|---|---|---|---|---|---|---|
| 4 | Florida | 49.575 | 49.500 | 49.600 | 49.650 | 198.325 |
| 5 | Utah | 49.500 | 48.975 | 49.475 | 49.625 | 197.575 |
| 13 | Missouri | 49.275 | 49.275 | 49.250 | 49.525 | 197.325 |
| 12 | Michigan State | 49.425 | 49.000 | 48.675 | 49.525 | 196.650 |

== NCAA championship ==
=== Semi-finals ===
The top two teams from each semifinal advanced to the National Championship, which was televised live on ABC on April 20 at 4:00 pm ET.

Semifinal I - April 18 at 4:30 PM ET
| Seed | School | Vault | Bars | Beam | Floor | Total |
|---|---|---|---|---|---|---|
| 2 | LSU | 49.3250 | 49.4750 | 49.5875 | 49.7250 | 198.1125 |
| 3 | California | 49.3625 | 49.5250 | 49.4125 | 49.4125 | 197.7125 |
| – | Stanford | 49.2250 | 49.2500 | 49.3125 | 49.2875 | 197.0750 |
| 12 | Arkansas | 49.3250 | 49.2000 | 48.8125 | 49.1375 | 196.4750 |

Semifinal II - April 18 at 9 PM ET
| Seed | School | Vault | Bars | Beam | Floor | Total |
|---|---|---|---|---|---|---|
| 5 | Utah | 49.2000 | 49.5125 | 49.6375 | 49.5875 | 197.9375 |
| 4 | Florida | 49.5000 | 49.4500 | 49.4750 | 49.4500 | 197.8750 |
| 1 | Oklahoma | 48.3250 | 49.6625 | 49.1000 | 49.5750 | 196.6625 |
| 8 | Alabama | 49.2625 | 49.4875 | 47.2500 | 49.4125 | 195.4125 |

=== Final ===
| Rank | Team | Vault (gymnastics) | Uneven bars | Balance beam | Floor (gymnastics) | Total |
|---|---|---|---|---|---|---|
| 1st place, gold medalist(s) | LSU | 49.4000 | 49.4500 | 49.7625 | 49.6125 | 198.2250 |
| 1st place, gold medalist(s) | Konnor McClain | | 9.9000 | 9.9625 | 9.9250 | |
| 1st place, gold medalist(s) | Amari Drayton | 9.8250 | | | 9.9125 | |
| 1st place, gold medalist(s) | KJ Johnson | 9.8000 | | | 9.2875 | |
| 1st place, gold medalist(s) | Aleah Finnegan | 9.8375 | | 9.9500 | 9.9125 | |
| 1st place, gold medalist(s) | Haleigh Bryant | 9.9500 | 9.8750 | 9.9500 | 9.9375 | 39.7125 |
| 1st place, gold medalist(s) | Kiya Johnson | 9.9125 | 9.8875 | 9.9500 | 9.9250 | 39.6750 |
| 1st place, gold medalist(s) | Savannah Schoenherr | 9.8750 | 9.8625 | 9.3875 | | |
| 1st place, gold medalist(s) | Alexis Jeffrey | | 9.9000 | | | |
| 1st place, gold medalist(s) | Ashley Cowan | | 9.8875 | | | |
| 1st place, gold medalist(s) | Sierra Ballard | | | 9.9500 | | |
| 2nd place, silver medalist(s) | California | 49.5000 | 49.5000 | 49.4750 | 49.3750 | 197.8500 |
| 2nd place, silver medalist(s) | Andi Li | | 9.8875 | 9.8750 | 9.8250 | |
| 2nd place, silver medalist(s) | Madelyn Williams | 9.8500 | 9.9000 | 9.8625 | 9.8625 | 39.4750 |
| 2nd place, silver medalist(s) | Ella Cesario | 9.8625 | 9.8875 | 9.8875 | 9.8625 | 39.5000 |
| 2nd place, silver medalist(s) | eMjae Frazier | 9.9375 | 9.9125 | 9.9500 | 9.9125 | 39.7125 |
| 2nd place, silver medalist(s) | Mya Lauzon | 9.9500 | 9.4750 | 9.9000 | 9.9125 | 39.2375 |
| 2nd place, silver medalist(s) | Gabby Perea | | 9.9125 | 9.4125 | | |
| 2nd place, silver medalist(s) | Kyen Mayhew | 9.9000 | | | 9.2000 | |
| 2nd place, silver medalist(s) | Jayden Silvers | 9.8500 | | | | |
| 3rd place, bronze medalist(s) | Utah | 49.3000 | 49.4375 | 49.4750 | 49.5875 | 197.8000 |
| 3rd place, bronze medalist(s) | Makenna Smith | 9.9125 | 9.8500 | 9.8375 | 9.9000 | 39.5000 |
| 3rd place, bronze medalist(s) | Ella Zirbes | 9.6750 | 9.8625 | | 9.9125 | |
| 3rd place, bronze medalist(s) | Amelie Morgan | | 9.8750 | 9.9125 | | |
| 3rd place, bronze medalist(s) | Maile O'Keefe | | 9.9000 | 9.9000 | 9.9250 | |
| 3rd place, bronze medalist(s) | Grace McCallum | 9.9000 | 9.9500 | 9.9375 | 9.9000 | 39.6875 |
| 3rd place, bronze medalist(s) | Alani Sabado | | 9.8375 | | | |
| 3rd place, bronze medalist(s) | Abby Paulson | | | 9.8500 | 9.9250 | |
| 3rd place, bronze medalist(s) | Elizabeth Gantner | | | 9.8750 | | |
| 3rd place, bronze medalist(s) | Jaylene Gilstrap | | | | 9.9250 | |
| 3rd place, bronze medalist(s) | Camie Winger | 9.2875 | | | | |
| 3rd place, bronze medalist(s) | Ashley Glynn | 9.9125 | | | | |
| 3rd place, bronze medalist(s) | Jaedyn Rucker | 9.9000 | | | | |
| 4 | Florida | 49.2500 | 49.4750 | 49.2375 | 49.4750 | 197.4375 |
| 4 | Skylar Draser | 9.8750 | 9.9000 | 9.9000 | | |
| 4 | Victoria Nguyen | 9.8500 | 9.8750 | | 9.9125 | 39.3000 |
| 4 | Anya Pilgrim | 9.8000 | 9.8875 | 9.8750 | 9.8625 | 39.4250 |
| 4 | Danie Ferris | 9.9125 | | | 9.8500 | |
| 4 | Leanne Wong | 9.8125 | 9.9500 | 9.3750 | 9.9500 | 39.0875 |
| 4 | Ellie Lazzari | 9.7875 | 9.8500 | 9.8500 | 9.8875 | 39.3750 |
| 4 | Sloane Blakely | | 9.8625 | 9.9500 | | |

== Individual results ==
=== Medalists ===
| Event | Gold | Silver | Bronze |
|---|---|---|---|
| Individual all-around | Haleigh Bryant (LSU) | Jade Carey (Oregon St) Leanne Wong (Florida) | Not awarded |
| Vault | Anna Roberts (Stanford) | Anaya Smith (Arizona St) Leanne Wong (Florida) | Not awarded |
| Uneven bars | Audrey Davis (OU) Leanne Wong (Florida) | Not awarded | Jordan Bowers (OU) Katherine LeVasseur (OU) |
| Balance beam | Audrey Davis (OU) Faith Torrez (OU) | Not awarded | Haleigh Bryant (LSU) Jade Carey (Oregon St) Selena Harris (UCLA) Mya Lauzon (California) Isabella Magnelli (Kentucky) Maile O'Keefe (Utah) Abby Paulson (Utah) Ragan Smith (OU) |
| Floor | Aleah Finnegan (LSU) | Jordan Bowers (OU) Sierra Brooks (Michigan) Jade Carey (Oregon St) Jaylene Gilstrap (Utah) KJ Johnson (LSU) Maile O'Keefe (Utah) Faith Torrez (OU) Raena Worley (Kentucky) | Not awarded |

=== All-around ===
| Rank | Gymnast | Vault (gymnastics) | Uneven bars | Balance beam | Floor (gymnastics) | Total |
|---|---|---|---|---|---|---|
| 1st place, gold medalist(s) | Haleigh Bryant (LSU) | 9.9000 | 9.9250 | 9.9500 | 9.9375 | 39.7125 |
| 2nd place, silver medalist(s) | Jade Carey (Oregon St) | 9.9000 | 9.9000 | 9.9500 | 9.9500 | 39.7000 |
| 2nd place, silver medalist(s) | Leanne Wong (Florida) | 9.9375 | 9.9625 | 9.8875 | 9.9125 | 39.7000 |
| 4 | Mya Lauzon (California) | 9.9000 | 9.9000 | 9.9500 | 9.8875 | 39.6375 |
| 4 | Anna Roberts (Stanford) | 9.9500 | 9.8875 | 9.9000 | 9.9000 | 39.6375 |
| 4 | Makenna Smith (Utah) | 9.9125 | 9.9125 | 9.9250 | 9.8875 | 39.6375 |
| 7 | Kiya Johnson (LSU) | 9.8750 | 9.9000 | 9.9000 | 9.9375 | 39.6125 |
| 8 | Lilly Hudson (Alabama) | 9.8875 | 9.9000 | 9.9000 | 9.8875 | 39.5750 |
| 9 | Skylar Killough-Wilhelm (Washington) | 9.8500 | 9.9250 | 9.8875 | 9.8875 | 39.5500 |
| 9 | Victoria Nguyen (Florida) | 9.8500 | 9.9125 | 9.9125 | 9.8750 | 39.5500 |
| 11 | Audrey Davis (OU) | 9.7250 | 9.9625 | 9.9625 | 9.8875 | 39.5375 |
| 11 | Anya Pilgrim (Florida) | 9.9125 | 9.9000 | 9.8500 | 9.8750 | 39.5375 |
| 13 | eMjae Frazier (California) | 9.8500 | 9.9000 | 9.8125 | 9.9375 | 39.5000 |
| 13 | Gabby Wilson (Michigan) | 9.8500 | 9.8625 | 9.8750 | 9.9125 | 39.5000 |
| 15 | Lily Smith (Georgia) | 9.7250 | 9.9250 | 9.9125 | 9.9125 | 39.4750 |
| 16 | Madelyn Williams (California) | 9.8875 | 9.8250 | 9.8875 | 9.8625 | 39.4625 |
| 17 | Grace McCallum (Utah) | 9.7750 | 9.8750 | 9.8875 | 9.9000 | 39.4375 |
| 18 | Chloe Widner (Stanford) | 9.8500 | 9.8000 | 9.8375 | 9.9000 | 39.3875 |
| 19 | Jordan Bowers (OU) | 9.4500 | 9.9500 | 9.9375 | 9.9500 | 39.2875 |
| 20 | Brenna Neault (Stanford) | 9.7625 | 9.8250 | 9.8500 | 9.8375 | 39.2750 |
| 21 | Faith Torrez (OU) | 9.3250 | 9.8500 | 9.9625 | 9.9500 | 39.0875 |
| 22 | Ella Cesario (California) | 9.8500 | 9.9000 | 9.2875 | 9.8250 | 38.8625 |
| 23 | Luisa Blanco (Alabama) | 9.8750 | 9.9375 | 9.1375 | 9.9000 | 38.8500 |
| 24 | Katherine LeVasseur (OU) | 9.3750 | 9.9500 | 9.1375 | 9.9000 | 38.3625 |
| 25 | Ellie Lazzari (Florida) | 9.9250 | 9.1625 | 8.9750 | 9.8250 | 37.8875 |
