= UCLA Bruins =

Sports team name of University of California, Los Angeles

- University: University of California, Los Angeles
- Nickname: Bruins
- NCAA: Division I (FBS)
- Conference: Big Ten (primary); Mountain Pacific Sports Federation (indoor track & field, men's volleyball, water polo)
- Athletic director: Tim Harris
- Location: Los Angeles, California
- Varsity teams: 25
- Football stadium: Rose Bowl
- Basketball arena: Pauley Pavilion
- Baseball stadium: Jackie Robinson Stadium
- Softball stadium: Easton Stadium
- Soccer stadium: Wallis Annenberg Stadium
- Other venues: Bel-Air Country Club; Drake Stadium; John Wooden Center; Los Angeles Tennis Center; Spieker Aquatics Center; Sunset Canyon Recreation Center; UCLA Marina Aquatic Center
- Colors: Blue and gold
- Mascot: Joe & Josephine (Josie) Bruin
- Fight song: "Sons of Westwood"
- Website: uclabruins.com
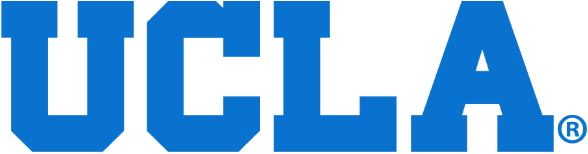

Big Ten logo in UCLA's colors

The UCLA Bruins are the athletic teams that represent the University of California, Los Angeles. The Bruin men's and women's teams participate in NCAA Division I as part of the Big Ten Conference and the Mountain Pacific Sports Federation (MPSF). For football, they are in the Football Bowl Subdivision of Division I (formerly Division I-A). UCLA is second to only Stanford University as the school with the most NCAA team championships at 127 NCAA team championships. UCLA offers 11 varsity sports programs for men and 14 for women.

== History ==
Upon its founding, UCLA joined the Southern California Intercollegiate Athletic Conference (SCIAC). In 1927, UCLA left the SCIAC and joined the Pacific Coast Conference, the forerunner of the Pac-12 Conference.

Following "pay-for-play" scandals at California, USC, UCLA, and Washington, the PCC disbanded in June 1959. On July 1, 1959, the new Athletic Association of Western Universities was launched, with California, UCLA, USC, and Washington as the four charter members. The conference renamed itself the Pacific-8 Conference in 1968, then the Pacific-10 Conference in 1978, and the Pac-12 in 2011.

=== Nickname and mascot ===
Upon UCLA's founding as the Southern Branch of the University of California in 1919, the football team was known as the "Cubs" because of its younger relationship to the California Bears in Berkeley. In 1923, the team adopted the nickname "Grizzlies". In 1926, the Grizzlies became the 10th and final member of the Pacific Coast Conference, which already included the University of Montana Grizzlies. The school, which had taken the "University of California, Los Angeles" name that year, became the "Bruins" and has been recognized as such in the years since.

The Bruins began to use live bears as mascots in the 1930s, renting animals to appear at all UCLA home football games at the Los Angeles Memorial Coliseum. The practice grew less common until the 1950s, when students and alumni brought "Little Joe Bruin" to Westwood. A Himalayan bear cub from India, "Little Joe" grew too large and was transferred to a circus. "Josephine" was purchased by a group of alumni in 1961 and was kept in the backyard of the Rally Committee chairman. She was eventually taken to the San Diego Zoo.

A costumed mascot by the name of Joe Bruin was introduced in 1963. In 1967, the first female student to take the mascot role created Josephine "Josie" Bruin and joined Joe at athletic events. The design for the costumed bears has changed over the years, and Joe has had at least six looks over his history.

=== Team colors ===
The UCLA athletic teams' colors are UCLA Blue and Westwood Gold. Blue symbolizes the ocean and wildflowers; yellow to reflect the Golden State, the California poppy and sunsets.

In the early days of the school, UCLA had the same colors as the University of California, Berkeley: Yale Blue and gold. When football coach Red Sanders came to UCLA for the 1949 season he redesigned the football uniforms. The Yale blue was changed to a lighter shade of blue. Sanders figured that the baby blue would look better on the field and in a film. He would dub the baby blue uniform "powder-keg blue".

In 2002, UCLA Athletics and Adidas developed a new True Blue color that was darker than powder blue; it was used for all athletic teams starting in 2003. The UCLA Marching Band incorporated True Blue into its previous navy blue uniforms in 2007. The shade was replaced in 2017 with a return to Powderkeg Blue when UCLA switched to Under Armour as its apparel provider. In 2021, Nike and the Jordan Brand aligned the athletics blue with the university's UCLA Blue hue, which has been used by the school's academic and administrative units. The school's academic and administrative units had used UCLA Blue since 2004.

== Varsity sports ==
Men's sports	Women's sports
Baseball	Basketball
Basketball	Beach volleyball
Cross country	Cross country
Football	Golf
Golf	Gymnastics
Soccer	Rowing
Tennis	Soccer
Track and field^{†}	Softball
Volleyball	Swimming & diving
Water polo	Tennis
	Track and field^{†}
	Volleyball
	Water polo
† – Track and field includes both indoor and outdoor.

=== Baseball ===
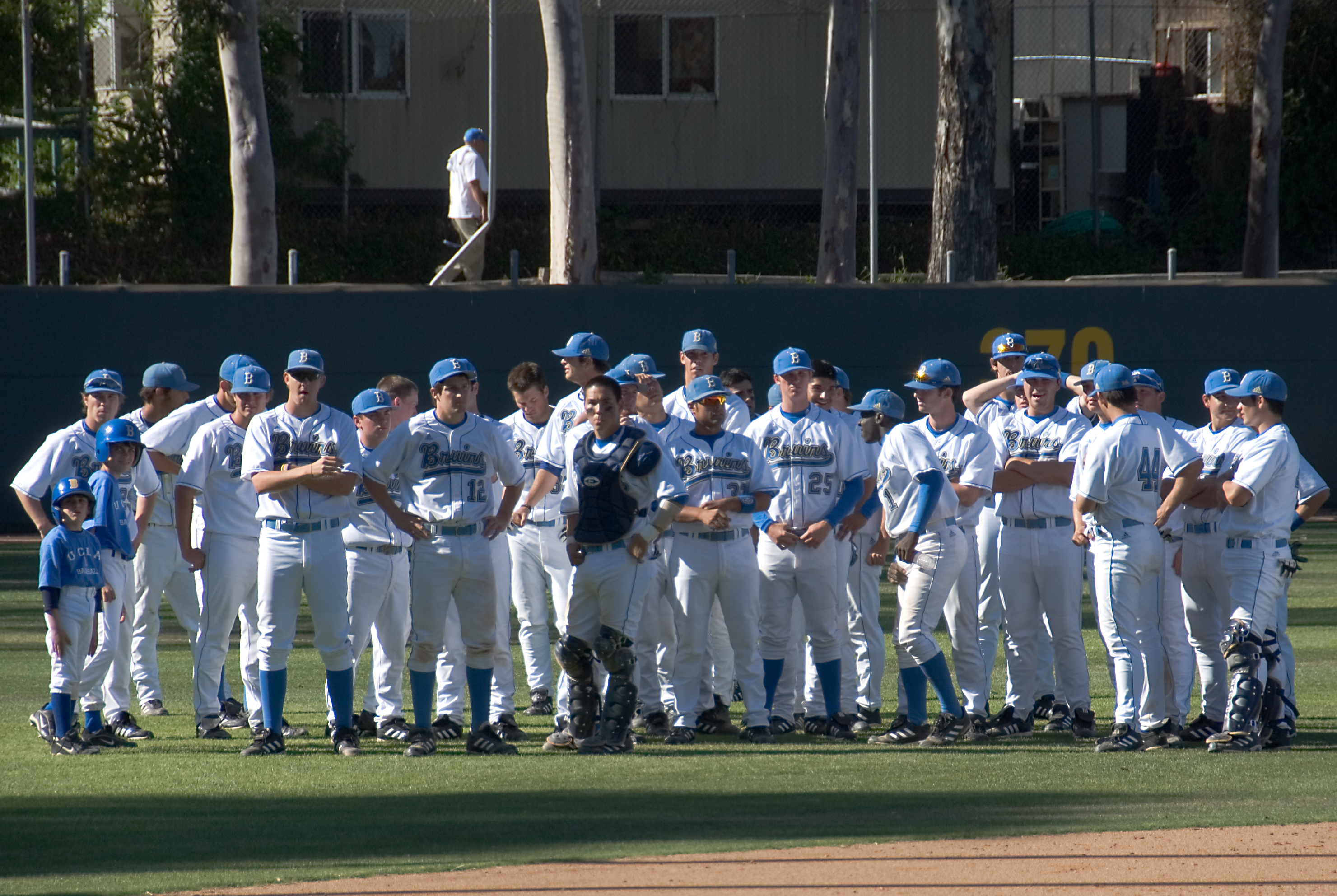
The Bruins baseball team gathering in the outfield at Jackie Robinson Stadium in 2007

The 2010 team, under head coach John Savage, won the Los Angeles Regional and Super-Regional, and was the first team to win 48 games in a season. The Bruins joined seven other teams in the 2010 College World Series and finished in second place, behind the University of South Carolina Gamecocks. The 2011 team won the Pac-10 Conference title.

The 2013 team won UCLA's 109th NCAA Championship and their first in baseball in the 2013 College World Series by beating Mississippi State 3–1 and 8–0.

Many UCLA baseball players have gone on to play in Major League Baseball (MLB). In the 2009 World Series, Chase Utley hit two home runs to help the Philadelphia Phillies win Game 1. There were a total of four former UCLA baseball players in the 2009 playoffs: Philadelphia's Ben Francisco and Chase Utley, Colorado's Garrett Atkins, and St. Louis' Troy Glaus, who was the 2002 World Series MVP for the Los Angeles Angels of Anaheim. Chris Chambliss and Gerrit Cole were No. 1 overall picks in the MLB drafts. Trevor Bauer was drafted as the No. 3 pick by the Arizona Diamondbacks on June 6, 2011. Former UCLA shortstop Brandon Crawford hit a grand-slam home run in his major-league debut with the San Francisco Giants on May 27, 2011, and helped the Giants to win the 2012 Major League World Series. Cole debuted with the Pittsburgh Pirates by winning his first four games he pitched and also drove in two runs with a single in his first at-bat in the 2013 MLB season.

=== Basketball (men) ===
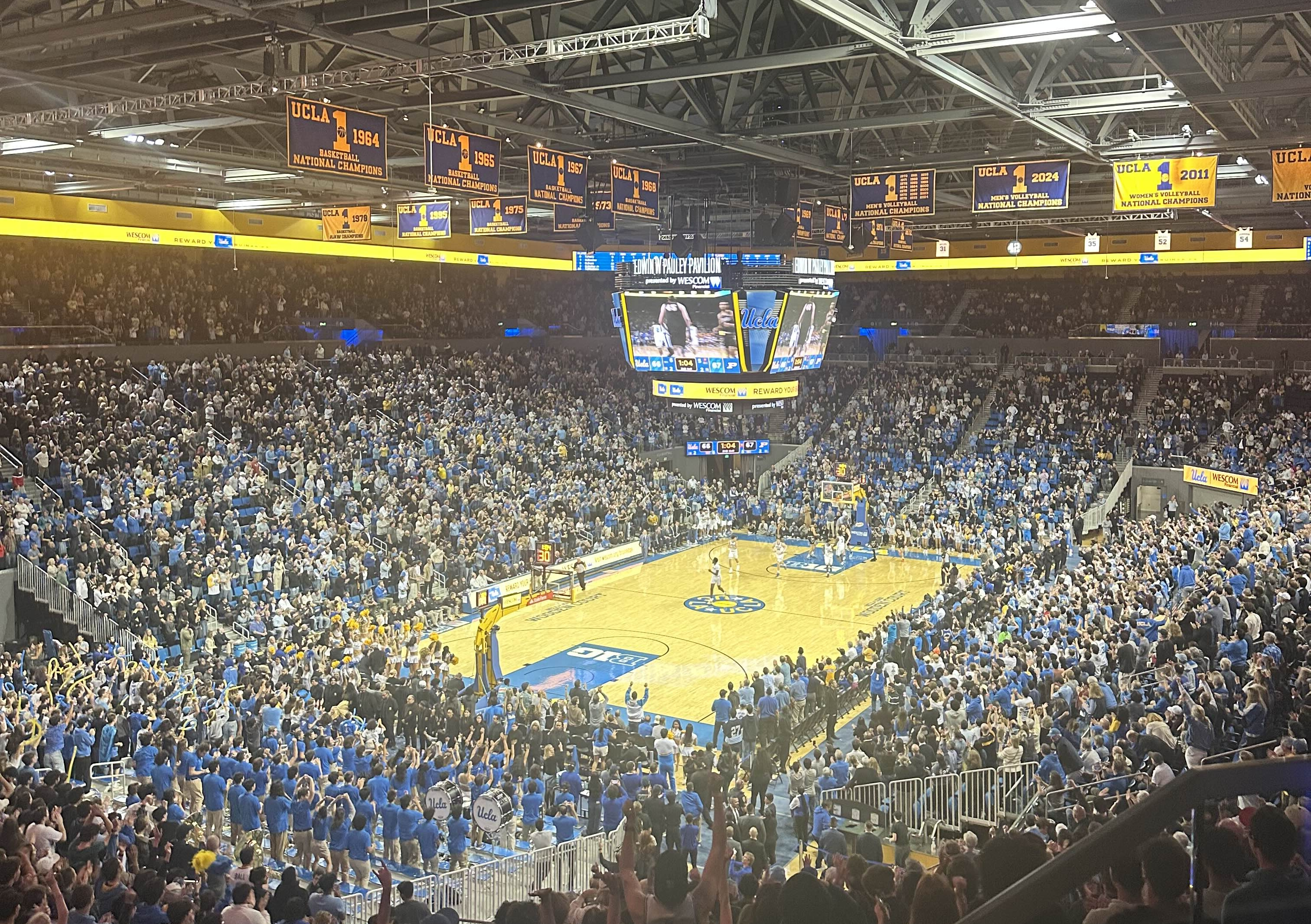
#4 Purdue Boilermakers vs. UCLA, January 20th, 2026.

Several of the most revered championships were won by the Men's Basketball team under coaches John Wooden and Jim Harrick. The rich legacy of UCLA basketball has produced 11 NCAA championships – 1964, 1965, 1967, 1968, 1969, 1970, 1971, 1972, 1973, 1975, and 1995. From 1971 to 1974, UCLA won 88 consecutive men's basketball games, an NCAA record for men. Recent UConn Huskies women's basketball teams have set overall NCAA basketball records with 90-game and (ongoing) 91-game winning streaks. The 35-year period (1940–1974) preceding and including the UCLA streak was characterized by less dynasties, however: 20 different men's teams won titles during that span. In comparison, the women's game to date has produced 35% less (tournament) parity, with 13 schools winning all 35 titles offered since its inception.

Past rosters of UCLA basketball teams have included greats such as Rafer Johnson who was the 1960 Olympic Decathlon Champion, Gail Goodrich, Kareem Abdul-Jabbar (then known as Lew Alcindor), Bill Walton, Reggie Miller and Walt Hazzard. The Bruins also had a winning record for 54 consecutive seasons from the 1948–1949 season to the 2001–2002 season.

In recent years, UCLA Men's Basketball was returned to prominence under Coach Ben Howland. Between 2006 and 2008, UCLA has been to three consecutive Final Fours, while UCLA's players have received numerous awards, most notably Arron Afflalo, a 2007 First-Team All American and the Pac-10 Player of the Year, and Kevin Love, a 2008 First-Team All American and the Pac-10 Player of the Year. UCLA has produced the most NBA Most Valuable Player Award winners, six of them by Abdul-Jabbar and one by Walton, who was Abdul-Jabbar's successor.

In March 2013, UCLA relieved head men's basketball coach Ben Howland of his duties after UCLA dropped an 83–63 decision to Minnesota in a second-round game of the NCAA tournament. The current head coach is Mick Cronin, former head coach at Cincinnati.

=== Basketball (women) ===
In the 1977–78 season, the women's basketball team, with a 27–2 record, were the AIAW Champions under head coach Billie Moore. The 2014–15 team won the 2015 WNIT championship by defeating the West Virginia Mountaineers 62–60 on April 4, 2015. In the 2024-2025 season, the UCLA women's basketball team made it to the NCAA final four for the first time in program history (having done so in the AIAW in 1978 and 1979), under coach Cori Close. In the 2025-2026 season, UCLA women's basketball again reached the final four under coach Close and won the National Championship by beating Texas 51-44 and South Carolina 79-51.

=== Women's beach volleyball ===
The UCLA Bruins women's beach volleyball team plays in the Mountain Pacific Sports Federation, which they joined for the 2025 season. Prior to that, UCLA competed in the Pacific-12 Conference. UCLA launched its beach volleyball program in 2013.

Women's National Championships: 2018, 2019, 2026
The beach volleyball team won its first national title on May 6, 2018, by defeating Hawaii and Florida State at Gulf Beach Place, Gulf Shores, Alabama. They repeated one year later on May 5, 2019, defeating rivals USC to win the National Championship. They won their third championship on May 3, 2026, defeating Stanford.

=== Cross country ===
The UCLA Bruins men's cross country team appeared in the NCAA Cross Country Championship thirteen times, with their highest finish being 5th place in the 1980–81 and 1981–82 school years. The UCLA Bruins women's cross country team appeared in the NCAA Cross Country Championship eleven times, with their highest finish being 6th place in the 1985–86 school year.

Year	Gender	Ranking	Points
1979	Men	No. 15	386
1980	Men	No. 5	207
1981	Men	No. 5	187
1982	Men	No. 9	250
1983	Men	No. 20	361
1985	Men	No. 12	283
1985	Women	No. 6	200
1986	Women	No. 11	226
1988	Women	No. 13	273
1998	Women	No. 28	574
1999	Women	No. 30	631
2001	Women	No. 21	539
2002	Women	No. 25	568
2003	Women	No. 7	293
2004	Women	No. 27	640
2006	Men	No. 23	546
2008	Men	No. 26	576
2012	Men	No. 13	376
2014	Men	No. 18	454
2014	Women	No. 27	582
2015	Men	No. 14	429
2016	Men	No. 15	378
2016	Women	No. 28	596
2017	Men	No. 21	485

=== Football ===
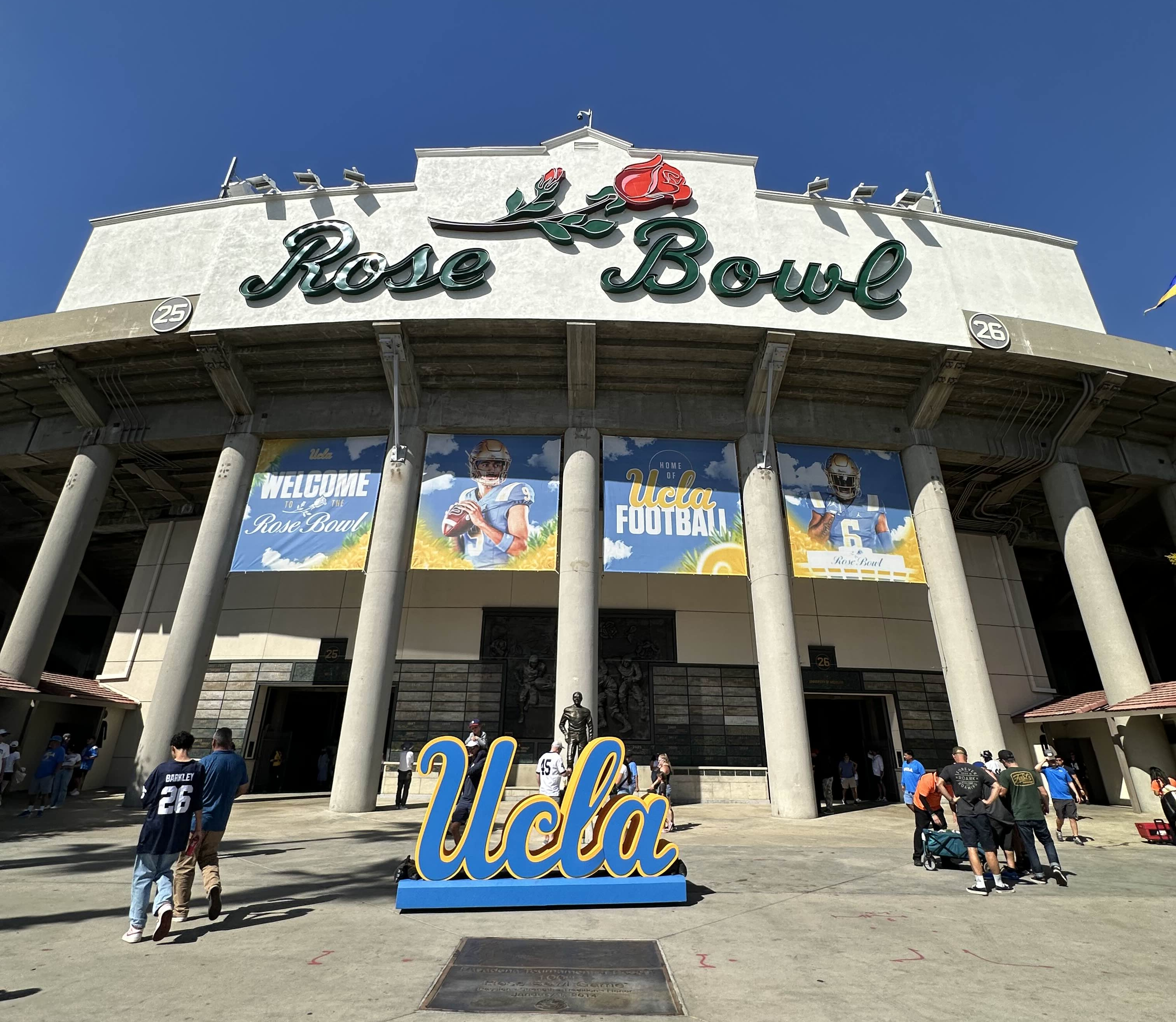
The front of the Rose Bowl, dressed up for a UCLA football game.

In 1954, the UCLA football team earned a share of the national title with a 9–0 record and a #1 ranking in the Coaches UPI football poll, while Ohio State was ranked No. 1 in the AP Poll. Owing to rules in place at the time, UCLA was unable to face off against Ohio State in the Rose Bowl, which would have resulted in one or the other being declared national champion. The Bruins have played in the Rose Bowl Game 12 times, winning 5 of them. The Bruins have won or shared the conference title 17 times. Among the many former UCLA football stars are Jackie Robinson (better known for his exploits as a baseball player, but nevertheless a 4-sport letterman and All-American), Heisman Trophy winner Gary Beban, Bob Waterfield, Troy Aikman, Carnell Lake, and Tommy Maddox. One of the great moments in recent history for the Bruins came on December 2, 2006, when they beat USC 13–9 in one of the greatest upsets in the rivalry. The Bruins are the Pac-12 Conference South Division Champions for two years in a row and played in both the 2011 and 2012 Pac-12 Football Championship Games.

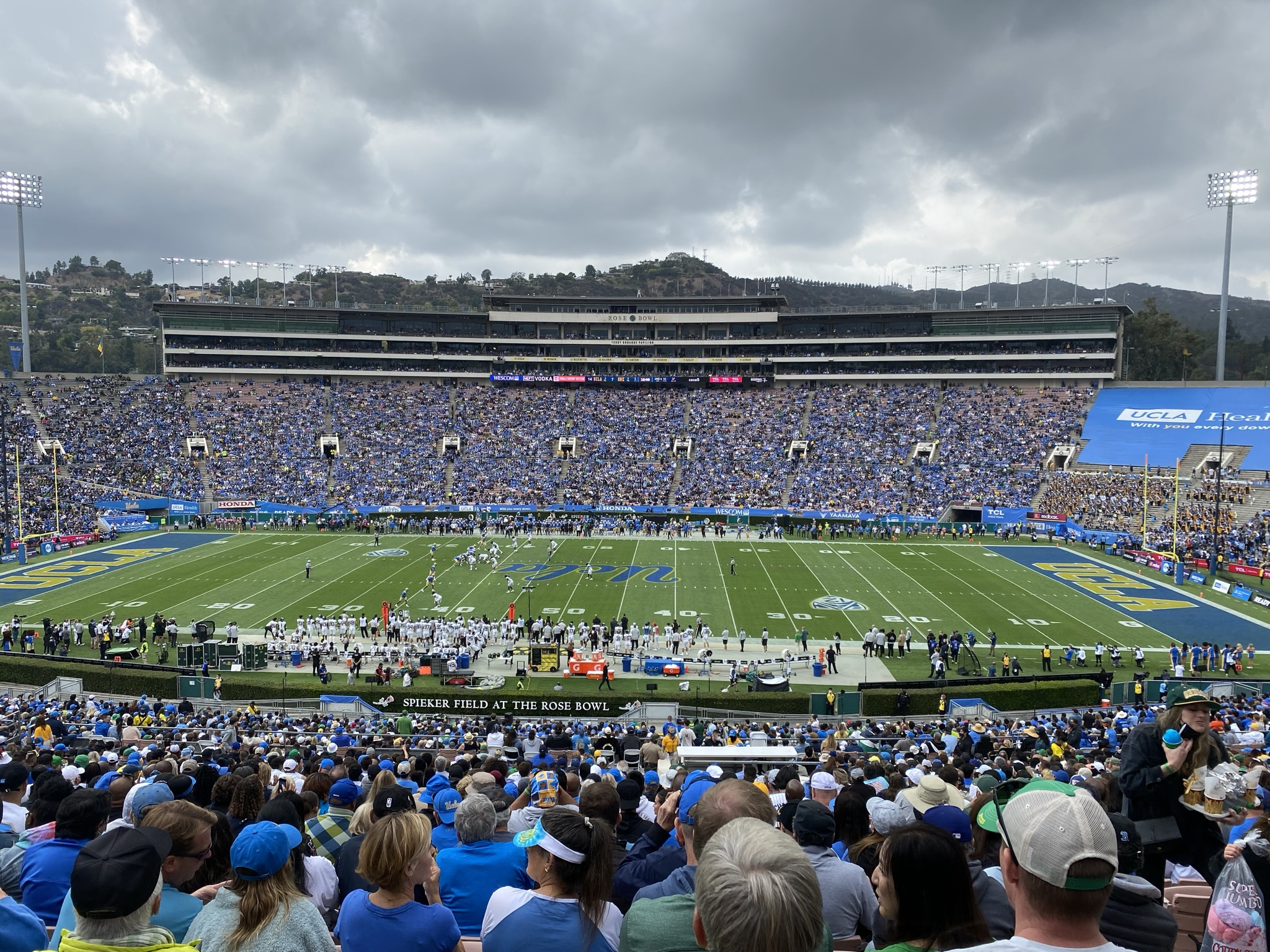
UCLA vs Oregon, at the Rose Bowl, Pasadena, 2021

UCLA became the first school to have a top winner in both basketball and football in the same year with Gary Beban winning the Heisman Trophy and Lew Alcindor (now Kareem Abdul-Jabbar) winning the U.S. Basketball Writers Association player of the year award in 1968.

15 football players and coaches have been inducted into the College Football Hall of Fame, John Sciarra being the latest inductee in the Class of 2014. A notable player and alumnus of the UCLA football team is current NCIS star, actor Mark Harmon. Winner of the "all-around excellence" award, Harmon led his team to victory several times as the quarterback.

The current head coach is Bob Chesney. Chesney replaced fired coach DeShaun Foster on December 6th, 2025.

The UCLA Bruins men's football team have an NCAA Division I FBS Tournament record of 16–20–1 through thirty-six appearances.

Season	Coach	Bowl	Opponent	Result
1942	Edwin Horrell	Rose Bowl	Georgia	L 0–9
1946	Bert LaBrucherie	Rose Bowl	Illinois	L 14–45
1953	Henry Sanders	Rose Bowl	Michigan State	L 20–28
1955	Henry Sanders	Rose Bowl	Michigan State	L 14–17
1961	William Barnes	Rose Bowl	Minnesota	L 3–21
1965	Tommy Prothro	Rose Bowl	Michigan State	W 14–12
1975	Dick Vermeil	Rose Bowl	Ohio State	W 23–10
1976	Terry Donahue	Liberty Bowl	Alabama	L 6–36
1978	Terry Donahue	Fiesta Bowl	Arkansas	T 10–10
1981	Terry Donahue	Bluebonnet Bowl	Michigan	L 14–33
1982	Terry Donahue	Rose Bowl	Michigan	W 24–14
1983	Terry Donahue	Rose Bowl	Illinois	W 45–9
1984	Terry Donahue	Fiesta Bowl	Miami (FL)	W 39–37
1985	Terry Donahue	Rose Bowl	Iowa	W 45–28
1986	Terry Donahue	Freedom Bowl	BYU	W 31–10
1987	Terry Donahue	Aloha Bowl	Florida	W 20–16
1988	Terry Donahue	Cotton Bowl	Arkansas	W 17–3
1991	Terry Donahue	Hancock Bowl	Illinois	W 6–3
1993	Terry Donahue	Rose Bowl	Wisconsin	L 16–21
1995	Terry Donahue	Aloha Bowl	Kansas	L 30–51
1997	Bob Toledo	Cotton Bowl	Texas A&M	W 29–23
1998	Bob Toledo	Rose Bowl	Wisconsin	L 31–38
2000	Bob Toledo	Sun Bowl	Wisconsin	L 20–21
2002	Bob Toledo	Las Vegas Bowl	New Mexico	W 27–13
2003	Karl Dorrell	Silicon Valley Bowl	Fresno State	L 9–17
2004	Karl Dorrell	Las Vegas Bowl	Wyoming	L 21–24
2005	Karl Dorrell	Sun Bowl	Northwestern	W 50–38
2006	Karl Dorrell	Emerald Bowl	Florida State	L 27–44
2007	Karl Dorrell	Las Vegas Bowl	BYU	L 16–17
2009	Rick Neuheisel	EagleBank Bowl	Temple	W 30–21
2011	Rick Neuheisel	Hunger Bowl	Illinois	L 14–20
2012	Jim Mora	Holiday Bowl	Baylor	L 26–49
2013	Jim Mora	Sun Bowl	Virginia Tech	W 42–12
2014	Jim Mora	Alamo Bowl	Kansas State	W 40–35
2015	Jim Mora	Foster Farms Bowl	Nebraska	L 29–37
2017	Jim Mora	Cactus Bowl	Kansas State	L 17–35
2022	Chip Kelly	Sun Bowl	Pittsburgh	L 35-37
2023	Chip Kelly	LA Bowl	Boise State	W 35–22

=== Golf ===
The UCLA Bruins men's golf team has won two NCAA Championships, in 1988 and 2008. In the 2008 national championship, the team was led by senior Kevin Chappell, who won the respective individual title. In that championship, UCLA won by one shot over USC, and by two shots over Stanford. In 2009, UCLA came first in the NCAA Central Regional, pulling off their third regional championship in the last seven years. With that victory, the defending national champions, advanced to their seventh consecutive NCAA Championship, a school record. For 2011, the Bruins were first in stroke play before losing in the match play of the national championship tournament; and freshman golfer Patrick Cantlay was named GCAA Division I Jack Nicklaus National Player of the Year Award, the fourth player from UCLA. Cantlay was also the National Freshman of the Year, winning the Phil Mickelson Award in addition to being the Pac-10 Player of the Year and Freshman of the Year. Chappell won National Player of the Year in 2008, Corey Pavin in 1982 and Duffy Waldorf in 1985. At the 2011 U.S. Open, Chappell was the low American (tie with Robert Garrigus) and Cantlay was the low amateur. The team has won five Pac-12 Conference championships: 1982, 1983, 1985, 2003, 2006 and has had numerous individual conference champions the first of which was Peter Laszlo in 1970. They won the Big Ten Conference championship in 2025 and 2026.

The women's team won the national championship in 1971 (DGWS), 1991, 2004 and 2011. In 2014, sophomore Alison Lee won the inaugural ANNIKA Award, which was created to honor the women's collegiate player of the year as chosen by a vote of coaches, college golfers, and members of the media. In 2016, junior Bronte Law won the prestigious award as well. The women's program also has many notable professional alumnae on tour, including British Open Champion Mo Martin, Sydnee Michaels, and Mariajo Uribe.

Former Bruin golf professionals include Scott McCarron, John Merrick, Corey Pavin, and Duffy Waldorf. Bruin alum Brandt Jobe tied for second at the 2011 Memorial Tournament. Maiya Tanaka, a member of the UCLA Women's Golf team from 2007 to 2009, competed with her sister Misa on The Amazing Race 20.

=== Gymnastics ===
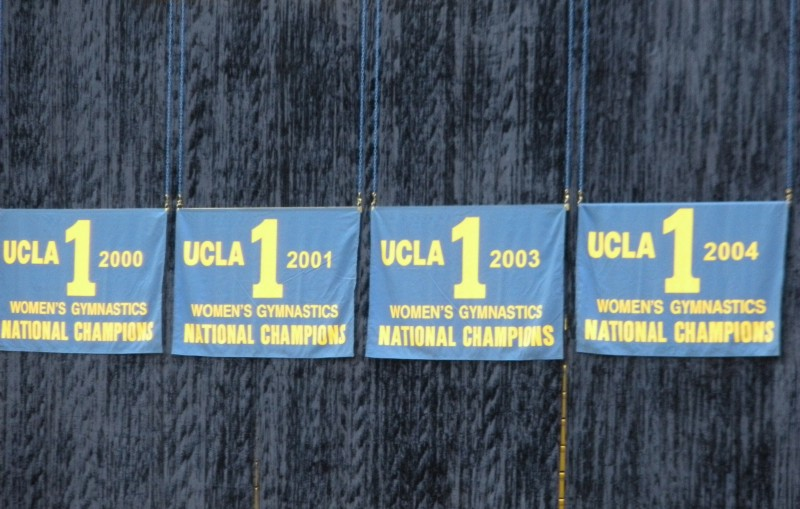
NCAA Gymnastics Championship banners

The women's gymnastics team has won seven NCAA Women's Gymnastics championships under head coach Valorie Kondos Field, including championships in 1997, 2000, 2001, 2003, 2004, 2010, and 2018. Two NCAA Men's Gymnastics championships (1984 and 1987) were won by the men's team before the program was discontinued.

Some notable former UCLA gymnasts include current stuntwoman Heidi Moneymaker, Brian Ginsberg who was a two-time US junior national gymnastics champion, and U.S. Olympic Team members Jordan Chiles, Madison Kocian, Kyla Ross, Samantha Peszek, Jamie Dantzscher, Mohini Bhardwaj, Kate Richardson, Tasha Schwikert, Kristen Maloney, Yvonne Tousek, Stella Umeh, Luisa Portocarrero, Tim Daggett, Mitch Gaylord, and Peter Vidmar. 2008 Canadian Olympic Gymnastics team member Elyse Hopfner-Hibbs attended UCLA and was a member of the team for the 2008–2009 season. The team took home its 15th Pac-10 Gymnastics Championship on March 27, 2009. Most recently, on April 23, 2010, the team won their 6th National Championship in Gainesville, Florida; the win brought the total number of national championships for UCLA to 105.

At the 2015 NCAA national championship, Samantha Peszek was the All Around co-champion and the balance beam champion.

At the 2018 NCAA national championship, Christine 'Peng Peng' Lee and Katelyn Ohashi won individual event titles on balance beam and floor exercise, respectively along with the team title.

=== Rugby union ===
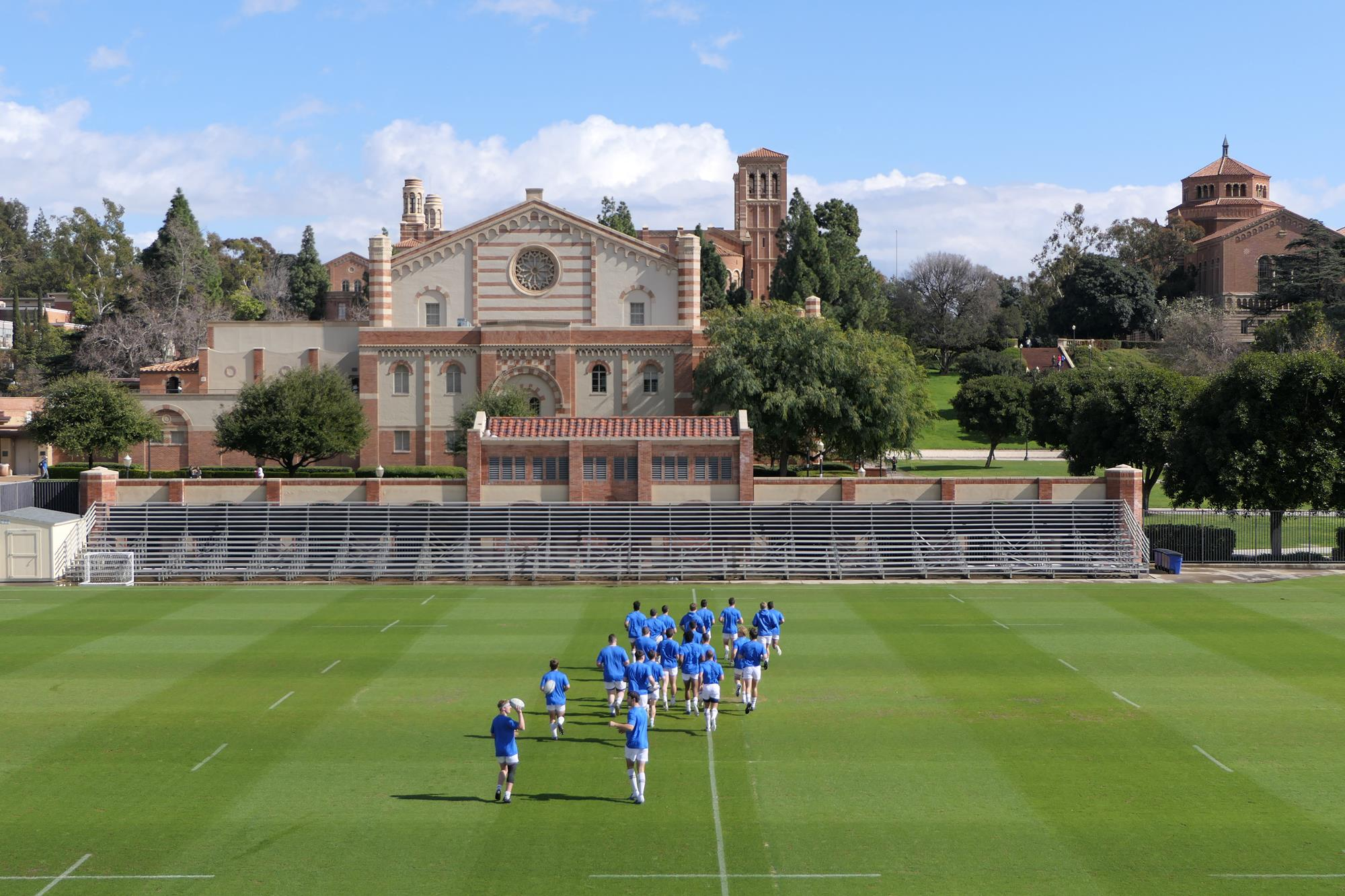
The UCLA Men's Rugby Team plays their home games at the Wallis Annenberg stadium

Since 1934, the UCLA Rugby Union Team has earned a reputation as a top level program in California, North America and around the world.

James Schaeffer introduced the original team in 1934, which was eventually revived post-WWII through Norm Padgett and his tireless hustling and fraternity walks. In 1958, Padgett's former Captain, Ged Gardner, assumed the Coaching role from until 1965. Gardner built membership, interest and skill to which Coach Dennis Storer added his own unique style. Dennis Storer remained Head Coach from 1966 - 1982, when the program operated as a Varsity Sport, winning a national title in 1972 and then another in 1975. Rugby was dropped as a varsity sport shortly after by the Athletics department. Storer subsequently resumed the role from 1987 to 1989 after the program was downgraded to Club Status. During his tenure, Storer guided the program to 2 Monterey National Championship Titles, numerous Southern California Titles, 2 national championship titles, and produced 14 USA Eagles with himself being named the first ever USA Eagles Coach.

Over its history, 19 UCLA students have gone on to represent the USA Rugby Men's National Team with Coach Dennis Storer being the first ever coach of the team. Coach Dennis Storer was recognized for his contributions to USA Rugby with his inclusion in the UCLA Athletics Hall of Fame and the USA Rugby Hall of Fame.

List of UCLA Alumni who have a cap for the USA Eagles

Name	Capped
Denis Storer	1976 (Coach)
Craig Sweeny	1972
Steve Gray	1981
Tommy Smith	1981
Dennis Murphy	1971
Ron Nisbet	1971
Stephen Auerbach	1972
David Stephenson	1972
Terry Scott	1973
Dave Briley	1974
Jaime Grant	1975
Skip Niebauer	1976
Dennis Jablonski	1976
Rob Duncanson	1977
Del Chipman	1980
John Fowler	1983
Chip Howard	1980
Russ Ortiz	1988
Benjamin Broselle	2019 (7s)
Lucas Lacamp	2021 (7s)

Currently, the Bruins compete in all of the Major National Domestic competitions including the PAC Rugby Conference (XV's & 7's), USAR Collegiate National Championships, and the Collegiate Rugby 7s Championships (7's). Recently, the Bruins have reached the 1/4 Final of the Varsity Cup (2011–17), the Collegiate Rugby Championships Final (2016 & 18), Semi-final (2013 & 14) Quarter-Final (2017) and were Plate winners in 2015. The Bruins have also won the El Nino 7's 2015, UCLA 7's 2016 and the West Coast 7's title at San Luis Obispo in 2013 & 2014 by defeating California in the Championship on each occasion (the only team in the country to defeat California in 7's rugby over that time period).

=== Soccer ===
Men

Since the beginning of the men's soccer tournament in 1959, UCLA has won national championship in 1985, 1990, 1997, and 2002; and finished second in 1970, 1972, 1973, and 2006. The men's soccer team won the 2008 Pacific-10 Conference championship and received the conference's automatic bid in the NCAA national championship Tournament, their 26 consecutive appearances. The conference title makes it the sixth title in 9 years. In 2023, the team became the PAC-12 Conference Champions.

Three UCLA alumni – Frankie Hejduk, Sigi Schmid and Mike Lapper – helped the Columbus Crew to win its first-ever Major League Soccer title by defeating the New York Red Bulls 3–1 in the 2008 MLS Cup. Cobi Jones, USA's most capped national player, played for UCLA. Also, four former Bruin players, Carlos Bocanegra, Benny Feilhaber, Jonathan Bornstein and Marvell Wynne, were on the U.S. men's national team squad that defeated No. 1 ranked Spain in the 2009 FIFA Confederations Cup semi-final.

The team was involved in the 2019 college admissions bribery scandal as head coach Jorge Salcedo was arrested, and indicted by a federal grand jury in Boston for conspiracy to commit racketeering. His indictment charged Salcedo with taking $200,000 in bribes to help two students, one in 2016 and one in 2018, get admitted to UCLA using falsified soccer credential admission information. As a result, he was placed on leave by UCLA from his coaching position at the school. On March 21, 2019, it was announced that he had resigned. On April 21, 2020, it was announced that he had agreed to plead guilty to the charges against him.

The UCLA Bruins men's soccer team have an NCAA Division I Tournament record of 74–41 through forty-five appearances.

Year	Round	Opponent	Result
1968	Second Round	San Jose State	L 1–3
1970	Second Round; Quarterfinals; Semifinals; National Championship	San Francisco; Denver; Howard; Saint Louis	W 3–2; W 3–1; W 4–3; L 0–1
1971	Second Round; Quarterfinals	Chico State; San Francisco	W 5–1; L 2–6
1972	Second Round; Quarterfinals; Semifinals; National Championship	Washington; San Jose State; Cornell; Saint Louis	W 5–0; W 3–1; W 1–0; L 2–4
1973	Second Round; Quarterfinals; Semifinals; National Championship	Washington; San Francisco; Clemson; Saint Louis	W 3–0; W 3–1; W 2–1; L 1–2
1974	Second Round; Quarterfinals; Semifinals	San Jose State; San Francisco; Saint Louis	W 3–2; W 1–0; L 1–2
1975	Second Round	San Francisco	L 1–4
1976	Second Round	San Francisco	L 0–1
1977	Second Round; Quarterfinals	California; San Francisco	W 3–0; L 1–4
1980	Second Round	San Francisco	L 1–2
1983	First round	San Francisco	L 0–5
1984	First round Second Round; Third round Semifinals	Fresno State; San Francisco; Harvard; Clemson	W 2–1; W 1–0; W 2–0; L 1–4
1985	First round Second Round; Third round Semifinals; National Championship	California; UNLV; SMU; Evansville; American	W 3–1; W 1–0; W 2–0; W 3–1; W 1–0
1986	First round Second Round	CSU Fullerton; Fresno State	W 3–0; L 0–1
1987	First round Second Round; Third round	Fresno State; UNLV; San Diego State	W 1–0; W 1–0; L 1–2
1988	First round Second Round	San Diego State; Portland	W 2–1; L 0–2
1989	First round Second Round; Third round	San Diego State; Portland; Santa Clara	W 2–1; W 1–0; L 0–2
1990	Second Round; Third round Semifinals; National Championship	San Diego; SMU; NC State; Rutgers	W 2–1; W 2–0; W 1–0; W 1–0
1991	Second Round; Third round	Portland; Santa Clara	W 3–0; L 1–2
1992	Second Round	San Diego	L 1–2
1993	First round	San Diego	L 2–4
1994	First round Second Round; Third round Semifinals	UAB; SMU; Charleston; Indiana	W 3–2; W 4–2; W 3–2; L 1–4
1995	First round Second Round	Cal Poly; Santa Clara	W 2–1; L 1–2
1996	First round	CSU Fullerton	L 1–2
1997	First round Second Round; Third round Semifinals; National Championship	Santa Clara; Washington; Clemson; Indiana; Virginia	W 3–0; W 1–0; W 2–1; W 1–0; W 2–0
1998	First round Second Round	Fresno State; Creighton	W 2–1; L 0–2
1999	First round Second Round; Third round Semifinals	San Diego; Saint Louis; Virginia; Indiana	W 4–1; W 2–0; W 2–0; L 2–3
2000	First round	San Diego	L 0–1
2001	First round Second Round; Third round	Loyola Marymount; San Diego; SMU	W 3–2; W 4–0; L 0–1
2002	Second Round; Third round Quarterfinals; Semifinals; National Championship	Loyola Marymount; California; Penn State; Maryland; Stanford	W 4–2; W 3–2; W 7–1; W 2–1; W 1–0
2003	Second Round; Third round Quarterfinals	Tulsa; FIU; Indiana	W 3–2; W 2–0; L 1–2
2004	Second Round; Third round	Loyola Marymount; St. John's	W 3–0; L 1–2
2005	Second Round	SMU	L 0–3
2006	Second Round; Third round Quarterfinals; Semifinals; National Championship	Harvard; Clemson; Duke; Virginia; UC Santa Barbara	W 3–0; W 3–0; W 3–2; W 4–0; L 1–2
2007	First round Second Round	New Mexico; Santa Clara	W 1–0; L 1–3
2008	First round	Cal Poly	L 0–1
2009	Second Round; Third round Quarterfinals	Sacramento State; UC Santa Barbara; Wake Forest	W 2–1; W 2–1; L 0–2
2010	Second Round; Third round Quarterfinals	Sacramento State; Dartmouth; Louisville	W 4–1; W 2–1; L 4–5
2011	Second Round; Third round Quarterfinals; Semifinals	Delaware; Rutgers; Louisville; North Carolina	W 1–0; W 3–0; W 1–0; L 2–3
2012	Second Round	San Diego	L 2–5
2013	Second Round; Third round	Elon; Connecticut	W 4–0; L 3–4
2014	Second Round; Third round Quarterfinals; Semifinals; National Championship	San Diego; California; North Carolina; Providence; Virginia	W 2–1; W 3–2; W 4–3; W 3–2; L 0–1
2015	First round Second Round	Cal Poly; Seattle	W 2–0; L 0–1
2016	First round Second Round	Colgate; Louisville	W 4–2; L 1–2
2018	First round	Portland	L 0–1

Women

The women's soccer team has won the Pac-10 championships eight times since beginning play in 1993. It has appeared six times in the College Cup and made 12 appearances in the NCAA national championship Tournament. They finished second three times (2000, 2004, and 2005).

For the 2008 Women's Soccer Championships, the undefeated UCLA women's soccer team was named one of the four No. 1 seeds, the third time in program history. The Bruins advanced to the quarterfinals, where they defeated the Duke Blue Devils 6–1, to earn a spot in the College Cup semifinals.

During the 2011 FIFA Women's World Cup, former player Lauren Cheney played for the U.S. women's national team and scored against North Korea. She scored the first goal and assisted on the winning goal in the semi-final against France to lead the US to the finals.

The UCLA Bruins women's soccer team have an NCAA Division I Tournament record of 66–19 through twenty-two appearances.

Year	Round	Opponent	Result
1995	First round	Washington	L 1–2
1997	First round Second Round; Third round	Portland; SMU; Notre Dame	W 1–0; W 3–2; L 0–8
1998	Second Round	BYU	L 0–2
1999	Second Round; Third round	San Diego; Santa Clara	W 2–1; L 0–7
2000	Second Round; Third round Quarterfinals; Semifinals; National Championship	USC; Texas A&M; Clemson; Portland; North Carolina	W 3–0; W 4–0; W 2–1; W 1–0; L 1–2
2001	First round Second Round; Third round Quarterfinals	CSU Fullerton; Pepperdine; Dayton; Florida	W 3–0; W 2–1; W 3–1; L 0–1
2002	First round Second Round; Third round	Loyola Marymount; USC; Texas A&M	W 4–0; W 1–0; L 0–1
2003	First round Second Round; Third round Quarterfinals; Semifinals	San Diego; Pepperdine; Kansas; Penn State; North Carolina	W 2–0; W 2–0; W 1–0; W 4–0; L 0–3
2004	First round Second Round; Third round Quarterfinals; Semifinals; National Championship	Pepperdine; San Diego; Duke; Ohio State; Princeton; Notre Dame	W 1–0; W 3–0; W 2–0; W 1–0; W 2–0; L 1–2
2005	First round Second Round; Third round Quarterfinals; Semifinals; National Championship	Mississippi Valley State; Colorado; Marquette; Virginia; Florida State; Portland	W 9–0; W 3–0; W 4–0; W 5–0; W 4–0; L 0–4
2006	First round Second Round; Third round Quarterfinals; Semifinals	UNLV; CSU Fullerton; Florida; Portland; North Carolina	W 6–1; W 3–1; W 3–2; W 2–1; L 0–2
2007	First round Second Round; Third round Quarterfinals; Semifinals	CSU Fullerton; Oklahoma State; Virginia; Portland; USC	W 3–1; W 4–0; W 2–1; W 3–2; L 1–2
2008	First round Second Round; Third round Quarterfinals; Semifinals	Fresno State; San Diego; USC; Duke; North Carolina	W 5–0; W 1–0; W 1–0; W 6–1; L 0–1
2009	First round Second Round; Third round Quarterfinals; Semifinals	Boise State; San Diego State; Virginia; Portland; Stanford	W 7–1; W 5–0; W 3–0; W 2–1; L 1–2
2010	First round Second Round; Third round	BYU; UCF; Stanford	W 1–0; W 2–1; L 0–3
2011	First round Second Round	New Mexico; San Diego	W 1–0; L 1–2
2012	First round Second Round; Third round Quarterfinals	Wisconsin; Kentucky; San Diego State; Stanford	W 1–0; W 5–0; W 3–0; L 1–2
2013	First round Second Round; Third round Quarterfinals; Semifinals; National Championship	San Diego State; Kentucky; Stanford; North Carolina; Virginia; Florida State	W 3–0; W 3–0; W 2–0; W 1–0; W 2–1; W 1–0
2014	First round Second Round; Third round Quarterfinals	San Diego; Harvard; Pepperdine; Virginia	W 5–0; W 7–0; W 1–0; L 1–2
2016	First round Second Round; Third round	Seattle; Nebraska; West Virginia	W 3–0; W 2–0; L 1–2
2017	First round Second Round; Third round Quarterfinals; Semifinals; National Championship	San Diego State; Northwestern; Virginia; Princeton; Duke; Stanford	W 3–1; W 1–0; W 2–1; W 3–1; W 1–0; L 2–3
2018	First round Second Round; Third round Quarterfinals	San Jose State; Minnesota; NC State; North Carolina	W 5–0; W 5–0; W 5–0; L 2–3

=== Softball ===
The Bruins have been 13-time NCAA champions, including the first one in 1982. Since then, they were second 7 times in the Women's College World Series (WCWS), last one in 2005.

They won the World Series in 1978, 1982, 1984, 1985, 1988, 1989, 1990, 1992, 1999, 2003, 2004, 2010 and 2019. The 2010 and 2019 titles were guided by head coach Kelly Inouye-Perez, a former player and assistant coach.

Former Bruin Natasha Watley went on to help the United States women's national softball team win a gold medal in the 2004 Olympics and a silver medal in 2008. Andrea Duran helped Team USA win a gold medal at the 2006 ISF World championship and a silver medal at the 2008 Olympics. Other famous Bruin players include Lisa Fernandez (two time NCAA Champion and three time Olympic gold medalist) and Dot Richardson (NCAA Champion [1982] and Olympic medal winner).

=== Swimming and diving ===
UCLA's Men's Swim Team won 41 individual national championships, a team championship in 1982, had a runner-up finish in '81, and sent 16 alumni to the Olympics. Although the men's team was cut in 1994, the women's team currently trains at Spieker Aquatics Center under head coach Jordan Wolfrum.

=== Tennis ===
The only school to have competed in every NCAA Men's Tennis Tournament, the team has won 16 national championships and 37 Pac-12 conference titles. Coach Billy Martin, who played at UCLA, has a 14 straight top 5 NCAA team finishes and a 9 consecutive 20-win seasons. He was named ITA (Intercollegiate Tennis Association) division 1 National Coach of the Year and is a member of ITA Hall of Fame. The 1950 men's tennis team won UCLA's first-ever NCAA Championship. Anita Kanter won the US girls tennis championship in 1951 as an 18-year-old sophomore at UCLA, as well as the 1951 National Hard Court Doubles and Mixed Doubles championships.

In 2014, Marcos Giron became the school's 11th NCAA Men's Tennis Singles Champion, joining Jack Tidball (1933), Herbert Flam (1950), Larry Nagler (1960), Allen Fox (1961), Arthur Ashe (1965), Charles Pasarell (1966), Jeff Borowiak (1970), Jimmy Connors (1971), Billy Martin (1975), and Benjamin Kohllöffel (2006). Mackenzie McDonald claimed the school's 12th individual singles championship and the school's 12th doubles individual championship when he teamed with Martin Redlicki at the 2016 tournament. On May 28, 2018, Redlicki teamed with Evan Zhu for the school's 13th doubles championship.

The women's team, which won national championships in 1981 (AIAW), 2008 and 2014, is coached by Stella Sampras, the sister of Pete Sampras, who donated a scholarship at UCLA. Number of players have won the individual titles, including Keri Phebus (1995 Singles), Fangran Tian (2023 Singles), Heather Ludloff and Lynn Lewis (1982 Doubles), Allison Cooper and Stella Sampras (1988 Doubles), Mamie Ceniza and Iwalani McCalla (1992 Doubles), Keri Phebus and Susie Starrett (1995 Doubles), Daniela Bercek and Lauren Fisher (2004 Doubles), and Tracy Lin and Riza Zalameda (2008 Doubles).

On May 25, 2019, the Bruins took both the men's and women's NCAA tennis doubles championships with Gabby Andrews and Ayan Broomfield the women's champions, and Maxime Cressy and Keegan Smith the men's champions.

UCLA alumni in the ATP included Jimmy Connors, Arthur Ashe, Eliot Teltscher, Brian Teacher, Peter Fleming, Fritz Buehning, Jeff Borowiak, and Jean-Julien Rojer.

Inducted into the Intercollegiate Tennis Association (ITA) Hall of Fame:

- Arthur Ashe (1983 – P)
- J. D. Morgan (1983 – P)
- William C. Ackerman (1984 – C)
- Jimmy Connors (1986 – P)
- Herbert Flam (1987 – P)
- Allen Fox (1988 – P/C)
- Frank Stewart (1992 – Con.)
- Jack Tidball (1992 – P)
- Glenn Bassett (1993 – C)
- Billy Martin (1996 – P)
- Ian Crookenden (1997 – P)
- Robert M. Perry (1997 – P)
- Peter Fleming (1998 – P)
- Brian Teacher (2001 – P)
- Larry Nagler (2004 – P)
- Jeff Borowiak (2006 – P)
- Ferdi Taygan (2006 – P)
- Jim Pugh (2008 – P)
- Brad Pearce (2009 – P)
- Roy Barth (2019 - P)

(P – Player, C – Coach, Con. – Contributor)

=== Track and field ===
- Men's Championships: 1956, 1966, 1971, 1972, 1973, 1978, 1987, 1988
- Women's Championships: 1975 (Outdoor), 1977 (Outdoor), 1982 (Outdoor), 1983 (Outdoor), 2000 (Indoor), 2001 (Indoor), 2004 (Outdoor)

The UCLA-USC Dual Meet Hall of Fame inducted Willie Banks (triple-jump), John Brenner (shot put), Wayne Collett (sprints) and Seilala Sua (shot put and discus) into the hall's first class in 2009.

Other notable team members are: Rafer Johnson, Dwight Stones, C. K. Yang.

When Meb Keflezighi was running for UCLA, he won four NCAA championships in one year, including the cross-country title, the 10,000 meters outdoors and the 5,000 meters indoors and outdoors titles in track. At the 2004 Olympics in Athens, Greece, Meb ran to a second-place finish and winning the silver medal in the marathon with a then personal-best time of 2:11.29. In 2009, he became the first American to win the New York City Marathon in 17 years. At the 2014 Boston Marathon, he became the first American to win the men's race since 1983 with the time of 2:08.37. He paid tribute to the victims of the Boston Marathon bombing by writing their names on his running bib.

=== Volleyball ===
==== Men's team ====
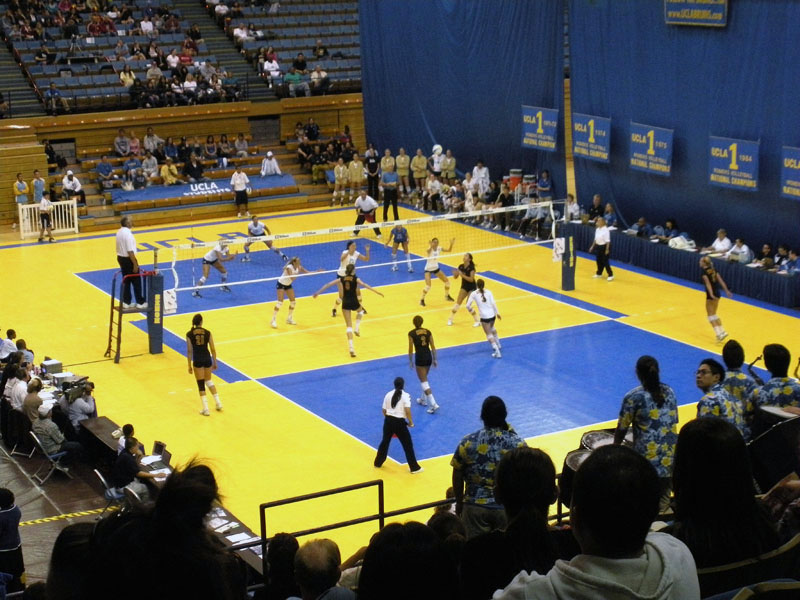
UCLA vs. USC in volleyball, 2008

Men's National Championships: 1953, 1954, 1956, 1965, 1967, 1970, 1971, 1972, 1974, 1975, 1976, 1979, 1981, 1982, 1983, 1984, 1987, 1989, 1993, 1995, 1996, 1998, 2000, 2006, 2023, 2024

The UCLA men's team won 21 NCAA titles, 19 under Al Scates, who coached the Bruins for 48 years. The Bruins also won 5 USVBA titles prior to the sport being sanctioned by the NCAA, two of these under Scates. John Speraw became head coach of the men's program following the retirement of Scates in 2012. Former player Karch Kiraly (1983) was inducted into the College Sports Information Directors of America (COSIDA) Academic All-America Hall of Fame.

==== Women's team ====
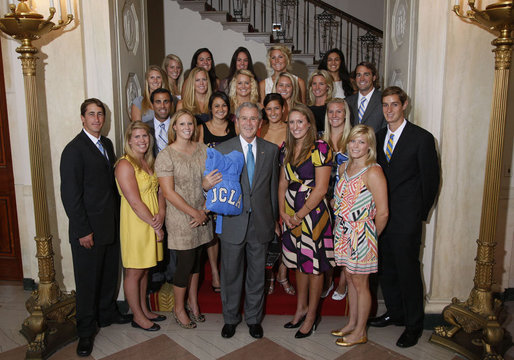
Women's National Championship Water Polo team at the White House, June 2008

Women's National Championships: 1972, 1974, 1975, 1984, 1990, 1991, 2011

Andy Banachowski led UCLA to six national championships (3 NCAA-1984, 1990, 1991; 2 AIAW-1974, 1975; and 1 DGWS-1972). The women's team played in 6 DGWS/AIAW championship games, has made 12 NCAA Final Four appearances, and has won 4 NCAA titles. Most recently, the women's team defeated Illinois to claim the 2011 NCAA title, twenty years after their previous title run.

The UCLA Bruins women's volleyball team have an NCAA Division I Tournament record of 90–32 through thirty-five appearances.

Year	Round	Opponent	Result
1981	Regional semifinals Regional Finals; Semifinals; National Championship	Purdue; Stanford; San Diego State; USC	W 3–2; W 3–2; W 3–1; L 2–3
1982	First round Regional semifinals Regional Finals	Louisville; BYU; San Diego State	W 3–0; W 3–0; L 1–3
1983	Regional semifinals Regional Finals; Semifinals; National Championship	Penn State; Western Michigan; Pacific; Hawaii	W 3–0; W 3–0; W 3–2; L 0–3
1984	Regional semifinals Regional Finals; Semifinals; National Championship	Duke; Texas; San Jose State; Stanford	W 3–0; W 3–1; W 3–0; W 3–2
1985	Regional semifinals Regional Finals; Semifinals	Georgia; Texas; Pacific	W 3–0; W 3–0; L 1–3
1986	First round	Loyola Marymount	L 2–3
1987	First round Regional semifinals	California; BYU	W 3–1; L 1–3
1988	First round Regional semifinals Regional Finals; Semifinals	California; BYU; Washington; Texas	W 3–0; W 3–0; W 3–0; L 0–3
1989	First round Regional semifinals Regional Finals; Semifinals	Pepperdine; Arizona; Wyoming; Nebraska	W 3–1; W 3–0; W 3–0; L 0–3
1990	First round Regional semifinals Regional Finals; Semifinals; National Championship	Gonzaga; New Mexico; Stanford; LSU; Pacific	W 3–0; W 3–1; W 3–0; W 3–0; W 3–0
1991	First round Regional semifinals Regional Finals; Semifinals; National Championship	Pepperdine; New Mexico; Stanford; Ohio State; Long Beach State	W 3–0; W 3–0; W 3–0; W 3–0; W 3–2
1992	First round Regional semifinals Regional Finals; Semifinals; National Championship	Ball State; Arizona State; BYU; Florida; Stanford	W 3–0; W 3–0; W 3–0; W 3–0; L 1–3
1993	Second Round; Regional semifinals Regional Finals	New Mexico; Stanford; BYU	W 3–0; W 3–1; L 0–3
1994	Second Round; Regional semifinals Regional Finals; Semifinals; National Championship	Georgia Tech; Duke; Houston; Penn State; Stanford	W 3–0; W 3–0; W 3–0; W 3–2; L 1–3
1995	Second Round; Regional semifinals Regional Finals	Ball State; Ohio State; Nebraska	W 3–0; W 3–0; L 0–3
1997	First round Second Round	Pepperdine; UC Santa Barbara	W 3–1; L 2–3
1998	First round Second Round	Virginia; UC Santa Barbara	W 3–1; L 1–3
1999	First round Second Round; Regional semifinals Regional Finals	Eastern Washington; Ohio State; Pepperdine; Penn State	W 3–0; W 3–0; W 3–0; L 0–3
2000	First round Second Round; Regional semifinals Regional Finals	Morgan State; Michigan State; Pacific; Wisconsin	W 3–0; W 3–2; W 3–1; L 2–3
2001	First round Second Round; Regional semifinals Regional Finals	Penn; Penn State; Hawaii; Long Beach State	W 3–0; W 3–0; W 3–1; L 0–3
2002	First round Second Round	Long Beach State; Pepperdine	W 3–0; L 1–3
2003	First round Second Round; Regional semifinals Regional Finals	San Diego; UC Irvine; Nebraska; USC	W 3–0; W 3–0; W 3–1; L 1–3
2004	First round Second Round; Regional semifinals Regional Finals	Loyola Marymount; Long Beach State; Penn State; Washington	W 3–1; W 3–0; W 3–1; L 2–3
2005	First round Second Round; Regional semifinals	Kansas; San Diego; Nebraska	W 3–1; W 3–0; L 0–3
2006	First round Second Round; Regional semifinals Regional Finals; Semifinals	UAB; Utah; Oklahoma; Hawaii; Nebraska	W 3–0; W 3–0; W 3–0; W 3–0; L 1–3
2007	First round Second Round; Regional semifinals Regional Finals	Alabama A&M; Clemson; Oregon; Stanford	W 3–0; W 3–1; W 3–1; L 1–3
2008	First round Second Round; Regional semifinals	LSU; Duke; Texas	W 3–1; W 3–0; L 1–3
2009	First round Second Round	Long Beach State; Baylor	W 3–0; L 1–3
2010	First round Second Round	American; Texas	W 3–2; L 1–3
2011	First round Second Round; Regional semifinals Regional Finals; Semifinals; National Championship	UMES; San Diego; Penn State; Texas; Florida State; Illinois	W 3–0; W 3–1; W 3–0; W 3–1; W 3–0; W 3–1
2012	First round Second Round	LIU Brooklyn; Michigan State	W 3–0; L 1–3
2014	First round Second Round; Regional semifinals	LIU Brooklyn; Long Beach State; Penn State	W 3–0; W 3–0; L 0–3
2015	First round Second Round; Regional semifinals	Lipscomb; Michigan; Texas	W 3–0; W 3–2; L 1–3
2016	First round Second Round; Regional semifinals Regional Finals	Murray State; Baylor; North Carolina; Minnesota	W 3–1; W 3–0; W 3–1; L 0–3
2017	First round Second Round; Regional semifinals	Austin Peay; Cal Poly; Florida	W 3–0; W 3–1; L 1–3

=== Water polo ===
The women's team has captured 8 of the championships since it became an NCAA sponsored event. The Bruins defeated Cal for the 2024 title. They also won non-NCAA national titles in 1996, 1997, 1998 and 2000. The men's team were champions 14 times and as runner-up 10 times.

Four UCLA water polo alumni and former coach Guy Baker were members of the USA women's and men's teams participated in the 2008 Beijing Olympics. Natalie Golda (now Benson) and Jaime Hipp were members of the women's team, while Adam Wright and Brandon Brooks were on the men's team. Both teams won a silver medal.

Sean Kern, Coralie Simmons, Natalie Golda, Kelly Rulon, and Courtney Mathewson won many prestigious individual award in American collegiate water polo.

Peter J. Cutino Award winners, the top male and female NCAA water polo players:

Year	Winners
1999	Sean Kern
2000	Sean Kern
2001	Coralie Simmons
2004	Natalie Golda
2006	Kelly Rulon
2007	Courtney Mathewson
2015	Garrett Danner
2020	Nicolas Saveljic
2024	Ryder Dodd
2025	Ryder Dodd

The then No. 2-ranked men's water polo team opened the newest athletic facility at UCLA, the Spieker Aquatics Center, with a win over the No. 7-ranked UC Irvine Anteaters, 10–4, on Saturday, September 26, 2009. The center hosted the MPSF Women's Water Polo Championship Tournament April 30 – May 2, 2010 and the MPSF Men's Water Polo Championship Tournament November 25–27, 2011.

In 2009, the men's team defeated #1 ranked USC and #3 ranked California for the MPSF tournament championship to advance to the NCAA Men's Water Polo Championship. On February 28, 2010, the women's team played the longest match in NCAA women's water polo history, winning 7–6 over California at the UC Irvine Invitational.

On December 7, 2014, the men's team defeated 3rd-seed USC 9–8 to win its ninth NCAA national championship at UC San Diego's Canyonview Aquatic Center at La Jolla, California.

On December 6, 2015, the men's team once again defeated USC, 10–7, to win back-to-back NCAA championships and finish with a perfect season at 30–0 on the UCLA campus. Outstanding goalkeeper and MPSF Player of the Year Garrett Danner won the prestigious Cutino Award, the second Bruin to do so.

On October 9, 2016, the men's team defeated UC Davis to set an NCAA record of 52 straight wins.

On October 22, 2016, the men's team defeated the Cal Bears to improve their NCAA record to 54 straight wins.

On December 3, 2017, the men's team defeated rival Southern California, 7–5, to capture their third National Championship in four years. The win also pulled the Bruins even with fellow Pac-12 school Stanford University for the most NCAA team championships in school history, both schools with 114 each. Earlier in the day, the Cardinal had pulled ahead when their women's soccer team defeated the Bruins' women's team 3–2. The lead lasted less than six hours. Stanford, subsequently won their 115th NCAA team championship, in men's soccer.

On March 21, 2021, the men's team defeated Southern California, 7–6, in the national championship game to win the men's program's twelfth title.

The UCLA Bruins men's water polo team have an NCAA Division I Tournament record of 63–27 through thirty-five appearances.

In 2024, Sienna Green played for Australia in the 2024 Paris Olympics.

Year	Round	Opponent	Result
1969	First round Semifinals; National Championship	USC; Long Beach State; California	W 4–3; W 9–6; L 2–5
1970	First round Semifinals; National Championship	UC Santa Barbara; San Jose State; UC Irvine	W 7–6; W 7–4; L 6–7
1971	First round Semifinals; National Championship	Washington; Long Beach State; San Jose State	W 37–2; W 10–1; W 5–3
1972	First round Semifinals; National Championship	Yale; UC Irvine; San Jose State	W 21–3; W 15–10; W 10–5
1973	First round Semifinals	UC Santa Barbara; California	W 14–2; L 2–4
1974	First round Semifinals	Stanford; UC Irvine	W 9–5; L 3–5
1975	First round Semifinals	Army; California	W 26–2; L 9–13
1976	First round Semifinals; National Championship	Texas A&M; UC Irvine; Stanford	W 18–3; W 14–9; L 12–13
1979	First round Semifinals; National Championship	Bucknell; California; UC Santa Barbara	W 17–7; W 10–9; L 3–11
1981	First round	California	L 7–10
1982	First round Semifinals	UC Santa Barbara; Stanford	W 8–6; L 9–11
1983	First round	Long Beach State	L 8–10
1984	First round	Pepperdine	L 11–12
1985	First round Semifinals	Loyola (IL); UC Irvine	W 14–6; L 6–7
1986	First round Semifinals	Navy; California	W 13–7; L 8–11
1987	First round Semifinals	Pepperdine; USC	W 11–7; L 11–12
1988	First round Semifinals; National Championship	Navy; USC; California	W 11–3; W 13–10; L 11–14
1990	First round Semifinals	Pepperdine; California	W 10–9; L 8–10
1991	First round Semifinals; National Championship	UC San Diego; Pepperdine; California	W 14–10; W 6–5; L 6–7
1994	First round Semifinals	Pepperdine; Stanford	W 8–7; L 5–9
1995	Semifinals; National Championship	UC San Diego; California	W 21–10; L 8–10
1996	Semifinals; National Championship	UC Davis; USC	W 18–6; W 8–7
1999	Semifinals; National Championship	Massachusetts; Stanford	W 14–6; W 6–5
2000	Semifinals; National Championship	Navy; UC San Diego	W 12–5; W 11–2
2001	Semifinals; National Championship	Loyola Marymount; Stanford	W 7–5; L 5–8
2004	Semifinals; National Championship	Princeton; Stanford	W 7–5; W 10–9
2009	Semifinals; National Championship	Loyola Marymount; USC	W 9–8; L 6–7
2011	Semifinals; National Championship	UC San Diego; USC	W 10–1; L 4–7
2012	Semifinals; National Championship	St. Francis Brooklyn; USC	W 17–3; L 10–11
2014	Semifinals; National Championship	UC San Diego; USC	W 15–6; W 9–8
2015	Semifinals; National Championship	UC San Diego; USC	W 17–4; W 10–7
2016	Semifinals	California	L 8–9
2017	Semifinals; National Championship	Pacific; USC	W 11–9; W 7–5
2018	Quarterfinals; Semifinals	George Washington; USC	W 18–6; L 7–8
2020	Opening Round; Semifinals; National Championship	California Baptist; Stanford; USC	W 19–14; W 11–10; W 7–6

Coach of the Year

- Women's water polo: Adam Wright, 2024, 2025 (MPSF)

USA Water Polo Hall of Fame

- Natalie Golda Benson, 2015
- Rich Corso, a former UCLA swimming and water polo coach, 2015

== Championships ==
=== Summary ===
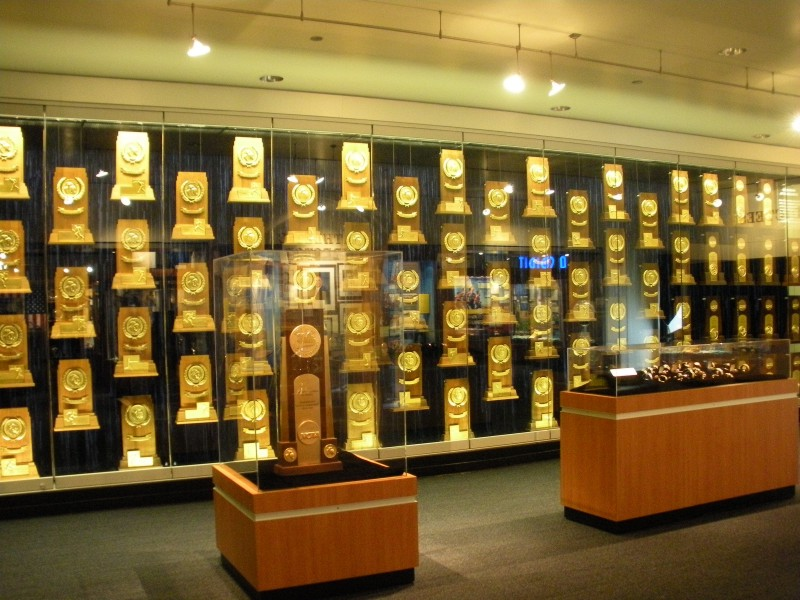
NCAA National Championship trophies, rings, watches won by UCLA teams

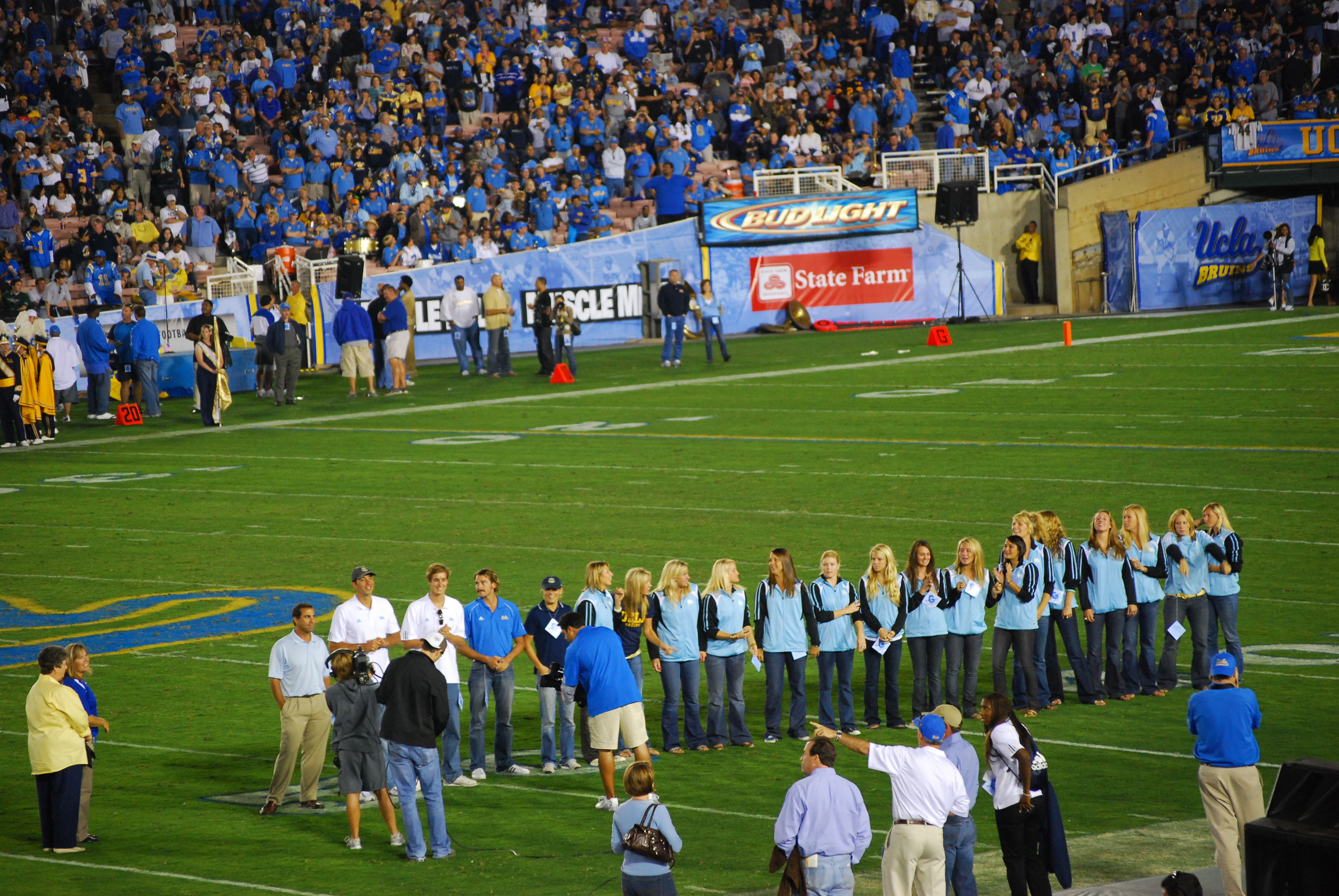
UCLA Women's Water Polo team honored for winning UCLA's 100th NCAA Championship, 2007

As of May 3, 2026, UCLA has won 127 NCAA team championships, second to Stanford's 139. The totals do not include any football championships at the FBS level.

UCLA secured three NCAA championships during the month of May 2008: on May 11 when UCLA defeated archrival USC, 6–3, for the Women's Water Polo Championship, on May 20 when the Bruins defeated California for the Women's Tennis Championship, and on May 31 when UCLA defeated archrivals Stanford and USC for the Men's Golf Championship.

=== Team ===
UCLA has won 127 NCAA championships at the Division I level.

- Men's (80)
  - Baseball (1): 2013
  - Basketball (11): 1964, 1965, 1967, 1968, 1969, 1970, 1971, 1972, 1973, 1975, 1995
  - Golf (2): 1998, 2008
  - Gymnastics (2): 1984, 1987
  - Outdoor Track & Field (8): 1956, 1966, 1971, 1972, 1973, 1978, 1987, 1988
  - Soccer (4): 1985, 1990, 1997, 2002
  - Swimming and diving (1): 1982
  - Tennis (16): 1950, 1952, 1953, 1954, 1956, 1960, 1961, 1965, 1970, 1971, 1975, 1976, 1979, 1982, 1984, 2005
  - Volleyball (21): 1970, 1971, 1972, 1974, 1975, 1976, 1979, 1981, 1982, 1983, 1984, 1987, 1989, 1993, 1995, 1996, 1998, 2000, 2006, 2023, 2024
  - Water polo (14): 1969, 1971, 1972, 1995, 1996, 1999, 2000, 2004, 2014, 2015, 2017, 2020, 2024, 2025
- Women's (47)
  - Basketball (1): 2026
  - Beach volleyball (3): 2018, 2019, 2026
  - Golf (3): 1991, 2004, 2011
  - Gymnastics (7): 1997, 2000, 2001, 2003, 2004, 2010, 2018
  - Indoor Track & Field (2): 2000, 2001
  - Outdoor Track & Field (3): 1982, 1983, 2004
  - Soccer (2): 2013, 2022
  - Softball (12): 1982, 1984, 1985, 1988, 1989, 1990, 1992, 1995 (vacated), 1999, 2003, 2004, 2010, 2019
  - Tennis (2): 2008, 2014
  - Volleyball (4): 1984, 1990, 1991, 2011
  - Water polo (8): 2001, 2003, 2005, 2006, 2007, 2008, 2009, 2024

=== Appearances ===
The UCLA Bruins competed in the NCAA tournament across 25 active sports (11 men's and 14 women's) 773 times at the Division I FBS level.

- Baseball (23): 1969, 1979, 1986, 1987, 1990, 1992, 1993, 1996, 1997, 1999, 2000, 2004, 2006, 2007, 2008, 2010, 2011, 2012, 2013, 2015, 2017, 2018, 2019
- Men's basketball (49): 1950, 1952, 1956, 1962, 1963, 1964, 1965, 1967, 1968, 1969, 1970, 1971, 1972, 1973, 1974, 1975, 1976, 1977, 1978, 1979, 1980, 1981, 1983, 1987, 1989, 1990, 1991, 1992, 1993, 1994, 1995, 1996, 1997, 1998, 1999, 2000, 2001, 2002, 2005, 2006, 2007, 2008, 2009, 2011, 2013, 2014, 2015, 2017, 2018, 2021, 2022, 2023
- Women's basketball (16): 1983, 1985, 1990, 1992, 1998, 1999, 2000, 2004, 2006, 2010, 2011, 2013, 2016, 2017, 2018, 2019
- Beach volleyball (7): 2016, 2017, 2018, 2019, 2021, 2022, 2023
- Men's cross country (13): 1979, 1980, 1981, 1982, 1983, 1985, 2006, 2008, 2012, 2014, 2015, 2016, 2017
- Women's cross country (11): 1985, 1986, 1988, 1998, 1999, 2001, 2002, 2003, 2004, 2014, 2016
- Football (36): 1942, 1946, 1953, 1955, 1961, 1965, 1975, 1976, 1978, 1981, 1982, 1983, 1984, 1985, 1986, 1987, 1988, 1991, 1993, 1995, 1997, 1998, 2000, 2002, 2003, 2004, 2005, 2006, 2007, 2009, 2011, 2012, 2013, 2014, 2015, 2017
- Men's golf (38): 1948, 1949, 1950, 1960, 1963, 1964, 1965, 1966, 1967, 1978, 1979, 1980, 1982, 1983, 1984, 1985, 1987, 1988, 1989, 1991, 1993, 1997, 1998, 2001, 2003, 2004, 2005, 2006, 2007, 2008, 2009, 2010, 2011, 2012, 2013, 2014, 2015, 2018
- Women's golf (31): 1982, 1985, 1986, 1987, 1988, 1990, 1991, 1992, 1993, 1994, 1995, 1996, 1997, 2001, 2002, 2003, 2004, 2005, 2006, 2007, 2008, 2009, 2010, 2011, 2012, 2013, 2014, 2015, 2016, 2018, 2019
- Women's gymnastics (36): 1982, 1983, 1984, 1986, 1987, 1988, 1989, 1990, 1992, 1993, 1994, 1995, 1996, 1997, 1998, 1999, 2000, 2001, 2002, 2003, 2004, 2005, 2006, 2007, 2008, 2009, 2010, 2011, 2012, 2013, 2014, 2015, 2016, 2017, 2018, 2019
- Rowing (4): 2010, 2012, 2013, 2014
- Men's soccer (45): 1968, 1970, 1971, 1972, 1973, 1974, 1975, 1976, 1977, 1980, 1983, 1984, 1985, 1986, 1987, 1988, 1989, 1990, 1991, 1992, 1993, 1994, 1995, 1996, 1997, 1998, 1999, 2000, 2001, 2002, 2003, 2004, 2005, 2006, 2007, 2008, 2009, 2010, 2011, 2012, 2013, 2014, 2015, 2016, 2018
- Women's soccer (23): 1995, 1997, 1998, 1999, 2000, 2001, 2002, 2003, 2004, 2005, 2006, 2007, 2008, 2009, 2010, 2011, 2012, 2013, 2014, 2016, 2017, 2018, 2019, 2022
- Softball (36): 1982, 1983, 1984, 1985, 1987, 1988, 1989, 1990, 1991, 1992, 1993, 1994, 1995, 1996, 1997, 1999, 2000, 2001, 2002, 2003, 2004, 2005, 2006, 2007, 2008, 2009, 2010, 2011, 2012, 2013, 2014, 2015, 2016, 2017, 2018, 2019, 2021, 2022, 2023, 2024
- Women's swimming and diving (38): 1982, 1983, 1984, 1985, 1986, 1987, 1988, 1989, 1990, 1991, 1992, 1993, 1994, 1995, 1996, 1997, 1998, 1999, 2000, 2001, 2002, 2003, 2004, 2005, 2006, 2007, 2008, 2009, 2010, 2011, 2012, 2013, 2014, 2015, 2016, 2017, 2018, 2019
- Men's tennis (42): 1977, 1978, 1979, 1980, 1981, 1982, 1983, 1984, 1985, 1986, 1987, 1988, 1989, 1990, 1991, 1992, 1993, 1994, 1995, 1996, 1997, 1998, 1999, 2000, 2001, 2002, 2003, 2004, 2005, 2006, 2007, 2008, 2009, 2010, 2011, 2012, 2013, 2014, 2015, 2016, 2017, 2018, 2019, 2021
- Women's tennis (37): 1982, 1983, 1984, 1985, 1986, 1987, 1988, 1989, 1990, 1991, 1992, 1993, 1994, 1995, 1996, 1997, 1998, 1999, 2000, 2001, 2002, 2003, 2004, 2005, 2006, 2007, 2008, 2009, 2010, 2011, 2012, 2013, 2014, 2015, 2016, 2017, 2018, 2019, 2021
- Men's indoor track and field (29): 1978, 1988, 1989, 1990, 1991, 1993, 1994, 1995, 1996, 1997, 1998, 1999, 2000, 2001, 2003, 2004, 2005, 2006, 2008, 2009, 2010, 2011, 2012, 2013, 2014, 2015, 2016, 2017, 2019
- Women's indoor track and field (27): 1990, 1991, 1992, 1993, 1994, 1995, 1996, 1997, 1998, 1999, 2000, 2001, 2002, 2003, 2004, 2005, 2006, 2007, 2008, 2009, 2010, 2012, 2013, 2014, 2015, 2018, 2019
- Men's outdoor track and field (76): 1934, 1935, 1937, 1938, 1939, 1940, 1941, 1942, 1946, 1947, 1948, 1949, 1950, 1951, 1952, 1953, 1955, 1956, 1960, 1961, 1962, 1963, 1964, 1965, 1966, 1967, 1968, 1969, 1970, 1971, 1972, 1973, 1974, 1975, 1976, 1977, 1978, 1979, 1980, 1981, 1982, 1983, 1984, 1985, 1986, 1987, 1988, 1989, 1990, 1991, 1992, 1993, 1994, 1995, 1996, 1997, 1998, 1999, 2000, 2001, 2002, 2003, 2004, 2005, 2006, 2007, 2008, 2010, 2011, 2012, 2013, 2014, 2016, 2017, 2018, 2019
- Women's outdoor track and field (35): 1982, 1983, 1984, 1985, 1986, 1987, 1988, 1989, 1990, 1991, 1992, 1993, 1994, 1995, 1996, 1997, 1998, 1999, 2000, 2001, 2002, 2003, 2004, 2005, 2006, 2007, 2008, 2009, 2010, 2011, 2012, 2013, 2014, 2018, 2019
- Men's volleyball (29): 1970, 1971, 1972, 1974, 1975, 1976, 1978, 1979, 1980, 1981, 1982, 1983, 1984, 1987, 1989, 1993, 1994, 1995, 1996, 1997, 1998, 2000, 2001, 2005, 2006, 2016, 2018, 2022, 2023
- Women's volleyball (36): 1981, 1982, 1983, 1984, 1985, 1986, 1987, 1988, 1989, 1990, 1991, 1992, 1993, 1994, 1995, 1997, 1998, 1999, 2000, 2001, 2002, 2003, 2004, 2005, 2006, 2007, 2008, 2009, 2010, 2011, 2012, 2014, 2015, 2016, 2017, 2019
- Men's water polo (35): 1969, 1970, 1971, 1972, 1973, 1974, 1975, 1976, 1979, 1981, 1982, 1983, 1984, 1985, 1986, 1987, 1988, 1990, 1991, 1994, 1995, 1996, 1999, 2000, 2001, 2004, 2009, 2011, 2012, 2014, 2015, 2016, 2017, 2018, 2020, 2024
- Women's water polo (17): 2001, 2002, 2003, 2005, 2006, 2007, 2008, 2009, 2010, 2011, 2012, 2013, 2014, 2015, 2016, 2017, 2018, 2019, 2023

Results

School year	Sport	Opponent	Score
1949–50	Men's tennis	California; USC	11–5
1951–52	Men's tennis	California; USC	11–5
1952–53	Men's tennis	California	11–6
1953–54	Men's tennis	USC	15–10
1954–55	Football†	USC	34-0
1955–56	Men's outdoor track and field	Kansas	55.7–51
1955–56	Men's tennis	USC	15–14
1959–60	Men's tennis	USC	18–8
1960–61	Men's tennis	USC	17–16
1963–64	Men's basketball	Duke	98–83
1964–65	Men's basketball	Michigan	91–80
1964–65	Men's tennis	Miami (FL)	31–13
1965–66	Men's outdoor track and field	BYU	81–33
1966–67	Men's basketball	Dayton	79–64
1967–68	Men's basketball	North Carolina	78–55
1968–69	Men's basketball	Purdue	92–72
1969–70	Men's basketball	Jacksonville	80–69
1969–70	Men's tennis	Trinity (TX); Rice	26–22
1969–70	Men's volleyball	Long Beach State	3–0
1969–70	Men's water polo	California	5–2
1970–71	Men's basketball	Villanova	68–62
1970–71	Men's outdoor track and field	USC	52–41
1970–71	Men's tennis	Trinity (TX)	35–27
1970–71	Men's volleyball	UC Santa Barbara	3–0
1971–72	Men's basketball	Florida State	81–76
1971–72	Men's outdoor track and field	USC	82–49
1971–72	Men's volleyball	San Diego State	3–2
1971–72	Men's water polo	San Jose State	5–3
1972–73	Men's outdoor track and field	Oregon	52–31
1972–73	Men's water polo	UC Irvine	10–5
1973–74	Men's basketball	Memphis	87–66
1973–74	Men's volleyball	UC Santa Barbara	3–2
1974–75	Men's tennis	Miami (FL)	27–20
1974–75	Men's volleyball	UC Santa Barbara	3–1
1975–76	Men's basketball	Kentucky	92–85
1975–76	Men's tennis	USC	21–21
1975–76	Men's volleyball	Pepperdine	3–0
1977–78	Men's outdoor track and field	UTEP	50–50
1978–79	Men's tennis	Trinity (TX)	5–3
1978–79	Men's volleyball	USC	3–1
1980–81	Men's volleyball	USC	3–2
1981–82	Women's outdoor track and field	Tennessee	153–126
1981–82	Softball	Fresno State	2–0
1981–82	Men's swimming and diving	Texas	219–210
1981–82	Men's tennis	Pepperdine	5–1
1981–82	Men's volleyball	Penn State	3–0
1982–83	Women's outdoor track and field	Florida State	116.5–108
1982–83	Men's volleyball	Pepperdine	3–0
1983–84	Men's gymnastics	Penn State	287.3–281.25
1983–84	Softball	Texas A&M	1–0
1983–84	Men's tennis	Stanford	5–4
1983–84	Men's volleyball	Pepperdine	3–1
1984–85	Softball	Nebraska	2–1
1984–85	Women's volleyball	Stanford	3–2
1985–86	Men's soccer	American	1–0
1986–87	Men's gymnastics	Nebraska	285.3–284.75
1986–87	Men's outdoor track and field	Texas	81–28
1986–87	Men's volleyball	USC	3–0
1987–88	Men's golf	UTEP; Oklahoma; Oklahoma State	1,176–1,179
1987–88	Men's outdoor track and field	Texas	82–41
1987–88	Softball	Fresno State	3–0
1988–89	Softball	Fresno State	1–0
1988–89	Men's volleyball	Stanford	3–1
1989–90	Softball	Fresno State	2–0
1990–91	Women's golf	San Jose State	1,197–1,197
1990–91	Men's soccer	Rutgers	0–0
1990–91	Women's volleyball	Pacific	3–0
1991–92	Softball	Arizona	2–0
1991–92	Women's volleyball	Long Beach State	3–2
1992–93	Men's volleyball	CSU Northridge	3–0
1994–95	Men's basketball	Arkansas	89–78
1994–95	Softball	Vacated	--
1994–95	Men's volleyball	Penn State	3–0
1995–96	Men's volleyball	Hawai'i	3–2
1995–96	Men's water polo	California	10–8
1996–97	Women's gymnastics	Arizona State	197.15–196.85
1996–97	Men's water polo	USC	8–7
1997–98	Men's soccer	Virginia	2–0
1997–98	Men's volleyball	Pepperdine	3–0
1998–99	Softball	Washington	3–2
1999–00	Women's gymnastics	Utah	197.3–196.875
1999–00	Women's indoor track and field	South Carolina	51–41
1999–00	Men's volleyball	Ohio State	3–0
1999–00	Men's water polo	Stanford	6–5
2000–01	Women's gymnastics	Georgia	197.575–197.4
2000–01	Women's indoor track and field	South Carolina	53.5–40
2000–01	Men's water polo	UC San Diego	11–2
2000–01	Women's water polo	Stanford	5–4
2002–03	Women's gymnastics	Alabama	197.825–197.275
2002–03	Men's soccer	Stanford	1–0
2002–03	Softball	California	1–0
2002–03	Women's water polo	Stanford	4–3
2003–04	Women's golf	Oklahoma State	1,148–1,151
2003–04	Women's gymnastics	Georgia	198.125–197.2
2003–04	Women's outdoor track and field	LSU	69–68
2003–04	Softball	California	3–1
2004–05	Men's tennis	Baylor	4–3
2004–05	Men's water polo	Stanford	10–9
2004–05	Women's water polo	Stanford	3–2
2005–06	Men's volleyball	Penn State	3–0
2005–06	Women's water polo	USC	9–8
2006–07	Women's water polo	Stanford	5–4
2007–08	Men's golf	Stanford	1,194–1,195
2007–08	Women's tennis	California	4–0
2007–08	Women's water polo	USC	6–3
2008–09	Women's water polo	USC	5–4
2009–10	Women's gymnastics	Oklahoma	197.725–197.25
2009–10	Softball	Arizona	15–9
2010–11	Women's golf	Purdue	1,173–1,177
2011–12	Women's volleyball	Illinois	3–1
2012–13	Baseball	Mississippi State	8–0
2013–14	Women's soccer	Florida State	1–0
2013–14	Women's tennis	North Carolina	4–3
2014–15	Men's water polo	USC	9–8
2015–16	Men's water polo	USC	10–7
2017–18	Beach volleyball	Florida State	3–1
2017–18	Women's gymnastics	Oklahoma	198.075–198.0375
2017–18	Men's water polo	USC	7–5
2018–19	Beach volleyball	USC	3–0
2018–19	Softball	Oklahoma	5–4
2020–21	Men's water polo	USC	7–6
2022–23	Women's soccer	UNC	3–2 in 2OT
2022–23	Men's volleyball	Hawaii	3–1

† The football championship is not an official NCAA championship.

Below are ten pre-NCAA national championships that were won by UCLA as a member of the AIAW from 1974 to 1981 and its predecessor, the DGWS, in 1971:

- Women's badminton (1): 1977 (AIAW)
- Women's basketball (1): 1978 (AIAW)
- Women's golf (1): 1971 (AIAW)
- Softball (1): 1978 (AIAW)
- Women's tennis (1): 1981 (AIAW)
- Women's outdoor track and field (2): 1975, 1977 (AIAW)
- Women's volleyball (3): 1971, 1974, 1975 (AIAW)

Below are twenty-four national club team championships:

- Co-ed archery (1): 2015 (USA Archery)
- Men's archery (1): 2015 (USA Archery)
- Women's archery (4): 1930, 1931, 1932, 2015 (USA Archery)
- Men's badminton (3): 1977, 1981, 1982 (ABA)
- Women's badminton (1): 1977 (ABA)
- Co-ed sailing (1): 1978 (ICSA)
- Men's team handball: 1979 (United States Team Handball Federation, highest adult division in 1979)
- Co-ed tennis (1): 2011 (USTA)
- Men's tennis (7): 1984, 1991, 1993, 1996, 1997, 1999, 2001 (ITA)
- Women's tennis (1): 2012 (ITA)
- Women's triathlon (3): 2014, 2015, 2016 (USA Triathlon)

=== Individual ===
UCLA had 273 Bruins win NCAA individual championships at the Division I level.

NCAA individual championships
Order	School year	Athlete(s)	Sport	Source
1	1932–33	Jack Tidball	Men's tennis	
2	1934–35	Jimmy LuValle	Men's outdoor track and field	
3	1937–38	Bill Lacefield	Men's outdoor track and field	
4	1939–40	Jackie Robinson	Men's outdoor track and field	
5	1946–47	Ray Maggard	Men's outdoor track and field	
6	1948–49	Craig Dixon	Men's outdoor track and field	
7	1948–49	Craig Dixon	Men's outdoor track and field	
8	1949–50	Herbert Flam; Gene Garrett	Men's tennis	
9	1949–50	Herbert Flam	Men's tennis	
10	1950–51	George Brown	Men's outdoor track and field	
11	1951–52	George Brown	Men's outdoor track and field	
12	1952–53	Bob Perry; Lawrence Huebner	Men's tennis	
13	1952–53	Don Perry	Men's gymnastics	
14	1953–54	Bob Perry; Ronald Livingston	Men's tennis	
15	1953–54	Don Perry	Men's gymnastics	
16	1954–55	Don Faber	Men's gymnastics	
17	1954–55	Robert Hammond	Men's gymnastics	
18	1955–56	Ron Drummond	Men's outdoor track and field	
19	1955–56	Nick Dyer	Men's outdoor track and field	
20	1959–60	Larry Nagler; Allen Fox	Men's tennis	
21	1959–60	Jim Johnson	Men's outdoor track and field	
22	1959–60	Larry Nagler	Men's tennis	
23	1960–61	Allen Fox	Men's tennis	
24	1961–62	Kermit Alexander	Men's outdoor track and field	
25	1964–65	Ian Crookenden; Arthur Ashe	Men's tennis	
26	1964–65	Arthur Ashe	Men's tennis	
27	1964–65	Bob Day	Men's outdoor track and field	
28	1965–66	Tom Jones; Bob Frey; Ron Copeland; Norm Jackson	Men's outdoor track and field	
29	1965–66	Gene Gall; Don Domansky; Ron Copeland; Bob Frey	Men's outdoor track and field	
30	1965–66	Ian Crookenden; Charlie Pasarell	Men's tennis	
31	1965–66	Ron Copeland	Men's outdoor track and field	
32	1965–66	Tom Jones	Men's outdoor track and field	
33	1965–66	Charlie Pasarell	Men's tennis	
34	1966–67	Mike Berger; Russell Webb; Stanley Cole; Zac Zom	Men's swimming and diving	
35	1966–67	Mike Burton	Men's swimming and diving	
36	1966–67	Zac Zom	Men's swimming and diving	
37	1967–68	Mike Burton	Men's swimming and diving	
38	1967–68	Steve Marcus	Men's outdoor track and field	
39	1967–68	Jon Vaughan	Men's outdoor track and field	
40	1967–68	Zac Zom	Men's swimming and diving	
41	1967–68	Zac Zom	Men's swimming and diving	
42	1968–69	Frey Heath	Men's swimming and diving	
43	1968–69	John Smith; Len Von Hofwegen; Andy Young; Wayne Collett	Men's outdoor track and field	
44	1969–70	Bob Langston; John Smith; Brad Lyman; Wayne Collett	Men's outdoor track and field	
45	1969–70	Jeff Borowiak	Men's tennis	
46	1969–70	Mike Burton	Men's swimming and diving	
47	1969–70	Mike Burton	Men's swimming and diving	
48	1969–70	Mike Burton	Men's swimming and diving	
49	1970–71	Warren Edmonson; Reggie Echols; John Smith; Wayne Collett	Men's outdoor track and field	
50	1970–71	Haroon Rahim; Jeff Borowiak	Men's tennis	
51	1970–71	Jimmy Connors	Men's tennis	
52	1970–71	John Smith	Men's outdoor track and field	
53	1971–72	Reggie Echols; Ron Gaddis; Benny Brown; John Smith	Men's outdoor track and field	
54	1971–72	Tom Bruce	Men's swimming and diving	
55	1971–72	James Butts	Men's outdoor track and field	
56	1971–72	Warren Edmonson	Men's outdoor track and field	
57	1971–72	John Smith	Men's outdoor track and field	
58	1972–73	Ron Gaddis; Gordon Peppars; Maxie Parks; Benny Brown	Men's outdoor track and field	
59	1972–73	Finn Bendixen	Men's outdoor track and field	
60	1972–73	Milan Tiff	Men's outdoor track and field	
61	1973–74	Lynnsey Guerrero; Benny Brown; Jerome Walters; Maxie Parks	Men's outdoor track and field	
62	1973–74	Jerry Herndon	Men's outdoor track and field	
63	1974–75	Benny Brown	Men's outdoor track and field	
64	1974–75	Billy Martin	Men's tennis	
65	1974–75	George McDonnell	Men's swimming and diving	
66	1975–76	Peter Fleming (tennis); Ferdi Taygan	Men's tennis	
67	1976–77	John Hart	Men's gymnastics	
68	1976–77	James Owens	Men's outdoor track and field	
69	1977–78	John Austin; Bruce Nichols	Men's tennis	
70	1977–78	Greg Foster	Men's outdoor track and field	
71	1977–78	Brian Goodell	Men's swimming and diving	
72	1977–78	Brian Goodell	Men's swimming and diving	
73	1977–78	Brian Goodell	Men's swimming and diving	
74	1977–78	Dave Laut	Men's outdoor track and field	
75	1977–78	Mike Tully	Men's indoor track and field	
76	1977–78	Mike Tully	Men's outdoor track and field	
77	1978–79	Fred Bohna	Wrestling	
78	1978–79	Greg Foster	Men's outdoor track and field	
79	1978–79	Brian Goodell	Men's swimming and diving	
80	1978–79	Brian Goodell	Men's swimming and diving	
81	1978–79	Brian Goodell	Men's swimming and diving	
82	1978–79	Dave Laut	Men's outdoor track and field	
83	1979–80	Mark Anderson	Men's outdoor track and field	
84	1979–80	William Barrett	Men's swimming and diving	
85	1979–80	William Barrett	Men's swimming and diving	
86	1979–80	Greg Foster	Men's outdoor track and field	
87	1979–80	Brian Goodell	Men's swimming and diving	
88	1979–80	Brian Goodell	Men's swimming and diving	
89	1979–80	Brian Goodell	Men's swimming and diving	
90	1980–81	William Barrett	Men's swimming and diving	
91	1980–81	Rafael Escalas	Men's swimming and diving	
92	1980–81	Andre Phillips	Men's outdoor track and field	
93	1980–81	Peter Vidmar	Men's gymnastics	
94	1980–81	Peter Vidmar	Men's gymnastics	
95	1981–82	William Barrett; Christopher Silva; Stuart MacDonald; Robin Leamy	Men's swimming and diving	
96	1981–82	Heather Ludloff; Lynn Lewis	Women's tennis	
97	1981–82	William Barrett	Men's swimming and diving	
98	1981–82	Florence Griffith	Women's outdoor track and field	
99	1981–82	Jackie Joyner	Women's outdoor track and field	
100	1981–82	Robin Leamy	Men's swimming and diving	
101	1981–82	Robin Leamy	Men's swimming and diving	
102	1981–82	Peter Vidmar	Men's gymnastics	
103	1981–82	Peter Vidmar	Men's gymnastics	
104	1981–82	Peter Vidmar	Men's gymnastics	
105	1982–83	Michelle Bush	Women's outdoor track and field	
106	1982–83	Mitch Gaylord	Men's gymnastics	
107	1982–83	Florence Griffith	Women's outdoor track and field	
108	1982–83	Tom Jager	Men's swimming and diving	
109	1982–83	Jackie Joyner	Women's outdoor track and field	
110	1982–83	Alex Schwartz	Men's gymnastics	
111	1983–84	Christopher Silva; Franz Mortensen; Lawrence Hayes; Tom Jager	Men's swimming and diving	
112	1983–84	Tonya Alston	Women's outdoor track and field	
113	1983–84	John Brenner	Men's outdoor track and field	
114	1983–84	John Brenner	Men's outdoor track and field	
115	1983–84	Tim Daggett	Men's gymnastics	
116	1983–84	Tim Daggett	Men's gymnastics	
117	1983–84	Tim Daggett	Men's gymnastics	
118	1983–84	Tom Jager	Men's swimming and diving	
119	1983–84	Tom Jager	Men's swimming and diving	
120	1984–85	Tom Jager	Men's swimming and diving	
121	1984–85	Tony Pineda	Men's gymnastics	
122	1985–86	Brian Ginsberg	Men's gymnastics	
123	1985–86	Tom Jager	Men's swimming and diving	
124	1985–86	Giovanni Minervini	Men's swimming and diving	
125	1985–86	Curtis Holdsworth	Men's gymnastics	
126	1985–86	Toni Lutjens	Women's outdoor track and field	
127	1985–86	Doug Shaffer	Men's swimming and diving	
128	1986–87	Anthony Washington; Kevin Young; Henry Thomas; Danny Everett	Men's outdoor track and field	
129	1986–87	Kim Hamilton	Women's gymnastics	
130	1986–87	Jim Connolly	Men's outdoor track and field	
131	1986–87	David Moriel	Men's gymnastics	
132	1986–87	Kevin Young	Men's outdoor track and field	
133	1987–88	Steve Lewis; Kevin Young; Danny Everett; Henry Thomas	Men's outdoor track and field	
134	1987–88	Monica Phillips; Gail Devers; Chewaukii Knigthen; Janeene Vickers	Women's outdoor track and field	
135	1987–88	Patrick Galbraith; Brian Garrow	Men's tennis	
136	1987–88	Allyson Cooper; Stella Sampras	Women's tennis	
137	1987–88	Jill Andrews	Women's gymnastics	
138	1987–88	Gail Devers	Women's outdoor track and field	
139	1987–88	Danny Everett	Men's outdoor track and field	
140	1987–88	Kim Hamilton	Women's gymnastics	
141	1987–88	Giovanni Minervini	Men's swimming and diving	
142	1987–88	Kevin Young	Men's outdoor track and field	
143	1988–89	Jill Andrews	Women's gymnastics	
144	1988–89	Kim Hamilton	Women's gymnastics	
145	1988–89	Kim Hamilton	Women's gymnastics	
146	1988–89	Janeene Vickers	Women's outdoor track and field	
147	1988–89	Chris Waller	Men's gymnastics	
148	1989–90	Brad Hayashi	Men's gymnastics	
149	1989–90	Steve Lewis	Men's outdoor track and field	
150	1989–90	Tracie Millett	Women's indoor track and field	
151	1989–90	Tracie Millett	Women's outdoor track and field	
152	1989–90	Tracie Millett	Women's outdoor track and field	
153	1989–90	Janeene Vickers	Women's outdoor track and field	
154	1989–90	Chris Waller	Men's gymnastics	
155	1990–91	Eric Bergreen	Men's indoor track and field	
156	1990–91	Andrea Cecchi	Men's swimming and diving	
157	1990–91	Brad Hayashi	Men's gymnastics	
158	1990–91	Scott Keswick	Men's gymnastics	
159	1990–91	Tracie Millett	Women's indoor track and field	
160	1990–91	Janeene Vickers	Women's outdoor track and field	
161	1991–92	Mamie Ceniza; Iwalani McCalla	Women's tennis	
162	1991–92	Andrea Cecchi	Men's swimming and diving	
163	1991–92	Andrea Cecchi	Men's swimming and diving	
164	1991–92	Dawn Dumble	Women's indoor track and field	
165	1991–92	Scott Keswick	Men's gymnastics	
166	1992–93	Dawn Dumble	Women's outdoor track and field	
167	1992–93	Steve McCain	Men's gymnastics	
168	1992–93	Erik Smith	Men's outdoor track and field	
169	1993–94	Amy Acuff	Women's indoor track and field	
170	1993–94	Jim Foody	Men's gymnastics	
171	1993–94	John Godina	Men's indoor track and field	
172	1993–94	John Godina	Men's outdoor track and field	
173	1993–94	Karen Hecox	Women's outdoor track and field	
174	1993–94	Steve McCain	Men's gymnastics	
175	1994–95	Amy Acuff	Women's indoor track and field	
176	1994–95	Keri Phebus; Susie Starrett	Women's tennis	
177	1994–95	Amy Acuff	Women's outdoor track and field	
178	1994–95	Valeyta Althouse	Women's outdoor track and field	
179	1994–95	Ato Boldon	Men's outdoor track and field	
180	1994–95	Dawn Dumble	Women's indoor track and field	
181	1994–95	Dawn Dumble	Women's outdoor track and field	
182	1994–95	John Godina	Men's indoor track and field	
183	1994–95	John Godina	Men's outdoor track and field	
184	1994–95	John Godina	Men's outdoor track and field	
185	1994–95	Greg Johnson	Men's outdoor track and field	
186	1994–95	Keri Phebus	Women's tennis	
187	1994–95	Stella Umeh	Women's gymnastics	
188	1995–96	Justin Gimelstob; Srđan Muškatirović	Men's tennis	
189	1995–96	Amy Acuff	Women's outdoor track and field	
190	1995–96	Valeyta Althouse	Women's indoor track and field	
191	1995–96	Ato Boldon	Men's outdoor track and field	
192	1995–96	Jonathan Ogden	Men's indoor track and field	
193	1995–96	Annette Salmeen	Women's swimming and diving	
194	1996–97	Amy Acuff	Women's indoor track and field	
195	1996–97	Meb Keflezighi	Men's indoor track and field	
196	1996–97	Meb Keflezighi	Men's outdoor track and field	
197	1996–97	Meb Keflezighi	Men's outdoor track and field	
198	1996–97	Seilala Sua	Women's outdoor track and field	
199	1997–98	Meb Keflezighi	Men's cross country	
200	1997–98	Heidi Moneymaker	Women's gymnastics	
201	1997–98	Stella Umeh	Women's gymnastics	
202	1997–98	Seiala Sua	Women's outdoor track and field	
203	1998–99	Jess Strutzel; Brian Fell; Michael Granville; Mark Hauser	Men's indoor track and field	
204	1998–99	Michael Granville; Malachi Davis; Terrence Williams; Brian Fell	Men's outdoor track and field	
205	1998–99	Kiralee Hayashi	Women's gymnastics	
206	1998–99	Joanna Hayes	Women's outdoor track and field	
207	1998–99	Heidi Moneymaker	Women's gymnastics	
208	1998–99	Seilala Sua	Women's outdoor track and field	
209	1998–99	Seilala Sua	Women's outdoor track and field	
210	1999–00	Mohini Bhardwaj	Women's gymnastics	
211	1999–00	Lena Degteva	Women's gymnastics	
212	1999–00	Tracy O'Hara	Women's indoor track and field	
213	1999–00	Tracy O'Hara	Women's outdoor track and field	
214	1999–00	Keyon Soley	Women's indoor track and field	
215	1999–00	Jess Strutzel	Men's indoor track and field	
216	1999–00	Seilala Sua	Women's indoor track and field	
217	1999–00	Seilala Sua	Women's outdoor track and field	
218	1999–00	Seilala Sua	Women's outdoor track and field	
219	2000–01	Mohini Bhardwaj	Women's gymnastics	
220	2000–01	Christina Tolson	Women's indoor track and field	
221	2000–01	Christina Tolson	Women's outdoor track and field	
222	2000–01	Yvonne Tousek	Women's gymnastics	–
223	2000–01	Onnie Willis	Women's gymnastics	
224	2001–02	Tiffany Burgess; Monique Henderson; Jessica Marr; Lena Nilsson	Women's indoor track and field	
225	2001–02	Jessica Cosby	Women's outdoor track and field	
226	2001–02	Jamie Dantzscher	Women's gymnastics	
227	2001–02	Jamie Dantzscher	Women's gymnastics	
228	2001–02	Jamie Dantzscher	Women's gymnastics	
229	2001–02	Darnesha Griffith	Women's indoor track and field	
230	2001–02	Darnesha Griffith	Women's outdoor track and field	
231	2001–02	Lena Nilsson	Women's outdoor track and field	
232	2001–02	Tracy O'Hara	Women's outdoor track and field	
233	2001–02	Chaniqua Ross	Women's outdoor track and field	
234	2002–03	Jamie Dantzscher	Women's gymnastics	
235	2002–03	Lena Nilsson	Women's indoor track and field	
236	2002–03	Kate Richardson	Women's gymnastics	
237	2002–03	Kate Richardson	Women's gymnastics	
238	2002–03	Sheena Tosta	Women's outdoor track and field	
239	2003–04	Daniela Berček; Lauren Fisher	Women's tennis	
240	2003–04	Chelsea Johnson	Women's outdoor track and field	
241	2003–04	Sheena Tosta	Women's outdoor track and field	
242	2004–05	Candice Baucham	Women's outdoor track and field	
243	2004–05	Monique Henderson	Women's outdoor track and field	
244	2004–05	Kristen Maloney	Women's gymnastics	
245	2004–05	Kristen Maloney	Women's gymnastics	
246	2004–05	Tasha Schwikert	Women's gymnastics	
247	2005–06	Chelsea Johnson	Women's indoor track and field	
248	2005–06	Benjamin Kohllöffel	Men's tennis	
249	2005–06	Kate Richardson	Women's gymnastics	
250	2006–07	Nicole Leach	Women's outdoor track and field	
251	2006–07	Rhonda Watkins	Women's indoor track and field	
252	2006–07	Rhonda Watkins	Women's outdoor track and field	
253	2007–08	Tracy Lin; Riza Zalameda	Women's tennis	
254	2007–08	Kevin Chappell	Men's golf	
255	2007–08	Tasha Schwikert	Women's gymnastics	
256	2007–08	Tasha Schwikert	Women's gymnastics	
257	2008–09	Nicole Leach	Women's outdoor track and field	
258	2009–10	Brittani McCullough	Women's gymnastics	
259	2009–10	Vanessa Zamarripa	Women's gymnastics	
260	2010–11	Samantha Peszek	Women's gymnastics	
261	2012–13	Julian Wruck	Men's outdoor track and field	
262	2013–14	Marcos Giron	Men's tennis	
263	2014–15	Samantha Peszek	Women's gymnastics	
264	2014–15	Samantha Peszek	Women's gymnastics	
265	2015–16	Mackenzie McDonald; Martin Redlicki	Men's tennis	
266	2015–16	Danusia Francis	Women's gymnastics	
267	2015–16	Mackenzie McDonald	Men's tennis	
268	2016–17	Kyla Ross	Women's gymnastics	
269	2016–17	Kyla Ross	Women's gymnastics	
270	2017–18	Martin Redlicki; Evan Zhu	Men's tennis	
271	2017–18	Christine Lee	Women's gymnastics	
272	2017–18	Christine Lee	Women's gymnastics	
273	2017–18	Katelyn Ohashi	Women's gymnastics	
274	2018–19	Kyla Ross	Women's gymnastics	
275	2018–19	Kyla Ross	Women's gymnastics	
276	2018–19	Maxime Cressy; Keegan Smith	Men's tennis	
277	2018–19	Gabby Andrews; Ayan Broomfield	Women's tennis	
278	2022–23	Fangran Tian	Women's tennis	

== Notable non-varsity sports ==
=== Badminton ===
The UCLA varsity men's badminton team won three national championships in 1977, 1981 and 1982. The 1977 squad was led by Chris Kinard, multiple winner of the U.S. Men's Singles Championship before and during his career at UCLA. Kinard is a member of the U.S. Badminton Hall of Fame.

The women's varsity badminton team also won the AIAW intercollegiate championship in 1977.

=== Boxing ===
The men's and women's boxing teams have competed as part of the National Collegiate Boxing Association since 2016, after switching from the United States Intercollegiate Boxing Association. The women's team has earned three individual national boxing titles: one from the USIBA in 2014, and two from the NCBA, in 2016 and 2019.

=== Ice Hockey ===
Before the school was even called 'UCLA', the ice hockey program was formed, joining several other local teams including USC and Occidental. The team continued for several years despite the great depression being in full force. In the late 1930s a new arena was built for the Los Angeles programs but World War II forced all of the pacific coast teams to shutter their programs in the early '40s. When teams were reconstituted afterwards, UCLA was not among the programs to resurface and the new arena, the Tropical Ice Gardens, was demolished in 1949.

UCLA eventually returned to the ice in 1961 but only as a club sport. Until recently, it played against many of its former varsity opponents in the Pac-8.

Currently, UCLA plays in the West Coast Hockey Conference in the Tier 1 division against rivals like Loyola Marymount, Long Beach State, Grand Canyon, Northern Arizona, Arizona State, and others. They've made back to back appearances at the ACHA Men's D2 Western Region playoffs. They are currently coached by former player Griffin McCarty, son of the Detroit Red Wings legend Darren McCarty and Sean Allen, a former Hamilton College men's hockey player.

Historically, UCLA and USC have faced off in an annual 5-game series dubbed "The Crosstown Cup". Up until the COVID-19 pandemic, one of the games took place at the Staples Center in downtown Los Angeles.

The Bruins currently play at The Cube Ice and Entertainment Center in Santa Clarita, California, which played host to the 2023 and 2024 WCHC Playoffs, both of which UCLA lost in the final of.

=== Rugby ===
Founded in 1934, UCLA rugby is one of the historically great college rugby teams. UCLA has won 2 national championships, and amassed a 362–46–2 record from 1966 to 1982, but the program lost its varsity status in 1982. The Bruins play Division 1 college rugby in the PAC Rugby Conference. The Bruins are led by head coach Scott Stewart, who formerly played international rugby for Canada. The team plays its home games at the Wallis Annenberg Stadium.

James Schaeffer introduced the original team in 1934, which was eventually revived post-WWII through Norm Padgett and his tireless hustling and fraternity walks. In 1958, Padgett's former Captain, Ged Gardner, assumed the Coaching role from until 1965. Gardner built membership, interest and skill to which Coach Dennis Storer added his own unique style. Dennis Storer remained Head Coach from 1966 - 1982, when the program operated as a Varsity Sport, winning a national title in 1972 and then another in 1975. Rugby was dropped as a varsity sport shortly after by the Athletics department. Storer subsequently resumed the role from 1987 to 1989 after the program was downgraded to Club Status. During his tenure, Storer guided the program to 2 Monterey National Championship Titles, numerous Southern California Titles, 2 national championship titles, and produced 14 US Eagles with himself being named the first ever USA Eagles Coach.

In the summer of 2003, a dedicated Alumni group headed by Coach Storer, launched an effort to return Bruin Rugby to its former prowess as the program had not reached the National Playoffs since the 1980s, was relegated to Club Status, and suffered from a lack of experienced and committed leadership. This initiative led to the hiring Head Coach Scott Stewart, a former Canadian International with 64 caps and 5 World Cup appearances. Since that time, the Bruins have progressed rapidly and have become a consistently top-ranked program in both XV's and 7's rugby and a regular contender to win a National Championship in both codes.

UCLA finished the 2010–11 season ranked 25th in the country. In the 2011–12 season UCLA placed second in the Pacific Conference, reached the quarterfinals of the 2012 men's national playoffs, and finished the season ranked 11th in the nation. During the 2012–13 season, UCLA finished second in the PAC conference, highlighted by a 50–38 win over 6th-ranked Utah, which propelled UCLA into a top-10 position in the national rankings. UCLA – along with fellow PAC schools Cal and Utah – was one of the original eight teams to form the Varsity Cup, which began play in 2013. UCLA reached the quarterfinals of the 2015 Varsity Cup, before losing to eventual champions BYU.

UCLA has also been successful in rugby sevens. UCLA reached the quarterfinals of the 2012 Las Vegas Invitational college rugby sevens tournament. UCLA defeated Arizona State to finish third at the 2012 PAC 7s tournament. UCLA defeated Dartmouth to reach the semifinals of the 2013 Collegiate Rugby Championship at PPL Park in Philadelphia in a tournament broadcast live on NBC. UCLA again reached the semifinals of the 2014 Collegiate Rugby Championship, before losing, 17–20, to eventual champions Cal. UCLA won the 2014 West Coast 7s with a 14–12 upset victory over Cal in the final. In 2016 the Bruins fell to rivals Cal and then in 2018 to Lindenwood in the final of the Collegiate Rugby Championship (7s).

Scott Stewart was replaced in 2020 by Dave Clancy. Clancy coached around the world with professional teams such as Munster Rugby, international teams such as Samoa, Cayman Islands and US Representative teams along with domestic experience building a club program with the Chicago Lions. Due to certain circumstances and the struggles of the pandemic, Dave left the program in 2021.

In 2022, Harry Bennett was announced as the new head coach of the UCLA Rugby team. Originally from Scone, New South Wales, Australia, Bennett had previously played as a flyhalf and fullback for various international teams and teams in the United States. He began his professional career with the Super Rugby team, the NSW Waratahs, straight out of high school, and later concluded his playing career with the New York Ironworkers of the MLR.

In 2019 UCLA rugby player, Benjamin Broselle was called up to the USA Eagles 7s team to play in the HSBC USA 7s tournament. In 2021, UCLA rugby produced another Eagle, Lucas Lacamp, who made his debut at the HSBC Dubai 7s while still a Junior at UCLA. Lacamp received honors as a Rudy Scholz Award Finalist and is likely to be a part of the squad that travels to compete at the 2024 Summer Olympics in Paris.

Currently, the Bruins compete in all of the Major National Domestic competitions including the PAC Rugby Conference (XV's & 7's), CRAA D1A, USAR Collegiate National Championships, and the Collegiate Rugby 7s Championships (7's).

== Athletics facilities ==
In 2014, UCLA named all of its recreation and athletics facilities in honor of Jackie Robinson, who was a four-sport student-athlete at the school and went on to play Major League Baseball as the first African American to do so in the league. The Jackie Robinson "42" Athletics and Recreation Complex monument was installed in front of the John Wooden Recreation Center and was unveiled on March 5, 2016. The school also retired number 42 which was the number Robinson worn as a member of the Brooklyn Dodgers.

Two notable sports facilities serve as home venues for UCLA sports. Since 1982, the Bruin football team has played home games at the Rose Bowl in Pasadena, California. From 1923 to 1981, including the Bruins' 1954 National Championship year, the team played at the Los Angeles Memorial Coliseum in Los Angeles. The men's and women's basketball, women's gymnastics and volleyball teams play at Pauley Pavilion on campus. The softball team plays on campus at Easton Stadium. Down the hill, the water polo teams, as well as the swim and dive teams, compete at Spieker Aquatics Center. For baseball, there is the Steele Field at Jackie Robinson Stadium, located close to campus.

See also: Bel-Air Country Club, Drake Stadium, Los Angeles Tennis Center, Sunset Canyon Recreation Center, UCLA Marina Aquatic Center, Wallis Annenberg Stadium

== Athletic alumni ==
Mark Harmon, Lynn "Buck" Compton, Jackie Robinson, Rafer Johnson, Walt Hazzard, Gail Goodrich, Troy Aikman, Gary Beban, Kenny Easley, Tom Fears, Billy Kilmer, Bob Waterfield, Jimmy Connors, Lonzo Ball, Kareem Abdul-Jabbar (Lew Alcindor), Jamaal Wilkes, Jackie Joyner-Kersee, Evelyn Ashford, Bill Walton, Kenny Washington, Arthur Ashe, Reggie Miller, Troy Glaus, Tim Daggett, Baron Davis, Stacey Nuveman, Lisa Fernandez, Amanda Freed, Kevin Love, Tairia Flowers, Donna de Varona, Russell Westbrook, Cobi Jones, Lauren Cheney, Sydney Leroux and Ann Meyers are just some of the notable athletic alumni, many of whom have achieved success in other fields.

Former coaches have included Red Sanders, Tommy Prothro, Dick Vermeil, Terry Donahue, Al Scates, Adam Krikorian, Jonathan Bornstein, Andy Banachowski, Jim Harrick, and John Wooden.

== Olympic competitors ==
In addition to the success of its collegiate sports program, UCLA has been represented at the Olympics. In the 2004 Athens games, UCLA sent 56 athletes, more than any other university in the country. At the 2008 Beijing Olympic Games, Bruins won 15 medals, including 4 gold, 9 silver, and 2 bronze. Additionally, five coaches came from UCLA: Jill Ellis (women's soccer, gold), Guy Baker (women's water polo, silver), Bob Alejo (men's beach volleyball, gold), Jeannette Boldon (women's track and field, multiple medals), and John Speraw (men's volleyball, gold).

	Gold	Silver	Bronze
Total Olympic Medals	126	65	60

== Symbolism ==
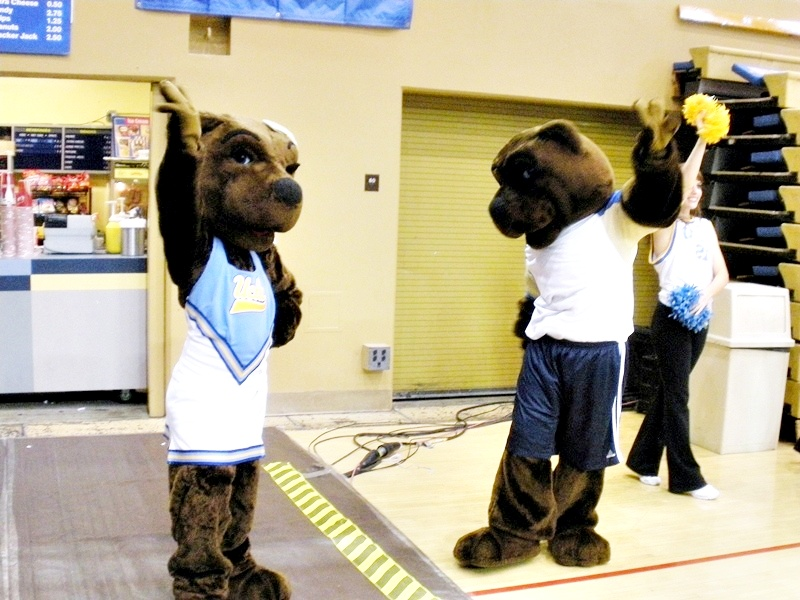
Joe and Josephine Bruin in Pauley Pavilion.

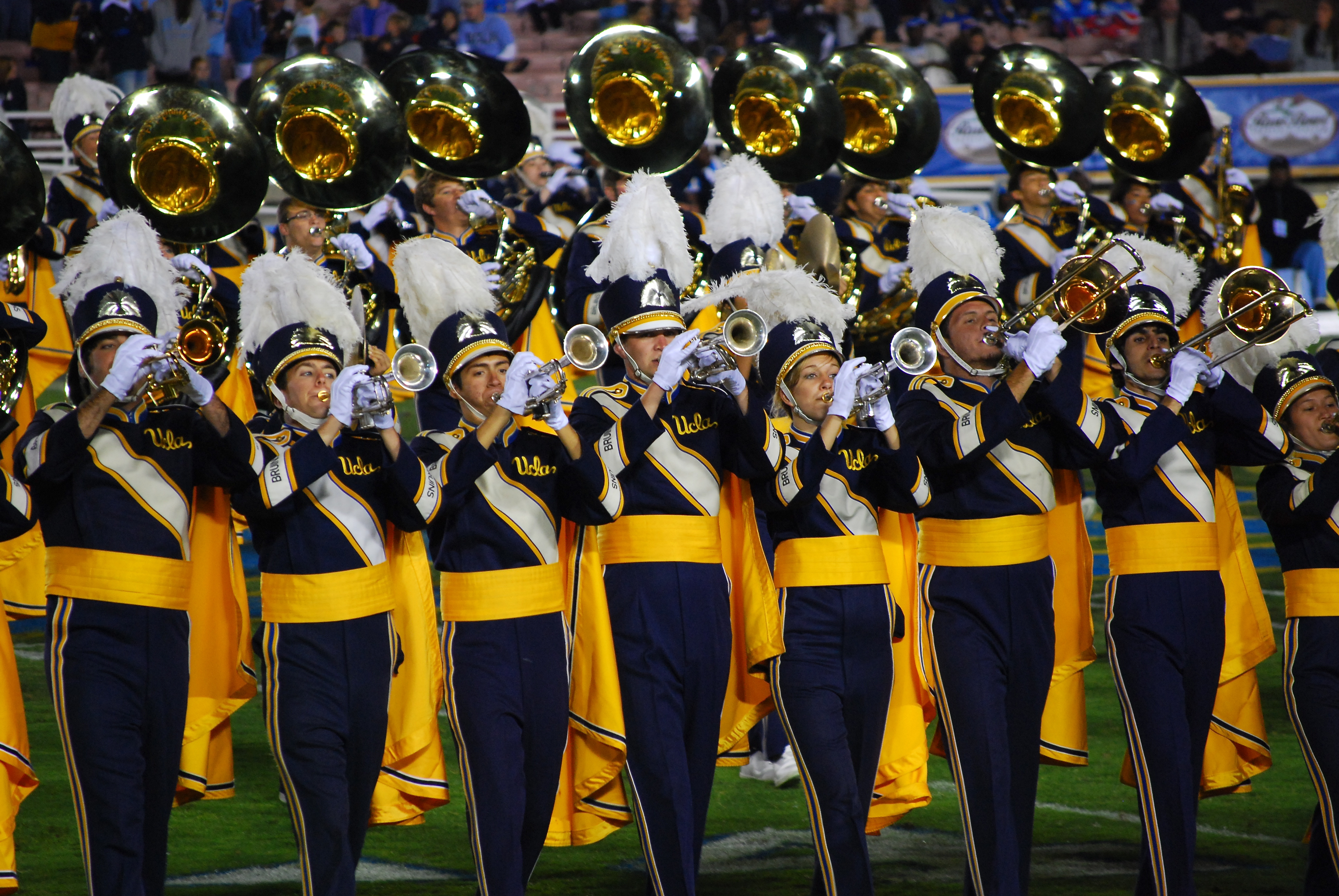
The Solid Gold Sound performs on the field at the Rose Bowl.

The statue of the UCLA Bruin, on Bruin Walk. The statue was designed by Billy Fitzgerald.

The Bruin mascots are Joe and Josephine Bruin. In addition to regular attendance at UCLA sporting events, the duo participates in other events for the university.

On September 30, 1984, the UCLA Alumni Association celebrated its 50th anniversary by installing "The Bruin" statue in Bruin Plaza. It was billed as the largest bear sculpture in the United States, at 10 feet long, 6 feet wide, 3 feet across and weighing more than 2 tons.

The Solid Gold Sound of the UCLA Bruin Marching Band entertains crowds at major athletic and extracurricular events. The school fight songs are "Sons of Westwood" and "The Mighty Bruins". The spirit squad includes the cheer squad, the dance team and the yell crew, in addition to the mascots. The UCLA alumni band is the official band of the gymnastics team at the school.

== Rivalries ==
UCLA shares a traditional sports rivalry with the nearby University of Southern California (USC). This rivalry is relatively unique in NCAA Division I sports because both schools are located within the same city, Los Angeles. The Lexus Gauntlet was the name given to a now defunct competition between UCLA and USC in the 18 varsity sports that both competed in head-to-head; in 2003, 2005, and 2007 UCLA won the Lexus Gauntlet Trophy, while the University of Southern California won the trophy in 2002, 2004, 2006, 2008, and 2009. Competitions with official sponsorship were held from 2001 until the licensing contract ended in 2009. The annual football game features both teams vying for the Victory Bell.

California and UCLA have met annually on the football field since 1939. Because UCLA was founded as the southern branch of the University of California, the series takes on the quality of a sibling rivalry. The series was dominated early by Cal, followed by dominance by UCLA in the 1950s until 80s, and has become more evenly matched recently.

UCLA had a basketball rivalry with Notre Dame, with games played every year from 1966 to 1995. After UCLA's victory on February 7, 2009, UCLA leads the all-time series, 28–19. The performance of UCLA and Arizona influenced the national opinion of the conference when they were both in the Pac-12.

== UCLA Athletics Hall of Fame ==
In conjunction with the opening of the J.D. Morgan Athletics Center in November 1983, UCLA established an athletics Hall of Fame with 25 charter members representing a cross-section of the school's athletic history. Each year, a minimum of one and a maximum of eight former UCLA athletes, coaches or administrators are added to the Hall of Fame. Upon its 23rd year of existence, The Hall of Fame was moved to a new location facing Westwood Plaza. The new Hall of Fame is now double in size after its renovation and expansion, which was completed in the Winter of 2000. The first floor in the east wing of the new J.D. Morgan Athletics Center features the 8,000-square-foot (740 m^{2}) Athletics Hall of Fame and serves as the main entrance to the Department of Intercollegiate Athletics.

1984 (25 charter members): Bill Ackerman, athletic director; Lew Alcindor (Kareem Abdul-Jabbar), basketball; Arthur Ashe, tennis; Gary Beban, football; Mike Burton, swimming; Paul Cameron, football; Chris Chambliss, baseball; Elvin 'Ducky' Drake, track coach and trainer; Gail Goodrich, basketball; Walt Hazzard (Mahdi Abdul-Rahman), basketball; Cecil Hollingsworth, football scout and gymnastics and wrestling coach; Rafer Johnson, track; Kirk Kilgour, volleyball; Billy Kilmer, football; Donn Moomaw, football; J.D. Morgan, athletic director and tennis coach; Jackie Robinson, football, baseball, basketball and track; Henry 'Red' Sanders, football coach; Al Sparlis, football; Bill Spaulding, football coach; Bill Walton, basketball; Kenny Washington, football; Bob Waterfield, football; Keith (Jamaal) Wilkes, basketball; and John Wooden, basketball coach.

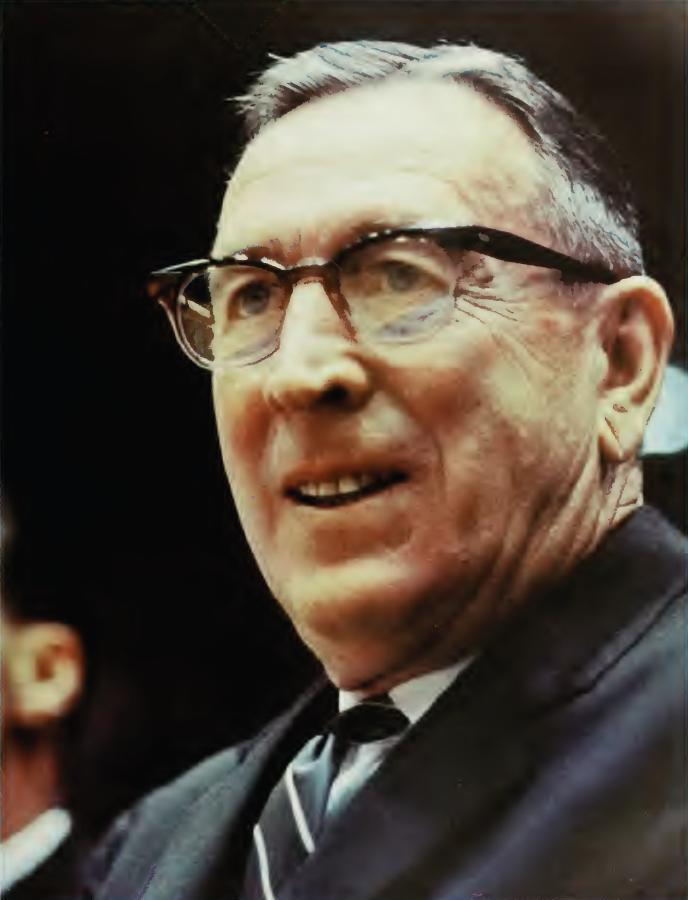
Coach Wooden circa 1972

1985 (6): Bob Davenport, football; Craig Dixon, track; Wilbur Johns, athletic director/basketball coach; Tommy Prothro, football coach; George Stanich, basketball; and Sidney Wicks, basketball.

1986 (8): Kermit Alexander, football; Burr Baldwin, football; Keith Erickson, basketball; Mike Frankovich, football; Jimmy LuValle, track; Willie Naulls, basketball; Jerry Norman, basketball player and assistant coach; and Don Paul, football.

1987 (8): Don Barksdale, basketball; George Dickerson, football; Jack Ellena, football; Bert LaBrucherie, football; Dick Linthicum, basketball; Jim Salsbury, football; John Smith, track; Jack Tidball, tennis.

1988 (6): Sam Balter, basketball; Mel Farr Sr., football; Robert Fischer, athletic director; Marques Johnson, basketball; Ann Meyers, basketball; and C.K. Yang, track.

1989 (7): Peter H. Dailey, football; Tom Fears, football; Vic Kelley, sports information director, Carl McBain, track; Karen Moe-Thornton, swimming; Ernie Suwara, volleyball; and Pat Turner, track.

1990 (7): Evelyn Ashford, track; Dr. Bobby Brown, baseball; Stan Cole, water polo; Denny Crum, basketball; Norm Duncan, football/administration; Mike Marienthal, football/special service; Mike Warren, basketball.

1991 (7): Willie Banks, track; Kenny Easley, football; Brian Goodell, swimming; Briggs Hunt, wrestling; Tim Leary, baseball; Jerry Robinson, football; Christopher "Sinjin" Smith, volleyball.

1992 (9): Wayne Collett, track; Terry Condon, volleyball; Jim Johnson, football; Robin Leamy, swimming; Freeman McNeil, football; Dave Meyers, basketball; Jack Myers, baseball; Corey Pavin, golf; Woody Strode, football.

1993 (8): Sue Enquist, softball; Greg Foster, track; Maurice (Mac) Goodstein, football; Charles "Karch" Kiraly, volleyball; Jose Lopez, soccer; Don Manning, football; Bill Putnam, basketball; Curtis Rowe, basketball.

1994 (7): Don Bragg, basketball; Denise Curry, basketball; John Richardson, football; Larry Rundle, volleyball; John Sciarra, football; Kiki Vandeweghe, basketball; Peter Vidmar, gymnastics.

1995 (8): Jimmy Connors, tennis; Debbie Doom, softball; Mitch Gaylord, gymnastics; Ricci Luyties, volleyball; Stephen Pate, golf; John Peterson, football/track; Jerry Shipkey, football; Mike Tully, track.

1996 (7): Bill Barrett, swimming; Jackie Joyner-Kersee, track; Liz Masakayan, volleyball; Eddie Merrins, golf coach; Dot Richardson, softball; Skip Rowland, football; Dick Wallen, football.

1997 (8): Jim Bush, track coach; Paul Caligiuri, soccer; Tim Daggett, gymnastics; David Greenwood, basketball; Frank Lubin, basketball; Doug Partie, volleyball; Cal Rossi, football/baseball; Charles Young, chancellor.

1998 (12): Glenn Bassett, tennis coach; Sheila Cornell, softball; Randy Cross, football; Gaston Green, football; Florence Griffith-Joyner, track; Tom Jager, swimming; Eric Karros, baseball; Reggie Miller, basketball; Ken Norton, Jr., football; Tom Ramsey, football; Art Reichle, baseball coach; Cy Young, track.

1999 (12): Troy Aikman, football; Sam Boghosian, football; Kay Cockerill, golf; Tracy Compton, softball; Denise Corlett, volleyball/basketball; Dave Dalby, football; Gail Devers, track; Bob Horn, water polo; Ernie Johnson, football; Torey Lovullo, baseball; Sharon Shapiro, gymnastics; Kevin Young, track.

2000 (10): Lucius Allen, basketball; Jeanne Beauprey-Reeves, volleyball; John Brenner, track and field; George Farmer, football; Kim Hamilton, gymnastics; Carnell Lake, football; Billie Moore, basketball; Steve Salmons, volleyball; Eddie Sheldrake, basketball; Dick Vermeil, football.

2001 (11): Jill Andrews, gymnastics; Sharron Backus, softball; Jim Brown, football; Charles Cheshire, football; Gary Cunningham, basketball; Terry Donahue, football; Warren Edmonson, track and field; John Green, basketball; John Lee, football; Lisa Longaker, softball; and Ozzie Volstad, volleyball.

2002 (9): Denny Cline, volleyball; Bob Day, track and field; Cobi Jones, soccer; Don MacLean, basketball; Shane Mack, baseball; Ted Narleski, football; Anita Ortega, basketball; Duffy Waldorf, golf; Russell Webb, water polo/swimming.

2003 (8): Danny Everett, track and field; Lisa Fernandez, softball; Brad Friedel, soccer; Ryan McGuire, baseball; Jerome "Pooh" Richardson, basketball; Don Rogers, football; Al Scates, volleyball; Tim Wrightman, football.

2004 (8): Henry Bibby, basketball; Dennis Dummit, football; Carlton Gray, football; Steve Lewis, track & field; James Owens, football/track & field; Sigi Schmid, soccer; Fred Slaughter, basketball; Natalie Williams, basketball/volleyball.

2005 (8): Hardiman Cureton, football; Dawn Dumble, track & field; Allen Fox, tennis; John Godina, track & field; Ed O'Bannon, basketball; Mike O'Hara, volleyball; Art Shurlock, gymnastics; Kenny Washington, basketball.

2006 (8): Carol Bower, rowing; Herb Flam, tennis; Monte Nitzkowski, swimming/water polo; Jonathan Ogden, football/track and field; Annette Salmeen, swimming; Dennis Storer, soccer/rugby; John Vallely, basketball; Elaine Youngs, volleyball.

2007 (8): Amy Acuff, track & field; George Brown, track & field; Jennifer Brundage, softball; Jim Ferguson, water polo; Troy Glaus, baseball; John Moore, basketball; Jeff Nygaard, volleyball; Keri Phebus, tennis

2008 (8): Traci Arkenberg, Soccer; Peter T. Dalis, Athletic Director/Administration; Kurt Krumpholz, Water Polo/Swimming; Leah Homma, Gymnastics; Robert Seaman, Track & Field; Jackie Tobian-Steinmann, Women's Golf Coach; Eric Turner, Football; Todd Zeile, Baseball

2009 (8): Tyus Edney, basketball; James "Cap" Haralson, football/track & field; Cade McNown, football; Stein Metzger, volleyball; Nicolle Payne, water polo; J.J. Stokes, football; Daiva Tomkus, volleyball; Walt Torrence, basketball

2010 (8): David Ashleigh, men's water polo; Andy Banachowski, women's volleyball coach; Judith Holland, administration; Mebrahtom Keflezighi, men's track & field; Valorie Kondos Field, women's gymnastics coach; Seilala Sua, women's track & field; Chase Utley, baseball; and Catherine Von Schwarz, women's water polo.

2011 (8): Gary Adams, baseball; Ato Boldon, track & field; Theotis Brown, football; Ernie Case, football; Larry Nagler, tennis; Mel North, fencing; Alex Rousseau, water polo; and Janeene Vickers-McKinney, track & field.

2012 (9): Ron Ballatore, men's swimming coach; Dr. Julie Bremner Romias, women's volleyball; Jack Hirsch, men's basketball; Fred McNeill, football; Stacey Nuveman, softball; Charles Pasarell, men's tennis; Coralie Simmons, women's water polo; Stella Umeh, gymnastics; and Dr. Gerald Finerman, team doctor

2013 (8): Mohini Bhardwaj, gymnastics; Carlos Bocanegra, men's soccer; Fred Bohna, wrestling; Eric Byrnes, baseball; Yvonne Gutierrez, softball; Don Johnson, men's basketball; Maylana Martin Douglas, women's basketball; Nandi Pryce, women's soccer

2014 (8): Guy Baker (water polo), James Butts (men's track & field), Joanna Hayes (women's track & field), Joe-Max Moore (men's soccer), Francis Wai (football, basketball, track & field, rugby), Natasha Watley (softball), and Onnie Willis (women's gymnastics)

2015 (8): Annett Buckner Davis (volleyball), Danny Farmer (football/volleyball), Billy Martin (men's tennis), Paul Nihipali (men's volleyball), Jan Palchikoff (women's rowing/swimming & diving), Janice Parks (softball), Eric Valent (baseball) and Richard Washington (men's basketball)

2016 (8): Julie Adams (softball), Jamie Dantzscher (women's gymnastics), Baron Davis (men's basketball), Natalie Golda (women's water polo), Chris Henderson (men's soccer), Adam Krikorian (water polo), Mike Marsh (track & field) and Wendell Tyler (football)

2017 (9): Toby Bailey (men's basketball), Robin Beauregard (women's water polo), Monique Henderson (track & field), Maurice Jones-Drew (football), Bob Larsen (track & field/cross country coach), Kristen Maloney (gymnastics), Brandon Taliaferro (men's volleyball), Gina Vecchione (softball), and Bobby Field (football, administration)

2018 (8): Nikki Blue (women's basketball), Kevin Chappell (men's golf), Lynn "Buck" Compton (baseball/football), Larry Farmer (men's basketball), Amanda Freed (softball), Jenny Johnson Jordan (women's volleyball), Eric Lindroth (men's water polo), and Stella Sampras Webster (women's tennis)

2019 (7): Jill Ellis (women's soccer), Peter Fleming (men's tennis), Tairia Flowers (softball), Skip Hicks (football), Courtney Mathewson (women's water polo), Adam Naeve (men's volleyball), Kristee Porter (women's volleyball, basketball, track & field)

2020 (9): Keira Goerl (softball), Lauren (Cheney) Holiday (women's soccer), Kevin Love (men's basketball), Mike Powell (track and field), Noelle Quinn (women's basketball), Dave Roberts (baseball), Tasha Schwikert (gymnastics), Russell Westbrook (men's basketball), Adam Wright (men's water polo)

2021 (8): Jeanette Bolden (track & field), Tiffany Joh (women's golf), Megan Langenfeld (softball), Marcedes Lewis (football), Tracy Murray (men's basketball), Keiko Price (women's swimming & diving), Kate Richardson (gymnastics)

2022 (9): Patrick Cantlay (men's golf), Gerrit Cole (baseball), DeShaun Foster (football), Dawn Harper-Nelson (track & field), Kelly Inouye-Perez (softball), Ole Mikkelsen (men's soccer), Linda Robertson Hanley (women's beach volleyball), Dave Saunders (men's volleyball), Ed Kezirian (extraordinary service)

2023 (8): B'Ann Burns (softball), Kevin Craig, (men's water polo), Carrie Forsyth (women's golf), Heidi Moneymaker (gymnastics), Kelly Rulon (women's water polo), Randy Schwartz (baseball), Lynn Shackelford, (men's basketball), Erik Sullivan (men's volleyball)

2024 (7): Milt Davis (football), Rod Foster (men's basketball), Sean Kern (men's water polo), Charlotte Mayorkas (women's golf), Brian Teacher (men's tennis), Vanessa Teff (women's rowing) and Vanessa Zamarripa (women's gymnastics)

2025 (9): Tracey Milburn Bailey (soccer), Brandon Crawford (baseball), Cyndi Gallager (swimming & diving), Mike Franks (tennis), Jason Kapono (men's basketball), Brittani McCullough (gymnastics), Kimberly Po (women's tennis), Sheena Johnson Tosta (track and field), Lisa Willis (women's basketball)

2026 (9): Garrett Atkins (baseball), Kris Farris (football), Sam Mewis (women's soccer), Andre Phillips (men's track & field), Kelly Reeves (beach volleyball/women's volleyball), Matt Reis (men's soccer), Michael Sealy (men's volleyball/women's volleyball coach), Sam Storey (football) and Earl Watson (men's basketball)

== Athletics apparel sponsorships ==
From 1993 to 1999, the school had an apparel contract with Reebok.

In 1999, an agreement was reached with Adidas for six years, ending in June 2005. The deal was to provide equipment and apparel to UCLA's 21 intercollegiate teams. Additional terms of the deal included internship opportunities for UCLA students and an exclusive licensee for athletic replica wear. The reported monetary terms of the agreement included $1.625 million in cash and $1.3 million in equipment each year.

In 2005, the deal was renewed for $2.6 million in cash and $1.6 million in equipment. Additional terms included one full-time Adidas employee on the UCLA campus, $2,500 each year for a "non-UCLA charitable" project selected by the Football or Basketball head coach, game tickets for Adidas executives, radio acknowledgements during games, and appearances by the Football and Basketball head coaches at Adidas events.

In April 2010, a letter of intent to renew was reached between UCLA Athletics and Adidas. By June of that same year the terms of the deal were finalized but not published. In a report, UCLA Athletic Director Dan Guerrero stated that the deal is for seven years and "will approach" the deal Adidas has with Michigan worth $7.5 million.

In May 2016, UCLA signed a 15-year, $280 million deal with sportswear manufacturer Under Armour starting in the 2017–18 season. In June 2020, Under Armour announced that it will be terminating its apparel deal with UCLA.

In December 2020, UCLA signed a 6-year deal with the Jordan Brand to outfit the football and men's and women's basketball teams. Starting July 1, 2021, Nike also outfits the other 25 varsity sports teams at UCLA.

- 1993-1999 Reebok
- 1999-2017 Adidas
- 2017-2021 Under Armour
- 2021-Future Jordan and Nike

== See also ==
- 2019 college admissions bribery scandal
