= Benjamin Kohllöffel =

German tennis player

- ITF name: Benjamin Kohlloeffel
- Country (sports): Germany
- Born: 13 March 1982 (age 43)
- Height: 6 ft 0 in (183 cm)
- Plays: Left-handed
- Prize money: $15,558

Singles
- Highest ranking: No. 461 (5 May 2003)

Doubles
- Highest ranking: No. 715 (19 May 2003)

Benjamin Kohllöffel (born 13 March 1982) is a German former professional tennis player.

A native of Herne, North Rhine-Westphalia, Kohllöffel was a left-handed player and reached a best singles ranking of 461 on the professional tour, winning two ITF Futures titles. He made ATP Challenger quarter-finals at Aschaffenburg in 2001 and Hull in 2002. His only ATP Tour appearances were in qualifying, including for the 2006 Indian Wells Masters.

Kohllöffel played collegiate tennis for the UCLA Bruins and in 2006 became the third German in a row to win the NCAA singles championship, after Benjamin Becker and Benedikt Dorsch. He defeated Somdev Devvarman in the final.

== ITF Futures finals ==
=== Singles: 3 (2–1) ===
Result	W–L	Date	Tournament	Surface	Opponent	Score
Win	1–0	Jul 2001	Germany F8, Leun	Clay	(Germany) Daniel Lesske	6–4, 1–6, 6–2
Loss	1–1	Apr 2003	Japan F3, Kumamoto City	Hard	(South Korea) Yoon Yong-il	3–6, 2–6
Win	2–1	Aug 2005	Germany F11, Essen	Clay	(Serbia and Montenegro) Ilija Bozoljac	2–6, 7–6^{(4)}, 6–2

=== Doubles: 3 (1–2) ===
Result	W–L	Date	Tournament	Surface	Partner	Opponents	Score
Loss	0–1	Jul 2002	Germany F10, Leun	Clay	(Romania) Artemon Apostu-Efremov	(United States) Diego Ayala (United States) Hamid Mirzadeh	6–7^{(4)}, 4–6
Win	1–1	Sep 2002	Sweden F2, Gothenburg	Hard	(Germany) Aleksander Djuranovic	(Canada) Philip Gubenco (Netherlands) Jasper Smit	6–4, 6–2
Loss	1–2	May 2003	Germany F3, Arnsberg	Clay	(Germany) Florian Jeschonek	(Germany) Benedikt Stronk (Germany) Marius Zay	6–3, 6–7^{(7)}, 5–7
