= MyKayla Skinner =

American artistic gymnast (born 1996)

- Full name: MyKayla Brooke Skinner Harmer
- Born: December 9, 1996 (age 29) Gilbert, Arizona, U.S.
- Height: 5 ft 0 in (152 cm)
- Spouse: Jonas Harmer (m. 2019)

Gymnastics career
- Discipline: Women's artistic gymnastics
- Country represented: United States; (2011–2016, 2019–2021)
- College team: Utah Red Rocks (2017–2019)
- Gym: Desert Lights Gymnastics
- Head coaches: Lisa Spini; Megan Marsden; Tom Farden
- Assistant coach: Bruce McGehee
- Retired: August 1, 2021
- Awards: Collegiate Female Athlete of the Year (2020)
Medal record
Event	1st	2nd	3rd
Olympic Games	0	1	0
World Championships	3	0	1
NCAA Championships	2	2	0
Total	5	3	1
Women's artistic gymnastics
Representing United States
Olympic Games
Silver medal – second place	2020 Tokyo	Vault
World Championships
Gold medal – first place	2014 Nanning	Team
Gold medal – first place	2015 Glasgow	Team
Gold medal – first place	2019 Stuttgart	Team
Bronze medal – third place	2014 Nanning	Vault
Pan American Championships
Gold medal – first place	2014 Mississauga	Team
Gold medal – first place	2014 Mississauga	All-Around
Gold medal – first place	2014 Mississauga	Floor Exercise
Gold medal – first place	2014 Mississauga	Vault
FIG World Cup
Event	1st	2nd	3rd
All-Around World Cup	1	1	0
Representing Utah Red Rocks
NCAA Championships
Gold medal – first place	2017 St Louis	Floor Exercise
Gold medal – first place	2018 St Louis	Vault
Silver medal – second place	2017 St Louis	All-Around
Silver medal – second place	2018 St Louis	All-Around

YouTube information
- Channel: Myk & Jonas
- Genre: Vlog
- Subscribers: 122 thousand
- Views: 27.2 million
- Last updated: April 16, 2026

MyKayla Brooke Skinner Harmer (/mɪˈkeɪlə/ mi-KAY-lə; born December 9, 1996) is an American former artistic gymnast. She was the 2020 Olympic vault silver medalist, competing as an individual, and was an alternate for the 2016 Olympic team. Skinner competed at the 2014 World Championships, where she contributed to the U.S. team's gold medal, also winning an individual bronze medal on vault. She won 11 total medals at the USA National Championships during her senior career. She also competed for the University of Utah's gymnastics team and was a two-time NCAA champion while also setting Pac-12 records for conference honors. She also won team gold medals at the 2015 and 2019 World Championships, and retired in August 2021.

== Elite gymnastics career ==
=== 2011–2012: Career beginnings ===
Skinner was the junior individual all-around champion of the 2011 American Classic. She was named to the junior U.S. national team after finishing 10th in the all-around and second on vault at the National Championships.

Skinner became age-eligible for senior-level competition in 2012 and was added to the U.S. senior national team. She was a member of the winning U.S. squad at the City of Jesolo Trophy in March. In June, she finished 15th all-around at the U.S. Nationals and third on vault.

=== 2013–2015: Early success ===
Skinner competed at the Fiesta Bowl in 2013, winning every individual event except for the floor exercise, where she tied for eighth place. At the 2013 P&G Championships, she placed third on vault and floor, and finished sixth in the all-around.

In 2014, Skinner competed at the City of Jesolo Trophy, helping the U.S. win gold as a team. She won the gold medal for individual vault and floor exercises and placed fourth in the all-around. Skinner competed at the Pan American Championships in Mississauga, Canada. She helped the U.S. team place first in the team competition. She placed first in the individual all-around competition with a score of 56.850, including first on vault, scoring 15.037, seventh on balance beam, scoring 13.475, and first on floor exercise, scoring 14.750.

Skinner won a gold medal with the U.S. in the team competition at the 2014 World Championships in Nanning, China, contributing a score of 15.775 on the vault and 14.666 on the floor. In the event finals, Skinner won a bronze medal in the vault, with a score of 15.366, and placed fourth in the floor exercise final, scoring a 14.700, losing a second bronze medal to Aliya Mustafina, who had a score of 14.733.

Skinner placed second to Simone Biles at the 2015 AT&T American Cup in Arlington, Texas in 2015 with a score of 57.832.

At the U.S. Classic on July 25, 2015, Skinner finished 7th in the all-around, scoring 55.500. She finished 12th on the balance beam, scoring 12.800. ninth on the balance beam, scoring 13.500, second with a 15.100 on vault, and placed 10th on bars with a score of 14.100.

As a senior national team member, Skinner was invited to the 2015 Worlds Selection Camp in September and October. On October 8, she was named an alternate to the USA team for the 2015 World Artistic Gymnastics Championships.

=== 2016: Olympic alternate ===
Skinner finished 10th in the all-around and won a silver medal on vault and a bronze medal on floor exercise at the 2016 U.S. National Championships, earning her an invitation to the U.S. Olympic Trials.

At the Olympic Trials, Skinner finished fourth in the all-around and was named an alternate to the 2016 Olympic team.

=== 2019: Elite comeback ===
On April 25, 2019, Skinner returned to elite gymnastics to attempt to compete at the 2020 Olympics. She was invited to attend the June national team training camp.

Skinner returned to elite competition at the 2019 U.S. Classic. With a score of 14.900, she tied for second with Carey on vault behind Biles. She placed 11th on balance beam and 14th on floor exercise.

At the 2019 U.S. National Championships, Skinner competed in all events and tied for ninth with Grace McCallum and was added to the national team.

In September, Skinner competed at the U.S. World Championships trials, where she placed fourth all-around behind Biles, Sunisa Lee, and Kara Eaker. She placed fourth on the balance beam behind Biles, Eaker, and Morgan Hurd. She was named as an alternate for the 2019 World Championships in Stuttgart, Germany.

=== 2020–2021: Postponed Olympic Games ===
Skinner competed at the International Gymnix meet in Montreal in March 2020 with Emily Lee, Lilly Lippeatt, and Faith Torrez. She placed second in the all-around behind Lee and won gold medals in the vault, uneven bars, and floor exercise titles to help the U.S.A team win gold.

In January 2021, Skinner revealed that she was hospitalized with pneumonia that resulted from COVID-19. In March, Skinner attended at a national team camp and was named to the national team.

Skinner competed at the U.S. Classic in May 2021, where she finished first on vault and 10th in the all-around. Skinner was one of five gymnasts featured on the Peacock docuseries Golden: The Journey of USA's Elite Gymnasts. At the National Championships, Skinner won silver on vault. She was added to the national team and qualified to compete at the Olympic Trials.

Skinner finished fifth in the all-around at the Olympic Trials and was selected to represent the U.S. in the non-nominative spot at the Tokyo Olympics in 2021, meaning she would compete as an individual instead of on the four-member U.S. team. The decision to include Skinner was controversial because Carey's strengths in vault and floor exercise matched those of Skinner, instead of having the second gymnast be proficient on bars and beam. As a result of the decision, Carey and Skinner would compete against each other and cause the U.S. to be eligible for fewer medals.

At the Olympic Games, Skinner performed the all-around during qualifications, hitting all four of her routines. Despite finishing 11th place in the all-around and fourth place on the vault, she did not qualify for either final due to two-per-country limitations. Biles, Lee, and Carey finished ahead of her in the all-around and on vault. Skinner took Biles' place in the vault final when Biles dropped out due to mental health issues. Skinner finished second, winning the silver medal with an average score for her, Cheng and Amanar vaults of 14.916.

On July 3, Skinner announced that she would retire from competitive gymnastics after the Olympics. She returned to the University of Utah to complete her degree in broadcast journalism.

== Collegiate gymnastics career ==
In November 2014, Skinner signed a National Letter of Intent for the University of Utah and the Utah Red Rocks program. Utah coach Greg Marsden said that Skinner was "one of the top gymnasts in the world" with "the potential to get even better as a result of her passion for the sport. She loves to flip and twist." In April 2015, Skinner announced that she would defer enrolling at Utah by a year to concentrate on making the 2016 Olympic team.

=== 2016–2017 season ===
Skinner enrolled at the University of Utah in 2016 as an NCAA women's gymnastics team member and competed in the all-around. During her freshman season Skinner won 43 total events. She was the PAC-12 champion in the individual all-around and on vault and floor exercises. At the NCAA Championships, Skinner finished second in the individual all-around with a score of 39.6125, behind Alex McMurtry of Florida. She was a national champion on floor exercise with a 9.9625 alongside Ashleigh Gnat of LSU and was also fifth on vault and eighth on balance beam. The following day, she led Utah to fifth place in the team competition finals. She is one of the only gymnasts in NCAA history to do a Silivas, which is a Double Twisting Double Back.

=== 2017–2018 season ===
In the 2018 season, Skinner hit all 54 of her routines without a fall. At the PAC-12 Championships, she helped Utah finish in second place. Individually, Skinner tied for first in the all-around with Kyla Ross of UCLA and tied for first on floor exercise with Katelyn Ohashi of UCLA and Elizabeth Price of Stanford. At the 2018 NCAA Women's Gymnastics Championship Skinner won silver in the all-around and tied for first on vault with Brenna Dowell of Oklahoma and Alex McMurtry of Florida.

=== 2018–2019 season ===
At the PAC-12 Championships, Skinner scored her third career perfect 10 on floor exercise. She finished second in the all-around and the team finals and won gold on floor and vault. During the regional finals, Skinner fell on her uneven bars routine, ending her 161 routine streak without a fall, but setting a new record. At the NCAA Championships Skinner placed seventh in the all-around after a subpar beam routine. She recorded the second-highest vault and floor exercise scores but placed fifth due to four gymnasts tying for the title. Utah finished fourth in their semifinal and did not advance to the finals.

=== Career perfect 10.0 ===
Season	Date	Event	Meet
2017	March 3, 2017	Floor Exercise	Utah vs Stanford
2017	March 18, 2017	Floor Exercise	PAC-12 Championships
2019	March 22, 2019	Floor Exercise	PAC-12 Championships

== Personal life ==
MyKayla Skinner was born to Cris and Kym Skinner on December 9, 1996, in Gilbert, Arizona. She has three older siblings, Jeremy, Chelsea and Katie, two former gymnasts. Skinner is a member of the Church of Jesus Christ of Latter-day Saints. She grew up in Gilbert, Arizona, and said that her role model was Olympic gold medalist Shawn Johnson.

Skinner trained at Desert Lights Gymnastics in Chandler, Arizona, under head coach Lisa Spini. She attended Higley High School in 2011 as a freshman and was homeschooled starting in 2012.

On October 16, 2019, Skinner announced on Instagram that she was engaged to Jonas Harmer, whom she met while studying at the University of Utah. Skinner and Harmer were married on November 14, 2019. They have a daughter, Charlotte Jane, born in September 2023, and a son Lewis Wells, born in March 2026.

== Controversies ==
=== Reaction to 2016 Olympic team ===
Following being named an alternate to the 2016 Olympic team, Skinner retweeted a photograph of the U.S. team with her picture edited over that of Gabby Douglas and included monkey emojis, which are widely viewed as "racist tropes." She later apologized; "I'm so sorry if I offended anyone. I was in the wrong by retweeting that tweet! I'm so grateful to be part of the team! Go USA."

=== Criticism of 2024 Olympic team ===
In a since-deleted YouTube video, Skinner criticized the 2024 Olympic team, stating that the talent and work ethic was lacking compared to previous teams. She attributed this reduced work ethic to the U.S. Center for SafeSport, an organization set up to reduce sexual abuse in Olympic sports in the wake of the USA Gymnastics sex abuse scandal, and to the retirement of controversial women's team coordinator, Márta Károlyi. Skinner also stated that Sunisa Lee did not have a gymnast body and mispronounced Hezly Rivera's name. These comments resulted in many members of the gymnastics community speaking out against Skinner. After the 2024 U.S. Olympic team won the team gold medal, Simone Biles referenced Skinner's comments in an Instagram post. Skinner subsequently blocked Biles on social media. Several prominent current and past American gymnasts expressed support for Biles's post and criticized Skinner's comments.

=== Bullying allegations against Simone Biles ===
In June 2025 Skinner released a statement via One America News claiming she "endured being belittled, dismissed, and ostracized behind the scenes by Simone [Biles]." During an interview with Will Cain on Fox News, she was prompted to describe instances where Biles had bullied her in the past and Skinner only cited Biles' reaction to Skinner's YouTube commentary on the 2024 Olympic Trials where she claimed that the gymnasts competing "don't work as hard" and "don't have the work ethic."

== Competitive history ==
Year	Event	Team	AA	VT	UB	BB	FX
Junior elite
2010	U.S. National Championships		25	8	30	22	33
2011	WOGA Classic			2nd place, silver medalist(s)			
2011	Nastia Liukin Cup		5				
2011	U.S. National Championships		10	2nd place, silver medalist(s)	20	15	15
Senior elite
2012	City of Jesolo Trophy		10				
2012	US National Championships		15	3rd place, bronze medalist(s)	20	17	11
2013	U.S. Classic		10	2nd place, silver medalist(s)	13	9	13
2013	U.S. National Championships		6	3rd place, bronze medalist(s)	9	11	3rd place, bronze medalist(s)
2014	City of Jesolo Trophy	1st place, gold medalist(s)	4	1st place, gold medalist(s)			1st place, gold medalist(s)
2014	U.S. Classic		5	2nd place, silver medalist(s)	10	6	6
2014	U.S. National Championships		5	2nd place, silver medalist(s)	11	6	2nd place, silver medalist(s)
2014	Pan American Championships	1st place, gold medalist(s)	1st place, gold medalist(s)	1st place, gold medalist(s)		7	1st place, gold medalist(s)
2014	World Championships	1st place, gold medalist(s)		3rd place, bronze medalist(s)			4
2015	American Cup		2nd place, silver medalist(s)				
2015	U.S. Classic		7	2nd place, silver medalist(s)	10	12	9
2015	U.S. National Championships		7	2nd place, silver medalist(s)	16	7	3rd place, bronze medalist(s)
2015	World Championships	(gold) (Note: Skinner was the Team USA alternate.)					
2016	Glasgow World Cup		1st place, gold medalist(s)				
2016	City of Jesolo Trophy	1st place, gold medalist(s)	5	1st place, gold medalist(s)			
2016	U.S. Classic			2nd place, silver medalist(s)	16	8	
2016	U.S. National Championships		10	2nd place, silver medalist(s)	17	18	3rd place, bronze medalist(s)
2016	U.S. Olympic Trials		4	2nd place, silver medalist(s)	12	5	5
2016	Olympic Games						
NCAA
2017	PAC-12 Championships	1st place, gold medalist(s)	1st place, gold medalist(s)	1st place, gold medalist(s)	6	7	1st place, gold medalist(s)
2017	NCAA Championships	5	2nd place, silver medalist(s)	5		8	1st place, gold medalist(s)
2018	PAC-12 Championships	2nd place, silver medalist(s)	1st place, gold medalist(s)	3rd place, bronze medalist(s)	2nd place, silver medalist(s)	3rd place, bronze medalist(s)	1st place, gold medalist(s)
2018	NCAA Championships	5	2nd place, silver medalist(s)	1st place, gold medalist(s)	7	4	5
2019	PAC-12 Championships	2nd place, silver medalist(s)	2nd place, silver medalist(s)	1st place, gold medalist(s)	2nd place, silver medalist(s)	9	1st place, gold medalist(s)
2019	NCAA Championships	SF	7	5	6		5
2019	Senior elite						
2019	U.S. Classic					11	14
2019	U.S. National Championships		8	3rd place, bronze medalist(s)	9	14	5
2019	Worlds Team Selection Camp		4	3rd place, bronze medalist(s)	6	8	5
2019	World Championships	(gold)					
2020	International Gymnix	1st place, gold medalist(s)	2nd place, silver medalist(s)	1st place, gold medalist(s)	1st place, gold medalist(s)		1st place, gold medalist(s)
2021	U.S. Classic		10	1st place, gold medalist(s)	13	25	10
2021	U.S. National Championships		9	2nd place, silver medalist(s)	9	16	10
2021	Olympic Trials		5	2nd place, silver medalist(s)	9	7	7
2021	Olympic Games			2nd place, silver medalist(s)			
