= Yvonne Tousek =

Canadian artistic gymnast (born 1980)

Yvonne Tousek-Renne
- Born: February 23, 1980 (age 46) Kitchener, Ontario

Gymnastics career
- Discipline: Women's artistic gymnastics
- Country represented: Canada
- College team: UCLA
- Gym: Cambridge Kips
- Head coaches: Elvira Saadi (elite), Valorie Kondos Field (UCLA)
Medal record
Representing Canada
Pan American Games
Gold medal – first place	1999 Winnipeg	Team
Gold medal – first place	1999 Winnipeg	Uneven Bars
Gold medal – first place	1999 Winnipeg	Floor Exercise
Representing UCLA Bruins
NCAA National Championships
Gold medal – first place	2001 Athens	Team
Gold medal – first place	2001 Athens	Uneven Bars
Gold medal – first place	2003 Lincoln	Team
Gold medal – first place	2004 Los Angeles	Team
Bronze medal – third place	2001 Athens	All-Around
Bronze medal – third place	2002 Tuscaloosa	Team

Yvonne Tousek-Renne (born February 23, 1980) is a retired artistic gymnast who competed for her native Canada in the 1996 Summer Olympics in Atlanta and the 2000 Summer Olympics in Sydney.

== Elite career ==
Tousek-Renne was born on February 23, 1980, in Kitchener, Ontario, and qualified to the all-around finals at both the 1996 and 2000 Summer Olympic Games, placing 26th all-around in Atlanta and 32nd all-around in Sydney.

She also competed in four World Gymnastics Championships: 1995, 1996, 1997 and 1999. Her best finish at a Worlds was 7th place on floor exercise at the 1999 World Artistic Gymnastics Championships in Tianjin, China.

At the 1999 World Championships, she also performed an original gymnastics skill that bears her name in the artistic gymnastics Code of Points: the Tousek, a cross-wise back handspring on balance beam.

At the 1999 Pan American Games in Winnipeg, Manitoba, Canada, Tousek-Renne won floor exercise and uneven bars and placed 4th all-around.

In 2000, Tousek-Renne won the all-around, bars and floor exercise at the Canadian National Gymnastics Championships, and she placed second on vault and balance beam.

During her elite career, Tousek-Renne trained with coach Elvira Saadi at Cambridge Kips in Cambridge, Ontario.

== Eponymous skill ==
Tousek has one eponymous skill listed in the Code of Points.

Apparatus	Name	Description	Difficulty (Note: Valid for the 2025–2028 Code of Points)
Balance beam	Tousek	Flic-flac with step-out from side position	D (0.4)

== College career ==
During her college career with the UCLA Bruins, the freshman Tousek-Renne earned the uneven bars title at the 2001 NCAA women's gymnastic championships.

She placed fifth on bars in the event finals at the 2002 and 2003 NCAA championships, and she placed fifth on balance beam in the 2004 NCAA championships.

She also scored perfect 10s on uneven bars in the 2003 UCLA vs. Arkansas meet and the 2004 UCLA vs. Michigan meet.

== Cirque du Soleil ==
In 2006, she went to work as an acrobat for the Cirque du Soleil show Corteo. Her acts in the show included "Animation," which sets the stage for the show, plus the trampoline act "Bouncing Beds" and the high-bar act "Tournik". She also performed two comedic turns as an oversized golf ball and as half of a costumed horse. As of 2016, Tousek-Renne, who plays an Amazon in the show, continues to travel the world with Cirque du Soleil.

== Personal ==
In 2012, Tousek-Renne married Yohann Renne, a Cirque high-bar artist from France. Tousek-Renne and Renne had their first child, a girl, in early June 2014. Tousek-Renne was on maternity leave in early 2014 and toured North America with Renne, who is head coach on Cirque du Soleil's 2014 touring show, Amalun.
