= Artistic gymnastics in the United States =

- Governing body: USA Gymnastics

National competitions
- U.S. National Championships; U.S. Classic; U.S. Olympic Trials; Winter Cup

International competitions
- American Cup (1976–2020)

Artistic gymnastics is a type of gymnastics in which athletes compete with short routines on various equipment, including bars, beams, rings, pommel horses, vaulting tables, and on a sprung floor. Gymnastics is well-established in the United States, where available programs range from recreational classes, casual summer camps, and children's leagues; to highly competitive collegiate leagues and four national teams (a junior and senior men's team and a junior and senior women's team). Although this is not unique to the United States, due to the physically demanding nature of the sport there are fewer options for adult gymnastics outside the elite level, although local parks and recreation departments often have limited offerings.

== Organization ==
USA Gymnastics is the national governing body for several gymnastics disciplines in the United States: artistic gymnastics, rhythmic gymnastics, trampolining, tumbling, acrobatic gymnastics, Gymnastics for All, and parkour). Since its establishment in 1963, USAG has been responsible for selecting national teams, providing training facilities, encouraging participation and building a strong gymnastics program that involves all types of athletes. USA Gymnastics is a member of the continental Pan American Gymnastics Union, referred to as PAGU and is also part of the international governing body for gymnastics, International Federation of Gymnastics.

== Elite program ==
The international elite level is the highest level one can reach in USA Gymnastics for artistic gymnastics, permitting gymnasts to compete in domestic elite competitions, be recruited to U.S. national teams and represent the United States at the World Championships and the Olympic Games. It is estimated that a competitive gymnast's chances of reaching this level are 1-5%. To qualify for elite status, there are various criteria a gymnast must meet. As of 2015, first-year elite trialists must score 51.500 (Junior) or 53.000 (Senior) in the 2015 National Elite Qualifier event to gain international elite status. For returning elite participants, gymnasts must have competed at the previous year's U.S. Nationals. To qualify for the 2015 U.S. Nationals, there are no automatic qualifiers for Juniors and qualification spots are decided from 2014 scores or results from 2015 Classic. For seniors, they receive automatic qualification if they represented the U.S. during the season or at the 2014 World Championships. In the men's program, gymnasts qualify to the National Championships through a National Qualifier event.

=== USA Gymnastics at the Olympics ===
Currently the United States is ranked second in the medal table for artistic gymnastics, behind the Soviet Union.

1904 Summer Olympic Games St. Louis, Missouri, U.S.A.
John Duha (USA)	Bronze	PB
George Eyser (USA)	Gold	VT, PB, RC
George Eyser (USA)	Silver	PH
George Eyser (USA)	Bronze	HB
Herman Glass (USA)	Gold	SR
Anton Heida (USA)	Gold	PH, VT, HB
Anton Heida (USA)	Silver	PB
Edward Hennig (USA)	Gold	HB, IC
Charles Krause (USA)	Silver	RC
William Merz (USA)	Silver	SR
William Merz (USA)	Bronze	PH
Emil Voigt (USA)	Silver	IC
Emil Voigt (USA)	Bronze	SR, RC
Ralph Wilson (USA)	Bronze	IC
Total: 20	9 gold 4 silver 6 bronze	

=== National teams ===
USA Gymnastics has four national teams; Two for women (Junior and Senior) and two for men (Junior and Senior). The national team represents the U.S. in international competitions such as the Olympic Games, Pan American Games and World Championships. USA Gymnastics typically funds around 12-16 National team spots for seniors and 6-8 for juniors but places can be awarded based on need. The men's U.S. National Team has a Senior team and its Junior team is divided into two age groups; 15-16 and 17-18.

== College gymnastics ==
College gymnastics is an ever-growing sport in the United States. All of the college gymnastics is governed by the NCAA, excluding club gymnastics, which is headed by the NAIGC (National Association of International Collegiate Clubs). College gymnastics is a select college program with only 84 schools sponsoring it, throughout the three athletic divisions. In women's gymnastics, there are 82 schools sponsoring the sport, throughout Divisions I, II and III. Conversely, in men's gymnastics, only 16 schools sponsor an NCAA men's gymnastics team; all of which are in I, excluding Springfield College which is in Division III. There are many club teams for men's gymnastics, however. This is largely due to the fact that schools run out of money to fund the program and therefore it is cut from the school's program. An excellent example of this would be the Temple Owls team, who cut the program following the 2014 season, due to reasons such as "title IX, student welfare and facility needs".

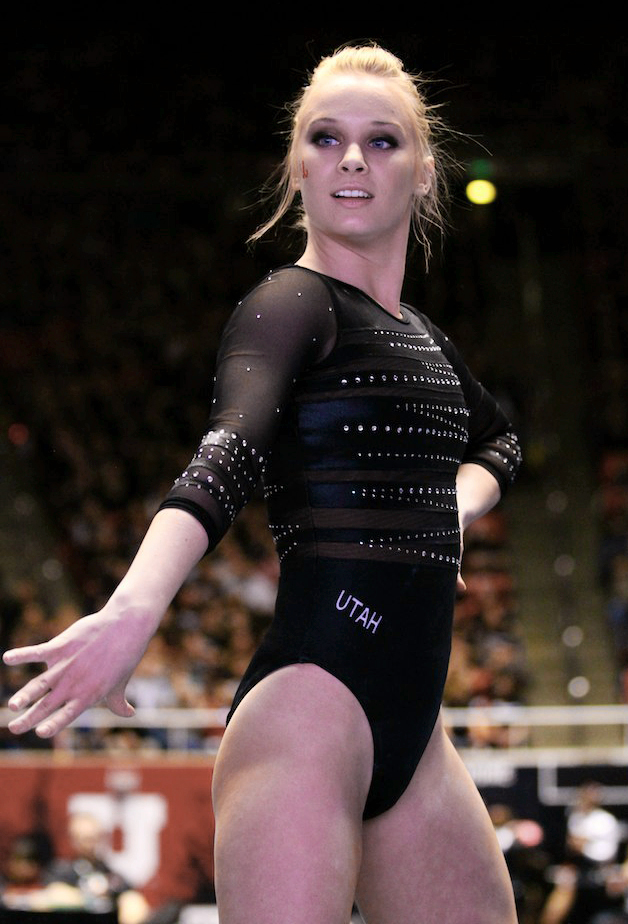
Georgia Dabritz performing during a Utah Red Rocks vs Stanford Cardinal meet in 2013.

Title IX has been a factor in the abolition of a few gymnastics programs; Massachusetts Institute of Technology and James Madison University both cut their women's gymnastics programs in the 2000s, as did Cal State Fullerton, just after the 2010-11 season, due to "budget constraints". Although many programs have folded in recent years, some have opened. Notably, Lindenwood University added their gymnastics program for the 2012-13 season and were the first school in 10 years to add a gymnastics program, since University of Arkansas added their program in 2001. College gymnastics is a head count sport therefore, meaning that the NCAA limits the total number of individuals that can receive athletic scholarships but allows an individual to receive up to a full ride scholarship. For women's gymnastics, it is 12 for DI and 6 for DII and for men's gymnastics, it is 6.3. No financial aid is award for DIII teams, like all NCAA sports. Gymnastics scholarships are fiercely competitive with many high school gymnasts wanting full-ride scholarships to top schools. Typically, women's gymnasts will need to be at least Level 10 to make a DI team but it is common to find Elite-level gymnasts, the top level of gymnastics, too. For DII scholarships, coaches would prefer a Level 10 gymnast but it is not unusual to find Level 9s earning full-ride scholarships to schools of this division. In DIII, Level 9s or Level 8s will probably compete for these teams, not on scholarships though. For top schools, such as the University of Florida, the University of Alabama and the University of Oklahoma, their rosters are likely to be filled with former elites, possibly even Olympians and National Team members, and strong Level 10 gymnasts. These teams have the luxury to be selective with recruiting because many talented gymnasts approach them, instead of vice versa. In 2014, it was estimated that there were 19,000 female high school gymnasts and 1,733 college gymnasts in the country; making the chances of a high school gymnast earning a college scholarship around 9.0%. In men's gymnastics, most of the DI teams look for Level 10s and Elites, too. Unlike women's gymnastics, there are less male high school gymnasts wanting scholarships increasing the chances of earning a college scholarship to 19.1%.

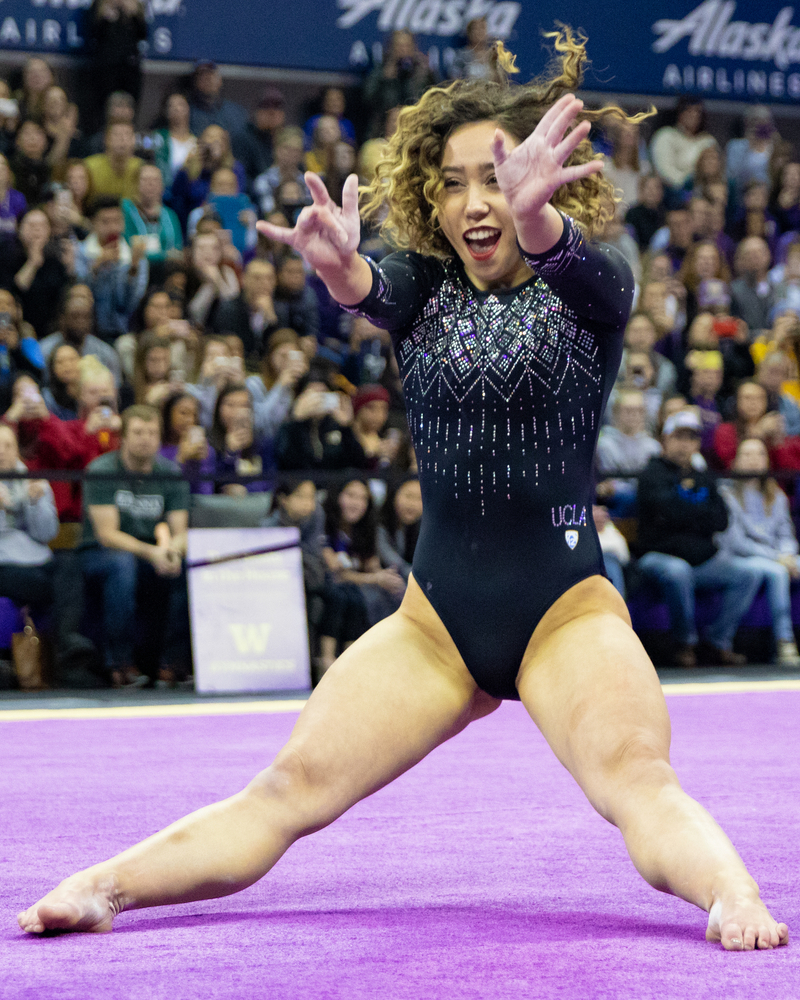
Katelyn Ohashi competing for UCLA in 2019

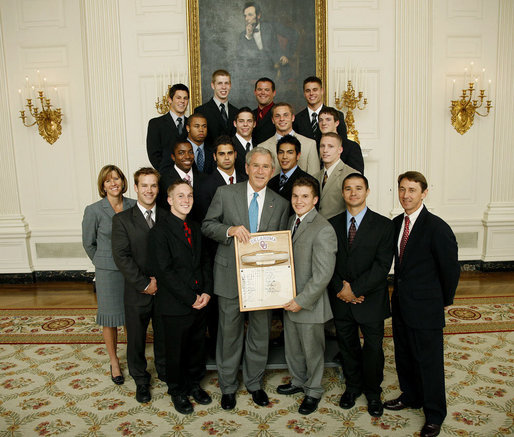
The Oklahoma Sooners men's gymnastics team at the White House in 2008.

Another factor added to the contest to earn a college scholarship in gymnastics is the, which has only recently started to occur, interest in college gymnastics from international gymnasts. In previous years, college gymnastics has seen gymnasts from Canada, Great Britain, Australia, New Zealand, the Netherlands and Mexico. Typically, international recruits will be former Olympians, such as Marissa King, Brittany Rogers and Olivia Vivian. The most 'culturally diverse' women's gymnastics programs could be known to be teams such as UCLA Bruins, Oregon State Beavers, Florida Gators and LSU Tigers; all of whom have had 2+ international team members every year since 2010. Generally, not as many international gymnasts compete in men's gymnastics, but there is still a handful of international collegiate gymnasts.

During the regular season, teams will compete in dual meets against other schools. Typically, but not exclusively, teams will choose their schedule/opponent based on if they are in the same conference as one another. Most school's gymnastics programs compete in indoor arenas with a capacity of around 5,000-15,000; often shared with the school's basketball team. The Utah Red Rocks have the highest average home attendance and have done for several years, averaging 14,858.33 spectators during the 2015 season. Most programs have a schedule of around 10-12 meets during the regular season, competing every week. Once the regular season concludes, teams prepare for their Conference Championships. Based on performances at the Conference championships, teams advance to NCAA Regionals and are seeded accordingly. To qualify for regionals, the NCAA uses a specially formulated method called the Regional Qualifying Score (RQS). This formula is used for teams and individuals, calculated by a teams's/individual's best six regular season scores, three of which must be away, then the highest score is eliminated and the remaining five scores are averaged. At Regionals, of which there are six hosted in the nation, the top two teams and top two all-rounders, who are not on a qualifying team, advance to Nationals. Alternatively, if a gymnast, who is not on a qualifying team, wins an individual event (i.e. Bars), she will receive an automatic berth to Nationals, just to compete on that single event. The final event of the season is the National Championships. In the semifinals, the 12 teams are split into 2 sessions. The top 3 teams in each session advance to the Team Finals, also called the 'Super Six'. Also, there are event finals for the top gymnasts on each event. The men's format differs slightly.

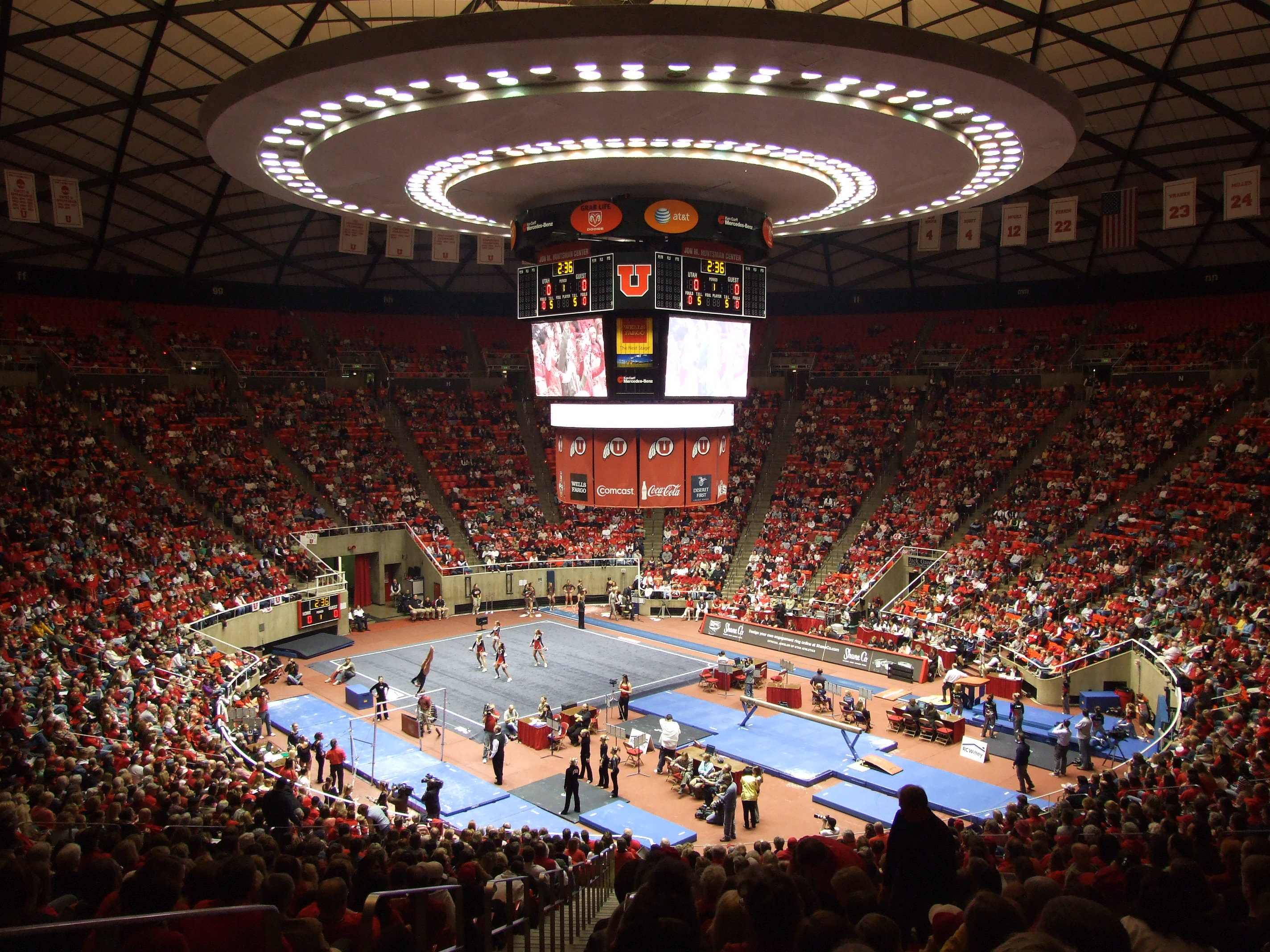
The Jon M. Huntsman Center in the midst of a Utah Red Rocks gymnastics meet.

College gymnastics receives adequate television coverage with programming contracts from SEC Network, Big Ten Network and Pac-12 Network, who often broadcast meets during the regular season. However, some Pac-12 Conference coaches, including Greg Marsden and Chris Waller, have been demanding more television coverage for women's collegiate gymnastics.

== Club gymnastics ==
Currently, there are around 86,800 athletes enrolled in artistic gymnastics disciplines in the United States. This figure makes up just under 85% of the total number of athletes enrolled in any gymnastics discipline in USA Gymnastics; clearly showing that artistic gymnastics is the most popular gymnastics discipline in the country.

=== Development Program ===
In both men's and women's artistic gymnastics, the Development Program, formerly known as the Junior Olympic program, provides a progression of foundational skills that athletes are expected to develop. For women, there are ten levels ranging from Level 1 to Level 10. Levels 1-3 are developmental levels and are for young athletes. Levels 4-5 are compulsory levels and require more difficult skills. Levels 6-10 are the optional levels. In optionals, gymnasts can choose the routines they do instead of being given them. The Men's Development Program differs slightly. Levels 1-3 are referred to as the Essential Elements program and use individual stations called "boxes" to teach boys fundamental skills. Levels 4-7 are compulsory levels, and Levels 8-10 are optional. In the women's program, there is also the Xcel program. This gives gymnasts to give competitive gymnastics a try but not to compete in levels.

The Development program competitive season usually lasts from December–April with National Championships held in May. Teams travel to invitationals to compete against other clubs and to win medals and get experience. Also, it is not uncommon for college recruiters to be at the bigger meets so that is another incentive and also, top teams win prize money at many events. USA Gymnastics sanctions over 4,000 invitationals during the year.

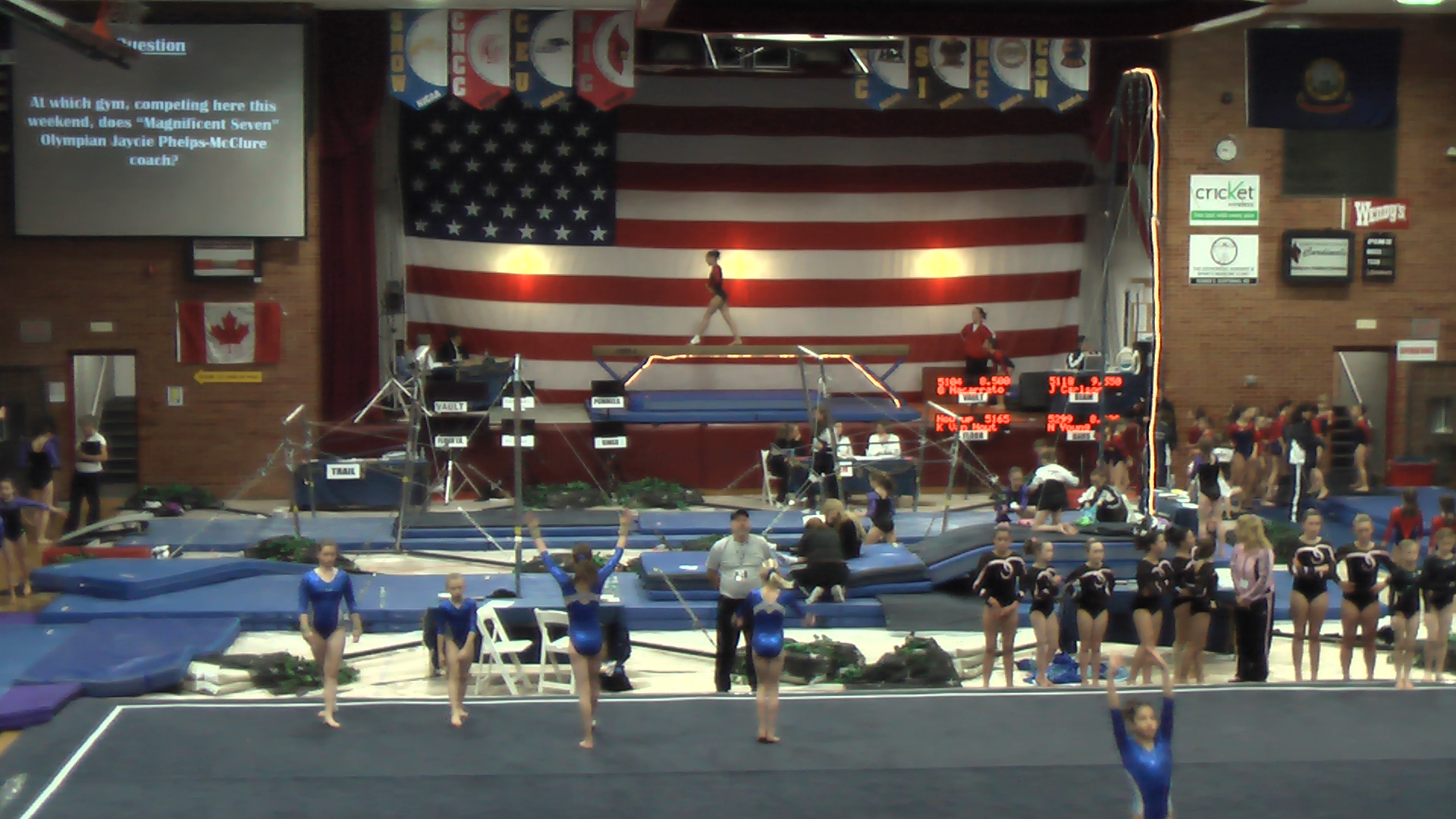
An example of a typical Junior Olympic gymnastics meet layout.

In the Women's Artistic Development program, a televised Level 10 event called the Nastia Liukin Cup takes place every March; and has done since 2010. The event is named after 2008 Olympian Nastia Liukin and is held in conjunction with the AT&T American Cup taking place the Friday night before. To earn a qualification berth to the Nastia Liukin Cup, gymnasts compete in selected invitationals during the season and the top gymnasts in the Junior and Senior divisions compete at the Cup. Since 2014, there has been a separate competition for both age divisions. In the past, various U.S. National Team members have come from the competition; including 2012 Olympic Champion, Gabby Douglas, who came 4th in the inaugural 2010 competition.

Development National Championships is the final event of the season. At Nationals, there are eight age divisions; ranging from Junior A-D and Senior A-D and gymnasts are allotted into these categories depending on their birth date. To qualify to Nationals as a woman, a gymnast must place in the top seven with a minimum score of 35.00 in the all-around at Regionals in her age division. Athletes who placed below the top seven may serve as alternates, and top all-around and individual event athletes who do not qualify for Nationals may be placed in an All-Star Session. The men's artistic gymnastics rules and policies state that the qualification process for Nationals will be posted to the USA Gymnastics website by April 1 of each year.
