= Jeanette Antolin =

American gymnast (born 1981)

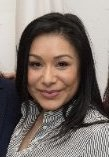
- Antolin in 2018

Personal information
- Born: October 5, 1981 (age 44) Paradise, California, U.S.

Gymnastics career
- Discipline: Women's artistic gymnastics
Medal record
Representing United States
Pan American Games
Silver medal – second place	1999 Winnipeg	Team
Representing UCLA Bruins
NCAA Championships
Gold medal – first place	2001 Athens	Team
Gold medal – first place	2003 Lincoln	Team
Gold medal – first place	2004 Los Angeles	Team
Bronze medal – third place	2002 Tuscaloosa	Team

Jeanette Antolin (born October 5, 1981) is an American former artistic gymnast who was a member of the U.S. national team from 1995 to 2000. In 1999, she competed at the Pan American Games, where she helped the U.S. win a team silver medal, and the World Artistic Gymnastics Championships. She then joined the UCLA Bruins.

== Early life ==
Antolin was born in Paradise, California, in 1981. She began gymnastics in 1984.

== Junior career ==
Antolin became a member of the U.S. national team in 1995 and competed in the junior division. At that year's U.S. Classic, she won the silver medal in the all-around and the gold medal on uneven bars, and finished eighth on balance beam and fourth on floor. At the National Championships, she finished ninth in the all-around and sixth on uneven bars.

At the 1996 U.S. Classic, Antolin won gold in the all-around and silver on floor; she also finished eighth on vault and seventh on uneven bars. At the National Championships, she finished fifth in the all-around. That year, she also competed at the China Cup, where she finished fourth in the all-around and won a bronze medal on uneven bars.

== Senior career ==
At the 1997 U.S. Classic, Antolin was fourth in the all-around. She was fifth on vault and won the bronze medal on uneven bars and the gold medal on balance beam. At the National Championships, she won a bronze medal on vault and finished 10th in the all-around, 11th on uneven bars, 12th on balance beam, and 16th on floor. She was an alternate for the World Championships team.

At the 1998 American Classic, Antolin won silver on uneven bars and bronze on balance beam; she also finished sixth in the all-around, 10th on vault, and 20th on floor. At the National Championships, she was sixth in the all-around. She won the bronze medal on uneven bars and was 10th on vault, ninth on balance beam, and 11th on floor.

In 1998, Antolin competed in five international competitions. With Jay Thornton, she finished 11th in mixed pairs at the 1998 Goodwill Games. At the Monte Fiore Friendly Cup in Italy, she won a silver medal in the all-around and gold medals on vault, uneven bars, and floor. At the Como Cup in Italy, she won gold in the all-around. At the Arthur Gander Memorial in Switzerland, she was seventh in the all-around and won the gold medal on balance beam. At the Grand Prix Zurich, also in Switzerland, she won a gold medal on uneven bars and finished fifth on balance beam and sixth on floor.

At the 1999 American Classic and Pan American Trials, Antolin was fourth in the all-around. At the Pan American Games in Winnipeg, she helped the U.S. win silver in the team competition. At the World Team Trials, she finished second in the all-around. She was named to the World Championships team, and at the 1999 World Artistic Gymnastics Championships in Tianjin, she helped the U.S. finish sixth.

At the 2000 Spieth Sogipa in Brazil, Antolin helped the U.S. win the gold medal in the team competition. This was her last year as a member of the national team.

== College career ==
Antolin was a member of the UCLA Bruins women's gymnastics team and helped them win NCAA titles in 2001, 2003, and 2004. In 2004, she was named the Sports Illustrated On Campus National Gymnast of the Year.

=== Career Perfect 10.0 ===
Season	Date	Event	Meet
2003	February 7, 2003	Vault	UCLA @ Stanford
2003	February 16, 2003	Vault	UCLA @ Arizona State
2003	March 29, 2003	Vault	Pac-10 Championship
2004	January 10, 2004	Vault	UCLA vs. Utah
2004	January 25, 2004	Vault	UCLA @ Minnesota
2004	February 13, 2003	Vault	UCLA @ California
2004	February 22, 2004	Vault	UCLA vs. Oregon State
2004	February 22, 2004	Floor Exercise	UCLA vs. Oregon State
2004	February 27, 2004	Vault	UCLA @ Washington
2004	March 7, 2004	Vault	UCLA vs. Michigan
2004	March 7, 2004	Floor Exercise	UCLA vs. Michigan
2004	March 12, 2004	Vault	UCLA @ Florida
2004	March 20, 2004	Vault	Pac-10 Championship
2004	April 3, 2004	Vault	NC State Regional

== Lawsuit ==
In 2017, Antolin filed a lawsuit alleging that, during her gymnastics career, she had been sexually abused by the national team doctor, Larry Nassar. Dozens of former gymnasts have made similar allegations against him. Antolin and two others, Jamie Dantzscher and Jessica Howard, described the abuse in an appearance on 60 Minutes in February.
