= Jamie Dantzscher =

American artistic gymnast

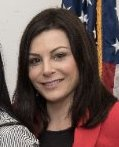
- Dantzscher in 2018

Personal information
- Full name: Jamie Annette Dantzscher
- Born: May 2, 1982 (age 44) Canoga Park, Los Angeles, California, U.S.

Gymnastics career
- Discipline: Women's artistic gymnastics
- Country represented: United States; (1994–2001 (USA))
- College team: UCLA Bruins
- Club: Charter Oak Gliders
- Former coaches: Beth Rybacki; Steve Rybacki
- Music: "My Drag" (1999); "La Cumparsita" (2000)
Medal record
Women's artistic gymnastics
Representing the United States
Olympic Games
Bronze medal – third place	2000 Sydney	Team
Pan American Games
Silver medal – second place	1999 Winnipeg	Team
Representing UCLA Bruins
NCAA Championships
Gold medal – first place	2001 Athens	Team
Gold medal – first place	2002 Tuscaloosa	All-Around
Gold medal – first place	2002 Tuscaloosa	Vault
Gold medal – first place	2002 Tuscaloosa	Floor Exercise
Gold medal – first place	2003 Lincoln	Uneven Bars
Gold medal – first place	2003 Lincoln	Team
Gold medal – first place	2004 Los Angeles	Team
Silver medal – second place	2001 Athens	Floor Exercise
Silver medal – second place	2003 Lincoln	Floor Exercise
Silver medal – second place	2003 Lincoln	Vault
Bronze medal – third place	2002 Tuscaloosa	Team

Jamie Annette Dantzscher (born May 2, 1982) is an American former artistic gymnast. She was a member of the bronze medal-winning American team at the 2000 Olympics in Sydney.

== Early life ==
Dantzscher was born in Canoga Park, California and raised in San Dimas, California. She graduated from San Dimas High School. She trained at Charter Oak Gliders in Covina under Beth Kline-Rybacki and Steve Rybacki.

== Elite gymnastics career ==
Dantzscher was a member of the United States national gymnastics team for eight years, starting in 1994. In her international debut, the 1996 City of Popes competition in France, she won the all-around and floor exercise titles.

She competed in her first senior U.S. Nationals in 1997, finishing sixth in the all-around. Her placement would have qualified her to the U.S. squad for the 1997 World Artistic Gymnastics Championships, but at 15, she was too young to meet the International Federation of Gymnastics' newly raised minimum age requirement. She went on to compete at the 1999 World Artistic Gymnastics Championships in Tianjin, where she placed fifth with the American team.

In 2000, Dantzscher won her first national all-around medal, a bronze. She placed fifth at the Olympic Trials, securing a berth on the U.S. team for the 2000 Summer Olympics in Sydney.

=== 2000 Olympics ===
Dantzscher fell on the floor exercise during the team preliminaries in Sydney but competed well in the team finals, scoring 9.429 on vault, 9.700 on the uneven bars and 9.712 on floor. The U.S. team initially finished fourth, behind Romania, Russia, and China.

Dantzscher was one of the most visible members of the U.S. Olympic team in the media because of her outspoken opposition to the policies of the national team coordinator, Béla Károlyi, whom she called a "puppeteer". Her opinions about Károlyi, which were echoed by some of her teammates and their coaches, were published in many major news outlets during the Olympics.

On April 28, 2010, Dantzscher and the other women on the 2000 Olympic team were awarded the bronze medal in the team competition when it was discovered that the Chinese team had falsified the age of one of its gymnasts, Dong Fangxiao. Dong's results were nullified, and the International Olympic Committee stripped the Chinese team of its medal.

== NCAA career ==
After the Olympics, Dantzscher joined the UCLA Bruins gymnastics team. During her NCAA career, she achieved a UCLA record 28 perfect ten scores. In her first meet as a Bruin, she scored perfect tens on both of the events she competed, floor and bars, making her the first UCLA gymnast to score a perfect ten on her debut collegiate routine. In her four years of NCAA competition, Dantzscher achieved All-American honors 15 times, earned three Pac-10 individual titles, and was a part of three NCAA Championship-winning Bruins teams. She received the 2004 AAI Award.

Dantzscher was inducted into the UCLA Athletics Hall of Fame in 2016.

=== Career Perfect 10.0 ===
Season	Date	Event	Meet
2001	January 5, 2001	Uneven Bars	Maui Invitational
2001	January 5, 2001	Floor Exercise	Maui Invitational
2001	January 19, 2001	Floor Exercise	UCLA @ Stanford
2001	February 11, 2001	Uneven Bars	UCLA vs. Arizona, Washington, and CSUF
2001	February 16, 2001	Floor Exercise	UCLA @ Oregon State
2001	March 4, 2001	Floor Exercise	UCLA vs. Cal, Utah State, and UCSB
2001	March 24, 2001	Floor Exercise	Pac-10 Championship
2002	January 13, 2002	Vault	UCLA @ Georgia
2002	January 18, 2002	Floor Exercise	UCLA vs. Boise State @ CSUF
2002	January 20, 2002	Floor Exercise	UCLA vs. Arizona State
2002	January 25, 2002	Floor Exercise	UCLA @ Arizona
2002	February 10, 2002	Floor Exercise	UCLA vs. Stanford
2002	February 17, 2002	Floor Exercise	UCLA vs. UCSB and UC Davis @ California
2002	February 23, 2002	Floor Exercise	UCLA vs. Oregon State
2002	March 3, 2002	Vault	UCLA vs. Michigan, Minnesota, and CSUF
2002	March 3, 2002	Uneven Bars	UCLA vs. Michigan, Minnesota, and CSUF
2002	March 3, 2002	Floor Exercise	UCLA vs. Michigan, Minnesota, and CSUF
2003	January 2, 2003	Floor Exercise	UCLA vs. Oregon State
2003	January 19, 2003	Uneven Bars	UCLA vs Cal, UC Davis, and CSUF
2003	January 19, 2003	Floor Exercise	UCLA vs Cal, UC Davis, and CSUF
2003	February 7, 2003	Uneven Bars	UCLA @ Stanford
2003	February 9, 2003	Vault	UCLA vs. Washington
2003	February 9, 2003	Floor Exercise	UCLA vs. Washington
2003	February 16, 2003	Vault	UCLA @ Arizona State
2003	February 16, 2003	Uneven Bars	UCLA @ Arizona State
2003	February 23, 2003	Floor Exercise	UCLA vs. Arizona
2003	April 12, 2003	Floor Exercise	Missouri Regional
2004	February 22, 2004	Uneven Bars	UCLA vs. Oregon State

== Post-gymnastics career ==
During the 2008–09 season, Dantzscher was an assistant coach for Arizona State. Before that, she coached at three gyms in California: Diamond Elite Gymnastics in Chino, Club Champion in Pasadena, and East Bay Sports Academy in Concord.

On March 29, 2017, Dantzscher was one of several former gymnasts who testified before Congress about the sexual abuse committed by USA Gymnastics' national team doctor, Larry Nassar. She indicated she had been abused "all over the world", and that she thought she was the only one.

== Personal life ==
Dantzscher's parents and her six siblings all have first names beginning with the letter J. Two of her younger sisters, twins Janelle and Jalynne, also competed on the UCLA gymnastics team. Jalynne competed with the Bruins for one season before retiring from gymnastics because of a recurring injury. Dantzscher's oldest sister, Jennifer Pippin, died in April 2017 of asthma-related causes.

Dantzscher is a Latter-day Saint. She is the sister-in-law of Brandon Crawford, the San Francisco Giants shortstop, who is married to Jalynne Dantzscher.

In February 2017, three former gymnasts, Dantzscher, Jeanette Antolin and Jessica Howard, gave an interview with 60 Minutes in which they accused Larry Nassar of sexually abusing them. The gymnasts also alleged that the "emotionally abusive environment" at the national team training camps run by Béla and Márta Károlyi at the Karolyi Ranch gave Nassar an opportunity to take advantage of the gymnasts by grooming them and made them afraid to speak up about the abuse.
