= Nebraska Cornhuskers women's gymnastics =

University of Nebraska–Lincoln women's gymnastics team

- Founded: 1975; 51 years ago
- University: University of Nebraska–Lincoln
- Athletic director: Troy Dannen
- Head coach: Nicole Jones (1st season)
- Conference: Big Ten
- Location: Lincoln, Nebraska
- Home arena: Bob Devaney Sports Center (Capacity: 8,309)
- Nickname: Cornhuskers
- Colors: Scarlet and cream

Super Six appearances
- 1997, 1999, 2000, 2001, 2002, 2003, 2005, 2006, 2007, 2011, 2014, 2018

NCAA Regional championships
- 1982, 2000, 2001, 2002, 2003

NCAA Tournament appearances
- 1982, 1983, 1987, 1988, 1989, 1990, 1995, 1996, 1997, 1999, 2000, 2001, 2002, 2003, 2004, 2005, 2006, 2007, 2010, 2011, 2012, 2014, 2015, 2016, 2017, 2018, 2019, 2023, 2024, 2025, 2026

Conference championships
- 1978, 1979, 1980, 1982, 1983, 1987, 1988, 1989, 1990, 1994, 1995, 1996, 1997, 1998, 1999, 2001, 2002, 2003, 2005, 2007, 2011, 2012, 2013, 2014, 2017

The Nebraska Cornhuskers women's gymnastics team competes as part of NCAA Division I, representing the University of Nebraska–Lincoln in the Big Ten Conference. Nebraska has hosted meets at the Bob Devaney Sports Center since 1976.

Since being established in 1975, the program has won twenty-five conference championships and qualified for the NCAA tournament twenty-nine times. Most of the program's success came under head coach Dan Kendig, who led NU for twenty-five years and made twelve Super Six appearances. Michelle Bryant, Heather Brink, and Richelle Simpson combined to win five individual NCAA championships and are among eighty-three Cornhuskers All-Americans. The team has been coached by Nicole Jones since 2026.

== History ==
Nebraska established a women's gymnastics program in 1975 and hired Karen Balke to lead a team of entirely freshmen and sophomores. Judy Schalk took over the following season, leading the Cornhuskers to five conference titles and an AIAW tournament bid in six seasons as head coach. Schalk resigned in 1983 and Nebraska hired Georgia head coach Rick Walton. Walton's program captured four consecutive Big Eight championships from 1987 to 1990, beginning a stretch of fifteen conference titles in twenty-one seasons. Michele Bryant became NU's first NCAA champion with a record-setting vault performance in Corvallis in 1990.

After a pair of disappointing seasons, Walton was pressured to resign by athletic director Bill Byrne and men's coach Francis Allen. On Allen's recommendation, Byrne hired Dan Kendig, a former Schalk assistant who nearly got the job over Walton ten years prior. Nebraska's Big Eight (and later Big 12) dominance continued under Kendig. The Cornhuskers reached the new "Super Six" finals for the first time in 1997, beating top-ranked Utah to claim the final spot. Heather Brink and Richelle Simpson each won two our NCAA championships in the early 2000s; Simpson was the first NU gymnast to become a first-team All-American in all four events in the same year. Kendig and Nebraska made eleven more Super Six appearances during his twenty-five-year tenure as head coach, but never finished higher than fourth nationally.

Kendig abruptly retired months prior to the 2019 season. It was later revealed he had provided over $30,000 in impermissible benefits to a volunteer assistant through a fictitious company. Nebraska self-reported the violation and received Level II sanctions. Longtime assistant Heather Brink succeeded Kendig as head coach.

Brink's contract was not renewed following the 2026 postseason and Michigan State head coach Nicole Jones was named her replacement.

== Conference affiliations ==
- Big Eight Conference (1975–1996)
- Big 12 Conference (1997–2011)
- Big Ten Conference (2012–present)

== Coaches ==
=== Coaching history ===
| No. | Coach | Tenure | Overall |
|---|---|---|---|
| 1 | Karen Balke | 1975–1976 | 11–21 (.344) |
| 2 | Judy Schalk | 1976–1983 | 171–122–3 (.583) |
| 3 | Rick Walton | 1983–1993 | 173–121 (.588) |
| 4 | Dan Kendig | 1994–2018 | 599–229–4 (.722) |
| 5 | Heather Brink | 2019–2026 | 65–82 (.442) |
| 6 | Nicole Jones | 2026–present | 0–0 |

=== Coaching staff ===
| Name | Position | First year | Alma mater |
|---|---|---|---|
| Nicole Jones | Head coach | 2026 | Michigan State |
| Devin Wright | Associate head coach | 2026 | Chamberlain |
| Jordan Gamboa | Assistant coach | 2026 | Oklahoma |
| Brett Wargo | Assistant coach | 2026 | James Madison |

== Venues ==
Nebraska played its first season at the NU Coliseum before moving to the NU Sports Complex (now the Bob Devaney Sports Center) upon its completion in 1976. When Nebraska's basketball programs moved to the newly constructed West Haymarket Arena (known as Pinnacle Bank Arena for sponsorship purposes) in 2013, the Devaney Center underwent a $20-million remodel to reconfigure and shrink its main arena.

Nebraska opened the Francis Allen Training Complex in 2020 to house its men's and women's gymnastics programs; at 46,000 square feet it is among the largest gymnastics practice facilities in the country.

== Championships and awards ==
=== Super Six appearances ===
- 1997, 1999, 2000, 2001, 2002, 2003, 2005, 2006, 2007, 2011, 2014, 2018

=== Team conference championships ===
Tournament

- Big Eight: 1978, 1979, 1980, 1982, 1983, 1987, 1988, 1989, 1990, 1994, 1995, 1996
- Big 12: 1997, 1998, 1999, 2001, 2002, 2003, 2005, 2007, 2011
- Big Ten: 2012, 2013

Regular season (Note: The Big Eight and Big 12 did not award a regular-season championship.)

- Big Ten: 2014, 2017

=== Individual awards ===
- Honda Sports Award: Heather Brink (2000)
- National coach of the year: Dan Kendig (1997)
- Conference gymnast of the year: Heather Brink (2000), Alecia Ingram (2001), Richelle Simpson (2003), Emily Parsons (2007), Kylie Stone (2009), Emily Wong (2014)
- Conference coach of the year: Rick Walton (1987, 1989), Dan Kendig (1994–1998, 2000, 2003, 2007, 2009, 2011, 2012)
- Conference freshman / newcomer of the year: Kim DeHaan (1994), Misty Oxford (1996), Heather Brink (1997), Bree Dority-O'Callaghan (1999), A. J. Lamb (2000), Alecia Ingram (2001), Emily Parsons (2005), Lora Evenstad (2009), Jessie DeZiel (2012), Taylor Houchin (2017)

=== NCAA champions ===
- Michele Bryant – 1990 (V)
- Heather Brink – 2000 (AA, V)
- Richelle Simpson – 2003 (AA, FX)

=== First-team NCAA All-Americans ===
- Patty Carmichael-Gerard – 1979 (AA, FX)
- Renee Reisdorff – 1979 (BB)
- Tami Bair – 1989 (BB, V)
- Michele Bryant – 1989 (UB, V), 1990 (UB, V)
- Crystal Savage – 1989 (UB)
- Shelly Bartlett – 1997 (UB)
- Heather Brink – 1997 (V), 1999 (AA, FX, V), 2000 (AA, FX, UB, V)
- Misty Oxford – 1997 (FX, V)
- A. J. Lamb – 2000 (FX), 2002 (UB, V), 2003 (AA, BB, FX)
- Gina Bruce – 2001 (V), 2003 (V)
- Tami Harris – 2001 (UB)
- Alecia Ingram – 2001 (AA, UB)
- Julie Houk – 2002 (UB), 2003 (UB)
- Jess Wertz – 2002 (V)
- Richelle Simpson – 2003 (AA, BB, FX, UB, V)
- Kristi Esposito – 2004 (AA, BB), 2005 (BB)
- Libby Landgraf – 2004 (UB)
- Emily Parsons – 2005 (FX), 2006 (AA, FX, V), 2007 (FX, V), 2008 (BB)
- Vanessa Meloche – 2006 (UB)
- Tricia Woo – 2006 (FX), 2007 (BB)
- Michelle Zabawa – 2007 (V)
- Desire Sniatynski – 2008 (UB)
- Lora Evenstad – 2010 (V), 2011 (FX)
- Brittany Skinner – 2010 (V)
- Erin Davis – 2011 (FX, V)
- Janelle Giblin – 2011 (V), 2012 (V)
- Maria Scaffidi – 2011 (UB)
- Jamie Schleppenbach – 2011 (V), 2014 (BB)
- Emily Wong – 2011 (UB), 2012 (BB), 2013 (AA, FX, V), 2014 (BB, FX)
- Jessie DeZiel – 2012 (AA, FX), 2014 (BB), 2015 (AA)
- Hollie Blanske – 2014 (BB), 2015 (FX), 2016 (V)
- Sienna Crouse – 2017 (V), 2018 (FX)
- Taylor Houchin – 2018 (V)

=== First-team WGCA All-Americans ===
- Jesse DeZiel – 2013 (AA, V)
- Emily Wong – 2013 (AA, BB, FX, UB), 2014 (AA, FX)
- Sienna Crouse – 2018 (V)
- Megan Schweihofer – 2018 (FX)
- Taylor Houchin – 2020 (V)

== Seasons ==
| Regular season champion | Tournament champion |

| Year | Coach | Overall | Conference tournament | Postseason (Note: The AIAW ran the premier women's collegiate gymnastics championship until the first NCAA tournament was held in 1982.) |
|---|---|---|---|---|
Big Eight Conference (1976–1996)
| 1975–76 | Karen Balke | 11–21 | 5th | AIAW regional |
| 1976–77 | Judy Schalk | 18–7 | 2nd | AIAW regional |
| 1977–78 | Judy Schalk | 28–10 | 1st | AIAW regional |
| 1978–79 | Judy Schalk | 29–21–3 | 1st | AIAW T–11th |
| 1979–80 | Judy Schalk | 32–23 | 1st | AIAW 16th |
| 1981 | Judy Schalk | 13–22 | 3rd | AIAW regional |
| 1981–82 | Judy Schalk | 27–14 | 1st | NCAA 8th |
| 1982–83 | Judy Schalk | 24–25 | 1st | NCAA 10th |
| 1983–84 | Rick Walton | 19–10 | | |
| 1985 | Rick Walton | 14–10 | 2nd | NCAA regional |
| 1986 | Rick Walton | 14–14 | 3rd | NCAA regional |
| 1987 | Rick Walton | 18–20 | 1st | NCAA 10th |
| 1988 | Rick Walton | 18–19 | 1st | NCAA 10th |
| 1989 | Rick Walton | 26–7 | 1st | NCAA 4th |
| 1990 | Rick Walton | 30–6 | 1st | NCAA 5th |
| 1991 | Rick Walton | 10–11 | 2nd | NCAA regional |
| 1992 | Rick Walton | 12–11 | 2nd | NCAA regional |
| 1993 | Rick Walton | 12–13 | 2nd | NCAA regional |
| 1994 | Dan Kendig | 17–8 | 1st | NCAA regional |
| 1995 | Dan Kendig | 25–9 | 1st | NCAA 11th |
| 1996 | Dan Kendig | 25–8 | 1st | NCAA 10th |
Big 12 Conference (1997–2011)
| 1997 | Dan Kendig | 28–11–1 | 1st | NCAA 6th |
| 1998 | Dan Kendig | 16–8 | 1st | NCAA regional |
| 1999 | Dan Kendig | 26–10 | 1st | NCAA 6th |
| 2000 | Dan Kendig | 36–9 | 2nd | NCAA 4th |
| 2001 | Dan Kendig | 26–7–1 | 1st | NCAA T–5th |
| 2002 | Dan Kendig | 23–8 | 1st | NCAA 5th |
| 2003 | Dan Kendig | 32–4 | 1st | NCAA 4th |
| 2004 | Dan Kendig | 15–9–1 | 4th | NCAA 10th |
| 2005 | Dan Kendig | 21–13 | 1st | NCAA 6th |
| 2006 | Dan Kendig | 26–11–1 | 2nd | NCAA 5th |
| 2007 | Dan Kendig | 26–12 | 1st | NCAA 6th |
| 2008 | Dan Kendig | 13–9 | 4th | NCAA regional |
| 2009 | Dan Kendig | 16–7 | 2nd | NCAA regional |
| 2010 | Dan Kendig | 23–8 | 2nd | NCAA 7th |
| 2011 | Dan Kendig | 22–12 | 1st | NCAA 4th |
Big Ten Conference (2012–present)
| 2012 | Dan Kendig | 24–7 | 1st | NCAA 8th |
| 2013 | Dan Kendig | 19–5 | 1st | NCAA regional |
| 2014 | Dan Kendig | 27–11 | 2nd | NCAA 6th |
| 2015 | Dan Kendig | 28–9 | 3rd | NCAA 8th |
| 2016 | Dan Kendig | 28–9 | 2nd | NCAA 8th |
| 2017 | Dan Kendig | 29–10 | 4th | NCAA 7th |
| 2018 | Dan Kendig | 28–15 | 2nd | NCAA 6th |
| 2019 | Heather Brink | 12–5 | 4th | NCAA super regional |
| 2020 | Heather Brink | 8–4 | Canceled (Note: Canceled due to the COVID-19 pandemic.) | |
| 2021 | Heather Brink | 1–20 | 9th | |
| 2022 | Heather Brink | 6–10 | 6th | |
| 2023 | Heather Brink | 12–13 | 6th | NCAA regional |
| 2024 | Heather Brink | 15–13 | 7th | NCAA regional |
| 2025 | Heather Brink | 8–14 | 9th | NCAA regional |
| 2026 | Heather Brink | 8–14 | 12th | NCAA regional |

== Olympians ==
| Olympiad | City | Gymnast (Note: Emma Spence served as an alternate for Canada in 2020 and 2024.) | Country | Medal(s) |
|---|---|---|---|---|
| 2004 (XXVIII) | (Greece) Athens | Kylie Stone | Canada | |
| 2024 (XXXIII) | (France) Paris | Csenge Bácskay | Hungary | |
