= Tom Farden =

American college gymnastics coach

Biographical details
- Born: 28 March 1974 (age 52); Incheon, South Korea
- Education: Southeast Missouri State University

Coaching career (HC unless noted)
- 2003–2009: SE Missouri
- 2010–2015: Utah (Assistant Coach)
- 2015–2019: Utah (Co-Head Coach)
- 2019–2023: Utah

Accomplishments and honors

Awards
- NCAA Region Coach of the Year (2008, 2020 & 2022) Conference Coach of the Year 2006, '07, '08 & '09 Pac-12 Coach of the Year 2020

Thomas Farden (born Man-Ki Park; March 28, 1974) is a South Korea-born American college gymnastics coach. He began his career as the assistant coach of his alma mater the Southeast Missouri Redhawks women's program in 1999, and was promoted to head coach in 2003. After his departure in 2009, Farden briefly served as an assistant coach for the Arkansas Razorbacks for the 2010 season. In 2011, Farden became an assistant coach for the Utah Red Rocks team; a position he held until 2015 when, following the retirement of long-time leader Greg Marsden, he was made the co-head coach with Megan Marsden. After Marsden's retirement in 2019, Farden became the sole head coach of the program. In November 2023, the school put him on administrative leave.

== Life and career ==
=== 1980–99: beginnings ===
At the age of six, in 1980, Farden commenced gymnastics training – he participated as a competitor from the ages of 6 to 18, insisting he was never a good gymnast. In 1992, following graduation from Anoka High School, Farden started Spectrum Gymnastics in Anoka, Minnesota with Bill Corcoran and Bart Roskoski. The gym closed in 1996; he then started coaching at TAGS Gymnastics in Eden Prairie, Minnesota.

=== 1999–2010: Coaching at Southeast Missouri and Arkansas ===
In 1999, SEMO women's gymnastics head coach Patty Stotzheim asked Farden whether he'd want to work as her assistant; he took the job for a salary of $15,000. With the Redhawks program, he was a four-year assistant coach until, in May 2003, Farden was named the head coach of the Redhawks after Stotzheim left to attend law school. In his first season, the Redhawks finished fourth at the MIC Championships. In addition, Tara Boldt and Katie Bloom advanced to the NCAA Regionals in Lincoln, Nebraska and the team finished ranked 46th.

Farden's Redhawks finished third at the 2006 MIC Championships and, unlike the previous season, garnered a team NCAA Regional birth, finishing the year at #35. The 2007 season didn't see the Redhawks earn a Regional birth either, despite the team's third-place finish at MIC Championships in Cape Girardeau, Missouri. The 2008 season, Farden's penultimate at SEMO, the team finished second at the MIC Championships, and the team finished 5th at the South Central Regional (ahead of PAC 10 team ASU) and 30th nationally. As a result, Farden was awarded NCAA Region Coach of the Year.

Farden's final season in 2009 the program won the MIC Conference Championships and, consequently, the team did not qualify to regionals, finishing the year ranked 37th. From 2006 to 2009, Farden was awarded MIC Conference Coach of the Year. He left to join the Arkansas Razorbacks program as an assistant coach.

=== 2011–2023: Utah ===
==== 2011–15: Assistant coach ====
Farden joined the Utah Red Rocks program as an assistant coach for the 2011 season. He was hired as a replacement for Jeff Graba, who took the head coach role for the Auburn Tigers women's gymnastics program.

Farden headed as Utah's bars head coach; his work was highlighted through the second-place finish of Georgia Dabritz at the 2013 Nationals, and her latter National title in 2015. Additionally, in his first season, the program's national bars ranking shot from #12 to #3. Likewise, in 2015, Utah were co-leaders in the nation for the uneven bars, tied with Florida Gators.

==== 2016–2019: Co-head coach ====
Upon the retirement of Greg Marsden, the long-time head coach of the Red Rocks, Farden was appointed the co-Head Coach of the program along with Megan Marsden, long-time assistant coach and the spouse of Greg Marsden. In his first season, the Red Rocks finished fifth in the all-around during the regular season; they then had a second-place finish at the 2016 Pac-12 Championships, in Seattle, Washington. However, the Red Rocks won the 2016 Regional to qualify to the 2016 NCAA Women's Gymnastics Championship in Fort Worth, Texas.

==== 2019-2023: Head Coach ====
Upon Megan Marsden's retirement, Farden became the sole head coach of the Utah program. In the 2020 season, he led the program to its second undefeated season (1993 & 2020) and the first-ever Pac-12 regular season title. For these accomplishments, he was named Pac-12 Coach and Regional Coach of the Year.

During Farden’s tenure, the Red Rocks won every Pac-12 regular season title (outright in 2020 and 2021, and shared in 2022 and 2023) and every Pac-12 Conference Championship (2021-2023). In the postseason, Utah won three regional titles and three third-place finishes at the NCAA National Championship (2021-2023).

==== Administrative leave ====
In October 2023, Tokyo Olympic alternate gymnast Kara Eaker said she had been subjected to abusive coaching by Farden while at Utah, and was withdrawing from the school and retiring. Kim Tessen, who competed for Utah from 2017–20 and was a second-team All-American on vault and uneven bars as a senior, said that she suffered from "major depression, anxiety and suicidal ideation" during her time with the team, and that Farden verbally attacked her and made her feel physically unsafe. In November 2023, the school put him on administrative leave. They mutually agreed to separate soon after.

=== 2024-present: Twin City Twisters ===
In July 2024, he began coaching at Twin City Twisters, an elite gymnastics training facility, where he is the girls team director. The move caused controversy due to the allegations of abuse at Utah.

== Personal life ==
Born Man-Ki Park on March 28, 1974, Farden was adopted from South Korea (born in Incheon), as he was an orphan – stating that he was 'left in a basket on the sidewalk'.

He is married to Christina Farden (née Faulkner), an alumna of Southeast Missouri State University. He and his wife have adopted a son from South Korea (the same region as Farden too) named Ki.
