= Elise Ray =

American artistic gymnast

- Born: February 6, 1982 (age 44) Tallahassee, Florida, U.S.

Gymnastics career
- Discipline: Women's artistic gymnastics
- Country represented: United States (1996–2001 (USA))
- College team: Michigan Wolverines
- Club: Hill's Angels
- Former coach: Kelli Hill
- Choreographer: Dominic Zito
- Retired: April 24, 2005
Medal record
Women's gymnastics
Representing the United States
Olympic Games
| Bronze medal – third place | 2000 Sydney | Team |
Goodwill Games
| Silver medal – second place | 1998 New York | Uneven Bars |
Representing Michigan Wolverines
NCAA Championships
| Gold medal – first place | 2001 Athens | All Around |
| Gold medal – first place | 2002 Tuscaloosa | Balance Beam |
| Gold medal – first place | 2004 Los Angeles | Uneven Bars |
| Silver medal – second place | 2005 Los Angeles | Balance Beam |
| Bronze medal – third place | 2001 Athens | Team |
| Bronze medal – third place | 2001 Athens | Uneven Bars |
| Bronze medal – third place | 2004 Los Angeles | Balance Beam |

Mary Elise Ray (born February 6, 1982) is an American gymnast who represented the United States at the 2000 Olympics in Sydney and the 1999 World Championships. She was the head gymnastics coach at the University of Washington from 2016 to 2020.

== Biography and early career ==
Ray attended Steven's Forest Elementary School and Wilde Lake High School in Columbia, Maryland and went on to train at Hill's Angels club in Maryland under Kelli Hill, coach of Olympic medalists Dominique Dawes and Courtney Kupets. She earned her first US national team berth as a junior in 1996 and turned in a strong performance in her international debut, the 1996 Junior Pan American Championships, placing second in the all-around and winning gold on the uneven bars and floor exercise. She continued to excel in the years that followed, picking up an uneven bars silver medal at the 1998 Goodwill Games. At the 1999 World Championships in Tianjin, China, Ray was the highest-ranked American of the competition, finishing eighth in the all-around.

== Sydney Olympics and vault controversy ==
Ray won both the US National Championships and the Olympic Trials in 2000. At the Sydney Olympics, Ray was the only American woman to qualify for an event final, balance beam. In spite of this, she would encounter major difficulties at the Olympics. In the all-around finals, officials mistakenly set the vault apparatus 5 cm too low; the situation was not remedied until the competition was halfway over. The change completely altered gymnasts' entry and postflight and caused several crashes. Ray was one of the gymnasts who vaulted before the error was discovered; she fell on both her warmup and competition vaults. On one of her warm up vaults, she came inches away from crashing on her head. Although Ray escaped injury, the experience left her shaken, and she also fell from beam. It is impossible to tell how much her subsequent performances were affected. Gymnasts who had vaulted on the incorrectly set apparatus were invited to redo their vaults at the end of the session; Ray accepted this offer and ended up in 13th place with her revised score. Like most gymnasts who had used the incorrectly set vault, Ray felt that it had a negative effect on her performance: she opined during a post competition interview with NBC that she could have medalled had it not happened. She also placed eighth in the beam final, bringing an end to a very disappointing Olympics for USA Gymnastics.

== Post-Olympics ==
After Sydney, Elise attended the University of Michigan on a full athletic scholarship, where she majored in English. She crowned a very successful NCAA career by leading her team to the Super Six finals in 2005, and winning a silver on beam. Previously, she tied (with Onnie Willis of UCLA) for the all-around title in 2001 and won golds in the balance beam (2002) and uneven bars (2004) events. She performed for three years in Cirque du Soleil, where she was a member of the Cadre team in the Las Vegas resident show O. She also performed in the Cirque Show, Love. Ray also serves occasionally as a color commentator for Big Ten Network broadcasts of women's gymnastics. She coached at Carroll Gymnastics Center in Hampstead, Maryland, afterward.

On April 28, 2010, Elise and the other women on the 2000 Olympic team were awarded the bronze medal in the team competition when it was discovered that the previous medal winners, the Chinese team, had falsified the age of team member Dong Fangxiao. As a result of the falsification, Dong's results were nullified, and the Chinese team was stripped of the medal by the IOC.

The U.S. team was given their bronze medals at a special ceremony prior to the men's competition at the U.S. Championships in August 2010.

On September 22, 2011, Elise joined the Washington Huskies gymnastics program as an assistant coach, replacing her former Michigan teammate Shanna Hannan and reuniting with head coach Joanne Bowers, who was an assistant coach at Michigan.

On May 27, 2016, Ray was named the new head coach of the Huskies program following the resignation of previous coach Joanne Bowers; she had been with the University of Washington for five years. Ray resigned her coaching position in October 2020, as she and her family moved away from the Seattle area.

== Eponymous skills ==
Ray has two eponymous uneven bars skills listed in the Code of Points and another that is not official in the Code of Points due to its low difficulty value.

| Apparatus | Name | Description | Difficulty (Note: Valid for the 2025–2028 Code of Points) |
|---|---|---|---|
| Uneven bars | Ray | Backward stalder facing inward with release and straddled counter movement forward in flight to hang on high bar | B (0.2) |
| Uneven bars | Ray II | Piked sole circle (toe-on) into a Tkachev | D (0.4) |
| Uneven bars | Ray III | Double-twisting double layout dismount | G (0.7) |

== Additional achievements ==
Elise Ray graduated from the University of Michigan with the most All-America honors (14) in the program's history.

Elise Ray is the Big Ten Conference's all-time leader in Gymnast of the Week citations, earning nine in her career.
