= 2002 NCAA women's gymnastics championships =

American college gymnastics competition

- Venue: Coleman Coliseum
- Location: Tuscaloosa, Alabama
- Dates: April 18–20, 2002
- Teams: 12

Champions
- Women: Jamie Dantzscher, UCLA (39.675)
- Team: Alabama (4th)

The 2002 NCAA women's gymnastics championships were contested at the 21st annual tournament hosted by the NCAA to determine the individual and team national champions of women's gymnastics among its member programs in the United States.

The competition took place from April 18–20 in Tuscaloosa, Alabama, hosted by the University of Alabama in Coleman Coliseum.

Alabama won the team national championship, the Crimson Tide's fourth NCAA national title and first since 1996.

Jamie Dantzscher, from UCLA, won the individual all-around championship with a score of 39.675.

== Champions ==
Event	Gold	Silver	Bronze
Team	Alabama Crimson Tide; Natalie Barrington; Alexis Brion; Helen Burgin; Tiffany Byrd; Erin Holdefer; Lauren Holdefer; Shannon Hrozek; Stephanie Kite; Alexa Martinez; Whitney Morgan; Andreé Pickens; Michelle Reeser; Jeana Rice; Sara Scarborough; Kristin Sterner; Raegan Tomasek	Georgia Gym Dogs; Melinda Baimbridge; Cassie Bair; Chelsa Byrd; Eileen Diaz; Michelle Emmons; Cory Fritzinger; Kinsey Rowe; Breanne Rutherford; Sierra Sapunar; Loren Simpson; Marline Stephens; Megan Tolbert; Talya Vexler	UCLA Bruins; Jeanette Antolin; Alyssa Beckerman; Michelle Conway; Jamie Dantzscher; Natasha Desai; Lindsey Dong; Christy Erickson; Malia Jones; Kristen Maloney; Kristin Parker; Trishna Patel; Carly Raab; Christie Tedmon; Doni Thompson; Yvonne Tousek; Valerie Velasco; Jamie Williams; Onnie Willis
All-Around	Jamie Dantzscher (UCLA)	Andreé Pickens (Alabama)	Theresa Kulikowski (Utah)
Vault	Jamie Dantzscher (UCLA)	Marline Stephens (Georgia)	Andreé Pickens (Alabama)
Uneven Bars	Andreé Pickens (Alabama)	Doni Thompson (UCLA)	Onnie Willis (UCLA)
Balance Beam	Elise Ray (Michigan)	Jeana Rice (Alabama)	Kristin Sterner (Alabama); Theresa Kulikowski (Utah)
Floor Exercise	Jamie Dantzscher (UCLA); Nicki Arnstad (LSU)	Shannon Bowles (Utah)	Alexis Brion (Alabama); Talya Vexler (Georgia)

== Team results ==
=== Session 1 ===
Position	Team	Vault (gymnastics)	Uneven bars	Balance beam	Floor (gymnastics)	Total
1	Utah	49.100	48.950	49.450	49.275	196.775
2	Georgia	49.200	49.000	49.300	49.150	196.650
3	Nebraska	49.300	49.150	49.050	49.075	196.575
4	Michigan	49.225	48.500	49.200	49.250	196.175
5	LSU	48.925	48.750	48.800	49.375	195.850
6	Arizona	48.825	48.700	48.475	48.975	194.975

=== Session 2 ===
Position	Team	Vault (gymnastics)	Uneven bars	Balance beam	Floor (gymnastics)	Total
1	Alabama	49.275	49.025	49.550	49.450	197.300
2	UCLA	49.225	49.275	49.250	49.350	197.100
3	Stanford	49.200	48.650	49.175	49.025	196.050
4	Minnesota	48.675	48.575	49.125	49.350	195.700
5	Florida	49.025	48.925	48.650	49.075	195.675
6	Oregon State	47.400	48.925	48.200	48.400	192.925

=== Super Six ===
Position	Team	Vault (gymnastics)	Uneven bars	Balance beam	Floor (gymnastics)	Total
1	Alabama	49.325	49.450	49.375	49.425	197.575
2	Georgia	49.250	49.325	49.375	49.300	197.250
3	UCLA	49.325	49.375	49.150	49.300	197.150
4	Utah	49.175	49.300	49.350	49.125	196.950
5	Nebraska	49.075	49.425	48.750	49.175	196.425
6	Stanford	49.075	48.925	49.000	49.025	196.025

== See also ==
- 2002 NCAA men's gymnastics championships
