= Maples Pavilion =

Arena at Stanford University, California, United States

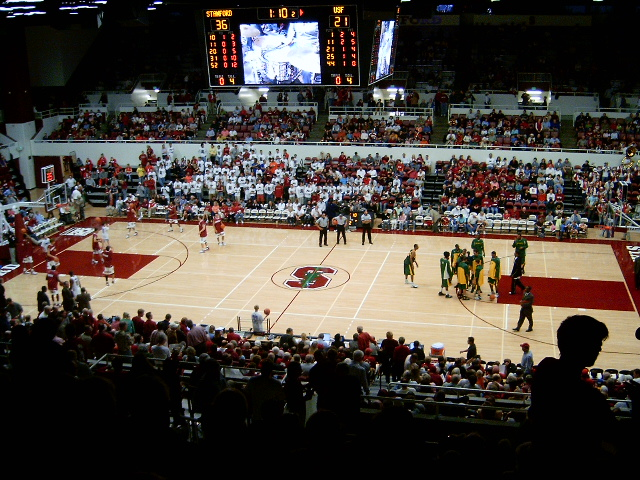
- Hosting the USF Dons in November 2005

- Location in California Location in the United States
- Full name: Roscoe Maples Pavilion
- Location: 655 Campus Drive; Stanford, California
- Coordinates: 37.4296°N 122.1605°W
- Owner: Stanford University
- Operator: Stanford University
- Capacity: Basketball: 7,233

Construction
- Groundbreaking: 1967
- Opened: January 3, 1969; 57 years ago
- Renovated: March 2004
- Cost: $3.24 Million ($28.4 million in 2025 dollars)
- Architect: John Carl Warnecke

Tenant
- Stanford Cardinal (1969–present)

Maples Pavilion is a 7,233-seat multi-purpose arena on the campus of Stanford University in Stanford, California. Opened in 1969, Maples underwent a $30 million renovation in March 2004 and reopened ahead of schedule, in time for conference play that December. It was named after its principal donor, Roscoe Maples.

== History ==
Roscoe Maples was an Oregon lumber magnate. Upon his death in 1963, Maples bequeathed most of his $2 million estate to the university. A member of the class of 1904, he left school before graduating to support his parents, and later went on to success in the lumber business. Prior to 1969, Stanford played at the Old Pavilion, opened in 1922.

Maples is home to multiple Stanford Cardinal athletics teams, including men's and women's basketball, men's and women's gymnastics, men's and women's volleyball. The raucous student section that roots for the men's basketball team is called the "6th Man" and is located in several rows courtside.

Prior to the renovation, the original floor at Maples had a flexible surface. Designed by Stanford graduate John Carl Warnecke (1919–2010), it was installed when the Pavilion opened in 1969. Nine inches (23 cm) of crosshatched wood and air was supposed to create a coil-spring effect preventing injuries, but often had the opposite effect. It caused a "Missed Stair Effect", a phenomenon that occurs when the body senses where the floor should be upon landing after a jump. With the tensile feeling of the floor, often the level would be different from when the player jumped, causing a strange sensation throughout the body.

== See also ==
- List of NCAA Division I basketball arenas
