= Tabitha Yim =

American artistic gymnast (born 1985)

- Full name: Tabitha Ann Yim
- Born: November 2, 1985 (age 40) Los Angeles, California, U.S.
- Height: 5 ft 2 in (157 cm)

Gymnastics career
- Discipline: Women's artistic gymnastics
- Country represented: United States; (1998–2005)
- College team: Stanford Cardinal (2005–08)
- Club: Charter Oaks Gliders
- Head coaches: Steve and Beth Rybacki
Medal record
Women's artistic gymnastics
Representing the United States
World Championships
Bronze medal – third place	2001 Ghent	Team
Pan American Championships
Gold medal – first place	2001 Cancún	Team
Gold medal – first place	2001 Cancún	Balance Beam
Bronze medal – third place	2001 Cancún	All-Around

Tabitha Yim
Current position
- Title: Head coach
- Team: Stanford Cardinal
- Conference: ACC

Biographical details
- Education: Stanford University

Coaching career (HC unless noted)
- 2010–2015: Stanford Cardinal (Asst.)
- 2015–2017: Arizona Wildcats
- 2017–present: Stanford Cardinal

Tabitha Ann Yim (born November 2, 1985) is an American former artistic gymnast and current head coach of the Stanford Cardinal women's gymnastics team. She is a 2001 World bronze medalist in the team competition, the 2002 U.S. national balance beam champion, the 2001 U.S. national floor exercise champion, and a two-time U.S. national all-around silver medalist (2001, 2002). Prior to becoming head coach at Stanford Yim was the head coach for the Arizona Wildcats gymnastics team.

== Early years and junior career ==
Yim was born in Los Angeles, California. While competing at the elite level in gymnastics, Yim also trained as a competitive figure skater and reached the novice level.

In 1998, Yim began training at Charter Oak Gliders gymnastics club in Covina, California, and was coached by Beth Kline-Rybacki and Steve Rybacki. She quickly climbed the junior international elite ranks and won the silver medal in the all-around in the junior division at the 1999 U.S. National Championships after having placed 22nd the year before. She also won the silver medal on balance beam and on floor. In 2000, she won the gold medal in the junior all-around at the American Classic as well as the beam and floor titles. She then won the bronze medal in the junior all-around at the 2000 U.S. National Championships and became the junior national champion on floor.

== Senior international career ==
Seen as a junior international elite to watch for her expressive dance and strong balance beam performances, Yim quickly progressed to become one of the top U.S. gymnasts during the 2001-2004 quadrennium. In her first major senior competition, the 2001 U.S. National Championships, she won the silver medal in the all-around behind 2000 Olympic team member, Tasha Schwikert. Her runner-up finish secured her a place on the 2001 World team.

At the 2001 World Championships in Ghent, Belgium, Yim won a bronze medal in the team competition as part of the U.S. team. This was the first World Championship medal for the United States since 1996. Yim also placed 7th in the all-around final as well as 6th in the floor event final. A fall on the beam in the qualification round cost her a position in the balance beam final. 2001 Worlds was Yim's last major international event, as injuries hampered her throughout the rest of her elite career.

Out for most of 2002 with a series of lower body injuries, Yim returned to the 2002 U.S. National Championships after just two weeks of full training. She won the silver medal in the all-around for the second consecutive year behind Tasha Schwikert and was a leading candidate to represent the U.S. at the 2002 World Championships. However, an injury after Nationals sidelined her from the World team, where she could have been a contender in the beam and floor event finals.

In 2003, Yim won the gold medal in the all-around at the American Classic. After another series of injuries, she did not compete at the 2003 U.S. National Championships and missed out on qualifying for the 2003 World team, which went on to win the team gold medal.

Yim returned in time to compete in the 2004 Olympic year. At the 2004 U.S. National Championships, she placed 7th in the all around, which put her within striking distance of the Olympic team. At the 2004 Olympic Trials, she placed a strong 4th all-around and was in a great position to earn an Olympic berth. Two days after Olympic Trials and just prior to the closed door Olympic Selection training camp, Yim sustained a torn Achilles tendon injury that halted her Olympic aspirations.

== College and coaching ==
Yim attended Stanford University and competed for the Stanford women's gymnastics team from 2004-2008. She earned the most All-American honors in Stanford history, 14, and placed in the top 10 at the NCAA championships all four years.

Yim was an assistant coach for the Stanford University women's gymnastics team for five seasons (2011 through 2015) before becoming the head coach of the Arizona women's gymnastics team in May 2015.

Yim was named the head coach of the Stanford University women's gymnastics team in August 2017.
