= 2015 AT&T American Cup =

- Date(s): March 7, 2015
- Venue: AT&T Stadium
- Location: Arlington, Texas, U.S.
- No. of competitors: 18
- Level: FIG World Cup
- Winner(s): (United States) Simone Biles (Ukraine) Oleg Verniaiev
- Preceded by: 2014
- Succeeded by: 2016

The 2015 AT&T American Cup is the 39th edition of the American Cup and the final event in the 2014-15 FIG World Cup series.

== Participants ==
=== Women ===
- (United States) Simone Biles
- (Canada) Elsabeth Black
- (Italy) Erika Fasana
- (Italy) Vanessa Ferrari
- (United Kingdom) Claudia Fragapane
- (Australia) Emily Little
- (Venezuela) Jessica López
- (Japan) Natsumi Sasada
- (United States) Mykayla Skinner

== Results ==
=== Women ===
Rank	Gymnast	Vault (gymnastics)	Uneven bars	Balance beam	Floor (gymnastics)	Total
1st place, gold medalist(s)	Simone Biles (USA)	16.033	15.200	15.066	16.000	62.299
2nd place, silver medalist(s)	Mykayla Skinner (USA)	15.100	14.266	13.533	14.933	57.832
3rd place, bronze medalist(s)	Erika Fasana (ITA)	14.533	13.900	13.800	14.400	56.633
4	Jessica López (VEN)	15.000	14.933	13.166	13.266	56.365
5	Ellie Black (CAN)	14.566	13.000	14.266	14.300	56.132
6	Vanessa Ferrari (ITA)	14.133	13.966	13.866	13.766	55.731
7	Emily Little (AUS)	14.766	13.166	13.633	13.600	55.165
8	Natsumi Sasada (JPN)	13.833	13.500	14.200	12.200	53.733
9	Claudia Fragapane (GBR)	14.633	12.633	13.500	11.766	52.532

=== Men ===
Rank	Gymnast	Floor (gymnastics)	Pommel horse	Rings (gymnastics)	Vault (gymnastics)	Parallel bars	Horizontal bar	Total
1st place, gold medalist(s)	Oleg Verniaiev (UKR)	14.766	14.366	15.266	15.233	15.900	15.066	90.597
2nd place, silver medalist(s)	Ryohei Kato (JPN)	15.066	14.500	14.666	15.300	15.433	15.133	90.098
3rd place, bronze medalist(s)	Donnell Whittenburg (USA)	15.400	13.966	15.500	15.300	15.400	14.366	89.932
4	Sam Mikulak (USA)	14.100	13.800	14.766	15.333	15.133	15.466	88.598
5	Yusuke Tanaka (JPN)	15.200	13.600	14.533	14.733	15.466	14.566	88.098
6	Jossimar Calvo (COL)	13.566	14.566	14.266	14.933	15.533	15.033	87.897
7	Andrey Likhovitskiy (BLR)	14.233	14.966	13.800	14.100	15.066	14.800	86.965
8	Daniel Purvis (GBR)	15.000	13.633	14.566	13.800	15.033	14.300	86.332
9	Alexis Torres Serrano (PUR)	13.066	13.366	14.833	14.566	14.300	13.533	83.664
