= Georgia Dabritz =

American artistic gymnast

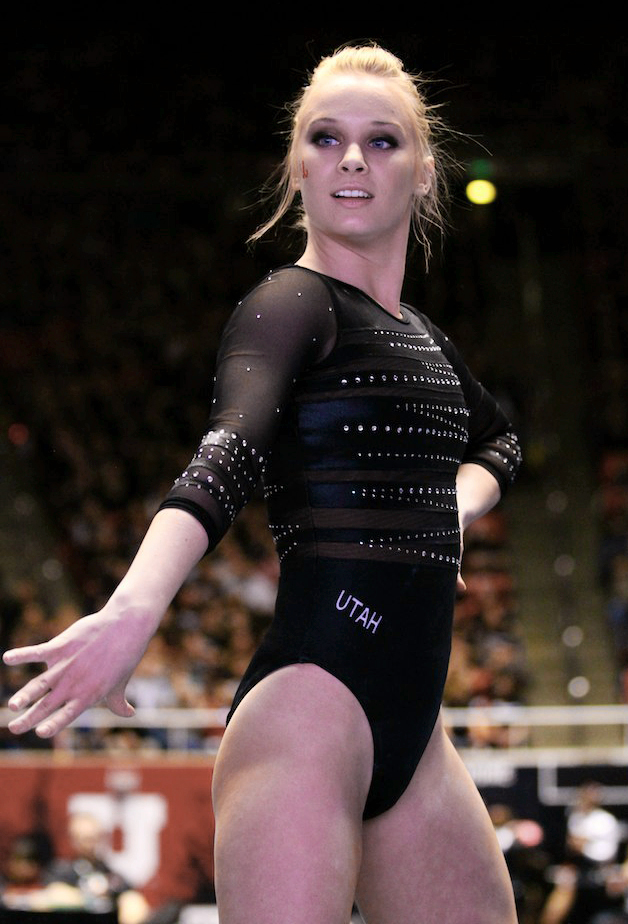
- Dabritz performing at a regular season meet against Stanford on February 23, 2013

Personal information
- Full name: Georgia Lee Dabritz
- Born: October 16, 1992 (age 34) Newburyport, Massachusetts, U.S.
- Height: 1.57 m (5 ft 2 in)

Gymnastics career
- Discipline: Women's artistic gymnastics
- College team: Utah Red Rocks
- Club: ACE
- Head coaches: Greg and Megan Marsden
- Retired: April 19, 2015

Georgia Lee Dabritz (born October 16, 1992) is an American retired college artistic gymnast, who was a member of the Utah Red Rocks women's gymnastics team from 2011 through to college graduation in 2015.

== Early life ==
Dabritz was born on October 16, 1992, in Massachusetts to parents, Karl Dabritz and Karen Tosti. She has two siblings, Elise and Russell, both of whom are involved in competitive gymnastics. Russell was a collegiate gymnast for the Minnesota Golden Gophers from 2009 to 2012 and Elise, a Lesley University graduate, was also a gymnast, later having a stint in gymnastics coaching for the YMCA.

Dabritz first started gymnastics at the age of 3, at Ace Gymnastics in Ipswich, Massachusetts and she remained with the club throughout her whole club career. Both of her parents are involved in gymnastics, also.

Dabritz graduated from Newburyport High School in 2011 and started attending the University of Utah in the fall of 2011, attending the school on a full-ride athletic scholarship to the women's gymnastics team. In 2015, Dabritz graduated from the school, majoring in Health, Society and Policy.

== Competitive club career ==
Dabritz won the 2007 U.S. Challenge at the age of 14 in July 2007, winning by less than 2 whole points. In 2008, she had a relatively quiet year with not much competition. However, in 2009, Dabritz qualified to Senior International Elite status. She was 2009 State Champion and later qualified to 2009 J.O. Nationals, finishing 26th in the Senior A division. She competed at both the 2009 and 2010 Visa U.S. Nationals and placed as high as seventh on bars in the 2009 edition. Dabritz dropped down to Level 10 for the 2011 season, her senior year, and was 2011 J.O. National Co-Champion for the Senior D division with Allison Flores.

== College career ==
Dabritz started her college career in 2012 as a freshman and made immediate impact to the Red Rocks team. She hit 41-44 routines during the season and was the NCAA Regional bars champion. She also placed tenth on vault at the 2012 NCAA Nationals. Georgia also made Dean's List and Athletic Director's Honor Roll and was later awarded 2012 Pac-12 Freshman of the Year.

After a successful freshman year, Dabritz returned as a sophomore for the 2013 season. She hit 47-53 routines during season. She also scored a Perfect 10.0 on Bars against Florida and also scored 39.700 in the all-around at that meet, which is the 8th-tied best score in the program's history. She was a 4-time All American, was the runner-up at the 2013 NCAA Nationals on bars and was Pac-12 Gymnast of the Week twice.

As a junior, Dabritz hit all 42 routines during the season and scored two Perfect 10's during the season (UB & FX) and a career high of 9.975 on Floor against Oregon State. She was a 5-time All-American and was 9th in the 2014 NCAA Vault Finals. She was Pac-12 Specialist of the Year and made Dean's List and Honor Roll for the third year.

In 2015, her senior season, Dabritz was the driving force behind Utah's second place finish in the NCAA women's gymnastics tournament. She won the 2015 AAI Award, which recognized her as the most outstanding senior collegiate female gymnast in the United States, as selected by NCAA gymnastics head coaches.
