= Richelle Simpson =

Canadian artistic gymnast

- Full name: Richelle Aiko Simpson
- Born: November 16, 1982 (age 43) Toronto, Ontario
- Height: 1.55 m (5 ft 1 in)

Gymnastics career
- Discipline: Women's artistic gymnastics
- Former countries represented: Canada
- College team: Nebraska Cornhuskers (2002–05); Penn State Nittany Lions (2001)
- Training location: Lincoln, Nebraska
- Club: Winstonettes GA
- Head coach: Dan Kendig
- Former coaches: Leonid Grakovsky, Debbie Vidmar
- Retired: 2005

Richelle Aiko Simpson (born November 16, 1982) is a retired Canadian artistic gymnast and current acrobat for the renowned Cirque du Soleil company. An elite level gymnast for five years, representing the Canadian National Team at both Pan American Games and the World Championships competitions during that period, Simpson enjoyed her career highlights as an NCAA collegiate student-athlete – competing as a member of the Nebraska Cornhuskers women's gymnastics program. She remains one of the program's finest ever gymnasts, holding a total of four individual school records. Additionally, she was the first Nebraska gymnast to receive first-team All-American awards in all five events, and is one of only two Nebraska gymnasts to win an NCAA National all-around title – an accomplishment she achieved in 2003.

== Life and career ==
=== 1982–97: Early life and career beginnings ===
Richelle Aiko Simpson was born on November 16, 1982, in Toronto to parents, Richard and Ruth Simpson. Although she started gymnastics classes at the age of 3 and a half years old, Simpson wasn't a natural; however, she soon progressed – and was a provincial level athlete in 1994; at the age of eleven. At this time, Simpson was training at the Gyros Gymnastics Club program in Toronto. Shortly after the 1994 season, Richelle moved to the Winstonettes Gymnastics Association club in Unionville, Ontario; the same program that created 1988 Olympian and Florida Gators gymnast Christina McDonald – training under the direction of Leonid Grakovsky and Debbie Vidmar.

After winning the provincial Level 3 title in the spring of 1996, Simpson exceeded expectations by transitioning from the provincial stream to the High Performance program. As a result, she received a qualification berth to the 1996 Elite Canada competition. A year later, during the mid-May 1997, Richelle participated in her first Canadian National Gymnastics Championships; making the Junior Elite division. After a strong first day of competition, tying for third position with Lise Leveille and qualifying to three event finals, Simpson sustained an injury during the second day's warm-ups and was forced to withdraw from the competition. As her injury wasn't too serious, Richelle was able to participate in the 1997 Elite Canada competition where she placed thirteenth – earning a qualification berth to the Senior High Performance the following season.

=== 1998–99: Senior International Elite career ===
To open her inaugural senior season, Simpson participated at both the Bluewater Invitational and the Wild Rose competition; finishing eighth in the all-around at both. At these competitions, Simpson was competing against renowned international gymnasts such as Elena Zamolodchikova, Ludmila Ezhova and Brenda Magana. Poised for more international success, Richelle competed at her second national championships, held in late May, in Hamilton, Ontario. A rough first day of competition left her in twenty-first place, despite qualifying to both the vault and floor event finals. However, a competent second day result rendered her to fourteenth in the all-around. Richelle finished her first senior season at the Elite Canada, placing in ninth all-around; after debuting some new and dynamic skills.

Simpson celebrated her best ever performance at the 1999 Canadian Championships in Burnaby, British Columbia – after she tallied a two-day score of 72.549 to place fifth in the all-around. Initially touted to make either the Pan American Games team and/or the World Championships team, she wasn't selected to either due to the high level of contenders, and battling through illness just after Nationals.
