= 2003 NCAA women's gymnastics championships =

American college gymnastics competition

- Venue: Bob Devaney Sports Center
- Location: Lincoln, Nebraska
- Dates: April 24–26, 2003
- Teams: 12

Champions
- Women: Richelle Simpson, Nebraska (39.800)
- Team: UCLA (4th)

The 2003 NCAA women's gymnastics championships were contested at the 22nd annual tournament hosted by the NCAA to determine the individual and team national champions of women's gymnastics among its member programs in the United States.

The competition took place from April 24–26 in Lincoln, Nebraska, hosted by the University of Nebraska–Lincoln at the Bob Devaney Sports Center.

UCLA won the team championship, the Bruins' fourth NCAA national title and first since 2001.

Richelle Simpson, from Nebraska, won the individual all-around championship.

== Team Results ==
=== Session 1 ===
Position	Team	Vault (gymnastics)	Uneven bars	Balance beam	Floor (gymnastics)	Total
1	UCLA	49.400	49.375	48.800	49.375	196.950
2	Alabama	49.375	49.050	49.200	49.150	196.775
3	Michigan	48.975	48.750	49.150	49.250	196.125
4	Arizona State	48.600	48.325	48.275	49.025	194.225
5	LSU	48.325	48.750	48.400	48.525	194.000
6	Iowa	48.250	48.025	48.800	48.750	193.825

=== Session 2 ===
Position	Team	Vault (gymnastics)	Uneven bars	Balance beam	Floor (gymnastics)	Total
1	Nebraska	49.375	49.225	49.225	49.500	197.325
2	Utah	49.350	49.250	49.125	49.125	196.850
3	Georgia	49.275	49.150	48.950	49.250	196.625
4	Florida	48.975	49.000	49.225	49.125	196.325
5	Stanford	49.150	48.975	49.200	48.875	196.200
6	Auburn	48.350	48.000	48.400	48.775	193.525

=== Super Six ===
Position	Team	Vault (gymnastics)	Uneven bars	Balance beam	Floor (gymnastics)	Total
1	UCLA	49.350	49.450	49.525	49.500	197.825
2	Alabama	49.225	49.425	49.250	49.375	197.275
3	Georgia	49.225	49.350	49.300	49.275	197.150
4	Nebraska	49.550	48.800	49.400	49.375	197.125
5	Michigan	48.950	48.800	49.075	49.225	196.050
6	Utah	49.225	48.675	48.350	49.050	195.300

== See also ==
- 2003 NCAA men's gymnastics championships
