= Bob Devaney Sports Center =

Sports complex at the University of Nebraska–Lincoln

Coordinates: 40.830207°N 96.697644°W

- "The Bob"
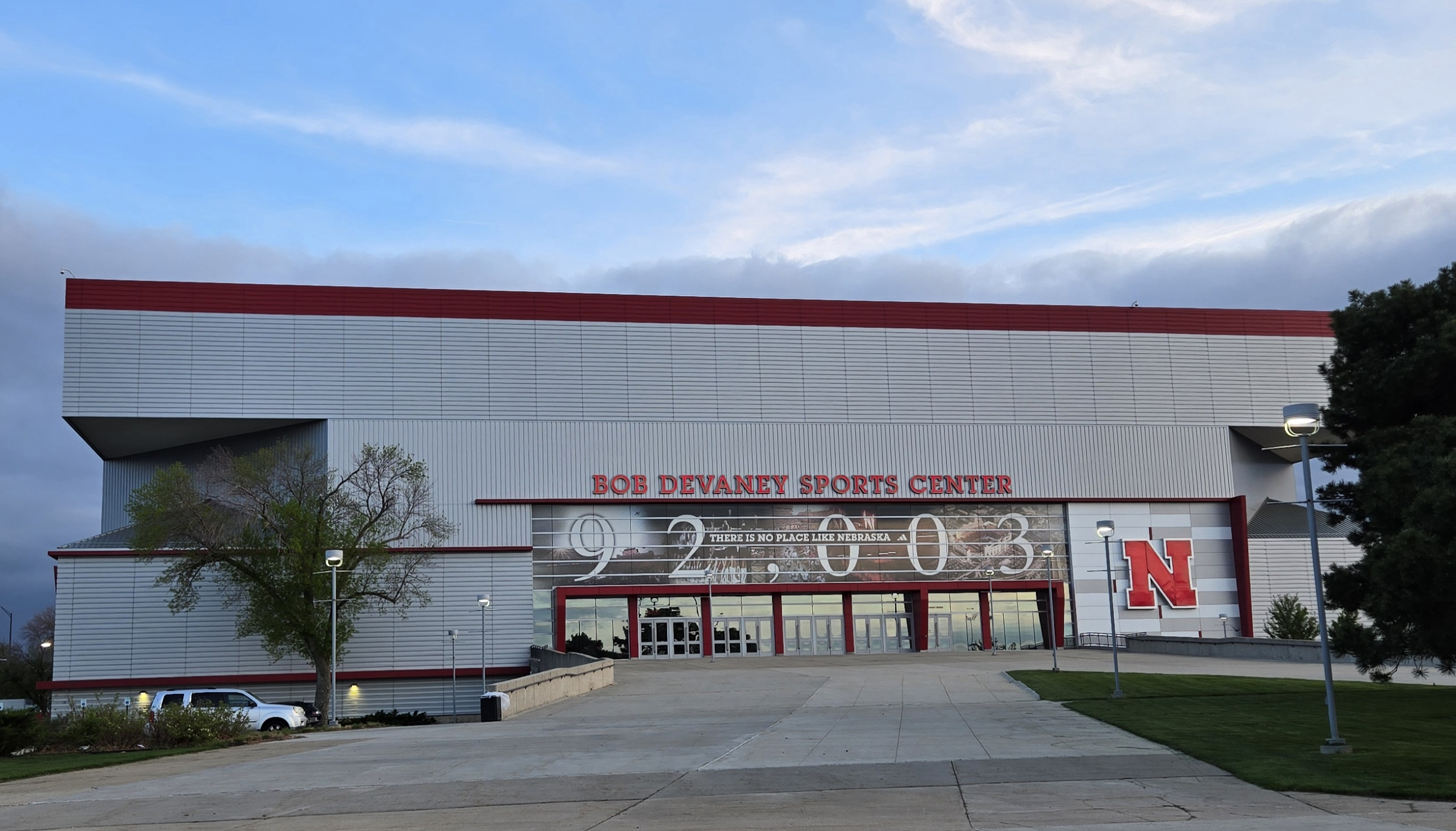
- North entrance of the Devaney Center in 2025
- Interactive map of Bob Devaney Sports Center
- Former names: NU Sports Complex
- Location: 1600 Court Street; Lincoln, Nebraska
- Owner: University of Nebraska–Lincoln
- Operator: University of Nebraska–Lincoln
- Capacity: 8,309 (volleyball); 5,000 (track & field); 1,000 (aquatics)
- Surface: Multi-surface

Construction
- Groundbreaking: 1974
- Opened: November 27, 1976; 49 years ago
- Renovated: 2012–2013
- Expanded: 2010–2011; 2018–2020
- Cost: $13 million ($73.6 million in 2025)
- Architect: Leo A Daly

Tenants
- Nebraska Cornhuskers (NCAA); Men's basketball (1976–2013); Women's basketball (1976–2013); Men's gymnastics (1976–present); Women's gymnastics (1976–present); Indoor track and field (1976–present); Swimming and diving (1976–present); Volleyball (2013–present); Wrestling (2013–present)

The Bob Devaney Sports Center (commonly shortened to Devaney Center) is a sports complex on the campus of the University of Nebraska–Lincoln in Lincoln, Nebraska. The facility, opened in 1976 as the NU Sports Complex, was named for football coach and athletic director Bob Devaney in 1978, and its main arena was dedicated as John Cook Arena in 2025.

The facility was built to replace the smaller NU Coliseum as the university's primary indoor athletic venue. It hosted men's and women's basketball for thirty-seven years until both programs moved off campus in 2013. Volleyball and wrestling relocated to the vacated Devaney Center, which was extensively modernized and had its main arena shrunk to a capacity of approximately 8,000. Nebraska has led collegiate volleyball in attendance each year at the venue. The sprawling complex also hosts gymnastics, indoor track and field, and swimming and diving events.

== Planning and construction ==
Nebraska football coach and athletic director Bob Devaney began campaigning for a new multi-sport arena as early as 1971, earning Board of Regents approval two years later. In 1974, construction began northeast of campus on the Nebraska State Fairgrounds, which would later be purchased by the university from the City of Lincoln. The $13.8-million project was financed using 2.5 of 13 cents allocated to a general university fund from a decades-old state cigarette tax, earning it the nickname "the house that cigarettes built."

When it opened in March 1976, the NU Sports Complex replaced the NU Coliseum as the home of most of the university's indoor sports. It had an arena capacity of 15,000, (Note: Some sources list the arena's initial capacity as 13,595, but the university officially claimed 15,000 throughout the late 1970s.) a natatorium capacity of 3,500, and a track capacity of 5,000. Athletic offices and locker rooms were located beneath the southern section of the main arena's bleachers. Two years later, the complex was named for Devaney, who won two national championships as a head coach and served as athletic director until 1992.

== Basketball ==
Nebraska played its first basketball game at the arena on November 27, 1976. The highest attendance recorded at the Devaney Center was 15,038, a 62–54 win over Oklahoma State on February 7, 1981. Much of the program's modest success at the arena came under head coach Danny Nee, who remembered the Devaney Center fondly: "I was so impressed with how it was designed, and the size was really cool. That building had charisma." NU struggled in the last years of Nee's tenure, after which the arena underwent a $7.9-million "Amenities Project" to create a more fan-friendly environment.

From December 1986 to January 1989, Nebraska's women's team won twenty-nine consecutive home games, an arena record. Decades later, an historic 2009–10 season produced the first regular-season sellout in program history, a 67–51 win over Missouri.

The Devaney Center hosted first- and second-round games in the 1980, 1984, and 1988 NCAA Division I men's basketball tournaments, and first-round women's games in 1993, including Nebraska's first victory in the competition. Michael Jordan and Magic Johnson played preseason NBA games at the arena; during a 1995 game featuring Jordan's Bulls against former NU star Eric Piatkowski and the Los Angeles Clippers, Chicago forward Dennis Rodman was called for two technical fouls and ejected to a standing ovation.

West Haymarket Arena (known as Pinnacle Bank Arena for sponsorship purposes) became the home venue for NU's basketball teams in 2013. Nebraska's men's team was 477–148 across thirty-seven years at the Devaney Center.

Hendricks Training Complex

Nebraska's basketball and wrestling teams practice and train at the Hendricks Training Complex in the southwest corner of the Devaney Center. The $18.7-million, 80,000-square foot facility houses a locker room, weight room, and an athletic medicine department.

== Volleyball ==
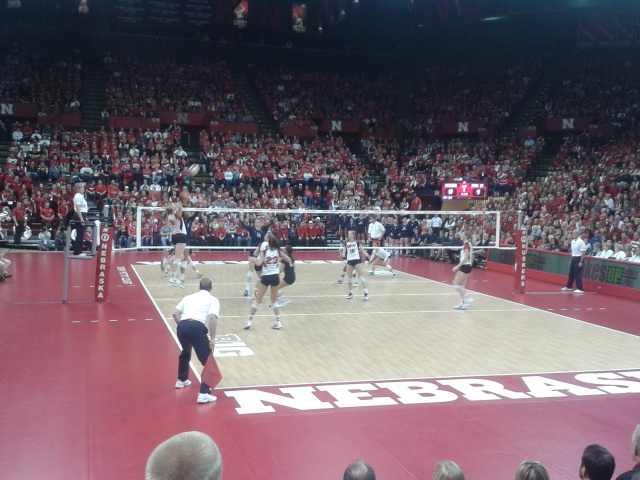
Nebraska vs. Penn State at the Devaney Center on Nov. 30, 2013

When construction began on West Haymarket Arena to host basketball, athletic director Tom Osborne led an effort to move volleyball from the NU Coliseum to the vacated Devaney Center, which had previously hosted select games, as well as the entire 1991 season while the Coliseum was being renovated. Head coach John Cook resisted the relocation proposal, relenting when the university committed to a $27-million redevelopment of the facility. Thousands of seats were removed from the main arena, lowering capacity to around 8,000 with luxury suites for boosters and courtside seating for students, and the outdated venue received extensive modernization. The playing surface was dedicated in honor of Terry Pettit in 2013 and the main arena was named for Cook after his retirement in 2025, with a statue to be erected on the north side of the complex.

The arena's listed capacity is 8,309, including standing-room-only areas, though proposed future expansions will raise capacity to nearly 10,000 by 2026. Nebraska has led the country in attendance by a wide margin each year since the move and extended its record 337-match sellout streak. (Note: Sellout streaks and home attendance figures do not include the 2021 spring season in which many schools, including Nebraska, did not host fans due to the COVID-19 pandemic.) The program has consistently turned a profit since moving to the Devaney Center, a rarity in women's sports, peaking at a record $1.3 million in 2023. According to Lincoln's daily newspaper, the Lincoln Journal Star, in the 2022 fiscal year, NU women's volleyball was the only women's sports team in basketball's generally recognized power conferences (the current Power Four football conferences, the pre-2024 Pac-12 Conference, and the Big East Conference) that turned a profit.

== Other sports ==
Gymnastics

The main arena at the Devaney Center has hosted gymnastics since 1976, including several conference and national postseason events. In the 1986 NCAA men's championship, judges deliberated for nearly an hour before determining Nebraska had filed an "incorrect inquiry procedure," declaring Arizona State the national champion by less than a point. The Devaney Center hosted ten NCAA men's events and the 2003 and 2009 women's tournaments. A gymnastics practice facility, the Francis Allen Training Center, opened in April 2020.

Swimming

The Devaney Center Natatorium was built as part of the original facility in 1976. The venue hosted several Big Eight and Big 12 conference meets, but is now considered outdated. Its pool is undersized at just twenty-five yards in length, and is considered among the worst in the Big Ten. The natatorium has a listed capacity of 1,000.

Track and field

The Devaney Center has served as the home venue of Nebraska's indoor track and field program since it was constructed. A 200-meter hydraulic-banked track, the largest of its kind in the world, was the focal point of a $2.9-million renovation in 2000. The track seats up to 5,000 spectators and has hosted championship meets for each of the Big Eight, Big 12, and Big Ten.

High school sports

The Devaney Center was the primary host of the Nebraska School Activities Association Boys and Girls State Basketball tournament for nearly four decades. Omaha Benson High School's Andre Wooldridge set an arena scoring record in 1992 with fifty points in the Class A championship game. The bulk of the tournament moved to Pinnacle Bank Arena in 2013, but the Devaney Center continues to host a lesser number of games each year, primarily quarterfinals and semifinals in smaller classifications. It also hosts state championship matches for NSAA volleyball state tournaments.

== Concerts and other events ==
The Devaney Center was the primary concert destination in Lincoln throughout the late 1970s and 1980s, and regularly hosted events until the early 2000s. Notable performers at the arena include Crosby, Stills & Nash, Elton John, Billy Joel, Frank Sinatra, Bruce Springsteen, Def Leppard, Van Halen, Bob Dylan, and Garth Brooks.
