= 2004 NCAA women's gymnastics championships =

American college gymnastics competition

- Venue: Pauley Pavilion
- Location: Los Angeles, California
- Dates: April 15–17, 2004
- Teams: 12

Champions
- Women: Jeana Rice, Alabama (39.650)
- Team: UCLA (5th)

The 2004 NCAA women's gymnastics championships were contested at the 23rd annual tournament hosted by the NCAA to determine the individual and team national champions of women's gymnastics among its member programs in the United States.

The competition took place April 15–17 in Los Angeles, California, hosted by UCLA at Pauley Pavilion.

Hosts and defending champions UCLA won the team championship, the Bruins' fifth NCAA national title and fifth in seven years.

Jeana Rice, from Alabama, won the individual all-around championship.

== Team Results ==
=== Session 1 ===
Position	Team	Vault (gymnastics)	Uneven bars	Balance beam	Floor (gymnastics)	Total
1	Florida	49.375	49.000	49.125	49.350	196.850
1	Stanford	49.050	49.350	48.975	49.475	196.850
3	Georgia	49.225	49.250	48.975	49.225	196.775
4	Nebraska	49.250	49.125	48.875	48.900	196.150
5	Oklahoma	49.200	48.725	48.600	49.225	195.750
6	Iowa	48.950	48.725	47.800	49.300	194.775

=== Session 2 ===
Position	Team	Vault (gymnastics)	Uneven bars	Balance beam	Floor (gymnastics)	Total
1	UCLA	49.350	49.650	49.225	49.450	197.675
2	Alabama	49.400	49.450	49.025	49.450	197.325
3	Utah	49.275	49.350	49.100	49.200	196.925
4	LSU	49.300	49.275	48.775	49.300	196.650
5	Michigan	49.150	49.025	49.100	49.225	196.500
6	Arizona State	49.300	48.950	48.925	49.150	196.325

=== Super Six ===
Position	Team	Vault (gymnastics)	Uneven bars	Balance beam	Floor (gymnastics)	Total
1	UCLA	49.525	49.425	49.600	49.575	198.125
2	Georgia	49.425	49.125	49.200	49.450	197.200
3	Alabama	49.375	49.050	49.225	49.475	197.125
3	Stanford	49.350	49.200	49.250	49.325	197.125
5	Florida	49.400	48.800	49.300	49.300	196.800
6	Utah	49.150	48.325	49.225	49.175	195.875

== UCLA roster ==
The 2004 UCLA women's gymnastics team is considered one of the best teams in NCAA gymnastics history, which was led by 7-time National Champion head coach Valorie Kondos Field.

UCLA was ranked preseason #1 for the fourth consecutive year and team members had collectively won seven NCAA individual championships, earned 27 All-America honors and made 13 World Championships and five Olympic appearances. The team returned five All-Americans and had talent throughout the depth of their lineup down to the "dynamic freshmen talent."

Seniors

- Jeanette Antolin
- Jamie Dantzscher
- Christy Erickson
- Kristen Maloney
- Trishna Patel
- Yvonne Tousek
- Jamie Williams

Juniors

- Kisha Auld
- Christie Tedmon

Sophomores

- Kate Richardson
- Holly Murdock
- Jennifer Sutton

Freshmen

- Ashley Martin
- Ashley Peckett
- Michelle Selesky (Michelle Giuda)
- Aimee Walker (Aimee Walker Pond)
- Courtney Walker
- Lori Winn

== See also ==
- 2004 NCAA men's gymnastics championships
