= 2001 NCAA women's gymnastics championships =

American college gymnastics competition

- Venue: Stegeman Coliseum
- Location: Athens, Georgia
- Dates: April 18–20, 2002
- Teams: 12

Champions
- Women: Onnie Willis, UCLA; Elise Ray, Michigan (39.525)
- Team: UCLA (3rd)

The 2001 NCAA women's gymnastics championships were contested at the 20th annual tournament hosted by the NCAA to determine the individual and team national champions of women's gymnastics among its member programs in the United States.

The competition took place from April 19–21 in Athens, Georgia, hosted by the University of Georgia at the Georgia Coliseum.

Defending champions UCLA again won the team national championship, the Bruins' third NCAA national title and third in four years.

Onnie Willis, also from UCLA, and Elise Ray, from Michigan, shared the individual all-around championship with scores of 39.525.

== Team Results ==
=== Session 1 ===
Position	Team	Vault (gymnastics)	Uneven bars	Balance beam	Floor (gymnastics)	Total
1	UCLA	49.200	49.525	49.375	49.525	197.625
2	Michigan	49.100	49.100	49.050	49.275	196.525
3	Alabama	49.000	48.975	49.175	49.225	196.375
4	Florida	48.950	48.700	48.975	49.200	195.825
5	Oklahoma	48.100	48.525	48.425	48.875	193.875
6	Oregon State	48.725	48.075	48.775	48.200	193.775

=== Session 2 ===
Position	Team	Vault (gymnastics)	Uneven bars	Balance beam	Floor (gymnastics)	Total
1	Georgia	49.400	49.075	49.175	49.450	197.100
2	Utah	48.875	48.975	49.425	49.300	196.575
3	Nebraska	48.800	49.200	49.050	49.150	196.200
4	Stanford	48.825	48.675	48.725	49.175	195.400
5	Arizona State	48.900	48.525	48.300	49.050	194.775
6	Denver	48.425	48.325	48.375	48.500	193.625

=== Super Six ===
Position	Team	Vault (gymnastics)	Uneven bars	Balance beam	Floor (gymnastics)	Total
1	UCLA	49.450	49.125	49.575	49.425	197.575
2	Georgia	49.500	49.250	49.275	49.375	197.400
3	Michigan	49.375	49.275	49.250	49.375	197.275
4	Alabama	48.975	49.100	49.175	49.300	196.550
5	Utah	48.900	49.150	48.675	49.300	196.025
5	Nebraska	49.050	49.150	48.650	49.175	196.025

== See also ==
- 2001 NCAA men's gymnastics championships
