= Megan Marsden =

American gymnast and coach (born 1962)

Current position
- Team: Utah Red Rocks
- Conference: Pac-12

Biographical details
- Born: June 6, 1962 (age 64); Cedar Falls, Iowa, U.S.
- Education: Utah (1985)

Playing career
- 1982–1985: Utah Red Rocks

Coaching career (HC unless noted)
- 1997–2019: Utah

Accomplishments and honors

Awards
- Honda Award (1984)

Megan Marsden (born Megan McCunniff; June 6, 1962) is an American gymnastics coach and former collegiate gymnast. Marsden has had a career at the University of Utah and the Utah Red Rocks team that has amassed over thirty years; both as a student-athlete and as a coach. Since 2010, she has been the Co-Head Coach of the Red Rocks program, and shared the duties with her husband Greg Marsden until his retirement after the 2015 season. As a student-athlete, Marsden remains one of Utah's top performers, the winner of three individual National titles. Her achievements, both as an athlete and a coach, have led Marsden to become a recipient of awards such as the Honda Award (1984), and Pac-12 Coach of the Year (2014).
