= Stanford Cardinal women's gymnastics =

Sports team

- Founded: 1978
- University: Stanford University
- Athletic director: John Donahoe
- Head coach: Tabitha Yim
- Conference: ACC
- Home arena: Burnham Pavilion (Stanford University)
- Colors: Cardinal and white

Super Six appearances
- 2002, 2007, 2008, 2010, 2012, 2015

NCAA Regional championships
- 1980, 1981, 1982, 1984, 1985, 1986, 1987, 1988, 1989, 1990, 1991, 1992, 1993, 1994, 1995, 1996, 1997, 1998, 1999, 2000, 2001, 2002, 2003, 2004, 2005, 2006, 2007, 2008, 2009, 2010, 2011, 2012, 2013, 2014, 2015, 2016, 2017, 2018, 2019, 2022, 2023, 2024, 2025, 2026

NCAA Tournament appearances
- 1992, 1996, 1999, 2001, 2002, 2003, 2004, 2007, 2008, 2009, 2010, 2012, 2013, 2014, 2015, 2016, 2024, 2026

Conference championships
- Pac-12: 1980, 1981, 1982, 1998, 2001, 2004, 2006, 2008; ACC: 2025

The Stanford Cardinal women's gymnastics team represents Stanford University in NCAA women's artistic gymnastics.

== Championships ==
=== Super Six appearances ===
Stanford Cardinal Super Six Appearances
Year	Finish	Score
2002	6th	196.025
2004	3rd	197.125
2007	5th	196.825
2008	3rd	196.750
2010	4th	197.100
2012	4th	197.500
2015	5th	197.250

=== Individual champions ===
Stanford Individual Champions
Name	Year	Event
Larissa Fontaine	1998	VT
Carly Janiga	2010	UB
Elizabeth Price	2015	VT
Elizabeth Price	2018	UB
Anna Roberts	2024	VT

== Current roster ==
Name	Height	Year	Hometown
Ondine Achampong	5-5	JR	Kings Langley, England
Ana Bărbosu	5-3	SO	Focșani, Romania
Kendra Chang	5-2	JR	Cupertino, CA
Victoria Cluck	5-2	SR	Frisco, TX
Jaime Dugan	5-4	JR	Woodinville, WA
Sydney Fleming	5-4	FR	Orlando, FL
Summer Gronski	5-6	SO	Newport Beach, CA
Levi Jung-Ruivivar	5-6	JR	Los Angeles, CA
Temple Landry	5-2	SR	Maple Grove, MN
Raeya Linton	5-0	FR	Columbia, MD
Sienna Robinson	5-1	SR	Las Vegas, NV
Maeya Sagna	5-5	SO	New York, NY
Natalie Siljander	5-6	SO	Encinitas, CA
Ui Soma	5-2	JR	Belmont, CA
Alana Walker	5-4	JR	West Orange, NJ
Mya Wiley	5-2	JR	Silverdale, WA
Jennifer Williams	5-3	SO	Stockholm, Sweden
Alicia Zhou	5-3	FR	San Antonio, TX

=== Coaching staff ===
Name	Position	Seasons
Tabitha Yim	Head coach	2017–present
Vince Smurro	Associate head coach	2022–present
Hallie Mossett	Assistant coach	2023–present
Caleb Rickard	Assistant Coach	2025–present

== Stanford gymnasts at the Olympics ==
Year	Country	Name	Medal(s)
1984	Israel	Nancy Goldsmith	
1996	Canada	Jennifer Exaltacion	
2000	Canada	Lise Leveille	
2004	Canada	Heather Purnell	
2008	Australia	Shona Morgan	
2008	Great Britain	Rebecca Wing	
2012	Canada	Kristina Vaculik	
2016	Canada	Isabela Onyshko	
2020	Singapore	Tan Sze En	
2024	Philippines	Levi Jung-Ruivivar	
2024	Romania	Ana Bărbosu	floor
