= Greg Marsden =

American gymnastics coach

Current position
- Title: Head coach
- Team: University of Utah
- Conference: Pac-12

Biographical details
- Born: Hanford, California, U.S.
- Education: Central Arkansas

Coaching career (HC unless noted)
- 1976–2015: Utah

Head coaching record
- Overall: 1048-208-8

Accomplishments and honors

Championships
- 1981 AIAW Women's Gymnastics championship 1982 NCAA Women's Gymnastics champions 1983 NCAA Women's Gymnastics champions 1984 NCAA Women's Gymnastics champions 1985 NCAA Women's Gymnastics champions 1986 NCAA Women's Gymnastics champions 1990 NCAA Women's Gymnastics champions 1992 NCAA Women's Gymnastics champions 1994 NCAA Women's Gymnastics champions 1995 NCAA Women's Gymnastics champions

Awards
- National Coach of the Year (7-time)

Greg Marsden (November 8, 1950) was the NCAA women's gymnastics coach at the University of Utah. He led the Utah Red Rocks to 10 national titles and was named National Coach of the Year 7 times. He also served as the U.S.A. National Women's Team coach in 1987.

== Biography ==
Marsden was born on November 8, 1950, in Hanford, California. He received his bachelor's degree in Physical Education from Central Arkansas in 1972 and his Masters from Arkansas State in 1973.

== Coaching career ==
Marsden's record is 1048-208-8. He has coached his team to 10 Championships overall (9 NCAA Championships) and 18 Top-2 national finishes, and is a 7-time National Coach of the Year. He served as U.S.A. National Women's Team coach in 1987.

== Retirement ==
On April 20, 2015, Marsden announced his retirement from the Utah Red Rocks team after 40 years as head coach. His wife, Megan, and assistant coach, Tom Farden, succeeded him.

== Personal life ==
Marsden is married to one of his former athletes, Megan Marsden, formerly Megan McCunniff, a three-time NCAA all-champion, and as of July 2009 the co-head coach of the Red Rocks. She has been an assistant coach since 1985. Together they have two sons, Montana and Dakota.
