= Utah Red Rocks =

Women's gymnastics team at the University of Utah

- Founded: 1976
- University: University of Utah
- Head coach: Carly Dockendorf
- Conference: Big 12
- Location: Salt Lake City, Utah
- Home arena: Jon M. Huntsman Center (Capacity: 15,000)
- Nickname: Red Rocks, Utes
- Colors: Red and white

National championships
- 1981*,1982, 1983, 1984, 1985, 1986, 1990, 1992, 1994, 1995 (*AIAW National Championship)

Four on the Floor appearances
- 2021, 2022, 2023, 2024, 2025

Super Six appearances
- 1982, 1983, 1984, 1985, 1986, 1987, 1988, 1989, 1990, 1991, 1992, 1993, 1994, 1995, 1996, 1998, 2000, 2001, 2002, 2003, 2004, 2005, 2006, 2007, 2008, 2009, 2010, 2011, 2012, 2015, 2017, 2018

NCAA Regional championships
- 34

NCAA Tournament appearances
- 1982, 1983, 1984, 1985, 1986, 1987, 1988, 1989, 1990, 1991, 1992, 1993, 1994, 1995, 1996, 1997, 1998, 1999, 2000, 2001, 2002, 2003, 2004, 2005, 2006, 2007, 2008, 2009, 2010, 2011, 2012, 2013, 2014, 2015, 2016, 2017, 2018, 2019, 2021, 2022, 2023, 2024, 2025, 2026

Conference championships
- Pac-12 Conference: 2014, 2015, 2017, 2021, 2022, 2023,2024; Pac-12 Regular Season: 2020, 2021, 2022, 2023; Big 12 Conference: 2025, 2026; Big 12 Regular Season: 2025, 2026

The Utah Utes women's gymnastics team, also known as the Red Rocks, represents the University of Utah and competes at the Division I level of the National Collegiate Athletic Association (NCAA) as members of the Big 12 Conference. Home meets are held in the Jon M. Huntsman Center in Salt Lake City, Utah. As of the end of the 2024 season, the Red Rocks have won 10 national championships, including nine NCAA Gymnastics championships, and been runner-up nine times. Until 2026, the Red Rocks were the only team to have qualified for every NCAA Championships and had never finished lower than 10th. The team was coached from its inception by Greg Marsden until his retirement after the 2015 season. Carly Dockendorf is the current head coach, after the release of Tom Farden in 2023.

== History ==
The Utah Utes gymnastics team first competed in 1976. The team first appeared on television in 1978 and has appeared every year since then. The NCAA first sponsored women's gymnastics national championships in 1982. Utah was the only team to qualify for every national championship until their loss in the 2026 Sweet-16, ending their 49-year streak.

=== Pac-12 Conference ===
The University of Utah became a member of the newly expanded Pac-12 Conference in 2011, and the Red Rocks became one of eight teams in the conference to compete in women's gymnastics. Utah has taken the Pac-12 Championships seven times since joining the conference, winning in 2014, 2015, 2017, 2021, 2022, 2023 and 2024. The Red Rocks have won or shared a portion of the Regular Season Pac-12 Championship since its inauguration - the 2020 season is the first time each of the eight Pac-12 teams competed against every other team in the conference. The Red Rocks won outright in 2020 and 2021, and shared the title in a four-way tie in both 2022 and 2023.

Utah gymnasts have won the individual all-around title at the Pac-12 Championship five times:

Year	Gymnast	Score
2012	Corrie Lothrop	39.625
2014	Tory Wilson	39.450
2015	Georgia Dabritz	39.775
2016	Breanna Hughes	39.550
2021	Maile O'Keefe	39.700

=== Big 12 Conference ===
In 2024, the University of Utah was one of ten members of the Pac-12 who announced they would be moving to a different conference. Utah, alongside the University of Arizona and Arizona State University, moved to the Big 12 Conference. They officially started competition in the Big 12 Conference in the 2024–2025 season.

Since moving to the Big 12, Utah has won the conference championship and had the individual champion every year. Utah has had two individual All-Around conference champions:

Year	Gymnast	Score
2025	Grace McCallum	39.550
2026	Avery Neff	39.700

== Nickname ==
The nickname "Red Rocks" has its origins in the Utah Gymnastics 1992 media guide cover photo. At the time, all Utah women's sports teams used the moniker "Lady Utes". The name is a combination of "how rock solid they are, but also the red rock of southern Utah.” The 1992 team won the NCAA championship, with the name sticking.

== Traditions ==
=== Rock The House ===
Before the final home rotation to floor, the Red Rocks stand together in a circle in the center of the floor, put their arms around each other, and chant in unison "Who rocks the house? We say the Utes rock the house! And when the Utes rock the house we rock it all the way down!" This is done three times. During the chant, the Red Rocks will sway back and forth, then jump and strike their feet on the floor at the end of each verse. The words are not displayed in the arena but fans are welcome to learn the words and join in on the chant.

=== "Red Rocks" Call and Response ===
Beginning in the 2024 season, Red Rock gymnasts will approach the student section before the first rotation and shout "Red!" in unison. The student section responds with "Rocks!" This is done three times.

=== Stick'd Board ===
During the 2025 Utah Gymnastics season, Trevor Coyle, Mitch Brown, and Kai Cruz––student leaders of the Mighty Utah Student Section, the University of Utah's official student section organization––came up with a new idea for a Utah Red Rocks student tradition. The idea was to celebrate every time a Red Rock stuck a landing by writing their name on a sticky note and slapping it onto a board in front of the student section. They took an old sandwich board and wrote "STICK'D" on the blank side in large black letters, then collected pink sticky notes and a black marker to write down the names. The idea was first implemented at the concluding home meet of the 2025 season when #2 UCLA visited #4 Utah on March 15th, 2025. The Stick'd Board was met with praises from fans, Utah Red Rock Gymnasts, and the Utah Gymnastics Event Coordinator, who said that the board would become a permanent fixture in front of the student section for gymnastics meets.

Following the 2025 season the original Stick'd Board was replaced with a professionally made version. The original is displayed in the boardroom of the Mighty Utah Student Section in the Alumni House at the University of Utah.

== Roster ==
2026–27 Roster
Name	Height	Year	Hometown	Club
Norah Christian	5-3	SO	Bremerton, WA	Cascade Elite Gymnastics West
Sage Curtis	4-11	SO	Riverton, UT	Olympus Gymnastics
Elizabeth Gantner	4-11	SR	Indianapolis, IN	Jaycie Phelps Athletic Center
Léonie Gervais	5-3	FR	Trois-Rivières, QC	Gym TRM
Zoe Johnson	5-1	JR	Durham, NC	Sonshine Gymnastics
Ayla Miller	5-2	FR	Big Lake, MN	Twin City Twisters
Avery Neff	5-4	JR	South Jordan, UT	Olympus Gymnastics
Clara Raposo	5-1	JR	Toronto, ON	East York Gymnastics
Abbi Ryssman	5-1	SO	Rochester, MN	Flips Gymnastics
Poppy-Grace Stickler	5-3	JR	Cardiff, Wales	Cymru Caerdydd
Bailey Stroud	5-4	SO	New Palestine, IN	Jaycie Phelps Athletic Center
Lilly Tubbs	5-8	GR	Pflugerville, TX	AcroTex Gymnastics
Arielle Ward	5-8	GR	Frisco, TX	Metroplex
Camie Winger	5-3	SR	Orem, UT	Bold Gymnastics
Ella Zirbes	5-3	SR	Stillwater, MN	Flips Gymnastics

== National records ==
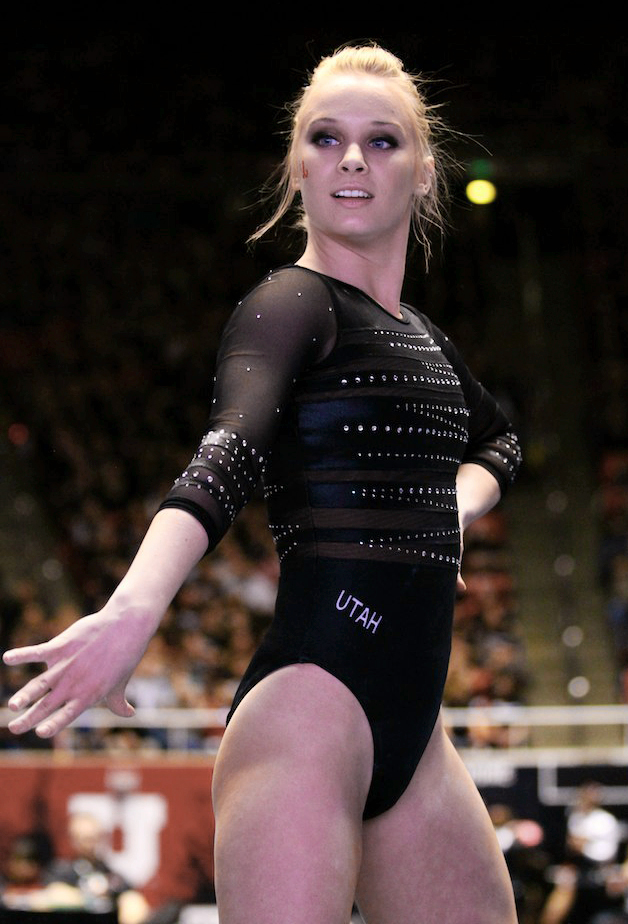
Georgia Dabritz at the Huntsman Center in 2013.

- Utah has won a record 10 national championships (tied with Georgia). Nine of them were NCAA Women's Gymnastics championships and one was an AIAW Women's Gymnastics championship in 1981 before the NCAA adopted women's gymnastics.
- Utah ties with Georgia for the record of the most consecutive NCAA national championships with 5 (1982–1986).
- Utah qualified for every AIAW championship between the team's creation 1976 and 1981. After gymnastics was adopted by the NCAA in 1982, until 2025, Utah was the only team to have qualified for every NCAA national championship. Utah set the record with a 49-year streak of attending the national championship.
- Utah has the most All-American gymnast awards of any school with 398.
- Utah gymnastics set the longest regular season home win streak of any NCAA sport at 23 years (1979–2002) and 170 meets.
- Utah has led the nation in gymnastics attendance 37 times and has won eleven all-women's sports attendance titles.
- On March 6, 2015, Utah had an overflow crowd of 16,019 on hand for its win over Michigan, setting the NCAA gymnastics record for largest crowd in a single meet.
- In the 2020 season, Utah averaged a record 15,273 fans per meet. Between 2010 and 2020, Utah averaged more than 14,500 fans a meet.

== Coaches ==
=== Head coaches ===
Name	Years	Record
Greg Marsden	1976 - 2015	1048-208-8
Megan Marsden	2000–2019	151-54-3
Tom Farden	2016–2023	101-33-1
Carly Dockendorf	2024–present	

Greg Marsden was hired in 1976 to begin the gymnastics program. Marsden coached Utah for 40 straight years. He is the only collegiate gymnastics coach to amass 1,000 wins and earn Coach of the Year honors seven times. He has never had a team finish worse than tenth place overall.

In July 2009 Megan Marsden was named co-head coach of the Red Rocks. Megan, in addition to being Greg's wife, is a former member of the squad and has been an assistant coach since 1985.

After the 2015 season, Greg retired and his wife Megan and assistant coach Tom Farden were named co-head coaches. On 22 April 2019, Megan Marsden announced her retirement, and it was confirmed that current co-head coach Tom Farden would continue as the sole head coach. Farden left his position in November 2023 after numerous people came forward with allegations of abuse.

In November 2023, associate head coach Carly Dockendorf agreed to serve as the Interim Head Coach.

=== Current coaching staff ===
Name	Position
Carly Dockendorf	Head coach
Steve Arkell	Assistant coach
Myia Hambrick	Assistant coach
Mike Hunger	Assistant coach

== Post-season history ==
NATIONAL CHAMPIONSHIPS
Year	Finish	Score	Coach
1976	Tenth Place	101.65	Greg Marsden
1977	Ninth Place	138.50	Greg Marsden
1978	Sixth Place	141.10	Greg Marsden
1979	Fourth Place	138.10	Greg Marsden
1980	Second Place	144.15	Greg Marsden
1981	Champions	145.65	Greg Marsden
1982	Champions	148.60	Greg Marsden
1983	Champions	184.65	Greg Marsden
1984	Champions	186.05	Greg Marsden
1985	Champions	188.35	Greg Marsden
1986	Champions	186.95	Greg Marsden
1987	Second Place	187.55	Greg Marsden
1988	Second Place	189.50	Greg Marsden
1989	Fifth Place	190.20	Greg Marsden
1990	Champions	194.900	Greg Marsden
1991	Second Place	194.375	Greg Marsden
1992	Champions	195.65	Greg Marsden
1993	Third Place	195.825	Greg Marsden
1994	Champions	196.400	Greg Marsden
1995	Champions	196.650	Greg Marsden
1996	T-Third Place	196.775	Greg Marsden
1997	Seventh Place	196.025	Greg Marsden
1998	Fourth Place	196.025	Greg Marsden
1999	Seventh Place	195.475	Greg Marsden
2000	Second Place	196.875	Greg Marsden
2001	T-Fifth Place	196.025	Greg Marsden
2002	Fourth Place	196.950	Greg Marsden
2003	Sixth Place	195.300	Greg Marsden
2004	Sixth Place	195.775	Greg Marsden
2005	Third Place	197.275	Greg Marsden
2006	Second Place	196.800	Greg Marsden
2007	Second Place	197.250	Greg Marsden
2008	Second Place	197.125	Greg Marsden
2009	Third Place	197.425	Greg Marsden
2010	Sixth Place	196.225	Greg Marsden / Megan Marsden
2011	Fifth Place	196.500	Greg Marsden / Megan Marsden
2012	Fifth Place	197.375	Greg Marsden / Megan Marsden
2013	Ninth Place	196.200	Greg Marsden / Megan Marsden
2014	Seventh Place	197.025	Greg Marsden / Megan Marsden
2015	Second Place	197.800	Greg Marsden / Megan Marsden
2016	Ninth Place	195.762	Megan Marsden / Tom Farden
2017	Fifth Place	196.5875	Megan Marsden / Tom Farden
2018	Fifth Place	196.900	Megan Marsden / Tom Farden
2019	Seventh Place	196.725	Megan Marsden / Tom Farden
2020	Post-season canceled due to COVID-19 pandemic		
2021	Third Place	197.9875	Tom Farden
2022	Third Place	197.7500	Tom Farden
2023	Third Place	197.9375	Tom Farden
2024	Third Place	197.8000	Carly Dockendorf
2025	Fourth Place	197.2375	Carly Dockendorf
2026	Did not qualify		

== NCAA Champions ==
As of the end of the 2024 season, 16 different Utah gymnasts have won a total of 32 individual event championships.

Event	Winner/Year
Team	1982, 1983, 1984, 1985, 1986, 1990, 1992, 1994, 1995
All Around	Sue Stednitz 1982; Megan Marsden 1983, 1984; Melissa Marlowe 1992; Theresa Kulikowski 1999; Maile O'Keefe 2023
Vault	Elaine Alfano 1982, 1983, 1985; Megan Marsden 1984; Kristen Kenoyer 1992; MyKayla Skinner 2018; Jaedyn Rucker 2022
Uneven Bars	Melissa Marlowe 1992; Sandy Woolsey 1992; Angie Leonard 1999; Kristina Baskett 2006; Georgia Dabritz 2015; Maile O'Keefe 2021
Balance Beam	Sue Stednitz 1982; Melissa Marlowe 1991, 1992; Summer Reid 1996, 1997; Theresa Kulikowski 1999, 2001; Ashley Postell 2007; Maile O'Keefe 2023
Floor Exercise	Lisa Mitzel 1985; Melissa Marlowe 1992; MyKayla Skinner 2017; Maile O'Keefe 2021

== Team records ==
=== Top team total ===
Rank	Score	Meet	Year
1	198.600	Brigham Young	2004
2	198.575	Minnesota	2022
3	198.550	California	2023
4	198.425	Brigham Young	2002
5	198.300	Stanford, Utah State	2024
6	198.250	Michigan	2015
7	198.225	National Semifinal	2023
8	198.200	Regional Final	2022
8	198.200	UCLA	2023
10	198.150	Georgia	2018
10	198.150	Pac-12 Championship	2015

=== Top event totals ===
Apparatus	Score	Meet	Year
Vault	49.775	Brigham Young	2004
Bars	49.800	Minnesota	2022
Beam	49.775	UCLA	2020
Beam	49.775	UCLA	2023
Floor	49.800	Brigham Young	2001

=== Top Individual All-Around ===
Rank	Score	Gymnast	Year
1	39.950	Suzanne Metz	1995
2	39.900	Kristen Kenoyer	1993
3	39.875	Melissa Vituj	2004
4	39.825	Grace McCallum	2024
5	39.800	Ashley Postell	2008
5	39.800	Melissa Vituj	2004
5	39.800	Theresa Kulikowski	2002
5	39.800	Theresa Kulikowski	2002
5	39.800	Kristen Kenoyer	1993

== Utah gymnasts at the Olympics ==
=== Olympians ===
Year	Country	Name	Medal(s)
1988	United States	Missy Marlowe	
2008	Canada	Nansy Damianova	
2008	Germany	Daria Bijak	
2020	Great Britain	Amelie Morgan	team
2020	United States	Grace McCallum	team
2020	United States	MyKayla Skinner	vault

=== Alternates ===
Year	Country	Name
2008	United States	Corrie Lothrop
2016	United States	MyKayla Skinner
2020	United States	Kara Eaker
