= Sandy Woolsey =

American artistic gymnast

- Born: August 15, 1972 (age 54) Denver, Colorado, U.S.

Gymnastics career
- Discipline: Women's artistic gymnastics
- Country represented: United States; (1988–1991)
- College team: Utah Red Rocks
- Gym: Desert Devils
- Former coach: Mark ‘Stormy’ Eaton
Medal record
Representing Utah Red Rocks
NCAA Championships
Bronze medal – third place	1993, Corvallis, Oregon	Team
Gold medal – first place	1994 Salt Lake City	Team
Gold medal – first place	1994 Salt Lake City	Uneven Bars
Gold medal – first place	1995 Athens, Georgia	Team
Bronze medal – third place	1996 Tuscaloosa, Alabama	Team

Sandy Woolsey (born August 15, 1972 in Denver, Colorado) is an American former artistic gymnast. She went to high school at Marcos de Niza in Tempe Arizona.

Woolsey was coached at Desert Devils in Tempe, Arizona. At the US National Championships in 1989, she took third place in the all-around competition. Later that year she was a member of the US team that competed at the 1989 World Artistic Gymnastics Championships in Stuttgart, Germany. In the team final, where the US took fourth place, Woolsey was the highest-scoring US gymnast. In the all-around competition, she came in eighth. She also qualified to the uneven bars final, where she placed seventh.

Woolsey continued to compete internationally for the US in 1990 and 1991. At the US National Championships in 1991 she took second place in the all-around competition, but after finishing seventh in the team trials for the 1991 World Championships, was not selected for the US team. She retired from elite competition later that year.

Woolsey competed for the University of Utah gymnastics team between 1993 and 1996. The team won the NCAA Women's Gymnastics championship in 1994 and 1995.

In an interview she gave in 2014 at the time of her induction into Utah's Crimson Club Hall of Fame, Woolsey said that she had been working as a park ranger in Colorado.

In March 2023 Woolsey was interviewed by Nicole Langevin for the podcast What Makes You Think . . . In the interview, Woolsey talked in detail about her career as an elite and college gymnast, her perceptions of the selection process for the US national team between 1989 and 1992, and the culture of restricted eating in gymnastics at that time.
