= NCAA women's gymnastics tournament =

Gymnastics tournament

- Association: NCAA
- Sport: College gymnastics
- Founded: 1982; 44 years ago
- Division: Division I, Division II, and Division III
- No. of teams: 36
- Country: United States
- Most recent champion: Oklahoma (8th title)
- Most titles: Georgia (10)
- Website: NCAA.com

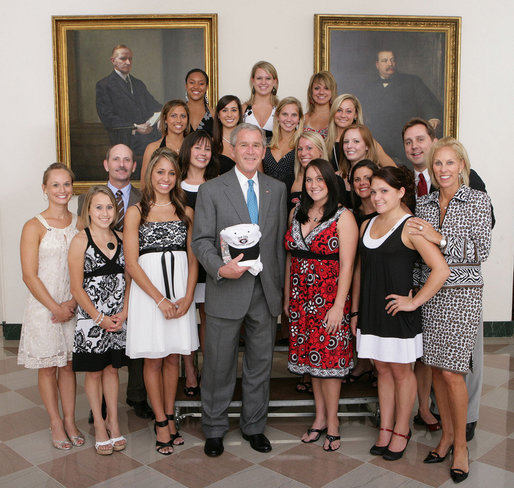
The University of Georgia Gym Dogs, including individual apparatus national champions Courtney McCool and Grace Taylor, are honored at the White House by President of the United States George W. Bush for their winning the 2008 Division I team national championship.

The NCAA women's gymnastics tournament is an annual competition that is sponsored by the National Collegiate Athletic Association (NCAA) to determine the team as well individual national champions of women's collegiate gymnastics among its member programs in the United States. Unlike most other NCAA-sponsored sports, the women's gymnastics championship is not separated into divisions and uses a single National Collegiate tournament instead.

== History ==
The NCAA introduced women's gymnastics as a championship sport in 1982. Gymnastics was one of twelve women's sports added to the NCAA championship program for the 1981–82 school year, as the NCAA engaged in battle with the Association for Intercollegiate Athletics for Women for sole governance of women's collegiate sports. The AIAW continued to conduct its established championship program in the same twelve (and other) sports; however, after a year of dual women's championships, the NCAA conquered the AIAW and usurped its authority and membership.

Under the NCAA, only seven universities have claimed the overall Division I (pre-1987) or National Collegiate (1987–present) championship; the Division II competition was discontinued in 1987. During the early years of competition, the University of Utah, under the leadership of head coach Greg Marsden, dominated the field of competition. During the late 1980s and 1990s, the University of Georgia (UGA), coached by Suzanne Yoculan, and the University of Alabama, coached by Sarah Patterson, gained success and claimed several titles. From 1996 to 2012, the University of Alabama, the University of Georgia, and UCLA, coached by Valorie Kondos Field, claimed all NCAA titles; four titles for the University of Alabama, six for UCLA and seven for the University of Georgia. The newest edition being LSU joining the exclusive list as the most recent first-time champion in 2024.

In 2013, the University of Florida, coached by Rhonda Faehn, broke the reign of the prior four teams, winning the NCAA tournament held at UCLA's newly renovated Pauley Pavilion in Los Angeles, California. Faehn was a competitor for the Bruins 1990–1992. The University of Oklahoma, coached by K. J. Kindler, became the sixth team to win the NCAA title after tying with Florida in 2014. In 2021, the University of Michigan, coached by Bev Plocki, became the seventh team to win the NCAA title. In 2024, LSU, coached by Jay Clark, became the eighth team to win the NCAA title.

== Results ==
=== Team champions ===
Year	Winner	Score	Finalists	Semi finalists
1982	Utah	148.60	Cal State Fullerton, 144.15; Penn State, 143.10; Oregon State, 143.00; Arizona State, 142.95; UCLA, 142.40; Florida, 140.90; Nebraska, 138.10; Oklahoma State, 137.20; Michigan, 136.90	—N/a
1983	Utah	184.65	Arizona State, 183.30; Cal State Fullerton, 179.25; Alabama, 179.05; Florida, 177.85 (tie) UCLA and LSU, 177.80; Ohio State, 176.65; Oregon State, 173.55; Nebraska, 165.55	—N/a
1984	Utah	186.05	UCLA, 185.55; Cal State Fullerton, 183.9; Arizona State, 183.65; Florida, 182.2; Alabama, 180.8; Penn State, 179.45; Washington, 178.55; Georgia, 177.6; Arizona, 176.9	—N/a
1985	Utah	188.35	Arizona State, 186.6; Florida, 184.3; Alabama, 184.05; Cal State Fullerton, 183.5; Oregon State, 183.15; Georgia, 180.9; Ohio State, 179.75; Penn State, 179.0; Oklahoma, 177.4	—N/a
1986	Utah	186.95	Arizona State, 186.70; Alabama, 186.35; Georgia, 185.45; Cal State Fullerton, 185.00; Penn State, 182.70; UCLA, 181.70; Florida, 181.30; LSU, 180.55; Ohio State, 177.80	—N/a
1987	Georgia	187.90	Utah, 187.55; UCLA, 187.00; Alabama, 186.60; Arizona State, 184.00; Florida, 183.80; LSU, 181.50; Ohio State, 180.20; Washington, 179.85; Nebraska, 179.50; Arizona, 179.45; Oregon State, 174.50	—N/a
1988	Alabama	190.05	Utah, 189.50; UCLA, 188.80; LSU, 187.90; Georgia, 186.80; Florida, 186.65; Oregon State, 186.50; Arizona State, 185.10; Arizona, 184.00; Nebraska, 183.55; Penn State, 179.70; Michigan State, 178.80	—N/a
1989	Georgia	192.65	UCLA, 192.60; Alabama, 192.10; Nebraska, 190.80; Utah, 190.20; Cal State Fullerton, 189.45 (tie) Arizona State and Oregon State, 187.90; Oklahoma, 187.05; Florida, 187.00; Arizona, 186.50; Ohio State, 186.40	—N/a
1990	Utah	194.900	Alabama, 194.575; Georgia, 193.225; UCLA, 193.100; Nebraska, 192.225; LSU, 192.100; Oregon State, 189.950; Cal State Fullerton, 189.700; Towson, 187.975 (tie) Arizona and Florida, 187.175; Ohio State, 183.650	—N/a
1991	Alabama	195.125	Utah, 194.375; Georgia, 193.375; Oregon State, 192.350; Penn State, 190.950; Florida, 189.700; LSU, 188.600; Brigham Young, 187.700 (tie) Arizona State and Auburn, 187.650; Arizona, 187.475; Utah State, 185.950	—N/a
1992	Utah	195.650	Georgia, 194.600; Alabama, 193.350; Penn State, 192.775; Arizona, 191.950; Oregon State, 191.375; Arizona State, 191.025; California, 190.725; UCLA, 189.825; Stanford, 189.100; Florida, 188.725; Brigham Young, 187.775	—N/a
1993	Georgia	198.000	Alabama, 196.825; Utah, 195.825; UCLA, 194.925; Auburn, 194.725; Arizona, 194.075	(tie) LSU and Oregon State, 193.425; Michigan, 193.125; Florida, 192.950; Penn State, 192.700; Arizona State, 192.175
1994	Utah	196.400	Alabama, 196.350; Georgia, 195.850; Michigan, 195.150; UCLA, 194.975; Florida, 194.850	Oregon State, 193.625; LSU, 193.225; Brigham Young, 192.325; Arizona State, 190.825; Washington, 190.525; New Hampshire, 188.450
1995	Utah	196.650	(tie) Alabama and Michigan, 196.425; UCLA, 196.150; Georgia, 196.075; Oregon State, 194.850	Florida, 195.425; Penn State, 194.150; LSU, 193.025; Brigham Young, 191.925; Nebraska, 191.750; West Virginia, 189.650
1996	Alabama	198.025	UCLA, 197.475 (tie) Georgia and Utah, 196.775; Oregon State, 196.525; Michigan, 196.375	Arizona, 195.125; Florida, 194.825; Stanford, 194.025; Nebraska, 193.950; Penn State, 192.700; Brigham Young, 192.500
1997	UCLA	197.150	Arizona State, 196.850; Georgia, 196.600; Michigan, 196.500; Florida, 196.425; Nebraska, 195.250	Utah, 196.025; Washington, 195.975; Alabama, 195.600; Minnesota, 194.775; Penn State, 194.300; LSU, 193.825
1998	Georgia	197.725	Florida, 196.350; Alabama, 196.300; Utah, 196.025; UCLA, 195.750; Arizona State, 195.450	Washington, 195.450; Michigan, 195.425; LSU, 195.300; Penn State, 194.625; North Carolina State, 194.125; Brigham Young, 193.400
1999	Georgia	196.850	Michigan, 196.550; Alabama, 195.950; Arizona State, 195.900; UCLA, 195.850; Nebraska, 194.800	Utah, 195.475; Penn State, 194.775; LSU, 194.475 (tie) Florida and Stanford, 194.000; West Virginia, 191.850
2000	UCLA	197.300	Utah, 196.875; Georgia, 196.800; Nebraska, 196.725; Alabama, 196.500; Michigan, 195.725	Penn State, 195.350; Iowa State, 195.325; LSU, 194.950; Oregon State, 194.750; Brigham Young, 194.500; West Virginia, 194.175
2001	UCLA	197.575	Georgia, 197.400; Michigan, 197.275; Alabama, 196.550 (tie) Nebraska and Utah 196.025	Florida, 195.825; Stanford, 195.400; Arizona State, 194.775; Oklahoma, 193.875; Oregon State, 193.775; Denver, 193.625
2002	Alabama	197.575	Georgia, 197.250; UCLA, 197.150; Utah, 196.950; Nebraska, 196.425; Stanford, 196.025	Michigan, 196.175; LSU, 195.850; Minnesota, 195.700; Florida, 195.675; Arizona, 194.975; Oregon State, 192.925
2003	UCLA	197.825	Alabama, 197.275; Georgia, 197.150; Nebraska, 197.125; Michigan, 196.050; Utah, 195.300	Florida, 196.325; Stanford, 196.200; Arizona State, 194.225; LSU, 194.000; Iowa, 193.825; Auburn, 193.525
2004	UCLA	198.125	Georgia, 197.200 (tie) Alabama and Stanford, 197.125; Florida, 196.800; Utah, 195.775	LSU, 196.650; Michigan, 196.500; Arizona State, 196.325; Nebraska, 196.150; Oklahoma, 195.750; Iowa, 194.775
2005	Georgia	197.825	Alabama, 197.400; Utah, 197.275; UCLA, 197.150; Michigan, 196.575; Nebraska, 196.425	Florida, 196.225; Iowa State, 195.975; LSU, 195.800; Penn State, 194.975; Brigham Young, 194.625; Oklahoma, 194.425
2006	Georgia	197.750	Utah, 196.800; Alabama, 196.725; Florida, 196.275; Nebraska, 196.175; Iowa State, 194.725	Michigan, 196.00; LSU, 195.650; Arizona State, 195.575; Oklahoma, 195.525; Oregon State, 195.150; Arkansas, 194.375
2007	Georgia	197.850	Utah, 197.250; Florida, 197.225; UCLA, 196.925; Stanford, 196.825; Nebraska, 195.975	LSU, 196.275; Oklahoma, 196.250; Alabama, 196.125; Oregon State, 195.100; Denver, 195.575; Michigan, 195.100
2008	Georgia	197.450	Utah, 197.125; Stanford, 196.750; Florida, 196.700; LSU, 196.350; Alabama, 196.125	UCLA, 196.725 (tie) Michigan and Oklahoma, 196.075; Arkansas, 195.825; Oregon State, 195.475; Denver, 194.200
2009	Georgia	197.825	Alabama, 197.575; Utah, 197.425; Florida, 196.725; Arkansas, 196.475; LSU, 196.375	UCLA, 196.625; Stanford, 196.225; Penn State, 196.100; Oklahoma, 195.825; Oregon State, 195.350; Illinois, 195.050
2010	UCLA	197.725	Oklahoma, 197.250; Alabama, 197.225; Stanford, 197.100; Florida, 197.000; Utah, 196.225	Nebraska, 196.175; Oregon State, 196.050; LSU, 196.025; Michigan, 195.700; Arkansas, 195.600; Missouri, 194.600
2011	Alabama	197.650	UCLA, 197.375; Oklahoma, 197.250; Nebraska, 196.725; Utah, 196.500; Michigan, 196.425	Florida, 196.125; Oregon State, 196.100; Arkansas, 195.450; Georgia, 195.450; Illinois, 195.100; Kent State, 195.000
2012	Alabama	197.850	Florida, 197.775; UCLA, 197.750; Stanford, 197.500; Utah, 197.375; Arkansas, 196.300	Oklahoma, 196.925; Nebraska, 196.625; LSU, 196.550; Ohio State, 196.525; Georgia, 196.500; Oregon State, 196.450
2013	Florida	197.575	Oklahoma, 197.375; Alabama, 197.350; UCLA, 197.100; LSU, 197.050; Georgia, 196.675	Michigan, 196.850; Minnesota, 196.375; Utah, 196.200; Arkansas, 196.150; Illinois, 195.700; Stanford, 194.700
2014	Florida Oklahoma	198.175	LSU, 197.600; Alabama, 197.550; Georgia, 197.100; Nebraska, 196.500	UCLA, 197.050; Utah, 197.025; Stanford, 196.600; Michigan, 196.425; Illinois, 195.800; Penn State, 194.825
2015	Florida	197.850	Utah, 197.800; Oklahoma, 197.525; Alabama, 197.275; Stanford, 197.250; Auburn, 195.625	Michigan, 197.025; Nebraska, 196.675; Georgia, 196.600; LSU, 196.550; UCLA, 196.400; Oregon State, 195.875
2016	Oklahoma	197.6750	LSU, 197.4500; Alabama, 197.4375; Florida, 197.3500; UCLA, 196.8250; Georgia, 196.8125	California, 195.8500; Nebraska, 195.7750; Utah, 195.7625; Stanford, 195.5750; Auburn, 195.1000; Minnesota, 194.9875
2017	Oklahoma	198.3875	LSU, 197.7375; Florida, 197.7000; UCLA, 197.2625; Utah, 196.5875; Alabama, 196.0000	Nebraska, 197.2125; Washington, 196.5625; Denver, 196.4750; Michigan, 196.4625; Oregon State, 196.3625; Georgia, 195.8000
2018	UCLA	198.075	Oklahoma, 198.0375; Florida, 197.850; LSU, 197.8375; Utah, 196.900; Nebraska, 196.800	Georgia, 196.6875; Alabama, 196.6250; California, 196.500; Arkansas, 196.425; Washington, 196.250; Kentucky, 196.0625
2019	Oklahoma	198.3375	LSU, 197.8250; UCLA, 197.5375; Denver, 197.0000	Michigan, 197.2000; Oregon State, 196.9000; Utah, 196.7250; Georgia, 196.4625
~~2020~~	Cancelled due to COVID-19 pandemic			
2021	Michigan	198.2500	Oklahoma, 198.1625; Utah, 197.9875; Florida, 197.1375	Alabama, 197.5750; LSU, 197.5625; California, 197.3625; Minnesota, 197.1875
2022	Oklahoma	198.2000	Florida, 198.0875; Utah, 197.7500; Auburn, 197.3500	Missouri, 197.2000; Minnesota, 197.1125; Alabama, 197.1000; Michigan, 196.2875
2023	Oklahoma	198.3875	Florida, 198.2375; Utah, 197.9375; LSU, 197.5250	UCLA, 197.9125; Kentucky, 197.1250; California, 196.9125; Denver, 196.5000
2024	LSU	198.2250	California, 197.8500; Utah, 197.8000; Florida, 197.4375	Stanford, 197.0750; Oklahoma, 196.6625; Arkansas, 196.4750; Alabama, 195.4125
2025	Oklahoma	198.0125	UCLA, 197.6125; Missouri, 197.2500; Utah, 197.2375	LSU, 197.5250; Michigan State, 197.3625; Florida, 197.2000; Alabama, 196.8250
2026	Oklahoma	198.1625	LSU, 198.0750; Florida, 197.6875; Minnesota, 197.3750	UCLA, 197.2750; Georgia, 197.2625; Arkansas, 196.9625; Stanford, 196.9375

=== Individual champions ===
Year	All-Around	Vault	Uneven Bars	Balance Beam	Floor Exercise
1982	Sue Stednitz (Utah)	Elaine Alfano (Utah)	Lisa Shirk (Pittsburgh)	Sue Stednitz (Utah)	Mary Ayotte-Law (Oregon State)
1983	Megan McCunniff (Utah)	Elaine Alfano (Utah)	Jeri Cameron (Arizona State)	Julie Goewey (Cal State Fullerton)	Kim Neal (Arizona State)
1984	Megan Marsden (Utah)	Megan Marsden (Utah)	Jackie Brummer (Arizona State)	Heidi Anderson (Oregon State)	Maria Anz (Florida)
1985	Penney Hauschild (Alabama)	Elaine Alfano (Utah)	Penney Hauschild (Alabama)	Lisa Zeis (Arizona State)	Lisa Mitzel (Utah)
1986	Jackie Brummer (Arizona State) Penney Hauschild (Alabama)	Pam Loree (Penn State) Kim Neal (Arizona State)	Lucy Wener (Georgia)	Jackie Brummer (Arizona State)	Penney Hauschild (Alabama) Lisa Zeis (Arizona State)
1987	Kelly Garrison (Oklahoma)	Yumi Mordre (Washington)	Lucy Wener (Georgia)	Yumi Mordre (Washington)	Kim Hamilton (UCLA)
1988	Kelly Garrison (Oklahoma)	Jill Andrews (UCLA)	Kelly Garrison (Oklahoma)	Kelly Garrison (Oklahoma)	Kim Hamilton (UCLA)
1989	Corrinne Wright (Georgia)	Kim Hamilton (UCLA)	Lucy Wener (Georgia)	Jill Andrews (UCLA) Joy Selig (Oregon State)	Kim Hamilton (UCLA) Corrinne Wright (Georgia)
1990	Dee Dee Foster (Alabama)	Michele Bryant (Nebraska)	Marie Roethlisberger (Minnesota)	Joy Selig (Oregon State)	Joy Selig (Oregon State)
1991	Hope Spivey (Georgia)	Anna Basaldua (Arizona) Hope Spivey (Georgia)	Kelly Macy (Georgia)	Gina Basile (Alabama) Missy Marlowe (Utah)	Hope Spivey (Georgia)
1992	Missy Marlowe (Utah)	Kristen Kenoyer (Utah) Tammy Marshall (Massachusetts) Heather Stepp (Georgia)	Missy Marlowe (Utah)	Dana Dobransky (Alabama) Missy Marlowe (Utah)	Missy Marlowe (Utah)
1993	Jenny Hansen (Kentucky)	Heather Stepp (Georgia)	Agina Simpkins (Georgia) Beth Wymer (Michigan)	Dana Dobransky (Alabama)	Amy Durham (Oregon State) Tammy Marshall (Massachusetts) Heather Stepp (Georgia)
1994	Jenny Hansen (Kentucky)	Jenny Hansen (Kentucky)	Lori Strong (Georgia) Sandy Woolsey (Utah) Beth Wymer (Michigan)	Jenny Hansen (Kentucky)	Hope Spivey (Georgia)
1995	Jenny Hansen (Kentucky)	Jenny Hansen (Kentucky)	Beth Wymer (Michigan)	Jenny Hansen (Kentucky)	Leslie Angeles (Georgia) Jenny Hansen (Kentucky) Stella Umeh (UCLA)
1996	Meredith Willard (Alabama)	Leah Brown (Georgia)	Stephanie Woods (Alabama)	Summer Reid (Utah)	Heidi Hornbeek (Arizona) Kim Kelly (Alabama)
1997	Kim Arnold (Georgia)	Susan Hines (Florida)	Jenni Beathard (Georgia)	Elizabeth Reid (Arizona State) Summer Reid (Utah)	Leah Brown (Georgia)
1998	Kim Arnold (Georgia)	Larissa Fontaine (Stanford) Susan Hines (Florida)	Heidi Moneymaker (UCLA)	Kim Arnold (Georgia) Jenni Beathard (Georgia) Betsy Hamm (Florida)	Karin Lichey (Georgia) Stella Umeh (UCLA)
1999	Theresa Kulikowski (Utah)	Heidi Moneymaker (UCLA)	Angie Leonard (Utah)	Kiralee Hayashi (UCLA) Theresa Kulikowski (Utah) Andree Pickens (Alabama)	Marny Oestreng (Bowling Green)
2000	Heather Brink (Nebraska)	Heather Brink (Nebraska)	Mohini Bhardwaj (UCLA)	Lena Degteva (UCLA)	Suzanne Sears (Georgia)
2001	Onnie Willis (UCLA) Elise Ray (Michigan)	Cory Fritzinger (Georgia)	Yvonne Tousek (UCLA)	Theresa Kulikowski (Utah)	Mohini Bhardwaj (UCLA)
2002	Jamie Dantzscher (UCLA)	Jamie Dantzscher (UCLA)	Andree Pickens (Alabama)	Elise Ray (Michigan)	Jamie Dantzscher (UCLA) Nicole Arnstad (LSU)
2003	Richelle Simpson (Nebraska)	Ashley Miles (Alabama)	Jamie Dantzscher (UCLA) Kate Richardson (UCLA)	Kate Richardson (UCLA)	Richelle Simpson (Nebraska)
2004	Jeana Rice (Alabama)	Ashley Miles (Alabama)	Elise Ray (Michigan)	Ashley Kelly (Arizona State)	Ashley Miles (Alabama) Courtney Bumpers (North Carolina)
2005	Tasha Schwikert (UCLA)	Kristen Maloney (UCLA)	Terin Humphrey (Alabama)	Kristen Maloney (UCLA)	Courtney Bumpers (North Carolina)
2006	Courtney Kupets (Georgia)	Ashley Miles (Alabama)	Courtney Kupets (Georgia) Kristina Baskett (Utah)	Courtney Kupets (Georgia) April Burkholder (LSU)	Kate Richardson (UCLA)
2007	Courtney Kupets (Georgia)	Courtney Kupets (Georgia)	Terin Humphrey (Alabama)	Ashley Postell (Utah)	Morgan Dennis (Alabama)
2008	Tasha Schwikert (UCLA)	Susan Jackson (LSU)	Tasha Schwikert (UCLA)	Grace Taylor (Georgia)	Courtney McCool (Georgia)
2009	Courtney Kupets (Georgia)	Ashleigh Clare-Kearney (LSU)	Courtney Kupets (Georgia)	Courtney Kupets (Georgia)	Courtney Kupets (Georgia) Ashleigh Clare-Kearney (LSU)
2010	Susan Jackson (LSU)	Vanessa Zamarripa (UCLA)	Carly Janiga (Stanford)	Susan Jackson (LSU)	Brittani McCullough (UCLA)
2011	Kylee Botterman (Michigan)	Marissa King (Florida)	Kat Ding (Georgia)	Samantha Peszek (UCLA)	Geralen Stack-Eaton (Alabama)
2012	Kytra Hunter (Florida)	Kytra Hunter (Florida)	Kat Ding (Georgia)	Geralen Stack-Eaton (Alabama)	Kat Ding (Georgia)
2013	Bridget Sloan (Florida)	Diandra Milliner (Alabama) Rheagan Courville (LSU)	Alaina Johnson (Florida)	Bridget Sloan (Florida)	Joanna Sampson (Michigan)
2014	Kim Jacob (Alabama)	Katherine Grable (Arkansas) Rheagan Courville (LSU)	Bridget Sloan (Florida)	Taylor Spears (Oklahoma)	Katherine Grable (Arkansas)
2015	Samantha Peszek (UCLA) Kytra Hunter (Florida)	Elizabeth Price (Stanford)	Georgia Dabritz (Utah)	Samantha Peszek (UCLA)	Kytra Hunter (Florida)
2016	Bridget Sloan (Florida)	Brandie Jay (Georgia) Katie Bailey (Alabama)	Brittany Rogers (Georgia) Bridget Sloan (Florida)	Danusia Francis (UCLA) Bridget Sloan (Florida)	Nina McGee (Denver)
2017	Alex McMurtry (Florida)	Kennedi Edney (LSU)	Alex McMurtry (Florida) Katie Bailey (Alabama) Sarah Finnegan (LSU) Kyla Ross (UCLA) Nicole Lehrmann (Oklahoma) Maggie Nichols (Oklahoma)	Kyla Ross (UCLA)	Ashleigh Gnat (LSU) MyKayla Skinner (Utah)
2018	Maggie Nichols (Oklahoma)	Brenna Dowell (Oklahoma) MyKayla Skinner (Utah) Alex McMurtry (Florida)	Elizabeth Price (Stanford) Maggie Nichols (Oklahoma)	Peng-Peng Lee (UCLA)	Katelyn Ohashi (UCLA) Maggie Nichols (Oklahoma)
2019	Maggie Nichols (Oklahoma)	Maggie Nichols (Oklahoma) Kyla Ross (UCLA) Kennedi Edney (LSU) Derrian Gobourne (Auburn)	Sarah Finnegan (LSU)	Natalie Wojcik (Michigan)	Kyla Ross (UCLA) Alicia Boren (Florida) Lynnzee Brown (Denver) Brenna Dowell (Oklahoma)
~~2020~~	Cancelled due to the COVID-19 pandemic in the United States				
2021	Anastasia Webb (Oklahoma)	Anastasia Webb (Oklahoma) Haleigh Bryant (LSU)	Maile O'Keefe (Utah) Maya Bordas (California)	Luisa Blanco (Alabama)	Anastasia Webb (Oklahoma) Lexi Graber (Alabama) Maile O'Keefe (Utah)
2022	Trinity Thomas (Florida)	Jaedyn Rucker (Utah)	Trinity Thomas (Florida)	Sunisa Lee (Auburn)	Trinity Thomas (Florida)
2023	Maile O'Keefe (Utah)	Olivia Trautman (Oklahoma)	Jordan Chiles (UCLA)	Maile O'Keefe (Utah)	Jordan Chiles (UCLA)
2024	Haleigh Bryant (LSU)	Anna Roberts (Stanford)	Audrey Davis (Oklahoma) Leanne Wong (Florida)	Audrey Davis (Oklahoma) Faith Torrez (Oklahoma)	Aleah Finnegan (LSU)
2025	Jordan Bowers (Oklahoma)	Kailin Chio (LSU)	Jordan Chiles (UCLA)	Helen Hu (Missouri)	Brooklyn Moors (UCLA)
2026	Faith Torrez (Oklahoma)	Keira Wells (Oklahoma)	Riley McCusker (Florida)	Brooklyn Rowray (Minnesota)	Jordan Chiles (UCLA)

== Champions ==
=== Team titles ===
Schools that have won the NCAA Championship
10, 9, 8, 7, 6, 3, 1

Team	#	Years
Georgia	10	1987, 1989, 1993, 1998, 1999, 2005, 2006, 2007, 2008, 2009
Utah	9	1982, 1983, 1984, 1985, 1986, 1990, 1992, 1994, 1995
Oklahoma	8	2014, 2016, 2017, 2019, 2022, 2023, 2025, 2026
UCLA	7	1997, 2000, 2001, 2003, 2004, 2010, 2018
Alabama	6	1988, 1991, 1996, 2002, 2011, 2012
Florida	3	2013, 2014, 2015
LSU	1	2024
Michigan	1	2021

=== Individual champions ===
School	Total	All-Around	Vault	Uneven Bars	Balance Beam	Floor Exercise
UCLA	45	5	7	9	10	14
Georgia	41	7	7	12	4	11
Utah	30	5	7	6	8	4
Alabama	29	6	5	6	6	6
Florida	24	6	5	6	3	4
Oklahoma	21	6	3	5	4	3
LSU	18	2	8	2	2	4
Arizona State	10	1	1	2	4	2
Michigan	9	2	-	4	2	1
Kentucky	8	3	2	-	2	1
Oregon State	6	-	-	-	3	3
Nebraska	5	2	2	-	-	1
Stanford	5	-	3	2	-	-
Arizona	2	-	1	-	-	1
Arkansas	2	-	1	-	-	1
Denver	2	-	-	-	-	2
UMass	2	-	1	-	-	1
North Carolina	2	-	-	-	-	2
Washington	2	-	1	-	1	-
Auburn	2	-	1	-	1	-
Bowling Green	1	-	-	-	-	1
Cal State Fullerton	1	-	-	-	1	-
California	1	-	-	1	-	-
Minnesota	2	-	-	1	1	-
Penn State	1	-	1	-	-	-
Missouri	1	-	-	-	1	-

==== Multi-event winners ====
Name	School	Events					Total	
Name	School	All-Around	Vault	Uneven Bars	Balance Beam	Floor Exercise	Events (Note: Total number of events the gymnast won a title on)	Titles (Note: Total number of individual titles the gymnast won)
Sue Stednitz	Utah	1982			1982		2	2
Megan Marsden	Utah	1984	1984				2	2
Penney Hauschild	Alabama	1985, 1986		1985		1986	3	4
Jackie Brummer	Arizona State	1986		1984	1986		3	3
Kim Neal	Arizona State		1986			1983	2	2
Lisa Zeis	Arizona State				1985	1986	2	2
Yumi Mordre	Washington		1987		1987		2	2
Kelly Garrison	Oklahoma	1987, 1988		1988	1988		3	4
Corrinne Wright	Georgia	1989				1989	2	2
Kim Hamilton	UCLA		1989			1987, 1988, 1989	2	4
Joy Selig	Oregon State				1989, 1990	1989, 1990	2	4
Hope Spivey	Georgia	1991	1991			1991	3	3
Missy Marlowe	Utah	1992		1992	1991, 1992	1992	4	5
Tammy Marshall	Massachusetts		1992			1993	2	2
Heather Stepp	Georgia		1992, 1993			1993	2	3
Jenny Hansen	Kentucky	1993, 1994, 1995	1994, 1995		1994, 1995	1995	4	8
Leah Brown	Georgia		1996			1997	2	2
Kim Arnold	Georgia	1997, 1998			1998		2	3
Theresa Kulikowski	Utah	1999			1999, 2001		2	3
Heather Brink	Nebraska	2000	2000				2	2
Jamie Dantzscher	UCLA	2002	2002	2003		2002	4	4
Elise Ray	Michigan	2001		2004	2002		3	3
Andree Pickens	Alabama			2002	1999		2	2
Richelle Simpson	Nebraska	2003				2003	2	2
Ashley Miles	Alabama		2003, 2004, 2006			2004	2	4
Kristen Maloney	UCLA		2005		2005		2	2
Courtney Kupets	Georgia	2006, 2007, 2009	2007	2006, 2009	2006, 2009	2009	5	9
Tasha Schwikert	UCLA	2008		2008			2	2
Ashleigh Clare-Kearney	LSU		2009			2009	2	2
Susan Jackson	LSU	2010	2008		2010		3	3
Kytra Hunter	Florida	2012, 2015	2012			2015	3	4
Kat Ding	Georgia			2011, 2012		2012	2	3
Bridget Sloan	Florida	2013, 2016		2014, 2016	2013, 2016		2	6
Katherine Grable	Arkansas		2014			2014	2	2
Samantha Peszek	UCLA	2015			2011, 2015		2	3
Alex McMurtry	Florida	2017	2018	2017			3	3
Katie Bailey	Alabama		2016	2017			2	2
Kyla Ross	UCLA		2019	2017	2017	2019	4	4
Maggie Nichols	Oklahoma	2018, 2019	2019	2017, 2018		2018	4	6
MyKayla Skinner	Utah		2018			2017	2	2
Elizabeth Price	Stanford		2015	2018			2	2
Brenna Dowell	Oklahoma		2018			2019	2	2
Anastasia Webb	Oklahoma	2021	2021			2021	3	3
Maile O'Keefe	Utah	2023		2021	2023	2021	4	4
Trinity Thomas	Florida	2022		2022		2022	3	3
Jordan Chiles	UCLA			2023, 2025		2023, 2026	2	4
Haleigh Bryant	LSU	2024	2021				2	2
Audrey Davis	Oklahoma			2024	2024		2	2
Faith Torrez	Oklahoma	2026			2024		2	2

== Gym Slam ==
A Gym Slam (which is sometimes spelled as GymSlam) is the accomplishment of scoring a perfect 10.0 on each apparatus. It has been done by only 15 women in NCAA gymnastics have achieved this feat, 4 have achieved it at least twice, and Trinity Thomas is the only gymnast to date to have achieved this feat more than twice, completing it a total of 5 times in her career.

Gymnast	College	VT	UB	BB	FX	Year Accomplished
Missy Marlowe	Utah	March 2, 1992	February 11, 1991	February 7, 1992	March 9, 1992	1992
Heather Stepp	Georgia	February 14, 1992	February 12, 1993	February 6, 1993	February 6, 1993	1993
Kristen Kenoyer	Utah	February 19, 1993	March 20, 1993	March 9, 1992	February 13, 1993	1993
Karin Lichey	Georgia	February 11, 1996	February 23, 1996	February 23, 1996	February 23, 1996	1996
Ashley Kelly	Arizona State	March 21, 2003	March 21, 2003	March 5, 2004	February 27, 2004	2004
Kristen Maloney	UCLA	April 3, 2004	March 6, 2005	February 16, 2001	March 4, 2001	2005
Courtney Kupets	Georgia	April 4, 2009	February 10, 2007	January 23, 2009	February 28, 2009	2009
Bridget Sloan	Florida	January 11, 2015	March 13, 2015	February 7, 2014	January 24, 2014	2015
Maggie Nichols	Oklahoma	January 21, 2017	March 4, 2017	February 3, 2017	February 10, 2017	2017
Maggie Nichols	Oklahoma	March 18, 2017	April 20, 2018	February 17, 2017	March 18, 2018	2018
Alex McMurtry	Florida	January 16, 2015	January 29, 2016	January 26, 2018	February 24, 2017	2018
Kyla Ross	UCLA	February 10, 2019	January 28, 2017	February 20, 2017	March 16, 2019	2019
Kyla Ross	UCLA	February 16, 2019	February 18, 2017	March 18, 2017	March 23, 2019	2019
Trinity Thomas	Florida	January 16, 2022	January 24, 2020	February 7, 2020	March 7, 2020	2022
Trinity Thomas	Florida	March 4, 2022	February 26, 2021	February 14, 2020	February 12, 2021	2022
Trinity Thomas	Florida	April 2, 2022	April 2, 2021	January 28, 2022	February 26, 2021	2022
Trinity Thomas	Florida	January 27, 2023	March 31, 2022	January 6, 2023	January 16, 2022	2023
Trinity Thomas	Florida	April 15, 2023	March 18, 2023	February 10, 2023	February 18, 2022	2023
Jade Carey	Oregon State	January 14, 2023	February 5, 2022	March 4, 2023	February 13, 2022	2023
Jade Carey	Oregon State	February 18, 2023	February 24, 2023	March 15, 2025	February 25, 2022	2025
Haleigh Bryant	LSU	March 5, 2021	March 10, 2023	February 9, 2024	March 10, 2023	2024
Leanne Wong	Florida	April 2, 2022	January 28, 2022	January 13, 2023	February 23, 2024	2024

== See also ==
- NCAA Men's Gymnastics championship
- AIAW Intercollegiate Women's Gymnastics champions
- NAIA Women's Gymnastics Championships
- East Atlantic Gymnastics League
- List of gymnastics terms
