= Dana Duckworth =

Biographical details
- Born: 1971 (age 54–55); Sterling Heights, Michigan
- Education: University of Alabama

Playing career
- 1990–1993: Alabama

Coaching career (HC unless noted)
- 2000–2014: Alabama (Asst.)
- 2014–2022: Alabama

Head coaching record
- Overall: 10-3

Accomplishments and honors

Championships
- NCAA Team Gymnastics (1991); NCAA Balance Beam (1992, 1993); SEC Team Gymnastics (1990); SEC Balance Beam (1992, 1993)

Awards
- All-American (1990, 1991, 1992, 1993)

Dana Duckworth (born c. 1971), née Dana Dobransky, is an American former college gymnastics coach and former college gymnast. She was the head coach of the Alabama Crimson Tide women's gymnastics team of the University of Alabama until May 2022, having succeeded Sarah Patterson in July 2014. Duckworth previously served as an assistant coach under Patterson for fifteen years, after having competed for Patterson's Crimson Tide gymnastics team for four years as an undergraduate.

== Early years ==
Duckworth was born to Richard and Judy Dobransky. Judy Dobransky has long been involved with gymnastics coaching. The Dobranskys are a Jewish family.

Duckworth received an athletic scholarship to attend the University of Alabama in Tuscaloosa, where she was a member of coach Sarah Patterson's Alabama Crimson Tide women's gymnastics team in National Collegiate Athletic Association (NCAA) and Southeastern Conference (SEC) competition from 1989 to 1993. Despite suffering a stress fracture in her left leg as a sophomore, she recovered in time to perform as a key member of the Crimson Tide squad that won an NCAA national team championship in 1991. During her four-year college sports career, she earned five All-American accolades, and won the individual SEC conference and NCAA national titles in the balance beam in 1992 and 1993—including a perfect score of 10.0 in the NCAA individual event in 1993. Following her second NCAA title, she was recognized as the NCAA Woman of the Year for the State of Alabama in 1993.

As an undergraduate, Duckworth earned Scholastic All-American honors three times, and CoSIDA Academic All-American accolades twice. She also received an NCAA postgraduate scholarship and a similar award from the SEC, and used the scholarships to attend graduate business school at the University of Alabama and earn her master's degree in business administration (MBA) in 1998.

== Coaching career ==
Duckworth became a full-time assistant coach under the Crimson Tide's long-time head coach Sarah Patterson in 2008, after having served as a volunteer assistant during the previous nine seasons. During her time as Crimson Tide assistant, the program won NCAA national team championships in 2002, 2011 and 2012, as well as SEC conference championships in 2003, 2009 and 2011.

Following the 2013–14 season, Patterson retired after 36 years as the Tide's head coach, and University of Alabama athletic director Bill Battle named Duckworth as Patterson's successor on July 15, 2014. The university's board of trustees approved her five-year contract with an annual base salary of $170,000. Duckworth inherited a highly successful Crimson Tide gymnastics program that has won six national championships in the previous 26 seasons. Her team's first-year schedule as coach included four of the six finalists from the 2014 NCAA national championship tournament, including NCAA co-champions Florida and Oklahoma. The 2014–15 gymnastics season was Duckworth's 20th with the Crimson Tide as a student-athlete, assistant or head coach.

On May 19, 2022, Duckworth stepped down from her position as coach of Alabama.

== Personal ==
Duckworth is married to Joe Duckworth, Jr., a partner in a Tuscaloosa area commercial real estate firm. The Duckworths have two children, a son and a daughter.

== See also ==
- Alabama Crimson Tide
- List of University of Alabama people
