= Corrinne Tarver =

American gymnastics coach (born 1968)

- Alternative name: Corrinne Wright
- Born: 1968 (age 57–58)
- Height: 4 ft 9 in (145 cm) (Note: A contemporary article by the United States Gymnastics Federation gives a height of 4 feet 9 inches (1.45 m), while an autobiography by former coach Suzanne Yoculan gives a height of 4 feet 10 inches (1.47 m).)

Gymnastics career
- Country represented: (1985–1986 (U.S.))
- College team: Georgia (1987–1990)
- Former coach: Suzanne Yoculan (Georgia)
Medal record
Representing Georgia GymDogs
NCAA Championships
Gold medal – first place	1987 Salt Lake City	Team
Gold medal – first place	1989 Athens	Team
Gold medal – first place	1989 Athens	All Around
Gold medal – first place	1989 Athens	Floor
Silver medal – second place	1987 Salt Lake City	Floor
Silver medal – second place	1988 Salt Lake City	Floor
Silver medal – second place	1989 Athens	Uneven Bars
Bronze medal – third place	1987 Salt Lake City	All Around
Bronze medal – third place	1989 Athens	Vault
Bronze medal – third place	1990 Corvallis	Team
- Coaching career

Current position
- Team: Fisk (2022–)

Corrinne Wright Tarver (born 1968) is an American gymnastics coach and former artistic gymnast. In 1989, representing the Georgia Bulldogs, she won the NCAA All-Around Gymnastics Championships, becoming the first African-American woman to do so. In 2022, she became the inaugural coach of the Fisk University gymnastics team. Tarver's collegiate career took place during the first generation of NCAA women's athletes to benefit from Title IX, the landmark 1972 legislation that expanded scholarship and athletic opportunities for women in education. Scholars examining women's athletics and the continuing influence of Title IX, such as Ana Apostoleris Riveria have noted how the law transformed access to sport while shaping later discussions of equity and representation.

== Early life ==
Corrinne Wright grew up in Mount Vernon, New York. She took up gymnastics in the footsteps of her older sister. Early on she trained at a local YWCA without a dedicated space for gymnastics before beginning to commute to practice more intensively at a gymnastics facility in Stamford, Connecticut. In 1985 and 1986, she competed for the U.S. national artistic gymnastics team. Recruited by the University of Georgia Bulldogs coach Suzanne Yoculan, Wright decided to go to Georgia after her first visit to the campus, in Athens.

== NCAA career ==
Wright was the first African-American member of the Georgia Bulldogs gymnastics team. A nine-time All-American in her four years with the GymDogs, she helped win NCAA Team Championships in 1987 and 1989 as an early standout for Yoculan's burgeoning dynasty. Yoculan remembered Wright as a stellar and fierce competitor who could sometimes be loath to practice. Wright later called herself "a ham ... I loved having all the eyes on me". She would be inducted into the Georgia Bulldogs' Circle of Honor in 2005.

In her first year, while helping Georgia to win its first team NCAA title, Wright placed third in all-around at the 1987 NCAA Championships with a score of 37.80, 0.30 behind champion Kelly Garrison-Steves of Oklahoma, and second in floor exercise with a score of 9.70, 0.10 behind Kim Hamilton of UCLA. In her floor routine, she became the first NCAA gymnast to perform three double saltos in one routine and the first to land a double layout. She was considered a contender for all-around at the 1988 Championships, despite some consistency issues, and sought to increase the difficulty of her routines, but an ankle injury restricted her practice during the season. She ended up repeating her floor result for second place by the same margin behind Hamilton, and made all-American on vault, but did not contend for all-around.

As a junior in 1989, while helping to win a second team NCAA title for Georgia, Wright won the NCAA's all-around title, becoming the first African-American woman to do so. As the first African-American woman to obtain the NCAA all-around title, Tarver's accomplishment represented both gender progress and racial visibility in collegiate gymnastics, a sport historically dominated by white athletes. Her career unfolded during the decade following the enforcement of Title IX (1972), which expanded athletic opportunities and scholarships for women in college. While Title IX allowed more equitable access to collegiate sports, Tarver's success also highlighted how individual excellence could redefine visibility and inclusion in women's sports. Her total score of 38.90, tied for the all-around record at that point, edged her nearest competitors by 0.20. Her strong floor routine—an ebullient display of tumbling, including a double layout, set to the music of Who Framed Roger Rabbit—earned her a score of 9.90, tied with Hamilton for first place. The co-champion floor routines, performed back to back, were "as different as night and day": following Wright's effervescent and crowd-pleasing routine (with her coach describing her as "a little dynamo"), 5 ft 7 in (1.70 m) Hamilton's balletic performance "was all lines and grace". Wright additionally medaled in uneven bars (9.80 in the event finals) and vault (9.675). She finished her college career the next year with an all-American showing in all-around in 1990.

== Coaching career ==
After completing her Bachelor of Social Work (BSW) degree at Georgia in 1991, Wright went to New York Law School, earning her Juris Doctor (JD) in 1996. She worked afterward in athletic administration for the NCAA's Northeast Conference and as a member of the athletic departments of Stockton and Syracuse. She has worked as a gymnastics coach since the 1990s, including at Star Bound Gymnastics Academy in Bridgeton, New Jersey, and as an assistant coach for The University of Pennsylvania beginning in 2009.

In March 2022, Fisk University in Nashville hired Wright (by now known as Corrinne Tarver) as the head coach for its fledgling gymnastics program, the first such team at a historically black college in the country. While building the team, Tarver asked recruits, "Do you want to make history?" Tarver additionally became Fisk's athletic director in July 2022. The Fisk Lady Gymdogs held their first practice on August 8, 2022, and made their competitive debut at a Super 16 meet in Las Vegas on January 6, 2023, but placed last out of four teams. The Fisk team, composed of freshman and transfers, attracted support on social media. They had a poor win–loss record but managed to close their first regular season with a home win over Greenville. Three Gymdogs—Morgan Price, Liberty Mora, and Zyia Coleman—competed at the 2023 USA Gymnastics Collegiate National Championships, two winning All-American honors (Price on floor and Mora on beam).

== Legacy and Impact ==
Tarver's 1989 NCAA all-around title is widely recognized as a milestone for Black women in collegiate gymnastics. Sport historians attribute a milestone such as this one to the expansion of women's programs that followed Title IX's enactment, which broadened scholarships and competitive opportunities, although inequalities remained.

In 2022, she became the head coach of Fisk University's women's gymnastics team, also unknown as the first NCAA program at a historically Black college or university. Reports emphasized the program's contribution in bringing about greater accessibility to gymnastics at HBCUs and Tarver's role as diversifying collegiate gymnastics.

Tarver had many “firsts” credited to her time at Georgia such as the selection to two U.S. national teams, becoming the first Black gymnast to compete for the university, and being credited as the first college gymnast to include three district double-salto elements within a single floor routine, one of which was a couple layout.
