= Kim Hamilton (gymnast) =

American former gymnast

Kim Anthony
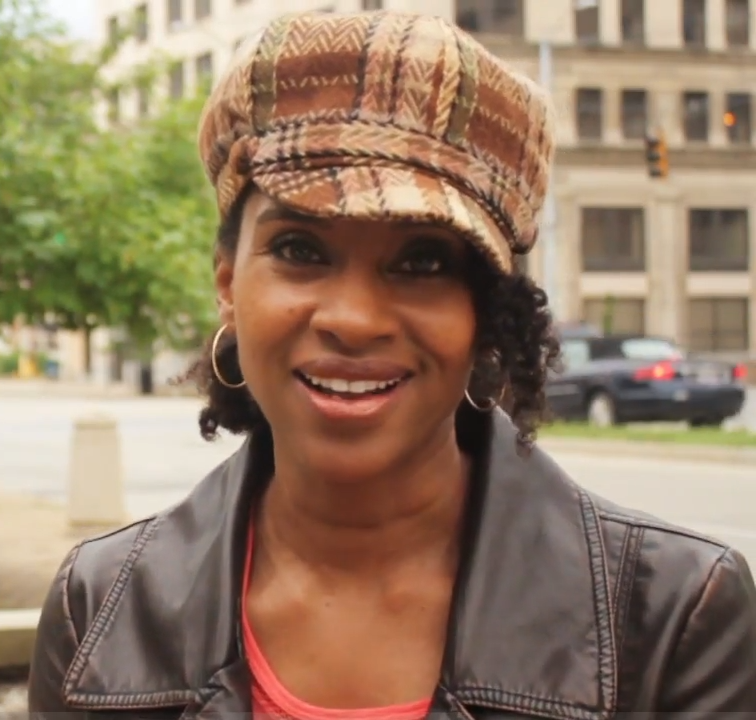
- Anthony in 2014

Personal information
- Alternative name: Kim Hamilton
- Born: 1967 or 1968 (age 58–59) Richmond, Virginia, U.S.
- Height: 5 ft 7 in (170 cm)

Gymnastics career
- College team: UCLA (1987–1990)
Medal record
Representing UCLA Bruins
NCAA Championships
Gold medal – first place	1987 Salt Lake City	Floor
Gold medal – first place	1988 Salt Lake City	Floor
Gold medal – first place	1989 Athens	Floor
Gold medal – first place	1989 Athens	Vault
Silver medal – second place	1989 Athens	Team
Bronze medal – third place	1987 Salt Lake City	Team
Bronze medal – third place	1988 Salt Lake City	Team
Bronze medal – third place	1988 Salt Lake City	All Around

Kim Hamilton Anthony (born 1967 or 1968) is an American motivational speaker and former artistic gymnast. Representing the UCLA Bruins, she won the floor exercise title at the NCAA Gymnastics Championships in 1987, 1988, and 1989, becoming the first female gymnast to win three straight NCAA titles in an individual category. After gymnastics, she began working as a Christian chaplain and motivational speaker.

== Early gymnastics career ==
Watching Nadia Comăneci at the 1976 Olympics on television inspired Hamilton at age nine to learn gymnastics, and she taught herself to tumble on her living room floor and on sidewalks. She soon trained at a proper gym, something her family paid for by cleaning the gym after hours. Ranked the No. 1 gymnast in her age group in Virginia for many years, she traveled to win titles in England and South Africa. A member of the U.S. national artistic gymnastics team from 1984 to 1986, she did not make the cut for the 1984 Olympics, but placed fourth in all-around at the 1985 U.S. National Championships. She graduated as the salutatorian of the class of 1986 of George Wythe High School in Richmond.

== NCAA career ==
Hamilton was the first African American to receive a full scholarship for gymnastics at UCLA. The first member of her family to go to college, Hamilton from age nine aspired to go to UCLA because of its decorated men's basketball program. At UCLA, she befriended the track athlete Jackie Joyner-Kersee, whom she considered her "big sister". She received six All-American citations in her four years at UCLA and would be inducted into the UCLA Athletics Hall of Fame in 2000 and the Virginia Sports Hall of Fame in 2017. One judge said of her: "She's absolutely beautiful and executes flawlessly". In 2016, she was one of sixteen gymnasts named by the Pac-12 Conference to its All-Century Team.

In her first year, while helping UCLA to finish third at the 1987 NCAA Championships, Hamilton earned a score of 9.80 in floor exercise, winning the event and setting a meet record. During the 1988 season, she injured her neck and back mislanding a vault, but returned to competition two weeks later. At the 1988 NCAA Championships, she repeated her first-place result, again receiving a 9.80 floor score, and finished in third place in all-around.

Ahead of the 1989 NCAA Championships, where UCLA would be seeded No. 1, Hamilton developed a new floor routine, saying she wanted "the challenge". The routine was considered an impressive balletic performance with "exotic" floor music. At the NCAA's, she had a chance to seize the team championship with an exceptional floor exercise, needing to score 9.95 to put UCLA in a tie with Georgia, but came 0.05 short. Her strong 9.90 score (a new meet record) nonetheless gave her first place in floor (in a tie with Georgia's Corrinne Wright). This made her the first female gymnast to win the same NCAA championship three times in a row. Additionally, Hamilton had a surprising first-place finish in vault with a routine that scored 9.75 (another meet record) and included her first competitive Cuervo. Her career total of four individual NCAA titles matched the record at the time. (Note: Before Hamilton, the only gymnasts to win four NCAA titles were Penney Hauschild of Alabama and Kelly Garrison-Steves of Oklahoma.) A foot tendon injury kept her out of the 1990 Championships in her senior year.

== Post-gymnastics ==
Hamilton (known after marriage as Kim Anthony) discovered spirituality through her future husband, whose teaching about Christianity comforted her not long after she was held at gunpoint in mid-1987. From 2000 to 2011, working for the Cru subsidiary Athletes in Action (AIA), Anthony and her husband served as chaplains for players, families, and others associated with the National Football League (NFL)'s Miami Dolphins. She additionally served as an AIA chaplain for the wives of NFL head coaches and executives. She has further traveled as a motivational speaker and has worked in gymnastics broadcasting, including as a color commentator for ESPN.

Anthony spent ten years writing Unfavorable Odds, a memoir about her upbringing and gymnastics career, which was published in 2010. She hosted an Unfavorable Odds podcast for FamilyLife, a division of Cru, beginning in 2019.

== Personal life ==
Kim Hamilton was born to teenage parents in Richmond, Virginia. She grew up in poverty and used substances at an early age, though stopped by the time she was at UCLA. She has recalled rolling joints to gain the approval of her father, who was in and out of her life when she was little; she would eventually reconcile with him while writing her memoir.

She met UCLA football player Corwin Anthony in her sophomore year; they married in March 1992 and have two sons. They lived in Fort Lauderdale, Florida, while serving the Miami Dolphins, before moving to Xenia, Ohio, the headquarters of AIA, in 2011, when Corwin was promoted to an executive position.

== Bibliography ==
- Hamilton Anthony, Kim (2010). Unfavorable Odds: The Story of UCLA's First African-American Female Gymnastics Champion. Tate Publishing. ISBN 1615664955.
