= Oregon State Beavers women's gymnastics =

Sports team

- Founded: 1967; 59 years ago
- University: Oregon State University
- Head coach: Tanya Chaplin
- Conference: Pac-12
- Home arena: Gill Coliseum (Capacity: 9,301)
- Colors: Orange and black

Super Six appearances
- 1980, 1981, 1982, 1985, 1991, 1992, 1995, 1996, 2019

NCAA Regional championships
- 1980, 1981, 1982, 1985, 1991, 1992, 1995, 1996, 2019

NCAA Tournament appearances
- 1975, 1976, 1977, 1978, 1979, 1980, 1981, 1982, 1983, 1984, 1985, 1986, 1987, 1988, 1989, 1990, 1991, 1992, 1993, 1994, 1995, 1996, 1997, 1998, 1999, 2000, 2001, 2002, 2003, 2004, 2005, 2006, 2007, 2008, 2009, 2010, 2011,2012, 2013, 2014, 2015, 2016, 2017, 2018, 2019, 2021, 2022, 2023, 2024, 2025, 2026

Conference championships
- 1983, 1985, 1991, 1992, 1994, 1996, 2011, 2013

The Oregon State Beavers women's gymnastics team represents Oregon State University in NCAA women's artistic gymnastics, competing at the Gill Coliseum in Corvallis, Oregon.

== History ==
The program began in 1966; competing the first time in 1967, with Sylvia Moore taking the lead as the first gymnastics coach of the modern era of Oregon State. She headed the program until 1975, when Ron Ludwig succeeded her – the Beavers finished sixth at the AIAW Regional in Monmouth, Oregon. With Ludwig at the helm, the Beavers won the Regional Championship five times, not placing below fourth the whole ten years he was leading. In 1979, Oregon State finished seventh at the AIAW Championships. The next season the Beavers finished in a record fourth in the team competition, with two representatives in event finals. In 1981, Mary Ayotte finished in a record seventh place in the all-around at Nationals as the Beavers placed seventh but, the Beavers' first National champion was Laurie Carter, who won the balance beam. Mary Ayotte soon became Oregon State's second National champion when, in 1982, she was the National floor champion. 1983 saw the Beavers finish ninth at Nationals. Heidi Anderson, a transfer from Penn State, won the balance beam title in 1984. Oregon State were sixth in 1985. Ludwig resigned in June 1985, citing health problems.

Jim Turpin succeeded Ludwig, taking time for the program to adjust with no representation at the 1986 Nationals; the program did finish third at Regionals though. The program didn't advance to Nationals again in 1987, but were seventh in 1988, advancing following their Regional win at home in Corvallis. Joy Selig was fourteenth in the all-around and took a silver medal in the floor exercise. Selig proved to be a strong Beaver gymnast with a beam national title in 1989. 1990 was another great year for Selig as she defended her beam title, as well as gaining the floor title too. In 1991, the Beavers were fourth in the team competition and saw medals from Chari Knight and Joy Selig. Amy Durham tied with two gymnasts in 1993 for the National floor title. Turpin left the Beavers program following the 1997 season, and former UCLA standout Tanya Chaplin became his successor. In 2001, Katrina Severin was second on the vault. The Beavers won the 2008 West Regional, held in Corvallis. Mandi Rodriguez was third on vault at the 2010 Nationals. 2011 saw the Beavers win the NCAA Regional and Jen Kesler and Makayla Stambaugh make the uneven bars podium. In 2012, Melanie Jones took a bronze on floor. In 2014, Madeline Gardiner took a bronze medal in the beam. Junior Risa Perez who transferred from Arizona State in 2015 was top 3 at Pac-12 championships on Floor Routine, in 2016 Gardner along with now senior Risa Perez won the Pac-12 Beam Championships, Perez won the Regional Beam Georgia Championships finished 8th overall at Texas Nationals. Gardiner then repeated this the following year in 2015.

One of the highest rated recruits in all sports in Oregon State's history was future 2-time gold medal Olympian Jade Carey, who originally committed to compete for Oregon State University starting in the 2018–19 school year. She officially signed with the Beaver on November 9, 2017, but deferred enrollment until after the 2020 Olympics. She made her long awaited NCAA debut on January 15, 2022.

On January 29, 1993, Chari Knight earned an all-around score of 39.750, setting the benchmark for Oregon State's all-around record. On January 23, 2022, Carey broke the record by scoring a 39.800. The current all-around record is 39.925, set by Carey on March 15, 2025.

== Current roster ==
Name	Height	Year	Hometown	Club
Olivia Buckner	5-4	SR	Riverton, UT	Olympus Gymnastics
Kaylee Cheek	5-5	SO	Spanish Fork, UT	Bold Gymnastics
Kyanna Crabb	5-1	JR	Vancouver, WA	Naydenov Gymnastics
Taylor DeVries	5-4	SR	Roscoe, IL	Legacy Elite Gymnastics
Sophia Esposito	5-3	SR	Melville, NY	New Image Gymnastics
Guilianna Fiorillo	5-4	JR	San Jose, CA	Airborne Gymnastics
Mia Heather	5-2	SR	San Francisco, CA	San Mateo Gymnastics
Sophia Henry	5-4	FR	Blue Springs, MO	GAGE
McKinley James	5-7	FR	Missouri City, TX	Pearland Elite
Sophia Kaloudis	5-3	JR	Huntington, NY	Apex Athletics
Reina Marchal	5-3	JR	Las Vegas, NV	Salcianu Elite
Jazlene Pickens	4-9	FR	Pickerington, OH	Buckeye Gymnastics
Gabby Pierson	5-7	FR	Canby, OR	World Champions Centre
Camryn Richardson	5-3	FR	Pearland, TX	Pearland Elite
Katie Rude	5-1	SO	Stateline, NV	South Coast Gymnastics
Paloma Spiridonova	5-3	SO	Dallas, TX	WOGA
Giavanna Tatone	4-10	SO	Roseburg, OR	National Academy of Artistic Gymnastics
Pau Vargas	5-5	JR	Mexico City, MX	Dynasty Gymnastics

== Coaching staff ==
- Head coach: Tanya Chaplin
- Associate head coach: Michael Chaplin
- Assistant coach: Brian Carey
- Assistant coach: Kaytianna Kell
- Student assistant coach: Jade Carey

== Head coaches ==
Name	Years
Sylvia Moore	1967–75
Ron Ludwig	1976–85
Jim Turpin	1986–97
Tanya Chaplin	1998–present

== NCAA Champions ==
As of the end of the 2024 season, 5 different OSU Beavers gymnasts have won a total of 7 individual event championships.

Event	Winner/Year
Balance Beam	Laurie Cater 1981 *(AIAW); Heidi Anderson 1984; Joy Selig 1989, 1990
Floor Exercise	Mary Ayotte-Law 1982; Joy Selig 1990; Amy Durham 1993

== Athlete awards ==
=== AAI ===
- Mary Ayotte-Law (1984)
- Joy Selig (1991)
- Chari Knight (1994)
- Jade Carey (2025)

== Olympians ==
Year	Country	Name	Medal(s)	Notes
1980	Canada	Patti Jo Knorr		Boycotted
2008	Australia	Olivia Vivian		
2012	Canada	Madeline Gardiner		Alternate
2020	United States	Jade Carey	floor	
2024	United States	Jade Carey	team vault	
