= 2000 NCAA women's gymnastics championships =

American college gymnastics competition

- Venue: BSU Pavilion
- Location: Boise, Idaho
- Dates: April 13–15, 2000
- Teams: 12

Champions
- Women: Heather Brink, Nebraska; Mohini Bhardwaj, UCLA (39.625)
- Team: UCLA (2nd)

The 2000 NCAA women's gymnastics championships were contested at the 19th annual tournament hosted by the NCAA to determine the individual and team national champions of women's gymnastics among its member programs in the United States.

The competition took place from April 13–15 in Boise, Idaho, hosted by Boise State University in the BSU Pavilion.

UCLA won the team national championship, the Bruins' second NCAA national title and first since 1998.

Heather Brink, from Nebraska, and Mohini Bhardwaj, from UCLA, shared the individual all-around championship with scores of 39.625.

== Team Results ==
=== Session 1 ===
Position	Team	Vault (gymnastics)	Uneven bars	Balance beam	Floor (gymnastics)	Total
1	Georgia	49.525	49.050	48.950	49.350	196.775
2	Utah	49.050	48.925	49.050	49.225	196.125
3	Alabama	49.450	49.200	48.650	49.125	196.075
4	LSU	49.000	48.850	48.175	48.925	194.950
5	Oregon State	48.825	48.325	48.550	49.050	194.750
6	BYU	48.875	48.575	48.325	48.725	194.500

=== Session 2 ===
Position	Team	Vault (gymnastics)	Uneven bars	Balance beam	Floor (gymnastics)	Total
1	UCLA	49.525	49.300	49.050	49.375	197.250
2	Nebraska	49.050	48.425	49.100	49.425	196.000
3	Michigan	49.450	49.025	48.150	49.300	195.925
4	Penn State	48.800	48.550	48.825	49.175	195.350
5	Iowa State	48.850	48.700	48.800	48.975	195.325
6	West Virginia	48.775	48.475	48.175	48.750	194.175

=== Super Six ===
Position	Team	Vault (gymnastics)	Uneven bars	Balance beam	Floor (gymnastics)	Total
1	UCLA Bruins	49.450	49.350	49.125	49.375	197.300
2	Utah Red Rocks	49.400	49.000	49.125	49.350	196.875
3	Georgia Gym Dogs	49.475	49.025	48.800	49.500	196.800
4	Nebraska Cornhuskers	49.150	49.250	48.975	49.350	196.725
5	Alabama Crimson Tide	49.275	49.150	48.925	49.150	196.500
6	Michigan Wolverines	49.375	48.975	48.100	49.275	195.725

== See also ==
- 2000 NCAA men's gymnastics championships
