= Gigi Zosa =

Canadian gymnast

Personal information
- Born: 1968 (age 56–57) Winnipeg, Manitoba, Canada

Sport
- Sport: Gymnastics

Gigi Zosa (born 1968) is a Canadian gymnast. She competed in six events at the 1984 Summer Olympics.

Born in Winnipeg to a Filipino family, she moved to Huntington Beach where she graduated from Marina High School.

She attended UCLA and was a member of the Bruins gymnastics team. In the 1985-1986 season, she and fellow freshman Tanya Service led the team to a number of collegiate titles. Zosa placed second in uneven bars and balance beam at the NCAA women's gymnastics championships in 1986.
