= 1998 NCAA women's gymnastics championships =

American college gymnastics competition

- Venue: Pauley Pavilion
- Location: Los Angeles, California
- Dates: April 16–18, 1998
- Teams: 12

Champions
- Women: Kim Arnold, Georgia (39.725)
- Team: Georgia (4th)

The 1998 NCAA women's gymnastics championships were contested at the 17th annual tournament hosted by the NCAA to determine the individual and team national champions of women's gymnastics among its member programs in the United States.

The competition took place from April 16–18 in Los Angeles, California, hosted by UCLA in the Pauley Pavilion.

Georgia won the team championship, the Gym Dogs' fourth NCAA national title and first since 1993.

Defending champion Kim Arnold, from Georgia, again won the individual all-around championship, her second.

== Champions ==
Event	Gold	Silver	Bronze
Team	Georgia Gym Dogs; Brooke Andersen; Kim Arnold; Julie Ballard; Jenni Beathard; Amanda Curry; Stacey Galloway; Caroline Harris; Karin Lichey; Kristi Lichey; Sam Muhleman; Kelli Prestigiacomo; Suzanne Sears; Kathleen Shrieves; Courtney Whittle	Florida Gators; Teal Chiabotti; Maryann Esposito; Gabby Fuchs; Kourtney Gallivan; Betsy Hamm; Susan Hines; Kim Novack; Erika Selga; Mikara Steinberg; Sybil Stephenson; Katie Sydes; Chrissy Van Fleet; Dana Wickham	Alabama Crimson Tide; Merrit Booth; Mandy Chapman; Lexa Evans; Becca Fields; Robin Hawkins; Katie Hornecker; Gina Logan; April Makinson; Danielle McAdams; Shay Murphy; Lissy Smith; Gwen Spidle; Dara Stewart
All-Around	Kim Arnold (Georgia)	Karin Lichey (Georgia)	Klara Kudilkova (Washington)
Vault	Susan Hines (Florida), Larissa Fontaine (Stanford)	N/A	Heather Kabnick (Michigan)
Uneven Bars	Heidi Moneymaker (UCLA)	Nikki Peters (Michigan)	Jenni Beathard (Georgia)
Balance Beam	Betsy Hamm (Florida), Jenni Beathard (Georgia), Kim Arnold (Georgia)	N/A	N/A
Floor Exercise	Stella Umeh (UCLA), Karin Lichey (Georgia)	N/A	Kim Arnold (Georgia)

== Team Results ==
=== Session 1 ===
Position	Team	Vault (gymnastics)	Uneven bars	Balance beam	Floor (gymnastics)	Total
1	Georgia Gym Dogs	49.300	49.575	49.350	49.600	197.825
2	Alabama Crimson Tide	49.100	49.200	48.875	49.300	196.475
3	Arizona State Sun Devils	48.850	49.100	48.475	49.025	195.450
4	Michigan Wolverines	49.150	49.400	47.725	49.150	195.425
5	NC State Wolfpack	48.300	48.075	48.825	49.925	194.125
6	BYU Cougars	47.900	48.725	47.950	48.825	193.400

=== Session 2 ===
Position	Team	Vault (gymnastics)	Uneven bars	Balance beam	Floor (gymnastics)	Total
1	UCLA Bruins	49.450	49.375	48.950	49.150	196.925
2	Florida Gators	49.250	49.300	48.925	49.275	196.750
3	Utah Red Rocks	48.750	49.450	48.975	49.025	196.200
4	Washington Huskies	48.950	49.075	48.100	49.325	195.450
5	LSU Tigers	48.725	49.025	48.750	48.800	195.300
6	Penn State Nittany Lions	48.450	49.125	48.425	48.625	194.625

=== Super Six ===
Position	Team	Vault (gymnastics)	Uneven bars	Balance beam	Floor (gymnastics)	Total
1	Georgia Gym Dogs	49.600	49.450	49.300	49.375	197.725
2	Florida Gators	49.300	49.075	48.600	49.375	196.350
3	Alabama Crimson Tide	48.925	49.300	48.875	49.200	196.300
4	Utah Red Rocks	48.475	49.375	49.075	49.100	196.025
5	UCLA Bruins	49.200	49.400	47.650	49.500	195.750
6	Arizona State Sun Devils	49.000	48.250	48.875	49.325	195.450

== See also ==
- 1998 NCAA men's gymnastics championships
