= 1989 NCAA women's gymnastics championships =

American college gymnastics competition

- Venue: Georgia Coliseum
- Location: Athens, Georgia
- Dates: April 14–15, 1989
- Teams: 12

Champions
- Women: Corrinne Wright, Georgia (38.900)
- Team: Georgia (2nd)

The 1989 NCAA women's gymnastics championships were contested at the eighth annual meet hosted by the NCAA to determine the individual and team national champions of women's gymnastics among its member programs in the United States.

A total of twelve teams competed for the championship, which took place April 14–15 at the Georgia Coliseum at the University of Georgia in Atlanta, Georgia.

Hosts Georgia won the team title, their second.

Corrinne Wright, also from Georgia, won the individual all-around title.

== Summary ==
While Suzanne Yoculan and the Georgia Gym Dogs hosted, the favorite heading into nationals was Tanya Service and the UCLA Bruins with the #1 seed. Juggernaut #2 seed, Utah came in with the addition of 1988 American Olympian, Missy Marlowe. The defending champion, Alabama, lost their top gymnast, Marie Robbins, to an ankle injury before the finals.

At the end of the competition, UCLA head coach Jerry Tomlinson filed an inquiry over several scores with the judges. After the judges review, UCLA still fell short five one-hundredths of a point.

== Team Results ==
Position	Team	Vault (gymnastics)	Uneven bars	Balance beam	Floor (gymnastics)	Total
1	Georgia Gym Dogs	47.950	48.300	47.900	48.500	192.650
2	UCLA Bruins	48.550	48.100	47.300	48.650	192.600
3	Alabama Crimson Tide	48.400	48.350	47.150	48.200	192.100
4	Nebraska Cornhuskers	48.000	47.650	47.450	47.700	190.800
5	Utah Red Rocks	47.500	48.100	47.200	47.400	190.200
6	Cal State Fullerton Titans	47.400	47.450	47.050	47.550	189.450
7	Arizona State Sun Devils	47.350	46.750	46.800	47.000	187.900
7	Oregon State Beavers	47.050	46.450	47.200	47.200	187.900
9	Oklahoma Sooners	46.950	48.000	45.450	46.650	187.050
10	Florida Gators	47.200	47.750	44.750	47.300	187.000
11	Arizona Wildcats	46.800	47.000	45.850	46.850	186.500
12	Ohio State Buckeyes	46.600	47.300	46.150	46.350	186.400
