= 1994 NCAA women's gymnastics championships =

American college gymnastics competition

- Venue: Jon M. Huntsman Center
- Location: Salt Lake City, Utah
- Dates: April 21–23, 1994
- Teams: 12

Champions
- Women: Jenny Hansen, Kentucky (39.400)
- Team: Utah (8th)

The 1994 NCAA women's gymnastics championships were contested at the 13th annual gym meet hosted by the NCAA to determine the individual and team national champions of women's gymnastics among its member programs in the United States.

The competition took place from April 21–23 in Salt Lake City, Utah, hosted by the University of Utah in the Jon M. Huntsman Center.

Hosts Utah won the team championship, the Red Rocks' eighth title overall and first since 1992.

Jenny Hansen, from Kentucky, again won the individual all-around championship, the second of her eventual three consecutive titles.

== Team Results ==
=== Session 1 ===
Position	Team	Vault (gymnastics)	Uneven bars	Balance beam	Floor (gymnastics)	Total
1	Georgia Gym Dogs	49.225	48.275	48.450	49.100	195.050
2	UCLA Bruins	49.150	48.350	47.700	48.500	193.700
3	Michigan Wolverines	48.850	48.050	48.325	48.250	193.475
4	BYU Cougars	48.575	48.000	47.475	48.275	192.325
5	Washington Huskies	48.150	46.750	47.550	48.075	190.525
6	New Hampshire Wildcats	47.475	46.075	46.825	48.075	188.450

=== Session 2 ===
Position	Team	Vault (gymnastics)	Uneven bars	Balance beam	Floor (gymnastics)	Total
1	Alabama Crimson Tide	49.400	49.025	48.800	49.075	196.300
2	Utah Red Rocks	49.425	49.175	47.350	48.975	194.925
3	Florida Gators	48.700	48.200	48.875	48.475	194.250
4	Oregon State Beavers	48.975	48.100	48.750	47.800	193.625
5	LSU Tigers	48.875	47.450	48.475	48.425	193.225
6	Arizona State Sun Devils	48.900	47.600	46.375	47.950	190.825

=== Super Six ===
Position	Team	Vault (gymnastics)	Uneven bars	Balance beam	Floor (gymnastics)	Total
1	Utah Red Rocks	49.525	49.325	48.300	49.250	196.400
2	Alabama Crimson Tide	49.050	49.350	48.950	49.000	196.350
3	Georgia Gym Dogs	49.325	49.275	48.075	49.175	195.850
4	Michigan Wolverines	49.125	48.400	48.950	48.675	195.150
5	UCLA Bruins	49.350	48.250	48.450	48.925	194.975
6	Florida Gators	48.775	48.275	48.975	48.825	194.850
