= Joy Selig (sculpture) =

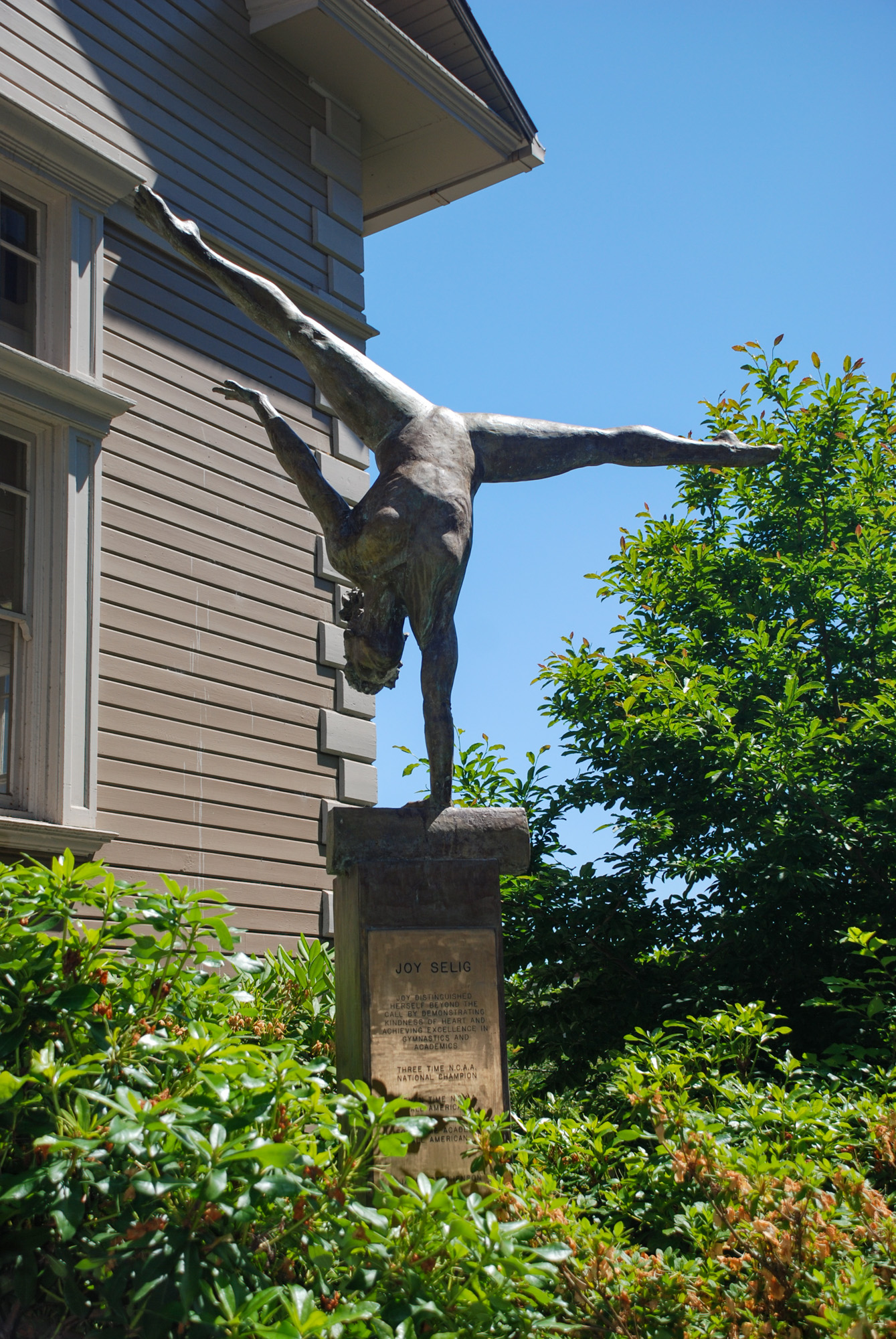
- The sculpture in 2007
- Artist: James Stephenson
- Year: 1993
- Type: Sculpture
- Medium: Bronze
- Subject: Joy Selig
- Location: Corvallis, Oregon, United States; 44.56494°N 123.27553°W
- Owner: Oregon State University

Joy Selig is an outdoor 1993 bronze sculpture depicting gymnast Joy Selig Petersen by James Stephenson, installed outside the Gladys Valley Gymnastics Center on the Oregon State University campus in Corvallis, Oregon, in the United States.

== Description ==
The statue depicts gymnast Joy Selig in a handstand position. Brittany Kay Sundberg of Corvallis Arts Review said, "Her toes point out while her face holds an expression of concentration as she balances on one hand."

== Reception ==
Sundberg wrote that the artist "captured her grace and strength in the subtle muscle tones and impeccable lines created with her body in this impressive pose... Stephenson expertly portrays the dedication she must have had to be a three-time national champion, among the other records listed on the plaque for this sculpture. Her time and dedication led to her success and this statue captures her hard work and concentration."

== See also ==
- 1993 in art
- Oregon State Beavers gymnastics
