= Sarah Patterson (disambiguation) =

Sarah Patterson (born 1970) is a former English actress.

Sarah Patterson may also refer to:

- Sarah Patterson (born 1959), English author and daughter of author Jack Higgins
- Sarah Patterson (coach), Alabama Crimson Tide gymnastics team coach
