= 1999 NCAA women's gymnastics championships =

American college gymnastics competition

- Venue: Jon M. Huntsman Center
- Location: Salt Lake City, Utah
- Dates: April 22–24, 1999
- Teams: 12

Champions
- Women: Theresa Kulikowski, Utah (39.675)
- Team: Georgia (5th)

The 1999 NCAA women's gymnastics championships were contested at the 18th annual tournament hosted by the NCAA to determine the individual and team national champions of women's gymnastics among its member programs in the United States.

The competition took place April 22–24 in Salt Lake City, Utah, hosted by the University of Utah at the Jon M. Huntsman Center.

Defending champions Georgia won the team national championship, the Gym Dogs' fifth NCAA national title.

Theresa Kulikowski, from Utah, won the individual all-around championship.

== Champions ==
Event	Gold	Silver	Bronze
Team	Georgia Gym Dogs; Brooke Andersen; Emily Chell; Amanda Curry; Eileen Diaz; Stacey Galloway; Caroline Harris; April Hoellman; Karin Lichey; Kristi Lichey; Danielle Maurone; Sam Muhleman; Suzanne Sears; Kathleen Shrieves; Talya Vexler	Michigan Wolverines; Beth Amelkovich; Kathy Burke; Sarah Cain; Kristin Duff; Brianne Fuller; Bridget Knaeble; Amy Kuczera; Sarah-Elizabeth Langford; Shannon MacKenzie; Erin McWatt; Chrissy Michaud; Kate Nellans; Nikki Peters; Melissa Peterson; Kristin Rosella; Jodie Rosenberg; Karina Senior; Lisa Simes	Alabama Crimson Tide; Natalie Barrington; Mandy Chapman; Lexa Evans; Krista Gole; Robin Hawkins; Katie Hornecker; Gina Logan; April Makinson; Alexa Martinez; Whitney Morgan; Andrée Pickens; Lissy Smith; Gwen Spidle; Dara Stewart; Raegan Tomasek
All-Around	Theresa Kulikowski (Utah)	Karin Lichey (Georgia)	Heidi Moneymaker (UCLA)
Vault	Heidi Moneymaker (UCLA)	Theresa Kulikowski (Utah)	Larissa Fontaine (Stanford), Karin Lichey (Georgia)
Uneven Bars	Angie Leonard (Utah)	Nikki Peters (Michigan), Sarah Cain (Michigan)	Andree Pickens (Alabama), Lena Degteva (UCLA), Karin Lichey (Georgia), Jenni Beathard (Georgia)
Balance Beam	Andree Pickens (Alabama), Theresa Kulikowski (Utah), Kiralee Hayashi (UCLA)	Shannon Bowles (Utah), Lissy Smith (Alabama)	Jenni Beathard (Georgia)
Floor Exercise	Mary Oestreng (Bowling Green)	Theresa Kulikowski (Utah)	Elizabeth McNabb (Arizona State)

== Team Results ==
=== Session 1 ===
Position	Team	Vault (gymnastics)	Uneven bars	Balance beam	Floor (gymnastics)	Total
1	UCLA Bruins	49.225	49.225	48.725	49.250	196.425
2	Alabama Crimson Tide	49.025	48.900	47.850	49.175	194.950
3	Arizona State Sun Devils	48.325	48.350	48.525	49.325	194.525
4	LSU Tigers	48.775	48.675	48.975	48.050	194.475
5	Stanford Cardinal	48.750	48.850	47.375	49.025	194.000
6	West Virginia Mountaineers	48.275	48.250	47.875	47.450	191.850

=== Session 2 ===
Position	Team	Vault (gymnastics)	Uneven bars	Balance beam	Floor (gymnastics)	Total
1	Georgia Gym Dogs	49.300	49.175	49.400	49.150	197.025
2	Michigan Wolverines	48.800	49.175	49.225	49.375	196.575
3	Nebraska Cornhuskers	48.925	48.950	49.075	49.275	196.225
4	Utah Red Rocks	48.950	49.250	48.050	49.225	195.475
5	Penn State Nittany Lions	48.550	48.950	48.600	48.675	194.775
6	Florida Gators	48.675	48.550	47.950	48.825	194.000

=== Super Six ===
Position	Team	Vault (gymnastics)	Uneven bars	Balance beam	Floor (gymnastics)	Total
1	Georgia Gym Dogs	49.400	48.925	49.275	49.250	196.850
2	Michigan Wolverines	49.225	49.275	49.000	49.050	196.550
3	Alabama Crimson Tide	49.125	49.150	48.650	49.025	195.950
4	Arizona State Sun Devils	48.600	49.150	48.950	49.200	195.900
5	UCLA Bruins	49.175	49.125	48.575	48.975	195.850
6	Nebraska Cornhuskers	49.000	48.350	48.475	48.975	194.800

== See also ==
- 1999 NCAA men's gymnastics championships
