= 1995 NCAA women's gymnastics championships =

American college gymnastics competition

- Venue: Georgia Coliseum
- Location: Athens, Georgia
- Dates: April 20–22, 1995
- Teams: 12

Champions
- Women: Jenny Hansen, Kentucky (39.800)
- Team: Utah (8th)

The 1995 NCAA women's gymnastics championships were contested at the 14th annual gym meet hosted by the NCAA to determine the individual and team national champions of women's gymnastics among its member programs in the United States.

The competition took place from April 20–22 in Athens, Georgia, hosted by the University of Georgia at the Georgia Coliseum.

Defending champions Utah again won the team championship, the Red Rocks' ninth overall title.

Jenny Hansen, from Kentucky, again won the individual all-around championship, her third of three consecutive title.

== Team results ==
=== Session 1 ===
Position	Team	Vault (gymnastics)	Uneven bars	Balance beam	Floor (gymnastics)	Total
1	Georgia Gym Dogs	49.600	48.950	48.725	49.550	196.825
2	Michigan Wolverines	49.450	48.850	48.600	48.800	195.700
3	Utah Red Rocks	48.950	48.125	49.125	49.125	195.325
4	LSU Tigers	48.625	47.900	47.850	48.650	193.025
5	Nebraska Cornhuskers	48.600	46.975	47.750	48.425	191.750
6	West Virginia Mountaineers	48.375	47.025	46.525	47.725	189.650

=== Session 2 ===
Position	Team	Vault (gymnastics)	Uneven bars	Balance beam	Floor (gymnastics)	Total
1	UCLA Bruins	49.000	49.150	48.800	49.425	196.375
2	Alabama Crimson Tide	49.200	48.375	48.650	49.375	195.600
3	Oregon State Beavers	48.900	48.825	49.050	48.725	195.500
4	Florida Gators	49.300	49.025	48.775	48.325	195.425
5	Penn State Nittany Lions	48.475	48.575	48.275	48.825	194.150
6	BYU Cougars	48.575	47.925	47.100	48.325	191.925

=== Super Six ===
Position	Team	Vault (gymnastics)	Uneven bars	Balance beam	Floor (gymnastics)	Total
1	Utah Red Rocks	49.050	49.250	49.100	49.250	196.650
2	Michigan Wolverines	49.250	49.025	48.975	49.175	196.425
2	Alabama Crimson Tide	49.475	49.000	49.100	48.850	196.425
4	UCLA Bruins	49.025	48.700	49.250	49.175	196.150
5	Georgia Gym Dogs	49.550	48.800	48.400	49.325	196.075
6	Oregon State Beavers	48.700	48.650	49.200	48.300	194.850
