= 1996 NCAA women's gymnastics championships =

American college gymnastics competition

- Venue: Coleman Coliseum
- Location: Tuscaloosa, Alabama
- Dates: April 25–27, 1996
- Teams: 12

Champions
- Women: Meredith Willard, Alabama (39.450)
- Team: Alabama (3rd)

The 1996 NCAA women's gymnastics championships were contested at the 15th annual gym meet hosted by the NCAA to determine the individual and team national champions of women's gymnastics among its member programs in the United States.

The competition took place from April 25–27 in Tuscaloosa, Alabama, hosted by the University of Alabama in the Coleman Coliseum.

Hosts Alabama won the team title, the Crimson Tide's third overall title and first since 1991. With a score of 198.025, Alabama also set a new NCAA record for team scoring.

Meredith Willard, also from Alabama, won the individual all-around championship.

== Team Results ==
=== Session 1 ===
Position	Team	Vault (gymnastics)	Uneven bars	Balance beam	Floor (gymnastics)	Total
1	Georgia Gym Dogs	49.400	49.175	49.025	48.800	196.400
2	UCLA Bruins	48.875	48.825	48.925	48.675	195.300
3	Michigan Wolverines	49.475	48.125	48.125	48.250	193.975
4	Nebraska Cornhuskers	48.650	48.950	47.900	48.450	193.950
5	Penn State Nittany Lions	48.250	48.425	47.800	48.225	192.700
6	BYU Cougars	48.125	47.950	47.724	48.700	192.500

=== Session 2 ===
Position	Team	Vault (gymnastics)	Uneven bars	Balance beam	Floor (gymnastics)	Total
1	Alabama Crimson Tide	49.550	48.775	48.475	49.525	196.325
2	Utah Red Rocks	49.000	49.150	48.875	48.975	196.000
3	Oregon State Beavers	49.250	49.025	48.700	48.725	195.700
4	Arizona Wildcats	48.775	49.400	47.900	49.050	195.125
5	Florida Gators	49.150	48.875	48.475	48.325	194.825
6	Stanford Cardinal	48.500	48.475	48.475	48.575	194.025

=== Super Six ===
Position	Team	Vault (gymnastics)	Uneven bars	Balance beam	Floor (gymnastics)	Total
1	Alabama Crimson Tide	49.775	49.475	49.150	49.625	198.025
2	UCLA Bruins	49.450	49.250	49.500	49.275	197.475
3	Georgia Gym Dogs	49.675	49.575	49.400	49.125	196.775
3	Utah Red Rocks	49.250	49.200	49.150	49.175	196.775
5	Oregon State Beavers	49.475	49.175	48.925	48.950	196.525
6	Michigan Wolverines	49.300	49.000	48.975	49.100	196.375

== See also ==
- 1996 NCAA men's gymnastics championships
