= 1997 NCAA women's gymnastics championships =

American college gymnastics competition

- Venue: O'Connell Center
- Location: Gainesville, Florida
- Dates: April 17–19, 1997
- Teams: 12

Champions
- Women: Kim Arnold, Georgia (39.550)
- Team: UCLA (1st)

The 1997 NCAA women's gymnastics championships were contested at the 16th annual tournament hosted by the NCAA to determine the individual and team national champions of women's gymnastics among its member programs in the United States.

The competition took place April 17–19 in Gainesville, Florida, hosted by the University of Florida at the O'Connell Center.

UCLA won the team competition, the Bruins' first title (and the first NCAA title won by a team either than Utah, Georgia or Alabama).

Kim Arnold, from Georgia, won the individual all-around championship.

== Team Results ==
=== Session 1 ===
Position	Team	Vault (gymnastics)	Uneven bars	Balance beam	Floor (gymnastics)	Total
1	Georgia Gym Dogs	49.400	49.275	49.125	49.275	197.075
2	UCLA Bruins	49.275	49.275	48.925	48.950	196.425
3	Nebraska Cornhuskers	49.200	49.175	48.775	48.875	196.025
3	Utah Red Rocks	49.025	49.075	49.250	48.675	196.025
5	Penn State Nittany Lions	48.800	48.574	48.325	48.600	194.300
6	LSU Tigers	48.650	47.875	48.850	48.450	193.825

=== Session 2 ===
Position	Team	Vault (gymnastics)	Uneven bars	Balance beam	Floor (gymnastics)	Total
1	Arizona State Sun Devils	49.175	49.175	49.275	48.700	196.275
2	Michigan Wolverines	49.300	49.125	49.125	48.650	196.200
3	Florida Gators	49.250	49.100	48.750	48.975	196.075
4	Washington Huskies	49.175	49.025	48.725	49.050	195.975
5	Alabama Crimson Tide	49.125	49.225	48.325	48.925	195.600
6	Minnesota Golden Gophers	48.625	48.975	48.450	48.725	194.775

=== Super Six ===
Position	Team	Vault (gymnastics)	Uneven bars	Balance beam	Floor (gymnastics)	Total
1	UCLA Bruins	49.300	49.525	49.200	49.125	197.150
2	Arizona State Sun Devils	49.300	49.125	49.275	49.150	196.850
3	Georgia Gym Dogs	49.650	49.625	48.125	49.200	196.600
4	Michigan Wolverines	49.425	49.425	48.775	48.875	196.500
5	Florida Gators	49.325	48.900	49.225	48.975	196.425
6	Nebraska Cornhuskers	48.825	49.225	48.550	48.650	195.250

== See also ==
- 1997 NCAA men's gymnastics championships
