= 1992 NCAA women's gymnastics championships =

American college gymnastics competition

- Venue: St. Paul Civic Center
- Location: St. Paul, Minnesota
- Dates: April 24–25, 1992
- Teams: 12

Champions
- Women: Missy Marlowe, Utah (39.650)
- Team: Utah Red Rocks (7th)

The 1992 NCAA women's gymnastics championships were contested at the 11th annual meet hosted by the NCAA to determine the individual and team national champions of women's gymnastics among its member programs in the United States.

The competition took place in St. Paul, Minnesota in the St. Paul Civic Center.

Utah won the team championship, their seventh and first since 1990.

Missy Marlowe, also from Utah, won the all-around individual championship.

== Team Results ==
Position	Team	Vault (gymnastics)	Uneven bars	Balance beam	Floor (gymnastics)	Total
1	Utah Red Rocks	49.000	49.400	48.275	48.975	195.650
2	Georgia Gym Dogs	49.100	48.250	48.450	48.800	194.600
3	Alabama Crimson Tide	48.725	48.875	47.675	48.075	193.350
4	Penn State Nittany Lions	48.125	48.400	47.975	48.275	192.775
5	Arizona Wildcats	48.550	48.675	48.075	46.650	191.950
6	Oregon State Beavers	48.650	47.500	46.800	48.425	191.375
7	Arizona State Sun Devils	47.975	47.500	46.800	48.425	191.375
8	Cal Golden Bears	47.175	47.825	48.250	47.475	190.725
9	UCLA Bruins	47.175	48.400	46.300	47.950	189.825
10	Stanford Cardinal	47.425	47.675	46.725	47.275	189.100
11	Florida Gators	46.150	48.025	47.300	47.250	188.725
12	BYU Cougars	47.175	47.100	46.200	47.300	187.775
