= 1991 NCAA women's gymnastics championships =

American college gymnastics competition

- Venue: Gill Coliseum
- Location: Tuscaloosa, Alabama
- Dates: April 19–20, 1991
- Teams: 12

Champions
- Women: Hope Spivey, Georgia (39.300)
- Team: Alabama Crimson Tide (2nd)

The 1991 NCAA women's gymnastics championships were contested at the tenth annual meet hosted by the NCAA to determine the individual and team national champions of women's gymnastics among its member programs in the United States.

The competition took place from April 19–20 in Tuscaloosa, Alabama, hosted by the University of Alabama at Coleman Coliseum.

Hosts Alabama won the team title, their second overall and first since 1988.

== Team Results ==
Position	Team	Vault (gymnastics)	Uneven bars	Balance beam	Floor (gymnastics)	Total
1	Alabama Crimson Tide	49.075	48.575	48.675	48.800	195.125
2	Utah Red Rocks	48.475	48.650	48.475	48.775	194.375
3	Georgia Gym Dogs	48.525	49.025	47.500	48.325	193.375
4	Oregon State Beavers	48.200	48.325	48.125	47.700	192.350
5	Penn State Nittany Lions	48.300	48.025	47.025	47.600	190.950
6	Florida Gators	46.750	47.800	47.725	47.425	189.700
7	LSU Tigers	47.900	47.700	46.225	46.775	188.600
8	BYU Cougars	47.650	47.250	46.050	46.750	187.700
9	Arizona State Sun Devils	47.125	47.500	46.200	46.825	187.650
9	Auburn Tigers	47.225	48.050	46.375	46.000	187.650
11	Arizona Wildcats	47.475	47.825	45.550	46.625	187.475
12	Utah State Aggies	46.800	46.850	45.450	46.850	185.950
