= 1985 NCAA women's gymnastics championships =

American college gymnastics competition

- Venue: Special Events Center
- Location: Salt Lake City, Utah
- Dates: April 12–13, 1985
- Teams: 10

Champions
- Women: Penney Hauschild, Alabama (37.950)
- Team: Utah (4th)

The 1985 NCAA women's gymnastics championships were contested at the fourth annual tournament hosted by the NCAA to determine the individual and team national champions of women's gymnastics among its member programs in the United States.

The competition took place from April 12–13 in Salt Lake City, Utah, hosted by the University of Utah at the Special Events Center.

Hosts and three-time defending champions Utah again won the team title, the Red Rocks' fourth NCAA title.

Penney Hauschild, from Alabama, won the individual all-around championship.

== Team Results ==
Position	Team	Vault (gymnastics)	Uneven bars	Balance beam	Floor (gymnastics)	Total
1	Utah Red Rocks	46.800	47.050	47.050	46.450	188.350
2	Arizona State Sun Devils	47.300	45.900	46.350	47.050	186.600
3	Florida Gators	46.600	46.000	45.150	46.550	148.300
4	Alabama Crimson Tide	46.450	46.250	45.950	45.400	184.050
5	Cal State Fullerton Titans	46.950	45.900	44.800	45.850	183.500
6	Oregon State Beavers	45.700	45.150	46.000	46.300	183.150
7	Georgia Gym Dogs	45.400	45.500	45.450	44.550	180.900
8	Ohio State Buckeyes	46.300	45.100	42.950	45.400	179.750
9	Penn State Nittany Lions	45.650	44.750	43.400	45.250	179.000
10	Oklahoma Sooners	45.000	43.950	43.250	45.150	177.400

== Top Ten Individual All-Around Results ==
Position	Gymnast	Team	Vault (gymnastics)	Uneven bars	Balance beam	Floor (gymnastics)	Total
1	Penney Hauschild	Alabama	9.500	9.550	9.450	9.450	37.950
2	Kim Neal	Arizona State	9.550	9.450	9.200	9.700	37.900
3	Elfi Schlegel	Florida	9.500	9.300	9.300	9.550	37.650
3	Tami Elliot	Cal State Fullerton	9.550	9.350	9.250	9.500	37.650
5	Sandy Sobotka	Utah	9.550	9.050	9.600	9.400	37.600
5	Lisa Mitzel	Utah	9.200	9.250	9.450	9.700	37.600
7	Lynne Lederer	Utah	9.250	9.500	9.200	9.550	37.500
8	Mary Kay Brown	Arizona	9.350	9.200	9.300	9.550	37.400
9	Heidi Anderson	Oregon State	9.150	9.300	9.550	9.350	37.350
10	Terri Eckert	Georgia	9.150	9.550	9.450	9.100	36.250

== Individual Event Finals Results ==
=== Vault ===
Rank	Name	Team	Vault Average
1	Elaine Alfano	Utah	9.625
2	Pam Loree	Penn State	9.425
3	Shari Mann	Arizona State	9.375
4	Tina Barnes	Oregon State	9.350
5	Tammy Smith	Florida	9.325
6	Callie Glanton	Cal State Fullerton	9.300
7	Julie Estin	Alabama	9.250
8	Elfi Schlegel	Florida	9.175
8	Tami Elliot	Cal State Fullerton	9.175
10	Taunia Rogers	Cal State Fullerton	9.100
11	Sandy Sobotka	Utah	9.075
12	Mary Olsen	Ohio State	8.975
13	Penney Hauschild	Alabama	8.950
14	Cindy Wilson	Alabama	8.400
15	Kim Neal	Arizona State	0.000

=== Uneven Bars ===
Rank	Name	Team	Score
1	Penney Hauschild	Alabama	9.700
2	Terri Eckert	Georgia	9.550
2	Celeste Harrington	Utah	9.550
4	Julie Estin	Alabama	9.500
4	Lynne Lederer	Utah	9.500
6	Tina Hermann	Utah	9.400
7	Roni Barrios	Cal State Fullerton	9.100
8	Gina Banales	Georgia	8.600
9	Kelly Chaplin	Arizona	8.450
10	Kim Neal	Arizona State	0.000
10	Kelly Chaplin	Arizona	9.400

=== Balance Beam ===
Rank	Name	Team	Score
1	Lisa Zeis	Arizona State	9.550
2	Terri Eckert	Georgia	9.500
3	Heidi Anderson	Oregon State	9.050
4	Penney Hauschild	Alabama	9.000
5	Tina Hermann	Utah	8.900
6	Lisa Mitzel	Utah	8.750
7	Becky Rashoff	Arizona State	8.550
8	Sandy Sobotka	Utah	8.350

=== Floor Exercise ===
Rank	Name	Team	Score
1	Lisa Mitzel	Utah	9.600
2	Becky Rashoff	Arizona State	9.550
2	Mary Kay Brown	Arizona	9.550
4	Tami Elliot	Cal State Fullerton	9.450
5	Elfi Schlegel	Florida	9.400
5	Lynne Lederer	Utah	9.400
7	Kelly Chaplin	Arizona	9.300
8	Cheryl Weatherstone	Utah	9.150
9	Kim Neal	Arizona State	0.000

== See also ==
- 1985 NCAA men's gymnastics championships
