= 1984 NCAA women's gymnastics championships =

American college gymnastics competition

- Venue: Pauley Pavilion
- Location: Los Angeles, California
- Dates: April 6–7, 1984
- Teams: 10

Champions
- Women: Megan Marsden, Utah (37.900)
- Team: Utah (3rd)

The 1984 NCAA women's gymnastics championships were contested at the third annual tournament hosted by the NCAA to determine the individual and team national champions of women's gymnastics among its member programs in the United States.

The competition took place April 6–7 in Los Angeles, California, hosted by UCLA in Pauley Pavilion.

== Team results ==
Position	Team	Vault (gymnastics)	Uneven bars	Balance beam	Floor (gymnastics)	Total
1	Utah Red Rocks	47.200	47.300	45.300	46.250	186.050
2	UCLA Bruins	47.150	47.100	44.850	46.450	185.550
3	Cal State Fullerton Titans	46.600	47.300	44.400	45.600	183.900
4	Arizona State Sun Devils	46.700	46.900	43.900	46.150	183.650
5	Florida Gators	45.400	46.300	44.450	46.050	182.200
6	Alabama Crimson Tide	45.100	46.000	44.650	45.050	180.800
7	Penn State Nittany Lions	45.950	45.650	44.150	43.700	179.450
8	Washington Huskies	45.100	43.900	44.350	45.200	178.550
9	Georgia Gym Dogs	45.050	44.350	43.350	44.850	177.600
10	Arizona Wildcats	45.100	45.800	41.650	44.350	176.500

== Top Ten Individual All-Around Results ==
Position	Gymnast	Team	Vault (gymnastics)	Uneven bars	Balance beam	Floor (gymnastics)	Total
1	Megan Marsden	Utah	9.650	9.450	9.450	9.350	37.900
2	Lisa Zeis	Arizona State	9.350	9.550	9.450	9.500	37.800
3	Tami Elliot	Cal State Fullerton	9.600	9.650	9.100	9.400	37.750
4	Linda Kardos	Utah	9.350	9.550	9.150	9.350	37.400
4	Elfi Schlegel	Florida	9.350	9.500	9.000	9.550	37.400
4	Penney Hauschild	Alabama	9.450	9.600	9.150	9.200	37.400
7	Donna Kemp	UCLA	9.350	9.500	9.200	9.300	37.350
8	Callie Glanton	Cal State Fullerton	9.550	9.150	9.100	9.300	37.100
9	Lisa Mitzel	Utah	9.200	9.300	9.000	9.450	36.950
10	Terri Eckert	Georgia	9.250	9.450	8.900	9.250	36.850

== Individual Event Finals Results ==
=== Vault ===
Rank	Name	Team	Vault Average
1	Megan Marsden	Utah	9.575
2	Rhonda Schwandt	UCLA	9.325
3	Elaine Alfano	Utah	9.275
4	Callie Glanton	Cal State Fullerton	9.250
5	Pam Loree	Penn State	9.200
6	Kathy McMinn	Georgia	9.150
7	Amy Priest	Oklahoma	8.900

=== Uneven Bars ===
Rank	Name	Team	Score
1	Jackie Brummer	Arizona State	9.700
2	Linda Kardos	Utah	9.600
2	Penney Hauschild	Alabama	9.600
4	Roni Barrios	Cal State Fullerton	9.550
4	Kathy McMinn	Georgia	9.550
4	Tami Elliot	Cal State Fullerton	9.550
7	Karen McMullin	UCLA	9.500
7	Suzy Kellems	Southern Cal	9.500
9	Donna Kemp	UCLA	9.450
10	Elfi Schlegel	Florida	9.400
10	Kelly Chaplin	Arizona	9.400
12	Julie Estin	Alabama	9.350
13	Lisa Zeis	Arizona State	9.250
14	Donita Klein	Cal State Fullerton	8.800

=== Balance Beam ===
Rank	Name	Team	Score
1	Heidi Anderson	Penn State	9.700
2	Lisa Zeis	Arizona State	9.650
3	Linda Kardos	Utah	9.500
4	Penney Hauschild	Alabama	9.400
4	Donna Kemp	UCLA	9.400
6	Barbara Mack	Alabama	9.300
7	Karen McMullin	UCLA	9.200
7	Megan Marsden	Utah	9.200
9	Laurie Carter	Oregon State	8.850

=== Floor Exercise ===
Rank	Name	Team	Score
1	Maria Anz	Florida	9.700
2	Elfi Schlegel	Florida	9.650
2	Kim Neal	Arizona State	9.650
4	Jeanine Creek	San Diego State	9.600
5	Lisa Zeis	Arizona State	9.550
5	Tami Elliot	Cal State Fullerton	9.550
7	Lisa Mitzel	Utah	9.500
8	Lisa Shirk	Pittsburgh	9.100
9	Sabrina Tinti	UCLA	8.950

== See also ==
- 1984 NCAA men's gymnastics championships
