= 1986 NCAA women's gymnastics championships =

American college gymnastics competition

- Venue: O'Connell Center
- Location: Gainesville, Florida
- Dates: April 18–19, 1986
- Teams: 10

Champions
- Women: Penney Hauschild, Alabama (38.200)
- Team: Utah (5th)

The 1986 NCAA women's gymnastics championships were contested at the fifth annual tournament hosted by the NCAA to determine the individual and team national champions of women's gymnastics among its member programs in the United States.

The competition took place from April 18–19 in Gainesville, Florida, hosted by the University of Florida at the O'Connell Center.

Four-time defending champions Utah again won the team title, the Red Rocks' fifth NCAA title. Nevertheless, this was the first championship where a record team score was not set.

Penney Hauschild, from Alabama, defended her individual all-around championship.

== Team Results ==
Position	Team	Vault (gymnastics)	Uneven bars	Balance beam	Floor (gymnastics)	Total
1	Utah Red Rocks	47.250	46.700	46.500	46.500	186.950
2	Arizona State Sun Devils	47.600	46.350	46.350	46.400	186.700
3	Alabama Crimson Tide	47.200	46.600	46.800	45.750	186.350
4	Georgia Gym Dogs	46.450	46.250	45.950	45.400	184.050
5	Cal State Fullerton Titans	46.750	46.750	45.700	45.850	185.000
6	Penn State Nittany Lions	46.500	45.900	44.550	45.750	182.700
7	UCLA Bruins	45.600	45.600	45.200	45.300	181.700
8	Florida Gators	46.250	45.350	45.250	44.450	181.300
9	LSU Tigers	46.550	44.750	44.700	44.550	180.550
10	Ohio State Buckeyes	45.900	43.850	42.600	43.450	177.800

== Top Ten Individual All-Around Results ==
Position	Gymnast	Team	Vault (gymnastics)	Uneven bars	Balance beam	Floor (gymnastics)	Total
1	Penney Hauschild	Alabama	9.600	9.500	9.600	9.500	38.200
1	Jackie Brummer	Arizona State	9.600	9.650	9.650	9.300	38.200
3	Tami Elliot	Cal State Fullerton	9.500	9.550	9.550	9.100	37.700
4	Gigi Zosa	UCLA	9.300	9.550	9.500	9.300	37.650
5	Julie Estin	Alabama	9.450	9.400	9.350	9.300	37.500
5	Kim Neal	Arizona State	9.550	9.500	9.050	9.400	37.500
5	Pam Loree	Penn State	9.650	9.250	9.350	9.250	37.500
8	Taunia Rogers	Cal State Fullerton	9.350	9.250	9.350	9.450	37.400
9	Sandy Sobotka	Utah	9.400	9.200	9.500	9.200	37.300
10	Elfi Schlegel	Florida	9.350	9.350	9.450	9.100	37.250
10	Lucy Wener	Georgia	9.050	9.700	9.200	9.300	37.250

== Individual Event Finals Results ==
=== Vault ===
Rank	Name	Team	Vault Average
1	Kim Neal	Arizona State	9.450
1	Pam Loree	Penn State	9.450
3	Penney Hauschild	Alabama	9.425
4	Mary Kay Brown	Arizona	9.400
5	Shari Mann	Arizona State	9.250
6	Kelly Good	Alabama	9.150

=== Uneven Bars ===
Rank	Name	Team	Score
1	Lucy Wener	Georgia	9.800
2	Gigi Zosa	UCLA	9.600
3	Penney Hauschild	University of Alabama	9.550
3	Jackie Brummer	Arizona State	9.550
5	Tami Elliot	Cal State Fullerton	9.500
6	Kim Neal	Arizona State	9.400

=== Balance Beam ===
Rank	Name	Team	Score
1	Jackie Brummer	Arizona State	9.800
2	Gigi Zosa	UCLA	9.650
3	Lisa Zeis	Arizona State	9.600
4	Yumi Mordre	Washington	9.500
4	Julie Klick	Georgia	9.500
4	Tami Elliot	Cal State Fullerton	9.500

=== Floor Exercise ===
Rank	Name	Team	Score
1	Lisa Zeis	Arizona State	9.700
1	Penney Hauschild	University of Alabama	9.700
3	Mary Kay Brown	University of Arizona	9.500
4	Gina Banales	Georgia	9.450
5	Lynne Lederer	University of Utah	9.100
5	Paula Maheu	Georgia	9.100

== See also ==
- 1986 NCAA men's gymnastics championships
