= 1982 NCAA women's gymnastics championships =

Gymnastics competition

- Venue: Special Events Center
- Location: Salt Lake City, Utah
- Dates: March 26–27, 1982
- Teams: 10

Champions
- Women: Sue Stednitz, Utah (37.2)
- Team: Utah (1st)

The 1982 NCAA women's gymnastics championships were contested at the first annual tournament hosted by the NCAA to determine the individual and team national champions of women's gymnastics among its member programs in the United States.

Featuring ten teams, it was the first championship for women organized solely by the NCA. The AIAW had sponsored its own championships since 1969 and would also sponsor its own 1982 tournament, although this would be its last before the NCAA assumed full control of all women's collegiate gymnastics championships for 1983.

The competition took place from March 26–27 in Salt Lake City, Utah, hosted by the University of Utah at the Special Events Center.

== Team Results ==
Position	Team	Vault (gymnastics)	Uneven bars	Balance beam	Floor (gymnastics)	Total
1	Utah Red Rocks	37.1505	36.800	37.550	37.100	148.600
2	Cal State Fullerton Titans	36.600	36.400	35.150	36.000	144.150
3	Penn State Nittany Lions	35.800	35.850	35.900	35.550	143.100
4	Oregon State Beavers	35.500	35.950	35.300	36.250	143.000
5	Arizona State Sun Devils	35.650	35.850	35.600	35.850	142.950
6	UCLA Bruins	35.650	36.000	34.550	36.200	142.400
7	Florida Gators	36.050	34.800	34.400	35.650	140.900
8	Nebraska Cornhuskers	35.300	35.150	33.100	34.550	138.100
9	Oklahoma State Cowgirls	33.800	34.100	34.000	35.300	137.200
10	Michigan Wolverines	34.300	34.600	33.000	35.000	136.900

== Top Ten Individual All-Around Results ==
Position	Gymnast	Team	Vault (gymnastics)	Uneven bars	Balance beam	Floor (gymnastics)	Total
1	Sue Stednitz	Utah	9.30	9.20	9.40	9.30	37.20
2	Christa Canary	Utah	9.15	9.25	9.45	9.25	37.10
3	Mary Ayotte-Law	Oregon State	9.00	9.35	9.15	9.35	36.85
3	Heidi Anderson	Penn State	9.20	9.20	8.95	9.50	36.85
5	Jeri Cameron	Arizona State	9.10	9.40	9.15	9.05	36.70
6	Sharon Shapiro	UCLA	9.40	8.70	9.45	9.10	36.65
7	Suzy Kellems	Southern Cal	9.15	9.25	8.40	9.60	36.40
8	Julie Goewey	Cal State Fullerton	9.05	8.90	9.20	9.20	36.35
9	Merilyn Chapman	Stanford	9.30	8.95	8.90	9.10	36.25
9	Ann Woods	Florida	9.00	8.95	9.30	9.00	36.25

== Individual Event Finals Results ==
=== Vault ===
Rank	Name	Team	Day 1 Score	Day 2 Score	Total
1	Elaine Alfano	Utah	9.500	9.400	18.900
2	Sharon Shapiro	UCLA	9.400	8.925	18.325
3	Ann Woods	Florida	9.300	8.975	18.275
4	Megan McCunniff	Utah	9.200	9.000	18.200
5	Sandra Smith	LSU	9.500	8.675	18.175
5	Sue Stednitz	Utah	9.300	8.875	18.175
7	Karen Martino	Cal State Fullerton	9.200	8.950	18.150
8	Mary Ayotte-Law	Oregon State	9.200	8.450	17.650
9	Kristin Weber	Cal State Fullerton	9.200	8.400	17.600

=== Uneven Bars ===
Rank	Name	Team	Day 1 Score	Day 2 Score	Total
1	Lisa Shirk	Pittsburgh	9.450	9.550	19.00
2	Jeri Cameron	Arizona State	9.400	9.400	18.800
3	Heidi Anderson	Penn State	9.350	9.300	18.650
4	Julie Garrett	Alabama	9.400	9.000	18.400
4	Jeanine Creek	Cal State Fullerton	9.300	9.100	18.400
5	Anne Kitabayashi	UCLA	9.350	7.400	16.750

=== Balance Beam ===
Rank	Name	Team	Day 1 Score	Day 2 Score	Total
1	Sue Stednitz	Utah	9.400	9.300	18.700
2	Megan McCunniff	Utah	9.600	9.050	18.650
2	Christa Canary	Utah	9.450	9.200	18.650
4	Sharon Shapiro	UCLA	9.450	8.550	18.000
5	Julie Goewey	Cal State Fullerton	9.200	8.650	17.850
6	Merilyn Chapman	Stanford	9.300	8.400	17.700

=== Floor Exercise ===
Rank	Name	Team	Day 1 Score	Day 2 Score	Total
1	Mary Ayotte-Law	Oregon State	9.500	9.350	18.850
2	Heidi Anderson	Penn State	9.350	9.400	18.750
3	Suzy Kellems	Southern Cal	9.600	9.000	18.600
3	Linda Kardos	Utah	9.400	9.200	18.600
5	Christa Canary	Utah	9.350	9.100	18.350
6	Sue Stednitz	Utah	9.300	8.700	18.000

== See also ==
- AIAW gymnastics championships
- 1982 NCAA men's gymnastics championships
