= 1983 NCAA women's gymnastics championships =

American college gymnastics competition

- Venue: Special Events Center
- Location: Salt Lake City, Utah
- Dates: April 8–9, 1983
- Teams: 10

Champions
- Women: Megan McCunniff, Utah (37.500)
- Team: Utah (2nd)

The 1983 NCAA women's gymnastics championships were contested at the second annual tournament hosted by the NCAA to determine the individual and team national champions of women's gymnastics among its member programs in the United States.

This was the first competition after the NCAA took full control of women's collegiate gymnastics from the AIAW, whose final standalone championships had been held in 1982.

The competition took place from April 8–9 in Salt Lake City, Utah, hosted by the University of Utah at the Special Events Center.

== Team Results ==
Position	Team	Vault (gymnastics)	Uneven bars	Balance beam	Floor (gymnastics)	Total
1	Utah Red Rocks	46.450	46.250	45.300	45.650	184.650
2	Arizona State Sun Devils	46.550	45.100	45.600	46.050	183.300
3	Cal State Fullerton Titans	44.650	44.950	44.250	45.400	179.250
4	Alabama Crimson Tide	44.900	45.500	44.150	44.500	179.050
5	Florida Gators	45.500	44.250	44.100	44.500	177.850
6	LSU Tigers	45.250	44.300	43.350	44.900	177.800
6	UCLA Bruins	44.600	45.250	43.800	44.150	177.800
8	Ohio State Buckeyes	43.900	44.800	43.650	44.300	176.650
9	Oregon State Beavers	43.400	43.600	44.400	42.150	173.550
10	Nebraska Cornhuskers	43.200	39.400	41.200	41.175	165.550

== Top Ten Individual All-Around Results ==
Position	Gymnast	Team	Vault (gymnastics)	Uneven bars	Balance beam	Floor (gymnastics)	Total
1	Megan McCunniff	Utah	9.500	9.400	9.150	9.450	37.500
2	Jeri Cameron	Arizona State	9.500	9.350	9.200	9.300	37.350
3	Kathy McMinn	Georgia	9.600	8.850	9.000	9.450	36.900
4	Lisa Mitzel	Utah	9.100	9.000	9.550	9.200	36.850
5	Elaine Alfano	Utah	9.600	9.300	8.750	9.000	36.650
5	Elfi Schlegel	Florida	9.200	9.150	9.000	9.300	36.650
5	Taunia Rogers	Cal State Fullerton	9.450	9.300	8.450	9.450	36.650
8	Donna Kemp	UCLA	9.150	9.200	9.050	9.200	36.600
9	Lisa Zeis	Arizona State	9.200	8.250	9.750	9.300	36.500
9	Suzy Kellems	Southern Cal	9.400	9.500	8.500	9.100	36.500
9	Sandra Smith	LSU	9.600	9.350	8.350	9.200	36.500

== Individual Event Finals Results ==
=== Vault ===
Rank	Name	Team	Vault Average
1	Elaine Alfano	Utah	9.600
2	Sandra Smith	LSU	9.550
3	Kim Neal	Arizona State	9.500
4	Jeri Cameron	Arizona State	9.450
5	Suzy Kellems	Southern Cal	9.430
6	Megan McCunniff	Utah	9.250
7	Taunia Rogers	Cal State Fullerton	9.150
8	Kathy McMinn	Georgia	9.130

=== Uneven Bars ===
Rank	Name	Team	Score
1	Jeri Cameron	Arizona State	9.500
2	Karen Beer	Denver	9.400
2	Tracy Rinker	Ohio State	9.400
2	Jackie Brummer	Arizona State	9.400
2	Megan McCunniff	Utah	9.400
6	Suzy Kellems	Southern Cal	9.350
7	Roni Barrios	Cal State Fullerton	9.300
8	Sandra Smith	LSU	9.100
9	Kathy Temple	Ohio State	9.000
10	Julie Goewey	Cal State Fullerton	8.750

=== Balance Beam ===
Rank	Name	Team	Score
1	Julie Goewey	Cal State Fullerton	9.700
2	Linda Kardos	Utah	9.650
3	Lisa Zeis	Arizona State	9.500
4	Lisa Mitzel	Utah	9.400
5	Laurie Carter	Oregon State	9.350
6	Kym Fischler	Cal State Fullerton	9.100
7	Jeri Cameron	Arizona State	9.000
8	Bev Fry	Alabama	8.500
9	Cindy Paul	Utah	8.350

=== Floor Exercise ===
Rank	Name	Team	Score
1	Kim Neal	Arizona State	9.600
2	Lisa Zeis	Arizona State	9.500
2	Taunia Rogers	Cal State Fullerton	9.500
4	Jeri Cameron	Arizona State	9.450
5	Elfi Schlegel	Florida	9.350
5	Kathy McMinn	Georgia	9.350
7	Megan McCunniff	Utah	9.050
8	Roni Barrios	Cal State Fullerton	0.00

== See also ==
- 1983 NCAA men's gymnastics championships
