= 1990 NCAA women's gymnastics championships =

American college gymnastics competition

- Venue: Gill Coliseum
- Location: Corvallis, Oregon
- Dates: April 20–21, 1990
- Teams: 12

Champions
- Women: Dee Dee Foster, Alabama (39.300)
- Team: Utah Red Rocks (6th)

The 1990 NCAA women's gymnastics championships were contested at the ninth annual meet hosted by the NCAA to determine the individual and team national champions of women's gymnastics among its member programs in the United States.

A total of twelve teams competed for the championship, which took place from April 20–21 at the Gill Coliseum at Oregon State University in Corvallis, Oregon.

Utah Red Rocks won the team title, their sixth overall and first since 1986.

Dee Dee Foster, from Alabama, won the individual title.

== Team Results ==
Position	Team	Vault (gymnastics)	Uneven bars	Balance beam	Floor (gymnastics)	Total
1	Utah Red Rocks	48.975	49.050	48.050	48.825	194.900
2	Alabama Crimson Tide	49.050	48.725	48.725	48.075	194.575
3	Georgia Gym Dogs	48.125	48.675	47.850	48.575	193.225
4	UCLA Bruins	48.350	48.300	48.575	47.875	193.100
5	Nebraska Cornhuskers	48.375	48.675	47.175	48.00	192.225
6	LSU Tigers	48.400	48.400	47.050	48.250	192.100
7	Oregon State Beavers	48.075	47.650	46.625	47.600	189.950
8	Cal State Fullerton Titans	47.300	47.600	46.900	47.900	189.700
9	Towson State Tigers	46.875	47.425	46.775	46.900	187.975
10	Florida Gators	47.025	47.425	45.875	46.850	187.175
10	Arizona Wildcats	47.875	47.550	45.700	46.050	187.175
12	Ohio State Buckeyes	46.650	46.825	44.375	45.800	183.650
