= 1988 NCAA women's gymnastics championships =

American college gymnastics competition

- Venue: Jon M. Huntsman Center
- Location: Salt Lake City, Utah
- Dates: April 22–23, 1988
- Teams: 12

Champions
- Women: Kelly Garrison-Steves, Oklahoma (38.900)
- Team: Alabama (1st)

The 1988 NCAA women's gymnastics championships were contested at the seventh annual meet hosted by the NCAA to determine the individual and team national champions of women's gymnastics among its member programs in the United States.

A total of twelve teams competed for the championship, which took place April 22–23 at the Jon M. Huntsman Center at the University of Utah in Salt Lake City, Utah.

Alabama won the team title, their first.

Kelly Garrison-Steves from Oklahoma again won the individual all-around title, her second consecutive championship.

== Summary ==
Georgia entered the competition as the defending champions while six-time champion Utah played host. UCLA finished the regular season unbeaten and Pac-10 Champions, while SEC Champions Alabama garnered the top overall seed. UCLA was ranked number 1 throughout most of the regular season but suffered a poor showing at regionals which resulted in them receiving a low seventh seed at the championship. The Bruins' regional also saw star gymnast Tanya Service suffer a dislocated elbow. Alabama won the title with a record score of 190.050, giving coach Sarah Patterson her first of six titles.

== Team Results ==
Position	Team	Vault (gymnastics)	Uneven bars	Balance beam	Floor (gymnastics)	Total
1	Alabama Crimson Tide	47.200	47.750	47.650	47.450	190.050
2	Utah Red Rocks	47.750	47.350	47.350	47.050	189.500
3	UCLA Bruins	47.750	47.050	46.850	47.150	188.800
4	LSU Tigers	47.600	46.150	47.100	47.050	187.900
5	Georgia Gym Dogs	47.900	46.800	45.900	46.200	186.800
6	Florida Gators	46.700	46.950	45.850	47.150	186.650
7	Oregon State	47.050	46.200	46.750	46.500	186.500
8	Arizona State	46.600	46.500	45.400	46.600	185.100
9	Arizona Wildcats	47.000	46.200	45.850	44.950	184.000
10	Nebraska Cornhuskers	46.900	45.650	44.850	46.150	183.550
11	Penn State Nittany Lions	46.250	45.300	43.250	44.900	179.700
12	Michigan State Spartans	44.850	44.650	44.450	44.850	178.800
