= 1993 NCAA women's gymnastics championships =

American college gymnastics competition

- Venue: Gill Coliseum
- Location: Corvallis, Oregon
- Dates: April 15–17, 1993
- Teams: 12

Champions
- Women: Jenny Hansen, Kentucky (39.500)
- Team: Georgia (3rd)

The 1993 NCAA women's gymnastics championships were contested at the 12th annual gym meet hosted by the NCAA to determine the individual and team national champions of women's gymnastics among its member programs in the United States.

The competition took place from April 15–17 in Corvallis, Oregon, hosted by Oregon State University at the Gill Coliseum.

Georgia won the team championship, their third title overall and first since 1989. The Gym Dogs also became the first program to score 198.0 points in the team competition.

Jenny Hansen, from Kentucky, won the individual all-around championship in what would be the first of her three consecutive titles.

== Team Results ==
=== Session 1 ===
Position	Team	Vault (gymnastics)	Uneven bars	Balance beam	Floor (gymnastics)	Total
1	Georgia Gym Dogs	49.125	49.575	48.275	49.425	196.400
2	Alabama Crimson Tide	48.925	49.200	47.975	49.175	195.275
3	UCLA Bruins	48.375	48.900	48.650	48.200	194.125
4	Oregon State Beavers	48.250	47.550	48.850	48.775	193.425
5	Michigan Wolverines	48.350	48.975	47.100	48.625	193.125
6	Florida Gators	48.050	49.100	47.525	48.275	192.950

=== Session 2 ===
Position	Team	Vault (gymnastics)	Uneven bars	Balance beam	Floor (gymnastics)	Total
1	Utah Red Rocks	49.175	49.475	48.325	49.350	196.325
2	Arizona Wildcats	48.375	48.500	48.575	48.575	194.025
3	Auburn Tigers	48.500	49.075	48.100	48.100	193.775
4	LSU Tigers	49.050	48.875	47.075	48.425	193.425
5	Penn State Nittany Lions	48.175	48.300	47.600	48.625	192.700
6	Arizona State Sun Devils	48.425	48.750	46.875	48.125	192.175

=== Super Six ===
Position	Team	Vault (gymnastics)	Uneven bars	Balance beam	Floor (gymnastics)	Total
1	Georgia Gym Dogs	49.725	49.750	48.925	49.600	198.000
2	Alabama Crimson Tide	49.175	49.025	49.325	49.300	196.825
3	Utah Red Rocks	49.200	48.875	48.450	49.300	195.825
4	UCLA Bruins	48.650	49.225	48.250	48.800	194.925
5	Auburn Tigers	48.725	49.075	48.075	48.850	194.725
6	Arizona Wildcats	48.725	49.075	47.800	48.475	194.075
