= Suzanne Yoculan =

Women's collegiate gymnastics coach

Biographical details
- Born: Erie, Pennsylvania, United States
- Education: Penn State

Coaching career (HC unless noted)
- 1983–2009: University of Georgia

Head coaching record
- Overall: 831–117–7

Accomplishments and honors

Championships
- 10 NCAA Women's Gymnastics championships (1987, 1989, 1993, 1998, 1999, 2005, 2006, 2007, 2008, 2009) 16 SEC Titles (1986, 1987 1991, 1992, 1993, 1994, 1996, 1997, 1998, 1999, 2001, 2002, 2004–2006, 2008); 21 NCAA Regional Titles (1986, 1988–1996, 1998–2009); 4 Undefeated Seasons (1993, 1998, 1999, 2006) Coached 31 NCAA Individual champions

Awards
- 8 Time SEC Women's Gymnastics Coach of the Year (1986, 1987, 1999, 2001, 2002, 2004, 2008, 2009); 5 Time NCAA Coach of the Year (1987, 1993, 1998, 2006, 2008, 2009)

Suzanne Paige Yoculan is an American former gymnastics coach who was the head coach of the women's gymnastics program at the University of Georgia in Athens, Georgia from 1983 to 2009. During her tenure, she built the Georgia gymnastics program into a national powerhouse and is one of the most decorated coaches in the history of collegiate gymnastics. Along with Alabama gymnastics coach Sarah Patterson, Yoculan was featured in the 2014 ESPN documentary Sarah & Suzanne, about the rivalry of the two coaches and their gymnastic teams.

== Early life and education ==
Yoculan graduated from Penn State University in 1975 with a degree in therapeutic recreation with a dance emphasis.

== Coaching career ==
She was named the head women's gymnastics coach at the University of Georgia on August 24, 1983, and coached her first meet against the University of Alabama Crimson Tide on December 3, 1983. During her 26 years at the helm, Georgia's gymnastics team, the "Gym Dogs," posted a meet record of 831-117-7 (.870 winning percentage). Under Yoculan, the Gym Dogs won 16 Southeastern Conference Championships and 10 NCAA championships, including a run of five consecutive national championships during her final five seasons.

=== Controversies ===
Since 2000, Yoculan has been in a relationship with Georgia Board of Regents member Don Leebern. They were married in Italy in 2009, even though Leebern was still married to another woman. Their relationship has been controversial for several reasons, including the fact that Leeburn is one of the longest-serving members of the Board of Regents of the University System of Georgia.

The UGA Athletic Department self-reported a Level I secondary NCAA rules violation in December, 2004, regarding an all-expenses paid trip to New York City for Yoculan and six seniors from the Gymnastics team. On the trip, all expenses were paid by Leebern and the party flew aboard his privately owned airplane. In response, the SEC stripped the program of one scholarship for one year, and Yoculan received a letter of reprimand, was forbidden from recruiting off campus for one year, and was required to attend a regional NCAA rules seminar.

== Career review and honors ==
- 10 NCAA Women's Gymnastics championships – 1987, '89, '93, '98, '99, '05, '06, '07, '08, '09
- 16 Southeastern Conference Championships – 1986, '87, '91, '92, '93, '94, '96, '97, '98, '99, 2001, '02, '04, '05, '06, '08
- 21 NCAA Regional Titles – 1986, '88, '89, '90, '91, '92, '93, '94, '95, '96, '98, '99, 2000, '01, '02, '03, '04, '06, '07, '08, '09
- NCAA Women's Gymnastics Coach of the Year – 1987, '93, '98, 2006, '08
- Southeastern Conference Women's Gymnastics Coach of the Year – 1986, '87, '99, 2001, '02, '04, '08, '09
- Her teams finished in the Top 3 nationally 19 out of her final 21 years, in addition to qualifying for the "Super Six" (final six NCAA teams) every year since the format was introduced in 1993. Her teams also never missed participating in the NCAA Women's Gymnastics competition.
- 4 undefeated seasons - '93, '98, '99, '06
- Yoculan also produced 306 All-Americans.
