= Joy Selig Petersen =

American gymnast (fl. 1988–1991)

Joy Selig (fl. 1988–1991) is a former gymnast who was inducted into the Oregon State University Sports Hall of Fame in 1997 and the Oregon Sports Hall of Fame in 2010. She specialised in the balance beam and floor exercise.

== See also ==
- Joy Selig (sculpture)
