= Sarah Patterson (coach) =

Biographical details
- Born: Binghamton, New York

Coaching career (HC unless noted)
- 1979-2014: Alabama

Head coaching record
- Overall: 384–88–2

Accomplishments and honors

Championships
- 6 NCAA Women's Gymnastics championships (1988, 1991, 1996, 2002, 2011, 2012) 8 SEC Titles (1988, 1990, 1995, 2000, 2003, 2009, 2011, 2014); 29 NCAA Regional Titles (1983, 1984, 1985, 1987, 1988, 1989, 1990, 1991, 1992, 1993, 1994, 1995, 1996, 1998, 1999, 2000, 2001, 2002, 2003, 2005, 2006, 2007, 2008, 2009, 2010, 2011, 2012, 2013, 2014); Coached 23 NCAA Individual champions Coached 40 SEC Individual champions Coached 4 NCAA Top VIII Award winners Coached 62 athletes to 277 All-American honors Coached 71 athletes with 175 Scholastic All-American honors (since 1991)

Awards
- 4 Time SEC Women's Gymnastics Coach of the Year (1985, 1995, 2000, 2010); 4 Time NCAA Coach of the Year (1986, 1988, 1991, 2002)

Sarah Patterson is a former collegiate gymnastics coach. She served as the head coach of the Alabama Crimson Tide women's gymnastics team from 1979 to 2014. During her tenure, she built the program at the University of Alabama into one of the most successful in the history of college gymnastics.

Patterson graduated from Union Endicott High School in 1974, Slippery Rock State College in 1978, and was named the head women's gymnastics coach at the University of Alabama by then Athletics Director Paul "Bear" Bryant later that year.

Patterson is married to her former assistant coach, David Patterson. The Pattersons have two children, Jessie and Jordan, who was a member of the Alabama Crimson Tide softball 2012 NCAA championship team.

Along with Georgia gymnastics coach Suzanne Yoculan, Patterson was featured in a 2014 ESPN documentary “Sarah & Suzanne" that looked at the rivalry of the two coaches and their gymnastic teams.

== Career Review and Honors ==
- 6 NCAA Women's Gymnastics championships - 1988, 1991, 1996, 2002, 2011, 2012
- 8 Southeastern Conference Championships - 1988, 1990, 1995, 2000, 2003, 2009, 2011, 2014
- 29 NCAA Regional Titles - 1983, 1984, 1985, 1987, 1988, 1989, 1990, 1991, 1992, 1993, 1994, 1995, 1996, 1998, 1999, 2000, 2001, 2002, 2003, 2005, 2006, 2007, 2008, 2009, 2010, 2011, 2012, 2013, 2014
- Southeastern Conference Women's Gymnastics Coach of the Year - 1985, 1995, 2000, 2010
- NCAA Women's Gymnastics Coach of the Year - 1986, 1988, 1991, 2002
- Alabama Sports Hall of Fame (Inducted March 2003)
- In celebration of her career and 6 championships with Alabama, Champions Plaza was built between Coleman Coliseum and Sewell-Thomas Stadium, it is named after Sarah Patterson, head coach of Alabama's six-time NCAA Champion gymnastics team.

“We named this plaza after Coach Sarah Patterson as a way to honor the great success she has enjoyed over the years in the gymnastics program, and the contributions that she has made to the University and the athletics department in general,” UA Director of Athletics Mal Moore said. (Coach Patterson tied Bear Bryant's National Championships at BAMA with her 6th in 2012)
