= Hope Spivey =

Former American gymnast

Theresa Hope Spivey (born July 27, 1971) is a former gymnast. While at Georgia, she won the Honda-Broderick Award as the nation's top female gymnast in 1991. She currently resides in the Valdosta, GA area where she owns a gym. She competed for the United States national team at the 1988 Summer Olympics. She was inducted into the University of Georgia Circle of Honor in 2007 and the Georgia Sports Hall of Fame in Feb. 2015.
