= Missy Marlowe =

American gymnast (born 1971)

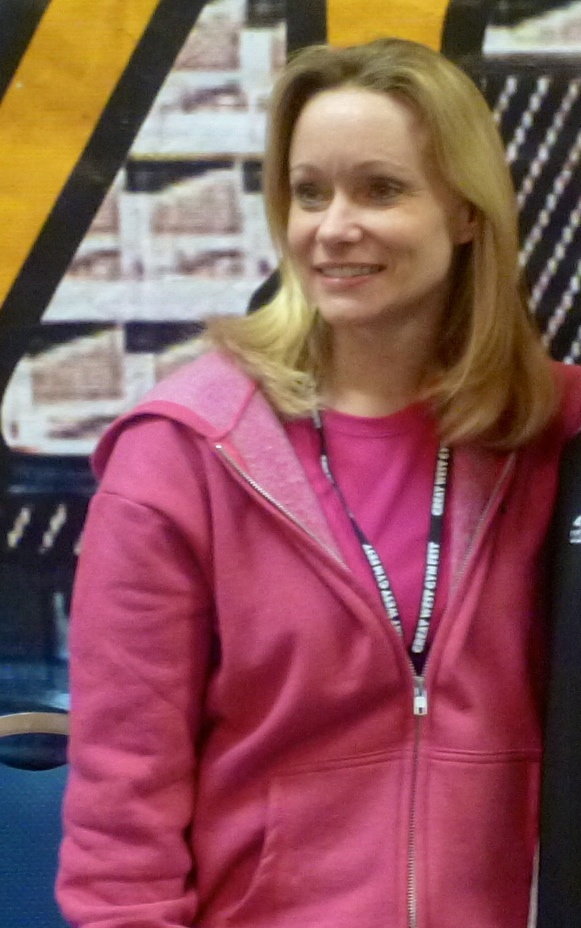
- Marlowe in 2013

Personal information
- Full name: Melissa Anne Marlowe
- Nationality: American
- Born: August 25, 1971 (age 54) Maisières, Belgium

Sport
- Sport: Gymnastics

Melissa Anne "Missy" Marlowe (born August 25, 1971) is an American retired gymnast. She competed at the 1988 Summer Olympics, in Seoul, South Korea.

Marlowe, who grew up in Salt Lake City, competed for the University of Utah gymnastics team and was a five-time NCAA champion. She won the Honda Sports Award as the nation's top female gymnast, and the first ever Honda-Broderick Cup awarded to a gymnast as the nation's top female athlete in 1992 and in 2018 was inducted into the Pac-12 Hall of Honors. She was the first NCAA competitor in women's gymnastics to get a perfect 10 on all four events. In 2025 she was inducted into the USA Gymnastics Hall of Fame.

Her daughter Milan Clausi competed for the University of California, Berkeley gymnastics team.
