= Tanya Chaplin =

American gymnastics coach

- Born: Tanya Service; 1968 (age 57–58); St. Charles, Missouri
- Education: University of California, Los Angeles (1985–90)
- Occupation: Gymnastics coach
- Years active: 1990–present (Coach)
- Employer: Oregon State University

Tanya A. Chaplin (née Service; 1968) is an American gymnastics coach and former artistic gymnast.

== Career ==
=== Gymnastics ===
Chaplin was born in St. Charles, Missouri and began gymnastics when she was 8. By 13, she was coached by Rick Wagner, who encouraged her to move to Eugene, Oregon to attend National Academy of Artistic Gymnastics to pursue elite gymnastics. At 16, she finished 22nd all-around in the 1983 World Artistic Gymnastics Championships.

Chaplin attended UCLA and was a member of the Bruins gymnastics team. In the 1985-1986 season, she and fellow freshman Gigi Zosa led the team to a number of collegiate titles. Her sophomore year, she set an all-around record for UCLA and the Pauley Pavilion, with a score of 38.60 points. That same year, she received a silver medal in floor exercises at the U.S. Olympic Festival, was a member of the US national team, and was the Bruins' highest-scoring gymnast. She also won Pac-10 Gymnast of the Year in 1987 and 1989.

=== Coaching ===
After graduating in 1990, Chaplin worked as an assistant coach for UCLA and the University of Washington women's gymnastics teams.

In 1997, she became head coach for the Oregon State Beavers (OSU) women's gymnastics program. In 2008, she was named OSU Women Sport's Coach of the year.

== Personal life ==
Chaplin's husband Michael is also a gymnastics coach at OSU. They have one daughter.
