= Karin Lichey =

American gymnast

Karin Lichey Usry is an American gymnast (born September 19, 1977 in Cincinnati, Ohio) She attended the University of Georgia from 1996 to 1999, and was part of both NCAA Championship teams in 1998 and 1999. She earned first-team All-America certificates in all five categories both of those years and earned a total of 11 All-America awards in her career. The Southeastern Conference recognized her as its Freshman of the Year in 1996 and Gymnast of the Year in 1999. She won the Honda Sports Award as the nations's top gymnast in 1999.

On February 23, 1996, during her freshman year, she became the first collegiate gymnast ever to score an extremely rare perfect 40.0 in the all-around. As of 2026, she remains the only collegiate gymnast ever to accomplish this feat.

== Career Perfect 10.0 ==
Season	Date	Event
1996	February 11, 1996	Vault
1996	February 23, 1996	Vault
1996	February 23, 1996	Uneven Bars
1996	February 23, 1996	Balance Beam
1996	February 23, 1996	Floor Exercise
1997	January 19, 1997	Vault
1997	January 19, 1997	Uneven Bars
1998	January 17, 1998	Uneven Bars
1998	January 25, 1998	Uneven Bars
1998	February 6, 1998	Uneven Bars
1998	February 14, 1998	Vault
1998	March 21, 1998	Vault
1998	April 4, 1998	Uneven Bars
1998	April 4, 1998	Floor Exercise
1999	January 16, 1999	Uneven Bars
1999	January 22, 1999	Vault
1999	January 22, 1999	Floor Exercise
1999	February 26, 1999	Vault
1999	March 5, 1999	Uneven Bars
1999	March 20, 1999	Uneven Bars

After graduating from college with a Bachelor of Science in Education in 2000, she married Mike Usry and had two children. She has been a volunteer coach for the University of Georgia women's gymnastics team. She is the former Director of Board Relations at the University of Georgia Foundation and Director of the Emeriti Trustees and the Board of Visitors in the Division of Development & Alumni Relations at the University of Georgia. She now works full-time at Southland Organics, a company that she co-founded in 2009.
