= Jenny Hansen =

American stuntwoman and gymnast (born 1973)

- Full name: Jenny Hansen
- Born: Somerset, Wisconsin, United States

Gymnastics career
- Discipline: Women's artistic gymnastics
- Country represented: United States
- College team: University of Kentucky

Jenny Hansen is an American stuntwoman and retired gymnast from Somerset, Wisconsin. Born in 1973, Hansen won three consecutive NCAA All-Around Championships between 1993 and 1995, the only person to ever win three straight All-Around titles. She attended the University of Kentucky from 1992 until 1996 and has since been named to the UK's Athletic Hall of Fame. Hansen won a total of eight national titles and nine Southeastern Conference championships during her collegiate career. She was a three-time winner of the Honda Sports Award in gymnastics. She is a thirteen time All-American and was named the Most Outstanding Gymnast over the past 25 years of NCAA competition in 2006.

== NCAA Championships ==
- All-Around - 1993, 1994, & 1995
- Balance Beam - 1994 & 1995
- Floor Exercise - 1995
- Vault - 1994 & 1995

== Southeastern Conference Championships ==
- All-Around - 1993
- Balance Beam - 1995 & 1996
- Floor Exercise - 1994, 1995, & 1996
- Uneven Bars - 1993
- Vault - 1993 & 1994

== Comeback ==
After retiring from the sport of Gymnastics, Hansen announced plans to try out for the United States women's gymnastics team for the London 2012 Olympics at the age of 38, but did not make the team.
