= Kelly Garrison =

American artistic gymnast (born 1967)

- Full name: Kelly Garrison-Funderburk
- Alternative names: Kelly Garrison; Kelly Garrison-Steves (former)
- Born: July 5, 1967 (age 59) Altus, Oklahoma, U.S.
- Height: 1.55 m (5 ft 1 in)

Gymnastics career
- Discipline: Women's artistic gymnastics
- Country represented: United States (1980–88)
- College team: Oklahoma Sooners (1987)
- Training location: Norman, Oklahoma
- Gym: University of Oklahoma
- Head coach: Becky Switzer

Kelly Garrison-Funderburk (née Garrison, formerly Garrison-Steves; born July 5, 1967) is a retired American artistic gymnast. An elite gymnast for eight years, she represented the United States at the 1988 Summer Olympics in Seoul, South Korea. In addition to her Olympic experience, she participated in the 1983, 1985 and 1987 World Artistic Gymnastics Championships. She was a two-time winner of the Honda Sports Award.

== Early life ==
Garrison was born on July 5, 1967, in Altus, Oklahoma. She started gymnastics training when she was 7 years old, in 1974. In 1985, at the age of 18, she graduated from Altus High School.

== Elite career ==
=== 1980–84 ===
In 1980, at the age of 13, Garrison reached the junior international elite level. She competed at the 1980 U.S. Junior National Championships and won a gold medal on the balance beam. At the USGF International Invitational, she took the bronze on the floor exercise. Two years later, she won the all-around at the 1982 U.S. Olympic Festival in Indianapolis.

Moving up to the senior division in 1983, Garrison finished twelfth at the 1983 U.S. World Trials competition. At the 1983 World Artistic Gymnastics Championships in Budapest, she contributed to the U.S. team's seventh-place finish but did not qualify to any individual event finals.

In 1984, Garrison competed at the American Classic (finishing ninth) and at the U.S. Classic in Niagara Falls, New York (finishing twelfth). However, she finished 10th in the U. S. Olympic trials. After several teammates were injured, Garrison moved to second alternate for the 1984 Olympic Team.

=== 1985–87 ===
In 1985, Garrison finished fifth at the Arthur Gander International and was third in the all-around at the Swiss Cup. At the 1985 U.S. National Championships, she won a gold medal on the beam. She placed second at the U.S. World Trials and made the U.S. team for the 1985 World Championships in Montreal. The team finished sixth, and as an individual, she was eighteenth in the all-around competition.

The following year was less successful for Garrison. She competed at the 1986 Olympic Festival in Houston and placed fourth in the all-around and on the vault, fifth on floor exercise, and sixth on the uneven bars. At the 1986 U.S. National Championships, she placed 39th in the all-around. She also went to a World Cup event in Beijing and placed 13th.

In 1987, she placed fifth in the all-around at the National Championships and made the U.S. teams for the 1987 Pan American Games and the 1987 World Championships. At the Pan American Games, she won gold medals in the team and balance beam competitions and placed third in the all-around. At the World Championships, she contributed to the team's sixth-place finish.

=== 1988 ===
At the 1988 National Championships, Garrison placed second in the all-around, behind Phoebe Mills, and won the gold medal on beam and 3rd on floor. Her finish at Nationals qualified her to the U.S. Olympic Trials in Salt Lake City, where she again placed second behind Mills and secured a spot on the 1988 U.S. Olympic women's gymnastics team.

==== Olympic Games ====
At the 1988 Summer Olympic Games in Seoul, Garrison competed on all four events in the team compulsories and optionals, scoring 38.975 in the former and 38.85 in the latter. The United States placed 4th, behind the Soviet Union, Romania, and East Germany. Garrison also qualified for the all-around and balance beam finals, and placed 16th and 7th, respectively.

Garrison was also involved in a controversy, involving a rarely used rule, that meant the difference between 3rd and 4th place for the United States. During her uneven bars routine in the compulsory round of the competition, the team alternate, Rhonda Faehn, pulled the springboard away after Garrison began her routine, then crouched beside it and remained on the podium until Garrison dismounted. At the time, coaches and alternates were not allowed to stay on the podium when an athlete was performing a routine at the Olympics. Faehn was caught by an East German judge, Ellen Berger, and the team was deducted five-tenths of a point, putting the Americans in 4th place behind the East Germans by three-tenths of a point.

Without the deduction, the United States would have won the bronze medal ahead of East Germany. This would have been the first Olympic gymnastics medal in team competition for a U.S. women's team in a fully attended Olympic Games. (The U.S. women won several medals at the 1984 Summer Olympics in Los Angeles, but those Games were boycotted by the Soviet Union and East Germany.) The president of the International Gymnastics Federation (FIG) at the time, Yuri Titov, apologized to the Americans after the compulsories.

== Eponymous skills ==
Garrison has two eponymous skills on the balance beam that are listed in the Code of Points.

Apparatus	Name	Description	Difficulty (Note: Valid for the 2025–2028 Code of Points)
Balance beam	Garrison	Round-off at end of beam - salto backward tucked with 1/1 turn (360°) to cross stand on beam	F (0.6)
Balance beam	Garrison	“Valdez" swing over backward through horizontal plane with support on one arm	B (0.2)
