= 2016 Florida Gators women's gymnastics team =

American college gymnastics season

2016 Florida Gators women's gymnastics
- Conference: Southeastern Conference
- Record: 3–0 (1–0 SEC)
- Head coach: Jenny Rowland (1st season)
- Assistant coaches: Adrian Burde (10th season); Owen Field (1st season)
- Home stadium: O'Connell Center

The 2016 Florida Gators gymnastics team represented the University of Florida in artistic gymnastics during the 2016 NCAA Division I women's gymnastics season. The Gators competed in the Southeastern Conference (SEC) and hosted their home meets at the O'Connell Center on the university's campus in Gainesville, Florida. The 2016 season was the Gators' first under head coach Jenny Rowland.

The Gators were ranked No. 2 in the 2016 preseason coaches' poll, second to only Oklahoma.

== Previous season ==
The 2015 Gators team came into the 2015 season ranked #1 in the preseason coaches' poll, and finished the season with an 8–2–0 record after losing against conference rivals Alabama (Jan. 23) and Louisiana State (Feb. 20) in away meets. Following the regular season, the Gators placed third at the conference championships, and first at the NCAA Regional in Morgantown, West Virginia. As a result, the Gators advanced to Nationals, their 33rd appearance at the tournament. After tying with Utah for first in Session I, the Gators turned in a 197.850 score in the Super Six and were crowned 2015 National Champions – the third time in the program's history, all of which have been back-to-back. Senior Kytra Hunter took the individual National floor title, and was presented with the Honda Award as a result of her outstanding achievements.

On April 24, 2015 – less than a week after the team's National title – 13-year head coach, Rhonda Faehn announced her resignation from the Gators program after being offered a senior vice president role at the national governing body USA Gymnastics. Soon after, on Saturday, May 9, 2015, it was announced that Auburn assistant coach, Jenny Rowland would be succeeding Faehn as the new head coach of the program. It was also assistant coach Owen Field's inaugural season at Florida. Previously, he held the same role with the Nebraska Cornhuskers women's gymnastics program.

== Schedule ==
Florida announced the 2016 schedule in the September 2015. The 10-week regular season consisted of 5 home and 5 away meets. The Gators hosted SEC rivals Alabama, Louisiana State and Arkansas. They also hosted two non–conference teams, California, Los Angeles and North Carolina. They travelled to SEC schools Auburn, Georgia, Missouri and Kentucky; as well as to Texas Woman's in the first week.

2016 Schedule
Date	Time (ET)	Opponent	Rank	Site	TV	Result	Attendance
Friday, January 8	8:00 p.m.	at Texas Woman's*	2	Kitty Magee Arena • Denton, TX	N/A	W, 196.825–191.450	780
Friday, January 15	6:45 p.m.	#5 UCLA*	3	O'Connell Center • Gainesville, FL	N/A	W, 197.675–196.925	6,511
Friday, January 22	8:30 p.m.	at #8 Auburn	1	Auburn Arena • Auburn, AL	ESPN	W, 197.075–195.900	7,424
Friday, January 29	6:45 p.m.	#5 Alabama	1	O'Connell Center • Gainesville, FL	SECN	W, 198.175-197.525	8,867
Friday, February 5	7:00 p.m.	at #11 Georgia	1	Stegeman Coliseum • Athens, GA	SECN	L, 196.35-196.40	10,224
Friday, February 12	6:45 p.m.	#9 Arkansas	2	O'Connell Center • Gainesville, FL	SECN+	W, 197.45-195.975	7,621
Friday, February 19	7:00 p.m.	at #19 Missouri	2	Hearnes Center • Columbia, MO	SECN	W, 197.75-196.65	1,830
Friday, February 26	6:45 p.m.	LSU		O'Connell Center • Gainesville, FL	SECN		
Friday, March 4	7:00 p.m.	at Kentucky		Memorial Coliseum • Lexington, KY	ESPNU		
Friday, March 11	6:45 p.m.	North Carolina*		O'Connell Center • Gainesville, FL	N/A		

Note: * denotes non-conference rival(s).

== Roster ==
The Gators lost four seniors after the 2015 campaign; Kytra Hunter, Jamie Shisler, Rachel Spicer and Kiersten Wang – all due to graduation and at the ends of their eligibility. However, they welcomed a 5-member–strong 2015–16 incoming freshman class composed of Alicia Boren, Amanda Cheney, Lacy Dagen, Peyton Ernst and Ashley Hiller. Amanda Cheney joined the team as a walk on athlete.

2016 Roster
Name	Height	Year	Hometown	Club
Kennedy Baker	5-0	SO	Flower Mount, TX	Texas Dreams
Alicia Boren	4-11	FR	Franklin Lakes, NJ	North Stars
Claire Boyce	5-6	JR	Arlington, TX	Texas Dreams
Bridgette Caquatto	5-3	SR	Naperville, IL	Legacy Elite
Amanda Cheney	5-5	FR	Orlando, FL	Orlando Metro
Lacy Dagen	5-1	FR	Pleasanton, CA	San Mateo Gymnastics
Bianca Dancose-Giambattisto	5-6	SR	Montreal, Quebec	Gym-Richelieu
Peyton Ernst	5-1	FR	Coppell, TX	Texas Dreams
Ericha Fassbender	5-3	SO	Katy, TX	Stars Gymnastics
Morgan Frazier	5-2	SR	Winter Garden, FL	Orlando Metro
Ashley Hiller	4-11	FR	Pasadena, TX	Stars Gymnastics
Grace McLaughlin	5-2	SO	Allen, TX	WOGA
Alex McMurtry	5-2	SO	Midlothian, VA	Richmond Olympiad
Bridget Sloan	5-1	SR	Pittsboro, IN	Sharp's Gymnastics
