= Vanessa Zamarripa =

American stunt actress and former artistic gymnast

- Full name: Vanessa Ann Zamarripa
- Nickname: Zam
- Born: August 1, 1990 (age 36) Redlands, California, U.S.
- Height: 5 ft 3 in (160 cm)

Gymnastics career
- Discipline: Women's artistic gymnastics
- Country represented: United States; (2010 (USA))
- College team: UCLA Bruins
- Gym: Midwest Twisters
- Former coach: Valorie Kondos Field
Medal record
Women's gymnastics
Representing UCLA Bruins
NCAA Championships
Gold medal – first place	2010 Gainesville	Team
Gold medal – first place	2010 Gainesville	Vault
Silver medal – second place	2011 Cleveland	Team
Bronze medal – third place	2012 Duluth	Team
Bronze medal – third place	2009 Lincoln	All-Around

Vanessa Ann Zamarripa (born August 1, 1990, in Redlands, California) is an American stunt actress and former artistic gymnast. She trained at Midwest Twisters in O’Fallon, IL. Zamarripa won a record 3 JO National AA Titles (2003, 2004, 2007) and a record 3 Vault Titles. She was a member of the UCLA Bruins women's gymnastics team that won the 2010 NCAA National Championship title. She also won an individual NCAA title on vault, total of 19 All-American honors, and became a national team member in 2010 while competing in the NCAA for the UCLA Bruins.

== Career ==
=== Junior career ===
Zamarripa trained at Midwest Twisters in O'Fallon, IL under coaches Mickey Orr, M.S. and Jenny Hayden. She was one of the most accomplished gymnasts in Junior Olympic history, winning nine Level 10 individual national titles from 2003 to 2007 including national records for winning 3 JO Vault titles (back-to-back-to-back) and 3 JO All-Around titles. Her gold medal vault in 2004 was a then JO national record (9.825). She missed a 4th AA Gold in 2005 taking the Silver AA instead. In 2004 she also competed as a Pre-Elite winning V, BB, and AA against some notable Olympic hopefuls including Ivana Hong and Shantessa Pama.

=== NCAA career ===
Zamarripa was one of the most successful gymnasts of the UCLA Bruins. She was the 2010 NCAA Vault Champion and a member of the UCLA Bruins women's gymnastics team that won the 2010 NCAA National Championship title. She scored nine perfect 10 on vault in her NCAA career and was a school-record 19-time All-American. During her senior season in 2013, she was the NACGC/W Division I National Gymnast of the Year and AAI Award winner (awarded to the nation's top collegiate senior gymnast). She was also the West Region Gymnast of the Year and Pac-12 Gymnast of the Year for the second time in her career.

==== Career Perfect 10.0 ====
Season	Date	Event	Meet
2009	January 23, 2009	Vault	UCLA @ Fullerton
2009	February 15, 2009	Vault	UCLA vs Washington, Boise State
2009	February 22, 2009	Vault	UCLA @ Nebraska
2010	February 26, 2010	Vault	UCLA @ Fullerton
2012	January 15, 2012	Vault	UCLA @ UC Berkeley
2012	April 21, 2012	Vault	2012 Super Six Final
2013	February 2, 2013	Vault	UCLA @ Stanford
2013	March 17, 2013	Vault	UCLA vs Arkansas
2013	March 23, 2013	Vault	2013 Pac-12 Championship

=== Elite career ===
Zamarripa was a member of the US national team in 2010. In July 2010, she competed in her first elite meet at the CoverGirl Classics. She placed 5th on the uneven bars, 6th on vault and 7th in the all-around. Later in August, she competed at the US national championships. She became one of the very few gymnast in the world to successfully perform a Cheng vault (round-off flic-flac with ½ turn on – stretched salto forward with 1½ turn off, named after the Chinese gymnast Cheng Fei). She won silver on vault, was 7th on the uneven bars and 8th in the all-around.
