= Sophina DeJesus =

American artistic gymnast and dancer (born 1994)

- Full name: Sophina Saadé DeJesus
- Nicknames: Soph, Sophina the Diva
- Born: October 6, 1994 (age 31) San Jose, California
- Height: 5 ft 0 in (152 cm)

Gymnastics career
- Discipline: Women's artistic gymnastics
- Country represented: United States; (2009 (USA))
- College team: UCLA Bruins (2013–16)
- Club: SCEGA
- Head coach: Valorie Kondos Field
Medal record
Representing United States
Junior Japan International
Gold medal – first place	2009	Floor
- Last updated on: February 15, 2016.

Sophina Saadé DeJesus (born October 6, 1994, in San Jose, California) is an American artistic gymnast and dancer of mixed Puerto Rican and African-American descent. A former elite gymnast, she was a member of the UCLA Bruins gymnastics team from the fall of 2012 to her graduation in 2016.

== Life and career ==
=== 1994–07: Early life, Hip Hop Harry and career beginnings in gymnastics ===
DeJesus was born on October 6, 1994, in San Jose, California, to parents Geraldo 'Jerry' and Maria DeJesus (née Moore). Her mother is African-American and her father is of Puerto Rican descent.

DeJesus was a member of the hip hop group, Mix 5. She participated in both the 2005 and 2006 World Hip Hop International competitions with the group. Also in 2005, she was in an advertising campaign for children's yogurt brand, Go-Gurt. A year later, in 2006, DeJesus and her sister, Savannah, were cast in Discovery Kids show Hip Hop Harry. She appeared in three episodes of Season one and one in Season two. In 2006, she was selected to be in Debbie Allen's Bayou Legend at the Kaufman Hall on the campus of the University of California, Los Angeles – the school she'd go on to attend. Her other ventures have made her appearances on The Ellen DeGeneres Show, The Tom Joyner Morning Show and Maury.

She started gymnastics at the age of 6 at Fallbrook Gymnastics, in Fallbrook, California. After the 2003 season, she moved to train at prestigious Southern California Gymnastics Academy (SCEGA) in Temecula, California, where she would be taught by Kathy Strate, Luis Garcia and Meredith Paulicivic. As a Level 8 gymnast in 2005, DeJesus took both State and Regional titles for her age division, and took nine of ten possible individual titles throughout both meets. A year later, in 2006, she'd moved up to Level 9 where she was fifth in the all-around at States and third at Regionals. As a result of her placement at Regionals, in March 2006, she advanced to the Level 9 Western Championships in Colorado Springs, Colorado. She was tied fourth in the all-around with Claire Boyce.

After the 2006 season, DeJesus moved to SCATS Diamond Elite Gymnastics in Chino, California. For the 2007 season, DeJesus moved up to Level 10, and was the State champion. Although she performed just as well at Regionals, she finished tenth in the all-around, and didn't advance to Nationals. She left SCATS after the 2007 season and moved to Precision Gymnastics. In July 2007, DeJesus participated in the July National Elite Qualifier at the Karolyi Ranch where she competed in the Junior Elite Optional category for 11-13 year olds. As a result, she qualified to the U.S. Challenge on July 28, 2007, in Battle Creek, Michigan. She finished second in the all-around, ahead of 2012 Olympian Alexandra Raisman.

=== 2008–12: Focus on gymnastics, turning elite ===
In March 2008, Sophina participated in the Heart of a Champion Invitational as a Level 10 where she won the all-around title. After qualifying to Junior International Elite status, DeJesus competed at the 2008 U.S. Classic on May 23, 2008, in Houston, Texas. She finished seventeenth in the all-around. Later, in June, she placed fourteenth in the all-around at the U.S. National Championships.

In 2009, DeJesus competed at the American Classic, where she placed third on the uneven bars and fifth in the all-around. This enabled her to compete again at U.S. Nationals, where she placed ninth in the all-around and on beam, and fourth on bars. She was then named to the Junior National Team, and represented the U.S. later that year at the Junior Japan International, where she won gold on floor and finished fourth in the all-around.

In 2010, DeJesus turned senior and competed at the CoverGirl Classic.

By 2012, DeJesus had dropped from Elite back to Level 10, and in 2012 she won the uneven bars title at the SCECGA California Classic, hosted by her gym.

She attended Temecula Valley High School from 2009 until graduation in 2012. While attending high school, she choreographed for the varsity and junior varsity dance teams at the school.

=== 2013–2016: College gymnastics career ===
In 2013, DeJesus began competing for the UCLA Bruins gymnastics program. During her collegiate career, she was a three-time All-American on uneven bars. In 2016, her floor routine went viral on social media. In February 2016, due to her popular floor routine, DeJesus performed on The Ellen DeGeneres Show for the second time.
