= Jennifer Beals =

American actress (born 1963)

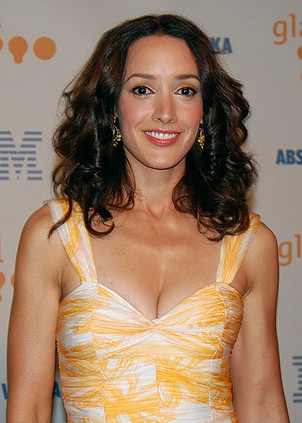
- Beals at the 20th GLAAD Media Awards ceremony in Los Angeles in 2009
- Born: December 19, 1963 (age 62); Chicago, Illinois, U.S.
- Education: Yale University (BA)
- Occupation: Actress
- Years active: 1980–present
- Known for: Alexandra Owens: Flashdance; Bette Porter: The L Word
- Spouses: Alexandre Rockwell (m. 1986; div. 1996) Ken Dixon (m. 1998)
- Children: 1

Jennifer Beals (born December 19, 1963) is an American actress. She made her film debut in My Bodyguard (1980), before receiving critical acclaim for her performance as Alexandra Owens in Flashdance (1983), for which she won NAACP Image Award for Outstanding Actress in a Motion Picture and was nominated for the Golden Globe Award for Best Actress – Motion Picture Comedy or Musical.

Beals has appeared in several films including Vampire's Kiss (1988), Mrs. Parker and the Vicious Circle (1994), Devil in a Blue Dress (1995), The Last Days of Disco (1998), Roger Dodger (2002), The Book of Eli (2010), Before I Fall (2017), and Luckiest Girl Alive (2022). On television, she starred in shows such as The Chicago Code (2011), Proof (2015), Taken (2017), and The Book of Boba Fett (2021). Her portrayal of Bette Porter on the Showtime drama series The L Word (2004–2009) earned her a nomination for the Satellite Award for Best Actress – Television Series Drama. She reprised her role as Bette Porter and served as an executive producer on the sequel series The L Word: Generation Q (2019–2023).

== Early life and education ==
Beals was born and raised on the South Side of Chicago, Illinois, the daughter of Jeanne (née Anderson), an elementary school teacher, and Alfred Beals, who owned grocery stores. Beals's father was Black African-American, and her mother is Irish-American. She has two brothers, Bobby and Gregory. Her father died when Beals was nine, after which she spent a summer at Cheley Colorado Camps in Estes Park, Colorado. Her mother married Edward Cohen in 1981. Beals says that her biracial heritage affected her. Of her youth, she says that she "always lived sort of on the outside", with a feeling "of being the other in society". Beals's first job was at age 13 at an ice cream store, using her height at the time (later 5 ft 8 in [1.73 m]) to convince her boss she was 16 years old.

Two key moments inspired Beals to pursue a career in acting—working on her high school's production of Fiddler on the Roof, and seeing Balm in Gilead (with Joan Allen) while volunteer-ushering at the Steppenwolf Theatre.

Beals graduated from Francis W. Parker School in Chicago, then participated in Goodman Theatre Young People's Drama Workshop. She graduated from Yale University with a B.A. in American Literature in 1987. While at Yale, Beals was a resident of Morse College. She deferred a term so she could perform in the feature film Flashdance.

== Career ==
=== Film ===
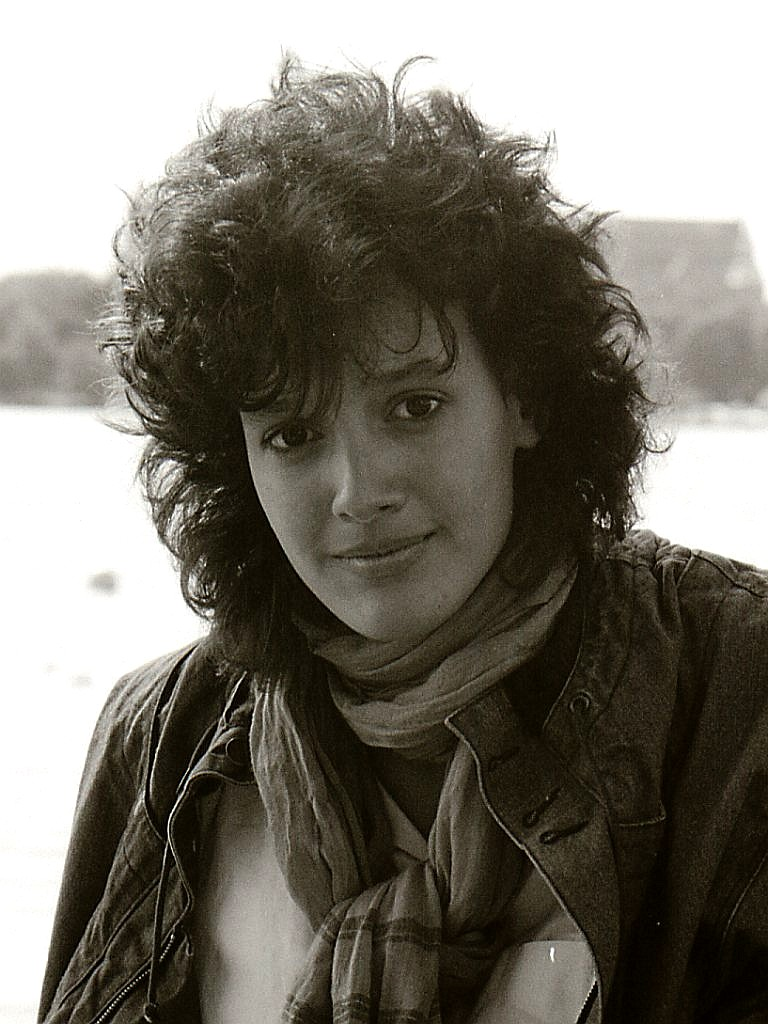
Beals in Sweden during promotion for Flashdance, July 1983.

Beals had a minor role in the 1980 film My Bodyguard, then came to fame with her starring part in Flashdance. The third-highest grossing U.S. film of 1983, Flashdance is the story of 18-year-old Alex, a welder by day and sensual dancer by night, whose dream is to be accepted someday at an illustrious school of dance. Beals was cast for this key role while still a student at Yale. She was nominated for a Golden Globe and the film received an Academy Award for Best Song. Many of Beals's elaborate dance moves were actually performed by dance double Marine Jahan. Gymnast Sharon Shapiro performed the flips as a body double for actress Beals.

After she filmed Flashdance, Beals resumed her studies, making only one film during that time: playing the title role in The Bride with singer-actor Sting, a gothic horror film loosely based on the 1935 classic Bride of Frankenstein, shot during her summer break. She also appeared as Cinderella in an episode of Faerie Tale Theatre, opposite Matthew Broderick. Beals was asked by Joel Schumacher to do St. Elmo's Fire but turned it down, preferring to stay at Yale.

After graduating from Yale in 1987, Beals resumed her acting career, playing the love interest in the boxing film Split Decisions opposite Craig Sheffer. Starring opposite Nicolas Cage, she portrayed a lusty and thirsty vampire in 1989's Vampire's Kiss.

In 1995, Beals and Denzel Washington co-starred in Devil in a Blue Dress, a period film based on a Walter Mosley novel featuring L.A. private detective, Easy Rawlins. Beals plays a biracial woman passing for White. That same year she appeared with Tim Roth in two segments of the four-story anthology Four Rooms, one of which was directed by her then-husband, Alexandre Rockwell.

Rockwell had previously directed her in the 1992 independent film In the Soup, which was a Grand Prize winner at the Sundance Film Festival. In 2003, she played one of the sequestered jury members in the film adaptation of Runaway Jury.

She had a leading role in 2006's The Grudge 2, sequel to the hit horror film of two years earlier. In 2010, Beals reunited with Denzel Washington in the post-apocalyptic action drama The Book of Eli, where she played a blind woman who is the mother of Mila Kunis' character and a consort of a local despot played by Gary Oldman.

Beals portrayed UCLA Bruins gymnastics head coach Valorie Kondos Field, in the film Full Out, about Ariana Berlin.

In 2017, Beals played the role of Samantha Kingston's mother, in the film version of Before I Fall.

In 2019, she played the role of Karen in the romantic film After.

=== Television ===
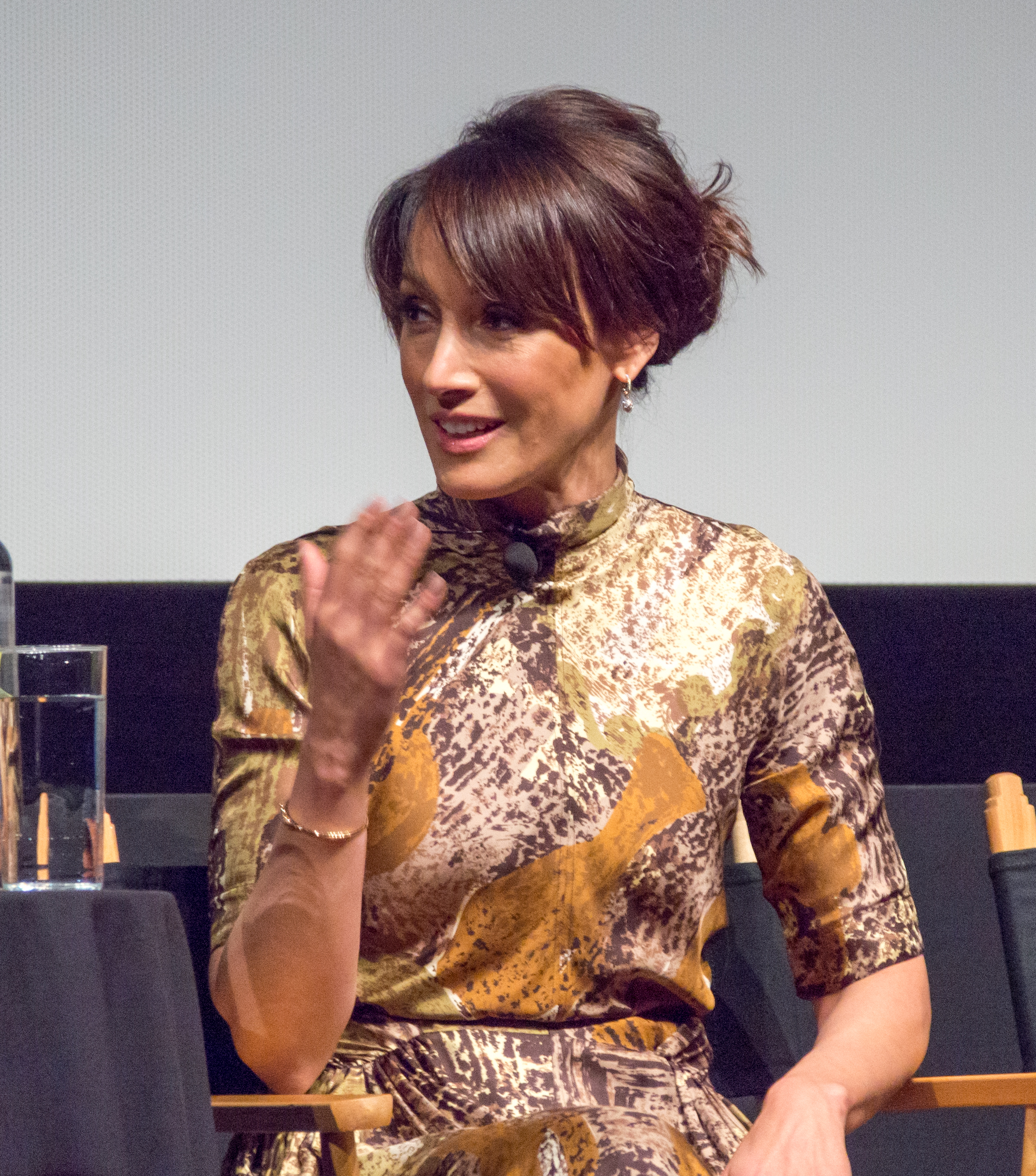
Beals during a panel discussion of In the Soup at the 2018 Tribeca Film Festival

In 1992, she appeared in 2000 Malibu Road as attorney Perry Quinn. It was her first television series; she said she had been leery as she previously had not "found a character I wanted to live with for several years".

In 2004, Beals made a brief cameo in the final episode of Frasier. In 2007, she appeared in the small TV drama My Name Is Sarah, in which she plays Sarah Winston, a sober woman who inadvertently walks in on an Alcoholics Anonymous meeting and is mistaken for an alcoholic, but finds herself falling in love with a recovering alcoholic and—as a result—having to deal with her original deception in joining the group.

Beals starred in Showtime's The L Word, wherein she played Bette Porter, a lesbian, Ivy League-educated, art museum director. At Beals's request, Bette was made biracial, enabling Pam Grier's Kit Porter character to become Bette's half-sister. Beals's initial research for the part focused more on the woman's profession as an art museum director than on her life as a lesbian; "I was much more obsessed by the work that Bette did, because she was so obsessed by the work that she did." The series ran for six seasons and ended in March 2009.

She also appears alongside Tim Roth in Lie to Me, as Cal Lightman's ex-wife, Zoe Landau.

Beals was the female lead in Fox's TV drama The Chicago Code. Her character Teresa Colvin is Chicago's first female police superintendent. The series was canceled after its first season.

Beals turned down an offer to appear on Dancing with the Stars, saying: "I am not a dancer. They asked me and I said 'no.' You could back up a truck to my door filled with cash and I wouldn't do it."

In 2013, Beals signed on for the main role of the ABC drama pilot Westside produced by McG and developed by Ilene Chaiken.

On March 10, 2014, it was announced that Beals would star as Dr. Kathryn Russo in Proof, a TNT supernatural medical drama about a hard-nosed surgeon, struggling with the loss of her teenage son, who begins to investigate that there may be life after death. The series ran from June 16 through August 18, 2015, and was produced by Kyra Sedgwick.

On February 27, 2017, Beals played the leader of a small group of specially trained government operatives for the new series Taken, which serves as a prequel to the Taken film series.

In September 2018, Beals was cast in the role of Sheriff Lucilia Cable for the Swamp Thing series.

In December 2019, Beals reprised her role as Bette Porter in The L Word: Generation Q, the sequel series to The L Word, and also executive-produces the show. She stars alongside fellow The L Word cast members, Katherine Moennig and Leisha Hailey.

In December 2021, Beals appeared in the series premiere of The Book of Boba Fett, a Disney+ series in the Star Wars franchise, where she portrays the Twi'lek Garsa Fwip.

In 2022, Beals appeared as art gallery owner Cassandra Webb in the NBC series Law & Order: Organized Crime for five episodes.

=== Web series ===
Beals is also well known for her support of women's rights. In August 2012, she appeared alongside Troian Bellisario in the web series Lauren on the YouTube channel WIGS. Its first season is a three-episode arc featuring the stories of women in the army being abused, predominantly by more powerful superiors. The stories focused on frequently unreported cases of sexual abuse and how and why most of the cases went unreported or unsettled. Beals has also appeared in two interviews, discussing her views in relation to Lauren.

In January 2013, Troian Bellisario confirmed on her Twitter and Instagram that she and Beals were filming more Lauren web episodes. Lauren returned on May 3, 2013, with a second season of 12 episodes.

== Personal life ==
While attending Yale, Beals dated future film executive Robert Simonds. She married Alexandre Rockwell in 1986 and divorced in 1996. In 1998, she married Ken Dixon, a Canadian entrepreneur. On October 18, 2005, Beals gave birth to their daughter. Dixon also has two children from a previous marriage.

Beals has described herself as a spiritual person. She has expressed interest in the Bible and Catholicism, as well as Judaism, to which she once considered converting, and is a practicing Buddhist.

She has been a vocal advocate for gay rights, saying, "I think after playing Bette Porter on The L Word for six years I felt like an honorary member of the community." Beals was a Celebrity Grand Marshal at the 2006 San Francisco Pride Parade. In October 2012, she received the Human Rights Campaign's Ally For Equality Award, in recognition of her outstanding support for the lesbian, gay, bisexual, and transgender community.

Beals is a practitioner of kung-fu, sanshou, and kickboxing and is a triathlete.

Beals is a photographer and has had shows featuring her work under her married name, Dixon. In 1989, she spent some time in Haiti photographing the elections. She published a book about her time on The L Word featuring her own photographs.

In 2010, Beals served as the Grand Marshal of the McDonald's Thanksgiving Parade in Chicago, during which she spoke of the two charities important to her: the Matthew Shepard Foundation and Pablove Foundation.

Beals, who is married to a Canadian, became a Canadian citizen in 2022.

== Filmography ==
=== Film ===
Year	Title	Role	Notes
1980	My Bodyguard	Clifford's Friend	
1983	Flashdance	Alexandra Owens	
1985	The Bride	Eva	
1988	The Gamble	Lady Olivia Candioni	
1988	Split Decisions	Barbara Uribe	
1988	Vampire's Kiss	Rachel	
1989	Sons	Transgender	
1990	Dr. M	Sonja Vogler	
1990	The Madonna and the Dragon	Patty Meredith	Television film
1991	Blood and Concrete	Mona	
1992	In the Soup	Angelica Pena	
1992	Terror Stalks the Class Reunion	Virginia	Television film
1992	Indecency	Ellie Shaw	Television film
1992	Day of Atonement	Joyce Ferranti	
1993	Night Owl	Julia	Television film
1993	Caro diario	Herself	
1994	Mrs. Parker and the Vicious Circle	Gertrude Benchley	
1994	Dead on Sight	Rebecca Darcy	
1994	The Search for One-eye Jimmy	Ellen	
1995
1995	Arabian Knight	Princess Yum-Yum	Voice
1995	Devil in a Blue Dress	Daphne Monet	
1995	Let It Be Me	Emily Taylor	
1995	Four Rooms	Angela	
1997	The Twilight of the Golds	Suzanne Stein	Television film
1997	Wishful Thinking	Elizabeth	
1998	The Prophecy II	Valerie Rosales	Video
1998	The Spree	Xinia Kelly	Television film
1998	The Last Days of Disco	Nina Moritz	
1999	Turbulence 2: Fear of Flying	Jessica	
1999	Something More	Lisa	
1999	Body and Soul	Gina	Television film
2000	A House Divided	Amanda Dickson	Television film
2000	Militia	Julie Sanders	
2001	The Big House	Lorraine Brewster	Television film
2001	The Anniversary Party	Gina Taylor	
2001	After the Storm	Mrs. Gavotte	Television film
2001	Out of Line	Parole Officer Jenny Capitanas	
2001	The Feast of All Saints	Dolly Rose	Television film
2002	13 Moons	Suzi	
2002	Roger Dodger	Sophie	
2002	They Shoot Divas, Don't They?	Sloan McBride	Television film
2003	Without Malice	Samantha Wilkes	Television film
2003	Runaway Jury	Vanessa Lembeck	
2004	Catch That Kid	Molly Phillips	
2005	Break a Leg	Juliet	
2005	Desolation Sound	Elizabeth Storey	
2006	The Grudge 2	Patricia "Trish" Kimble	
2006	Troubled Waters	Special Agent Jennifer Beck	
2007	My Name Is Sarah	Sarah Winston	Television film
2009	Queen to Play	L'Américaine	
2010	The Book of Eli	Claudia	
2010	A Night for Dying Tigers	Melanie	
2010	The Night Before the Night Before Christmas	Angela Fox	Television film
2012	Widow Detective	Lainey	Television film
2013	Cinemanovels	Clementine	
2014	A Wife's Nightmare	Liz Michaels	Television film
2015	Full Out	Coach Valorie Kondos-Field	
2015	The Laws of the Universe Part 0	Inkar	Voice
2016	Manhattan Night	Lisa Wren	
2017	Before I Fall	Mrs. Kingston	
2018	The White Orchid	Vivian	
2019	After	Karen Scott	
2020	Ali's Realm	Principal Dawson	Short
2022	Luckiest Girl Alive	Lolo Vincent	
TBA	Hello Out There †	Judith	Post-production

=== Television ===
Year	Title	Role	Notes
1985	Faerie Tale Theatre	Cinderella	Episode: "Cinderella"
1992	2000 Malibu Road	Perry Quinn	Main cast
1997	The Outer Limits	Robin Dysart	Episode: "Bodies of Evidence"
1997–98	Nothing Sacred	Justine Madsen Judd	Recurring role
1999	The Hunger	Jane	Episode: "And She Laughed"
2000	E! True Hollywood Story	Herself	Episode: "Flashdance"
2000	Where Are They Now?	Herself	Episode: "Music Movie Stars"
2004	Frasier	Dr. Anne Ranberg	Episode: "Goodnight, Seattle: Part 1 & 2"
2004–09	The L Word	Bette Porter	Main cast
2007	The Directors	Herself	Episode: "The Films of Adrian Lyne"
2007	Law & Order	Sofia Archer	Episode: "Charity Case"
2009–10	Lie to Me	Zoe Landau	Recurring cast (seasons 1 and 2)
2011	The Chicago Code	Teresa Colvin	Main cast
2012	Castle	CIA Agent Sophia Turner	2 episodes
2012–13	The Mob Doctor	Celeste LaPree	Recurring cast
2012–13	Lauren	Major Jo Stone	Main cast
2014	Motive	Sophia Balfour	Episode: "They Made Me a Criminal"
2015	Proof	Dr. Carolyn "Cat" Tyler	Main cast
2016–17	The Night Shift	Dr. Sydney "Syd" Jennings	Recurring cast (season 3), guest (season 4)
2017	The Last Tycoon	Margo Taft	Recurring cast
2017–18	Taken	Christina Hart	Main cast
2019	Swamp Thing	Lucilia Cable	Main cast
2019–23	The L Word: Generation Q	Bette Porter	Main cast
2021–22	The Book of Boba Fett	Madam Garsa Fwip	Guest cast (3 episodes); Silent cameo (1 episode)
2022	Law & Order: Organized Crime	Cassandra Webb	Recurring cast (season 2)
2026	Percy Jackson and the Olympians	Demeter	Guest cast (season 3)
2026–present	NCIS: New York	Robyn Wells	Main cast
TBA	Bishop †	Maggie Loftin	Recurring cast

Key
†	Denotes television productions that have not yet been released

=== As producer ===
Year	Title	Role	Notes
2019	The L Word: Generation Q	Co-executive producer	

== Awards and nominations ==
Year	Awards	Category	Recipient	Outcome
1984	NAACP Image Awards	NAACP Image Award for Outstanding Actress in a Motion Picture	Flashdance	Won
1984	Golden Globe Awards	Golden Globe Award for Best Actress	Flashdance	Nominated
1996	NAACP Image Awards	NAACP Image Award for Outstanding Actress in a Motion Picture	Devil in a Blue Dress	Nominated
1998	Satellite Awards	Satellite Award for Best Actress – Miniseries or Television Film	The Twilight of the Golds	Won
2001	Satellite Awards	Satellite Award for Best Actress – Miniseries or Television Film	A House Divided	Nominated
2005	Satellite Awards	Satellite Award for Best Actress – Television Series Drama	The L Word	Nominated
2007	NAACP Image Awards	NAACP Image Award for Outstanding Actress in a Drama Series	The L Word	Nominated
2008	NAACP Image Awards	NAACP Image Award for Outstanding Actress in a Drama Series	The L Word	Nominated
