= Pak salto =

Release move performed on the uneven bars in women's artistic gymnastics

- Hangul: 박경실동작
- RR: Bak Gyeongsil dongjak
- MR: Pak Kyŏngsil tongjak

The Pak, or Pak salto, is a release move performed on the uneven bars in women's artistic gymnastics. The move starts with the gymnast hanging on the high bar and facing the low bar, then swinging forwards towards the low bar and performing a straight backward salto to catch the low bar.

The uneven bar transition is named for former gymnast Pak Gyong-sil of North Korea.

== Variations ==
The Pak salto can also be performed with a full twist (called a Bhardwaj salto, after American gymnast Mohini Bhardwaj), which increases its difficulty level.
