= Los Angeles Times Festival of Books =

Book festival in Los Angeles, California

- Genre: Book fair
- Date: Second-to last week of April
- Frequency: Annually
- Inaugurated: 1996
- Most recent: April 18–19 2026
- Next event: April 17–18 2027
- Attendance: ~85,000 (2025)
- Website: https://www.latimes.com/events/festival-of-books

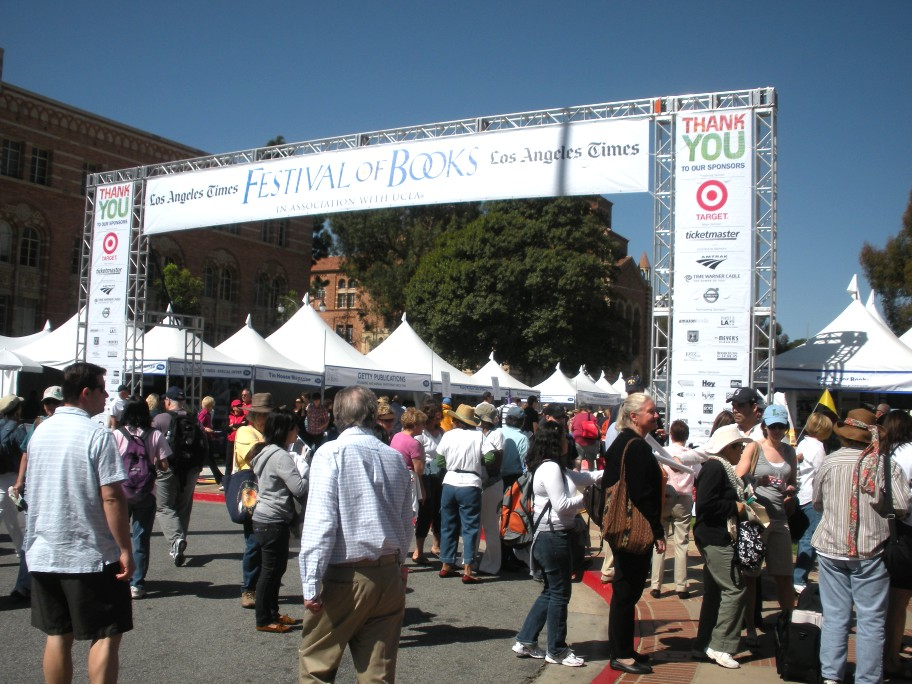
2009 Los Angeles Times Festival of Books, camp18s of UCLA

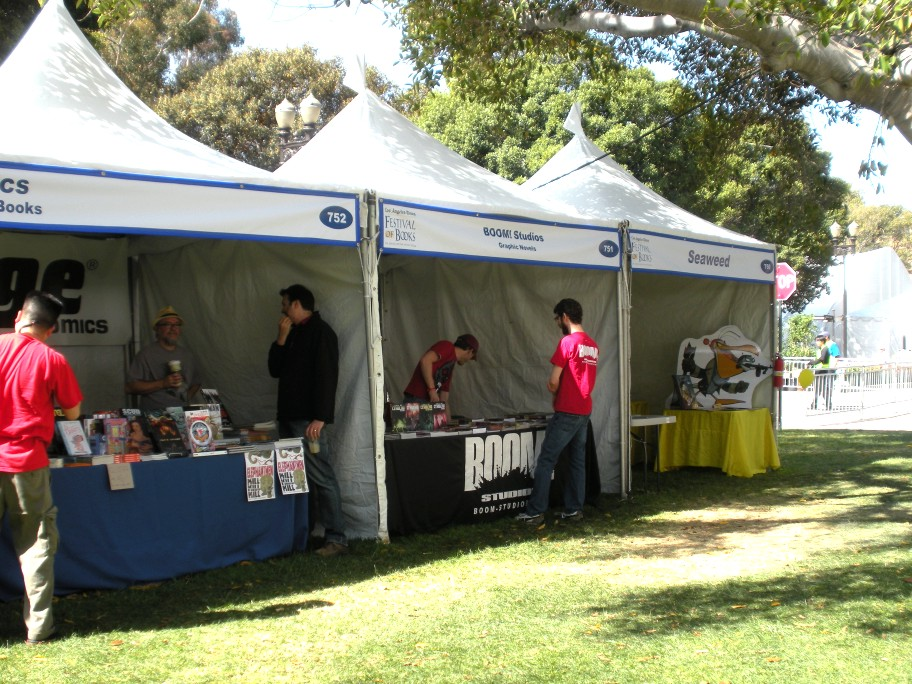
Boom! Studios booth at the 2009 Los Angeles Times Festival of Books, on the campus of the University of California, Los Angeles

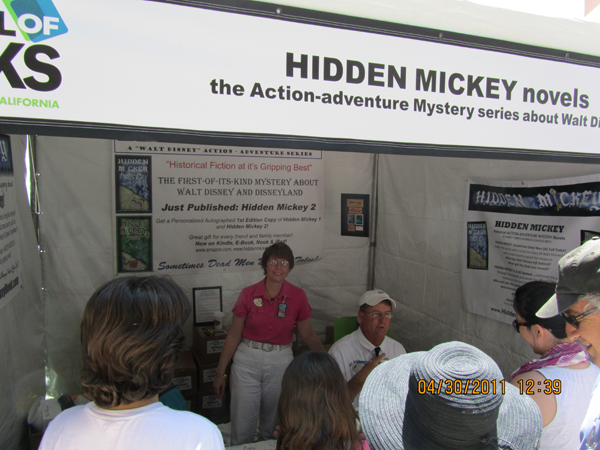
Hidden Mickey booth at the 2011 Los Angeles Times Festival of Books, on the USC campus

The Los Angeles Times Festival of Books is a free, public festival celebrating the written word. It is the largest book festival in the United States, drawing approximately 85,000 attendees in 2025. The festival began in 1996 and is held on the penultimate weekend of April, hosted by the University of Southern California. It features vendors, authors, and publishers. Among the events are panel discussions, storytelling, and performances for children, as well as the Los Angeles Times book prize ceremony. It is well regarded as a celebration of American culture through literature.

== History ==
=== Pre-2009 ===
In a C-SPAN interview, festival co-founders Narda Zacchino explained that she and her colleague Lisa Cleri Reale were discussing other book festivals around the country one day, to which Zacchino stated that the Los Angeles Times, where they both worked at the time, might have enough publicity to pull one off so long as there was enough effort put into it. With a small allocation of funding from each of their departments—as well as the departments of other staff members who committed to their initiative—Zacchino and Reale moved forward with their plans, leading to the first book festival happening in 1996.

The festival was hosted at the campus of the University of California, Los Angeles until 2010. Around that time, University of California officials and event organizers began to disagree on budgetary matters for subsequent iterations of the festival. Event organizers wanted to lower expenditures and thus increase profit through various initiatives which University of California officials did not believe they could accommodate. Since then, the festival has been indefinitely relocated to the University of Southern California. The event was typically held during the last week of April, though it has been moved to the first week to avoid a scheduling conflict with the Fiesta Broadway festival.

=== 2009 ===
The 2009 Festival of Books was held on Saturday and Sunday, April 25 and 26, 2009. More than 100 panel discussions and readings, with nearly 450 authors participating, were scheduled in the various classrooms on both days. Topics included "Mystery: A Dark and Stormy Night," "Young Adult Fiction: Problem Child," "Rock & A Hard Place: Security and American Ideals," "Poof! Our Evaporating Economy," "Fiction: Intimate Strangers," "Mystery: Cold Cases," "History: The Underbelly of California," and "The Soloist from Page to Screen."

Some of the authors and panelists scheduled for panel discussions were James Ellroy, T.C. Boyle, Kevin J. Anderson, Michael J. Fox, S.E. Hinton, Clive Barker, Diahann Carroll, Ray Bradbury, and Gore Vidal. There were a number of areas set up for authors and moderators to sign their books. Additionally, there were many events planned at the various outdoor stages. Hip-hop Harry and Bullseye (the mascot) entertained the children at the Target stage.

Robert Alter, "author of many acclaimed works on the Bible, literary modernism, and contemporary Hebrew literature," received the 29th annual Los Angeles Times Book Prize's Robert Kirsch Award for lifetime achievement. He was in a conversation with Jonathan Kirsch at the festival.

=== 2010 ===
The festival was held on April 24 and 25, with 450 announced authors, including Father Gregory Boyle, Lisa "Hungry Girl" Lillien, Meg Cabot, Mary Higgins Clark, Dave Eggers, James Ellroy, Daisy Fuentes, Louis Gossett Jr., Terry McMillan, Bernadette Peters, Jane Smiley, and Alice Waters.

=== 2011 ===
The annual Los Angeles Times Festival of Books was held for the first time at the University of Southern California on Saturday and Sunday, April 30 and May 1. Some of the authors included Patti Smith, Jennifer Egan, Mary Higgins Clark, Nancy Temple Rodrigue, Nick Flynn, and Dave Eggers.

=== 2019 ===
The 2019 Festival was held from April 13 to 14 at the University of Southern California. Highlights included the L.A. Times Book Prize ceremony, where authors Nafissa Thompson-Spires, Francisco Cantu, and Rebecca Makkai won prizes. The spirit of the book festival was broadened and expanded through the L.A. Times Book Club, a new year-round and more intimate forum.

=== 2020-21 ===
Those festivals were held virtually caused by the COVID-19 pandemic before it returned to USC in 2022.

== See also ==
- Books in the United States
