= Luisa Portocarrero =

Guatemalan artistic gymnast

- Full name: Luisa Fernanda Portocarrero Diaz
- Born: May 5, 1977 (age 49) Guatemala

Gymnastics career
- Discipline: Women's artistic gymnastics
- Country represented: Guatemala
- College team: UCLA Bruins (1995–99)
- Club: Sport Seneca
- Head coach: Valorie Kondos Field (UCLA)
- Retired: 1995 of elite representing Guatemala
Medal record
Representing Guatemala
Women's artistic gymnastics
Pan American Games
Bronze medal – third place	1991 Havana	Balance Beam

Luisa Fernanda Portocarrero Diaz (born May 5, 1977) is a Guatemalan artistic gymnast. As an elite level gymnast, she represented Guatemala at the 1992 Summer Olympics, in Barcelona, Spain. In addition to the Olympics, she participated in the 1991 Pan American Games; winning a bronze in the balance beam. She placed as high as twelfth in the world at the 1993 World Artistic Gymnastics Championships also. Throughout her elite career, she trained at Sport Seneca, in Canada. Following her elite career, she competed for the UCLA Bruins gymnastics team, at the University of California, Los Angeles – contributing to the team's first National title in 1997.

== Eponymous skill ==
Portocarrero has one eponymous skill listed in the Code of Points.

Apparatus	Name	Description	Difficulty (Note: Valid for the 2025–2028 Code of Points)
Balance beam	Portocarrero	Free (aerial) walkover forward, landing on one foot in extended tuck sit, without hand support	D (0.4)
