= Hip Hop Harry =

- Created by: Claude Brooks
- Written by: Morgan Wood
- Directed by: Brian Campbell
- Starring: Ali Alimi; Kelly Dolan; Jeremy Washington
- Composer: French Spencer
- Country of origin: United States
- Original language: English
- No. of seasons: 2
- No. of episodes: 26

Production
- Executive producers: Claude Brooks; Martha Ripp; Gelila Asres
- Producer: Josh Zaretsky
- Production locations: Sunset Gower Studios, Los Angeles, California
- Cinematography: Bart Ping; Terry Clark
- Editor: Evan Finn
- Camera setup: Multi-camera
- Running time: 22–30 minutes
- Production companies: C to the B Productions (uncredited); Hip Hop Harry Productions

Original release
- Network: Discovery Kids; TLC
- Release: September 25, 2006 – June 26, 2008

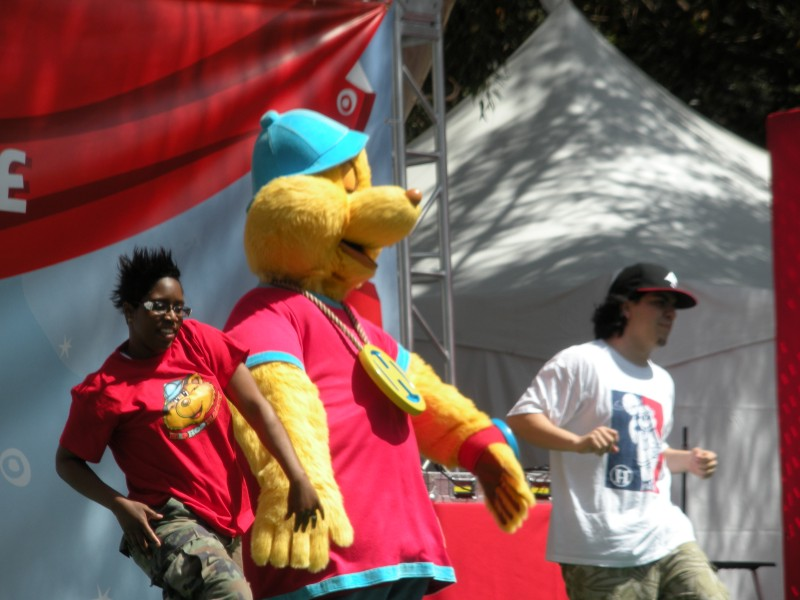
Hip Hop Harry performing at the Los Angeles Times Festival of Books on the UCLA campus

Hip Hop Harry is an American children's television series created by Claude Brooks that aired on Discovery Kids and TLC as part of the Ready Set Learn! block from September 25, 2006 to June 26, 2008. Similar to PBS Kids series such as Barney & Friends (the setting of the show bears resemblance to Barney in nature), Kidsongs, Sesame Street, Hi-5, Teletubbies and The Wiggles, Hip Hop Harry is a live-action program aimed at younger children ranging from around 2–7 years old. The program uses age-appropriate hip hop music and dance to teach social, educational, physical and creative skills.

== Synopsis ==
The show takes place in a learning/play center house known as "Hip Hop Central", where Hip Hop Harry and various neighborhood children learn, play and dance. In between, the kids learn about the main topic of the episode, through a series of physical activities as well as various hip hop song-and-dance numbers; they are sometimes accompanied by adult characters Pinky and Riddles. Near the end of each episode, after they have learned about the topic, they sing and rap the song "I Love to Learn." Then, the kids and Hip Hop discuss what they've learned via questions/answers and watching recaps from the day's episode via a push-button monitor. Each episode ends with the "Hip Hop Harry Dance Circle", where the kids circle up while one of them dances in the center as they shout, "Go! Go! Go! Go! Go!", to an instrumental hip hop track, with Arabian-tinged music. Even Harry dances in the circle too (thus, the kids shout, "Go, Harry!!"). But before they dance, they do a warm-up dance called, "The Harry". After the kids come together to move in the middle, the credits roll.

== Physical appearance ==
Hip Hop Harry is an anthropomorphic rapping yellow furry bear with a red shirt, blue hat, baggy blue jeans, a gold chain with an "H" in the middle and white sneaker shoes with an "H" on each side. He also wears a blue and red wristwatch. The character's appearance is in the general style of hip-hop fashion. His birthday is January 22, as noted in Episode 5.

== Cast ==
- Ali Alimi – Voice of Hip Hop Harry
  - David Joyner – Hip Hop Harry (In-suit performer), Chef Rob (1 episode)
  - Ben Blair – Hip Hop Harry (in-suit performer) (2 episodes), Dr. Vinnie (1 episode)
  - Kefla Hare – Hip Hop Harry (in-suit performer) (5 episodes)

=== People ===
- Ryan Andres – Told jokes in the episode "Finding Your Talent".
- Kelli Berglund – Kelli helped plan a surprise party for Pinky in "Do Your Part."
- Kendra Bracy – Kendra introduced her grandmother from Trinidad in one episode.
- Colton Burton – Colton was one of William's best friends in real life and refused to count the pilots, he did not appear in an episode of Hip Hop Harry without him.
- Kiana Contreras – Kiana played a supporting role in the episode "Get Involved," cheering her sister's Double Dutch team to victory.
- Jake Deanda – Jake was one of the main kids to meet Katie in "Making New Friends."
- Savannah DeJesus – Savannah appeared in "Fancy Footwook" and "Rain Makes Rainbows" with her sister Sophina.
- Sophina DeJesus – Sophina was an aspiring gymnast who enjoys working with her sister, Savannah.
- Kelly Dolan – played Pinky.
- Jeremy Washington – played Riddles.
- Hayden Harrah – Hayden appeared less frequently than other members of the cast, but was a big help during "A B See".
- Jay Jay Harris – Jay Jay is shown in "Pajama Party" and "Just Give it a Try" to be resistant to try new things. He and Riddles got along very well. After a good bongo drum performance, Hip Hop Harry commented that Jay Jay may one day be on a salsa record.
- William May – He appears in several episodes. In "Hip Hop Big Top" he was concerned about being unable to dance with a brace on his leg. With encouragement from Hip Hop Harry and his friends, he realized he could still be a part of the circus.
- Veronicaa Miller – Veronicaa was shown to discover a talent for singing in "Finding Your Talent."
- Katie Petitte – The new girl in "Making New Friends." She takes a hip hop dance class near the end of the series.
- Davide Schiavone – Dancer
- Elizabeth Small – Her zipper served the finishing touch in "A B See."
- Scott Thomas – Scott appears in several episodes. He was featured in "Never Give Up", when he wanted to quit basketball due to a bad day at practice. Hip Hop Harry gave him some encouragement and Scott realized that he should never give up.
- Megan Woo – Megan loved animals and wishes to be a veterinarian when she grows up.
- Tyler White – A young breakdancer with a talent for windmills and the strongman in Hip Hop Harry's circus.
- Mail Carrier Carla – played by Valerie Sheppard, who appears in the episode, "Dream It! Achieve It!"

== Events ==
The cast performed their song Move Those Feet at the Los Angeles Times Festival of Books on April 25–26, 2009 on the Target children's stage on the campus of UCLA.

== Episodes ==
=== Series overview ===
Season	Episodes	Originally released	
Season	Episodes	First released	Last released
1	13	September 25, 2006	November 3, 2006
2	13	April 16, 2007	June 26, 2008

=== Season 1 (2006) ===
No. overall	No. in season	Title	Kids in the episode	Original release date
1	1	"Fancy Footwork"	Sophina, Savannah, Jay Jay, Scott	September 25, 2006
Savannah and Sophina, who are sisters, compete against each other in a dance competition. But they learn that in reality, they're on the same team.
2	2	"When I Grow Up"	Savannah, Jay Jay, Scott, Megan	September 26, 2006
Megan has trouble deciding what she wants to be when she grows up; Harry and the gang learn about different jobs.
3	3	"Words Have Power"	Sophina, Davide, Scott, Megan	September 27, 2006
When Sophina gets mad at Davide, she uses mean words and then learns a lesson about carefully choosing your words. Meanwhile, Megan learns that the best birthday gift to give to somebody is one you make yourself.
4	4	"Making New Friends"	Jake, Veronica, Katie, Davide	September 28, 2006
The kids try to make a new girl named Katie feel comfortable by involving her in their activities.
5	5	"Do Your Part"	Kelli, Kendra, Colton, William	September 29, 2006
Kelli throws a surprise birthday party for Pinky.
6	6	"Never Give Up"	Sophina, Davide, Scott, Megan	October 2, 2006
Scott is discouraged when he doesn't make any shots during basketball practice, so Harry gives Scott a few tips. The kids learn about what happens underwater.
7	7	"Be Creative"	Sophina, Davide, Scott, Kelli	October 3, 2006
Harry and the gang have a costume party at Hip Hop Central. The theme for it is a Marching Band costume party. Scott learns how to be creative about the fact that you can use other things for costumes.
8	8	"We Have Five Senses"	Jake, Veronicaa, Davide, Elizabeth	October 4, 2006
The kids are challenged to perform an activity that uses all five of their senses.
9	9	"Air Air Everywhere"	Kelli, Kendra, Colton, William	October 13, 2006
William has a homework assignment to prove that air surrounds everyone.
10	10	"Wildlife Wendy"	Jake, Veronicaa, Davide, Elizabeth	October 30, 2006
Wildlife Wendy teaches the kids about birds to help Veronicaa get over her fear of birds.
11	11	"Pajama Party"	Jay Jay, Kiana, Savannah, Tyler	November 1, 2006
Harry and the kids throw a pajama party; Wildlife Wendy teaches the gang about nocturnal animals.
12	12	"Rain Makes Rainbows"	Sophina, Scott, Jay Jay, Megan, Savannah	November 2, 2006
The kids are sad about not being able to play outside when it rains, but Hip Hop Harry encourages them not to be sad and helps them learn that rain makes rainbows, and invents a musical way to put them all in order.
13	13	"Dream It, Achieve It"	Elizabeth, Hayden, Veronicaa, William	November 3, 2006
Hip Hop Central wins a reading contest. Special guest appearance by Brutha.

=== Season 2 (2007–08) ===
No. overall	No. in season	Title	Kids in the episode	Original release date
14	1	"My Favorite Things"	Kelli, Colton, Kendra, William	April 16, 2007
William and Kendra share their favorite possessions. William learns how wrong it is to lie.
15	2	"A-B See"	Elizabeth, Hayden, Veronicaa, William	April 17, 2007
The kids find things that begin with each letter of the alphabet. When Elizabeth starts having trouble and is about to call it quits, Hip Hop Harry teaches her to let our friends help solve a problem instead of just giving up.
16	3	"Peas in a Pod"	Kiana, Tyler, Savannah, Jay Jay	April 18, 2007
Farmer Fran teaches the kids about farm life.
17	4	"Make Your Dreams Come True"	Sophina, Davide, Scott, Megan	April 19, 2007
A professional gymnast, a veterinarian, and a children's band visit to explain the concept of hard work.
18	5	"Finding Your Talent"	Ryan, Veronicaa, William, Elizabeth, Katie	April 20, 2007
Veronicaa has trouble deciding what her talent is.
19	6	"Get Involved"	Kiana, Tyler, Jay Jay, Savannah	September 10, 2007
Kiana feels left out, but Hip Hop Harry encourages her to get involved in things that other people do.
20	7	"I Like to Move"	Kelli, Hayden, Sophina, Scott	September 11, 2007
The kids learn about exercise and try new ways of exercise with help from Ms. Kellee.
21	8	"Just Give It a Try"	Ryan, Veronicaa, Elizabeth, Jay Jay	September 12, 2007
The kids make hand puppets for a puppet show, but Jay Jay worries if his will be any good. So Hip Hop Harry encourages him to just try it out because something good might come out of it.
22	9	"Grandma Brooks"	Kiana, Kendra, William, Tyler	September 13, 2007
The kids create a Hip Hop Center Carnival. Also, Kendra's grandmother is from the Trinidadian country, who visits to Hip Hop Central.
23	10	"My Music is Your Music"	Jay Jay, Ryan, Veronicaa, Elizabeth	September 14, 2007
Hip Hop Harry helps the kids appreciate diverse styles of music; Elizabeth and Pinky have a short-term savings plan that inspires long-term goals.
24	11	"Hip Hop Big Top"	Kendra, Kiana, William, Tyler	June 24, 2008
The gang has a circus at Hip Hop Central. William thinks he can't help because he's wearing a boot on one of his feet, but Hip Hop Harry tells him not to worry about that.
25	12	"You Can Dance"	Katie, Jake, Veronicaa, Davide	June 25, 2008
Katie can dance ballet, but she needs to take classes with the other kids to learn hip-hop. Special guest appearance by Shane Sparks.
26	13	"Fun Memories"	Scott, Jay Jay, Elizabeth, Kendra, Kiana	June 26, 2008
The kids are worried they'll never see each other again. Hip Hop Harry encourages them to not be sad because school is out, but rather to use their memories to remember their friends, wherever they may be.

== Legacy ==
In 2017, the character Harry was featured in the YouTube web series Hip Hop Harry Toy Review.

In 2020, Hip Hop Harry had a resurgence in popularity on social media soon after people began to protest following the murder of George Floyd. Clips of the "Hip Hop Harry Dance Circle" portion of the show first resurfaced on Twitter when director and author Matthew A. Cherry posted a short video of this sequence in response to reports that all four of the officers involved in the death had been arrested. The video went viral and many across social media continued to post several dancing clips from the show in celebration of victories in the fight for police reform and racial equality.

== Reception ==
Common Sense Media rated the show a four out of five stars.
