= 2016 NCAA Division I women's gymnastics season =

- Sport: Artistic gymnastics
- Duration: January 2, 2016 – April 17, 2016
- Number of teams: 60

The 2016 NCAA Division I women's gymnastics season took place between January 2 and April 17, 2016.

== Rule changes ==
The only rule change for the 2016 NCAA Women's Gymnastics season, which was enforced for both Division II and III, was the devaluation of the start value for the popular full-twisting yurchenko vault from a Perfect 10 to 9.950.

== National standings ==
Rank	Team	Conf.	RQS	Ave.	High
1	Oklahoma Sooners	Big 12	197.595	197.422	197.925
2	Florida Gators	SEC			
