= Mohini Bhardwaj =

American artistic gymnast (born 1978)

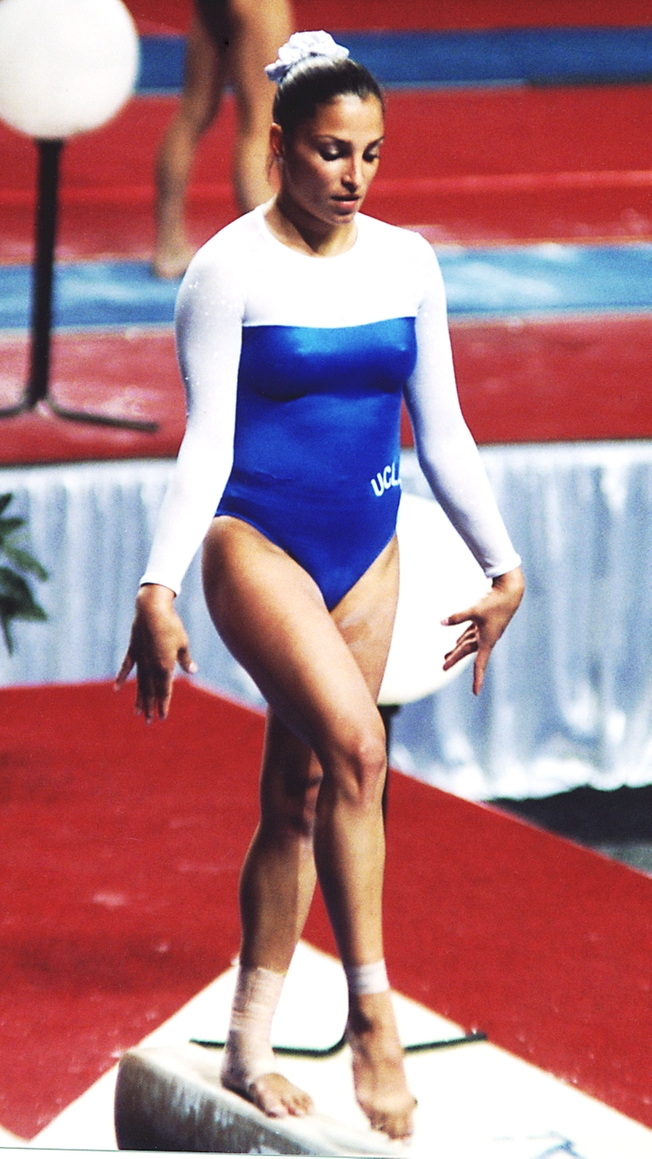
- Bhardwaj on the balance beam at the 2001 USA Gymnastics National Championships in Philadelphia.

Personal information
- Nickname: Mo
- Born: September 29, 1978 (age 48) Philadelphia, Pennsylvania, U.S.

Gymnastics career
- Discipline: Women's artistic gymnastics
- Country represented: United States; (1992–98, 2001–02, 2004)
- College team: UCLA Bruins
- Club: All Olympia Gymnastics Center, Brown's
- Former coaches: Chris Waller, Galina Marinova, Valorie Kondos Field, Rita Brown
- Eponymous skills: Bhardwaj (uneven bars)
- Retired: 2005
Medal record
Olympic Games
Silver medal – second place	2004 Athens	Team
World Championships
Bronze medal – third place	2001 Ghent	Team
Pan American Championships
Gold medal – first place	2001 Cancún	Team
Silver medal – second place	2001 Cancún	All-Around

Mohini Bhardwaj (born September 29, 1978) is an American retired artistic gymnast who competed at the 1997 and 2001 World Championships and earned a silver medal with the American team at the 2004 Summer Olympics in Athens and is a member of the USA Gymnastics Hall of Fame. She is the first Indian-American gymnast, and the second Indian-American athlete in any sport, to medal at the Olympics.

== Early life and career ==
Bhardwaj was born in Philadelphia to parents Indu and Kaushal. She has one younger brother, Arun. Her mother, Indu, is a Russian from New York who converted to Hinduism and teaches yoga; her father is from India and is a physician in Cincinnati. Bhardwaj was raised in the Hindu faith and is vegetarian.

She began taking gymnastics classes at the age of four in her hometown, Cincinnati, where she attended Seven Hills School. At the age of 13, she moved to Orlando to train at Brown's Gymnastics. When she was 16, her coach, Alexander Alexandrov, moved to Houston to open a new facility for Brown's, and Bhardwaj followed without her parents. Living alone in a Texas apartment, her gymnastics suffered.

At the 1996 U.S. Olympic Trials, Bhardwaj finished in 10th place, missing a spot on the team by 0.075. She continued training after the Olympics, but at the 1997 U.S. Nationals, NBC commentators noted that she was only competing at her parents' insistence. Still, she finished third in the all-around at Nationals and earned a spot on the 1997 World Championships team. At Worlds, she was the only American besides Kristen Maloney to qualify for an individual event final, the vault, where she placed fifth.

== NCAA career ==
Bhardwaj's reputation as a wild child scared off some NCAA recruiters, but Valorie Kondos Field, the head coach for the UCLA Bruins gymnastics team, awarded her a full scholarship. Her partying continued through her freshman year, prompting Kondos to issue her an ultimatum to remain on the team.

By 1999, Bhardwaj had changed her ways and became a key member of the Bruins, with increased difficulty on all four events. During her time at UCLA, Bhardwaj earned All-American honors 11 times, earned 23 individual titles, and was the first gymnast from UCLA to be a four-time All-American on the uneven bars. As a senior, she won both the AAI Award and the Honda Sports Award. She was inducted into the UCLA Athletics Hall of Fame in 2013.

=== Career Perfect 10.0 ===
Season	Date	Event	Meet
2001	January 5, 2001	Floor Exercise	Maui Invitational
2001	January 21, 2001	Floor Exercise	UCLA vs. Utah
2001	January 28, 2001	Uneven Bars	UCLA vs. Alabama, CSUF, and Southern Utah
2001	January 28, 2001	Floor Exercise	UCLA vs. Alabama, CSUF, and Southern Utah
2001	March 11, 2001	Uneven Bars	UCLA @ Michigan State
2001	March 18, 2001	Uneven Bars	UCLA vs. Georgia
2001	March 18, 2001	Balance Beam	UCLA vs. Georgia
2001	March 18, 2001	Floor Exercise	UCLA vs. Georgia

== 2001–2004 ==
After ending her UCLA career, Bhardwaj returned to elite competition. At the 2001 National Championships, she won the vault title and placed third in the all-around. She was named to the American team for the 2001 World Championships in Ghent, Belgium, where she contributed to the U.S. squad's bronze medal. Individually, she placed 18th in the all-around and 7th in the vault event final.

In 2002, she suffered a dislocated elbow and retired for a year before deciding to return to training in 2003. Off the national team and running low on funds, she took odd jobs, such as waitressing and delivering pizzas, to pay for her training and personal expenses. By 2004, she was in debt and could not afford to attend the Olympic Trials and other competitions. Baywatch star Pamela Anderson, who learned of Bhardwaj's situation when she purchased a raffle ticket on her behalf, became a personal supporter and gave Bhardwaj $20,000 for her training expenses.

At the 2004 Nationals, Bhardwaj placed a disappointing 12th in the all-around, only securing the final spot in the Olympic Trials when Ashley Postell fell on bars. But she went on to finish sixth at the Trials, earning an invitation to the subsequent closed-door selection camp. There, she impressed national team coordinator Márta Károlyi and the other selectors enough not only to earn a place on the team, but to be named its captain. Her strength and consistency on vault were expected to add balance to a team already formidable on beam and bars, but at the Olympics, she placed 20th on vault and failed to qualify for the event final.

Bhardwaj was the only American to qualify for the floor final at the Olympics, where she finished in sixth place. She finished eighth all-around in qualifying, behind teammates Carly Patterson (1st) and Courtney Kupets (4th), but was not among the 24 gymnasts to advance because of a rule limiting each country to two competitors in the final. Bhardwaj was the only gymnast in the top ten in qualifications who did not make the all-around final. In the team final, however, she was integral to the team's silver-medal effort: In addition to improving her vault from preliminaries and performing a strong floor exercise, she filled in on beam at the last minute when Kupets decided to sit it out because of a leg injury.

For her Olympic achievements, Bhardwaj was named the India Abroad Person of the Year for 2004.

After the Olympics, Bhardwaj joined the other members of the U.S. team on a national exhibition tour. She tried to continue competing into 2005 and was selected for the American Cup in January, but she had insufficient training time and withdrew. She retired from competitive gymnastics in 2005, at the age of 26. She was inducted into the USA Gymnastics Hall of Fame in 2015.

== Eponymous skill ==
Bhardwaj was the first gymnast to perform the full-twisting Pak Salto, and it is named after her in the Code of Points.

Apparatus	Name	Description	Difficulty (Note: Valid for the 2022-2024 Code of Points)	Added to the Code of Points
Uneven bars	Bhardwaj	Pak Salto with 1/1 turn (360°)	E	2004 Olympic Games

== Post-retirement ==
Bhardwaj Owned OOA Gymnastics in Bend, Oregon, where she coached and ran/owned the business. She has also worked with Olympic hopeful gymnasts at Dan Alch Camp of Champions in Anchorage, Alaska. She became interested in CrossFit in 2016, enjoying the weightlifting aspect of training, and began competing in weightlifting in 2018.

She is formerly married to Jeff Barry, they have one son, Tristen. She divorced him and married Shane de Freitas.

== Major competition results ==
2004 Olympic Games: 2nd team; 6th FX
2004 US Olympic Trials: 6th AA
2004 US Championships: 12th AA; 2nd VT
2001 Honda Sports Award
2001 World Championships: 3rd team; 18th AA; 7th VT
2001 Pan American Championships: 1st Team; 2nd AA; 5th VT
2001 US Championships: 3rd AA; 1st VT; 2nd UB; 6th VT; 7th FX (tie)
2001 NCAA Championships: 1st Team; 1st FX
2000 NCAA Championships: 1st Team; 2nd AA; 1st UB; 2nd BB; 5th VT
1999 NCAA Championships: 11th AA; 6th UB
1999 World University Games: AA (qualified)
1998 NCAA Championships: 4th UB; 7th VT
1997 World Championships: 6th Team; 5th VT
1997 US Championships: 3rd AA; 3rd VT (tie); 5th FX
1997 American Cup: 10th AA (preliminary competition)
1996 US Olympic Trials: 10th AA
1996 US Championships: 12th AA (tie); 2nd BB; 4th VT; 4th UB; 5th FX (tie)
1996 Pacific Alliance Championships: 1st team; 1st AA; 1st VT; 2nd BB; 3rd FX
1996 Moscow World Stars: 4th AA; 2nd UB; 3rd BB; 3rd VT
1995 US Championships: 15th AA; 4th UB (tie); 6th BB
1995 Atlanta Invitational (Olympics Test Event): 8th AA; 1st VT
1995 China Cup: 7th AA; 2nd mixed pairs; 3rd BB: 5th UB (tie); 7th VT
1995 International Mixed Pairs: 5th
1995 US Olympic Festival: 5th AA; 2nd VT; 2nd UB
1994 Puerto Rico International Gymnastics Cup: 2nd VT; 3rd BB 1994 US Championships: 35th AA
1994 US Olympic Festival: 7th AA (tie); 5th BB; 6th VT
1993 US Championships: 10th AA
