= Ariana Berlin =

American artistic gymnast, dancer and film actor

- Born: Ariana Alyse Berlin; October 29, 1987 (age 38); San Diego, California, U.S.
- Education: UCLA Bruins gymnastics team (2005-09)
- Occupations: College gymnast, dancer
- Known for: Gymnastics

Ariana Alyse Berlin Rotstein (born October 29, 1987) is an American artistic gymnast, dancer, and senior producer at Fox Sports who competed for the University of California Los Angeles (UCLA) Bruins gymnastics team from 2006 to 2009.

== Early life ==
Berlin was born in San Diego, California to Howard and Susan Berlin. From early childhood, Berlin trained at Southern California Elite Gymnastics Academy in Temecula and at South Coast Gymnastics in Orange County. Berlin was the Level 9 All-around champion and uneven bars runner-up at the 1999 Western National Championships. In 2001 Berlin suffered multiple long bone fractures and collapse of both lungs as a result of a life-threatening car accident. She graduated in 2005 from Patrick Henry High School.

== Car accident recovery and dance ==
Having difficulty resuming rigorous gymnastics training, Berlin joined the San Diego breakdance troupe Culture Shock and performed at SeaWorld San Diego. At SeaWorld, Berlin met the UCLA Bruins gymnastics head coach, Valorie Kondos Field, who was choreographing the SeaWorld Summer Nights production. Kondos Field encouraged Berlin to resume gymnastics training and welcomed Berlin to tryout for a UCLA Bruins gymnastic walk-on spot.

== UCLA Bruins gymnastics career ==
Berlin matriculated at UCLA in 2005. For the 2005–06 season, she was a walk-on to the UCLA Bruins gymnastics team, but was offered a full scholarship for the 2006–07 season. Berlin was a four-time All-American and one of the most consistent athletes and most successful gymnasts in UCLA history. At UCLA, Berlin majored in World Arts and Cultures with a Dance concentration graduating in 2009.

== Film work ==
Berlin was a stunt performer for one episode of Three Rivers in 2009. In 2010, she was a stunt performer in episodes of NCIS: Los Angeles, Shake It Up!, 90210 and Make It or Break It. Berlin was a stunt double in Switched at Birth, The Fosters, Greek and Honey 2. Berlin's story was adapted into a TV movie, Full Out: The Ariana Berlin Movie, featuring actors Jennifer Beals, Ana Golja, Trevor Tordjman and Lamar Johnson. Berlin played an assistant UCLA coach in the movie Full Out, and was the stunt performer for Ana Golja who played Berlin.
