= Ana Golja =

Canadian actress and singer

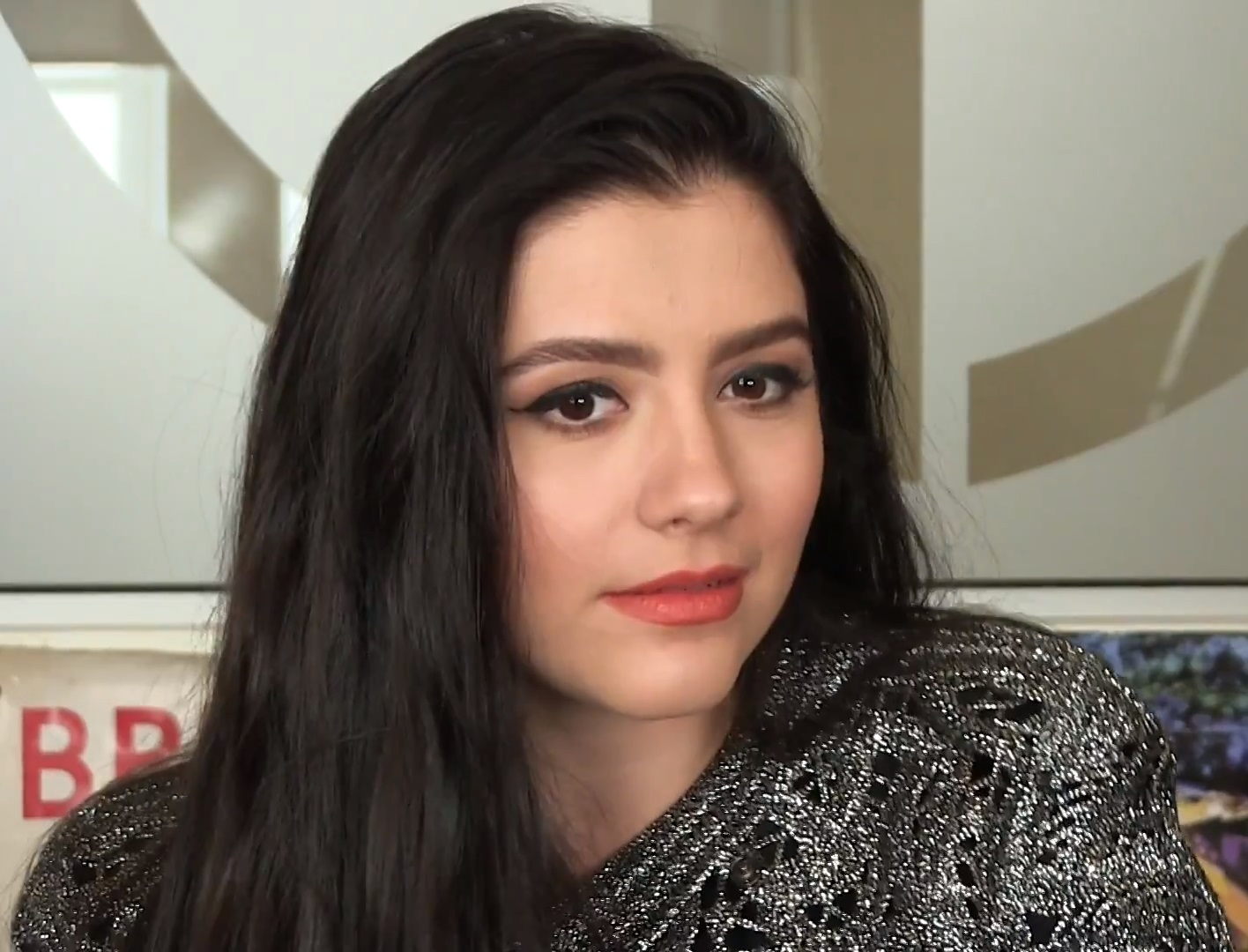
- Golja at an interview for Yangaroo in 2018
- Born: Muazana Golja; January 31, 1996 (age 30); Toronto, Ontario, Canada
- Occupations: Actress, singer-songwriter
- Years active: 2005–present

Muazana "Ana" Golja is a Canadian actress and singer. She is best known for playing Zoë Rivas in the teen dramas Degrassi: Next Class and Degrassi: The Next Generation and Ariana Berlin in the TV movie Full Out.

== Career ==
Golja began her acting career in 2005 as Lucy in the Canadian police series 1-800-Missing. She later had small roles in the series Flashpoint and How to Be Indie, before landing a part in the regular cast of Connor Undercover in 2010.

In 2010 with What's Up Warthogs!, she had her first major role as part of the main cast of that sitcom. In 2011, she played Liz in Clue. She then participated in small projects and a web series before landing the role of Zoë Rivas in the Canadian teen drama Degrassi: Next Class in 2013.

In 2015, Golja played Ariana Berlin, in the TV movie Full Out: The Ariana Berlin Movie, a role which earned her a nomination for the Canadian Screen Awards.

Golja recorded the song "Feel So Good" for the Full Out soundtrack, produced by Roy "Royalty" Hamilton. As of January 2016, Golja was working on her debut EP. She released the EP, titled Epilogue over the course of several weeks in November and December 2017.

Golja co-hosted the Albanian festival Festivali i Këngës 57, the annual Albanian selection for the Eurovision Song Contest, from December 20 to 22, 2018.

== Personal life ==
Golja was born and raised in Toronto to parents from Albania. She later moved to the Streetsville neighborhood in Mississauga, Ontario. She is of Albanian descent, and also has "some Spanish, some Greek, some German, and Jewish" heritage. Golja has stated that she considers herself Canadian "through and through".

== Filmography ==
=== Film ===
| Year | Title | Role | Notes |
|---|---|---|---|
| 2014 | En Vogue Christmas | Amber | |
| 2015 | Full Out: The Ariana Berlin Movie | Ariana Berlin | |
| 2015 | Dumb Luck | Taylor | Short film |
| 2017 | Love On Ice | Nikki Lee | |
| 2018 | Crazy for the Boys | London | |
| 2019 | The Cuban | Mina | Also producer |
| 2019 | The Fanatic | Leah | |
| 2022 | Social Industrial Meltdown | Superstar | Short film |
| 2025 | Off the Grid | Katrina | |
| 2025 | Stolen Girl | Nora | |

=== Television ===
| Year | Title | Role | Notes |
|---|---|---|---|
| 2005 | 1-800-Missing | Lucy | |
| 2008 | Flashpoint | Penny (10 years old) | |
| 2009 | Franny's Feet | Panda | |
| 2010 | What's Up Warthogs! | Laney Nielsen | |
| 2010 | Connor Undercover | Lily Bogdakovitch | |
| 2010 | The Dating Guy | Little Girl Contestants | |
| 2010 | Vacation with Derek | Isabella | Television film |
| 2011 | How to Be Indie | Dotty | |
| 2011 | Little Mosque on the Prairie | Betty Sue | |
| 2011 | Clue | Liz | Miniseries |
| 2012 | Super Why! | Additional Voices / Girl | |
| 2013–2015 | Degrassi: The Next Generation | Zoë Rivas | Main role (seasons 13–14); 55 episodes |
| 2013 | Life with Boys | Cassandra | |
| 2013 | Unlikely Heroes | Ellen | |
| 2014 | Katie Chats | Herself | |
| 2015 | It Goes There: Degrassi's Most Talked About Moments | Herself | |
| 2015 | Degrassi: Don't Look Back | Zoë Rivas | Television film |
| 2016 | Conviction | Jazmin Peligro | |
| 2016–2017 | Degrassi: Next Class | Zoë Rivas | Main role (seasons 1–4); 32 episodes |
| 2018 | Festivali i Këngës 57 | Herself | Co-host |
| 2018 | A Father's Nightmare | Sasha | Television film |
| 2020 | I Do, or Die – A Killer Arrangement | Sonya | Television film |

== Discography ==
- 2015 : Full Out: The Ariana Berlin Movie (Soundtrack)
- 2018 : Epilogue (Debut Album)
- 2019: Bailemos feat. Alx Veliz (Single)
- 2021 : Strive (EP)

== Awards and nominations ==
| Year | Award | Category | Nominated work | Result | Refs |
|---|---|---|---|---|---|
| 2015 | Canadian Screen Award for Best Performance in a Children's or Youth Program or Series | Gemini Award | Full Out: The Ariana Berlin Movie | Nominated | |
