= Danusia Francis =

British-born artistic gymnast (born 1994)

- Full name: Danusia May Francis
- Nickname: Nush
- Born: 13 May 1994 (age 32) Kenilworth, Warwickshire, United Kingdom
- Height: 1.62 m (5 ft 4 in)
- Spouse: Elliott Reid (m. 2022)

Gymnastics career
- Discipline: Women's artistic gymnastics
- Country represented: Jamaica
- Former countries represented: (United Kingdom) Great Britain
- College team: UCLA Bruins (2013–2016)
- Club: Heathrow Gymnastics Club
- Head coach: Vincent Walduck
- Former coach: Valorie Kondos Field
- Choreographer: Natalia Ilienko-Jarois
- Retired: 29 May 2022
Medal record
Representing UCLA Bruins
NCAA Championships
Gold medal – first place	2016 Fort Worth	Balance Beam

Danusia May Francis-Reid (born 13 May 1994) is a retired British artistic gymnast who represented Great Britain and Jamaica in international competition. She was a reserve athlete for Great Britain's 2012 Olympic team. She attended UCLA and competed for the UCLA Bruins gymnastics team. She represented Jamaica at the 2020 Olympic Games.

== Gymnastics career ==
=== 2009 ===
In July, Francis competed at the British Championships in Guildford, United Kingdom. She placed second in the all around final with a score of 53.650. In event finals, she placed first on uneven bars scoring 13.650, joint first on balance beam scoring 13.600, and first on floor scoring 13.700.

=== 2010 ===
In July, Francis competed at the British Championships in Guildford, United Kingdom. She placed third in the all around with a score of 55.350. Francis said, "I'm extremely happy. I've had a bit of a difficult run in with a few injuries so to be able to compete here in the first place was great, and gave me a chance to see where I stand compared to some of the other gymnasts. Having missed out on the Europeans, it was good to show the home crowd what I can do and win a medal."

=== 2011 ===
In February, Francis competed at the English Championships in Stoke-on-Trent, United Kingdom. She placed third in the all around competition with a score of 52.650.

In April, Francis competed at the 2011 European Artistic Gymnastics Championships in Berlin, Germany. In qualifications, she placed twelfth all around with a score of 54.400 which meant that she would move on to the final. She said, "I started off really nervous as we were up on beam first but once Jenni went clear that helped me to relax a bit. The other pieces went well although I maybe played it a bit too safe on bars. The atmosphere was great and we could hear the British fans cheering for us, especially Beth and Hannah when we were on bars." In the all around final, Francis placed sixteenth with a score of 53.375. Afterwards she said, "I'm mostly happy to have gone clean the whole week in my first major event as a senior. I have learnt a huge amount being here, particularly what it may be like to perform in front of a home crowd as the German fans went crazy for their gymnasts. I now have some understanding of what it may be like if I make it to London next year."

In May, Francis participated in the British Teams competition in Guildford, United Kingdom. Her club, Heathrow, finished third and she placed third in the all around with a score of 52.900.

In July, Francis competed at the British Championships in Liverpool, United Kingdom. She placed second in the all around with a score of 53.150. Francis said, "I was slightly annoyed more than anything when I fell on beam but I tried to shake it all off and get back from there so I'm really pleased. I've got a new floor routine which has quite a lot in it so I found it quite hard stamina wise but was happy to finish with the music!"

In October, Francis competed at the 2011 World Artistic Gymnastics Championships in Tokyo, Japan. She contributed a vault score of 13.566 and a balance beam score of 14.141 towards the British team's fifth-place finish.

=== 2012 ===
In March, Francis competed at the English Championships in Kent, United Kingdom. She placed second in the all around competition with a score of 54.650.

In May, Francis competed at the 2012 European Women's Artistic Gymnastics Championships in Brussels, Belgium. She contributed a beam score of 14.000 towards the British team's fourth-place finish.

At the end of May, Francis participated in the British Teams competition which acted as the first Olympic trial. Her club, Heathrow, placed fourth and she placed second in the all around with a score of 55.100.

At the beginning of June, Francis competed at an international friendly with gymnasts from Finland and Spain in Ipswich, United Kingdom which was also the second Olympic trial. She placed sixth in the all around competition with a score of 54.050 and third in the uneven bars final with a score of 13.850.

At the end of June, Francis competed at the British Championships in Liverpool, United Kingdom. This is the third and final Olympic Trial to decide the gymnasts that will represent the United Kingdom at the Olympics. She placed sixth in the all around competition with a score of 53.700. In event finals, she placed eighth on uneven bars scoring 11.350 and fourth on balance beam scoring 13.800.

=== 2015 ===
In October, Francis returned to the elite gymnastics scene as a member of Jamaica's women's team at the 2015 World Championships. As a result of her performance, Francis was able to receive Jamaica a qualification spot to the 2016 Olympic Test Event.

=== 2016 ===
Senior Danusia Francis was awarded regular season All-American honors by the National Association of College Gymnastics Coaches (NACGC/W). She was also named to the 2016 Pac-12 All-Conference teams. On April 15, 2016, Francis was a co-champion of the balance beam competition at the 2016 NCAA Women's Gymnastics Championship.

=== 2019 ===
In October, Francis competed together with two other members of Jamaica's women's team at the 2019 World Championships. As a result of her performance in qualifications, Francis was able to receive an individual qualification spot to the 2020 Olympic Games in Tokyo.

“She finished 47th in the all-around [...] attaining a score of 50.982. Her Olympic qualification came as she finished among the top 20 athletes who were not on a qualifying team. She ranked ninth in the group of competitors. Francis participated in all four events in the qualifying round and achieved a score of 13.5 in the vault event, 12.35 in the uneven bars event, and 12.566 in both the balance beam and the floor exercise events“.

=== 2021 ===
At the 2020 Summer Olympics in Tokyo Francis was due to take part in the women's individual all-around event. Two days prior to the competition Francis learned she had torn her anterior cruciate ligament. She therefore withdrew from the balance beam, the vault and the floor exercise. She chose to continue to compete in the uneven bars with her knee bandaged, scoring the lowest of any competitor as the judges deducted 6.5 points for various infractions and gave her only a 0.5 difficulty score. However, her 9.033 execution score was the highest for any athlete on uneven bars.

== See also ==
- Nationality changes in gymnastics
