= Full Out =

- Directed by: Sean Cisterna
- Starring: Jennifer Beals; Ana Golja; Art Hindle; Jake Epstein; Ramona Milano; Trevor Tordjman; Lamar Johnson
- Music by: Grayson Matthews, Roy "Royalty" Hamilton
- Country of origin: Canada
- Original language: English

Production
- Producers: Jay Deverett; Jeff Deverett
- Cinematography: Pasha Patriki
- Editor: Michelle Szemberg
- Running time: 90 minutes
- Production company: Carmel Creek Productions

Original release
- Release: September 11, 2015

Full Out, also known as Full Out: The Ariana Berlin Movie, is a 2015 drama young-adult TV movie directed by Sean Cisterna based on the life story of American gymnast Ariana Berlin.

Ana Golja received a 2016 Canadian Screen Awards nomination for Best Performance in a Children's or Youth Program or Series.

== Plot ==
Ariana Berlin is a promising gymnast and excels at bars. She catches the eyes of college scouts and Coach Valorie Kondos Field from UCLA. After a meet she is driving home with her mom when they meet with a car accident resulting in many fractures, a concussion, and Ariana's femur snaps and is replaced by a metal rod. She is devastated that she can't train or compete in the Olympics.

Meanwhile her best friend Isla who has always been shadowed by Ariana and is under the constant watch of her Olympic-medal father, wins the silver medal at the Olympics and is admitted to UCLA under a gymnastics scholarship. Ariana meets Michelle, a physician at the PT section as she tries to regain her walking. Ariana goes to her local gym to see her old friends but instead watches an intimate moment between her boyfriend and Isla, and begins ignoring her. While recovering, Michelle takes Ariana to a dance party and Ariana meets Michelle's breakdancing dance troupe. While observing, she sees that they have the incorrect posture and will likely get hurt attempting stunts in their dance garage. Ariana also catches the eye of Adam, a dancer on the troupe. Michelle asks Ariana to coach her troupe but she isn't ready to get back into gymnastics yet. She completes her recovery. One day she locks up the gym and starts doing the bars and beam for fun. Her old coach watches her and says she should practice a little and try out for the UCLA team in a walk-in try-outs. Ariana also accepts Michelle's offer and allows the troupe to use the gym at night, teaching them acrobatics and gymnastics. She also begins dancing.

Finally, she decides to try out for the UCLA team, still being coached by Coach Kondos Field or "Miss Val." She makes the cut however she and Isla still don't speak. Finally, she reconciles with Isla but gives up dancing to focus on gymnastics. Her troupe leaves angry but they make up soon and they teach the girls on Ariana's dance team some moves. Ariana also struggles to complete the final piece to her routine - the full out.

On the day of the dance troupe's competition, Michelle has to back out because of her asthma and Ariana ditches practice to dance with them. They win and get a deal to tour around the world as performers. At Ariana's competition, she completes the routine completely and overcomes the small fear she had of constricting herself, and she had to go all full out. The movie ends with all the main characters dancing on the floor.

== Cast ==
- Ana Golja as Ariana Berlin, a promising gymnast whose future is shattered by a car accident
- Sarah Fisher as Isla, Ariana's best friend, and an Olympic silver-medalist
- Asha Bromfield as Michelle, Ariana's physical therapy nurse who is part of a dance troupe that Ariana coaches
- Robbie Graham-Kuntz as Adam, Ariana's love interest and a member of the dance troupe
- Jennifer Beals as Coach Valerie Kondos Field, Ariana's gymnastics coach at UCLA
- Lamar Johnson as Twist, an acrobat on the dance troupe
- Jacqueline Byers as Caity
- Trevor Tordjman as Nate, Ariana's former boyfriend

== Additional crew ==
- Robyn Deverett as the physiotherapy consultant.

== Sequels ==
Full Out has a sequel, Full Out 2: You Got This!, which was released on Netflix in 2020. The sequel is based on the story of the 2016 Oklahoma Sooners gymnastics team.
