= Sharon Shapiro =

American gymnast

Gymnastics career
- Country represented: United States; (1976-78 and 1979-81)
- College team: UCLA Bruins women's gymnastics team

Sharon Shapiro is an American former gymnast. She won five gold medals at the 1977 Maccabiah Games. In 1978, she was the U.S. National Champion in the vault. She was a two-time National Collegiate All-Around Champion. In 1981, she won the Honda-Broderick Award as the nation's most outstanding collegiate women's gymnast.

== Early life ==
Shapiro's hometowns were Arleta and Sepulveda, California. She is Jewish. She attended Monroe High School, graduating in 1979.

== Gymnastics career ==
Shapiro was a United States women's national gymnastics team member from 1976 to 1978 and 1979–81. She won five gold medals at the 1977 Maccabiah Games in individual and team gymnastics, when she was 15 years of age. In 1978, she was won the U.S. National Championship in the vault at the U.S. Gymnastics Federation Women's Championships in Uniondale, New York. That year she also became the first U.S. woman gymnast to score as 39.05 points out of a possible 40, which she did at an invitational meet in Fresno, California.

Shapiro competed in gymnastics for the UCLA Bruins. She won UCLA's first individual national title in women's gymnastics and made history at 17 years of age as a true freshman at the 1980 Association for Intercollegiate Athletics for Women (AIAW) Championships, when she became the first collegiate woman to sweep all four individual events (vault, uneven bars, balance beam, floor exercise) as well as the all-around.

At the 1981 AIAW Championships as a sophomore, Shapiro again won first-place individual national honors in the all-around and on vault, and was an All-American on the uneven bars. She also became the first Bruin gymnast to win the Honda-Broderick Award as the nation's most outstanding collegiate women's gymnast. Shapiro led the Bruins to first place in the Western Collegiate Athletic Association (WCAA) and at the AIAW Regionals, and a second-place team finish at the AIAW National Championships.

As a junior in 1982, Shapiro was an All-American in the all-around, vault, and balance beam.

Shapiro was an eight-time national title holder, and a 12-time All-American.

She performed the flips as a body double for actress Jennifer Beals in the 1983 romantic drama movie Flashdance.

== Honors ==
In 1990, Shapiro was inducted into the Southern California Jewish Sports Hall of Fame. In 1999, Shapiro became the first Bruin women's gymnast inducted into the UCLA Athletics Hall of Fame. In 2013, she was inducted into the California Interscholastic Federation (CIF) Los Angeles City Section Sports Hall of Fame. In 2016, she was named to the Pac-12 Women's Gymnastics All-Century Team.
