= Alyssa Beckerman =

American gymnast (born 1981)

- Full name: Alyssa Erin Beckerman
- Born: January 23, 1981 (age 45) Long Branch, New Jersey, U.S.
- Height: 5 ft 3 in (160 cm)

Gymnastics career
- Discipline: Women's artistic gymnastics
- Country represented: United States (3 (1997–2001))
- College team: University of California, Los Angeles
- Club: Cincinnati Gymnastics Academy
- Former coaches: Mary Lee Tracy; Valorie Kondos Field
- Retired: September 11, 2003
Medal record
Women's artistic gymnastics
Representing the United States
Pan American Games
Silver medal – second place	1999 Winnipeg	Team
Representing UCLA Bruins
NCAA Championships
Gold medal – first place	2001 Athens	Team
Gold medal – first place	2003 Lincoln	Team
Bronze medal – third place	2002 Tuscaloosa	Team

Alyssa Erin Beckerman (born January 23, 1981) is an American former gymnast and balance beam national champion. She was a member of the United States national team from 1997 to 2000, and competed on the University of California, Los Angeles intercollegiate gymnastics team from 2001 to 2003. She was an alternate for the 2000 Sydney Olympic Games.

== Gymnastics career ==
=== Pre-elite ===
Beckerman began training in gymnastics in 1986, when she was five years old.

=== Elite career ===
In 1996, Beckerman placed twenty-fifth in the all-around junior division at the Coca-Cola National Championships. In 1997, Beckerman became a senior competitor and a member of the United States national team. She competed at the 1997 US Classic and placed ninth in the all-around. She also competed at the 1997 John Hancock US Gymnastics Championships, placing twentieth in the all-around.

In 1998, Beckerman moved from New Jersey to Ohio to train with coach Mary Lee Tracy at Cincinnati Gymnastics Academy. Tracy trained Beckerman for up to ten hours per day, and kept Beckerman on a restrictive diet of under 1100 calories per day. According to Beckerman, Tracy "controlled every element, in and out of the gym" creating a competitive culture of anxiety and silence.

Beckerman was a silver medalist on bars at the 1998 US National Championships and placed second in the all-around at the 1998 Ecoair Gymnastics Cup. Beckerman was third on bars and fourth in the all-around at the 1999 US National Championships. She was third in the all around at the 1999 American Classic and a team silver medalist at the 1999 Pan American Games. She took third in the all-around at the 1999 World Championships trials and was named to the 1999 US World Championships team but was unable to compete due to a broken wrist. Beckerman won the all-around and team competition at the 2000 Spieth Sogipa. She was first on balance beam, second on bars and fifth in the all-around at the 2000 US National Championships. She was named an alternate member of the 2000 US Olympic team, but did not compete because fellow alternate Tasha Schwikert was selected instead to replace injured team member Morgan White.

By the end of Beckerman's elite career, she had suffered nine broken bones, undergone two surgeries, and developed bleeding ulcers from overuse of anti-inflammatory drugs. During her career, she also suffered from disordered eating. During her elite career, her favorite event was uneven bars.

=== Intercollegiate career ===
Beckerman competed on the University of California, Los Angeles (UCLA) intercollegiate gymnastics team from 2001 to 2003 while pursuing a degree in sociology. In 2001, Beckerman was limited to three competitions due to a wrist injury. She placed second and recorded a score of 9.875 on balance beam at Arizona State, as well as placing fifth on balance beam with a score of 9.8 at the UCLA Invitational. She earned NACGC Scholastic All-America honors that year. During the 2002 season, Beckerman was UCLA's anchor on balance beam, averaging 9.77 over the year and winning individually six times. She was NCAA South Central Regional balance beam champion and Pac-10 balance beam champion, as well as earning a Pac-10 All-Academic honorable mention. On September 11, 2003, at the beginning of her senior year, Beckerman was dismissed from the UCLA team by coach Valorie Kondos Field. Kondos Field claimed that the dismissal was due to Beckerman's performance in training and unenthusiastic attitude, although Beckerman disputed those allegations. Beckerman was stripped of her athletic scholarship and housing, but completed her degree. In 2020, following widespread public discussion on social media under the hashtag "#gymnastalliance" of allegations by gymnasts of an abusive gymnastics culture that rewarded coaches who damaged and belittled gymnasts, Beckerman posted an open letter to Ms Kondos Field on social media where she related her experiences of competing at UCLA.

=== Post-gymnastics career ===
As of 2018, Beckerman owns a music school and works as an emergency medical technician in New Jersey. In a 2018 interview after the USA gymnastics abuse scandal became public, Beckerman expressed that she was "leaning toward" favoring the dissolution of USA Gymnastics because "the structure needs to be changed completely so obedience isn't the desired outcome." She said:

"When [a coach] has so much control, it puts a young person in a mindset that the coach has more authority than anyone else in their life - that they should put all their faith in them...There's a fine line between...where the culture is healthy, to a culture of silence...[In elite gymnastics, gymnasts] were not allowed to speak...That does a lot to you, psychologically. You try to be as meek and as serious as possible. 'Stoic' was this huge compliment at [national training] camp. We all strived [sic] for that. Being someone who never complained was a compliment. So, you don't speak out, because it's ingrained in you that if you do, you have poor integrity, that you're a bad gymnast, a bad teammate. Asking questions [in elite gymnastics] is very taboo."

== Personal life ==
Beckerman was born in Long Branch, New Jersey to Howard and Melanie Beckerman. She has two brothers and is the middle sibling. Beckerman grew up in Middletown Township, New Jersey, where she attended Middletown High School South. In 2014, she married Matthew King.
