= 2010 NCAA women's gymnastics championships =

American college gymnastics competition

2010 NCAA Women's Gymnastics Championships
- Venue: O'Connell Center
- Location: Gainesville, Florida
- Dates: April 15–17

Medalists
gold medal	UCLA
silver medal	Oklahoma
bronze medal	Alabama

The 2010 NCAA Women's Gymnastics Championship was held in Gainesville, Florida on April 22–24, 2010. UCLA Bruins won the 2010 team competition, earning their sixth national championship. LSU's Susan Jackson scored 39.625 points to capture the individual title.

NCAA Women's Gymnastics Regional Fields:

- Los Angeles Regional (at UCLA): UCLA (First), Arkansas (Second), Iowa State, Arizona, BYU, Arizona State, Saturday, April 10 6 pm (PT)
- Salt Lake City Regional (at Utah): Florida (First), Utah (Second), Auburn, Boise State, Denver, Washington
- Columbia Regional (at Missouri): Missouri (First), Oregon State (Second), Georgia (Second), Minnesota, Iowa, North Carolina (Note: Oregon State won tiebreaker)
- Lexington Regional (at Kentucky): Alabama (First), Nebraska (Second), Illinois, Kentucky, Central Michigan, Michigan State
- University Park Regional (at Penn State): Oklahoma (First), LSU (Second), Penn State, Maryland, Ohio State, New Hampshire
- Morgantown Regional (at West Virginia): Stanford (First), Michigan (Second), Southern Utah, North Carolina State, Kent State, West Virginia

NCAA Women's Gymnastics Championship:

- NCAA Championships, Gainesville, FL, April 22, Afternoon Session (1 p.m. ET): UCLA (No.1 seed), Oklahoma (No. 4), Utah (No. 5), Oregon State (No. 8), LSU (No. 9), Nebraska (No. 12); Evening Session (7 p.m. ET): Florida (No. 2), Alabama (No. 3), Stanford (No. 6), Arkansas (No. 7), Missouri (No. 10), Michigan (No. 11)
- NCAA Championship (Super Six Finals), Gainesville, FL, April 23 ( 6 p.m. ET): UCLA, Utah, Oklahoma, Alabama, Florida, Stanford
- Individual Event Finals – Gainesville, FL, Saturday, April 24 (6 p.m.)

== Champions ==
Event	Gold	Silver	Bronze
Team	UCLA Bruins; Kaelie Baer; Marci Bernholtz; Monique De La Torre; Tauny Frattone; Aisha Gerber; Danielle Greig; Elyse Hopfner-Hibbs; Tiffany Hyland; Talia Kushynski; Anna Li; Brittani McCullough; Alyssa Pritchett; Mizuki Sato; Courtney Shannon; Chloe Takayanagi; Allison Taylor; Niki Tom; Lichelle Wong; Vanessa Zamarripa; Ariana Berlin	Oklahoma Sooners; Candace Cindell; Megan Ferguson; Jacki Flanery; Natasha Kalley; Julie Kramer; Mary Mantle; Bethany Neubauer; Kayla Nowak; Brie Olson; Nitya Ramaswami; Natalie Ratcliff; Melanie Root; Kristin Smith; Sara Stone; Hollie Vise	Alabama Crimson Tide; Becca Alexin; Courtney Bell; Alyssa Chapman; Morgan Dennis; Jocelyn Fowler; Marissa Gutierrez; Mary Hauswirth; Kayla Hoffman; Ricki Lebegern; Megan Mashburn; Casey Overton; Erika Pearson; Kassi Price; Ashley Priess; Ashley Sledge; Geralen Stack-Eaton; Rachel Terry
All-Around	Susan Jackson (LSU)	Casey Jo Magee (Arkansas)	Carly Janiga (Stanford)
Vault	Vanessa Zamarripa (UCLA)	Susan Jackson (LSU)	Mandi Rodriguez (Oregon State)
Uneven Bars	Carly Janiga (Stanford)	Summer Hubbard (LSU), Hollie Vise (Oklahoma)	Susan Jackson (LSU)
Balance Beam	Susan Jackson (LSU)	Carly Janiga (Stanford), Courtney McCool (Georgia)	Casey Jo Magee (Arkansas)
Floor Exercise	Brittani McCullough (UCLA)	Hollie Vise (Oklahoma), Sarah Shire (Missouri), Brandi Personett (Penn State)	Marissa King (Florida), Morgan Dennis (Alabama)

== Team Results ==
=== Session 1 ===
Position	Team	Vault (gymnastics)	Uneven bars	Balance beam	Floor (gymnastics)	Total
1	UCLA Bruins	49.400	49.125	48.975	49.375	196.875
2	Utah Red Rocks	49.125	49.150	49.250	49.100	196.625
3	Oklahoma Sooners	49.00	49.150	49.150	49.250	196.550
4	Nebraska Cornhuskers	49.375	49.150	48.525	49.125	196.175
5	Oregon State Beavers	48.950	48.975	48.975	49.150	196.050
6	LSU Tigers	49.100	49.300	48.625	49.000	196.025

=== Session 2 ===
Position	Team	Vault (gymnastics)	Uneven bars	Balance beam	Floor (gymnastics)	Total
1	Alabama Crimson Tide	49.325	49.350	49.225	48.950	196.850
2	Florida Gators	49.425	48.900	49.175	49.275	196.775
3	Stanford Cardinal	49.325	48.950	49.100	48.925	196.300
4	Michigan Wolverines	49.375	48.725	48.450	49.150	195.700
5	Arkansas Razorbacks	49.250	49.025	48.000	48.925	195.600
6	Missouri Tigers	48.200	49.025	47.450	48.925	194.600

=== Super Six ===
Position	Team	Vault (gymnastics)	Uneven bars	Balance beam	Floor (gymnastics)	Total
1	UCLA Bruins	49.475	49.325	49.375	49.550	197.725
2	Oklahoma Sooners	49.300	49.325	49.200	49.425	197.250
3	Alabama Crimson Tide	49.375	49.425	49.325	49.100	197.225
4	Stanford Cardinal	49.400	49.275	49.100	48.325	197.100
5	Florida Gators	49.250	49.125	49.200	49.425	197.000
6	Utah Red Rocks	49.275	49.300	48.425	49.225	196.225
