= Lacy Dagen =

American artistic gymnast

- Full name: Lacy Michele Dagen
- Born: May 17, 1997 (age 29) Concord, California

Gymnastics career
- Discipline: Women's artistic gymnastics
- College team: Florida Gators (2016–17); Oregon State Beavers (2018–21)
- Club: San Mateo
- Head coach: Tanya Chaplin
- Former coaches: Jenny Rowland, Armen Astoian
- Music: Whatever Lola Wants (2012)

Lacy Dagen
Current position
- Title: Assistant coach
- Team: UCLA
- Conference: Big Ten

Biographical details
- Education: Oregon State University

Coaching career (HC unless noted)
- 2021–2022: U.C. Davis (Volunteer Asst.)
- 2022–2023: Oregon State (Volunteer Asst.)
- 2023–2024: Arizona State (Asst.)
- 2024–present: UCLA (Asst.)

Lacy Michele Dagen (born May 17, 1997, in Concord, California) is an American collegiate gymnastics coach and former artistic gymnast. She competed for the Florida Gators and for the Oregon State Beavers.

== Early life ==
On May 17, 1997, Dagen was born as Lacy Michele Dagen in Concord, California. Dagen's father is Shawn Dagen, the president of FreshSource North and her mother is Paige Dagen, an English teacher at Foothill High School. She has one younger sister, Madison (b. December 27, 1999), who is also a gymnast.

In 2001, Dagen began gymnastics classes at Cal West Gymnastics, after continuously doing cartwheels. The club changed owners and became Bay Aerials Gymnastics, where Dagen trained and competed until 2006 when she moved to Pacific West Gymnastics. In 2008, she became the Level 8 Regional champion. A year later, in 2009, Dagen placed tenth in the all-around at the 2009 Westerns. Lacy remained a level nine gymnast for the 2010 season; winning the Western Championship.

== Gymnastics career ==
=== 2011—12: Level 10 career ===
In 2011, Lacy moved up to Level 10 for the 2011 season. She participated in a few invitationals but had to retire for the season, due to injury. Following the 2011 season, she moved to San Mateo Gymnastics. A year later, in 2012, Dagen competed as a level ten again. She was third at States and seventeenth at Regionals.

=== 2012—13: Elite career ===
In February 2012, Dagen participated at the WOGA Elite Qualifier; qualifying elite status. In May, Lacy was tenth in the all-around at the American Classic at the Karolyi Ranch. At the 2012 U.S. Classic, Dagen was fourteenth in the all-around. Later, in St Louis, Missouri, she competed at U.S. Nationals where she placed sixteenth in the all-around.

On January 7, 2013, it was announced that she had committed to the Florida Gators gymnastics program. In 2013, Dagen advanced to Senior International Elite status, due to her turning sixteen. In July, she was fifth at the American Classic. She was scheduled to participate in the 2013 Secret U.S. Classic but didn't attend due to injury.

=== 2014—15: Level 10 career ===
After deciding to transition from Elite to Level 10, Dagen was State and Regional Champion. At J.O. Nationals, she was third in the all-around and was the beam champion. On November 13, 2014, she signed the National Letter of Intent to the Florida Gators. Dagen competed at three invitationals throughout the 2015 season but was nursing a minor injury throughout the Championship season.
