= Valorie Kondos Field =

American gymnastics coach

Biographical details
- Born: August 20, 1959 (age 67); Sacramento, California, U.S.
- Education: University of California, Los Angeles

Coaching career (HC unless noted)
- 1983–1990: UCLA (Asst.)
- 1991–2019: UCLA

Accomplishments and honors

Championships
- NCAA national championship (1997, 2000, 2001, 2003, 2004, 2010, 2018); Pac-12 championship (1993, 1995, 1997, 1999, 2000, 2002, 2003, 2005, 2007, 2009, 2010, 2012, 2016, 2018, 2019)

Awards
- NACGC/W National Coach of the Year (1996, 1997, 2000, 2001); Pac-12 Coach of the Year (1995, 2000, 2003, 2012) Pac-12 Coach of the Century; UCLA Athletics Hall Of Fame Inductee (2010); West Region Co-Coach of the Year (1993, 1994); West Region Head Coach of the Year (1995, 2018, 2019); 2017 Women of Inspiration Award recipient by the Los Angeles Chapter of Women in Sports and Events 2019 Hellenic Athletic Hall of Fame

Valorie Kondos Field (born Valorie Kondos; August 20, 1959), often referred to as Miss Val, is a retired American gymnastics coach. She was the head coach of the UCLA Bruins gymnastics team of the University of California, Los Angeles (UCLA) from 1991 to 2019, leading the Bruins to seven national championship titles. She is a four-time Conference Coach of the Year, the 2018 West Region Head Coach of the Year, and the Pac-12 Gymnastics Coach of the Century. She is the third most-winning NCAA gymnastics coach, behind Suzanne Yoculan and Greg Marsden.

== Early life ==
Kondos Field grew up in Sacramento, California. Kondos Field was a professional ballet dancer at Sacramento Ballet, Capital City Ballet, and Washington Ballet. In 1982, at age twenty-two, she retired from dancing to attend the University of California, Los Angeles. In 1983, she became an assistant coach and choreographer for the UCLA Bruins gymnastics team. She graduated from UCLA in 1987 with a degree in history. Kondos Field is also an accomplished pianist, and director and producer of live shows.

== Coaching career ==
Kondos Field was named head coach of the UCLA Bruins gymnastics team in 1991. In 1997, the team won their first national NCAA championship title, she was the fourth coach in NCAA Gymnastics history to win a championship. The team won the National Championship title again in 2000, 2001, 2003, 2004, 2010 and 2018, for a total of seven wins under Kondos Field's leadership. Additionally, the team won 19 Pac-12 championships, the first in 1993 and the last in 2019. and 16 NCAA Regional titles. In 2010, Kondos Field was inducted into the UCLA Athletics Hall of Fame.

Over the years Kondos Field has coached Olympic gymnasts: Jamie Dantzscher, Mohini Bhardwaj, Kate Richardson, Tasha Schwikert, Kristen Maloney, Yvonne Tousek, Stella Umeh, Luisa Portocarrero, Elyse Hopfner-Hibbs, Sam Peszek, Jennifer Pinches, Peng Peng Lee, Kyla Ross, and Madison Kocian. Peng Peng Lee was elected team captain for the Canadian Olympic team in 2012. In her final season at UCLA, Lee helped the team win their seventh NCAA title with a perfect 10 (her second of the day) on the last routine of the meet. Jordyn Wieber joined the team as the team manager and then a volunteer assistant coach for UCLA.

In 2004, Former National Team Member and UCLA gymnast Jeanette Antolin was named the Sports Illustrated On Campus National Gymnast of the Year. She also helped lead the Bruins to 3 National Championships. This comeback came after Antolin was removed from the team in 2001. Antolin was reinstated in 2002 stating, “I am more responsible for my actions. I used to put things off on other people. Now I know it starts with me.”

In August 2018, Kondos Field joined Olympic Gold Medalists and UCLA gymnasts Kyla Ross and Madison Kocian as they publicly spoke about abuse by Larry Nassar publicly for the first time.

Kondos Field coached 20 athletes to 36 NCAA Individual Championships as head and assistant coach. She coached 5 Honda Award Winners and two Pac-12 Scholar Athlete of the Year. Kondos Field was voted NCAA Coach of the Year four times by her peers and in 2016 was voted the Coach of the Century by the PAC12 Conference. On September 20, 2018, she announced her retirement as the head coach of the Bruins gymnastics team, with her final meet on April 20, 2019.

== Choreography ==
In 2004 Kondos Field earned Choreographer of the Year award at the Canadian National Championships for Kate Richardson’s beam and floor routines. Kondos Field worked as a freelance choreographer and director with the entertainment department at SeaWorld, San Diego for 30 years. Riptide and Cirque De La Mer won the IAAPA, which is an international award for theme park shows. Kondos Field was the co-executive producer for the 2017 TV special “Jump, Jive & Thrive,” a televised benefit show for the Breast Cancer Research Foundation.

== Publications ==
Kondos Field's autobiography Life is Short, Don't Wait to Dance was published by Hachette Book Group in October 2018. It contains self-help and leadership advice based on Kondos Field's experiences as a gymnastics coach.

== Speaking ==
Kondos Field has spoken at “Corporate Coaching” events for companies including Gucci, JPMorgan Chase, General Electric, Jackson National Life Insurance, and the Aspen Institute, and has contributed to panel discussions including Bustle’s “Rule Breakers” and the ESPNW Summit.

Her first TED Talk, "Why winning doesn't always equal success” was delivered in 2019 and has garnered over 2 million views.

Kondos Field joined softball coach Sue Enquist to teach a webinar series called “Critical Conversations: Transformative Coaching and Leadership,” presented by the UCLA Transformative Coaching & Leadership Academy.

== Personal life ==
Kondos Field is married to retired UCLA Senior Associate Athletic Director and former football coach, Bobby Field, a three-year starter for the Arkansas Razorbacks football team from 1968-70.

In May 2014, Kondos Field was diagnosed with an aggressive form of breast cancer. She continued to coach between chemo sessions. Cancer free today, Kondos Field works closely with the BCRF (Breast Cancer Research Foundation) to spread awareness, raise money for research and impact others by sharing her personal journey. She refers to her diagnosis as one of the best things that has ever happened to her and credits faith for getting her through. “Be anxious for nothing and grateful for all things” is the commandment that changed her life. She talks about a mental shift to gratitude during treatment. Kondos Field changed her inner dialogue from, "I have to go to chemotherapy" to "I get to go to chemotherapy.”

She opened up about this on a February 2016 edition of UCLA Bruins gymnastics' YouTube online web series Bruin Banter, hosted by Danusia Francis.

Kondos Field is Greek-American and Eastern Orthodox.

== Controversies ==
Kondos Field dismissed Alyssa Beckerman from the UCLA gymnastics team in 2003. Kondos Field claimed this was due to Beckerman's "subpar training and lack of enthusiasm," which Beckerman disputed. Although Beckerman had been injured, she was a two-time national champion as a member of the Bruins.

On August 21, 2020, Beckerman tweeted an “Open letter to Mrs. Valorie Kondos Field.” In the letter, Beckerman reflects on her tenure as a UCLA gymnast and details her experiences with Kondos Field as her coach: “I was lucky that I had a small circle of teammates on the fringe that understood, and said out loud, what we went through was abuse.” Her statement further read:

[B]ack when I was first finding my voice, speaking out about abusive coaching... the code of silencing athletes to protect fellow coaches and USAG was still the rule of the day. From my perspective, the goal of [Kondos Field’s] methods were to shut me up and shut me down… But I’m still here Miss Val, and you can’t erase me. Teaming up again with Mary Lee won’t work anymore either. It only tells me you are still a bully, using provocation as a form of control.

In response two days later, Kondos Field tweeted her regret and shared that she had apologized to Beckerman privately two years prior. She stated: "I wish all of my athletes could’ve been led by the coach I was the last 10 years of my career," while noting that a formal arbitration instigated by Beckerman and her father supported the rescission of Beckerman's scholarship.

In 2019, in the aftermath of the college admissions bribery scandal, the Los Angeles Times revealed that a member of the Bruins gymnastics team had no previous competitive record. She was admitted to UCLA as a scholar-athlete despite this, raising concerns that she had used personal connections to pave her way. In a book published in 2018, Kondos Field described the student’s uncle as ‘one of my dearest friends.’ UCLA officials claimed that said student-athlete was admitted based on her athletic potential.

== In popular culture ==
Kondos Field was portrayed by Jennifer Beals in the 2015 film Full Out about former UCLA Bruin gymnast Ariana Berlin and her comeback after a life-threatening car accident. Impressed by Berlin’s work ethic and respect, Kondos Field let Berlin walk onto the UCLA gymnastics team not knowing if she would be able to do gymnastics and not expecting her to ever compete. Berlin would go on to become a 4-time All American for UCLA gymnastics.

In February 2016, UCLA gymnast Sophina DeJesus performed on The Ellen DeGeneres Show after her Kondos Field choreographed hip-hop inspired floor routine went viral.

In 2019, Katelyn Ohashi grabbed the world’s attention with her Perfect 10 floor routine. Ohashi’s viral performance garnered over 137 million views, won the Best Viral Moment ESPY and the ESPY for Best Play. The video was shared by the likes of Kamala Harris and Janet Jackson. Ohashi became a media sensation and credited Kondos Field for helping her heal and find joy in the sport again. On January 17, 2019, the two appeared on Good Morning America with Robin Roberts.

More than a hundred alumni came to Pauley Pavilion for Kondos Field’s final home meet, celebrating with a surprise flash mob and dance party. Samantha Peszek, JaNay Honest, and the Pac 12 Network crew won a LA Emmy award for their Live Sports Coverage coverage of the "2019 Farewell Miss Val meet.”
