= UCLA Bruins women's gymnastics =

College women's gymnastics team representing the University of California, Los Angeles

- Founded: 1974
- University: University of California, Los Angeles
- Head coach: Janelle McDonald (4th season)
- Conference: Big Ten
- Location: Los Angeles, California
- Home arena: Pauley Pavilion (Capacity: 13,800)
- Nickname: Bruins
- Colors: Blue and gold

National championships
- 7 (1997, 2000, 2001, 2003, 2004, 2010, 2018); NCAA Championships

Four on the Floor appearances
- 2 (2019, 2025)

Super Six appearances
- 22 (1993, 1994, 1995, 1996, 1997, 1998, 1999, 2000, 2001, 2002, 2003, 2004, 2005, 2007, 2010, 2011, 2012, 2013, 2014, 2016, 2017, 2018)

NCAA Regional championships
- 24 (1982, 1987, 1989, 1990, 1993, 1994, 1995, 1996, 1997, 1999, 2000, 2001, 2002, 2003, 2004, 2005, 2007, 2010, 2011, 2012, 2015, 2017, 2019, 2026)

Conference championships
- 23 (1981 [WCAA], 1987, 1988, 1989, 1990, 1993, 1996, 1997, 1999, 2000, 2002, 2003, 2005, 2007, 2009, 2010, 2012, 2016, 2018, 2019, 2023, 2025, 2026; Pac-12 Championships (1981-2023) & Big Ten Championships (2025-)

The UCLA Bruins women's gymnastics team represents the University of California, Los Angeles and competes in the Big Ten Conference. They compete in Pauley Pavilion in Los Angeles, California. The team, coached by Janelle McDonald, has won 21 Regional titles and seven NCAA National Championships, most recently in 2018.

The Bruins are known for recruiting top elite gymnasts from North America and beyond, including Austria, Germany, Guatemala, and Ireland. Some notable former and current UCLA gymnasts include U.S. Assistant Secretary of State for Public Affairs Michelle Giuda, psychologist Onnie Willis Rogers, stuntwoman Heidi Moneymaker, and Olympic gymnasts Jamie Dantzscher, Mohini Bhardwaj, Kate Richardson, Tasha Schwikert, Kristen Maloney, Yvonne Tousek, Stella Umeh, Luisa Portocarrero, Elyse Hopfner-Hibbs, Sam Peszek, Peng Peng Lee, Jennifer Pinches, Jordyn Wieber (former Bruins team manager and volunteer assistant coach), Kyla Ross, Madison Kocian, Brooklyn Moors, Jordan Chiles, and Emma Malabuyo.

The 2025 season saw the team compete in the Big Ten Conference for the first time since the university switched from the Pac-12 conference. The shift moves the team from frequent competition with national-level teams such as California and Utah to a conference whose teams have won just one national championship in four decades.

== Highlights ==
- 1997, 2000, 2001, 2003, 2004: Won national championship.
- 2008 Canadian Olympic Gymnastics team member Elyse Hopfner-Hibbs attended UCLA, a member of the team in 2008–2009 season.
- 2009: The Bruins won the 2009 Pac-10 title, their 14th, and was 7th seeded in the NCAA National Championships. They competed at the NCAA North Central Regionals at Carver-Hawkeye Arena on Saturday, Apr. 4 with Florida (#6), Minnesota (#18), Denver (#20), Iowa State (#23) and Iowa (#28). The Bruins came in second behind Florida. In the second session of the national championships, the Bruins finished tie for third place with Utah. But Utah won the tie breakers by counting all the scores of the six competitors in each event and advanced to the Super Six team finals.

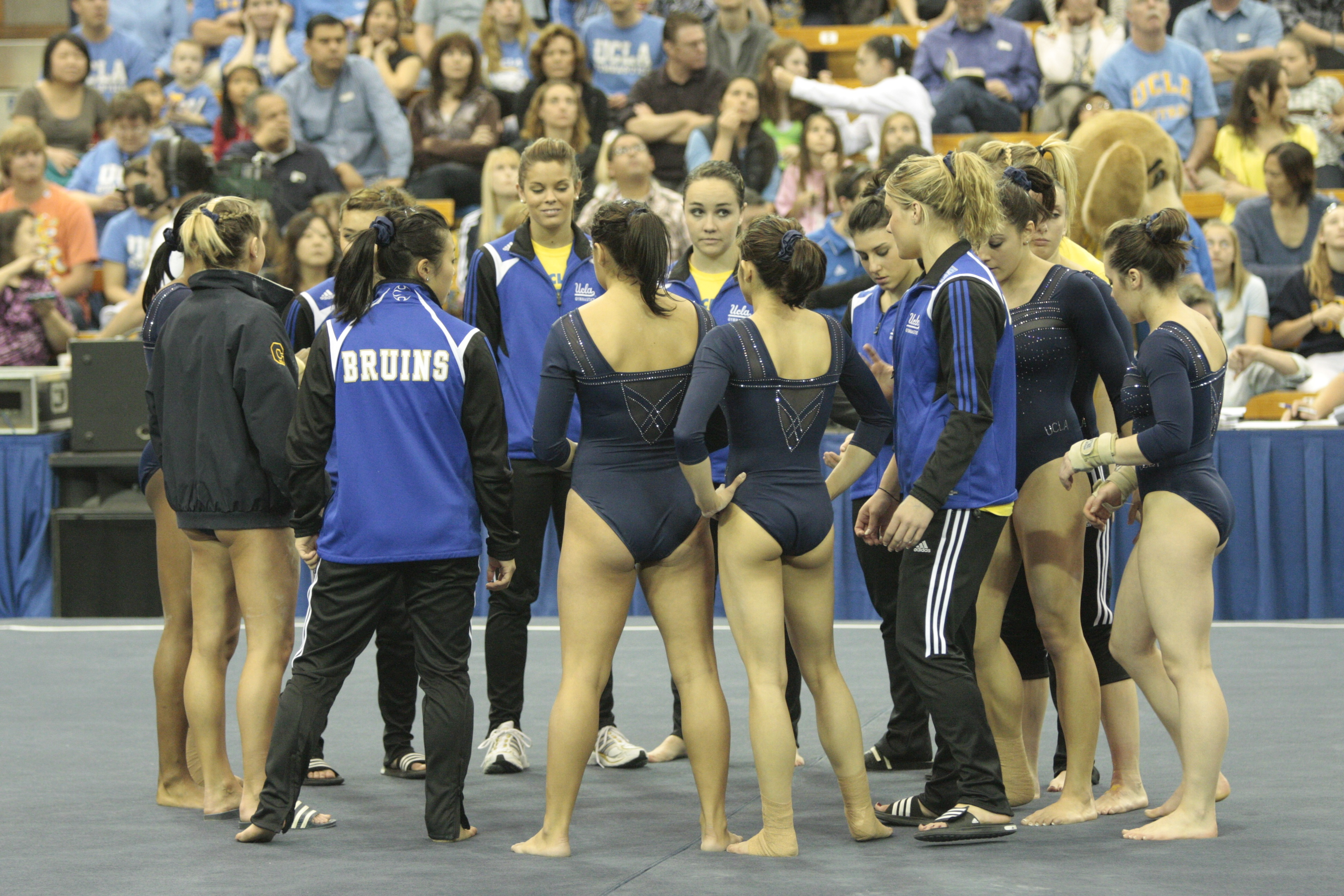
The UCLA Bruins women's gymnastics team in 2010

- 2010: The team won its 15th Pacific-10 Championship, with Anna Li scoring a perfect 10 on uneven bars. Vanessa Zamarripa won all-around and vault, and was named 2010 Pac-10 Gymnast Of The Year.
- 2010: UCLA Gymnastics won the Los Angeles Regional and qualified for the NCAA Championships in Gainesville, Florida. Anna Li again scored a perfect 10 on the uneven bars at Pauley Pavilion, where both of her parents, Li Yuejiu and Wu Jiani won medals at the 1984 Olympic Games.
- 2010: USA Olympic team silver medalist Samantha Peszek is attending UCLA, and is a new member of the 2011 UCLA gymnastics team.
- 2010: The team won its sixth NCAA title at the O'Connell Center in Gainesville, FL.
- 2011: UCLA finished second in the national competition; Athens Regional champions; Samantha Peszek was first in balance beam with a 9.90 score.
- 2012: Third-place finish in team competition; Olivia Courtney was third in uneven bars, and Elyse Hopfner-Hibbs was second in floor exercise.
- 2013: UCLA was 4th in the team competition held at its own Pauley Pavilion; Four Bruins finished as top-eight performers in individual competition, three (Olivia Courtney, Kaelie Baer, and Vanessa Zamarripa) on vault and one (Danusia Francis) on beam.
- 2014: UCLA did not qualify to Saturday night's Super Six competition in Birmingham, AL. Two Bruins competed on Sunday in event finals, Samantha Peszek and Olivia Courtney.
- 2015: UCLA captured the team's 21st Regional Championship with a score of 197.500 points at the NCAA Columbus Regional. Samantha Peszek was the All Around Co-Champion with 39.6 points; Samantha Peszek also won the balance beam with a 9.950 score.
- 2016: UCLA finished second at the Salt Lake City Regional, held at the University of Utah's Jon M. Huntsman Center with a score of 196.375. The Bruins advanced to the NCAA Gymnastics Championships for the 32nd time, assigned to the Semifinal II. Seniors Danusia Francis and Sadiqua Bynum and junior Angi Cipra were awarded regular season All-America honors by the National Association of College Gymnastics Coaches (NACGC/W).
- 2017: UCLA finished 4th at the NCAA Super Six Finals. Freshman Kyla Ross won both the balance beam and the uneven bars titles; she also received four perfect 10.0 scores throughout the season. Freshman Madison Kocian also scored a perfect 10.0 on February 11.
- 2018: UCLA won their seventh NCAA title in St Louis. Peng Peng Lee and Katelyn Ohashi also won individual titles on the balance beam and floor exercise, respectively.
- 2019: Coach Valorie Kondos Field will retire from coaching. An attendance record of 12,907 at Pauley Pavilion was set during a meet with Stanford on March 10, 2019. Senior Katelyn Ohashi set a Pac-12 record by winning the conference's Specialist of the Week award for the sixth time and her 10th career award this season. Kyla Ross completed a "gym slam" on March 17, 2019, at Miss Val's final home meet in Pauley Pavilion by recording a perfect 10 score on the floor exercise. UCLA won the Pac-12 championship with a score of 198.4, setting a new Pac-12 Gymnastics Championship record. Kyla Ross was the Pac-12 Gymnast of the Year, and Valorie Kondos Field was the Coach of the Year (her fifth Pac-12 honor).
- 2020: On January 31, senior Gracie Kramer became the first of two gymnasts to score a perfect 10 on the floor exercise during the season; her routine garnered millions of views online. On February 23, senior Grace Glenn scored the first leadoff 10.0 on the balance beam in NCAA history; junior Nia Dennis' floor routine from the same meet went viral on Twitter and Facebook, leading to her appearance on the Ellen Show on March 11. Kyla Ross scored three 10.0 scores during the season, two on bars and the other on the last vault of her career; this brought her career total to 22 perfect scores, tied 4th with Maggie Nichols in NCAA history. On March 12, the NCAA cancelled the remainder of the season due to the COVID-19 pandemic in the United States The team finished the season ranked third, with an RQS of 197.565 after the tenth week of competition.
- 2023: Received a share of the Pac-12 regular season title, along with Utah, Oregon State, and Cal.
- 2024: Selena Harris was named the Pac-12 Gymnast of the Year, after winning the All-Around at the Pac-12 Championships and scoring four 10.0s during the season. She also earned the bronze medal on the balance beam at the NCAA Championships.
- 2025: In its first season in the Big Ten Conference, UCLA won its first-ever Big Ten regular season title and conference championship title. UCLA Gymnastics became the first UCLA team ever to win both the regular season and conference championship titles in the Big Ten.
- 2026: UCLA became the first team to win its second consecutive Big Ten regular season and conference championship titles..

== Championships ==
=== Super Six appearances ===
UCLA Bruins Super Six Appearances
Year	Finish	Score
1993	4th	194.925
1994	5th	194.975
1995	3rd	196.150
1996	2nd	197.475
1997	1st	197.150
1998	5th	195.750
1999	5th	195.850
2000	1st	197.300
2001	1st	197.575
2002	3rd	197.150
2003	1st	197.825
2004	1st	198.125
2005	4th	197.150
2007	4th	196.925
2010	1st	197.725
2011	2nd	197.375
2012	3rd	197.750
2013	4th	197.100
2014	6th	197.050
2016	5th	196.8250
2017	4th	197.2625
2018	1st	198.075

=== Four on the Floor appearances ===
UCLA Bruins Four on the Floor Appearances
Year	Finish	Score
2019	3rd	197.5375
2025	2nd	197.6125

== Coaches ==
=== Head coaches ===
Name	Years	Record	Win %
Lee Ann Lobdill	1977–1979	34–30–0	.531
Jerry Tomlinson	1980–1990	191–63–1	.750
Scott Bull	1991–1994	77–16–0	.828
Valorie Kondos Field	1991–2019	516–120–3	.810
Chris Waller	2020–2022	20–10–0	.667
Janelle McDonald	2023–present		

- record includes invitationals and conference championships as of 2021.

=== Coaches for the current season ===
Coaches for the current season
Name	Position
Janelle McDonald	Head Coach
BJ Das	Associate Head Coach
Lacy Dagen	Assistant Coach
Mark Freeman	Assistant Coach
Jordan Chiles	Student Coach

== Current roster ==
2026–2027 Roster
Name	Height	Year	Hometown	Club
Alilah Alvarado	5-3	SR	Rancho Cucamonga, CA	SCEGA
Sydney Barros	5-3	SR	Lewisville, TX	Texas Dreams Gymnastics
Ava Callahan	5-6	SO	Cary, NC	Team Attraction Gymnastics
Jordis Eichman	5-2	SO	Colorado Springs, CO	World Champions Centre
Sasha Fujisaka	5-0	JR	San Jose, CA	Airborne Gymnastics
Bronwyn Hoffman	5-6	JR	Los Angeles, CA	AOGC
Riley Jenkins	5-4	JR	Burbank, CA	The Klub Gymnastics
Brooke Katz	5-7	FR	Las Vegas, NV	Flip for Me
Kai Mattei	5-3	SO	New York, NY	North Stars
Nola Matthews	5-3	SO	Gilroy, CA	Airbourne Gymnastics
Macy McGowan	5-2	JR	Las Vegas, NV	Juanita
Zoey Molomo	5-6	FR	Frisco, TX	Metroplex Gymnastics
Michelle Pineda	5-2	FR	Allen, TX	Metroplex Gymnastics
Katelyn Rosen	5-2	SR	Boerne, TX	Twin City Twisters
Jolyn Sicat Valeros	5-3	FR	Chino Hills, CA	Gymnastics Olympica
Taz Stewart	5-1	FR	Chicago, IL	Legacy Elite Gymnastics
Ashlee Sullivan	5-0	SO	Richardson, TX	Metroplex
Tiana Sumanasekera	5-1	SO	Pleasanton, CA	World Champions Centre
Cami Tassone	5-3	FR	Chicago, IL	IK Gymnastics
Mika Webster-Longin	4-11	JR	Richmond, CA	East Bay Gymnastics

== NCAA Championships ==
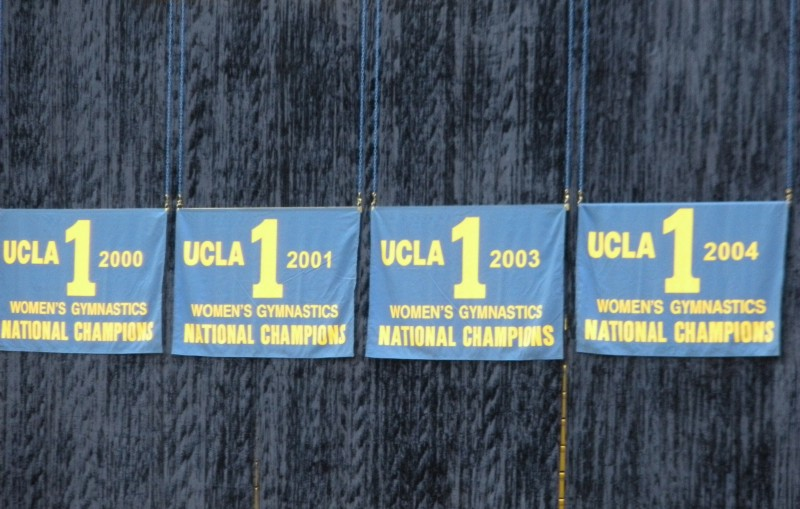
Banners noting UCLA's NCAA national championships.

UCLA has won 45 NCAA individual titles and seven team titles:

Event	Winner/Year
Team (7)	UCLA 1997, 2000, 2001, 2003, 2004, 2010, 2018
All Around (5)	Onnie Willis 2001; Jamie Dantzscher 2002; Tasha Schwikert 2005, 2008; Sam Peszek 2015
Vault (7)	Jill Andrews 1988; Kim Hamilton 1989; Heidi Moneymaker 1999; Jamie Dantzscher 2002; Kristen Maloney 2005; Vanessa Zamarripa 2010; Kyla Ross 2019
Uneven Bars (9)	Heidi Moneymaker 1998; Mohini Bhardwaj 2000; Yvonne Tousek 2001; Jamie Dantzscher 2003; Kate Richardson 2003; Tasha Schwikert 2008; Kyla Ross 2017; Jordan Chiles 2023, 2025
Balance Beam (10)	Jill Andrews 1989; Kiralee Hayashi 1999; Lena Degteva 2000; Kate Richardson 2003; Kristen Maloney 2005; Sam Peszek 2011, 2015; Danusia Francis 2016; Kyla Ross 2017; Peng Peng Lee 2018
Floor Exercise (14)	Kim Hamilton 1987, 1988, 1989; Stella Umeh 1995, 1998; Mohini Bhardwaj 2001; Jamie Dantzscher 2002; Kate Richardson 2006; Brittani McCullough 2010; Katelyn Ohashi 2018; Kyla Ross 2019; Jordan Chiles 2023, 2026; Brooklyn Moors 2025

== Awards and honors ==
Honda Award Winners

- Kyla Ross, 2020
- Christine Peng-Peng Lee, 2018
- Kristen Maloney, 2005
- Onnie Willis, 2003
- Mohini Bhardwaj, 2001
- Jill Andrews, 1990
- Sharon Shapiro, 1981

AAI Award (National Senior of the Year)

- Jordan Chiles, 2026
- Vanessa Zamarripa, 2013
- Jamie Dantzscher, 2004
- Mohini Bhardwaj, 2001
- Donna Kemp, 1984

Conference Gymnast of the Year

Big Ten

- Jordan Chiles, 2026

Pac-12

- Selena Harris, 2024
- Kyla Ross, 2019 & 2020
- Vanessa Zamarripa, 2010 & 2013
- Tasha Schwikert, 2007
- Kate Richardson, 2006
- Kristen Maloney, 2005
- Jeanette Antolin, 2004
- Onnie Willis, 2003
- Jamie Dantzscher, 2002
- Mohini Bhardwaj, 2001
- Heidi Moneymaker, 2000
- Kiralee Hayashi, 1999
- Stella Umeh, 1998
- Leah Homma, 1995 & 1997
- Jill Andrews, 1988 & 1990
- Tanya Service, 1987 & 1989

Pac-12 Freshman/Newcomer of the Year

- Selena Harris, 2023
- Chae Campbell, 2021
- Kyla Ross, 2017
- Olivia Courtney, 2011
- Elyse Hopfner-Hibbs, 2009
- Brittani McCullough, 2008
- Ariana Berlin, 2006
- Tasha Schwikert, 2005
- Kate Richardson, 2003
- Doni Thompson, 2000

Pac-12 Specialist of the Year

- Katelyn Ohashi, 2018 & 2019
- Christine Peng-Peng Lee, 2017

Pac-12 Scholar-Athletes of the Year

- Pauline Tratz, 2021
- Madison Kocian, 2020
- Christine Peng-Peng Lee, 2018

National Coach of the Year

- Valorie Kondos Field, 2001, 2000, 1997, 1996, 1989
- Jerry Tomlinson, 1989

National Asst. Coach of the Year

- Chris Waller, 2004
- Randy Lane, 2000

== UCLA Gymnastics at the Olympics ==
UCLA has been represented at every Olympic Games since 1984, except 1988. UCLA gymnasts have medaled in each Games since 2000.

=== Olympians ===
Year	Country	Name	Medal(s)
1984	Canada	Gigi Zosa	
1992	Guatemala	Luisa Portocarrero	
1992	Canada	Stella Umeh	
1996	Canada	Yvonne Tousek	
2000	Canada	Yvonne Tousek	
2000	Canada	Michelle Conway	
2000	Canada	Kate Richardson	
2000	United States	Jamie Dantzscher	team
2000	United States	Kristen Maloney	team
2000	United States	Tasha Schwikert	team
2004	Canada	Kate Richardson	
2004	United States	Mohini Bhardwaj	team
2008	Canada	Elyse Hopfner-Hibbs	
2008	United States	Samantha Peszek	team
2012	Great Britain	Jennifer Pinches	
2012	United States	Kyla Ross	team
2016	United States	Madison Kocian	team uneven bars
2020	Canada	Brooklyn Moors	
2020	Jamaica	Danusia Francis	
2020	United States	Jordan Chiles	team
2024	Philippines	Emma Malabuyo	
2024	United States	Jordan Chiles	team

=== Alternates and others ===
Year	Country	Name	Role
1988	United States	Rhonda Faehn	Alternate
2000	Great Britain	Holly Murdock	Alternate
2000	United States	Alyssa Beckerman	Alternate
2004	Canada	Marci Bernholtz	Alternate
2004	United States	Tasha Schwikert	Alternate
2012	Canada	Peng-Peng Lee	Honorary captain
2012	Great Britain	Danusia Francis	Alternate
2012	United States	Anna Li	Alternate
2016	Germany	Pauline Tratz	Alternate
2020	United States	Emma Malabuyo	Alternate
2024	United States	Tiana Sumanasekera	Non-traveling Alternate

== Men's gymnastics team ==
The Bruins men's gymnastics team won two NCAA national champions in 1984 and 1987, but was eliminated as part of university budget cuts in 1995.

Notable alumni of UCLA men's gymnastics include:

- Glenn Berry, 1928 Olympian and USA Gymnastics Hall of Fame inductee
- Tim Daggett, 1984 Olympic gold medallist
- Mitch Gaylord, 1984 NCAA all-around champion & Olympic gold medallist
- Brian Ginsberg, two-time US junior national gymnastics champion
- Scott Keswick, 1992 US Olympian and world rings and high bar finalist
- Stephen McCain, 2000 US Olympian and 2001 world silver medallist
- Chainey Umphrey, 1996 US Olympian and world high bar finalist
- Peter Vidmar, 1982, 1983 NCAA all-around champion & 1984 2x Olympic gold medallist
- Chris Waller, 1990 NCAA high bar champion and previous women's team head coach (2020-2022)

== See also ==
- UCLA Bruins
- NCAA Women's Gymnastics Championships
- Former and current UCLA gymnasts
