= List of former United States women's national gymnastics team rosters =

This is a list of female artistic gymnasts who have been on the United States national team.

The national team includes two age divisions. Only gymnasts 16 and older are eligible for the senior national team, from which Olympic and World Championship rosters are chosen. The junior national team is composed of gymnasts younger than 16. (Before 1997, the age cutoff was 14.)

USA Gymnastics, the governing body for gymnastics in the United States, generally names the teams each summer after the National Championships, but gymnasts are sometimes added to or removed from the rosters based on their performance at training camps throughout the year. Thus, some gymnasts listed under a given year were on the national team for only part of that year.

Gymnasts on the junior national team may be moved to the senior national team midyear upon turning 16. In these cases, the gymnasts are listed in the senior national team section for that year.

== Current roster ==
Senior national team
Name	Residence	Club
Skye Blakely	Frisco, Texas	WOGA
Jade Carey	Phoenix, Arizona	Oregon State
Jordan Chiles	Spring, Texas	World Champions Centre
Kayla DiCello	Boyds, Maryland	Hill's Gymnastics
Shilese Jones	Westerville, Ohio	Ascend Gymnastics
Konnor McClain	Cross Lanes, West Virginia	WOGA
Elle Mueller	Ham Lake, Minnesota	Twin City Twisters
Lexi Zeiss	Omaha, Nebraska	Twin City Twisters

Junior national team
Name	Residence	Club
Dulcy Caylor	Spring, Texas	World Champions Centre
Jayla Hang	Bellevue, Washington	Pacific Reign
Madray Johnson	Dallas, Texas	WOGA
Zoey Molomo	McKinney, Texas	Metroplex
Hezly Rivera	Plano, Texas	WOGA
Audrey Snyder	Annapolis, Maryland	First State
Izzy Stassi	Delaware, Ohio	Gym X-Treme
Tiana Sumanasekera	Pleasanton, California	West Valley Gymnastics School
Alicia Zhou	San Antonio, Texas	Love Gymnastics

== 2020s ==
=== 2021–22 ===
Senior national team
Name	Residence	Club
Simone Biles	Spring, Texas	World Champions Centre
Skye Blakely	Frisco, Texas	WOGA
Charlotte Booth	Clermont, Florida	Brandy Johnson's Global Gymnastics
Jade Carey	Phoenix, Arizona	Arizona Sunrays
Jordan Chiles	Spring, Texas	World Champions Centre
Kailin Chio	Henderson, Nevada	Gymcats Gymnastics
Kayla DiCello	Boyds, Maryland	Hill's Gymnastics
Amari Drayton	Spring, Texas	World Champions Centre
Kara Eaker	Grain Valley, Missouri	GAGE
Addison Fatta	Wrightsville, Pennsylvania	Prestige Gymnastics
Shilese Jones	Westerville, Ohio	Future Gymnastics Academy
Katelyn Jong	Allen, Texas	Metroplex Gymnastics
Emily Lee	Los Gatos, California	West Valley Gymnastics
Sunisa Lee	Saint Paul, Minnesota	Midwest Gymnastics
Kaliya Lincoln	Frisco, Texas	WOGA
Emma Malabuyo	Flower Mound, Texas	Texas Dreams Gymnastics
Grace McCallum	Isanti, Minnesota	Twin City Twisters
Riley McCusker	Brielle, New Jersey	Arizona Sunrays
Zoe Miller	Spring, Texas	World Champions Centre
Joscelyn Roberson	Texarkana, Texas	North East Texas Elite
Ava Siegfeldt	Williamsburg, Virginia	World Class Gymnastics
MyKayla Skinner	Gilbert, Arizona	Desert Lights Gymnastics
Leanne Wong	Overland Park, Kansas	GAGE

Junior national team
Name	Residence	Club
Madray Johnson	Dallas, Texas	WOGA
Avery King	Dallas, Texas	WOGA
Myli Lew	Belmont, California	San Mateo Gymnastics
Ella Murphy	Frisco, Texas	WOGA
Ella Kate Parker	West Chester, Ohio	Cincinnati Gymnastics
Hezly Rivera	Plano, Texas	WOGA
Tiana Sumanasekera	Pleasanton, California	West Valley Gymnastics School
Gabriella Van Frayen	Lewis Center, Ohio	Gym X-Treme

=== 2021 ===
Senior national team
Name	Club	Residence
Ciena Alipio	Midwest Gymnastics	San Jose, California
Simone Biles	World Champions Centre	Spring, Texas
Skye Blakely	WOGA	Frisco, Texas
Jade Carey	Arizona Sunrays	Phoenix, Arizona
Jordan Chiles	World Champions Centre	Spring, Texas
Kayla DiCello	Hill's Gymnastics	Boyds, Maryland
Amari Drayton	World Champions Centre	Spring, Texas
Kara Eaker	GAGE	Grain Valley, Missouri
Aleah Finnegan	GAGE	Lee's Summit, Missouri
Olivia Greaves	World Champions Centre	Staten Island, New York
Morgan Hurd	First State Gymnastics	Middletown, Delaware
Shilese Jones	Future Gymnastics	Westerville, Ohio
Emily Lee	West Valley Gymnastics	Los Gatos, California
Sunisa Lee	Midwest Gymnastics	Saint Paul, Minnesota
Lilly Lippeatt	Cincinnati Gymnastics	Mason, Ohio
Grace McCallum	Twin City Twisters	Isanti, Minnesota
Riley McCusker	Arizona Sunrays	Brielle, New Jersey
MyKayla Skinner	Desert Lights Gymnastics	Gilbert, Arizona
Leanne Wong	GAGE	Overland Park, Kansas

Junior national team
Name	Club	Residence
Charlotte Booth	Brandy Johnson's Global Gymnastics	Clermont, Florida
Madray Johnson	WOGA	Dallas, Texas
Katelyn Jong	Metroplex Gymnastics	Allen, Texas
Levi Jung-Ruivivar	Twin City Twisters	Maple Grove, Minnesota
Kaliya Lincoln	WOGA	Frisco, Texas
Nola Matthews	Airborne Gymnastics	Gilroy, California
Ella Kate Parker	Premier Athletics	Knoxville, Tennessee
Joscelyn Roberson	North East Texas Elite Gymnastics	Texarkana, Texas

=== 2019–21 ===
Senior national team
Name	Club	Residence
Simone Biles	World Champions Centre	Spring, Texas
Sophia Butler	Discover Gymnastics Inc.	Houston, Texas
Jade Carey	Arizona Sunrays	Phoenix, Arizona
Jordan Chiles	World Champions Centre	Spring, Texas
Kayla DiCello	Hill's Gymnastics	Boyds, Maryland
Kara Eaker	Great American Gymnastics Express	Grain Valley, Missouri
Morgan Hurd	First State Gymnastics	Middletown, Delaware
Shilese Jones	Future Gymnastics Academy	Westerville, Ohio
Emily Lee	West Valley Gymnastics School	Los Gatos, California
Sunisa Lee	Midwest Gymnastics Center	Saint Paul, Minnesota
Lilly Lippeatt	Cincinnati Gymnastics Academy	Mason, Ohio
Grace McCallum	Twin City Twisters	Isanti, Minnesota
Riley McCusker	Arizona Sunrays	Brielle, New Jersey
MyKayla Skinner	Desert Lights Gymnastics	Gilbert, Arizona
Faith Torrez	Legacy Elite Gymnastics LLC	Pleasant Prairie, Wisconsin
Leanne Wong	Great American Gymnastics Express	Overland Park, Kansas

Junior national team
Name	Club	Residence
Ciena Alipio	West Valley Gymnastics School	San Jose, California
Sydney Barros	Texas Dreams Gymnastics	Lewisville, Texas
Love Birt	First State Gymnastics	Camden, Delaware
Skye Blakely	World Olympic Gymnastics Academy	Frisco, Texas
Sophia Butler	Discover Gymnastics	Houston, Texas
eMjae Frazier	Parkettes National Gymnastics Center	Erial, New Jersey
Olivia Greaves	MG Elite	Staten Island, New York
Katelyn Jong	Metroplex Gymnastics	Allen, Texas
Kaliya Lincoln	Airborne Gymnastics	Mountain House, California
Konnor McClain	Revolution Gymnastics	Cross Lanes, West Virginia
Anya Pilgrim	Hill's Gymnastics	Germantown, Maryland
Katelyn Rosen	Mavericks Gymnastics	Boerne, Texas

== 2010s ==
=== 2018–19 ===
Senior national team
Name	Club	Residence
Simone Biles	World Champions Centre	Spring, Texas
Sloane Blakely	World Olympic Gymnastics Academy	Frisco, Texas
Jade Carey	Arizona Sunrays	Phoenix, Arizona
Jordan Chiles	Naydenov Gymnastics	Vancouver, Washington
Kara Eaker	Great American Gymnastics Express	Grain Valley, Missouri
Aleah Finnegan	Great American Gymnastics Express	Lee's Summit, Missouri
Morgan Hurd	First State Gymnastics	Middletown, Delaware
Shilese Jones	Future Gymnastics Academy	Westerville, Ohio
Sunisa Lee	Midwest Gymnastics Center	Saint Paul, Minnesota
Emma Malabuyo	Texas Dreams Gymnastics	Flower Mound, Texas
Grace McCallum	Twin City Twisters	Isanti, Minnesota
Riley McCusker	MG Elite	Brielle, New Jersey
Gabby Perea	Legacy Elite Gymnastics	Geneva, Illinois
Ragan Smith	Texas Dreams Gymnastics	Lewisville, Texas
Alyona Shchennikova	5280 Gymnastics	Evergreen, Colorado
Trinity Thomas	Prestige Gymnastics	York, Pennsylvania
Leanne Wong	Great American Gymnastics Express	Overland Park, Kansas

Junior national team
Name	Club	Residence
Ciena Alipio	West Valley Gymnastics School	San Jose, California
Sydney Barros	Texas Dreams Gymnastics	Lewisville, Texas
Skye Blakely	World Olympic Gymnastics Academy	Frisco, Texas
Sophia Butler	Discover Gymnastics	Houston, Texas
Kayla DiCello	Hill's Gymnastics	Boyds, Maryland
Olivia Greaves	MG Elite	Staten Island, New York
Lilly Lippeatt	Cincinnati Gymnastics Academy	Mason, Ohio
Konnor McClain	Revolution Gymnastics	Cross Lanes, West Virginia
Kaylen Morgan	Everest Gymnastics	Huntersville, North Carolina

=== 2017–18 ===
Senior national team
Name	Club	Residence
Simone Biles	World Champions Centre	Spring, Texas
Jade Carey	Oasis Gymnastics	Phoenix, Arizona
Jordan Chiles	Naydenov Gymnastics	Vancouver, Washington
Margzetta Frazier	Parkettes National Gymnastics Center	Erial, New Jersey
Morgan Hurd	First State Gymnastics	Middletown, Delaware
Ashton Locklear	World Champions Centre	Spring, Texas
Grace McCallum	Twin City Twisters	Isanti, Minnesota
Riley McCusker	MG Elite	Brielle, New Jersey
Maile O'Keefe	Salcianu Elite	Las Vegas, Nevada
Ragan Smith	Texas Dreams Gymnastics	Lewisville, Texas
Trinity Thomas	Prestige Gymnastics	York, Pennsylvania

Junior national team
Name	Club	Residence
Sydney Barros	Texas Dreams Gymnastics	Woodstock, Georgia
Jordan Bowers	Solid Rock Gymnastics	Lincoln, Nebraska
Audrey Davis	World Olympic Gymnastics Academy	Frisco, Texas
Kayla DiCello	Hill's Gymnastics	Boyds, Maryland
Kara Eaker	Great American Gymnastics Express	Grain Valley, Missouri
Adeline Kenlin	Iowa Gym-Nest	Coralville, Iowa
Sunisa Lee	Midwest Gymnastics Center	Saint Paul, Minnesota
Emma Malabuyo	Texas Dreams Gymnastics	Flower Mound, Texas
Gabby Perea	Legacy Elite Gymnastics	Geneva, Illinois
JaFree Scott	Great American Gymnastics Express	Independence, Missouri
Tori Tatum	Twin City Twisters	Chanhassen, Minnesota
Leanne Wong	Great American Gymnastics Express	Overland Park, Kansas

=== 2016–17 ===
Senior national team
Name	Club	Residence
Shania Adams	Buckeye Gymnastics	Plain City, Ohio
Alyssa Baumann	World Olympic Gymnastics Academy	Plano, Texas
Simone Biles	World Champions Centre	Spring, Texas
Jordan Chiles	Naydenov Gymnastics	Vancouver, Washington
Christina Desiderio	Parkettes National Gymnastics Center	Hackettstown, New Jersey
Gabby Douglas	Buckeye Gymnastics	Tarzana, California
Brenna Dowell	Great American Gymnastics Express	Odessa, Missouri
Rachel Gowey	Chow's Gymnastics and Dance Institute	Urbandale, Iowa
Laurie Hernandez	MG Elite	Old Bridge, New Jersey
Amelia Hundley	Cincinnati Gymnastics Academy	Hamilton, Ohio
Morgan Hurd	First State Gymnastics	Middletown, Delaware
Madison Kocian	World Olympic Gymnastics Academy	Dallas, Texas
Ashton Locklear	Everest Gymnastics	Hamlet, North Carolina
Riley McCusker	MG Elite	Brielle, New Jersey
Victoria Nguyen	Chow's Gymnastics and Dance Institute	West Des Moines, Iowa
Maggie Nichols	Twin City Twisters	Little Canada, Minnesota
Abby Paulson	Twin City Twisters	Coon Rapids, Minnesota
Aly Raisman	Brestyan's American Gymnastics	Needham, Massachusetts
Emily Schild	Everest Gymnastics	Huntersville, North Carolina
Alyona Shchennikova	5280 Gymnastics	Evergreen Colorado
MyKayla Skinner	Desert Lights Gymnastics	Gilbert, Arizona
Ragan Smith	Texas Dreams Gymnastics	Lewisville, Texas
Trinity Thomas	Prestige Gymnastics	York, Pennsylvania

Junior national team
Name	Club	Residence
Olivia Dunne	ENA Paramus	Hillsdale, New Jersey
Adeline Kenlin	Iowa Gym-Nest	Iowa City, Iowa
Sunisa Lee	Midwest Gymnastics Center	Saint Paul, Minnesota
Emma Malabuyo	Texas Dreams Gymnastics	Flower Mound, Texas
Maile O'Keefe	Salcianu Elite	Las Vegas, Nevada
Gabby Perea	Legacy Elite Gymnastics	Geneva, Illinois

=== 2015–16 ===
Senior national team
Name	Club	Residence
Alyssa Baumann	World Olympic Gymnastics Academy	Plano, Texas
Simone Biles	World Champions Centre	Spring, Texas
Nia Dennis	Legacy Elite Gymnastics	Westerville, Ohio
Gabby Douglas	Buckeye Gymnastics	Tarzana, California
Brenna Dowell	Great American Gymnastics Express	Odessa, Missouri
Emily Gaskins	Palm Beach Gymnastics	Coral Springs, Florida
Amelia Hundley	Cincinnati Gymnastics Academy	Hamilton, Ohio
Sydney Johnson-Scharpf	Brandy Johnson's Global Gymnastics	Groveland, Florida
Bailie Key	Texas Dreams Gymnastics	Montgomery, Texas
Madison Kocian	World Olympic Gymnastics Academy	Dallas, Texas
Ashton Locklear	Everest Gymnastics	Hamlet, North Carolina
Maggie Nichols	Twin City Twisters	Little Canada, Minnesota
Aly Raisman	Brestyan's American Gymnastics	Needham, Massachusetts
Kyla Ross	Gym-Max Gymnastics	Aliso Viejo, California
Emily Schild	Everest Gymnastics	Huntersville, North Carolina
MyKayla Skinner	Desert Lights Gymnastics	Gilbert, Arizona

Junior national team
Name	Club	Residence
Jordan Chiles	Naydenov Gymnastics	Vancouver, Washington
Christina Desiderio	Parkettes National Gymnastics Center	Hackettstown, New Jersey
Jazmyn Foberg	MG Elite	Bayville, New Jersey
Laurie Hernandez	MG Elite	Old Bridge, New Jersey
Emma Malabuyo	Texas Dreams Gymnastics	Flower Mound, Texas
Gabby Perea	Legacy Elite Gymnastics	Geneva, Illinois
Ragan Smith	Texas Dreams Gymnastics	Lewisville, Texas
Deanne Soza	Arete Gymnastics	Orem, Utah
Trinity Thomas	Prestige Gymnastics	York, Pennsylvania

=== 2014–15 ===
Senior national team
Name	Club	Residence
Alyssa Baumann	World Olympic Gymnastics Academy	Plano, Texas
Simone Biles	World Champions Centre	Spring, Texas
Nia Dennis	Buckeye Gymnastics	Westerville, Ohio
Madison Desch	Great American Gymnastics Express	Lenexa, Kansas
Gabby Douglas	Buckeye Gymnastics	Virginia Beach, Virginia
Brenna Dowell	Great American Gymnastics Express	Odessa, Missouri
Rachel Gowey	Chow's Gymnastics and Dance Institute	Urbandale, Iowa
Felicia Hano	Gym-Max Gymnastics	San Gabriel, California
Amelia Hundley	Cincinnati Gymnastics Academy	Hamilton, Ohio
Bailie Key	Texas Dreams Gymnastics	Montgomery, Texas
Madison Kocian	World Olympic Gymnastics Academy	Dallas, Texas
Ashton Locklear	Everest Gymnastics	Hamlet, North Carolina
Lauren Navarro	Charter Oak Gymnastics	La Verne, California
Maggie Nichols	Twin City Twisters	Little Canada, Minnesota
Aly Raisman	Brestyan's American Gymnastics	Needham, Massachusetts
Kyla Ross	Gym-Max Gymnastics	Aliso Viejo, California
Emily Schild	Everest Gymnastics	Huntersville, North Carolina
Megan Skaggs	Gymnastics Academy of Atlanta	Marietta, Georgia
MyKayla Skinner	Desert Lights Gymnastics	Gilbert, Arizona
Alexis Vasquez	Chow's Gymnastics and Dance Institute	West Des Moines, Iowa

Junior national team
Name	Club	Residence
Jordan Chiles	Naydenov Gymnastics	Vancouver, Washington
Norah Flatley	Chow's Gymnastics and Dance Institute	Cumming, Iowa
Jazmyn Foberg	MG Elite	Bayville, New Jersey
Emily Gaskins	Cincinnati Gymnastics Academy	Coral Springs, Florida
Laurie Hernandez	MG Elite	Old Bridge, New Jersey
Victoria Nguyen	Chow's Gymnastics and Dance Institute	West Des Moines, Iowa
Ragan Smith	Texas Dreams Gymnastics	Lewisville, Texas
Olivia Trautman	Twin City Twisters	Champlin, Minnesota

=== 2013–14 ===
Senior national team
Name	Club	Residence
Kennedy Baker	Texas Dreams Gymnastics	Flower Mound, Texas
Simone Biles	Bannon's Gymnastix	Spring, Texas
Madison Desch	Great American Gymnastics Express	Lenexa, Kansas
Brenna Dowell	Great American Gymnastics Express	Odessa, Missouri
Peyton Ernst	Texas Dreams Gymnastics	Coppell, Texas
Rachel Gowey	Chow's Gymnastics and Dance Institute	Urbandale, Iowa
Madison Kocian	World Olympic Gymnastics Academy	Dallas, Texas
McKayla Maroney	All Olympia Gymnastics Center	Long Beach, California
Maggie Nichols	Twin City Twisters	Little Canada, Minnesota
Elizabeth Price	Parkettes National Gymnastics Center	Coopersburg, Pennsylvania
Lexie Priessman	Cincinnati Gymnastics Academy	Cincinnati, Ohio
Kyla Ross	Gym-Max Gymnastics	Aliso Viejo, California
MyKayla Skinner	Desert Lights Gymnastics	Gilbert, Arizona

Junior national team
Name	Club	Residence
Alyssa Baumann	World Olympic Gymnastics Academy	Plano, Texas
Jordan Chiles	Naydenov Gymnastics	Vancouver, Washington
Nia Dennis	Buckeye Gymnastics	Westerville, Ohio
Norah Flatley	Chow's Gymnastics and Dance Institute	Cumming, Iowa
Emily Gaskins	Cincinnati Gymnastics Academy	Coral Springs, Florida
Laurie Hernandez	MG Elite	Old Bridge, New Jersey
Veronica Hults	Texas Dreams Gymnastics	Coppell, Texas
Amelia Hundley	Cincinnati Gymnastics Academy	Hamilton, Ohio
Bailie Key	Texas Dreams Gymnastics	Montgomery, Texas
Polina Shchennikova	Tigar Gymnastics	Arvada, Colorado
Ragan Smith	Northwind Gymnastics Center	Dacula, Georgia

=== 2012–13 ===
Senior national team
Name	Club	Residence
Kennedy Baker	Texas Dreams Gymnastics	Flower Mound, Texas
Rebecca Bross	World Olympic Gymnastics Academy	Plano, Texas
Gabby Douglas	Chow's Gymnastics and Dance Institute	Virginia Beach, Virginia
Brenna Dowell	Great American Gymnastics Express	Odessa, Missouri
Peyton Ernst	Texas Dreams Gymnastics	Coppell, Texas
Sarah Finnegan	Great American Gymnastics Express	St. Louis, Missouri
Anna Li	Legacy Elite Gymnastics	Geneva, Illinois
Nastia Liukin	World Olympic Gymnastics Academy	Parker, Texas
McKayla Maroney	All Olympia Gymnastics Center	Laguna Niguel, California
Maggie Nichols	Twin City Twisters	Little Canada, Minnesota
Elizabeth Price	Parkettes National Gymnastics Center	Coopersburg, Pennsylvania
Aly Raisman	Brestyan's American Gymnastics	Needham, Massachusetts
Kyla Ross	Gym-Max Gymnastics	Aliso Viejo, California
Alicia Sacramone	Brestyan's American Gymnastics	Winchester, Massachusetts
Bridget Sloan	Sharp's Gymnastics Academy	Pittsboro, Indiana
Sabrina Vega	Dynamic Gymnastics	Carmel, New York
Jordyn Wieber	Gedderts' Twistars	DeWitt, Michigan

Junior national team
Name	Club	Residence
Simone Biles	Bannon's Gymnastix	Spring, Texas
Nia Dennis	Buckeye Gymnastics	Westerville, Ohio
Madison Desch	Great American Gymnastics Express	Lenexa, Kansas
Laurie Hernandez	MG Elite	Old Bridge, New Jersey
Amelia Hundley	Cincinnati Gymnastics Academy	Hamilton, Ohio
Bailie Key	Texas Dreams Gymnastics	Coppell, Texas
Katelyn Ohashi	World Olympic Gymnastics Academy	Plano, Texas
Lexie Priessman	Cincinnati Gymnastics Academy	Cincinnati, Ohio
Polina Shchennikova	Tigar Gymnastics	Arvada, Colorado

=== 2011–12 ===
Senior national team
Name	Club	Residence
Rebecca Bross	World Olympic Gymnastics Academy	Plano, Texas
Bridgette Caquatto	Legacy Elite Gymnastics	Naperville, Illinois
Mackenzie Caquatto	Legacy Elite Gymnastics	Naperville, Illinois
Jessie DeZiel	Twin City Twisters	Rogers, Minnesota
Gabby Douglas	Chow's Gymnastics and Dance Institute	Virginia Beach, Virginia
Brandie Jay	GK Gymnastics	Fort Collins, Colorado
Amanda Jetter	Cincinnati Gymnastics Academy	Milford, Ohio
Shawn Johnson	Chow's Gymnastics and Dance Institute	West Des Moines, Iowa
Anna Li	Legacy Elite Gymnastics	Aurora, Illinois
Nastia Liukin	World Olympic Gymnastics Academy	Parker, Texas
McKayla Maroney	All Olympia Gymnastics Center	Laguna Niguel, California
Grace McLaughlin	World Olympic Gymnastics Academy	Allen, Texas
Chellsie Memmel	M&M Gymnastics	West Allis, Wisconsin
Hallie Mossett	West Coast Elite	Los Angeles, California
Aly Raisman	Brestyan's American Gymnastics	Needham, Massachusetts
Alicia Sacramone	Brestyan's American Gymnastics	Winchester, Massachusetts
Bridget Sloan	Sharp's Gymnastics Academy	Pittsboro, Indiana
Sabrina Vega	Dynamic Gymnastics	Carmel, New York
Jordyn Wieber	Gedderts' Twistars	DeWitt, Michigan
McKenzie Wofford	Zenith Gymnastics	McKinney, Texas

Junior national team
Name	Club	Residence
Kennedy Baker	Texas Dreams Gymnastics	Flower Mound, Texas
Brianna Brown	Cincinnati Gymnastics Academy	West Chester, Ohio
Madison Desch	Great American Gymnastics Express	Lenexa, Kansas
Brenna Dowell	Great American Gymnastics Express	Odessa, Missouri
Sarah Finnegan	Great American Gymnastics Express	Lake Latawanna, Missouri
Amelia Hundley	Cincinnati Gymnastics Academy	Hamilton, Ohio
Bailie Key	Texas Dreams Gymnastics	Coppell, Texas
Katelyn Ohashi	World Olympic Gymnastics Academy	Plano, Texas
Elizabeth Price	Parkettes National Gymnastics Center	Coopersburg, Pennsylvania
Lexie Priessman	Cincinnati Gymnastics Academy	Cincinnati, Ohio
Kyla Ross	Gym-Max Gymnastics	Aliso Viejo, California
MyKayla Skinner	Desert Lights Gymnastics	Gilbert, Arizona
Kiana Winston	Texas Dreams Gymnastics	Fort Worth, Texas

=== 2010–11 ===
Senior national team
Name	Club	Residence
Rebecca Bross	World Olympic Gymnastics Academy	Plano, Texas
Bridgette Caquatto	Legacy Elite Gymnastics	Naperville, Illinois
Mackenzie Caquatto	Legacy Elite Gymnastics	Naperville, Illinois
Chelsea Davis	Texas Dreams Gymnastics	Lakeway, Texas
Gabby Douglas	Excalibur Gymnastics	Virginia Beach, Virginia
Ivana Hong	World Olympic Gymnastics Academy	Allen, Texas
Kytra Hunter	Hill's Gymnastics	Frederick, Maryland
Amanda Jetter	Cincinnati Gymnastics Academy	Milford, Ohio
Shawn Johnson	Chow's Gymnastics and Dance Institute	West Des Moines, Iowa
Mattie Larson	All Olympia Gymnastics Center	Los Angeles, California
McKayla Maroney	All Olympia Gymnastics Center	Laguna Niguel, California
Aly Raisman	Brestyan's American Gymnastics	Needham, Massachusetts
Alicia Sacramone	Brestyan's American Gymnastics	Winchester, Massachusetts
Samantha Shapiro	All Olympia Gymnastics Center	Los Angeles, California
Bridget Sloan	Sharp's Gymnastics Academy	Pittsboro, Indiana
Morgan Smith	Brandy Johnson's Global Gymnastics	Clermont, Florida
Sabrina Vega	Dynamic Gymnastics	Carmel, New York
Cassandra Whitcomb	Cincinnati Gymnastics Academy	Cincinnati, Ohio
Jordyn Wieber	Gedderts' Twistars	DeWitt, Michigan
McKenzie Wofford	Zenith Gymnastics	McKinney, Texas
Vanessa Zamarripa	University of California, Los Angeles	Shiloh, Illinois

Junior national team
Name	Club	Residence
Kennedy Baker	Texas Dreams Gymnastics	Flower Mound, Texas
Brenna Dowell	Great American Gymnastics Express	Odessa, Missouri
Ericha Fassbender	Stars Gymnastics Training Center	Katy, Texas
Sarah Finnegan	Great American Gymnastics Express	Lake Latawanna, Missouri
Ariana Guerra	Stars Gymnastics Training Center	League City, Texas
Madison Kocian	World Olympic Gymnastics Academy	Dallas, Texas
Keely McNeer	Chow's Gymnastics and Dance Institute	West Des Moines, Iowa
Katelyn Ohashi	World Olympic Gymnastics Academy	Plano, Texas
Elizabeth Price	Parkettes National Gymnastics Center	Coopersburg, Pennsylvania
Lexie Priessman	Cincinnati Gymnastics Academy	Cincinnati, Ohio
Kyla Ross	Gym-Max Gymnastics	Aliso Viejo, California

== 2000s ==
=== 2009–10 ===
Senior national team
Name	Club	Residence
Jana Bieger	Bieger International Gymnastics	Coconut Creek, Florida
Rebecca Bross	World Olympic Gymnastics Academy	Plano, Texas
Mackenzie Caquatto	Naperville Gymnastics Club	Naperville, Illinois
Kaitlyn Clark	Precision Gymnastics	Rancho Cucamonga, California
Olivia Courtney	Orlando Metro Gymnastics	Orlando, Florida
Ivana Hong	World Olympic Gymnastics Academy	Lovejoy, Texas
Kytra Hunter	Hill's Gymnastics	Frederick, Maryland
Alaina Johnson	Texas East Gymnastics	Tyler, Texas
Mattie Larson	All Olympia Gymnastics Center	Los Angeles, California
Nastia Liukin	World Olympic Gymnastics Academy	Parker, Texas
Chellsie Memmel	M&M Gymnastics	West Allis, Wisconsin
Samantha Peszek	Sharp's Gymnastics Academy	Indianapolis, Indiana
Samantha Shapiro	All Olympia Gymnastics Center	Los Angeles, California
Bridget Sloan	Sharp's Gymnastics Academy	Pittsboro, Indiana
Cassandra Whitcomb	Cincinnati Gymnastics Academy	Cincinnati, Ohio
Kayla Williams	Gym Nest	Nitro, West Virginia

Junior national team
Name	Club	Residence
Bridgette Caquatto	Naperville Gymnastics Club	Naperville, Illinois
Briley Casanova	World Olympic Gymnastics Academy	Dallas, Texas
Sophina DeJesus	SCEGA Gymnastics	Temecula, California
Amanda Jetter	Cincinnati Gymnastics Academy	Milford, Ohio
Madison Kocian	World Olympic Gymnastics Academy	Dallas, Texas
Katelyn Ohashi	Great American Gymnastics Express	Independence, Missouri
Aly Raisman	Brestyan's American Gymnastics	Needham, Massachusetts
Kyla Ross	Gym-Max Gymnastics	Aliso Viejo, California
Morgan Smith	Brandy Johnson's Global Gymnastics	Clermont, Florida
Sabrina Vega	Dynamic Gymnastics	Carmel, New York
Jordyn Wieber	Gedderts' Twistars	DeWitt, Michigan

=== 2008–09 ===
Senior national team
Name	Club	Residence
Jana Bieger	Bieger International Gymnastics	Coconut Creek, Florida
Mackenzie Caquatto	Aerial Gymnastics Club	Naperville, Illinois
Olivia Courtney	Orlando Metro Gymnastics	Fairfax, Virginia
Chelsea Davis	Texas Dreams Gymnastics	Lakeway, Texas
Ivana Hong	Great American Gymnastics Express	Blue Springs, Missouri
Alaina Johnson	Texas East Gymnastics	Tyler, Texas
Shawn Johnson	Chow's Gymnastics and Dance Institute	West Des Moines, Iowa
Mattie Larson	All Olympia Gymnastics Center	Los Angeles, California
Nastia Liukin	World Olympic Gymnastics Academy	Parker, Texas
Corrie Lothrop	Hill's Gymnastics	Gaithersburg, Maryland
Chellsie Memmel	M&M Gymnastics	West Allis, Wisconsin
Samantha Peszek	DeVeau's School of Gymnastics	McCordsville, Indiana
Alicia Sacramone	Brestyan's American Gymnastics	Winchester, Massachusetts
Bridget Sloan	Sharp's Gymnastics Academy	Pittsboro, Indiana
Randy Stageberg	Excalibur Gymnastics	Chesapeake, Virginia
Shayla Worley	Orlando Metro Gymnastics	Orlando, Florida

Junior national team
Name	Club	Residence
Rebecca Bross	World Olympic Gymnastics Academy	Plano, Texas
Briley Casanova	World Olympic Gymnastics Academy	Dallas, Texas
Rebecca Clark	Great American Gymnastics Express	Blue Springs, Missouri
Amanda Jetter	Cincinnati Gymnastics Academy	Milford, Ohio
Randi Lau	What's Up Gymnastics	Honolulu, Hawaii
Annette Miele	Parkettes National Gymnastics Center	Easton, Pennsylvania
Kamerin Moore	Gedderts' Twistars	West Bloomfield, Michigan
Hallie Mossett	All Olympia Gymnastics Center	Los Angeles, California
Asi Peko	Brown's Gymnastics	Henderson, Nevada
Samantha Shapiro	All Olympia Gymnastics Center	Los Angeles, California
Sabrina Vega	Dynamic Gymnastics	Carmel, New York
Cassandra Whitcomb	Cincinnati Gymnastics Academy	Cincinnati, Ohio
Jordyn Wieber	Gedderts' Twistars	DeWitt, Michigan

=== 2007–08 ===
Senior national team
Name	Club	Residence
Jana Bieger	Bieger International Gymnastics	Coconut Creek, Florida
Darlene Hill	Will-Moor Gymnastics	Mount Laurel, New Jersey
Ivana Hong	Great American Gymnastics Express	Blue Springs, Missouri
Shawn Johnson	Chow's Gymnastics and Dance Institute	West Des Moines, Iowa
Natasha Kelley	Stars Gymnastics	Katy, Texas
Nastia Liukin	World Olympic Gymnastics Academy	Parker, Texas
Chellsie Memmel	M&M Gymnastics	West Allis, Wisconsin
Samantha Peszek	DeVeau's School of Gymnastics	Indianapolis, Indiana
Alicia Sacramone	Brestyan's American Gymnastics	Winchester, Massachusetts
Bridget Sloan	Sharp's Gymnastics Academy	Pittsboro, Indiana
Geralen Stack-Eaton	Parkettes National Gymnastics Center	Horsham, Pennsylvania
Amber Trani	Parkettes National Gymnastics Center	Richlandtown, Pennsylvania
Shayla Worley	Orlando Metro Gymnastics	Orlando, Florida

Junior national team
Name	Club	Residence
Rebecca Bross	World Olympic Gymnastics Academy	Plano, Texas
Rebecca Clark	Great American Gymnastics Express	Blue Springs, Missouri
Olivia Courtney	Orlando Metro Gymnastics	Orlando, Florida
Rheagan Courville	Elite Gymnastics	Baton Rouge, Louisiana
Chelsea Davis	Texas Dreams Gymnastics	Lakeway, Texas
Sarah DeMeo	Great American Gymnastics Express	Overland Park, Kansas
Mattie Larson	All Olympia Gymnastics Center	Los Angeles, California
Corrie Lothrop	Hill's Gymnastics	Gaithersburg, Maryland
Samantha Shapiro	All Olympia Gymnastics Center	Los Angeles, California
Morgan Smith	Brandy Johnson's Global Gymnastics	Clermont, Florida
Ashley Stott	SCEGA Gymnastics	Temecula, California
Cassandra Whitcomb	Cincinnati Gymnastics Academy	Cincinnati, Ohio
Jordyn Wieber	Gedderts' Twistars	DeWitt, Michigan

=== 2006–07 ===
Senior national team
Name	Club	Residence
Jana Bieger	Boca Twisters	Coconut Creek, Florida
Kayla Hoffman	Rebound Gymnastics	Union, New Jersey
Jacquelyn Johnson	Cincinnati Gymnastics Academy	West Chester, Ohio
Natasha Kelley	Stars Gymnastics	Katy, Texas
Nastia Liukin	World Olympic Gymnastics Academy	Parker, Texas
Chellsie Memmel	M&M Gymnastics	West Allis, Wisconsin
Christine Nguyen	World Olympic Gymnastics Academy	Plano, Texas
Kassi Price	Orlando Metro Gymnastics	Plantation, Florida
Ashley Priess	Cincinnati Gymnastics Academy	Hamilton, Ohio
Alicia Sacramone	Brestyan's American Gymnastics	Winchester, Massachusetts
Randy Stageberg	Excalibur Gymnastics	Chesapeake, Virginia
Amber Trani	Parkettes National Gymnastics Center	Richlandtown, Pennsylvania
Shayla Worley	Orlando Metro Gymnastics	Orlando, Florida

Junior national team
Name	Club	Residence
Rebecca Bross	World Olympic Gymnastics Academy	Ann Arbor, Michigan
Sarah DeMeo	Great American Gymnastics Express	Overland Park, Kansas
Bianca Flohr	Cincinnati Gymnastics Academy	Creston, Ohio
Ivana Hong	Great American Gymnastics Express	Laguna Hills, California
Shawn Johnson	Chow's Gymnastics and Dance Institute	Des Moines, Iowa
Corrie Lothrop	Hill's Gymnastics	Gaithersburg, Maryland
Catherine Nguyen	World Olympic Gymnastics Academy	Plano, Texas
Shantessa Pama	Gym-Max Gymnastics	Dana Point, California
Samantha Peszek	DeVeau's School of Gymnastics	McCordsville, Indiana
Samantha Shapiro	All Olympia Gymnastics Center	Los Angeles, California
Bridget Sloan	Sharp's Gymnastics Academy	Pittsboro, Indiana
Rachel Updike	Great American Gymnastics Express	Overland Park, Kansas
Cassandra Whitcomb	Cincinnati Gymnastics Academy	Cincinnati, Ohio
Jordyn Wieber	Gedderts' Twistars	DeWitt, Michigan

=== 2005–06 ===
Senior national team
Name	Club	Residence
Jana Bieger	Boca Twisters	Coconut Creek, Florida
Kristina Comforte	Illinois Gymnastics Institute	Burr Ridge, Illinois
Annie DiLuzio	Byers Gymnastics Center	Folsom, California
Kayla Hoffman	Rebound Gymnastics	Union, New Jersey
Jacquelyn Johnson	Cincinnati Gymnastics Academy	West Chester, Ohio
Nastia Liukin	World Olympic Gymnastics Academy	Parker, Texas
Hilary Mauro	Cincinnati Gymnastics Academy	West Chester, Ohio
Brittani McCullough	SCEGA Gymnastics	Corona, California
Chellsie Memmel	M&M Gymnastics	West Allis, Wisconsin
Kassi Price	Orlando Metro Gymnastics	Plantation, Florida
Alicia Sacramone	Brestyan's American Gymnastics	Winchester, Massachusetts
Sarah Shire	Great American Gymnastics Express	Sweet Springs, Missouri

Junior national team
Name	Club	Residence
Cortni Beers	Krafft Academy of Gymnastics	Tulsa, Oklahoma
Rebecca Bross	World Olympic Gymnastics Academy	Ann Arbor, Michigan
Sarah DeMeo	Great American Gymnastics Express	Overland Park, Kansas
Morgan Evans	Excalibur Gymnastics	Norfolk, Virginia
Bianca Flohr	Flytz Gymnastics	Creston, Ohio
Ivana Hong	Great American Gymnastics Express	Laguna Hills, California
Shawn Johnson	Chow's Gymnastics and Dance Institute	Des Moines, Iowa
Natasha Kelley	Brown's Gymnastics	Houston, Texas
Shantessa Pama	Gym-Max Gymnastics	Dana Point, California
Samantha Peszek	DeVeau's School of Gymnastics	McCordsville, Indiana
Monica Shoji	Cincinnati Gymnastics Academy	Boston, Massachusetts
Bridget Sloan	Sharp's Gymnastics Academy	Pittsboro, Indiana
Randy Stageberg	Excalibur Gymnastics	Chesapeake, Virginia
Makayla Stambaugh	Byers Gymnastics Center	Sacramento, California
Amber Trani	Parkettes National Gymnastics Center	Richlandtown, Pennsylvania
Shayla Worley	Orlando Metro Gymnastics	Orlando, Florida

=== 2004–05 ===
Senior national team
Name	Club	Residence
Mohini Bhardwaj	All Olympia Gymnastics Center	Colorado Springs, Colorado
Annie DiLuzio	Byers Gymnastics Center	Folsom, California
Kelly Fee	Illinois Gymnastics Institute	St. Charles, Illinois
Nicole Harris	Parkettes National Gymnastics Center	Lido Beach, New York
Annia Hatch	Stars Academy	West Haven, Connecticut
Katie Heenan	Capital Gymnastics National Training Center	South Riding, Virginia
Terin Humphrey	Great American Gymnastics Express	Helena, Missouri
Allyse Ishino	Charter Oak Gymnastics	Santa Ana, California
Carly Janiga	Desert Devils Gymnastics	Paradise Valley, Arizona
Courtney Kupets	Hill's Gymnastics	Gaithersburg, Maryland
Brittany Magee	Texas Dreams Gymnastics	Arlington, Texas
Courtney McCool	Great American Gymnastics Express	Lee's Summit, Missouri
Chellsie Memmel	M&M Gymnastics	West Allis, Wisconsin
Marcia Newby	Excalibur Gymnastics	Virginia Beach, Virginia
Tia Orlando	Parkettes National Gymnastics Center	Macungie, Pennsylvania
Carly Patterson	World Olympic Gymnastics Center	Allen, Texas
Ashley Postell	Capital Gymnastics National Training Center	Burke, Virginia
Alicia Sacramone	Brestyan's American Gymnastics	Winchester, Massachusetts
Tasha Schwikert	GymCats	Las Vegas, Nevada
Sarah Shire	Great American Gymnastics Express	Sweet Springs, Missouri
Melanie Sinclair	Orlando Metro Gymnastics	Orlando, Florida
Liz Tricase	Illinois Gymnastics Institute	Itasca, Illinois
Hollie Vise	World Olympic Gymnastics Academy	Dallas, Texas
Tabitha Yim	Charter Oak Gymnastics	Irvine, California

Junior national team
Name	Club	Residence
Cortni Beers	Krafft Academy of Gymnastics	Tulsa, Oklahoma
Jana Bieger	Boca Twisters	Coconut Creek, Florida
Meghan Blair	Dallas Gymnastics Center	Dallas, Texas
Morgan Evans	Excalibur Gymnastics	Norfolk, Virginia
Bianca Flohr	Flytz Gymnastics	Creston, Ohio
Austyn Fobes	Rebound Gymnastics	Howell, New Jersey
Natasha Kelley	Brown's Gymnastics	Katy, Texas
Nastia Liukin	World Olympic Gymnastics Academy	Plano, Texas
Shantessa Pama	Gym-Max Gymnastics	Dana Point, California
Samantha Peszek	DeVeau's School of Gymnastics	McCordsville, Indiana
Kassi Price	Orlando Metro Gymnastics	Plantation, Florida
Ashley Priess	Cincinnati Gymnastics Academy	Hamilton, Ohio
Makayla Stambaugh	Byers Gymnastics Center	Sacramento, California
Shayla Worley	Orlando Metro Gymnastics	Orlando, Florida

=== 2003–04 ===
Senior national team
Name	Club	Residence
Kristina Comforte	Illinois Gymnastics Institute	Burr Ridge, Illinois
Nicole Harris	Parkettes National Gymnastics Center	Allentown, Pennsylvania
Corey Hartung	Hill's Gymnastics	Gaithersburg, Maryland
Annia Hatch	Stars Academy	West Haven, Connecticut
Katie Heenan	Capital Gymnastics National Training Center	South Riding, Virginia
Terin Humphrey	Great American Gymnastics Express	Bates City, Missouri
Allyse Ishino	Charter Oak Gymnastics	Santa Ana, California
Susan Jackson	Brown's Gymnastics	Spring, Texas
Nina Kim	World Olympic Gymnastics Academy	Plano, Texas
Courtney Kupets	Hill's Gymnastics	Gaithersburg, Maryland
Chellsie Memmel	Salto Gymnastics	West Allis, Wisconsin
Marcia Newby	Excalibur Gymnastics	Virginia Beach, Virginia
Tia Orlando	Parkettes National Gymnastics Center	Macungie, Pennsylvania
Carly Patterson	World Olympic Gymnastics Academy	Allen, Texas
Ashley Postell	Capital Gymnastics National Training Center	Burke, Virginia
Alicia Sacramone	Brestyan's American Gymnastics	Winchester, Massachusetts
Tasha Schwikert	GymCats	Las Vegas, Nevada
Samantha Sheehan	Cincinnati Gymnastics Academy	Villa Hills, Kentucky
Sarah Shire	Great American Gymnastics Express	Sweet Springs, Missouri
Melanie Sinclair	Orlando Metro Gymnastics	Orlando, Florida
Liz Tricase	Illinois Gymnastics Institute	Itasca, Illinois
Hollie Vise	World Olympic Gymnastics Academy	Dallas, Texas
Tabitha Yim	Charter Oak Gymnastics	Irvine, California

Junior national team
Name	Club	Residence
Jana Bieger	Boca Twisters	Coconut Creek, Florida
Shavahn Church	SCATS Gymnastics	Tarzana, California
Bianca Flohr	Flytz Gymnastics	Creston, Ohio
Ashley Jenkins	Charter Oak Gymnastics	Laguna Niguel, California
Nastia Liukin	World Olympic Gymnastics Academy	Plano, Texas
Courtney McCool	Great American Gymnastics Express	Lee's Summit, Missouri
Casey Overton	Excalibur Gymnastics	Virginia Beach, Virginia
Kassi Price	Orlando Metro Gymnastics	Plantation, Florida
Ashley Priess	Cincinnati Gymnastics Academy	Hamilton, Ohio
Geralen Stack-Eaton	Parkettes National Gymnastics Center	Horsham, Pennsylvania
Caitlin Sullivan	Cincinnati Gymnastics Academy	Hamilton, Ohio
Shayla Worley	Orlando Metro Gymnastics	Orlando, Florida

=== 2002–03 ===
Senior national team
Name	Club	Residence
Nicole Childs	World Olympic Gymnastics Academy	Plano, Texas
Annia Hatch	Stars Academy	West Haven, Connecticut
Katie Heenan	Capital Gymnastics National Training Center	South Riding, Virginia
Terin Humphrey	Great American Gymnastics Express	Bates City, Missouri
Nina Kim	World Olympic Gymnastics Academy	Plano, Texas
Ashley Kupets	Hill's Gymnastics	Gaithersburg, Maryland
Courtney Kupets	Hill's Gymnastics	Gaithersburg, Maryland
Ashley Miles	University of Alabama	San Antonio, Texas
Ashley Postell	Capital Gymnastics National Training Center	Burke, Virginia
Tasha Schwikert	GymCats	Las Vegas, Nevada
Samantha Sheehan	Cincinnati Gymnastics Academy	Villa Hills, Kentucky
Liz Tricase	Illinois Gymnastics Institute	Itasca, Illinois
Kristal Uzelac	Parkettes National Gymnastics Center	Whitehall, Pennsylvania
Tabitha Yim	Charter Oak Gymnastics	Irvine, California

Junior national team
Name	Club	Residence
Kristina Comforte	Illinois Gymnastics Institute	Burr Ridge, Illinois
Sarah Curtis	Oregon State University	Corvallis, Oregon
Annie Fogerty	Parkettes National Gymnastics Center	Allentown, Pennsylvania
Nicole Harris	Parkettes National Gymnastics Center	Allentown, Pennsylvania
Allyse Ishino	Charter Oak Gymnastics	Santa Ana, California
Susan Jackson	Brown's Gymnastics	Spring, Texas
Carly Janiga	Desert Devils Gymnastics	Paradise Valley, Arizona
Nastia Liukin	World Olympic Gymnastics Academy	Plano, Texas
Chellsie Memmel	Salto Gymnastics	West Allis, Wisconsin
Marcia Newby	Excalibur Gymnastics	Virginia Beach, Virginia
Tia Orlando	Parkettes National Gymnastics Center	Macungie, Pennsylvania
Carly Patterson	World Olympic Gymnastics Academy	Allen, Texas
Kassi Price	American Twisters Gymnastics	Plantation, Florida
Sarah Shire	Great American Gymnastics Express	Sweet Springs, Missouri
Melanie Sinclair	Orlando Metro Gymnastics	Orlando, Florida
Hollie Vise	World Olympic Gymnastics Academy	Dallas, Texas

=== 2001–02 ===
Senior national team
Name	Club	Residence
Mohini Bhardwaj	All Olympia Gymnastics Center	Los Angeles, California
Dana Filetti	Excalibur Gymnastics	Chesapeake, Virginia
Natalie Foley	Colorado Aerials	Englewood, Colorado
Annia Hatch	Stars Academy	West Haven, Connecticut
Katie Heenan	Capital Gymnastics National Training Center	South Riding, Virginia
Katie Kivisto	American Twisters Gymnastics	Boca Raton, Florida
Brittney Koncak	Harris Unlimited Gymnastics School	San Antonio, Texas
Ashley Miles	Harris Unlimited Gymnastics School	San Antonio, Texas
Ashley Miller	North Stars Gymnastics Academy	Brodheadsville, Pennsylvania
Tasha Schwikert	GymCats	Las Vegas, Nevada
Amanda Stroud	SCEGA Gymnastics	Temecula, California
Rachel Tidd	SCEGA Gymnastics	San Marcos, California
Lindsey Vanden Eykel	World Olympic Gymnastics Academy	Plano, Texas
Morgan White	Cincinnati Gymnastics Academy	Fairfield, Ohio
Tabitha Yim	Charter Oak Gymnastics	Irvine, California

Junior national team
Name	Club	Residence
Meagan Browning	Brown's Gymnastics	Deer Park, Texas
Sarah Curtis	American Elite Gymnastics	Corvallis, Oregon
Jalynne Dantzscher	Charter Oak Gymnastics	San Dimas, California
Annie Fogerty	Parkettes National Gymnastics Center	Allentown, Pennsylvania
Terin Humphrey	Great American Gymnastics Express	Bates City, Missouri
Allyse Ishino	Charter Oak Gymnastics	Santa Ana, California
Susan Jackson	Brown's Gymnastics	Spring, Texas
Krista Jasper	Parkettes National Gymnastics Center	Birchrunville, Pennsylvania
Nina Kim	World Olympic Gymnastics Academy	Houston, Texas
Courtney Kupets	Hill's Gymnastics	Gaithersburg, Maryland
Courtney McCool	Great American Gymnastics Express	Kansas City, Missouri
Chellsie Memmel	Salto Gymnastics	West Allis, Wisconsin
Tia Orlando	Parkettes National Gymnastics Center	Macungie, Pennsylvania
Carly Patterson	World Olympic Gymnastics Academy	Allen, Texas
Ashley Postell	Capital Gymnastics National Training Center	Mitchellville, Maryland
Kassi Price	American Twisters Gymnastics	Plantation, Florida
Maria Scaffidi	Cincinnati Gymnastics Academy	Hamilton, Ohio
Jordan Schwikert	GymCats	Las Vegas, Nevada
Melanie Sinclair	Orlando Metro Gymnastics	Orlando, Florida
Grace Taylor	Aiken Gymnastics	Aiken, South Carolina
Liz Tricase	Illinois Gymnastics Institute	Itasca, Illinois
Kristal Uzelac	Parkettes National Gymnastics Center	Whitehall, Pennsylvania
Hollie Vise	World Olympic Gymnastics Academy	Dallas, Texas
Kaitlin White	World Olympic Gymnastics Academy	Allen, Texas
Rebekah Zaiser	X-Cel Gymnastics	Mars, Pennsylvania

=== 2000–01 ===
Senior national team
Name	Club	Residence
Jeanette Antolin	SCATS Gymnastics	Huntington Beach, California
Vanessa Atler	World Olympic Gymnastics Academy	Canyon Country, California
Kendall Beck	Parkettes National Gymnastics Center	Stanford, California
Alyssa Beckerman	Cincinnati Gymnastics Academy	Cincinnati, Ohio
Monique Chang	Capital Gymnastics National Training Center	Fairfax Station, Virginia
Amy Chow	West Valley Gymnastics School	San Jose, California
Jamie Dantzscher	Charter Oak Gymnastics	San Dimas, California
Dominique Dawes	Hill's Gymnastics	Silver Spring, Maryland
Mylan Dodd	Cascade Elite Gymnastics	Seattle, Washington
Erinn Dooley	Hill's Gymnastics	Gaithersburg, Maryland
Annabeth Eberle	Starz Gymnastics	Reno, Nevada
Marie Fjordholm	International Gymnastics Academy	The Woodlands, Texas
Cory Fritzinger	Excalibur Gymnastics	Virginia Beach, Virginia
Ashley Kelly	International Gymnastics Academy	The Woodlands, Texas
Kristen Maloney	Parkettes National Gymnastics Center	Pen Argyl, Pennsylvania
Dominique Moceanu	Cincinnati Gymnastics Academy	Springdale, Ohio
Elise Ray	Hill's Gymnastics	Columbia, Maryland
Tasha Schwikert	GymCats	Las Vegas, Nevada
Larissa Stewart	Bart Conner Gymnastics Academy	Healdton, Oklahoma
Amanda Stroud	SCEGA Gymnastics	Temecula, California
Rachel Tidd	SCEGA Gymnastics	San Marcos, California
Morgan White	Cincinnati Gymnastics Academy	Fairfield, Ohio
Lindsay Wing	Hill's Gymnastics	Rockville, Maryland

Junior national team
Name	Club	Residence
Melissa Chan	Airborne Gymnastics	Los Gatos, California
Lisa Colwell	Krafft Academy of Gymnastics	Tulsa, Oklahoma
Stephanie Gentry	World Olympic Gymnastics Academy	Plano, Texas
Katie Heenan	Capital Gymnastics National Training Center	Burke, Virginia
Terin Humphrey	Great American Gymnastics Express	Bates City, Missouri
Susan Jackson	Brown's Gymnastics	Spring, Texas
Kassandra Kanalas	Harris Unlimited Gymnastics	San Antonio, Texas
Nina Kim	Brown's Gymnastics	Houston, Texas
Chellsie Memmel	Salto Gymnastics	West Allis, Wisconsin
Ashley Miles	Harris Unlimited Gymnastics	San Antonio, Texas
Carly Patterson	World Olympic Gymnastics Academy	Allen, Texas
Chelsea Plourde	Flips USA Gymnastics	Reno, Nevada
Ashley Postell	Capital Gymnastics National Training Center	Mitchellville, Maryland
Maria Scaffidi	LaFleur's Gymnastics	Sussex, Wisconsin
Melanie Sinclair	Orlando Metro Gymnastics	Orlando, Florida
Kristal Uzelac	Parkettes National Gymnastics Center	Whitehall, Pennsylvania
Lindsey Vanden Eykel	World Olympic Gymnastics Academy	Plano, Texas
Hollie Vise	World Olympic Gymnastics Academy	Dallas, Texas
Elise Wheeler	SCEGA Gymnastics	San Diego, California
Kaitlin White	World Olympic Gymnastics Academy	Allen, Texas
Lori Winn	Dynamo Gymnastics	Oklahoma City, Oklahoma
Tabitha Yim	Charter Oak Gymnastics	Irvine, California

== 1990s ==
=== 1999–2000 ===
Senior national team
Name	Club	Residence
Jeanette Antolin	SCATS Gymnastics	Huntington Beach, California
Vanessa Atler	World Olympic Gymnastics Academy	Canyon Country, California
Angela Beam	Bart Conner Gymnastics Academy	Norman, Oklahoma
Kendall Beck	Parkettes National Gymnastics Center	Pen Argyl, Pennsylvania
Alyssa Beckerman	Cincinnati Gymnastics Academy	Cincinnati, Ohio
Stephanie Carter	Ricochets Gymnastics	Bryn Athyn, Pennsylvania
Monique Chang	Capital Gymnastics National Training Center	Fairfax Station, Virginia
Amy Chow	West Valley Gymnastics School	San Jose, California
Jamie Dantzscher	Charter Oak Gymnastics	San Dimas, California
Mylan Dodd	Cascade Elite Gymnastics	Seattle, Washington
Erinn Dooley	Hill's Gymnastics	Gaithersburg, Maryland
Annabeth Eberle	Starz Gymnastics	Reno, Nevada
Michelle Emmons	Brown's Gymnastics	Pearland, Texas
Marie Fjordholm	World Olympic Gymnastics Academy	Frisco, Texas
Katie Hardman	National Elite Gymnastics	Buda, Texas
Kristen Maloney	Parkettes National Gymnastics Center	Pen Argyl, Pennsylvania
Carri Nagle	Parkettes National Gymnastics Center	Whitehall, Pennsylvania
Robin Phelps	Hill's Gymnastics	Rockville, Maryland
Dana Pierce	Wright's Gymnastics	Advance, Indiana
Elise Ray	Hill's Gymnastics	Columbia, Maryland
Sierra Sapunar	Cincinnati Gymnastics Academy	Wyoming, Ohio
Tasha Schwikert	GymCats	Las Vegas, Nevada
Brittany Smith	Excel Gymnastics	Fairfield, Ohio
Marline Stephens	Brown's Gymnastics	Houston, Texas
Kristen Stucky	Salto Gymnastics	Menomonee Falls, Wisconsin
Jennie Thompson	Cincinnati Gymnastics Academy	Cincinnati, Ohio
Morgan White	Cincinnati Gymnastics Academy	Fairfield, Ohio
Lindsay Wing	Hill's Gymnastics	Rockville, Maryland
Kim Zmeskal	Cincinnati Gymnastics Academy	Fairfield, Ohio

Junior national team
Name	Club	Residence
Ashlee Bradley	Dynamo Gymnastics	Oklahoma City, Oklahoma
Janae Cox	Southern Indiana Gymnastics	Otisco, Indiana
Whitney Ferguson	Parkettes National Gymnastics Center	Cincinnati, Ohio
Katie Heenan	Capital Gymnastics National Training Center	Burke, Virginia
Terin Humphrey	Great American Gymnastics Express	Bates City, Missouri
Brittney Koncak	Harris Unlimited Gymnastics	McQueeney, Texas
Courtney Kupets	Hill's Gymnastics	McLean, Virginia
Lisa Marzan	Exper-Tiess	Nesconset, New York
Chellsie Memmel	Salto Gymnastics	West Allis, Wisconsin
Ashley Miles	Harris Unlimited Gymnastics	San Antonio, Texas
Ashley Postell	Hill's Gymnastics	Mitchellville, Maryland
Melanie Sinclair	Orlando Metro Gymnastics	Orlando, Florida
Larissa Stewart	Bart Conner Gymnastics Academy	Healdton, Oklahoma
Amanda Stroud	Great American Gymnastics Express	Blue Springs, Missouri
Glyn Sweets	Hill's Gymnastics	Reston, Virginia
Brittany Talbert	World Olympic Gymnastics Academy	Plano, Texas
Brittany Thome	Champions Gymnastics	Sugar Land, Texas
Rachel Tidd	SCEGA Gymnastics	San Marcos, California
Kristal Uzelac	Parkettes National Gymnastics Center	Whitehall, Pennsylvania
Lindsey Vanden Eykel	World Olympic Gymnastics Academy	Plano, Texas
Hollie Vise	World Olympic Gymnastics Academy	Dallas, Texas
Kaitlin White	World Olympic Gymnastics Academy	Allen, Texas
Tabitha Yim	Charter Oak Gymnastics	Irvine, California

=== 1998–99 ===
Senior national team
Name	Club	Residence
Jeanette Antolin	SCATS Gymnastics	Huntington Beach, California
Vanessa Atler	Charter Oak Gymnastics	Canyon Country, California
Angela Beam	Bart Conner Gymnastics Academy	Norman, Oklahoma
Kendall Beck	Parkettes National Gymnastics Center	Pen Argyl, Pennsylvania
Alyssa Beckerman	Cincinnati Gymnastics Academy	Cincinnati, Ohio
Chelsa Byrd	River City Gymnastics	North Little Rock, Arkansas
Jennifer Carow	Salto Gymnastics	Hertland, Wisconsin
Jamie Dantzscher	SCATS Gymnastics	Palmdale, California
Erinn Dooley	Hill's Gymnastics	Gaithersburg, Maryland
Cory Fritzinger	Excalibur Gymnastics	Virginia Beach, Virginia
Betsy Hamm	University of Florida	Waukesha, Wisconsin
Alecia Ingram	Parkettes National Gymnastics Center	Bethlehem, Pennsylvania
Sheehan Lemley	Parkettes National Gymnastics Center	Hellertown, Pennsylvania
Kristen Maloney	Parkettes National Gymnastics Center	Pen Argyl, Pennsylvania
Katie McFarland	Excalibur Gymnastics	Virginia Beach, Virginia
Dominique Moceanu	United States Olympic Training Center	Colorado Springs, Colorado
Robin Phelps	Hill's Gymnastics	Rockville, Maryland
Elise Ray	Hill's Gymnastics	Columbia, Maryland
Jeana Rice	Ace Gymnastics	Longwood, Florida
Breanne Rutherford	New England Gym Express	Simsbury, Connecticut
Sierra Sapunar	Cincinnati Gymnastics Academy	Wyoming, Ohio
Tasha Schwikert	GymCats	Las Vegas, Nevada
Brittany Smith	Cincinnati Gymnastics Academy	Fairfield, Ohio
Marline Stephens	Brown's Gymnastics	Houston, Texas
Kristen Stucky	Salto Gymnastics	Menomonee Falls, Wisconsin
Jennie Thompson	Cincinnati Gymnastics Academy	Cincinnati, Ohio
Morgan White	Cincinnati Gymnastics Academy	Fairfield, Ohio
Lindsay Wing	Huntsville Gymnastics Center	Huntsville, Alabama
Kim Zmeskal	Cincinnati Gymnastics Academy	Fairfield, Ohio

Junior national team
Name	Club	Residence
Melinda Baimbridge	Acro Sport Shreveport	Houston, Texas
Ashlee Bradley	Dynamo Gymnastics	Fairfield, Ohio
Stephanie Carter	Ricochets Gymnastics	Bryn Athyn, Pennsylvania
Melissa Chan	Airborne Gymnastics	Los Gatos, California
Monique Chang	Capital Gymnastics National Training Center	Fairfax Station, Virginia
Janae Cox	Southern Indiana Gymnastics	Otisco, Indiana
Mylan Dodd	Cascade Elite Gymnastics	Seattle, Washington
Annabeth Eberle	Starz Gymnastics	Reno, Nevada
Michelle Emmons	Brown's Gymnastics	Pearland, Texas
Marie Fjordholm	World Olympic Gymnastics Academy	Frisco, Texas
Audra Fraim	Dynamo Gymnastics	Edmond, Oklahoma
Katie Heenan	Capital Gymnastics National Training Center	Burke, Virginia
Katie Hardman	National Elite Gymnastics	Buda, Texas
Brittney Koncak	Harris Unlimited Gymnastics	McQueeney, Texas
Courtney Kupets	Hill's Gymnastics	McLean, Virginia
Carri Nagle	Parkettes National Gymnastics Center	Whitehall, Pennsylvania
Jackie Nguyen	West Valley Gymnastics School	Atherton, California
Jennifer Orlando	Karon's Gymnastics	Herndon, Virginia
Ashley Postell	Hill's Gymnastics	Mitchellville, Maryland
Breasha Pruitt	Parkettes National Gymnastics Center	Henderson, Kentucky
Brittany Thome	Champions Gymnastics	Sugar Land, Texas
Kristin Thome	Champions Gymnastics	Sugar Land, Texas
Kristal Uzelac	Parkettes National Gymnastics Center	Whitehall, Pennsylvania
Hollie Vise	World Olympic Gymnastics Academy	Dallas, Texas
Tabitha Yim	Charter Oak Gymnastics	Irvine, California

=== 1997–98 ===
Senior national team
Name	Club	Residence
Jeanette Antolin	SCATS Gymnastics	Huntington Beach, California
Mary Beth Arnold	Cincinnati Gymnastics Academy	Fairfield, Ohio
Vanessa Atler	Charter Oak Gymnastics	Canyon Country, California
Kendall Beck	Cypress Academy	San Antonio, Texas
Alyssa Beckerman	North Stars Gymnastics Academy	Red Bank, New Jersey
Mohini Bhardwaj	University of California, Los Angeles	Cincinnati, Ohio
Shannon Bowles	Utah Gymnastics	Salt Lake City, Utah
Jamie Dantzscher	Charter Oak Gymnastics	Palmdale, California
Dominique Dawes	Hill's Gymnastics	Silver Spring, Maryland
Kaitlyn Dyson	Cypress Academy	Conroe, Texas
Cory Fritzinger	Excalibur Gymnastics	Virginia Beach, Virginia
Alecia Ingram	SCATS Gymnastics	Fountain Valley, California
Theresa Kulikowski	Colorado Aerials	Colorado Springs, Colorado
Kristen Maloney	Parkettes National Gymnastics Center	Pen Argyl, Pennsylvania
Becky Meldrum	Parkettes National Gymnastics Center	Merztown, Pennsylvania
Dominique Moceanu	Moceanu Gymnastics	Houston, Texas
Kelly Parkinson	Cypress Academy	Houston, Texas
Andree Pickens	Cypress Academy	Houston, Texas
Kristy Powell	Cincinnati Gymnastics Academy	Fairfield, Ohio
Elise Ray	Hill's Gymnastics	Columbia, Maryland
Jeana Rice	Ace Gymnastics	Longwood, Florida
Sierra Sapunar	Cincinnati Gymnastics Academy	Wyoming, Ohio
Kathleen Shrieves	MarVaTeens Gymnastics	Athens, Georgia
Brittany Smith	Cincinnati Gymnastics Academy	Fairfield, Ohio
Kristen Stucky	Salto Gymnastics	Menomonee Falls, Wisconsin
Katie Teft	Gedderts' Twistars	Grand Rapids, Michigan
Jennie Thompson	Cincinnati Gymnastics Academy	Cincinnati, Ohio
Raegan Tomasek	Hill's Gymnastics	Gaithersburg, Maryland
Lindsay Wing	Cypress Academy	Cypress, Texas
Amy Young	Gym-Max Gymnastics	Diamond Bar, California

Junior national team
Name	Club	Residence
Melinda Baimbridge	Texas Sports Ranch	Houston, Texas
Alexis Brion	Gymstrada	Virginia Beach, Virginia
Stephanie Carter	Ricochets Gymnastics	Bryn Athyn, Pennsylvania
Monique Chang	Capital Gymnastics National Training Center	Fairfax Station, Virginia
Janae Cox	Southern Indiana Gymnastics	Otisco, Indiana
Erinn Dooley	Hill's Gymnastics	Gaithersburg, Maryland
Annabeth Eberle	Starz Gymnastics	Reno, Nevada
Audra Fraim	Dynamo Gymnastics	Edmond, Oklahoma
Rachel Glasmire	Parkettes National Gymnastics Center	Center Valley, Pennsylvania
Katie Hardman	Cypress Academy	Houston, Texas
Sheehan Lemley	Parkettes National Gymnastics Center	Hellertown, Pennsylvania
Alexis Maday	MarVaTeens	Frederick, Maryland
Ashley Miles	Cypress Academy	San Antonio, Texas
Carri Nagle	Parkettes National Gymnastics Center	Whitehall, Pennsylvania
Robin Phelps	Hill's Gymnastics	Rockville, Maryland
Julie Pigg	Dynamo Gymnastics	Edmond, Oklahoma
Ashley Postell	Capital Gymnastics National Training Center	Mitchellville, Maryland
Breasha Pruitt	Cypress Academy	Henderson, Kentucky
Christy Ray	Hill's Gymnastics	Germantown, Maryland
Tasha Schwikert	GymCats	Las Vegas, Nevada
Marline Stephens	Cypress Academy	Houston, Texas
Brittany Thome	Cypress Academy	Sugar Land, Texas
Kristin Thome	Cypress Academy	Sugar Land, Texas
Kristal Uzelac	Parkettes National Gymnastics Center	Whitehall, Pennsylvania
Morgan White	Cincinnati Gymnastics Academy	Fairfield, Ohio

=== 1996–97 ===
Senior national team
Name	Club	Residence
Mary Beth Arnold	Flips USA Gymnastics	Sparks, Nevada
Mohini Bhardwaj	Brown's Gymnastics	Houston, Texas
Amanda Borden	Cincinnati Gymnastics Academy	Cincinnati, Ohio
Amy Chow	West Valley Gymnastics School	San Jose, California
Dominique Dawes	Hill's Gymnastics	College Park, Maryland
Monica Flammer	North West All Star Gymnastics	Spring, Texas
Larissa Fontaine	Hill's Gymnastics	Silver Spring, Maryland
Alecia Ingram	Technix	Folsom, California
Theresa Kulikowski	Colorado Aerials	Colorado Springs, Colorado
Kristen Maloney	Parkettes National Gymnastics Center	Pen Argyl, Pennsylvania
Shannon Miller	Dynamo Gymnastics	Edmond, Oklahoma
Dominique Moceanu	Karolyi Gymnastics	Spring, Texas
Jaycie Phelps	Cincinnati Gymnastics Academy	Cincinnati, Ohio
Andree Pickens	Cypress Academy	Houston, Texas
Kristy Powell	Colorado Aerials	Colorado Springs, Colorado
Kerri Strug	Karolyi Gymnastics	Tucson, Arizona
Katie Teft	Gedderts' Twistars	Grand Rapids, Michigan
Jennie Thompson	Dynamo Gymnastics	Oklahoma City, Oklahoma

Junior national team
Name	Club	Residence
Jeanette Antolin	SCATS Gymnastics	Huntington Beach, California
Vanessa Atler	Charter Oak Gymnastics	Canyon Country, California
Melinda Baimbridge	Cypress Academy	Houston, Texas
Kendall Beck	Cypress Academy	San Antonio, Texas
Alexis Brion	Gymstrada	Virginia Beach, Virginia
Karissa Chock	SCATS Gymnastics	Huntington Beach, California
Jamie Dantzscher	Charter Oak Gymnastics	Palmdale, California
Kaitlyn Dyson	Cypress Academy	Conroe, Texas
Gail Kachura	Capital Gymnastics National Training Center	Centerville, Virginia
Mina Kim	Dynamo Gymnastics	Oklahoma City, Oklahoma
Coreen Murphy	Xtreme Gymnastics	Scottsdale, Arizona
Carri Nagle	Parkettes National Gymnastics Center	Whitehall, Pennsylvania
Kelly Parkinson	Cypress Academy	Houston, Texas
Robin Phelps	Cincinnati Gymnastics Academy	Cincinnati, Ohio
Elise Ray	Hill's Gymnastics	Columbia, Maryland
Breanne Rutherford	New England Gymnastics Express	Simsbury, Connecticut
Kristen Stucky	Salto Gymnastics	Menomonee Falls, Wisconsin
Rebecca Whitehurst	Cypress Academy	Austin, Texas
Lindsay Wing	Cypress Academy	Cypress, Texas

=== 1995–96 ===
Senior national team
Name	Club	Residence
Mary Beth Arnold	Flips USA Gymnastics	Sparks, Nevada
Mohini Bhardwaj	Brown's Gymnastics	Houston, Texas
Amanda Borden	Cincinnati Gymnastics Academy	Cincinnati, Ohio
Heather Brink	Dynamo Gymnastics	Oklahoma City, Oklahoma
Amy Chow	West Valley Gymnastics School	San Jose, California
Dominique Dawes	Hill's Gymnastics	College Park, Maryland
Monica Flammer	Cypress Academy	Spring, Texas
Larissa Fontaine	Hill's Gymnastics	Silver Spring, Maryland
Deidra Graham	Olympus School of Gymnastics	Salt Lake City, Utah
Alecia Ingram	Dynamo Gymnastics	Oklahoma City, Oklahoma
Theresa Kulikowski	Colorado Aerials	Colorado Springs, Colorado
Kristen Maloney	Parkettes National Gymnastics Center	Pen Argyl, Pennsylvania
Soni Meduna	Dynamo Gymnastics	Edmond, Oklahoma
Shannon Miller	Dynamo Gymnastics	Edmond, Oklahoma
Dominique Moceanu	Karolyi Gymnastics	Houston, Texas
Jaycie Phelps	Cincinnati Gymnastics Academy	Cincinnati, Ohio
Andree Pickens	Cypress Academy	Houston, Texas
Kristy Powell	Colorado Aerials	Colorado Springs, Colorado
Elizabeth Reid	Karon's Gymnastics	Burke, Virginia
Rachel Rochelli	Brown's Gymnastics	Houston, Texas
Kerri Strug	Karolyi Gymnastics	Houston, Texas
Katie Teft	Gedderts' Twistars	Grand Rapids, Michigan
Doni Thompson	Colorado Aerials	Colorado Springs, Colorado
Jennie Thompson	Dynamo Gymnastics	Oklahoma City, Oklahoma
Raegan Tomasek	Hill's Gymnastics	Gaithersburg, Maryland

Junior national team
Name	Club	Residence
Jeanette Antolin	SCATS Gymnastics	Huntington Beach, California
Vanessa Atler	Charter Oak Gymnastics	Canyon Country, California
Melinda Baimbridge	Cypress Academy	Webster, Texas
Alexis Brion	Gymstrada	Virginia Beach, Virginia
Jamie Dantzscher	Charter Oak Gymnastics	Palmdale, California
Kaitlyn Dyson	Cypress Academy	Conroe, Texas
Gail Kachura	Capital Gymnastics National Training Center	Centerville, Virginia
Mina Kim	Dynamo Gymnastics	Oklahoma City, Oklahoma
Coreen Murphy	Xtreme Gymnastics	Scottsdale, Arizona
Carri Nagle	Parkettes National Gymnastics Center	Coplax, Pennsylvania
Robin Phelps	Cincinnati Gymnastics Academy	Cincinnati, Ohio
Kinsey Rowe	Cypress Academy	Cypress, Texas
Breanne Rutherford	New England Gymnastics Express	Simsbury, Connecticut
Kristen Stucky	Salto Gymnastics	Menomonee Falls, Wisconsin
Rebecca Whitehurst	Cypress Academy	Houston, Texas
Leondra Willis	Puget Sound Gymnastics	Tacoma, Washington

=== 1994–95 ===
Senior national team
Name	Club	Residence
Sarah Balogach	Parkettes National Gymnastics Center	Allentown, Pennsylvania
Mary Beth Arnold	Flips USA Gymnastics	Sparks, Nevada
Jenni Beathard	Brown's Gymnastics	Altamonte Springs, Florida
Mohini Bhardwaj	Brown's Gymnastics	Altamonte Springs, Florida
Amanda Borden	Cincinnati Gymnastics Academy	Cincinnati, Ohio
Wendy Bruce	Brown's Gymnastics	Altamonte Springs, Florida
Michelle Campi	Dynamo Gymnastics	Oklahoma City, Oklahoma
Amy Chow	West Valley Gymnastics School	San Jose, California
Amanda Curry	Cypress Academy	Katy, Texas
Kellee Davis	American Twisters	Margate, Florida
Dominique Dawes	Hill's Gymnastics	Silver Spring, Maryland
Larissa Fontaine	Buffalo Grove Gymnastics Center	Deerfield, Illinois
Kara Fry	Parkettes National Gymnastics Center	Nazareth, Pennsylvania
Martha Grubbs	Parkettes National Gymnastics Center	Gainesville, Florida
Ashley Kever	Capital Gymnastics National Training Center	Austin, Texas
Kristi Lichey	Cincinnati Gymnastics Academy	Cincinnati, Ohio
Kristin McDermott	Parkettes National Gymnastics Center	Whitehall, Pennsylvania
Soni Meduna	Dynamo Gymnastics	Edmond, Oklahoma
Shannon Miller	Dynamo Gymnastics	Edmond, Oklahoma
Dominique Moceanu	Karolyi Gymnastics	Houston, Texas
Samantha Muhleman	Cincinnati Gymnastics Academy	Cincinnati, Ohio
Jaycie Phelps	Cincinnati Gymnastics Academy	Fairfield, Ohio
Kristy Powell	Colorado Aerials	Colorado Springs, Colorado
Summer Reid	Flips USA Gymnastics	Sparks, Nevada
Rachel Rochelli	Cypress Academy	Houston, Texas
Kerri Strug	Gymnastics World	Tucson, Arizona
Katie Teft	Great Lakes Gymnastics	Grand Rapids, Michigan
Doni Thompson	Colorado Aerials	Colorado Springs, Colorado
Jennie Thompson	Dynamo Gymnastics	Oklahoma City, Oklahoma
Marianna Webster	Dynamo Gymnastics	Oklahoma City, Oklahoma

Junior national team
Name	Club	Residence
Vanessa Atler	Charter Oak Gymnastics	Canyon Country, California
Melinda Baimbridge	Cypress Academy	Webster, Texas
Alexis Brion	Gymstrada	Virginia Beach, Virginia
Jamie Dantzscher	Charter Oak Gymnastics	Palmdale, California
Monica Flammer	Cypress Academy	Spring, Texas
Deidra Graham	Olympus School of Gymnastics	Salt Lake City, Utah
Gail Kachura	Capital Gymnastics National Training Center	Centerville, Virginia
Mina Kim	Dynamo Gymnastics	Oklahoma City, Oklahoma
Kristen Maloney	Parkettes National Gymnastics Center	Pen Argyl, Pennsylvania
Marissa Medal	American Twisters	Pompano Beach, Florida
Andree Pickens	Cypress Academy	Houston, Texas
Kinsey Rowe	Cypress Academy	Cypress, Texas
Breanne Rutherford	New England Gymnastics Express	Simsbury, Connecticut
Kristen Stucky	Salto Gymnastics	Menomonee Falls, Wisconsin
Tara Tagliarino	American Twisters	Coral Springs, Florida
Rebecca Whitehurst	Capital Gymnastics National Training Center	Austin, Texas

=== 1993–94 ===
Senior national team
Name	Club	Residence
Kim Arnold	Desert Devils Gymnastics	Scottsdale, Arizona
Jenni Beathard	Brown's Gymnastics	Altamonte Springs, Florida
Mohini Bhardwaj	Brown's Gymnastics	Altamonte Springs, Florida
Amanda Borden	Cincinnati Gymnastics Academy	Cincinnati, Ohio
Sarah Cain	Grand Island Twisters	Grand Island, Nebraska
Michelle Campi	Pozsar's Gymnastics	Fair Oaks, California
Amy Chow	West Valley Gymnastics School	San Jose, California
Kellee Davis	American Twisters	Parkland, Florida
Dominique Dawes	Hill's Gymnastics	Silver Spring, Maryland
Wendy Ellsberry	Queen City Gymnastics Center	Cincinnati, Ohio
Katie Fitzpatrick	Queen City Gymnastics Center	Centerville, Ohio
Larissa Fontaine	American Academy of Gymnastics	Deerfield, Illinois
Kara Fry	Parkettes National Gymnastics Center	Nazareth, Pennsylvania
Lisa Gianni	North Stars Gymnastics Academy	Livingston, New Jersey
Karin Lichey	Cincinnati Gymnastics Academy	Cincinnati, Ohio
Kristin McDermott	Parkettes National Gymnastics Center	Whitehall, Pennsylvania
Soni Meduna	Dynamo Gymnastics	Edmond, Oklahoma
Shannon Miller	Dynamo Gymnastics	Edmond, Oklahoma
Samantha Muhleman	Cincinnati Gymnastics Academy	Fairfield, Ohio
Elizabeth Reid	Karon's Gymnastics	Burke, Virginia
Summer Reid	Flips USA Gymnastics	Sparks, Nevada
Rachel Rochelli	Cypress Academy	Houston, Texas
Kerri Strug	Gymnastics World	Tucson, Arizona
Jennie Thompson	Dynamo Gymnastics	Oklahoma City, Oklahoma
Marianna Webster	Dynamo Gymnastics	Oklahoma City, Oklahoma
Kimberly Young	Colorado Aerials	Colorado Springs, Colorado

Junior national team
Name	Club	Residence
Mary Beth Arnold	Flips USA Gymnastics	Sparks, Nevada
Eileen Díaz	Cypress Academy	Houston, Texas
Mina Kim	Dynamo Gymnastics	Oklahoma City, Oklahoma
Susie Kinkaid	American Twisters	Lighthouse Point, Florida
Theresa Kulikowski	Colorado Aerials	Colorado Springs, Colorado
Kristi Lichey	Cincinnati Gymnastics Academy	Cincinnati, Ohio
Tanya Maiers	Dynamo Gymnastics	Oklahoma City, Oklahoma
Kristen Maloney	Parkettes National Gymnastics Center	Pen Argyl, Pennsylvania
Jamie Martini	American Twisters	Pompano Beach, Florida
Marissa Medal	American Twisters	Pompano Beach, Florida
Dominique Moceanu	Karolyi Gymnastics	Houston, Texas
Andree Pickens	Cypress Academy	Houston, Texas
Kristy Powell	Colorado Aerials	Colorado Springs, Colorado
Katie Teft	Great Lakes Gymnastics	Grand Rapids, Michigan
Doni Thompson	Colorado Aerials	Colorado Springs, Colorado

=== 1992–93 ===
Senior national team
Name	Club	Residence
Kim Arnold	Desert Devils Gymnastics	Scottsdale, Arizona
Sarah Balogach	Parkettes National Gymnastics Center	Allentown, Pennsylvania
Juliet Bangerter	Desert Devils Gymnastics	Tempe, Arizona
Mohini Bhardwaj	Brown's Gymnastics	Altamonte Springs, Florida
Amanda Borden	Cincinnati Gymnastics Academy	Cincinnati, Ohio
Heather Brink	Dynamo Gymnastics	Lincoln, Nebraska
Wendy Bruce	Brown's Gymnastics	Altamonte Springs, Florida
Michelle Campi	Pozsar's Gymnastics	Carmichael, California
Elisabeth Crandall	Desert Devils Gymnastics	West Sacramento, California
Dominique Dawes	Hill's Gymnastics	Silver Spring, Maryland
Shelley Engel	SCATS Gymnastics	Huntington Beach, California
Amber Erdos	Desert Devils Gymnastics	Phoenix, Arizona
Denise Fierro	Charter Oaks Gymnastics	Covina, California
Larissa Fontaine	American Academy of Gymnastics	Deerfield, Illinois
Lisa Gianni	North Stars Gymnastics Academy	Livingston, New Jersey
Hilary Grivich	Karolyi Gymnastics	Huntsville, Texas
Martha Grubbs	Parkettes National Gymnastics Center	Bethlehem, Pennsylvania
Heidi Hornbeek	Arizona Sunrays	Glendale, Arizona
Kim Kelly	Parkettes National Gymnastics Center	Whitehall, Pennsylvania
Ashley Kever	Capital Gymnastics	Austin, Texas
Karin Lichey	Cincinnati Gymnastics Academy	Cincinnati, Ohio
Kristin McDermott	Parkettes National Gymnastics Center	Coplay, Pennsylvania
Jennifer McKenna	Arizona State University	Tempe, Arizona
Jennifer Mercier	Parkettes National Gymnastics Center	Catasauqua, Pennsylvania
Shannon Miller	Dynamo Gymnastics	Edmond, Oklahoma
Misty Moore	Capital Gymnastics	Austin, Texas
Betty Okino	Karolyi Gymnastics	Houston, Texas
Summer Reid	Flips USA Gymnastics	Sparks, Nevada
Monica Shaw	Rocky Mountain Gymnastics	Murray, Utah
Molly Shawen	Brown's Gymnastics	Altamonte Springs, Florida
Traci Sommer	North Stars Gymnastics Academy	Chatham, New Jersey
Kerri Strug	Dynamo Gymnastics	Oklahoma City, Oklahoma
Jessica Washburn	American Twisters	Coral Springs, Florida
Marianna Webster	Dynamo Gymnastics	Oklahoma City, Oklahoma
Stephanie Woods	Capital Gymnastics	Pflugerville, Texas
Anne Woynerowski	North Stars Gymnastics Academy	Mountain Lakes, New Jersey
Kim Zmeskal	Karolyi Gymnastics	Houston, Texas

Junior national team
Name	Club	Residence
Lanna Apisukh	Brown's Gymnastics	Lake Mary, Florida
Sarah Cain	Grand Island Twisters	Grand Island, Nebraska
Amy Chow	West Valley Gymnastics School	San Jose, California
Eileen Díaz	Cypress Academy	Hurst, Texas
Monica Flammer	Karolyi Gymnastics	Spring, Texas
Laura French	Cypress Academy	Houston, Texas
Melissa Green	Great Lakes Gymnastics	East Lansing, Michigan
Erin Johnson	Desert Devils Gymnastics	Chandler, Arizona
Bridget Knaeble	Twin City Twisters	New Hope, Minnesota
Tanya Maiers	Dynamo Gymnastics	Oklahoma City, Oklahoma
Jamie Martini	Cypress Academy	Houston, Texas
Dominique Moceanu	Karolyi Gymnastics	Houston, Texas
Leila Pallardy	LaFleur's Gymnastics	Tampa, Florida
Kristy Powell	Cypress Academy	Spring, Texas
Rachel Rochelli	Cypress Academy	Houston, Texas
Amy Shelton	American Gymnastics Center	Gilbert, Arizona
Emily Spychala	LaFleur's Gymnastics	Odessa, Florida
Doni Thompson	Colorado Aerials	Colorado Springs, Colorado
Jennie Thompson	Karolyi Gymnastics	Houston, Texas

=== 1991–92 ===
Senior national team
Name	Club	Residence
Hillary Anderson	New England Gymnastics Express	West Granby, Connecticut
Juliet Bangerter	Desert Devils Gymnastics	Tempe, Arizona
Wendy Bruce	Brown's Gymnastics	Altamonte Springs, Florida
Michelle Campi	Pozsar's Gymnastics	Carmichael, California
Elisabeth Crandall	Desert Devils Gymnastics	Tempe, Arizona
Dominique Dawes	Hill's Gymnastics	Silver Spring, Maryland
Shelley Engel	SCATS Gymnastics	Huntington Beach, California
Larissa Fontaine	Aerials Gymnastics	Deerfield, Illinois
Hilary Grivich	Karolyi Gymnastics	Huntsville, Texas
Kim Kelly	Parkettes National Gymnastics Center	Whitehall, Pennsylvania
Jennifer Mercier	Parkettes National Training Center	Catasauqua, Pennsylvania
Suzanne Metz	American Twisters	Margate, Florida
Shannon Miller	Dynamo Gymnastics	Edmond, Oklahoma
Marna Neubauer	Great American Gymnastics Express	Blue Springs, Missouri
Betty Okino	Karolyi Gymnastics	Houston, Texas
Molly Shawen	Queen City Gymnastics Center	Edgewood, Kentucky
Chelle Stack	Cypress Academy	Houston, Texas
Erica Stokes	Dynamo Gymnastics	Oklahoma City, Oklahoma
Kerri Strug	Karolyi Gymnastics	Houston, Texas
Stephanie Woods	Capital Gymnastics	Austin, Texas
Sandy Woolsey	Desert Devils Gymnastics	Tempe, Arizona
Kim Zmeskal	Karolyi Gymnastics	Houston, Texas

Junior national team
Name	Club	Residence
Lanna Apisukh	Brown's Gymnastics	Lake Mary, Florida
Sarah Balogach	Parkettes National Gymnastics Center	Allentown, Pennsylvania
Keila Butler	Hodgini Gymnastics	Jasper, Indiana
Amy Chow	West Valley Gymnastics School	San Jose, California
Kristin Duff	Karon's Gymnastics	Fairfax Station, Virginia
Heidi Hornbeek	Arizona Sunrays	Glendale, Arizona
Cara Lepper	CATS Gymnastics	Southington, Connecticut
Karin Lichey	Cincinnati Gymnastics Academy	Cincinnati, Ohio
Kristin McDermott	Parkettes National Gymnastics Center	Coplay, Pennsylvania
Summer Reid	Flips USA Gymnastics	Sparks, Nevada
Tiffany Simpson	Desert Devils Gymnastics	Tempe, Arizona
Gwen Spidle	Great American Gymnastics Express	Independence, Missouri
Laura Szczepanski	Great Lakes Gymnastics	Lansing, Michigan
Anne Woynerowski	North Stars Gymnastics Academy	Mountain Lakes, New Jersey

=== 1990–91 ===
Senior national team
Name	Club	Residence
Juliet Bangerter	Desert Devils Gymnastics	Tempe, Arizona
Elisabeth Crandall	Desert Devils Gymnastics	Tempe, Arizona
Fuller Frenz	SCATS Gymnastics	Huntington Beach, California
Christy Henrich	Great American Gymnastics Express	Independence, Missouri
Brandy Johnson	Brown's Gymnastics	Apopka, Florida
Kim Kelly	Parkettes National Gymnastics Center	Whitehall, Pennsylvania
Chari Knight	Oregon State University	Eugene, Oregon
Danna Lister	Gym Country USA	Tulsa, Oklahoma
Jennifer Mercier	Parkettes National Gymnastics Center	Catasauqua, Pennsylvania
Shannon Miller	Dynamo Gymnastics	Edmond, Oklahoma
Marna Neubauer	Great American Gymnastics Express	Blue Springs, Missouri
Betty Okino	Karolyi Gymnastics	Houston, Texas
Amy Scherr	Karolyi Gymnastics	Spring, Texas
Agina Simpkins	Illinois Gymnastics Institute	Bolingbrook, Illinois
Chelle Stack	Karolyi Gymnastics	Houston, Texas
Erica Stokes	Karolyi Gymnastics	Houston, Texas
Christine Tonry	Parkettes National Gymnastics Center	Morganville, New Jersey
Stephanie Woods	Capital Gymnastics	Austin, Texas
Sandy Woolsey	Desert Devils Gymnastics	Tempe, Arizona
Kim Zmeskal	Karolyi Gymnastics	Houston, Texas

Junior national team
Name	Club	Residence
Sarah Balogach	Parkettes National Gymnastics Center	Allentown, Pennsylvania
Dominique Dawes	Hill's Gymnastics	Silver Spring, Maryland
Kristin Duff	Karon's Gymnastics	Fairfax Station, Virginia
Denise Fierro	Charter Oaks Gymnastics	Covina, California
Larissa Fontaine	American Academy of Gymnastics	Deerfield, Illinois
Hilary Grivich	Karolyi Gymnastics	Huntsville, Texas
Heidi Hornbeek	Arizona Sunrays	Glendale, Arizona
Kristin McDermott	Parkettes National Gymnastics Center	Whitehall, Pennsylvania
Summer Reid	Flips USA Gymnastics	Sparks, Nevada
Molly Shawen	Brown's Gymnastics	Altamonte Springs, Florida
Kerri Strug	JG Gymnastics	Tucson, Arizona
Anne Woynerowski	North Stars Gymnastics Academy	Mountain Lakes, New Jersey

== 1980s ==
=== 1989–90 ===
Senior national team
Name	Club	Residence
Juliet Bangerter	Desert Devils Gymnastics	Tempe, Arizona
Wendy Bruce	Brown's Gymnastics	Longwood, Florida
Tracey Cole	Spirit of America	Norman, Oklahoma
Diane Cushenberry	Gymnastics Country USA	Tulsa, Oklahoma
Anne Dixon	Karolyi Gymnastics	Houston, Texas
Sheryl Dundas	Capital Gymnastics	Austin, Texas
Jenny Ester	Gymnastics Country USA	Tulsa, Oklahoma
Christy Henrich	Great American Gymnastics Express	Independence, Missouri
Brandy Johnson	Brown's Gymnastics	Apopka, Florida
Kim Kelly	Parkettes National Gymnastics Center	Whitehall, Pennsylvania
Kristen Kenoyer	University of Utah	Salt Lake City, Utah
Chari Knight	American Gymnastics Training Center	Eugene, Oregon
May May Leung	North Stars Gymnastics Academy	Parsippany, New Jersey
Jennifer McKenna	Parkettes National Gymnastics Center	
Jennifer Mercier	Parkettes National Gymnastics Center	Catasauqua, Pennsylvania
Marna Neubauer	Great American Gymnastics Express	Blue Springs, Missouri
Lisa Panzironi	Brown's Gymnastics	Longwood, Florida
Robin Richter	Nebraska School of Gymnastics	Lincoln, Nebraska
Agina Simpkins	Illinois Gymnastics Institute	Bolingbrook, Illinois
Chelle Stack	SCATS Gymnastics	Houston, Texas
Stephanie Woods	Capital Gymnastics	Austin, Texas
Sandy Woolsey	Desert Devils Gymnastics	Tempe, Arizona

Junior national team
Name	Club	Residence
Dominique Dawes	Hill's Gymnastics	Silver Spring, Maryland
Denise Fierro	Charter Oaks Gymnastics	Covina, California
Hilary Grivich	Karolyi Gymnastics	Huntsville, Texas
Gina Jackson	Dynamo Gymnastics	Oklahoma City, Oklahoma
Jennifer Jones	Gym Country USA	Tulsa, Oklahoma
Heidi Kaye	Parkettes National Gymnastics Center	Delran, New Jersey
Jana McQuown	Parkettes National Gymnastics Center	Coopersburg, Pennsylvania
Shannon Miller	Dynamo Gymnastics	Edmond, Oklahoma
Kelly Pitzen	Brown's Gymnastics	
Jana Reardon	Parkettes National Gymnastics Center	Bethlehem, Pennsylvania
Amy Scherr	Karolyi Gymnastics	Spring, Texas
Erica Stokes	Karolyi Gymnastics	Houston, Texas
Amanda Uherek	Karolyi Gymnastics	Houston, Texas
Elizabeth Walker		Oklahoma City, Oklahoma
Danielle Wood	Karolyi Gymnastics	Houston, Texas
Kim Zmeskal	Karolyi Gymnastics	Houston, Texas

=== 1988–89 ===
Senior national team
Name	Club	Residence
Wendy Bruce	Brown's Gymnastics	North Lauderdale, Florida
Tracey Calore	Parkettes National Gymnastics Center	Orefield, Pennsylvania
Sheryl Dundas	Capital Gymnastics	Austin, Texas
Rhonda Faehn	Karolyi's Gymnastics	Coon Rapids, Minnesota
Kelly Garrison	University of Oklahoma	Norman, Oklahoma
Stacey Gunthorpe	SCATS Gymnastics	Freehold, New Jersey
Jennifer Hagberg	Olympic Gymnastics Academy	Brooklyn Park, Minnesota
Christy Henrich	Great American Gymnastics Express	Independence, Missouri
Brandy Johnson	Brown's Gymnastics	Altamonte Springs, Florida
Kim Kelly	Parkettes National Gymnastics Center	King of Prussia, Pennsylvania
Kristen Kenoyer	Parkettes National Gymnastics Center	Allentown, Pennsylvania
Danna Lister	Gymnastics Country USA	Tulsa, Oklahoma
Missy Marlowe	Rocky Mountain Gymnastics	Salt Lake City, Utah
Phoebe Mills	Karolyi Gymnastics	Houston, Texas
Lisa Panzironi	Parkettes National Gymnastics Center	Wescosville, Pennsylvania
Kristie Phillips	SCATS Gymnastics	Houston, Texas
Robin Richter	Nebraska School of Gymnastics	Lincoln, Nebraska
Tina Snowden	Karolyi Gymnastics	Houston, Texas
Hope Spivey	Parkettes National Gymnastics Center	Allentown, Pennsylvania
Chelle Stack	Karolyi Gymnastics	Houston, Texas
Carol Ulrich	Apex All Stars	Broomfield, Colorado
Joyce Wilborn	Parkettes National Gymnastics Center	Paterson, New Jersey
Sandy Woolsey	Desert Devils Gymnastics	Tempe, Arizona
Doe Yamashiro	SCATS Gymnastics	Gardena, California
Nicole Young	Great American Gymnastics Express	Lee's Summit, Missouri

Junior national team
Name	Club	Residence
Juliet Bangerter	Desert Devils Gymnastics	Tempe, Arizona
Elisabeth Crandall	Desert Devils Gymnastics	Tempe, Arizona
Jenny Ester	Gymnastics Country USA	Tulsa, Oklahoma
Nicole Fajardo	KIPS Gymnastics	Long Beach, California
Jennifer McKernan	Eastern National Academy	Middletown, New York
Marna Neubauer	Great American Gymnastics Express	Blue Springs, Missouri
Kelly Pitzen	Karolyi Gymnastics	Houston, Texas
Amy Scherr	Karolyi Gymnastics	Houston, Texas
Erica Stokes	Karolyi Gymnastics	Houston, Texas
Karen Tierney	Desert Devils Gymnastics	Scottsdale, Arizona
Margaret Ulett	Great American Gymnastics Express	Lee's Summit, Missouri
Stephanie Woods	Capital Gymnastics	Austin, Texas
Kim Zmeskal	Karolyi Gymnastics	Houston, Texas

=== 1987–88 ===
Senior national team
Name	Club	Residence
Tracey Calore	Parkettes National Gymnastics Center	Orefield, Pennsylvania
Robin Carter	SCATS Gymnastics	
Dana Dobransky	Bloomfield Gymnastics	Sterling Heights, Michigan
Michelle Dusserre	SCATS Gymnastics	Garden Grove, California
Rhonda Faehn	Karolyi Gymnastics	Houston, Texas
Tricia Fortson	Karolyi Gymnastics	Houston, Texas
Kelly Garrison	University of Oklahoma	Norman, Oklahoma
Julissa Gomez	US Acrosport	Houston, Texas
Stacey Gunthorpe	SCATS Gymnastics	Huntington Beach, California
Christy Henrich	Great American Gymnastics Express	Independence, Missouri
Katherine Kelleher	Queen City Gymnastics Center	Cincinnati, Ohio
Sunja Knapp	Berks Gymnastics Academy	Wyomissing, Pennsylvania
Sabrina Mar	SCATS Gymnastics	Monterey Park, California
Missy Marlowe	Rocky Mountain Gymnastics	Salt Lake City, Utah
Kim Masters	Great American Gymnastics Express	Blue Springs, Missouri
Phoebe Mills	Karolyi Gymnastics	Houston, Texas
Lisa Panzironi	Parkettes National Gymnastics Center	Orefield, Pennsylvania
Kristie Phillips	SCATS Gymnastics	Houston, Texas
Robin Richter	Nebraska Gold Gymnastics	Lincoln, Nebraska
Tanya Service	National Academy of Artistic Gymnastics	Eugene, Oregon
Jennifer Sey	Will-Moor School of Gymnastics	Allentown, Pennsylvania
Hope Spivey	Parkettes National Gymnastics Center	Allentown, Pennsylvania
Joyce Wilborn	Parkettes National Gymnastics Center	Paterson, New Jersey
Doe Yamashiro	SCATS Gymnastics	Huntington Beach, California

Junior national team
Name	Club	Residence
Juliet Bangerter	Desert Devils Gymnastics	Tempe, Arizona
Elisabeth Crandall	Desert Devils Gymnastics	Tempe, Arizona
Nicole Fajardo	KIPS Gymnastics	Long Beach, California
Laurie Hallmark	Karolyi Gymnastics	
Brandy Johnson	Brown's Gymnastics	Altamonte Springs, Florida
Kim Kelly	Parkettes National Gymnastics Center	King of Prussia, Pennsylvania
Michaelene Myers	Puget Sound Gymnastics	Puyallup, Washington
Misty Rosas	SCATS Gymnastics	Huntington Beach, California
Tina Snowden	Karolyi Gymnastics	Houston, Texas
Chelle Stack	Karolyi Gymnastics	Houston, Texas
Tasha Stafford	Karolyi Gymnastics	Houston, Texas
Karen Tierney	Great American Gymnastics Express	Blue Springs, Missouri
Missy Wells	Gymnastics West	Milwaukie, Oregon
Suanna Wells	Great American Gymnastics Express	Blue Springs, Missouri

=== 1986–87 ===
Senior national team
Name	Club	Residence
Tracy Butler	Buckeye Gymnastics	Worthington, Ohio
Tracey Calore	Parkettes National Gymnastics Center	Orefield, Pennsylvania
Angie Denkins	Will-Moor School of Gymnastics	Willingboro, New Jersey
Rhonda Faehn	Karolyi Gymnastics	Houston, Texas
Kelly Garrison	University of Oklahoma	Norman, Oklahoma
Debbie Gondek	Parkettes National Gymnastics Center	Philadelphia, Pennsylvania
Beth Hansen	Crowley's Gymnastics Center	Somerset, Wisconsin
Katherine Kelleher	Queen City Gymnastics Center	Cincinnati, Ohio
Lisa Lazar	Parkettes National Gymnastics Center	Easton, Pennsylvania
Sabrina Mar	SCATS Gymnastics	Monterey Park, California
Dina Margolin	Parkettes National Gymnastics Center	Hazlet, New Jersey
Missy Marlowe	Rocky Mountain Gymnastics	Salt Lake City, Utah
Nadya Mason	MarVaTeens Gymnastics	Washington, D.C.
Kim Masters	Great American Gymnastics Express	Blue Springs, Missouri
Yolande Mavity	National Academy of Artistic Gymnastics	Eugene, Oregon
Robin Richter	Nebraska School of Gymnastics	Lincoln, Nebraska
Marie Roethlisberger	SCATS Gymnastics	Huntington Beach, California
Jennifer Sey	Parkettes National Gymnastics Center	Allentown, Pennsylvania
Alyssa Solomon	Parkettes National Gymnastics Center	Allentown, Pennsylvania
Hope Spivey	Parkettes National Gymnastics Center	Allentown, Pennsylvania
Cindy Tom	Verdugo Gymnastics Club	West Covina, California
Joyce Wilborn	North Stars Gymnastics Academy	Paterson, New Jersey
Corrinne Wright	Gym-Cats	Mount Vernon, New York
Doe Yamashiro	SCATS Gymnastics	Huntington Beach, California

Junior national team
Name	Club	Residence
Kelly Baker	Puget Sound Gymnastics	Auburn, Washington
Robin Carter	Go Gymnastics International	Spring, Texas
Sheryl Dundas	Capital Gymnastics	Austin, Texas
Julissa Gomez	Karolyi Gymnastics	Houston, Texas
Christy Henrich	Great American Gymnastics Express	Independence, Missouri
Sunja Knapp	Berks Gymnastics Academy	Wyomissing, Pennsylvania
Phoebe Mills	Karolyi Gymnastics	Houston, Texas
Lisa Panzironi	Parkettes National Gymnastics Center	Allentown, Pennsylvania
Kristie Phillips	Karolyi Gymnastics	Houston, Texas

=== 1985–86 ===
Senior national team
Name	Club	Residence
Pam Bileck	SCATS Gymnastics	Huntington Beach, California
Tracy Butler	Parkettes National Gymnastics Center	Allentown, Pennsylvania
Tracey Calore	Parkettes National Gymnastics Center	Orefield, Pennsylvania
Heather Carter	SCATS Gymnastics	Huntington Beach, California
Angie Denkins	Will-Moor Gymnastics	Willingboro, New Jersey
Jennifer Ferreira	SCATS Gymnastics	Long Beach, California
Kelly Garrison	University of Oklahoma	Norman, Oklahoma
Jennifer Greenhut	Parkettes National Gymnastics Center	Allentown, Pennsylvania
Stacey Gunthorpe	Karolyi Gymnastics	Houston, Texas
Kim Hamilton	Richmond Olympiad	Richmond, Virginia
Kim Hurley	Karolyi Gymnastics	Spring, Texas
Sabrina Mar	SCATS Gymnastics	Monterey Park, California
Yolande Mavity	National Academy of Artistic Gymnastics	Eugene, Oregon
Patti Massoels	Illinois Gymnastics Institute	Whiting, Indiana
Marie Roethlisberger	SCATS Gymnastics	Huntington Beach, California
Gina Satterly	SCATS Gymnastics	Ontario, California
Jennifer Sey	Parkettes National Gymnastics Center	Allentown, Pennsylvania
Denise Villars	Karolyi Gymnastics	Houston, Texas
Joyce Wilborn	New Jersey School of Gymnastics	Fairfield, New Jersey
Lee Wisnewski	Karolyi Gymnastics	Houston, Texas
Lisa Wittwer	Olympic Gymnastics Academy	Eagan, Minnesota
Corrinne Wright	Gym-Cats	Mount Vernon, New York

Junior national team
Name	Club	Residence
Jennifer Barton	SCATS Gymnastics	Huntington Beach, California
Rhonda Faehn	Karolyi Gymnastics	Houston, Texas
Dee Dee Foster	SCATS Gymnastics	Huntington Beach, California
Jennifer Hagberg	Olympic Gymnastics Academy	Brooklyn Park, Minnesota
Kristine Johnson	SCATS Gymnastics	Pasadena, California
Missy Marlowe	Rocky Mountain Gymnastics	Salt Lake City, Utah
Alyssa Solomon	Parkettes National Gymnastics Center	Allentown, Pennsylvania
Hope Spivey	Parkettes National Gymnastics Center	Allentown, Pennsylvania

=== 1984–85 ===
Senior national team
Name	Club	Residence
Pam Bileck	SCATS Gymnastics	Garden Grove, California
Tracy Butler	Parkettes National Gymnastics Center	Allentown, Pennsylvania
Heather Carter	Texas Academy of Gymnastics	Fort Worth, Texas
Dianne Durham	Karolyi Gymnastics	Houston, Texas
Michelle Dusserre	SCATS Gymnastics	Garden Grove, California
Tami Elliott	California State Fullerton	Fullerton, California
Kelly Garrison	University of Oklahoma	Norman, Oklahoma
Michelle Goodwin	Berks Gymnastics Academy	Wyomissing, Pennsylvania
Kim Hamilton	Richmond Olympiad	Richmond, Virginia
Kerry Haynie	Karolyi Gymnastics	Spring, Texas
Michelle Hilse	Texas Academy of Gymnastics	Bedford, Texas
Kathy Johnson	SCATS Gymnastics	Huntington Beach, California
Yolande Mavity	National Academy of Artistic Gymnastics	Eugene, Oregon
Julianne McNamara	Karolyi Gymnastics	Houston, Texas
Lisa McVay	MarVaTeens Gymnastics	Waldorf, Maryland
Yumi Mordre	Puget Sound School of Gymnastics	Vashon Island, Washington
Mary Lou Retton	Karolyi Gymnastics	Houston, Texas
Marie Roethlisberger	SCATS Gymnastics	Huntington Beach, California
Tanya Service	National Academy of Artistic Gymnastics	Eugene, Oregon
JoJo Sims	Texas Academy of Gymnastics	Fort Worth, Texas
Tammy Smith	Parkettes National Gymnastics Center	Allentown, Pennsylvania
Tracee Talavera	Golden Gate Gymnastics	Walnut Creek, California
Lucy Wener	SCATS Gymnastics	Huntington Beach, California
Dawna Wilson	National Academy of Artistic Gymnastics	Eugene, Oregon
Lisa Wittwer	Texas Academy of Gymnastics	Fort Worth, Texas

Junior national team
Name	Club	Residence
Heidi Brady	Acronauts School of Gymnastics	Birmingham, Michigan
Tracey Calore	Parkettes National Gymnastics Center	Orefield, Pennsylvania
Karen Dalton	Almaden Valley Gymnastics	Saratoga, California
Dee Dee Foster	SCATS Gymnastics	Tuscaloosa, Alabama
Becky Johnson	Olympic Gymnastics Academy	Edina, Minnesota
Lisa Lazar	Parkettes National Gymnastics Center	Easton, Pennsylvania
Sabrina Mar	SCATS Gymnastics	Huntington Beach, California
Missy Marlowe	Rocky Mountain Gymnastics	Salt Lake City, Utah
Phoebe Mills	Karolyi Gymnastics	Houston, Texas
Kristie Phillips	Karolyi Gymnastics	Houston, Texas
Natalie Reske	Karolyi Gymnastics	Houston, Texas
Susie Silverman	MarVaTeens Gymnastics	Rockville, Maryland

=== 1983–84 ===
Senior national team
Name	Club	Residence
Pam Bileck	Twisters Gymnastics	San Jose, California
Kathy Budesky	SCATS Gymnastics	Huntington Beach, California
Dianne Durham	Karolyi Gymnastics	Houston, Texas
Michelle Dusserre	SCATS Gymnastics	Garden Grove, California
Tami Elliott	Richmond Olympiad	Richmond, Virginia
Kelly Garrison	Oklahoma City Gymnastics Center	Oklahoma City, Oklahoma
Michelle Goodwin	Berks Gymnastics Academy	Wyomissing, Pennsylvania
Kim Hillner	Berks Gymnastics Academy	Warren, Pennsylvania
Kathy Johnson	SCATS Gymnastics	Huntington Beach, California
Yolande Mavity	National Academy of Artistic Gymnastics	Eugene, Oregon
Julianne McNamara	SCATS Gymnastics	Huntington Beach, California
Diane Monty	Denver School of Gymnastics	Denver, Colorado
Yumi Mordre	Puget Sound School of Gymnastics	Vashon Island, Washington
Becky Rashoff	Diablo Gymnastics School	San Ramon, California
Mary Lou Retton	Karolyi Gymnastics	Houston, Texas
Marie Roethlisberger	SCATS Gymnastics	Huntington Beach, California
Sandy Sobotka	Mid-America Twisters	Northbrook, Illinois
Gina Stallone	Parkettes National Gymnastics Center	Wyomissing, Pennsylvania
Tracee Talavera	Golden Gate Gymnastics	Walnut Creek, California
Trina Tinti	SCATS Gymnastics	Davis, California
Lucy Wener	SCATS Gymnastics	Huntington Beach, California
Lisa Wittwer	Texas Academy of Gymnastics	Fort Worth, Texas

Junior national team
Name	Club	Residence
Amy Appler	Berks Gymnastics Academy	West Reading, Pennsylvania
Tracy Butler	Parkettes National Gymnastics Center	Allentown, Pennsylvania
Tracey Calore	Parkettes National Gymnastics Center	Orefield, Pennsylvania
Randi Campagna	SCATS Gymnastics	Huntington Beach, California
Angie Denkins	Will-Moor Gymnastics	Willingboro, New Jersey
Fatima Carrasco	Parkettes National Gymnastics Center	New Providence, New Jersey
Traci Hinkle	Parkettes National Gymnastics Center	Allentown, Pennsylvania
Cheryl Kaneshiro	MarVaTeens Gymnastics	Rockville, Maryland
Sabrina Mar	SCATS Gymnastics	Huntington Beach, California
Missy Marlowe	Rocky Mountain Gymnastics	Salt Lake City, Utah
Vikki Miller	Twisters Gymnastics	Los Altos, California
Heather Pierce	Pacific Northwest Gymnastics	
Caitlin Quinby	Flips USA Gymnastics	Reno, Nevada
Eileen Rocchio	Gymnastics Academy of Boston	Boston, Massachusetts
Cindy Rosenberry	Parkettes National Gymnastics Center	Allentown, Pennsylvania
Jennifer Sey	Will-Moor Gymnastics	Cherry Hill, New Jersey
JoJo Sims	Karolyi Gymnastics	Houston, Texas
Paige Spiller	Karolyi Gymnastics	Houston, Texas
Nicole Trewitt	Mid-America Twisters	
Julie Whitman	SCATS Gymnastics	
Joyce Wilborn	North Stars Gymnastics Academy	Paterson, New Jersey

=== 1982–83 ===
Senior national team
Name	Club	Residence
Maisie Chillano	Parkettes National Gymnastics Center	Norristown, Pennsylvania
Luci Collins	SCATS Gymnastics	Los Angeles, California
Kelly Garrison	Oklahoma City Gymnastics Center	Oklahoma City, Oklahoma
Michelle Goodwin	Berks Gymnastics Academy	Wyomissing, Pennsylvania
Kim Hillner	Berks Gymnastics Academy	Warren, Pennsylvania
Kathy Johnson	Atlanta School of Gymnastics	Atlanta, Georgia
Amy Koopman	Mid-America Twisters	
Lynne Lederer	Mid-America Twisters	
Shari Mann	MG Gymnastics	Potomac, Maryland
Julianne McNamara	National Academy of Artistic Gymnastics	Eugene, Oregon
Lisa McVay	MarVaTeens Gymnastics	Waldorf, Maryland
Kris Montera	SCATS Gymnastics	
Yumi Mordre	National Academy of Artistic Gymnastics	Eugene, Oregon
Barrie Muzbeck	Acronauts School of Gymnastics	Bloomfield, Michigan
Marie Roethlisberger	Mid-America Twisters	
Tanya Service	National Academy of Artistic Gymnastics	Eugene, Oregon
Tammy Smith	Parkettes National Gymnastics Center	Allentown, Pennsylvania
Gina Stallone	Parkettes National Gymnastics Center	Wyomissing, Pennsylvania
Tracee Talavera	National Academy of Artistic Gymnastics	Eugene, Oregon
Lisa Zeis	Niagara Frontier Gymnastics Academy	Cheektowaga, New York

Junior national team
Name	Club	Residence
Amy Appler	Berks Gymnastics Academy	West Reading, Pennsylvania
Pam Bileck	Twisters Gymnastics	San Jose, California
Julian Brumbaugh	National Academy of Artistic Gymnastics	Eugene, Oregon
Randi Campagna	SCATS Gymnastics	Huntington Beach, California
Cindy Cole	National Academy of Artistic Gymnastics	Eugene, Oregon
Angela Darquisto	National Academy of Artistic Gymnastics	Eugene, Oregon
Angie Denkins	Will-Moor Gymnastics	Willingboro, New Jersey
Dianne Durham	Sundance Athletic Club	Houston, Texas
Michelle Dusserre	SCATS Gymnastics	Garden Grove, California
Traci Hinkle	Omaha TNT Gymnastics	Omaha, Nebraska
Cheryl Holt	National Academy of Artistic Gymnastics	Eugene, Oregon
Maya Kato	SCATS Gymnastics	Huntington Beach, California
Nicole Kushner	Parkettes National Gymnastics Center	North Whitehall, Pennsylvania
Lisa Patti	Parkettes National Gymnastics Center	Allentown, Pennsylvania
Tiffany Quincy	National Academy of Artistic Gymnastics	Eugene, Oregon
Mary Lou Retton	Karolyi Gymnastics	Houston, Texas
Cindy Rosenberry	Parkettes National Gymnastics Center	Allentown, Pennsylvania
Jennifer Sey	Will-Moor Gymnastics	Cherry Hill, New Jersey
Dawna Wilson	National Academy of Artistic Gymnastics	Eugene, Oregon
Gigi Zosa	SCATS Gymnastics	Huntington Beach, California
