= Emily Gaskins =

American artistic gymnast

- Full name: Emily Paige Gaskins
- Born: May 23, 2000 (age 26) Boca Raton, Florida USA

Gymnastics career
- Discipline: Women's artistic gymnastics
- Country represented: United States (2013–15 (USA))
- College team: Alabama Crimson Tide (2019 - 2022)
- Club: Palm Beach Gymnastics (2015 - 2017); Cincinnati Gymnastics Academy (2012 - 2015, 2017 - Present)
- Head coaches: Mary Lee Tracy (2012 - 2015, 2017 - Present)
- Former coaches: Lavinia Agache (2015); Steve Nunno (2015 - 2017)
- Choreographer: Dominic Zito
Medal record
Representing United States
US Classic
Bronze medal – third place	2017 Chicago	Floor Exercise

Emily Paige Gaskins (born May 23, 2000) is an American artistic gymnast. An elite gymnast since 2013, Gaskins was a member of the U.S. Junior National team for three years until 2016. She also made the Senior National Team in 2016.

== Biography and career ==
Gaskins was born on May 23, 2000, in Coral Springs, Florida, to parents Ronald and Kim Gaskins (née Birskovich). She has two elder sisters.

She graduated from high school in 2018, and subsequently began attending the University of Alabama.

=== 2013–2015: Junior career ===
==== 2013 ====
In fall 2012, Gaskins moved to Ohio in order to train at the Cincinnati Gymnastics Academy, under the tutelage of Mary Lee Tracy. Throughout the 2013 season, Gaskins competed as a Level 10, qualifying to the Nastia Liukin Cup – she tied for 19th place with Emily Schild. Later, she finished second in the all-around at the Ohio State Championships and second at the Region 5 Championships. Earning a bid to the 2013 J.O. National Championships, Gaskins finished second in the all-around (only 0.025 away from the title), and tied for second on the uneven bars with Marissa Oakley and Grace Waguespack.

Following her qualification to the elite level, she was fourth in the all-around in the second session of the American Classic, at the Karolyi Ranch. At the 2013 U.S. Classic, Gaskins finished ninth in the all-around and, consequently, earned a bid to Nationals. At Nationals, Gaskins placed tenth in the all-around. As a result, she made the U.S. National Team. In November, she competed at the Mexican Open with the U.S. team, winning the team title.

==== 2014–2015 ====
In 2014, Gaskins finished twelfth in the all-around at the 2014 U.S. Classic. Later, at Nationals, she found herself in sixth in the all-around competition, inducted to the National team again. On October 11, 2014, Gaskins committed to the University of Florida and the Gators program for the 2018–19 season.

She finished seventeenth in the all-around at the 2015 U.S. Classic. However, at Nationals, she placed twelfth, but didn't make the National Team again. On December 29, 2015, it was revealed that Gaskins would change her commitment from Florida to the University of Alabama and the Crimson Tide program.

=== 2016–present: Senior career ===
==== 2016 ====
In March 2016, Gaskins was added to the national team and made her senior debut at the 2016 City of Jesolo Trophy competition; she finished fourteenth in the all-around. In June 2016 she placed seventh in the all-around at the Secret U.S. Classic, and twentieth in the all around at the P&G Championships.

==== 2017 ====
Gaskins returned to training at Cincinnati Gymnastics in early 2017. In July 2017 Gaskins placed third on floor exercise and tied for sixth place in the all-around at the U.S. Classic. In August 2017 she placed seventh in the all-around and tied for fourth place on floor exercise at the U.S. National Championships.

Gaskins was one of nine gymnasts invited to compete for the 2017 worlds team. After two days of trials, she was not named to the team’s roster.
