= Amanda Jetter =

American artistic gymnast

- Full name: Amanda Rose Jetter
- Nickname: Jett
- Born: November 6, 1994 (age 31) Cincinnati, Ohio

Gymnastics career
- Discipline: Women's artistic gymnastics
- Country represented: United States; (2008–2012)
- College team: Alabama Crimson Tide
- Club: CGA
- Head coach: Dana Duckworth
- Former coach: Mary Lee Tracy
- Choreographer: Dominic Zito
- Retired: April 15, 2017

Amanda Rose Jetter (born November 6, 1994) is a former American artistic gymnast. She competed in the NCAA for the University of Alabama's gymnastics team.

== Early life and education ==
Amanda Rose Jetter was born on November 6, 1994, in Cincinnati, Ohio to parents Gerald and Denise Jetter. She has one older brother, Derek; not to be confused with New York Yankees shortstop Derek Jeter.

Jetter first started gymnastics in 1998; at the age of four, after she walked on four inch wide logs in her back garden. She enrolled in classes at Cincinnati Gymnastics Academy in Fairfield, Ohio and remained at the club throughout her entire club career. Six years after starting gymnastics training, at the age of nine, Amanda competed as a level eight gymnast; finishing third on balance beam at Regionals. She attended Milford High School from 2009 until graduation in 2013.

== Gymnastics career ==
=== 2005-07: Junior Olympic and Pre-elite career ===
In 2005, Jetter moved up to level nine. She advanced to Easterns and placed nineteenth in the all-around. In 2006, at the age of eleven, Amanda was crowned the Eastern Level 9 champion in the all-around, on bars and on floor; placing higher than eventual 2012 Olympic Floor champion Alexandra Raisman. Later in the season, she qualified to pre-elite status and competed at the U.S. Challenge; finishing fourth in the all-around.

In 2007, Jetter moved up to level ten. She was State champion in the all-around, on vault and on floor. At J.O. Nationals, Amanda was crowned National Champion in the all-around, on beam and floor.

=== 2007-09: Junior International Elite career ===
Following the level ten season, Jetter qualified to Junior International Elite status and competed at the U.S. Classic in Battle Creek, Michigan. At Classics, she was seventh in the all-around and thus earned a qualification berth to Nationals. In mid-August 2007, Jetter travelled to San Jose, California for the 2008 VISA Nationals. She placed fourteenth in the all-around.

Amanda returned to elite competition for the 2008 season at the U.S. Classic in Houston, Texas. Jetter placed fourth in the all-around as well as taking home two silver medals; one on floor and one on beam, tied with McKenzie Wofford. In June, in Boston, Massachusetts, Jetter finished fifth in the all-around. In addition, she won a bronze medal on floor exercise. After the competition, she was named to the 2008-09 U.S. Junior National team. Amanda received her first international assignment at the International Artistic Gymnastics Challenge in Woluwe-Saint-Lambert. She placed third in the all-around.

Jetter's final year as a junior elite was in 2009. Jetter travelled to Des Moines, Iowa to compete at the U.S. Classic. However, after a rough competition, she placed fourteenth in the all-around. Although, she won a silver medal on floor. In the middle of August, Amanda competed in her third Nationals in Dallas, Texas. She was fifth in the all-around. Jetter was named to the 2009-10 U.S. National team; her second team. In December, she travelled to Calais, France to compete at the International Tournament of Calais. She and club teammate, Cassandra Whitcomb, won the competition.

=== 2010-12: Senior International Elite career ===
Amanda moved up to the senior elite level for the 2010 season; although she was fifteen at every competition she competed in. On March 21, 2010, Jetter was named to the 2010 City of Jesolo Trophy team. Later in the month, Jetter travelled with the team to Venice to compete at the competition. She contributed to the team in the all-around with a score of 55.450. Later, in July, Jetter competed at the U.S. Classic in Chicago and was second in the all-around. In August, Amanda travelled to Hartford, Connecticut for the National Championships. However, in a training session on the day of the first day of competition, Jetter strained her achilles and was forced to withdraw from the competition. Jetter petitioned to be added to the 2010-11 U.S. National team and to attend the 2010 World Artistic Gymnastics Championships training camp, which was successfully accepted. Jetter wasn't named to the 2010 World Championships team.

In March 2011, Jetter competed at the 2011 City of Jesolo Trophy, her second time at the event. She received an all-around score of 53.600 but sustained another achilles injury during her vault, the final event of the competition. On May 19, 2011, she verbally committed to the Alabama Crimson Tide gymnastics team. Amanda returned to competition at the 2011 U.S. Classic in Chicago but competed on bars and beam only. A month later, in Saint Paul, Minnesota, she competed at the U.S. Nationals and competed on the same two events. After the competition, she made the 2011-12 U.S. National team.

Jetter returned to elite competition at the 2012 U.S. Classic. She finished tenth in the all-around; the first time she'd competed all four events in competition since Jesolo 2011. She advanced to Nationals in St. Louis, Missouri and finished fourteenth in the all-around. Jetter didn't make Olympic Trials and so therefore, didn't make the Olympic team. Shortly after Nationals, on June 22, 2012, Jetter announced that she would be retiring from elite gymnastics to focus on college gymnastics, as per her Twitter account.

=== 2013: Brief Level 10 stint ===
On November 26, 2012, Jetter signed the National Letter of Intent to the University of Alabama. Jetter briefly moved down to Level 10 for the 2013 season. In January, she competed at her club's in-house competition, CGA Coaches Spectacular, and was second in the open division. Later, in March, Jetter competed at States and was second in the all-around as well as in all four events.

=== 2014-2016: College gymnastics career ===
==== 2014 season: Freshman ====
Jetter made her collegiate debut on January 10, 2014, at home against Missouri Tigers on bars, where she scored 9.925. At the SEC Championships, she competed on bars and floor; contributing scores of 9.900 and 9.850. At Regionals, she scored a 9.875 on bars. During Nationals, held in Birmingham, Alabama, Jetter provided a 9.850 in the semi-final round. She scored the same number during the Super Six team finals.

==== 2015 season: Sophomore ====
Amanda returned for her sophomore season in 2015. Jetter opened her season at a home meet against Arizona Wildcats and scored a 9.100 on bars. At the SEC Championships, in Duluth, Georgia, Jetter scored a 9.800 on bars and 9.875 on floor. Jetter scored a 9.800 on bars and a 9.850 on floor at the NCAA Regional at state rivals, Auburn University. At Nationals, in Fort Worth, Texas, she scored the same scores as she did at Regionals. Competing the same two events in the Super Six, Amanda scored a 9.875 on bars and a 9.850 on floor.

==== 2016 season: Junior ====
Jetter competed for her third year for the Crimson Tide team.
