= Dominic Zito =

American choreographer (born 1982)

- Born: June 13, 1982 (age 43); Ohio, U.S.
- Education: Kent State University; Solon High School (1996–00)
- Alma mater: University of Akron
- Occupation: Choreographer
- Years active: late 1990s–present
- Employer: USA Gymnastics

Dominic Zito (born June 13, 1982) is an American choreographer. He is the National Team choreographer for USA Gymnastics and has worked with gymnasts, including Olympians, such as Jordyn Wieber, Kyla Ross, Gabby Douglas, Simone Biles, Dominique Moceanu and Elise Ray.

== Early life and career ==
Dominic Zito was born on June 13, 1982, in Ohio. In 1989, at the age of seven, he started gymnastics training. In 1995, he started choreographing routines for a local gymnastics club after they couldn't afford to hire a professional choreographer. After numerous free routines in his area, his talent began to get recognized. Zito decided to quit gymnastics and graduated from Solon High School in 2000. After high school graduation, Dominic enrolled to Kent State University as a Dance major. However, after one academic year, he decided to drop Dance as his major and major in Marketing. He still minored in Dance. Whilst attending Kent State, he started coaching and choreographing for a local gym. However, in 2001, renowned gymnastics coach of Buckeye Gymnastics, Kittia Carpenter, saw his routines at the Ohio State Championships and was immediately impressed, calling him the next day. Later, renowned coach, Mary Lee Tracy; owner and president of Cincinnati Gymnastics Academy, recruited him to choreograph her students' routines.
