= Erica Stokes =

Former United States gymnast

Erica Stokes is a former United States gymnast. Stokes trained with Bela Karolyi in Houston, Texas.

== Early life ==
Stokes spent three summers training with the Karolyi's. When she was 9 years old, Karolyi invited her to move to Houston to train at the Karolyi Ranch full time. Her family agreed, and later moved to Houston to join their daughter.

== Gymnastics ==
Stokes finished second in the 1989 Junior National Championships and fourth in the 1990 National Championships behind Kim Zmeskal and Betty Okino. She was unable to compete in the 1990 Goodwill Games due to an injury.

Her mother recalled that "she was guaranteed a spot on the '92 Olympics team as much as anyone can be guaranteed a spot a year ahead of time". Stokes appeared in a Minute Maid commercial with other Olympic hopefuls and her parents accepted money from Minute Maid, as well as a $12,000 annual stipend from USGF. Because of this she was ineligible to compete in college gymnastics.

She developed bulimia nervosa and left Karolyi's gym. She began training with Steve Nunno, who was also coaching Shannon Miller. She finished sixth at the World Championship Trials, which should have secured her a spot on the World Championship team but the USGF decided to combine scores from both the trials and the national championships. Stokes had been unable to compete in nationals because of a shoulder injury, and she dropped to ninth, losing her place on the team. Erica quit gymnastics nine months before the 1992 Barcelona Olympics.
