= Hilary Grivich =

American gymnast (1977–1997)

- Full name: Hilary Coplin Grivich
- Born: May 23, 1977 Houston, Texas
- Died: May 4, 1997 (aged 19) Houston, Texas

Gymnastics career
- Discipline: Women's artistic gymnastics
- Country represented: United States
- Club: Karolyi's
- Former coaches: Béla Károlyi; Marta Károlyi
- Retired: 1992
Medal record
World Championships
Silver medal – second place	1991 Indianapolis	Team

Hilary Coplin Grivich (May 23, 1977 – May 4, 1997) was an American gymnast and diver. She was a member of the silver medal-winning American team at the 1991 World Artistic Gymnastics Championships and the 1990 junior national champion in gymnastics.

== Career ==
One of the original members of the "Károlyi six-pack", Grivich trained under Béla Károlyi in Houston. In her first season at the senior level, she was a member of the silver medal-winning American team at the 1991 World Championships, acting as the leadoff gymnast during compulsories and competing second in the lineup on all four events in team finals.

Grivich was a contender for the 1992 Olympics, placing seventh in the all-around and third on balance beam and floor exercise at that year's national championships. However, at the Olympic Trials, she placed eighth and did not qualify for the Olympic squad. Béla and Márta Károlyi, and some other gymnastics insiders, claimed that U.S. judges had deliberately underscored Grivich to keep the team from having too many Károlyi club gymnasts.

Grivich retired from gymnastics after the Olympics. In 1993, she switched her focus to diving. After only two years in the sport, she earned a scholarship to the University of Houston. She excelled in NCAA competition and hoped to eventually make the U.S. Olympic team as a diver.

== Death and Legacy ==
Less than a month before her 20th birthday, Grivich was killed in a car accident on a Houston highway. A scholarship with the Strake Jesuit Scholarship Fund was established in her name. In addition, Grivich's diving club, Woodlands Diving Academy, used to hold an annual elite meet in her honour, the Hilary Grivich Memorial Invitational, before renaming it the "Laura Wilkinson Golden Invitational."
