= Michelle Campi =

American gymnast (born 1976)

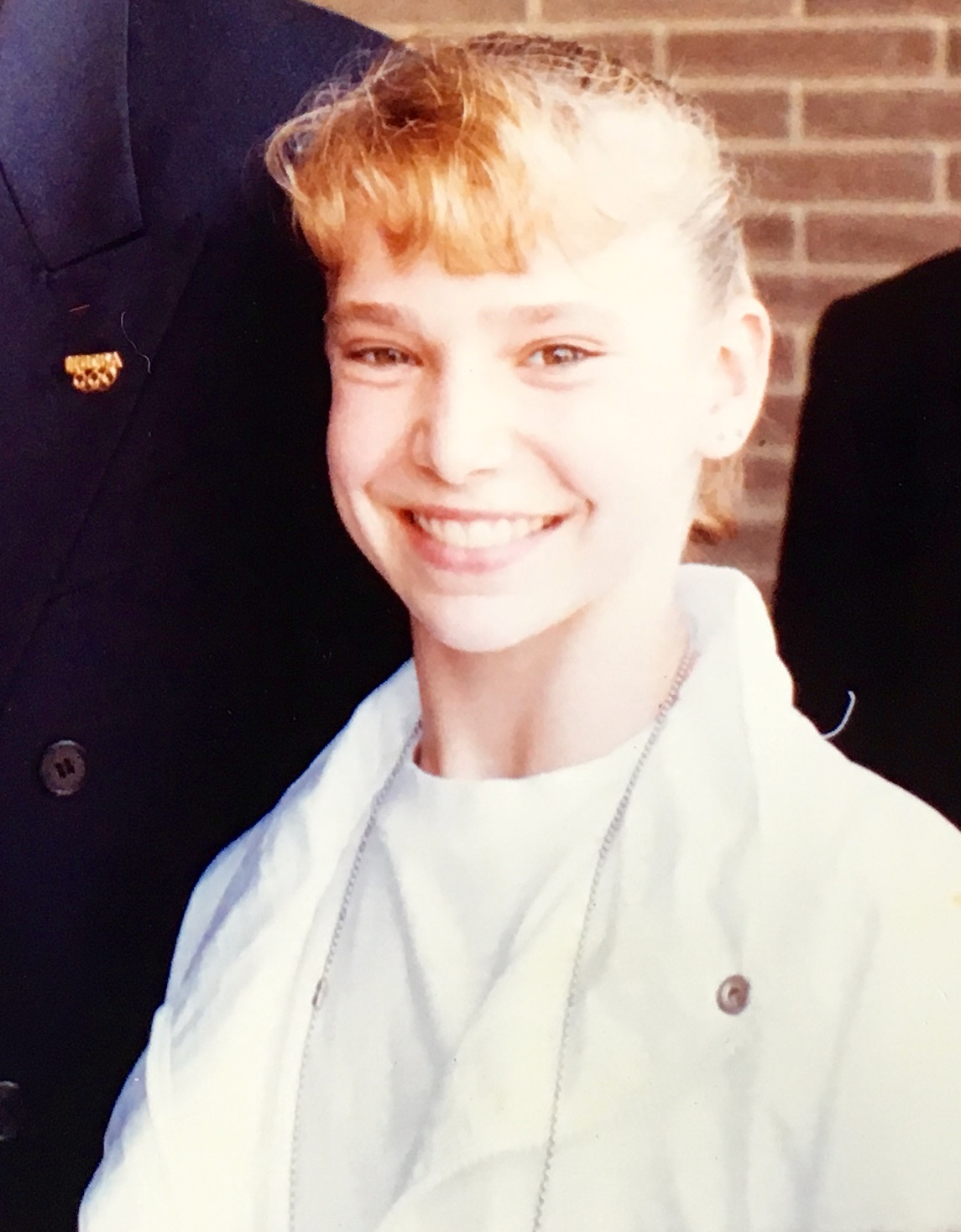
- Campi in 1992

Personal information
- Born: July 29, 1976 (age 50)

Gymnastics career
- Discipline: Women's artistic gymnastics
- Country represented: United States (1991–1993)
- College team: University of Washington
- Gym: Poszar's Gymnastics; Dynamo Gymnastics; Karolyi's Gymnastics
- Head coaches: Geza Poszar, Rick Newman; Steve Nunno; Bela & Marta Karolyi
- Retired: yes
Medal record
Women's artistic gymnastics
Representing United States
World Championships
Silver medal – second place	1991 Indianapolis	Team

Michelle Campi (born July 29, 1976) is an American artistic gymnast. As a member of the U.S. Women's Gymnastics team at the 1991 World Artistic Gymnastics Championships, she won a silver medal in the team competition. Campi was the alternate for the U.S. women's team at the 1992 Olympic Games in Barcelona.

Campi is also an artist and has work on display with the Art of the Olympians.
