= Mina Kim =

South Korean political activist (born 1989)

- Born: Kim Min-ah; August 10, 1989 (age 37); South Korea
- Education: Pennsylvania State University (BA)
- Occupations: Political activist; YouTuber; nonprofit executive; organizer
- Organizations: Build Up Korea
- Movement: Conservatism; Christian right Trumpism

YouTube information
- Channel: 엠킴MKim TV 34%
- Years active: 2019–present
- Subscribers: 197 thousand
- Views: 22.7 million

Korean name
- Hangul: 김민아
- RR: Gim Mina
- MR: Kim Mina
- Last updated: 20 March 2026

Mina Kim (Korean: 김민아; born August 10, 1989) is a South Korean right-wing political activist and YouTuber. She is best known for being the founder of the conservative grassroots youth organization Build Up Korea in 2023, and serving as president since then. Starting in 2019, she hosts the MKim TV [34%] podcast on her YouTube channel. She has allied with fellow conservative activists, such as Donald Trump Jr., Steve Bannon, Charlie Kirk, and Jack Posobiec, and has supported U.S. President Donald Trump.

== Early life and career ==
Mina Kim was born on August 10, 1989, in South Korea, as an only child. She immigrated to the United States at age 12. She became a born-again Christian at age 15, during a mission trip in South Korea. She graduated Pennsylvania State University with a degree in advertising. She moved back to South Korea, where she was a part-time professor at Kwangwoon University from 2020 to January 2023.

== YouTube channel ==
On April 15, 2019, Kim created a YouTube channel called 엠킴MKim TV [34%], to cover the 2020 United States presidential election for a South Korean audience. In 2024, she interviewed Donald Trump Jr. on her channel.

== Build Up Korea ==
Kim founded Build Up Korea in February 2023. It held its inaugural conference on November 11, 2023, at the Coex Auditorium.

At Build Up Korea 2025, Charlie Kirk was the keynote speaker on both days of the event. During an interview with Kirk, Kim expressed how she was inspired by his founding of Turning Point USA. This event and another one in Tokyo, Japan hosted by Sanseitō would be Kirk's final completed events before his assassination on September 10.

== Political positions and activities ==
Kim considers herself conservative, and has been described as "Young MAGA" and Korean MAGA. Since the founding of Build Up Korea, she has aligned herself with far-right and alt-right activists from the United States, such as Steve Bannon and Jack Posobiec. Suh Myung-sahm, a professor of religious studies at Sogang University who has spent years researching far-right Protestant movements in South Korea and the US, says Kim could be a key link between the ultraconservative factions of the two countries.

=== South Korea–United States relations ===
Kim seeks to maintain South Korea–United States relations, whilst distancing from China and its ruling Communist Party. She promotes a pro-American foreign policy for South Korea. Kim said, "I spoke with [Trump Jr.] personally, and he said that if a leader emerges in South Korea who will maintain pro-American relations, President Trump will support him 100 percent."

On the subject of defense cost-sharing between the two nations, Kim said, "The United States has weakened, while South Korea is now a developed nation with significant growth. The United States believes it can no longer lead the free order alone, and is therefore asking for help from allies like South Korea. Calling South Korea a 'money machine' is a way of saying, "Let's go together, as a wealthy nation capable of self-reliance, and ask for help." It's an expression of asking for a shared sense of responsibility and defense of the free order."

=== Donald Trump ===
Kim has been supportive of Donald Trump since the 2020 election. She doesn't consider Trump as an isolationist, but "America First." Kim believes Trump considers dictators like Kim Jong-Un, Xi Jinping, and Vladimir Putin to be "cancerous tumors."

In regards to tariffs imposed by Trump during his second term, Kim said, "I don't think Korean companies need to worry too much about tariffs."

Kim explained, in regards to a question on Trump's high demands, "President Trump initially makes a large demand, but then adopts a 'give and take' approach depending on the level of cooperation and investment from the other country. During his first administration, he asked South Korea for 10 trillion won, but ultimately settled at around 1 trillion won. I believe negotiations will be possible if we continue to persuade South Korea through pro-American diplomacy."

=== Lee Jae-myung ===
On an episode of Steve Bannon's War Room in July 2025, Kim said in reference to South Korean president Lee Jae-myung, “Korea just elected a left-leaning socialist president... And right now, Korea is actually leaning towards more favorable policies for China, and that's why I'm trying to erect a movement called Build Up Korea, a grassroots freedom movement."

=== Yoon Suk Yeol ===
Kim was supported the declaration of martial law by former President Yoon Suk-yeol. She asserted that he “believes that the National Assembly has been infiltrated by [. . .] foreign interests, particularly pro-CCP forces, and there are even pro-North Korea sympathizers within our legislative body.”

=== Christianity and politics ===
Kim is a Christian, and her politics stem from evangelical Christian theology. In 2023, Kim stated that "it is crucial to have a clear biblical standard on these issues, including homosexuality."

She has promoted Dominion theology, a tenant of Christian nationalism; "Some people ask why the church should get involved in politics. However, the Bible also states that the authority of leaders comes from God (Romans 13:1-7). Due to faulty leadership, countless policies have been established in the United States that run counter to God's will... We must elect leaders whose political views align with God's Word."

Kim claimed that both the United States and South Korea were founded on Christian values. At the inaugural Build Up Korea 2023 conference, she stated that "The United States was founded on God's principles, as stated in the Constitution and the Declaration of Independence, and this is what enabled it to become the world's most powerful nation." She then stated that "Syngman Rhee, the first president of the Republic of Korea, met God in prison, realized the true value of freedom while living in the United States, and wanted to plant this freedom in the Republic of Korea. In return, he made many sacrifices, and the Republic of Korea gained freedom."

=== Social issues ===
Kim is opposed to same-sex marriage. In reference to Joe Biden signing the Respect for Marriage Act, Kim stated, "President Joe Biden signed a bill today legalizing same-sex marriage. The United States was founded under God's guidance, but President Biden signed a bill legalizing same-sex marriage at the federal, not state, level. This event alone should make us pray for America."
