= Christine Nguyen =

Visual artist

Christine Nguyen (born 1977) is a visual artist whose photo-based work revolve around ecosystems and the natural world with an emphasis on the vastness of the sea and outer space. Her art is displayed across the United States and internationally.

== Early life and education ==
Nguyen was born in Mountainview, California, USA to Vietnamese parents. Her father was a commercial fisherman, and as a result she spent a lot of time around the sea, gaining artistic inspiration from the things she saw him pull up. In 1999, she graduated with a BFA from California State University, Long Beach and received an MFA from the University of California, Irvine in 2004.

== Work ==
Nguyen's work is photo-based, but she layers many mediums to create her final work. She often will manually draw photonegatives onto mylar, and transmit light through them onto photosensitive paper. This is based in the cyanotype process. She uses paint, spray paints and drawing in her work as well as materials such as salt crystals, algae and borax.

== Selected solo exhibitions ==
2010: Rock Paper Salt, Huntington Beach Art Center, Huntington Beach, California, USA.

2014–2015: The Cosmos and the Sea, Galerie Quynh, Ho Chi Minh City, Vietnam.

2021: Cosmic Gardens, AMcE Creative Arts, Seattle, Washington, USA.
