= Kendall Beck =

American artistic gymnast

- Full name: Kendall Rhea Beck
- Born: August 6, 1981 (age 45)

Gymnastics career
- Discipline: Women's artistic gymnastics
- Country represented: United States ((1996–2000))
- College team: Stanford
- Club: Parkettes
- Head coach: Donna Strauss
Medal record
U.S. Senior Nationals
Gold medal – first place	1997 Denver	Balance Beam
Bronze medal – third place	2000 St. Louis	Vault

Kendall Rhea Beck (born August 6, 1981) is an artistic gymnast from the United States.

She was a member of the US junior national team from 1996 to 1997, and was the US national junior vault champion that year. She was a member of the senior national team from 1997 to 2000. In 1997, she was the US national beam champion, and was known for a connected full twist on the beam. She was a member of the World Championship team in 1997 that finished sixth place.

Although she suffered many injuries from 1996 to 1999 (back injury after 1996 nationals and two ACL injuries, one of which kept her out of the 1998 Goodwill Games), she was selected as a member of the 1998 USA Pacific Alliance Team and the 1998 International Team Competition team, both which earned gold medals. Beck suffered a third ACL tear just before the 1999 US Classic. Despite suffering three ACL tears in four years, Kendall finished 3rd on vault and 10th AA at the USA National Championships in 2000, earning her one of 12 competitor positions at the USA Olympic trials. Unfortunately she was forced to withdraw from that competition after only one event with another injury.

Kendall received a full gymnastics scholarship to Stanford University in the fall of 2000, but was unable to compete her freshman year due to her 4th ACL injury suffered in training. Kendall came back in 2001 to compete her sophomore year earning All-American honors on vault at the NCAA Gymnastics Championships. Kendall was the first ever Stanford gymnast to earn a perfect 10 on the vault. She competed her junior year on a torn shoulder labrum, had it repaired in the summer along with a fifth knee surgery, and returned to help the Stanford Cardinal win the Pac-10 Championships and to achieve a first-ever top three finish at the 2004 NCAA Championships in Los Angeles. She graduated from Stanford in 2004 having been named as an Academic All-American and has finished medical school. She is now an assistant professor of gastroenterology at UC San Francisco.
