= Wendy Bruce =

American gymnast

- Full name: Wendy Suzanne Bruce-Martin
- Born: March 23, 1973 (age 53) Plainview, Texas, U.S.
- Height: 5 ft 1 in (155 cm)

Gymnastics career
- Discipline: Women's artistic gymnastics
Medal record
Women's gymnastics
Representing the United States
Olympic Games
Bronze medal – third place	1992 Barcelona	Team

Wendy Suzanne Bruce-Martin (born March 23, 1973) is a retired gymnast from the United States. She was a member of the U.S. Women's Gymnastics Team at the 1989 World Championships in Stuttgart, Germany, and the 1992 Summer Olympic Games in Barcelona, Spain.

At the 1989 World Championships, she placed eleventh in the individual all-around, and the U.S. women's team finished fourth.

At the 1992 Olympics, the U.S. women's team won a bronze medal, which was the first U.S. team medal won at a fully attended Olympic Games.

Wendy is married with two children and is the owner of Get Psyched! Mental Coaching.

Wendy is a graduate of Seminole Community College.
