= Mary Lee Tracy =

American gymnastics coach

- Education: Colerain High School
- Occupation: Gymnastics coach
- Years active: 1989-present
- Employer(s): Cincinnati Gymnastics Academy; USA Gymnastics

Mary Lee Tracy is an American gymnastics coach and owner of Cincinnati Gymnastics Academy, a program in Fairfield, Ohio.

== Personal life ==
Tracy was born in Cincinnati, and has lived in Ohio all her life. Tracy attended Colerain High School and was a 1977 graduate. After graduating high school, Tracy joined the Cincinnati Ben-Gals cheerleading squad for NFL team Cincinnati Bengals.

== Coaching career ==
Tracy started the Cincinnati Gymnastics Academy in 1988 and has created over 25 national team members and 4 Olympians.

In the past, she has coached Amanda Borden, Jaycie Phelps, Kim Zmeskal, Alyssa Beckerman, Dominique Moceanu, Ashley Priess and more recently, Kayla Williams, Amelia Hundley, Lexie Priessman, and Amanda Jetter. Cincinnati Gymnastics Academy currently has gymnast Emily Gaskins.

In 2014, Lexie Priessman, the program's former top elite gymnast, decided to leave the gym, expressing that she needed a "change". Previously, in 2013, an incident occurred with former CGA elite gymnast Alexis Beucler when Tracy created a petition to force her to drop to Level 10, causing Beucler to later move to Florida to train with Brandy Johnson.

In a 2016 television interview after Dr. Larry Nassar had been indicted on federal child pornography charges and after dozens of gymnasts had accused him of molestation, Tracy defended him as a doctor who had “helped so many kids in their careers” and “protected them.”

In September 2018, after USA Gymnastics hired Mary Lee Tracy to be its elite development director for women, Tracy was heavily criticized for initially defending sexual molester team doctor Larry Nassar. Three-time Olympic champion Aly Raisman spoke out on Twitter against the federation’s hiring of Tracy, saying: “USA Gymnastics has appointed someone who, in my view, supported Nassar, victim-shamed survivors and has shown no willingness to learn from the past." Tracy was fired three days after she had been hired.
