= Janae Cox =

American gymnast (born 1985)

Janae Asbury (nee Cox; January 30, 1985) is an American former college gymnast. During her tenure at West Virginia University, Cox ranked first in program history in career all-around meets competed and second in career meets competed. She also ranked first in career 39.0-plus all-around scores with 37. Overall, Cox was a three-time NCAA Championships individual qualifier in gymnastics and First Team All-American.

== Early life and education ==
Asbury was born on January 30, 1985, in Louisville, Kentucky as the youngest of four children born to Rick and Jan Cox. She began training in gymnastics at the Southern Indiana Gymnastics School by the age of five. While attending Charlestown Senior High School, she competed with Team USA at international competitions and was crowned the Junior Olympic National All-Around, Vault, and Floor Champion. As a result of her achievements, Asbury was granted a full scholarship to West Virginia University (WVU). She also won a silver medal at the 1998 Junior Pan American Championships with a score of 35.700.8.

== Career ==
Upon joining the gymnastics team at WVU, Asbury became the first athlete from Mountaineer to earn East Atlantic Gymnastics League (EAGL) Rookie of the Year honors and set the school record with an all-around score of 39.675. As a result, she qualified for the NCAA Championships but her all-around score was not enough to qualify for the Super Six finals. The following year, Asbury returned to WVU and captured the all-around title at the Eagle Classic. Based on her performance, she was awarded her third EAGL Gymnast of the Week award of the year and fifth of her career. Although she qualified for the Nationals, Asbury suffered two falls on the floor exercises and was unable to recover as she placed last among all-around competitors.

At the start of her junior year, Asbury earned a 39.0 score at a meet, making her the all-time school leader with 25 career performances of 39.0 or higher. On April 14, 2007, Asbury and her teammate Aimee Brown were in a car accident but she was still able to compete at the 2007 NCAA Southeast Regional. She recorded a 9.9 on the floor exercise and earned another 9.9 on the vault, making her the first WVU gymnast to score over 2,000 career points. At the conclusion of her career, Asbury earned All-American status at the NCAA National Championships with an all-around score of 39.075. She also ranked first in program history in career all-around meets competed and second in career meets competed.

== Post-career ==
Upon retiring, Asbury returned to Indiana to teach third grade and was a gymnastics coach for her club team for two years. She married Josh Asbury in 2010 and moved back to Morgantown to teach third grade and serve as a volunteer assistant with WVU gymnastics. She also became an instructor at the Shall We Dance Studio and had three children.
