= Emily Schild =

American artistic gymnast

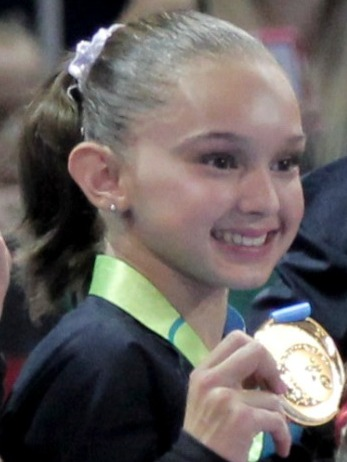
- Schild at the 2015 Pan American Games

Personal information
- Full name: Emily Jane Schild
- Born: August 19, 1998 (age 28) Fort Wayne, Indiana, U.S.
- Height: 1.47 m (4 ft 10 in)

Gymnastics career
- Discipline: Women's artistic gymnastics
- Country represented: United States; (2015–17)
- College team: Georgia Gymdogs (2017–21)
- Club: Everest
Medal record
Representing United States
Pan American Games
| Gold medal – first place | 2015 Toronto | Team |

Emily Jane Schild (born August 19, 1998, in Fort Wayne, Indiana) is an American artistic gymnast. She was a member of the U.S. National Team from 2015 to 2017 and made her international debut at the 2015 City of Jesolo Trophy. At the 2015 Pan-American Games in Toronto, she was part of the gold-winning US team.

== Personal life ==
Emily Jane Schild was born on August 19, 1998, in Fort Wayne, Indiana, parents David and Maria Schild. The family moved to North Carolina when Schild was around 5 years old.

A member of the National Honor Society, Schild was homeschooled through the NCVP and graduated high school in 2017. Schild attended the University of Georgia and competed on their gymnastics program.

== Gymnastics career ==
=== 2013–14: Level 10 and Junior International Elite ===
Schild qualified to the 2013 Nastia Liukin Cup as a Level 10 athlete and finished nineteenth all-around. Later in the season, she tested for Junior International Elite and qualified for the 2013 U.S. Classic. Later, she advanced to the 2013 P&G U.S. Nationals and was twenty-fifth all-around and eighth on vault.

Schild was nursing an injury during 2014 and was forced to sit out the whole season.

=== 2015–present: Senior International Elite and National Team breakthrough ===
Schild was added to the U.S. Senior National team after the 2015 City of Jesolo Trophy selection camp, where she was also selected to the U.S. team. In 2016, Schild was named to the National Team and invited to compete at the 2016 Olympic trials, but was not selected for the Olympic team.
