= Cincinnati Gymnastics Academy =

US women's artistic gymnastics academy

CGA
- Full name: Cincinnati Gymnastics Academy
- Nicknames: CGA
- Sport: Women's artistic gymnastics
- Based in: Fairfield, Ohio
- President: Mary Lee Tracy
- Website: cincinnatigymnastics.com

Cincinnati Gymnastics Academy (CGA), is an American women's artistic gymnastics academy in Fairfield, Ohio. It has trained Olympians and world champions, including Amanda Borden and Jaycie Phelps.

== History ==
The academy was opened in the 1980s by current president and head coach Mary Lee Tracy.

Previously, as gym owner Tracy did not conduct background checks on prospective coaches at CGA. As a result, CGA employed Ray Adams, who was later convicted and jailed for sexual abuse. Tracy said she never had a problem with Adams. He left voluntarily, and she gave him a good reference. Adams worked in at least a dozen gyms in four states, was fired at least six times, was criminally charged four times, and once pleaded guilty to misdemeanor battery for abusing four little girls.

In a 2016 television interview after Dr. Larry Nassar had been indicted on federal child pornography charges and after dozens of gymnasts had accused him of molestation, Tracy defended him as a doctor who had “helped so many kids in their careers” and “protected them.”

Tracy was named as the United States women's national artistic gymnastics team elite development coordinator by USA Gymnastics in August 2018. The move quickly came under scrutiny from Aly Raisman and CGA alumna Alyssa Beckerman due to Tracy's ties with Larry Nassar. Three-time Olympic champion Aly Raisman spoke out on Twitter against the federation’s hiring of Tracy, saying: “USA Gymnastics has appointed someone who, in my view, supported Nassar, victim-shamed survivors and has shown no willingness to learn from the past." USA Gymnastics fired her 3 days later.

== Notable gymnasts & alumni ==
Gymnasts who have trained at CGA include:

- Alyssa Beckerman
- Amanda Borden
- Emily Gaskins
- Amelia Hundley
- Amanda Jetter
- Lilly Lippeatt
- Jaycie Phelps
- Kristy Powell
- Ashley Priess
- Lexie Priessman
- Samantha Sheehan
- Kayla Williams
- Kim Zmeskal
