= Steve Nunno =

American gymnastics coach

Biographical details
- Education: University of Massachusetts Amherst (1975–79)

Coaching career (HC unless noted)
- 1983–1985: Oklahoma (asst.)
- 2001–2006: Oklahoma

Head coaching record
- Overall: 106–66

Accomplishments and honors

Championships
- Big 12 Champions (2004)

Steve Nunno is an American artistic gymnastics coach.

== Career ==
Nunno coached Shannon Miller to the 1992 and 1996 Olympics.

He was rehired at Oklahoma as co-head coach for the Oklahoma Sooners women's gymnastics team alongside Becky Buwick-Switzer. Upon hiring, he was to be named head coach the following season. He had previously served as an assistant coach at Oklahoma from 1983 to 1985.

He resigned from his position with Oklahoma in May 2006 shortly after the university admitted to NCAA violations surrounding the women's gymnastics program.
