= Achieving the Perfect 10 =

- Starring: Ashley Barry; Kayla Stark; Nicole Harris; Annie Fogerty; Kristina Coccia; Krista Jasper; Kristen Maloney; Paige Cipolloni; Kristal Uzelac; Kristie Phillips; Donna Strauss; Tia Orlando; Geralen Stack-Eaton
- Country of origin: United States
- Original language: English

Production
- Producer: CNN

Original release
- Network: CNN
- Release: August 10, 2003

Achieving The Perfect 10 is a television documentary film released on CNN on August 10, 2003 about young girls training gymnastics at the highly competitive Parkettes National Gymnastics Training Center in Allentown, Pennsylvania.

The documentary follows several Parkettes gymnasts—ranging from the novice competitor Ashley Barry to the elites Nicole Harris, Annie Fogerty and Kristina Coccia—through their daily training routines. It focuses largely on the dynamics between the athletes and their coaches, their parents' sacrifices, expectations and observations, and their experiences dealing with injuries and preparing for competitions.

Several sequences in the documentary have sparked controversy and debate in the gymnastics community and others, such as one in which a seven-year-old gymnast works out on a broken ankle at the urging of her parents.

== Starring ==
Ashley Barry, Kayla Stark, Nicole Harris, Annie Fogerty, Kristina Coccia, Krista Jasper, Kristen Maloney, Paige Cipolloni, Kristal Uzelac, Kristie Phillips, Donna Strauss, Tia Orlando, Geralen "Lou" Stack-Eaton, John Min, and others.
