= Pacific Rim Championships – Women's individual all-around =

Three medals are awarded: gold for first place, silver for second place, and bronze for third place. Tie breakers have not been used in every year. In the event of a tie between two gymnasts, both names are listed, and the following position (second for a tie for first, third for a tie for second) is left empty because a medal was not awarded for that position. If three gymnastics tied for a position, the following two positions are left empty.

== Medalists ==
Year	Location	Gold	Silver	Bronze	Ref.
1998	(Canada) Winnipeg	(United States) Kristen Maloney	(Australia) Zeena McLaughlin	(United States) Sierra Sapunar	
2000	(New Zealand) Christchurch	(United States) Elise Ray	(China) Ling Jie	(United States) Morgan White (Australia) Lisa Skinner	
2002	(Canada) Vancouver	(United States) Tasha Schwikert	(United States) Terin Humphrey	(United States) Kristal Uzelac	
2004	(United States) Honolulu	(United States) Allyse Ishino	(United States) Carly Patterson	(Australia) Allana Slater	
2006	(United States) Honolulu	(United States) Chellsie Memmel	(United States) Nastia Liukin	(Australia) Hollie Dykes	
2008	(United States) San Jose	(United States) Nastia Liukin	(United States) Jana Bieger	(Australia) Daria Joura	
2010	(Australia) Melbourne	(United States) Rebecca Bross	(United States) Aly Raisman	(Russia) Ksenia Afanasyeva	
2012	(United States) Everett	(United States) Jordyn Wieber	(United States) Kyla Ross	(Canada) Peng-Peng Lee	
2014	(Canada) Richmond	(United States) Elizabeth Price	(United States) Kyla Ross	(Canada) Ellie Black	
2016	(United States) Everett	(United States) Simone Biles	(United States) Aly Raisman	(Japan) Nagi Kajita	
2018	(Colombia) Medellín	(United States) Grace McCallum	(United States) Morgan Hurd	(Canada) Haley de Jong	
2024	(Colombia) Cali	(United States) Jayla Hang	(United States) Madray Johnson	(Canada) Kahlyn Lawson	
