= Courtney Kupets =

American artistic gymnast (born 1986)

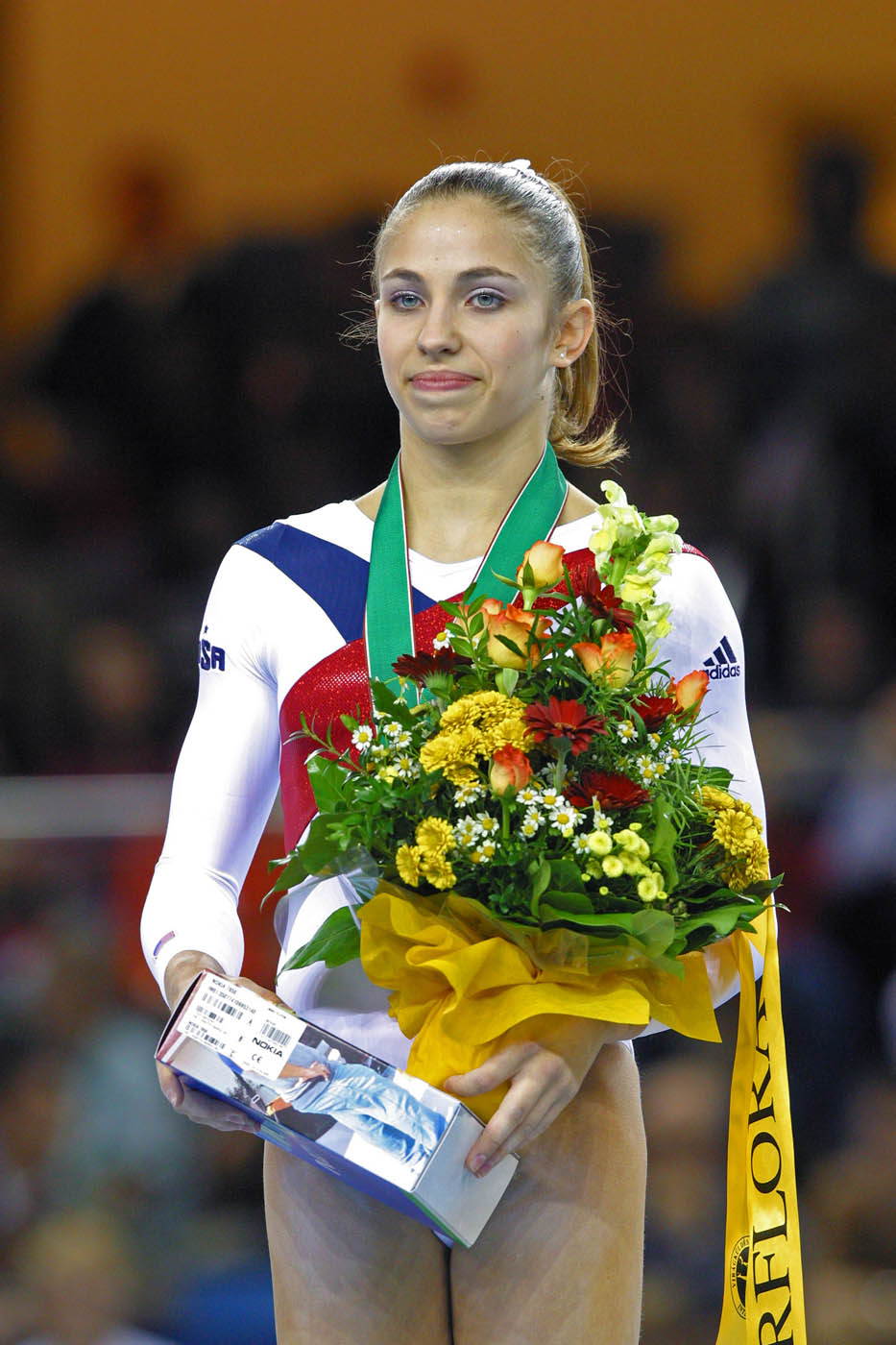
- Kupets at the 2002 World Championships in Debrecen, Hungary

Personal information
- Full name: Courtney Anne Kupets
- Born: July 27, 1986 (age 40) Bedford, Texas, U.S.
- Height: 5 ft 0¾ in

Gymnastics career
- Discipline: Women's artistic gymnastics
- Country represented: United States; (1999–2004)
- College team: Georgia Gymdogs (University of Georgia)
- Club: Hill's Gymnastics
- Head coach: Suzanne Yoculan
- Assistant coach: Jay Clark
- Former coach: Kelli Hill
- Retired: April 18, 2009
Medal record
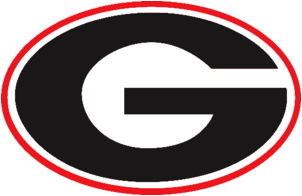
Representing United States
Artistic Gymnastics
Olympic Games
Silver medal – second place	2004 Athens	Team
Bronze medal – third place	2004 Athens	Uneven Bars
World Championships
Gold medal – first place	2002 Debrecen	Uneven Bars
Gold medal – first place	2003 Anaheim	Team
Representing University of Georgia
NCAA Championships
Gold medal – first place	2006 Auburn	Balance Beam
Gold medal – first place	2006 Auburn	Uneven Bars
Gold medal – first place	2006 Auburn	Team
Gold medal – first place	2006 Auburn	All-Around
Gold medal – first place	2007 Salt Lake City	Vault
Gold medal – first place	2007 Salt Lake City	Team
Gold medal – first place	2007 Salt Lake City	All-Around
Gold medal – first place	2008 Athens	Team
Gold medal – first place	2009 Lincoln	Uneven Bars
Gold medal – first place	2009 Lincoln	Balance Beam
Gold medal – first place	2009 Lincoln	Floor Exercise
Gold medal – first place	2009 Lincoln	Team
Gold medal – first place	2009 Lincoln	All-Around
Silver medal – second place	2006 Auburn	Floor Exercise
Silver medal – second place	2007 Salt Lake City	Floor Exercise
Silver medal – second place	2007 Salt Lake City	Uneven Bars
Bronze medal – third place	2007 Salt Lake City	Balance Beam
Bronze medal – third place	2009 Lincoln	Vault

Courtney Kupets
Current position
- Title: Former Head coach
- Team: Georgia Bulldogs
- Conference: SEC

Biographical details
- Education: University of Georgia

Coaching career (HC unless noted)
- 2009–2010: Georgia (Student Asst.)
- 2017–2024: Georgia

Courtney Anne Kupets Carter (born July 27, 1986) is an American former artistic gymnast. She is a two-time Olympic medalist from the 2004 Olympics (silver in the team competition, bronze on uneven bars), the 2002 world champion on the uneven bars, the 2003 U.S. national all-around champion, and the 2004 U.S. national all-around co-champion (with Carly Patterson). She is also a member of the gold medal-winning U.S. team at the 2003 World Championships.

During her time at the University of Georgia, the Georgia women's gymnastics team won four straight NCAA national championships from 2006 to 2009. During the 2009–10 season, Kupets was a student assistant coach to the team's new head coach, Jay Clark. On May 9, 2017, Kupets-Carter was announced as the new head coach of the Georgia Gym Dogs. She was relieved as head coach of Georgia Gymnastics on April 19, 2024.

== Early life ==
Kupets was raised in Gaithersburg, Maryland, and trained at Hill's Gymnastics, the former gym of Olympians Dominique Dawes and Elise Ray. Kupets attended Colonel Zadok Magruder High School in Rockville, Maryland. After the 2004 Olympics, she competed for the University of Georgia (UGA) where she was a member of Alpha Omicron Pi women's fraternity, joining her older sister, Ashley Kupets.

== Gymnastics ==
=== Early gymnastics career ===
Kupets began gymnastics in 1989, earned a place on USA Gymnastics' TOPs developmental team in 1994, and reached the elite level in 1999. At her first U.S. National Championships in 1999, she placed eighth in the junior division and became a member of the junior national team.

=== Senior career ===
In 2002, her first year as a senior competitor, Kupets placed second at the American Cup, behind 2000 Olympian Tasha Schwikert, and placed eighth at Nationals. She was named to the U.S. team for the 2002 World Artistic Gymnastics Championships in Debrecen, Hungary, where she won the uneven bars final over five-time defending champion Svetlana Khorkina.

In 2003, Kupets won the U.S. Classic and then became the national champion for the first time. She was named to the U.S. team for the 2003 World Championships in Anaheim, California, and competed well in the qualifying round, contributing to the USA's high placement and qualifying to the all-around and uneven bars finals. However, during a practice session before the team finals, she tore her left Achilles tendon on a double Arabian somersault and was forced to withdraw from the event, returning home to Maryland immediately for surgery. The U.S. team went on to win the gold medal. Kupets was still considered a member of the squad and received credit and a medal for her contributions in the preliminaries.

In 2004, Kupets became co-national champion with Patterson. A few weeks later, she placed first at the Olympic Trials, earning a spot on the Olympic team.

==== 2004 Olympic Games ====
At the Olympics in Athens, the U.S. women won a silver medal. Kupets was expected to compete on bars, beam and floor in the team final; but a leg injury (later discovered to be a stress fracture in her hip) caused her to be suddenly withdrawn from the beam lineup. Mohini Bhardwaj took her place on the event, and Kupets competed only on bars and floor in the team final. She received the team's highest score on bars (9.662), putting the U.S. temporarily ahead of eventual winner Romania in the standings. But she also received the lowest score on floor exercise (9.187) after faltering on a dance combination while trying to turn on the opposite leg from the one she normally used.

Kupets competed in the individual all-around after placing fourth, with a total score of 37.937, in the qualifying round. In the final, she finished ninth with a total of 37.112 after stepping out of bounds on floor exercise and nearly falling on beam. However, she won the bronze medal in the uneven bars final with a score of 9.637, behind Émilie Le Pennec of France (9.687) and fellow American Terin Humphrey (9.662). She finished fifth in the balance beam final with a score of 9.375.

After returning from Athens, Kupets traveled across the United States with other gymnasts on an exhibition tour sponsored by T.J. Maxx.

=== NCAA career ===
In 2005, Kupets joined the University of Georgia gymnastics team on a full athletic scholarship. In her first season, she was named SEC freshman of the year and she contributed to the team's first-place finish at the 2006 NCAA Women's Gymnastics Championships and won the all-around, bars, and beam titles.

During the 2007 season, she received a 10.00 on the uneven bars while competing against the University of Alabama. It was the first 10.00 on the bars for Georgia since 2002 and the first of Kupets' career.

At the 2007 Southeastern Conference (SEC) Championships, Kupets tied teammate Katie Heenan for the all-around gold with a total of 39.600, and earned the vault and bars titles with scores of 9.975 and 9.925, respectively. In the team competition, Georgia lost to the University of Florida after winning the conference title for the previous three years. After this, Kupets led the team to the North Central Regional title and won the all-around despite the distraction of her older sister, Ashley Kupets, tearing her Achilles tendon during the warmup for floor exercise.

Two weeks later, Georgia upset Florida to win the preliminary session at Nationals. Kupets scored 39.75 on Day 1, with a 9.9 on beam and 9.95 on bars, floor, and vault, earning her second consecutive NCAA all-around title. In the Super 6 finals, Georgia totaled 197.85 and earned a third-consecutive NCAA team championship, the team's eighth overall. Kupets also won the individual vault title, along with silver medals on bars and floor and a bronze on beam. She was the only gymnast to medal on all four events.

Performing on floor during a meet against Arkansas in March 2008, Kupets tore her right Achilles tendon, the second such injury she had suffered in her career. She was out for the remainder of the season.

At the start of 2009, Kupets was named SEC Gymnast of the Week for the first four weeks of the season and won the all-around at seven straight meets. Against Alabama, she recorded a career-best 39.825 to win the all-around and scored perfect 10s on uneven bars and beam. At a home meet against Florida, she scored the first perfect 10 of her career on floor en route to winning the all-around with another career best of 39.850. Though Georgia faltered at the SEC Championships and suffered their only defeat of the season, Kupets again claimed the all-around title and was named SEC Gymnast of the Year. She led Georgia to a win at Regionals with a 10.00 on vault, giving her at least one 10 on each apparatus in the 2009 season.

At the 2009 NCAA Championships, Kupets became national all-around champion for a record-tying third time, earning a 10 on beam and defeating runner-up Kristina Baskett of Utah with a total score of 39.800. The next night, she helped Georgia win its fifth consecutive and tenth overall NCAA championship, posting a career-best 39.900. She scored perfect 10s on the uneven bars and vault, bringing her season total to seven and her career total to eight. In the individual event finals, she won the bars and beam titles (beating fellow Gym Dog and 2004 Olympic teammate Courtney McCool on beam), tied to win floor, and placed third on vault, setting an NCAA record of nine individual titles to end her college career.

Kupets is the first NCAA gymnast ever to win the all-around and every individual event. On June 22, 2009, she was awarded the Honda-Broderick Cup, which is given to the top female college athlete.

==== Career perfect 10.0 ====
Season	Date	Event	Meet
2007	February 10, 2007	Uneven Bars	Georgia va Alabama
2009	January 23, 2009	Balance Beam	Georgia vs Alabama
2009	January 23, 2009	Uneven Bars	Georgia vs Alabama
2009	February 28, 2009	Floor Exercise	Georgia vs Florida
2009	April 4, 2009	Vault	Regional Championships
2009	April 16, 2009	Balance Beam	NCAA Semi-finals
2009	April 17, 2009	Uneven Bars	NCAA Championships
2009	April 17, 2009	Vault	NCAA Championships

==== Floor music ====
- 2006 (NCAA): "Shake Break Bounce" by The Chemical Brothers

=== Competitive history ===
Year	Event	Team	AA	VT	UB	BB	FX
Junior
1999	USA-France Friendly	1st place, gold medalist(s)	2nd place, silver medalist(s)				1st place, gold medalist(s)
1999	USA-Canada Friendly	2nd place, silver medalist(s)		5		2nd place, silver medalist(s)	
1999	U.S. National Championships		8			4	
2000	American Classic		3rd place, bronze medalist(s)				
2000	Bluewater Int'l Invitational		1st place, gold medalist(s)	1st place, gold medalist(s)	1st place, gold medalist(s)	1st place, gold medalist(s)	1st place, gold medalist(s)
2001	Glasgow Grand Prix			4	4	6	7
2001	U.S. National Championships		9		5		4
Senior
2002	American Cup		2nd place, silver medalist(s)		2nd place, silver medalist(s)	3rd place, bronze medalist(s)	3rd place, bronze medalist(s)
2002	U.S. National Championships		8				
2002	Debrecen World Championships				1st place, gold medalist(s)		
2003	American Cup		2nd place, silver medalist(s)		1st place, gold medalist(s)	3rd place, bronze medalist(s)	2nd place, silver medalist(s)
2003	Pacific Challenge	1st place, gold medalist(s)	2nd place, silver medalist(s)		3rd place, bronze medalist(s)	4	1st place, gold medalist(s)
2003	U.S. Classic		1st place, gold medalist(s)	3rd place, bronze medalist(s)	4	1st place, gold medalist(s)	1st place, gold medalist(s)
2003	U.S. National Championships		1st place, gold medalist(s)		2nd place, silver medalist(s)	1st place, gold medalist(s)	4
2003	Anaheim World Championships	1st place, gold medalist(s)					
2004	Int'l Friendship Camp		1st place, gold medalist(s)				
2004	U.S. Classic				1st place, gold medalist(s)	2nd place, silver medalist(s)	
2004	U.S. National Championships		1st place, gold medalist(s)		2nd place, silver medalist(s)	1st place, gold medalist(s)	4
2004	Olympic Trials		1st place, gold medalist(s)		1st place, gold medalist(s)	2nd place, silver medalist(s)	
2004	Athens Olympic Games	2nd place, silver medalist(s)	9		3rd place, bronze medalist(s)	5	
NCAA
2006	NCAA Championships	1st place, gold medalist(s)	1st place, gold medalist(s)		1st place, gold medalist(s)	1st place, gold medalist(s)	2nd place, silver medalist(s)
2007	NCAA Championships	1st place, gold medalist(s)	1st place, gold medalist(s)	1st place, gold medalist(s)	2nd place, silver medalist(s)	3rd place, bronze medalist(s)	2nd place, silver medalist(s)
2008	NCAA Championships	1st place, gold medalist(s)					
2009	NCAA Championships	1st place, gold medalist(s)	1st place, gold medalist(s)	3rd place, bronze medalist(s)	1st place, gold medalist(s)	1st place, gold medalist(s)	1st place, gold medalist(s)

== Career after competitive gymnastics ==
Kupets joined the Las Vegas based dance and acrobatics show Le Reve in 2014. Kupets joined her husband, Chris Carter, and sister Ashley as a performer in the show. In July 2016, Kupets began coaching full-time at Oconee Gymnastics & Cheer. Also in 2016, Kupets appeared on NBC's digital program, The Daily Dismount, as a gymnastics commentator for NBC's Olympic coverage. She was named head coach of University of Georgia's women's gymnastics team in May 2017. She was let go from the position at the conclusion of the 2024 season.

== Personal life ==
She is distantly related to the 1947 Heisman Trophy winner Johnny Lujack. She also is cousins with current Pittsburgh Steelers wide receiver Ben Skowronek. Former NFL quarterback Trent Green is related by marriage. She married Chris Carter, a former acrobatic gymnast for Great Britain, in 2014. The couple have three daughters, Brooklyn, Savannah, and Charlotte, and a son Bentley together.
