= 2009 NCAA women's gymnastics championships =

American college gymnastics competition

2009 NCAA Women's Gymnastics Championships
- Venue: Bob Devaney Sports Center
- Location: Lincoln, Nebraska
- Dates: April 16–18

Medalists
gold medal	Georgia
silver medal	Alabama
bronze medal	Utah

The 2009 NCAA Women's Gymnastics championship involved 12 schools competing for the national championship of women's NCAA Division I gymnastics. It was the twenty eighth NCAA gymnastics national championship and the defending NCAA Team Champion for 2008 was Georgia. The Competition took place in Lincoln, Nebraska hosted by the University of Nebraska–Lincoln in the Bob Devaney Sports Center.

The 2009 six regional fields and sites were as follows:

- North Central Regional (Carver-Hawkeye Arena, Iowa City, Iowa, Host: University of Iowa) - No. 6 Florida, No. 7 UCLA, No. 18 Minnesota, No. 20 Denver, No. 23 Iowa State, No. 28 Iowa; Saturday, April 4 at 6 p.m. CT
- Central Regional (St. John Arena, Columbus, Ohio, Host: Ohio State University) - No. 5 LSU, No. 8 Oregon State, No. 17 Ohio State, No. 22 Kent State, No. 24 Kentucky, No. 26 Michigan State; Saturday, April 4
- Northeast Regional (Coleman Coliseum, Tuscaloosa, Alabama, Host: University of Alabama, Tuscaloosa) - No. 3 Alabama, No. 9 Oklahoma, No. 15 Missouri, No. 32 Central Michigan, No. 35 New Hampshire, No. 35 Maryland; Saturday, April 4
- South Central Regional (Barnhill Arena, Fayetteville, Arkansas, Host: University of Arkansas, Fayetteville) - No. 4 Stanford, No. 10 Arkansas, No. 16 Michigan, No. 25 Arizona, No. 31 Arizona State, No. 27 Southern Utah; Saturday, April 4
- Southeast Regional (Reynolds Coliseum, Raleigh, North Carolina, Host: North Carolina State University) - No. 1 Georgia, No. 12 Penn State, No. 13 Nebraska, No. 21 West Virginia, No. 29 North Carolina State, No. 30 North Carolina; Saturday, April 4
- West Regional (Bank of America Arena, Seattle, Washington, Host: University of Washington) - No. 2 Utah, No. 11 Auburn, No. 14 Illinois, No. 19 Boise State, No. 33 Washington, No. 34 San Jose State; Saturday, April 4 at 6 p.m. PT
- NCAA Championships, the Bob Devaney Sports Center, Lincoln, Nebraska (Host: University of Nebraska–Lincoln), on April 16–18.

At the national championships at Lincoln, Nebraska, the top three teams from each of the first day's sessions advancing to the Super Six Team Finals were: Georgia, Florida and LSU (first session); Alabama, Arkansas and Utah (second session). Utah used a tie breaker over UCLA to advance to the finals. Individually, top all-around title went to Georgia's Courtney Kupets who scored 39.80 points, including a perfect 10 on balance beam. Utah's Kristina Basket with 39.60 points and UCLA's Vanessa Zamarripa with 39.575 points were second and third-place finishers. Kupets became just the second three-time NCAA All-Around champion in NCAA history. Additionally, other gymnasts competing were 12 of the nation’s best all-around and four individual event specialists.

The Georgia Gym Dogs finished on top with 197.825 points to win the 2009 team championship, a record 10th NCAA title. They were followed by Alabama with 197.575 points, Utah with 197.425 points, Florida with 196.725 points, Arkansas with 196.475 points and LSU with 196.375 points at the Super Six Team Finals.

Head coach Suzanne Yoculan, in her 26th year at the helm of the University of Georgia program, retired with a record of 831-117-7 after the 2009 championship.

== Champions ==
Event	Gold	Silver	Bronze
Team	Georgia Gym Dogs; Mariel Box; Paige Burns; Kat Ding; Lauren Johnson; Courtney Kupets; Hilary Mauro; Cassidy McComb; Courtney McCool; Marcia Newby; Gina Nuccio; Lauren Sessler; Abby Stack; Grace Taylor; Tiffany Tolnay; Amber Trani	Alabama Crimson Tide; Alyssa Chapman; Morgan Dennis; Jocelyn Fowler; Kayla Hoffman; Ricki Lebegern; Brittany Magee; Megan Mashburn; Ashley O'Neal; Casey Overton; Erika Pearson; Kassi Price; Ashley Priess; Jacqueline Shealy; Geralen Stack-Eaton; Caitlin Sullivan; Rachel Terry	Utah Red Rocks; Kristina Baskett; Cortni Beers; Daria Bijak; Jamie Deetscreek; Annie DiLuzio; Jacquelyn Johnson; Nina Kim; Gael Mackie; Stephanie McAllister; Beth Rizzo; Kyndal Robarts
All-Around	Courtney Kupets (Georgia)	Kristina Baskett (Utah)	Vanessa Zamarripa (UCLA)
Vault	Ashleigh Clare-Kearney (LSU)	Susan Jackson (LSU)	Courtney Kupets (Georgia), Kristina Baskett (Utah)
Uneven Bars	Courtney Kupets (Georgia)	Carly Janiga (Stanford)	Alicia Goodwin (Florida), Kristina Baskett (Utah)
Balance Beam	Courtney Kupets (Georgia)	Courtney McCool (Georgia)	Ashley Priess (Alabama), Sarah Nagashima (Arkansas), Kristina Baskett (Utah)
Floor Exercise	Courtney Kupets (Georgia), Ashleigh Clare-Kearny (LSU)	Corey Hartung (Florida)	Brandi Personett (Penn State)

== Team Results ==
=== Session 1 ===
Position	Team	Vault (gymnastics)	Uneven bars	Balance beam	Floor (gymnastics)	Total
1	Georgia Gym Dogs	49.300	49.375	49.550	49.225	197.450
2	Florida Gators	48.900	49.150	49.275	49.050	196.375
3	LSU Tigers	49.450	49.125	48.525	49.200	196.300
4	Stanford Cardinal	49.125	49.175	48.975	48.950	196.225
5	Penn State Nittany Lions	49.100	49.050	48.900	49.025	196.100
6	Oklahoma Sooners	49.050	48.675	49.125	48.975	195.825

=== Session 2 ===
Position	Team	Vault (gymnastics)	Uneven bars	Balance beam	Floor (gymnastics)	Total
1	Alabama Crimson Tide	49.345	49.200	49.375	49.125	197.025
2	Arkansas Razorbacks	48.450	49.100	49.250	49.150	196.950
3	Utah Red Rocks	49.400	49.275	48.775	49.175	196.625
3	UCLA Bruins	49.425	48.700	49.200	49.300	196.625
5	Oregon State Beavers	49.225	48.625	48.325	49.175	195.350
6	Illinois Fightin' Illini	48.700	48.875	48.575	48.900	195.050

=== Super Six ===
Position	Team	Vault (gymnastics)	Uneven bars	Balance beam	Floor (gymnastics)	Total
1	Georgia Gym Dogs	49.625	49.425	49.200	49.575	197.825
2	Alabama Crimson Tide	49.425	49.325	49.325	49.500	197.575
3	Utah Red Rocks	49.525	49.275	49.175	49.450	197.425
4	Florida Gators	49.000	49.150	49.200	48.375	196.725
5	Arkansas Razorbacks	49.325	48.975	48.925	49.250	196.475
6	LSU Tigers	49.275	49.100	48.700	49.300	196.375

== Top Ten Individual All-Around Results ==
Position	Gymnast	Team	Vault (gymnastics)	Uneven bars	Balance beam	Floor (gymnastics)	Total
1	Courtney Kupets	Georgia	9.900	9.950	10.000	9.950	39.800
2	Kristina Baskett	Utah	9.950	9.900	9.900	9.850	39.600
3	Vanessa Zamarippa	UCLA	9.950	9.850	9.900	9.875	39.575
4	Michelle Stout	Arkansas	9.975	9.875	9.825	9.850	39.525
4	Ariana Berlin	UCLA	9.900	9.900	9.875	9.850	39.525
6	Tiffany Tolnay	Georgia	9.925	9.800	9.875	9.900	39.500
7	Elise Hopfner-Hibbs	UCLA	9.900	9.850	9.875	9.850	39.475
8	Maranda Smith	Florida	9.900	9.850	9.850	9.850	39.450
8	Ricki Lebegern	Alabama	9.875	9.825	9.900	9.850	39.450
8	Ashley Priess	Alabama	9.800	9.900	9.900	9.850	39.450

== Individual Event Finals Results ==
=== Vault ===
Rank	Name	Team	Vault Average
1	Ashleigh Clare-Kearny	LSU	9.9000
2	Susan Jackson	LSU	9.8938
3	Courtney Kupets	Georgia	9.8563
3	Kristina Baskett	Utah	9.8563
5	Michelle Stout	Arkansas	9.8375
6	Jessica Lopez	Denver	9.8313
7	Mandi Rodriguez	Oregon State	9.7875
8	Whitney Bencsko	Penn State	9.7813
8	Vanessa Zamarippa	UCLA	9.7813
10	Staci Schwitkis	LSU	9.6813
11	Sarah Shire	Missouri	9.5000
12	Maranda Smith	Florida	8.4063

=== Uneven Bars ===
Rank	Name	Team	Score
1	Courtney Kupets	Georgia	9.9500
2	Carly Janiga	Stanford	9.9125
3	Alicia Goodwin	Florida	9.9000
3	Kristina Baskett	Utah	9.9000
5	Ariana Berlin	UCLA	9.8875
5	Kat Ding	Georgia	9.8875
7	Michelle Stout	Arkansas	9.8625
7	Melanie Sinclair	Florida	9.8625
9	Ashleigh Clare-Kearney	LSU	9.8500
10	Morgan Dennis	Alabama	9.8125
10	Nicole Ourada	Stanford	9.8125
12	Ashley Priess	Alabama	9.8000
13	Alexandra Brockway	Penn State	9.7875
13	Elise Wheeler	Southern Utah	9.7875
15	Grace Taylor	Georgia	9.4625
16	Summer Hubbard	LSU	9.0500

=== Balance Beam ===
Rank	Name	Team	Score
1	Courtney Kupets	Georgia	9.9875
2	Courtney McCool	Georgia	9.9500
3	Ashley Priess	Alabama	9.9000
3	Sarah Nagashima	Arkansas	9.9000
3	Kristina Baskett	Utah	9.9000
6	Elise Wheeler	Southern Utah	9.8750
7	Megan Ferguson	Oklahoma	9.8375
7	Melissa Fernandez	Illinois	9.8375
9	Alex LaChance	Arkansas	9.8250
10	Ricki Lebegern	Alabama	9.8000
11	Vanessa Zamarippa	UCLA	9.7625

=== Floor Exercise ===
Rank	Name	Team	Score
1	Courtney Kupets	Georgia	9.9500
1	Ashleigh Clare-Kearney	LSU	9.9500
3	Corey Hartung	Florida	9.9000
4	Brandi Personett	Penn State	9.8875
5	Daria Bijak	Utah	9.8750
6	Mandi Rodriguez	Oregon State	9.8625
6	Vanessa Zamarippa	UCLA	9.8625
7	Brittani McCullough	UCLA	9.8500
9	Kylee Botterman	Michigan	9.7000
