= Grace Taylor =

Grace Taylor may refer to:

- Grace Dyer Taylor (1859–1867)
- Grace Oladunni Taylor (born 1937), biochemist
- Grace Taylor (poet) (born c. 1984), New Zealand poet
- Grace Taylor (gymnast) (born 1988), American gymnast
