= 2007 NCAA women's gymnastics championships =

American college gymnastics competition

- Venue: Jon M. Huntsman Center
- Location: Salt Lake City, Utah
- Dates: April 26–28, 2007
- Teams: 12

Champions
- Women: Courtney Kupets, Georgia (39.750)
- Team: Georgia (8th)

The 2007 NCAA women's gymnastics championships were contested at the 26th annual tournament hosted by the NCAA to determine the individual and team national champions of women's gymnastics among its member programs in the United States.

The competition took place April 26–28 in Salt Lake City, Utah, hosted by the University of Utah in the Jon M. Huntsman Center.

Two-time defending champions Georgia won the team championship, the Gym Dogs' eighth all-time.

Courtney Kupets, also from Georgia, again won the individual all-around championship, successfully defending her 2006 title.

== Champions ==
Event	Gold	Silver	Bronze
Team	Georgia Gym Dogs; Audrey Bowers; Paige Burns; Nikki Childs; Adrienne Dishman; Megan Dowlen; Kelsey Ericksen; Christi Fortunato; Katie Heenan; Lauren Johnson; Ashley Kupets; Courtney Kupets; Courtney McCool; Marcia Newby; Lauren Sessler; Linda Stack; Grace Taylor; Tiffany Tolnay	Utah Red Rocks; Kristina Baskett; Daria Bijak; Chelsey Coleman; Jamie Deetscreek; Annie DiLuzio; Jessica Duke; Nicolle Ford; Nina Kim; Katie Kivisto; Stephanie Neff; Ashley Postell; Beth Rizzo; Sarah Shire	Florida Gators; Amanda Castillo; Savannah Evans; Courtney Gladys; Corey Hartung; Ashley Kerr; Breanne King; Samantha Lutz; Tiffany Murry; Ashley Reed; Katie Rue; Melanie Sinclair; Chantelle Tousek; Nicola Willis; Rebekah Zaiser
All-Around	Courtney Kupets (Georgia)	Ashley Postell (Utah)	Amanda Castillo (Florida)
Vault	Courtney Kupets (Georgia)	Annie DiLuzio (Utah)	Emily Parsons (Nebraska); Brittney Koncak-Schumann (Oklahoma)
Uneven Bars	Terin Humphrey (Alabama)	Tasha Schwikert (UCLA); Courtney Kupets (Georgia)	Kristina Baskett (Utah)
Balance Beam	Ashley Postell (Utah)	Grace Taylor (Georgia)	Amanda Castillo (Florida); Corey Hartung (Florida); Nicole Ourada (Stanford); Courtney Kupets (Georgia)
Floor Exercise	Morgan Dennis (Alabama)	Courtney Kupets (Georgia)	Ashley Postell (Utah)

== See also ==
- 2007 NCAA men's gymnastics championships
