= 2008 NCAA women's gymnastics championships =

American college gymnastics competition

2008 NCAA Women's Gymnastics Championships
- Venue: Stegeman Coliseum
- Location: Athens, Georgia
- Dates: April 16–18

Medalists
gold medal	Georgia
silver medal	Utah
bronze medal	Stanford

The 2008 NCAA Women's Gymnastics championship involved 12 schools competing for the national championship of women's NCAA Division I gymnastics. It was the twenty seventh NCAA gymnastics national championship and the defending NCAA Team Champion for 2007 was Georgia. The Competition took place in Athens, Georgia hosted by the University of Georgia in Stegeman Coliseum. The 2008 Championship was won by Georgia, their fourth in a row.

== Champions ==
Event	Gold	Silver	Bronze
Team	Georgia Gym Dogs; Audrey Bowers; Paige Burns; Nikki Childs; Megan Dowlen; Christi Fortunato; Katie Heenan; Lauren Johnson; Courtney Kupets; Hilary Mauro; Cassidy McComb; Courtney McCool; Marcia Newby; Lauren Sessler; Abby Stack; Grace Taylor; Tiffany Tolnay	Utah Red Rocks; Kristina Baskett; Daria Bijak; Jamie Deetscreek; Jessica Duke; Jacquelyn Johnson; Nina Kim; Katie Kivisto; Gael Mackie; Stephanie Neff; Ashley Postell; Beth Rizzo; Kyndal Robarts	Stanford Cardinal; Shelley Alexander; Stephanie Carter; Lauren Elmore; Kelly Free; Stephanie Gentry; Danielle Ikoma; Allyse Ishino; Carly Janiga; Gretchen O'Henley; Nicole Ourada; Alex Pintchoulk; Aimee Precourt; Heather Purnell; Blair Ryland; Liz Tricase; Tenaya West; Tabitha Yim
All-Around	Tasha Schwikert (UCLA)	Ashley Postell (Utah)	Melanie Sinclair (Florida) Katie Heenan (Georgia) Tiffany Tolnay (Georgia) Kristina Baskett (Utah)
Vault	Susan Jackson (LSU)	Kristina Baskett (Utah) Julie Dwyer (Auburn)	Michelle Stout (Arkansas)
Uneven Bars	Tasha Schwikert (UCLA)	Katie Heenan (Georgia) Kristina Comforte (UCLA)	Nikki Childs (Georgia) Ashleigh Clare-Kearney (LSU)
Balance Beam	Grace Taylor (Georgia)	Ashley Postell (Utah)	Emily Parsons (Nebraska)
Floor Exercise	Courtney McCool (Georgia)	Tasha Schwikert (UCLA)	Nicole Willis (Florida)
