= Pacific Rim Championships – Women's floor =

Three medals are awarded: gold for first place, silver for second place, and bronze for third place. Tie breakers have not been used in every year. In the event of a tie between two gymnasts, both names are listed, and the following position (second for a tie for first, third for a tie for second) is left empty because a medal was not awarded for that position. If three gymnastics tied for a position, the following two positions are left empty.

== Medalists ==
Year	Location	Gold	Silver	Bronze	Ref.
1998	(Canada) Winnipeg	(United States) Vanessa Atler	(Australia) Zeena McLaughlin	(Canada) Katie Rowland	
2000	(New Zealand) Christchurch	(United States) Elise Ray	(United States) Morgan White	(Japan) Naoko Nakase	
2002	(Canada) Vancouver	(United States) Tasha Schwikert	(Australia) Allana Slater	(Canada) Heather Purnell	
2004	(United States) Honolulu	(United States) Carly Patterson	(United States) Allyse Ishino	(Canada) Kylie Stone	
2006	(United States) Honolulu	(United States) Jana Bieger	(United States) Chellsie Memmel	(Canada) Elyse Hopfner-Hibbs	
2008	(United States) San Jose	(United States) Darlene Hill	(Australia) Daria Joura	(Russia) Anna Myzdrikova	
2010	(Australia) Melbourne	(United States) Rebecca Bross	(United States) Aly Raisman	(Canada) Kristina Vaculik	
2012	(United States) Everett	(United States) Jordyn Wieber	(Canada) Peng-Peng Lee	(United States) Kyla Ross	
2014	(Canada) Richmond	(United States) Elizabeth Price	(United States) Kyla Ross	(Canada) Aleeza Yu	
2016	(United States) Everett	(United States) Aly Raisman	(United States) Brenna Dowell	(Canada) Shallon Olsen	
2018	(Colombia) Medellín	(United States) Jordan Chiles	(United States) Grace McCallum	(Canada) Haley de Jong	
2024	(Colombia) Cali	(United States) Simone Rose	(United States) Jayla Hang	(Canada) Maddison Hajjar	
