= Arkansas Razorbacks gymnastics =

American college gymnastics team

- Founded: 2003; 23 years ago
- University: University of Arkansas
- Head coach: Chris Brooks (1st season)
- Conference: SEC
- Location: Fayetteville, Arkansas
- Home arena: Bud Walton Arena (Capacity: 19,200)
- Nickname: Gym'Backs
- Colors: Cardinal and white

Super Six appearances
- 2009, 2012

NCAA Regional championships
- 2009, 2011

NCAA Tournament appearances
- 2006, 2008, 2009, 2010, 2011, 2012, 2013, 2018, 2024, 2026

The Arkansas Razorbacks gymnastics team represents the University of Arkansas and competes in the Southeastern Conference (SEC). The team was founded in 2003 and is currently coached by Chris Brooks, after he assumed the position in April 2026.

== History ==
The gymnastics team was founded in 2003 by Mark Cook, who started building the team in 2001. Cook had previously coached the Stanford gymnastics and UCLA Bruins teams, as the head coach and assistant coach respectively. The first team competed in the 2003, with an all-freshman roster, and finished the regular season ranked 41st.

The team made their first appearance at the NCAA National Championship finals ('Super Six') in 2009, finishing in 5th place with a score of 196.475 - their best placement to date. The Razorbacks made their second appearance in 2012, finishing in 6th place with a score of 196.300.

The retirement of Mark Cook as head coach was announced on April 9, 2019. The new head coach for the 2019-2020 season was announced to be the 2011 World Champion Jordyn Wieber on April 24 - the first Olympic champion to be the head coach of an NCAA gymnastics team. Wieber was previously a volunteer assistant coach at UCLA, at which she coached floor, which UCLA finished the 2018 and 2019 regular seasons ranked No. 1 in the country.

In 2024, the Razorbacks qualified to the national championships, finishing in 7th place; Reese Drotar was awarded first-team All-American honours on the uneven bars, and Leah Smith earned second team All-American honours on vault.

At the conclusion of the 2026 season, Wieber announced that she was stepping down as head coach in order "to focus on [her] family and other passions". Her husband, Chris Brooks, took over the head coach position after serving as an assistant coach during her tenure.

== Championships ==
=== Super Six Appearances ===
Arkansas Razorbacks Super Six Appearances
Year	Finish
2009	5th
2012	6th

=== Individual champions ===
NCAA: Arkansas Individual Champions
Name	Year	Event
Katherine Grable	2014	VT
Katherine Grable	2014	FX

SEC: Arkansas Individual Champions
Name	Year	Event
Casey Jo Magee	2009	BB
Jaime Pisani	2012	FX

== Current roster ==
Name	Height	Year	Hometown
Noelle Adams		SR	Mesa, AZ
Kaia Bochow		R-SR	Golden, CO
Simone Brown		FR	Lake Wylie, SC
Bradley Burton		SO	Houston, TX
Avalon Campbell		SO	Oceanside, CA
Allison Cucci		SO	Rochester, NY
Giselle Guenther		FR	Cincinnati, OH
Madison Gustitus		JR	Chicago, IL
Tori Hess		FR	Mansfield, MA
Riley Jandorf		SO	Bentonville, AR
Avery King		SO	Dallas, TX
Hailey Klein	5-2	SR	Lake Forest, IL
Nyla Morabito		SR	Welland, ON
Priscilla Park	5-3	SR	Atlanta, GA
Finley Scott		FR	Houston, TX
Raquel Simmons		FR	
Emma Slevin		SR	Galway, Ireland
Sabrina Visconti		FR	Revere, MA
Lauren Williams	5-3	R-SR	Rogers, AR

== Coaches ==
=== Head coaches ===
Name	Years	Record	Win %
Mark Cook	2003 – 2019	205–270–5	.432
Jordyn Wieber	2020 – 2026	62–101–2	.382
Chris Brooks	2027 – present		

=== Coaches for the current season ===
Name	Position	Alma Mater
Chris Brooks	Head coach	Oklahoma
Kyla Ross	Associate head coach	UCLA
Catelyn Branson	Associate head coach	Nebraska
Zan Jones	Assistant coach	Alabama

== Past Olympians ==
- Joscelyn Roberson (2024 alternate)
