= Parkettes National Gymnastics Training Center =

Gymnastics club in Allentown, Pennsylvania

Coordinates: 40.60050°N 75.46361°W

- Nickname: Parkettes
- Founded: 1968
- Location: Allentown, Pennsylvania, U.S.
- Key people: Bill Strauss; Donna Strauss; Jeff Bell
- Website: parkettes.com

Parkettes National Gymnastics Training Center, widely known as Parkettes, is a gymnastics club located in Allentown, Pennsylvania. It has produced several teams and individual gymnasts representing the United States, Puerto Rico, the Czech Republic, and Canada in international meets, including the Olympic Games.

== History ==
=== 20th century ===
Parkettes was founded by Bill Strauss and his wife, Donna Strauss. It started as a backyard after-school workout program at the Strauss home. It was later in a barn, school, and church basement as they got the program established. Former Mack Trucks CEO Alfred Pelletier helped the program move to a permanent home.

The first Olympian produced by the club was Jody Yocum, who was named as an alternate for the 1976 Summer Olympics.

- In 1986, three Parkettes' gymnasts placed at the USA Gymnastics National Championships. Jennifer Sey won the competition, Hope Spivey came in second, and Alyssa Solomon came in fourth.
- In 1988, Parkettes-trained gymnast Hope Spivey represented the United States at the 1988 Summer Olympics in Seoul.
- In 1992, Parkettes' gymnast Kim Kelly was selected for the 1992 Summer Olympics gymnastics training squad.
- In 1998 and 1999, Kristen Maloney won the United States National Senior All-Around gold medal. In 2000, she competed at the 2000 Olympic Games in Sydney, where she won the bronze medal.
- In 1999, 2000, and again in 2001, Kristal Uzelac won the United States Junior National All-Around gold.

== 21st century ==
- In 2002, Vanessa Meloche, a Canadian gymnast at Parkettes, finished third at the Canadian championships and first on the uneven bars.
- In 2012, Elizabeth Price was named as an alternate for the 2012 Olympic Games in London.
- In 2016, David Jessen represented the Czech Republic at the 2016 Olympic Games in Rio de Janeiro.
- Parkettes 50th anniversary was in the summer of 2018.
- In 2019, coach John Holman was accused of sexual misconduct by a former gymnast.
- In 2022, 11 Parkettes' gymnasts made misconduct complaints to the U.S. Center for SafeSport that resulted in an ongoing investigation of five Parkettes coaches.
- In July, 2025, two coaches, including Holman, were barred from coaching by the U.S. Center for SafeSport and placed in the Centralized Disciplinary Database.
- In November 2025, Jeff Bell was appointed the executive director of Parkettes, following the retirement of Bill and Donna Strauss.

== Competitions ==
=== Brian Babcock Invitational ===
The Brian Babcock Invitational (known colloquially as the BBI) is an annual men’s developmental program gymnastics competition hosted by the Parkettes’ men’s program. Established in 1975 as the Parkettes Boys Invitational, it was renamed in 1999 to honor the memory of Brian Babcock, former Boys Program Head Coach, who had passed away the previous year from complications of a procedure to treat myelodysplasia.

=== Parkettes Invitational ===
The Parkettes Invitational (known colloquially as the PKI) is an annual women’s developmental program gymnastics competition hosted by the Parkettes’ women’s program.

=== Rocking the House of Strauss ===
Rocking the House of Strauss is an annual developmental program invitational first hosted by the Parkette’s women’s team in 2024.

== Women's program ==
The Parkette’s women’s program began in the backyard of Bill and Donna Strauss in 1968. In the following years, it was moved several times as the program expanded, until it was moved into its current facility in 1981, with the help of Mack Trucks CEO, Alfred Pelletier. In the following decades, the program has produced several Olympians and numerous NCAA gymnasts. Famous gymnasts who have trained on the Parkettes women’s team include Christina Desiderio, Vanessa Meloche, Margzetta Frazier, Emjae Frazier, Kristen Maloney, Elizabeth Price, Jennifer Sey, Hope Spivey and Kristal Uzelac. The women's program has been run since its inception by the Strauss family, with the program currently being run by the daughter of Bill and Donna Strauss, Tricia Scott. Coaches on the team include Sherri Portalatin, whose daughter Allanah is a two-time Puerto Rican national team member, and is committed to San Jose State University.

== Men's program ==
While the majority of Parkettes' operation centers around women’s gymnastics, it operates one of the most successful men’s programs in the state of Pennsylvania. It has won the PA State Super Team trophy 16 times, the highest team award in the state of Pennsylvania, and has produced numerous collegiate athletes at the NCAA and GymACT levels. Under the leadership of Joe Stallone, who was the head coach of the boys team from 1995-2018, the program produced several notable gymnasts, including NCAA gymnasts Alex Frack, Sean Senters, Colin Coates and Austin Zalik, among many others. Stallone also coached decorated special olympian Michael Gaal, who competed at two Special Olympics World Games, and was inducted into both the Special Olympics Pennsylvania Hall of Fame and the Bethlehem Special Olympics Hall of Fame.

The men's team was run by Kevin Hallinan between June 2024 and June 2026. He competed for Temple University from 1999-2004, and has over thirty years of coaching experience. Coaches also include Gheorghe Petchu and Vasili Vinahradau, who are both highly accomplished coaches, nationally and internationally. Vinahradau coached Olympic gymnast David Jessen, who represented the Czech Republic at the 2016 Olympics.

== Media coverage ==
In 2003, CNN aired a documentary, Achieving the Perfect 10, which contained some criticisms of the demanding and competitive nature of Parkettes's training program. In 2008, Jennifer Sey, the 1986 National Champion from Parkettes, published a book, Chalked Up, which was critical of Parkettes and elite gymnastics.

== Misconduct and SafeSport violations ==
In 2018, during the trial of Larry Nassar, convicted serial sex offender and former USAG women's national team doctor between 1996-2014, Parkettes founder Donna Strauss voiced her support for Nassar, cast doubt upon Nassar's victims, and said that she was ready to vouch for him. After the number of Nassar's accusers began to grow, her husband and co-founder, Bill Strauss, told her to "knock it off". According to Strauss, following Nassar's victims coming forward, she reached out to her former gymnasts who came into contact with him, and none claimed abuse at his hands. Former Parkettes gymnast Krystal Uzelac, who was treated by Nassar when she was sixteen for a broken toe, said that he had not abused her, though she is supportive of his victims. Later that year, Jessica Armstrong, a former US National team member and gymnast at Parkettes, said that she was sexually abused by her coach Tom Burdash in the early 1980s. This coach had not worked at Parkettes since the 1980s at the time of the accusations. Burdash was later registered as a sex offender in the state of Kentucky and placed on USA Gymnastics' list of permanently ineligible coaches. Armstrong, who serves as associate general counsel at St. Luke's University Health Network, helped to write the legislation that created the U.S. Center for SafeSport.

In 2019, coach John Holman, who had been with Parkettes for over 40 years, was suspended by SafeSport and USA Gymnastics, for violating Bylaws 9.3 and 10.5. These Bylaws pertain to various forms of sexual misconduct and the reporting of such incidents, as well as SafeSport's ability to enact interim measures during the course of the investigation. In a statement made by Parkettes' attorney, the accusations were related to "inappropriate stretching, inappropriate contact and inappropriate comments" made between 1993 and 1994. Holman's suspension allowed him to continue coaching under the condition that he has "no unsupervised contact with minors". According to the organization's attorney, if the allegations had involved "serious conduct", harsher restrictions would have been placed on Holman during the investigation, as unsupervised contact with minors is already banned under SafeSport guidelines. During a following investigation into Holman, his attorney stated that there had been nothing to suggest that Holman had been guilty of misconduct with regard to the 2019 case.

Sometime in 2021, former coach Larry Moyer, who had worked at Parkettes in the 1980s, was banned by SafeSport and USAG following 2019 allegations of sexual abuse.

In 2022, Holman, both Bill and Donna Strauss, and two other coaches were accused by 11 former Parkettes gymnasts of verbal abuse, body shaming, starving them during practice, forcing them to train on injuries, and sexual harassment. According to the allegations, the abuse occurred between 2013-2016, and was carried out by Holman, as well as coaches Robin Netwall and Heather Moroz, and facilitated by the Strausses. Additionally, four gymnasts accused Holman of sexual harassment. Following an investigation by SafeSport, in 2025 Netwall and Holman were banned from the sport, with Holman's being a permanent ban. Soon after this, Bill and Donna Strauss retired from Parkettes.

== Notable gymnasts and alumni ==
- Christina Desiderio
- Margzetta Frazier
- Emjae Frazier
- Kristen Maloney
- Vanessa Meloche
- Elizabeth Price
- Jennifer Sey
- Hope Spivey
- Kristal Uzelac
- David Jessen
- Gina Stallone
- Michael Gaal

== Notable coaches ==
- Brian Babcock, 1985 USA Gymnastics National Championships winner, former Parkettes Men’s Program Director 1989-1995
- Donna Strauss, Parkettes co-founder
- Natalia Yurchenko, Soviet gymnast and 1983 World championships gold medal winner
- Joe Stallone - Former NCAA Gymnast for Penn State, Boys Program director 1995-2018
