= 2012 NCAA women's gymnastics championships =

American college gymnastics competition

2012 NCAA Women's Gymnastics Championships
- Venue: Gwinnett Center
- Location: Duluth, Georgia
- Dates: April 20–22

Medalists
gold medal	Alabama
silver medal	Florida
bronze medal	UCLA

The 2012 NCAA Women's Gymnastics Championship were held in the Gwinnett Center, at Duluth, Georgia on April 20–22, 2012. Twelve teams from the six regional meets advanced to the NCAA Division I national team and individual titles.

== Regional Championships ==
Regional Championships were held on April 7, 2012 at the following six sites:

- Auburn Regional (at Auburn), 6 p.m. CT
  - Finish: Georgia (1st), Oregon State (2nd), Michigan, Auburn, West Virginia, Michigan State
- Champaign Regional (at Illinois), 4 p.m. CT
  - Finish: Oklahoma (1st), Stanford (2nd), Illinois, Denver, Kentucky, Illinois-Chicago
- Fayetteville Regional (at Arkansas), 4 p.m. CT
  - Finish: UCLA (1st), Arkansas (2nd), Boise St., Missouri, Maryland, New Hampshire
- Raleigh Regional (at North Carolina State), 4 p.m. ET
  - Finish: Florida (1st), Ohio State (2nd), North Carolina State, Penn State, North Carolina, Kent State
- Salt Lake City Regional (at Utah), 6 p.m. MT
  - Finish: Utah (1st), Nebraska (2nd), Minnesota, Arizona State, San Jose State, Iowa State
- Seattle Regional (at Washington), 4 p.m. PT
  - Finish: Alabama (1st), LSU (2nd), Washington, Arizona, Iowa, Central Michigan

== NCAA Women's Gymnastics Championship ==
NCAA Women's Gymnastics Championship:

- NCAA Championships, April 20:

Top two teams from each regional.

  - Afternoon session at Noon ET: 1st UCLA (197.400), 2nd Utah (197.200), 3rd Stanford (197.125), 4th Oklahoma (196.925), 5th Nebraska (196.625), 6th LSU (196.550)
  - Evening session at 6 pm ET: 1st Alabama (197.675), 2nd Florida (197.650), 3rd Arkansas (197.150), 4th Ohio State (196.525), 5th Georgia, (196.500), 6th Oregon State (196.475)

Final six teams (top three teams from Friday's sessions).

- Super six teams:
  - UCLA, Utah, Stanford, Alabama, Florida, Arkansas
- Individual Event Finals – Duluth, Georgia, Saturday, April 22 (1 p.m.):
  - Vault – 1st Kytra Hunter, Florida (9.8750 ); 2nd Diandra Milliner, Alabama (9.8250); 3rd Kat Ding, Georgia (9.8125)
  - Uneven Parallel Bars – 1st Kat Ding, Georgia (9.9875); 2nd Sami Shapiro, Stanford (9.9000); 3rd Olivia Courtney, UCLA (9.8875)
  - Balance Beam – 1st Geralen Stack-Eaton, Alabama (9.9375), 2nd Megan Ferguson, Oklahoma (9.9250); 3rd Katie Matusik, Arizona (9.8875)
  - Floor Exercise – 1st Kat Ding (9.9500); 2nd Geralen Stack-Eaton, Alabama (9.9375); 2nd Elyse Hopfner-Hibbs, UCLA (9.9375)
  - All Around – Kytra Hunter, Florida, 39.725

== Champions ==
Event	Gold	Silver	Bronze
Team	Alabama Crimson Tide; Becca Alexin; Olivia Carisella; Kaitlyn Clark; Sarah DeMeo; Hunter Dennis; Ria Domier; Lindsey Fowler; Lore Leigh Frost; Marissa Gutierrez; Kim Jacob; Diandra Milliner; Brooke Parker; Ashley Priess; Ashley Sledge; Geralen Stack-Eaton; Rachel Terry; Hannah Toussaint; Kayla Williams	Florida Gators; Brittany Arlington; Mackenzie Caquatto; Ashanée Dickerson; Nicole Ellis; Amy Ferguson; Kytra Hunter; Alaina Johnson; Marissa King; Dali Lemezan; Elizabeth Mahlich; Lauren Rose; Jamie Shisler; Rachel Spicer; Randy Stageberg; Kiersten Wang; Jade Wiggins	UCLA Bruins; Kaelie Baer; Sadiqua Bynum; Olivia Courtney; Ellette Craddock; Monique De La Torre; Tauny Frattone; Aisha Gerber; Elyse Hopfner-Hibbs; Tiffany Hyland; Kassidy Kozai; Mattie Larson; Ti Liu; Dana McDonald; Sam Peszek; Alyssa Pritchett; Sydney Sawa; Cassie Whitcomb; Lichelle Wong; Vanessa Zamarripa
All-Around	Kytra Hunter (Florida)	Kat Ding (Georgia)	Jaime Pisani (Arkansas)
Vault	Kytra Hunter (Florida)	Diandra Milliner (Alabama)	Kat Ding (Georgia)
Uneven Bars	Kat Ding (Georgia)	Sami Shapiro (Stanford)	Olivia Courtney (UCLA)
Balance Beam	Geralen Stack-Eaton (Alabama)	Megan Ferguson (Oklahoma)	Katie Matusik (Arizona)
Floor Exercise	Kat Ding (Georgia)	Geralen Stack-Eaton (Alabama), Elyse Hopfner-Hibbs (UCLA)	Kytra Hunter (Florida), Melanie Jones (Oregon State)

== Team Results ==
=== Super Six ===
Position	Team	Vault (gymnastics)	Uneven bars	Balance beam	Floor (gymnastics)	Total
1	Alabama Crimson Tide	49.625	49.275	49.500	49.450	197.850
2	Florida Gators	49.475	49.425	49.475	49.400	197.775
3	UCLA Bruins	49.525	49.475	49.400	49.350	197.750
4	Stanford Cardinal	49.550	49.350	49.325	49.275	197.500
5	Utah Red Rocks	49.400	49.300	49.350	49.325	197.375
6	Arkansas Razorbacks	49.450	49.175	49.225	48.450	196.300
