= Katherine Grable =

American artistic gymnast

Gymnastics career
- Discipline: Women's artistic gymnastics
- Country represented: United States
- College team: Arkansas Razorbacks
- Former coaches: Phyllis and Dale Hardt of Oshkosh Gymnastics Center, Oshkosh, WI
Medal record
Women's Artistic gymnastics
Representing Arkansas Razorbacks
NCAA Championships
Gold medal – first place	2014 Birmingham	Vault
Gold medal – first place	2014 Birmingham	Floor
Silver medal – second place	2014 Birmingham	All-Around
- Education: University of Arkansas

Katherine Grable is an American gymnast. Competing as a gymnast for the Arkansas Razorbacks, Grable capped off her career by winning both the Vault and the Floor at the 2014 NCAA Women's Gymnastics Championships, also attaining second in the All-Around.

She won on Floor with a score of 9.9625, while her score of 9.975 on Vault (tied with Rheagan Courville) was the highest in the history of the NCAA championships for that event.

2014 was Katherine's fourth trip to the NCAA Event Finals – and also the last meet of her college gymnastics career. Previously, she had qualified twice on Floor and once on Beam. Her highest finish had been sixth on Floor in 2013, with a score of 9.8875. After winning the NCAA title in two events for 2014, she commented: “It has been a dream of mine for my floor and vault routines to be recognized during my time as a Razorback. To win both events in the final meet of my career is surreal.”

At various points in time, she has done better than she initially thought possible. Looking back on her entry into the Razorback program, she said, “When I first came in, I was just oblivious to everything. I just kind of came in – I never really thought, as a freshman, that I'd have an impact on the program.”

In an interview just prior to the Southeastern Conference (SEC) Championships (in March 2014), when asked about trouble with her hip, Katherine replied that she had been “having trouble with it all year” and had been doing “the least amount of skills possible, just trying to keep it as healthy as possible.” Asked about the likely impact of this in the SEC competition, she said that she had been dealing with it all year, since before the season started” and that this was just another day. Asked about specific goals, she said that she wanted to do well in her routines and that in her last SEC competition, she just wanted “to really have fun”. At the competition, following a vote of all the coaches, she was named SEC Gymnast of the Year.

She was the gymnastics stunt double for Haley Lu Richardson in the film The Bronze.
