= Daria Bijak =

German Gymnast raised in Muenster, NRW

- Full name: Daria Eva Bijak
- Born: 12 November 1985 (age 40) Racibórz, Poland

Gymnastics career
- Discipline: Women's artistic gymnastics
- Country represented: Germany (1998–2008)
- College team: Utah Red Rocks (2007–2010)
- Club: Deutsche Sporthochschule
Medal record
Representing Utah Red Rocks
NCAA Championships
| Silver medal – second place | 2007 Salt Lake City | Team |
| Silver medal – second place | 2008 Athens | Team |
| Bronze medal – third place | 2009 Lincoln | Team |

Daria Eva Kiehne (née Bijak) (born 12 November 1985 in Racibórz, Poland) is a German former artistic gymnast. She is a two-time German national champion (2005, 2006) and competed for Germany at the 2002, 2003, 2005, and 2006 World Artistic Gymnastics Championships. She represented Germany at the 2008 Summer Olympics.

== Early life ==
Bijak was born in Racibórz, Poland to Christel and Christoph Bijak. She was raised in Greven, Germany, and trained at the Deutsche Sporthochschule in Cologne under Shanna Polyakova. She went on to compete in the NCAA as a member of the University of Utah gymnastics team.

== Gymnastics career ==
Bijak began gymnastics in 1995.

Bijak was selected to compete at the 2000 Olympic Games but had to withdraw from the team after suffering an Achilles injury.

In 2003, in preparation for the World Championships held in Anaheim, California, Bijak along with the German national team trained for a week in Utah. Bijak kept in contact with the Utah Utes student manager Cameron Linford, who would go on to become the director of gymnastics operations. As a result Bijak joined the Utah Red Rocks gymnastics team in 2007. At the 2003 World Championships, Bijak qualified to the all-around final where she finished 20th.

For the 2004 Olympic Games Germany did not qualify a team nor did Bijak qualify as an individual.

At the 2005 World Championships Bijak placed eighth in the all-around. In doing so she set the record for highest all-around placement by a German gymnast (post-reunification) at the World Championships. The record would later be beaten by Elisabeth Seitz's sixth place finish in 2019.

In 2008, Bijak represented Germany at the Olympic Games in Beijing, where she finished 51st in the all-around qualification round.
