= Jennifer Sey =

American artistic gymnast and executive (born 1969)

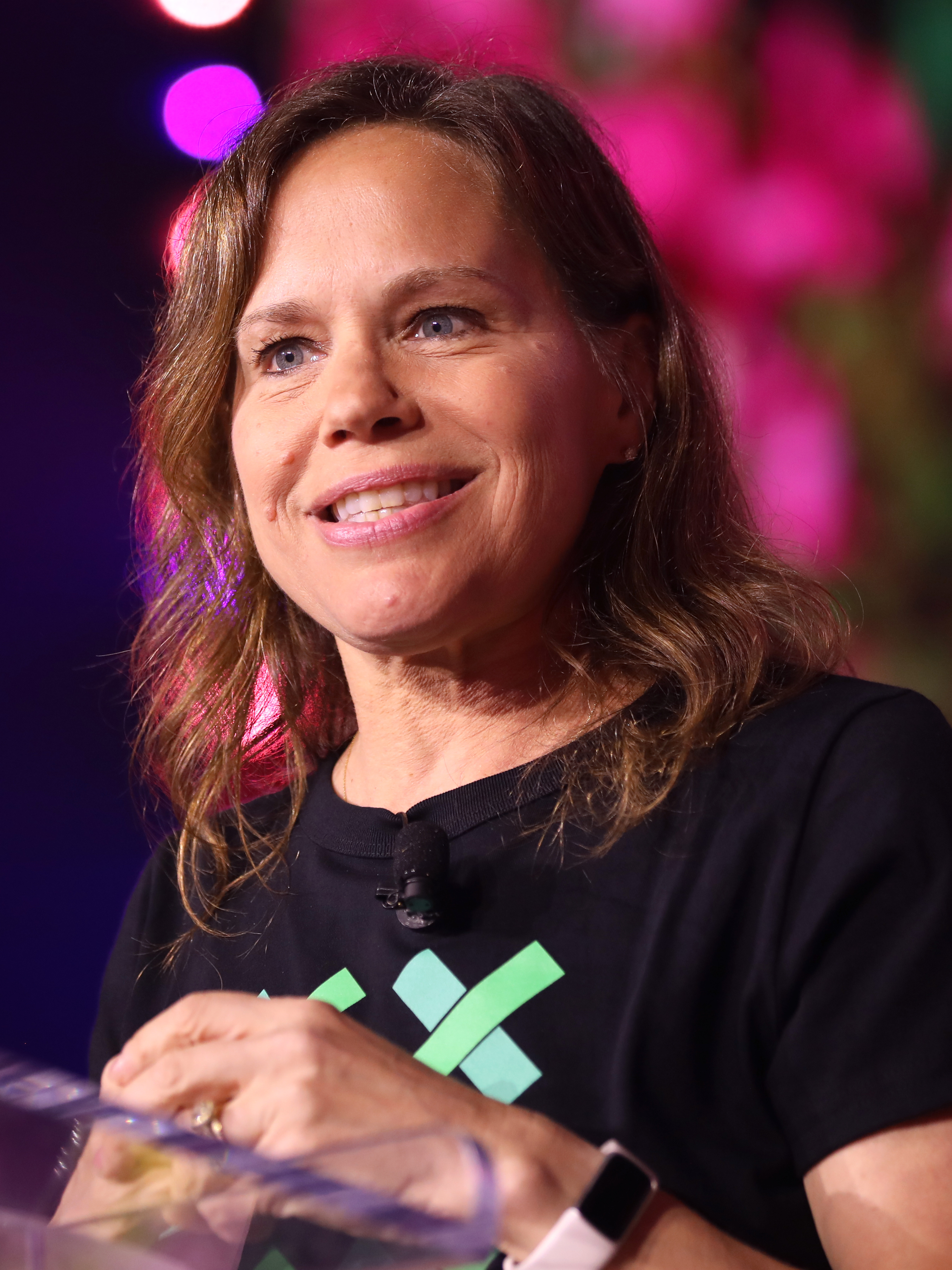
- Sey in 2024
- Born: 1969 (age 56–57)
- Education: Stanford University (BA)
- Occupation: Artistic gymnast (retired)

Jennifer Anne Sey (born 1969) is an American author, business executive, and retired artistic gymnast. She was a seven-time member of the United States women's national artistic gymnastics team and was the 1986 U.S. Women's All-Around National Champion. She was also a member of the 1985 U.S. Women's World Championship team that finished 6th, as well as the U.S. Women's Team at the 1986 Goodwill Games. Following her gymnastics career, Sey entered the business world, and is presently the founder and CEO of XX-XY Athletics. She developed a social media following due to her critical views on school closings during the COVID-19 pandemic.

== Early life and education ==
Sey grew up in Cherry Hill, New Jersey and moved to Haddonfield, New Jersey, where she competed in gymnastics as a teenager and attended Haddonfield Memorial High School. In 1983 she moved to Allentown, Pennsylvania to train at the Parkettes National Gymnastics Training Center. She graduated from Allentown Central Catholic High School in 1987. In the 1985 World Artistic Gymnastics Championships, Sey was hospitalized after fracturing her right femur. Sey then won the 1986 USA Gymnastics National Championships and deferred her college education to train for the 1988 Olympics. However, she decided not to enter the Olympic Trials owing to an injured left ankle which made it "physically impossible" to continue.

In 1988, Sey enrolled at Stanford University. She competed on the gymnastics team for one season in 1989 and graduated from Stanford in 1992 with a double bachelor's degree in political science and communication.

== Career ==
Sey began working at Levi Strauss & Co. in 1999, rising to chief marketing officer and brand president. In February 2022, Sey resigned from Levi's after nearly 23 years at the company, over disputes with management. Sey claims the resignation was in regard to her views on school closures during the COVID-19 pandemic. Throughout 2020 and 2021, she gained attention on Twitter and in the media as a critic of K-12 school closure.

Sey is the author of Chalked Up, an autobiography of her time as an elite gymnast, and was one of the producers of Athlete A, a documentary on the Larry Nassar sexual abuse scandal at USA Gymnastics, which won an Emmy for the 2020 Outstanding Investigative Documentary. In November 2022, Sey published Levi's Unbuttoned: The Woke Mob Took My Job But Gave Me My Voice, an autobiography of her time at Levi's.

Since leaving Levi's, Sey has been a contributing author to the Brownstone Institute, a think tank that opposes various measures against COVID-19, including masking and vaccine mandates, and has written columns for the New York Post about the "woke mob" and cancel culture. She has also collaborated with Focus on the Family, an American Christian right advocacy group that opposes reproductive healthcare and LGBTQ+ rights, appearing on their media platforms to discuss her opposition to transgender women competing in female sports. In February 2023, Sey compared the online reaction from speaking out against COVID-19 school closures to the reaction she received for speaking up about abuse in gymnastics.

In March 2024, Sey started XX-XY Athletics, a sportswear company. The company markets itself as "the only brand standing for women's sports", with its website claiming "it is simply unfair and dangerous at times to allow males (XY) to compete in girls and women’s (XX chromosomes) sports". The company employs pro-female figures as brand ambassadors, including conservative activist Riley Gaines.

== Personal life ==
Sey was a longtime resident of San Francisco before relocating to Denver, Colorado during the COVID-19 pandemic, where she now lives with her husband and four of her children.

Sey was a lifelong Democrat until 2020 where she became an Independent, and voted for Donald Trump in the 2024 Presidential Election.
