= 1998 Junior Pan American Artistic Gymnastics Championships =

International sports competition

Junior Pan American Artistic Gymnastics Championships
- Location: Houston, United States
- Date: July 14–19, 1998

The 1998 Junior Pan American Artistic Gymnastics Championships was held in Houston, United States, July 14–19, 1998.

== Medal summary ==
Event	Gold	Silver	Bronze
Women
Team	United States; Morgan White; Kristin Thome; Monique Chang; Janae Cox	Brazil; Daniele Hypólito; Daiane dos Santos; Mariana Oliveira; Joselane Santos	Argentina; Melina Sirolli; Jessica Neri; Romina Mazzoni; Barbara Rivarola
All Around	Daniele Hypólito (BRA)	Morgan White (USA)	Kristin Thome (USA)
Vault	Romina Mazzoni (ARG)	Monique Chang (USA)	Daiane dos Santos (BRA)
Uneven bars	Morgan White (USA)	Romina Mazzoni (ARG)	Melissa Cesar (VEN)
Balance beam	Kate Richardson (CAN)	Morgan White (USA)	Melina Sirolli (ARG)
Floor exercise	Daniele Hypólito (BRA)	Monique Chang (USA)	Daiane dos Santos (BRA)
Men
Team	United States; Zach Roberts; Paul Hamm; Brett McClure; Jamey Houle	Canada; Eric Kafka; Scott Lang; Matthieu Simard; Martin Monderie	Brazil; Leandro Heredia; João Faria; Paulo Marcio Silva; Victor Camargo
All Around	Zach Roberts (USA)	Paul Hamm (USA)	Brett McClure (USA)
Floor exercise	Paul Hamm (USA)	Martin Monderie (CAN) Zach Roberts (USA)	—
Pommel horse	Antonio Cesar (MEX)	Zach Roberts (USA)	Paul Hamm (USA)
Rings	Regulo Carmona (VEN)	Scott Lang (CAN)	Paul Hamm (USA)
Vault	Zach Roberts (USA)	Martin Monderie (CAN)	Juan Junior Picorelli (PUR) Brett McClure (USA)
Parallel bars	Diego Estrada (COL)	Zach Roberts (USA)	Paul Hamm (USA)
Horizontal bar	Brett McClure (USA)	Jesus Romero (COL)	Diego Estrada (COL)

== Medal table ==
Rank	Nation	Gold	Silver	Bronze	Total
1	United States	7	8	6	21
2	Brazil	2	1	3	6
3	Canada	1	4	0	5
4	Argentina	1	1	2	4
5	Colombia	1	1	1	3
6	Venezuela	1	0	1	2
7	Mexico	1	0	0	1
8	Puerto Rico	0	0	1	1
Totals (8 entries)		14	15	14	43
