= Kristal Uzelac =

American gymnast (born 1986)

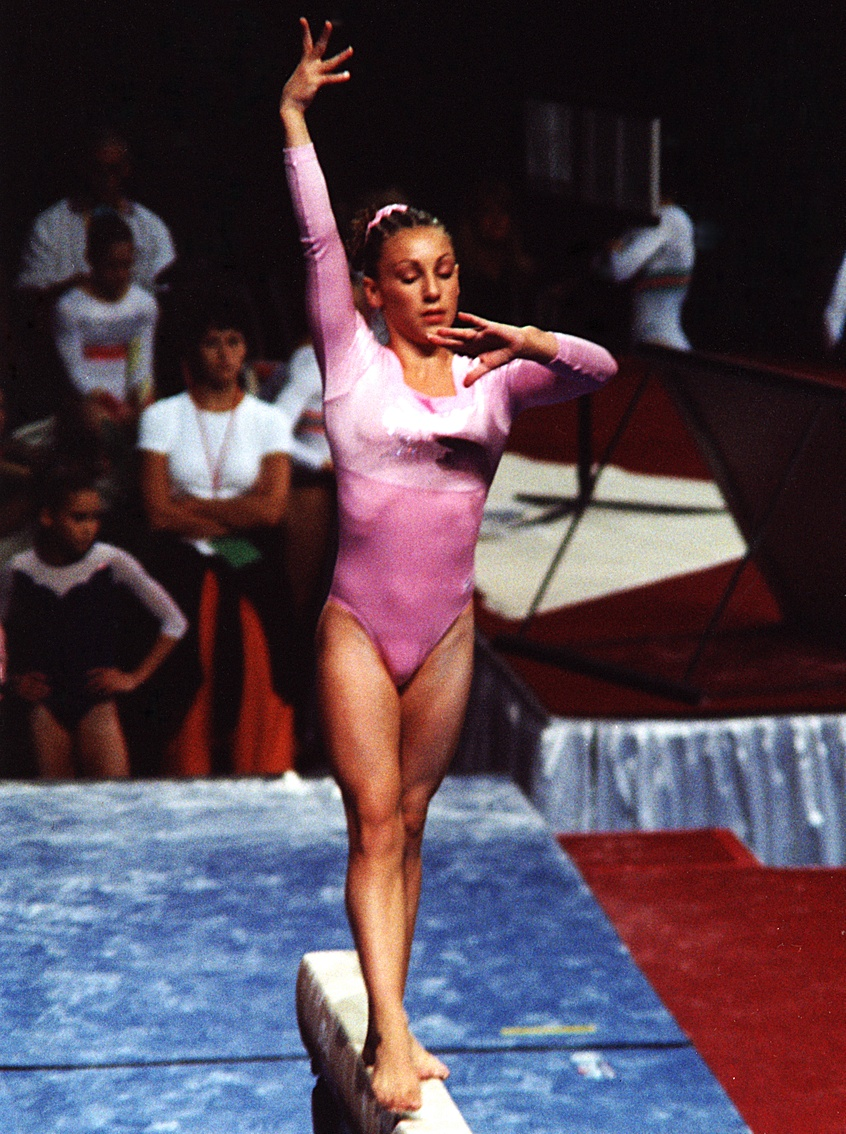
- Uzelac in August 2001

Personal information
- Full name: Kristal Dawn Uzelac
- Born: June 27, 1986 (age 40) Johnstown, Pennsylvania, U.S.
- Height: 5 ft 1 in (155 cm)
- Spouse: Brad Bodenschatz

Gymnastics career
- Discipline: Women's artistic gymnastics
- Country represented: United States (5)
- College team: Penn State University
- Club: Uzelac Gymnastics
- Gym: Parkettes
- Former coaches: Donna Strauss, Bill Strauss, Jack Carter

Kristal Dawn Bodenschatz (born Kristal Dawn Uzelac; June 27, 1986) is a retired American gymnast. A junior national all-around champion for three consecutive years, she was considered one of the United States' most promising junior gymnasts in the late 1990s.

== Early life ==
Uzelac was born on June 27, 1986, to parents Donnie and Brenda. She has one younger brother, Donnie, and two older siblings: a sister, Brandy, and a brother, Alan. Her mother, aunts, and grandmother are all gymnastics coaches.

Uzelac began gymnastics at the age of two at her mother's gym, Turners. She also played baseball and was a wrestler, but ultimately chose to dedicate her time to gymnastics. When she was eight, Uzelac began training at the Parkettes National Gymnastics Training Center in Allentown, Pennsylvania, where she made rapid progress. She was a member of the TOPS national developmental team in 1995 and 1996, and, at the age of 11, won the all-around title at the Junior Olympic national championships and qualified as an elite.

== Gymnastics career ==
Uzelac's first major competition as an elite gymnast was the 1998 U.S. National Championships in Indianapolis. She won the all-around bronze medal behind Morgan White and Ashley Postell.

In Indianapolis, the gymnastics community began to take notice of Uzelac, who stood barely over four feet at the time. Her second day balance beam score was the highest in the field, and her overall total was just over a tenth away from capturing the title.

Uzelac was a member of the American squad for the junior competition at the 1998 International Team Championships, where she placed second with the U.S. team and fifth in the all-around. She also competed in the 1998 Canberra Cup in Australia, an important meet for junior gymnasts, where she placed 10th all-around and won silver medals on vault and floor exercise.

In 1999, Uzelac began her domination of the junior ranks. She won all-around at both the U.S. Classic in Rochester, New York, and the American Classic in Pomona, California, and, at the 1999 U.S. National Championships, captured the all-around, floor, balance beam and vault titles. Uzelac also enjoyed success in international competitions: she was a member of the first-place junior U.S. team, and won the floor exercise title, at the 1998 International Team Championships in Richmond, Virginia. Uzelac also competed in two dual meets: USA vs. Canada in Toronto, and USA vs. France in Normandy. She won the team, all around, uneven bars, and beam titles at both meets.

Uzelac won the junior all-around title in 2000 and again in 2001, making her the only gymnast to win three consecutive junior all-around National Championships titles. She competed at the 2001 American Cup, where she placed third in the all-around and beam and second on floor exercise. Uzelac was named to the American team for the 2001 Goodwill Games, but was replaced by fellow Parkettes teammate Tia Orlando after spraining her knee in training.

In 2002, Uzelac was eligible for senior competition. She competed at the 2002 U.S. National Championships, but injuries forced her to withdraw from three events on the second day of competition. At the Pacific Alliance Championships in 2002, Uzelac was a member of the gold medal-winning U.S. team, won the individual gold medal on vault, and placed third in the all-around.

After leaving elite gymnastics and taking a year-long break, Uzelac returned to compete in NCAA gymnastics for Penn State. As a member of the Penn State team in the 2004–2005 season, she won the uneven bars and balance beam titles at the 2005 Big Ten Conference championship.

== Post-retirement ==
Uzelac graduated from a therapeutic massage school in 2006. She currently works as a coach at her parents' gymnastics club, Uzelac Gymnastics.
