= 2014 NCAA women's gymnastics tournament =

Collegiate gymnastics competition

- Venue: Birmingham–Jefferson Convention Complex (semi-finals and final)
- Location: Birmingham, Alabama
- Teams: 36

Medalists
gold medal	Florida; Oklahoma
bronze medal	LSU

The 2014 NCAA women's gymnastics tournament was the 39th NCAA women's gymnastics tournament, the annual women's gymnastics championship contested by the teams of the member associations of NCAA. The first round (regionals) was hosted on campuses from on April 5, 2014, and the semi-finals and final were held at Birmingham–Jefferson Convention Complex in Birmingham, Alabama from April 18 to April 20, 2014. Florida and Oklahoma became co-champions, with each scoring 198.175 in the Super Six Finals. LSU came in third with a score of 197.600.

== Regional Championships ==
The Regional Championships was held on April 5, 2014, at the following six sites:

- Athens Regional (host: Georgia) – 1. Michigan 196.750; 2. Georgia 196.375; 3. Central Michigan 195.600; 4. Ohio State 195.100; 5. North Carolina State 194.550; 6. Rutgers 193.750
- Baton Rouge Regional (host: LSU) – 1. LSU 198.325; 2. Stanford 197.275; 3. Iowa State 196.350; 4. Kent State 195.125; 5. Auburn 195.050; 6. Arizona 194.825
- Fayetteville Regional (host: Arkansas) – 1. Utah 197.300; 2. UCLA 196.600; 3. Arkansas 196.375; 4. Arizona State Univ. 194.425; 5. UC Davis 193.900; 6. Utah State 191.875
- Minneapolis Regional (host: Minnesota) – 1. Oklahoma 197.725; 2. Illinois 196.600; 3. Minnesota 196.350; 4. California 195.700; 5. Southern Utah 195.150; 6. San Jose State 193.950
- Seattle Regional (host: Washington) – 1. Alabama 197.550; 2. Nebraska 196.975; 3. Denver 195.625; 4. Washington 195.550; 5. Boise State 195.275; 6. Brigham Young 194.650
- State College Regional (host: Penn State) – 1. Florida 197.050; 2. Penn State 196.725; 3. Oregon State 196.525; 4. Kentucky 195.925; 5. New Hampshire 195.025; 6. Maryland 194.525

== NCAA Women's Gymnastics Championship ==
The NCAA Women's Gymnastics Championship were held in Birmingham–Jefferson Convention Complex, Birmingham, Alabama, on Friday, April 18, 2014.

- Afternoon session (1 p.m. CST) – Oklahoma (197.500), Georgia (197.300), LSU (197.100), Stanford (196.600), Michigan (196.425), Illinois (195.800)
- Evening session (7 p.m. CST) – Alabama & Florida (197.650), Nebraska (197.100), UCLA (197.050), Utah (197.025), Penn State (194.825)

== NCAA Championship (Super Six Finals) ==
NCAA Championship (Super Six Finals): Birmingham–Jefferson Convention Complex, Birmingham, Alabama, on Saturday, April 19, 2014. (6 p.m. CST) -

- Team - Florida & Oklahoma (198.175), LSU (197.600), Alabama (197.550), Georgia (197.100), Nebraska (196.500)

== Individual Event Finals ==
Individual Event Finals: Birmingham–Jefferson Convention Complex, Birmingham, Alabama, on Sunday, April 20, 2014. (2 p.m. CST)

- Vault – 1st Katherine Grable, Arkansas & Rheagan Courville, LSU (9.9750); 3rd Haley Scaman, Oklahoma (9.9667)
- Uneven Bars – 1st Bridget Sloan, Florida (9.9375); 2nd Samantha Shapiro, Stanford (9.9250); 3rd Kristina Vaculik, Stanford (9.9000)
- Balance Beam – 1st Taylor Spears, Oklahoma (9.925); 2nd Lindsey Cheek, Georgia (9.900); 3rd Madeline Gardiner, Oregon State & Mary Beth Box, Georgia & Sydney Ewing, LSU & Jamie Schleppenbach, Nebraska (9.8875)
- Floor Exercise – 1st Katherine Grable, Arkansas (9.9625); 2nd Joanna Sampson, Michigan & Maileana Kanewa, Oklahoma & Haley Scaman, Oklahoma (9.950)
- All Around – 1st Kim Jacob, Alabama, 39.625; 2nd Katherine Grable, Arkansas & Alaina Johnson, Florida 39.600

== Champions ==
Event	Gold		Silver	Bronze
Team	Florida; Claire Boyce; Bridgette Caquatto; Mackenzie Caquatto; Bianca Dancose-Giambattisto; Silvia Colussi-Pelaez; Morgan Frazier; Kytra Hunter; Alaina Johnson; Lauren Rose; Jamie Shisler; Bridget Sloan; Rachel Spicer; Kiersten Wang	Oklahoma; Lara Albright; Erica Brewer; Chayse Capps; Rebecca Clark; Maileana Kanewa; Keeley Kmieciak; Kara Lovan; Madison Mooring; Haley Scaman; Taylor Spears; McKenzie Wofford		LSU; Rheagan Courville; Kaleigh Dickson; Sydney Ewing; Ashleigh Gnat; Lloimincia Hall; Jessie Jordan; Sarie Morrison; Britney Ranzy; Jessica Savona; Randii Wyrick
Vault	Katherine Grable (Arkansas); Rheagan Courville (LSU)			Haley Scaman (Oklahoma)
Uneven Bars	Bridget Sloan (Florida)		Samantha Shapiro (Stanford)	Kristina Vaculik (Stanford)
Balance Beam	Taylor Spears (Oklahoma)		Lindsey Cheek (Georgia)	Madeline Gardiner (Oregon State); Mary Beth Box (Georgia); Sydney Ewing (LSU); Jamie Schleppenbach (Nebraska)
Floor Exercise	Katherine Grable (Arkansas)		Joanna Sampson (Michigan); Maileana Kanewa (Oklahoma); Haley Scaman (Oklahoma)	
