= Ashley Postell =

Artistic gymnast

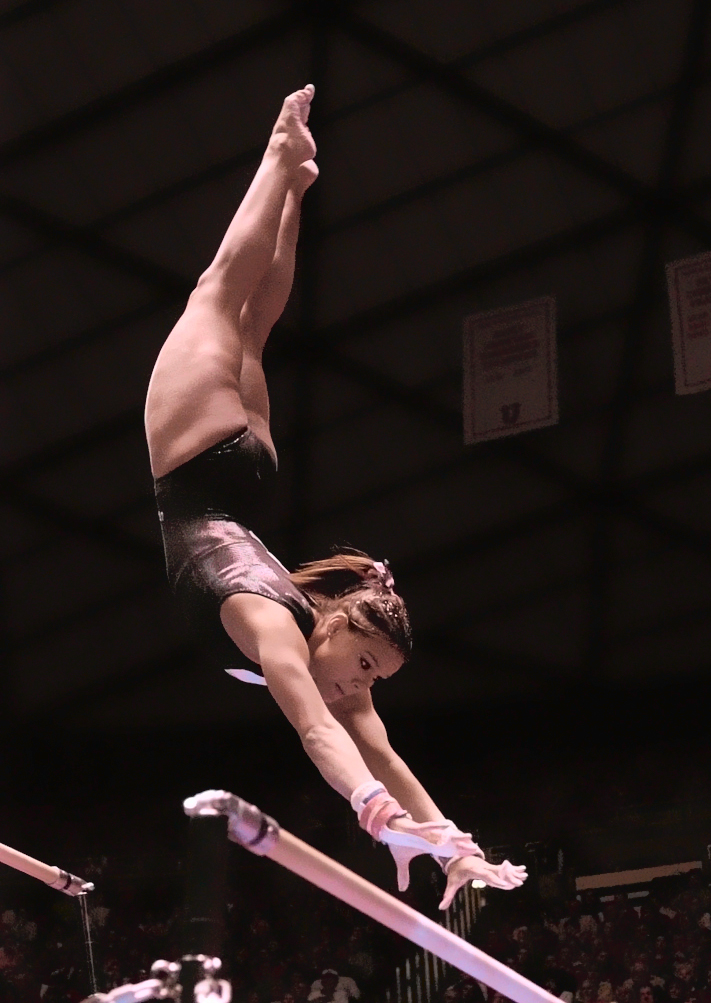
- Postell in March 2006

Personal information
- Born: June 9, 1986 (age 40) Cheverly, Maryland, U.S.

Gymnastics career
- Discipline: Women's artistic gymnastics
- Country represented: United States (1997-2004)
- College team: Utah Red Rocks
- Club: Capital Gymnastics NTC
Medal record
World Championships
Gold medal – first place	2002 Debrecen	Balance beam
Representing Utah Red Rocks
NCAA Championships
Gold medal – first place	2007 Salt Lake City	Balance Beam
Silver medal – second place	2006 Corvallis	Team
Silver medal – second place	2006 Corvallis	All-Around
Silver medal – second place	2007 Salt Lake City	Team
Silver medal – second place	2007 Salt Lake City	All-Around
Silver medal – second place	2008 Athens	Team
Silver medal – second place	2008 Athens	All-Around
Silver medal – second place	2008 Athens	Balance Beam
Bronze medal – third place	2005 Auburn	Team
Bronze medal – third place	2005 Auburn	All-Around
Bronze medal – third place	2005 Auburn	Uneven Bars
Bronze medal – third place	2007 Salt Lake City	Floor Exercise

Ashley Postell (born June 9, 1986) is an American former artistic gymnast. She is the 2002 World champion on the balance beam. After concluding her elite career, she competed for the Utah Red Rocks and became the 2007 NCAA champion on the balance beam.

== Gymnastics career ==
Postell was a member of the United States national gymnastics team from 1997 to 2004. During that time she was the world champion on balance beam in 2002 and the national champion on floor exercise in 2003. She was also the bronze medalist in the all-around at the 2002 US Nationals and the 2003 American Cup.

In 2004, Postell competed in the US National Championships with the hope of qualifying to Olympic trials, but she placed 13th after a fall on the uneven bars and was named an alternate for the trials. Postell was later invited to attend the trials after a qualified athlete had to withdraw due to injury, but declined because she had taken a break from training after initially missing out and thus was no longer in competition shape, and she felt that the opportunity should be given to "someone who was more ready".

After leaving the national team, Postell enrolled in the University of Utah where she won an NCAA record 20 All-America awards for the Utah Red Rocks. Her NCAA high scores included two 10.0s on vault, 9.95 on bars, 10.0 on beam and 9.975 on floor. Her high score in the all-around was 39.800. Postell finished third in the NCAA all-around in 2005 and was second in 2006, 2007 and 2008. In 2007, she took third on floor exercise and first on balance beam, her signature event. In the 2008 championships she placed second on the balance beam.

Postell started working as a gymnastics coach in 2009.
