= 2005 NCAA women's gymnastics championships =

American college gymnastics competition

- Venue: Beard–Eaves–Memorial Coliseum
- Location: Auburn, Alabama
- Dates: April 21–23, 2005
- Teams: 12

Champions
- Women: Tasha Schwikert, UCLA (39.750)
- Team: Georgia (6th)

The 2005 NCAA women's gymnastics championships were contested at the 24th annual tournament hosted by the NCAA to determine the individual and team national champions of women's gymnastics among its member programs in the United States.

The competition took place April 21–23 in Auburn, Alabama, hosted by the Auburn University in Beard–Eaves–Memorial Coliseum.

Georgia won the team championship, the Gym Dogs' first since 1999 and sixth all-time.

Tasha Schwikert, from UCLA, won the individual all-around championship.

== Champions ==
Event	Gold	Silver	Bronze
Team	Georgia Gym Dogs; Audrey Bowers; Nikkie Childs; Megan Dowlen; Michelle Emmons; Kelsey Ericksen; Katie Heenan; Ashley Kupets; Courtney Pratt; Sam Sheehan; Brittany Smith; Brittany Thome	Alabama Crimson Tide; Mari Bayer; Alexis Brion; Brittany Comeaux; Rachel Dalahoussaye; Dana Filetti; Shannon Hrozek; Terin Humphrey; Meredith Laxton; Ashley Miles; Dana Pierce; Michelle Reeser; Erin Rightly; Jessie Silver; Kaitlin White	Utah Red Rocks; Dominique D'Oliveira; Jessica Duke; Annabeth Eberle; Nicole Ford; Gritt Hofmann; Katie Kivisto; Stephanie Lim; Natalie Nicoloff; Gabriella Onodi; Ashley Postell; Kristen Riffanacht; Rachel Tidd
All-Around	Tasha Schwikert (UCLA)	Kristen Maloney (UCLA)	Ashley Miles (Alabama); Ashley Postell (Utah)
Vault	Kristen Maloney (UCLA)	Janet Anson (Iowa State)	April Burkholder (LSU)
Uneven Bars	Terin Humphrey (Alabama)	Kelsey Ericksen (Georgia)	Tasha Schwikert (UCLA); Ashley Postell (Utah); Rachel Tidd (Utah)
Balance Beam	Kristen Maloney (UCLA)	Kristi Esposito (Nebraska); Elise Ray (Michigan)	Kate Richardson (UCLA)
Floor Exercise	Courtney Bumpers (North Carolina)	Ashley Miles (Alabama)	Emily Parsons (Nebraska); Tabitha Yim (Stanford)

== Team Results ==
=== Session 1 ===
Position	Team	Vault (gymnastics)	Uneven bars	Balance beam	Floor (gymnastics)	Total
1	Utah	49.250	49.175	49.075	49.350	196.850
2	Michigan	49.250	49.200	48.900	49.225	196.575
3	Nebraska	48.700	49.100	48.875	49.200	195.875
4	LSU	48.900	49.150	48.575	49.175	195.800
5	Penn State	48.850	48.925	48.125	49.075	194.975
6	Oklahoma	48.775	48.850	47.725	49.075	194.425

=== Session 2 ===
Position	Team	Vault (gymnastics)	Uneven bars	Balance beam	Floor (gymnastics)	Total
1	Georgia	49.350	49.375	49.225	49.400	197.350
2	UCLA	49.100	49.150	49.325	49.450	197.025
3	Alabama	49.050	49.375	49.150	49.425	197.000
4	Florida	48.950	49.050	49.150	49.075	196.225
5	Iowa State	49.175	48.650	48.825	49.325	195.975
6	BYU	48.550	48.425	48.700	48.950	194.625

=== Super Six ===
Position	Team	Vault (gymnastics)	Uneven bars	Balance beam	Floor (gymnastics)	Total
1	Georgia	49.575	49.375	49.350	49.525	197.825
2	Alabama	49.625	49.325	48.850	49.600	197.400
3	Utah	49.375	49.375	49.250	49.275	197.275
4	UCLA	49.450	49.275	48.925	49.500	197.150
5	Michigan	49.050	49.225	48.900	49.400	196.575
6	Nebraska	49.000	49.150	49.075	49.200	196.425

== See also ==
- 2005 NCAA men's gymnastics championships
