= 2006 NCAA women's gymnastics championships =

American college gymnastics competition

- Venue: Gill Coliseum
- Location: Corvallis, Oregon
- Dates: April 20–22, 2006
- Teams: 12

Champions
- Women: Courtney Kupets, Georgia (39.750)
- Team: Georgia (7th)

The 2006 NCAA women's gymnastics championships were contested at the 25th annual tournament hosted by the NCAA to determine the individual and team national champions of women's gymnastics among its member programs in the United States.

The competition took place April 20–22, hosted by Oregon State University at Gill Coliseum in Corvallis, Oregon.

Defending champions Georgia won the team championship, the Gym Dogs' seventh all-time.

Courtney Kupets, also from Georgia, won the individual all-around championship.

== Champions ==
| Event | Gold | Silver | Bronze |
|---|---|---|---|
| Team | Georgia Gym Dogs; Audrey Bowers; Emily Bridgers; Paige Burns; Nikki Childs; Adrienne Dishman; Megan Dowlen; Kelsey Ericksen; Katie Heenan; Ashley Kupets; Courtney Kupets; Brittany Smith; Abby Stack; Tiffany Tolnay | Utah Red Rocks; Kristina Baskett; Dominique D'Oliveira; Jessica Duke; Nicolle Ford; Gritt Hofmann; Nina Kim; Katie Kivisto; Natalie Nicoloff; Gabriella Onodi; Ashley Postell; Kristen Riffanacht; Beth Rizzo; Rachel Tidd | Alabama Crimson Tide; Melanie Banville; Mari Bayer; Rachel Dalahoussaye; Dana Filetti; Ashley Ford; Terin Humphrey; Brittany Magee; Cassie Martin; Ashley Miles; Amanda Montgomery; Ashley O'Neal; Dana Pierce; Courtney Press; Bianca Puello; Erin Rightly; Kaitlin White |
| All-Around | Courtney Kupets (Georgia) | Ashley Postell (Utah) | April Burkholder (LSU) |
| Vault | Ashley Miles (Alabama) | Kristina Comforte (UCLA) | Katie Richardson (UCLA) |
| Uneven Bars | Courtney Kupets (Georgia); Kristina Baskett (Utah) | Ashley Kelly (Arizona State) | Katie Heenan (Georgia) |
| Balance Beam | April Burkholder (LSU); Courtney Kupets (Georgia) | Tiffany Tolnay (Georgia) | Terin Humphrey (Alabama) |
| Floor Exercise | Kate Richardson (UCLA) | Courtney Kupets (Georgia) | Ashley Miles (Alabama); Tabitha Yim (Stanford); Janet Anson (Iowa State) |

== See also ==
- 2006 NCAA men's gymnastics championships
