= Danna Durante =

American gymnastics coach

Current position
- Title: Head coach

Biographical details
- Born: January 9, 1973 (age 53); Tulsa, Oklahoma
- Education: Arizona State

Playing career
- 1992–95: Arizona State Sun Devils

Coaching career (HC unless noted)
- Georgia Gym Dogs: 2012–17

Danna Durante (née Lister) is an American gymnastics coach who served as the head coach of the University of Georgia Gym Dogs gymnastics program from 2012 to 2017. Prior to her head coaching appointment at Georgia, Durante has been involved with three other school teams. Her largest role was the role of head coach of the University of California, Berkeley Golden Bears gymnastics team for the 2012 season. However, a large proportion of her coaching career has been spent at the University of Nebraska–Lincoln, coaching the Nebraska Cornhuskers women's gymnastics team. She joined the Cornhuskers in 2003 as an assistant coach and remained with the team for eight seasons, serving as an associate head coach for the latter three. Her first college coaching appointment came in 1998 when she was hired as an assistant for the University of Washington and the Washington Huskies gymnastics program.

Durante, then Lister, was an elite gymnast in her younger years – a National Team member in 1988 and 1990. Competing for Gymnastics Country USA, she finished eighteenth at the 1988 U.S. Olympic Trials. Earlier in her career, she finished second at the 1987 U.S. Olympic Festival. After her elite career, she attended Arizona State University and competed in collegiate gymnastics for the Arizona State Sun Devils. Throughout her four-year stint as a Sun Devil, spanning from 1992 to 1995, she tallied five Perfect 10 scores; she was a Pac-10 All Academic team member in 1995. In addition to her coaching pursuits, she served as a USA Gymnastics Elite Judge from 1996 to 2000.

Durante was dismissed from Georgia on April 24, 2017.

In 2021, Durante was hired to lead the gymnastics program at the University of North Carolina at Chapel Hill.

== Personal life ==
A mother of three; she has a daughter, Samantha (born June 28, 1999), who was a former Level 10 gymnast. Because of her mother's dismissal from UGA, she no longer wanted to commit to UGA and ended up committing to LSU and now competes for the LSU Tigers women's gymnastics team.
