= Kristen Maloney =

American gymnast (born 1981)

- Full name: Kristen Ann Maloney
- Nicknames: Kris, Maloney
- Born: March 10, 1981 (age 45) Hackettstown, New Jersey, U.S.

Gymnastics career
- Discipline: Women's artistic gymnastics
- Country represented: United States
- College team: UCLA Bruins
- Club: Parkettes National Gymnastics Training Center
- Head coach: Bill Strauss
- Assistant coaches: Donna Strauss, Jack Carter
- Music: "Grease" (1997), "All That Jazz" (1998), "West Side Story Prologue" (1999), "Puttin' On the Ritz" (2000)
- Eponymous skills: Maloney
- Retired: April 24, 2005
Medal record
Women's artistic gymnastics
Representing the United States
Olympic Games
Bronze medal – third place	2000 Sydney	Team
Goodwill Games
Gold medal – first place	1998 New York	Balance Beam
Pacific Rim Championships
Gold medal – first place	1996 Kuala Lumpur	Team
Gold medal – first place	1998 Winnipeg	All Around
Gold medal – first place	1998 Winnipeg	Team
Bronze medal – third place	1998 Winnipeg	Balance Beam
Representing UCLA Bruins
NCAA Championships
Gold medal – first place	2001 Athens	Team
Gold medal – first place	2004 Los Angeles	Team
Gold medal – first place	2005 Los Angeles	Vault
Gold medal – first place	2005 Los Angeles	Balance Beam
Silver medal – second place	2004 Los Angeles	Uneven Bars
Silver medal – second place	2005 Los Angeles	All Around
Bronze medal – third place	2001 Athens	Balance Beam

Kristen Ann Maloney (born March 10, 1981) is a retired gymnast from Pen Argyl, Pennsylvania, in the United States. She won bronze in the team event at the 2000 Olympic Games. Maloney was also the U.S. senior all-around national champion in 1998 and 1999 and the 1998 Goodwill Games gold medalist on the balance beam.

Maloney also competed for the University of California, Los Angeles in the NCAA from 2001 until 2005.

== Early life ==
Maloney was born on March 10, 1981, in Hackettstown, New Jersey and attended Pen Argyl Area High School in Pen Argyl, Pennsylvania in the Lehigh Valley region of eastern Pennsylvania.

== Gymnastics career ==
Maloney trained at Parkettes National Gymnastics Training Center in Allentown, Pennsylvania and was a consistent member of the U.S. national gymnastics team from 1993 to 2000. She competed in a variety of minor international events as a junior elite and, as a senior, qualified for the 1996 Olympic Trials.

Maloney finished fourteenth at the Trials in the shadow of the "Magnificent Seven," but she became one of the most prominent American gymnasts from 1997 to 2000. The national champion in the all-around in 1998 and 1999, she was a key member of the American team at several major international meets. She participated in the 1997 and 1999 World Championships, earned a gold medal on the balance beam at the 1998 Goodwill Games in New York, and won the all-around at the 1998 Pacific Alliance Championships. Maloney ended her elite career at the 2000 Olympics in Sydney, where the American team won the bronze medal after a 2010 investigation by the International Gymnastics Federation disqualified the original bronze medalist, China, for falsifying a gymnast's age. She also finished nineteenth in the individual all-around.

After the Olympics, Maloney attended UCLA on a full athletic scholarship and competed in NCAA gymnastics with the Bruins. She earned All-American honors and scored perfect tens at several meets. In her final college competition, the NCAA Championships, Maloney placed second in the all-around behind teammate Tasha Schwikert, won gold on vault and beam, and successfully completed a double-twisting Yurchenko vault and a full-twisting double layout on floor exercise.

Maloney was plagued by persistent injuries throughout her elite and collegiate careers. A nagging stress fracture led to the placement of a titanium rod in her leg. After one wave of serious injury and illness, Maloney missed two full years of competition with the Bruins; her subsequent return to full form earned her UCLA's C.H.A.M.P.S. Inspirational Award. As a fifth year senior, she won the Honda Sports Award as the nation's top female gymnast.

Maloney graduated from UCLA in 2005 and worked as a gymnastics coach in California. One of her gymnasts was Shavahn Church, a member of the British national team. For a time, she lived in Europe and worked with Cirque du Soleil. She also taught preschool in Queens, New York City.

Maloney began working as an assistant gymnastics coach for the University of New Hampshire in Durham, New Hampshire in the 2010-11 season. She has been an assistant gymnastics coach at Iowa State University in Ames, Iowa since July 2011.

== Skills ==
Her routines included the following skills:

Vault: Double-twisting Yurchenko
Uneven bars: Maloney; Gienger; full-twisting double layout dismount
Balance beam: Front tuck mount; wolf jump half, wolf jump, Rulfova; back handspring, layout, layout; punch front; back handspring, two-foot back handspring, two-foot layout; back handspring, back handspring, double back dismount
Floor exercise: Full-twisting double layout; double layout; punch front through to triple twist; double back; whip to immediate double layout

== Eponymous skill ==
Maloney has one eponymous skill listed in the Code of Points, a toe-on Shaposhnikova on the uneven bars.

Apparatus	Name	Description	Difficulty (Note: Valid for the 2025–2028 Code of Points)
Uneven bars	Maloney	Inner front support on low bar - pike sole circle backward through handstand with flight to hang on high bar	D (0.4)

== Awards and honors ==
- 1999: James E. Sullivan Award: Finalist
- 1999: USA Gymnastics Gymnast of the Year
- 2005: Honda Sports Award
- 2017: UCLA sports hall of fame
- 2024: Lehigh Valley Pocono Sports Hall of Fame
