= Rheagan Courville =

American collegiate gymnast (born 1993)

- Full name: Rheagan Reneé Courville
- Born: March 26, 1993 (age 33)
- Height: 5 ft 2 in (157 cm)

Gymnastics career
- Discipline: Women's artistic gymnastics
- Country represented: United States
- College team: LSU Tigers (Class of 2015)
- Club: Louisiana Gymnastics Training Center
- Head coach: D-D Breaux
- Music: Sail by Awolnation (2013)
Medal record
Women's Artistic gymnastics
Representing LSU Tigers
NCAA Championships
Gold medal – first place	2013 Los Angeles	Vault
Gold medal – first place	2014 Birmingham	Vault
Bronze medal – third place	2014 Birmingham	Team
- Education: LSU

Rheagan Reneé Courville (born March 26, 1993) is a former American collegiate gymnast for the LSU Lady Tigers gymnastics team. In 2013, she was the National Co-Champion on vault and was also SEC Gymnast of the Year, Central Region Gymnast of the Year, and Tiger Athletic Foundation (TAF) Gymnast of the Year. Once again in 2014, Rheagan was the National Co-Champion on vault, 2014 TAF Gymnast of the Year, SEC Gymnast of the Year, Central Region Co-Gymnast of the Year, 2014 NACGC/W Scholastic All-American. From 2012-2015 Rheagan Courville awarded SEC Academic Honor Roll. Has earned the most All America Honors in school history. She also helped the LSU Tigers finish 3rd in the team competition, the highest in school history. 2021 Region 8 Athlete Hall of Fame. During her elite career, Rheagan was crowned 2007 U.S. Classic Champion. Rheagan finished 5th at the 2007 VISA Championships.

== Personal life ==
Rheagan was born in Baton Rouge, Louisiana, on March 26, 1993, to parents, Aaron and Bridget Courville. She has one brother, Ryan. Courville graduated from University Laboratory High School of Baton Rouge in 2011. She graduated from Louisiana State University in 2015, where she majored in Sports Administration.

== Public image ==
Courville has been featured in various newspapers and publications such as The Daily Reveille and The Advocate, compared to in both articles as Seimone Augustus and Glen Davis as 'Baton Rouge's best ever'.
