= GymACT =

- Gymnastics Association of College Teams
- Formation: January 2018; 8 years ago
- Members: 17 (2024)
- President: Mike Burns
- Affiliations: USA Gymnastics
- Website: www.gymact.org

The Gymnastics Association of College Teams (GymACT) is a collegiate men's gymnastics league unaffiliated with the NCAA. It is recognized by USA Gymnastics as a pathway for men's artistic gymnastics.

== History ==
GymACT was officially formed in January 2018 in response to the dwindling number of programs sponsored by colleges and universities at the National Collegiate Athletic Association level. Member teams aim to grow and maintain as self-funded ventures. Historically a sport with large participation, NCAA men's gymnastics was sponsored by over 200 programs in the 1960s. The number has been declining, with 79 programs for the 1981–82 year and plummeting to 20 for the 2002–03 year. As of 2024, just 15 NCAA programs remained.

As programs were cut from NCAA affiliation, some continued on as club teams. Some of those clubs were early members of GymACT and critical to its foundation including Arizona State, Washington Men's Gymnastics, and Temple University, which were joined by Southern California United and NorCal United (now Bay Area Bandits) as the charter members of the organization. They were joined shortly after by New York Alliance. With some clubs keeping their affiliations to their colleges and universities, others have no affiliation at all.

The organization hosts the GymACT National Championships, which started in 2021. Previously, member organizations competed in the USA Gymnastics Men's Collegiate National Championships. The current president of GymACT is Mike Burns.

== Teams ==
GymACT originated in 2018, and through a sequence of team expansions and reductions, consists of 16 teams in the contiguous United States. The current organization divides 16 teams into two 8-team conferences.

Overview of NBA teams
| Conference | Team | Location | Founded | Website |
|---|---|---|---|---|
| WEST Conference | Arizona State Gymnastics | Chandler, Arizona | 2018 | https://azmensgym.com |
| WEST Conference | Bay Area Bandits | San Francisco Bay Area, California | 2018 | https://bayareagymact.com |
| WEST Conference | Iowa GymACT | Iowa City, Iowa | 2022 | https://www.iowagymact.com/ |
| WEST Conference | Kansas City United Twisters | Riverside, Missouri | 2021 | https://kansascityunitedgymnastics.us |
| WEST Conference | Rocky Mountain Mavericks | Lafayette, Colorado | 2020 | https://rockymountainmavs.com |
| WEST Conference | Southern California United | Fountain Valley, California | 2018 | https://southerncaliforniaunited.com |
| WEST Conference | Texas Armadillos | Texas | 2022 | https://txarmadillogym.com |
| WEST Conference | Washington Men's Gymnastics | Mountlake Terrace, Washington | 2018 | https://wmgf.us |
| EAST Conference | Florida Storm | Florida | 2024 | https://flstormgymact.com |
| EAST Conference | Georgia United | Kennesaw, Georgia | 2021 | https://ga-united.com |
| EAST Conference | Indy-Hio Hyenas | Indiana and Ohio | 2025 | https://indy-hio-hyenas.com |
| EAST Conference | Minnesota Men's Gymnastics | Saint Paul, Minnesota | 2022 | https://minnesotagymnastics.org |
| EAST Conference | New York Alliance | New York | 2018 | |
| EAST Conference | North Carolina Airmen | North Carolina | 2026 | https://ncairmengymnastics.com |
| EAST Conference | Northern Illinois University | DeKalb, Illinois | 2019 | https://www.niumensgymnastics.com/ |
| EAST Conference | Temple University | Philadelphia, Pennsylvania | 2018 | https://templemensgymnastics.com |

=== Former ===
- Texas A&M
- University of Illinois, Chicago

== Champions ==
GymACT National Championships
| Year | Site | Championship Results | |
| Year | Site | Team Champion | All-Around |
|---|---|---|---|
| 2021 | Daytona Beach, Florida | Arizona State | Kiwan Watts (Arizona State) |
| 2022 | Mesa, Arizona | Iowa | Evan Davis (Iowa) |
| 2023 | Oklahoma City | Arizona State | Dallas Hale (Texas) |
| 2024 | Daytona Beach, Florida | Minnesota | Aidan Myers (Arizona State) |
| 2025 | Salt Lake City | Arizona State | Toma Murakawa (Bay Area) |
| 2026 | Oklahoma City | Arizona State | Elliot Foster (Arizona State) |
