= Grace Taylor (gymnast) =

American gymnast

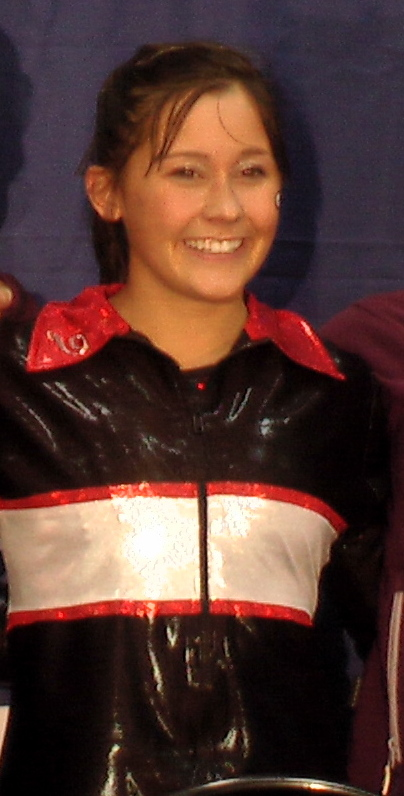
Grace Taylor in 2008

Grace Taylor (born March 29, 1988, in Essex, Maryland) is an American gymnast.

== Early career ==
Taylor spent her club career at Aiken Gymnastics in Aiken, South Carolina. She trained with coaches Draha Krizova and Radek Kriz. Grace became South Carolina's first Eastern National All Around Champion in May 1999, and also became the only South Carolina gymnast to ever win a Junior Olympic National title, when she won beam with a 9.700 at 2001 Nationals in Eugene, Oregon.

Grace was placed on the US Junior National Team in the spring of 2002, and competed in her first US Nationals later that summer. She qualified for Nationals in 2003 as a junior international elite, and as a senior in 2004 and 2005.

== NCAA career ==
Grace joined the gymnastics team at the University of Georgia in 2007, and she is majoring in health promotion.

In her first season as a Georgia Gym Dog, Grace was named a First-Team All-American on beam and a Second-Team All-American on bars, she led off the beam lineup much of the year, averaging 9.85, was ranked in the nation's top 20 on beam and bars, led league freshmen with an average of 9.866 in six regular-season SEC meets, and she contributed to the gym dog's 3rd consecutive NCAA title (8th overall), and 15th SEC championship.

In 2008, and her sophomore season, Grace earned her first career 10 against Iowa State on bars. She was again named First-Team All-American on beam, after she won the NCAA title with a 9.95. She also received First-Team All-American honours on bars, and Second-Team All-American on Floor.

Throughout her time at Georgia, Grace has volunteered for Special Olympics, the Golden Harvest Food Bank and the “Together We Can” food drive, and she also participates in SHINE, a gymnastics-based children's ministry at Cornerstone Church in Athens.
