= Donna Strauss =

American gymnastics coach

- Born: August 12, 1942 (age 83); Pen Argyl, Pennsylvania, U.S.
- Occupation: Gymnastics coach
- Spouse: William "Bill" Strauss

Donna Strauss (born August 12, 1942) is an American gymnastics coach and the co-founder and proprietor of the Parkettes National Gymnastics Training Center in Allentown, Pennsylvania, which she founded with her husband Bill in the 1960s. Donna and Bill were named USA Women’s Gymnastics Coaches of the Year twice and 1998 USOC Women’s Gymnastics Coaches of the Year. They earned the Lifetime Achievement Award presented by the Woman’s Sports Foundation of Lehigh Valley in 1996.
