= Morgan White (gymnast) =

American gymnast (born 1983)

- Born: June 27, 1983 (age 43) West Bend, Wisconsin, U.S.

Gymnastics career
- Country represented: United States

Morgan White (born June 27, 1983) is an American former gymnast. She was the 1998 US Junior National Champion, 1999 Pan American Games All-Around Champion, 1999 World Championships Team, and a 2000 Olympic Games Team USA Member.

== Biography ==
White was born in West Bend, Wisconsin, to Ron and Debbie White. She began competitive gymnastics training in 1988. She attended Central Christian Academy in Fairfield, Ohio.

At the 1997 International Artistic Gymnastics Challenge, in Brussels, Belgium, White was 1st in bars. At the 1997 Pan American Gymnastics Championships, in Medellin, Colombia, she was 2nd team, and 2nd bars.

White was the 1998 US junior national all-around champion. At the 1998 Junior Pan American Artistic Gymnastics Championships, in Houston, Texas, she was 1st team, 2nd all-around; and 1st bars. At the 1998 International Team Championships, in Knoxville, Tennessee, she was 2nd team, and 2nd bars, in the Junior Division. At the 1998 US Classic, in San Antonio, Texas, she was 1st all-around, 2nd bars, 1st beam, and 2nd floor in the Junior Division. At the 1998 American Classic, in Orlando, Florida, she was 1st bars in the Junior Division. At the 1998 John Hancock US Gymnastics Championships (the US nationals), in Indianapolis, Indiana, she was 1st all-around; 1st bars; 2nd beam; 1st floor, in the Junior Division.

In 1999, White was a member of the United States women's national gymnastics team, which came in 5th at the 1999 World Artistic Gymnastics Championships. In Gymnastics at the 1999 Pan American Games in Winnipeg, Canada, she was 1st all-around; 3rd bars. At the 1999 China Dual, she was 1st team. At the 1999 American Classic, in Pomona, California, she was 2nd floor.

At the 2000 US Classic, in Tulsa, Oklahoma, White was 2nd all-around. She won a silver medal in the floor at the 2000 Pacific Rim Championships, and a bronze medal in the All-Around. She won a silver medal in the 2000 American Cup in Orlando, Florida. At age 16, she was 4 feet tall and weighed 83 pounds.

White was named to the 2000 Team USA Olympic team, the youngest member of the team, but had to withdraw before the competition began due to injury. The stress fracture left foot injury, which she had been training through, flared up while she was abroad, and White was forced to withdraw from the competition before it began.

White was a complainant in the USA Gymnastics sex abuse scandal. She said USA Gymnastics national team doctor Larry Nassar started sexually abusing her when she was 16.

== Eponymous skill ==
White has one eponymous skill listed in the Code of Points.

Apparatus	Name	Description	Difficulty (Note: Valid for the 2025–2028 Code of Points)
Uneven bars	White	Stalder forward in L grip to handstand also with ½ turn (180°) in handstand phase	D (0.4)

== See also ==
- List of Pan American Games medalists in gymnastics
- List of U.S. National Championships medalists in gymnastics
- List of former United States women's national gymnastics team rosters
- List of sports terms named after people
