= Courtney McCool =

American artistic gymnast

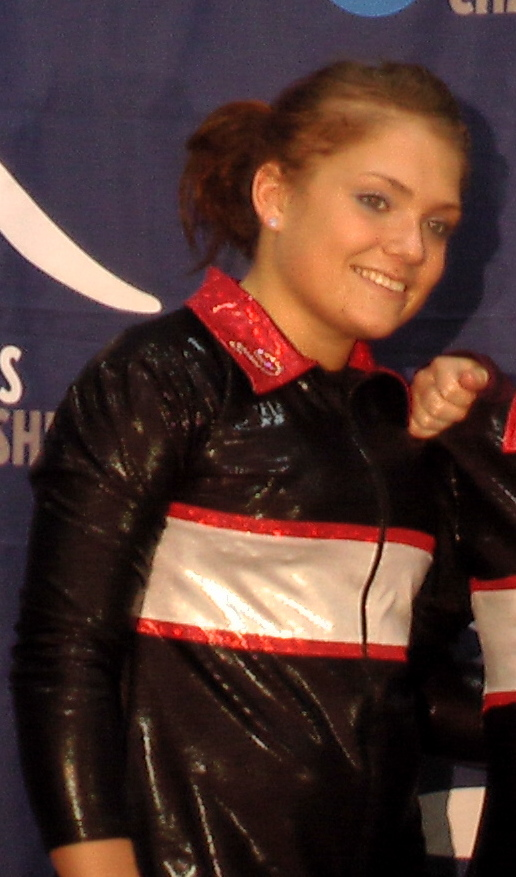
- McCool at the 2008 NCAA Women's Gymnastics Championship

Personal information
- Full name: Courtney Lynn McCool-Griffeth
- Born: April 1, 1988 (age 38)

Gymnastics career
- Discipline: Women's artistic gymnastics
- Country represented: United States (2001–2004)
- College team: Georgia Gymdogs
- Club: Great American Gymnastics Express
- Head coaches: Suzanne Yoculan (3 years); Jay Clark (1 year)
- Assistant coaches: Jay Clark (3 years); Julie Clark (1 year)
- Retired: April 24, 2010
Medal record
Women's Artistic Gymnastics
Representing the United States
Olympic Games
Silver medal – second place	2004 Athens	Team
Pan American Games
Gold medal – first place	2003 Santo Domingo	Team
Silver medal – second place	2003 Santo Domingo	Vault

Current position
- Title: Associate head coach
- Team: LSU Tigers
- Conference: SEC

Coaching career (HC unless noted)
- 2016–2017: Texas Woman's University (Assistant coach)
- 2018–2019: Arkansas Razorbacks (Volunteer asst.)
- 2020–2021: Utah Red Rocks (Volunteer asst.)
- 2022–2023: LSU Tigers (Volunteer asst.)
- 2023–2025: LSU Tigers (Assistant coach)
- 2025–present: LSU Tigers (Associate head coach)

Courtney Lynn McCool-Griffeth (born April 1, 1988) is an American former artistic gymnast who competed in the 2004 Olympic Games. She competed for the Georgia GymDogs in NCAA gymnastics from 2007–2010, helping them win three NCAA team titles. She is currently an associate head coach for the LSU Tigers NCAA gymnastics team.

== Elite gymnastics career ==
McCool was the runner-up in the junior division of the 2003 National Championships and won a silver medal on vault at the 2003 Pan American Games. The following year, her first as a senior international elite, she was the runner-up at the American Cup and the all-around champion at the Olympic Test Event in Athens. She was the only gymnast at the Test Event to qualify for all four event finals, and she won a silver medal on vault and bronze on the uneven bars. She then placed fourth in the all-around at the National Championships and second at the Olympic Trials, earning a spot on the Olympic team.

At the Olympics, McCool competed all four events in the qualification round, but faltered on beam and floor and was excluded from the team finals lineup. The United States team won the silver medal behind Romania.

After the Olympics, McCool joined the T.J. Maxx Tour of Olympic Champions, a nationwide gymnastics exhibition tour. However, after finding out that the tour would not be stopping in her hometown, Kansas City, she joined the Rock 'N Roll Gymnastics Challenge, a rival tour, for its Kansas City show. T.J. Maxx officials said they had not given McCool permission to do so, and dropped her from the rest of the tour.

Late in 2004, it emerged that McCool had been suffering from Kienbock's disease, a wrist condition that required surgery and prevented her from performing in further post-Olympic exhibitions.

== NCAA career ==
McCool earned a full scholarship to the University of Georgia beginning in the 2006–07 school year. In her freshman season, she helped the team win its third straight national title, scoring an event high of 9.95 on beam at the 2007 NCAA Women's Gymnastics Championships in Salt Lake City. At the 2008 Championships in Athens, Georgia, McCool won the floor exercise and contributed to Georgia's fourth consecutive title. In 2009, Georgia won a fifth straight title, and McCool was named an All-American on balance beam, where she scored her first 10.0.

== Skills ==
McCool performed the following routines in 2004:

Vault (Start Value: 9.7): 1½-twisting Yurchenko

Uneven bars (SV: 9.9): Kip, cast handstand (KCH); stalder shoot to high bar; KCH; underswing to blind turn + Khorkina; KCH; Gienger; KCH 1/2 + giant 3/2 (Dawes) + Tkatchev; KCH; giant 1/1 + shootover to handstand + underswing shoot to high bar; KCH; giant + giant + double layout dismount.

Balance beam (SV: 10.0): Front handspring mount (McCool); front aerial + back handspring stepout + layout stepout + layout stepout; switch leap + Onodi; sheep jump; wolf jump 1/1; switch side leap; full turn with leg above horizontal + Popa; roundoff + triple twist dismount.

Floor exercise (SV: 10.0): Popa + tuck jump 2/1; roundoff + back handspring + 2½ twist + front 1/1; double turn with leg above horizontal + wolf jump 1/1; switch ring leap + Gogean; triple full; front double twist + front layout.

McCool's balance beam mount, a front handspring with a two-foot landing, is named after her in the International Federation of Gymnastics' Code of Points because she was the first to perform it at the Olympics.

== Floor music ==
2004: "Peter Gunn Theme"
