= Tiffany Tolnay =

American artistic gymnast

- Born: May 7, 1987 (age 39) Texas, United States
- Height: 1.55 m (5 ft 1 in)

Gymnastics career
- Discipline: Women's artistic gymnastics
- College team: Georgia Gymdogs (2006–09)
- Training location: Athens, Georgia
- Club: Texas Dreams
- Head coach: Suzanne Yoculan

Tiffany Tolnay (born May 7, 1987) is a former American collegiate artistic gymnast. She was a member of the Georgia Gym Dogs from 2006 to 2009, contributing to all four of the team's consecutive National Championship wins during that time.

== Early life ==
Tolnay was born in Texas on May 7, 1987, to James, who was a member of the Arkansas Razorbacks football team and a University of Texas at Dallas graduate, and Melissa Tolnay (née Grant), also an Arkansas graduate. Her younger brother, Austin, was a UT-Dallas graduate also. On Wednesday, July 3, 2013, he was killed in an automobile accident in Decatur, Texas. He was 24 at the time.

Tolnay began gymnastics training at the age of five, in 1992.

== Gymnastics career ==
=== 2002–05: Club competitive career ===
Tolnay advanced to Level 10 for the 2002 season, following her move to the newly opened Texas Dreams Gymnastics to train under former world champion Kim Zmeskal.
