= Tasha Schwikert =

American gymnast and broadcaster

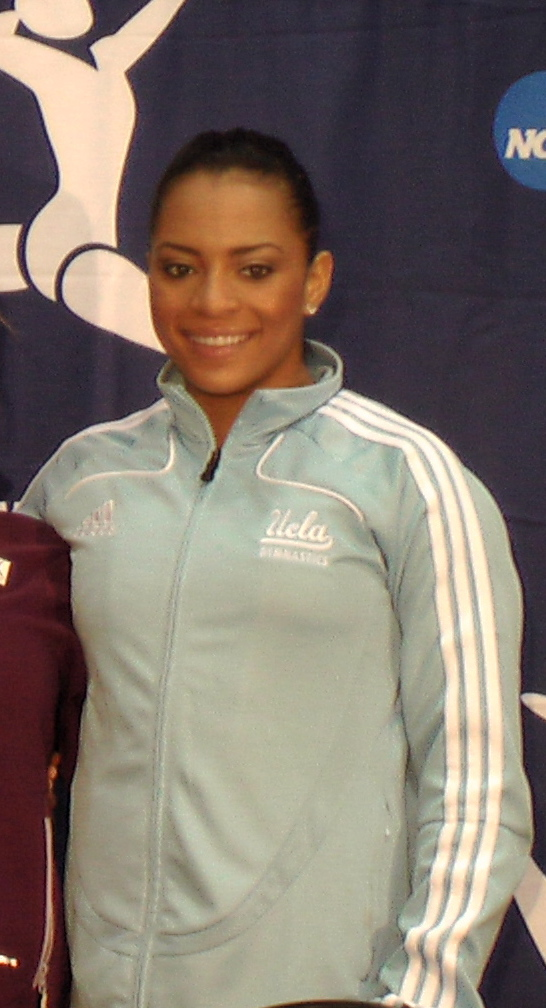
- Schwikert in 2008

Personal information
- Born: November 21, 1984 (age 41) Las Vegas, Nevada, U.S.

Gymnastics career
- Discipline: Women's artistic gymnastics
- Country represented: United States; (1997–2005 (USA))
- College team: University of California, Los Angeles
- Club: Gym Cats
- Former coaches: Cassie Rice; Val Kondos-Field
- Retired: 2008
Medal record
Women's gymnastics
Representing the United States
Olympic Games
Bronze medal – third place	2000 Sydney	Team
World Championships
Gold medal – first place	2003 Anaheim	Team
Bronze medal – third place	2001 Ghent	Team
Pan American Championships
Gold medal – first place	2001 Cancún	Team
Gold medal – first place	2001 Cancún	All-Around
Gold medal – first place	2001 Cancún	Uneven Bars
Silver medal – second place	2001 Cancún	Vault
Silver medal – second place	2001 Cancún	Balance Beam
Silver medal – second place	2001 Cancún	Floor Exercise
Representing UCLA Bruins
NCAA Championships
Gold medal – first place	2005 Auburn	All-Around
Gold medal – first place	2008 Athens	All-Around
Gold medal – first place	2008 Athens	Uneven Bars
Silver medal – second place	2007 Salt Lake City	Uneven Bars
Silver medal – second place	2008 Athens	Floor Exercise
Bronze medal – third place	2005 Auburn	Uneven Bars

Tasha Schwikert Moser (born November 21, 1984) is a retired American gymnast who is a 2000 Olympic bronze medalist, a World Gymnastics Championships team gold medalist, the 2001 and 2002 U.S. senior national all-around champion and the 2005 and 2008 NCAA all-around national champion.

Schwikert began gymnastics at a young age and rose through the ranks to the elite level in the sport in the mid-90s. She was a surprise member of the 2000 Olympic squad, but performed well in both the team preliminaries and finals in Sydney. Following the Olympics, she became one of the most prominent gymnasts in the United States, winning two team medals at the World Championships and placing fifth in the all-around at the 2001 Worlds. An ankle injury impeded her progress and left her named as an alternate on the 2004 Olympic team.

Following her elite career, Schwikert spent four years as a member of the UCLA Bruins gymnastics team. During her time with the Bruins she won two individual all-around NCAA national champion titles and two Pac-10 all-around titles, and was nominated for the Honda Award. She is currently pursuing a career in broadcast journalism, and has already been employed as a commentator at several major gymnastics events.

== Early life and career to 2000 ==
The daughter of Shannon Warren and Joy Schwikert, Schwikert was born in Las Vegas, Nevada. She trained with coach Cassie Rice at GymCats club in Las Vegas, and was a member of USA Gymnastics' TOPS developmental team in 1994 and 1995. At the age of thirteen, in 1998, she earned her first national team berth. Her first international meet was the 1998 City of Popes competition in France, where she won a silver medal on the floor exercise in the junior division.

Schwikert first came to prominence as a member of the U.S. team for the 2000 Olympics in Sydney. Her presence on the team was controversial: she placed ninth at the Olympic Trials, was not originally named to the team at all, and joined the squad in Sydney later as a second alternate. When team member Morgan White was injured in training, Schwikert was named as her replacement, passing over the first reserve Alyssa Beckerman.

USA Gymnastics Online, in their article "Tasha Schwikert Added as Second Alternate to 2000 U.S. Olympic Team", reported on August 28, 2000: "Tasha Schwikert (Las Vegas, Nev.), 15, has been added as second alternate to the 2000 U.S. Olympic Team. The decision to name Schwikert as an alternate was made Friday following a conference call with the selection committee. The selection procedures allow for two alternates to the Olympic Team. Alyssa Beckerman (Wyoming, Ohio) is the first alternate. 'Tasha has demonstrated a great deal of consistency this year in both domestic and international competition', said Bob Colarossi, President of USA Gymnastics. 'Her poise and performances are considered to be very reliable and her desire to support this team is a valuable asset to the group.' Schwikert had competed in seven competitions in 2000 prior to the Olympic Trials, including all three events in the Visa American Cup Series in January and February. She was also a member of the 2000 U.S. Spieth Sogipa team that won a team gold medal in April. She is coached by Cassie Rice at GymCats in Las Vegas."

On April 28, 2010, Schwikert and the other women on the 2000 Olympic team were awarded the bronze medal in the team competition when it was discovered that the previous medal winners, the Chinese team, had falsified the age of team member Dong Fangxiao. As a result of the falsification, Dong's results were nullified, and the Chinese team was stripped of the medal by the IOC.

=== Career from 2001 ===
Schwikert was the only member of the 2000 team to continue competing at the elite level after the Olympics. Sporting a new floor exercise routine and upgraded skills on balance beam and bars, she won the all-around titles at the 2001 U.S. Championships, the American Classic and the Pan American Championships. She participated in the 2001 World Artistic Gymnastics Championships in Ghent, where she led the U.S. team to a surprise bronze medal and was the USA's highest finisher in the all-around, placing fifth. She qualified for the floor exercise and balance beam event finals. A medal was a possibility in the floor finals (her all around score on this apparatus would have been high enough for bronze) but she fell on her final tumbling pass.

In 2002 Schwikert won the all-around titles at the Pacific Alliance and the American Cup, as well as her second U.S. Championships. However, in the fall of 2002, injuries prevented her from competing in the 2002 World Championships.

Schwikert tied for second at the 2003 U.S. Nationals. She was the captain of the 2003 World Artistic Gymnastics Championships team in Anaheim, supporting her younger teammates throughout the competition and demonstrating leadership and good sportsmanship. In the team finals, she only competed on vault and uneven bars but performed both of her routines cleanly, posting the highest score of the American team on the vault and second highest score on the uneven bars. Her scores helped the American women win their first team gold medal in World Championships competition.

Also in 2003, Schwikert traveled to Japan to compete in the third iteration of the Kunoichi television series (known as "Women of Ninja Warrior" in the United States). She made it to the end of the second stage, but failed to finish within the time limit. A slip on the wall climb obstacle cost her valuable time, and her time expired when she was just inches from the buzzer.

At the 2004 U.S. Championships, still struggling with injuries, Schwikert won the uneven bars title but placed off the all-around podium for the first time since 2000. She was named as an alternate to the 2004 Olympic team and flew to Athens with her two fellow reserves, Chellsie Memmel and Allyse Ishino, but was not called upon to compete.

== College career ==
From 2004 to 2008, Schwikert was a member of the UCLA Bruins gymnastics team, competing on a full athletic scholarship. Schwikert's younger sister, Jordan, was also a Bruin. She and Tasha opted to enter UCLA at the same time, and thus were in the same graduating class.

In Schwikert's first year of competition for the UCLA Bruins gymnastics team, she won the NCAA National all-around title. She was the only gymnast in 2005 to earn first-team All-American honors on all four events. Schwikert was sidelined for most of the 2005–2006 season due to a shoulder injury requiring surgery, but remained a student at UCLA and a member of the team. Schwikert returned to the UCLA floor and vault lineup for the Pac-10 Championships in late March, and continued to compete on a limited basis for the rest of the season. While UCLA did not qualify for the 2006 NCAA Nationals as a team, Schwikert qualified as an individual and competed on vault, finishing eleventh in the preliminary round.

Recovered from her injury, Schwikert ended the 2006–2007 season as one of the top collegiate gymnasts in the nation. She won the PAC-10 all-around title for the second time in her career, picking up additional gold medals on the floor exercise, balance beam and vault, and was named the PAC-10 and West Region Gymnast of the Year. She also won the all-around title at the NCAA Southeast Regional Championships. At the NCAA Women's Gymnastics championship in April, Schwikert was the only gymnast from UCLA to win an individual award, earning second on the uneven bars. She was the only gymnast in the nation to rank in the Top 15 on all four individual events, as well as the all-around, and was a nominee for the Honda Award.

Schwikert completed her senior year as one of the strongest gymnasts on the Bruins team. At the 2008 NCAA National Championships, she won her second all-around title and placed first on uneven bars, second on floor, and eighth on vault.

== Current activities ==
Since 2005, Schwikert has been employed as a gymnastics commentator by the WCSN Network. She has covered the World Gymnastics Championships for three consecutive years, working alongside Nadia Comăneci (2005) and Bart Conner. Schwikert has also commentated on UCLA gymnastics broadcasts, and worked with NBC at the Beijing Olympics.

Schwikert has worked on the television series Make It or Break It as both a stunt double and actress.

Schwikert graduated from the William S. Boyd School of Law at the University of Nevada, Las Vegas in May 2015 and worked as an attorney at Munck Wilson Mandala, LLP.

== Personal life ==
Schwikert married professional basketball player Mike Moser in 2015. They have three children.

== List of major honors, accomplishments, and titles ==
- 2008 NCAA Championships: 1st AA, UB; 2nd FX
- 2008 Pac-10 Championships: 1st UB
- 2008 NCAA Southeast Regional Championships: 3rd VT
- 2007 NCAA Championships: 2nd UB
- 2007 Pac-10 Championships: 1st AA
- 2007 NCAA Southeast Regional Championships: 1st AA
- 2005 NCAA Championships: 1st AA
- 2005 Pac-10 Championships: 1st AA
- 2005 West Regional Championships: 1st AA
- 2004 US National Championships: 1st UB; 4th FX (tie)
- 2003 World Championships: 1st team
- 2003 US National Championships: 2nd AA (tie)
- 2002 Pacific Alliance Championships: 1st team, AA, BB, FX; 2nd UB
- 2002 US National Championships: 1st AA, UB, FX; 2nd BB
- 2002 American Cup: 1st AA
- 2002 American Classic: 1st AA, UB, BB, FX
- 2001 World Championships: 3rd team; 5th AA
- 2001 Senior Pan American Championships: 1st team, AA, UB; 2nd FX, BB, VT
- 2001 U.S. National Championships: 1st AA, BB; 2nd FX, VT (tie); 3rd UB
- 2001 U.S. Classic: 1st AA, FX; 2nd VT (tie), BB; 3rd UB
- 2000 Olympic Games: 3rd team
- 2000 Spieth Sogipa: 1st team; 2nd AA
- 1999 World Team Trials: 7th AA
- 1999 China Dual Meet: 1st team
- 1998 City of Popes: 2nd FX (jr)

Key: AA (all-around); BB (balance beam); FX (floor exercise); VT (vault); UB (Uneven Bars)

== Sources ==
1. "Tasha Schwikert". UCLA Bruins. 2005. Archived from the original on February 6, 2006.
2. "USA Gymnastics profile" (PDF). June 17, 2004.
3. "Schwikert added as second alternate". USA Gymnastics press release. August 28, 2000.
4. Thomson, Candus (July 19, 2004). "Hill joining Kupets on road to Athens". The Baltimore Sun. Archived from the original on April 19, 2005.
5. "UCLA sophomore Tasha Schwikert to serve as commentator for Worlds broadcast". UCLA Bruins. November 16, 2005.
6. "Women's Team Competition Report". "International Gymnast" magazine. October 31, 2001.
7. "The Alternates". GymnasticsGreats.com. Archived from the original on July 18, 2011.
8. "Tasha Schwikert". IG Online Interview. 2004.
9. Eaton, Brian (August 20, 2003). "USA Stuns The World With First-Ever World Team Gold Medal". USA Gymnastics.
10. "UCLA Gymnast Tasha Schwikert Has Successful Shoulder Surgery". CSTV. December 22, 2005. Archived from the original on January 4, 2006.
11. "No longer watching, alternate gets shot at spotlight". Las Vegas Review. September 10, 2000.
12. "UCLA's Tasha Schwikert Wins NCAA Uneven Bars Championship, Places 2nd On Floor Exercise". CBS College Sports. April 26, 2008. Archived from the original on May 24, 2011.
13. "From the floor to her future: UCLA student gymnast will compete nationally for the last time in Georgia this weekend". The Daily Bruin. April 23, 2008.
