= Georgia GymDogs =

Women's gymnastics program at the University of Georgia

Georgia GymDogs women's gymnastics
- Founded: 1981; 45 years ago
- University: University of Georgia
- Athletic director: Josh Brooks
- Head coach: Cécile Canqueteau-Landi (2nd season)
- Conference: Southeastern Conference
- Home arena: Stegeman Coliseum (Capacity: 10,523)
- Nickname: GymDogs

National championships
- 1987, 1989, 1993, 1998, 1999, 2005, 2006, 2007, 2008, 2009

Super Six appearances
- 1993, 1994, 1995, 1996, 1997, 1998, 1999, 2000, 2001, 2002, 2003, 2004, 2005, 2006, 2007, 2008, 2009, 2013, 2014, 2016

NCAA Regional championships
- 1986, 1988, 1989, 1990, 1991, 1992, 1993, 1994, 1995, 1996, 1998, 1999, 2000, 2001, 2002, 2003, 2004, 2005, 2006, 2007, 2008, 2009, 2012, 2013, 2015, 2016, 2017, 2018, 2019

NCAA Tournament appearances
- 1984, 1985, 1986, 1987, 1988, 1989, 1990, 1991, 1992, 1993, 1994, 1995, 1996, 1997, 1998, 1999, 2000, 2001, 2002, 2003, 2004, 2005, 2006, 2007, 2008, 2009, 2011, 2012, 2013, 2014, 2015, 2016, 2017, 2018, 2019, 2021, 2022, 2023, 2024, 2025, 2026

The Georgia GymDogs (officially the Georgia Bulldogs) is the women's gymnastics team of the University of Georgia. The team is part of NCAA Division I and competes in the Southeastern Conference (SEC). The GymDogs compete in Stegeman Coliseum in Athens, Georgia.

The GymDogs lead the nation with 10 NCAA Women's Gymnastics championship titles (including five consecutive wins from 2005 to 2009) and 16 SEC championships. The team was coached by Suzanne Yoculan from 1983 to 2009, Jay Clark from 2009 to 2012, Danna Durante from 2012 to 2017, and Courtney Kupets from 2017 to 2024.

== History ==
The women's gymnastics program was started in 1973 with Melinda Airhart as the head coach, and the team competed in the Association for Intercollegiate Athletics for Women (AIAW). After the 1979–80 season, the team began competing in the National Collegiate Athletic Association (NCAA) following the dissolution of the AIAW.

On July 1, 2009, Suzanne Yoculan retired after 26 years as head coach, and Clark, her assistant coach, took over as head of the program. In 2012, Clark was replaced by Durante. Courtney Kupets Carter took over the GymDogs in 2017. Cecile Canqueteau-Landi and Ryan Roberts were named co-head coaches in April 2024. After the 2025–2026 season, Roberts left Georgia to become head coach at Auburn; Georgia named Canqueteau-Landi as the sole head coach.

== Championships ==
As of 2012, the team had won 10 NCAA Women's Gymnastics championships. As of 2012, it had also won 16 Southeastern Conference titles (1986, '87, '91, '92, '93, '94, '96, '97, '98, '99, 2001, '02, '04, '05, '06, '08) and 22 NCAA regional titles.

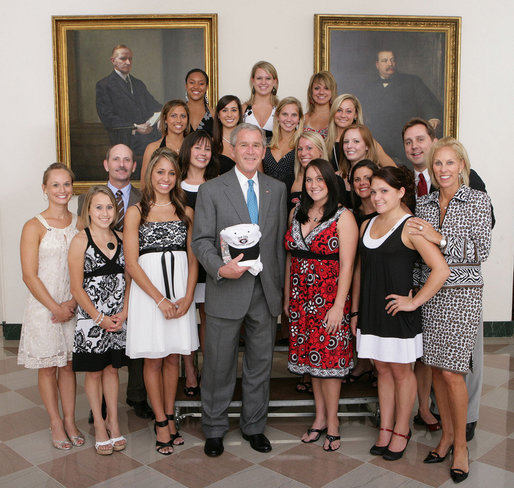
The 2008 Gym Dogs, including individual apparatus national champions Courtney McCool and Grace Taylor, are honored at the White House by President of the United States George W. Bush in June 2008 for their winning the National Collegiate Athletic Association Division I team championship.

Georgia GymDogsTeam NCAA National Championships
Year	National Champion	Score	Runner-up	Score	Location
1987	Georgia	187.900	Utah Red Rocks	187.550	Jon M. Huntsman Center, Salt Lake City, Utah
1989	Georgia	192.650	UCLA Bruins	192.600	Stegeman Coliseum, Athens, Georgia
1993	Georgia	198.000	Alabama Crimson Tide	196.825	Gill Coliseum, Corvallis, Oregon
1998	Georgia	197.725	Florida Gators	196.350	Pauley Pavilion, Los Angeles, California
1999	Georgia	196.850	Michigan Wolverines	196.550	Jon M. Huntsman Center, Salt Lake City, Utah
2005	Georgia	197.825	Alabama Crimson Tide	197.400	Beard-Eaves-Memorial Coliseum, Auburn, Alabama
2006	Georgia	197.750	Utah Red Rocks	196.800	Gill Coliseum, Corvallis, Oregon
2007	Georgia	197.850	Utah Red Rocks	197.250	Jon M. Huntsman Center, Salt Lake City, Utah
2008	Georgia	197.450	Utah Red Rocks	197.125	Stegeman Coliseum, Athens, Georgia
2009	Georgia	197.825	Alabama Crimson Tide	197.575	Bob Devaney Sports Center, Lincoln, Nebraska

=== NCAA individual event champions ===
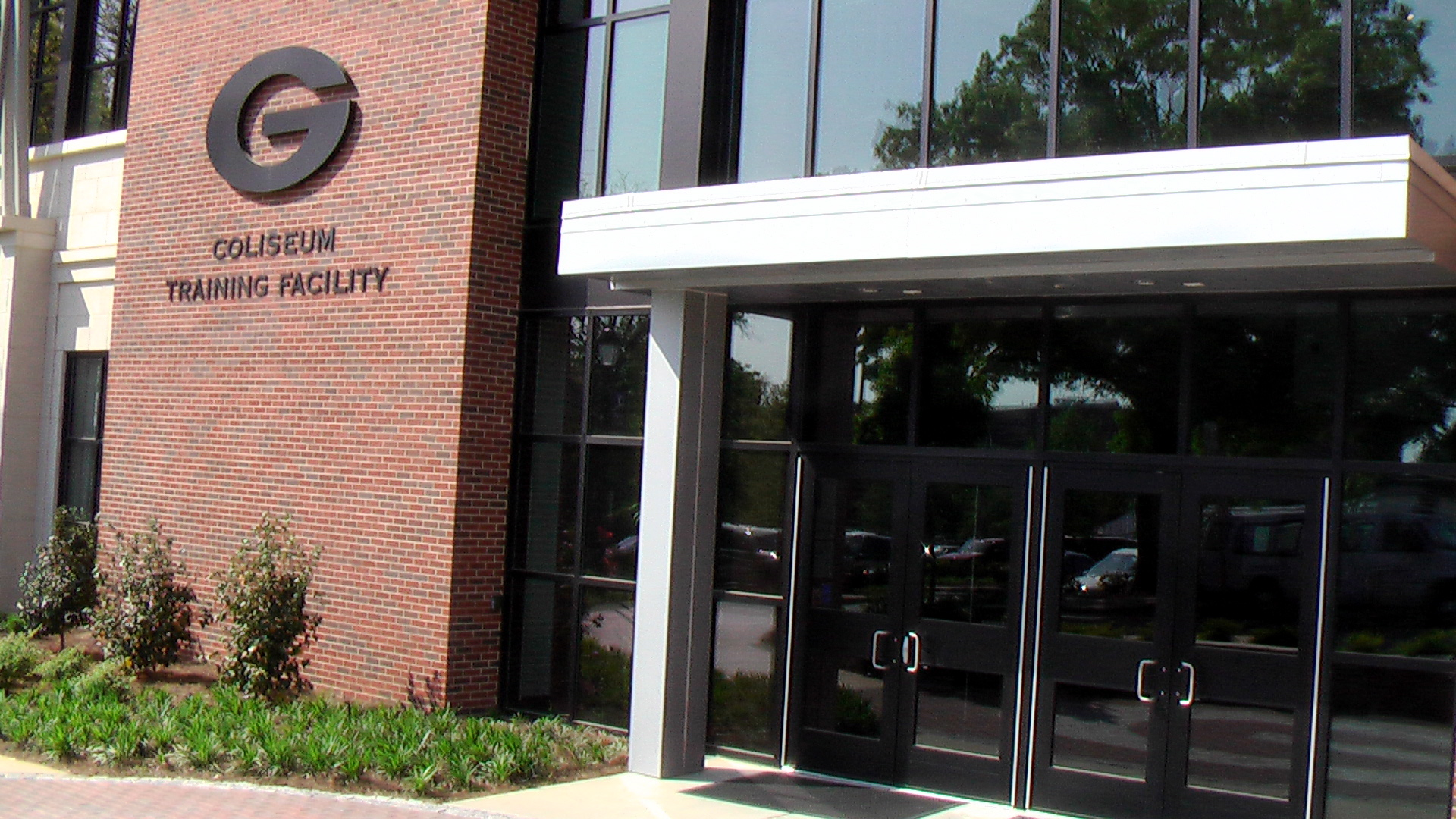
Georgia's home venue

As of the end of the 2016 season, 20 Georgia gymnasts have won a total of 42 individual event championships.

Georgia Bulldogs Individual NCAA Championship Titles
Gymnast	All-Around	Vault	Uneven Bars	Balance Beam	Floor Exercise
Brittany Rogers			2016		
Brandie Jay		2016			
Kat Ding			2011, 2012		2012
Courtney McCool					2008
Grace Taylor				2008	
Courtney Kupets	2006, 2007, 2009	2007	2006, 2009	2006, 2009	2009
Cory Fritzinger		2001			
Suzanne Sears					2000
Karin Lichey					1998
Kim Arnold	1997, 1998			1998	
Jenni Beathard			1997	1998	
Leah Brown		1996			1997
Leslie Angeles					1995
Lori Strong			1994		
Agina Simpkins			1993		
Heather Stepp		1992, 1993			1993
Hope Spivey	1991	1991			1991, 1994
Kelly Macy			1991		
Corrinne Wright	1989				1989
Lucy Wener			1986, 1987, 1989		

== Coaches ==
=== Head coaching records ===
	Name	Seasons	W-L-T	Win %
1	Melinda Airhart	1973–1975	14 – 15 – 0	0.483
2	Andy Long	1976–1979	33 – 12 – 0	0.733
3	Terri Parsons Richie	1979–1981	28 – 6 – 0	0.823
4	Rick Walton	1981–1983	45 – 31 – 0	0.592
5	Suzanne Yoculan	1983–2009	831 – 117 – 7	0.870
6	Jay Clark	2009–2012	6 – 7 – 0	0.462
7	Danna Durante	2012 – 2017	6 – 5 – 1	0.545
8	Courtney Kupets Carter	2018 – 2024	38 – 60 – 0	0.388
9	Cécile Canqueteau-Landi & Ryan Roberts	2025 – 2026	30 – 11 – 1	0.714
10	Cécile Canqueteau-Landi	2027–

== Roster ==
2026–2027
Name	Height	Year	Hometown	Club
Nyla Aquino	5-0	JR	Boston, MA	Elite Gymnastics Academy
Jaydah Battle	5-1	SR	Hampton, VA	World Class Gymnastics
Brooke Gleichowski	5-4	JR	Gainesville, FL	Brandy Johnson's Gymnastics
Natalia Jacoby		FR	Canton, OH	Buckeye Gymnastics
Jazmyn Jimenez		FR	Santa Clarita, CA	Gymnastics Olympica
Jada Kim	4-11	FR	Los Angeles, CA	Gymnastics Olympica
Kendall Knox		FR	Chandler, AZ	Gold Medal Gymnastics
Emma Mason	5-5	JR	Scott Depot, WV	Revolution Gymnastics
Avery Moll	5-1	SO	Westerville, OH	Buckeye Gymnastics
Brooke Pierson	5-4	SO	Spring, TX	World Champions Centre
Autumn Reingold	5-4	SO	Cypress, TX	World Champions Centre
Joscelyn Roberson	4-8	JR	Texarkana, TX	World Champions Centre
Lily Smith	5-2	SR	Limerick, PA	Silvia's Gymnastics
Holly Snyder	5-3	SR	Annapolis, MD	Docksiders Gymnastics
Sutton Strasser	5-3	FR	Northport, NY	Infiniti Elite Gymnastics
Harley Tomlin	5-3	JR	Pittsburgh, PA	Xquisite Gymnastics
Anya Turner	5-0	SR	Highlands Ranch, CO	Colorado Gymnastics Institute
Ady Wahl	5-3	SR	Zanesville, OH	Zanesville Gymnastics
CaMarah Williams	5'1	SO	Kansas City, MO	EDGE Gymnastics - Riverside
Kelise Woolford	5'2	SO	Westerville, OH	Buckeye Gymnastics

== Home venue ==
- Stegeman Coliseum

== Georgia gymnasts at the Olympics ==
=== Olympians ===
Year	Country	Name	Medal(s)
1988	United States	Hope Spivey	
1996	Puerto Rico	Eileen Diaz	
1992	Canada	Lori Strong	
2004	United States	Courtney Kupets	team uneven bars
2004	United States	Courtney McCool	team
2012	Canada	Brittany Rogers	
2024	Hungary	Csenge Bácskay	

=== Alternates ===
Year	Country	Name
2016	Canada	Megan Roberts
2020	United States	Kara Eaker
2024	United States	Joscelyn Roberson

== See also ==
- Georgia Bulldogs
- Uga (mascot)
