= List of U.S. National Championships medalists in gymnastics =

A list of all senior medalists at the USA Gymnastics National Championships.

== Senior Women's Medalists ==
=== All-Around ===
All-Around
Year	Location	Gold	Silver	Bronze
1986	Indianapolis, Indiana	Jennifer Sey	Hope Spivey	Joyce Wilborn
1987	Kansas City, Missouri	Kristie Phillips	Missy Marlowe	Sabrina Mar
1988	Houston, Texas	Phoebe Mills	Kelly Garrison	Hope Spivey
1989	Minneapolis, Minnesota	Brandy Johnson	Christy Henrich	Sandy Woolsey
1990	Denver, Colorado	Kim Zmeskal	Betty Okino	Brandy Johnson
1991	Cincinnati, Ohio	Kim Zmeskal	Sandy Woolsey	Kerri Strug
1992	Columbus, Ohio	Kim Zmeskal	Kerri Strug	Michelle Campi
1993	Salt Lake City, Utah	Shannon Miller	Dominique Dawes	Kerri Strug
1994	Nashville, Tennessee	Dominique Dawes	Shannon Miller	Amanda Borden
1995	New Orleans, Louisiana	Dominique Moceanu	Shannon Miller	Jaycie Phelps
1996	Knoxville, Tennessee	Shannon Miller	Jaycie Phelps	Dominique Moceanu
1997	Denver, Colorado	Vanessa Atler; Kristy Powell	None Awarded	Mohini Bhardwaj
1998	Indianapolis, Indiana	Kristen Maloney	Vanessa Atler	Dominique Moceanu
1999	Sacramento, California	Kristen Maloney	Vanessa Atler	Jennie Thompson
2000	St. Louis, Missouri	Elise Ray	Kristen Maloney	Jamie Dantzscher
2001	Philadelphia, Pennsylvania	Tasha Schwikert	Tabitha Yim	Mohini Bhardwaj
2002	Cleveland, Ohio	Tasha Schwikert	Tabitha Yim	Ashley Postell
2003	Milwaukee, Wisconsin	Courtney Kupets	Tasha Schwikert	Hollie Vise
2004	Nashville, Tennessee	Courtney Kupets; Carly Patterson	None Awarded	Terin Humphrey
2005	Indianapolis, Indiana	Nastia Liukin	Chellsie Memmel	Jana Bieger
2006	Saint Paul, Minnesota	Nastia Liukin	Natasha Kelley	Jana Bieger
2007	San Jose, California	Shawn Johnson	Shayla Worley	Nastia Liukin
2008	Boston, Massachusetts	Shawn Johnson	Nastia Liukin	Chellsie Memmel
2009	Dallas, Texas	Bridget Sloan	Ivana Hong	Rebecca Bross
2010	Hartford, Connecticut	Rebecca Bross	Mattie Larson	Aly Raisman
2011	Saint Paul, Minnesota	Jordyn Wieber	McKayla Maroney	Aly Raisman
2012	St. Louis, Missouri	Jordyn Wieber	Gabby Douglas	Aly Raisman
2013	Hartford, Connecticut	Simone Biles	Kyla Ross	Brenna Dowell
2014	Pittsburgh, Pennsylvania	Simone Biles	Kyla Ross	Maggie Nichols
2015	Indianapolis, Indiana	Simone Biles	Maggie Nichols	Aly Raisman
2016	St. Louis, Missouri	Simone Biles	Aly Raisman	Laurie Hernandez
2017	Anaheim, California	Ragan Smith	Jordan Chiles	Riley McCusker
2018	Boston, Massachusetts	Simone Biles	Morgan Hurd	Riley McCusker
2019	Kansas City, Missouri	Simone Biles	Sunisa Lee	Grace McCallum
~~2020~~	~~Fort Worth, Texas~~	Canceled due to the COVID-19 pandemic in the USA		
2021	Fort Worth, Texas	Simone Biles	Sunisa Lee	Jordan Chiles
2022	Tampa, Florida	Konnor McClain	Shilese Jones	Jordan Chiles
2023	San Jose, California	Simone Biles	Shilese Jones	Leanne Wong
2024	Fort Worth, Texas	Simone Biles	Skye Blakely	Kayla DiCello
2025	New Orleans, Louisiana	Hezly Rivera	Leanne Wong	Joscelyn Roberson
2026	Phoenix, Arizona	Hezly Rivera	Claire Pease	Charleigh Bullock

=== Vault ===
Vault
Year	Location	Gold	Silver	Bronze
1986	Indianapolis, Indiana	Joyce Wilborn	Tracy Calore	Angie Denkins
1987	Kansas City, Missouri	Kristie Phillips	Rhonda Faehn Joyce Wilborn	—N/a
1988	Houston, Texas	Stacey Gunthorpe	Brandy Johnson	Rhonda Faehn
1989	Minneapolis, Minnesota	Brandy Johnson	Holly Voorheis	Kim Kelly
1990	Denver, Colorado	Brandy Johnson	Sandy Woolsey	Amy Scherr
1991	Cincinnati, Ohio	Kim Zmeskal	Kim Kelly	Shannon Miller
1992	Columbus, Ohio	Kerri Strug	Kim Zmeskal	Kim Kelly
1993	Salt Lake City, Utah	Dominique Dawes	Shannon Miller	Kim Arnold
1994	Nashville, Tennessee	Dominique Dawes	Shannon Miller	Amy Chow
1995	New Orleans, Louisiana	Shannon Miller	Heather Brink	Dominique Moceanu
1996	Knoxville, Tennessee	Dominique Dawes	Kerri Strug	Kristy Powell
1997	Denver, Colorado	Vanessa Atler	Kristen Maloney	Mohini Bhardwaj Jeanette Antolin
1998	Indianapolis, Indiana	Dominique Moceanu	Vanessa Atler	Jennie Thompson
1999	Sacramento, California	Vanessa Atler	Marline Stephens	Marie Fjordholm
2000	St. Louis, Missouri	Kristen Maloney	Vanessa Atler	Kendall Beck
2001	Philadelphia, Pennsylvania	Mohini Bhardwaj	Tasha Schwikert Ashley Miles	—N/a
2002	Cleveland, Ohio	Liz Tricase	Annia Hatch	Ashley Miles
2003	Milwaukee, Wisconsin	Annia Hatch	Kristina Comforte	Tasha Schwikert
2004	Nashville, Tennessee	Liz Tricase	Mohini Bhardwaj	Kristina Comforte Alicia Sacramone
2005	Indianapolis, Indiana	Alicia Sacramone	Annie DiLuzio	Susan Jackson
2006	Saint Paul, Minnesota	Alicia Sacramone	Jana Bieger	Kassi Price
2007	San Jose, California	Alicia Sacramone	—N/a	
2008	Boston, Massachusetts	Alicia Sacramone	Britney Ranzy	—N/a
2009	Dallas, Texas	Kayla Williams	—N/a	
2010	Hartford, Connecticut	Alicia Sacramone	Vanessa Zamarripa	Brandie Jay
2011	Saint Paul, Minnesota	McKayla Maroney	Alicia Sacramone	Brandie Jay
2012	St. Louis, Missouri	Alicia Sacramone	Brandie Jay	MyKayla Skinner
2013	Hartford, Connecticut	McKayla Maroney	Simone Biles	MyKayla Skinner
2014	Pittsburgh, Pennsylvania	Simone Biles	MyKayla Skinner	—N/a
2015	Indianapolis, Indiana	Simone Biles	MyKayla Skinner	—N/a
2016	St. Louis, Missouri	Simone Biles	MyKayla Skinner	—N/a
2017	Anaheim, California	Jade Carey	—N/a	
2018	Boston, Massachusetts	Simone Biles	Jordan Chiles	Jade Carey
2019	Kansas City, Missouri	Simone Biles	Jade Carey	MyKayla Skinner
~~2020~~	~~Fort Worth, Texas~~	Canceled due to the COVID-19 pandemic in the USA		
2021	Fort Worth, Texas	Simone Biles	MyKayla Skinner	Jordan Chiles
2022	Tampa, Florida	Jade Carey	Joscelyn Roberson	—N/a
2023	San Jose, California	Joscelyn Roberson	Skye Blakely	Jade Carey
2024	Fort Worth, Texas	Simone Biles	Skye Blakely	Jade Carey
2025	New Orleans, Louisiana	Leanne Wong	Claire Pease	Izzy Stassi
2026	Phoenix, Arizona	Jade Carey	Claire Pease	Izzy Stassi

=== Uneven Bars ===
Uneven Bars
Year	Location	Gold	Silver	Bronze
1986	Indianapolis, Indiana	Marie Roethlisberger	Hope Spivey Beth Hansen	—N/a
1987	Kansas City, Missouri	Missy Marlowe	Sabrina Mar	Kristie Phillips
1988	Houston, Texas	Chelle Stack	Stacey Gunthorpe	Phoebe Mills
1989	Minneapolis, Minnesota	Chelle Stack	Christy Henrich	Sandy Woolsey
1990	Denver, Colorado	Sandy Woolsey	Christy Henrich Kim Zmeskal	—N/a
1991	Cincinnati, Ohio	Sandy Woolsey	Elisabeth Crandall	Wendy Bruce
1992	Columbus, Ohio	Dominique Dawes	Kim Zmeskal	Wendy Bruce
1993	Salt Lake City, Utah	Shannon Miller	Kerri Strug	Dominique Dawes
1994	Nashville, Tennessee	Dominique Dawes	Shannon Miller	Amanda Borden
1995	New Orleans, Louisiana	Dominique Dawes	Doni Thompson	Kerri Strug
1996	Knoxville, Tennessee	Dominique Dawes	Katie Teft	Monica Flammer
1997	Denver, Colorado	Kristy Powell	Mary Beth Arnold	Vanessa Atler Jamie Dantzscher
1998	Indianapolis, Indiana	Elise Ray	Alyssa Beckerman	Jeanette Antolin
1999	Sacramento, California	Jennie Thompson Jamie Dantzscher	—N/a	Morgan White Alyssa Beckerman
2000	St. Louis, Missouri	Elise Ray	Alyssa Beckerman Shannon Miller Amy Chow	—N/a
2001	Philadelphia, Pennsylvania	Katie Heenan	Tabitha Yim	Tasha Schwikert
2002	Cleveland, Ohio	Kristal Uzelac	Tasha Schwikert	Ashley Postell
2003	Milwaukee, Wisconsin	Tasha Schwikert Katie Heenan	—N/a	Hollie Vise Courtney Kupets
2004	Nashville, Tennessee	Courtney Kupets	Carly Patterson	Terin Humphrey
2005	Indianapolis, Indiana	Nastia Liukin	Chellsie Memmel	Jana Bieger
2006	Saint Paul, Minnesota	Nastia Liukin	Natasha Kelley	Kassi Price
2007	San Jose, California	Nastia Liukin	Shayla Worley	Shawn Johnson
2008	Boston, Massachusetts	Nastia Liukin	Chellsie Memmel	Bridget Sloan
2009	Dallas, Texas	Bridget Sloan	Cassandra Whitcomb	Mackenzie Caquatto
2010	Hartford, Connecticut	Rebecca Bross	Cassandra Whitcomb	Mattie Larson
2011	Saint Paul, Minnesota	Jordyn Wieber	Mackenzie Caquatto	Anna Li; Gabby Douglas
2012	St. Louis, Missouri	Gabby Douglas	Kyla Ross	Anna Li
2013	Hartford, Connecticut	Kyla Ross	Simone Biles	Brenna Dowell
2014	Pittsburgh, Pennsylvania	Ashton Locklear	Madison Kocian	Maggie Nichols
2015	Indianapolis, Indiana	Madison Kocian	Ashton Locklear	Bailie Key
2016	St. Louis, Missouri	Ashton Locklear	Madison Kocian	Laurie Hernandez
2017	Anaheim, California	Riley McCusker	Ashton Locklear	Ragan Smith Marissa Oakley
2018	Boston, Massachusetts	Simone Biles	Riley McCusker	Morgan Hurd
2019	Kansas City, Missouri	Sunisa Lee	Morgan Hurd	Simone Biles
~~2020~~	~~Fort Worth, Texas~~	Canceled due to the COVID-19 pandemic in the USA		
2021	Fort Worth, Texas	Sunisa Lee	Riley McCusker	Simone Biles
2022	Tampa, Florida	Shilese Jones Leanne Wong	—N/a	Jordan Chiles
2023	San Jose, California	Shilese Jones	Skye Blakely	Simone Biles
2024	Fort Worth, Texas	Simone Biles	Jordan Chiles	Skye Blakely
2025	New Orleans, Louisiana	Skye Blakely Hezly Rivera	—N/a	Leanne Wong
2026	Phoenix, Arizona	Claire Pease	Skye Blakely	Charleigh Bullock

=== Balance Beam ===
Balance Beam
Year	Location	Gold	Silver	Bronze
1986	Indianapolis, Indiana	Angie Denkins	Alyssa Solomon Joyce Wilborn	—N/a
1987	Kansas City, Missouri	Kristie Phillips	Sabrina Mar	Jennifer Sey
1988	Houston, Texas	Phoebe Mills	Kristie Phillips	Kelly Garrison
1989	Minneapolis, Minnesota	Brandy Johnson	Christy Henrich	Sheryl Dundas
1990	Denver, Colorado	Betty Okino	Kim Zmeskal	Erica Stokes
1991	Cincinnati, Ohio	Shannon Miller	Kim Zmeskal Kerri Strug	—N/a
1992	Columbus, Ohio	Kim Zmeskal Kerri Strug	—N/a	Hilary Grivich
1993	Salt Lake City, Utah	Dominique Dawes	Kellee Davis	Shannon Miller
1994	Nashville, Tennessee	Dominique Dawes	Shannon Miller	Jennie Thompson
1995	New Orleans, Louisiana	Doni Thompson Monica Flammer	—N/a	Dominique Dawes
1996	Knoxville, Tennessee	Dominique Dawes	Mohini Bhardwaj	Katie Teft
1997	Denver, Colorado	Kendall Beck	Raegan Tomasek	Kaitie Dysonn
1998	Indianapolis, Indiana	Dominique Moceanu	Kristen Maloney	Jeana Rice
1999	Sacramento, California	Vanessa Atler	Kristen Maloney	Jennie Thompson
2000	St. Louis, Missouri	Alyssa Beckerman Amy Chow	—N/a	Elise Ray
2001	Philadelphia, Pennsylvania	Tasha Schwikert	Mohini Bhardwaj	Tarah Chellevold
2002	Cleveland, Ohio	Ashley Postell	Courtney Kupets Tasha Schwikert	—N/a
2003	Milwaukee, Wisconsin	Hollie Vise	Ashley Postell	Courtney Kupets Nina Kim
2004	Nashville, Tennessee	Courtney Kupets	Carly Patterson	Carly Janiga
2005	Indianapolis, Indiana	Nastia Liukin	Chellsie Memmel	Alicia Sacramone
2006	Saint Paul, Minnesota	Nastia Liukin	Natasha Kelley	Jana Bieger
2007	San Jose, California	Shawn Johnson	Nastia Liukin	Alicia Sacramone
2008	Boston, Massachusetts	Nastia Liukin	Shawn Johnson	Alicia Sacramone
2009	Dallas, Texas	Ivana Hong	Samantha Peszek	Rebecca Bross
2010	Hartford, Connecticut	Rebecca Bross	Alicia Sacramone	Aly Raisman
2011	Saint Paul, Minnesota	Alicia Sacramone	Chellsie Memmel	Jordyn Wieber
2012	St. Louis, Missouri	Aly Raisman	Sarah Finnegan	Alicia Sacramone
2013	Hartford, Connecticut	Kyla Ross	Simone Biles	Kennedy Baker
2014	Pittsburgh, Pennsylvania	Kyla Ross	Simone Biles Alyssa Baumann	—N/a
2015	Indianapolis, Indiana	Simone Biles	Alyssa Baumann	Kyla Ross
2016	St. Louis, Missouri	Simone Biles	Aly Raisman	Laurie Hernandez
2017	Anaheim, California	Ragan Smith	Riley McCusker	Trinity Thomas
2018	Boston, Massachusetts	Simone Biles	Kara Eaker	Riley McCusker
2019	Kansas City, Missouri	Simone Biles	Kara Eaker	Leanne Wong
~~2020~~	~~Fort Worth, Texas~~	Canceled due to the COVID-19 pandemic in the USA		
2021	Fort Worth, Texas	Simone Biles	Sunisa Lee	Grace McCallum
2022	Tampa, Florida	Konnor McClain	Ciena Alipio	Kayla DiCello
2023	San Jose, California	Simone Biles	Skye Blakely	Sunisa Lee
2024	Fort Worth, Texas	Simone Biles	Sunisa Lee	Skye Blakely
2025	New Orleans, Louisiana	Hezly Rivera	Skye Blakely	Jayla Hang Dulcy Caylor
2026	Phoenix, Arizona	Hezly Rivera	Claire Pease	Caroline Moreau

=== Floor Exercise ===
Floor Exercise
Year	Location	Gold	Silver	Bronze
1986	Indianapolis, Indiana	Yolande Mavity	Tracy Calore	Hope Spivey
1987	Kansas City, Missouri	Kristie Phillips	Stacey Gunthrope	Missy Marlowe
1988	Houston, Texas	Phoebe Mills	Hope Spivey	Kelly Garrison
1989	Minneapolis, Minnesota	Brandy Johnson	Chelle Stack	Christy Henrich
1990	Denver, Colorado	Brandy Johnson	Kim Zmeskal	Kim Kelly
1991	Cincinnati, Ohio	Kerri Strug	Kim Zmeskal	Sandy Woolsey
1992	Columbus, Ohio	Kim Zmeskal	Kerri Strug	Hilary Grivich
1993	Salt Lake City, Utah	Shannon Miller	Dominique Dawes	Kerri Strug
1994	Nashville, Tennessee	Dominique Dawes	Shannon Miller	Amanda Borden
1995	New Orleans, Louisiana	Dominique Dawes	Dominique Moceanu	Shannon Miller
1996	Knoxville, Tennessee	Dominique Dawes	Kerri Strug	Jennie Thompson
1997	Denver, Colorado	Lindsay Wing	Dominique Moceanu	Kristen Maloney
1998	Indianapolis, Indiana	Vanessa Atler	Jamie Dantzscher	Dominique Moceanu
1999	Sacramento, California	Elise Ray	Morgan White	Monique Chang
2000	St. Louis, Missouri	Kristen Maloney	Elise Ray	Vanessa Atler
2001	Philadelphia, Pennsylvania	Tabitha Yim	Tasha Schwikert	Katie Heenan Rachel Tidd
2002	Cleveland, Ohio	Tasha Schwikert	Tabitha Yim	Samantha Sheehan Terin Humphrey
2003	Milwaukee, Wisconsin	Ashley Postell	Tia Orlando	Courtney Kupets Alicia Sacramone
2004	Nashville, Tennessee	Carly Patterson	Courtney McCool	Tia Orlando
2005	Indianapolis, Indiana	Alicia Sacramone	Nastia Liukin	Chellsie Memel
2006	Saint Paul, Minnesota	Randy Stageberg Alicia Sacramone	—N/a	Chellsie Memmel
2007	San Jose, California	Shawn Johnson	Bridget Sloan	Alicia Sacramone
2008	Boston, Massachusetts	Shawn Johnson	Alicia Sacramone	Mattie Larson
2009	Dallas, Texas	Bridget Sloan	Rebecca Bross	Kytra Hunter
2010	Hartford, Connecticut	Mattie Larson	Rebecca Bross	Aly Raisman
2011	Saint Paul, Minnesota	Jordyn Wieber	Rebecca Bross	Aly Raisman
2012	St. Louis, Missouri	Aly Raisman	Jordyn Wieber	Gabby Douglas
2013	Hartford, Connecticut	McKayla Maroney	Simone Biles	MyKayla Skinner
2014	Pittsburgh, Pennsylvania	Simone Biles	MyKayla Skinner	Maggie Nichols
2015	Indianapolis, Indiana	Aly Raisman	Simone Biles	MyKayla Skinner Bailie Key
2016	St. Louis, Missouri	Simone Biles	Aly Raisman	Laurie Hernandez MyKayla Skinner
2017	Anaheim, California	Ragan Smith	Jade Carey	Trinity Thomas
2018	Boston, Massachusetts	Simone Biles	Jade Carey	Morgan Hurd
2019	Kansas City, Missouri	Simone Biles	Jade Carey	Sunisa Lee
~~2020~~	~~Fort Worth, Texas~~	Canceled due to the COVID-19 pandemic in the USA		
2021	Fort Worth, Texas	Simone Biles	Kayla DiCello	Leanne Wong
2022	Tampa, Florida	Shilese Jones	Jade Carey	Jordan Chiles
2023	San Jose, California	Simone Biles	Kaliya Lincoln	Shilese Jones
2024	Fort Worth, Texas	Simone Biles	Kayla DiCello	Tiana Sumanasekera
2025	New Orleans, Louisiana	Hezly Rivera	Joscelyn Roberson	Ashlee Sullivan
2026	Phoenix, Arizona	Reese Esponda	Hezly Rivera	Jade Carey

== Senior Men's Medalists ==
=== All-Around ===
All-Around
Year	Location	Gold	Silver	Bronze
1986	Indianapolis, Indiana	Tim Daggett	Dan Hayden	Brian Babcock Dennis Hayden
1987	Kansas City, Missouri	Scott Johnson	Charles Lakes	Tim Daggett
1988	Houston, Texas	Dan Hayden	Kevin Davis	Charles Lakes
1989	Minneapolis, Minnesota	Tim Ryan	Lance Ringnald	Mike Racanelli
1990	Denver, Colorado	John Roethlisberger	Chris Waller	Lance Ringnald
1991	Cincinnati, Ohio	Chris Waller	Patrick Kirksey Chainey Umphrey	—N/a
1992	Columbus, Ohio	John Roethlisberger	Scott Keswick	Tim Ryan
1993	Salt Lake City, Utah	John Roethlisberger	Chainey Umphrey	Scott Keswick
1994	Nashville, Tennessee	Scott Keswick	Bill Roth	Stephen McCain
1995	New Orleans, Louisiana	John Roethlisberger	Mihai Bagiu	Blaine Wilson
1996	Knoxville, Tennessee	John Roethlisberger	Blaine Wilson	John Macready
1997	Denver, Colorado	Blaine Wilson	Jason Gatson	John Macready
1998	Indianapolis, Indiana	Blaine Wilson	Jason Gatson	Jay Thornton
1999	Sacramento, California	Blaine Wilson	John Roethlisberger	Brett McClure
2000	St. Louis, Missouri	Blaine Wilson	Sean Townsend	Paul Hamm
2001	Philadelphia, Pennsylvania	Sean Townsend	Brett McClure	Stephen McCain
2002	Cleveland, Ohio	Paul Hamm	Blaine Wilson	Guard Young
2003	Milwaukee, Wisconsin	Paul Hamm	Jason Gatson	Blaine Wilson
2004	Nashville, Tennessee	Paul Hamm	Brett McClure	Morgan Hamm
2005	Indianapolis, Indiana	Todd Thornton	David Sender	David Durante
2006	Saint Paul, Minnesota	Alexander Artemev	Jonathan Horton	Guillermo Alvarez
2007	San Jose, California	David Durante	Guillermo Alvarez	Sho Nakamori
2008	Houston, Texas	David Sender	Jonathan Horton	Joseph Hagerty
2009	Dallas, Texas	Jonathan Horton	Tim McNeill	Wesley Haagensen
2010	Hartford, Connecticut	Jonathan Horton	Danell Leyva	Brandon Wynn
2011	Saint Paul, Minnesota	Danell Leyva	Jonathan Horton	Steven Legendre
2012	St. Louis, Missouri	John Orozco	Danell Leyva	Sam Mikulak
2013	Hartford, Connecticut	Sam Mikulak	Alexander Naddour	Jake Dalton
2014	Pittsburgh, Pennsylvania	Sam Mikulak	John Orozco	Jake Dalton
2015	Indianapolis, Indiana	Sam Mikulak	Donnell Whittenburg	Chris Brooks
2016	Hartford, Connecticut	Sam Mikulak	Chris Brooks	Jake Dalton
2017	Anaheim, California	Yul Moldauer	Allan Bower	Donnell Whittenburg
2018	Boston, Massachusetts	Sam Mikulak	Yul Moldauer	Allan Bower
2019	Kansas City, Missouri	Sam Mikulak	Yul Moldauer	Akash Modi
~~2020~~	~~Fort Worth, Texas~~	Canceled due to the COVID-19 pandemic in the USA		
2021	Fort Worth, Texas	Brody Malone	Yul Moldauer	Sam Mikulak
2022	Tampa, Florida	Brody Malone	Donnell Whittenburg	Asher Hong
2023	San Jose, California	Asher Hong	Khoi Young	Fred Richard
2024	Fort Worth, Texas	Brody Malone	Fred Richard	Khoi Young
2025	New Orleans, Louisiana	Asher Hong	Fred Richard	Fuzzy Benas
2026	Phoenix, Arizona	Fred Richard	Shane Wiskus	Danila Leykin

== Junior Women's Medalists ==
=== All-Around ===
All-Around
Year	Location	Gold	Silver	Bronze
1986	Indianapolis, Indiana	Kristie Phillips	Phoebe Mill	Robin Lynn Carter
1987	Kansas City, Missouri	Chelle Stack	Missy Marlowe	Juliette Bangerter
1988	Houston, Texas			
1989	Minneapolis, Minnesota			
1990	Denver, Colorado	Hilary Grivich	Larissa Fontaine	Dominique Dawes
1991	Cincinnati, Ohio	Anne Woynerowski	Kristin Mcdermott	Gwen Spidle
1992	Columbus, Ohio	Lanna Apisukh	Kristy Powell	Sarah Cain
1993	Salt Lake City, Utah	Jenny Thompson	Tanya Maiers	Sani Meduna
1994	Nashville, Tennessee	Dominique Moceanu	Danielle Thompson	Mary Beth Arnold
1995	New Orleans, Louisiana	Mina Kim	Vanessa Atler	Alexis Brion
1996	Knoxville, Tennessee	Vanessa Atler	Alexis Brion	Kelly Parkinson
1997	Denver, Colorado	Elise Ray	Marline Stephens	Sierra Spunar
1998	Indianapolis, Indiana	Morgan White	Ashley Postell	Kristal Uzelac
1999	Sacramento, California	Kristal Uzelac	Tabitha Yim	Ashley Postell
2000	St. Louis, Missouri	Kristal Uzelac	Terin Humphrey	Tabitha Yim
2001	Philadelphia, Pennsylvania	Kristal Uzelac	Hollie Vise	Carly Patterson
2002	Cleveland, Ohio	Carly Patterson	Hollie Vise	Chellsie Memmel
2003	Milwaukee, Wisconsin	Nastia Liukin	Courtney McCool	Ashley Priess
2004	Nashville, Tennessee	Nastia Liukin	Shayla Worley	Jana Bieger
2005	Indianapolis, Indiana	Natasha Kelley	Bianca Flohr	Shayla Worley
2006	Saint Paul, Minnesota	Shawn Johnson	Bianca Flohr	Samantha Peszek
2007	San Jose, California	Rebecca Bross	Samantha Shapiro	Jordyn Wieber
2008	Boston, Massachusetts	Jordyn Wieber	Samantha Shapiro	Cassie Whitcomb
2009	Dallas, Texas	Kyla Ross	Bridgette Caquatto	Alexandra Raisman
2010	Hartford, Connecticut	Kyla Ross	Katelyn Ohashi	McKayla Maroney
2011	Saint Paul, Minnesota	Katelyn Ohashi	Kyla Ross	Sarah Finnegan
2012	St. Louis, Missouri	Lexie Priessman	Madison Desch	Simone Biles
2013	Hartford, Connecticut	Bailie Key	Laurie Hernandez	Amelia Hundley
2014	Pittsburgh, Pennsylvania	Jazmyn Foberg	Nia Dennis	Norah Flatley
2015	Indianapolis, Indiana	Laurie Hernandez	Jazmyn Foberg	Ragan Smith
2016	St. Louis, Missouri	Maile O'Keefe	Riley McCusker	Gabby Perea
2017	Anaheim, California	Maile O'Keefe	Emma Malabuyo	Kara Eaker
2018	Boston, Massachusetts	Leanne Wong	Kayla DiCello	Sunisa Lee
2019	Kansas City, Missouri	Kayla DiCello	Konnor McClain	Olivia Greaves
~~2020~~	~~Fort Worth, Texas~~	Canceled due to the COVID-19 pandemic in the USA		
2021	Fort Worth, Texas	Katelyn Jong	Madray Johnson	Kaliya Lincoln
2022	Tampa, Florida	Madray Johnson	Jayla Hang	Alicia Zhou
2023	San Jose, California	Hezly Rivera	Kieryn Finnell	Izzy Stassi
2024	Fort Worth, Texas	Claire Pease	Gabrielle Hardie	Addy Fulcher Camie Westerman
2025	New Orleans, Louisiana	Caroline Moreau	Isabella Anzola	Amia Pugh-Banks
2026	Phoenix, Arizona	Addalye VanGrinsven	Kylie Smith	Amia Pugh-Banks
