= Gymnastics at the 1995 Pan American Games =

- Gymnastics pictograms
- Venue: Estadio Polideportivo Chapadmalal
- Start date: March 11, 1995
- End date: March 26, 1995
- No. of events: 21 (8 men, 13 women)
- Competitors: 137 from 16 nations

The gymnastics competition at the 1995 Pan American Games was held from March 11 to March 26 in Mar del Plata, Argentina at Estadio Polideportivo Chapadmalal.

== Medal summary ==
=== Medal table ===
Place	Nation	Gold medal	Silver medal	Bronze medal	Total
1	United States	10	13	5	28
2	Cuba	9	7	6	22
3	Argentina	1	1	4	6
4	Venezuela	1	0	0	1
5	Puerto Rico	0	1	0	1
6	Canada	0	0	4	4
7	Brazil	0	0	1	1
Total		21	22	20	63

=== Artistic gymnastics ===
==== Men's events ====
Games	Gold	Silver	Bronze
Team all-around	United States; Mihai Bagiu; Stephen McCain; John Roethlisberger; Bill Roth; Kip Simons; Chainey Umphrey; Chris Waller	Cuba; Felix Anguilera; Francisco Diaz; Abel Driggs; Yoel Gutierrez; Lazaro Lamelas; Erick López; Damian Merino	Canada; Kristan Burley; Jason Hardabura; Richard Ikeda; Alan Nolet; Jason Papp; Travis Romagnoli; Peter Schmid
Individual all-around	Erick López; Cuba	John Roethlisberger; United States	Lazaro Lamelas; Cuba
Floor exercise	Damian Merino; Cuba	Bill Roth; United States	Kristan Burley; Canada
Pommel horse	Erick López; Cuba	Mihai Bagiu; United States	Richard Ikeda; Canada
Rings	Damian Merino; Cuba	John Roethlisberger; United States	Erick López; Cuba
Vault	Victor Solorzano; Venezuela	Lazaro Lamelas; Cuba	Kristan Burley; Canada
Parallel bars	Erick López; Cuba	Lazaro Lamelas; Cuba	Isidro Ibarrondo; Argentina
Horizontal bar	John Roethlisberger; United States	Victor Colon Ortíz; Puerto Rico Bill Roth; United States	—N/a

==== Women's events ====
Event	Gold	Silver	Bronze
Team all-around	United States; Mary Beth Arnold; Amanda Borden; Amy Chow; Shannon Miller; Kristy Powell; Katie Teft; Doni Thompson	Cuba; Yureysis Bermudez; Mayludis Bombino; Lisandra Cadeson; Leyanet Gonzalez; Lidia Hildago; Arazay Jova; Annia Portuondo	Argentina; Ariadna Argoitia; Laura Alvarez; Ana Destefano; Nancy Diorio; Romina Mazzoni; Romina Plataroti; Aldana Simone
Individual all-around	Shannon Miller (USA)	Amanda Borden (USA)	Amy Chow (USA)
Vault	Amy Chow (USA)	Shannon Miller (USA)	Annia Portuondo (CUB)
Uneven bars	Shannon Miller (USA)	Amy Chow (USA)	Annia Portuondo (CUB)
Balance beam	Amanda Borden (USA)	Annia Portuondo (CUB)	Leyanet González (CUB)
Floor exercise	Shannon Miller (USA)	Amanda Borden (USA)	Leyanet González (CUB)

=== Rhythmic gymnastics ===
==== Individual ====
Event	Gold	Silver	Bronze
Individual all-around	Yordania Corrales (CUB)	Tamara Levinson (USA)	Jessica Davis (USA)
Team all-around	United States	Cuba	Argentina
Ball	Alejandra Unsain (ARG)	Cecilia Schtutman (ARG)	Tamara Levinson (USA)
Clubs	Yordania Corrales (CUB)	Jessica Davis (USA)	Tamara Levinson (USA)
Ribbon	Tamara Levinson (USA)	Jessica Davis (USA)	Luciana Eslava (ARG)
Rope	Yordania Corrales (CUB)	Kirenia Ruiz (CUB)	Tamara Levinson (USA)

==== Group ====
Event	Gold	Silver	Bronze
Group all-around	Cuba	United States	Brazil; Camila Ferezin; Dayane Camilo; Fernanda Festa; Luciana Barrichello; Luciane de Oliveira

== Men's artistic results ==
=== Team ===
RANK	TEAM	SCORE
Gold medal	United States; Mihai Bagiu; Stephen McCain; John Roethlisberger; Bill Roth; Kip Simons; Chainey Umphrey; Chris Waller	551.150
Silver medal	Cuba; Felix Anguilera; Francisco Diaz; Abel Driggs; Yoel Gutierrez; Lazaro Lamelas; Erick López; Damian Merino	550.900
Bronze medal	Canada; Kristan Burley; Jason Hardabura; Richard Ikeda; Alan Nolet; Jason Papp; Travis Romagnoli; Peter Schmid	546.100
4.	Argentina; Sebastian Alvarez; Sergio Alvarino; Higinio de la Berrera; Isidro Ibarrondo; Fernando Menghi; Marcelo Palacio; Gustavo Pisos	524.550
5.	Mexico; Heriberto Arellano; Jose Bolano; Carlos Garcia; Luis Garcia; Eduardo Haro; Francisco Lopez; Andres Sanchez	521.600
6.	Puerto Rico; Gabriel Chevere; Juan Carlos Colon; Victor Colon Ortíz; Carlos Latorre; Diego Lizardi; Joseph Rodriguez; Hector Tanco	512.100
7.	Brazil; Cesar DaSilva; Adriano Engelke; Gilberto Figueira; Kenzo Koshimura; Jose Mario Marzagao; Marco Monteiro; Fabricio Olsson	507.150

=== All-around ===
RANK	GYMNAST	SCORE
Gold medal	Erick López (CUB)	56.375
Silver medal	John Roethlisberger (USA)	55.725
Bronze medal	Lazaro Lamelas (CUB)	55.400
4.	Damian Merino (CUB)	55.350
5.	Kristan Burley (CAN)	54.925
6.	Peter Schmid (CAN)	54.450
7.	Stephen McCain (USA)	54.300
8.	Mihai Bagiu (USA)	54.150
9.	Diego Lizardi (PUR)	53.375
10.	Isidro Ibarrondo (ARG)	53.175
11.	Travis Romagnoli (CAN)	52.800
11.	Victor Colon Ortíz (CUB)	52.800
13.	Marco Monteiro (BRA)	52.750
14.	Jose Mario Marzagao (BRA)	52.650
15.	Marcelo Palacio (ARG)	52.625
16.	Eduardo Haro (MEX)	51.800
17.	Fabricio Olsson (BRA)	51.375
18.	Jose Solano (MEX)	51.100
19.	Sebastian Alvarez (ARG)	50.950
20.	Andreas Sanchez (MEX)	50.175
21.	Manuel Begarano (VEN)	50.125
22.	Milciades Santiago (DOM)	49.525
23.	Alexander Rangel Pineda (COL)	49.150
24.	Gabriel Chevere (PUR)	41.650

=== Floor exercise ===
RANK	GYMNAST	SCORE
Gold medal	Damian Merino (CUB)	9.625
Silver medal	Bill Roth (USA)	9.500
Bronze medal	Kristan Burley (CAN)	9.487
4.	Fernando Menghi (ARG)	9.275
5.	Travis Romagnoli (CAN)	9.200
6.	Erick López (CUB)	9.125
7.	Marcelo Palacio (ARG)	9.075
8.	John Roethlisberger (USA)	8.750

=== Pommel horse ===
RANK	GYMNAST	SCORE
Gold medal	Erick López (CUB)	9.450
Silver medal	Mihai Bagiu (USA)	9.350
Bronze medal	Richard Ikeda (CAN)	9.300
4.	John Roethlisberger (USA)	9.275
5.	Jason Hardabura (CAN)	9.100
6.	Gabriel Chevere (PUR)	9.050
7.	Abel Driggs (CUB)	8.725
8.	Hignio de la Berrera (ARG)	8.625

=== Rings ===
RANK	GYMNAST	SCORE
Gold medal	Damian Merino (CUB)	9.725
Silver medal	John Roethlisberger (USA)	9.550
Bronze medal	Erick López (CUB)	9.500
4.	Alan Molet (CAN)	9.325
5.	Diego Lizardi (PUR)	9.275
5.	Sergio Alvarino (ARG)	9.275
7.	Chris Waller (USA)	9.075
8.	Isidro Ibarrondo (ARG)	8.875

=== Vault ===
RANK	GYMNAST	SCORE
Gold medal	Victor Solorzano (VEN)	9.593
Silver medal	Lazaro Lamelas (CUB)	9.462
Bronze medal	Kristan Burley (CAN)	9.450
4.	Stephen McCain (USA)	9.387
5.	Peter Schmid (CAN)	9.275
6.	John Roethlisberger (USA)	9.087
7.	Diego Lizardi (PUR)	9.037
8.	Eduardo Haro (MEX)	8.887

=== Parallel bars ===
RANK	GYMNAST	SCORE
Gold medal	Erick López (CUB)	9.425
Silver medal	Lazaro Lamelas (CUB)	9.275
Bronze medal	Isidro Ibarrondo (ARG)	9.250
4.	Alan Nolet (CAN)	9.125
5.	Kristan Burley (CAN)	9.025
6.	Eduardo Haro (MEX)	9.000
7.	Bill Roth (USA)	8.900
8.	John Roethlisberger (USA)	8.425

=== Horizontal bar ===
RANK	GYMNAST	SCORE
Gold medal	John Roethlisberger (USA)	9.275
Silver medal	Bill Roth (USA)	9.200
Silver medal	Victor Colon Ortíz (PUR)	9.487
4.	Lazaro Lamelas (CUB)	9.175
5.	Felix Aguilera (CUB)	9.150
6.	Diego Lizardi (PUR)	9.100
7.	Jason Papp (CAN)	9.025
8.	Peter Schmid (USA)	8.825

== Women's artistic results ==
=== Team ===
RANK	TEAM	SCORE
Gold medal	United States; Mary Beth Arnold; Amanda Borden; Amy Chow; Shannon Miller; Kristy Powell; Katie Teft; Doni Thompson	388.475
Silver medal	Cuba; Yureisy Bermudez; Mayludis Bombino; Lisandra Cadeson; Leyanet Gonzalez; Lidia Hildago; Arazay Jova; Annia Portuondo	369.125
Bronze medal	Argentina; Ariadna Argoitia; Laura Alvarez; Ana Destefano; Nancy Diorio; Romina Mazzoni; Romina Plataroti; Aldana Simone	368.450
4.	Brazil; Soraya Carvalho; Mariana Goncalvez; Grazziella Emy Guerra; Keli Tiemi Kitaura; Roberto Osorio; Luisa Parente; Adriana Silami	356.875
5.	Canada; Natalie Barrington; Lena Degteva; Jennifer Exaltacion; Jaime Hill; Shanyn MacEachern; Marleen Lavoie; Theresa Wolf	337.950
6.	Bolivia; Lidia Antelo; Jimena Hurtado; Vera Maturana; Veronica Maturana; Maria Ines Mendez; Maria Andrea Velazquez	292.825

=== All-around ===
RANK	GYMNAST	SCORE
Gold medal	Shannon Miller (USA)	38.587
Silver medal	Amanda Borden (USA)	38.575
Bronze medal	Amy Chow (USA)	38.375
4.	Annia Portuondo (CUB)	37.600
5.	Romina Plataroti (ARG)	37.450
6.	Jennifer Exaltacion (CAN)	37.275
7.	Soraya Carvalho (BRA)	37.212
8.	Shanyn MacEachern (CAN)	37.150
9.	Romina Mazzoni (ARG)	37.012
10.	Ana Destefano (ARG)	36.987
11.	Eileen Díaz (PUR)	36.875
12.	Leyanet Gonzalez (CUB)	36.650
13.	Marleen Lavoie (CAN)	36.350
14.	Yureisy Bermudez (CUB)	35.850
15.	Mariana Goncalvez (BRA)	35.437
16.	Rocio Salazar (GUA)	34.362
17.	Adriana Silami (BRA)	34.325
18.	Yaritza Yulian (PUR)	33.675
19.	Veronica Maturana (BOL)	33.075
20.	Jimena Hurtado (BOL)	31.600
21.	Vera Maturana (BOL)	28.975
22.	Olivia Bogarin (PAR)	19.225

=== Vault ===
RANK	GYMNAST	SCORE
Gold medal	Amy Chow (USA)	9.718
Silver medal	Shannon Miller (USA)	9.706
Bronze medal	Annia Portuondo (CUB)	9.662
4.	Shanyn MacEachern (CAN)	9.443
5.	Azaray Jova (CUB)	9.381
6.	Ana Destefano (ARG)	9.325
7.	Soraya Carvalho (BRA)	9.193
8.	Romina Plataroti (ARG)	8.850

=== Uneven bars ===
RANK	GYMNAST	SCORE
Gold medal	Shannon Miller (USA)	9.812
Silver medal	Amy Chow (USA)	9.725
Bronze medal	Annia Portuondo (CUB)	9.650
4.	Eileen Díaz (PUR)	9.587
5.	Romina Mazzoni (ARG)	9.312
5.	Soraya Carvalho (BRA)	9.312
7.	Lena Degteva (CAN)	9.187
8.	Ana Destefano (ARG)	8.887

=== Balance beam ===
RANK	GYMNAST	SCORE
Gold medal	Amanda Borden (USA)	9.612
Silver medal	Annia Portuondo (CUB)	9.600
Bronze medal	Leyanet Gonzalez (CUB)	9.500
4.	Katie Teft (USA)	9.487
5.	Soraya Carvalho (BRA)	9.450
6.	Jennifer Exaltacion (CAN)	9.012
7.	Marleen Lavoie (CAN)	8.562
8.	Romina Plataroti (ARG)	8.337

=== Floor exercise ===
RANK	GYMNAST	SCORE
Gold medal	Shannon Miller (USA)	9.812
Silver medal	Amanda Borden (USA)	9.787
Bronze medal	Leyanet Gonzalez (CUB)	9.387
4.	Jennifer Exaltacion (CAN)	9.375
5.	Annia Portuondo (CUB)	9.187
6.	Romina Plataroti (ARG)	8.850
7.	Ana Destefano (ARG)	8.775
8.	Soraya Carvalho (BRA)	8.725

== See also ==
- Pan American Gymnastics Championships
- South American Gymnastics Championships
- Gymnastics at the 1996 Summer Olympics
