= 1990 Junior Pan American Artistic Gymnastics Championships =

International sports competition

Junior Pan American Artistic Gymnastics Championships
- Location: Tallahassee, United States
- Date: June 16–23, 1990

The 1990 Junior Pan American Gymnastics Championships was held in Tallahassee, United States, June 16–23, 1990.

== Medal summary ==
=== Junior division ===
Event	Gold	Silver	Bronze
Women
Team	United States; Kerri Strug; Dominique Dawes; Sarah Balogach	Argentina; Karina Oliveira; Romina Plataroti; Andrea Giordano	Canada; Sarah Rainey; Jacqui Walton
All-Around	Kerri Strug (USA)	Dominique Dawes (USA)	Sarah Balogach (USA)
Vault	Denisse Lopez (MEX)	Karina Oliveira (ARG)	Romina Plataroti (ARG)
Uneven bars	Kerri Strug (USA)	Dominique Dawes (USA)	Viviane Cardoso (BRA)
Balance beam	Kerri Strug (USA)	Sarah Rainey (CAN)	Jacqui Walton (CAN)
Floor exercise	Dominique Dawes (USA)	Kerri Strug (USA)	Romina Plataroti (ARG)
Men
Team	Canada; Kris Burley; Darren Bersuk	Mexico; Andres Sanchez	Puerto Rico; Francisco Suarez; Diego Lizardi
All-Around	Sanaisky Torres (CUB)	Andres Sanchez (MEX)	Kris Burley (CAN)
Floor exercise	Andres Sanchez (MEX)	Kris Burley (CAN)	Francisco Suarez (PUR) Darren Bersuk (CAN)
Pommel horse	Sanaisky Torres (CUB)	Kris Burley (CAN)	Gustavo Pisos (ARG)
Rings	Sanaisky Torres (CUB)	Andres Sanchez (MEX)	Casey Bryan (USA)
Vault	Kris Burley (CAN)	Sanaisky Torres (CUB)	Francisco Suarez (PUR)
Parallel bars	Sanaisky Torres (CUB)	Pablo de Lazari (ARG)	José Berbuto (BRA)
Horizontal bar	Sanaisky Torres (CUB)	Casey Bryan (USA)	Andres Sanchez (MEX)

- The United States men's team was disqualified after age-eligibility issues and gymnasts Mark Booth, Rick Kieffer, Rob Kieffer were deemed not eligible for medals. Only Casey Bryan was allowed to stay in the competition and advance to the event finals.

=== Children's division ===
Event	Gold	Silver	Bronze
Women
Team	Cuba; Annia Portuondo; Leyanet Calero	Canada; Jenny Chung; Teresa Wolf; Lauren Domenichini	United States; Amy Shelton; Sadie Tucker; Brandi Gonzalez
All-Around	Annia Portuondo (CUB)	Leyanet Calero (CUB)	Jenny Chung (USA)
Vault	Annia Portuondo (CUB)	Leyanet Calero (CUB)	Amy Shelton (USA)
Uneven bars	Annia Portuondo (CUB)	Amy Shelton (USA) Lauren Domenichini (CAN)	—
Balance beam	Annia Portuondo (CUB)	Leyanet Calero (CUB)	Jenny Chung (CAN)
Floor exercise	Annia Portuondo (CUB)	Teresa Wolf (CAN)	Soraya Carvalho (BRA)
Men
Team	United States; Duane Holland; Gewin Sincharoen	Canada; Travis Romagnoli; Darcy Wittenberg; Tim Logan	Argentina; Patricio Mantano; Lucas Devs; Ricardo Schuager
All-Around	Adonis Guzman (CUB)	Duane Holland (USA)	Travis Romagnoli (CAN)
Floor exercise	Duane Holland (USA)	Adonis Guzman (CUB)	Travis Romagnoli (CAN)
Pommel horse	Travis Romagnoli (CAN)	Gewin Sincharoen (USA)	Adonis Guzman (CUB)
Rings	Adonis Guzman (CUB) Duane Holland (USA)	—	Travis Romagnoli (CAN)
Vault	Adonis Guzman (CUB)	Duane Holland (USA)	Kleber Sato (BRA)
Parallel bars	Adonis Guzman (CUB)	Claudio Junior (BRA)	Gewin Sincharoen (USA)
Horizontal bar	Adonis Guzman (CUB)	Gewin Sincharoen (USA)	Duane Holland (USA)

- Casey Bryan from the United States originally competed at the Children's division and placed second in the individual all-around, but he was subsequently moved to the Junior division and his scores were not considered for the team and individual all-around competitions at the Children's division. The reallocation caused him to place 10th all-around in the Junior division.
