= List of sports terms named after people =

This is a list of eponyms in sports, i.e. sports terms named after people.

== American football ==
- Peanut Punch: In the National Football League a defensive act of knocking the ball out of the offensive players hold. Named after Charles Tillman nicknamed Peanut and is the player most associated with this move.
- Rooney Rule: a National Football League policy that requires league teams to interview ethnic-minority candidates for head coaching and senior football operation jobs. Named after Dan Rooney, the former owner of the Pittsburgh Steelers and chairman of the NFL's diversity committee when the policy was created in 2003.

== Artistic gymnastics ==
- Alvarez (horizontal bar) – double salto fwd. str. with 1/1 or 3/2 t., after Guillermo Alvarez (US)
- Amanar (vault) – Yurchenko family vault, roundoff on and 2 1/2 twists off, after Simona Amânar (Romania)
- Araújo (balance beam (dismount)) – salto forward stretched with 2 twist, after Heine Araújo (Brazil)
- Belyavskiy (parallel bars) – double front salto dismount in piked position, after David Belyavskiy (Russia)
- Blanik (vault) – handspring forward on – double piked salto forward off, after Polish artistic gymnast Leszek Blanik (Poland)
- Borden (balance beam) – straddled piked jump from a side position or split jump done on balance beam with 1/2 or 3/4 turn, after Amanda Borden (US)
- Bhardwaj (uneven bars) – a backward flip (Pak salto) on the high bar with full-twist and then catches the low bar, after Mohini Bhardwaj (US)
- Bhavsar (parallel bars) – swing forward, straddle cut backward, and regrasp with straight body at horizontal, after Raj Bhavsar (US)
- Bhavsar (still rings) – pull with straight body and arms through moment. front lever to swallow (2s.), added to Code of Points in 2001 and removed in 2021, after Raj Bhavsar (US)
- Bi turn (uneven bars) – after Bi Wenjing (China)
- Biles (floor exercise) – double layout with 1/2 turn, after Simone Biles (US)
- Biles 2 (floor exercise) – triple-twisting double back tucked somersault, after Simone Biles (US)
- Biles (vault) — Yurchenko 1/2 on into laid-out salto with 2/1 twists off, after Simone Biles (US)
- Biles (balance beam (dismount)) – double-twisting double back tucked somersault, after Simone Biles (US)
- Biles 2 (vault) — Yurchenko on into double piked somersault off, originated at the 2021 U.S. Classic and successfully done at the 2023 Artistic Gymnastics World Championships in Antwerp, Belgium, after Simone Biles (US)
- Brause (uneven bars) – done from low bar facing away from high bar with a cast to front salto forward and catching bar, after Doris Fuchs-Brause (US)
- Bretschneider (horizontal bar) – release with double-twisting double back tucked over bar before regrasp, after Andreas Bretschneider (Germany)
- Bryan (pommel horse) – scissor fwd. with 1/4 t. through handstand on 1 pommel, lower to support with straddle legs on the other arm (with legs changing), after Casey Bryan (US)
- Bulimar (floor exercise) – a Johnson leap (switch leap with 1/4 turn to side position) with additional full turn, after Diana Bulimar (Romania)
- Burkhart (pommel horse) – any 3/3 travel in flairs with 1/1 Spindle inside 2 circles, after Taylor Burkhart (US)
- Čáslavská (uneven bars) – from front support on high bar, swing backward with release and 1/1 turn (360°) to hang on high bar, after Věra Čáslavská (Czechoslovakia)
- Cassina (horizontal bar) – full-twisting double layout or straight Kolman somersault over bar, after Igor Cassina (Italy)
- Cheng (vault) – Yurchenko 1/2 on into 1 1/2 twists off, after Cheng Fei (China)
- Chusovitina (floor exercise) – full-twisting double layout salto, after Oksana Chusovitina (USSR, Germany, Uzbekistan)
- Chusovitina (vault) – handspring forward on – piked salto with full twist off, after Oksana Chusovitina (USSR, Germany, Uzbekistan)
- Chusovitina 2 (vault) - handspring forward on - laid out salto with 1 1/2 twist off, after Oksana Chusovitina (USSR, Germany, Uzbekistan)
- Chow–Khorkina or Khorkina–Chow (uneven bars) – Stalder 1 1/2 pirouette, after Amy Chow [US, also first performed by Svetlana Khorkina (Russia)]
- Chow 2 (uneven bars) – Stalder to Shaposhnikova, after Amy Chow (US)
- Comaneci salto (uneven bars) – front support on high bar, cast with salto forward straddle to hang on high bar, after Nadia Comăneci (Romania)
- Conner (parallel bars) – straddle L-sit on one rail with 180° or 360° turn, added to Code of Points in 1993 and removed in 2000, after Bart Conner (US)
- Daggett (pommel horse) – scissor backward with 1/2 counterturn, added to Code of Points in 1989 and removed in 2000, after Tim Daggett (US)
- Dalton (parallel bars) – roll backward with 1/2 t. tuck to hang, after Jacob Dalton (US)
- Dawes (uneven bars) – back giant with 1 1/2 turn in handstand, after Dominique Dawes (US)
- Derwael–Fenton (uneven bars) – backward stalder with counter straddle reverse hecht over the high bar with half (180-degree) turn to hang in mixed L-grip, after Nina Derwael (BE) and Georgia-Mae Fenton (UK)
- Diomidov (parallel bars) – swing forward with a full turn on one arm to handstand, after Sergei Diomidov (USSR)
- Dos Santos (floor exercise) – Arabian double pike (1/2 turn to double front somersault in piked position), after Daiane dos Santos (Brazil)
- Dos Santos 2 (floor exercise) – Arabian double layout (1/2 turn to double front somersault laid out position), after Daiane dos Santos (Brazil)
- Dowell (floor exercise) - front double piked salto Brenna Dowell (US)
- Downie (Uneven bars) - stalder backward on high bar with counter pike – reverse hecht over high bar to hang, after Rebecca Downie (Great Britain)
- Drăgulescu (vault) – handspring double front tucked somersault with 1/2 turn, after Marian Drăgulescu (Romania)
- Drăgulescu piked (vault) – officially named the Ri Se Gwang 2 originated by Ri Se Gwang of North Korea; use of Drăgulescu piked when referring to this skill is often preferred in practice because of how well-known the regular Drăgulescu is; one of only five vaults with top official D-score of 6.0; variant of the Drăgulescu where only difference is saltos done in piked position, after Marian Drăgulescu (România) and Ri Se Gwang of North Korea
- Erceg (balance beam (mount)) – round off Arabian front tuck onto the end of the beam, after Tina Erceg (Croatia)
- Fan (uneven bars (dismount)) - from L-grip swing backwards, 1/2 (180 degree) turn to double salto Fan Yilin (China)
- Ferrari (floor exercise) – a ring tour jete with 1/2 turn and a landing on both feet, after Vanessa Ferrari (Italy)
- Fontaine (uneven bars dismount) – double somersaulting dismount is a back tuck with 1/2 twist into a front tuck, after Larissa Fontaine (US)
- Galante (balance beam) – 1 1/2 turns with leg held in split position, after Paola Galante (Italy)
- Garrison (floor exercise) – cat leap forward with bent legs and 1 1/2 turn, after Kelly Garrison (US)
- Garrison (balance beam) – free shoulder roll forward to stand or tuck stand without hand support, after Kelly Garrison (US)
- Garrison 2 (balance beam) – from an extended tuck sit, Valdez swing over backward through horizontal with one-arm support, after Kelly Garrison (US)
- Garrison 3 (balance beam) – round-off, tucked full mount, after Kelly Garrison (US)
- Gatson 1 (parallel bars) – swing bwd. with 1/1 t. hop to handstand, after Jason Gatson (US)
- Gatson 2 (parallel bars) – Gatson 1 with 1/4 t to handstand on 1 rail and 1/4 t. handstand on 2 rails, after Jason Gatson (US)
- Gaylord 1 (horizontal bar) – salto fwd, tuck over the bar, also from el-grip, after Mitch Gaylord (US)
- Gaylord 2 (horizontal bar) – salto bwd. 1/2 t. piked over the bar, after Mitch Gaylord (US)
- Gebeshian (uneven bars) – 360° turn from low to high bar known as a full twisting jump Hecht mount (uneven bars), after Houry Gebeshian (Armenia)
- Gienger salto (horizontal bar) – after Eberhard Gienger (Germany)
- Gienger salto (uneven bars) – after Eberhard Gienger (Germany)
- Ginsberg (parallel bars) – giant swing fw. to hdst., added to Code of Points in 1989 and removed in 2000, after Brian Ginsberg (US)
- Gómez (floor exercise) – quadruple spin, after Elena Gómez (Spain)
- Grigoraş (balance beam) – after Cristina Elena Grigoraş (Romania)
- Hayden (horizontal bar) – double salto bwd. str. w. 1/1 t. over the bar, after Dan Hayden (US)
- Henrich (balance beam) – a stag-split, split-leap or jump forward with 1/2 turn, landing on both feet or in a one-two step-out or a split jump in side position with bending of rear leg backward upward that starts from a cross stand, after Christy Henrich (US)
- Hindorff (uneven bars) – clear hip circle to immediate Tkatchev release, after Sylvia Hindorff (East Germany)
- Huang (uneven bars) – a stalder forward in L-grip with full turn to handstand, initiated on one arm before handstand, after Huang Qiushuang (China)
- Humphrey (floor exercise) – switch split leap forward with a 1/4 turn to side split leap or straddle pike position, after Terin Humphrey (US)
- Humphrey (balance beam/floor exercise) – 2 1/2 turn (900°) on one leg, in tuck stand, with free leg optional, after Terin Humphrey (US)
- Hypolito (floor exercise) – Arabian double pike with a full twist, after Diego Hypólito (Brazil)
- Jäger salto (horizontal bar, uneven bars) – swing backwards and salto forwards to catch high bar again, after Bernd Jäger (East Germany)
- Janz salto (uneven bars) – after Karin Janz (East Germany)
- Johnson (floor exercise) – a switch-split leap forward with leg change and 1/4 turn to side split leap or straddle pike position, after Brandy Johnson (US)
- Jones (floor exercise) - a triple turn with leg held at horizontal, after Shilese Jones
- Kasamatsu (vault) – after Shigero Kasamatsu (Japan)
- Kim (floor exercise) – double tucked back salto, after Nellie Kim (USSR)
- Kim-Shirai or Shirai-Kim (vault) – round-off—back-handspring (Yurchenko) triple full layout, after Kim Hee Hoon (South Korea) and Kenzo Shirai (Japan)
- Khorkina (uneven bars) – back uprise and straddle flight over high bar with 1/2 turn to hang, after Svetlana Khorkina (Russia)
- Khorkina 2 (uneven bars) – low bar inner front support, clear hip circle to handstand 1/2 turn in flight to high bar hang, after Svetlana Khorkina (Russia)
- Khorkina (balance beam) – gainer back-handspring with full twist before hand support, after Svetlana Khorkina (Russia)
- Khorkina 2 (balance beam (dismount)) – gainer 2 1/2-twisting back layout dismount to side or at the end of beam, after Svetlana Khorkina (Russia)
- Khorkina 3 (balance beam (dismount)) – gainer triple-twisting back layout dismount to side or at the end of beam, after Svetlana Khorkina (Russia)
- Khorkina-Chow or Chow-Khorkina (uneven bars) – Stalder 1 1/2 pirouette, after Svetlana Khorkina (Russia, also first performed by Amy Chow (US))
- Khorkina (floor exercise) – hop with 1 1/2 turns to front lying support, after Svetlana Khorkina (Russia)
- Khorkina (vault) – round-off, back-handspring with 1/2 turn on, 1/2 turn into back pike off, after Svetlana Khorkina (Russia)
- Khorkina 2 (vault) – round-off, back-handspring with 1/2 turn on, 1 1/2-twisting front tuck off, after Svetlana Khorkina (Russia)
- Kolman (horizontal bar) – a full-twisting Kovacs with two back somersaults and one full twist over the bar, after Alojz Kolman (Slovenia)
- Komova (uneven bars) – clear pike circle backward through handstand with flight and 1/2 turn (180°) to hang on high bar, after Viktoria Komova (Russia)
- Komova 2 (uneven bars) – clear pike circle backwards through handstand with flight to hang on high bar, after Viktoria Komova (Russia)
- Kononenko (uneven bars) – counter straddle hecht with 1/2 turn to hang on high bar in mixed L-grip, after Natalia Kononenko (Ukraine)
- Kotchetkova (balance beam) – full-twisting back-handspring, after Dina Kotchetkova (Russia)
- Korbut flip (balance beam) – standing back somersault to swing down on beam, after Olga Korbut (USSR)
- Korbut flip (uneven bars) – standing on the high bar, does back flip, then catches the bar, after Olga Korbut (USSR)
- Kovacs (horizontal bar) – double back somersault over bar, after Péter Kovács (Hungary)
- Liukin (floor exercise) – one of only 2 skills with D-score of H (0.8) (with the Shirai 3) on men's floor; triple back tucked salto, after Valeri Liukin (USSR)
- Liukin (horizontal bar) – Tkatchev with full-twisting layout, after Valeri Liukin (USSR)
- Liukin (balance beam) – salto front pike, take off from one leg to one foot landing to scale, hold for two seconds, after Nastia Liukin (US)
- Li Li German Giant (uneven bars) – after Li Li (China)
- Li Li (balance beam) – 1 1/4 turns on back (balance beam), after Li Li (China)
- Li Ya salto (uneven bars) – straddled Jaeger caught in a mixed grip, after Li Ya (China)
- Li Ya (uneven bars (dismount)) – backward giant into an Arabian double front pike, after Li Ya (China)
- Liu Xuan salto (uneven bars) – giant circle backward to handstand on one arm, after Liu Xuan (China)
- Loos (pommel horse) – reverse Stockli with hop backwards through handstand on another end, after Riley Loos (US)
- López (vault) – round-off, 1/2 twist on, front straight somersault with 1/2 turn off, after Denisse López (Mexico)
- Lynch (horizontal bar) – Tkatchev straddled with 1/2 t. to mix el-grip into back uprise to hdst, after Jair Lynch (US)
- Ma dismount (uneven bars) – a hecht-front-salto-full, after Ma Yanhong (China)
- Magyar traverse (pommel horse) – after Zoltán Magyar (Hungary)
- Magyar spindle (pommel horse) – after Zoltán Magyar (Hungary)
- Malone (parallel bars) – shoot up to handstand and fall back to support with 1/4 turn, after Brody Malone (US)
- Maloney (uneven bars) – a piked sole circle backward to handstand full turn after handstand phase to mixed-L or L-grip, after Kristin Maloney (US)
- Maloney (uneven bars) – begins from low bar inner front support and consists of piked sole circle backward through handstand with flight to high bar hang, after Kristin Maloney (US)
- Manna (floor exercise) – v-sit with legs horizontal (2 s.), after Bob Manna (US)
- McCool (balance beam) – beam mount approaches toward the end of the beam and is a flyspring forward with flight before and after the hand support on the beam and lands on both feet – approach at end of beam, after Courtney McCool (US)
- McNamara (uneven bars (mount)) – a jump to hang on high bar into free hip circle to handstand with 1/2 turn, after Julianne McNamara (US)
- Melissanidis (vault) – a round off entry onto vault table followed by a 2 1/2-twisting back tucked or piked somersault, after Ioannis Melissanidis (Greece)
- Memmel (floor exercise) – double turn with leg held in split position (double Y-turn), after Chellsie Memmel (US)
- Memmel (balance beam) – front flip with 1/2 turn (Barani) in piked position, after Chellsie Memmel (US)
- Mikulak (pommel horse) – double scissor forward sideways from one end to the other (3/3), after Sam Mikulak
- Miller (uneven bars) – cast to handstand with 1 1/2 turn after handstand to mixed-L grip, after Shannon Miller (US)
- Mitchell (floor exercise, balance beam) – triple turn (1080°) in tuck stand on one leg - free leg optional, after Lauren Mitchell (Australia)
- Miyachi (horizontal bar) – officially the only skill with highest D-score of I in men's gymnastics; a variant of the Bretschneider where the skill is done in a layout position; the straight Bretschneider, double-twisting Cassina or straight double-twisting Kovac, after Hidetaka Miyachi (Japan)
- Mo salto (uneven bars) – Gaylord 2, front tuck over high bar, starting and ending in a mixed grip, after Mo Huilan (China)
- Moors (uneven bars) – from underswing, with feet on bar, salto forward stretched with 1/2 turn, after Victoria Moors (Canada)
- Moors (floor exercise) – only skill with highest D-score of I in women's gymnastics, double-twisting double back layout, after Victoria Moors (Canada)
- Mostepanova (floor exercise) – front handspring with full twist before hand support, after Olga Mostepanova (USSR)
- Mukhina salto (floor exercise) – double salto backwards tucked or piked, with full 360 twist – after Elena Mukhina (USSR)
- Mukhina (uneven bars) – Korbut flip with full twist – after Elena Mukhina (USSR)
- Mustafina (uneven bars (dismount)) – 1 1/2-twisting double back tuck dismount, after Aliya Mustafina (Russia)
- Mustafina 2 (uneven bars) – full-twisting Maloney (or Seitz) caught in a mixed grip, after Aliya Mustafina (Russia)
- Mustafina (floor) – triple Y-turn, after Aliya Mustafina (Russia)
- Mustafina (vault) – round-off, 1/2 turn on, full twisting front off (laid out), after Aliya Mustafina (Russia)
- Nabieva (uneven bars) – toe-on reverse Hecht (Tkatchev) in the layout position, named after Tatiana Nabieva (Russia)
- Nguyen (parallel bars) – a free hip circle mount from the side of the bars with 3/4 turn to handstand position, after Marcel Nguyen (Germany)
- Nagornyy (floor) – Triple back pike, after Nikita Nagornyy (Russia)
- Okino (uneven bars (dismount)) – a free hip underswing with 1/2 twist to layout back salto, after Betty Okino (US)
- Okino (balance beam) – triple pirouette or triple turn, after Betty Okino (US)
- Omelianchik (balance beam) – back handspring with 3/4 turn dive to handstand, after Oksana Omelianchik (USSR)
- Omelianchik (vault) – round-off, 3/4 on, front pike off, after Oksana Omelianchik (USSR)
- O'Neill (still rings) – straight double felge bwd. to hang, after Paul O'Neill (US)
- Onodi (balance beam) – back handspring with 1/2 turn, after Henrietta Ónodi (Hungary)
- Pak salto (uneven bars) – does a backward flip on the high bar and then catches the low bar, after Pak Gyong-sil (North Korea)
- Patterson (balance beam (dismount)) – an Arabian double front dismount, after Carly Patterson (US)
- Pegan (horizontal bar) – double front salto with 1/2 turn – 180°, after Aljaž Pegan (Slovenia)
- Penev (floor exercise) – jump bwd. with 1/2 t. to dbl. salto fwd. str. w 1/2 t., after Eddie Penev (US)
- Phelps (vault) – 1/2 turn onto the vault (Tsukahara) to a layout backflip with 1/2 turn, after Jaycie Phelps (US)
- Phillps (balance beam) – a handstand straddle split, with a 90° backbend, originally performed on the balance beam and press to side handstand, front walkover to side stand on both legs, after Kristie Phillips (US)
- Preziosa (balance beam) – full turn with free leg held backwards with both hands, after Elisabetta Preziosa (Italy)
- Podkopayeva (vault) – round-off, 3/4 twist on, front piked somersault with 1/2 turn off, after Lilia Podkopayeva (Ukraine)
- Podkopayeva (floor) – double front somersault with a 1/2 twist, after Lilia Podkopayeva (Ukraine)
- Popa (floor exercise) – straddle pike jump with full turn (360°), after Celestina Popa (Romania)
- Produnova (vault) – one of only 2 skills with highest D-score of 6.4 in women's vault (other is the Biles or "half on—double full off"; first of only five women to have landed this in competition; front handspring on into double front somersault off, after Elena Produnova (Russia)
- Ray (uneven bars) – a Stalder backwards with release and counter movement forward to catch the high bar, after Elise Ray (US)
- Ray 2 (uneven bars) – a handstand on the high bar to a pike sole circle backward into a backward counter straddle-reverse hecht over the high bar and a rematch, after Elise Ray (US)
- Ray 3 (uneven bars (dismount)) – double-twisting double layout bars dismount, after Elise Ray (US)
- The Retton Flip (uneven bars) – a transition (front flip) from low to highbar, resulting in the gymnast perched or "sitting" on top of the high bar, after Mary Lou Retton (US)
- Ri Se Gwang (vault) – currently one of only five vaults with top official D-score of 6.0; full-twisting double Tsukahara, after Ri Se Gwang (North Korea)
- Ri Se Gwang 2 (vault) – currently one of only five vaults with highest official D-score of 6.0; front handspring double piked with 1/2 twist, or Drăgulescu piked in practice, after Ri Se Gwang (North Korea)
- Roethlisberger (parallel bars) – high wende and salto bwd tuck or pike, after John Roethlisberger (US)
- Roethlisberger 1 (horizontal bar) – dbl. salto fwd. t. or p. w. 1/1 or 3/2 t. over the bar, after John Roethlisberger (US)
- Roethlisberger 2 (horizontal bar) – double salto fwd. str. or with ½ t. or over the bar, after John Roethlisberger (US)
- Roth (pommel horse) – any Russian wendeswing with 360°t. and 3/3 travel., after Bill Roth (US)
- Semenova (floor exercise) – a double spin with the leg in back attitude, after Ksenia Semenova (Russia)
- Semenova (balance beam) – full spin with leg in back attitude, after Ksenia Semenova (Russia)
- Seitz (uneven bars) – on low bar, pike sole circle through handstand full twist in flight with phase to hang on high bar, after Elisabeth Seitz (Germany)
- Shaham (horizontal bar) – 1 1/2-twisting double back somersault over bar, after Noam Shaham (Israel)
- Shaposhnikova (uneven bars) – on the low bar, free hip circle with flight to hang on high bar, after Natalia Shaposhnikova (USSR)
- Shewfelt (vault) – aka Amanar for women, Yurchenko stretched with 2 1/2 twists, after Kyle Shewfelt (Canada)
- Shirai or Shirai-Nguyen (floor exercise) – quadruple-twisting layout backwards, after Kenzo Shirai (Japan) and Nguyen Tuan Dat (Vietnam)
- Shirai 2 (floor exercise) – triple-twisting layout forwards, after Kenzo Shirai (Japan)
- Shirai 3 (floor exercise) – triple-twisting double layout backwards; one of only two skills with highest official D-score of H (0.8) (other is the Liukin) currently in men's floor, after Kenzo Shirai (Japan)
- Shirai or Shirai-Kim (vault) – round-off, back-handspring into layout triple full, after Kenzo Shirai (Japan) and Kim Hee Hoon (South Korea)
- Shirai 2 (vault) – round-off, back-handspring (Yurchenko) with 3 1/2-twisting layout; one of only 5 vaults with highest official D-score of 6.0, after Kenzo Shirai (Japan, 1st time successfully completed in competition – 2016 Olympics in Rio de Janeiro)
- Shirai 3 (vault) – round-off, full-twisting back-handspring (aka Scherbo) on into double twist off, after Kenzo Shirai (Japan)
- Shushunova (floor exercise) – straddle jump to lay on front support, after Yelena Shushunova (Russia)
- Shushunova (uneven bars) – full-twisting Tkachev, after Yelena Shushunova (Russia)
- Silivaş (balance beam (mount)) – after Daniela Silivaş (Romania)
- Silivaş (floor) – double twisting double back tucked, after Daniela Silivaş (Romania)
- Sohn (pommel horse) – Kehr with 1/1 turn on 1 pommel, after Mark Sohn (US)
- Stalder (horizontal bar) – free circle backwards in straddle or legs together through handstand Josef Stalder (Switzerland)
- Steingruber (balance beam) - Gainer layout salto with full twist from end of beam, after Giulia Steingruber (Switzerland)
- Stroescu (floor exercise) – stretched forward salto with 2 1/2 twists, (mistakenly named) after Silvia Stroescu (Romania)
- Strong (uneven bars) – shoot over to low bar with 1 1/2 twists, after Lori Strong (Canada)
- Strong (Lori) hop (balance beam) – after Lori Strong (Canada)
- Strug (floor exercise) – a tour jete with additional 1/2 turn and landing on both feet, after Kerri Strug (US)
- Sugihara (balance beam) – double turn with the leg held in split position Aiko Sugihara (Japan)
- Talavera (balance beam) – pommel horse-like move with the circle done like a flair, after Tracee Talavera (US)
- Teza (balance beam) – Yurchenko loop is performed with a full-twisting handspring, after Elvire Teza (France)
- Thomas flair (pommel horse, floor exercise) – after Kurt Thomas (US)
- Thomas (pommel horse) – any circle or flair in side support, after Kurt Thomas (US)
- Thomas salto (floor exercise) – jump bwd. with 3/2 salto t. and 3/2 t., after Kurt Thomas (US)
- Tippelt (parallel bars) – Moy piked with straddle backward to handstand, after Sven Tippelt (East Germany)
- Tkachev (uneven bars) – reverse hecht; can be performed in straddled, piked, tucked or laid out, after Aleksandr Tkachyov (USSR)
- Tsukahara (vault) – involving a 1/4 or 1/2 turn onto the vault and back salto off, after Mitsuo Tsukahara (Japan)
- Tweddle (uneven bars) – sole circle backward to counter straddle hecht 1/2 turn to hang on high bar in mixed L-grip, after Beth Tweddle (Great Britain)
- Urzică (parallel bars) – salto forwards to full turn to upper arm hang rated, after Marius Urzică (Romania)
- van Leeuwen (uneven bars) – in the low bar, piked sole circle through handstand with flight to hang on high bar with 1/2 twist during flight phase, after Laura van Leeuwen (Netherlands)
- Wang Huiying (vault) – front handspring layout Barani, after Wang Huiying (China)
- Wells (parallel bars) – giant swing backwards with inlocation forward, after Trent Wells (US)
- Wevers turn (balance beam) – a double turn on beam with leg held horizontally, after Sanne Wevers (Netherlands)
- White (uneven bars) – a front Stalder into an L-grip to handstand with 1/2 turn in handstand, after Morgan White (US)
- Whitfield (still rings) – dislocate and cross cables (1/1 t), after Jason Whitfield (US)
- Whittenburg (still rings) – triple salto backward piked, after Donnell Whittenburg (US)
- Wong (balance beam) – salto forward tucked with 1/2 turn mount, after Hiu Ying Angel Wong (China – Hong Kong)
- Wynn (still rings) – slow roll fwd. with straight body through cross to inverted cross (2 s.), after Brandon Wynn (US)
- Yang Hak Seon (vault) – currently one of only five vaults with top official D-score of 6.0; front handspring triple twist, after Yang Hak-Seon (South Korea)
- Yang Hak Seon 2 (vault) – currently one of only five vaults with highest official D-score of 6.0; Tsukahara with 3 1/2 twists or Kasamatsu with 2 1/2 twists, after Yang Hak-Seon (South Korea)
- Yang Bo (balance beam) – from cross stand, jump to over split with body arched and head dropped backward, after Yang Bo (China)
- Yurchenko (vault) – round-off, back-handspring onto the vaulting table, after Natalia Yurchenko (USSR)
- Yurchenko loop (balance beam) – on side position, back-handspring to backward hip circle, after Natalia Yurchenko (USSR)
- Zamolodchikova (vault) – Tsukahara stretched with double turn (720°) off, after Elena Zamolodchikova (Russia)
- Zamolodchikova (balance beam) – flic-flac or back-handspring with full twist to hip circle backwards, after Elena Zamolodchikova (Russia)
- Yarotska (uneven bars) – Stalder hecht from low bar to high bar, after Irina Yarotska (Ukraine)
- Zanetti (still rings) – from hanging scale rearways press to planche, after Arthur Zanetti (Brazil)
- Zonderland (parallel bars) – 1 1/4 Diamadov to one bar immediate 3/4 Healy to both bars, after Epke Zonderland (Netherlands)

== Association football ==
- Bosman ruling – after Jean-Marc Bosman (Belgium)
- Cruyff turn – after Johan Cruyff (Netherlands)
- Cuauteminha – after Cuauhtémoc Blanco (Mexico)
- Jomo Cosmos F.C. – after Jomo Sono (South Africa)
- Makelele role – after Claude Makelele
- Panenka penalty kick – after Antonín Panenka (Czech Republic)

== Athletics ==
- Fosbury flop – a high jump style, named after Dick Fosbury (US)
- Volzing – a now illegal pole vault technique, named after David Volz (US)

== Baseball ==
- Maddux (statistic) – named after Greg Maddux (US)
- Mendoza Line – named after Mario Mendoza (US)
- Ohtani rule – A change to pitcher substitutions regarding the Designated Hitter position, named after Shohei Ohtani (Japan)
- Pat Venditte rule – A change to the baseball rule book clarifying how a switch pitcher declares which arm they will throw with, named after Pat Venditte (US)
- Pesky's pole – named after Johnny Pesky (US)
- Steve Blass disease – a term applied to talented players who seem to inexplicably lose their ability to accurately throw a baseball, named after Steve Blass (US)
- Tal's Hill – named after Tal Smith (US)
- Tommy John surgery – named after Tommy John (US)

== Basketball ==
- Bird rights – named after Larry Bird, this is a rule in the NBA collective bargaining agreement related to a team's salary cap and ability to sign its own veteran players.
- Elam Ending – a method for ending games once a specified target score is reached, named after its creator, Nick Elam.
- Hack-a-Shaq – the strategy of committing intentional fouls (originally a clock management strategy) for the purpose of lowering opponents' scoring, named after Shaquille O'Neal.

== Brazilian jiu-jitsu ==
- Brabo choke – arm triangle choke, named after Leonardo Vieira's email address
- D'Arce choke – arm triangle choke, named after Joe D'Arce
- Ezequiel choke – chokehold which compresses the opponent's trachea or carotid arteries, named after Ezequiel Paraguassu
- Kimura lock – armlock, named after Masahiko Kimura
- Saint Preux choke – choke, also known as the Von Flue choke, named after Ovince Saint Preux
- Von Flue choke – choke, also known as the Saint Preux choke, named after Jason Von Flue

== Boxing ==
- Ali shuffle – named after Muhammad Ali (US)
- Marquess of Queensberry Rules – named after John Douglas, 9th Marquess of Queensberry (Great Britain)

== Cricket ==
- Bosie (alternative name for a googly) – after Bernard Bosanquet (England)
- Kolpak – a Slovak team handball player whose victory in the European Court of Justice opened the door to numerous non-English players in English county cricket, term also used in both codes of rugby, after Maroš Kolpak (Slovakia)
- Mankading – after Vinoo Mankad (India)
- Marillier shot – after Dougie Marillier (Zimbabwe)
- Dilscoop – after Tillekaratne Dilshan (Sri Lanka), A cricket batting stroke, also known as a "ramp shot", developed by Sri Lankan right-handed batsman Tillakaratne Dilshan during the ICC World Twenty20 held during June 2009 in England.
- Duckworth–Lewis–Stern method – is generally accepted to be the most accurate method of setting a target score in a limited overs cricket match interrupted by weather or other circumstances. Originally the Duckworth–Lewis method, after Frank Duckworth (England) and Tony Lewis (Wales); after the two retired, Steven Stern (Australia) became the custodian of the calculation, and his name was added to the title in 2014.
- Nat-meg - after Natalie Sciver. It is an inventive shot against yorkers.

== Croquet ==
- Duffer tice – a tice positioned, usually a yard or so North, and a touch East, of Hoop 6, laid on the second turn of the game, named after the Irish croquet player Duff Mathews (Ireland)
- Peel – to send a ball other than the striker's ball through its target hoop, named after Walter Peel (England)
- Solomon grip – the grip used by and named after John Solomon (England)

== Disc Golf ==
- Hyzer – Disc angle when the disc edge away from a player's hand is closer to the ground than the edge in a player's hand. Named after H.R. Hyzer.

== Figure skating ==
- Axel jump – after Axel Paulsen (Norway)
- Besti squat – after Natalia Bestemianova (Russia)
- Biellmann spin – after Denise Biellmann (Switzerland)
- Charlotte spiral – after Charlotte Oelschlagel (Germany)
- Ina Bauer – after Ina Bauer (Germany)
- Kerrigan spiral – after Nancy Kerrigan (US)
- Lutz jump – after Alois Lutz (Austria)
- Salchow jump, – after Ulrich Salchow (Sweden)
- Loop jump – in some countries (Germany and Poland, for example) this jump is called a Rittberger, after Werner Rittberger (Germany)
- 'Tano Lutz – after Brian Boitano (US)
- Walley jump – after Nate Walley (US)
- Kayla Catch – after Kayla Doig (Australia)
- Rippon Lutz – after Adam Rippon (US)

== Golf ==
- Stimpmeter - a device to measure the speed of putting greens, named after Edward S. Stimpson Sr.

== Ice hockey ==
- The Datsyuk – after a particular move by Pavel Datsyuk (Russia), where a player fakes a shot by holding the puck further back, and waits for the goaltender to be out of position before shooting.
- The Forsberg - after a particular move by Peter Forsberg where a player (after deking,) holds their stick with one hand and taps the puck in on the far side of the net.
- Gordie Howe hat trick –after Gordie Howe (Canada), where a player is credited with a Goal, Assist, and Fight in the same game.
- Lemieux cycle – after Mario Lemieux (Canada), where a player gets five goals in five ways in the same game. (Even-Strength, Powerplay, Penalty kill, Penalty shot, Empty Net.)
- Rob Ray Rule – after Rob Ray (Canada) where players must keep their jersey tied down to their pants. Ray would take off his jersey and shoulder pads in order to be more difficult to grab during a fight.
- Savard spin-o-rama (or Savardian spin-o-rama) – originally named after Serge Savard (Canada), but made famous by Denis Savard (Canada), Where a player with the puck skating towards a defending player begins to turn one way, then quickly performs a 360° spin to trick the defender and continues forward.
- The Brodeur Rule– due to his ability to play the puck outside of his crease, named after Martin Brodeur. (Canada) A trapezoid behind the goal line where a goaltender is allowed to play the puck. Stopping goalies from playing pucks in the corners.
- The Sean Avery Rule – after Sean Avery (Canada), the rule makes it illegal for a player to stand in front of a goalie and wave his or her stick in the netminder's face in an unsportsman like way.
- The Gretzky Rule - after Wayne Gretzky (Canada), this rule implemented between 1985 and 1992 introduced offsetting penalties to prevent players like Gretzky from using the extra space on 4-on-4 plays to score more often.
- Gretzky's office - the area behind the net, from where Wayne Gretzky would often set up goals.

== Lacrosse ==
- Air Gait - a maneuver in which a player scores by jumping from behind the goal crease, dunking the ball over the top goal crossbar, and landing on the opposite side of the crease, after Gary Gait (Canada)

== Long Distance Running ==
- Young Shuffle - Named after Cliff Young, the "Young Shuffle" has been adopted by some ultramarathon runners because it expends less energy. Cliff Young (athlete) (Australia)

== Motorsport ==
- Gurney flap and Gurney Bubble – named after Dan Gurney (United States)

== Pickleball ==
- Erne – A volley hit near the net by a player positioned outside the court or in the process of leaping outside the court. Named for Erne Perry, the first person known to have used the shot in mainstream competitive play.
- Joey – A return shot, after an opposing player hits an around-the-post (ATP) shot, that involves hitting the ball directly back at the player that made the initial ATP shot. Named for Joe Valenti
- Nasty Nelson – A serve that intentionally hits the non-receiving opposing player closest to the net, rewarding the point to the server. Named for Timothy Nelson.
- Zane Navratil serve – A serve that involves swiping the ball against the paddle, when tossing the ball in preparation for striking the ball, in order to impart spin on the ball. Also called the chainsaw serve.

== Rhythmic gymnastics ==
- The Shugurova – tipping / spinning a rolling hoop with the feet during a leap, after Galina Shugurova (Soviet Union, Russia)
- The Timochenko – after Alexandra Timoshenko (Soviet Union, Ukraine)
- The Ralenkova – Rotation on the back, legs close, without support of the hand, after Anelia Ralenkova (Bulgaria)
- The Zaripova – Split leap with ring or with back bend of the trunk, take-off and landing on the same leg, after Amina Zaripova (Russia)
- The Kabaeva I – Ring leap with both legs, after Alina Kabaeva (Russia)
- The Kabaeva II – Backscale Pivots; Front split trunk bent back below horizontal from standing position or from the position on the floor, after Alina Kabaeva (Russia)
- The Kabaeva III – Balance with support on the chest, after Alina Kabaeva (Russia)
- The Kabaeva IV – Split with hand support; also with jump preparation, after Alina Kabaeva (Russia)
- The Cid Tostado – starting on one knee, leg forward, ball held with the foot. large roll of the ball on both legs, after Almudena Cid Tostado (Spain)
- The Tchachina I – Switch leap with changing legs, after Irina Tchachina (Russia)
- The Tchachina II – Reverse illusion turns, after Irina Tchachina (Russia)
- The Tchachina III – Split balance from standing to kneeling position without hand support on the free leg or trunk side at horizontal, after Irina Tchachina (Russia)
- The Utyasheva – backsplit to backscale to backsplit pivot with help, after Lyasan Utiasheva (Russia)
- The Gizikova I – Front split balance with support passing the free leg into back split balance with support, after Zarina Gizikova (Russia)
- The Gizikova II – Front split rotation with support with a passage of the free leg into back split with support or vice versa, after Zarina Gizikova (Russia)
- The Kanaeva I – Ring Pivots (ring pivot spiral also known as "Kanaeva Pivot", quadruple/triple ring turn, quadruple queen pivot) – after Evgenia Kanaeva (Russia)
- The Kanaeva II – Switch Turn, after Evgenia Kanaeva (Russia)
- The Kanaeva III – Rotation on the stomach, legs in split, without support of the hand, after Evgenia Kanaeva (Russia)
- The Zhukova – Cossack leap, straight leg to the side high up, whole foot higher than head with support and turn, after Inna Zhukova (Belarus)
- The Kondakova – Pivot turn revolutions (pivot turn with forward free leg to half free leg position), after Daria Kondakova (Russia)
- The Dmitrieva – Pivot connecting turns (attitude turns + ring pivot turn with help) – after Daria Dmitrieva (Russia)
- The Raffaeli – Side split pivot without help, trunk side at horizontal on relevé with free leg bent – after Sofia Raffaeli (Italy)
- The Staniouta – cossack turn starting on floor + connecting penché turn, after Melitina Staniouta (Belarus)
- The Kudry I – back bend to roll over apparatus catch, after Yana Kudryavtseva (Russia)
- The Kudry II – Spinning ball on the tip of the finger while doing front walkover, after Yana Kudryavtseva (Russia)
- The Kudry III – Chaine turn wrapped in ribbon serpentine with one arm on the back, after Yana Kudryavtseva (Russia)
- The Kudry IV – Dive jump with asymmetric movements of the clubs: during the jump, a high bounce of the club from the floor and passing to the roll to catch this club. Large circle with the other club, after Yana Kudryavtseva (Russia)
- The Kudry V – Spinning ball on the tip of the thumb while doing a side split balance without support, after Yana Kudryavtseva (Russia)
- The Kramarenko – Backscale Pivots; free leg bent 30 degrees from standing position or from the position on the floor, after Lala Kramarenko (Russia)
- The Ashram – back-bend turn on floor with help, after Linoy Ashram (Israel)
- The Trubnikova – side split without support, trunk side at horizontal, passing to front split, trunk bent back below horizontal, after Daria Trubnikova (Russia)
- The Agiurgiuculese (Ag Jump) – turning split leap with ring of the back leg, take off and landing on the same leg (jete en tournant), after Alexandra Agiurgiuculese (Italy)
- The Bessonova – Stag Leap, take off from one or two feet with turn of the body with ring, also with back bent of the trunk, after Anna Bessonova (Ukraine)
- The Elkatib – Front split with or without help. Also trunk back at the horizontal position, after Alia Yassin Elkatib (Egypt)
- The Garayeva – From back split on flat foot, trunk bend forward passing to Backscale Pivots, after Aliya Garayeva (Azerbaijan)
- The Sakura Penché – body bent at the horizontal or below, rotation on flat foot with ring, after Sakura Hayakawa (Japan)
- Mamun's ball roll – From a sitting position, transit into a dynamic balance (arm stand), with ball rolling from trunk to feet and catch, after Margarita Mamun (Russia)

== Rugby league ==
- Sonny-Billed – to have a hard driving tackle performed on someone, named after Sonny Bill Williams (New Zealand) who consistently performed these tackles
- Hopoate – named after John Hopoate (Tonga)

== Skiing ==
- Gundersen method – in Nordic combined, the point time differential set up between the ski jumping and cross-country skiing portions of the event, after skier Gunder Gundersen (Norway)

== Speed climbing ==
- The Tomoa Skip – moving directly from the third hold to the fifth hold, skipping the fourth. This technique is named after Tomoa Narasaki, who invented the movement.

== Speed Skating ==
- To do a Bradbury – to win a contest or race as the one standing, after Australian short track speed skater Steven Bradbury (Australia) won his 1000m gold medal at the 2002 Winter Olympics when all other contestants crashed out on the final lap. Can apply to multiple sports or situations.

== Tennis ==
- Henman Hill (officially Aorangi Terrace; many other nicknames) – after Tim Henman (Great Britain)

== Trampoline Gymnastics ==
- The Miller – triple-twisting double straight back, after Wayne Miller (US)

== Ultimate (Frisbee) ==
- Callahan – after Henry Callahan (US)

== U.S. college sports ==
- Russell Rule – a variation of the Rooney Rule adopted in 2020 by the West Coast Conference, with the WCC version named for Bill Russell.

== Weightlifting ==
- The van Dam Lift – after Rob Van Dam (US)

== Wrestling ==
- Karelin lift – after Alexander Karelin (USSR, Russia)
- John Smith single – after John Smith (American wrestler) (US)
- Gable grip – after Dan Gable (US)

== See also ==
- Gymnastics elements named after Simone Biles
