= Hero thrill show =

The Hero thrill show fundraising event helps ensure that the children of Philadelphia Police Officers and Firefighters that are killed or severely disabled in the line of duty can receive financial assistance in order to complete their education.

First Thrill Show held in Philadelphia on July 23, 1941 at Municipal Stadium.

== History ==
Created in 1954 because of an explosion that took the lives of ten firefighters, the Police and Firefighter Thrill Show has assisted over 800 students graduate from various colleges and universities. With the help of these scholarships, there are currently 50 students attending colleges throughout the United States.

The main source of funding is through the sale of tickets and proceeds coming from the annual Hero Thrill Show, which is held in the Wachovia Spectrum Complex. Throughout the year, the Hero Thrill Show, which is typically held the second weekend in September has included major contributions from local celebrities, sport figures, and police and firefighters.

On January 20, 2006 the President of the Hero Scholarship Fund announced that "After carefully comparing revenues over the past several years, including decreases as well as the expense and difficulty in putting on the show, it has been decided to discontinue the show...." * In April, 2006, James J. Binns, a Philadelphia Lawyer, founded the Hero Thrill Show Inc., which assumed production of the Hero Thrill Show and the administration of funds generated by the Hero Thrill Show. The Board of Directors is chaired by Mr. Binns and is composed of the Police Commissioner, Fire Commissioner, President of the Fraternal Order of Police, Lodge Number 5, President of the International Association of Firefighters, Local 22 and a number of Philadelphia Business Leaders.

The first show which featured a 15-hour rodeo, raised $78,000 with western movie stars Gene Autry, Roy Rogers, Dale Evans, and Tex Ritter attending. For decades the Thrill Show was performed at JFK Stadium (originally Municipal Stadium). When this Philadelphia landmark was torn down, the show moved first to the Civic Center, and then to the Convention Center. It has returned to its old home and is now performed on the grounds of the stadium complex on Broad Street in South Philadelphia. The past few years has shown a dramatic growth with the event blooming into a vast family affair with tens of thousand of fans enjoying a carnival, car show, concert, and fire works show. In 2006, the event raised $360,000 in scholarship money.

2011, is the 6th anniversary of the Hero Thrill Show under the leadership of the Hero Thrill Show, Inc. The performers and exhibitors are all active Police Officers and Firefighters who continue the tradition that was started in 1954 by risking their lives performing daredevil demonstrations utilizing equipment that is standard issue in the departments.

== Recent attendance ==
In 2006, under the leadership of the Hero Thrill Show, Inc., attendance jumped to over 13,000 spectators. Attendance has steadily increased over the past 5 years. 2010 was another banner year with crowds in excess of 50,000 in attendance. Funds generated are being used to defray the cost of college education for the children of police and firefighters that have been killed while on duty.

=== 2012 Thrill Show ===
The 2012 Grand Marshal was A. Thomas Schomberg, the world-renowned sculptor of the "ROCKY" statue that is situated at the steps of the Philadelphia Museum of Art. Philadelphia's own Bob Pantano, who hosts the first and longest running radio dance party in the nation on 98.1 WOGL, entertained the crowd with music for the five-hour fundraiser.

The families of police officers Brian Lorenzo, Bradley Fox and Moses Walker and firefighters Daniel Sweeney and Robert Neary will benefit from the 2012 fundraiser.

=== 2011 Thrill Show ===
The 2011 Grand Marshal was Gerald Tommaso DeLouise better known by his stage name Burt Young. An American actor, painter and author, he is best known for his Academy Award-nominated role as Sylvester Stallone's brother-in-law and best friend Paulie in the Rocky film series. Philadelphia's own Bob Pantano, who hosts the first and longest running radio dance party in the nation on 98.1, entertained the crowd with music for the five-hour fundraiser.

The 2011 Hero thrill show brought back the Highway Patrol Motorcycle Drill Team, the elite K-9 Unit, the Strike Force Bicycle Stunt Team and the Philadelphia Police & Fire Pipes and Drums. Philly’s famous sports team mascots The Phillie Phanatic, Swoop and Hip Hop as well as the Sixers Dancers and Eagles Cheerleaders made special appearances. Guests were to be able to participate or watch the action-packed Sonny Hill basketball shootout competition as well.
