= Fernanda Festa =

Brazilian rhythmic gymnast

- Full name: Fernanda Festa Rezende
- Born: 1981 (age 44–45) Campinas, Brazil

Gymnastics career
- Discipline: Rhythmic gymnastics
- Country represented: Brazil (1992-1997)
- Retired: yes
Medal record
Rhythmic gymnastics
Representing Brazil
Pan American Games
Bronze medal – third place	1995 Mar del Plata	Group all-Around

Fernanda Festa Rezende (born 1981) is a retired Brazilian rhythmic gymnast and coach.

== Career ==
In 1992, gymnasts Festa competed in her first São Paulo state championships at only eleven years old. In 1994 she competed in Curitiba for a spot on the Brazilian national team to participate in the Pan American Championships in Monterrey, Mexico, being part of the group that finished in 6th place.

In 1995 she was called up to integrate the national senior group set to compete in the upcoming Pan American Games in Mar del Plata, Argentina. To do so she had to move to Londrina, where she would live with the other gymnasts who were preparing for the competition. At the games she won bronze in the All-Around with Camila Ferezin, Dayane Camilo, Luciana Barrichello and Luciane de Oliveira. She was then invited, along Kizzy Antualpa and Flavia Costa, by the Cuban gymnastics federation to compete in the Inter-Club Championships, this being the third time the gymnasts had received an invitation from Cuba, but until then they had not participated due to lack of sponsorship. This time the three athletes were able to participate thanks to the efforts made by their parents. In addition to competing, they did a one-week internship with the Cuban coaches, as Cuba had the best rhythmic gymnastics school in the Americas at the time. There she was 6th overall and won bronze with clubs and with rope.

The following year she was again selected to enter the national senior group preparing for the 1996 World Championships in Budapest, being 21st in the All-Around.

In 1997 she participated in the Four Continents Cup in Sydney with the group, winning the bronze medal. After this competition she made the decision to retire.

She then decided to study Physical Education at PUC-Campinas and graduated in 2002. Since 1999 she worked as a coach at the Clube da Hípica and also at the Clube Regatas. In 2016 she coached the pre junior group that won all three gold medals at the South American Championships in Paipa.
