= Amy Chow =

American artistic gymnast

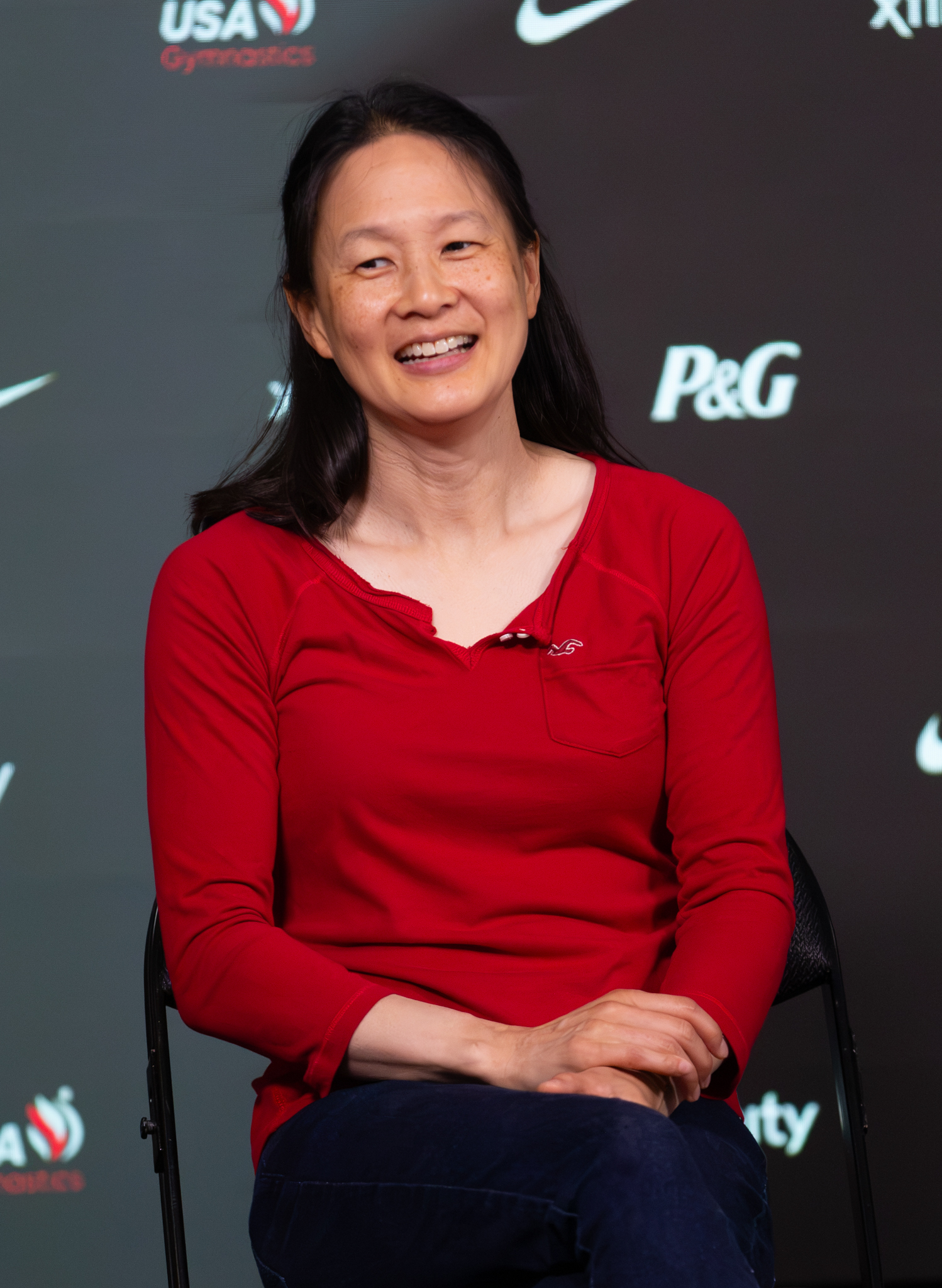
- Chow in 2026

Personal information
- Born: May 15, 1978 (age 48) San Jose, California

Gymnastics career
- Discipline: Women's artistic gymnastics
- Country represented: United States; (1990–1997, 1999–2001 (USA))
- Club: West Valley Gymnastics School
- Head coaches: Mark Young, Diane Amos
- Eponymous skills: Chow/Khorkina, Chow II
Medal record
Women's artistic gymnastics
Representing the United States
Olympic Games
Gold medal – first place	1996 Atlanta	Team
Silver medal – second place	1996 Atlanta	Uneven bars
Bronze medal – third place	2000 Sydney	Team
World Championships
Silver medal – second place	1994 Dortmund	Team
Pan American Games
Gold medal – first place	1995 Mar del Plata	Team
Gold medal – first place	1995 Mar del Plata	Vault
Silver medal – second place	1995 Mar del Plata	Uneven Bars
Bronze medal – third place	1995 Mar del Plata	All-Around

Amy Yuen Yee Chow (Chinese: 周 婉 儀; pinyin: Zhōu Wǎnyí; Jyutping: Zau1 Jyun2 Ji4; born May 15, 1978) is an American former artistic gymnast who competed at the 1996 and 2000 Summer Olympics. She is best known for being a member of the Magnificent Seven, which won the United States' first team gold medal in Olympic gymnastics. She is also the first Asian-American woman to win an Olympic medal in gymnastics.

== Early life ==
Chow was born to Nelson and Susan Chow, who had immigrated to the United States from Guangzhou and Hong Kong, respectively.

Chow began gymnastics training in 1981 at the age of 3. Her mother wanted her to be a ballerina and tried enrolling her in ballet schools, none of which would take a child that young. She then signed Amy up for classes at West Valley Gymnastics School in Campbell, California, where she joined an accelerated program at the age of 5, training under Mark Young and Diane Amos. Her younger brother, Kevin, was also a gymnast.

== Gymnastics career ==
=== 1989–1993 ===
At 11 years old, Chow became the first gymnast at her school to reach the elite level. She began competing nationally in 1990.

=== 1994–1995 ===
Chow's first international competition was the 1994 World Championships in Dortmund, Germany. After a poor showing in preliminaries (she fell twice on vault and three times in a single balance beam routine), she performed well in the team finals, helping the United States clinch a silver medal.

The following year, Chow was part of the gold medal-winning American team at the 1995 Pan American Games, where she also won a gold medal on vault, silver on the uneven bars and bronze in the all-around. She made the United States team for the 1995 World Championships, but had to withdraw because of a sprained ankle sustained just days before the competition.

=== 1996 ===
Chow is primarily known for her performance at the 1996 Summer Olympics, where she won a gold medal with the team and a silver on the uneven bars. At the Olympic Trials, she fell off the beam, scraping her face on the side of the apparatus, but got up and completed her routine despite obvious pain, and was named to the Olympic team along with Amanda Borden, Dominique Dawes, Shannon Miller, Dominique Moceanu, Jaycie Phelps and Kerri Strug. The team would become known as the Magnificent Seven.

In the team final at the Olympics, Chow competed on the uneven bars and vault. In the bars event final, she completed a very difficult routine with an almost flawless dismount and scored a 9.837. She edged out the more experienced Dawes to tie for silver with Bi Wenjing of China, although the commentators felt Chow should not have had to share the medal, as Bi made a visible mistake that the judges did not take into account.

After the Olympics, Chow and her teammates performed in numerous exhibitions, including the John Hancock Tour.

=== 2000 ===
When Chow decided to return to gymnastics in hopes of competing at the 2000 Olympics, she contacted Mark Young and asked him to train her for it. He agreed, despite the fact that he was retired by then. Chow juggled a rigorous training regimen with medical research at Stanford University, where she was working toward her undergraduate degree in biology, but ultimately took time off school to train.

Five of the seven members of the Magnificent Seven tried for a spot on the 2000 Olympic team: Chow, Dawes, Miller, Moceanu and Phelps. In the end, only Chow and Dawes made it, along with Jamie Dantzscher, Kristen Maloney, Elise Ray and Tasha Schwikert. Chow proved she was in top form by finishing second in the all-around at the Olympic Trials. She was also named by Béla Károlyi as one of three leaders of the 2000 team, the other two being Ray and Maloney. The team finished fourth at the Olympics, and individually, Chow finished fourteenth in the all-around final.

Ten years later, on April 28, 2010, Chow and her teammates were awarded the bronze medal when it was discovered that the original bronze medalists, the Chinese team, had falsified the age of team member Dong Fangxiao. Dong's results were nullified, and the Chinese team was stripped of the medal by the International Olympic Committee. Chow said that while the American team had been disappointed with its fourth-place finish in 2000, she nevertheless felt bad for the Chinese gymnasts because they had worked equally hard to medal.

=== Notable skills ===
Chow has two gymnastics skills named after her on the uneven bars: the "Chow/Khorkina" (stalder 1½ pirouette) and the "Chow II" (stalder to Shaposhnikova). She was nicknamed "the Trickster" within the gymnastics community for her extreme difficulty on each apparatus and her ability to perform complicated skills with apparent ease. She was the first American woman to perform a double-twisting Yurchenko vault and a tucked double-double bars dismount in international competition. She also competed one of the most difficult balance beam routines ever performed. It included a standing piked full; back handspring, layout, back handspring, layout series; full-twisting swing down; and round-off, back handspring, triple full dismount.

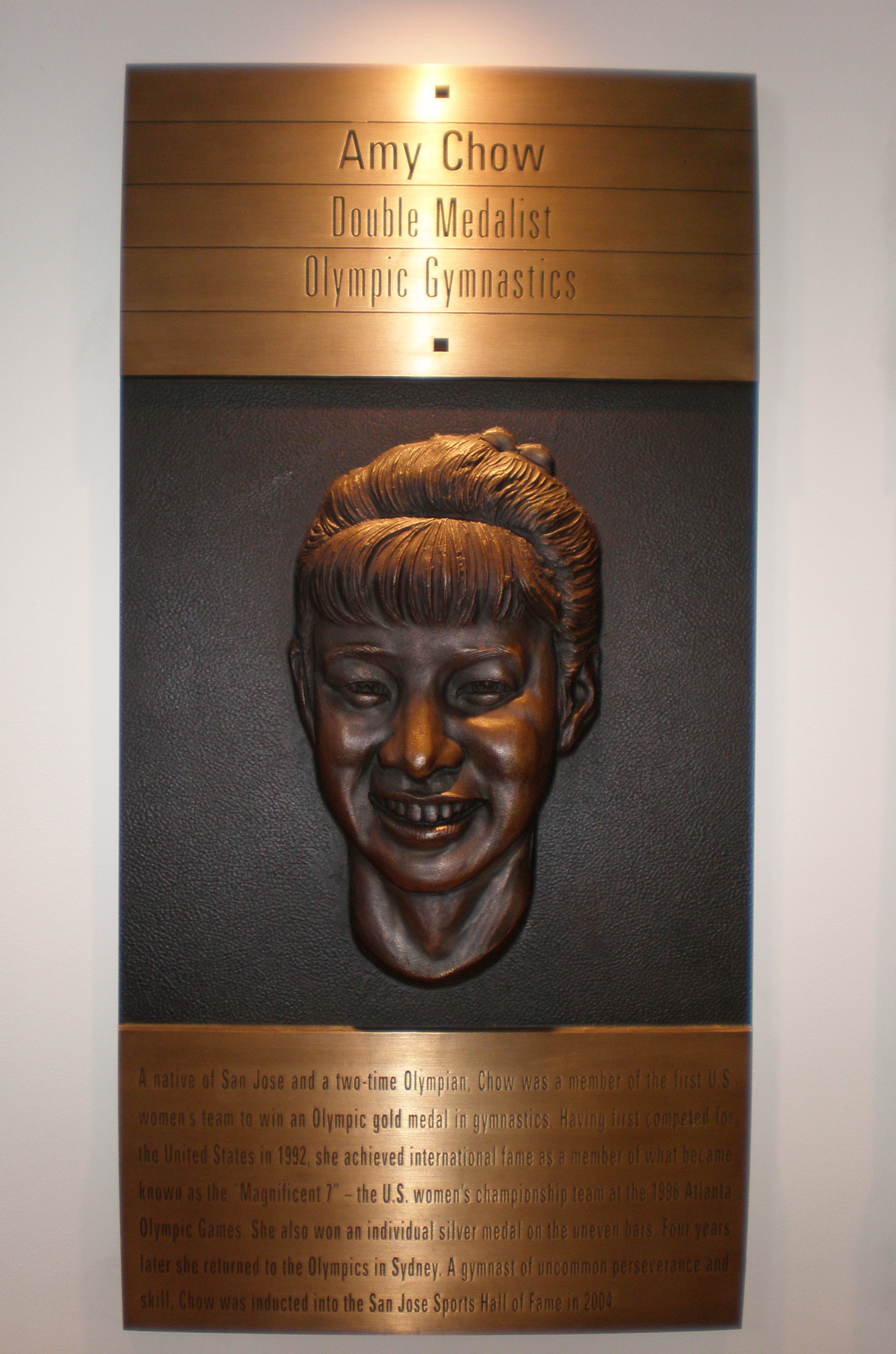
Chow's plaque at the San Jose Sports Hall of Fame

== Other accomplishments ==
In 1994, Chow received an advanced level certificate of merit for piano. In high school, she was a competitive diver for Castilleja School, and continued with the sport at Stanford. She also competed in pole vaulting as an unattached athlete at "open" track and field events. Because she received monetary compensation following the 1996 Olympics, she was ineligible to be a collegiate athlete.

== Post-Olympics ==
Chow attended Stanford University and graduated with a Bachelor of Science in biology in 2002. She graduated from Stanford Medical School in 2007 and completed her residency in pediatrics at Lucile Packard Children's Hospital. She is licensed as a physician and surgeon.

She married Jason Ho, an orthopedic surgeon, on July 10, 2010, in Saratoga, California. After finishing her residency at Lucile Packard in June 2010, she set up private practice as a general pediatrician in Northern California, where she lives with her husband and two sons, Timmy and Matty.

== Awards and recognition ==
Chow was inducted into the U.S. Gymnastics Hall of Fame twice: in 1998 as a member of the 1996 Olympic team, and again in 2005 as an individual. In 2004, she was inducted into the San Jose Sports Hall of Fame.

In spring 2003, Chow received the Paul & Daisy Soros Fellowship for New Americans. She was also a recipient of the Outstanding Overseas Chinese Award.

In 2008, she was inducted into the United States Olympic Hall of Fame in the team category, alongside the rest of the Magnificent Seven. The team received their award in Chicago with other Olympic greats.
