= William Roth (disambiguation) =

William Roth (1921–2003) was an American lawyer and politician from Delaware.

William Roth or Bill Roth may also refer to:

- William M. Roth (1916–2014), American businessman and politician from California
- Bill Roth (gymnast) (born 1970), American gymnast
- Bill Roth (sportscaster) (20th–21st century), American television and radio sportscaster
