= Jennifer Exaltacion =

Canadian gymnast

Personal information
- Born: 6 August 1979 (age 45); Windsor, Ontario, Canada

Sport
- Sport: Gymnastics

Jennifer Exaltacion (born 6 August 1979) is a Canadian gymnast. She competed in five events at the 1996 Summer Olympics.
