= Ana Destéfano =

Argentine gymnast (born 1981)

Personal information
- Nationality: Argentine
- Born: 23 May 1981 (age 44)

Sport
- Sport: Gymnastics

Ana Destéfano (born 23 May 1981) is an Argentine former gymnast. She competed at the 1996 Summer Olympics.
