= Stephen McCain =

American gymnast (born 1974)

- Full name: Stephen Wayne McCain
- Born: January 9, 1974 (age 52) Houston, Texas, U.S.
- Height: 172 cm (5 ft 8 in)

Gymnastics career
- Discipline: Men's artistic gymnastics
- Country represented: United States; (1993–2005)
- College team: UCLA Bruins
- Gym: USOTC; Team Gattaca; Team Texaco
Medal record
Men's artistic gymnastics
Representing United States
Event	1st	2nd	3rd
World Championships	0	1	0
Pan American Games	1	1	0
Total	1	2	0
World Championships
Silver medal – second place	2001 Ghent	Team
Pan American Games
Gold medal – first place	1995 Mar del Plata	Team
Silver medal – second place	1999 Winnipeg	Team

Stephen Wayne McCain (born January 9, 1974) is a retired American gymnast. He was a member of the United States men's national artistic gymnastics team and competed at the 2000 Olympics and the 2001 World Artistic Gymnastics Championships. McCain attended the University of California, Los Angeles.

== Olympics ==
After finishing 12th at the 1996 Olympic Trials and failing to make the team, McCain moved to the United States Olympic Training Center in Colorado Springs, Colorado to focus more on his career.

== Other international competition ==
McCain participated in four World Championships. In 2001, his team won a silver medal.

McCain retired from gymnastics after not making the US Olympic Team in 2004.
