= Bill Roth (gymnast) =

American artistic gymnast

- Full name: William Roth
- Born: August 21, 1970 (age 56) Yonkers, New York, U.S.
- Height: 5 ft 7 in (170 cm)

Gymnastics career
- Discipline: Men's artistic gymnastics
- Country represented: United States (1990–1996)
- College team: Temple Owls
- Head coach: Fred Turoff
- Former coach: John Roth
- Eponymous skills: Roth (pommel horse)
- Retired: 1996
Medal record
Men's artistic gymnastics
Representing United States
Event	1st	2nd	3rd
Pan American Games	1	2	0
Total	1	2	0
Pan American Games
Gold medal – first place	1995 Mar del Plata	Team
Silver medal – second place	1995 Mar del Plata	Floor
Silver medal – second place	1995 Mar del Plata	Horizontal bar

William Roth (born August 21, 1970) is a retired American artistic gymnast. He was a member of the United States men's national artistic gymnastics team and won a gold and two silver medals at the 1995 Pan American Games.

== Early life and education ==
Roth was born on August 21, 1970, in Yonkers, New York, and was raised in Mohegan Lake, New York. His father, John, coached him in gymnastics. He attended Lakeland High School where he was a member of the boys gymnastics team coached by his father. A standout as a youth athlete, Roth considered pursuing higher education and gymnastics at Ohio State, Iowa, and Western Michigan before enrolling at Temple University to be trained by coach Fred Turoff.

== Gymnastics career ==
Roth competed collegiately for the Temple Owls men's gymnastics team. He was an All-American in multiple disciplines and led Temple to three Eastern Intercollegiate Gymnastics League championships before graduating in 1992.

While at Temple, Roth competed at the USA Gymnastics National Championships. He was the United States national vault champion at the 1989 U.S. National Gymnastics Championships. He placed second in vault at the 1990 and after the event Roth was named to his first United States men's national artistic gymnastics team. In the following years, injuries took their toll on Roth, who underwent reconstructive knee surgery and pectoral tendon surgery causing him to miss the 1992 United States Olympic trials.

On the international stage, Roth was a member of the 1994 World Artistic Gymnastics Team Championships delegation for the United States in Dortmund. He later represented the United States at the 1995 Pan American Games and won a team gold medal and two individual silver medals.

After his performance at the 1996 United States Olympic trials resulted in not being selected for the team, Roth retired.

== Post-competition career ==
Upon retiring from gymnastic competition, Roth worked for the Atlanta Hawks doing acrobatics before he joined the Philadelphia 76ers as their mascot Hip Hop. He played the character for 14 years until a new ownership group selected a different mascot. He later became a co-owner and head coach at Delco Gymnastics Training Center in Woodlyn, Pennsylvania.

Roth and his wife, Christina, opened their 20,000 square-foot gym, Crosspoint Gymnastics, in September 2015 where he is involved with coaching youth gymnastics.

== Awards and honors ==
Roth was inducted into the Temple Owls Hall of Fame in 2006.

== Eponymous skills ==
Roth has one element named for him on the pommel horse.

Gymnastics elements named after Bill Roth
Apparatus	Name	Description	Difficulty (Note: Valid for the 2025–2028 Code of Points)	Added to Code of Points
Pommel horse	Roth	"Russian wendeswing with 360° t. and 3/3 travel."	D, 0.4	Originally introduced in 1993, renamed in 2006.
