= John Roethlisberger =

American gymnast (born 1970)

- Roethlisberger in 2026

Personal information
- Full name: John Roethlisberger
- Born: June 21, 1970 (age 56) Fort Atkinson, Wisconsin, U.S.
- Height: 171 cm (5 ft 7 in)
- Relatives: Fred Roethlisberger (father); Marie Roethlisberger (sister)

Gymnastics career
- Discipline: Men's artistic gymnastics
- Country represented: United States; (1989–2000)
- College team: Minnesota Golden Gophers
- Gym: Team Texaco; Twin City Gymnastics
- Eponymous skills: Roethlisberger (parallel bars); Roethlisberger 1 (horizontal bar); Roethlisberger 2 (horizontal bar)
Medal record
Men's artistic gymnastics
Representing United States
Event	1st	2nd	3rd
Pan American Games	2	2	0
Pacific Alliance Championships	0	1	1
Total	2	3	1
Pan American Games
Gold medal – first place	1995 Mar del Plata	Team
Gold medal – first place	1995 Mar del Plata	Horizontal bar
Silver medal – second place	1995 Mar del Plata	All-around
Silver medal – second place	1995 Mar del Plata	Rings
Pacific Alliance Championships
Silver medal – second place	2000 Christchurch	Team
Bronze medal – third place	1998 Winnipeg	Team

John Roethlisberger (born June 21, 1970) is an American retired gymnast. He was a member of the United States men's national artistic gymnastics team and represented the U.S. at the 1992 Olympics in Barcelona, 1996 Olympics in Atlanta, and 2000 Olympics in Sydney. He is also a four-time U.S. National all-around champion and a four-time U.S. National pommel horse champion. He also won back-to-back American Cup titles in 1995 and 1996. John was named Sportsperson of the Year in 1990, 1992, 1993, 1995, 1998, and 2000 and was a member of six World Championship teams throughout his career.

== Collegiate career ==
Roethlisberger enrolled at the University of Minnesota, where his father was head coach of the men's gymnastics team. While there, he won the NCAA all-around title three times and the Big Ten Conference all-around title four times. In 1993, Roethlisberger won the Nissen Award and was a 1992 and 1993 Academic All-American. In 1993, John was named the winner of the NCAA Top-Six Award, awarded annually to the top six student-athletes in the nation from all sports.

== Commentary career ==
John has been in the commentary box for many Visa Championships, U.S. Classic, and Nastia Liukin Cup competitions for NBC. He also does commentary for the Big Ten and SEC Networks college gymnastics meets.

== Personal life ==
John is the son of Fred Roethlisberger, a member of the 1968 U.S. Olympic gymnastics team. His sister Marie Roethlisberger was an alternate on the 1984 U.S. Olympic gymnastics team. He earned his BS degree in finance and international business. He now co-owns camp Flipfest, along with John Macready. Flipfest is located on Lake Frances in Crossville, Tennessee.

== Eponymous skills ==
Roethlisberger has three named elements - one on the parallel bars and two on the horizontal bar.

Gymnastics elements named after John Roethlisberger
Apparatus	Name	Description	Difficulty (Note: Valid for the 2025–2028 Code of Points)	Added to Code of Points
Parallel bars	Roethlisberger	"High wende and salto bwd tuck or pike."	D, 0.4	Named in 1997 but first performed in 1989.
Horizontal bar	Roethlisberger 1	"Dbl. salto fwd. t. or p. w. 1/1 or 3/2 t. over the bar."	D, 0.4	
Horizontal bar	Roethlisberger 2	"Double salto fwd. str. or with ½ t. or over the bar."	D, 0.4	
