= Leyanet González =

Cuban artistic gymnast

Leyanet Gonzalez
- Full name: Leyanet González Calero
- Born: 30 September 1978 (age 48) Sancti Spiritus, Cuba

Gymnastics career
- Discipline: Women's artistic gymnastics
- Country represented: Cuba
Medal record
Representing Cuba
Summer Universiade
Silver medal – second place	1997 Sicily	Balance Beam
Bronze medal – third place	1997 Sicily	Floor
Pan American Games
Gold medal – first place	1991 Havana	Balance Beam
Gold medal – first place	2003 Santo Domingo	Vault
Silver medal – second place	1991 Havana	Team
Silver medal – second place	1995 Buenos Aires	Team
Bronze medal – third place	1995 Buenos Aires	Balance Beam
Bronze medal – third place	1995 Buenos Aires	Floor
Pan American Championships
Silver medal – second place	1997 Medellín	All-Around
Bronze medal – third place	1997 Medellín	Team
Bronze medal – third place	1997 Medellín	Vault
Bronze medal – third place	1997 Medellín	Balance Beam
Bronze medal – third place	2001 Cancún	Team

Leyanet González Calero (Note: In this Spanish name, the first or paternal surname is González and the second or maternal family name is Calero.) (born 30 September 1978) is a Cuban former artistic gymnast who competed in the 2004 Summer Olympics. She is one of only five female gymnasts to return to international competition after having a child, along with Larisa Latynina, Oksana Chusovitina, Suzanne Harmes, and Aliya Mustafina.

At the 2004 Olympics, at the age of 25, González finished 22nd in the all-around.

González is now retired from gymnastics and lives in Cancún, Mexico.

== Eponymous skill ==
González has one eponymous skill listed in the Code of Points.

Apparatus	Name	Description	Difficulty (Note: Valid for the 2025-2028 Code of Points)
Uneven bars	González	Round-off in front of low bar flic-flac through handstand phase on low bar	D
