= John Macready (gymnast) =

American artistic gymnast

- Full name: John McWilliams Macready
- Born: April 29, 1975 (age 51) Los Angeles, California, U.S.

Gymnastics career
- Discipline: Men's artistic gymnastics
- Country represented: United States (1995–2000)
- Gym: USOTC; Team Texaco
- Head coach: Vitaly Marinich

John McWilliams Macready (born April 29, 1975) is an American gymnast and motivational speaker. He was a member of the United States men's national artistic gymnastics team.

== Career ==
Macready was a member of the 1996 US Olympic Team and two-time World Championship Team member in 1995 and 1997. He was the youngest member of the 1996 men's US Olympic gymnastics team.

== Personal life ==
Macready is the son of actor Michael Macready and grandson of actor George Macready. Olympic teammate John Roethlisberger and Macready own and operate FLIPFEST, a gymnastics camp located on Lake Frances in Crossville, Tennessee. He has worked with the Make a Wish Foundation and hosts the annual "John Macready March of Dimes Invitational."
