= Shanyn MacEachern =

Canadian gymnast

Personal information
- Born: 17 February 1980 (age 45); Brampton, Ontario, Canada

Sport
- Sport: Gymnastics

Shanyn MacEachern (born 17 February 1980) is a Canadian gymnast. She competed at the 1996 Summer Olympics.
