= Marie Roethlisberger =

American physician and gymnast (born 1966)

- Born: May 12, 1966 (age 60)

Gymnastics career
- Discipline: Women's artistic gymnastics

Marie Roethlisberger (born May 12, 1966), is a former gymnast who was a 1984 United States Olympic gymnastics alternate. She is almost completely deaf. She is the daughter of United States 1968 Olympic Gymnast Fred Roethlisberger and the sister of 1992, 1996, and 2000 Olympic gymnast John Roethlisberger. She was selected as a 1991 NCAA Top VI Award (now Top VIII) winner as one of the six top NCAA student-athletes and the 1991 female Walter Byers Scholarship winner as the National Collegiate Athletic Association's top scholar-athlete.

== Career ==
Roethlisberger competed nationally and internationally from 1982 until 1986. In national and international competition she placed as high as third in five consecutive appearances at the all-around at the United States National Gymnastics Championships, as fifth place in the team competition at the 1986 Goodwill Games, and sixth place in the team competition (seventeenth in all-around) at the 1985 World Gymnastic Championships. She then matriculated at the University of Minnesota. In 1984, Roethlisberger placed seventh at the U.S. Olympic trials making her the alternate on the six-woman team despite being 100% deaf in one ear and approximately 85% deaf in the other. Her floor routines were choreographed to music with heavy bass so that she could feel the reverberations. Her hearing loss was attributable to a childhood bout of meningitis. In 1988, Roethlisberger was awarded the Honda Inspiration Award which is given to a collegiate athlete "who has overcome hardship and was able to return to play at the collegiate level". She overcame hearing issues to become a highly decorated gymnast.

She was the 1990 NCAA gymnastics champion on uneven bars; four-time All-American; seven-time Big Ten Conference champion. She was also an Academic All-American. She was the 1982 and 1986 AAU uneven bars champion. She was part of the 1991 Top VI class with Suzy Favor, Ed McCaffrey, Meredith Rainey, Pat Tyrance and fellow gymnast Patrick Kirksey.

After obtaining her BS degree in 1991, she went on to obtain her MD in 1996 both from the University of Minnesota. As of 2008, she is a physician in Madison, Wisconsin. She completed her medical residency in family medicine in Appleton, Wisconsin.
