= Mihai Bagiu =

American gymnast (born 1971)

- Bagiu in 2026

Personal information
- Full name: Mihai Florin Bagiu
- Born: April 10, 1971 (age 55) Timișoara, Socialist Republic of Romania
- Height: 5 ft 10 in (178 cm)

Gymnastics career
- Discipline: Men's artistic gymnastics
- Country represented: United States; (1993–1997)
- Gym: Gold Cup Gymnastics School; SCATS Gymnastics
- Head coach: Ed Burch
- Assistant coach: Ron Howard
- Retired: c. 1996
Medal record
Men's artistic gymnastics
Representing United States
Event	1st	2nd	3rd
Pan American Games	1	1	0
Total	1	1	0
Pan American Games
Gold medal – first place	1995 Mar del Plata	Team
Silver medal – second place	1995 Mar del Plata	Pommel horse

Mihai Florin Bagiu (born April 10, 1971) is an American gymnast. He was a member of the United States men's national artistic gymnastics team and competed in six events at the 1996 Summer Olympics.

== Early life and education ==
Bagiu was born on April 10, 1971, in Timișoara, Socialist Republic of Romania. Bagiu and family moved to Los Angeles in 1979 when he was eight years old. He became a United States citizen in 1989 at 18 years old.

Bagiu began competing in gymnastics in Romania at 5 years old. In Huntington Beach, California, he trained at SCATS Gymnastics and attended Marina High School. He left for Albuquerque, New Mexico, in September 1992 to train at Gold Cup Gymnastics School under Ed Burch, who previously coached Lance Ringnald and Trent Dimas, and his previous club coach from Southern California, Ron Howard. Like others who trained at Gold Cup, Bagiu did not attend college to focus on his gymnastics training.
