= Chainey Umphrey =

American gymnast (born 1970)

- Umphrey in 2026

Personal information
- Full name: Albert Chainey Umphrey
- Born: August 2, 1970 (age 56) Albuquerque, New Mexico, U.S.

Gymnastics career
- Discipline: Men's artistic gymnastics
- Country represented: United States; (1989–1997)
- College team: UCLA Bruins
- Head coach: Arthur Shurlock
Medal record
Men's artistic gymnastics
Representing United States
Event	1st	2nd	3rd
Pan American Games	1	0	0
Goodwill Games	0	0	1
Pacific Alliance Championships	0	1	0
Total	1	1	1
Pan American Games
Gold medal – first place	1995 Mar del Plata	Team
Goodwill Games
Bronze medal – third place	1994 Saint Petersburg	Team
Pacific Alliance Championships
Silver medal – second place	1992 Seoul	Rings

Albert Chainey Umphrey (born August 2, 1970) is a retired American gymnast. He was a member of the United States men's national artistic gymnastics team and competed in the 1996 Summer Olympics, helping the U.S. team to a 5th-place finish in the team all-around.

== Early life ==
Umphrey was born in Albuquerque, New Mexico on August 2, 1970, and took up gymnastics at age 7. He attended Albuquerque Academy and graduated in 1988. While in Albuquerque, he trained at Gold Cup Gymnastics along with future Olympians Lance Ringnald and Trent Dimas.

== Career ==
Umphrey competed in college gymnastics at UCLA, where he was an All-American and two-time team captain. He was a member of the U.S. national team from 1989 to 1997, competing at the World Artistic Gymnastics Championships in 1991, 1994, and 1996. His best result was a 4th-place finish on the horizontal bar in 1994. He also won a gold medal for the team all-around at the 1995 Pan American Games.

At the 1992 Olympic trials, Umphrey finished 8th, just 0.018 points short of making the seven-person team. He was able to rebound and finished 4th at the 1996 trials to gain a place on the U.S. Olympic team. At the 1996 Summer Olympics, he was held out of his best event, the horizontal bar, as well as the vault, a coaching decision that he called "devastating". Nevertheless, he was able to help the U.S. to a 5th-place finish in the team all-around, their best result since winning gold at the Soviet-boycotted 1984 Olympics.

== Personal life ==
Away from competition, Umphrey also worked to promote the sport of gymnastics and appeared at clinics around the United States. He was a guest on the children's program Mister Rogers' Neighborhood in 1986 and again in 1995, demonstrating gymnastics skills and training methods.

Umphrey retired from gymnastics in 2000 and returned to UCLA for medical school. He now practices in Physical medicine and rehabilitation in San Jose, California.
