= Hip-Hop (mascot) =

Former mascot of the Philadelphia 76ers

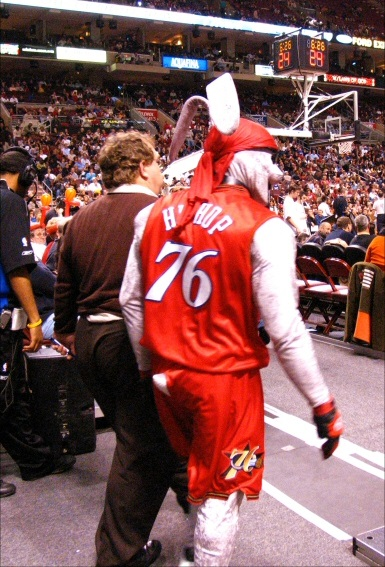
Hip-Hop during a Sixers game in February 2005

Hip-Hop was the mascot of the National Basketball Association (NBA)'s Philadelphia 76ers. He served the primary mascot role from January 15, 1998 to November 22, 2011, and the secondary mascot for the 2025-26 season. A rabbit character, Hip-Hop usually entertained Sixers fans during halftime and time-outs by performing acrobatic slam dunks from a trampoline, often over an item or person, such as a motorcycle, a dancer, a fan, or a ladder. Hip-Hop also appeared at various Sixers publicity events and fundraisers.

Hip-Hop was portrayed by Bill Roth, a former United States men's national artistic gymnastics team member who won a gold and two silver medals at the 1995 Pan American Games. Reprising the role in 2025-26, Roth was honored by the Sixers with a halftime tribute and framed Hip-Hop jersey during the team's first throwback night of the season.

It was revealed Hip-Hop would not be returning under new Sixers ownership, occurring after the NBA 2011 lockout. Hip-Hop was eventually replaced with Franklin, the Sixers' current mascot, from February 2015 onward.

It was reported and confirmed that Hip-Hop would be returning for select games and events throughout the 2025-26 season as part of the 2000-01 team's 25th anniversary celebration, appearing alongside Franklin, who is characterized as being a close friend of Hip-Hop. Hip-Hop later made his first appearance of the season on November 8th

.
