= Kristy Powell =

American artistic gymnast

Kristen "Kristy" Powell
- Born: February 13, 1980 (age 46) Stuart, Florida, U.S.
- Height: "5 ft 3 in"

Gymnastics career
- Country represented: United States
- Former coaches: Tom Forster; Lori Forster; Bela Karolyi; Mary Lee Tracy
- Retired: May 26, 1998

Kristen "Kristy" Powell (born February 13, 1980) is an American gymnast. She was co-national All-Around champion alongside Vanessa Atler in 1997. She retired from competition the following year.

== Early life ==
Powell was born in Stuart, Florida. Powell was raised by her mother along with four older brothers. She began practicing gymnastics at age 5. Her brother Rusty taught her how to do flips, which she picked up quickly. The family relocated to Houston, Texas when gymnastics coach Bela Karolyi invited nine-year old Powell to train under his tutelage. That same year, Powell portrayed young Nadia Comaneci in a TV Movie about the Olympic Gymnasts' life. When Powell switched gyms two years later, the family again relocated to Colorado Springs, Colorado.

== Competitive gymnast ==
Powell made her competitive debut in 1991 at the junior national championships where she placed 9th. Powell's first international competition was in 1993, when she competed in a dual meet against Japan where she earned three silver medals. In 1995, Powell was named the U.S. team for the McDonald's American Cup following the injury of a team member. Powell won the all-around title, vault, and uneven bars at the competition. That same year Powell was part of the U.S. team that won gold at the Pan American Games.

Powell's success in 1995 was followed by injuries, including lateral collateral ligament in her knee and extreme pain in her shins. Powell competed in 1996, hoping to make the Olympic Team. She finished 7th U.S. championships and 13th in the Olympic trials but was not chosen for the team. Powell then suffered more physical injuries including a pulled back muscle and another knee injury.

In January 1997 Powell relocated to the Cincinnati Gymnastics Academy where Mary Lee Tracy became her new coach. Powell moved to Cincinnati while her family stayed behind in Colorado Springs. Powell took a four-week break from her training for surgery on her calf muscle. Powell became co-United States national all-around champion with Vanessa Atler in 1997. At the same event, Powell also won gold on the uneven bars. The win allowed Powell to be named to the U.S. team for the World Championship, qualified her for support funding from the national team, and earned her a spot touring with the Magnificent Seven, the U.S. gymnasts who won the 1996 Olympic team competition. At 1997 World Championships, Powell was part of the U.S. team, placing last in the team competition. At the same event, she placed 23rd in the individual all-around.

Powell retired from competitive gymnastics in 1998. Years of injuries made competition too physically painful.

== Cirque du Soleil ==
Powell joined Cirque du Soleil as an aerialist in 2003. Powell performed in La Nouba as the first American trapeze artist in the show.
