= Diego Lizardi =

Puerto Rican artistic gymnast

- Full name: Diego Lizardi Marcial
- Born: October 9, 1975 San Juan, Puerto Rico
- Died: February 21, 2008 (aged 32) Caguas, Puerto Rico
- Height: 1.65 m (5 ft 5 in)

Gymnastics career
- Discipline: Men's artistic gymnastics
- Country represented: Puerto Rico
Medal record
Men's artistic gymnastics
Representing Puerto Rico
Pan American Games
Bronze medal – third place	1999 Winnipeg	Rings

Diego Lizardi Marcial (October 10, 1975 – February 21, 2008) was a Puerto Rican athlete specialized in gymnastics. During his career, Lizardi represented Puerto Rico in several international tournaments including two Summer Olympic Games.

On February 21, 2008, Lizardi died in a car accident when his car struck a parked truck on the back. The circumstances of the accident are still being investigated.

== Biography ==
Diego Lizardi Marcial was born in Hato Rey, Puerto Rico. In 1981, while 6 years old, he started studying at the Gymnastic School in Cupey. Later, he studied at the Interamerican University of Puerto Rico in Hato Rey.

He started rising as a gifted gymnast winning several national championships in "All Around" competitions. From 1988 to 2001, he gathered 13 championships in various levels.

In 1990, Lizardi participated in his first international competition at the 1990 Central American and Caribbean Games held in Mexico. The Puerto Rican team rose in this tournament with the bronze medal. In 1993, he rose with the silver medal at the same tournament, this time held at Ponce, Puerto Rico. He also has won 9 world championships during this period.

In 1996, he participated at the 1996 Summer Olympics in Atlanta, finishing at the 64th spot. He participated again at the 2000 Summer Olympics in Sydney, Australia.

In 2003, he was selected as Puerto Rico's flag bearer for the 2003 Pan American Games held at Santo Domingo, Dominican Republic.

After retiring as a competitive athlete, Lizardi continued collaborating with the Puerto Rico Gymnastics Federation while he created private gymnastics training centers throughout Puerto Rico.

Lizardi died February 21, 2008, in a late night car accident when his car struck a parked truck. At the time, he was working to open another gymnastics school for kids in Puerto Rico's third largest city, Ponce.

Hundreds of Puerto Ricans attended funeral services at the Puerto Rico Olympic Headquarters in Old San Juan where, in the presence of Lizardi's widow and parents, acting Governor Fernando Bonilla declared him to be Puerto Rico's "Eternal Standard-Bearer" ("El Eterno Abanderado") and then Puerto Rico Senate President Kenneth McClintock made a commitment to appropriate the funds necessary to hold the International Gymnastics Competition that Lizardi proposed to hold in 2009 in San Juan in his last conversation with McClintock's wife, San Juan Sports and Recreation Director María Elena Batista. Then Sports and Recreation Secretary David Bernier seconded the senator's proposal. Lizardi's body was later cremated.

In June, 2008, at the request of Senate of Puerto Rico President Kenneth McClintock, Senate Budget Committee Chairwoman Migdalia Padilla and former Senate President Antonio Fas Alzamora, the Puerto Rico Legislature appropriated $25,000 for a statue of Diego Lizardi to be placed at the Puerto Rico Sports Museum in Guaynabo, Puerto Rico.

== Awards ==
=== Central American and Caribbean Games ===
- Mexico 1990 - Bronze with team
- Ponce 1993 - Silver in Floor exercise
- Maracaibo 1998 - Gold in Still rings

=== Pan American Games ===
- Cuba 1991 - Fourth place with team
- Winnipeg 1999 - Bronze in Still rings

=== Iberoamerican Championship ===
- Brazil - Gold medal

=== International Cup ===
- San Juan 1997 - First place in Still rings, Floor, and "All Around"
