= Annia Hatch =

Cuban-American artistic gymnast

- Full name: Annia Portuondo Hatch
- Born: June 14, 1978 (age 48) Guantánamo, Cuba

Gymnastics career
- Discipline: Women's artistic gymnastics
- Country represented: United States (2002–2004)
- Former countries represented: Cuba (1988–1996)
- Club: Stars Elite
- Head coach: Alan Hatch
- Former coach: Rene Sanson Rivera
- Retired: August 22, 2004
Medal record
Women's artistic gymnastics
Representing United States
Olympic Games
Silver medal – second place	2004 Athens	Team
Silver medal – second place	2004 Athens	Vault
Representing Cuba
World Championships
Bronze medal – third place	1996 Puerto Rico	Vault
Pan American Games
Silver medal – second place	Mar del Plata 1995	Team
Silver medal – second place	Mar del Plata 1995	Balance beam
Bronze medal – third place	Mar del Plata 1995	Vault
Bronze medal – third place	Mar del Plata 1995	Uneven bars

Annia Portuondo Hatch (born June 14, 1978, in Guantánamo, Cuba) is a Cuban-American artistic gymnast who competed for the United States at the 2004 Summer Olympics.

== Career in Cuba ==
Hatch began gymnastics in her native Cuba at the age of four. She won her first Cuban National Championships when she was ten; over the course of her career, she would win the title seven times.

Competing for Cuba, Hatch made her debut at the World Gymnastics Championships in 1993 and placed tenth in the all-around. In 1995, she won three medals at the Pan American Games, placing second on the balance beam and third on the vault and uneven bars, as well as fourth in the all-around. The following year, she became the first Cuban gymnast to win a medal at the World Championships, with a bronze on the vault.

Hatch qualified to the 1996 Olympics as an individual competitor, but a lack of funding prevented the Cuban Olympic Committee from sending her. She retired in 1997; married an American, Alan Hatch; and moved to the United States. With her husband, she became a part-owner and coach of the Stars Academy gym in West Haven, Connecticut. In 2001, she became an American citizen.

== Career in the United States ==
Hatch resumed training at the elite level in 2001, with her husband as her coach. In mid-2002, she won the U.S. Classic, a qualifier to the National Championships, defeating reigning national champion Tasha Schwikert. She went on to place fourth at Nationals, performing two strong vaults (a double-twisting Tsukahara and a double-twisting Yurchenko) and establishing herself as a contender for a medal at the 2002 World Championships: Muriel Grossfeld, a former national champion who worked with Hatch, called her "probably the best vaulter in the world".

Although Hatch was a U.S. citizen, Olympic rules stated that during the first year after obtaining citizenship in a new nation, an athlete needed permission from her former country of citizenship to represent the new one in international competition. Fidel Castro refused to give Hatch permission to compete for the U.S., prompting American government officials and former President Jimmy Carter to petition Cuba, unsuccessfully, on her behalf. Because Cuba would not release her, Hatch had to wait until 2003 to represent the United States internationally.

Hatch won the vault title at the 2003 National Championships and was named to the 2003 World Championships team, but tore her anterior cruciate ligament (ACL) the day before the start of the competition. It can take up to six months after ACL reconstruction for an athlete to be able to resume training. However, Hatch was able to return to competition by the middle of 2004, in time for the National Championships and Olympic Trials, and she was named to the U.S. team for the 2004 Olympics in Athens.

In the team competition at the Olympics, Hatch performed on vault and contributed to the United States' silver medal. Although her ACL was not completely rehabilitated, she still qualified to the vault event final, where she won a silver medal behind Monica Roșu of Romania. She was the first American woman to win an Olympic vault medal since Mary Lou Retton in 1984.

== Post-Olympics ==
After the Olympics, Hatch turned to coaching, while also working in fashion (including developing her own clothing line). In January 2012, she moved to Ashburn, VA where she resides now. Her Annia Cares project organization was launched in 2016 to help and support athletes and families around the world.

== See also ==
- Nationality changes in gymnastics
