= Amanda Borden =

American artistic gymnast (born 1977)

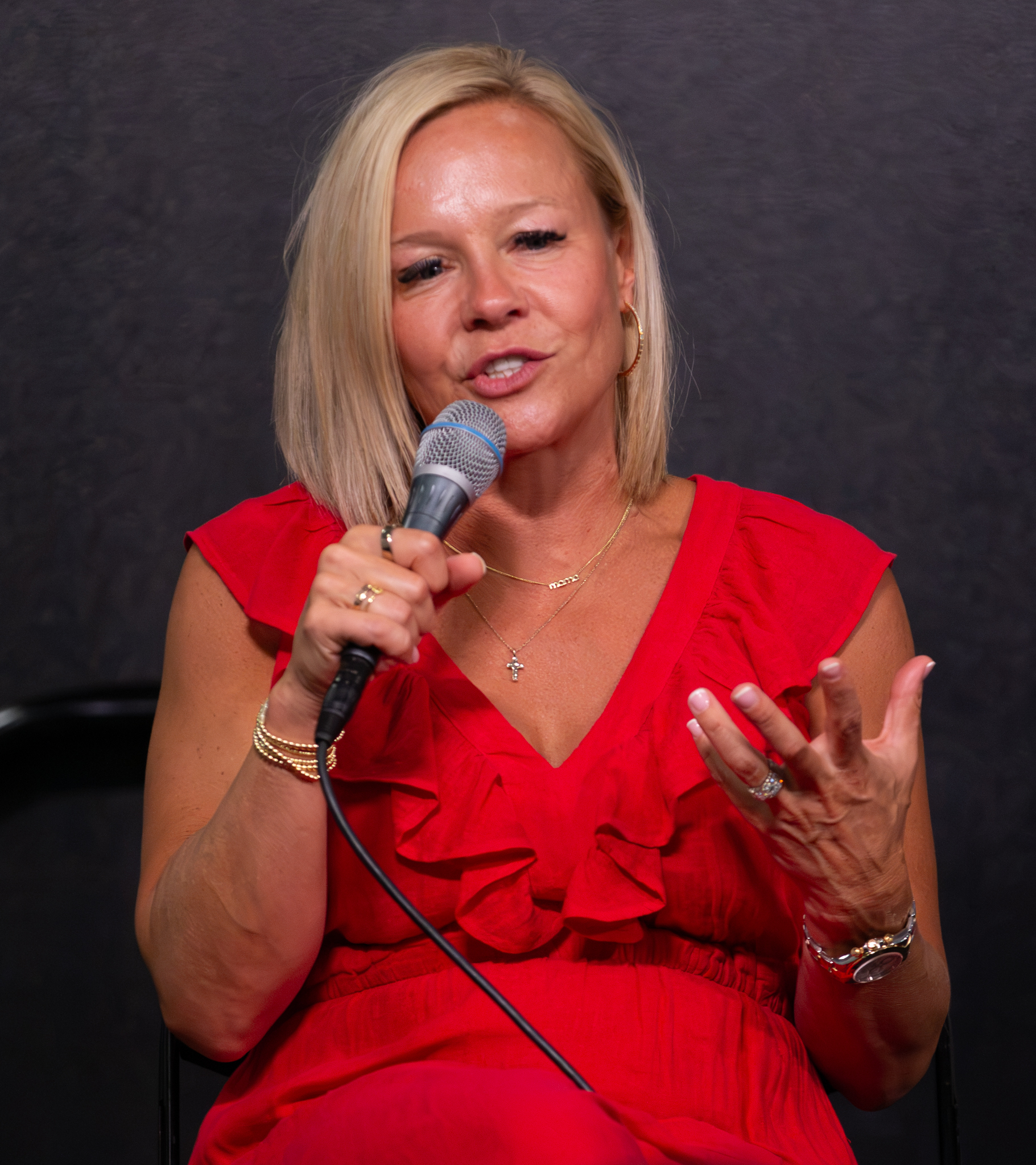
- Borden in 2026

Personal information
- Full name: Amanda Kathleen Borden
- Born: May 10, 1977 (age 49) Cincinnati, Ohio, U.S.

Gymnastics career
- Discipline: Women's artistic gymnastics
- Country represented: United States (6 (1990, 1992-97))
- Club: Cincinnati Gymnastics Academy
- Head coach: Mary Lee Tracy
Medal record
Olympic Games
Gold medal – first place	1996 Atlanta	Team
World Championships
Silver medal – second place	1994 Dortmund	Team
Pan American Games
Gold medal – first place	1995 Mar del Plata	Team
Gold medal – first place	1995 Mar del Plata	Balance Beam
Silver medal – second place	1995 Mar del Plata	All-around
Silver medal – second place	1995 Mar del Plata	Floor Exercise

Amanda Kathleen Borden (born May 10, 1977) is an American retired gymnast. She was the captain of the gold medal-winning United States team in the 1996 Summer Olympics, the Magnificent Seven; a team medalist at the World Championships, and a multiple medalist at the 1995 Pan American Games. Borden was known for her clean form and technique.

== Early life ==
Amanda Kathleen Borden was born in Cincinnati, Ohio. She attended Finneytown Secondary Campus where she was on the A-honor roll, the National Honor Society and the Spanish National Honor Society. Borden was also her high school's homecoming queen.

== Gymnastics ==
Borden began gymnastics in 1984, and trained under coach Mary Lee Tracy at Cincinnati Gymnastics Academy. She was a member of the U.S. National Team for six years, earning her first berth as a junior in 1990. Due to her clean form and strong technique, Borden was chosen to demonstrate the 1993–1996 compulsory routines to the entire gymnastics community at the 1991 World Championships. Her enthusiastic, energetic demeanor also attracted attention, prompting commentators to nickname her "Pepsodent." However, injuries were a part of the adversities she had to work through. In the spring of 1991, she broke the growth plate on her left elbow. She trained with a cast to compete in the U.S. Gymnastics Championships, but then Borden had to withdraw the day before the competition because of a pulled right hamstring.

At age 15, the 1992 Olympic Games was her best chance to compete at the Olympics. Borden placed 5th at the 1992 U.S. National Championships, and 4th on floor and beam. At the 1992 Olympic Trials, however, she had a difficult competition, and placed 7th. She was not named to the Olympic team. Greatly disappointed, Borden briefly considered retiring, but within three days she was back at the gym training. The following year, at the U.S. National Championships, she placed 4th in the all-around, and was named as an alternate for the 1993 World Championships.

In 1994, Borden placed third in the all-around, uneven bars, and floor exercise at Nationals, and was named to both World Championships teams (in 1994, for the first and only time, there were separate team and individual Worlds). At the Team World Championships in Dortmund Germany, Borden helped the U.S. team win the silver medal. At the individual Worlds in Brisbane, Australia, she placed 8th in the all-around and made the final in uneven bars. Borden's original skill on the balance beam, a twisting straddle jump, was added to the Code of Points and named after her as element #2.302.

At the Pan Am Games in 1995, Borden competed on the U.S. team, which won the gold medal in the team competition. Individually, she won a second gold medal on balance beam, and silver medals in both the floor exercise and the all-around. Later in the year at the 1995 U.S. National Championships, she had to withdraw due to an injury.

1996 offered Borden a second chance at the Olympic Games. At the 1996 U.S. Nationals, Borden placed 4th in the all-around. At the Olympic Trials, she placed fifth, and was named to the U.S. team for the 1996 Olympics in Atlanta. Her teammates unanimously chose Borden as their Olympic team captain. At the Games, she competed on floor exercise and beam, and all four of her scores (compulsories and optionals) were counted toward the team total. Borden and her teammates went on to become the first American women's gymnastics team ever to win a gold medal at the Olympic Games, and the first American team overall to win the gold at a non-boycotted Games.

== After gymnastics ==
After her victory as part of the "Magnificent Seven", Borden appeared in numerous national tours and television appearances. She graduated summa cum laude from Arizona State University, earning a degree in early childhood education. Under NCAA rules Borden was barred from competing in gymnastics while at ASU. Nevertheless, she became involved with the team, volunteering as the gymnastics team manager, setting up mats and helping the athletes prepare for their competitions.

In 2004, Borden opened a gymnastics training facility, Gold Medal Gymnastics Academy, located in Tempe, Arizona. Two years later she married Brad Cochran. In 2008, she gave birth to their first child, a daughter. They now have three children, the youngest two being boys. The couple opened a second training facility in Chandler, Arizona. Borden coaches at both facilities, focusing on uneven bars and beam. In addition to coaching gymnastics, Borden serves as a commentator on CBS Sports, Fox Sports, Turner Broadcasting, and ESPN, for gymnastics and cheerleading events. She also goes to IGC (International Gymnastics Camp) every summer to talk about her gymnastics experiences.

Now as a coach, her Olympic experiences inform her approach to her athletes, both in stressing the importance of doing gymnastics for the love of it, and in overcoming adversity. Borden's presence as an athlete was characterized by her good cheer and positive mind set, and for her perseverance through difficult times. Thinking back to her disappointment in missing the cut for the 1992 Olympic team, Borden reflects:

Definitely that was a crusher to me as an athlete, to work that hard, and to be so close, and have that feel like it was almost taken away. Now, 20 years later, I look back and I think, boy, I’m so thankful I didn’t go to ’92. I’m so thankful for what I learned through those four years of persevering and not giving up, because my moment in ’96 was incredible. I would never want to trade that.
