= Banned gymnastics skills =

Prohibited moves

Banned gymnastic skills are gymnastics moves which gymnasts are prohibited to perform, mostly due to safety concerns for the performing athletes.

== Artistic gymnastics ==
=== Women ===
Official regulation from the International Gymnastics Federation states in its Code of Points for Women, Section 14 Table of elements:

The following elements are prohibited:

- Vault – vaults with sideward take-off or landing.
- Vault – vaults with double saltos (forward and backward)
- Uneven bars – salto & dismount with take-off from two feet.
- Balance beam – dance elements with cross sit landing on balance beam.
- Floor exercise – acrobatic elements with sideward take off and/or landing into roll.

Specific gymnastics skills that are no longer allowed include:

- Korbut flip – this element requires standing on the bars, which is no longer allowed
- Thomas salto – as with other saltos that end in a roll on the floor, this is no longer allowed after injuries, particularly the paralysis of Elena Mukhina

The following gymnastics skills have a reduced score due to safety concerns:

- the Biles (balance beam dismount)

=== Men ===
The Code of Points for Men's Artistic Gymnastics states that the following are not allowed:

- Vault – salto in the first flight phase
- Vault – straddled legs in the second flight phase
- Saltos landing into roll or a jump to a prone position
- One and a half salto elements ending with landing and springing from the hands
- Strength hold elements with straddled legs, except where listed as approved elements
- Roundoff skills with a quarter turn to land facing forward

A series of skills are also prohibited for junior athletes.

== Tumbling ==
Quadruple tumbling, for youth athletes

== See also ==
- Code of Points (artistic gymnastics)
