= Julissa Gomez =

American gymnast (1972–1991)

- Full name: Julissa D'Anne Gomez
- Born: November 4, 1972 San Antonio, Texas, U.S.
- Died: August 8, 1991 (aged 18) Houston, Texas, U.S.

Gymnastics career
- Discipline: Women's artistic gymnastics
- Country represented: United States
- Club: Karolyi Gymnastics; US Acrosport; Great American Gymnastics Express
- Former coaches: Béla Károlyi; Marta Károlyi; Al Fong

Julissa D'Anne Gomez (November 4, 1972 – August 8, 1991) was an American artistic gymnast whose rapid rise through the ranks of elite gymnastics in the mid-1980s was cut short by a vaulting accident in 1988 that left her a quadriplegic. She eventually died from her injury. She was being coached by Al Fong, and had previously been coached by Béla Károlyi.

Her injury sparked major changes to the vaulting discipline of women's gymnastics with the goal of preventing such serious injuries.

== Career ==
Gomez was born in San Antonio, Texas, the older of two daughters born to a pair of former migrant farm workers from Laredo, Texas. Her parents, mother Otilia and father Ramiro, worked their way up from their farm working days to become a teacher and a welder, respectively, and struggled to keep their family together while giving 10-year-old budding gymnast Julissa a chance to train with renowned gymnastics coach Béla Károlyi in Houston. At the 1986 U.S. Championships, she placed fourth in the all-around in the junior division and won a place on the U.S. National Team. By 1987, she was representing the United States in international meets. Especially strong on the uneven bars and balance beam, Gomez was considered a legitimate contender for the 1988 U.S. Olympic team.

In mid-1987, Gomez wanted to move further up the rankings and reportedly became frustrated with Károlyi's sometimes abusive training methods. She decided to then leave the Károlyis. After briefly training at US Acrosports in Webster, Texas, Gomez's search for a new coach led her to select Al Fong, who was the trainer of another up-and-coming gymnast eager to make the 1988 Olympic team, Christy Henrich. Though her parents had vowed to keep the family together no matter where Julissa's career took her, they decided that Ramiro would move with Julissa to Blue Springs, Missouri, where Fong's gymnastics club, Great American Gymnastics Express (GAGE), was located while Otilia would remain behind until Julissa's younger sister Kristy finished school for the year.

== Injury and death ==
In May 1988, several months before the Olympics, Gomez traveled with her coach to Tokyo, Japan, to compete in the World Sports Fair. During the all-around competition, Gomez qualified for the vault finals. However, observers had noticed her struggle with the apparatus over the months leading up to the competition, including her former coach Béla Károlyi, past and present teammates, and even her present coach Al Fong. Gomez's technique on the extremely difficult Yurchenko vault had been described as shaky at best, and Gomez was unable to perform the vault with any consistency during practices, sometimes missing her feet on the springboard. A teammate from Károlyi's, Chelle Stack, later stated, "You could tell it was not a safe vault for her to be doing. Someone along the way should have stopped her." However, Julissa's coaches insisted that she needed to continue training and competing the Yurchenko vault in order to achieve high scores.

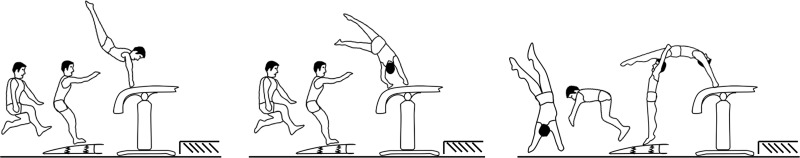
First flight phases of three common vault styles: handspring (left), Tsukahara (middle), and Yurchenko (right). Diagram shows a modern vaulting table.

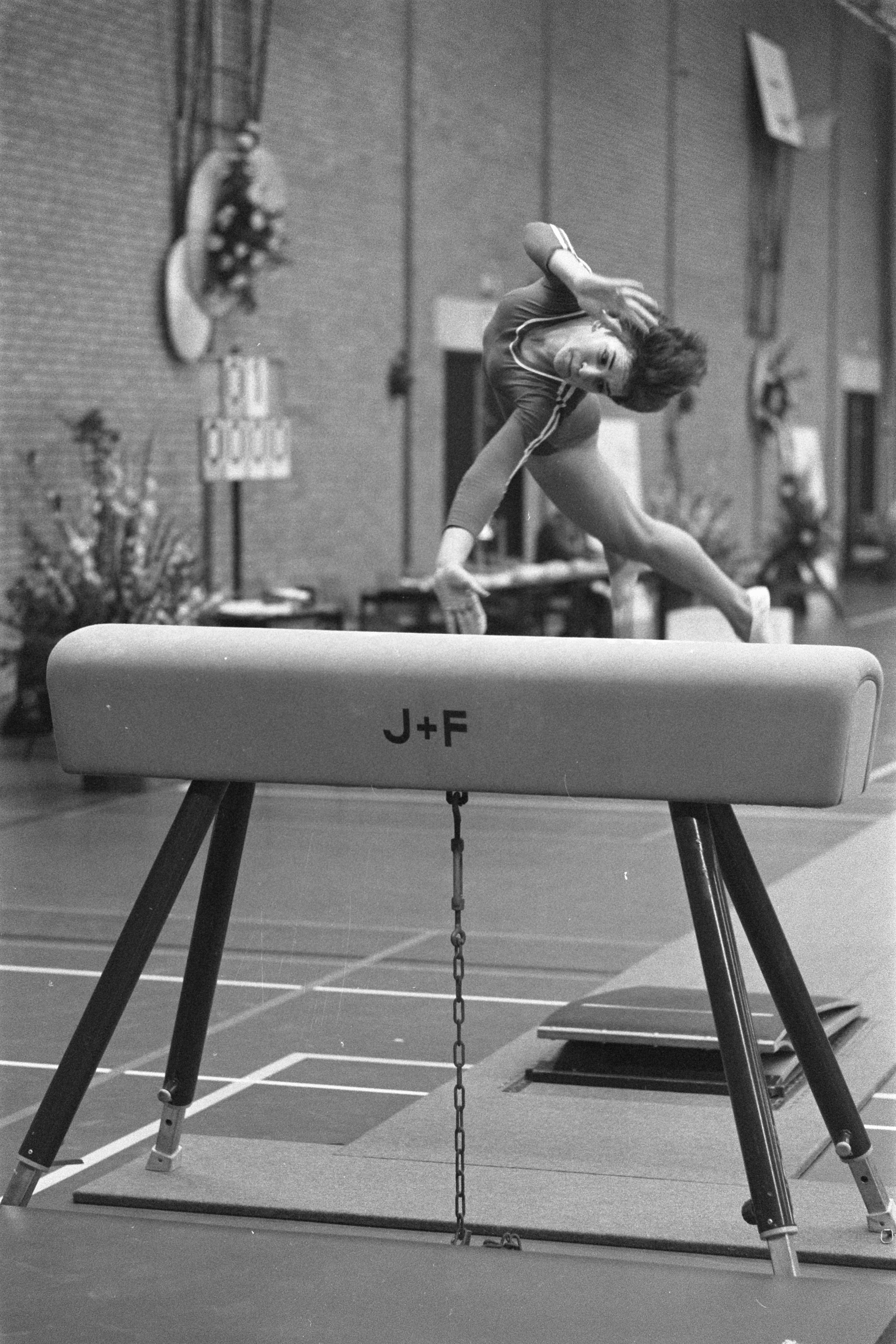
Photo from 1977 showing the vaulting horse apparatus Gomez would have been using.

During warmups for the final, held on May 5, 1988, Gomez continued to practice the Yurchenko. As she raced toward the vault on one of her practice runs, her foot slipped off the springboard and she slammed headfirst into the vaulting horse at high speed. The resulting impact paralyzed her from the neck down. A subsequent accident at a Japanese hospital, in which she became disconnected from her ventilator, resulted in severe brain damage and left her in a coma. Gomez's family cared for her for three years before she succumbed to an infection and died in August 1991 in Houston.

== Aftermath ==
Gomez's accident stands as one of the most serious to occur in artistic gymnastics, and helped prompt changes in the sport. In 1989, the International Gymnastics Federation (FIG) decided to increase vaulting safety by allowing U-shaped springboard mats to be used during competitions, which gave the gymnasts a greater margin of error in preflight and were only allowed during practice until that point. The mat is now mandatory: the 2006 FIG Code of Points specifies that performing a Yurchenko-style vault without the safety mat results in an automatic score of zero.

In 2001, the traditional vaulting horse was completely phased out and replaced by a larger, more stable vaulting table to provide gymnasts with additional safety.

== See also ==
- Elena Mukhina, a Soviet gymnast who was paralyzed in a tumbling accident in 1980 while attempting the dangerous and now-banned Thomas salto after her coach insisted that it be included in her floor routine.
- Christy Henrich, an American gymnast and teammate of Gomez, who was told she was too fat by an international gymnastics judge in 1989 and pushed by coaches to lose weight while continuing to train. Heinrich died of severe anorexia nervosa less than five years later.
- Little Girls in Pretty Boxes, book by Joan Ryan recalling Julissa Gomez's story, along with other gymnasts and figure skaters.
