= Great American Gymnastics Express =

American artistic gymnastics academy

GAGE Center
- Full name: Great American Gymnastics Center
- Nicknames: GAGE
- Sport: Artistic gymnastics
- Founded: 1979; 47 years ago
- Based in: Blue Springs, Missouri
- Colors
- Head coach: Al Fong, Armine Barutyan
- Members: Madison Desch, Brenna Dowell, Sabrina Vega, Courtney McCool, Terin Humphrey, Katelyn Ohashi, Christy Henrich, Julissa Gomez, Ivana Hong, Sarah Finnegan, Kara Eaker, Aleah Finnegan, Leanne Wong
- Website: gagecenter.com

Great American Gymnastics Express, known also as GAGE Center or GAGE, is an American artistic gymnastics academy in Blue Springs, Missouri. GAGE was founded in 1979 by Al Fong.

In December 2025, Fong was suspended for five years by the U.S. Center for SafeSport; his wife, also a coach at the gym, received a one-year suspension. Two months later, USA Gymnastics terminated the gym's membership over allegations of abuse and non-compliance with safety codes and suspensions. Fong and his wife were permanently suspended by both organizations in September 2026.

== Notable alumni ==
Among the gymnasts who trained at GAGE are:

- Lynnzee Brown, 2024 Olympian (representing Haiti)
- Madison Desch, a gold medalist with the U.S. team at the 2014 World Championships
- Brenna Dowell, a 2015 World Championships team champion and four-time NCAA champion
- Kara Eaker, a two-time World Championships team gold medalist
- Aleah Finnegan, 2024 Olympian (representing the Philippines), 2019 Pan American Games team champion
- Sarah Finnegan, a two-time NCAA champion
- Christy Henrich, a 1989 World Championships competitor
- Ivana Hong, a 2007 World Championships team champion
- Terin Humphrey, a 2004 Olympic Games team and uneven bars silver medalist and two-time NCAA champion
- Courtney McCool, a 2004 Olympic Games team silver medalist and four-time NCAA champion
- Leanne Wong, a 2022 World Championships team gold medalist

== Controversies ==
=== Death of Julissa Gomez ===
In May 1988, Julissa Gomez broke her neck while warming up for the vault at a competition in Japan. Observers had noticed her struggle with the apparatus over the months leading up to the competition, including her former coach Béla Károlyi, past and present teammates, and even her own coach, Al Fong. Gomez's technique on the extremely difficult Yurchenko vault had been described as shaky at best, and Gomez was unable to perform the vault with consistency during practices, sometimes missing her feet on the springboard. A teammate from Károlyi's, Chelle Stack, later said, "You could tell it was not a safe vault for her to be doing. Someone along the way should have stopped her." However, Gomez's coaches insisted that she needed to continue training and competing the Yurchenko vault to achieve high scores. Gomez fell into a coma during treatment due to a hospital error and never awoke. She died in 1991.

=== Death of Christy Henrich ===
In 1994, Christy Henrich died from anorexia nervosa. Her condition was allegedly spurred by comments from international judges and her coaches. Desperate to move up the ranks in the highly competitive world of Olympic-level gymnastics, Henrich took the criticisms to heart; her drive to lose a few pounds progressed to unhealthy eating habits and, eventually, became full-blown anorexia nervosa. She weighed 47 pounds when she died. Her death led to changes in the way coaches across the nation implement nutrition in training, and how television and media discuss gymnasts' bodies.

=== U.S. Center for SafeSport suspensions ===
In 2020, Fong became the subject of a U.S. Center for SafeSport investigation into about 40 allegations of emotional, verbal, and physical abuse. In December 2025, Fong was suspended for five years; his wife, Armine Barutyan, also a GAGE coach, was suspended for one year. In February 2026, USA Gymnastics suspended the woman appointed by the Fongs to run the gym in their absence; days later, her replacement was similarly suspended, and the organization terminated the gym's membership over allegations of abuse and non-compliance with safety codes and suspensions. In September, Fong and Barutyan were permanently suspended by USA Gymnastics and SafeSport.
