= Christy Henrich =

American gymnast (1972–1994)

- Full name: Christina Renée Henrich
- Nickname: Christy
- Born: July 18, 1972
- Died: July 26, 1994 (aged 22) Kansas City, Missouri, U.S.

Gymnastics career
- Discipline: Women's artistic gymnastics
- Country represented: United States
- Club: GAGE

Christina "Christy" Renée Henrich (July 18, 1972 – July 26, 1994) was an American artistic gymnast. Her death from anorexia nervosa at age 22 led to major reforms in the way women's gymnastics is covered on television and in the news media. She was coached by Al Fong.

== Early career ==
Training with Al Fong at the Great American Gymnastics Express (GAGE) club in Blue Springs, Missouri, Henrich made the U.S. national gymnastics team in 1986 after placing fifth all-around in the junior division at the U.S. National Championships. She continued to climb through the elite ranks over the next four years, placing ninth at the 1988 Olympic Trials and winning the silver medal in the all-around at the 1989 U.S. National Championships.

She represented the United States at the 1989 World Championships in Stuttgart, placing fourth with the American team, and just missing a medal in the uneven bars final. One of Henrich's original balance beam leaps was named after her in the Code of Points through the 2001—2005 Code, though her name was removed from the element thereafter.

== Weight issues ==
Though Henrich was succeeding in gymnastics, a judge at an international meet in 1989 told her bluntly that she was fat and needed to lose weight. The perception of Henrich's weight being too high was fueled further by the culture of elite gymnastics, which was dominated by "pixies"—small, underweight, prepubescent girls. Her own coach, Al Fong—coach of the late Julissa Gomez, who also reportedly felt pushed into practicing the difficult Yurchenko vault until she was rendered quadriplegic in a vaulting accident—had also allegedly made insulting remarks about her size and body type. Desperate to move up the ranks in the highly competitive world of Olympic-level gymnastics, Henrich took the criticisms to heart; her drive to lose a few pounds progressed to disordered eating habits and, eventually, the development of anorexia nervosa.

At first, neither her family nor her coaches were aware of the situation. She tied for second place on uneven bars at the USA Gymnastics National Championships in June 1990, but soon after, her battle with anorexia took such a toll on her health that she was no longer strong enough to compete, and she was asked to leave GAGE. She retired from the sport in January 1991. Despite many early treatments and hospitalizations, her weight deteriorated to 47 pounds (21 kg). Henrich died of multiple organ failure on July 26, 1994.

== Aftermath ==
Henrich's death brought the problem of eating disorders in women's gymnastics into the spotlight. Gymnasts such as Kathy Johnson and Cathy Rigby admitted to having periods of disordered eating that resembled anorexia and bulimia, and other U.S. National Team gymnasts stepped forward and went public about their own eating disorders and disordered eating.

The focus on gymnast wellness was addressed with several programs on both the national and international levels, such as educational videos, nutrition counseling and classes, to varying degrees of success.

Additionally, television channels broadcasting gymnastics competitions, such as NBC-TV and ABC-TV, stopped commenting about or listing gymnasts' weights in captions in the mid-1990s.

== Personal life ==
Henrich was engaged to Bo Moreno from the age of 18 until her death after the two met at high school in Independence, Missouri.

== See also ==
- Little Girls in Pretty Boxes, a book about the hard lives of female gymnasts and figure skaters
- Julissa Gomez, an American gymnast paralyzed in a vaulting accident at a 1988 meet in Japan while attempting the difficult-to-master Yurchenko vault
- Elena Mukhina, a Soviet gymnast paralyzed in a tumbling accident in 1980 while attempting the later-banned Thomas salto
- List of deaths from anorexia nervosa
