= Perfect Body =

1997 American drama television film

- Genre: Drama; Family; Sport
- Written by: Melissa Gould
- Directed by: Douglas Barr
- Starring: Amy Jo Johnson; Brett Cullen; Cathy Rigby; Wendie Malick; Ray Baker
- Music by: Pray for Rain
- Country of origin: United States
- Original language: English

Production
- Executive producers: Judith A. Polone; Harry Winer
- Producer: Judy Cairo
- Cinematography: Karl Herrmann
- Editor: Mark Conte
- Running time: 100 minutes
- Production companies: The Polone-Winer Company; NBC Studios

Original release
- Network: NBC
- Release: September 8, 1997

Perfect Body is a 1997 American drama television film about a young gymnast who develops an eating disorder. It originally aired on NBC on September 8, 1997. It has since aired on Lifetime and ABC Family and been released on DVD. The film stars former Power Rangers and Felicity actress Amy Jo Johnson and gymnast/actress Cathy Rigby who suffered from an eating disorder in her youth.

== Plot ==
Andie Bradley (Johnson) is a gymnast whose ambition is to participate in the Olympics. When offered the opportunity to train with one of the leading coaches in the U.S., she gratefully accepts. This requires her to move to Seattle from Portland. When she attends her first session, she is scrutinized by the coach about her weight and feels the pressure to lose the pounds. At first she adopts a sensible diet, but it soon leads to excessive calorie restriction. When she hangs out with a fellow team member, Leslie (Tara Boger), Leslie tells her that there are ways around it and encourages her to self-induce vomiting, saying, "You can eat what you want, and not gain a pound." Andie continues restricting her calories, but when she cannot help eating due to extreme hunger, she resorts to purging methods.

Her mom notices changes in her weight, while her boyfriend and best friend also notice changes in her attitude. Andie eventually tells her best friend that she sees the changes and can't stop her behavior. She faints twice, both during competitions, and goes to the hospital, after fainting the second time, where a doctor talks to her parents about her health problems. Her parents decide that she and her mother will move back home. Refusing to leave her training, Andie runs away to the gym, where she sees a new girl being given the same lecture about her weight that was given to her. She decides that she is not ready to go back to training. After moving back to Portland, Andie joins a support group where she is encouraged to eat as part of her therapy. At the end of the movie, she is seen walking into the school gymnasium and getting back on the balance beam.

== Cast ==
- Amy Jo Johnson as Andie Bradley
- Brett Cullen as Coach David Blair
- Wendie Malick as Janet Bradley
- Ray Baker as Elliot Bradley
- Tara Boger as Leslie Reynolds
- Ron Melendez as Josh
- Julie Patzwald as Holly Simmons
- Cathy Rigby as Brenda Gray

== See also ==
- Christy Henrich
- Little Girls in Pretty Boxes
