= Al Fong =

American gymnastics coach (born c. 1953)

Alvin Fong (born c. 1953) is an American gymnastics coach and founder of Great American Gymnastics Express, a gymnastics club in Blue Springs, Missouri. Fong coached Julissa Gomez and Christy Henrich, Olympic hopefuls for the 1988 Seoul Olympics, who died after a competition accident and from anorexia, respectively. He has since coached two Olympic silver medalists: Terin Humphrey and Courtney McCool.

In 2026, USA Gymnastics and SafeSport permanently banned Fong from coaching after an investigation substantiated allegations of verbal, physical, and emotional abuse.

== Career ==
A second-generation Chinese-American, born and raised in Seattle, Washington, Fong earned a gymnastics scholarship to Louisiana State University. In 1975, he graduated and became a gymnastics coach. In 1979, Fong started his own gym, the Great American Gymnastics Express (also known as GAGE Center), in Blue Springs, Missouri.

In the 1980s, Fong coached Julissa Gomez and Christy Henrich. Gomez died after breaking her neck while performing a Yurchenko vault. Henrich died from complications of anorexia nervosa. After Henrich's death, Fong stopped coaching elite gymnastics and instead taught after-school programs for some time.

In the early 2000s, Fong coached Terin Humphrey and Courtney McCool at GAGE Center. At a selection camp for the 2003 World Championships, Humphrey was selected as a second alternate. She was not allowed to practice with the U.S. team. Fong commented that the experience was very painful and said Humphrey should have been picked to compete.

At the 2004 Athens Olympics, Humphrey and McCool helped the U.S. team win the team silver medal; Humphrey also took silver in individual uneven bars. Fong also told reporters that South Korean officials did not properly lodge a protest against the scoring of American gymnast Paul Hamm in the men's all-around competition.

In 2007, he acknowledged "yelling or screaming" at his gymnasts in the 1980s, but told ESPN that he had since adopted a calmer style.

In 2019, Fong coached Leanne Wong and Kara Eaker.

In 2020, Fong became the subject of an investigation by U.S. Center for SafeSport into about 40 allegations of verbal, physical, and emotional abuse. On December 22, 2025, Fong was suspended for five years; his wife, Armine Barutyan, was given a one-year suspension. On September 11, 2026, both were made permanently ineligible to coach due to emotional and physical misconduct, abuse of process, and retaliation.

== Athlete deaths ==
=== Julissa Gomez and the Yurchenko vault ===
Julissa Gomez broke her neck while performing a Yurchenko vault in 1988 during the World Sports Fair in Japan, just before the 1988 Olympic trials. She died as a result of her injuries in hospital. After the accident, Fong said: "One thing is certain...Julissa certainly wouldn't want national team members to stop competing, or want me to quit being the coach that I am". Some coaches supported banning the vault entirely after Gomez's accident, but Fong said that "a lot of the coaches are concerned about the hysteria going on about this vault[...]This could hamper the development of the sport." He said that banning the vault would put the United States even further behind the Soviets and suggested that coaches should teach the vault to gymnasts when they are younger so they will have more time to develop it. Fong had pressured Gomez to attempt the vault.

Another one of Fong's gymnasts, Karen Tierney, cracked the C-1 vertebra in her neck when she landed on her head performing the Yurchenko vault at the U.S. Olympic Festival in 1987. Tierney had decided she would not perform the skill anymore after the accident and has said that Fong continued to encourage her to perform it anyway. Fong insists that he did not pressure Tierney to continue performing the Yurchenko.

=== Christy Henrich ===
He coached Christy Henrich, who missed the 1988 Seoul Olympics by .188. Henrich developed anorexia nervosa after a judge told her she was too heavy at 93 pounds to make the Olympic team. As a result of her illness, she was unable to compete after 1990. She retired from the sport in 1991 and died from multiple organ system failure in 1994 at age 22. She weighed 47 lbs at the time of her death. Fong had stopped coaching Christy in 1989 and has said that he "kicked her out of the gym for her own good" adding that she had lost the strength needed to complete her routines safely. Henrich said that Fong called her the "Pillsbury Dough Boy", which Fong has denied.

Fong stopped coaching elite gymnastics for a time after Henrich's death. The best gymnasts left his gym and his reputation as a coach was damaged. He taught after-school programs for a time, until he met nine-year-old Terin Humphrey.

== Personal life ==
Fong is married to former Soviet gymnast Armine Barutyan-Fong, who was a gymnastics coach at GAGE Center. Together they have a daughter.
