= Little Girls in Pretty Boxes =

1995 nonfiction book by Joan Ryan

Little Girls in Pretty Boxes: The Making and Breaking of Elite Gymnasts and Figure Skaters
- Author: Joan Ryan
- Language: English
- Subject: Sports--Moral and ethical aspects--United States
- Genre: non-fiction
- Publisher: Doubleday Books
- Publication date: 1995
- Publication place: United States
- Pages: 243 (first edition)
- ISBN: 9780385477901
- OCLC: 479803474
- Dewey Decimal: 796.44/0835/2
- LC Class: GV464 .R93 1995

Little Girls in Pretty Boxes: The Making and Breaking of Elite Gymnasts and Figure Skaters is a 1995 nonfiction book by San Francisco Chronicle sports writer Joan Ryan detailing the difficult training regimens endured by young girls in competitive sports such as gymnastics and figure skating, published by Doubleday Books. Ryan's material was largely derived from personal interviews with nearly 100 former gymnasts and figure skaters as well as trainers, sports psychologists, physiologists, and other experts, focusing on the physical and emotional hardships young girls endured for the sake of Olympic glory.

== Advocacy ==
Ryan began writing the book after performing research for a series of articles initially published in the San Francisco Chronicle, where she was working as a sportswriter.

The book criticized contemporary training practices. In a 2018 interview, Ryan stated the thesis of the book was that abuse had become part of the normal culture of these sports. Ryan argues that the image of these athletes' beauty, glamour, class, and sophistication conceals a troubled reality of physical problems (weakened bones, stunted growth, debilitating and fatal injuries), psychological issues (eating disorders, depression, and low self-esteem), and life sacrifices (dropping out of school, losing the chance to "be a child", and becoming isolated from their peers and families). While decrying these practices, Ryan advocates for systemic change in figure skating and gymnastics, calling for raised minimum-age requirements, mandatory licenses for coaches, careful scrutiny by national governing bodies, and a requirement for athletes to remain in regular schools at least until they are 16.

In the United States, it’s a culture that has been so influenced by Eastern Europe, really because of Bela Karolyi. He came over here after Nadia Comăneci, and he brought his system with him, which was a system of abuse. His job, and he says this, his job was to create gymnasts, not to create healthy young women. And other coaches followed his lead. American coaches followed his lead, because, frankly, it worked. He did create great gymnasts. Of course, we didn’t see all the bodies of the girls who didn’t make it.

— Joan Ryan, 2018 Slate interview

Critics of the book claimed Ryan presented a relatively one-sided, bleak view of the sports, ignoring successes like Mary Lou Retton. Bela Karolyi was singled out for particular criticism in the book for his influence on USA Gymnastics (USAG), which resulted in what she called "a system of abuse". Ryan's general points have been supported by medical experts, as noted in a 1996 report published in the New England Journal of Medicine describing the emotional and physical harm suffered by elite female gymnasts.

When Ryan was working on an update to the book in 2000, she interviewed Nancy Thies Marshall, a former gymnast who was then directing USAG's wellness program. The wellness program had been formed in response to the criticism USAG had received after the initial publication of the book in 1995. Marshall had written a 100-page manual with 30 recommendations and a referral network, but the wellness program had its budget slashed in half by the time Ryan contacted Marshall, and Marshall resigned shortly thereafter in 2001. The manual was praised by former US national sports team physician and convicted serial child molester Larry Nassar in the introduction.

== Reception ==
The review published by the San Francisco Chronicle, where Ryan was a sportswriter, called the book a "scathing and profoundly important study."

Ann Sjoerdsma, reviewing for the Tampa Bay Times, added the book was "a damning indictment of girls' gymnastics and figure skating" and wondered "if the traumas and trials that the champions undergo can ever be worth their sacrifice. Conspicuously absent here are happy voices. I would have liked to have heard from the 'success stories'" such as Shannon Miller, Retton, Kristi Yamaguchi, or Nancy Kerrigan.

== Film adaptation ==
A made for television movie based on the book and starring Swoosie Kurtz and Courtney Peldon aired in 1997 on Lifetime Television. It portrays a fictionalized account of a teenage girl whose family relocates to Los Angeles to pursue Olympic gold with a difficult coach and rigorous schedule, drawing on many of the stories Ryan recounts in the book. It depicts young female gymnasts dealing with prescription painkiller abuse, skipping meals, enduring intimidation, and generally pushing their bodies to the breaking point in order to achieve perfection.

== Publication history ==
- — (May 1, 1995). Little Girls in Pretty Boxes (1st ed.). Doubleday. ISBN 978-0385477901.
- — (2000). Little Girls in Pretty Boxes (Revised ed.). Warner Books. ISBN 9780446676823.
- — (April 3, 2013). Little Girls in Pretty Boxes (eBook ed.). Doubleday. ISBN 9780307828552.
- — (July 17, 2018). Little Girls in Pretty Boxes (New ed.). Grand Central Publishing. ISBN 9781538747780.

== See also ==
- Julissa Gomez
- Christy Henrich
- Elena Mukhina
- Perfect Body
