= Brian Patrick Clarke =

American actor (born 1952)

- Born: August 1, 1952 (age 74); Gettysburg, Pennsylvania, U.S.
- Occupation: Actor
- Spouse: Kathy Johnson
- Children: 2

Brian Patrick Clarke (born August 1, 1952) is an American actor. He has appeared in many television series and features.

== Early life ==
Clarke was born in Gettysburg, Pennsylvania.

Clarke, a punter, was a three-time varsity football letterwinner at Yale University, playing for Carmen Cozza in the early seventies.

== Career ==
Clarke starred as Greg Marmalard on the TV sitcom Delta House. He played a recurring character for two seasons on the comedy-drama Eight is Enough, Merle "The Pearl" Stockwell, a professional baseball player who marries middle sister, Susan (Susan Richardson).

He has made guest appearances on many TV series, including Baywatch, Party of Five, ER, CSI: Miami, and Drop Dead Diva. He has appeared on the soap operas General Hospital, The Bold and the Beautiful, The Young and the Restless, and Sunset Beach.

=== Film ===
- (1978) Blood and Guts, directed by Paul Lynch - Role: Jim Davenport
- (1988) Sleepaway Camp II: Unhappy Campers, directed by Michael A. Simpson - Role: T.C.
- (2007) Sydney White, directed by Joe Nussbaum - Role: Professor Carleton
- (2012) To Write Love on Her Arms, directed by Nathan Frankowski - Role: Tom Yohe

== Personal life ==
Clarke is married to Olympian artistic gymnast and sports commentator Kathy Johnson. They have two sons, Sean, a pole vaulter who competed for the University of Pennsylvania and was a two-time All-American, jumping 5.50 (18'1/2"), as well as Texas A&M during grad school in 2021, and Cary from a previous marriage. They reside in Orlando, Florida.

He has run several marathons, including a sub three-hour marathon in Los Angeles in the late 1980s.
