= Gymnastics elements named after Simone Biles =

Moves in gymnastics

There are five elements in the women's artistic gymnastics (WAG) Code of Points named after American gymnast Simone Biles: two on vault, one on balance beam, and two on floor exercise.

== Vault ==
=== Biles ===
Biles debuted her vault, a roundoff, back handspring with half turn entry; front stretched somersault with 2 twists (an upgrade from the Cheng) at the selection camp for the 2018 World Championships. During qualifications at the 2018 World Championships Biles landed the new vault and it was therefore named after her and assigned a difficulty value of 6.4, tying it as the second-most difficult vault in WAG with the Produnova, then valued at 6.4. It has since been downgraded to a value of 6.0, as has the Produnova, keeping them tied for the second-most difficult vault in WAG. As of May 2026, Biles is the only woman who has performed the Biles vault.

=== Biles II ===
At the 2021 U.S. Classic Biles debuted a Yurchenko double pike vault, which no woman had ever competed. She submitted the skill to be added to the code of points at the Olympic Games in Tokyo. It was assigned a temporary difficulty of 6.6, which would make it the most difficult vault in Women's Artistic Gymnastics. However, Biles did not perform the vault at the Olympics; she withdrew from most event finals after experiencing "the twisties", a psychological phenomenon causing a gymnast to lose air awareness while performing twisting elements.

At the 2023 World Championships in Antwerp, Belgium, Biles completed the vault. It was assigned a difficulty of 6.4, making it the most difficult move on this apparatus in WAG. Biles incurred a neutral deduction of 0.5 for having her coach on the mat as a spotter for safety.

== Balance beam ==
=== Biles ===
Biles started training the double-twisting double-tucked salto backwards dismount off of the balance beam in 2013, but did not perform it during the 2013–16 quad, including the Olympics. Before her 2018 comeback, Biles posted a video teasing new upgrades, including the double-double dismount off of the balance beam. Biles debuted the dismount at the 2019 U.S. National Championships. She submitted it as a new skill at the 2019 World Championships, where it was given the rating H, the highest of any skill performed on the balance beam. Nevertheless, Biles said the rating undervalued the skill, citing similar maneuvers on other apparatuses. Wrote Cassandra Negley of Yahoo Sports:

"The full-in (full-twisting (1/1) double tucked salto backwards) is an E on floor and a G on beam. That's a two-tenths rise. The double-double on floor is H, three-tenths higher, so Biles believes the move on the beam should also be three-tenths higher than a G."

USA Gymnastics backed Biles; during domestic events over the summer, USAG assigned the skill a provisional I rating. FIG officials said they had given the lower rating so it would not entice gymnasts to take the "added risk in landing of double saltos for Beam dismounts (with/without twists), including a potential landing on the neck." Many people noted that FIG was not always so concerned about safety. British gymnast Ruby Harrold noted that FIG does not "allow a warm-up immediately prior to event finals". Others noted that Jamaican gymnast Danusia Francis has requested, and been denied, an extra mat to make her balance beam dismount safer. Some argued that Biles was being penalized for being able to safely perform skills that are so difficult that it would be reckless for other gymnasts to even attempt them. However, others noted that Biles is not the first gymnast to have a skill undervalued by the FIG Women's Technical Committee and that several of her other eponymous skills are rated correctly.

Biles performed the new dismount during qualifications at the 2019 World Championships and the skill was therefore named after her.

== Floor exercise ==
=== Biles ===
Biles debuted a floor exercise skill, a double layout with a half twist, at podium training for the 2013 U.S. Classic, eight years after London Phillips completed it domestically in 2005. Biles later completed the skill at the 2013 World Championships and the skill was therefore named after her. Six years later, Trinity Thomas performed the Biles at the 2019 U.S. National Championships, becoming the third woman to do so. Gabrielle Clark completed the Biles in 2021 at the LA Gold gymnastic meet in Baton Rouge, Louisiana.

At the 2023 World Championships, Hillary Heron of Panama became the first gymnast to perform one of Biles' named skills at a major international competition.

==== Gymnasts who have completed the Biles (FX) ====
As of May 2026, five gymnasts have completed the Biles on floor exercise.

- Simone Biles (USA)
- Gabrielle "Brie" Clark (USA)
- Hillary Heron (PAN)
- London Phillips (USA)
- Trinity Thomas (USA)

=== Biles II ===
Biles started training a triple-twisting double-tucked salto backwards (upgraded from a Silivas) in 2013. In 2019, she performed it at the U.S. Classic during podium training but not the competition. The first time Biles completed the maneuver in competition was at the 2019 U.S. National Championships, joining male gymnasts Ri Jong Song of North Korea and Kenzo Shirai and Kohei Uchimura, both of Japan. Biles completed the skill during qualification at the 2019 World Championships, and it was therefore named after her. It was given the rating J, making it the highest-rated skill across all apparatuses in Women's Artistic Gymnastics.

No other woman had completed the skill as of May 2026, although American gymnasts Jade Carey and MyKayla Skinner have posted videos of them training the skill. During podium training at the 2021 U.S. Classic, Carey performed the laid-out version of this skill, which she submitted to be added to the code of points at the 2020 Olympic Games. It was assigned a difficulty of K, but Carey never competed the skill during competition.
