= Handspring (gymnastics) =

Acrobatic move

A front handspring, performed as part of an acro dance routine.

A handspring (also flic-flac or flip-flop) is an acrobatic move in which a person executes a complete revolution of the body by lunging headfirst from an upright position into an inverted vertical position and then pushing off (i.e., "springing") from the floor with the hands so as to leap back to an upright position. The direction of body rotation in a handspring may be either forward or backward, and either kind may be performed from a stationary standing position or while in motion.

Handsprings are performed in various physical activities, including acro dance, cheerleading and gymnastics. In competitive activities, handsprings may be judged on a number of criteria.

== Description ==
=== Types ===
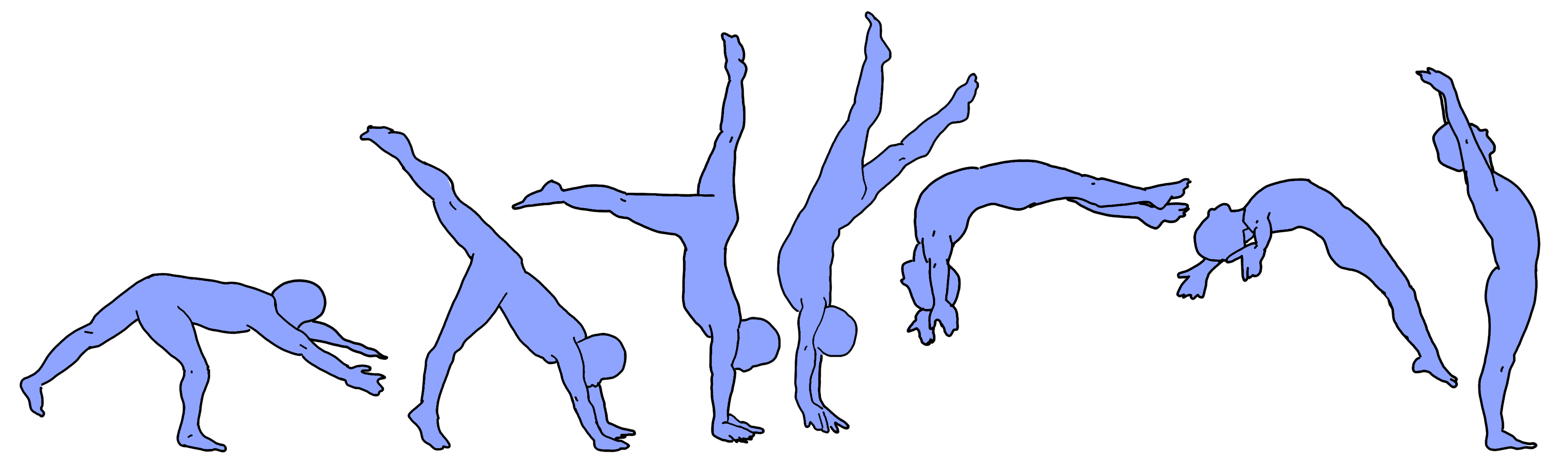
Illustration of front handspring

The direction of body rotation in a handspring may be either forward or backward, resulting in a front handspring or back handspring, respectively. In a back handspring, the performer does not see where the hands will land until after the move has begun.

A standing handspring is one that begins from a stationary standing position. For example, a back handspring that begins with the performer in a stationary standing position is a standing back handspring.

Body movement may be terminated upon completion of a handspring, or the performer's momentum may be leveraged so as to immediately perform another handspring or other rotational move (e.g., a flip or somersault), such as a tuck or layout. Similarly, another rotational move (e.g., a roundoff) may precede a handspring in order to develop sufficient momentum for the handspring.

== In gymnastics ==
In artistic gymnastics, handsprings are commonly performed in the floor exercise, vault, and balance beam events. Back handsprings on the floor are typically preceded by a roundoff, and the two skills together provide the gymnast acceleration and power to perform backward somersaults.

=== Technique ===
A standing back handspring begins with a three phase sequence. In the first phase, the gymnast stands up straight on flat feet. In the second, the gymnast swings the arms down by the sides of the torso, bends the knees, and sits back as if sitting in a chair; while in this position, the gymnast is unbalanced. In the last phase, the gymnast swings both arms up by the ears, uses the back muscles to propel the upper body, and jumps into the air. The gymnast transitions to an arch position, with the head in a neutral position, arms and legs straight, and feet together; this body shape is maintained until the hands contact the floor. With hands on the floor, the body's angular momentum is used to transform the gymnast's body shape from an arch, through a linear shape, to a "hollow" shape. The hands are then pushed against the floor, causing the body to lift off from the floor while the body continues its feet-first rotation. Finally, the feet land on the floor, behind the body's center of gravity, and the remaining angular momentum is depleted as it carries the gymnast to a stationary standing position. Handsprings are performed on the balance beam with more vertical and less horizontal force compared to those performed on the floor, perhaps to make it easier to place the hands on the narrow beam.

=== Variations ===
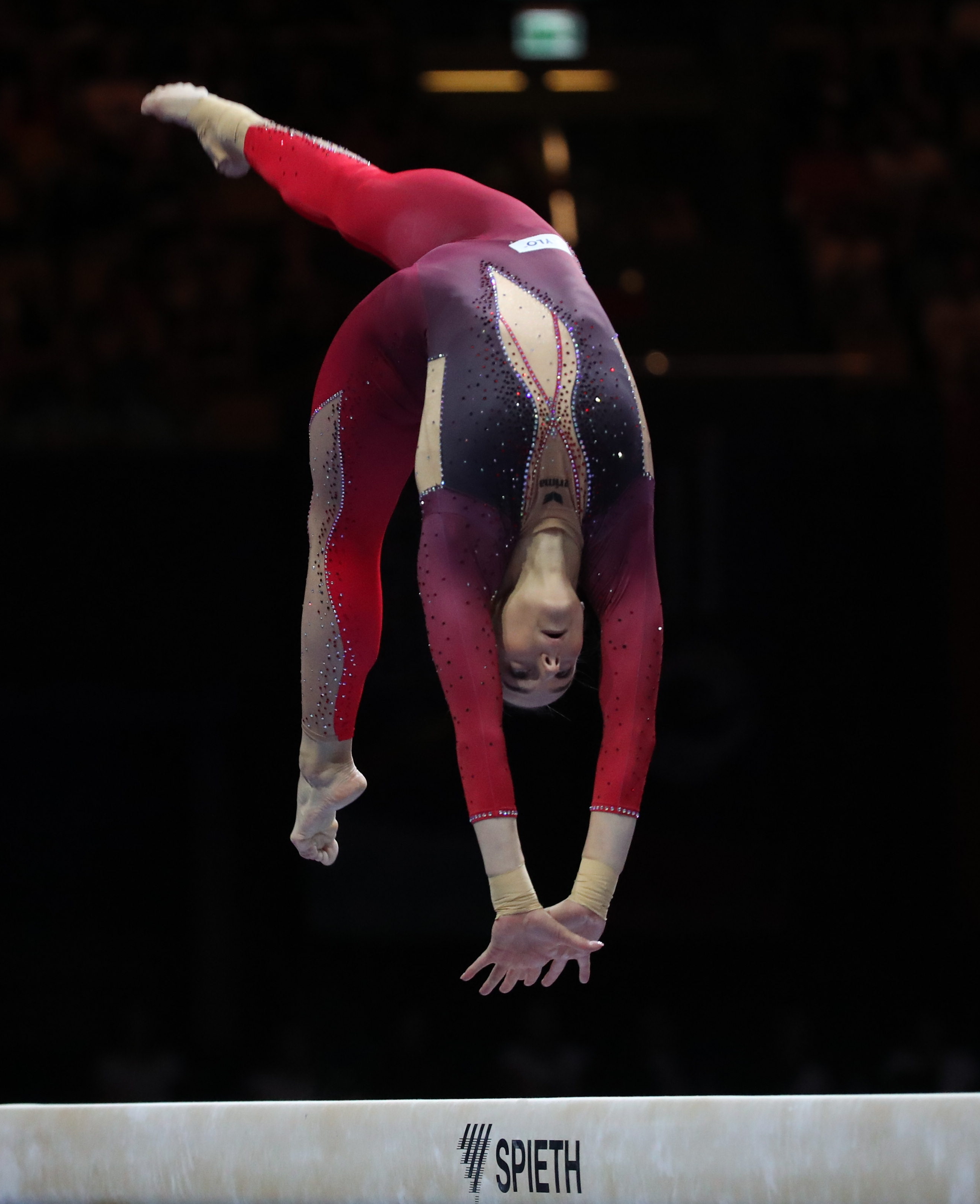
Pauline Schäfer performing a back handspring step-out on beam

A front handspring can be started from a stationary standing position, but it is more common for gymnasts to hurdle into front handsprings at a run. It is also possible to precede a front handspring with a "step out", which is similar to a handspring but lands one foot at a time and can be performed on beam the same way it is performed on floor.

A variation of the back handspring often performed on the balance beam is called the "back handspring step-out". In this variation, the gymnast splits the legs upon takeoff, attains a full split when inverted, and lands one foot at a time. This variation is often used at the beginning of combinations with other elements and involves less force on the gymnast's arms after making hand contact with the beam.

Practicing an Onodi on the floor

Some handspring variations involve twists. The Worley consists of a back handspring with a half twist in the first flight phase that turns it into a front handspring. Other skills involve partial handsprings, such as the Onodi, which is a back handspring with a half twist in the first flight phase to a front walkover after the gymnast is in handstand.

Handsprings are used to generate power for vault. The simplest vault performed at competitions consists of a front handspring with the repulsion performed from the vault surface. Vaults are grouped depending on whether the handspring is performed forward or backwards and by whether there is a twist in the air as the gymnast springs onto the vault. For example, the Tsukahara vault family uses a twisting front handspring, while the Yurchenko vaults use a back handspring.

In another variation of a front handspring, called a flyspring, the gymnast's feet are held together from beginning to end. Therefore, in order to do a flyspring, the gymnast must jump into it.

== See also ==
- Roundoff
- Somersault
