= Roundoff =

Move in gymnastics

A roundoff is a move in gymnastics similar to a cartwheel, except the gymnast lands with two feet placed together on the ground instead of one foot at a time, facing the direction of arrival. It was also sometimes called an arabian handspring.

The roundoff is a gymnastic technique that turns horizontal speed into vertical speed and can be used to turn forward impulse from a run into backwards impulse. Roundoffs are used by most acrobatic sports, including gymnastics, dancing, and cheerleading.

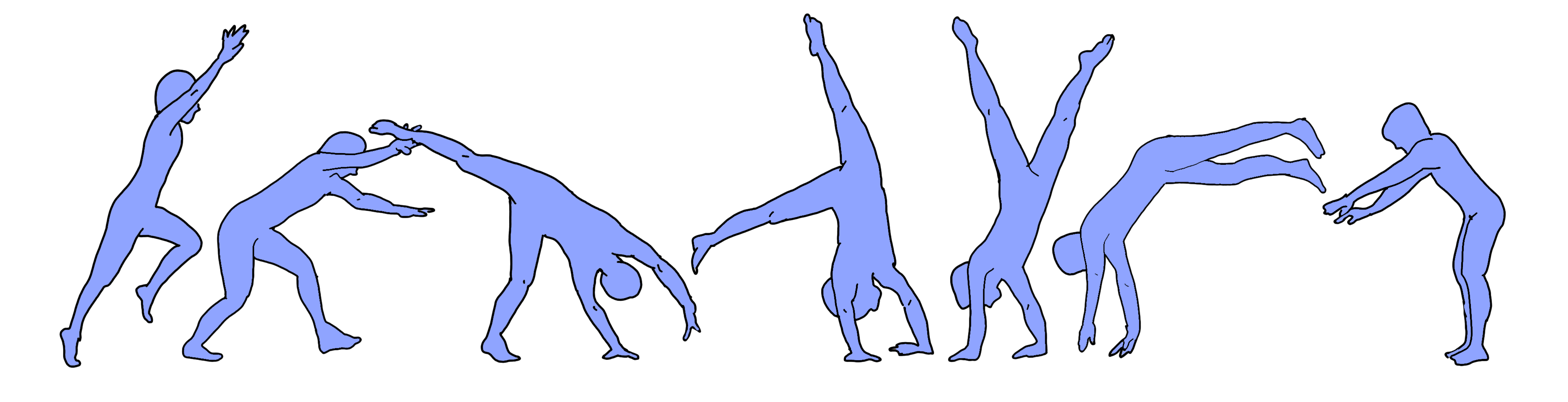
Illustration of the roundoff movement

== Description ==
A boy demonstrates a roundoff followed by a back handspring

The roundoff is a gymnastic technique that turns horizontal speed into vertical speed (to jump higher); it is also used effectively to turn forward momentum from a run into backwards momentum, giving speed and power to backwards moves such as flips and somersaults.

The roundoff is similar to a cartwheel, except the gymnast lands with two feet placed together on the ground instead of one foot at a time, facing the direction they arrived from. This is achieved by twisting the hands and shoulders as the hands are placed on the ground. The two hands are generally placed down one after the other, so that the first hand is twisted by 90 degrees and the second hand by almost 180 degrees from the direction of travel. This creates a handstand position facing the opposite direction the gymnast started in, which they then snap their hips down quickly to create backwards momentum.
