= Yurchenko vault family =

Type of vault in artistic gymnastics

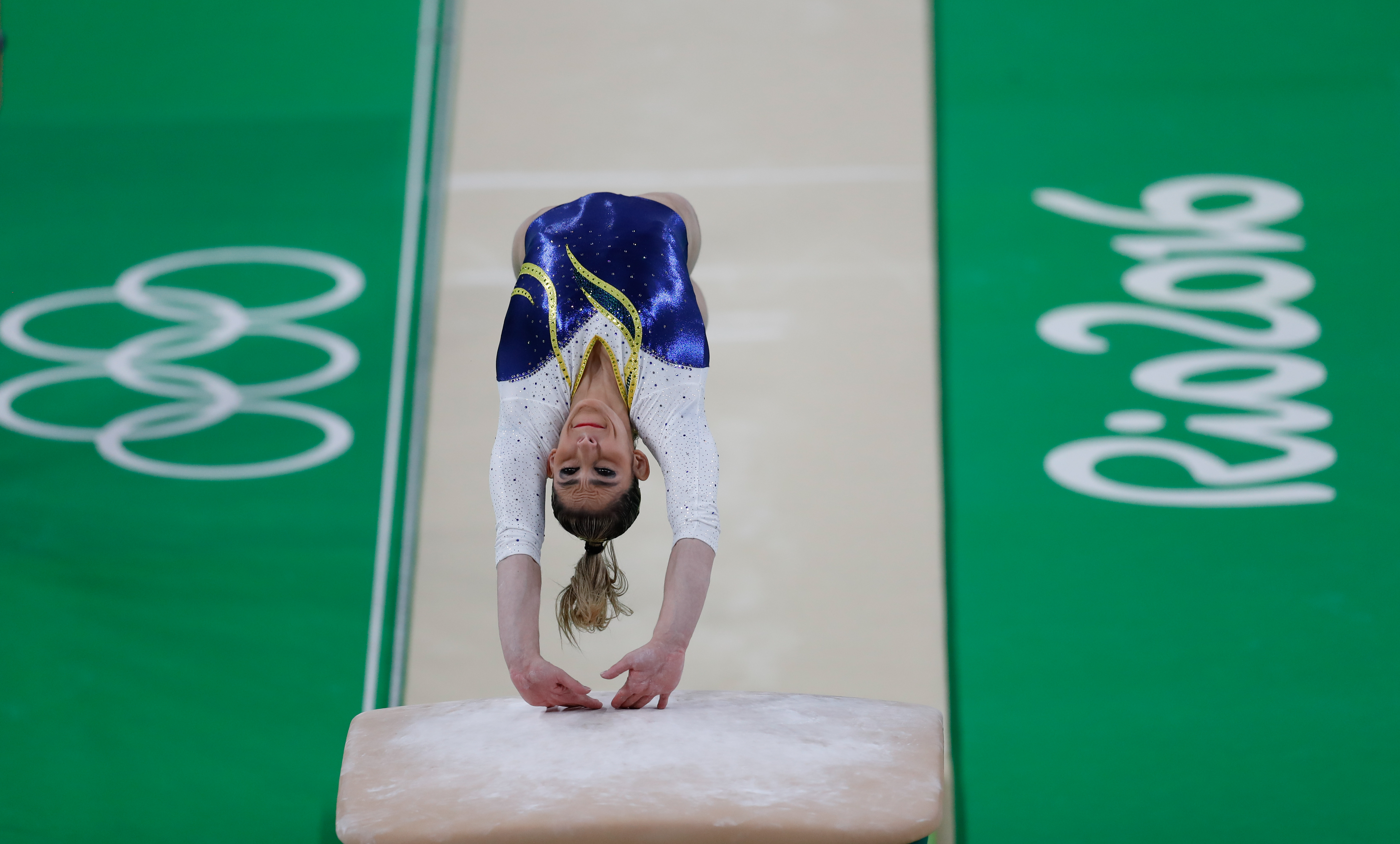
Daniele Hypólito performing a Yurchenko-style vault at the 2016 Summer Olympics

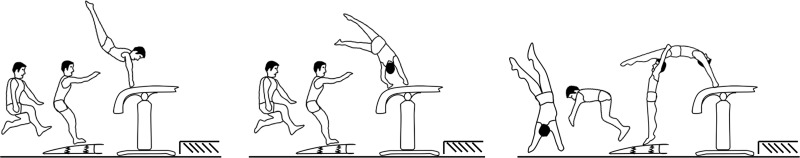
The three families of vaults in order from left to right: handspring, Tsukahara, and Yurchenko

Yurchenko vaults, also known as round-off entry vaults, are a family of vaults performed in artistic gymnastics in which the gymnast does a round-off onto the springboard and a back handspring onto the horse or vaulting table. The gymnast then performs a salto, which may range in difficulty from a simple single tuck to a triple twist layout. Different variations in the difficulty of the salto lead to higher D-scores. This family of vaults is the most common type of vault in gymnastics and is named after Natalia Yurchenko, who first performed it in 1982.

== Background and history ==
The Yurchenko vault family is named after Natalia Vladimirovna Yurchenko, a gymnast who trained under Vladislav Rastorotski. The pair designed a new way of moving onto the vaulting horse. They first tested the new approach by using a foam pit, and then introduced the move to the runway and vault horse. In 1982, she performed the vault for the first time at a competition in Moscow. The move's popularity grew after Elena Shushunova won the gold medal at the 1985 World Championships with the full-twisting Yurchenko vault.

The vault gained popularity quickly with the introduction of the new vault table in 2001 because of a decreased risk of injury. During the 2009 World Championships, all participating females included at least one Yurchenko vault. Yurchenko is now the most commonly mentioned name in gymnastics competitions.

== Technique ==
The Yurchenko vault has seven steps: the run, the hurdle, the takeoff, pre-flight, the block, post-flight, and the landing.

=== The run ===
The gymnast begins the vault by running down an 82 foot-long runway, because gaining speed and maintaining control are necessary to create the energy and momentum used throughout the rest of the vault.

=== The hurdle and the roundoff ===
At the end of the run, the gymnast performs a low skipping motion called the hurdle to begin the roundoff. The roundoff, a quick cartwheel, is then performed onto the springboard with the gymnast's hands placed just before the springboard and their feet on the springboard itself. The roundoff is the portion of the movement that distinguishes the move as belonging to the Yurchenko family of vaults. Other vault families include the Tsukahara, which consists of a different entry onto the table.

=== The takeoff ===
After the roundoff, the gymnast leaves the springboard and is propelled upwards. In a Yurchenko style vault the gymnast will leave the springboard with their back to the vault in a tight upper arch position.

=== Pre-flight ===
During the pre-flight the gymnast moves in a backwards rotation shifting the center of motion upward performing a back handspring onto the vault. The gymnast attempts to hold a straight bodyline position until they reach a near handstand position on the vault.

=== The block ===
The block defines the transition from pre-flight to post-flight. The gymnast makes contact with the vault with straight arms and uses their shoulders as springs to enter the air and obtain adequate height. All horizontal momentum is now vertical momentum.

=== Post-flight ===
Post flight time is determined by the vertical velocity of the gymnast as they leave the block and the center of motion moves upward. The post flight is characterized by the variation that the gymnast performs. For instance, the Amanar post-flight consists of two and a half twisting flips.

=== The landing ===
The gymnast aims to land completely vertical and perpendicular to the ground to prevent unwanted steps which would result in a loss of points. The body is fully extended with the knees slightly flexed in order to absorb forces as ground contact is made and the arms extended straight forward.

== Variations ==
Any vault with a round-off–back-handspring entry is classified as a "Yurchenko-style" vault in the Code of Points. Many variations of the original vault have been introduced by gymnasts in international competitions. Even as of 2019, gymnasts and coaches continue to develop more difficult versions of the Yurchenko.

Back handspring entry (off the table):

- Dungelova: Round-off, back-handspring entry tucked salto backwards with 2/1 turn (720°) off
- 1 1/2-twisting Yurchenko: Round-off, back-handspring entry–1 1/2-twisting layout. Abbreviated as 1.5Y.
- Baitova (more commonly called Double-twisting Yurchenko): Round-off, back-handspring entry–double-twisting layout. Abbreviated as DTY.
- Amanar/Shewfelt (2 1/2-twisting Yurchenko): Round-off, back-handspring entry–2 1/2-twisting layout. Abbreviated as 2.5Y.
- Shirai/Shirai-Kim (more commonly called Triple-twisting Yurchenko): Round-off, back-handspring entry–triple-twisting layout. Abbreviated as TTY.
- Shirai 2 (3 1/2-twisting Yurchenko): Round-off, back-handspring entry–3 1/2-twisting layout. Abbreviated as 3.5Y.
- Biles II: Round-off, back-handspring, double piked salto backwards

Twisting entry (springboard to table):

- Luconi: Round-off, back-handspring with 3/4 turn entry–back tuck/pike/layout somersault
- Omelianchik: Round-off, back-handspring with 1/2 turn entry–piked salto fwd off
- Ivantcheva: Round-off, back-handspring with 1/2 turn entry–tucked salto fwd off
- Servente: Round-off, back-handspring with 1/2 turn entry–tucked salto fwd with 1/2 turn (180°) off
- Podkopayeva: Round-off, back-handspring with 1/2 turn entry–front pike somersault with 1/2 twist
- López: Round-off, back-handspring with 1/2 turn entry–front layout somersault with 1/2 twist
- Khorkina: Round-off, back-handspring with 1/2 turn entry–front tuck somersault with 1 1/2 twist
- Mustafina: Round-off, back-handspring with 1/2 turn entry–front stretched somersault with 1 full twist
- Cheng: Round-off, back-handspring with 1/2 turn entry–front stretched somersault with 1 1/2 twist
- Biles: Round-off, back-handspring with 1/2 turn entry–front stretched somersault with 2 twists

== Scoring ==
Yurchenko vaults follow the same scoring assessment as other gymnastics categories. The gymnast is judged by a final F-score, which is the sum of the D-score and E-score. The D-score correlates to the difficulty of the move and the E-score correlates to the execution of the move. Yurchenko vaults are typically awarded higher D-scores due to the difficulty of their characteristic round-off entry with a half turn in the first phase of flight. D-scores are also influenced by the degrees of rotation around the transversal and longitudinal axes of motion during the second phase of flight, which means that the different variations have different D-scores. The Yurchenko double pike, Simone Biles being the first woman to perform this vault, has the highest D-score of any Yurchenko variation. The move consists of two flips in the pike position where the legs are extended straight and the body is folded forward at the waist. The vault group in the Code of Points is officially called "Round off with or without 1/2 to 1/1 turn (180-360 degrees) in entry phase (Yurchenko entry) - Salto forward or backward with or without long axis turn in second flight phase".

== Gallery ==
Execution of a Yurchenko vault

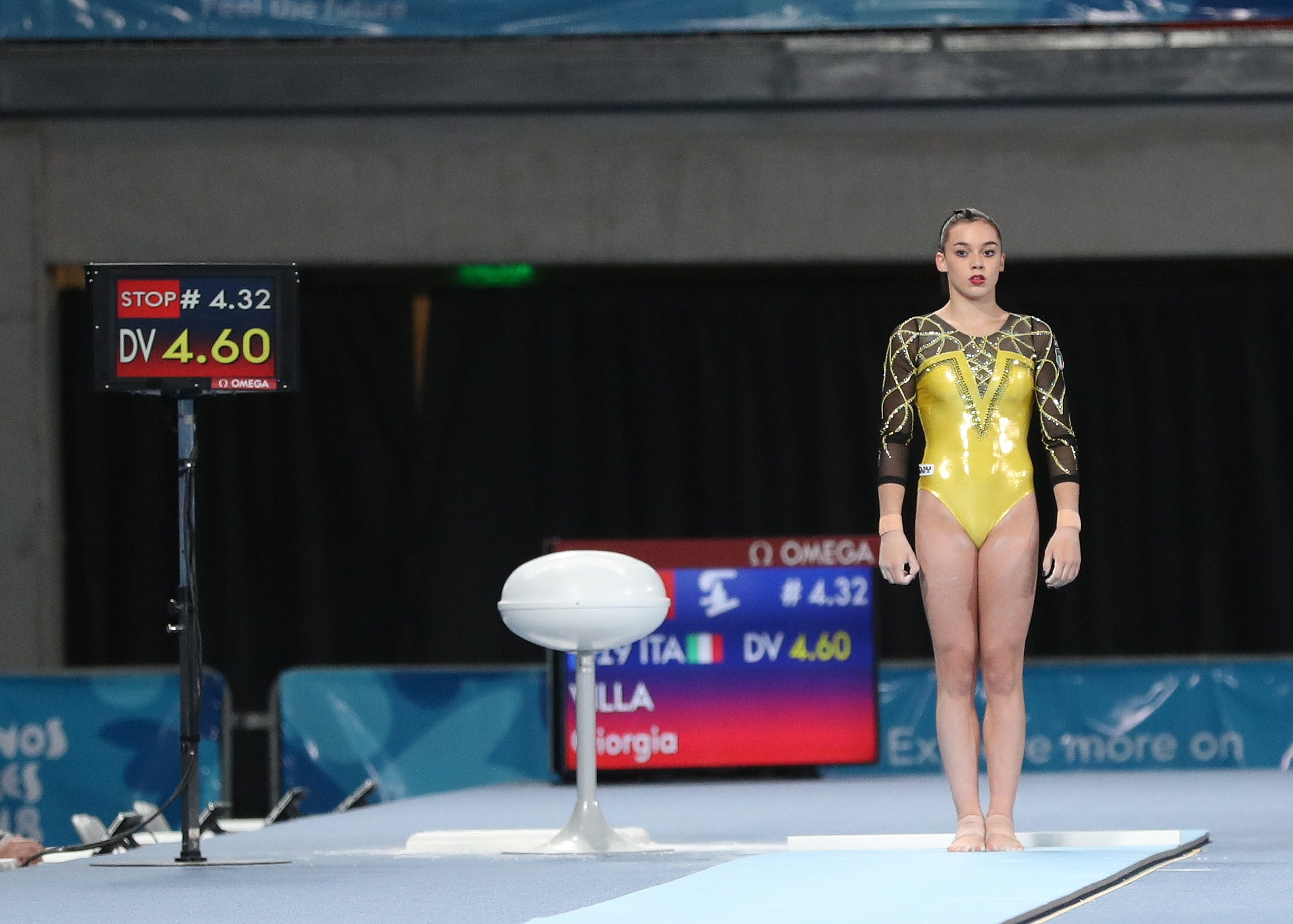
Performed by Giorgia Villa at the 2018 Youth Olympics

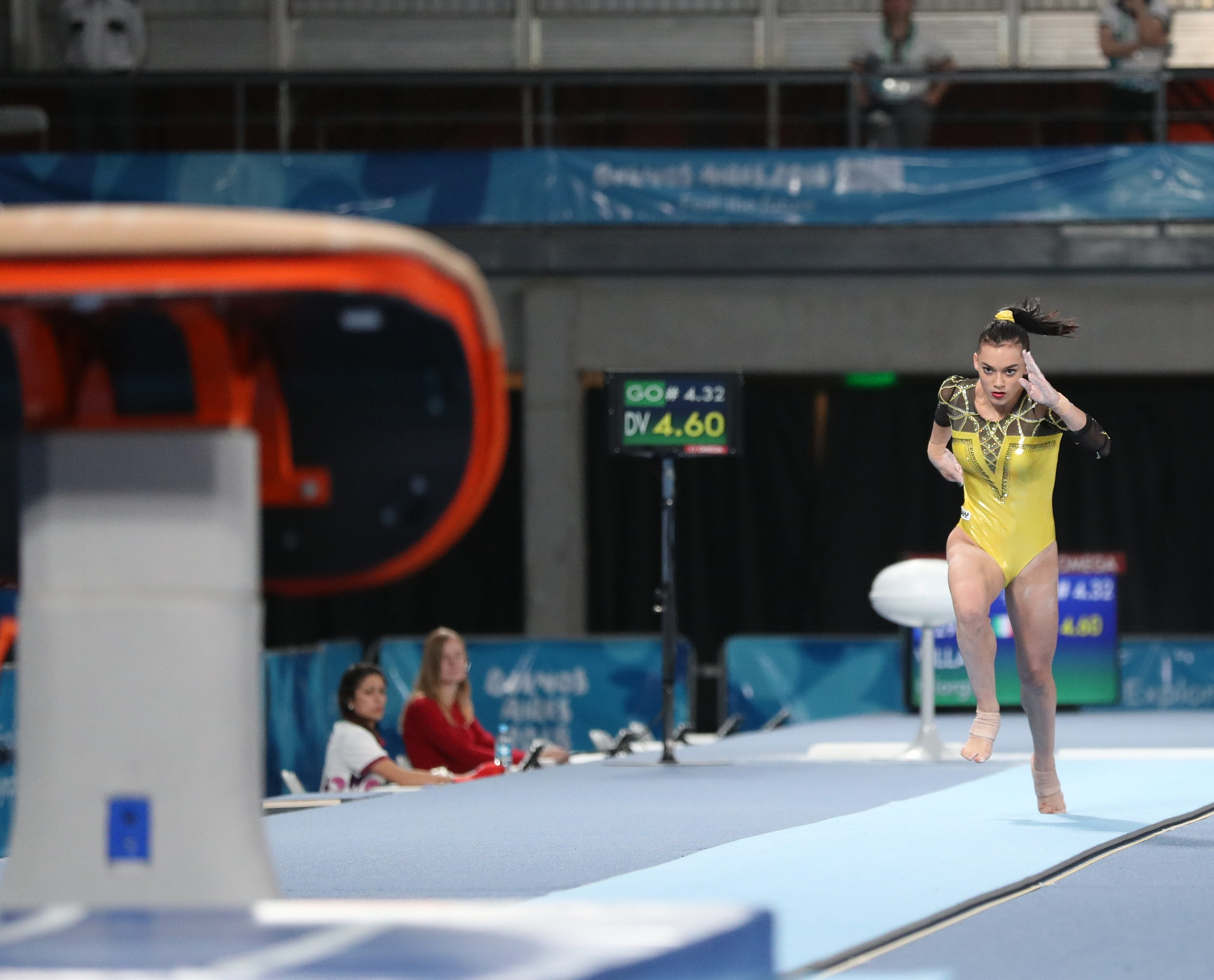
Performed by Giorgia Villa at the 2018 Youth Olympics

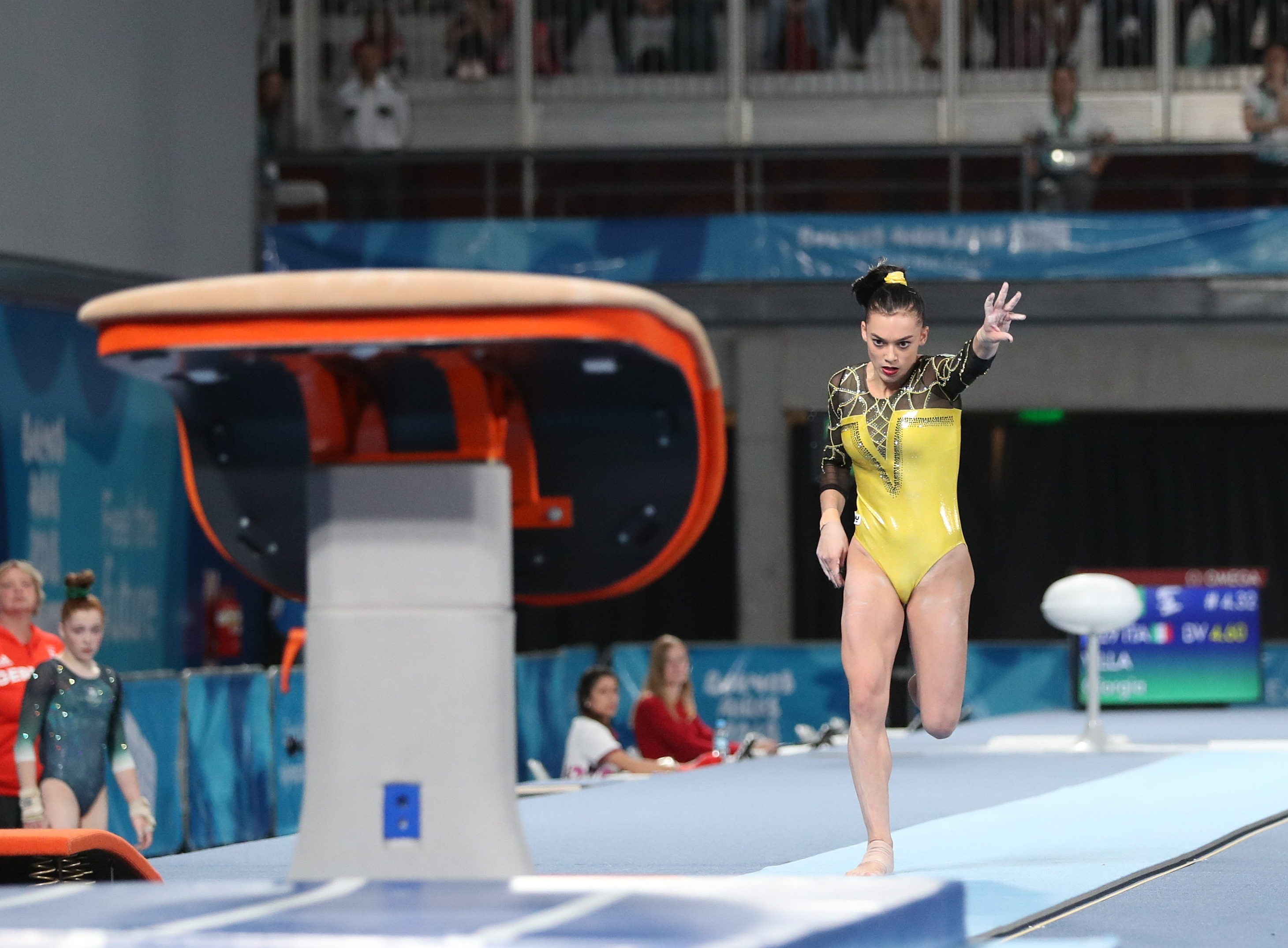
Performed by Giorgia Villa at the 2018 Youth Olympics

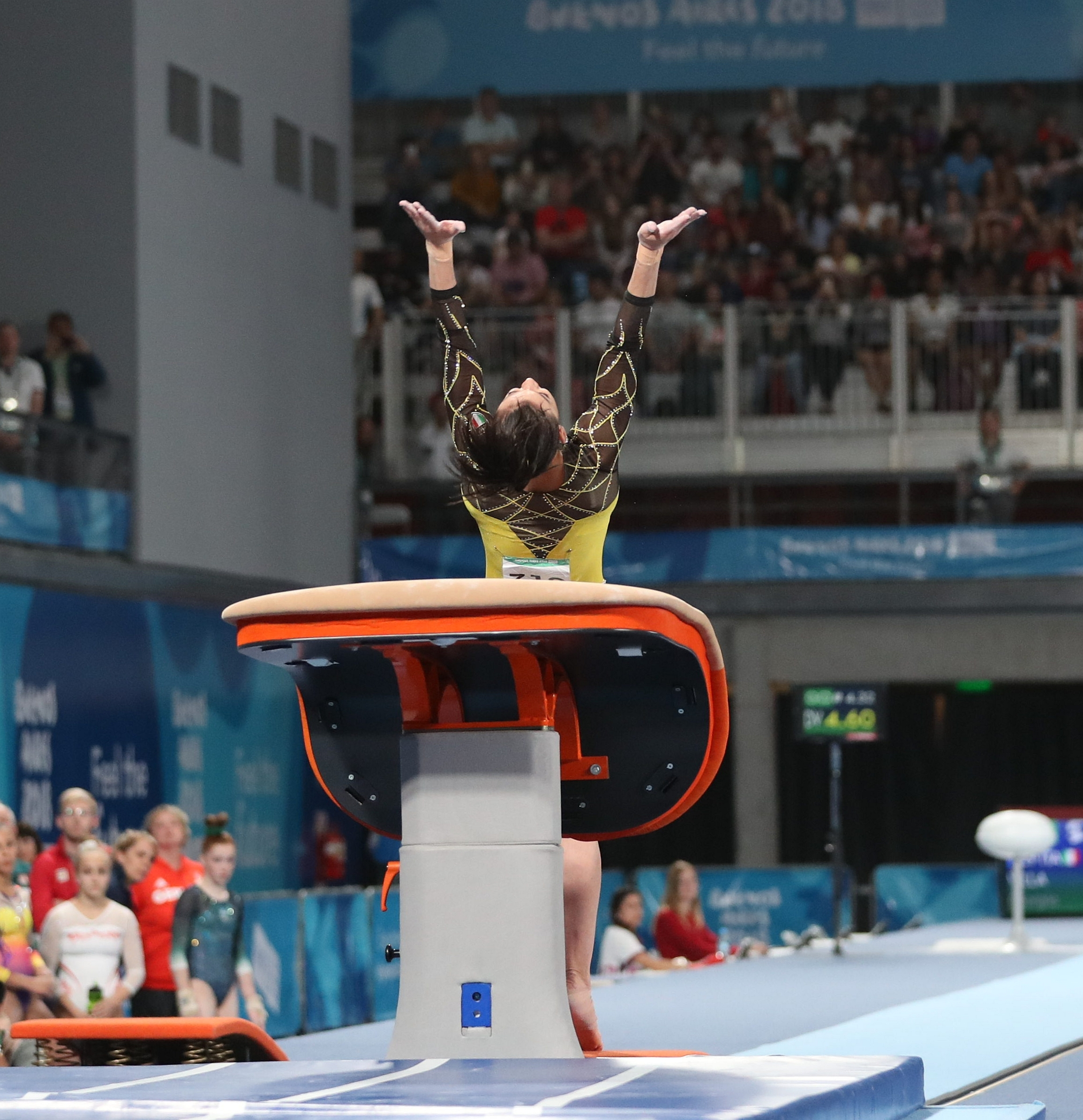
Performed by Giorgia Villa at the 2018 Youth Olympics

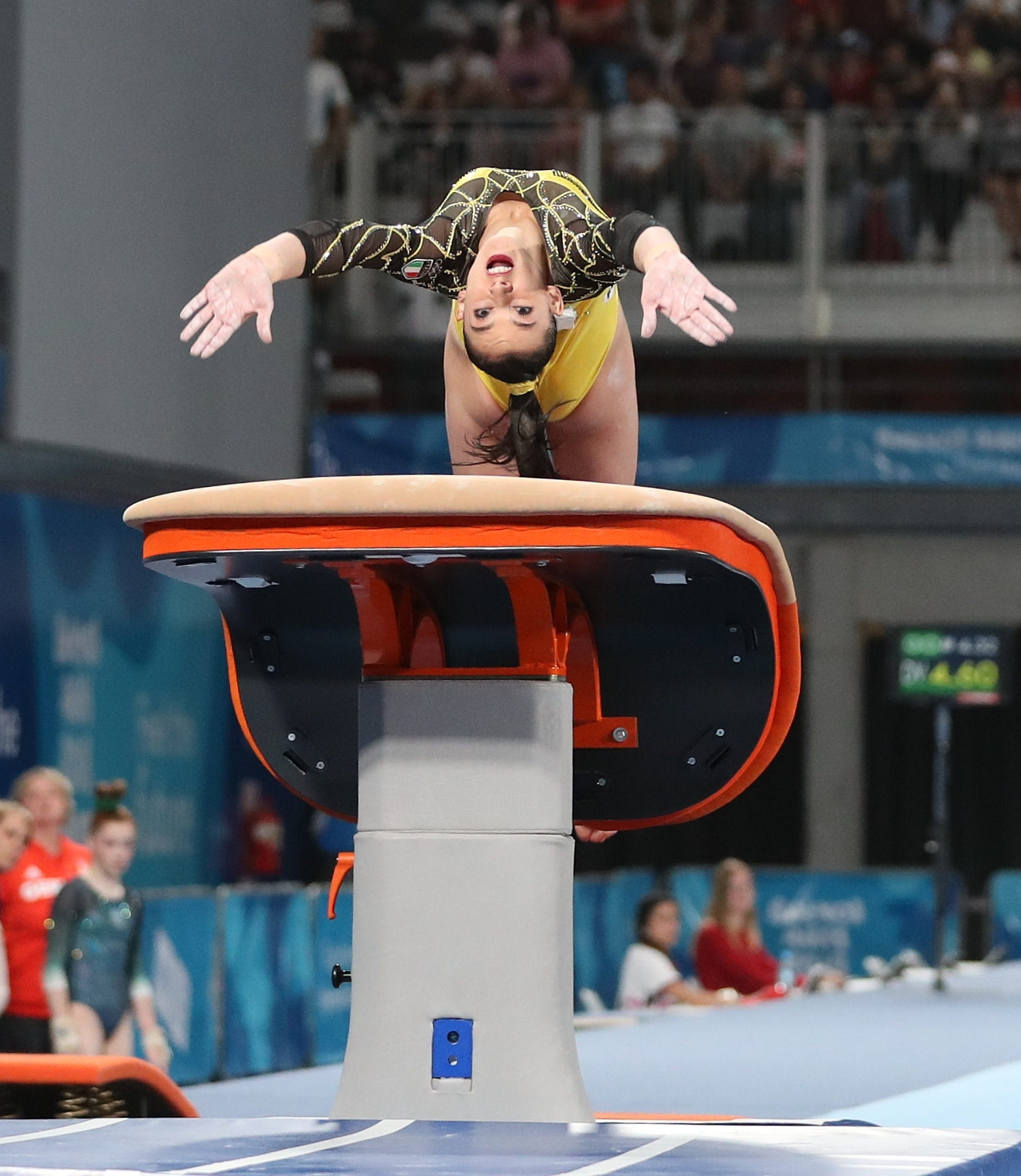
Performed by Giorgia Villa at the 2018 Youth Olympics

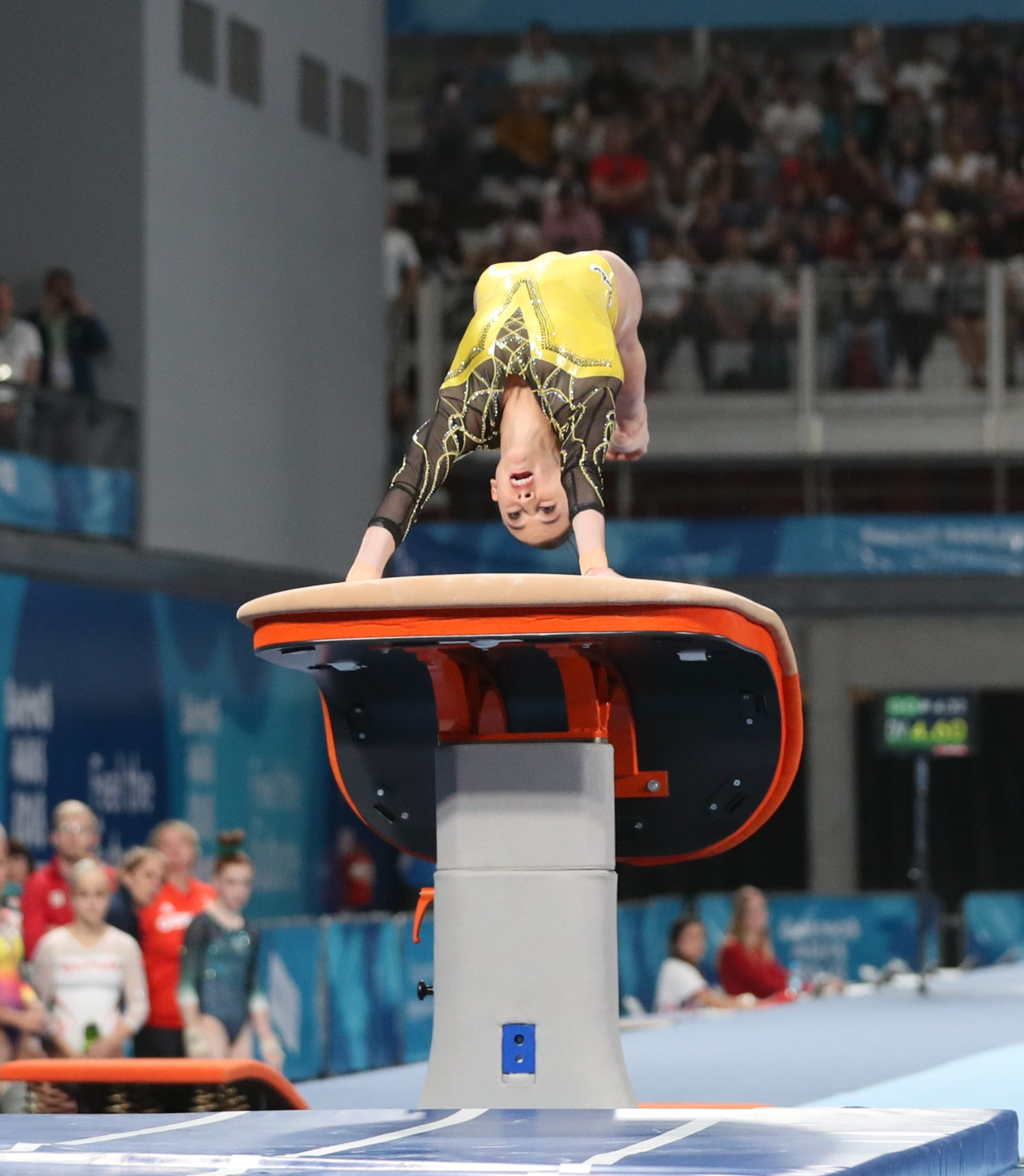
Performed by Giorgia Villa at the 2018 Youth Olympics

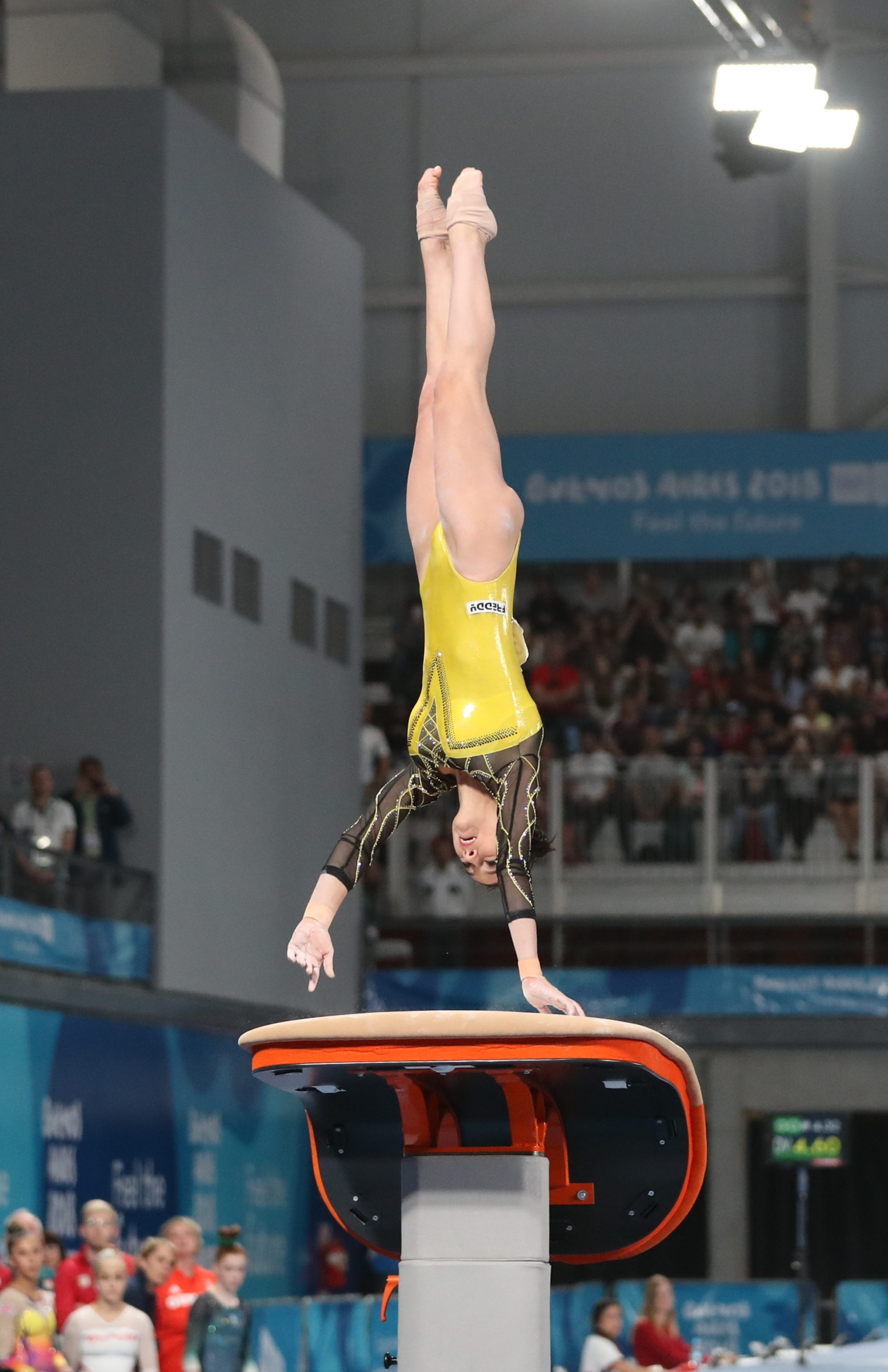
Performed by Giorgia Villa at the 2018 Youth Olympics

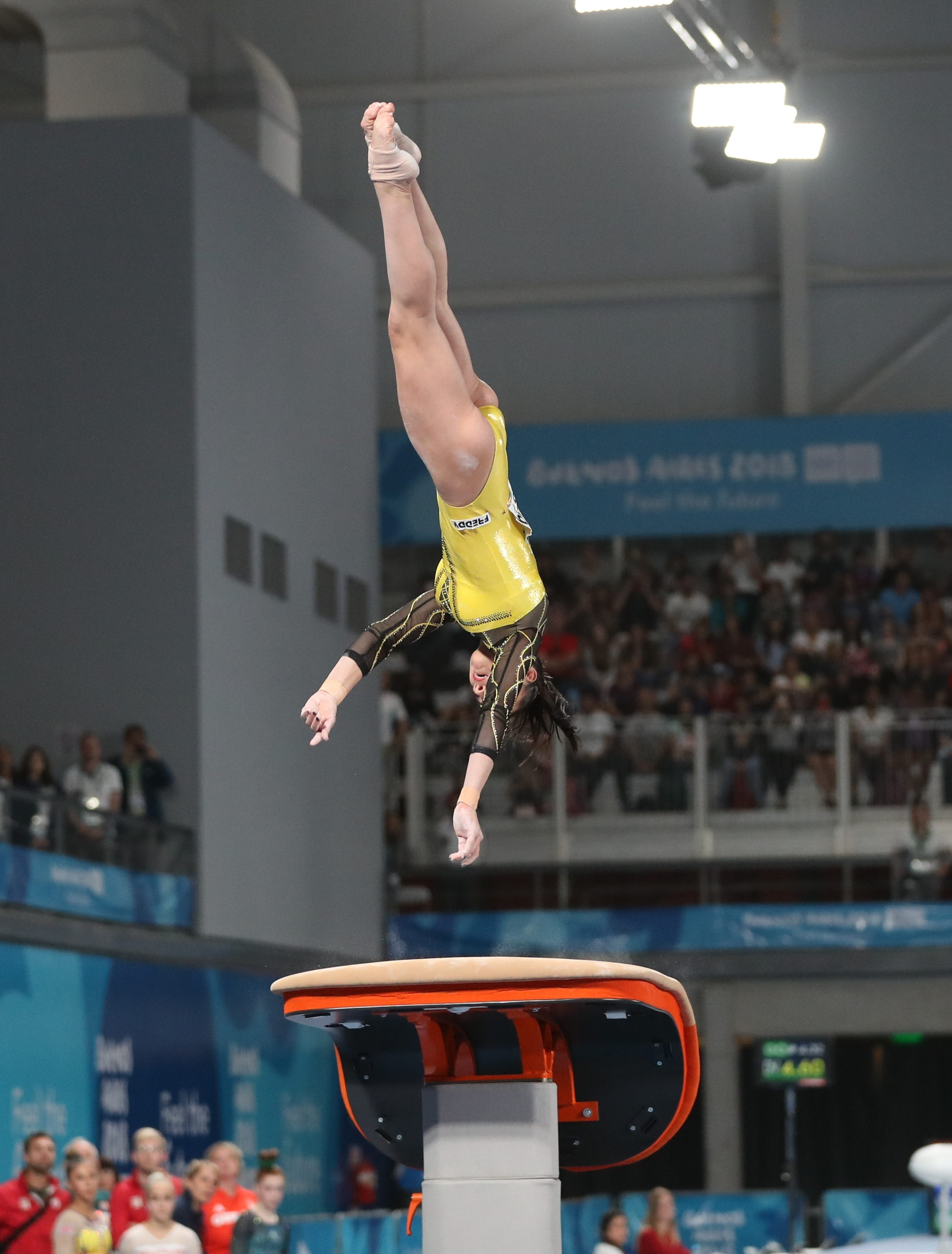
Performed by Giorgia Villa at the 2018 Youth Olympics

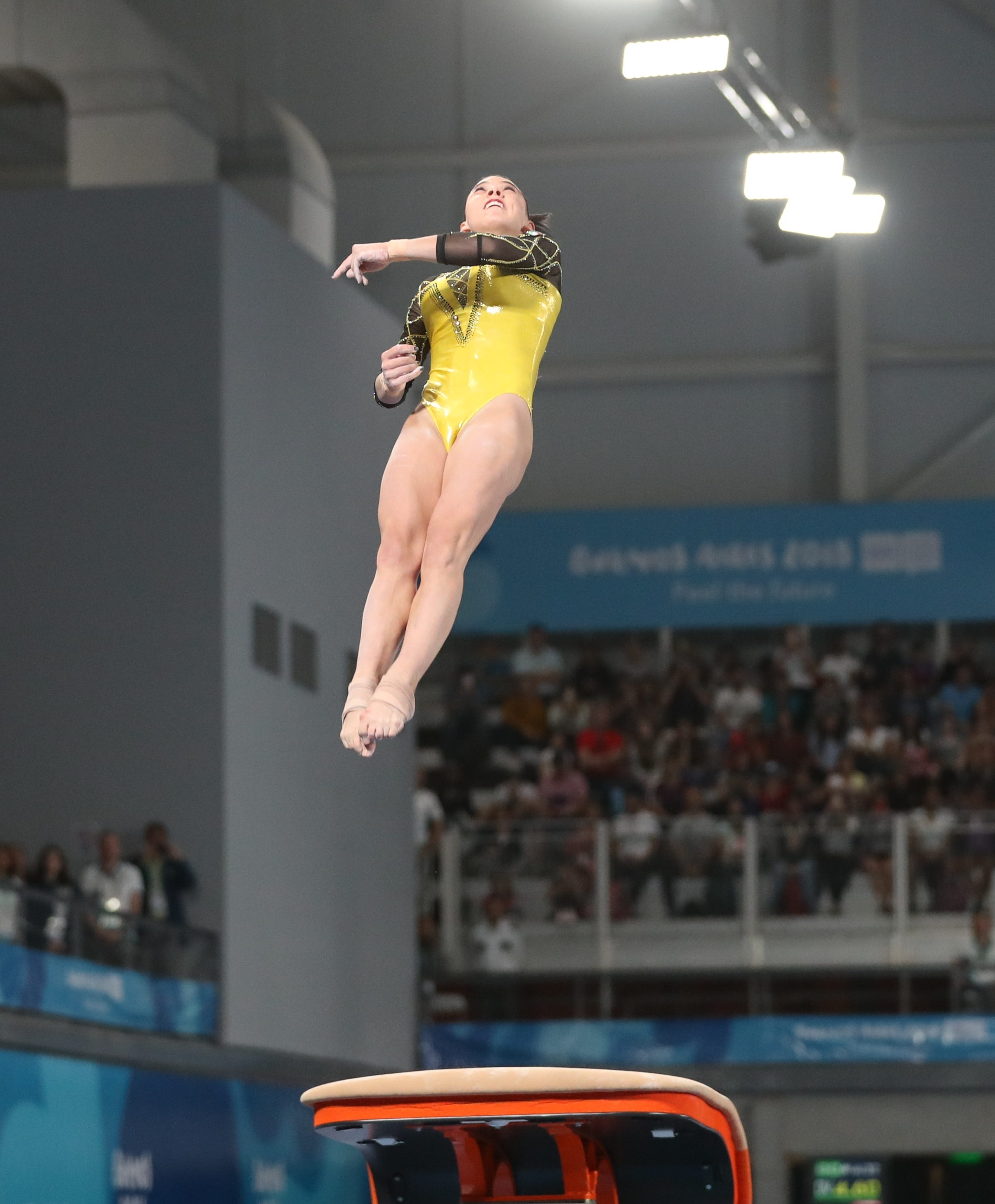
Performed by Giorgia Villa at the 2018 Youth Olympics

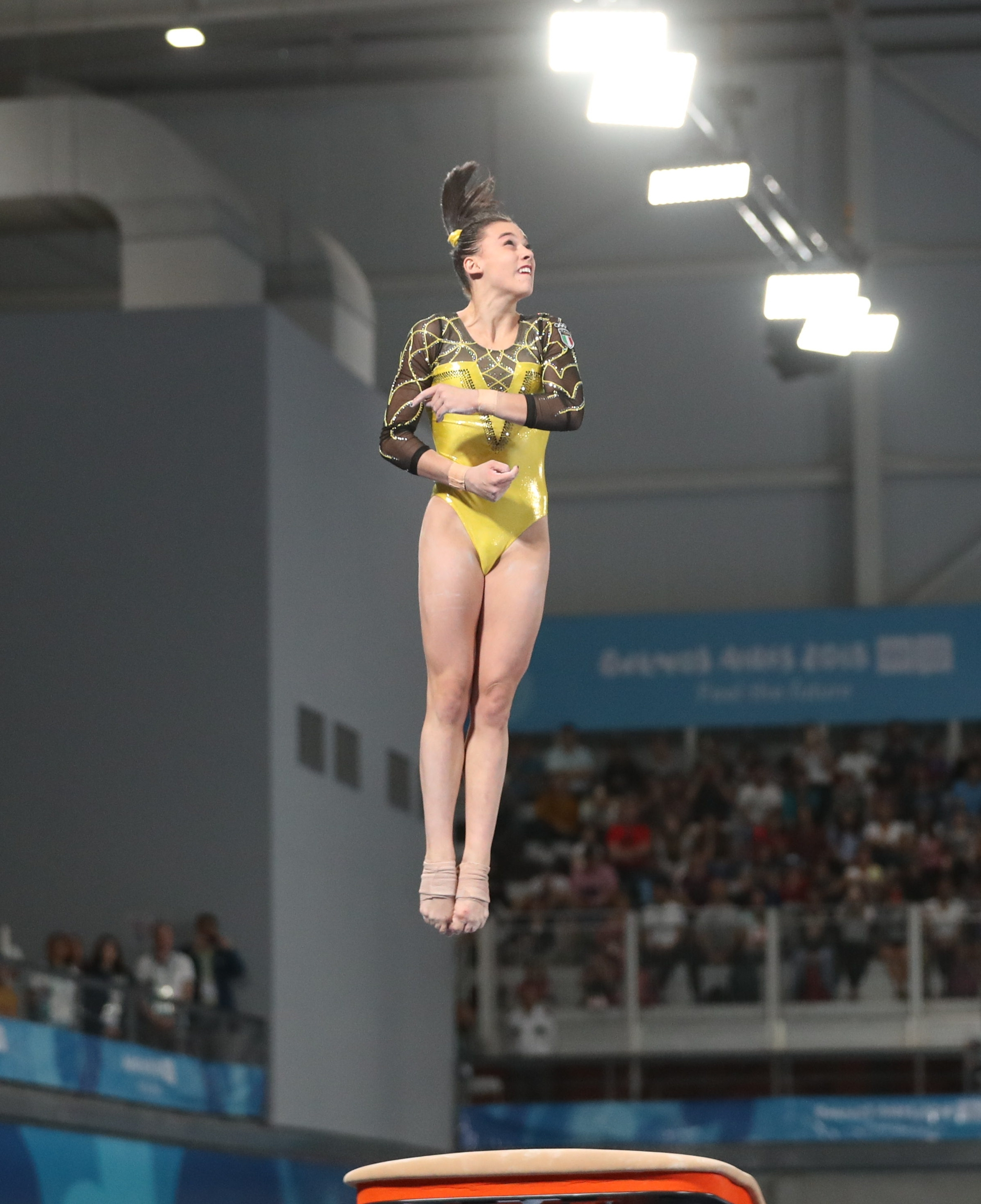
Performed by Giorgia Villa at the 2018 Youth Olympics

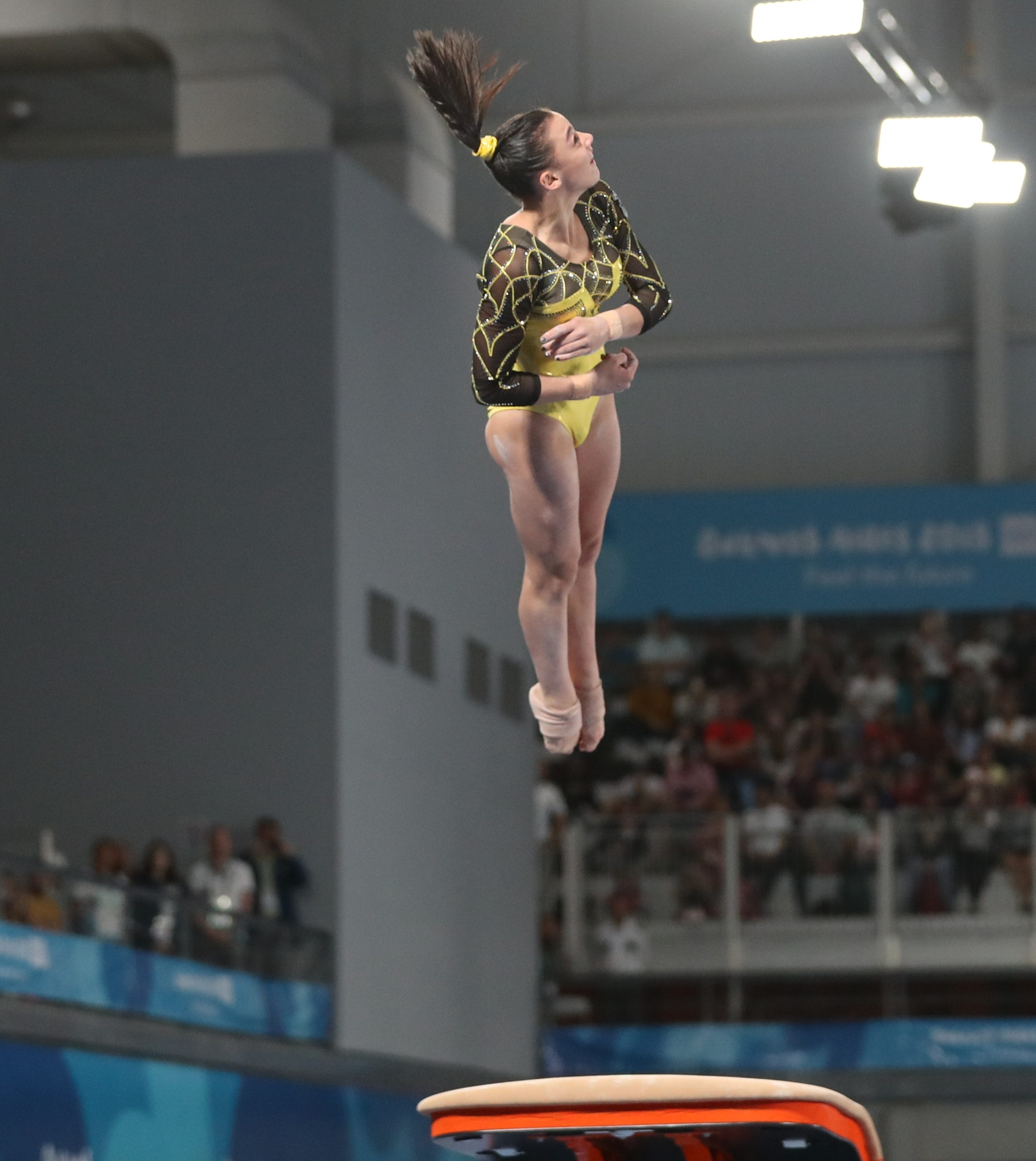
Performed by Giorgia Villa at the 2018 Youth Olympics

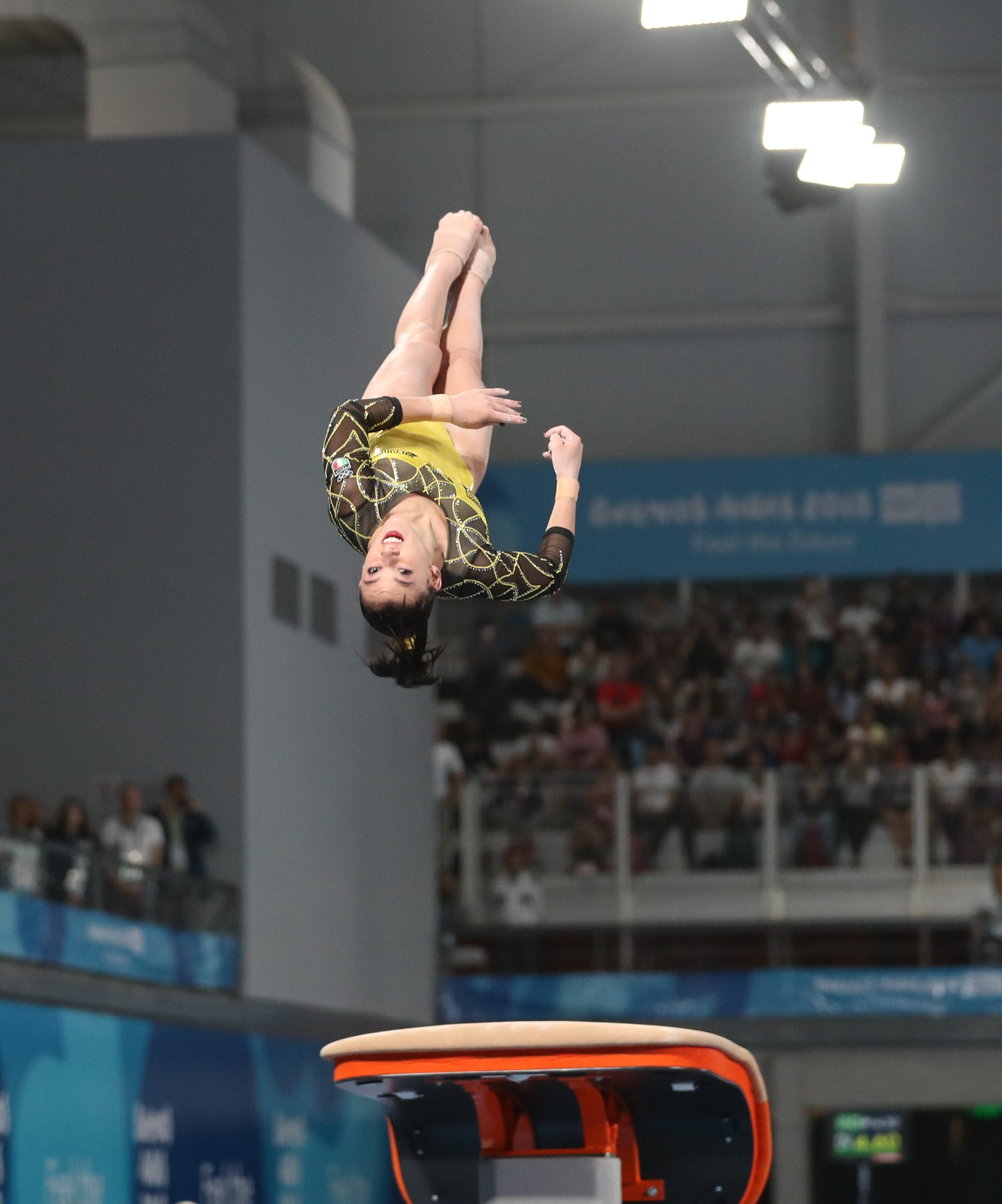
Performed by Giorgia Villa at the 2018 Youth Olympics

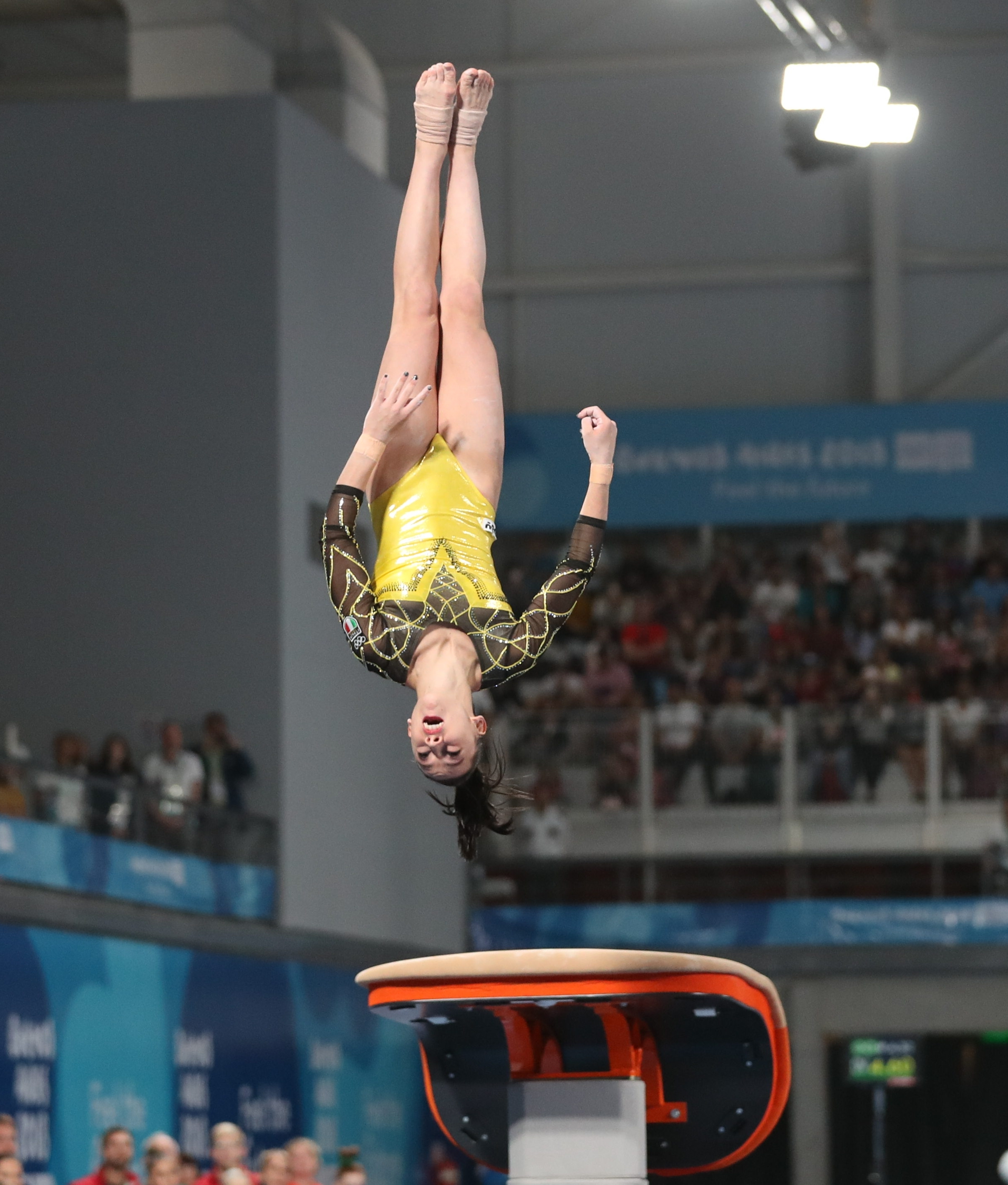
Performed by Giorgia Villa at the 2018 Youth Olympics

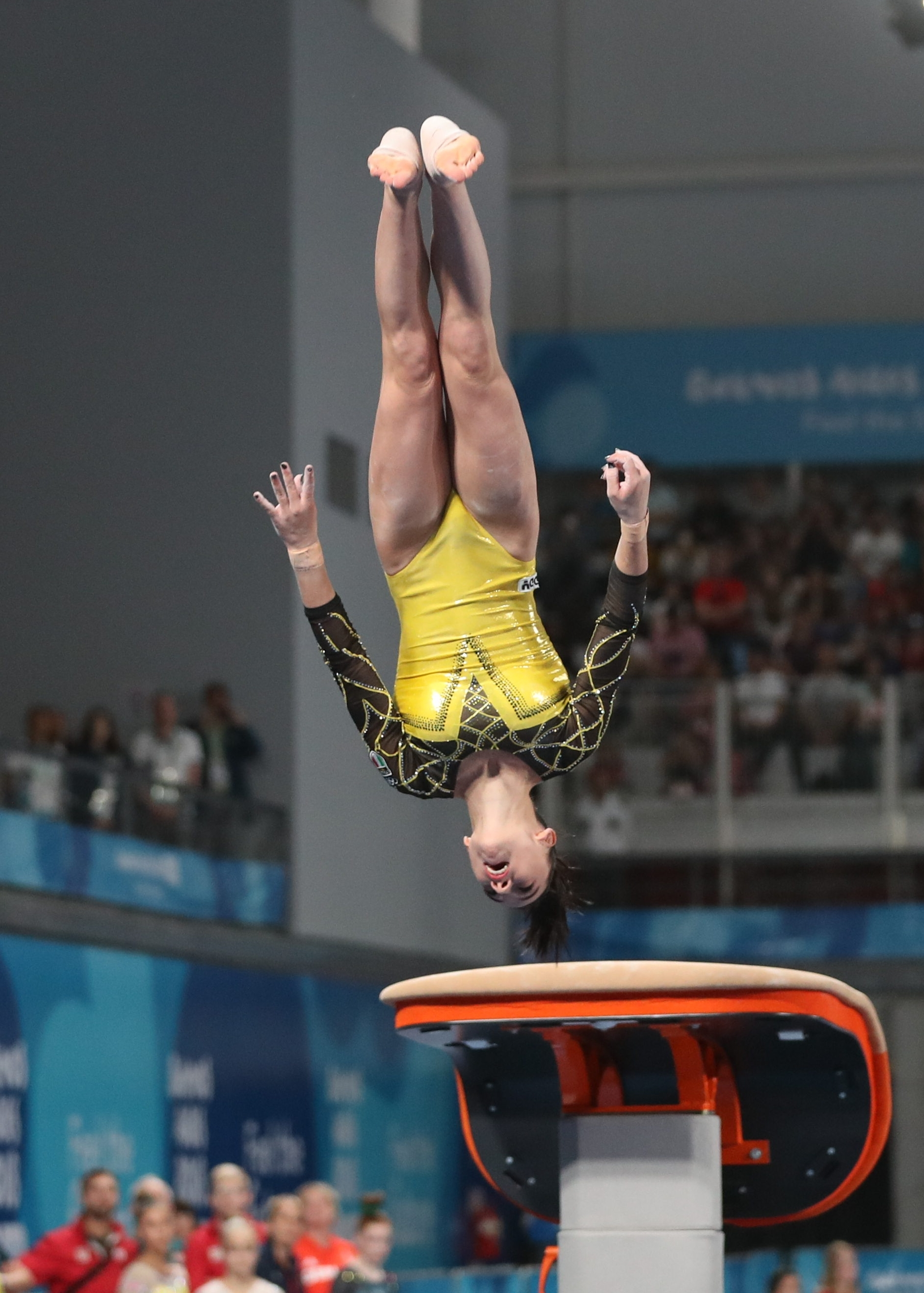
Performed by Giorgia Villa at the 2018 Youth Olympics

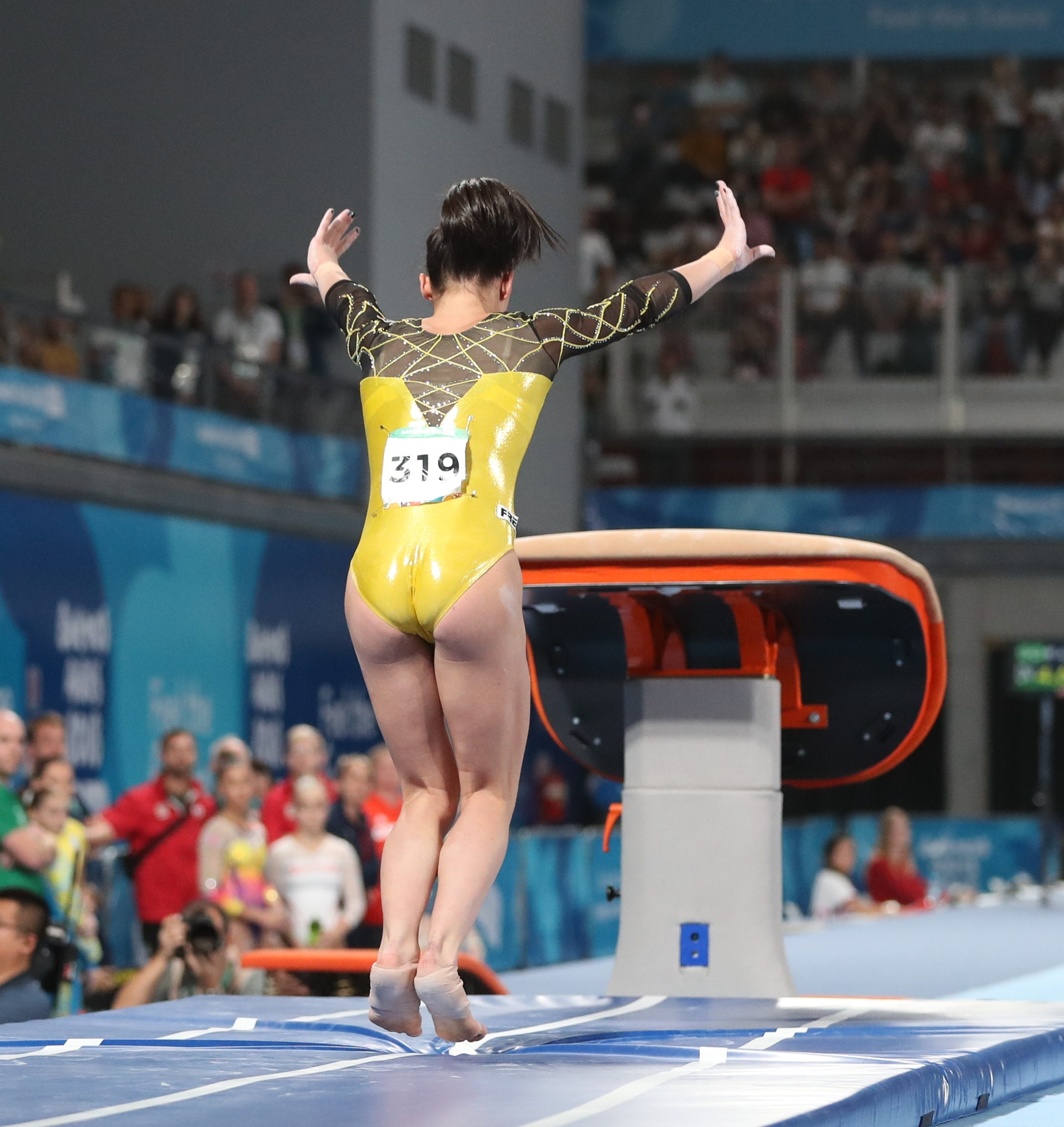
Performed by Giorgia Villa at the 2018 Youth Olympics

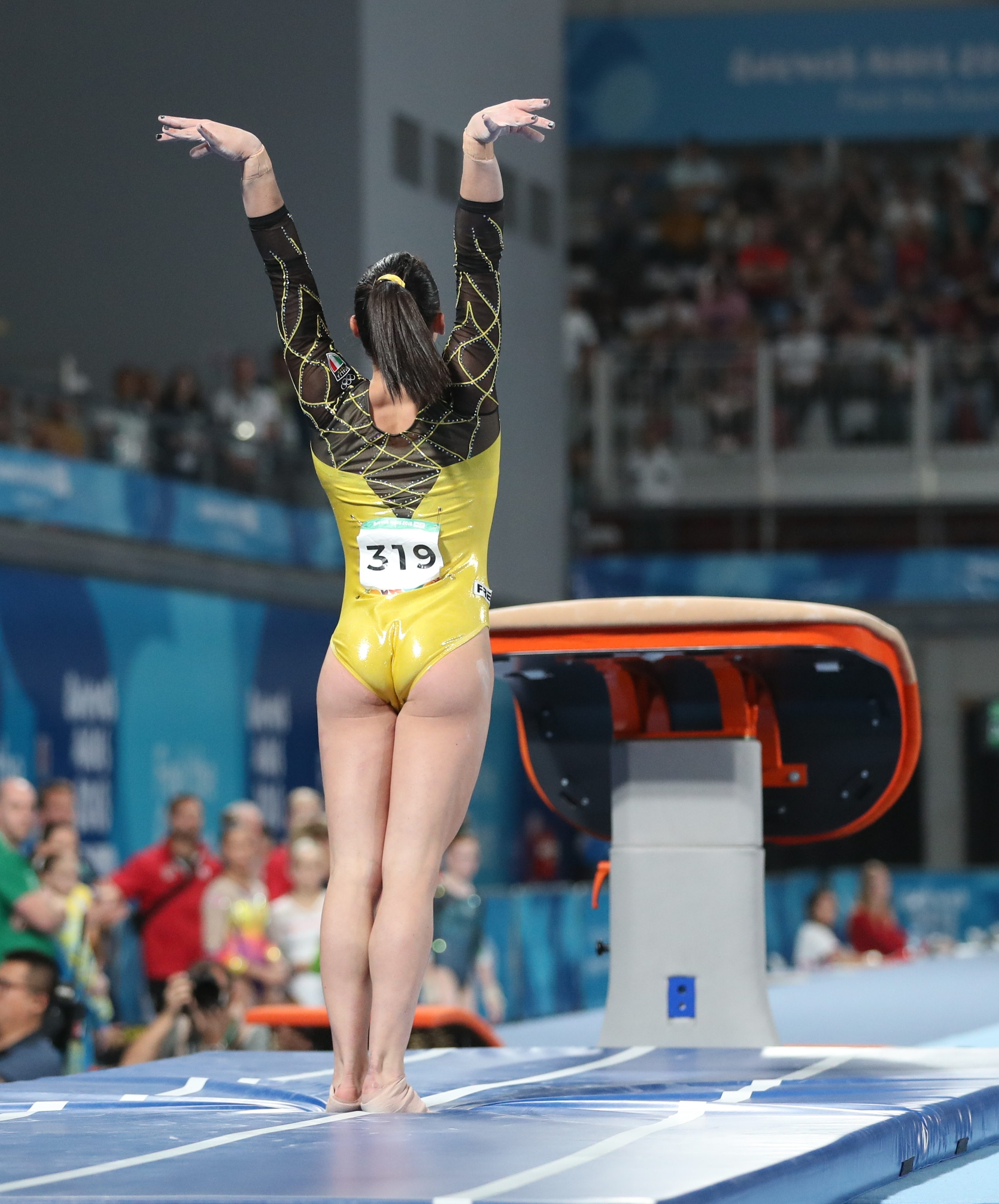
Performed by Giorgia Villa at the 2018 Youth Olympics

== See also ==
- Yurchenko loop
- Julissa Gomez
- Produnova
- Simone Biles
