= Code of Points (gymnastics) =

Rulebook that defines the scoring system in artistic gymnastics

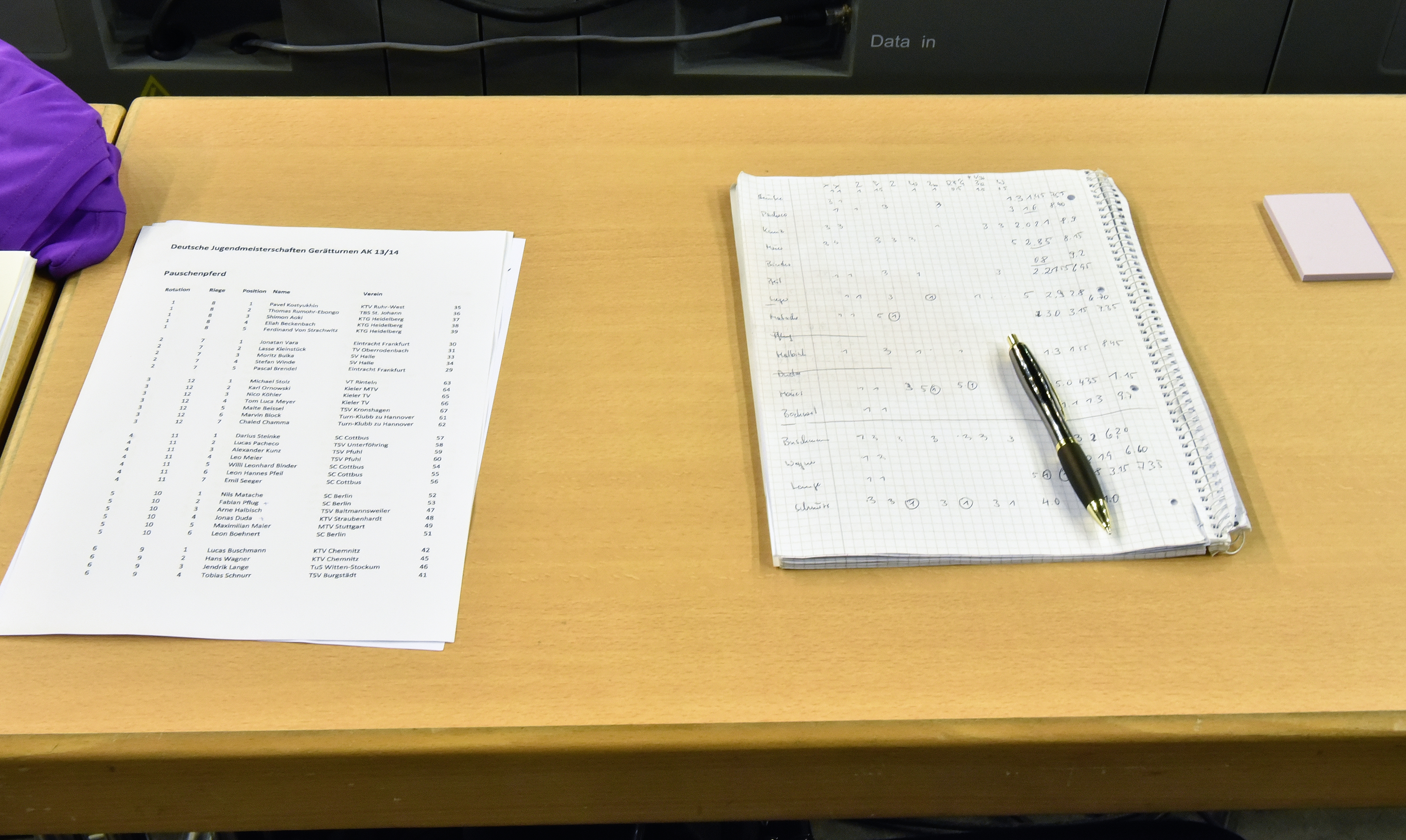
Deductions of a judge during an artistic gymnastics competition

The Code of Points is a rulebook that defines the scoring system for each level of competition in gymnastics. There is not a universal international Code of Points, and every oversight organization — such as World Gymnastics (formerly the International Gymnastics Federation or FIG), NCAA Gymnastics, and most national gymnastics federations — designs and employs its own different Code of Points.

== The FIG Code of Points ==
The FIG Code of Points is defined in a public document provided by the Federation. Gymnasts competing at lower levels or outside the FIG's jurisdiction (e.g., NCAA gymnastics and local club teams) may not be scored according to the FIG code.

=== 2006 Revised Code ===
In 2006, the Code of Points and the entire gymnastics scoring system were overhauled, two years after the judging controversy at 2004 Olympics in Athens brought the reliability and objectivity of the scoring system into question and amid arguments that execution had been sacrificed for difficulty in artistic gymnastics. It followed a similarly radical scoring change in figure skating also prompted by irregularities in judging at major events.

Proponents of the new system said it was necessary to advance gymnastics, promote difficult skills, and increase judging objectivity. Opponents argued that the new system would reduce fan interest in gymnastics and would change the sport's essence by de-emphasizing artistry. They also argued that because each competitor begins with a start value based on their routine's difficulty, those with lower start values are essentially eliminated before they perform. Some have denounced the fact that the new Code effectively abolishes the "perfect 10" score, for many years one of the hallmarks of gymnastics, and that it favors extreme difficulty over form, execution, and consistency. At the 2006 World Championships, for instance, Vanessa Ferrari of Italy was able to controversially win the women's all-around title despite a fall on the balance beam, in part by picking up extra points from performing more high-difficulty skills on floor exercise. The 2006 report of the FIG's Athletes' Commission, drafted after a review and discussion of the year's events noted several areas of concern including numerous inconsistencies in judging and evaluation of skills and routines.

==== Table of elements ====
The Table of Elements is the section of the Code of Points used to identify, classify and assign value to gymnastics elements. Every acrobatic and dance skill is listed, illustrated and assigned a difficulty rating. For all apparatus except vault, difficulty ratings for both the women's and men's elements range from A (easiest) to J (most difficult). Difficulty ratings are valued as follows: A (.10), B (.20), C (.30), D (.40), E (.50), F (.60), G (.70), H (.80), I (.90), and J (1.0). The values are used to tabulate the gymnast's score. Each vault is assigned a difficulty value ranging from 2.0 (easiest) to 6.4 (most difficult). The Table of Elements did not undergo major changes in the 2006 Code overhaul.

As other aspects of the Code, the Table of Elements is frequently re-evaluated. Skills listed in the Table may have their difficulty ratings raised or lowered after evaluation by the FIG Technical Committee. In addition, skills that are determined to be too dangerous to the athletes may be banned outright, for example roll-out skills like the Thomas Salto. The Technical Committee may also give specific hazardous skills artificially low difficulty ratings to deter gymnasts from trying to compete them, such as the Biles on balance beam and the Produnova on women's vault.

Many of the skills in the Table of Elements are named after gymnasts. An original element is named after an athlete when he or she is the first person to successfully perform it at an official FIG event, such as a World Championships, an Olympics, or a FIG World Cup. Gymnasts and their coaches must submit their original skill to the FIG before the meet for evaluation and possible inclusion in the Table of Elements.

==== Judging and score tabulation ====
Two panels of judges evaluate each performance. One evaluates the difficulty and other evaluates execution. The final mark is the combined total of these two scores.

The D-score (or difficulty score) indicates the difficulty of the exercise on three criteria:

- Difficulty Value (DV): The difficulty value of a routine is the combined total of the eight elements with the highest value according to the Table of Elements. The dismount is included as one of the eight elements. Elements are rated from 0.10 to 1.0 according difficulty.
- Composition Requirements (CR): In the 2017 Code of Points, gymnasts must demonstrate skills from four required Element Groups on each apparatus. For each composition requirement completed, 0.5 points are awarded. The maximum CR score is 2.00. From 2008 to 2016, there were five different Element Groups for each apparatus, allowing a gymnast to earn up to 2.5 points.
- Connection Value (CV): Gymnasts can earn extra points by connecting two or more elements. The number of points awarded is determined by the rating of the elements performed in combination.

The D-score judging panel does not take deductions. However, they may decide not to award points for elements that are performed incorrectly or not completed. They may also decide not to award connection value points if there are extra steps or pauses between skills that are meant to be connected.

There is no upper limit on the D-score.

The E-score (or execution score) evaluates the execution and artistry of the routine.

- The base score is 10.0 for all routines. The E-score judging panel deducts points for errors in form, artistry, execution, technique and routine composition. Errors are judged to be small, medium or large and respective 0.1, 0.3 and 0.5 deductions are applied. There is a 1.0 deduction for falling.

The D-score and E-score are added together for the gymnast's final mark.

Scoring for vault is somewhat different:

- Every vault is assigned a points value. The D-score is simply this value. Every gymnast performing the same vault will receive the same D-score.
- The E-score starts at 10.0. Judges deduct for form, technique, execution and landing.

As with other apparatus, the D-score and E-score are added together for the gymnast's final mark.

There are several acts that completely invalidate the vault and result in a score of 0. These include receiving spotting (assistance) from a coach, going before the signal and not using the U-shaped safety mat for Yurchenko-style vaults.

An inquiry into a gymnast's score can be initiated if it was felt that the score was too low. Only the D-score can be contested, however.

=== Pre-2006 Code ===
Skills: Every acrobatic and dance element was awarded a specific difficulty rating, ranging from A (easiest) to “Super E” (hardest) in the Table of Elements. A gymnast earned bonus points by performing difficult skills alone or in combination.

Required elements: Routine composition was decided by the gymnast and his or her coaches, however, on every apparatus except vault there was a list of required elements (similar to the EGR in the new Code) that had to be performed during the routine. Examples of required elements included 360 degree turns on balance beam and a backwards salto (somersault) on floor exercise.

Base score: The base score was the default Start Value of the routine, provided the gymnast fulfilled all required elements. This changed over the years and tended to lower as the codes went on. For instance, for the 1992-1996 code, a base score of 9.4 was awarded if all of the basic elements were fulfilled. For the 1996-2000 code, the base score was a 9.0. Finally, a base score of 8.8 was awarded for the 2000-2004 Olympic years. Before the new code, the base score again dropped to an 8.6 but this was not adopted for a very long time (only 2005-2006).

Start Value: The Start Value (SV) of each routine was determined by adding the base score to the bonus points earned from performing difficult elements and combinations. Ideally, a gymnast wanted to have an SV as close to 10.0 as possible.

On vault, every vault was assigned a specific Start Value in the Code.

The score was determined by subtracting any deductions for poor form, execution, steps, falls or other infractions from the SV.

== See also ==
- Banned gymnastics skills
