= 2011 U.S. National Gymnastics Championships =

2011 Visa U.S. National Gymnastics Championships
- Venue: Xcel Energy Center
- Location: Saint Paul, Minnesota U.S.
- Date: August 17, 2011—August 20, 2011

The 2011 Visa U.S. National Gymnastics Championships was the 48th edition of the U.S. National Gymnastics Championships. The competition was held from August 17–20, 2011 at the Xcel Energy Center in Saint Paul, Minnesota.

== Event information ==
The forty-eighth edition of the Championships, the competition was held at the Xcel Energy Center in Saint Paul, Minnesota, a multi-purpose arena. The competition was televised by NBC Sports Network.

=== Competition schedule ===
The competition featured Senior and Junior competitions for both women's and men's disciplines. The competition was as follows;

Thursday, August 17
1 p.m. - Junior Men Competition - Day 1
6:30 p.m. - Senior Men's Competition - Day 1

Friday, August 18
1 p.m. - Junior Women's Competition - Day 1
6:30 p.m. - Senior Women's Competition - Day 1

Saturday, August 19
11:30 a.m. - Senior Men's Competition - Final Day
6 p.m. - Junior Men's Competition - Final Day

Sunday, August 20
10 a.m. - Junior Women's Competition - Final Day
2:30 p.m. - Senior Women's Competition - Final Day

Note: all times are in Central Time Zone.

=== Sponsorship ===
Visa was the title sponsor of the event as they had been since 2004.

== Medalists ==
Event	Gold	Silver	Bronze
Senior Women
Individual all-around	Jordyn Wieber	McKayla Maroney	Aly Raisman
Vault	McKayla Maroney	Alicia Sacramone	Brandie Jay
Uneven bars	Jordyn Wieber	Mackenzie Caquatto	Anna Li Gabby Douglas
Balance beam	Alicia Sacramone	Chellsie Memmel	Jordyn Wieber
Floor	Jordyn Wieber	Rebecca Bross	Aly Raisman
Junior Women
Individual all-around	Katelyn Ohashi	Kyla Ross	Sarah Finnegan
Vault	Lexie Priessman	MyKayla Skinner	Kyla Ross
Uneven bars	Katelyn Ohashi	Kyla Ross	Kennedy Baker
Balance beam	Katelyn Ohashi	Kyla Ross	Sarah Finnegan
Floor	Katelyn Ohashi	Lexie Priessman	Sarah Finnegan
Senior Men
Individual all-around	Danell Leyva	Jonathan Horton	John Orozco
Floor	Jacob Dalton	Steven Legendre	Jonathan Horton
Pommel horse	Alexander Naddour	Ty Echard	John Orozco
Rings	Brandon Wynn	C. J. Maestas	Jonathan Horton
Vault	Jacob Dalton	Steven Legendre	Jonathan Horton
Parallel bars	Danell Leyva	John Orozco	Chris Brooks
Horizontal bar	Danell Leyva	Chris Brooks	John Orozco Paul Ruggeri

== National team ==
The following seniors were named to the National Team – Rebecca Bross, Bridgette Caquatto, Mackenzie Caquatto, Gabby Douglas, Shawn Johnson, McKayla Maroney, Chellsie Memmel, Aly Raisman, Alicia Sacramone, Sabrina Vega, Jordyn Wieber. The following juniors were named to the National Team – Kennedy Baker, Brianna Brown, Madison Desch, Brenna Dowell, Sarah Finnegan, Amelia Hundley, Bailie Key, Katelyn Ohashi, Elizabeth Price, Lexie Priessman, Kyla Ross, MyKayla Skinner, Kiana Winston.

== Participants ==
The following individuals are participating in competition:

=== Senior ===
- Rebecca Bross – Plano, TX (WOGA)
- Bridgette Caquatto – Naperville, IL (Legacy Elite)
- Mackenzie Caquatto – Naperville, IL (Legacy Elite)
- Jessie DeZiel – Rogers, MN (Twin City Twisters)
- Gabby Douglas – Virginia Beach, VA (Chow's)
- Jessica Howe – Plano, TX (WOGA)
- Brandie Jay – Fort Collins, CO (GK Gymnastics)
- Amanda Jetter – Milford, OH (Cincinnati Gymnastics)
- Shawn Johnson – West Des Moines, IA (Chow's)
- Sophia Lee – Plano, TX (WOGA)
- Anna Li – Aurora, IL (Legacy Elite)
- Casey Magee – Eugene, OR (Capital Gymnastics)
- McKayla Maroney – Laguna Niguel, CA (All Olympia)
- Grace McLaughlin – Allen, TX (WOGA)
- Chellsie Memmel – West Allis, WI (M and M Gymnastics)
- Hallie Mossett – Los Angeles, CA (West Coast Elite)
- Aly Raisman – Needham, MA (Brestyan's)
- Alicia Sacramone – Winchester, MA (Brestyan's)
- Bridget Sloan – Pittsboro, IN (Sharp's Gymnastics)
- Sabrina Vega – Carmel, NY (Dynamic Gymnastics)
- Jordyn Wieber – DeWitt, MI (Gedderts' Twistars)
- McKenzie Wofford – McKinney, TX (Zenith Elite)

=== Junior ===
- Kennedy Baker – Flower Mound, TX (Texas Dreams)
- Simone Biles – Spring, TX (Bannon's Gymnastix)
- Mackenzie Brannan – Austin, TX (Capital Gymnastics)
- Brianna Brown – West Chester, OH (Cincinnati Gymnastics)
- Madison Desch – Lenexa, KS (GAGE)
- Brenna Dowell – Odessa, MO (GAGE)
- Peyton Ernst – Coppell, TX (Texas Dreams)
- Ericha Fassbender – Katy, TX (Stars Gymnastics)
- Sarah Finnegan – St. Louis, MO (GAGE)
- Ariana Guerra – League City, TX (Stars Gymnastics)
- Veronica Hults – Allen, TX (Texas Dreams)
- Amelia Hundley – Hamilton, OH (Cincinnati Gymnastics)
- Bailie Key – Coppell, TX (Texas Dreams)
- Madison Kocian – Dallas, TX (WOGA)
- Lauren Marinez – Orlando, FL (Orlando Metro)
- Mary Maxwell – Elk Grove, CA (Texas Dreams)
- Abigail Milliet – Denton, TX (Denton Gymnastics)
- Maggie Nichols – Little Canada, MN (Twin City Twisters)
- Katelyn Ohashi – Plano, TX (WOGA)
- Samantha Partyka – Katy, TX (Champions Gymnastics)
- Elizabeth Price – Coopersburg, PA (Parkettes)
- Lexie Priessman – Cincinnati, OH (Cincinnati Gymnastics)
- Kyla Ross – Aliso Viejo, CA (Gym-Max Gymnastics)
- Polina Shchennikova – Colorado Springs, CO (Gymnastics Academy of the Rockies)
- MyKayla Skinner – Gilbert, AZ (Desert Lights)
- Meredith Sylvia – Macungie (Parkettes)
- Macy Toronjo – Huntsville, TX (Texas Dreams)
- Kiana Winston – Fort Worth, TX (Texas Dreams)
