= 2012 United States Olympic trials (gymnastics) =

2012 U.S. Olympic trials
- Venue: HP Pavilion
- Location: San Jose, California
- Date: June 29 – July 1, 2012

The 2012 U.S. Olympic gymnastics team trials were held from June 29 through July 1, 2012, at the HP Pavilion (now known as SAP Center) in San Jose, California.

== Venue ==
The SAP Center, formally known as HP Pavilion, has a capacity of up to 19,190 spectators for concerts, is home to the National Hockey League team, the San Jose Sharks.

== Participants ==
=== Women ===
The top 8 finishers from the 2012 VISA Championships received automatic berth to the trials.

Name	Hometown	Club	College	Nationals
Kennedy Baker	Flower Mound, TX	Texas Dreams Gymnastics	Florida Gators	7th
Gabby Douglas	Virginia Beach, VA	Chow's Gymnastics	— (Note: Athlete turned professional, forfeiting NCAA eligibility)	2nd
Sarah Finnegan	St. Louis, MO	GAGE	LSU Tigers	6th
Elizabeth Price	Coopersburg, PA	Parkettes	Stanford Cardinal	5th
Aly Raisman	Needham, MA	Brestyan's	—	3rd
Kyla Ross	Aliso Viejo, CA	Gym-Max Gymnastics	UCLA Bruins	4th
Sabrina Vega	Carmel, NY	GAGE	Georgia Gymdogs	8th
Jordyn Wieber	DeWitt, MI	Gedderts Twistars	—	1st

The following people successfully petitioned their way to Olympic trials:

Name	Hometown	Club	College
Rebecca Bross	Plano, TX	WOGA	—
Brenna Dowell	Odessa, MO	GAGE	Oklahoma Sooners
Anna Li	Aurora, IL	Legacy Elite	UCLA Bruins
Nastia Liukin	Plano, TX	WOGA	—
McKayla Maroney	Laguna Niguel, CA	All Olympia	—
Alicia Sacramone	Boston, MA	Brestyan's	Brown Bears (Note: Sacramone competed for 1 season in the NCAA before turning pro.)
~~Bridget Sloan~~ (Note: Sloan successfully petitioned to trials but was injured during warmups and therefore could not compete.)	Pittsboro, IN	Sharp's Gymnastics Academy	Florida Gators

=== Men ===
Name	Hometown	Club
Chris Brooks	Houston, TX	Cypress Gymnastics
Alex Buscaglia	Cary, IL	Stanford University
Jake Dalton	Reno, NV	University of Oklahoma
Josh Dixon	San Jose, CA	USOTC
Jonathan Horton	Houston, TX	Cypress Gymnastics
Glen Ishino	Santa Ana, CA	UC Berkeley
Steven Legendre	Port Jefferson, NY	University of Oklahoma
Danell Leyva	Miami, FL	Universal Gymnastics
CJ Maestas	Corrales, NM	University of Illinois
Sam Mikulak	Ann Arbor, MI	University of Michigan
Alex Naddour	Gilbert, AZ	USA Youth Fitness
John Orozco	Bronx, NY	USOTC
Paul Ruggeri	Manlius, NY	University of Illinois
David Sender	Arlington Heights, IL	University of Illinois
Brandon Wynn	Voorhees, NJ	Ohio State University

== Broadcast ==
NBC broadcast both nights of competition at trials.

== Results ==
=== Final standings ===
Event	Gold	Silver	Bronze
Women
All-around	Gabby Douglas	Jordyn Wieber	Aly Raisman
Vault	McKayla Maroney	Alicia Sacramone	—N/a
Uneven Bars	Gabby Douglas Kyla Ross	—N/a	Anna Li
Balance Beam	Aly Raisman	Alicia Sacramone	Kyla Ross Jordyn Wieber
Floor Exercise	Aly Raisman	Jordyn Wieber	Gabby Douglas
Men
All-around	Danell Leyva	John Orozco	Jonathan Horton
Floor	Jake Dalton	Steven Legendre	Paul Ruggeri
Pommel horse	Alex Naddour	Danell Leyva	John Orozco
Rings	Jonathan Horton	Brandon Wynn	John Orozco
Vault	Jake Dalton	David Sender	Steven Legendre
Parallel bars	Danell Leyva	Jonathan Horton	John Orozco
Horizontal bar	Danell Leyva	John Orozco	Paul Ruggeri

=== Final Scores ===
Full Olympic Trial scores are as follows:

Rank	Gymnast	Vault (gymnastics)	Uneven bars	Balance beam	Floor (gymnastics)	Day Total	Total
1st place, gold medalist(s)	Gabby Douglas	15.800	15.250	14.900	15.450	61.400	123.450
1st place, gold medalist(s)	Gabby Douglas	16.000	15.900	14.850	15.300	62.050	123.450
2nd place, silver medalist(s)	Jordyn Wieber	15.900	15.350	15.050	15.400	61.700	123.350
2nd place, silver medalist(s)	Jordyn Wieber	15.800	15.350	14.900	15.600	61.650	123.350
3rd place, bronze medalist(s)	Aly Raisman	15.550	14.200	14.950	15.600	60.300	120.950
3rd place, bronze medalist(s)	Aly Raisman	15.300	14.450	15.400	15.500	60.650	120.950
4	Elizabeth Price	16.050	14.500	14.150	14.900	59.600	120.100
4	Elizabeth Price	15.700	15.300	14.550	14.950	60.500	120.100
5	Kyla Ross	14.500	15.500	14.900	14.500	59.400	120.000
5	Kyla Ross	15.150	15.650	15.050	14.750	60.600	120.000
6	Sarah Finnegan	15.000	14.400	15.100	14.550	59.050	118.500
6	Sarah Finnegan	14.900	14.750	14.800	15.000	59.450	118.500
7	McKayla Maroney	16.100	13.350	13.650	15.200	58.300	117.650
7	McKayla Maroney	16.150	13.700	15.000	14.500	59.350	117.650
8	Kennedy Baker	14.650	13.900	13.000	14.600	56.150	114.700
8	Kennedy Baker	14.700	14.850	14.300	14.700	58.550	114.700
9	Brenna Dowell	14.900	14.250	14.000	14.100	57.250	114.450
9	Brenna Dowell	14.750	14.400	13.900	14.150	57.200	114.450
10	Sabrina Vega	14.250	13.150	14.250	14.350	56.000	113.400
10	Sabrina Vega	14.400	13.450	14.550	15.000	57.400	113.400
11	Alicia Sacramone	15.700	–	15.000	–	30.700	61.650
11	Alicia Sacramone	15.800	–	15.150	–	30.950	61.650
12	Anna Li	–	15.500	13.100	–	28.600	58.650
12	Anna Li	–	15.550	14.500	–	30.050	58.650
13	Nastia Liukin	–	14.050	14.500	–	28.550	57.450
13	Nastia Liukin	–	13.950	14.950	–	28.900	57.450
14	Rebecca Bross	–	15.300	12.050	–	27.350	52.800
14	Rebecca Bross	–	10.550	14.900	–	25.450	52.800

== Olympic Team selection ==
For the women's team, Gabby Douglas, McKayla Maroney, Aly Raisman, Kyla Ross, and Jordyn Wieber were selected to represent the United States at the 2012 Summer Olympics in London, England. Anna Li, Sarah Finnegan, and Elizabeth Price were selected as the alternates.

For the men's team Danell Leyva and John Orozco automatically earned Olympic berths by finishing first and second in the all-around and recording three or more top three finishes in the individual event standings. The men's selection team also named Jake Dalton, Jonathan Horton, and Sam Mikulak to the team. The replacement athletes selected were Chris Brooks, Alex Naddour, and Steven Legendre.
