= Polina Shchennikova =

Russian-American artistic gymnast

- Full name: Polina Aleksandrovna Shchennikova
- Nicknames: Pushkie, Po
- Born: January 7, 1998 (age 28) Moscow, Russia

Gymnastics career
- Discipline: Women's artistic gymnastics
- Country represented: United States (2012–13)
- College team: Michigan Wolverines
- Training location: Arvada, Colorado, U.S.
- Club: 5280
- Choreographer: Dominic Zito
- Retired: 2016

Polina Aleksandrovna Shchennikova (Russian: Полина Александровна Шенникова; born January 7, 1998) is a Russian-American former artistic gymnast and current coach. She was a member of the U.S. national team from 2012 to 2013.

== Early life ==
Shchennikova was born in Moscow but moved to the United States when she was one year old. Both her parents competed as gymnasts for the Soviet national team. She has two sisters, Alyona and Kristina, both of whom are also gymnasts.

== Gymnastics career ==
Shchennikova made her debut at the junior elite level in 2010 and placed 39th in the all-around at the 2010 U.S. Classic. She finished third in the all-around at the 2011 American Classic and qualified for the 2011 U.S. Championships. There, she finished 19th in the all-around.

Shchennikova tied with Alex McMurtry for second place in the all-around at the 2012 Nastia Liukin Cup, where she had the top uneven bars score of the competition. She also won the uneven bars at the 2012 American Classic. She then won a silver medal on the uneven bars at the U.S. Classic, behind Katelyn Ohashi. At the 2012 U.S. Championships, she placed tenth in the all-around and fourth on the uneven bars. She was added to the junior U.S. national team after a November 2012 training camp.

At the 2013 U.S. Classic, Shchennikova won a bronze medal on the uneven bars and placed eighth in the all-around. She also won the uneven bars bronze medal at the 2013 U.S. Championships and was named to the junior U.S. national team for a second year. She became age-eligible for senior elite competitions in 2014 but missed the season due to a stress fracture in her back. She returned to the U.S. national team training camps at the end of the year.

Shchennikova returned to competition in 2015 but only competed on the uneven bars and the balance beam at the 2015 U.S. Classic. She finished 11th on the uneven bars and 16th on the balance beam. She was not able to finish the competition at the 2015 U.S. Championships due to a back injury. She stopped competing at the elite level and had surgery to repair a torn labrum in May 2016. She joined the Michigan Wolverines gymnastics team in 2017 and competed on the vault, uneven bars, and balance beam throughout her first two seasons. She retired from gymnastics after her sophomore year at Michigan due to back injuries.

== Coaching career ==
After retiring from gymnastics, Shchennikova became the student assistant coach for the Michigan Wolverines gymnastics team. She then spent one season as a volunteer assistant coach for the Air Force Falcons. In 2025, she acquired ownership of her parents' gym, PAK Gymnastics, in Lehi, Utah.
