= 2012 U.S. National Gymnastics Championships =

2012 Visa U.S. National Gymnastics Championships
- Venue: Chaifetz Arena
- Location: St. Louis, Missouri U.S.
- Date: June 7, 2012—June 10, 2012

The 2012 Visa U.S. National Gymnastics Championships was the 49th edition of the U.S. National Gymnastics Championships. The competition was held from June 7–10, 2012 at the Chaifetz Arena in St. Louis, Missouri.

== Event information ==
The forty-ninth edition of the Championships, the competition was held at the Chaifetz Arena in St. Louis, Missouri, a multi-purpose arena located on the Saint Louis University campus. The competition was televised by NBC Sports Network.

=== Competition schedule ===
The competition featured Senior and Junior competitions for both women's and men's disciplines. The competition was as follows;

Thursday, June 7
1 p.m. - Junior Men Competition - Day 1
6:30 p.m. - Senior Men's Competition - Day 1

Friday, June 8
1 p.m. - Junior Women's Competition - Day 1
6:30 p.m. - Senior Women's Competition - Day 1

Saturday, June 9
11:30 a.m. - Senior Men's Competition - Final Day
6 p.m. - Junior Men's Competition - Final Day

Sunday, June 10
10 a.m. - Junior Women's Competition - Final Day
2:30 p.m. - Senior Women's Competition - Final Day

Note: all times are in Central Time Zone.

=== Sponsorship ===
Visa was the title sponsor of the event as they had been since 2004.

== Medalists ==
Event	Gold	Silver	Bronze
Senior Women
Individual all-around	Jordyn Wieber	Gabby Douglas	Aly Raisman
Vault	Alicia Sacramone	Brandie Jay	MyKayla Skinner
Uneven bars	Gabby Douglas	Kyla Ross	Anna Li
Balance beam	Aly Raisman	Sarah Finnegan	Alicia Sacramone
Floor	Aly Raisman	Jordyn Wieber	Gabby Douglas
Junior Women
Individual all-around	Lexie Priessman	Madison Desch	Simone Biles
Vault	Simone Biles	Lexie Priessman	Bailie Key
Uneven bars	Katelyn Ohashi	Lexie Priessman	Amelia Hundley
Balance beam	Madison Desch	Katelyn Ohashi	Bailie Key
Floor	Lexie Priessman	Katelyn Ohashi	Madison Desch Bailie Key
Senior Men
Individual all-around	John Orozco	Danell Leyva	Sam Mikulak
Floor	Jacob Dalton	Paul Ruggeri Steven Legendre	N/A
Pommel horse	Alexander Naddour	Glen Ishino	John Orozco
Rings	Jonathan Horton	Brandon Wynn	John Orozco
Vault	Sean Senters Jacob Dalton	N/A	Eddie Penev
Parallel bars	Danell Leyva	Sam Mikulak	John Orozco Chris Brooks
Horizontal bar	Danell Leyva	John Orozco	Jonathan Horton

== National team ==
The following seniors were named to the National Team – Jordyn Wieber, Gabby Douglas, Aly Raisman, Kyla Ross, Elizabeth Price, Sarah Finnegan, Sabrina Vega, Kennedy Baker, Brenna Dowell, Bridget Sloan, McKayla Maroney, Alicia Sacramone, Rebecca Bross, Anna Li, and Nastia Liukin. The following juniors were named to the National Team – Lexie Priessman, Madison Desch, Simone Biles, Bailie Key, Katelyn Ohashi, Amelia Hundley.

== Participants ==
The following individuals are participating in competition:

=== Senior ===
- Kennedy Baker – Flower Mound, TX
- Mackenzie Brannan – Austin, TX
- Rebecca Bross – Plano, TX
- Brianna Brown – West Chester, OH
- Gabby Douglas – Virginia Beach, VA
- Brenna Dowell – Odessa, MO
- Sarah Finnegan – St. Louis, MO
- Brandie Jay – Fort Collins, CO
- Amanda Jetter – Milford, OH
- Anna Li – Aurora, IL
- Nastia Liukin – Parker, TX
- McKayla Maroney – Long Beach, CA
- Grace McLaughlin – Allen, TX
- Abigail Milliet – Denton, TX
- Elizabeth Price – Coopersburg, PA
- Alexandra Raisman – Needham, MA
- Kyla Ross – Aliso Viejo, CA
- Alicia Sacramone – Winchester, MA
- MyKayla Skinner – Gilbert, AZ
- Bridget Sloan – Pittsboro, IN
- Sabrina Vega – Carmel, NY
- Jordyn Wieber – DeWitt, MI
- McKenzie Wofford – McKinney, TX

=== Junior ===
- Alexis Beucler – Findlay, OH
- Simone Biles – Spring, TX
- Lacy Dagen – Pleasanton, CA
- Nia Dennis – New Albany, OH
- Madison Desch – Lenexa, KS
- Peyton Ernst – Coppell, TX
- Ashley Foss – Towaco, NJ
- Ariana Guerra – League City, TX
- Lauren Hernandez – Old Bridge, NJ
- Amanda Huang – Roswell, GA
- Veronica Hults – Allen, TX
- Amelia Hundley – Hamilton, OH
- Bailie Key – Coppell, TX
- Ashton Kim – Westlake, TX
- Nicole Lehrmann – Cedar Park, TX
- Shannon McNatt – Houston, TX
- Maggie Nichols – Little Canada, MN
- Katelyn Ohashi – Plano, TX
- Lexie Priessman – Cincinnati, OH
- Polina Shchennikova – Arvada, CO
- Megan Skaggs – Marietta, GA
- Meredith Sylvia – Macungie, PA
- Jessica Wang – Chino Hills, CA
