= Brandie Jay =

American artistic gymnast

Brandie Jay Dorminey
- Full name: Brandie Jean Jay
- Born: November 26, 1993 (age 32) Fort Collins, Colorado
- Height: 5 ft 3 in (1.60 m)

Gymnastics career
- Discipline: Women's artistic gymnastics
- Country represented: United States (2011–2012)
- College team: Georgia Gymdogs (2013–2016)
- Gym: GK's Gymnastics
- Head coach: Danna Durante
- Former coach: Gene Koehnke
- Retired: 2016
Medal record
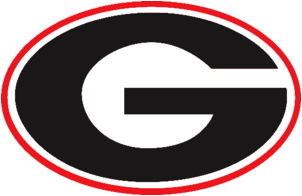
Representing United States
Pan American Games
Gold medal – first place	2011 Guadalajara	Team
Gold medal – first place	2011 Guadalajara	Vault
Representing University of Georgia
NCAA Championships
Gold medal – first place	2016 Fort Worth	Vault

Brandie Jay Dorminey (born November 26, 1993) is an American former elite artistic gymnast. She won two gold medals at the 2011 Pan American Games with the team and on vault. She attended the University of Georgia and competed for the Georgia Gymdogs. During her senior year at Georgia, she won the NCAA national title on the vault.

== Gymnastics career ==
Jay began gymnastics at the age of three after watching the Magnificent Seven win team gold at the 1996 Summer Olympics. She won the all-around and the vault at the 2010 Level 10 National Championships. She moved up to the elite level later that year and won a bronze medal on the vault at the 2010 U.S. Championships.

Jay finished third in the all-around and won the vault at the 2011 American Classic, qualifying to the 2011 U.S. Championships as a result. There, she finished third on the vault and placed 11th in the all-around. As a result, she was invited to the selection camp for the 2011 World Championships and the 2011 Pan American Games. She was selected to represent the United States at the 2011 Pan American Games and helped the team win the gold medal. She also advanced into the vault final, where she won another gold medal.

At the 2012 U.S. Championships, Jay won the silver medal on the vault, behind Alicia Sacramone, and placed 17th in the all-around after falling three times. She was not selected to compete at the 2012 U.S. Olympic Trials. She enrolled at the University of Georgia in the fall of 2012 to begin competing for the Georgia Gymdogs in the 2013 season. During her freshman, sophomore, and junior years, she was named an All-American on the vault. During her senior year, she won both the SEC and the NCAA vault titles. She remained at Georgia for another year as the team's graduate student coach.

== Competitive history ==
Competitive history of Brandie Jay
Year	Event	Team	AA	VT	UB	BB	FX
Senior
2011	WOGA Classic		2nd place, silver medalist(s)	1st place, gold medalist(s)	3rd place, bronze medalist(s)	6	4
2011	American Classic		3rd place, bronze medalist(s)	1st place, gold medalist(s)	4	7	
2011	U.S. Classic		9	2nd place, silver medalist(s)	9	20	15
2011	U.S. Championships		11	3rd place, bronze medalist(s)	7	17	15
2011	Pan American Games	1st place, gold medalist(s)	6	1st place, gold medalist(s)			
2012	U.S. Classic		6	5	6	19	7
2012	U.S. Championships		16	2nd place, silver medalist(s)	14	21	17
NCAA
2013	NCAA Championships	6					
2014	NCAA Championships	5					
2015	NCAA Championships			7			
2016	NCAA Championships	6		1st place, gold medalist(s)			
