= Kyla Ross =

American artistic gymnast (born 1996)

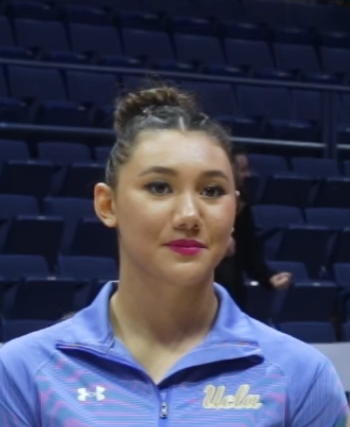
- Ross in 2018

Personal information
- Full name: Kyla Briana Ross
- Nicknames: Mighty Mouse, Silver Princess, Kyla Boss
- Born: October 24, 1996 (age 30) Honolulu, Hawaii, U.S.
- Height: 5 ft 7 in (170 cm)

Gymnastics career
- Discipline: Women's artistic gymnastics
- Country represented: United States; (2009–2016)
- College team: UCLA Bruins
- Club: Gym-Max Gymnastics
- Former coaches: Jenny Zhang and Howie Liang, Valorie Kondos Field, Randy Lane, Chris Waller and Jordyn Wieber, Kristina Comforte, Dom Palange, and BJ Das
- Retired: March 12, 2020
Medal record
Event	1st	2nd	3rd
Olympic Games	1	0	0
World Championships	1	3	1
Pacific Rim Championships	5	5	1
Pan American Championships	2	1	0
Women's gymnastics
Representing the United States
Olympic Games
Gold medal – first place	2012 London	Team
World Championships
Gold medal – first place	2014 Nanning	Team
Silver medal – second place	2013 Antwerp	All-around
Silver medal – second place	2013 Antwerp	Uneven bars
Silver medal – second place	2013 Antwerp	Balance beam
Bronze medal – third place	2014 Nanning	All-around
Pacific Rim Championships
Gold medal – first place	2010 Melbourne	Team
Gold medal – first place	2012 Seattle	Team
Gold medal – first place	2012 Seattle	Balance beam
Gold medal – first place	2014 Richmond	Team
Gold medal – first place	2014 Richmond	Balance beam
Silver medal – second place	2012 Seattle	All-around
Silver medal – second place	2012 Seattle	Uneven bars
Silver medal – second place	2014 Richmond	All-around
Silver medal – second place	2014 Richmond	Uneven bars
Silver medal – second place	2014 Richmond	Floor exercise
Bronze medal – third place	2012 Seattle	Floor exercise
Pan American Championships
Gold medal – first place	2010 Guadalajara	Team
Gold medal – first place	2010 Guadalajara	All-around
Silver medal – second place	2010 Guadalajara	Floor exercise
Representing UCLA Bruins
NCAA Championships
Gold medal – first place	2017 St Louis	Uneven bars
Gold medal – first place	2017 St Louis	Balance beam
Gold medal – first place	2018 St Louis	Team
Gold medal – first place	2019 Fort Worth	Vault
Gold medal – first place	2019 Fort Worth	Floor exercise
Silver medal – second place	2018 St Louis	Balance beam
Silver medal – second place	2019 Fort Worth	All-around
Bronze medal – third place	2018 St Louis	Uneven bars
Bronze medal – third place	2019 Fort Worth	Team
- Awards: See awards

Kyla Ross
Current position
- Title: Associate Head Coach
- Team: Arkansas Razorbacks
- Conference: SEC

Biographical details
- Education: UCLA

Coaching career (HC unless noted)
- 2021: UCLA (Undergrad Asst.)
- 2022: Arkansas (Volunteer Asst.)
- 2023–2026: Arkansas (Asst.)
- 2027–present: Arkansas (Associate HC)

Kyla Briana Ross Rittman (née Ross, born October 24, 1996) is an American retired artistic gymnast and current assistant coach for the Arkansas Razorbacks gymnastics team. She is the first female gymnast to win NCAA, World, and Olympic championship titles.

Ross was an international elite gymnast from 2009 to 2016. During her junior elite career, she won two national all-around titles (2009, 2010) and the 2010 Pan American all-around title. In her first year as a senior gymnast, she was the youngest member of the U.S. women's gymnastics team at the 2012 Summer Olympics; dubbed the Fierce Five, the squad won the gold medal in the team competition. Ross was the 2013 World all-around, uneven bars, and balance beam silver medalist. At the 2014 World Championships, she was a member of the gold medal-winning U.S. team and the all-around bronze medalist.

In February 2016, she retired from elite gymnastics to attend college. That fall, she enrolled at the University of California, Los Angeles (UCLA) and joined the university's NCAA gymnastics team. She won the uneven bars and balance beam titles at the 2017 NCAA Championships and then helped UCLA win the team title at the 2018 NCAA Championships. On March 16, 2019, she became the 11th NCAA gymnast to achieve a "Gym Slam", having earned a perfect 10 score on all four apparatuses. One week later, she became the second NCAA gymnast, after Maggie Nichols, to achieve a second Gym Slam. She then won the vault and floor exercise titles at the 2019 NCAA Championships. Her senior season was cut short due to the COVID-19 pandemic, leading her to retire from gymnastics. She joined the UCLA coaching staff as an Undergraduate Assistant Coach for one year while finishing her degree, and she joined the Arkansas coaching staff for the 2022 season.

== Early life ==
Kyla Briana Ross was born on October 24, 1996, in Honolulu, Hawaii, to Kiana and Jason Ross. Her mother is of Filipino, German, and Puerto Rican descent and her father is of African American and Japanese descent. Her father was a minor league baseball outfielder for six years. She has two younger siblings, McKenna and Kayne. Her sister McKenna played for the Hawaii Rainbow Wahine volleyball team.

== Early gymnastics career ==
Ross's parents said their daughter was always very strong and had a lot of energy, leading them to enroll her in gymnastics classes. Ross began gymnastics when she was three years old in Greenville, South Carolina, and also trained in Richmond, Virginia, before the family settled in Aliso Viejo, California. In 2005, she began training alongside future Olympic teammate McKayla Maroney at the Gym-Max Academy of Gymnastics under coaches Howie and Jenny Liang. Ross found early success as a competitive gymnast. At the 2008 Junior Olympic national championships, she won the balance beam, floor exercise, and all-around titles and finished second on vault.

== Junior elite gymnastics career ==
=== 2009 ===
Ross began competing as a junior elite gymnast in 2009. In April, she competed at the American Classic in San Diego, California and placed second in the all-around behind McKenzie Wofford with a score of 55.316. She then won the all-around title at the U.S. Classic in Des Moines, Iowa. In August, she competed at the U.S. Championships in Dallas, Texas. She had the lead in the all-around competition after the first day of competition. Despite a mistake on the uneven bars, she maintained her lead on the second day of competition and became the junior national all-around champion. She also won the vault and balance beam titles. She was then selected to compete at the Junior Pan American Championships in Aracaju, Brazil, alongside Bridgette Caquatto, Aly Raisman, and Sabrina Vega. Making her international debut, Ross contributed to the team's 14-point victory over Canada in addition to winning the individual all-around title. In the event finals, she won gold medals on the uneven bars and balance beam and a silver medal on the floor exercise behind Raisman.

=== 2010 ===
In March, Ross competed at the City of Jesolo Trophy in Jesolo, Italy, where she placed second in the all-around behind Russia's Anastasia Grishina. The following month, she was selected to compete at the Pacific Rim Championships in Melbourne, Australia. The team, which included junior gymnasts Ross and Jordyn Wieber and senior gymnasts Raisman and Rebecca Bross, won the gold medal, beating China by more than 15 points. Individually, Ross placed second behind Wieber in the all-around. Then in the event finals, she won a gold medal on the vault and silver medals on the uneven bars and floor exercise.

At the U.S. Classic in Chicago, Ross placed third behind Wieber and Katelyn Ohashi in the all-around and had the highest score on the balance beam. The following month, she competed at the U.S. Championships in Hartford, Connecticut, as the defending junior national champion. Despite a fall on uneven bars during her warm-up, she earned the highest score on the event on Day 1 of the competition. She then fell off the uneven bars on day two, but she finished strong on the balance beam to win her second straight junior all-around title. She also won the national title on the balance beam and placed third on the vault and floor exercise.

In September, Ross competed at the Pan American Championships in Guadalajara, Mexico. She and teammates Sabrina Vega, McKayla Maroney, Gabby Douglas, Brenna Dowell, and Sarah Finnegan beat silver medalist Canada by nearly 20 points. Individually, she placed first in the all-around, ahead of Vega and Jessica López of Venezuela. In the event finals, she won the silver medal on the floor exercise behind Maroney and placed sixth on the uneven bars.

=== 2011 ===
Ross again competed at the City of Jesolo Trophy in March. She and teammates Katelyn Ohashi, Madison Kocian, Lexie Priessman, Elizabeth Price, and Ericha Fassbender won the team event over Russia by more than ten points. She also won the all-around competition with a score of 58.750, a point ahead of Kocian who won the silver medal. Additionally, Ross won the gold medal on the balance beam and the silver medals on the vault behind Priessman and on the uneven bars behind Anastasia Grishina.

At the U.S. Classic in Chicago in July, Ross debuted an Amanar vault on her way to winning the all-around gold medal. She entered the U.S. Championships in Saint Paul, Minnesota, in August as the two-time defending junior champion. She struggled on the first day of competition, falling on a double pike on floor exercise and her Amanar vault was devalued to a double-twisting Yurchenko. On the second day, she earned full credit for her Amanar, and her all-around total for the day bested Ohashi's, 60.150 to 60.000. However, she finished with a two-day total of 117.65 to Ohashi's 120.95 and earned the all-around silver medal.

== Senior elite gymnastics career ==
=== 2012 ===
Because her 16th birthday fell within the calendar year, Ross became a senior elite gymnast in 2012 and was eligible to compete at the Olympic Games. In March, she made her senior debut at the 2012 Pacific Rim Gymnastics Championships in Everett, Washington. The U.S. team consisted of senior gymnasts Ross, Jordyn Wieber, and Gabby Douglas, and junior gymnasts Lexie Priessman, Katelyn Ohashi, and Amelia Hundley. They easily won the competition, beating silver medalist China by nearly 20 points. Individually, Ross placed second in the all-around behind Wieber, the reigning World all-around champion. Then in the event finals, she won a gold medal on the balance beam, a silver medal on the uneven bars, and a bronze medal on the floor exercise. Later that month, Ross competed at the City of Jesolo Trophy for the third straight year. The U.S. team again earned an easy victory, finishing more than ten points ahead of silver medalist Italy. Ross also won the all-around competition ahead of teammates Aly Raisman and Sarah Finnegan. She also claimed titles on uneven bars and balance beam and a bronze medal on vault.

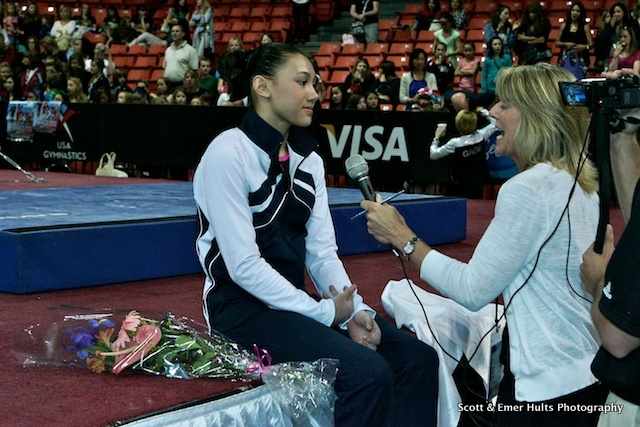
Ross giving an interview after finishing second in the all-around at the 2012 U.S. Classic

At the U.S. Classic, Ross placed second in the all-around behind Raisman despite struggling with her Amanar vault. She performed well on the uneven bars to finish second to Douglas on that apparatus. The following month, she competed at the U.S. Championships in St. Louis, Missouri. She placed fourth in the all-around on the first day of competition and earned the highest score of the day on uneven bars. However, she competed a lower-difficulty vault at the recommendation of the national team coordinator Márta Károlyi and stepped out of bounds on the floor exercise. She improved her all-around total score on the second day, but she remained in fourth place behind Wieber, Douglas, and Raisman. As a result, she qualified for the Olympic Trials. Additionally, she won the silver medal on the uneven bars, behind Douglas.

At the beginning of July, Ross competed at the Olympic Trials in San Jose, California. She placed fifth in the all-around and tied with Douglas for first on the uneven bars. Afterward, she was chosen as a member of the team that would be sent to the 2012 Summer Olympics alongside Douglas, Maroney, Raisman, and Wieber. Ross was featured on the cover of Sports Illustrated with the rest of the team in the July 18, 2012, "Olympic Preview" issue. It was the first time an entire Olympic gymnastics team had been featured on the cover of Sports Illustrated.

==== London Olympics ====
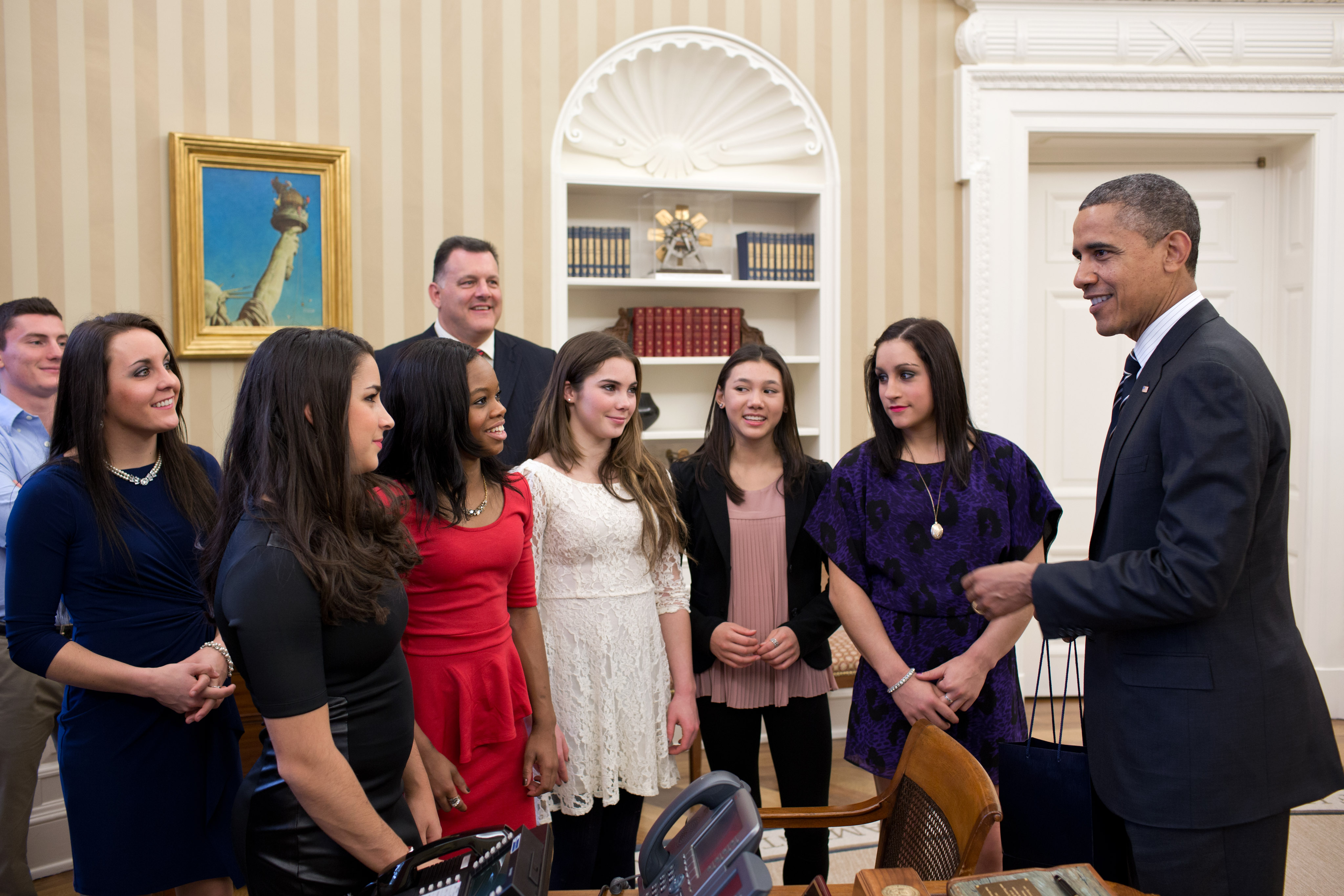
Ross and the rest of the Fierce Five meeting President Barack Obama

At the end of July, Ross competed at the 2012 Summer Olympics in London, United Kingdom, and she was the youngest member of the entire United States Olympic team. She helped the American team, nicknamed the "Fierce Five", qualify first to the team final by competing on the uneven bars, balance beam, and floor exercise in the qualification round. Ross finished 11th on the uneven bars, making her the second reserve for the event final. Despite finishing sixth on the balance beam, she did not qualify for the event final because of the two-per-country rule, as Douglas and Raisman both finished ahead of her. In the team final, she contributed scores of 14.933 on uneven bars and 15.133 on balance beam toward the team's victory. They became the second U.S. team, after the "Magnificent Seven" in 1996, to win the team competition.

After the Olympic Games, Ross appeared with her teammates on The Today Show and Late Show with David Letterman and also rang the closing bell at the New York Stock Exchange. They also performed on Dancing with the Stars in support of 2008 Olympic gymnast Shawn Johnson. She performed on the 40-city Kellogg's Tour of Gymnastics Champions before returning home to train full-time for the upcoming season.

=== 2013 ===
Ross was slated to compete at the 2013 American Cup but withdrew because of a bruised heal. However, she performed an exhibition balance beam routine after the competition had ended. In March, she was chosen to participate in the U.S. European tour team to compete in the City of Jesolo Trophy and the USA-Germany-Romania Tri-Meet in Chemnitz, Germany. At Jesolo, she won gold medals with the team and on the uneven bars and silver medals in the all-around and on the balance beam. At the Chemnitz meet, she contributed to the U.S.'s first-place finish and won the all-around ahead of Simone Biles. As of 2024, Ross is the most recent gymnast to defeat Biles in an all-around competition.

At the U.S. Classic in July, Ross won gold medals in the all-around and on uneven bars and a silver medal on balance beam. Then at the U.S. Championships in August, she finished second in the all-around to Biles and won gold on uneven bars and balance beam. She was then selected to compete at the World Championships in Antwerp, Belgium. There, she won the all-around silver medal behind Biles, and she received the Longines Prize for Elegance along with male gymnast Kohei Uchimura of Japan. Then in the event finals, she won a silver medal on the uneven bars behind Huang Huidan and another silver medal on the balance beam behind Aliya Mustafina.

=== 2014 ===
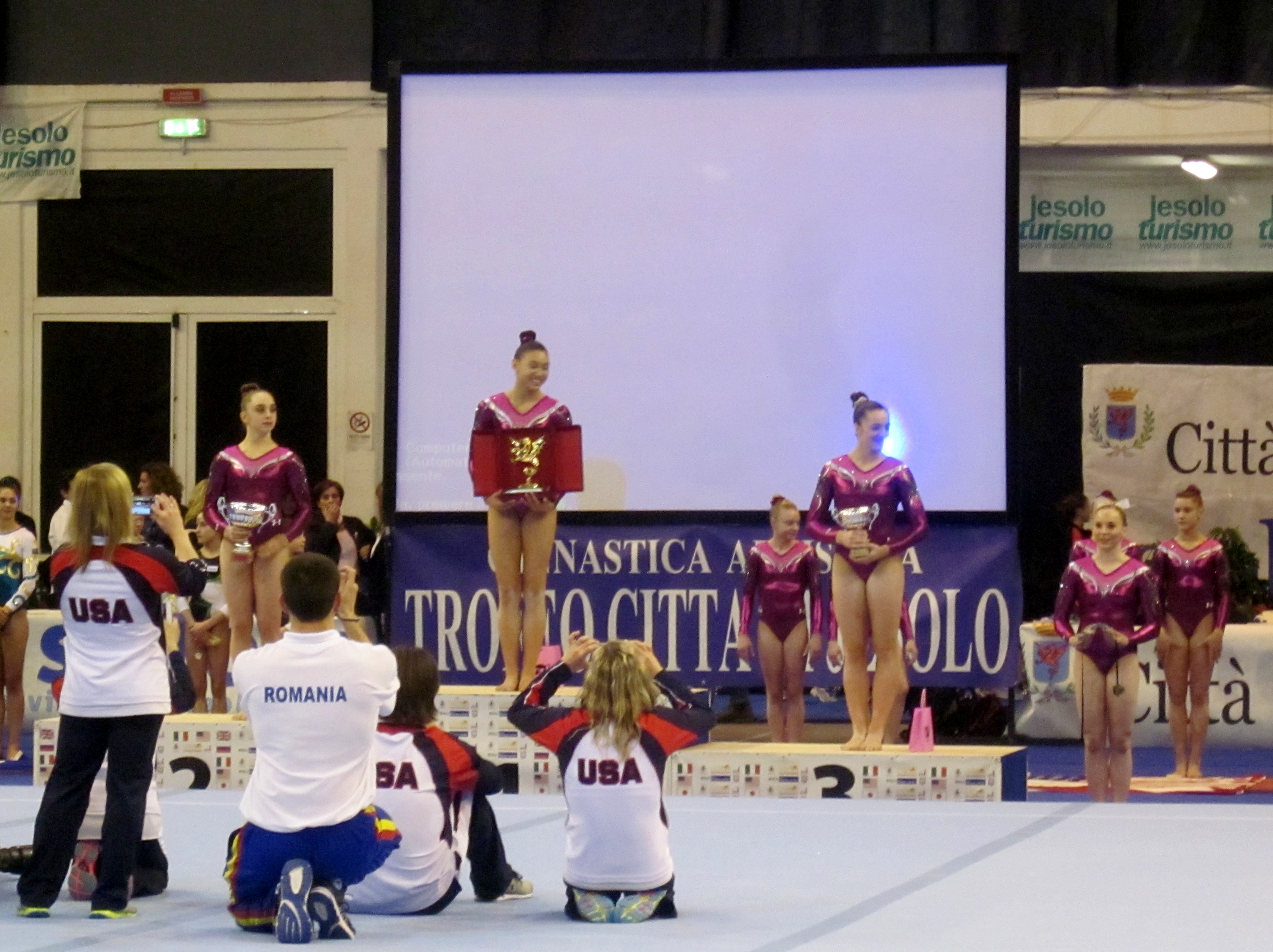
The all-around podium at the 2014 City of Jesolo Trophy (Ross center)

Ross was selected to compete at the American Cup but withdrew because of a back injury. In March, she competed at the City of Jesolo Trophy, where she won a gold medal with the team and won her third Jesolo all-around title despite a full point deduction for balking her first vault attempt. She also won silver medals on the uneven bars and floor exercise. The following month, she competed at the Pacific Rim Championships in Richmond, Canada. She won gold medals with the team and on the balance beam and took silver in the all-around, uneven bars, and floor exercise.

In August, Ross competed at the U.S. Classic, where she finished first on balance beam, second in the all-around behind Simone Biles and on floor exercise, and third on uneven bars. Later that month, she competed at the U.S. Championships and once again finished second in the all-around to Biles and won the national balance beam title. She also had the highest execution score total of the competition.

On September 17, Ross was selected to compete at the 2014 World Championships in Nanning, China, alongside Biles, Alyssa Baumann, Madison Kocian, Ashton Locklear, and MyKayla Skinner. She competed at the competition despite a minor hip and hamstring injury. Ross competed on all four events in the team final, including being the lead off on three events, helping the United States easily win the World title. She then won the all-around bronze medal behind Biles and Romanian Larisa Iordache. She also qualified for the balance beam final, where she finished sixth.

=== 2015–2016 ===
On February 22, 2015, Ross announced on Twitter that she had committed to the University of California, Los Angeles's gymnastics team where her former Fierce Five teammate, Jordyn Wieber, was team manager. Ross signed the National Letter of Intent to the Bruins on April 15, 2015, but deferred her enrollment until the 2016–17 season to focus on qualifying for the 2016 Summer Olympics.

Ross began the 2015 season at the City of Jesolo Trophy and helped the United States win a team gold medal despite her falling on the floor exercise. She did qualify for the uneven bars final and won the gold medal. She struggled to train consistently over the summer due to an ankle injury. In July, she competed on two events at the U.S. Classic. She struggled on the uneven bars and attempted a full twisting Pak salto for the first time but fell. She did place fourth on the balance beam. Then in August, she competed in the all-around at the U.S. Championships. Although she finished third on the balance beam, she struggled on the other events and only finished tenth in the all-around. She received the final automatic spot for the U.S. National team and an invitation to the 2015 World Championships selection camp. Ross withdrew from the selection camp, removing herself from contention for the 2015 World Championships team.

On February 22, 2016, Ross announced on her social medal that she was retiring from elite gymnastics. She had decided not to pursue the Olympic Games, and would instead focus on competing in collegiate gymnastics for the UCLA Bruins.

== NCAA gymnastics career ==
=== 2017 ===
Ross began attending the University of California, Los Angeles in the fall of 2016 and joined the UCLA Bruins gymnastics program. Her collegiate debut came on January 7, 2017, in a home meet against Arkansas where she placed first on the uneven bars, third on vault, and eighth on balance beam. Ross and 2016 Olympic gold medalist Madison Kocian made history by becoming the first Olympic gold medalists to compete as NCAA gymnasts. She scored her first perfect 10 on January 28, 2017, at Oregon State on the uneven bars to help UCLA win the meet. Then at Utah, she scored another perfect 10 on the uneven bars, and two days later, she scored her first perfect 10 on the balance beam at a home tri-meet against Utah State and Bridgeport. She finished the regular season ranked first in the country on the uneven bars.

At the Pac-12 Championships, Ross captured the balance beam title by scoring the first-ever perfect 10 on balance beam at the Pac-12 Championships. She was also named the Pac-12 Freshman of the Year, UCLA's first gymnast to win the award since 2011. She earned first-team All-Pac-12 honors on vault, uneven bars and balance beam and first-team regular season All-American honors on uneven bars and balance beam. Then at the NCAA Championship, Ross won the national title on the balance beam with a score of 9.9725, and she was part of a six-way tie for the national uneven bars title with a score of 9.950. By earning these two national titles, Ross made history as the first female gymnast to become an Olympic, World, and NCAA Champion. She helped UCLA place fourth in the Super Six.

=== 2018 ===
Ross scored a career-high 39.700 in the all-around to help UCLA win the Metroplex Challenge against LSU, Washington, and North Carolina State. She scored her first perfect 10 of the season at Stanford on the uneven bars on March 11, 2018. She received first-team All-Pac-12 and All-American honors in the all-around and on the uneven bars.

At the Pac-12 Championships, Ross won the all-around and uneven bars titles to help UCLA win the team title. She then finished fourth in the all-around at the NCAA Championships to help UCLA qualify for the Super Six. She also finished second on the balance beam behind teammate Peng-Peng Lee and third on the uneven bars. In the Super Six, Ross contributed scores of 9.9875 on balance beam and 9.950 on uneven bars to help UCLA win its first national team title since 2010.

=== 2019 ===
Ross helped UCLA win its first meet of the season, the Collegiate Challenge, by tying her career-high all-around score 39.700 and receiving a perfect 10 on the uneven bars. She scored her second perfect 10 of the season on the uneven bars to help UCLA defeat Oregon State. On February 10, Ross earned her first-ever perfect 10 on vault in UCLA's win at Washington. The next week against Arizona, she repeated the perfect 10 on vault and scored a career-high 39.850 in the all-around. She earned a perfect 10 for the third consecutive week, this time on the uneven bars, in a win against Utah. UCLA then lost its first meet of the year to Oklahoma, but Ross recorded perfect 10s on the vault and uneven bars. She then earned her first perfect 10 on the balance beam of the season in a win against Stanford. Then on March 16, Ross completed a "Gym Slam" after earning her first-ever perfect 10 on floor exercise in a win against Utah State. She was named Pac-12 Gymnast of Week for six consecutive weeks. She finished the regular season ranked first in the country in the all-around, vault, and uneven bars, and she was the only gymnast in the country to earn first-team All-American honors in the all-around and on all four events.

At the Pac-12 Championships, Ross scored a perfect 10 on both the uneven bars and floor exercise to win both event titles. She also defended her all-around title and led UCLA to the team title. She was then named the Pac-12 Gymnast of the Year. Having scored a second perfect 10 on the floor, Ross became the second gymnast ever to record two Gym Slams (having scored at least two perfect 10s on each apparatus), after Maggie Nichols did so in 2018.

In the NCAA Regionals semifinal, Ross led the team to advance to the Regional finals and scored a perfect 10 on the vault. Then in the finals, Ross earned perfect 10s on the uneven bars and balance beam and UCLA qualified for the NCAA Championships. With her perfect 10 on the balance beam, Ross became the first gymnast to complete two Gym Slams within a single season. During the 2019 season, Ross set the NCAA record for the most perfect 10s in one season with 14. She also set the NCAA record for most consecutive meets with a perfect 10 with 10 straight meets. At the NCAA Championships, Ross scored a 9.950 on both vault and floor, making her co-champion in each event. She became the second NCAA gymnast to be a national champion in each event after Courtney Kupets. However, she missed out on the all-around title after a step on her dismount off the uneven bars, finishing second to Nichols. In the first Four on the Floor finals, she scored a 9.950 on both vault and bars, a 9.925 on beam, and a 9.9125 on floor. Her scores contributed to a third-place finish for UCLA after the team struggled on beam and floor. She was named a finalist for the Honda Sports Award, losing to Nichols.

=== 2020 ===
Ross helped UCLA finish second to Oklahoma in the opening meet of the season, the Collegiate Challenge. Individually, Ross finished first in the all-around, beating the reigning NCAA all-around champion Maggie Nichols. On January 12, at a meet against Boise State, Ross earned a perfect 10 on uneven bars, her first of the 2020 season and her first perfect 10 on the apparatus at Pauley Pavilion. Furthermore, Ross finished first in the all-around for the second week in a row; she also won the meet titles for the uneven bars and floor exercise. Then on January 18, Ross received a perfect 10 on uneven bars for the second meet in a row at a tri-meet against BYU and Utah State. On March 8, Ross recorded her first perfect 10 on vault for the season in a win over California. This was the 22nd and final perfect 10 of her career, and as of 2024, Ross is tied with Nichols for the fifth-most perfect 10s in NCAA gymnastics history.

The 2019–20 season was cut short due to the COVID-19 pandemic, which prompted the NCAA and Pac-12 to cancel all regular season and championship events. This decision effectively ended Ross's gymnastics career. In April, Ross was awarded the Honda Sports Award for gymnastics, beating out finalists Nichols, Lexy Ramler, and Trinity Thomas. Additionally, Ross was named Pac-12 Gymnast of the Year for the second season in a row and finished the season undefeated in the all-around for the eight appearances she made. She was also named the Daily Bruin UCLA Athlete of the Year. Additionally, Ross was nominated for both the AAI Award and the James E. Sullivan Award.

=== Career Perfect 10.0 ===
Kyla Ross' Perfect 10 Scores
Season	Date	Event	Meet
2017	January 28, 2017	Uneven bars	UCLA @ Oregon State
2017	February 18, 2017	Uneven bars	UCLA @ Utah
2017	February 20, 2017	Balance beam	UCLA vs Bridgeport and Utah State
2017	March 18, 2017	Balance beam	2017 Pac-12 Championships
2018	March 11, 2018	Uneven bars	UCLA @ Stanford
2019	January 12, 2019	Uneven bars	Collegiate Challenge
2019	February 2, 2019	Uneven bars	UCLA @ Oregon State
2019	February 10, 2019	Vault	UCLA @ Washington
2019	February 16, 2019	Vault	UCLA vs Arizona
2019	February 23, 2019	Uneven bars	UCLA @ Utah
2019	March 3, 2019	Vault	UCLA @ Oklahoma
2019	March 3, 2019	Uneven bars	UCLA @ Oklahoma
2019	March 10, 2019	Balance beam	UCLA vs Stanford
2019	March 16, 2019	Floor exercise	UCLA vs Utah State
2019	March 23, 2019	Uneven bars	2019 Pac-12 Championships
2019	March 23, 2019	Floor exercise	2019 Pac-12 Championships
2019	April 5, 2019	Vault	Michigan Regional semifinal
2019	April 6, 2019	Uneven bars	Michigan Regional Final
2019	April 6, 2019	Balance beam	Michigan Regional Final
2020	January 12, 2020	Uneven bars	UCLA vs Boise State
2020	January 18, 2020	Uneven bars	UCLA, Utah State @ BYU
2020	March 8, 2020	Vault	UCLA vs California

== Coaching career ==
For the 2020–21 season Ross remained at UCLA to finish her degree in molecular, cell, and developmental biology. She joined the UCLA coaching staff as an Undergraduate Assistant Coach. On August 13, 2021, the University of Arkansas announced that Ross would join the coaching staff as the volunteer assistant coach for the 2021–22 season, coaching alongside her 2012 Olympic teammate Jordyn Wieber and her former UCLA teammate Felicia Hano. In July 2022, she was promoted to assistant coach. In June 2026, Ross was promoted to associate head coach.

== Personal life ==
On August 16, 2018, Ross came forward as a survivor of Larry Nassar's sexual abuse alongside fellow Olympian and UCLA teammate Madison Kocian. Kocian and Ross both filed civil lawsuits against USA Gymnastics, Michigan State University, and the United States Olympic & Paralympic Committee. All three entities settled their lawsuits related to Nassar's abuse and paid his victims.

On June 29, 2024, Ross married former UCLA Bruins football player Justin Rittman.

== Competitive history ==
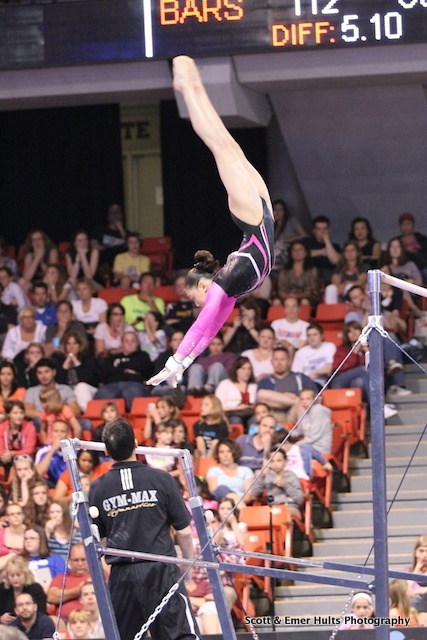
Ross on the uneven bars at the 2012 U.S. Classic

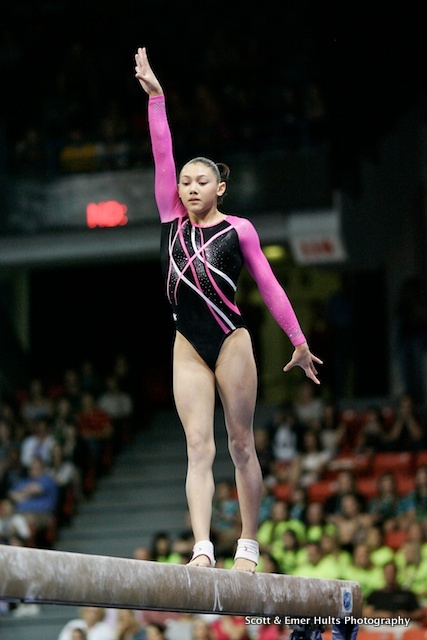
Kyla Ross on the balance beam at the 2012 U.S. Classic

Competitive history of Kyla Ross at the junior elite level
Year	Event	Team	AA	VT	UB	BB	FX
2009	American Classic		2nd place, silver medalist(s)	3rd place, bronze medalist(s)	10	1st place, gold medalist(s)	3rd place, bronze medalist(s)
2009	U.S. Classic		1st place, gold medalist(s)	1st place, gold medalist(s)	5		5
2009	U.S. National Championships		1st place, gold medalist(s)	1st place, gold medalist(s)	12	1st place, gold medalist(s)	3rd place, bronze medalist(s)
2009	Pan American Championships	1st place, gold medalist(s)	1st place, gold medalist(s)		1st place, gold medalist(s)	1st place, gold medalist(s)	2nd place, silver medalist(s)
2010	City of Jesolo Trophy		2nd place, silver medalist(s)				
2010	Pacific Rim Championships	1st place, gold medalist(s)	2nd place, silver medalist(s)	1st place, gold medalist(s)	2nd place, silver medalist(s)		2nd place, silver medalist(s)
2010	U.S. Classic		3rd place, bronze medalist(s)	4	4	1st place, gold medalist(s)	8
2010	U.S. National Championships		1st place, gold medalist(s)	3rd place, bronze medalist(s)	7	1st place, gold medalist(s)	3rd place, bronze medalist(s)
2010	Pan American Championships	1st place, gold medalist(s)	1st place, gold medalist(s)		6		2nd place, silver medalist(s)
2011	City of Jesolo Trophy	1st place, gold medalist(s)	1st place, gold medalist(s)	2nd place, silver medalist(s)	2nd place, silver medalist(s)	1st place, gold medalist(s)	7
2011	U.S. Classic		1st place, gold medalist(s)	2nd place, silver medalist(s)	1st place, gold medalist(s)	4	3rd place, bronze medalist(s)
2011	U.S. National Championships		2nd place, silver medalist(s)	3rd place, bronze medalist(s)	2nd place, silver medalist(s)	2nd place, silver medalist(s)	6

Competitive history of Kyla Ross at the senior elite level
Year	Event	Team	AA	VT	UB	BB	FX
2012	Pacific Rim Championships	1st place, gold medalist(s)	2nd place, silver medalist(s)		2nd place, silver medalist(s)	1st place, gold medalist(s)	3rd place, bronze medalist(s)
2012	City of Jesolo Trophy	1st place, gold medalist(s)	1st place, gold medalist(s)				
2012	U.S. Classic		2nd place, silver medalist(s)	4	2nd place, silver medalist(s)	5	5
2012	U.S. National Championships		4		2nd place, silver medalist(s)	4	6
2012	U.S. Olympic Trials		5		1st place, gold medalist(s)	3rd place, bronze medalist(s)	9
2012	Olympic Games	1st place, gold medalist(s)			R2		
2013	City of Jesolo Trophy	1st place, gold medalist(s)	2nd place, silver medalist(s)	2nd place, silver medalist(s)		1st place, gold medalist(s)	
2013	U.S. Classic		1st place, gold medalist(s)		1st place, gold medalist(s)	2nd place, silver medalist(s)	12
2013	U.S. National Championships		2nd place, silver medalist(s)		1st place, gold medalist(s)	1st place, gold medalist(s)	7
2013	World Championships		2nd place, silver medalist(s)		2nd place, silver medalist(s)	2nd place, silver medalist(s)	5
2014	City of Jesolo Trophy	1st place, gold medalist(s)	1st place, gold medalist(s)		2nd place, silver medalist(s)	6	2nd place, silver medalist(s)
2014	Pacific Rim Championships	1st place, gold medalist(s)	2nd place, silver medalist(s)		2nd place, silver medalist(s)	1st place, gold medalist(s)	2nd place, silver medalist(s)
2014	U.S. Classic		2nd place, silver medalist(s)		3rd place, bronze medalist(s)	1st place, gold medalist(s)	2nd place, silver medalist(s)
2014	U.S. National Championships		2nd place, silver medalist(s)		6	1st place, gold medalist(s)	5
2014	World Championships	1st place, gold medalist(s)	3rd place, bronze medalist(s)			6	
2015	City of Jesolo Trophy	1st place, gold medalist(s)			1st place, gold medalist(s)		
2015	U.S. Classic				15	4	
2015	U.S. National Championships		10		12	3rd place, bronze medalist(s)	12

Competitive history of Kyla Ross at the NCAA level
Year	Event	Team	AA	VT	UB	BB	FX
2017	PAC-12 Championships	3rd place, bronze medalist(s)		12	6	1st place, gold medalist(s)	
2017	NCAA Championships	4	6		1st place, gold medalist(s)	1st place, gold medalist(s)	
2018	PAC-12 Championships	1st place, gold medalist(s)	1st place, gold medalist(s)	3rd place, bronze medalist(s)	1st place, gold medalist(s)	2nd place, silver medalist(s)	10
2018	NCAA Championships	1st place, gold medalist(s)	4		3rd place, bronze medalist(s)	2nd place, silver medalist(s)	
2019	PAC-12 Championships	1st place, gold medalist(s)	1st place, gold medalist(s)	3rd place, bronze medalist(s)	1st place, gold medalist(s)	3rd place, bronze medalist(s)	1st place, gold medalist(s)
2019	NCAA Championships	3rd place, bronze medalist(s)	2nd place, silver medalist(s)	1st place, gold medalist(s)	26	6	1st place, gold medalist(s)
2020	PAC-12 Championships	Canceled due to the COVID-19 pandemic in the USA					
2020	NCAA Championships	Canceled due to the COVID-19 pandemic in the USA					

== Awards and honors ==
List of awards won by Kyla Ross
Year	Award	Result	Ref
2013	Longines Prize for Elegance	Won	
2017	Pac-12 Freshman of the Year (gymnastics)	Won	
2019	Pac-12 Gymnast of the Year	Won	
2019	Honda Sports Award (gymnastics)	Nominated	
2020	Pac-12 Gymnast of the Year	Won	
2020	Daily Bruin UCLA Athlete of the Year	Won	
2020	Honda Sports Award (gymnastics)	Won	
2020	AAI Award	Nominated	
2020	AAU James E. Sullivan Award	Nominated	

Awards
Preceded by Maggie Nichols	Honda Sports Award (gymnastics); 2020	Succeeded by Anastasia Webb
