= Katelyn Ohashi =

American gymnast

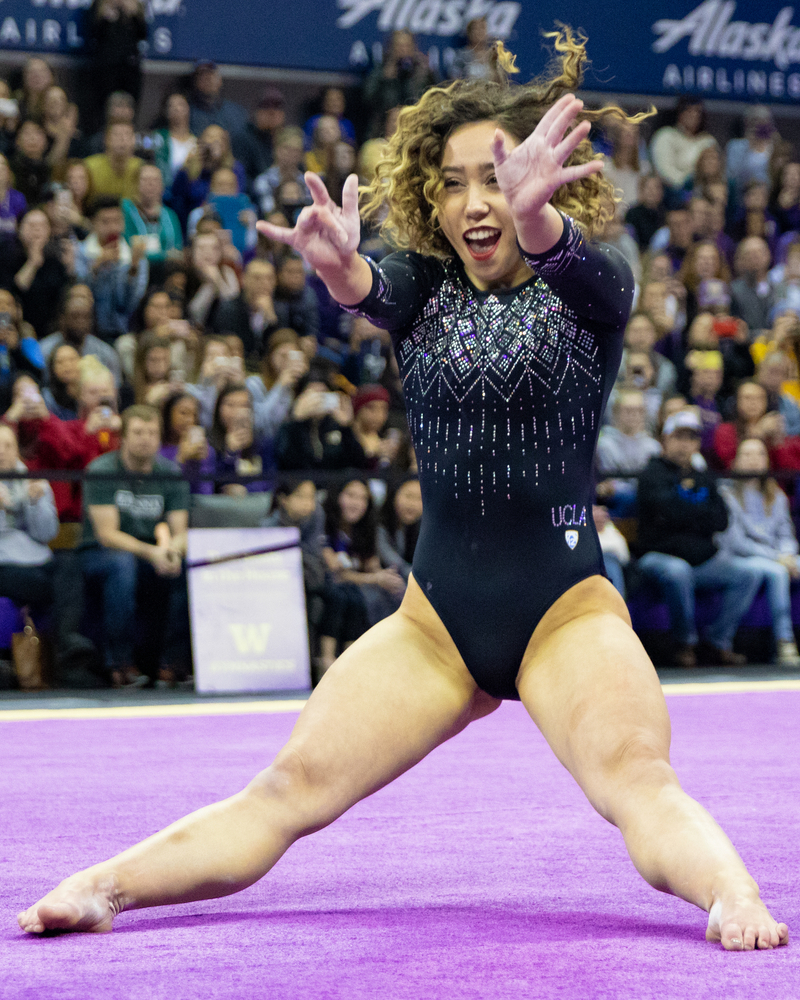
- Ohashi in 2019

Personal information
- Born: April 12, 1997 (age 29) Seattle, Washington, U.S.
- Height: 4 ft 10 in (147 cm)

Gymnastics career
- Discipline: Women's artistic gymnastics
- Country represented: United States; (2009–2013)
- College team: UCLA Bruins (2016–19)
- Club: Pacific Reign (2026–); WOGA (2009–2015); GAGE (2006–2009)
- Head coaches: Cale Robinson; Stephanie Gentry
- Former coaches: Al Fong (GAGE); Valeri Liukin (WOGA); Laurent Landi; Valorie Kondos Field; Chris Waller; Randy Lane; Jordyn Wieber
- Choreographer: Antonia Marakova
Medal record
Representing United States
Jr. Pacific Rim Championships
Gold medal – first place	2012 Seattle	Team
Gold medal – first place	2012 Seattle	All-Around
Gold medal – first place	2012 Seattle	Uneven Bars
Gold medal – first place	2012 Seattle	Balance Beam
Gold medal – first place	2012 Seattle	Floor Exercise
FIG World Cup
Gold medal – first place	2013 Worcester	All-Around
Representing UCLA Bruins
NCAA Championships
Gold medal – first place	2018 St Louis	Team
Gold medal – first place	2018 St Louis	Floor Exercise
Bronze medal – third place	2019 Fort Worth	Team
Bronze medal – third place	2019 Fort Worth	Balance Beam

Katelyn Michelle Ohashi (born April 12, 1997) is an American gymnast who competed for the University of California, Los Angeles. She is a six-time All-American and a four-time member of USA Gymnastics' Junior National Team. She was the 2011 junior national champion and won the 2013 American Cup. Noted for incorporating popular dance elements in her floor routines, she trended globally on various social media networks in January 2019 for her perfect 10 score at the 2019 Collegiate Challenge, the fourth perfect-10 floor routine of her career.

== Early life and education ==
Ohashi was born in Seattle, Washington, to Richard and Diana Ohashi, the latter a former high-school gymnast. She has three older brothers, Ryan, Kyle, and Kalen, and is of German and Japanese descent.

Ohashi started gymnastics at age 3. To support her gymnastics training, Ohashi moved in 2006 to Kansas City, Missouri, with her mother and the youngest of her brothers; three years later, they moved to Plano, Texas.

She attended Spring Creek Academy, then graduated from Plano Senior High School in 2015. In the fall of 2015, she began attending the University of California, Los Angeles, where she majored in gender studies and graduated in 2019.

== Gymnastics career ==
=== 2009–2012: Junior elite ===
Early in her career, Ohashi trained with Al Fong at Great American Gymnastics Express (GAGE) in Blue Springs, Missouri. At age 12, she debuted on the national gymnastics scene at the 2009 Junior Olympic National Championships, where she placed first on floor exercise, tied for second on uneven bars, placed fourth in the all-around, and tied for seventh on vault.

She competed in her first elite meet at the 2009 U.S. Classic where she placed fourth on floor exercise in the junior division, tied for fifth on balance beam and placed ninth in the all-around. This qualified her for the National Championships, where she won the silver medal on floor exercise, placed sixth on balance beam, placed tenth in the all-around; as a result she was named to the junior national team. Soon after the National Championships, Ohashi moved to Plano, Texas, to train at WOGA.

In the junior division of the 2010 U.S. Classic, Ohashi won the silver medal in the all-around and on uneven bars, balance beam, and floor exercise. At the 2010 U.S. National Championships, Ohashi placed second in the all-around behind Kyla Ross. She placed first on uneven bars, tied for fourth on floor exercise, placed fifth on balance beam and seventh on vault. At the 2010 Bumbo Cup in Pretoria, South Africa, Ohashi captured the junior-division gold medals in the all-around, floor exercise, and vault, along with silver medals on uneven bars and balance beam.

In the junior division at the 2011 City of Jesolo Trophy, Ohashi helped the U.S. win the team competition and won an individual gold medal on floor exercise. She tied for silver on the uneven bars and placed third in the all-around, fourth on balance beam and fifth on vault. At the 2011 U.S. Classic, she won the silver medal on balance beam with a score of 14.95, and tied for fifth on vault. At the 2011 U.S. National Championships, she won the junior all-around title with a total score of 120.95 over two nights, beating defending champion Kyla Ross.

Ohashi began 2012 competing at the 2012 Pacific Rim Championships where she won gold in the all-around and on uneven bars, balance beam, and floor exercise. At the 2012 City of Jesolo Trophy, Ohashi won gold with team USA and individually won gold on uneven bars and balance beam. At the 2012 U.S. National Championships, Ohashi placed fifth in the all-around.

=== 2013–2014: Senior elite ===
Ohashi became age-eligible for senior level competition in 2013. She made her debut at the 2013 American Cup, where she won the all-around title, defeating U.S. teammate Simone Biles. In April, she underwent shoulder surgery which prevented her from competing for the rest of the year.

In an interview at the 2014 WOGA Classic, Ohashi said she was unsure of her ability to continue at the international elite level after her injury. Later in the year, she suffered from two torn shoulders and a spine injury that required surgery, and did not compete again until 2015.

=== 2015: Level 10 ===
In 2015, Ohashi dropped from elite competition back to Level 10. Her first competition since 2013 was the Texas Prime Meet, where she performed only on vault, balance beam, and floor exercise.

Ohashi competed at the 2015 Pikes Peak Cup in Colorado Springs on February 6. She placed 17th in the all-around competing on three events instead of four, and finished second in the vault event final with a score of 9.850. She then competed at the 2015 WOGA Classic on February 14 and placed 14th overall, competing in only three events. On February 20, she competed at the Legends Invitational in Los Angeles, where she placed 13th in the all-around and second on vault.

=== 2016–2019: NCAA ===
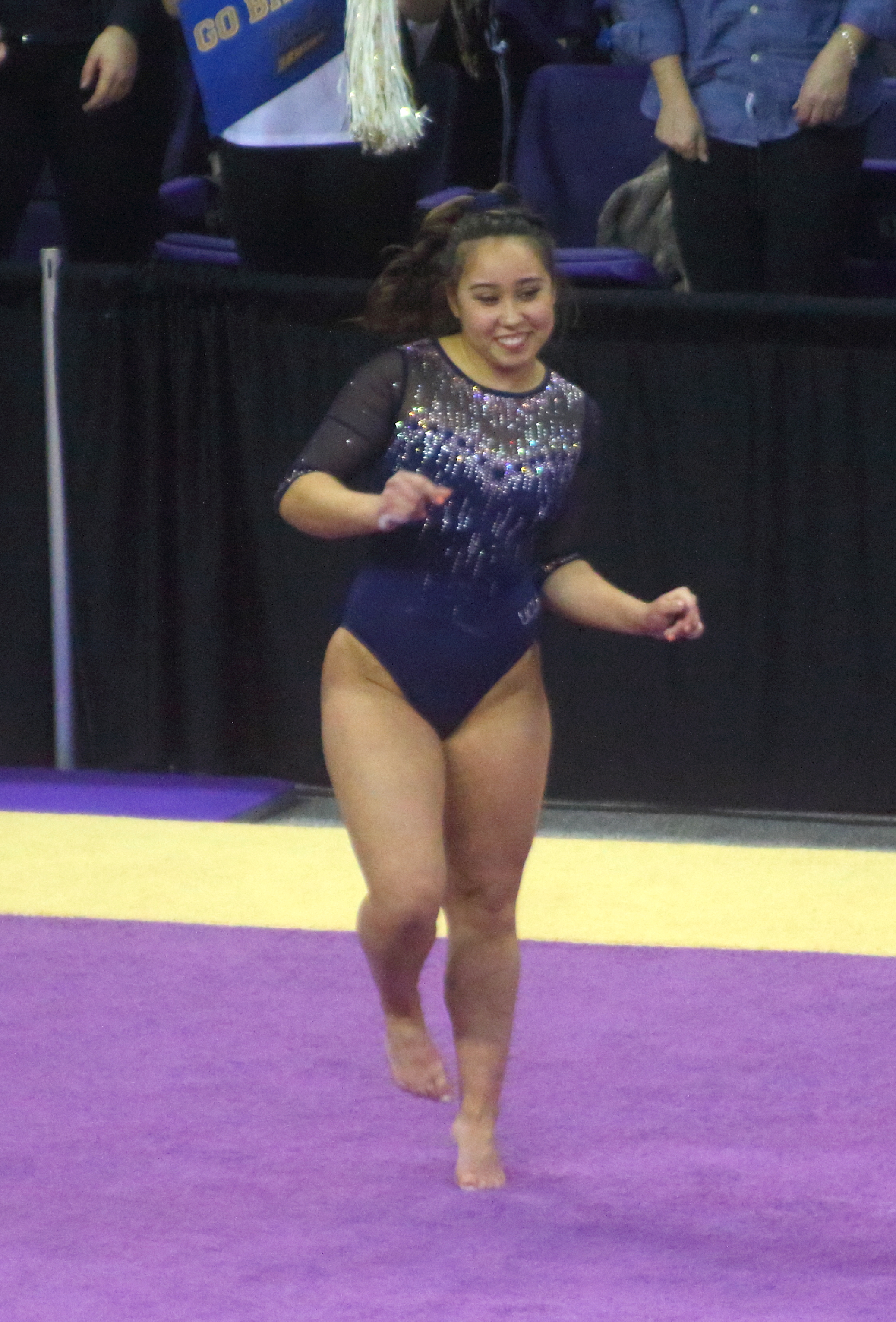
Ohashi in March 2016

Ohashi joined the UCLA Bruins gymnastics team for the 2015–2016 season and was the Pac-12 Freshman of the Week four times. In a meet against the Arizona Wildcats, the cap of Ohashi's balance beam fell off, causing her to land on her neck upon dismount. She sustained a sternal fracture, an injury that kept her out for four weeks.

For the 2016–2017 season, Ohashi finished the regular season ranked No. 1 on balance beam and received two perfect 10s.

In the 2017–2018 season, Ohashi improved upon her performances from the previous season. She captured three perfect 10s on floor exercise, the first of her career, and set career highs on the uneven bars, vault and the all-around. She finished the regular season ranked first on floor exercise and third on balance beam, and was named the PAC-12 specialist of the year. At the 2018 NCAA National Championships, she competed on balance beam and floor exercise, placing fourth on balance beam and winning the floor exercise title, her first national championship win. At the Super Six final, Ohashi scored a pair of 9.95s on balance beam and floor exercise, helping UCLA win the team title.

At the 2019 Collegiate Challenge, Ohashi earned a perfect 10 for a floor exercise routine to an R&B-and-pop-hits medley that she was performing for the second time; video of her routine was shared widely on social media. At the 2019 NCAA Championships, Ohashi placed third on balance beam and helped UCLA finish third overall as a team.

Ohashi graduated from UCLA in 2019 with a degree in gender studies.

=== 2020–2024: Post-collegiate ===
During the COVID-19 pandemic, Ohashi began writing poetry. In September 2020, Ohashi appeared in a television commercial to promote the Toyota GR Yaris. In the advertisement, Ohashi is seen tumbling down Riebeek Street in Cape Town before leaping into the air before coming back down in a Yaris.

In May 2021, Ohashi wrote, directed, and produced BEaUtifully Molded, a spoken-word piece and its accompanying visual project that focuses on body positivity, self-expression, and unlearning the pressures of societal beauty standards.

In the fall of 2021, Ohashi participated in Simone Biles' Gold Over America Tour. She participated in the 2024 edition of the tour as well.

=== 2026–present: Return to elite gymnastics ===
"After a few years of contemplating whether I wanted to continue chasing a dream I had as a little kid, I have decided to go for it. I'm taking it one day at a time; one skill, one event, one dream."

— Ohashi via Instagram

On June 23, 2026, Ohashi announced that she would return to gymnastics competition at the age of 29. Training at Pacific Reign, she made her elite comeback at the 2026 American Classic, where she placed third on balance beam with a score of 13.150; she also earned a score of 11.500 on floor exercise. Ohashi next competed at the 2026 U.S. Classic, scoring 13.200 on both balance beam and floor exercise. Her combined score of 26.400 did not meet the two-event threshold of 26.800 required to qualify for the 2026 National Championships.

== Personal life ==
Ohashi has spoken openly about her struggles with an eating disorder. She has received mental-health counseling, which she reports as being "crucial in my growing as a person and my mental health."

In 2017, she was diagnosed with ulcerative colitis.

== Competitive history ==
Competitive history of Katelyn Ohashi at the junior level
Year	Event	Team	AA	VT	UB	BB	FX
2009	U.S. Classic		9	18	15	5	4
2009	U.S. National Championships		10	22	20	6	2nd place, silver medalist(s)
2010	U.S. Classic		2nd place, silver medalist(s)	8	2nd place, silver medalist(s)	2nd place, silver medalist(s)	3rd place, bronze medalist(s)
2010	U.S. National Championships		2nd place, silver medalist(s)	7	1st place, gold medalist(s)	5	4
2010	Bumbo Classic		1st place, gold medalist(s)	1st place, gold medalist(s)	2nd place, silver medalist(s)	2nd place, silver medalist(s)	1st place, gold medalist(s)
2011	City of Jesolo Trophy	1st place, gold medalist(s)	3rd place, bronze medalist(s)	5	2nd place, silver medalist(s)	4	1st place, gold medalist(s)
2011	U.S. Classic		3rd place, bronze medalist(s)	5	1st place, gold medalist(s)	2nd place, silver medalist(s)	9
2011	U.S. National Championships		1st place, gold medalist(s)	4	1st place, gold medalist(s)	1st place, gold medalist(s)	1st place, gold medalist(s)
2012	Pacific Rim Championships	1st place, gold medalist(s)	1st place, gold medalist(s)		1st place, gold medalist(s)	1st place, gold medalist(s)	1st place, gold medalist(s)
2012	City of Jesolo Trophy	1st place, gold medalist(s)			1st place, gold medalist(s)	1st place, gold medalist(s)	
2012	U.S. Classic				1st place, gold medalist(s)	8	
2012	U.S. National Championships		5	11	1st place, gold medalist(s)	2nd place, silver medalist(s)	2nd place, silver medalist(s)

Competitive history of Katelyn Ohashi at the senior level
Year	Event	Team	AA	VT	UB	BB	FX
2013	American Cup		1st place, gold medalist(s)				
2026	American Classic					3rd place, bronze medalist(s)	11
2026	U.S. Classic					6	7

Competitive history of Katelyn Ohashi at the NCAA level
Year	Event	Team	AA	VT	UB	BB	FX
2016	PAC-12 Championships	1st place, gold medalist(s)				7	
2016	NCAA Championships	5					
2017	PAC-12 Championships	3rd place, bronze medalist(s)				2nd place, silver medalist(s)	
2017	NCAA Championships	4				8	
2018	PAC-12 Championships	1st place, gold medalist(s)				3rd place, bronze medalist(s)	1st place, gold medalist(s)
2018	NCAA Championships	1st place, gold medalist(s)				4	1st place, gold medalist(s)
2019	PAC-12 Championships	1st place, gold medalist(s)				1st place, gold medalist(s)	1st place, gold medalist(s)
2019	NCAA Championships	3rd place, bronze medalist(s)				3rd place, bronze medalist(s)	7

== Collegiate stats ==
=== Career perfect 10.0 ===
Season	Date	Event	Meet
2017	March 5, 2017	Balance Beam	UCLA vs UC Berkeley
2017	March 12, 2017	Balance Beam	UCLA vs UNC
2018	February 4, 2018	Floor Exercise	UCLA vs Oklahoma
2018	February 25, 2018	Floor Exercise	UCLA vs Oregon State
2018	March 13, 2018	Floor Exercise	UCLA vs San Jose State
2019	January 12, 2019	Floor Exercise	Collegiate Challenge
2019	February 10, 2019	Floor Exercise	UCLA @ Washington
2019	February 16, 2019	Floor Exercise	UCLA vs Arizona
2019	March 3, 2019	Floor Exercise	UCLA @ Oklahoma
2019	March 17, 2019	Floor Exercise	UCLA vs Utah State
2019	March 23, 2019	Floor Exercise	2019 Pac-12 Championship

=== Regular season ranking ===
Season	All-Around	Vault	Uneven Bars	Balance Beam	Floor Exercise
2016	N/A	N/A	N/A	53rd	151st
2017	N/A	N/A	N/A	1st	49th
2018	N/A	N/A	52nd	3rd	1st
2019	N/A	N/A	N/A	2nd	1st

== Floor music ==
Year	Music Title
2010–2012	Onegin's Theme
2013	Ya Habibi, Always by Aysel and Arash

== Filmography ==
Year	Title	Role	Notes
2022	Gymnastics Academy: A Second Chance	Herself	Episode: "All in this together"
2023	Bunk'd	Herself	Episode: "Coop D'etat"
