= 2009 Junior Pan American Artistic Gymnastics Championships =

International sports competition

Junior Pan American Artistic Gymnastics Championships
- Location: Aracaju, Brazil
- Date: November 6–8, 2009

The 2009 Junior Pan American Artistic Gymnastics Championships was held in Aracaju, Brazil, November 6–8, 2009.

== Medal summary ==
Event	Gold	Silver	Bronze
Women
Team	United States; Bridgette Caquatto; Aly Raisman; Kyla Ross; Sabrina Vega	Canada; Madeline Gardiner; Dominique Pegg; Anysia Unick	Brazil; Ana Carolina Cardoso; Leticia Costa; Harumy de Freitas; Nadhine Ourives
All Around	Kyla Ross (USA)	Sabrina Vega (USA)	Aly Raisman (USA)
Vault	Aly Raisman (USA)	Bridgette Caquatto (USA)	Dominique Pegg (CAN)
Uneven bars	Kyla Ross (USA)	Sabrina Vega (USA)	Monica Yool (GUA)
Balance beam	Kyla Ross (USA)	Ana Sofía Gómez (GUA)	Anysia Unick (CAN)
Floor exercise	Aly Raisman (USA)	Kyla Ross (USA)	Karla Salazar (MEX)
Men
Team	Brazil; Petrix Barbosa; Arthur Mariano; Sérgio Sasaki; Caio Souza	United States; Jesse Glenn; Christopher Maestas; Larry Martin; Sam Mikulak	Colombia; Jossimar Calvo; Didier Lugo; Johnny Muñoz; Javier Sandoval
All Around	Sérgio Sasaki (BRA)	Christopher Maestas (USA)	Petrix Barbosa (BRA)
Floor exercise	Sérgio Sasaki (BRA)	Sam Mikulak (USA)	Ernesto Vila Sarria (CUB)
Pommel horse	Johnny Muñoz (COL)	Christopher Maestas (USA)	Didier Lugo (COL)
Rings	Christopher Maestas (USA)	Petrix Barbosa (BRA)	Sérgio Sasaki (BRA)
Vault	Sérgio Sasaki (BRA)	Petrix Barbosa (BRA)	Sam Mikulak (USA)
Parallel bars	Sérgio Sasaki (BRA)	Christopher Maestas (USA)	Jossimar Calvo (COL)
Horizontal bar	Petrix Barbosa (BRA)	Jossimar Calvo (COL)	Rodolfo Bonilla (MEX)

== Medal table ==
Rank	Nation	Gold	Silver	Bronze	Total
1	United States (USA)	7	9	2	18
2	Brazil (BRA)	6	2	3	11
3	Colombia (COL)	1	1	3	5
4	Canada (CAN)	0	1	2	3
5	Guatemala (GUA)	0	1	1	2
6	Mexico (MEX)	0	0	2	2
7	Cuba (CUB)	0	0	1	1
Totals (7 entries)		14	14	14	42
