= Sabrina Vega =

American gymnast

- Nickname: Sabby
- Born: May 24, 1995 (age 31) Carmel, New York, U.S.
- Height: 5 ft 1 in (155 cm)

Gymnastics career
- Discipline: Women's artistic gymnastics
- Country represented: United States; (2008–2012)
- College team: Georgia GymDogs
- Club: Great American Gymnastics Express
- Head coaches: Al Fong and Armine Barutyan Fong
- Former coaches: Sorin Cepoi; Teodora Ungureanu
- Retired: October 3, 2015 (elite), April 3, 2020 (NCAA)
Medal record
Women's artistic gymnastics
Representing United States
World Championships
Gold medal – first place	2011 Tokyo	Team
Pacific Rim Championships
Gold medal – first place	2010 Melbourne	Team
Silver medal – second place	2010 Melbourne	Balance Beam
Pan American Championships
Gold medal – first place	2010 Guadalajara	Team
Gold medal – first place	2010 Guadalajara	Balance Beam
Silver medal – second place	2010 Guadalajara	All-Around
- Website: www.sabrinavega.com

Sabrina Vega (born May 24, 1995) is a retired American gymnast from Carmel, New York. She was a five-time national team member and a member of the United States team that won gold at the 2011 World Artistic Gymnastics Championships. She later competed for the University of Georgia from 2017 to 2020.

== Personal life ==
Vega was born to David Vega, a former gymnast, and Jahaira Vega. Her younger brother, David Jr., plays baseball and football. She began gymnastics in 2000 and trained at Dynamic Gymnastics in Mohegan Lake, New York, until 2013, when she switched gyms to train at Great American Gymnastics Express.

In 2018, Vega filed a lawsuit against Béla and Marta Károlyi, USA Gymnastics, and the United States Olympic Committee for the abuse she suffered at the hands of Larry Nassar, the former national team doctor. She was one of more than 300 women and girls who were victims of Nassar's abuse.

== Elite career ==
In 2009, Vega competed at the United States Junior National Championships in Dallas, Texas. She won gold on the floor exercise and bronze on balance beam, and finished fourth in the all-around. She then competed at the 2009 Junior Pan American Championships in Aracaju, Brazil, where she helped the United States team win the gold medal. Individually, she won silver medals in the all-around and on uneven bars behind teammate Kyla Ross.

In her first major meet as a senior, the 2011 CoverGirl Classic in Chicago, Vega placed third in the all-around (scoring 56.85), second on floor (14.25), and fourth on vault (14.6). That August, she placed fifth in the all-around at the 2011 U.S. National Championships in St. Paul, Minnesota, with a two-night score of 112.05. She earned fourth place on floor exercise (28.9) and fifth place on beam (28.85), and was named to the Worlds team along with Alicia Sacramone, Gabby Douglas, McKayla Maroney, Aly Raisman, and Jordyn Wieber. The United States went on to win gold in the team final, where Vega competed on bars and beam.

At the 2012 Olympic Trials, Vega finished 10th in the all-around and was not named to the Olympic team.

She did not train in 2013, but resumed training in mid-2014 and attended a U.S. training camp in November 2014.

At the 2015 U.S. Classic, Vega returned to elite competition for the first time since 2012 after transferring to GAGE, where she trained under Al Fong and Armine Barutyan-Fong alongside new teammates Brenna Dowell and Madison Desch. She scored a 0 on bars, performing only an exhibition routine. She had a subpar beam routine with a 5.6 start value and scored 12.500 to finish 14th on the event. On floor, she had a fall and scored 13.200, finishing 11th.

On October 3, 2015, Vega announced that she had retired from elite gymnastics and accepted a scholarship to the University of Georgia to compete in NCAA gymnastics for the Georgia Gym Dogs.

== NCAA career ==
=== 2017 (Freshman) ===
Vega competed beam and floor consistently throughout the season, with season highs of 9.9 and 9.95, respectively. Georgia qualified for the NCAA Women's Gymnastics Championships, where it placed 12th.

=== 2018 (Sophomore) ===
Vega competed beam and floor at every meet and vault at all but one, earned first-team All-American honors on floor, earned SEC Specialist of the Week, and repeatedly led the team on floor. At the 2018 Tuscaloosa Regional, Georgia came in ranked 18th and was not favored to advance to the NCAA Championships. However, the higher-ranked Michigan team struggled and Vega hit the final routine of the day for Georgia, scoring 9.875 on beam. Georgia edged out Illinois by 0.075 to qualify to Nationals, where it finished 7th, just missing a spot in the finals.

=== 2019 (Junior) ===
Entering her junior year as a team leader, Vega was named SEC Specialist of the Year and earned regular season first-team All-American honors on beam and second-team honors on floor. She competed on vault, beam, and floor in every meet. Georgia again qualified for Nationals, where it placed 8th.

=== 2020 (Senior) ===
In her final season, Vega added bars to her program and competed all four events for the first time since 2012. The season was cut short due to the COVID-19 pandemic, but she finished ranked in the top 20 nationally on beam and the top 10 nationally on floor, and "was Georgia’s leading scorer five times on beam, nine times on floor, and three times in the all-around," according to the UGA athletics department. She earned regular season All-American honors and two SEC Specialist of the Week awards, while landing among the ESPN Top 10 "Should Go Viral" floor routines. She was nominated for the AAI Award, "widely considered the Heisman Trophy of women’s gymnastics."

Vega was also a strong student at Georgia, majoring in biology and minoring in public health, with the goal of attending medical school.
