= Brenna Dowell =

American artistic gymnast

- Born: March 4, 1996 (age 30) Kansas City, Missouri, U.S.
- Height: 5 ft 3 in (160 cm)

Gymnastics career
- Discipline: Women's artistic gymnastics
- Country represented: United States; (2011–2017)
- College team: Oklahoma Sooners (2015, 2017–2019)
- Club: Great American Gymnastics Express
- Head coach: Al Fong
- Eponymous skills: The Dowell (FX) Piked Double Front salto
- Retired: April 25, 2019
Medal record
Women's gymnastics
Representing United States
World Championships
Gold medal – first place	2015 Glasgow	Team
Pacific Rim Championships
Gold medal – first place	2016 Everett	Team
Silver medal – second place	2016 Everett	Floor Exercise
Pan American Championships
Gold medal – first place	2010 Guadalajara	Team
FIG World Cup
Event / 1st / 2nd / 3rd; All-Around World Cup / 0 / 1 / 0
Representing Oklahoma Sooners
NCAA Championships
Gold medal – first place	2017 St. Louis	Team
Gold medal – first place	2018 St. Louis	Vault
Gold medal – first place	2019 Fort Worth	Team
Gold medal – first place	2019 Fort Worth	Floor Exercise
Silver medal – second place	2015 Fort Worth	Floor Exercise
Silver medal – second place	2018 St. Louis	Team
Bronze medal – third place	2015 Fort Worth	Team

Brenna Dowell (born March 4, 1996) is an American former artistic gymnast. She was a member of the gold medal-winning team at the 2015 World Championships. She competed collegiately for the Oklahoma Sooners where she was a four-time national champion.

== Personal life ==
Dowell was born in Kansas City, Missouri, in 1996 to Michael and Carole Dowell. Dowell began gymnastics in 1997 after her mother enrolled her in a flip flop class. Dowell has three sisters, Carey, Jacey, and Lauren. During her club career she was a student at Odessa (Missouri) High School. She trained at the Great American Gymnastics Express under coaches Al Fong and Armine Barutyan. After graduating high school in 2014, she entered the University of Oklahoma, where she competed with the university's NCAA gymnastics team.

== Junior career ==
=== 2009–2011 ===
Dowell started as an elite junior in 2009. At the 2009 CoverGirl Classic, Dowell finished thirteenth in the all-around and eighth on vault. At the Visa Championships, she finished nineteenth in the all-around.

Dowell continued her elite junior career in 2010. At the 2010 Visa Championships, Dowell finished fourth on uneven bars.

In 2011, Dowell competed at the CoverGirl Classic and was fifth all-around, third on vault, and fifth on uneven bars. At the Visa Championships, Dowell was sixth all-around, fifth on vault, sixth on uneven bars, and eighth on floor exercise.

== Senior career ==
=== 2012–2014 ===
Dowell became age-eligible for senior level competition in 2012. In March she competed at the City of Jesolo Trophy where she finished seventh all-around, second on uneven bars, and eighth on vault. In June she competed at the U.S. National Championships where she placed ninth in the all-around. Following the Visa Championships Dowell was invited to compete at the 2012 U.S. Olympic Trials. At the Olympic Trials, Dowell placed ninth in the all-around and eighth on uneven bars. She was not named to the 2012 Olympic Team. In October Dowell competed at the 2012 Mexican Open in Acapulco where she won the all-around title with a score of 57.100.

Dowell competed at the 2013 City of Jesolo Trophy where she finished third in the all-around, third on uneven bars, and won gold with the team. At the 2013 U.S. Classic, Dowell placed third in all-around, fourth on floor exercise, and sixth on uneven bars. At the 2013 National Championships, Dowell placed third in all-around behind Simone Biles and Kyla Ross, third on uneven bars, and fifth on floor exercise. Following the Championships, Dowell was selected to represent the United States at the 2013 World Artistic Gymnastics Championships. In October, Dowell travelled to the World Championships in Antwerp, Belgium with Team USA. She was selected and was intending to compete on the balance beam and uneven bars. However, Dowell was demoted to team alternate after teammate and 2012 Olympic Gold medalist, McKayla Maroney was selected to compete as an all-around competitor in addition to Biles and Ross. According to FIG rules, each country may only have three competitors on each apparatus.

In February 2014, Dowell was selected as a last minute replacement for World Champion Simone Biles to compete in the 2014 American Cup. Dowell competed alongside teammate Elizabeth Price, who was also chosen as a replacement for the event following the withdrawal of 2012 Olympic Gold medalist Kyla Ross due to injury. Dowell placed second, winning the silver medal behind Price. Dowell competed on uneven bars only at the 2014 Secret U.S. Classic. She scored 11.200, placing fourteenth on that event. Dowell was selected as the non-traveling alternate for the 2014 World Championships.

=== 2015–2017 ===
In January 2015, Dowell began competing with the University of Oklahoma gymnastics team. Dowell had a stand-out first season at Oklahoma and found action for the Sooners on vault, uneven bars, and floor exercise during the regular season. She scored season highs of 9.925 (vault), 10.00 (uneven bars) and 9.975 (floor exercise). She helped her team come in third place at the 2015 NCAA Championships. She was Floor champion at the Big-12 Championships and was later crowned Big-12 Newcomer of the Year.

On June 9, 2015, Dowell announced that she would be deferring for the 2015–16 season to compete in elite gymnastics again.

Dowell competed at the 2015 U.S. Classic where she only competed on uneven bars and balance beam. On uneven bars, she included her Tweddle release in combination with a half turn transfer (Ezhova). She fell on her toe-on Shaposhnikova (Maloney) and dismounted with a full-twisting double layout. Despite the fall, she scored a 14.350 and finished eighth on the event. A mistake and fall on beam scored an 11.800 and she finished eighteenth on the event. She next competed at the 2015 National Championships where she competed in the all-around for the first time since 2013. She finished in eleventh with a 2-night score of 113.700, including a 15.150 on uneven bars. She was named to the senior national team and was invited to the 2015 Worlds selection camp in September. On October 8, 2015, Dowell, alongside Simone Biles, Gabby Douglas, Madison Kocian, Maggie Nichols, Aly Raisman, and Mykayla Skinner, was once again chosen to represent the United States of America at the 2015 World Artistic Gymnastics Championships, in Glasgow. She competed on floor exercise, vault, and uneven bars in the team qualification round. During her floor exercise performance, her music did not play. She still competed a solid routine without music, and went along with the clapping from the audience. During her performance she successfully performed a piked double front salto. This was the first time the skill had been performed at a World Championships, and thus it was named after her in the Code of Points. Despite not competing on any apparatuses during the team final, she still won gold alongside the team.

In early 2016, Dowell attended the U.S Olympic Team Summit, an event for potential U.S Olympic Team members to meet with the media and do promotional work. She attended with fellow 2015 World Championships teammates, Simone Biles, Aly Raisman, Gabby Douglas, Madison Kocian, Maggie Nichols, and MyKayla Skinner. Dowell competed at the 2016 Pacific Rim Gymnastics Championships. On the first day of competition, Dowell hit all four of her events, which helped team USA win the gold medal. She had the fourth-highest score in All-Around, 58.850, behind teammates Aly Raisman, Simone Biles, and Laurie Hernandez. But because of the two-per-country rule, Dowell did not receive an official all-around placement. Dowell qualified in second place to the uneven bars final. Additionally, after Simone Biles withdrew from event finals, Dowell also earned a spot in the floor exercise final. In event finals, Dowell fell on a release move in the uneven bars final, incurring a deduction and placing her fifth with a score of 14.000. She earned a silver medal on floor exercise with a score of 14.825 behind Raisman. At the 2016 U.S. National Championships, Dowell earned a berth to compete the 2016 Olympic Trials. Ultimately, she was not named to the Olympic team.

In 2017, Dowell continued her gymnastics career at the University of Oklahoma for her sophomore season.

== Eponymous skill ==
Dowell has one eponymous skill listed in the Code of Points.

Apparatus	Name	Description	Difficulty (Note: Valid for the 2025–2028 Code of Points)	Added to the Code of Points
Floor exercise	Dowell	Double salto forward piked	F (0.6)	2015 World Championships
