= Asher Mizrahi =

Jewish Tunisian tenor singer and musician

Asher Mizrahi אשר מזרחי
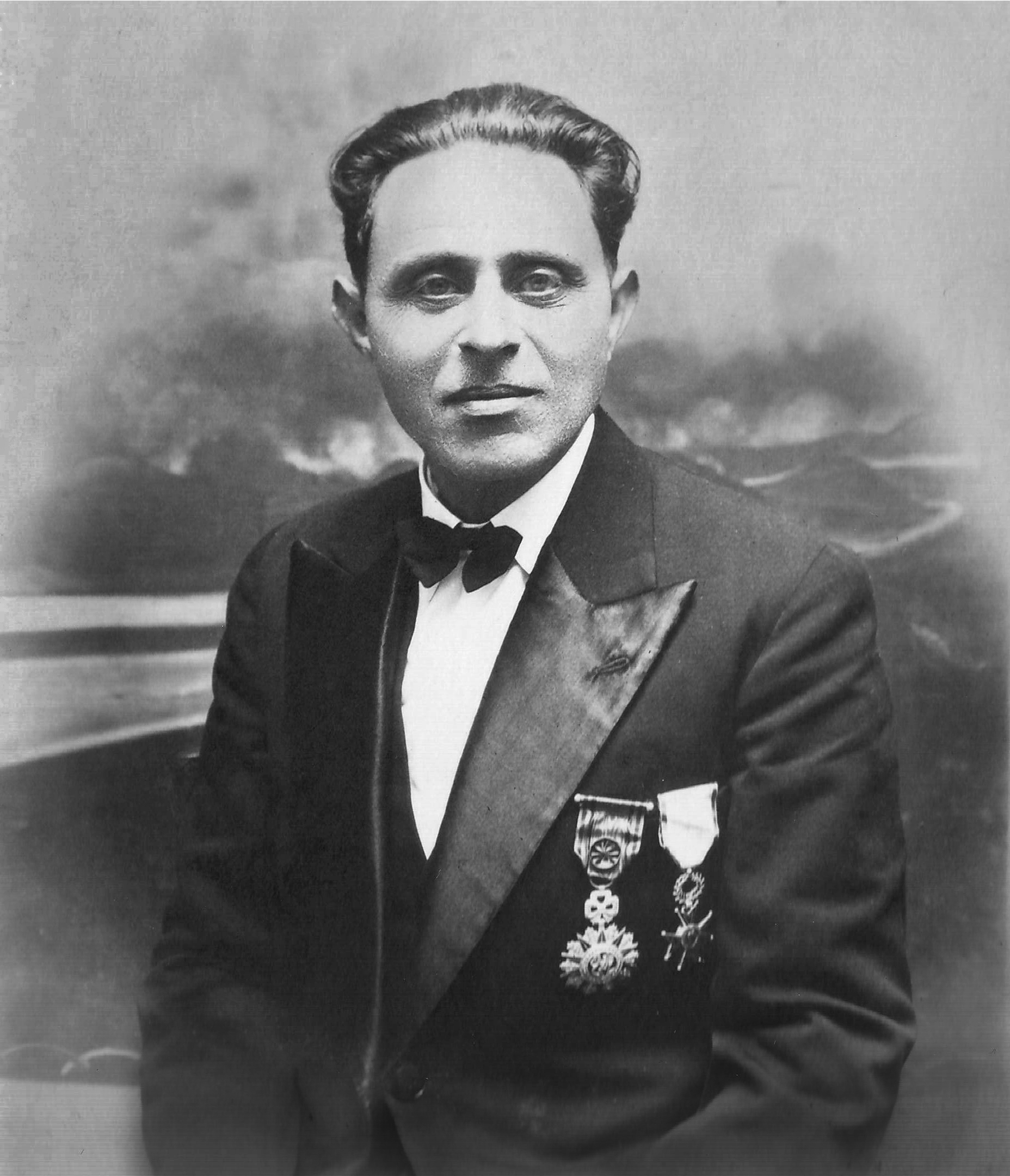
- Portrait of Asher Mizrahi

Background information
- Born: 1890; Jerusalem, Ottoman Empire
- Died: 27 October 1967 (aged 76–77) Jerusalem, Israel
- Occupations: Singer, musician

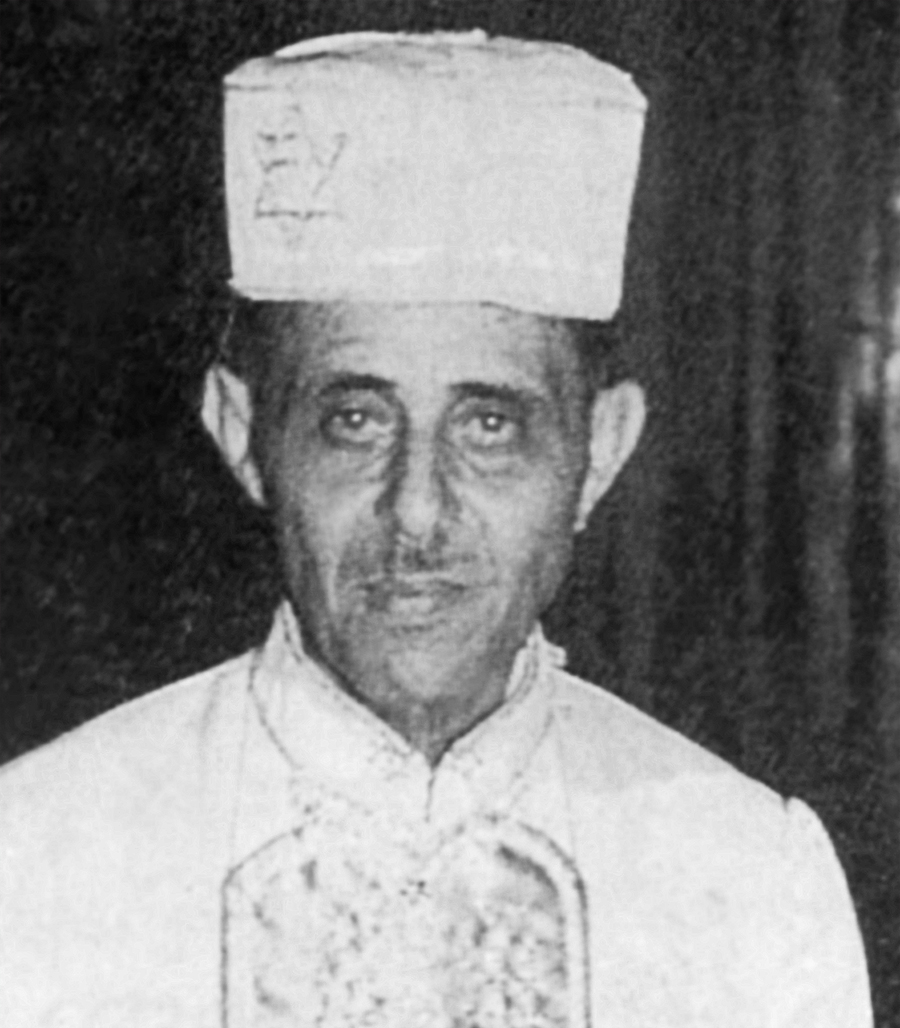
Asher Mizrahi, later in life, in traditional Mizrahi Jewish dress

Asher Mizrahi (Hebrew: אשר מזרחי; 1890 – 27 October 1967) was a Middle Eastern tenor singer and musician, who was born in Ottoman-era Jerusalem and spent much of his career in Tunisia. He was considered one of the greatest Sephardic-Jerusalem cantors of the 20th century and was renowned among both Jewish and Arab communities. Mizrahi composed approximately 600 songs, including over 200 Hebrew piyyutim, around 300 Arabic songs, and an unspecified number of Ladino pieces such as "Mi Suegra" and "Marsilia".

== Biography ==
As a young man, Mizrahi left his home in Jerusalem in what was then part of the Ottoman Empire. He initially went to Malta, then to Tunisia in 1911. From 1919 to 1929 he returned to the former British Mandatory Palestine, and returned to Tunis to live there for almost forty years. In the late 1940s, he ended his active career. He left Tunisia after the Six-Day War in 1967, and finally settled in Israel. He died three months after moving to Israel.

== Discography ==
- Nagilah Haleluyah
- Tesfar we tghib
- Ya hasra kif kont sghira
- Yechoui dammek
- Ya nas hmelt
- Men sabek Bourdgana
- Habbitek we habbitni

=== Habibi Yah Habibi ===
Habibi Yah Habibi (Hebrew: חֲבִיבִי יָהּ חֲבִיבִי), also spelled Havivi Ya Havivi, is a Mizrahi zemer hymn, composed by Rahamim Omar. The zemer has gained especial popularity among Mizrahi Jews, and is traditionally sung at religious occasions. In particular, it is sung during three pilgrimage festivals (Pesach, Shavuot, Succot) due to the closing line "וְאָז יֵרָאֶה כָּל זְכוּרֶךָ שָׁלֹשׁ פְּעָמִים בַּשָּׁנָה" ("Then all your males shall make pilgrimage three times each year", a paraphrase of a biblical quotation). The French translation is similar ("Alors, tous les hommes Te visiteront, trois fois par an."). The shorter, secular version omits the reference to pilgrimage, ending with a return to Zion
