= Elizabeth Price (gymnast) =

American artistic gymnast

- Full name: Elizabeth Nicole Price
- Nickname: Ebee
- Born: May 28, 1996 (age 30) Plainfield, New Jersey, U.S.

Gymnastics career
- Discipline: Women's artistic gymnastics
- Country represented: United States; (2010–2014)
- College team: Stanford Cardinal
- Club: Parkettes National Gymnastics Center
- Head coaches: Bill and Donna Strauss
- Assistant coaches: Robin Netwall, John Holman, Joe Stallone
- Choreographer: Dominic Zito
- Retired: April 21, 2018
- Awards: AAI Award (2018)
Medal record
Representing United States
Pacific Rim Championships
Gold medal – first place	2014 Richmond	Team
Gold medal – first place	2014 Richmond	All-Around
Gold medal – first place	2014 Richmond	Uneven Bars
Gold medal – first place	2014 Richmond	Floor Exercise
Bronze medal – third place	2014 Richmond	Balance Beam
FIG World Cup
Event / 1st / 2nd / 3rd; All-Around World Cup / 4 / 1 / 0
Representing the Stanford Cardinal
NCAA Championships
Gold medal – first place	2015 Fort Worth	Vault
Gold medal – first place	2018 St. Louis	Uneven Bars
Bronze medal – third place	2018 St. Louis	All-Around

Elizabeth "Ebee" Nicole Price (born May 28, 1996) is an American retired artistic gymnast. Price was an alternate for the 2012 Summer Olympics Gymnastics team, the 2014 American Cup Champion, and the 2013-2014 Artistic Gymnastics World Cup All Around Series Winner. She was a member of the U.S. Junior National Gymnastics Team from 2010 to 2012 and the US Senior National Team from 2012 to 2014. She retired from international elite gymnastics in April 2014.

In 2014, she joined the Stanford University women's gymnastics team and competed in her first NCAA competition on January 4, 2015. She won two weekly honors: Pac-12 Freshman/Newcomer of the Week (January 12) and Specialist of the Week (March 10). At the 2015 Pac-12 Conference Championships, she tied for the uneven bars title, tied for third on vault, and was named Pac-12 Specialist of the Year. Price finished the season as 2015 NCAA national vault champion and a three time first-team All-American.

== Personal life ==
Elizabeth Nicole Price was born on May 28, 1996, in Plainfield, New Jersey to David and Diane Price and has two younger brothers named Ethan and Elijah. Price began gymnastics at the age of three years when her parents decided she needed an activity toward which to channel her energy. She was home-schooled, first through an online Pennsylvania charter school and then through Bridgeway Academy, allowing her to dedicate much of her time to training for elite gymnastics.

In 2011, Price broke her big toe after competing at City of Jesolo Trophy meet in Jesolo, Italy. She underwent surgery to reconstruct the toe.

Price signed a national letter of intent to Stanford University, and joined the Cardinals in the fall of 2014.

Price is pursuing a Master's in design engineering at Harvard University.

== Junior career ==
=== 2008 ===
Price competed in the junior division of the 2008 US Classics, ranking 20th all-around. She was ranked 12th on vault, 22nd on both the uneven bars and balance beam, and 17th on floor exercise.

Price qualified to the junior elite level, and competed in the junior division at the US Nationals, placing 27th all-around. Vault continued to be her best event, where she ranked 13th by the end of day one and dropped to 14th place after the second day. She ranked 28th on uneven bars on both nights, but dropped from 15th place to 22nd on the balance beam over the course of the two nights of competition. She placed 26th on day one of floor exercise, but moved up to finish in 24th place on that apparatus by the second night.

=== 2009 ===
Price took part in four invitationals in addition to the 2009 American Classic, a junior qualifying event for the Visa Championships (also known as the US Nationals). She won the all-around title at her gym's Parkette Invitational, and went on to win first place on vault and second place in the all-around competition at the Maryland Classics. She then competed at the Fiesta Bowl Invitational and achieved the same results in addition to a first place win on floor exercise. Later in the year, Price competed at the International Gymnix Open Competition (different from the Junior Cup which was won by Jordyn Wieber) in Montreal, where she won the all-around title. She scored the highest on vault and floor, finishing third on the bars and second on balance beam during the event finals, and tied for first place on floor.

At the 2009 American classic, she ranked in the top 20 competitors but failed to qualify for the 2009 Visa Championships.

=== 2010 ===
In early 2010, Price participated in the Bieger's National Elite qualifier where she attained junior elite status for the second time since 2008. She finished first on vault and won the all-around competition. Price then competed at the US Covergirl Classic in Chicago, where she placed 7th on vault and 15th overall. These wins once again qualified her for the Visa Championships, this time in Hartford, Connecticut. There, she finished 13th in the all-around and earned a spot on the US Junior Nationals team for the first time alongside future Olympic teammates McKayla Maroney, Gabby Douglas, Kyla Ross, Jordyn Wieber, and fellow alternate Sarah Finnegan.

=== 2011 ===
Price once again competed in her hometown gym's Parkette Invitational, claiming first in the all-around as well as on the balance beam, uneven bars, and vault. In March, Price was chosen to compete for the US at the City of Jesolo Trophy in Jesolo, Italy. There, she contributed to the United States' team's first-place win above Russia and Italy. She personally placed third on vault and fourth on balance beam, placing seventh in the all-around. After competition, she broke her big toe and required reconstructive surgery.

She recovered quickly and traveled to Chicago to compete in the 2011 CoverGirl Classic. She competed on only two events to spare her toe, and tied for third place on the uneven bars with fellow 2012 Olympic alternate Sarah Finnegan.

She qualified for the Visa Championships for the third time, and traveled to St. Paul, Minnesota for competition. Price finished eleventh in the all-around competition, placing fifth on vault and fourth on the uneven bars. She was named to the US Junior Nationals team for the second consecutive year with Kyla Ross and Sarah Finnegan. Douglas, Wieber, and Maroney met the age requirement for the Senior national team and were therefore appointed to that roster instead, joining Aly Raisman.

== Senior career ==
=== 2012 ===
Price kicked off her first year as a senior international elite by competing once again in the Parkette Invitational, scoring a perfect 10 on vault. She finished first on every apparatus except on balance beam, where she placed second.

In March, Price was chosen for the second consecutive year to represent the United States at the City of Jesolo Trophy in Italy, where the team defended their title by winning first place. Individually she scored second on vault, fifth and sixth on floor exercise and the all-around respectively, seventh on the uneven bars and seventeenth on the balance beam.

In May, Price competed at the Secret US Classic in Chicago, Illinois. Price placed second on vault, fourth on the uneven bars, twentieth on balance beam, eleventh on floor exercise, and fifth in the all-around. These scores allowed her to qualify for the Visa Championships, her first time doing so in the senior division.

In June, Price competed at the Visa Championships in St.Louis, Missouri. On day one of competition, she placed second on vault once again, seventh on bars, ninth on beam, sixth on floor, and fifth all-around. On day two, Price finished eighth and ninth on bars and beam respectively and fifth on floor exercise and in the all-around. Following the 2012 Visa Championships Price was invited to compete at the 2012 US Olympic Trials.

In July, Price competed at the 2012 Olympic Trials and placed fourth all-around. Price was named as a team alternate to the USA Olympic Gymnastics Team alongside Anna Li and Sarah Finnegan. Following Trials Price stated "I'm really excited to go to London. I think I'm most excited about representing my gym at the Olympics, I felt really confident going in. I especially felt great about my floor routine, since that's my best event." Coach Bill Strauss said of Price, "I think it's fantastic. I think it will give her great experience internationally... She grew up with us. She's like our surrogate daughter."

In the 2012–13 season, Price was ranked second in the WCII All Around World Rankings behind Germany's Elisabeth Seitz.

=== 2013 ===
Price was slated to compete at the 2013 American Cup, but withdrew due to a strained hip muscle. She cited her desire to be healthy for future competitions, such as the Visa National Championships and World Championships, as her reason for withdrawing given that this was a relatively minor injury.

Price resumed training in April 2013 subsequently injuring the opposite hip. She was still recovering from that injury and unable to compete at the 2013 Secret US Classic.

In August, Price was able to compete at the 2013 P&G Championships in Hartford, Connecticut. Price, however did not compete all four events due to lack of training because of injury. Price competed vault and uneven bars. Price finished eighth on uneven bars. Following the P&G Championships Price was named to the USA Senior National Team. Price was also invited to the qualifying camp for the 2013 World Artistic Gymnastics Championships in Huntsville, Texas. Following the camp Price was named as the non-traveling alternate to the United States team for the 2013 World Artistic Gymnastics Championships.

=== 2014 ===
In January 2014, it was announced that Price would compete at the 2014 American Cup in Greensboro, NC after Kyla Ross withdrew owing to an injury.

Price competed at the AT&T American Cup and won the event with a score of 59.966, placing ahead of teammate Brenna Dowell.

She went on to win the all-around at the 2014 Pacific Rim Gymnastics Championships, just ahead of teammate Kyla Ross.

In April 2014, Price announced her retirement from elite gymnastics and the U.S. National Team. The reason for her departure was to attend Stanford University beginning in the fall of 2014 and compete in NCAA gymnastics as a member of the Stanford women's gymnastics team.

=== World ranking ===
In the 2012–13 season, Price was ranked 2nd in the CII All Around World Rankings behind Germany's Elisabeth Seitz. [27]

In 2014, she was ranked number 1 in the FIG World Rankings in the CII All Around.

== College career ==
On November 13, 2013, Price signed the National Letter of Intent to Stanford University and the Cardinal women's gymnastics program. A couple of months later, in April 2014, she revealed that she would enroll to the school for the 2014–15 academic year.

=== 2015: Freshman ===
Price began her NCAA career by scoring a 9.95 on vault at the Northern California Classic on January 4, 2015. On January 26, 2015, in a meet against Oregon State, she scored a perfect 10 on vault. She had suffered a broken foot during the off-season which reduced her training time in the preseason and prevented her from competing in the all-around at the beginning of the NCAA season. She added uneven bars on January 9, 2015, scoring a 9.925 in a meet against San Jose State. She suffered a shoulder injury during her uneven bars routine on January 31, 2015, in a meet against Arizona State, which kept her out of the bars line-up until the Pac-12 Championships. She competed on floor exercise for the first time on March 2, 2015, scoring a 9.975. Overall for the regular season, Price earned 11 victories in 14 performances: vault (6), bars (4) and floor (1). She scored 9.925 or higher in 12-of-14 routines, including the perfect 10 on vault, and began her collegiate career with seven consecutive individual event victories. She earned two Pac-12 weekly honors: Specialist of the Week (March 10) and Freshman/Newcomer of the Week (Jan. 12).

At the Pac-12 Championships on March 21, 2015, she helped Stanford to a third-place finish behind Utah and UCLA with scores of 9.95 on vault (3rd place) and 9.95 on uneven bars (1st place and a share of the Pac-12 uneven bar title with Corrie Lothrop of Utah). She was named Pac-12 Specialist of the Year for 2015.

At the West Virginia Regional Championships on April 4, 2015, she scored 9.925 on vault and helped Stanford finish 2nd to qualify to the NCAA National Championships. At the 2015 NCAA National Championships in Ft. Worth Texas on April 17, 2015, she helped her team qualify to the Super Six with scores of 9.95 on vault. 9.95 on uneven bars, and 9.85 on floor exercise, thus qualifying to the individual event finals on vault and uneven bars. At the Super Six competition on April 18, 2015, Price helped Stanford, ranked 11th going into national championships, finish the season in fifth place. She competed the All-Around for the first time all season scoring 39.675: VT 9.95, UB, 9.925, BB 9.9, and FX 9.9. At event finals on April 19, 2015, she won the NCAA vault title with a score of 9.9333 and tied for 5th on uneven bars with a 9.9.

Price finished the season as a three time All-American: regular season first team All-American on vault and post-season first-team All-American on vault and uneven bars.

=== Career Perfect 10.0 ===
Season	Date	Event	Meet
2015	January 26, 2015	Vault	Stanford vs Oregon State
2018	January 8, 2018	Uneven Bars	2018 NorCal Classic (@Stanford)
2018	February 17, 2018	Floor Exercise	Stanford vs California
2018	March 11, 2018	Floor Exercise	Stanford vs UCLA
2018	April 20, 2018	Uneven Bars	NCAA Championship Semifinals

== Competitive history ==
Year	Event	Team	AA	VT	UB	BB	FX
Junior
2010	U.S. Classic		15	7	11	33	20
2010	US National Championships		13	5	5	33	18
2011	City of Jesolo Trophy	1st place, gold medalist(s)	7	3rd place, bronze medalist(s)	13	4	8
2011	U.S. Classic			16	3rd place, bronze medalist(s)		
2011	US National Championships		11	5	4	21	18
Senior
2012	City of Jesolo Trophy	1st place, gold medalist(s)	6	2nd place, silver medalist(s)	7	17	5
2012	U.S. Classic		5	2nd place, silver medalist(s)	4	20	11
2012	US National Championships		5		8	9	5
2012	Olympic Trials		4		5	9	4
2012	Stuttgart World Cup		1st place, gold medalist(s)				
2012	Glasgow World Cup		1st place, gold medalist(s)				
2013	US National Championships				8		
2013	Stuttgart World Cup		1st place, gold medalist(s)				
2013	Glasgow World Cup		2nd place, silver medalist(s)				
2014	American Cup		1st place, gold medalist(s)				
2014	Pacific Rim Championships	1st place, gold medalist(s)	1st place, gold medalist(s)		1st place, gold medalist(s)	3rd place, bronze medalist(s)	1st place, gold medalist(s)
NCAA
2015	PAC-12 Championships	3		3rd place, bronze medalist(s)	1st place, gold medalist(s)		
2015	NCAA Championships			1st place, gold medalist(s)	5		
2016	PAC-12 Championships	5	4	2nd place, silver medalist(s)	1st place, gold medalist(s)		7
2016	NCAA Championships		4		4	12	
2017	PAC-12 Championships	5		5			2nd place, silver medalist(s)
2017	NCAA Championships						
2018	PAC-12 Championships	7					1st place, gold medalist(s)
2018	NCAA Championships		3rd place, bronze medalist(s)	10	1st place, gold medalist(s)		7
