= Alicia Sacramone =

American artistic gymnast (born 1987)

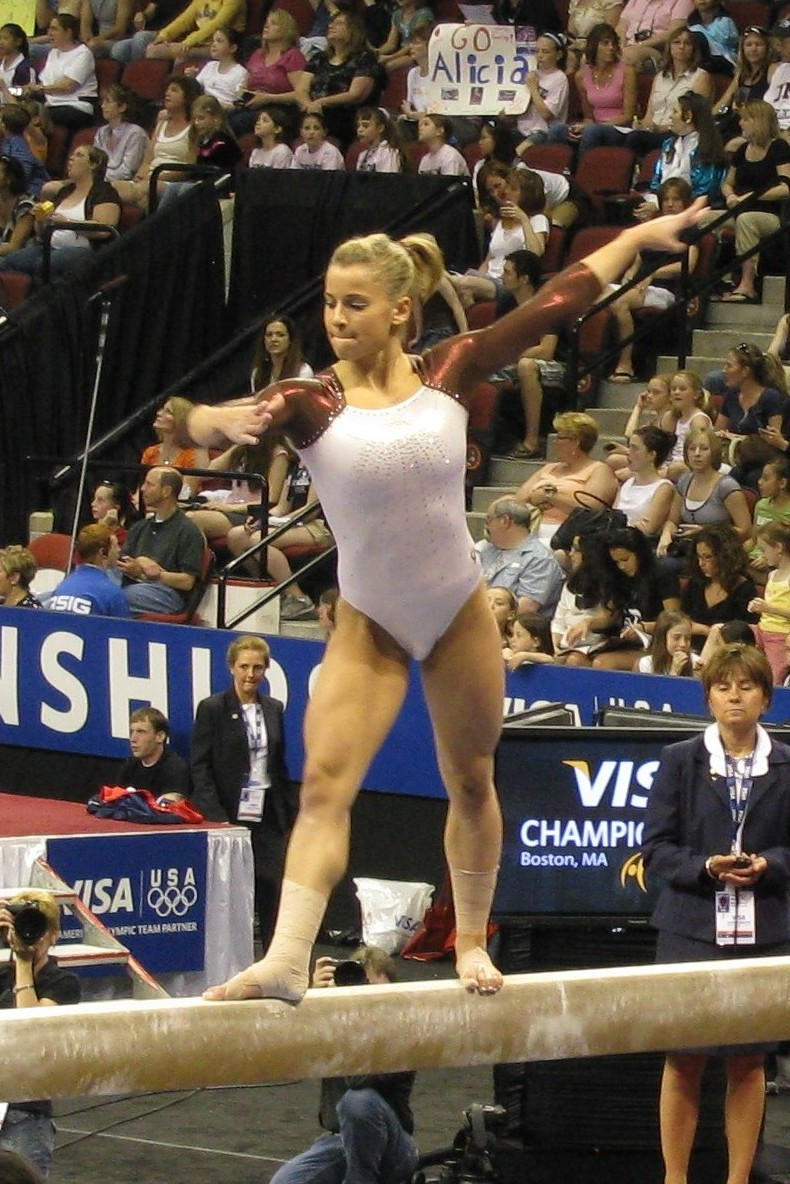
- Sacramone performing at the 2008 U.S. National Championships in Boston.

Personal information
- Full name: Alicia Marie Sacramone
- Born: December 3, 1987 (age 38) Boston, Massachusetts, U.S.
- Height: 5 ft 1 in (155 cm)
- Spouse: Brady Quinn (m. 2014)

Gymnastics career
- Discipline: Women's artistic gymnastics
- Country represented: United States (2002–2008, 2010–2012)
- College team: Brown Bears
- Club: Brestyan's American Gymnastics
- Head coach: Mihai Brestyan
- Assistant coach: Silvia Brestyan
- Retired: January 29, 2013
Medal record
Women's gymnastics
Representing the United States
Event	1st	2nd	3rd
Olympic Games	0	1	0
World Championships	4	4	2
World Cup Final	1	0	0
Pacific Rim Championships	2	0	0
Pan American Championships	5	0	0
Total	12	5	2
Olympic Games
Silver medal – second place	2008 Beijing	Team
World Championships
Gold medal – first place	2005 Melbourne	Floor exercise
Gold medal – first place	2007 Stuttgart	Team
Gold medal – first place	2010 Rotterdam	Vault
Gold medal – first place	2011 Tokyo	Team
Silver medal – second place	2006 Aarhus	Team
Silver medal – second place	2006 Aarhus	Vault
Silver medal – second place	2007 Stuttgart	Floor exercise
Silver medal – second place	2010 Rotterdam	Team
Bronze medal – third place	2005 Melbourne	Vault
Bronze medal – third place	2007 Stuttgart	Vault
World Cup Final
Gold medal – first place	2004 Birmingham	Vault
Pacific Rim Championships
Gold medal – first place	2004 Honolulu	Team
Gold medal – first place	2004 Honolulu	Vault
Pan American Championships
Gold medal – first place	2004 Maracaibo	Vault
Gold medal – first place	2004 Maracaibo	Floor exercise
Gold medal – first place	2005 Rio de Janeiro	Team
Gold medal – first place	2005 Rio de Janeiro	Vault
Gold medal – first place	2005 Rio de Janeiro	Floor exercise

Alicia Marie Sacramone Quinn (/ˌsækrəˈmoʊni/; born December 3, 1987) is a retired American artistic gymnast. She won a silver medal with the United States team at the 2008 Summer Olympics and was the 2005 World Champion on floor exercise and the 2010 World Champion on the vault. With a total of eleven World Championship and Olympic medals, Sacramone is the fourth most decorated U.S. female gymnast, behind Simone Biles (41), Shannon Miller (16), and Nastia Liukin (14).

== Early years ==
Sacramone was born in Boston on December 3, 1987, to parents Fred, an orthodontist, and Gail Sacramone, a hairstylist and salon owner. She is of Italian descent and has an older brother, Jonathan. She graduated from Winchester High School in 2006.

She began studying dance at the age of five and started gymnastics three years later, in 1996. She trained with Mihai and Silvia Brestyan at a club called Gymnastics and More, and followed them when they opened their own facility in Ashland, Massachusetts. The Brestyans served as Sacramone's coaches for the rest of her career.

Sacramone began competing at the elite level in 2002 and made the national team for the first time in 2003.

== Elite career ==
=== 2003–04 ===
At the 2003 National Championships, Sacramone placed 14th in the all-around, won a bronze medal on floor exercise, and placed fourth on vault, earning a spot on the national team. Later that year, she participated in her first international competition as a senior, the Massilia Gym Cup in Marseille, France, where she placed fourth on floor and ninth on vault.

In 2004, Sacramone helped the U.S. win a team gold medal at the Pacific Alliance Championships in Honolulu and won the individual vault title. Her performances caught the attention of the media, which began to mention her as a contender for the American team at the 2004 Olympics in Athens. However, at the 2004 U.S. Nationals, an error-filled performance dashed her hopes of an Olympic berth. Although she tied with Mohini Bhardwaj for the silver medal on the vault, she finished in 19th place overall and did not qualify to the Olympic Trials. She also injured her back and required time off to recover.

Sacramone continued competing in late 2004 as a member of the national team and was assigned to several international meets, including the Pan American Individual Event Championships, where she won the vault and floor exercise titles. At the World Cup Finals in Birmingham, England, she attracted media attention again when she upset reigning Olympic vault champion Monica Roşu of Romania to take first place on the event.

=== 2005–06 ===
At the 2005 National Championships, Sacramone won the individual titles on floor and vault, scoring a 9.9 on floor, and placed third on the balance beam and fourth in the all-around. She was named to the American team, along with Nastia Liukin and Chellsie Memmel, for the 2005 World Championships in Melbourne, Australia, where she won a gold medal on floor and placed third on vault. She also defended her World Cup vault title.

Sacramone continued to compete for the U.S. team in 2006 and participated in the World Championships in Aarhus, Denmark, where she won a silver medal with the American squad and an individual silver on the vault. She defended her vault and floor titles at that year's U.S. Nationals.

In September 2006, Sacramone enrolled in Brown University and joined the school's gymnastics team. During the 2006–07 season, she juggled a full NCAA competition schedule with her elite training at Brestyan's. She was the first female American gymnast since Kelly Garrison in the late 1980s to combine full-time university studies and NCAA competition with elite gymnastics.

During her first year at Brown, she broke the school's records for the highest scores in the all-around, vault and floor exercise. She was named ECAC Rookie of the Year and swept the Ivy League Classic, becoming the first gymnast to win the all-around and all four events, and posting the highest all-around total ever recorded at the competition. She qualified as an individual on the floor exercise for the NCAA National Championships, the second Brown gymnast ever to do so, but did not advance beyond the preliminary round.

=== 2007 ===
At the 2007 National Championships, Sacramone competed on three events, choosing to skip the uneven bars. She defended her title on the vault, placed second on the floor exercise and third on the balance beam. Following Nationals, she was named to the American team for the World Championships in Stuttgart, Germany.

During the preliminary round at the World Championships, Sacramone qualified for the event finals on floor and vault and contributed to the top-qualifying position of the American team. She also posted a score on beam that would have been high enough to qualify her to the beam final. However, due to an International Federation of Gymnastics rule allowing only two athletes per country to participate in each event final, Sacramone was unable to compete for a beam medal, because teammates Liukin and Shawn Johnson qualified ahead of her. In the team final, she competed on vault, beam and floor, earning scores of 15.750, 15.600 and 15.325, respectively. When the American team faltered after a difficult beam rotation, in which two gymnasts made major errors, Sacramone gathered the team for a pep talk to refocus them for floor. The American team earned 184.400 points overall, which was good enough to secure the gold medal ahead of China and Romania.

In event finals, Sacramone received a bronze medal for her vault performance and a silver on floor behind Johnson. She was visibly upset by her performances, and fought back tears after floor and during the flower and medal ceremonies.

Both the Brestyans and the U.S. National Team Coordinator, Márta Károlyi, suggested that Sacramone forgo NCAA competition during the 2007–08 season to concentrate on her preparations for the 2008 Olympics. In September 2007, Sacramone announced that she was "turning pro" and signed with an agent, forfeiting her remaining NCAA eligibility.

=== 2008 ===
In the 2007–08 academic year, Sacramone continued to work with the Brown gymnastics team as a volunteer assistant coach. She remained a student at Brown, concentrated in sociology, but took the spring 2008 semester off to prepare for the Olympics. She competed well at the National Championships in Boston and the Olympic Trials in Philadelphia, and on July 19, she was named to the U.S. team for Beijing.

At the Olympics, Sacramone performed on three events in both the qualifying and team final rounds of competition. In the team final, Sacramone posted a 15.675 score on vault but fell on both floor (14.125) and beam (15.1).

In the day following the Olympic team finals, Sacramone was largely blamed for the American team's silver medal placement, and was the subject of negative commentary in media reports. Sacramone herself took responsibility for the results, saying, "It's kinda hard not to blame myself." However, analysts in the gymnastics community, including University of Georgia head coach Suzanne Yoculan, former Olympian John Roethlisberger and International Gymnast editor Paul Ziert, noted that the American team started the competition at a difficult point deficit to the Chinese and that mathematically, Sacramone could not have been personally or exclusively responsible for the U.S. team's results. Teammate Bridget Sloan also said in an interview, "We've all made mistakes. It's just really hard to see her go and leave these Olympics knowing that she thinks it's her fault. It is definitely not, and we've all been encouraging her very much."

Individually, Sacramone placed third on vault in the preliminary round of competition and qualified to the individual final on that event. In the vault final, she placed fourth behind Hong Un Jong, Oksana Chusovitina and Cheng Fei. She also placed fourth on beam in preliminaries behind Li Shanshan of China, Liukin and Johnson, but did not advance to the eight-person event finals due to the "two per country" rule.

After the Olympics, Sacramone confirmed her retirement in February 2009 during an interview at a Boston Bruins game.

=== 2009–10 ===
On August 6, 2009, Sacramone announced her return to training for elite competition. Her comeback was slowed, however, after shoulder surgery earlier that year.

On July 24, 2010, Sacramone competed in the CoverGirl Classic. She placed first on both beam and vault, not competing on floor or bars, and was named USA Today's Athlete of the Week.

At the National Championships in August, she again performed only on vault and beam. She placed first on vault (her fifth national title on that apparatus) and second on beam. She was also named Sportsperson of the Year.

At the World Championships in October, Sacramone won a gold medal on the vault and a silver medal in the team competition. That gave her nine world medals, and tied her with Liukin and Shannon Miller for the most world medals by an American female gymnast at that time.

=== 2011 ===
Early in 2011, Sacramone signed a deal with Under Armour to supply her with competitive apparel for domestic competitions.

In July 2011, she added floor exercise to her competitive repertoire at the CoverGirl Classic in Chicago. Competing on three events, Sacramone won gold on vault, tied for gold on beam with Jordyn Wieber, and won the bronze on floor (13.9).

At August's National Championships in St. Paul, Minnesota, she won the balance beam title with a two-night score of 30.1. She placed second to McKayla Maroney on vault (30.6) and tied with Hallie Mossett for eighth place on floor exercise (27.35). After participating in two selection camps at the Karolyi Ranch in New Waverly, Texas, she was named to the World Championships team.

While training for the World Championships in Tokyo, Sacramone tore her Achilles tendon. She returned to the U.S. immediately for surgery. However, the team kept her name on the roster, and she was given a gold medal despite not competing. This gave her the most World Championships medals of any female American gymnast, with ten. Simone Biles would break that record in 2015.

=== 2012 ===
Sacramone qualified for the 2012 Visa National Championships. She placed first on vault and third on balance beam. At the Olympic Trials, Sacramone placed second on vault and balance beam, but was not named to the Olympic team. "I leave this sport with no regrets," she posted on her Twitter feed shortly after the team was selected.

== USA Gymnastics Strategic Lead ==
Since May 2022, Sacramone has been one of three high-performance leaders of the USA Gymnastics Elite Women's Program. In this role, she is responsible for the National Team development as well as the development of individual athletes who are or may become part of the National Team. She is also one of the three people on the selection committee for the U.S. women's artistic gymnastics team for the 2024 Olympic Games.

== Other activities ==
In June 2008, Sacramone and her teammates Shawn Johnson and Nastia Liukin became the first female athletes ever to be signed as CoverGirl spokesmodels. Sacramone is also a member of Team 24 Fitness and serves as a spokeswoman for the fitness company. In 2009, she also appeared in a Gatorade commercial that spoofed Monty Python and the Holy Grail as "Alicia, The Girl Who Made Horse Trotting Noises."

During the summer of 2009, Sacramone briefly stayed in Los Angeles and designed for Tank Farm, a men's fashion company. She has discussed her intent to return to college in the media, but announced in August 2009 that she was not intending to return to Brown University. "I plan to continue school, [but] I’m looking into transferring somewhere in Boston," she said in an interview with Inside Gymnastics magazine. "Brown is a great school and I loved it, but it was just not the best atmosphere for me; maybe a little too liberal. It was a great two years, and I learned a lot about myself and from the professors and coaches there. I’m looking at Boston University, Boston College and Harvard. I want to weigh my options before I make an ultimate decision, but I would love to transfer to Harvard. I think that would be pretty much ideal."

Sacramone appeared nude in ESPN's 2011 "Body Issue" and talked about how her body had evolved throughout her elite career and the changes in her self-perception.

On December 15, 2015, it was announced that Sacramone had been inducted as a 2016 class of the USA Gymnastics Hall of Fame.

In 2013, Sacramone was inducted into the Louisiana Italian American Sports Hall of Fame, located at the American Italian Cultural Center.

== Personal life ==
Sacramone announced her engagement to former Notre Dame and NFL quarterback Brady Quinn in August 2013 and they married in March 2014. In August 2016, she announced the birth of their first daughter, on Instagram. They welcomed their second daughter in July 2018. Their third daughter was born in February 2020. Their first son was born in March 2023 and their second son was born in January 2025.

== Competitive history ==
Competitive history of Alicia Sacramone
Year	Event	Team	AA	VT	UB	BB	FX
2002	U.S. National Championships (junior)		22			7	
2003	U.S. National Championships		14				3rd place, bronze medalist(s)
2004	U.S. National Championships		19				
2004	Pacific Alliance Championships	1st place, gold medalist(s)		1st place, gold medalist(s)			
2004	World Cup Ghent			1st place, gold medalist(s)			4
2004	World Cup Birmingham			1st place, gold medalist(s)			
2005	U.S. National Championships		4	1st place, gold medalist(s)		3rd place, bronze medalist(s)	1st place, gold medalist(s)
2005	Melbourne World Championships			3rd place, bronze medalist(s)			1st place, gold medalist(s)
2005	World Cup Ghent			1st place, gold medalist(s)			1st place, gold medalist(s)
2005	World Cup Paris			1st place, gold medalist(s)			6
2005	American Cup			1st place, gold medalist(s)			2nd place, silver medalist(s)
2006	U.S. National Championships		5	1st place, gold medalist(s)	8	6	1st place, gold medalist(s)
2006	Aarhus World Championships	2nd place, silver medalist(s)		2nd place, silver medalist(s)			
2006	World Cup Ghent			2nd place, silver medalist(s)			
2007	U.S. National Championships			1st place, gold medalist(s)		3rd place, bronze medalist(s)	3rd place, bronze medalist(s)
2007	Stuttgart World Championships	1st place, gold medalist(s)		3rd place, bronze medalist(s)			2nd place, silver medalist(s)
2008	U.S. National Championships			1st place, gold medalist(s)		3rd place, bronze medalist(s)	2nd place, silver medalist(s)
2008	U.S. Olympic Trials			1st place, gold medalist(s)		5	5
2008	Beijing Olympic Games	2nd place, silver medalist(s)		4			
2010	U.S. National Championships			1st place, gold medalist(s)		2nd place, silver medalist(s)	
2010	Rotterdam World Championships	2nd place, silver medalist(s)		1st place, gold medalist(s)		5	
2011	U.S. National Championships			2nd place, silver medalist(s)		1st place, gold medalist(s)	8
2011	Tokyo World Championships	1st place, gold medalist(s)					
2012	US National Championships			1st place, gold medalist(s)		3rd place, bronze medalist(s)	
2012	U.S. Olympic Trials			2nd place, silver medalist(s)		2nd place, silver medalist(s)	

== Floor music ==
2002: "Jazz Machine" by Black Machine
2003–04: "Explosive" by Bond
2005: "Que Locura" by Christian Reyes
2006–08: "Santa Maria (Del Buen Ayre)" by the Gotan Project
2011: "300 Violin Orchestra" by Jorge Quintero and "Heart of Courage" by Two Steps from Hell

== See also ==
- List of top medalists at the World Artistic Gymnastics Championships
