= McKenzie Wofford =

American artistic gymnast

- Full name: McKenzie Kristine Wofford
- Nickname: Kenzie
- Born: September 8, 1995 (age 30) McKinney, Texas, U.S.

Gymnastics career
- Discipline: Women's artistic gymnastics
- College team: Oklahoma Sooners
- Club: Capital TX (2005-07, 2012-13); Zenith Elite (2011-12); WOGA (2010-11); Stars (2007-10)
- Retired: June 10, 2017

McKenzie Kristine Wofford (born September 8, 1995 in Texas) is a retired American artistic gymnast. During her club career, she competed in four U.S. Nationals and was part of the U.S. National team for the 2010 and 2011 seasons and was also the alternate for the U.S. team at the 2011 Pan American Games.

== Club career ==
Wofford has competed at four U.S. National Championships (2008–10, and 2012) but has qualified for six (also 2007 and 2011) but had to scratch from those due to injury. She was a U.S. National Team member in 2010 and 2011 as a junior and senior. In 2011, she was also named as an alternate to the U.S. team travelling to the 2011 Pan American Games in Guadalajara.

McKenzie ended her elite career during the 2012 elite season and competed at both U.S. Classic and U.S. Championships. She did not advance to the Olympic Trials which ended opportunities to make the Olympic team.

Wofford's final competitive year was in 2013, when she moved down to Level 10. She won bars at every invitational she competed in during the season and eventually, placed fourth all-around at J.O. Nationals as well as becoming J.O. National Bars Champion.

== College career ==
=== 2014 season: Freshman season ===
As a Freshman for the 2014 season, Wofford competed as Uneven Bars specialist but competed on Beam once during the regular season, against Arizona, scoring 9.925. She acted as the event alternate throughout the season. She competed on bars at almost every meet during the 2014 season and scored a personal best of 9.975 at the Metroplex Challenge in Texas.

Wofford was ranked 34th in the country on Uneven Bars during the 2014 season, with a RQS score of 9.880. She competed at the Big-12 Championships (9.850), NCAA Regionals (9.825) and NCAA Championships (9.750).

=== 2015 season: Sophomore season ===
Wofford continued as a Bars and Beam specialist throughout the 2015 season.
