= C. J. Maestas =

American artistic gymnast

- Full name: Christopher Maestas
- Born: May 26, 1992 (age 34)
- Height: 5 ft 4 in (163 cm)

Gymnastics career
- Discipline: Men's artistic gymnastics
- Country represented: United States (2011–2017)
- College team: Illinois Fighting Illini
- Gym: USOTC
- Head coach: Justin Spring
- Retired: c. 2016
Medal record
Men's artistic gymnastics
Representing United States
Event	1st	2nd	3rd
Pan American Games	0	0	2
Pan American Championships	1	0	0
Total	1	0	2
Pan American Games
Bronze medal – third place	2011 Guadalajara	Team
Bronze medal – third place	2011 Guadalajara	Rings
Pan American Championships
Gold medal – first place	2014 Mississauga	Team

Christopher "C. J." Maestas (born May 26, 1992) is a retired American artistic gymnast. He was a member of the United States men's national artistic gymnastics team.

== Early life and education ==
Maestas was born on May 26, 1992, to Frank and Cindy Maestas. He attended Cibola High School and later attended the University of Illinois Urbana-Champaign to pursue gymnastics as a highly sought after recruit. While originally intending to start in Fall 2010, he needed to retake the ACT multiple times and enrolled in Fall 2011. Prior to admittance to Illinois, Maestas trained at the United States Olympic Training Center in Colorado.

== Gymnastics career ==
Maestas was a full-scholarship member of the Illinois Fighting Illini men's gymnastics team for collegiate competition. He was the NCAA champion on the rings at the 2012 NCAA Men's Gymnastics Championships. He was also the horizontal bar champion at the 2015 NCAA Men's Gymnastics Championship. While a member of the Fighting Illini, he was a member of the 2012 NCAA team championship.

Domestically, Maestas placed highly in the rings at multiple Winter Cup and USA Gymnastics National Championships events.

Internationally, Maestas represented the United States at the 2011 Pan American Games and won a bronze medal in the team all-around. He was also a member of the 2014 Pan American Gymnastics Championships team that won a gold medal.
