= U.S. Classic =

Annual U.S. summer gymnastics meet

The U.S. Classic is an annual summer gymnastics meet for elite artistic gymnasts of the United States. The meet occurs before Nationals and is a qualifier for it. In Olympic years, the aforementioned meets along with the U.S. Olympic Trials are used for selection to the team.

== Background ==
Usually only women compete in the event. Men competed at the 2022 and 2023 editions.

The senior all-around winners of the U.S. Classic include Dominique Dawes (1993), Nastia Liukin (2005), Aly Raisman (2011, 2012, 2016), and Simone Biles (2014, 2015, 2018, 2019, 2021, 2023, 2024).

== Past champions ==
Following is a list of past senior elite and junior elite champions of the U.S. Classic:

U.S. Classic Champions
Year	Location	Senior Women's Champion	Junior Women's Champion
1983	Colorado Springs, CO	Diane Durham	Tracey Butler
1984	Niagara Falls, NY	Tracee Talavera	Susie Silverman
1985	Atlanta, GA	Sabrina Mar	Jennifer Barton
1986	Scottsdale, AZ	Doe Yamashiro	Sheryl Dundas (A); Catherine Williams (B)
1987	Minneapolis, MN		
1988	Athens, GA	Phoebe Mills	Juliet Bangerter (A); Shannon Miller (B)
1989	San Antonio, TX	Juliet Bangerter	Kim Zmeskal (A); Laura Segundo (B)
1990	Saginaw, MI	Agnia Simpkins	Larissa Fontaine (A); Amy Shelton (B)
1991	Huntington Beach, CA	Kim Kelly	Anne Woynerowsky (A); Judy Esmero (B)
1992	Knoxville, TN	Wendy Bruce	Kristie Powell (A); Doni Thompson (B)
1993	Austin, TX	Dominique Dawes	Kristi Lichey
1994	Palm Springs, CA	Amanda Borden	Katie Teft
1995	Birmingham, AL	Jaycie Phelps	Robin Phelps
1996	Colorado Springs, CO	Jennie Thompson	Kristin Jensen
1997	Seattle, WA	Lindsay Wing	Kristin Thome
1998	San Antonio, TX	Jennie Thompson	Morgan White
1999	Rochester, NY	Sierra Sapunar	Kristal Uzelac
2000	Tulsa, OK	Vanessa Atler	Kristal Uzelac
2001	Pomona, CA	Tasha Schwikert	Carly Patterson
2002	Virginia Beach, VA	Annia Hatch	Carly Patterson
2003	San Antonio, TX	Courtney Kupets	Nastia Liukin
2004	Rochester, NY	Tia Orlando	Ashley Priess
2005	Virginia Beach, VA	Nastia Liukin	Ashley Priess
2006	Kansas City, MO	Ashley Priess; Natasha Kelley	Shawn Johnson
2007	Battle Creek, MI	Bridget Sloan	Rheagan Courville
2008	Houston, TX	Ashley Stott	Jordyn Wieber
2009	Des Moines, IA	Olivia Courtney	Kyla Ross
2010	Chicago, IL	Mattie Larson	Jordyn Wieber
2011	Chicago, IL	Aly Raisman	Kyla Ross
2012	Chicago, IL	Aly Raisman	Simone Biles
2013	Hoffman Estates, IL	Kyla Ross	Bailie Key
2014	Hoffman Estates, IL	Simone Biles	Jordan Chiles
2015	Hoffman Estates, IL	Simone Biles	Laurie Hernandez
2016	Hartford, CT	Aly Raisman	Irina Alexeeva
2017	Hoffman Estates, IL	Alyona Shchennikova	Emma Malabuyo
2018	Columbus, OH	Simone Biles	Leanne Wong
2019	Louisville, KY	Simone Biles	Konnor McClain
~~2020~~	~~Hartford, CT~~	Canceled due to the COVID-19 pandemic in the USA	
2021	Indianapolis, IN	Simone Biles	Katelyn Jong
2022	West Valley City, UT	Leanne Wong	Jayla Hang
2023	Hoffman Estates, IL	Simone Biles	Kieryn Finnell
2024	Hartford, CT	Simone Biles	Claire Pease
2025	Hoffman Estates, IL	Claire Pease	Lavi Crain
2026	Hartford, CT	Reese Esponda	Addalye VanGrinsven
2027	Hoffman Estates, IL	TBD	TBD

== Past men's champions ==
Men competed at the 2022 and 2023 editions of the U.S. Classic.

U.S. Classic Champions
Year	Location	Senior Men's Champion	Junior Men's Champion
2022	West Valley City, UT	Brody Malone	Toma Murakawa
2023	Hoffman Estates, IL	Asher Hong	Xander Hong

== Sponsorships ==
In recent years the U.S. Classic has been sponsored by various companies, and the event is typically named for the sponsoring company. Below is a list of past and present sponsors of the event, as well as the official name of the event during the period of sponsorship:

Year	Sponsor	Event name
2009–2011	CoverGirl	CoverGirl Classic
2012–2016	Secret	Secret U.S. Classic
2018–2022	GK Elite Sportswear	GK Classic
2023–2024	Core Hydration	Core Hydration Classic
2025	Saatva	U.S. Classic Presented by Saatva

== See also ==
- American Cup
- Winter Cup
- USA Gymnastics National Championships
- Olympic Trials
