= List of 2015 USA Gymnastics elite season participants =

The List of 2015 USA Gymnastics elite season participants, who competed during the 2015 elite season.

== 2015 U.S. National team ==
=== Seniors ===
- Alyssa Baumann - Plano, TX (WOGA)
- Simone Biles - Spring, TX (World Champions Centre)
- Nia Dennis - Westerville, OH (Buckeye)
- Madison Desch - Lenexa, KS (GAGE)
- Gabrielle Douglas - Virginia Beach, VA (Buckeye)
- Brenna Dowell - Norman, OK (GAGE)
- Rachel Gowey - Urbandale, IA (Chow's)
- Felicia Hano - San Gabriel, CA (Gym-Max)
- Amelia Hundley - Hamilton, OH (Cincinnati)
- Bailie Key - Montgomery, TX (Texas Dreams)
- Madison Kocian - Dallas, TX (WOGA)
- Ashton Locklear - Hamlet, NC (Everest)
- Lauren Navarro - La Verne, CA (Charter Oak Gliders)
- Maggie Nichols - Little Canada, MN (Twin City Twisters)
- Aly Raisman - Needham, MA (Brestyan's)
- Kyla Ross - Aliso Viejo, CA (Gym-Max)
- Emily Schild - Huntersville, NC (Everest)
- Megan Skaggs - Marietta, GA (GAA)
- Mykayla Skinner - Gilbert, AZ (Desert Lights)

=== Juniors ===
- Jordan Chiles - Vancouver, WA (Naydenov)
- Norah Flatley - Cumming, IA (Chow's)
- Jazmyn Foberg - Bayville, NJ (MG Elite)
- Emily Gaskins - Coral Springs, FL (Intensity)
- Laurie Hernandez - Old Bridge, NJ (MG Elite)
- Victoria Nguyen - West Des Moines, IA (Chow's)
- Ragan Smith - Lewisville, TX (Texas Dreams)
- Olivia Trautman - Champlin, MN (Twin City Twisters)

== Other qualified participants ==
=== Seniors ===
- Ashley Foss - Towaco, NJ (North Stars)
- Veronica Hults - Coppell, TX (Texas Dreams)
- Alaina Kwan - California (All Olympia)
- Marissa Oakley - Oswego, IL (Phenom)
- Lexy Ramler - St. Michael, MN (KidSport)
- Polina Shchennikova - Arvada, CO (TIGAR)
- Anastasia Webb - Morton Grove, IL (IGI)

=== Juniors ===
- Shania Adams - Plain City, OH (Buckeye)
- McKenna Appleton - Great Falls, VA (Hill's)
- Elena Arenas - Bishop, GA (Georgia Elite)
- Rachel Baumann - Plano, TX (WOGA)
- Aria Brusch - Forest Park, OH (Cincinnati)
- Christina Desiderio - Hackettstown, NJ (Parkettes)
- Olivia Dunne - Hillsdale, NJ (ENA Paramus)
- Bailey Ferrer - Ocoee, FL (Orlando Metro)
- Colbi Flory - Texas (Texas Dreams)
- Molly Frack - Nazareth, PA (Parkettes)
- Megan Freed - Bethlehem, PA (Parkettes)
