= 2014 U.S. Classic =

31st edition of the U.S. Classic

2014 Secret U.S. Classic
- Venue: Sears Centre Arena
- Location: Chicago, Illinois, U.S.
- Dates: August 2, 2014

Medalists
gold medal	Simone Biles; Jordan Chiles
silver medal	Kyla Ross; Nia Dennis
bronze medal	Maggie Nichols; Norah Flatley & Deanne Soza

The 2014 U.S. Classic, officially the 2014 Secret U.S. Classic, was the 31st edition of the U.S. Classic and was held on August 2, 2014, at Sears Centre Arena in Chicago.

The event served as a qualification event to the 2014 U.S. National Gymnastics Championships, held later in August.

== Medalists ==
Event	Gold	Silver	Bronze
Senior
All-Around	Simone Biles	Kyla Ross	Maggie Nichols
Vault	Simone Biles	Mykayla Skinner	Not awarded
Uneven Bars	Ashton Locklear	Madison Kocian	Kyla Ross
Balance Beam	Simone Biles Kyla Ross	Not awarded	Rachel Gowey
Floor Exercise	Simone Biles	Kyla Ross	Maggie Nichols
Junior
All-Around	Jordan Chiles	Nia Dennis	Norah Flatley Deanne Soza
Vault	Jordan Chiles	Nia Dennis	Deanne Soza
Uneven Bars	Nia Dennis	Deanne Soza	Norah Flatley
Balance Beam	Norah Flatley	Nia Dennis Rachel Baumann	Not awarded
Floor Exercise	Ragan Smith	Maile O'Keefe	Rachel Baumann Victoria Nguyen Olivia Trautman

== Participants ==
=== Seniors ===
- Alyssa Baumann (WOGA Gymnastics)
- Simone Biles (World Champions Centre)
- Madison Desch (GAGE)
- Brenna Dowell (GAGE)
- ~~Peyton Ernst (Texas Dreams Gymnastics)~~
- Rachel Gowey (Chow's Gymnastics)
- Felicia Hano (Gym-Max Gymnastics)
- Veronica Hults (Texas Dreams Gymnastics)
- Amelia Hundley (Cincinnati Gymnastics)
- Madison Kocian (WOGA Gymnastics)
- Ashton Locklear (Everest Gymnastics)
- Maggie Nichols (Twin City Twisters)
- Samantha Ogden (WOGA Gymnastics)
- ~~Lexie Priessman (Perfection Gymnastics)~~
- Melissa Reinstadtler (Rebound Gymnastics Inc.)
- Kyla Ross (Gym-Max Gymnastics)
- Emily Schild (Everest Gymnastics)
- MyKayla Skinner (Desert Lights Gymnastics)
- Macy Toronjo (Texas Dreams Gymnastics)

=== Juniors ===
- Shania Adams (Buckeye Gymnastics)
- ~~Ariana Agrapides (MG Elite)~~
- McKenna Appleton (Hill's Gymnastics)
- Elena Arenas (Georgia Elite Gymnastics)
- Rachel Baumann (WOGA Gymnastics)
- Vanasia Bradley (Splitz Gymnastics)
- Aria Brusch (Cincinnati Gymnastics)
- Jordan Chiles (Naydenov Gymnastics)
- ~~Kaitlin De Guzman (Metroplex Gymnastics)~~
- Nia Dennis (Buckeye Gymnastics)
- Christina Desiderio (Parkettes)
- Olivia Dunne (Academy of Paramus)
- Bailey Ferrer (Orlando Metro Gymnastics)
- Rachael Flam (Stars Gymnastics)
- Norah Flatley (Chow's Gymnastics)
- Jazmyn Foberg (MG Elite)
- Molly Frack (Parkettes)
- Margzetta Frazier (Parkettes)
- Megan Freed (Parkettes)
- Emily Gaskins (Cincinnati Gymnastics)
- Kailey Gillings (Stars Gymnastics)
- Delanie Harkness (Twistars USA Inc.)
- Sydney Johnson-Scharpf (Brandy Johnson's)
- Shilese Jones (Auburn Gymnastics Center)
- Hannah Joyner (First in Flight)
- Adeline Kenlin (Iowa Gym-Nest)
- ~~Bailie Key (Texas Dreams Gymnastics)~~
- Taylor Lawson (Parkettes)
- Abigail Matthews (Cincinnati Gymnastics)
- Emily Muhlenhaupt (Colorado Aerials)
- Maggie Musselman (Hill's Gymnastics)
- Lauren Navarro (Gliders)
- Victoria Nguyen (Chow's Gymnastics)
- Marissa Oakley (Phenom Gymnastics)
- Maile O'Keefe (Salcianu Gymnastics)
- Abby Paulson (Twin City Twisters)
- Gabby Perea (Legacy Elite)
- Adriana Popp (Girls In Co-Operation)
- Grace Quinn (Texas Dreams Gymnastics)
- Lexy Ramler (KidSport LLC)
- Madison Rau (Cypress)
- Makenzie Sedlacek (Illinois Gymnastics)
- Alyona Shchennikova (TIGAR)
- Megan Skaggs (Gymnastics Academy of Atlanta)
- Caitlin Smith (Paramount Elite)
- Ragan Smith (Texas Dreams Gymnastics)
- Deanne Soza (Arete Gymnastics)
- Olivia Trautman (Twin City Twisters)
- Alexis Vasquez (Chow's Gymnastics)
- ~~Grace Waguespack (ACE Gymnastics)~~
- Anastasia Webb (Illinois Gymnastics)
