= 2016 United States women's national gymnastics team season =

- Sport: Artistic gymnastics
- Duration: March 5 – August 16, 2016 (competition); January 22 – December 4, 2016 (entire)
- Games: 8
- TV partner: NBC Sports

Seasons
- ← 2015

The 2016 United States women's national gymnastics team season refers to the competitions that the United States women's national gymnastics team will participate in during the 2016 artistic gymnastics season. The 2015 World Team champions, the U.S. team go into 2016 as the favorites to become 2016 Olympic Champions; hoping to defend their 2012 Olympic title (achieved by the latter named 'Fierce Five').

== Background ==
The team's first success of the 2015 season was at the 2015 Pan American Games, in July, in Toronto, Ontario, Canada. The team, composed of Madison Desch, Rachel Gowey, Amelia Hundley, Emily Schild and Megan Skaggs, won the team all-around title. The team also clinched an additional gold medal (Rachel Gowey – UB), three silvers (Madison Desch – AA, Amelia Hundley – FX and Megan Skaggs – BB) and a bronze (Amelia Hundley – UB).

On October 27, 2015, the U.S. women's team (Simone Biles, Gabby Douglas, Madison Kocian, Maggie Nichols, Brenna Dowell, and Aly Raisman) won the World team title – a third consecutive World title. As well as the team title, the U.S. women's team won four individual titles; Simone Biles (3 – AA, BB, FX) and Madison Kocian (1 – UB). The team won an additional silver medal (Gabby Douglas – AA) and two bronze medals (Simone Biles – VT and Maggie Nichols – FX)

== Schedule ==
Date	Team?	Name	Venue	Location	Time (EST)	Result
Jan. 22–26	–	National Team Camp	Karolyi Ranch	Houston, TX	*	–
Feb. 26–29	–	National Team Camp	Karolyi Ranch	Houston, TX	*	–
March 5	No	2016 AT&T American Cup	Prudential Center	Newark, NJ	11:30 a.m.	
March 18–20	Yes	2016 City of Jesolo Trophy	SGA Gymnasium Treviso	Jesolo, Italy	*	
April 8–10	Yes	2016 Pacific Rims	Xfinity Arena	Everett, WA	*	
May 15–19	–	National Team Camp	Karolyi Ranch	Houston, TX	*	–
Mar 31 – Apr 4	–	National Team Camp	Karolyi Ranch	Houston, TX	*	–
April 16	No	2016 Rio Test Event	HSBC Arena	Rio, Brazil	TBA	
June 4	No	2016 U.S. Classic†	TBA	Hartford, CT	TBA	
June 23–26	No	2016 P&G U.S. Nationals†	Chaifetz Arena	St Louis, MO	*	
July 8–10	No	2016 U.S. Olympic Trials†	SAP Center	San Jose, CA	*	
July 17–26	–	Olympic Selection Camp	Karolyi Ranch	Houston, TX	*	–
Aug. 4–16	Yes	2016 Summer Olympics	Arena Olimpica do Rio	Rio, Brazil	*	
Sep 28 – Oct 2	–	National Team Camp	Karolyi Ranch	Houston, TX	*	–
Nov 30 – Dec 4	–	National Team Camp	Karolyi Ranch	Houston, TX	*	–

Notes
* denotes multi-day event. Start times may vary day by day.
– denotes National Team camp (no competition)

† denotes domestic elite competition

== Participants ==
=== U.S. National Team ===
Alyssa Baumann – Plano, Texas (WOGA) – Baumann was a member of the 2014 U.S. Worlds team; helping them win the team gold. In 2015, she placed sixth in the all-around at the 2015 U.S. Classic. Later, she was seventh at U.S. Nationals, and was named to the U.S. National Team. She attended the 2015 Worlds training camp but was a non-travelling reserve. In November 2015, she signed the National Letter of Intent to the University of Florida for the 2016–17 season.

Simone Biles – Spring, Texas (World Champions Centre) – Biles is the reigning World Champion, and is the recipient of 10 World Champion titles. The 2013 and 2014 World champion, Biles won the Secret Classic and National title in 2015, domestically. Named to the U.S. 2015 Worlds team (for a third time), Biles defended her individual all-around title. Additionally, during the event finals, she captured beam and floor titles also. She was nominated for the Sports Illustrated's Sportswoman of the Year award in November 2015. As a result of her successes, she is the third most successful gymnast at a World Championships of all time, trailing only Svetlana Khorkina and Gina Gogean.

Nia Dennis – Westerville, Ohio (Legacy Elite) – Dennis competed as first-year senior gymnast in 2015. Prior to the elite season, she verbally committed to the University of California, Los Angeles for the 2017–18 season. Later, in July 2015, she relocated from Westerville, Ohio, to Chicago, Illinois, in order to train at Legacy Elite Gymnastics, Inc. She competed on three events at the U.S. Classic, but returned to the all-around for Nationals; finishing in ninth in the all-around. Although she received a National Team berth, she was not named to the 2015 U.S. Worlds team at all.

Gabby Douglas – Tarzana, California (Buckeye) – Douglas returned to elite gymnastics in 2015 after a three-year hiatus from the 2012 Summer Olympics; the 2012 Olympic all-around champion. She competed internationally at the 2015 City of Jesolo Trophy and finished fourth in the all-around. Her national return was at the 2015 U.S. Classic – met with successful acclaim and a silver medal. At the 2015 P&G U.S. Nationals, Douglas finished fifth in the all-around. A consequent National Team member, she was named to the U.S. team for the 2015 World Artistic Gymnastics Championships, in Glasgow, Scotland. At Worlds, she placed second in the all-around final and fifth in the uneven bars final.

Brenna Dowell – Odessa, Missouri (GAGE) – Dowell returned to elite gymnastics in 2015, after a standout first year for the Oklahoma Sooners in collegiate gymnastics. However, in June 2015, it was announced that she would defer for the 2015–16 school year. She participated on two events during the 2015 U.S. Classic. Later, she finished eleventh in the all-around at Nationals. However, despite a rocky performance, she was named to the National Team and the Worlds team. At Worlds, she contributed to the team on three events in qualifications.

Bailie Key – Montgomery, Texas (Texas Dreams) – Key competed as a first-year senior in 2015, after a successful junior elite campaign – committing to the University of Florida in September 2014. Key's international debut came at the 2015 City of Jesolo Trophy. Individually, she won two silver medals in the all-around and on uneven bars. She returned for the U.S. elite season and placed fourth in the all-around at Classic. She repeated her placement later on in the season and was fourth at Nationals. Surprisingly, despite her high placing, Key was left off the 2015 U.S. Worlds team.

Madison Kocian (born June 15, 1997) – Dallas, Texas (WOGA) – Kocian competed her third year as a senior elite gymnast in 2015. A 2014 Worlds team member>, Kocian graduated from high school in 2015 but deferred her enrollment to the University of California, Los Angeles for the 2016–17 incoming class. During the elite season, she won uneven bars at the U.S. Classic. Further on in the season, at Nationals, she was able to the National bars title and finish sixth in the all-around. Consequently, she made the 2015 Worlds team. At Worlds, she contributed to the team's win and qualified to the bars final. Individually, during the bars final, she won the World title; shared three other gymnasts in an unprecedented four-way tie.

Maggie Nichols – Little Canada, Minnesota (Twin City Twisters) – Nichols didn't make the 2014 Worlds team due to injury. Fully recovered for the 2015 season, she participated in 2015 City of Jesolo Trophy. She finished seventh in the all-around and didn't make any individual event finals. At U.S. Classic, she was able to place third in the all-around. A couple of weeks later, she was able to outdo her previous performance and was second in the all-around at Nationals. As a result, she made the Worlds team. At Worlds, Nichols contributed to the team's victory and competed in the floor event final. She won a bronze medal alongside compatriot, Simone Biles. In November 2015, she signed with the Oklahoma Sooners program.

Aly Raisman – Needham, Massachusetts (Brestyan's) – Raisman returned to elite gymnastics in 2015 following a three-year hiatus after the 2012 Olympics, like Gabby Douglas. The 2015 City of Jesolo Trophy competition marked her international debut, where she finished third in the all-around and on floor respectively. At the U.S. Classic, Raisman was fifth in the all-around but took silver on balance beam. Later, at Nationals, she was third in the all-around and was the floor exercise champion. Consequently, she was named to the U.S. Worlds team. At Worlds, she helped the team to their success but was unable to qualify to any individual event finals.

Kyla Ross – Aliso Viejo, California (Gym-Max) – Ross participated in the 2015 City of Jesolo Trophy. She was tenth in the all-around but captured the uneven bars title. During the elite season, she was fourteenth at Classics; not competing all-around. Ross was tenth in the all-around at the 2015 U.S. Nationals. As a result, she did not make the Worlds team. The 2016 Olympics would be Ross' second Olympics.

MyKayla Skinner – Gilbert, Arizona (Desert Lights) – Skinner was a member of the 2014 Worlds team. She started the 2015 season at the 2015 AT&T American Cup event where she finished second. During the elite season, she finished seventh in the all-around at both the U.S. Classic and Nationals. She was named to the U.S. Worlds team again in 2015, but was an alternate.

=== Returning seniors ===
Madison Desch – Lenexa, Kansas (GAGE) – Desch has competed at the senior elite level since 2013. In 2014, she was named as the alternate for the 2014 U.S. Worlds team. In 2015, she participated in the City of Jesolo Trophy and was ninth in the all-around. Soon after, she announced her verbal commitment to the University of Alabama. She was part of the U.S. team for the 2015 Pan American Games. Individually, she won a silver medal in the all-around final. She participated at the 2015 U.S. Nationals and was invited to the Worlds training camp. In November 2015, she signed the National Letter of Intent for the University of Alabama for the 2016–17 season.

Rachel Gowey (born October 3, 1997) – Urbandale, Iowa (Chow's) – Gowey was a member of the 2015 Pan American Games team. She made the team following months of rehabilitation from an injury sustained during the 2014 P&G U.S. Nationals. At the Games, she then captured the individual bars title. During the U.S. elite season, she placed sixth on both uneven bars and balance beam during Nationals. She signed with the University of Florida in November 2015.

Felicia Hano (born August 7, 1998) – San Gabriel, California (Gym-Max) – Hano had a successful 2014 season, as a first-year senior. She was touted to participate in the 2015 U.S. Classic but an injury during training rendered her unable to compete during the season. In March 2013, Hano verbally committed to the University of California, Los Angeles (UCLA) and the Bruins program for the 2016–17 season.

Ashton Locklear – Hamlet, North Carolina (Everest) – Locklear was a member of the 2014 U.S. Worlds team. She helped the team win gold and, individually, advanced to the bars final. In the final, she was able to finish fourth. Although, in December 2013, she committed to the University of Florida she has since decommitted.

Lexy Ramler (born February 6, 1999) – St. Michael, Minnesota (KidSport, LLC.) – Ramler, an elite gymnast since 2013, had a successful senior debut in 2015. At the U.S. Classic, she was able to turn in a seventh-place finish and an eighth-place finish at Nationals. Prior to the elite season, Ramler committed to the University of Minnesota and the Gophers program for the 2017–18 season.

=== First year seniors ===
Norah Flatley (born March 10, 2000) – Cumming, Iowa (Chow's) — Flatley has enjoyed much success as a junior elite gymnast. She first competed elite in 2013 and advanced to U.S. Nationals in the same year. As a result, she made the National Team. A year later, she won medals at both the Pacific Rim Championships and City of Jesolo Trophy competitions. Individually, during the 2014 U.S. season, she won bronzes at both the U.S. Classic and Nationals. In 2015, Flatley captured the beam title and was second on bars at the 2015 City of Jesolo Trophy. She has intended to participate during the 2015 elite season but stress fracture in her foot rendered her unable to participate. On October 8, 2015, she committed to the University of California, Los Angeles for the 2018–19 season.

=== Unknown candidates ===
Vanasia Bradley (born January 21, 1999) – Canton, Michigan (Euro Stars) — Bradley was a junior elite gymnast in 2013. However, a torn ACL and a broken patella, sustained in June 2014, were enough to sideline her from 2014 and 2015 elite seasons. She committed to the University of Florida and the Gators program for the 2017–18 season.

Abigail Brenner (born October 21, 1999) – Maple Grove, Minnesota (Twin City Twisters)

Wynter Childers (born December 28, 1997) – Spearfish, South Dakota (Spearfish) – Childers is a successful Level 10 gymnast and was a 2015 J.O. National champion. Back in 2013, she moved to Arizona to train at a more elite facility, Carter's Gymnastics Academy. She participated in the 2013 National Elite Qualifier but didn't make elite qualification. Ever since, she has not participated in elite level competition and her status is still unknown.

Nadia Cho (born October 23, 1999) – Colgate, Wisconsin (WOGA) Cho competed as a Junior Elite gymnast for the 2013 season. However, she was forced to sit out of the entire 2014 season due to injury. In early June 2015, she moved back to her birth state of Wisconsin but has insisted that she will return to gymnastics. However, it is unsure if it will be Elite or optionals.

Samantha Davis (born June 1, 2000) – Cranford, New Jersey (North Stars) — Davis participated in the 2013 National Elite Qualifier and advanced to HOPES Elite level. She advanced to the U.S. Challenge where she placed second in the all-around. In early 2014, she competed as a Junior International elite at the 2014 WOGA Classic; a small-sized invitational in Texas. She has not competed since this event. In September 2014, Davis committed to the Georgia Gym Dogs program for the 2018–19 season.

Veronica Hults (born June 16, 1998) – Coppell, Texas (Texas Dreams) – Hults enjoyed a successful junior elite career; placing as high as sixth at Nationals. She transitioned to senior elite for the 2014 season. At the U.S. Classic, she was sixth on uneven bars. She repeated this placement at Nationals. Hults was allegedly dealing with injuries throughout 2015 and was unable to compete; expressing desire to return to elite again. She will likely attend the University of California, Los Angeles following graduation in 2016.

McKayla Maroney – Long Beach, California (All Olympia) – Maroney was a member of the 2012 Olympic team and won an individual vault silver. She then returned a year later for the 2013 World Artistic Gymnastics Championships in Antwerp, Belgium. She was the individual vault champion. Absent from competition since 2013, Maroney underwent knee surgery in 2014 and sat the entire season out. She then sat out the whole 2015 season also. She expressed desire to compete in Rio but her status is currently unknown.

Savannah Schoenherr (born September 2, 2000) – Columbus, Georgia (Georgia Elite) – Schoenherr participated in the 2015 Texas National Elite Qualifier in the summer of 2015. She didn't advance to Junior International Elite. Although no announcement of whether she will try to qualify to Senior Elite in 2016 has been announced, her personal website lists her current level as a 'Training Elite'.

Kendal Toy (born July 6, 2000) – Mercer Island, Washington/Coppell, Texas (Metroplex) — Toy participated in the 2015 National Texas Elite Qualifier in the summer of 2015 but was unsuccessful. Her website states that she would like to qualify to elite in the future. In May 2015, she committed to the University of Washington and the Huskies program for the 2018–19 season.
