= Samantha Shapiro =

American gymnast (born 1993)

- Nickname: Sami
- Born: May 18, 1993 (age 33)
- Height: 5 ft 1 in (155 cm)

Gymnastics career
- Discipline: Women's artistic gymnastics
- Country represented: United States; (2006–2011 (USA))
- College team: Stanford Cardinal
- Club: All Olympia Gymnastics Center
- Head coach: Kristen Smyth
- Assistant coach: Chris Swircek
- Former coaches: Galina Marinova; Artur Akopyan
- Music: "Telephone (Radio Edit)" (2013)
Medal record
Representing United States
Pan American Championships
Gold medal – first place	2008 Rosario	Uneven Bars
Gold medal – first place	2008 Rosario	Balance Beam

Samantha "Sami" Shapiro (born May 18, 1993) is an American gymnast. She is a five-time member of the US Women's National Gymnastics Team. She was the 2007 U.S. junior uneven bars champion, 2008 U.S. junior uneven bars and balance beam champion, 2008 Pan American Champion in both women's uneven bars and balance beam, and 2014 NCAA uneven bars silver medalist.

== Personal life ==
Shapiro was born in Santa Monica, California, to Brent (a former wrestler and marathon runner) and Abbe (a former national champion baton twirler) Shapiro, and is Jewish. Her younger sister, Nicki, is also a gymnast, and a 15-time State champion.

Shapiro attended Windward School in Los Angeles, and graduated in June 2011.

== Gymnastics ==
She began gymnastics in 1996 through a preschool program when she was three years old. Though she was competing at an international level in 2008 and was a top-ranked junior national team member, she was 5 months too young to be eligible for the US Team competing in gymnastics at the 2008 Summer Olympics.

She trains at the All Olympia Gymnastics Center (AOGC) in Los Angeles with fellow National Team member Mattie Larson.

=== Junior career ===
Shapiro won 10 Junior Olympic state titles, and was a three-time U.S. junior national champion. She was a 2007 U.S. junior uneven bars champion and all-around silver medalist, and 2008 U.S. junior uneven bars and balance beam champion and all-around silver medalist.

Shapiro first qualified for Junior International Elite in 2006 at age 13, when she finished 4th All-Around at the US Classic in Kansas, and competed in the US National Championships later that year, finishing 13th. In 2007, she returned and competed in the 2007 US National Championships and won the gold medal on the balance beam, and silver medals in the all-around competition, uneven bars, and floor exercise.

In 2008, she returned to the VISA Championships to regain her title on the balance beam, and also took the gold on the uneven bars, coming 2nd in the all-around again. Shapiro was chosen to join some of the Senior Elite National team to go to the 2008 Pacific Rim Gymnastics Championships in San Jose, California, where she performed well on all four events, helping the US Team win the gold, and winning gold on the uneven bars and silver in the all-around competition. Her performance on the floor exercise during the team competition was notable when the music cut out as she began her first pass. Seemingly unfazed, she continued her exhibition through to the end as the US team cheered her on and the arena began rhythmically clapping.

=== Senior career ===
Shapiro was a three-time U.S. senior elite national champion, a senior US Women's National Gymnastics Team member from 2006-11.

In the fall of 2008, Shapiro competed in the 2008 Pan American Individual Event Artistic Gymnastics Championships in Rosario, Argentina, where she won gold on the beam and uneven bars. She won the bars at the 2008 City of Jesolo Trophy (Italy) Grand Prix.

In March 2009, at 15 years of age she represented the US at the Montreal FIG Artistic Gymnastics World Cup, where Shapiro sustained a broken foot in training but persevered to win gold on the uneven bars.

Injuries, including an ankle injury in 2009, kept Shapiro from competing for most of 2009 and 2010, but she resurfaced as a Senior Elite in 2010, qualifying at the US Classic 4th on the balance beam and floor exercise. She fell and injured herself on the vault while attempting a 1.5 Yurchenko, and had to be assisted off the podium. Despite this, she returned to the VISA Championships competing as a senior, and finished 7th on the beam and the All-Around and 5th on the floor exercise. Shapiro earned a spot on the USA National Team for the fifth consecutive year.

In 2010 Shapiro announced her intention to commit to joining the Stanford University Gymnastics Team.

In 2011, she appeared on the cover of Inside Gymnastics' "50 Most Photogenic" issue as a tribute to the artistry and grace Shapiro presented in her years as an international elite gymnast.

== NCAA career ==
Shapiro was the 2014 NCAA uneven bars silver medalist.

In 2011, Shapiro retired from elite level gymnastics to compete for the Stanford Cardinal women's gymnastics team, and attend Stanford ('15) where she majored in Engineering. In her freshman season in 2012, she earned the First-Team All-American honor on bars and finished as runner-up on the uneven bars with a score of 9.900 at the 2012 NCAA Women's Gymnastics Championship in Duluth, Georgia. She was named a Scholastic All-American by the National Association of Collegiate Gymnastics Coaches/Women, capping off a successful freshman year.

As a sophomore in 2013, she earned academic honors including the NACGC Scholastic All-American honor for the second year along with receiving an Honorable Mention citation for the 2013 Pac-12 All-Academic Team.

In Shapiro's junior year in 2014, she capped off a successful season at the 2014 NCAA Women's Gymnastics Championship in Birmingham, Alabama, again earning the First Team All-American honor and finishing as runner-up on the uneven bars. On the road to the nationals, in April she was co-winner of the regional title on the uneven bars with a 9.950 at the NCAA Baton Rouge Regionals. During the season, she also earned Pac-12 Conference honors, including being named to the Pac-12 All Academic Second Team and claiming Second Team honors on uneven bars for the 2014 All-Pac-12 Women's Gymnastics Team.

In Shapiro's senior year in 2015 she was second team All-American on bars, second team All-Pac-12 on bars, and Pac-12 All-Academic second team.

== Honors ==
In 2018 she was inducted into the Southern California Jewish Sports Hall of Fame.
