= Pacific Coast (disambiguation) =

Pacific coast may be used to reference any coastline that borders the Pacific Ocean.

Pacific Coast may also refer to:

== Schools ==
- Pacific Coast High School in Tustin, California
- Pacific Coast School in Prince Rupert, British Columbia.
- Pacific Coast University in Long Beach, California.

== Transportation ==
- Honda Pacific Coast, a motorcycle manufactured by Honda between 1989 and 1998
- Pacific Coast Way, a road from Sydney, New South Wales to Cairns in Queensland, Australia
- Pacific Coast Railroad (disambiguation)
- Pacific Coast Highway (disambiguation)

== Others ==
- Pacific Coast Air Museum in Santa Rosa, California
- Pacific Coast Jet, a corporation based in San Francisco, California
- Pacific Coast League, a minor league United States Baseball league
- Pacific Coast League (California), a high school sports league in Orange County, California

== See also ==
- Coastal Pacific, KiwiRail, New Zealand; a passenger rail service
- Pacific Seaboard Air Lines
