= PCHS =

The initials PCHS can stand for one of several different schools:

- Pacific Coast High School
- Pacific College of Health and Science
- Palisades Charter High School
- Pamlico County High School (North Carolina), a high school in North Carolina
- Panther Creek High School (North Carolina)
- Panther Creek High School (Valera, Texas)
- Paramus Catholic High School
- Park Center High School
- Park City High School
- Parkersburg Catholic High School
- Parkway Central High School
- Pasquotank County High School
- Patrick County High School
- Paulding County High School
- Pekin Community High School (disambiguation)
- Pershing County High School, a high school in Nevada
- Pierrefonds Community High School
- Pike Central High School
- Pine City High School
- Pine Creek High School
- Pinecrest High School
- Plainfield Central High School
- Plant City High School
- Platte County High School
- Polk County High School (Tennessee)
- Portage Central High School
- Port Charlotte High School
- Port Chester High School
- Powers Catholic High School
- Prairie Central High School
- Prudhoe Community High School
- Putnam City High School
- Putnam County High School
