= Kylie Dickson =

Belarusian artistic gymnast

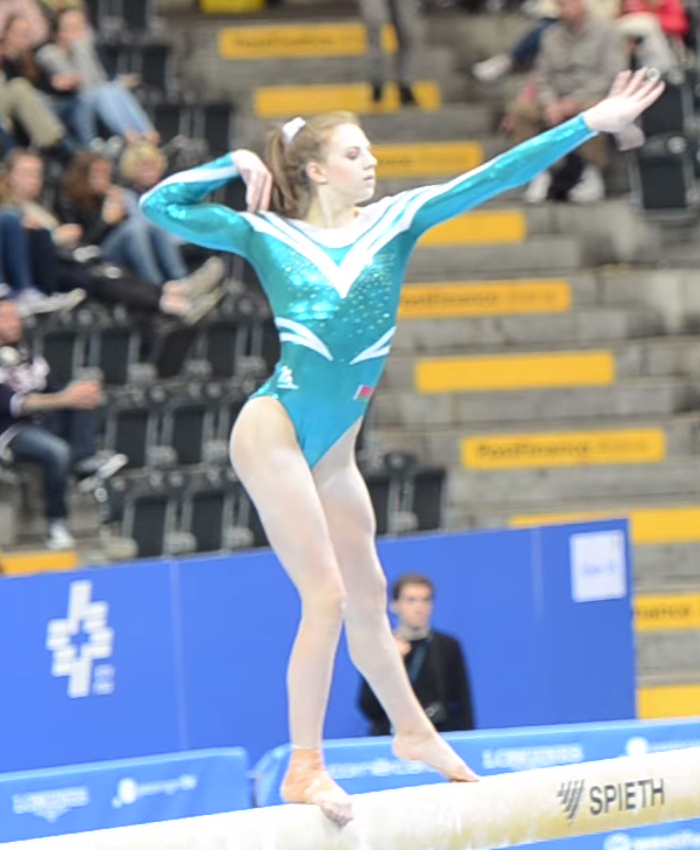
- Dickson at the 2016 European Championships in Bern, Switzerland

Personal information
- Full name: Kylie Rei Dickson
- Born: February 12, 1999 (age 27)
- Height: 5 ft 6 in (168 cm)

Gymnastics career
- Discipline: Women's artistic gymnastics
- Country represented: Belarus
- College team: Alabama Crimson Tide
- Club: All Olympia Gymnastics Center
- Head coaches: Artur Akopyan; Galina Marinova
- Former coaches: Vladimir Novikov; Joanne Novikov; Vladimir Ufimstev

Kylie Dickson (born February 12, 1999) is a former American artistic gymnast who represented Belarus in international competition.

== Level 10 career ==
Dickson started her Level 10 career in 2013. She qualified to the Junior Olympic Nationals and finished 8th on vault. In 2014, she was the Level 10 Region 8 vault and bars champion. She competed at the 2014 Junior Olympic Nationals and finished 14th in the all-around and won the silver medal on vault. Dickson started training at the All Olympia Gymnastics Center, and in 2015 she was the Level 10 Region 1 vault and bars champion. Later in 2015, she became a Senior International Elite gymnast through qualifiers.

== Elite career ==
Dickson qualified to the 2015 U.S. Classic, where she finished 11th in the all-around and 8th on the floor exercise.

She competed for Belarus at the 2015 World Artistic Gymnastics Championships, with club teammate Alaina Kwan. She and Kwan were granted Belarusian citizenship by Belarusian gymnastics officials. Dickson and Kwan's all-around performance at the 2015 World Artistic Gymnastics Championships qualified Belarus for a spot at the 2016 Gymnastics Olympic Test Event held in Rio April 2016.

Dickson competed as a member of the Belarus senior team at the 2016 European Championships in Bern, Switzerland . She placed 22nd all-around. Team members competing with Dickson for Belarus were Sviatlana Lifenka, Dziyana Hramko, and Nastassia Baranava. The team placed 17th.

Dickson competed for Belarus at the 2016 Summer Olympics, having qualified through the test event held in April. She placed 58th in qualification with a total score of 47.798.
