= Alaina Kwan =

American artistic gymnast

- Full name: Alaina Sue Kwan
- Born: July 29, 1998 (age 28) Mission Viejo, California, USA

Gymnastics career
- College team: Kentucky Wildcats
- Club: AOGC
- Head coach: Artur Akopyan
- Last updated on: August 4, 2015.

Alaina Sue Kwan (born July 29, 1998) is an American artistic gymnast. She is the daughter of 1984 Olympic Chinese diver, Andy Kwan.

== Personal life ==
Kwan was born on July 29, 1998, in Mission Viejo, California to parents, Andy and Amy Kwan. She has one younger sister, Ally (b. circa 2001), who is also a gymnast. She attended Pacific Coast High School and graduated in 2016. She joined the University of Kentucky Gymnastics Team in 2016 and studies Broadcast Journalism.

== Gymnastics career ==
=== 2013–15: Level 10 career ===
Kwan started competing Level 10 for the 2013 season, following a move to All Olympia Gymnastics Center. She placed twenty-third in the all-around at States; competing only two events. In March 2014, Alaina participated in the National Elite Qualifier in California but failed to meet the qualification requirement. During the championship season, she finished eighth in the all-around at States and fifteenth at Regionals. On October 22, 2014, Kwan committed to the Kentucky Wildcats women's gymnastics team.

Kwan placed second in the all-around at States, behind Kennedi Edney, and also won two silver medals on vault and bars. In addition, she was the floor champion too. At Regionals, she ended up third in the all-around and took home the floor title again. Kwan qualified to J.O. Nationals but elected not to attend.

=== 2015–present: Elite career ===
A year before, in 2014, Kwan took part in an Elite Qualifier but didn't qualify to elite status. In March 2015, she participated in the National Elite Qualifier in Los Angeles and qualified to Senior International Elite status. At the 2015 U.S. Classic in Chicago, Kwan was ninth in the all-around. She did not advance to U.S. Nationals.

On September 30, 2015, International Gymnast Magazine announced that she and All Olympia Gymnastics Center elite teammate, Kylie Dickson, had joined the Belarusian National Gymnastics team; despite having no affiliation to the country. The process was co-ordinated by the pair's coaches, Artur Akopyan who is Soviet Armenian and Galina Marinova; a Bulgarian, as well as Nellie Kim, President of the Women's Artistic Gymnastics Technical Committee and fellow countrywoman. This sparked outrage from gymnastics fans, criticizing Kim and the AOGC coaches. She represented Belarus with Dickson at the 2015 World Artistic Gymnastics Championships.

Kwan competed at the 2015 World Championships for Belarus on October 24, 2015. A month later, she signed the National Letter of Intent to the University of Kentucky.
