= Liang Chow =

Chinese artistic gymnast and gymnastics coach

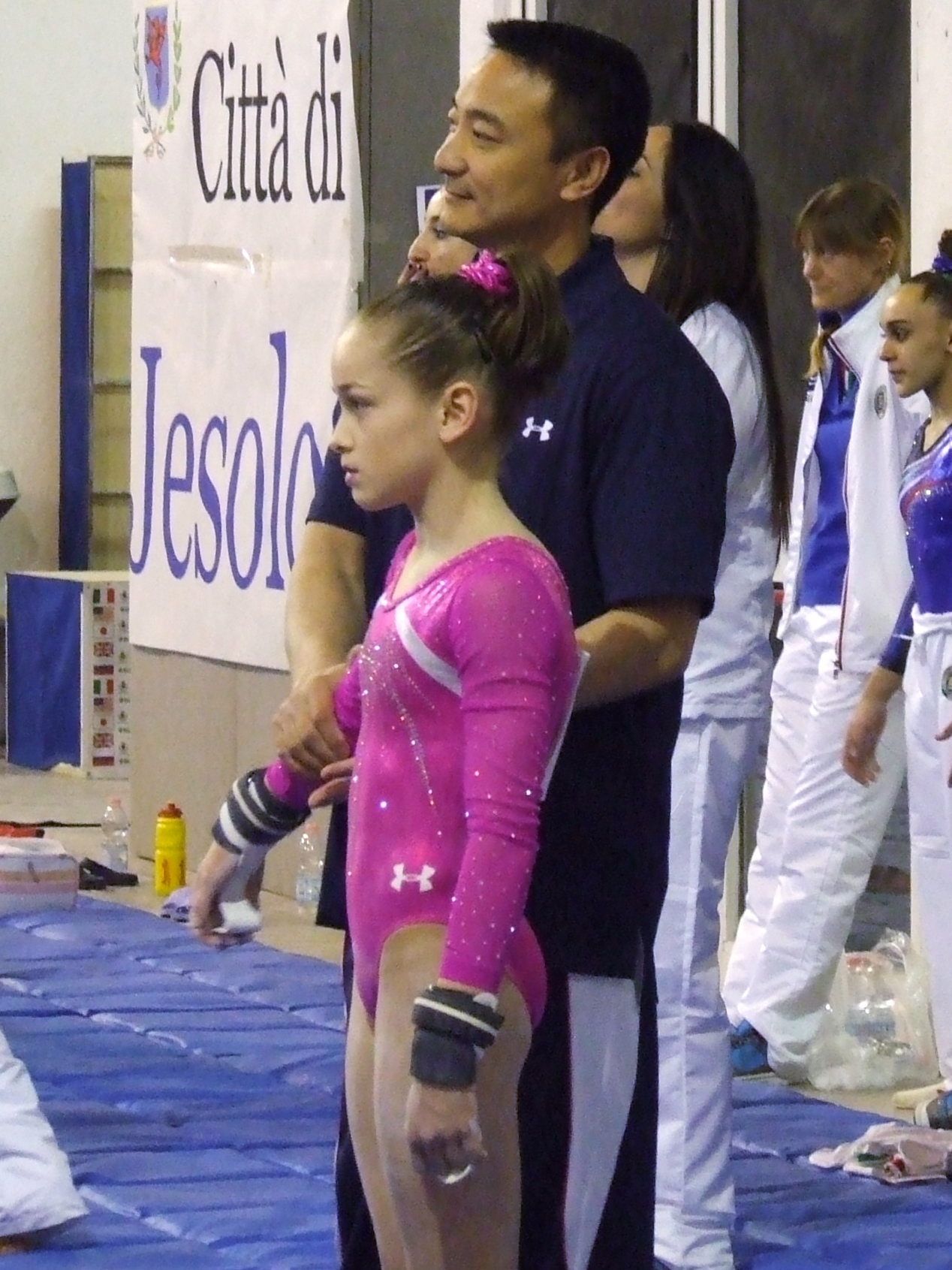
- Chow with athlete Norah Flatley at the 2014 City of Jesolo Trophy

Personal information
- Alternative name: Qiao Liang
- Born: 1 January 1968 (age 58) Beijing, China

Gymnastics career
- Discipline: Men's artistic gymnastics
- Country represented: China
Medal record
Representing China
Asian Games
| Gold medal – first place | 1990 Beijing | Team |

Liang Chow (also known as Qiao Liang; simplified Chinese: 乔良; traditional Chinese: 喬良; pinyin: Qiáo Liáng) (born January 1, 1968) is a Chinese-American former artistic gymnast. He is the founder, owner, and head coach of Chow's Gymnastics and Dance Institute in West Des Moines, Iowa. He is notable for being the coach of 2008 Olympic balance beam champion Shawn Johnson and 2012 Olympic individual all-around champion Gabby Douglas. He coached senior US gymnasts Norah Flatley and Rachel Gowey and junior US gymnast Victoria Nguyen.

== Gymnastics career ==
Growing up in Beijing, Chow was tapped by a district club at the age of 5 to train in gymnastics. He was on China's national gymnastics team for more than a decade, winning numerous national and international medals. However, he never competed in the Olympic Games; in 1988 he was too young to make the Chinese team, and before 1992 he suffered a back injury and retired from competition.

== Post-gymnastics career ==
He moved to the United States in 1991 on the suggestion of his aunt, who was working on her Ph.D. at the University of Iowa. He accepted an English scholarship and a position as an assistant coach for the University of Iowa's men's gymnastics program. Afterwards, he accepted a coaching job for the women's program. Following his experience working with female gymnasts, Chow decided to open his own gym to train gymnasts at a younger age, when they would be more flexible and open to learning new skills. He and his wife moved to West Des Moines and opened Chow's Gymnastics and Dance Institute on August 23, 1998. He expanded his operation to an 11 acres (4.5 ha), two-gym facility by 2003. In June 2008, a flood destroyed the facilities.

Chow was the personal coach of Shawn Johnson since 1998. He began working with Gabby Douglas in 2010. He is known for his fatherly affection toward his proteges. He was named the coach of the Chinese women's national gymnastics team in June 2018.

== Personal ==
Chow is married to Liwen Zhuang, a former gymnast on the Chinese national team. They have one child named Kevin.
