= Chow's Gymnastics and Dance Institute =

American gymnastics academy

Coordinates: 41.5553°N 93.7364°W

Chow's
- Full name: Chow's Gymnastics and Dance Institute
- Sport: Women's artistic gymnastics
- Founded: 23 August 1998; 25 years ago
- League: USA Gymnastics
- Based in: West Des Moines, Iowa
- Owner: Liang Chow
- Head coach: Liang Chow
- Website: chowsgym.com

Chow's Gymnastics and Dance Institute, commonly referred to as Chow's, is an American women's artistic gymnastics academy based in West Des Moines, Iowa. The academy was founded by Chinese former artistic gymnast Liang Chow. The club has produced Olympic champions, Shawn Johnson and Gabrielle Douglas, and United States national team members such as Norah Flatley and Rachel Gowey.

== History ==
=== Foundations and Shawn Johnson ===
Chow's was opened on August 23, 1998, by former Chinese national gymnast and Iowa Hawkeyes assistant coach Liang Chow and his wife, Liwen Zhuang.

In 2004, Level 10 protegee, Shawn Johnson, finished fourth at the 2004 J.O. Nationals. As a result, she was the first Chow gymnast to make the J.O. National Team.

At the 2005 Level 9 Eastern Championships, Chow's was represented 3 times. Jessa Hansen won two individual medals. Although Chow's didn't have any participants at the 2005 Level 10 J.O. Nationals, Shawn Johnson qualified to Junior International Elite status; the first of any Chow gymnast. In her first competition as an elite, the 2005 U.S. Classic, she finished third in the all-around.

As a result, she qualified to U.S. Nationals. At the competition, Johnson finished tenth in the all-around. Her result at the competition was enough to be named to the Junior National Team – the first of any Chow gymnast. Now a National Team member, she was invited to represent the United States at the 2006 Pacific Alliance Championships, held in Honolulu, Hawaii. She won the individual all-around competition.

=== Coaching abuse ===
Former Chow's gymnastics coach Sean Gardner had two complaints against him for touching gymnasts inappropriately, which led to a U.S. Center for SafeSport suspension in July 2022. His suspension led to Chow's firing Gardner. He was later arrested in August 2025 by the Federal Bureau of Investigation on child pornography charges. The Associated Press reported that the FBI believed Gardner "targeted children" at Chow's and a previous gym. Gardner was ultimately sentenced to 90 years in prison. Lawsuits still remain active against Gardner and Chow's.

== Notable Gymnasts and Alumni ==
Shawn Johnson:

- 2008 Olympic balance beam champion and team, all-around, and floor exercise silver medalist
- 2007 World team, all-around, and floor exercise champion
- 2007 Pan American Games team, all-around, uneven bars, and balance beam champion, floor exercise silver medalist
- 2011 Pan American Games team champion and uneven bars silver medalist
- 2007 American Cup Champion; 2008 silver medalist
- 2007 Longines Prize for Elegance recipient

Gabby Douglas:

- 2012 Olympic team and all-around champion
- 2016 Olympic team champion
- 2011 World team champion
- 2015 World team champion and all-around silver medalist
- 2012 Pacific Rim team and uneven bars champion
- 2010 Pan American team and uneven bars champion
- 2016 American Cup champion

Norah Flatley:

- 2014 Pacific Rim junior team and balance beam champion
- 2019 NCAA Championships team bronze medalist
- UCLA Bruins gymnastics

Rachel Gowey:

- 2015 Pan American Games team and uneven bars champion
- 2018 NCAA Championships team bronze medalist
- Florida Gators gymnastics
