= McKayla Maroney =

American artistic gymnast (born 1995)

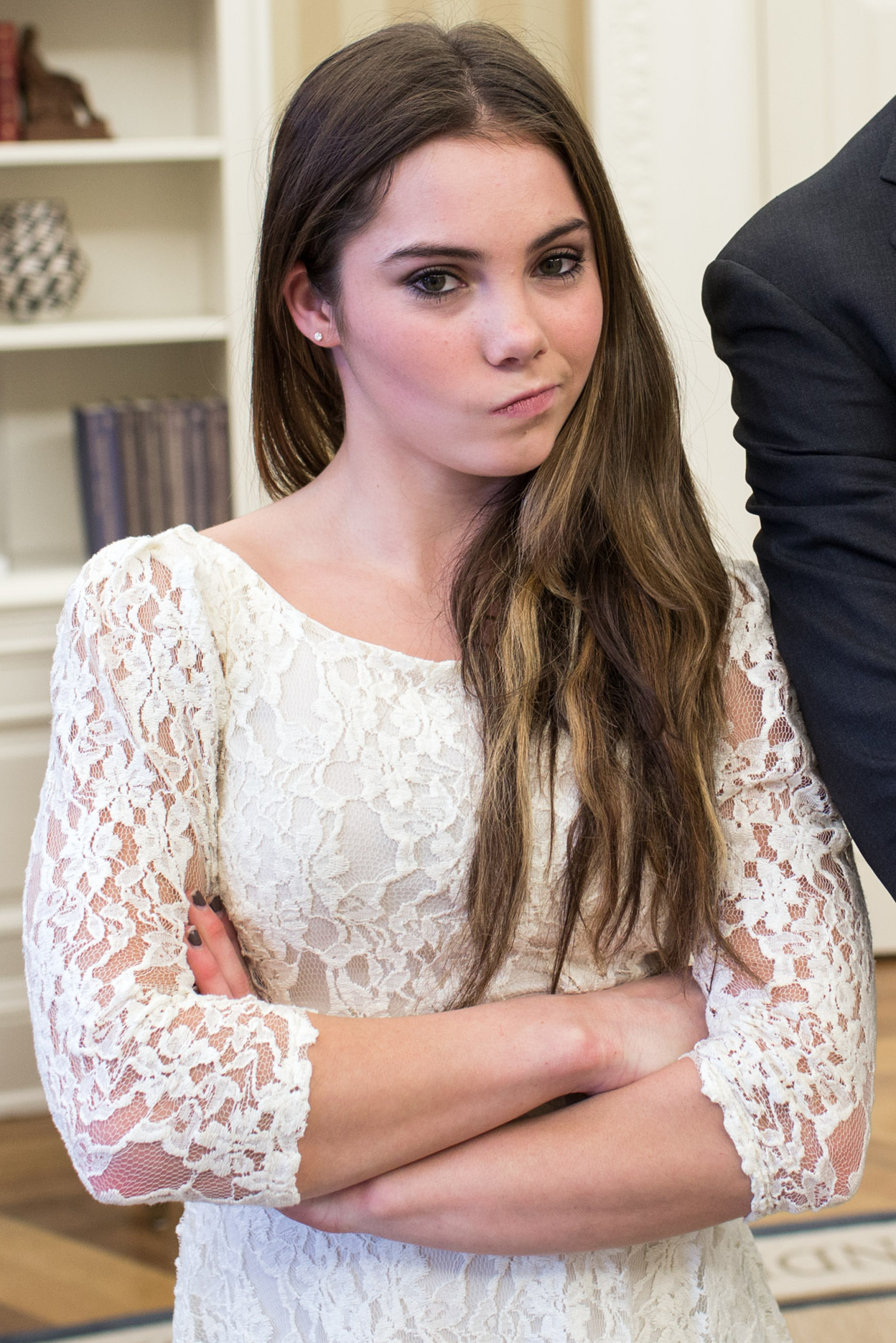
- Maroney mimicking her "not impressed" look, 2012

Personal information
- Full name: McKayla Rose Maroney
- Born: December 9, 1995 (age 30) Aliso Viejo, California, US

Gymnastics career
- Discipline: Women's artistic gymnastics
- Country represented: (2010–2014 (United States))
- Gym: All Olympia Gymnastics Center (AOGC)
- Head coach: Artur Akopyan
- Assistant coach: Galina Marinova
- Former coaches: Jenny Zhang, Howie Liang
- Retired: February 24, 2016
Medal record
Women's artistic gymnastics
Representing United States
Olympic Games
Gold medal – first place	2012 London	Team
Silver medal – second place	2012 London	Vault
World Championships
Gold medal – first place	2011 Tokyo	Team
Gold medal – first place	2011 Tokyo	Vault
Gold medal – first place	2013 Antwerp	Vault
Pan American Championships
Gold medal – first place	2010 Guadalajara	Team
Gold medal – first place	2010 Guadalajara	Vault
Gold medal – first place	2010 Guadalajara	Floor exercise

McKayla Rose Maroney (born December 9, 1995) is an American former artistic gymnast. She was a member of the American women's gymnastics team, dubbed the Fierce Five, that won a gold medal in the team competition at the 2012 Summer Olympics. There, she also won an individual silver medal on the vault. Maroney was also a member of the gold-winning American team at the 2011 World Championships, where she also won the vault title. She then became the first U.S. female gymnast to defend a World Championship vault title at the 2013 World Championships. Earlier in her career, she won three gold medals at the 2010 Pan American Championships.

A photograph of Maroney with a "not impressed" expression, taken after winning the vault silver medal at the 2012 Summer Olympics, became an Internet meme. In 2016, she retired from gymnastics after not competing since the 2013 World Championships.

== Early life, family and education ==
McKayla Rose Maroney was born in Aliso Viejo, California, on December 9, 1995, the daughter of Erin and Mike Maroney (died 2019). Her father was a quarterback at Purdue University, and her mother was a figure skater. She is of Irish Catholic descent. She has two siblings, Tarynn and Kav.

On how she began gymnastics, Maroney said, "When I was younger, I would be watching Tarzan and running around on all fours. My mom was like, 'I need to put this child in gymnastics. She's crazy.'" When she was nine years old, she started training at Gym-Max in Costa Mesa, California, alongside future Olympic teammate Kyla Ross. In 2010, Maroney left Gym-Max to train at the All Olympia Gymnastics Center.

She was homeschooled.

== Junior gymnastics career ==
Maroney competed at the 2009 U.S. Championships in Dallas, Texas, and placed 27th in the all-around. This competition was the first time she performed the Amanar vault, which helped her finish third in the vault standings behind Kyla Ross and Bridgette Caquatto.

At the 2010 U.S. Classic in Chicago, Illinois, Maroney placed seventh in the all-around competition with a total score of 55.650. She then competed at the U.S. Championships and won the bronze medal in the all-around behind Ross and Katelyn Ohashi, and she won the junior national vault title. She was then selected to compete at the Pan American Championships in Guadalajara, Mexico. She and teammates Ross, Sabrina Vega, Gabby Douglas, Brenna Dowell, and Sarah Finnegan beat silver medalist Canada by nearly 20 points. In the event finals, she won the gold medals on both the vault and floor exercise.

== Senior gymnastics career ==
=== 2011 ===
Maroney made her senior international debut at the City of Jesolo Trophy in Jesolo, Italy, and won the all-around competition. She also won gold medals with the American team and on the vault. She only competed on the balance beam and the floor exercise at the U.S. Classic, finishing sixth and fifth, respectively. She then competed at the U.S. Championships in Saint Paul, Minnesota. During the first day of competition, she fell on a double Arabian on the floor exercise and ranked fifth in the all-around rankings. She improved her performance on the second day to ultimately finish second to Jordyn Wieber in the all-around. Additionally, she won the vault competition.

Maroney was selected to compete at the 2011 World Championships in Tokyo alongside Wieber, Sabrina Vega, Aly Raisman, Gabby Douglas, and Alicia Sacramone. She contributed scores on the vault and floor exercise toward the American team's gold medal win by over four points ahead of Russia. She then won the gold medal in the vault final by more than half a point ahead of silver medalist Oksana Chusovitina.

=== 2012 ===
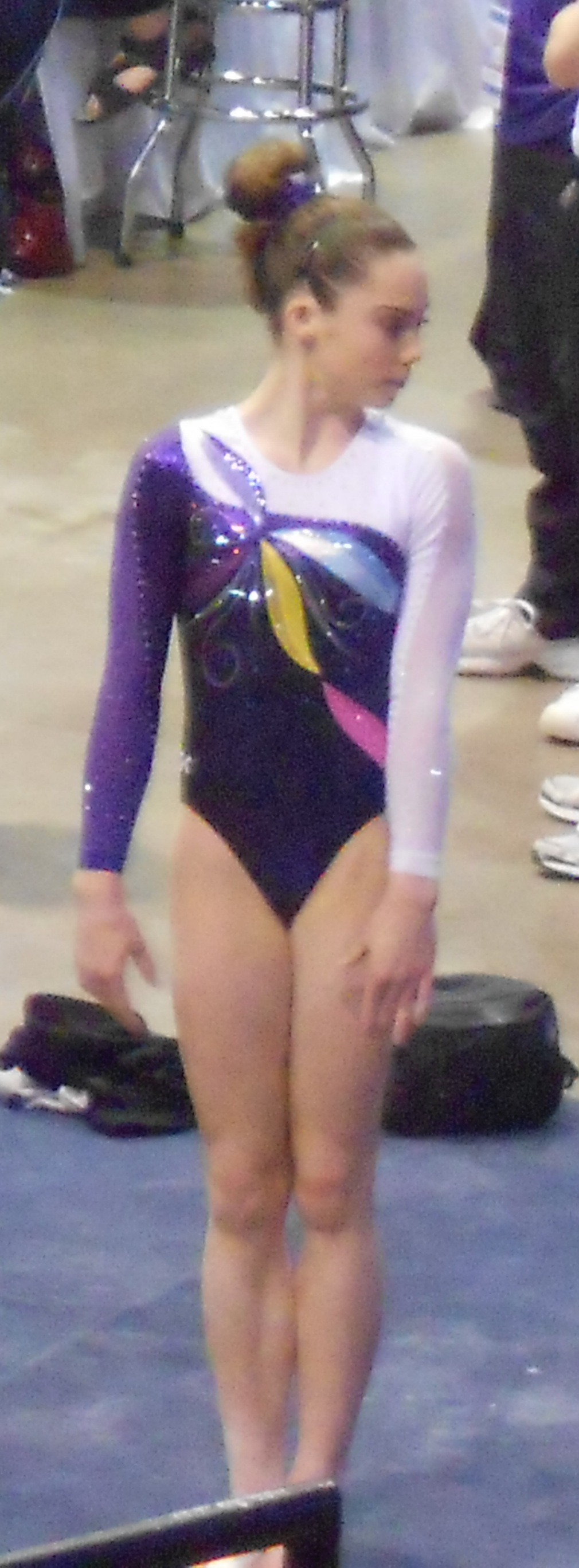
Maroney at the 2012 U.S. Classic

In preparation for the Olympic season, Maroney kept the Amanar as her first vault and upgraded her second vault to the roundoff half-on layout full. She also increased her difficulty scores on the uneven bars and balance beam. She began the season at the City of Jesolo Trophy and won gold medals with the American team and on the vault. Additionally, she placed fourth in the all-around competition with a score of 57.950.

In May, Maroney competed at the U.S. Classic in Chicago, Illinois. She placed first on vault with a score of 16.100 and tenth on balance beam with a score of 13.800. She then competed at the U.S. National Championships, and after the first day of competition, she was ranked seventh in the all-around with a score of 58.700. During the warmups for the second day of competition, she fell on a tumbling pass on floor landing on her back. Maroney was taken to the hospital and diagnosed with a minor concussion and a nasal fracture. She took a week off from training and successfully petitioned to compete at the Olympic Trials.

At the beginning of July, Maroney competed at the Olympic Trials in San Jose, California. On the first day of competition, she fell off the uneven bars and balance beam, but she had the highest vault score. She ultimately placed seventh in the all-around with a two-day combined score of 117.650. She placed first on the vault and fifth on the floor exercise. Maroney was chosen as a member of the team that was sent to the 2012 Summer Olympics alongside Gabby Douglas, Aly Raisman, Kyla Ross, and Jordyn Wieber. Afterward, she said, "This is the best feeling – it's just so amazing. I'm in shock right now. I think this will be the happiest I'll ever be in my life... my teammate Kyla Ross– we have been best friends since we were six years old, so it's just absolutely amazing to be going to the Olympics." She was featured on the cover of Sports Illustrated with the rest of the team on the July 18, 2012, "Olympic Preview" issue. This marked the first time an entire Olympic gymnastics team had been featured on the cover of Sports Illustrated.

=== London Olympics ===
At the end of July, Maroney competed at the 2012 Summer Olympics in London. She told NBColympics.com that while training a balance beam dismount, she aggravated a previous bone break in the big toe of her right foot, but she still chose to compete, stating, "I worked so hard to be here, I can ignore the pain for a little bit." In 2021, she claimed she actually had a broken foot, and team doctor Larry Nassar downplayed the injury to head coach Márta Károlyi to keep Maroney on the team. Along with Jordyn Wieber, she helped change the team's nickname from the "Fab Five" to the "Fierce Five". While on the bus to a training session, they decided to change the name because the "Fab Five" was in use by a basketball team associated with the University of Michigan as well as associated with the musical group Duran Duran. They searched for words starting with the letter 'F' to describe the team. The top choices were "feisty" and "fierce". Maroney and Wieber opted for "fierce". They said it described their floor routines, and the rest of the team concurred.

Maroney helped the American team qualify for the team final in first place, and individually, she qualified in first place to the vault final with a score of 15.800. In the team final, she stuck her Amanar vault and contributed a score of 16.233 toward the American team's first-place finish. Her vault received an execution average of 9.733, the highest execution score at an Olympics or World Championships under the open-ended scoring system which was introduced in 2006. They became the second U.S. team, after the "Magnificent Seven" in 1996, to win the Olympic team competition.

According to Alexa Ainsworth from NBC Olympics and Juliet Macur from The New York Times, Maroney went into the vault final as the favorite to win. She successfully performed an Amanar for her first vault, but she fell on her second. This fall ended her 33-vault hitting streak in competition. With the fall, Maroney came in second behind Sandra Izbașa of Romania with an average score of 15.083. After the competition, she said, "I didn't get my full block, my hands didn't really touch the vault. I still walked out with a silver medal and I'm happy about that... I know I can do better vaults, but I also know I didn't deserve the gold medal because I fell on my second vault."

==== "McKayla is not impressed" ====
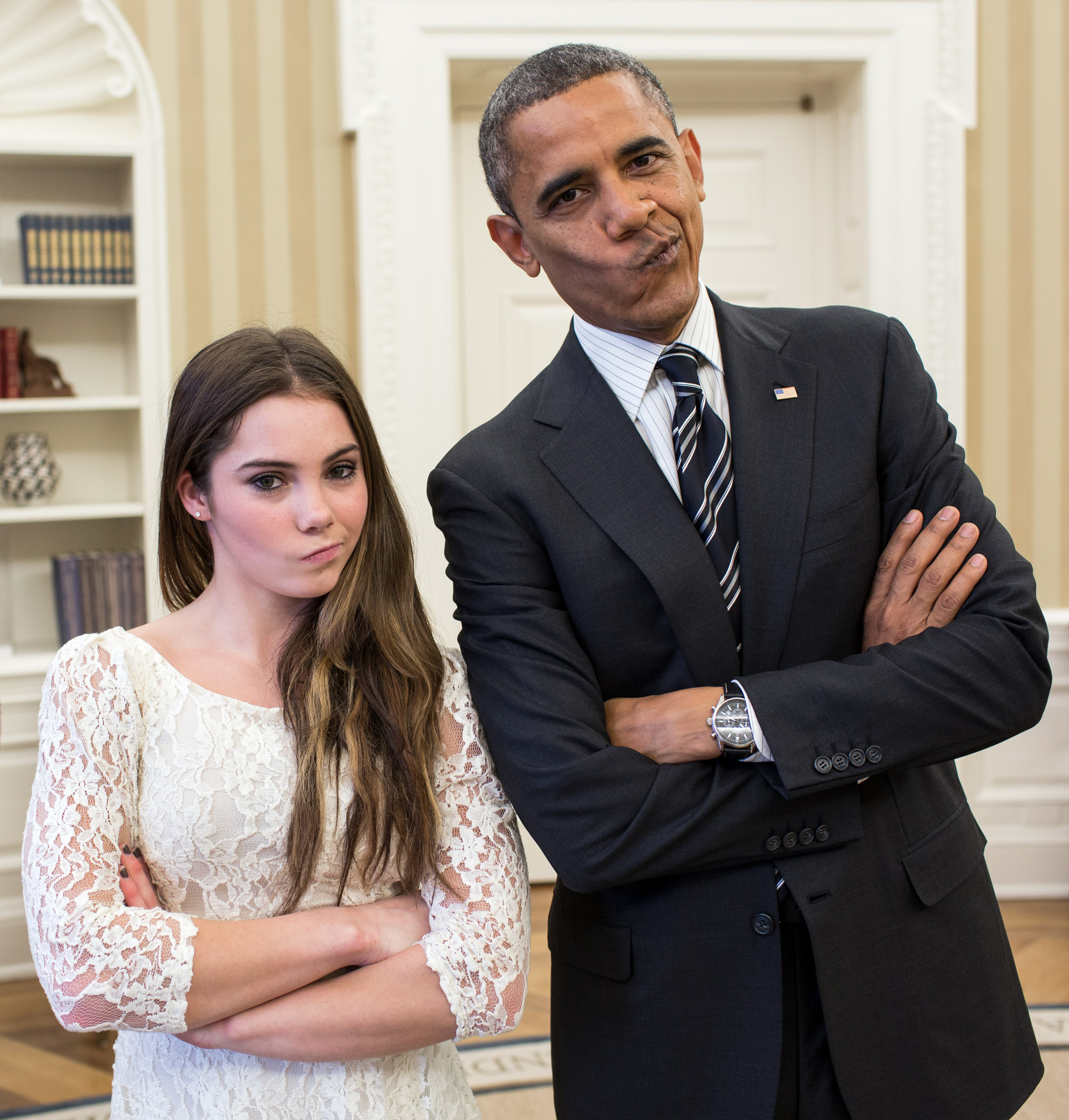
US president Barack Obama mimics Maroney's "not impressed" look in the Oval Office (November 2012)

After winning the silver medal in the vault finals, Maroney was photographed on the medal podium while giving a brief look of disappointment with her lips pursed to the side. The image became an Internet phenomenon sparked by a Tumblr blog called "McKayla is not impressed". The image went viral after it was Photoshopped into various places and situations such as on top of the Great Wall of China and standing next to Usain Bolt. Maroney said that she found the Internet meme "kinda funny." She later poked fun at the meme on various occasions, including appearances on Late Show with David Letterman, The Colbert Report, Dancing with the Stars: All-Stars, Extra, and when she and the rest of the U.S. Gymnastics team met United States President Barack Obama at the White House in November 2012. She and President Obama posed for a photo together, both making the same pursed-lips expression. The podium picture made the top spot on Yahoo's list of "Most Viral Photos" of 2012. Maroney starred in a 2021 GEICO commercial playing on her "not impressed" pose.

=== Post-Olympics ===
In September 2012, Maroney was injured during an uneven bars dismount while performing at the Kellogg's Tour of Gymnastics Champions in Ontario, California. An MRI revealed that she had fractured the tibia in her left leg. The injury occurred shortly before teammate Aly Raisman injured herself performing on the same bars. On September 13, 2012, Maroney had two screws inserted to repair the fractured left tibia. She wore an immobilizer to keep the leg straight until doctors determined that she was ready to resume limited walking and rebuilding range of motion. Then 15 days later, she had surgery on the toe she injured before the Olympic Games. Then in December, she had another surgery to remove the screws in her leg. She was cleared to return to training in January 2013.

On January 12, 2013, Maroney served as one of the judges for the Miss America pageant. She participated in the Thirty Seconds to Mars music video "Up in the Air". In 2013, Maroney signed a sponsorship agreement with Adidas Gymnastics.

=== 2013 ===
In July 2013, Maroney made her return to gymnastics at the 2013 Secret U.S. Classic, where she placed first on vault with an average score of 15.425 and third on the floor exercise with a score of 14.350, posting the highest execution score on that apparatus. She then competed on the vault and floor exercise at the U.S. National Championships and won gold in both events.

On September 15, Maroney was one of four gymnasts named to the United States team for the 2013 World Championships in Antwerp, Belgium. She was originally put on the team to compete on the vault and floor exercise, but she was later named to compete as an all-around gymnast alongside Simone Biles and Kyla Ross after performing well during training. Teammate Brenna Dowell was named as an alternate instead, as there could only be three gymnasts competing on each event. In the qualification round, she scored a total all-around score of 57.149, finishing sixth overall, but due to the two-per-country rule, where only two gymnasts from each country can advance to an individual final, she could not compete in the all-around final. She was the top qualifier for the vault final. Also in the qualification round, Maroney finished in sixth place on the floor exercise with the same total score as Ross. Due to Maroney having a lower execution score, Ross progressed to the final. In the vault final, she successfully defended her title, winning the gold medal with an average score of 15.724.

=== 2014–16: Injuries and retirement ===
In March 2014, Maroney underwent arthroscopic surgery on her left knee due to issues related to her previous tibia injury. On August 31, 2014, underage nude images of Maroney were published as part of the 2014 celebrity nude photo leak. She missed the entire 2014 season. In 2015, Maroney shared she had been dealing with adrenal fatigue since 2013, but she had returned to training.

On February 24, 2016, the gymnastics podcast GymCastic released a 49-minute-long interview with Maroney regarding her health issues preceding and following the 2012 Olympic Games. She shared that she had been dealing with depression and burnout. In the interview, she announced her retirement from competitive gymnastics.

== 2017–2019: Larry Nassar sexual abuse case ==
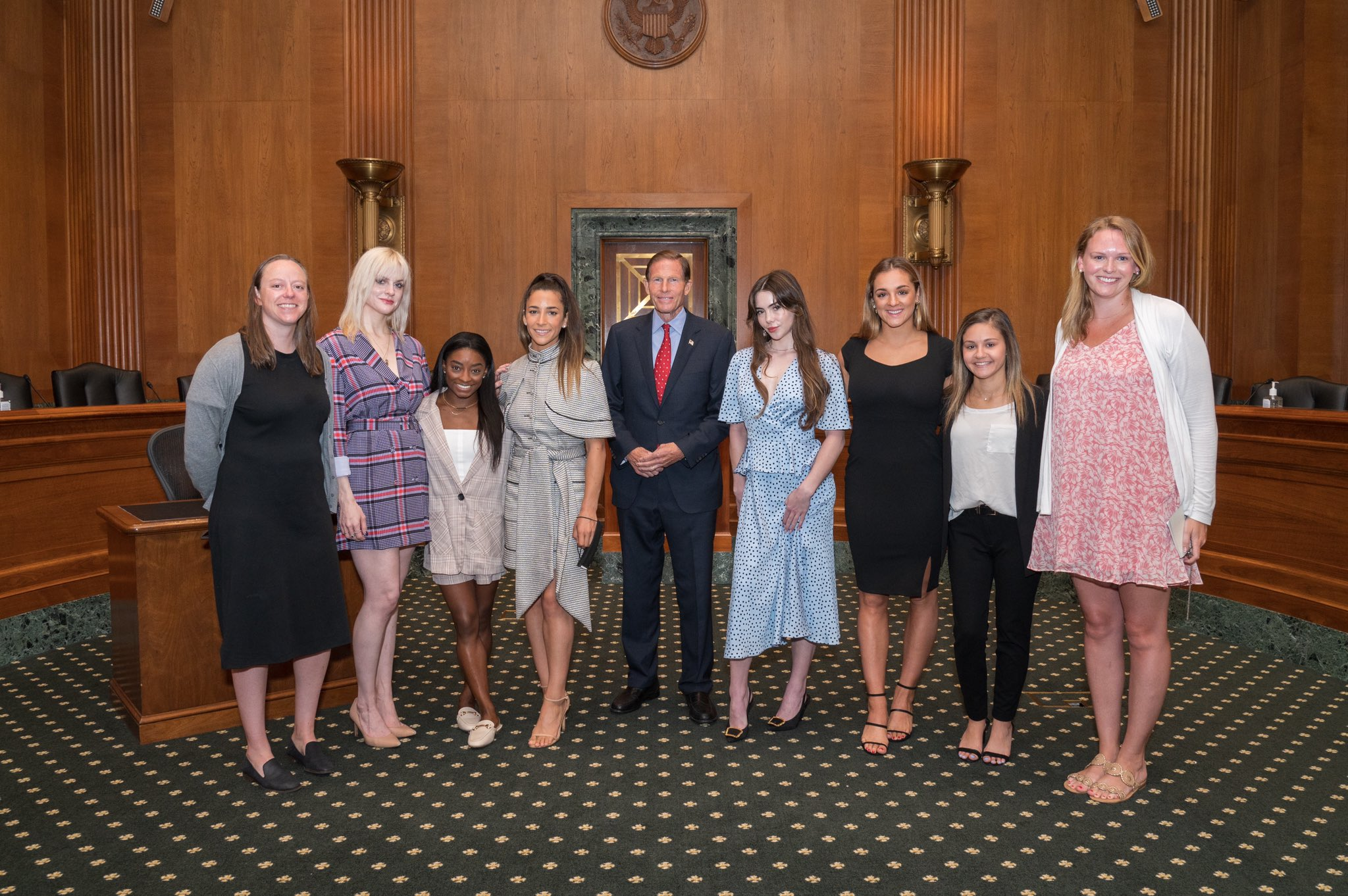
Maroney (fourth from right, wearing blue dress) with other survivors and Richard Blumenthal

On October 18, 2017, Maroney alleged that the USA Gymnastics team physician Larry Nassar had repeatedly molested her, starting when she was 13 years old, until her retirement from the sport in 2016. She made the allegation on Twitter under the #MeToo hashtag. Nassar had been arrested in November 2016 and accused of sexually assaulting female minors throughout his career.

In December 2017, Maroney filed a suit against Nassar, Michigan State University, the United States Olympic Committee and USA Gymnastics, accusing the latter two of covering up the sexual abuse by asking Maroney to sign a $1.25 million confidentiality agreement and not speak about her experiences with Nassar. Maroney had agreed and accepted the money in 2016. During Nassar's sentencing hearing in January 2018, USA Gymnastics waived the agreement, at least temporarily, to allow Maroney to make a victim's statement in court against Nassar, who is now serving a 40-to-175-year prison sentence.

On May 16, 2018, it was announced that Maroney and the other survivors would be awarded the Arthur Ashe Courage Award.

== Post-gymnastics career ==
In the summer of 2016, Maroney announced that she was working on a music career.

=== 2020: Music ===
On March 7, 2020, Maroney released her first official single, "Wake Up Call". She later released two more songs: "Covid Lockdown" and "Spose to Do".

== Acting career ==
Maroney made her acting debut in the CW television series Hart of Dixie on November 20, 2012. She played Tonya, a friend of Rose, in the episode "Baby, Don't Get Hooked on Me". She returned for more episodes that aired in 2013. In December 2013, Maroney appeared on an episode of the Fox TV show Bones called "The Spark in the Park" (season 9), as a gymnast named Ellie who is a suspect in the murder of a fellow gymnast.

On August 19, 2016, Maroney appeared in season 2 episode 1 of the NBC TV show Superstore called "The Olympics" as herself alongside fellow Olympians Tara Lipinski and Apolo Ohno. She appeared in several GEICO television commercials in 2021.

== Competitive history ==
Competitive history of McKayla Maroney at the junior level
Year	Event	Team	AA	VT	UB	BB	FX
2009	U.S. National Championships		27	3rd place, bronze medalist(s)	27	25	29
2010	U.S. Classic		7	2nd place, silver medalist(s)	18	23	5
2010	U.S. National Championships		3rd place, bronze medalist(s)	1st place, gold medalist(s)	24	7	4
2010	Pan American Championships	1st place, gold medalist(s)		1st place, gold medalist(s)			1st place, gold medalist(s)

Competitive history of McKayla Maroney at the senior level
Year	Event	Team	AA	VT	UB	BB	FX
2011	City of Jesolo Trophy	1st place, gold medalist(s)	1st place, gold medalist(s)	1st place, gold medalist(s)	5	5	4
2011	U.S. Classic					6	5
2011	U.S. National Championships		2nd place, silver medalist(s)	1st place, gold medalist(s)	10	7	5
2011	World Championships	1st place, gold medalist(s)		1st place, gold medalist(s)			
2012	City of Jesolo Trophy	1st place, gold medalist(s)	4	1st place, gold medalist(s)			6
2012	U.S. Classic			1st place, gold medalist(s)		10	
2012	U.S. National Championships		DNF				
2012	U.S. Olympic Trials		7	1st place, gold medalist(s)	11	10	5
2012	Olympic Games	1st place, gold medalist(s)		2nd place, silver medalist(s)			
2013	U.S. Classic			1st place, gold medalist(s)			3rd place, bronze medalist(s)
2013	U.S. National Championships			1st place, gold medalist(s)			1st place, gold medalist(s)
2013	World Championships			1st place, gold medalist(s)			

== Filmography ==
=== Television ===
Year	Title	Role	Notes
2012–15	Hart of Dixie	Tonya	6 episodes
2012	Big Brother 14	Herself	1 episode
2013	Bones	Ellie	Episode: "The Spark in the Park"
2016	Superstore	Herself	Episode: "Olympics"

== See also ==
- Gymnastics at the 2012 Summer Olympics
- United States at the 2012 Summer Olympics
