= 2015 U.S. Classic =

32nd edition of the U.S. Classic

2015 Secret U.S. Classic
- Venue: Sears Centre Arena
- Location: Chicago, Illinois, U.S.
- Dates: July 25, 2015

Medalists
| gold medal | Simone Biles; Laurie Hernandez |
| silver medal | Gabby Douglas; Ragan Smith |
| bronze medal | Maggie Nichols; Jazmyn Foberg |

The 2015 U.S. Classic, officially the 2015 Secret U.S. Classic, is the 32nd edition of the U.S. Classic and was held on July 25, 2015 at Sears Centre Arena in Chicago.

The event served as a qualification event to the 2015 U.S. National Gymnastics Championships, later in August 2015. It was the second event during the 2015 USA Gymnastics elite season.

== Medalists ==
| Event | Gold | Silver | Bronze |
|---|---|---|---|
Senior
| All-Around | Simone Biles | Gabby Douglas | Maggie Nichols |
| Vault | Simone Biles | Mykayla Skinner | none awarded |
| Uneven Bars | Madison Kocian | Gabby Douglas | Bailie Key |
| Balance Beam | Simone Biles | Aly Raisman | Gabby Douglas |
| Floor Exercise | Simone Biles | Gabby Douglas | Maggie Nichols; Bailie Key |
Junior
| All-Around | Laurie Hernandez | Ragan Smith | Jazmyn Foberg |
| Vault | Laurie Hernandez | Jazmyn Foberg | Ragan Smith; Chae Campbell; Grace Quinn |
| Uneven Bars | Laurie Hernandez | Morgan Hurd | Jazmyn Foberg; Jordan Chiles |
| Balance Beam | Jazmyn Foberg | Deanne Soza | Laurie Hernandez |
| Floor Exercise | Ragan Smith | Christina Desiderio | Laurie Hernandez; Deanne Soza |

== Event information ==
The 32nd edition of the U.S. Classic, in 2015, was held at the Sears Centre Arena, just outside Chicago, in Hoffman Estates, Illinois. This is the third time it was held at the arena but the event has been held in Chicago since 2010, when it was hosted at the UIC Pavilion.

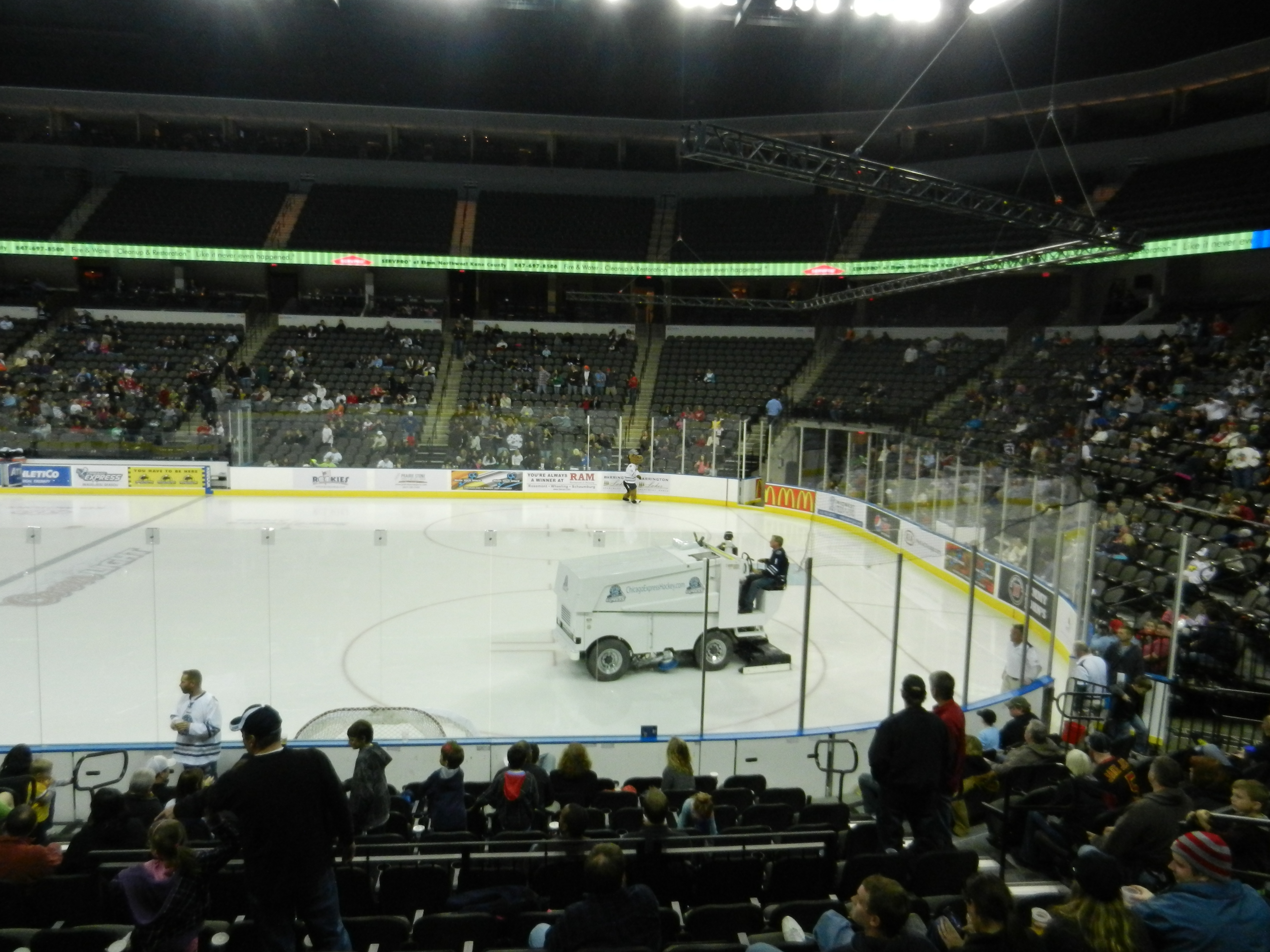
The interior of the Sears Centre Arena, the venue of the 2015 event

The Junior session started at 13:00pm CT and the Senior session started at 18:30pm CT.

=== Sponsorship ===
The 2015 U.S. Classic was the third edition of the event under the title sponsorship of American deodorant brand, Secret.

=== Broadcast ===
Universal Sports own the broadcasting rights to all USA Gymnastics events and broadcast the Senior competition only, as normal.

== Qualification to the Classic ==
To advance to the U.S. Classic and qualify to international elite status, a gymnast must have either;

- scored 53.00 (Sr.) or 51.50 (Jr.) at the 2014 P&G U.S. National Championships
- scored 53.00 (Sr.) or 51.50 (Jr.) at a 2015 National Qualifier event
- be a U.S. National team member and represented the U.S. at an international assignment

== Qualification to Nationals ==
The 2015 U.S. Classic was a qualifier to the 2015 P&G U.S. National Championships in Indianapolis, Indiana. In order to qualify to U.S. Nationals from this year's classic, senior gymnasts must score 54.00 and juniors must score 52.50.

== Results ==
=== Seniors ===
| Rank | Gymnast | Gym | Vault (gymnastics) | Uneven bars | Balance beam | Floor (gymnastics) | Total |
|---|---|---|---|---|---|---|---|
| 1st place, gold medalist(s) | Simone Biles | World Champions Centre | 16.000 | 15.100 | 15.250 | 16.050 | 62.400 |
| 2nd place, silver medalist(s) | Gabby Douglas | Buckeye Gymnastics | 15.200 | 15.400 | 14.900 | 15.000 | 60.500 |
| 3rd place, bronze medalist(s) | Maggie Nichols | Twin City Twisters | 15.800 | 14.950 | 14.450 | 14.800 | 60.000 |
| 4 | Bailie Key | Texas Dreams Gymnastics | 14.900 | 15.300 | 14.450 | 14.800 | 59.450 |
| 5 | Aly Raisman | Brestyan's American Gymnastics | 15.400 | 14.200 | 15.100 | 14.350 | 59.050 |
| 6 | Alyssa Baumann | World Olympic Gymnastics Academy | 14.550 | 14.500 | 13.750 | 14.150 | 56.950 |
| 7 | Mykayla Skinner | Desert Lights Gymnastics | 15.100 | 14.100 | 12.800 | 13.500 | 55.500 |
| 8 | Lexy Ramler | KidSport | 13.550 | 12.800 | 12.750 | 13.400 | 52.500 |
| 9 | Alaina Kwan | All Olympia Gymnastics Center | 13.900 | 11.500 | 12.400 | 14.000 | 51.800 |
| 10 | Taylor Lawson | Parkettes Gymnastics | 13.300 | 12.800 | 13.000 | 12.650 | 51.750 |
| 11 | Kylie Dickson | All Olympia Gymnastics Center | 14.150 | 11.750 | 12.000 | 13.650 | 51.550 |
| 12 | Nia Dennis | Legacy Elite Gymnastics | 15.000 | 14.500 | 14.200 | – | 43.700 |
| 13 | Madison Kocian | World Olympic Gymnastics Academy | – | 15.600 | 13.850 | – | 29.450 |
| 14 | Kyla Ross | Gym-Max Gymnastics | – | 12.250 | 14.450 | – | 26.800 |
| 15 | Lauren Navarro | Charter Oak Gymnastics | – | 12.500 | 14.100 | – | 26.600 |
| 16 | Polina Shchennikova | TIGAR | – | 14.000 | 12.250 | – | 26.250 |
| 17 | Brenna Dowell | Great American Gymnastics Express | – | 14.350 | 11.800 | – | 26.150 |
| 18 | Sabrina Vega | Great American Gymnastics Express | – | – | 12.500 | 13.200 | 25.700 |

== Participants ==
=== Seniors ===
There were 20 gymnasts competing in the senior division.

- Kyla Ross
- Maggie Nichols
- Marissa Oakley
- Taylor Lawson
- Aly Raisman
- Lexy Ramler
- Sabrina Vega
- Gabby Douglas
- Brenna Dowell
- Polina Shchennikova
- Lauren Navarro
- Alaina Kwan
- Kylie Dickson
- Nia Dennis
- Ashton Locklear
- Bailie Key
- Madison Kocian
- Simone Biles
- MyKayla Skinner
- Alyssa Baumann

=== Juniors ===
There were 37 gymnasts competing in the junior division.

- Ragan Smith
- Caitlin Smith
- Morgan Hurd
- Abigail Walker
- Sydney Johnson-Scharpf
- Jordan Chiles
- Grace Quinn
- Colbi Flory
- Olivia Dunne
- Elena Arenas
- Emma Malabuyo
- Aria Brusch
- Chae Campbell
- Maile O'Keefe
- Kaitlin De Guzman
- Maggie Musselman
- Gabby Perea
- Jaylene Gilstrap
- Deanne Soza
- Jazmyn Foberg
- Lauren Hernandez
- Adriana Popp
- Megan Freed
- Hannah Joyner
- Alyssa Al-Ashari
- Trinity Thomas
- Tienna Nguyen
- Madison Rau
- Christina Desiderio
- Shania Adams
- Adeline Kenlin
- Tori Tatum
- Abby Paulson
- Anna Huber
- Alyona Shchennikova
- Emily Gaskins
- Shilese Jones
