= Full twisting layout =

A full twisting layout, also called a full twist or a full, is a gymnastics move. The layout requires an extended body while flipping upside down; while the full-twist requires a 360-degree rotation, Because it combines flipping and twisting simultaneously, it is an advanced move.

== Skills ==
In order to be in good condition to execute this skill, some skills are recommended; these include: roundoff, back handspring, back tuck, layout, and a half twisting layout. The skill absolutely required in learning a full-twisting layout, is a proficiency in a back layout. Back layouts are commonly performed in a tumbling pass and oftentimes preceded by a round-off back handspring.

== Standing Twist ==
The full-twisting layout is a complex skill and requires professional coaching. The standing twist is a drill to aid with body awareness. Practicing this skill requires a perfect alignment of the body along the long axis. The long axis is an imaginary line running through the center of the body from head to toe. The purpose of the skill is to practice landing exactly how you started; arms over your head, feet together, and your body tightened and straight. Practicing the standing twist helps you gain awareness in the air. This awareness prevents you from getting directionally lost in the air. It is recommended to start with a half twist, and then progress to a full twist.

== Twisting on the Floor ==
The use of additional matting on the floor, can aid in injury prevention. To start, gymnasts can attempt half-twists on the floor exercise. Once the half-twist layout is comfortable, a gymnast can then attempt a full-twisting layout.

== Cautions ==
The full-twisting layout is a complex skill and requires professional coaching. Trampolines add height to tumbling and have much more give. Special attention to speed and power is required when transferring the full-twist to the floor which is much more stiff. A focus on speed and power helps prevent injury low landings or incomplete rotations

== Popularity ==
This skill is introduced in floor routines in levels 6 and 7. It is legal for competition in level 7. It is typically not done on the beam until later levels, but it is commonly done as a vault, in the form of a Yurchenko or Tsukahara. This is one of the basic skills in the upper levels of gymnastics. This skill is also popular in Power Tumbling. It is not required until level nine, but may be included in a tumbling pass as early as level 7. In Allstar Cheerleading, full twisting layouts are legal level 5 and above.
