= Pekin High School =

Pekin High School may refer to:

- Pekin Community High School (Illinois), a public school and district in Pekin, Tazewell County, Illinois
- Eastern High School (Pekin, Indiana), a public school in Pekin, Washington County, Indiana
- Pekin Community High School (Iowa), a public high school in Pekin, Jefferson County, Iowa
