= Pacific Coast Railroad =

Pacific Coast Railroad may refer to:

- Pacific Coast Railway, a former narrow-gauge system near San Luis Obispo, California
- Pacific Coast Railroad (Washington), a former line near Seattle
- Pacific Coast Railroad (tourist) in Santa Margarita, California
