= Deanne Soza =

American artistic gymnast (born 2001)

- Born: September 24, 2001 (age 24) Orem, Utah, United States

Gymnastics career
- Discipline: Women's artistic gymnastics
- Country represented: United States
- College team: Utah Red Rocks
- Gym: Texas Dreams Gymnastics (2016-2020); Arete Gymnastics (until 2016)
- Head coach: Kim Zmeskal-Burdette
- Assistant coach: Chris Burdette
- Former coaches: Dan Coleman (until 2016)
- Music: 2013-2014: He’s a Pirate from Pirates of the Caribbean
- Retired: October 21, 2020
Medal record
Representing the United States

Deanne Soza (born September 24, 2001 in Orem, Utah) is a former American artistic gymnast.

== Competitive History ==
=== 2013 ===
Soza competed at the 2013 Secret U.S. Classic, placing 16th all-around. She advanced to Nationals, where she accumulated a two-day score of 103.050, placing 26th.

=== 2014 ===
Deanne kicked off the 2014 season finishing third at the American Classic, held at the Karolyi's Ranch.

Soza later competed at the Secret U.S. Classic, where she placed third with Norah Flatley. She also took home a silver on uneven bars and a bronze on vault.

Soza was expected to compete at the 2014 P&G Championships in Pittsburgh, Pennsylvania.

In September 2014, Deanne contracted a rare eye infection which could have blinded her. She healed fully and resumed training.

=== 2015 ===
Soza returned to competition at the 2015 U.S. Classic on July 25. She placed fifth in the junior all-around competition with a score of 55.550, including second on balance beam with a score of 14.5 and tied for third on floor exercise (with Laurie Hernandez) with a score of 14.350. These scores were sufficient for her to once again qualify to the P&G National Championships.

=== 2016 ===
In January 2016, FloGymnastics released an article that revealed that Soza could have died as a result of her eye infection.
