= Norah Flatley =

American artistic gymnast

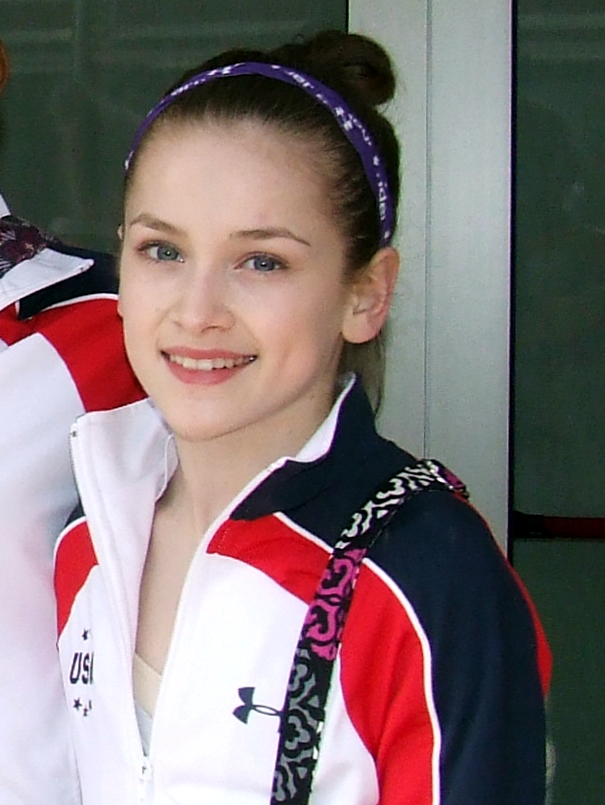
- Flatley at the 2014 City of Jesolo Trophy

Personal information
- Full name: Norah Irene Flatley
- Born: March 10, 2000 (age 26) San Diego, California, United States
- Height: 150 cm (4 ft 11 in)
- Spouse: Justin Garces (m. 2024)

Gymnastics career
- Discipline: Women's artistic gymnastics
- Country represented: United States (2013–2015)
- College team: UCLA Bruins (2019–22); Arkansas Razorbacks (2023)
- Club: Chow's Gymnastics
- Head coach: Jordyn Wieber
- Former coaches: Liang Chow; Valorie Kondos Field; Randy Lane; Chris Waller
- Choreographer: Dominic Zito; BJ Das
- Retired: July 21, 2017 (elite)
Medal record
Representing United States
Pacific Rim Championships
Gold medal – first place	2014 Richmond	Team
Gold medal – first place	2014 Richmond	Balance Beam
Representing UCLA Bruins
NCAA Championships
Bronze medal – third place	2019 Fort Worth	Team

Norah Irene Flatley (born March 10, 2000, in San Diego, California) is an American former artistic gymnast. She is the 2014 Pacific Rim junior balance beam champion. She previously competed for the UCLA Bruins and also competed for the Arkansas Razorbacks.

== Early life ==
Norah Flatley was born on March 10, 2000, in San Diego to Terrence Flatley and Ann McKenzie. She is the youngest of four children.

One of Flatley's sisters, Anna, was a competitive gymnast, and at the age of four Flatley wanted to join her. She enrolled in gymnastics classes at Salto Gymnastics in Wisconsin. Naturally gifted, Flatley made both the 2007 and 2009 National TOPs teams. In 2010, Flatley was both Level 8 State (WI) and Regional (4) champion for her age category. In the summer of 2010 her family relocated to Cumming, Iowa, in order for her to train under the tutelage of Liang Chow, the former coach of 2008 Olympic balance beam champion Shawn Johnson. A year later, in 2011, she was crowned Level 9 Regional Champion. At her first Level 9 Western Championships – at the age of eleven, Flatley was crowned the individual champion in the all-around, on beam and floor.

== Gymnastics career ==
=== Level 10: 2012 ===
Flatley moved up to Level 10 for the 2012 competitive season. She was State champion, and was second at Regionals. In May, she participated in her first ever J.O. Nationals – held in Hampton, Virginia. She tied for third in the all-around with Chow's club teammate Alexis Vasquez, and Southeastern gymnast Grace Glenn. However, she won the balance beam title with a score of 9.725.

=== Junior elite: 2013–2015 ===
Flatley qualified to Junior International Elite status in 2013. She qualified to the 2013 U.S. Classic in Chicago and placed fourth in the all-around and won gold on balance beam. Flatley scored the highest balance beam score (15.2) of the meet within both senior and junior divisions. At the 2013 U.S. National Gymnastics Championships, Flatley accumulated a two-day all-around score of 112.400, placing fifth overall. She won silver on balance beam behind Bailie Key. As a result she was named to the junior national team.

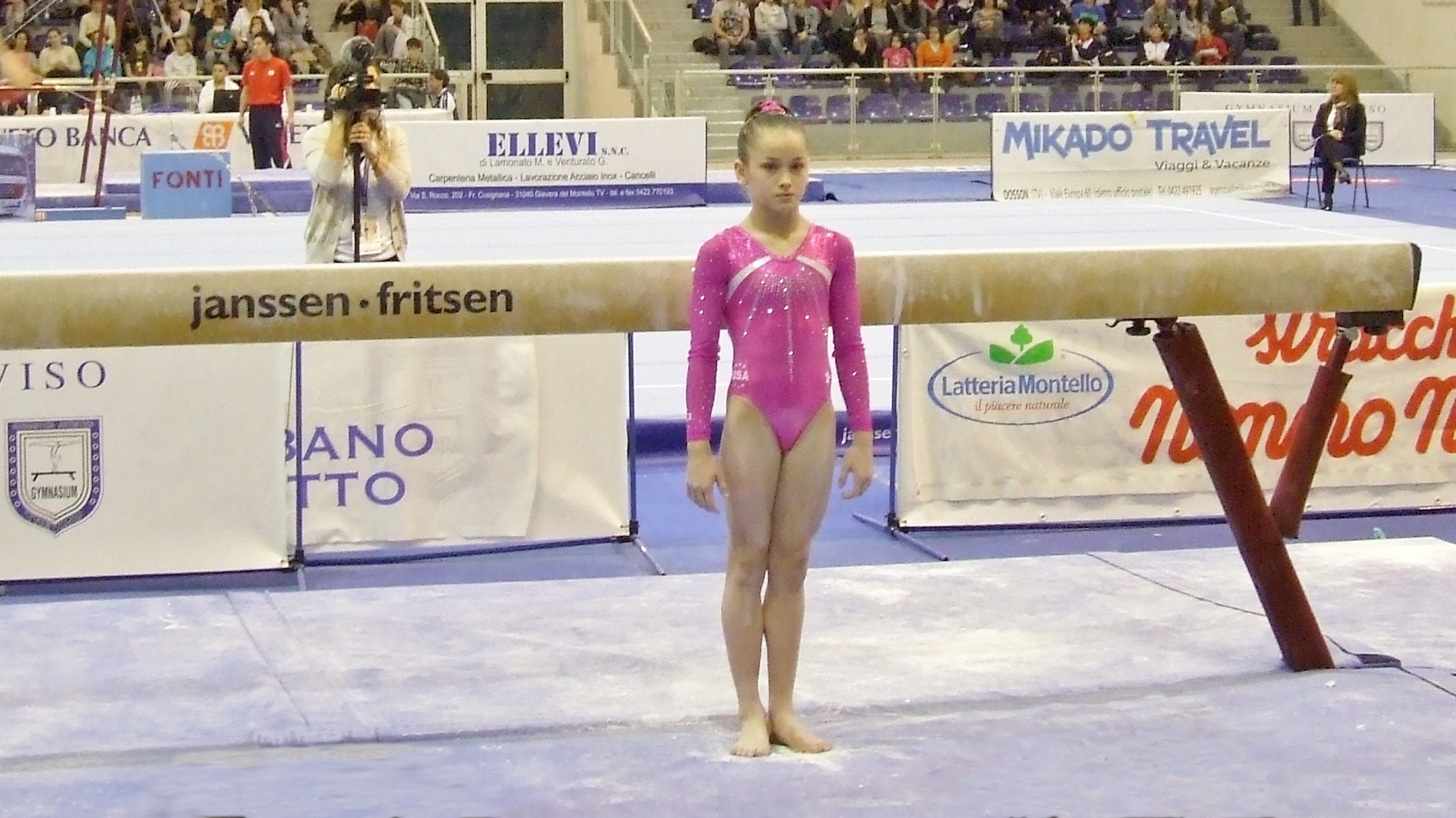
Flatley at the 2014 City of Jesolo Trophy

Flatley made her international debut at the 2014 City of Jesolo Trophy competition in Jesolo, Italy. She helped team USA win gold. Individually she placed third in the all-around behind Bailie Key and Nia Dennis and won gold on balance beam. She next competed at the Pacific Rim Championships in April in Richmond, Canada. While there she won team gold and gold on the balance beam. At the 2014 U.S. Classic Flatley placed third in the all-around, tied with Deanne Soza and behind Jordan Chiles and Dennis. In August Flately competed at the National Championships. She finished third in the all-around behind Jazmyn Foberg and Dennis. Additionally she won silver on the uneven bars behind Foberg and placed fourth on balance beam.

Flatley competed her last year as a Junior International Elite in the 2015 season. At the 2015 City of Jesolo Trophy she helped the USA finish first as a team. Individually she won gold on balance beam and silver in the all-around and on the uneven bars, behind Laurie Hernandez on each. Due to a foot injury, Flatley missed the U.S. Classic and the U.S. National Championships.

On October 7, 2015, Flately announced her verbal commitment to the UCLA Bruins gymnastics program, through her Instagram account.

=== Retirement from elite: 2016–2017 ===
Flatley was set for her Senior International debut in 2016 but withdrew from all competitions for reason of injury. On July 21, 2017, she announced her retirement from elite gymnastics and announced plans to move down to Level 10 for the 2018 season.

== Collegiate gymnastics career ==
=== 2018–2019 season ===
In the fall of 2018, Flatley began attending the University of California, Los Angeles, joining the gymnastics team.

Flatley competed on uneven bars and balance beam in every meet of her freshman season. She was named the Pac-12 Freshman of the Week on February 26. She helped her team to a third-place finish at the 2019 NCAA Championships, contributing scores on beam and bars of 9.8875 and 9.9 respectively.

=== 2019–2020 season ===
Flatley regularly contributed to the uneven bars, balance beam, and floor exercise lineups before the season got cut short due to the COVID-19 pandemic.

=== 2020–2021 season ===
While warming up for UCLA's season-opening meet against Arizona State, Flatley suffered an ankle injury that kept her out of competition until the postseason. She returned to the uneven bars lineup at the Pac-12 Championship, scoring 9.875. She competed uneven bars and balance beam at the regional championships, but UCLA failed to qualify to nationals.

=== 2021–2022 season ===
Fully recovered from the previous season's ankle injury, Flatley competed in at least three events during every meet of the regular season, including six times in the all-around.

At the regional finals, Flatley competed only on the vault and uneven bars, citing mental health reasons. UCLA again failed to qualify to the national championships as a team, finishing just 0.025 points behind the second-place qualifying Missouri Tigers. However, Flatley's all-around score of 39.575 from the regional semifinals qualified her to nationals as an individual in the all-around.

At the national championships, Flatley placed seventh in the all-around with a score of 39.6 and fourth on the balance beam with a score of 9.9375.

=== 2022–2023 season ===
Following the 2022 National Championships it was reported by gymnastics podcast GymCastic that Flatley, who has a fifth year of NCAA eligibility due to the COVID-19 pandemic, had entered the transfer portal. On May 31, 2022 it was announced that Flately would be joining the Arkansas Razorbacks gymnastics team, reuniting with former UCLA teammate Kyla Ross, as assistant coach for the team.

Flatley made her debut for Arkansas on January 7, 2023 in a meet against Nebraska. Flatley competed on vault, uneven bars, and balance beam towards Arkansas' victory. Individually Flatley posted the highest score on uneven bars and co-highest score on vault.

Following the 2023 SEC Championship, she was awarded All-SEC honours on vault, floor and all-around.

=== Regular season ranking ===
Season	All-Around	Vault	Uneven Bars	Balance Beam	Floor Exercise
2019	N/A	N/A	14th	32nd	N/A
2020	N/A	N/A	80th	36th	245th
2021	N/A				
2022	33rd	129th	24th	116th	80th
2023	N/A	103rd	35th	33rd	N/A

== Personal life ==
Flatley has been in a relationship with Atlanta United FC soccer player Justin Garces since November 2018. They married in July 2024.

== Competitive history ==
Year	Event	Team	AA	VT	UB	BB	FX
Junior elite
2013	US Classic		4	12	4	1st place, gold medalist(s)	20
2013	P&G Gymnastics Championships		5	15	6	2nd place, silver medalist(s)	13
2014	City of Jesolo Trophy	1st place, gold medalist(s)	3rd place, bronze medalist(s)			2nd place, silver medalist(s)	
2014	Pacific Rim Championships	1st place, gold medalist(s)			4	1st place, gold medalist(s)	
2014	US Classic		3rd place, bronze medalist(s)	17	3rd place, bronze medalist(s)	1st place, gold medalist(s)	15
2014	P&G Gymnastics Championships		3rd place, bronze medalist(s)	15	2nd place, silver medalist(s)	4	10
2015	City of Jesolo Trophy	1st place, gold medalist(s)	2nd place, silver medalist(s)		2nd place, silver medalist(s)	1st place, gold medalist(s)	
NCAA
2019	PAC-12 Championships	1st place, gold medalist(s)			23	10	
2019	NCAA Championships	3rd place, bronze medalist(s)					
2020	PAC-12 Championships	Canceled due to the COVID-19 pandemic in the USA					
2020	NCAA Championships	Canceled due to the COVID-19 pandemic in the USA					
2021	PAC-12 Championships	3rd place, bronze medalist(s)					
2022	PAC-12 Championships	4	5		10	5	
2022	NCAA Championships		7	14	19	4	29
2023	SEC Championships	7	8	7	22	31	10
