= 2015 USA Gymnastics elite season =

- League: USA Gymnastics
- Sport: Artistic gymnastics
- Duration: May–August 2015
- Games: 4
- TV partner: NBC Sports
- Season champions: Simone Biles; Sam Mikulak

USA Gymnastics elite seasons seasons
- ← 2014 2016

The 2015 USA Gymnastics elite season consists of the domestic artistic gymnastics events that will take place during the summer of 2015, thus forming the elite season. The season will take place from May 29-August 16, 2015, consisting of four events; two elite qualifiers, one women's classic and the U.S. National Championships. During the elite season, the 2015 Pan American Games are taking place in Toronto, Ontario, Canada. This doesn't clash with any elite season competitions.

== Calendar of events ==
Below is the calendar of events during the season.

Event	Date	Men / Women	Location
American Classic	May 29–31	Women	Karolyi Ranch
Men's National Qualifier	July 16–19	Men	USOTC
Secret U.S. Classic	July 24–25	Women	Sears Centre
U.S. Nationals	August 13–16	Men / Women	Bankers Life Fieldhouse

== Qualification ==
=== Women ===
	U.S. Classic	U.S. Nationals
Junior	51.50 at 2014 Nationals or 51.50 at 2015 National Qualifiers	52.50 at 2015 Secret Classic or National Team member
Senior	53.00 at 2014 Nationals or 53.00 at 2015 National Qualifiers	2014 Worlds or 2015 Pan Ams team member, 54.00 at 2015 Secret Classic
