= Galina Marinova (artistic gymnast) =

Bulgarian gymnast (born 1964)

- Галина Маринова
- Born: 1 November 1964 (age 61)
- Height: 155 cm (5 ft 1 in)

Gymnastics career
- Discipline: Women's artistic gymnastics
- Country represented: Bulgaria

Galina Marinova (Bulgarian: Галина Маринова, born 1 November 1964) is a retired Bulgarian gymnast who competed at the 1980 Summer Olympics and was the 1981 Bulgarian national champion. She now works as a coach.

== Personal life ==
Marinova married Orlin Petrov in 1994. They have a daughter, Marilyn, named for Marilyn Monroe.

== Competitive career ==
Marinova was coached by Liliana Stoyanova for her entire career.

In 1979, she competed at the World Championships, where she entered the all-around final and finished in 33rd place. The following year, she represented Bulgaria at the 1980 Summer Olympics, where she placed 21st in the all-around.

In 1981, she was the Bulgarian national champion. She competed at the 1981 World Championships, where she again made the all-around final and placed 18th. She also qualified for the floor exercise final, where she was 8th. Two years later, she competed at the 1983 European Championships and finished in 10th. She also tied for 6th in the uneven bars final with fellow Bulgarian Zoya Grancharova.

Marinova retired following the 1983 World Championships, where she had intended to compete. She was having back pain at the time, and the team doctor accidentally reused a needle when giving her an injection to help. Marinova began to feel ill and was sent home; she had contracted hepatitis from the shot. She struggled to train due to fatigue, and after the Soviet boycott of the 1984 Summer Olympics was announced, Marinova began to train less intensely before deciding to retire for the sake of her health.

== Post-competitive career ==
Marinova graduated from the National Sports Academy "Vasil Levski". She wished to live in Sofia, where she had trained, but she found after her graduation that she was not allowed to do so as she did not have residency. Marinova had visited Los Angeles in 1984 prior to the boycotted Olympics and liked it so much that she decided to move there instead.

She moved to the United States in 1990. She coached in Santa Monica, California for several years before she opened her own gym, All Olympia Gymnastics Center, in Calabasas, California in 2000. She runs the gym with Artur Akopyan.

As a coach, her students have included Mohini Bhardwaj, who Marinova helped coach to the 2004 Summer Olympics team, Mattie Larson, who competed at the 2010 World Championships, and McKayla Maroney, who was a two-time vault world champion and won two medals at the 2012 Summer Olympics.

Marinova, along with Akopyan, was a party to multiple lawsuits in 2018, which alleged that they were abusive and had contributed to the environment that allowed and encouraged sexual abuse of their gymnasts by Larry Nassar; both Larson and Maroney had been abused by him. Gymnasts alleged that Marinova forbid gymnasts from drinking water during training, engaged in body-shaming, encouraged gymnasts to skip meals, and punished injured gymnasts by ignoring them. They closed one of their gym locations in Hawthorne, California. A SafeSport investigation of both coaches was initially closed in 2022 due to lack of witnesses but was reopened in 2024. In October 2026, she was given a one-year suspension from coaching.
