= Alyssa Baumann =

American artistic gymnast (born 1998)

- Full name: Alyssa Lyn Baumann
- Born: May 17, 1998 (age 28) Dallas, Texas, U.S.

Gymnastics career
- Discipline: Women's artistic gymnastics
- Country represented: United States (2013–2017)
- College team: Florida Gators (2018–22)
- Club: WOGA
- Head coach: Laurent Landi
- Assistant coach: Cecile Canqueteau-Landi
- Choreographer: Cecile Canqueteau-Landi
- Retired: April 22, 2022
Medal record
Representing United States
World Championships
Gold medal – first place	2014 Nanning	Team
Representing Florida Gators
NCAA Championships
Silver medal – second place	2022 Fort Worth	Team
Bronze medal – third place	2018 St. Louis	Team
Bronze medal – third place	2018 St. Louis	Floor Exercise

Alyssa Lyn Baumann (born May 17, 1998) is a retired American artistic gymnast. She was a member of the gold medal-winning team at the 2014 World Championships, and is the 2014 and 2015 US Championships silver medalist on the balance beam. She competed in NCAA gymnastics for the University of Florida.

== Career ==
=== Senior International Elite ===
==== 2014 ====
In her first year at senior level, Baumann represented the United States at the 2014 City of Jesolo Trophy in Italy. Baumann placed first in the team competition and second on the balance beam.

At the 2014 P&G National Championships, she placed fourth in the all-around. She also tied for second on balance beam with Simone Biles, placed fourth on floor, and ninth on bars. Baumann was named to the United States' national team and was chosen to compete as a member of the 2014 Pan American Championships team, but she withdrew from the event due to a hyperextended elbow injury.

Baumann was selected to compete at the 2014 World Championships in Nanning, China, where she contributed toward the team gold medal on balance beam, her only event during the Team Final, and scored a 14.500.

==== 2015 ====
On July 25, 2015. Baumann competed at the Secret U.S. Classic and finished 6th in the all-around with a score of 56.950, behind Simone Biles, Gabby Douglas, Maggie Nichols, Bailie Key, and Aly Raisman, and ahead of Mykayla Skinner. She started on beam where she fell on her switch ring leap, scoring a 13.750 and finishing 10th on the event, 0.1 behind WOGA teammate Madison Kocian. She scored a 14.150 on floor, finishing 6th and a 14.500 on vault following a low, under-rotated double-twisting Yurchenko. She finished on uneven bars and scored a 14.500, finishing 6th on the event.

On August 13 & 15, Baumann competed at the 2015 P&G Championships in Indianapolis, Indiana, and placed 7th in the All-Around with a 2-night total score of 115.700, tying with Mykayla Skinner.

On Night 1, Baumann started on beam with a highly difficult routine, which included a stuck standing Arabian and an Onodi connected to a wolf jump; she scored a 15.150, the highest beam score of that night. On floor, she had a sub-par performance that included a wobble on her Memmel (double Y-turn). She scored a 13.900. She under-rotated her double-twisting Yurchenko and scored a 14.300. Her last event was the uneven bars, where she had a well-executed routine and scored a 14.500. At the end of the night she was 6th in the all-around with a score of 57.850.

On Night 2, Baumann started on floor. She stumbled out of her double turn with her leg at horizontal and missed a connection (she connects it to a single Y-turn). She scored a low 13.700 with a 5.7 start value (compared to 5.9 on Night 1). Her total of 27.600 placed her 9th on the event. On vault, she had a better landing on her double-twisting Yurchenko (with a small hop backwards) and scored a 15.050. On bars, she had trouble on her Pak Salto transition and came slightly in contact with the floor (her left foot swept the ground) and scored a 14.050, totaling to 28.550 and placing 10th on the event. She ended her night on beam where she performed well, despite a wobble on her Onodi wolf jump connection. She scored a 15.050 and had a 2-night total of 30.200, placing 2nd on the event behind Biles and ahead of Kyla Ross.

Baumann was named to the Senior National Team and received an invitation to the 2015 Worlds Selection Camp in September.

==== 2016 ====
Baumann went into the 2016 season as a third-year senior.

On June 4, Baumann competed at the Secret U.S. Classic in Hartford, CT. She scored a 14.750 on vault, a 13.150 on uneven bars, a 15.350 on balance beam, and a 14.750 on floor exercise. Her total score was a 58.000, putting her in third place behind Alexandra Raisman and Rachel Gowey.

On June 24 and 26, Baumann competed at the P&G Championships in St. Louis, Missouri. On night one, she scored a 14.700 on vault, a 12.750 on uneven bars, a 15.000 on balance beam, and a 14.500 on floor exercise, giving her a total score of 56.950. On night two, she scored a 15.000 on vault, a 14.450 on uneven bars, a 14.700 on balance beam, and a 13.850 on floor exercise giving her a total score of 58.000. Her overall score for the event was 114.950, putting her in seventh all-around.

On June 30, Baumann announced that while in training, she had hurt her elbow and would require surgery. It was later reported that she had torn several ligaments and muscles in her elbow and needed immediate surgery after falling off the uneven bars while training. As a result, she withdrew from the Olympic Trials, which took place on July 8–10 in San Jose, California. This ended her petition to the 2016 Rio de Janeiro Olympics.

Baumann's commitment to the University of Florida's gymnastics program was postponed as she announced that she would be deferring until the 2017–18 academic year in order to concentrate on rehab. Later that summer Baumann had another surgery, this time on her wrist, and spent the remainder of 2016 in rehabilitation.

=== Collegiate ===
==== 2018 ====
Baumann started competing for the University of Florida's gymnastics team in the 2018 season. She was the SEC Conference balance beam champion, while Florida finished third. At the NCAA Championships, Florida once again finished third, and individually Baumann won bronze on the floor exercise behind Katelyn Ohashi and Maggie Nichols.

==== 2019 ====
Baumann missed Florida's opening match against Missouri after she fell while training uneven bars. She was taken to a hospital for a precautionary evaluation. She returned to competition the following week. During the Regional Finals, the Florida Gators lost, being upset by the Denver Pioneers and the Oregon State Beavers. They did not qualify as a team to compete at the 2019 NCAA Championships. Baumann, however, qualified as an individual on the balance beam.

== Personal life ==
Baumann was born on May 17, 1998, in Dallas, Texas, to parents, Greg and Jarol Baumann. She has two sisters, Rachel and Kaylee. Rachel is an elite gymnast and trained alongside Alyssa at WOGA.

In 2015, Baumann was diagnosed with coeliac disease. Baumann graduated in 2022 from the University of Florida, where she was a member of their gymnastics team. She was studying sports management.

In November 2018, Baumann reported that she was a survivor of sexual abuse by Dr. Larry Nassar. Her admission was one of hundreds by young women in the USA Gymnastics sex abuse scandal that was first reported in September 2016 by the Indianapolis Star. Nassar was convicted of both federal and state charges and sentenced to 275 years in prison.

== Competitive history ==
Year	Event	Team	AA	VT	UB	BB	FX
Junior
2010	Visa Championships					23	
2010	Voronin Cup		5				
2013	WOGA Classic	1st place, gold medalist(s)					2nd place, silver medalist(s)
2013	American Classic		2nd place, silver medalist(s)	4	2nd place, silver medalist(s)		4
2013	Secret U.S. Classic		7		7		4
2013	P&G Championships		7		9	7	5
Senior
2014	WOGA Classic	1st place, gold medalist(s)		2nd place, silver medalist(s)	3rd place, bronze medalist(s)	1st place, gold medalist(s)	
2014	City of Jesolo Trophy	1st place, gold medalist(s)	6			2nd place, silver medalist(s)	
2014	Secret U.S. Classic		7		9	5	9
2014	P&G Championships		4		9	2nd place, silver medalist(s)	4
2014	World Championships	1st place, gold medalist(s)					
2015	City of Jesolo Trophy	1st place, gold medalist(s)	5			2nd place, silver medalist(s)	
2015	Secret U.S. Classic		6		6	10	6
2015	P&G Championships		7		10	2nd place, silver medalist(s)	9
2016	Secret U.S. Classic		3rd place, bronze medalist(s)	4	18	2nd place, silver medalist(s)	2nd place, silver medalist(s)
2016	P&G Championships		7		17	4	11
NCAA
2018	SEC Championships	3rd place, bronze medalist(s)				1st place, gold medalist(s)	8
2018	NCAA Championships	3rd place, bronze medalist(s)					3rd place, bronze medalist(s)
2019	SEC Championships	2nd place, silver medalist(s)				1st place, gold medalist(s)	2nd place, silver medalist(s)
2019	NCAA Championships					41	
2020	SEC Championships	Canceled due to the COVID-19 pandemic in the USA					
2020	NCAA Championships	Canceled due to the COVID-19 pandemic in the USA					
2021	SEC Championships	3rd place, bronze medalist(s)				1st place, gold medalist(s)	9
2021	NCAA Championships	4					
2022	SEC Championships	1st place, gold medalist(s)				2nd place, silver medalist(s)	23
2022	NCAA Championships	2nd place, silver medalist(s)					

== See also ==
- List of people diagnosed with coeliac disease
