= Jazmyn Foberg =

American artistic gymnast

- Nickname: Jazzy
- Born: February 2, 2000 (age 26) Toms River, New Jersey, U.S.

Gymnastics career
- Discipline: Women's artistic gymnastics
- Country represented: United States (2014–2015)
- Club: MG Elite
- Head coach: Maggie Haney
- Assistant coach: Victoria Levine
Medal record
Representing the United States
City of Jesolo Trophy (Junior)
Gold medal – first place	2015 Jesolo	Team
Gold medal – first place	2015 Jesolo	Vault
Bronze medal – third place	2015 Jesolo	All-Around
International Junior Japan
Silver medal – second place	2015 Tokyo	All-Around
Bronze medal – third place	2015 Tokyo	Vault
Bronze medal – third place	2015 Tokyo	Balance Beam
Representing Florida Gators
NCAA Championships
Bronze medal – third place	2018 St. Louis	Team

Jazmyn Foberg (born February 2, 2000) is an American artistic gymnast. She was the 2014 junior national all-around and uneven bars champion, as well as a member of the United States Junior National Team. Starting in 2017, she has been competing on the Florida Gators women's gymnastics team at the University of Florida.

== Career ==
=== 2014 ===
In August 2014, Foberg competed at the Secret U.S. Classic, where she placed fifth in the all-around, tied for third on vault, tied for sixth on uneven bars, placed seventh on balance beam, and tied for eleventh on floor exercise. Later that month, Foberg competed at the U.S. National Championships, where she won the all-around title ahead of favorites Nia Dennis and Norah Flatley, as well as the uneven bars. She also placed fourth on vault, ninth on beam, and fifth on floor.

On December 8, 2014, Foberg committed to the University of Florida. Foberg enrolled a year early in the fall of 2017.

=== 2015 ===
In March 2015, Foberg made her international debut at the City of Jesolo Trophy. She won gold with the U.S. junior team, gold on vault, and bronze in the all-around.

Foberg participated in the 2015 U.S. Classic in July, winning gold on balance beam with a score of 14.650 and placing second on vault (14.800), third on uneven bars (14.100, tied with Jordan Chiles), and third in the all-around (57.400).

In August, Foberg competed at the National Championships, where she won silver medals in the all-around, vault, uneven bars, and balance beam.

=== 2016 ===
Foberg's senior debut came at the 2016 Secret U.S. Classic. However, she did not compete vault, and received relatively low scores of 13.850 on bars, 13.200 on balance beam, and 12.800 on floor exercise. Foberg withdrew from the U.S. national championships due to a nagging ankle injury, forgoing her chance to compete at the Olympic Trials and make the 2016 Olympic team.

=== Collegiate career ===
Foberg began studies as a student-athlete at the University of Florida in the fall of 2017. During the 2018 competitive gymnastics season, she contributed performances on vault and uneven bars in all but one meet, with occasional performances on balance beam and floor exercise. She performed on vault and uneven bars with the team at the 2018 NCAA Women's Gymnastics Championship Finals Super Six, where University of Florida placed third.

Foberg did not compete with the team during the 2019 gymnastics season due to recovering from elbow surgery.

== Competitive history ==
Year	Event	Team	AA	VT	UB	BB	FX
Junior
2013	U.S. Classic		26	19	11	28	39
2014	Buckeye Elite Qualifier		1st place, gold medalist(s)	2nd place, silver medalist(s)	1st place, gold medalist(s)	3rd place, bronze medalist(s)	6
2014	American Classic		1st place, gold medalist(s)	1st place, gold medalist(s)	1st place, gold medalist(s)	12	15
2014	U.S. Classic		5	3rd place, bronze medalist(s)	6	7	11
2014	P&G National Championships		1st place, gold medalist(s)	4	1st place, gold medalist(s)	9	5
2015	City of Jesolo Trophy	1st place, gold medalist(s)	3rd place, bronze medalist(s)	1st place, gold medalist(s)			
2015	U.S. Classic		3rd place, bronze medalist(s)	2nd place, silver medalist(s)	3rd place, bronze medalist(s)	1st place, gold medalist(s)	8
2015	P&G National Championships		2nd place, silver medalist(s)	2nd place, silver medalist(s)	2nd place, silver medalist(s)	2nd place, silver medalist(s)	4
2015	International Junior Japan		2nd place, silver medalist(s)	3rd place, bronze medalist(s)		3rd place, bronze medalist(s)	7
Senior
2016	U.S. Classic				13	21	12
NCAA
2018	SEC Championship	3rd place, bronze medalist(s)					
2018	NCAA Championship	3rd place, bronze medalist(s)					
2020	SEC Championships	Canceled due to the COVID-19 pandemic in the USA					
2020	NCAA Championships	Canceled due to the COVID-19 pandemic in the USA					
