= Christina Desiderio =

American artistic gymnast

- Full name: Christina Lydia Desiderio
- Born: August 22, 2000 (age 26) Independence Township, New Jersey, U.S.

Gymnastics career
- Discipline: Women's artistic gymnastics
- College team: LSU Tigers (2018–21)
- Training location: Parkettes National Gymnastics Training Center (Allentown, Pennsylvania, U.S.)
- Club: Parkettes
- Retired: May 4, 2021

Christina Lydia Desiderio (born August 22, 2000) is a retired American artistic gymnast. Desiderio was named to the 2015 U.S. Junior National team, after her performances at the 2015 U.S. National Gymnastics Championships.

== Early life ==
Desiderio was born in Independence Township, New Jersey, on August 22, 2000, to Dominick and Carol (née Noll) Desiderio. She has an older brother, Dominick, who is two years older than her, and was a baseball player. She graduated high school a year early. Desiderio started the sport at Giant Gymnastics in Hackettstown, New Jersey, and trained at the club until 2010.

She lives in Hackettstown, New Jersey, and commutes over an hour daily to train at Parkettes National Gymnastics Training Center in Allentown.

== Gymnastics career ==
=== Level 10 and Junior International Elite ===
Desiderio moved up to Level 10 for the 2012 season. Throughout the season, she placed second in the all-around at States, as well as winning three individual titles. At Regionals, she tied for sixth in the all-around and was the beam and vault champion. She advanced to J.O.Nationals and was fifty-fourth in the Junior A division.

In 2013, Desiderio competed at States only; winning the vault and floor titles as well as finishing fourth in the all-around.

In June, she participated in a National Elite Qualifier and achieved Junior International Elite status.

She competed at the American Classic at the Karolyi Ranch and was eighth overall.

At the U.S. Classic, Desiderio finished tenth in the all-around competition. She competed at Nationals; finishing thirteenth in the all-around.

Desiderio competed as an elite throughout the whole 2014 season. She requalified to elite status at the 2014 National Elite Qualifier in San Diego; despite already being qualified.

At the 2014 U.S. Classic, she placed eighth in the all-around. She was eighteenth in the all-around at Nationals, after a tough competition. Desiderio started the 2015 season at the U.S. Classic, where she placed tenth in the all-around and was second on floor.

On October 7, 2015, she announced her verbal commitment to the LSU Lady Tigers gymnastics program – starting from the 2018–19 academic year.

=== Senior International Elite ===
In 2016, Desiderio was named to the National Team and invited to compete for a place on the Olympic Team at the 2016 Summer Olympics trials.

=== Collegiate career ===
Desiderio graduated from high school a year early as a homeschooler and attended Louisiana State University, where she was a member of the LSU Lady Tigers gymnastics team.
