= Veronica Hults =

American artistic gymnast

- Full name: Veronica Hults
- Nicknames: Nica, Shamu
- Born: June 16, 1998 (age 28) Honolulu, Hawaii, United States

Gymnastics career
- Discipline: Women's artistic gymnastics
- Country represented: United States; (2013–2015 (USA))
- Club: Texas Dreams Gymnastics (2010–2016); All Olympia Gymnastics Center (2006–2010)
- Head coaches: Kim Zmeskal-Burdette; Chris Burdette
- Former coaches: Artur Akopyan; Galina Marinova
- Choreographer: Kim Zmeskal-Burdette
- Music: La Cumparsita by bulevard tango club (2010–12), Fireworks by Nicholas Hooper/Miracle by 12 Women Band (2013)
- Retired: December 31, 2016
Medal record
Mexican Open
Gold medal – first place	2013 Acapulco	Team
U.S. Classic
Gold medal – first place	2011 Chicago	Balance Beam
Gold medal – first place	2013 Chicago	Uneven Bars
Bronze medal – third place	2013 Chicago	All Around
Bronze medal – third place	2013 Chicago	Balance Beam
Bronze medal – third place	2012 Chicago	Balance Beam

Veronica "Nica" Hults (born June 16, 1998) is an American former artistic gymnast. She is a former national team member.

== Personal life ==
Veronica was born in Honolulu, Hawaii and was raised by mother Emer and father Scott Hults. She has two younger siblings. She currently lives in Coppell, Texas.

== Junior career ==
=== 2010 ===
In 2010, Hults competed as a Level 9 gymnast and trained at All Olympia Gymnastics Center under Artur Akopyan. She was the Level 9 State Floor Champion and the Western National Floor Champion. Later that year, she relocated to Texas with her family and began training at Texas Dreams Gymnastics.

=== 2011 ===
Hults began her competitive season at the WOGA Classic Elite Qualifier, where she won the balance beam title. Later that year, she traveled to Florida to compete at the Disney Elite Qualifier and managed to qualify to Junior International Elite status, finishing 5th with a total score of 52.100. She competed at the U.S. Classic, placing 13th. This was sufficient to qualify to the USA Gymnastics National Championships, where she competed on the uneven bars and the balance beam.

=== 2012 ===
Hults placed 8th at the Secret U.S. Classic again qualifying to the National Championships, where she placed 9th with a combined 2-day score of 107.600.

=== 2013 ===
At the Secret U.S. Classic, Hults won the gold medals on the uneven bars and the balance beam, as well as the bronze medal in the all-around competition. At the National Championships, her sixth-place finish (cumulative score of 111.900) secured her a berth on the U.S. Junior National Team. Hults made her international debut at the 2013 Mexico Open in Acapulco, where she won the gold medal with teammates Bailie Key, Laurie Hernandez, and Emily Gaskins and placed first on the uneven bars.

== Senior career ==
=== 2014 ===
Hults' senior debut came in 2014.

Veronica competed on uneven bars only at the 2014 Secret U.S. Classic, placing 6th on that event and 15th overall.

Following her competition at the 2014 P&G Championships, Hults didn't make the U.S. National Team but was invited to the 2014 Worlds selection camp. She was not selected for the team.

=== 2015–16: Elite hiatus and transfer to Level 10 ===
Hults didn't compete during the 2015 season, at all; the result of injuries. In January 2016, she competed Level 10 at her gym's local invitational.
