= Pacific Coast High School =

Location
- 14262 Franklin Avenue; Tustin, California 92780; United States
- Coordinates: 33°43′12″N 117°48′16″W

Information
- Other name: PCHS
- Type: Public high school
- School district: Orange County Department of Education
- Principal: Machele Kilgore
- Grades: 9–12
- Colors: Blue and White
- Accreditation: Western Association of Schools and Colleges
- Website: pchs.k12.ca.us

Pacific Coast High School (PCHS) is a public high school in Tustin, California, United States. It is part of the Orange County Department of Education.
