= Nia Dennis =

American artistic gymnast

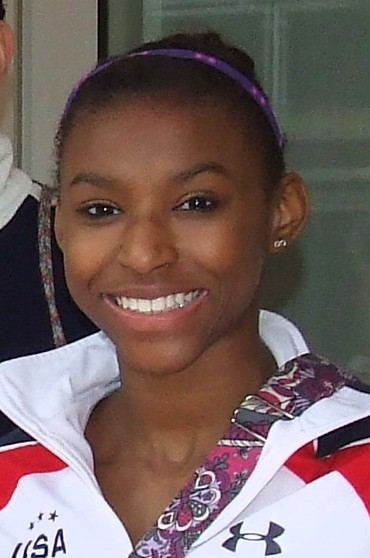
- Dennis at the 2014 City of Jesolo Trophy in Jesolo, Italy.

Personal information
- Born: February 23, 1999 (age 27) Columbus, Ohio, U.S.

Gymnastics career
- Discipline: Women's artistic gymnastics
- Country represented: United States (2012–16 (USA))
- College team: UCLA Bruins
- Club: Buckeye Gymnastics; Legacy Elite Gymnastics
- Head coach: Chris Waller
- Assistant coach: Randy Lane
- Former coaches: Kittia Carpenter; Li Li; Li Yuejiu; Wu Jiani; Valorie Kondos Field; Jordyn Wieber
- Retired: April 3, 2021
Medal record
Representing United States
Pacific Rim Championships
| Gold medal – first place | 2014 Richmond | Team |
| Silver medal – second place | 2014 Richmond | All-Around |
| Silver medal – second place | 2014 Richmond | Vault |
Representing UCLA Bruins
NCAA Championships
| Gold medal – first place | 2018 St. Louis | Team |
| Bronze medal – third place | 2019 Fort Worth | Team |

Nia Camille Dennis (born February 23, 1999) is a retired American collegiate artistic gymnast. She was a member of the USA National Team from 2012 to 2016. She is the 2014 Pacific Rim team champion and junior all-around and vault silver medalist. She was a member of the UCLA Bruins women's gymnastics team.

== Gymnastics career ==
=== Career beginnings ===
==== 2010–12 ====
Dennis competed at the 2010 Covergirl Classic in the 10-11 Hopes Division, where she placed second. In 2011 Dennis qualified to Junior International Elite status. She qualified to the Covergirl Classic in the Junior division. She finished 21st of 36 participants, with a score of 50.450 and therefore did not advance to the National Championships.

Dennis was scheduled to compete at the 2012 Secret U.S. Classic but withdrew due to injury. She advanced to the 2012 National Championships as she had already qualified. She had an excellent two days of competition, accumulating a two-day all-around score of 109.550.

=== Junior elite ===
==== 2013 ====
Dennis returned to the Secret U.S. Classic in 2013. She finished fifth all-around, picking up a gold medal in vault (15.250) and a silver on floor exercise (14.600). Dennis advanced to the 2013 National Championships in Hartford, Connecticut. She finished her two days of competition with 112.550, placing fourth in the all-around. She took home a silver medal on vault also.

==== 2014 ====
Dennis made her international debut in March 2014 at the City of Jesolo Trophy in Jesolo, Italy. She took home a team gold and individual silvers on the uneven bars and the all-around. She went on to compete at the 2014 Pacific Rim Gymnastics Championships in Richmond, British Columbia, where she won the gold medal with the U.S. team and won silver in the all-around and on vault behind teammate Bailie Key. In August Dennis competed at the U.S. Classic where she finished second in the all-around behind Jordan Chiles. She won gold on uneven bars, silver on vault behind Chiles, silver on balance beam behind Norah Flatley, and placed 26th on floor exercise. Dennis finished the season competing at the National Championships. She placed second in the all-around behind Jazmyn Foberg. She placed first on vault and floor exercise, third on uneven bars behind Foberg and Flatley, 22nd on balance beam.

=== Senior elite ===
==== 2015 ====
Dennis turned senior in 2015. On February 17, 2015, Dennis announced that she had committed to UCLA for NCAA gymnastics. At the 2015 U.S. Classic Dennis did not compete on floor exercise. She finished sixth and seventh on uneven bars and balance beam respectively. At the 2015 National Championships Dennis finished ninth in the all-around, 13th on uneven bars, fourth on balance beam, and tenth on floor exercise. Following the National Championships Dennis was named to the U.S. Senior National Team and was invited to the World Championships training camp.

==== 2016 ====
Dennis was selected to represent the United States at the Stuttgart World Cup. However, in February 2016, she tore her Achilles tendon and was replaced by Amelia Hundley. In June Dennis competed at the National Championships where she only competed on uneven bars. She finished eighth on the apparatus.

On November 16 Dennis officially signed her National Letter of Intent with the UCLA Bruins gymnastics team.

=== NCAA ===
==== 2017–18 season ====
In the fall of 2017, Dennis began attending the University of California, Los Angeles, joining the gymnastics program for the 2017–2018 season.

==== Regular season ranking ====
| Season | All-Around | Vault | Uneven Bars | Balance Beam | Floor Exercise |
|---|---|---|---|---|---|
| 2018 | N/A | 28th | 43rd | N/A | 109th |
| 2019 | N/A | 23rd | N/A | 347th | 86th |
| 2020 (Note: The season was cancelled after the 10th week of competition due to the coronavirus pandemic.) | N/A | 32nd | N/A | N/A | 18th |
| 2021 | N/A | 24th | 34th | 330th | 21st |

== Competitive history ==
=== Junior ===
| Year | Event | Team | AA | VT | UB | BB | FX |
|---|---|---|---|---|---|---|---|
| 2012 | National Championships | | 7 | 9 | 13 | 5 | 8 |
| 2013 | U.S. Classic | | 5 | 1st place, gold medalist(s) | 16 | 9 | 2nd place, silver medalist(s) |
| 2013 | National Championships | | 4 | 2nd place, silver medalist(s) | 20 | 6 | 4 |
| 2014 | City of Jesolo Trophy | 1st place, gold medalist(s) | 2nd place, silver medalist(s) | | 2nd place, silver medalist(s) | | |
| 2014 | Pacific Rim Championships | 1st place, gold medalist(s) | 2nd place, silver medalist(s) | 2nd place, silver medalist(s) | | | 6 |
| 2014 | U.S. Classic | | 2nd place, silver medalist(s) | 2nd place, silver medalist(s) | 1st place, gold medalist(s) | 2nd place, silver medalist(s) | 26 |
| 2014 | National Championships | | 2nd place, silver medalist(s) | 1st place, gold medalist(s) | 3rd place, bronze medalist(s) | 22 | 1st place, gold medalist(s) |

=== Senior ===
| Year | Event | Team | AA | VT | UB | BB | FX |
|---|---|---|---|---|---|---|---|
| 2015 | U.S. Classic | | | | 6 | 7 | |
| 2015 | National Championships | | 9 | | 13 | 4 | 10 |
| 2016 | National Championships | | | | 8 | | |

=== NCAA ===
| Year | Event | Team | AA | VT | UB | BB | FX |
|---|---|---|---|---|---|---|---|
| 2018 | PAC-12 Championships | 1st place, gold medalist(s) | | 13 | 7 | | |
| 2018 | NCAA Championships | 1st place, gold medalist(s) | | 58 | 54 | | |
| 2019 | PAC-12 Championships | 1st place, gold medalist(s) | | 8 | 8 | | |
| 2019 | NCAA Championships | 3rd place, bronze medalist(s) | | | 7 | | 20 |
| 2020 | PAC-12 Championships | Canceled due to the COVID-19 pandemic in the USA | | | | | |
| 2020 | NCAA Championships | Canceled due to the COVID-19 pandemic in the USA | | | | | |
| 2021 | PAC-12 Championships | 3rd place, bronze medalist(s) | | 3rd place, bronze medalist(s) | | | |
