= All Olympia Gymnastics Center =

Gymnastics gym in Calabasas, California

Coordinates: 33.913086°N 118.332569°W

The All Olympia Gymnastics Center (AOGC) is a one-facility gymnastics gym in Calabasas. A previous location in Hawthorne, California, was closed down.

The head coaches are 1983 World vault champion Artur Akopyan and 1980 Olympian Galina Marinova. Their notable elite gymnasts are 2012 Olympic Champion McKayla Maroney, 2010 World Team Member Mattie Larson and Stanford Cardinal Samantha Shapiro.

== History ==
AOGC is owned by former Olympic gymnast Galina Marinova and World champion and Olympian Artur Akopyan. The Hawthorne, California, location was used to train actors from the 2006 gymnastics movie Stick It.

In 2010, AOGC junior elite gymnast McKayla Maroney transferred from Gym-Max Gymnastics in Costa Mesa. McKayla competed at the U.S Nationals, placing 3rd in the all-around and winning the vault final. Mattie Larson won the floor final at the U.S Nationals and was named to the U.S 2010 World Gymnastics Championships team.

In 2011, Samantha Shapiro ended her elite career, going into collegiate gymnastics for UCLA and Stanford. Meanwhile, Maroney was named to the U.S Worlds Squad. She took the team gold and also won the World title on the vault.

In 2012, McKayla was named to the U.S Olympic Squad. Injured in the leadup to the Olympics, Maroney competed only on her best event, vault. She competed a near-flawless vault during team finals and later won the silver medal on vault.

In 2013, Maroney took the U.S National titles on floor and vault and was later named to the 2013 World Championships team. She won a gold medal for vault.

=== Sex abuse involvement and location closure ===
AOGC was "at the center" of the USA Gymnastics sex abuse scandal with AOGC, Akopyan, and Marinova involved in multiple lawsuits. Both Maroney and Larson, while members of AOGC, were abused by Larry Nassar when with the United States women's national artistic gymnastics team. AOGC reached a settlement with Larson in June 2018 for $1 million and in November 2018 closed its Hawthorne, California, location.

In 2026, after a SafeSport investigation, Akopyan was permanently banned from involvement with USA Gymnastics, and Marinova was given a one-year suspension.

== Notable gymnasts & alumni ==
- Mohini Bhardwaj
- Kylie Dickson
- Veronica Hults
- Alaina Kwan
- Mattie Larson
- McKayla Maroney
- Samantha Shapiro
