= Rachel Gowey =

American artistic gymnast

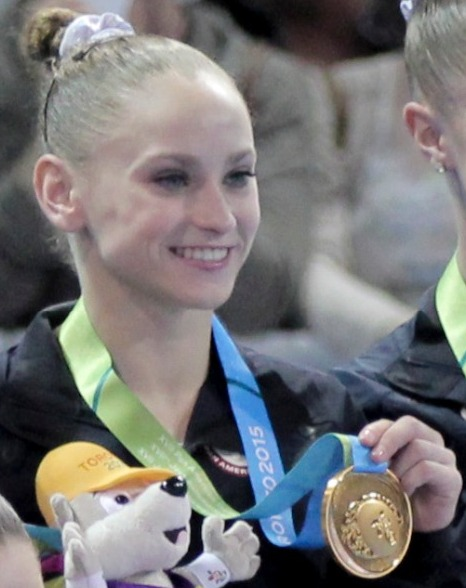
- Gowey at the 2015 Pan American Games

Personal information
- Full name: Rachel Kathryn Gowey
- Born: October 3, 1997 (age 28) Des Moines, Iowa, United States
- Height: 5 ft 0 in (1.52 m)

Gymnastics career
- Discipline: Women's artistic gymnastics
- Country represented: United States (2014–2016 (USA))
- College team: Florida Gators
- Gym: Chow's
- Head coaches: Liang Chow; Jenny Rowland
- Assistant coach: Liwen Zhuang
- Retired: March 12, 2020
Medal record
Representing United States
Pan American Games
Gold medal – first place	2015 Toronto	Team
Gold medal – first place	2015 Toronto	Uneven Bars

Rachel Kathryn Gowey (born October 3, 1997) is a former American artistic gymnast. She was a U.S. National Team member, from 2014 until her retirement from elite gymnastics in 2016, following her performance at the U.S. Olympic Trials.

Gowey was a member of the gold-winning U.S. team at the 2015 Pan-American Games in Toronto. There, she also won a gold medal individually on the uneven bars.

During her elite career, she was coached by Liang Chow, coach of 2008 Olympic balance beam champion Shawn Johnson and 2012 Olympic individual all-around champion Gabby Douglas.

She was coached by Jenny Rowland at the University of Florida, where she began attending in 2016.

== Competitive history ==
=== 2013 ===
Gowey became a Senior International Elite in 2013 and advanced to the USA Gymnastics National Championships, but was unable to compete there due to a back injury.

=== 2014 ===
Gowey was added to the U.S. National Team in 2014. Since her addition to the squad, she was named to the U.S. delegation to the 2014 City of Jesolo Trophy in Venice, Italy. She finished 5th in the all-around with a score of 56.750.

Gowey competed at the 2014 Secret U.S. Classic, placing 4th scoring 57.000. She was scheduled to compete at the 2014 P&G U.S. National Championships but had to withdraw after tearing several ligaments in her ankle on her triple twist dismount on the balance beam at podium training. After recovering and attending national team camps, Gowey was added back to the team on November 25, 2014.

=== 2015 ===
At the Pan American Games in Toronto (July 11–15, 2015), she was part of the US team that won gold convincingly. She also won gold on the uneven bars with a score of 14.725. Following the P&G Championships, where she placed 6th on the uneven bars (15.350 Day 1 + 14.700 Day 2 = 30.050) and 6th on the balance beam (14.400 Day 1 + 14.350 Day 2 = 28.750), Gowey was named to the Senior National Team and was invited to the 2015 Worlds Selection Camp in September.

On November 11, 2015, she officially signed the National Letter of Intent to the University of Florida.

=== 2016 ===
Gowey competed at the Secret U.S. Classic in Hartford, Connecticut, in June. She placed 2nd in the All-Around at this meet and advanced to the P&G Gymnastics Championships.

Later in June, Gowey competed at the P&G Gymnastics Championships in St.Louis, Missouri. After two days of competition, Gowey placed 5th on the uneven bars and 9th in the All-Around with a combined two day score of 113.700. This qualified Gowey to the U.S. Olympic Trials and she was also named to the U.S. National Team following the event.

In July, Gowey competed at the 2016 U.S. Olympic Trials for gymnastics which were held in San Jose, California. After two days of competition, Gowey placed 6th on the uneven bars and 7th on balance beam.

In September, Gowey began attending the University of Florida, where she competed for the Florida Gators gymnastics team from 2016 to 2020.

== Personal life ==
Gowey was born in Des Moines, Iowa. She is a member of the Johnston High School class of 2016 and the University of Florida class of 2020 where she competed on the Florida Gators gymnastics team.
