= Artur Akopyan =

Armenian-American gymnastics coach

- Full name: Artur Akopyan
- Born: September 28, 1961 (age 65) Yerevan, Armenian SSR, Soviet Union
- Height: 5 ft 8 in (173 cm)

Gymnastics career
- Discipline: Men's artistic gymnastics
- Country represented: Soviet Union; (1976–1985)
- Club: Trudoviye Reservi Club
- Head coach: Genrikh Vanisyan
- Retired: 1985
Medal record
Men's artistic gymnastics
Representing the Soviet Union
World Championships
Gold medal – first place	1979 Fort Worth	Team
Gold medal – first place	1981 Moscow	Team
Gold medal – first place	1983 Budapest	Vault
Silver medal – second place	1981 Moscow	High bar
Silver medal – second place	1981 Moscow	Vault
Silver medal – second place	1983 Budapest	Team
Bronze medal – third place	1983 Budapest	All-around

Artur Akopyan (Armenian: Արթուր Հակոբյան born September 28, 1961) is an Armenian gymnastics coach and a former artistic gymnast. He is credited as the first athlete to do a Tsukahara double twist. Akopyan received three scores of 10 at the 1981 World Championships in Moscow. His competitive career included the 1983 World vault title, in addition to three other World individual medals. As a coach, he worked as a member of the US national coaching team and coached national team members. Due to abuse, he has been banned by USA Gymnastics and the U.S. Center for SafeSport.

== Gymnastics career ==
Akopyan was part of the gold medal-winning teams at the 1979 and 1981 World Championships. Additionally, he won a silver medal with the Soviet team at the 1983 World Championships, where he also won an individual gold medal on vault. He retired in 1985.

== Coaching career ==
After his competitive career, Akopyan moved to the United States and began coaching. He gained recognition in the United States after Bela Karolyi asked him to help gymnast Kim Zmeskal. Within a couple of days, Akopyan was able to help Zmeskal with elements of her compulsory routine that she had been working on for a year. He served as a member of the national team coaching staff from 1989 to 2004.

Akopyan owned All Olympia Gymnastics Center, alongside Galina Marinova. At the gym, he coached 2012 Olympic champion McKayla Maroney. In 2016, Akopyan's former athlete Mattie Larson filed a lawsuit against All Olympic Gymnastics and its directors, Akopyan and Galina Marinova, claiming that the "abusive, harassing and degrading environment" at the gym led to a situation of secrecy which enabled Larry Nassar, the former USA Gymnastics national team doctor, to sexually assault her. They settled the lawsuit for $1 million.

In 2024, ten more of his former gymnasts told The Washington Post that Akopyan physically abused them or their teammates when they were girls, including nine who said he had thrown young gymnasts to the ground in anger, sometimes hard enough to leave bruises.

On October 8, 2026, Akopyan was permanently banned from involvement in USA Gymnastics by the U.S. Center for SafeSport.

== Eponymous skill ==
Apparatus	Name	Description	Difficulty (Note: Valid for the 2025–2028 Code of Points)
Vault	Akopian	Tsukahara straight with 2/1 twist	4.4

== Competitive history ==
Year	Event	AA	Team	VT	HB	PH	FX
1976	USSR Cup (junior)	1st					
1977	USSR Championships (junior)	1st					
1977	Friendship Tournament	6th	1st				
1977	All-Union Youth Sports Games			1st			
1978	USSR Championships (junior)	2nd					
1978	Friendship Tournament (junior)	4th	1st		2nd		
1979	USSR Spartakiade	13th					5th
1979	USSR Championships	6th	5th				4th
1979	USSR-ROM Dual Meet	1st	1st				
1979	USSR-GDR Dual Meet	1st	1st				
1979	USSR Cup	1st		2nd	3rd		1st
1979	Chunichi Cup	3rd					
1979	Tokyo Cup			1st	1st		
1980	USSR Cup	6					
1980	Moscow News	3rd					
1981	USSR Cup	11th			2nd		
1981	USSR Championships	5th		1st	2nd		
1981	University Games	3rd		5th	6th		7th
1981	Milan Grand Prix	4th					
1981	World Championships	8th	1st	2nd	2nd		
1983	USSR Spartakiade	3rd		1st			
1983	USSR Cup	2nd		1st	3rd		
1983	USSR Championships	5th		1st		4th	6th
1983	USA-USSR Dual Meet	6th	1st				
1983	Dynamo Spartakiade	3rd					
1983	Riga International	1st		1st			1st
1983	World Championships	3rd	2nd	1st			
1985	USSR Cup	6th					
1985	USSR Championships	6th				8th	
