= Grace Glenn =

American artistic gymnast

Grace Fugui Glenn
- Born: 27 April 1998 (age 28) Nanchang, Jiangxi Province, China
- Height: 157 cm (5 ft 2 in)

Gymnastics career
- Discipline: Women's artistic gymnastics
- College team: UCLA Bruins
- Club: Southeastern Gymnastics Center
- Head coach: Chris Waller
- Assistant coaches: Kristina Comforte; BJ Das; Dom Palange
- Former coaches: Ludmilla Shobe; Valorie Kondos Field; Randy Lane
Medal record
Representing UCLA Bruins
NCAA Championships
Gold medal – first place	2018 St Louis	Team
Bronze medal – third place	2019 Fort Worth	Team

Grace Fugui Glenn (born April 27, 1998 in Nanchang, China) is a retired American artistic gymnast. She was a member of the UCLA Bruins gymnastics team.

== Early and personal life ==
Glenn was born in Nanchang, China and was adopted by Neil and Cindi Glenn, along with her twin sister Anna. She graduated from South Mecklenburg High School in 2016.

== Career ==
=== College ===
In the fall of 2016 she began attending the University of California, Los Angeles, joining the UCLA Bruins gymnastics program for the 2016-2017 season, along with her twin sister Anna.

==== 2016–2017 season ====
She sustained a torn labrum, so Glenn redshirted her freshman year.

==== 2017–2018 season ====
Glenn only competed balance beam during her second season. During the NCAA Championship Super Six, she was the lead-off gymnast, scored 9.9375, and helped the Bruins win the NCAA title with a record breaking 49.7500 balance beam rotation.

==== 2018–2019 season ====
During the 2019 season, Glenn competed balance beam at all meets. At the Pac-12 Championship, she was co-champion on balance beam, sharing the title with fellow Bruin Katelyn Ohashi and helped the team win their 19th conference championship. During the NCAA tournament, she scored 9.9000 on balance beam. UCLA finished third behind first place Oklahoma and second place LSU.

==== 2019–2020 season ====
On January 12, at a meet against Boise State, Glenn began the balance beam rotation with a then career-high 9.975, securing her the meet title. On February 23, at a meet against Utah, Glenn scored the first ever 10.0 for a lead-off gymnast, also winning the meet title. The season was ultimately cut short by the COVID-19 pandemic.

=== Career perfect 10.0 ===
Season	Date	Event	Meet
2020	Feb 23, 2020	Balance beam	UCLA vs Utah

=== Regular season ranking ===
Season	All-Around	Vault	Uneven Bars	Balance Beam	Floor Exercise
2017	N/A	126th	N/A	N/A	N/A
2018	N/A	N/A	N/A	6th	N/A
2019	N/A	N/A	N/A	18th	N/A

== Competitive history ==
=== NCAA ===
Year	Event	Team	AA	VT	UB	BB	FX
2017	PAC-12 Championships	3rd place, bronze medalist(s)					
2017	NCAA Championships	4					
2018	PAC-12 Championships	1st place, gold medalist(s)				9	
2018	NCAA Championships	1st place, gold medalist(s)				37	
2019	PAC-12 Championships	1st place, gold medalist(s)				1st place, gold medalist(s)	
2019	NCAA Championships	3rd place, bronze medalist(s)					
2020	PAC-12 Championships	Canceled due to the COVID-19 pandemic in the USA					
2020	NCAA Championships	Canceled due to the COVID-19 pandemic in the USA					
