= Gracie Kramer =

American artistic gymnast (born 1998)

- Full name: Grace Catherine Kramer
- Born: May 14, 1998 (age 28) Newport Beach, California, U.S.
- Height: 160 cm (5 ft 3 in)

Gymnastics career
- Discipline: Women's artistic gymnastics
- College team: UCLA Bruins (2017–20)
- Club: Wildfire Gymnastics
- Head coach: Chris Waller
- Assistant coaches: Dom Palange; Kristina Comforte; BJ Das
- Former coaches: Valorie Kondos Field; Jordyn Wieber; Randy Lane
- Retired: March 12, 2020
Medal record
Representing UCLA Bruins
NCAA Championships
Gold medal – first place	2018 St. Louis	Team
Bronze medal – third place	2019 Fort Worth	Team

Grace Catherine Kramer (born May 14, 1998), known as Gracie Kramer, is an American artistic gymnast who was a member of the UCLA Bruins gymnastics team from 2016 to 2020. Following her retirement from competition in 2020, she joined the Utah State Aggies gymnastics team as a volunteer assistant coach.

== Early and personal life ==
Kramer was born in Newport Beach, California, to Lorraine and Warren Kramer. She grew up in San Clemente, attending JSerra Catholic High School, and has three siblings. She initially signed to be on the Arizona State Sun Devils gymnastics program, but later switched to be a walk-on for the UCLA Bruins after the head coach Rene Lyst was fired.

== Career ==
In the fall of 2016 she began attending the University of California, Los Angeles, joining the UCLA Bruins gymnastics program for the 2016-2017 season. She was primarily recruited as a vault specialist, but became a key member of the floor squad during the 2018 season, after competing an exhibition routine during the 2017 season.

=== 2017 season ===
During her freshman season, Kramer competed in 10 of 14 meets, ending with an RQS (Regional Qualifying Score) of 9.810. Moreover, Kramer was one of two Bruins who competed a Yurchenko 1.5, debuting the vault on February 11 to score 9.925.

=== 2018 season ===
During her sophomore season, Kramer became a key member of the floor squad, competing on the apparatus in every meet. She achieved a score of 9.85 or higher in 12 out of 13 meets on the floor, and competed on the vault twice with a high of 9.85. On January 7 against Ohio State, Kramer earned her first career win on the floor, tying with Kyla Ross. On February 25, she recorded her season-high of 9.95, at a meet against Oregon State.

=== 2019 season ===
Kramer took 12th place on vault and 4th place on floor in the 2019 PAC-12 Championships to help her team place first. She then placed second on floor in the NCAA Championships, with her team taking third place. Kramer competed in every meet on floor, and 9 out of 14 meets on the vault.

=== 2020 season ===
Kramer won her first event title of the season on January 18, at a meet against BYU and Utah State, with a score of 9.95 on the floor exercise. Her floor routine was featured in a Pop Sugar post on January 22, and again on January 28. On January 31, Kramer scored her first career perfect 10, incidentally also the first perfect 10 of the season, at a meet against Washington. Kramer scored her career high of a 9.95 on vault in a meet against California, on March 8; she also scored 9.9 on floor. Due to the COVID-19 pandemic in the United States, on March 12 the remainder of the season was cancelled, including the 2020 NCAA Championships. Her lowest recorded score on floor during the season was a 9.875 against Stanford, and so she ended the 2020 season ranked third on the floor exercise, with an RQS of 9.95 and an average of 9.937. Kramer was one of only two gymnasts during the season to receive a score of a perfect 10 on the floor exercise, the other being Trinity Thomas.

=== Career perfect 10.0 ===
Season	Date	Event	Meet
2020	Jan 31, 2020	Floor	UCLA vs Washington

=== Regular season ranking ===
Season	All-Around	Vault	Uneven Bars	Balance Beam	Floor Exercise
2017	N/A	126th	N/A	N/A	N/A
2018	N/A	N/A	N/A	N/A	50th
2019	N/A	N/A	N/A	N/A	13th
2020 (Note: The season was cancelled after the 10th week of competition due to the coronavirus pandemic.)	N/A	81st	N/A	N/A	3rd

== Competitive history ==
=== NCAA ===
Year	Event	Team	AA	VT	UB	BB	FX
2017	PAC-12 Championships	3rd place, bronze medalist(s)		47			
2017	NCAA Championships	4					
2018	PAC-12 Championships	1st place, gold medalist(s)					8
2018	NCAA Championships	1st place, gold medalist(s)					21
2019	PAC-12 Championships	1st place, gold medalist(s)		12			4
2019	NCAA Championships	3rd place, bronze medalist(s)		34			5
2020	PAC-12 Championships	Canceled due to the COVID-19 pandemic in the USA					
2020	NCAA Championships	Canceled due to the COVID-19 pandemic in the USA					
