= Felicia Hano =

American gymnast (born 1998)

- Full name: Felicia Yukiye Hano
- Nickname: Fish
- Born: August 7, 1998 (age 28) San Gabriel, California, U.S.
- Height: 5 ft 3 in (160 cm)

Gymnastics career
- Discipline: Double Mini Trampoline and Tumbling (2008-09); Women's Artistic Gymnastics (2002-present)
- Country represented: United States (2014–15)
- College team: UCLA Bruins
- Club: Gym-Max Gymnastics
- Head coach: Chris Waller
- Assistant coach: Randy Lane
- Former coaches: Fernando Villa; Linhong Guo; Linyao Guo; Jenny Zhang; Jordyn Wieber; Valorie Kondos Field; Howie Liang
- Choreographer: Valorie Kondos Field
- Retired: March 12, 2020
Medal record
Women's artistic gymnastics
Representing UCLA Bruins
NCAA Championships
Gold medal – first place	2018 St Louis	Team
Bronze medal – third place	2019 Fort Worth	Team

Felicia Yukiye Hano (born August 7, 1998) is an American former artistic gymnast and trampolinist. She was a U.S. national team member in 2014 and was a member of the UCLA Bruins women's gymnastics team.

== Gymnastics career ==
Hano began gymnastics competing in the trampolining discipline. She won silver medals in the Tumbling and Double mini trampoline competitions at the 2009 World Age Group Championships. She later switched to the artistic gymnastics discipline and won the all-around at the 2012 and 2013 Level 10 national championships. She moved up to the elite level in 2013 and made her elite debut at the 2013 American Classic, winning the vault title and qualifying for the U.S. Championships. She tied for 20th place in the junior all-around at the 2013 U.S. Classic. She had to withdraw from the 2013 U.S. Championships after sustaining a concussion during her uneven bas routine.

Hano became age-eligible for senior elite competition in 2014 and competed at the 2014 American Classic, where she earned qualifying scores on the vault, balance beam, and floor exercise for the 2014 U.S. Championships. She finished seventh on the floor exercise at the 2014 U.S. Classic. She also finished seventh on the floor exercise at the 2014 U.S. Championships. She was not originally selected for the national team. However, when Alyssa Baumann withdrew from the 2014 Pan American Championships due to an elbow injury, Hano was added to the U.S. national team and also became the alternate for the Pan American team.

On July 24, 2015, while at podium training for the 2015 U.S. Classic, Hano was training a full-twisting Tsukahara on vault, and she severely sprained her ankle, causing her to pull out of the competition. She did not return to elite competition and enrolled at the University of California, Los Angeles in 2016.

Hano began competing for the UCLA Bruins in 2017. She missed most of the regular season due to an elbow injury, but she returned for the post-season and earned All-America honors on the vault. She helped UCLA place fourth in the 2017 NCAA Championships. She scored a perfect 10 on the floor exercise in 2018 while competing against Oklahoma. At the 2018 NCAA Championships, she helped UCLA win its first national team title since 2010. At the 2019 Pac-12 Championships, Hano helped UCLA win the team title while tying for the individual vault title. The 2020 season was cut short due to the COVID-19 pandemic, which prompted the NCAA and Pac-12 to cancel all regular-season and championship events. This decision effectively ended Hano's gymnastics career.

=== Regular season ranking ===
Season	All-Around	Vault	Uneven Bars	Balance Beam	Floor Exercise
2017	N/A	N/A	N/A	N/A	N/A
2018	N/A	15th	N/A	N/A	7th
2019	N/A	6th	100th	N/A	16th

== Competitive history ==
=== NCAA ===
Year	Event	Team	AA	VT	UB	BB	FX
2017	Pac-12 Championships	3rd place, bronze medalist(s)		18			
2017	NCAA Championships	4		21			
2018	Pac-12 Championships	1st place, gold medalist(s)		11			
2018	NCAA Championships	1st place, gold medalist(s)					21
2019	Pac-12 Championships	1st place, gold medalist(s)		1st place, gold medalist(s)	18		20
2019	NCAA Championships	3rd place, bronze medalist(s)		12			13
2020	Canceled due to the COVID-19 pandemic in the USA						
