= Pauline Tratz =

German artistic gymnast

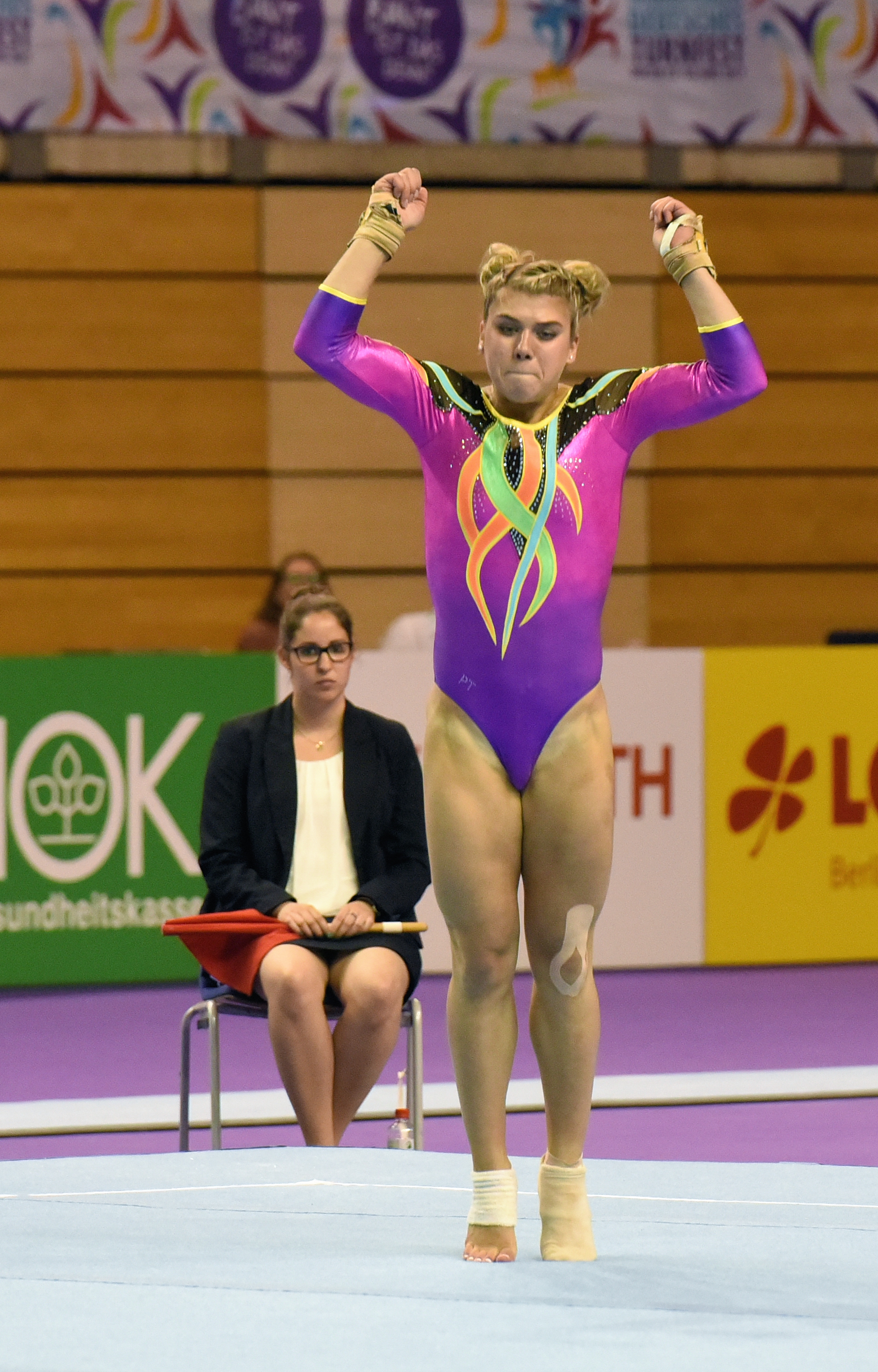
- Tratz in June 2017

Personal information
- Full name: Pauline Charlotte Tratz
- Nickname: Pulla
- Born: 14 June 1999 (age 27) Karlsruhe, Germany
- Height: 170 cm (5 ft 7 in)

Gymnastics career
- Discipline: Women's artistic gymnastics
- Country represented: Germany
- College team: UCLA Bruins (2018–22)
- Club: Kunstturn Region Karlsruhe; TSV Rintheim
- Head coaches: Ursula Koch; Chris Waller
- Former coaches: Valorie Kondos Field; Jordyn Wieber; Randy Lane; Kyla Ross
- Retired: 2 April 2022
Medal record
Representing UCLA Bruins
NCAA Championships
Gold medal – first place	2018 St. Louis	Team
Bronze medal – third place	2019 Fort Worth	Team

Pauline Charlotte Tratz (born 14 June 1999) is a former German artistic gymnast. Tratz competed at the 2015 World Artistic Gymnastics Championships where she helped her team place 12th. She was an alternate for the German team at the 2016 Summer Olympics, and competed at the 2017 Summer Universiade. She began competing for the UCLA Bruins gymnastics team in the 2018 season.

== Personal life ==
Tratz was born on 14 June 1999 in Karlsruhe to Annette and Matthias Tratz. She has an older brother, Julius. In 2017, Tratz began attending the University of California, Los Angeles where she is currently pursuing a major in communication studies. In 2021, she was named the Pac-12 Women's Gymnastics Scholar-Athlete of the Year.

== Career ==
=== Elite ===
==== 2015 ====
Tratz started her senior career in 2015. In March, she competed at the Cottbus World Challenge Cup, where she qualified for the vault final and finished fifth. In April, she competed at the 2015 European Artistic Gymnastics Championships, where she qualified for the all-around final and finished 18th. In September, she competed at the German National Championships, winning a silver medal on vault and a bronze medal on floor exercise. In October, she competed at the 2015 World Artistic Gymnastics Championships and helped Germany finish 12th in the team competition.

==== 2016 ====
In March, she competed at the German National Team Cup, where she placed fifth all-around with a score of 51.250 and also won a silver medal on vault. A few weeks later she competed in the DTB-Pokal Team Challenge held in Stuttgart, where she helped her team win a silver medal. After the competition ended she was selected, along with Sophie Scheder, Elisabeth Seitz, Pauline Schäfer, Tabea Alt and Leah Griesser to represent her country at the 2016 Olympic Test Event.

At the Olympic Test Event held in Rio de Janeiro she helped the German team qualify in second place, thus earning one of the final four spots to send a full team to the Games.

In June, Tratz competed at the German national championships, winning the gold medal on vault and also taking the bronze on the floor exercise. At the German Olympic Trials, Tratz placed ninth in the all around and third on the floor exercise. She was selected as an alternate for the German Olympic team.

On 10 November 2016, auline signed a letter of intent to attend UCLA and compete for the Bruin gymnastics team starting with the 2018 season.

==== 2017 ====
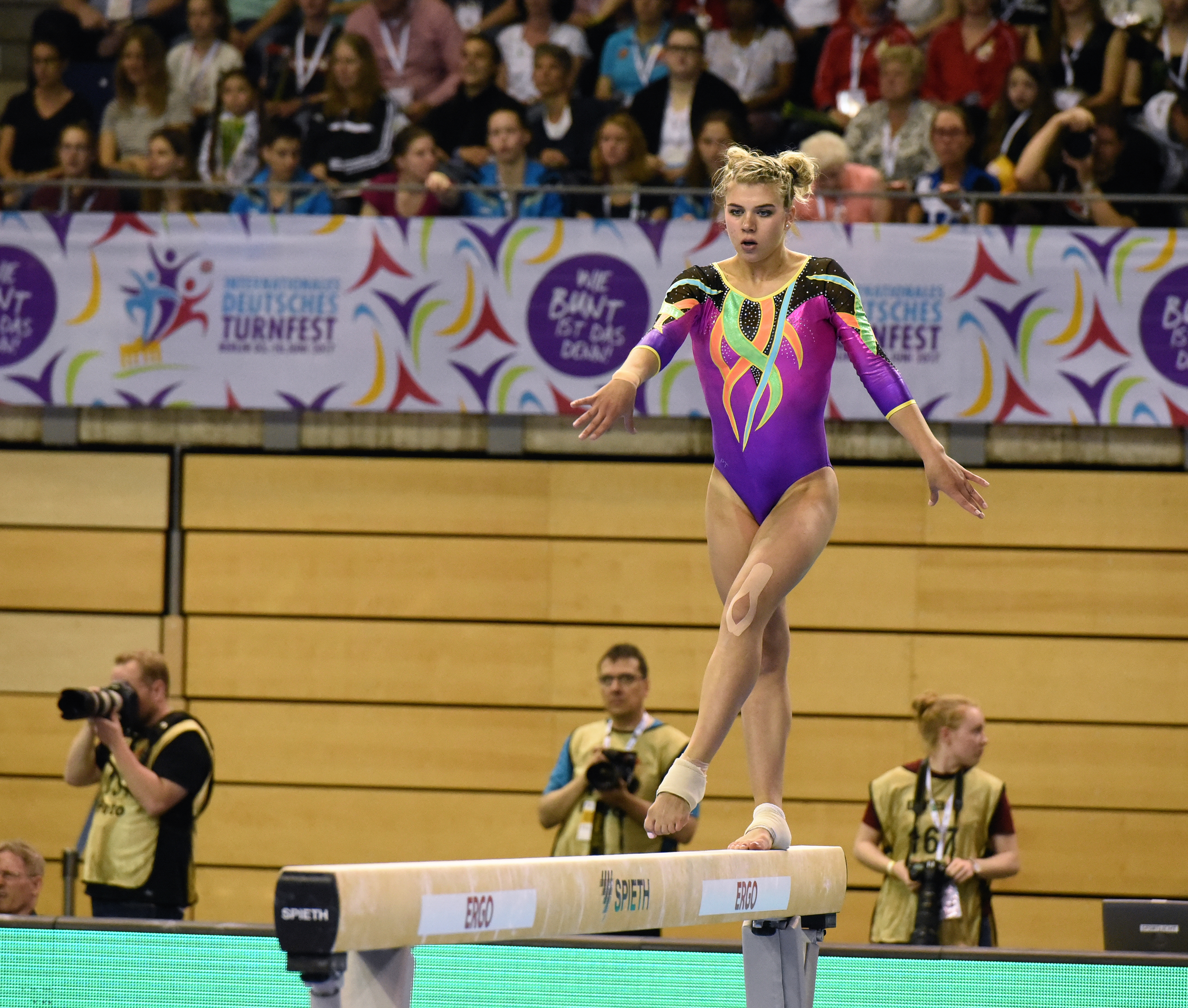
Tratz competing on the balance beam in June 2017

In June, Tratz won the gold on vault at the German national championships. In August, before heading to UCLA, she competed at the 2017 Summer Universiade in Taipei. She contributed to the German team's fourth-place finish, and also qualified to the floor exercise and all-around finals, placing fifth and thirteenth respectively.

=== College ===
In the fall of 2017, Tratz began attending the University of California, Los Angeles, joining the gymnastics program for the 2017–2018 season.

As a freshman, Tratz helped the Bruins win the 2018 NCAA Championship, their seventh NCAA team title.

In May 2021, Tratz announced that she will return to UCLA for her fifth season.

==== Regular season ranking ====
Season	All-Around	Vault	Uneven Bars	Balance Beam	Floor Exercise
2018	N/A	38th	N/A	N/A	22nd
2019	N/A	63rd	N/A	N/A	40th
2021	N/A	70th	N/A	N/A	21st

== Competitive history ==
Year	Event	Team	AA	VT	UB	BB	FX
Junior
2013	Junior Japan International		13		8		
2014
2014	European Championships	4					
Senior
2015	Cottbus World Cup			5			
2015	European Championships		18				
2015	German Championships		7	2nd place, silver medalist(s)			3rd place, bronze medalist(s)
2015	German World Championships Trials		5	3rd place, bronze medalist(s)			3rd place, bronze medalist(s)
2015	World Championships	12					
2016	German National Team Cup		5	2nd place, silver medalist(s)			
2016	DTB Team Challenge	2nd place, silver medalist(s)	20	3rd place, bronze medalist(s)			
2016	Olympic Test Event	2nd place, silver medalist(s)					
2016	German Championships		10	1st place, gold medalist(s)			3rd place, bronze medalist(s)
2016	German Olympic Trials		9				3rd place, bronze medalist(s)
2016	Cottbus World Cup			4			
2017	German Championships			1st place, gold medalist(s)			
2017	Summer Universiade	4	13				5
NCAA
2018	PAC-12 Championships	1st place, gold medalist(s)		13			3rd place, bronze medalist(s)
2018	NCAA Championships	1st place, gold medalist(s)		24			27
2019	PAC-12 Championships	1st place, gold medalist(s)		12			4
2019	NCAA Championships	3rd place, bronze medalist(s)		17			
2020	PAC-12 Championships	Canceled due to the COVID-19 pandemic in the USA					
2020	NCAA Championships	Canceled due to the COVID-19 pandemic in the USA					
2021	PAC-12 Championships	3rd place, bronze medalist(s)		3rd place, bronze medalist(s)			1st place, gold medalist(s)
