= 2018 NCAA women's gymnastics tournament =

American college gymnastics competition

2018 NCAA Women's Gymnastics Championships
- Venue: Chaifetz Arena
- Location: St. Louis, Missouri
- Dates: April 20–21
- Teams: 12

Medalists
gold medal	UCLA
silver medal	Oklahoma
bronze medal	Florida

The 2018 NCAA Women's Gymnastics Championships were held April 20–21, 2018, at the Chaifetz Arena in St. Louis, Missouri. The UCLA Bruins were the team champions with a total of 198.075 points, defeating Alabama, Arkansas, California, Florida, Georgia, Kentucky, LSU, Nebraska, Oklahoma, Utah, and Washington.

== NCAA Championship (Super Six) ==
=== Standings ===
Rank	Team	Vault (gymnastics)	Uneven bars	Balance beam	Floor (gymnastics)	Total
1st place, gold medalist(s)	UCLA	49.2250	49.6375	49.7500	49.4625	198.0750
1st place, gold medalist(s)	Kyla Ross	9.8000	9.9500	9.9875	9.3125	39.0500
1st place, gold medalist(s)	Madison Kocian		9.9375	9.2750	9.8375	29.0500
1st place, gold medalist(s)	Christine Peng-Peng Lee		10.0000	10.0000		20.0000
1st place, gold medalist(s)	Katelyn Ohashi			9.9500	9.9500	19.9000
1st place, gold medalist(s)	Anna Glenn	9.8875	9.8500			19.7250
1st place, gold medalist(s)	Pauline Tratz	9.8250			9.8875	19.7125
1st place, gold medalist(s)	Felicia Hano	9.8000			9.9000	19.7000
1st place, gold medalist(s)	Nia Dennis	9.8375	9.8375			19.6750
1st place, gold medalist(s)	Grace Glenn			9.9375		9.9375
1st place, gold medalist(s)	JaNay Honest		9.9000			9.9000
1st place, gold medalist(s)	Gracie Kramer				9.8875	9.8875
1st place, gold medalist(s)	Napualani Hall	9.8750				9.8750
1st place, gold medalist(s)	Brielle Nguyen			9.8750		9.8750
2nd place, silver medalist(s)	Oklahoma	49.4875	49.5375	49.4250	49.5875	198.0375
2nd place, silver medalist(s)	Maggie Nichols	9.9375	9.9625	9.9125	9.9625	39.7750
2nd place, silver medalist(s)	Brehanna Showers	9.8375	9.9000	9.8750	9.8750	39.4875
2nd place, silver medalist(s)	Brenna Dowell	9.9375	9.9125		9.9375	29.7875
2nd place, silver medalist(s)	Anastasia Webb		9.8500	9.9125	9.9250	29.6875
2nd place, silver medalist(s)	Nicole Lehrmann	9.8500	9.8750	9.2000		28.9250
2nd place, silver medalist(s)	Stefani Catour		9.8875	9.8750		19.7625
2nd place, silver medalist(s)	AJ Jackson	9.8625			9.7250	19.5875
2nd place, silver medalist(s)	Jade Degouveia	9.9000				9.9000
2nd place, silver medalist(s)	Evy Schoepfer				9.8875	9.8875
2nd place, silver medalist(s)	Natalie Brown			9.8500		9.8500
3rd place, bronze medalist(s)	Florida	49.4125	49.5375	49.3375	49.5625	197.8500
3rd place, bronze medalist(s)	Alicia Boren	9.9375	9.8500	9.8125	9.9375	39.5375
3rd place, bronze medalist(s)	Amelia Hundley	9.8000	9.9000	9.8500	9.9250	39.4750
3rd place, bronze medalist(s)	Alex McMurtry	9.8750	9.9750	9.2750	9.9125	39.0375
3rd place, bronze medalist(s)	Rachel Gowey		9.8750	9.9125	9.8250	29.6125
3rd place, bronze medalist(s)	Megan Skaggs	9.7750	9.9000	9.8250		29.5000
3rd place, bronze medalist(s)	Alyssa Baumann			9.9375	9.9500	19.8875
3rd place, bronze medalist(s)	Jazmyn Foberg	9.8875	9.8875			19.7750
3rd place, bronze medalist(s)	Rachel Slocum	9.9125			9.8375	19.7500
4	LSU	49.4625	49.4750	49.3875	49.5125	197.8375
4	Myia Hambrick	9.9500	9.8750	9.8875	9.9500	39.6625
4	Sarah Finnegan	9.8125	9.8125	9.9375	9.9500	39.5125
4	Kennedi Edney	9.8625	9.9500	9.8375	9.8625	39.5125
4	Lexie Priessman		9.9500		9.8125	19.7625
4	Christina Desiderio			9.8500	9.9000	19.7500
4	Ruby Harrold	9.8250	9.8875			19.7125
4	Sarah Edwards	9.9500				9.9500
4	Julianna Cannamela	9.8750				9.8750
4	Reagan Campbell			9.8750		9.8750
4	Ashlyn Kirby				9.8500	9.8500
4	Sami Durante		9.7750			9.7750
4	Erin Macadaeg				9.7375	9.7375
5	Utah	49.0750	49.2875	49.3500	49.1875	196.9000
5	MyKayla Skinner	9.8625	9.9125	9.9250	9.9250	39.6250
5	Missy Reinstadtler	9.8000	9.8500	9.8750	9.8500	39.3750
5	Kari Lee	9.8375	9.8000	9.8250	9.8125	39.2750
5	MaKenna Merrell-Giles	9.7875	9.8625	9.8875	9.6875	39.2250
5	Tiffani Lewis	9.7875	9.7750		9.7375	29.3000
5	Sydney Soloski			9.7375	9.8625	19.6000
5	Kim Tessen	9.7125	9.8265			19.5750
5	Maddy Stover			9.8375		9.8375
6	Nebraska	49.3000	48.8250	49.2750	49.4000	196.8000
6	Megan Schweihofer	9.9125	9.8625	9.8250	9.9250	39.5250
6	Kynsee Roby	9.5875	9.8125	9.8500	9.8625	39.1125
6	Abbie Epperson	9.8250	9.7750	9.0875	9.8375	38.5250
6	Grace Williams	9.7125		9.8875	9.8750	29.4750
6	Sienna Crouse	9.9625	9.5875		9.9000	29.4500
6	Taylor Houchin	9.8875	9.5000	9.8750		29.2625
6	Danielle Breen		9.7875	9.8375		19.6250
6	Catelyn Orel				9.8375	9.8375

== Individual results ==
=== All-around ===
Rank	Gymnast	Vault (gymnastics)	Uneven bars	Balance beam	Floor (gymnastics)	Total
1st place, gold medalist(s)	Maggie Nichols (Oklahoma)	9.9000	10.0000	9.9500	9.9625	39.8125
2nd place, silver medalist(s)	MyKayla Skinner (Utah)	9.9375	9.9250	9.9250	9.9375	39.7250
3rd place, bronze medalist(s)	Elizabeth Price (Stanford)	9.8875	10.0000	9.8625	9.9250	39.6750
4	Kyla Ross (UCLA)	9.8500	9.9500	9.9500	9.8875	39.6375
5	Alex McMurtry (Florida)	9.9375	9.9500	9.8750	9.8250	39.5875
6	Myia Hambrick (LSU)	9.8750	9.8500	9.8625	9.9500	39.5375
7	Kennedi Edney (LSU)	9.8875	9.9375	9.8000	9.9000	39.5250
8	Sarah Finnegan (LSU)	9.8500	9.8875	9.9000	9.8625	39.5000
8	Mollie Korth (Kentucky)	9.9250	9.8750	9.8375	9.8625	39.5000

== Event results ==
=== Vault ===
Rank	Gymnast	Score
1st place, gold medalist(s)	Brenna Dowell (Oklahoma)	9.9375
1st place, gold medalist(s)	Alex McMurtry (Florida)	9.9375
1st place, gold medalist(s)	MyKayla Skinner (Utah)	9.9375
4	Alicia Boren (Florida)	9.9250
4	Mollie Korth (Kentucky)	9.9250
6	Taylor Houchin (Nebraska)	9.9000
6	Maggie Nichols (Oklahoma)	9.9000
6	Rachel Slocum (Florida)	9.9000
6	Sydney Snead (Georgia)	9.9000

=== Uneven Bars ===
Rank	Gymnast	Score
1st place, gold medalist(s)	Maggie Nichols (Oklahoma)	10.0000
1st place, gold medalist(s)	Elizabeth Price (Stanford)	10.0000
3rd place, bronze medalist(s)	Nicole Lehrmann (Oklahoma)	9.9500
3rd place, bronze medalist(s)	Alex McMurtry (Florida)	9.9500
3rd place, bronze medalist(s)	Kyla Ross (UCLA)	9.9500
6	Kennedi Edney (LSU)	9.9375
7	Stefani Catour (Oklahoma)	9.9250
7	MyKayla Skinner (Utah)	9.9250

=== Balance Beam ===
Rank	Gymnast	Score
1st place, gold medalist(s)	Christine Peng-Peng Lee (UCLA)	9.9875
2nd place, silver medalist(s)	Maggie Nichols (Oklahoma)	9.9500
2nd place, silver medalist(s)	Kyla Ross (UCLA)	9.9500
4	Katelyn Ohashi (UCLA)	9.9250
4	MyKayla Skinner (Utah)	9.9250
6	Rachel Gowey (Florida)	9.9125
7	Nicole Lehrmann (Oklahoma)	9.9000
7	Sarah Finnegan (LSU)	9.9000
7	Shani Remme (Boise State)	9.9000

=== Floor Exercise ===
Rank	Gymnast	Score
1st place, gold medalist(s)	Maggie Nichols (Oklahoma)	9.9625
1st place, gold medalist(s)	Katelyn Ohashi (UCLA)	9.9625
3rd place, bronze medalist(s)	Alyssa Baumann (Florida)	9.9500
3rd place, bronze medalist(s)	Myia Hambrick (LSU)	9.9500
5	MyKayla Skinner (Utah)	9.9375
5	Anastasia Webb (Oklahoma)	9.9375
7	AJ Jackson (Oklahoma)	9.9250
7	Elizabeth Price (Stanford)	9.9250
