= Randy Lane =

Gymnastics athlete/coach

Current position
- Title: Head coach
- Team: Long Island Sharks
- Conference: East Atlantic Gymnastics League (EAGL)

Biographical details
- Born: 1967 (age 58–59)
- Education: University of Illinois at Urbana-Champaign

Coaching career (HC unless noted)
- 1992–1994: UCLA (Asst. coach)
- 1995–1997: UC Santa Barbara
- 1998–2001: UCLA (Asst. coach)
- 2002–2006: Florida (Asst. coach)
- 2007–2011: Michigan State (Associate head coach)
- 2012–2016: UCLA (Asst. coach)
- 2017–19: UCLA (Asst. head coach)
- 2021–present: Long Island Sharks (Head coach)

Accomplishments and honors

Championships
- Conference title (13): Pac-12, (UCLA): 1993; 1999; 2000; 2002; 2012; 2016; 2018; 2019; Big Ten, (Michigan State): 2007; 2008; 2009; 2010; 2011 National title (3): UCLA: 2000; 2001; 2018

Awards
- National Assistant Coach of the Year: 2000; West Region Assistant Coach of the Year: 2012; 2018

Randy Lane
- Born: 1967 (age 58–59)

Gymnastics career
- Discipline: Men's artistic gymnastics
- College team: Illinois Fighting Illini (Class of 1989)
- Club: Columbus Gymnastics Center
- Head coach: Yoshi Hayasaki
Medal record
Representing Illinois Fighting Illini
NCAA Championships
Gold medal – first place	1989 Lincoln	Team
Silver medal – second place	1988 Lincoln	Team
Big Ten Championships
Gold medal – first place	1988	Team
Gold medal – first place	1989	Team

Randy Lane (born in 1967) is a former American artistic gymnast, and a current collegiate gymnastics coach. He competed for the Illinois Fighting Illini team from 1986–1989, helping his team to win the 1989 NCAA Championship. Lane was the current head coach of the Long Island University gymnastics team, serving as the program's inaugural head coach after the school added the program in March 2020.

Lane also serves as the Chair of the Collegiate Gymnastics Growth Initiative (CGGI).

== Career ==
=== As a gymnast ===
Lane competed for the Illinois Fighting Illini team from 1986–1989, with which he won two Big Ten Conference Championship and one NCAA National Championship, in 1989.

Championship Finishes
Year	Championship	Finish
1988	Big Ten	1st
1988	NCAA	2nd
1989	Big Ten	1st
1989	NCAA	1st

== Championships ==
=== NCAA national championships ===
NCAA Championship Finishes
College team	Year	Finish
UCLA Bruins	1992	9th
UCLA Bruins	1993	4th
UCLA Bruins	1994	5th
UCLA Bruins	1998	5th
UCLA Bruins	1992	5th
UCLA Bruins	2000	1st
UCLA Bruins	2001	1st
Florida Gators	2002	10th
Florida Gators	2003	7th
Florida Gators	2004	4th
Florida Gators	2005	7th
Florida Gators	2006	4th
UCLA Bruins	2012	3rd
UCLA Bruins	2013	4th
UCLA Bruins	2014	6th
UCLA Bruins	2015	11th
UCLA Bruins	2016	5th
UCLA Bruins	2017	4th
UCLA Bruins	2018	1st
UCLA Bruins	2019	3rd

=== Conference championships ===
Conference Championship Finishes
College team	Year	Conference	Finish
UCLA Bruins	1993	Pac-12	1st
UCLA Bruins	1994	Pac-12	2nd
UCLA Bruins	1999	Pac-12	1st
UCLA Bruins	2000	Pac-12	1st
UCLA Bruins	2001	Pac-12	2nd
Florida Gators	2002	SEC	3rd
Florida Gators	2003	SEC	3rd
Florida Gators	2004	SEC	4th
Florida Gators	2005	SEC	4th
Florida Gators	2006	SEC	3rd
Michigan State Spartans	2007	Big Ten	1st
Michigan State Spartans
UCLA Bruins	2012	Pac-12	1st
UCLA Bruins	2013	Pac-12	2nd
UCLA Bruins	2015	Pac-12	2nd
UCLA Bruins	2016	Pac-12	1st
UCLA Bruins	2018	Pac-12	1st
UCLA Bruins	2019	Pac-12	1st

== Competitive history ==
=== NCAA ===
Year	Event	Team	AA	VT	UB	BB	FX
1988	Big Ten Championships	1st place, gold medalist(s)					
1988	NCAA Championships	2nd place, silver medalist(s)					
1989	Big Ten Championships	1st place, gold medalist(s)					
1989	NCAA Championships	1st place, gold medalist(s)					
