= List of Pac-12 Conference champions =

CC This is a list of conference champions in sports sponsored by the Pac–12 Conference.

== Current members ==
Institution	Location	Founded	Type	Enrollment	Endowment	Nickname	NCAA Team Championships (through May 23, 2024)
Oregon State University	Corvallis, Oregon	1868	Public	35,239	$329,200,000	Beavers	4
Washington State University	Pullman, Washington	1890	Public	24,139	$619,700,000	Cougars	2

== Future members ==
Institution	Location	Founded	Type	Enrollment	Endowment	Nickname	NCAA Team Championships (through May 23, 2024)	Joining	Current conference
Boise State University	Boise, Idaho	1932	Public	28,519	$185,800,000	Broncos	1	2026	Mountain West Conference
Colorado State University	Fort Collins, Colorado	1870	Public	34,412	$623,600,000	Rams	0	2026	Mountain West Conference
California State University, Fresno (Fresno State)	Fresno, California	1911	Public	24,310	$254,800,000	Bulldogs	4	2026	Mountain West Conference
Gonzaga University	Spokane, Washington	1887	Private (Catholic)	7,470	$451,900,000	Bulldogs	0	2026	West Coast Conference
San Diego State University	San Diego, California	1897	Public	38,369	$456,600,000	Aztecs	9	2026	Mountain West Conference
Texas State University	San Marcos, Texas	1899	Public	34,412	$393,000,000 (Note: Main campus only; does not include system-wide endowment.)	Bobcats	0	2026	Sun Belt Conference
Utah State University	Logan, Utah	1888	Public	29,831	$615,000,000	Aggies	0	2026	Mountain West Conference

== Summary ==
Through May 25, 2025

School	Joined Pac–12	Total	Baseball	Men's Basketball	Women's Basketball	Women's Beach Volleyball	Men's Cross Country	Women's Cross Country	Football	Men's Golf	Women's Golf	Women's Gymnastics	Women's Lacrosse	Men's Rowing	Women's Rowing	Men's Soccer	Women's Soccer	Softball	Men's Swimming & Diving	Women's Swimming & Diving	Men's Tennis	Women's Tennis	Men's Outdoor Track	Women's Outdoor Track	Women's Volleyball	Wrestling	Total	School
Oregon State	1915	73	21	12	3	—	—	0	5	0	0	6	—	0	0	1	0	1	—	—	—	—	—	0	0	24	73	Oregon State
Washington State	1917	51	34	2	0	—	4	0	4	0	0	—	—	—	0	—	0	—	—	0	—	2	4	0	0	1	51	Washington State

== Affiliate members ==
Institution	Location	Founded	Joined	Type	Enrollment	Nickname	Current conference	Pac–12 sports
University of Arkansas at Little Rock	Little Rock, Arkansas	1927	2019	Public	8,197	Trojans	Sun Belt	Men's wrestling
California Polytechnic State University	San Luis Obispo, California	1901	1986	Public	21,812	Mustangs	Big West	Men's wrestling
California State University, Bakersfield	Bakersfield, California	1965	1987	Public	11,206	Roadrunners	WAC	Men's wrestling

== Future affiliate members ==
Institution	Location	Founded	Joining	Type	Enrollment (fall 2023)	Nickname	Pac-12 sport(s)	Primary conference	Current conference in Pac-12 sport
Dallas Baptist University	Dallas, Texas	1898	2026	Private	4,201	Patriots	Baseball	Lone Star (Note: Current NCAA Division II athletic conference.)	CUSA
Northern Illinois University	DeKalb, Illinois	1895	2026	Public	15,504	Huskies	Men's wrestling	MAC (Horizon in 2026)	MAC
Southern Utah University	Cedar City, Utah	1897	2026	Public	15,033	Thunderbirds (Note: Southern Utah uses the nicknames "Flippin' Birds" and "Thunderbirds" interchangeably for its women's gymnastics program.)	Women's gymnastics	WAC (Big Sky in 2026)	MPSF

== Former members ==
No school left the Pac–12 from its founding as the AAWU in 1959 until the conference's collapse in 2024. Two members of the PCC never joined the AAWU.

Institution	Location	Founded	Type	Enrollment	Nickname	Conference Membership	Current Conference
University of Arizona	Tucson, Arizona	1885	Public	51,137	Wildcats	1978–2024	Big 12
Arizona State University	Tempe, Arizona	1885	Public	79,232	Sun Devils	1978–2024	Big 12
University of California, Berkeley	Berkeley, California	1868	Public	45,307	Golden Bears	1915–2024	ACC
University of Colorado at Boulder	Boulder, Colorado	1876	Public	36,430	Buffaloes	2011–2024	Big 12
University of Idaho	Moscow, Idaho	1889	Public	11,507	Vandals	1922–1959	Big Sky
University of Montana	Missoula, Montana	1893	Public	11,000	Grizzlies	1924–1950	Big Sky
University of Oregon	Eugene, Oregon	1876	Public	23,202	Ducks	1915–1959; 1964–2024	Big Ten
Stanford University	Stanford, California	1891	Private	16,937	Cardinal	1918–2024	ACC
University of California, Los Angeles	Los Angeles, California	1919	Public	45,900	Bruins	1928–2024	Big Ten
University of Southern California	Los Angeles, California	1880	Private	49,500	Trojans	1922–2024	Big Ten
University of Utah	Salt Lake City, Utah	1850	Public	34,900	Utes	2011–2024	Big 12
University of Washington	Seattle, Washington	1861	Public	49,165	Huskies	1915–2024	Big Ten

== Baseball ==
Season	Conference	
1916	California	
1917	California	
1918	Oregon	
1919	Washington	
1920	California	
1921	California	
1922	Washington	
Season	North	South
1923	Washington	California
Season	Conference	
1924	California	
Season	North	South
1925	Oregon State	Stanford
1926	Washington	California
Season	North	CIBA
1927	Washington State, Oregon State	St. Mary's
1928	Oregon, Washington State	St. Mary's
1929	Washington	California
1930	Washington	USC
1931	Washington	Stanford
1932	Washington	USC
1933	Washington State	California
1934	Oregon	California
1935	Oregon	California, USC
1936	Washington State	USC
1937	Oregon	California
1938	Oregon State, Washington State	California
1939	Oregon	St. Mary's, USC
1940	Oregon State	St. Mary's
1941	Oregon	California, St. Mary's
1942	Oregon	USC
1943	Oregon, Oregon State	California†, USC†
1944	Washington State	UCLA
1945	Washington State	California
1946	Oregon	USC
1947	Washington State	**California**, USC
1948	Washington State	**USC***
1949	Washington State	USC*
1950	Washington State*	Stanford
1951	Oregon State	USC*
1952	Oregon State*	USC
1953	Oregon	Stanford*
1954	Oregon*	USC
1955	Oregon	USC*
1956	Washington State*	USC
1957	Oregon	**California***, USC
1958	Oregon State	**USC***
1959	Washington	USC*
Season	AAWU	
1960	Washington State	California, USC
1961	Washington State	**USC**
1962	Oregon State	Santa Clara
1963	Oregon State	**USC**
1964	Oregon	USC
1965	Washington State	Stanford
1966	Washington State	USC
Season	Pac–8	
1967	Stanford	
1968	**USC**	
1969	UCLA	
Season	North	CIBA
1970	Washington State	**USC****
1971	Washington State	**USC****
1972	Washington State, Oregon	**USC****
1973	Washington State	**USC****
1974	Oregon, Washington State	**USC****
1975	Oregon State	USC**
1976	Washington State**	UCLA
Season	North	South
1977	Washington State	USC**
1978	Washington State	**USC****
1979	Washington State	UCLA
1980	Washington State	**Arizona**, California
1981	Washington	**Arizona State**
1982	Oregon State	Arizona State
1983	Oregon State	Stanford
1984	Portland State, Washington State	Arizona State
1985	Oregon State, Washington State	Stanford
1986	Oregon State	UCLA
1987	Washington State	**Stanford**
1988	Washington State	Arizona State
1989	Washington State	Arizona
1990	Washington State	Stanford
1991	Washington State	USC
1992	Washington	Arizona
1993	Washington	Arizona State
1994	Oregon State	Stanford
1995	Washington State	USC
1996	Washington	USC
1997	Washington	Stanford
1998	Washington	Stanford
Season	Pac–10	Record
1999	Stanford	50–15 (19–5)
2000	Arizona State‡, Stanford, UCLA	(17–7)
2001	USC	45–19 (18–6)
2002	USC	37–24 (17–7)
2003	Stanford	51–18 (18–6)
2004	Stanford	46–14 (16–8)
2005	Oregon State	46–12 (19–5)
2006	**Oregon State**	50–16 (16–7)
2007	Arizona State	49–15 (19–5)
2008	Arizona State	49–13 (16–8)
2009	Arizona State	51–14 (21–6)
2010	Arizona State	52–10 (20–7)
2011	UCLA	35–24 (18–9)
Season	Pac–12	Record
2012	UCLA‡, **Arizona**	42–14 (20–10), 38–17 (20–10)
2013	Oregon State	52–13 (24–6)
2014	Oregon State	45–14 (23–7)
2015	UCLA	45–16 (22–8)
2016	Utah	25–27 (19–11)
2017	Oregon State	56–6 (27–3)
2018	Stanford	46–12 (22–8)
2019	UCLA	52–11 (24–5)
2021	Arizona	45–18 (21–9)
Season	Regular Season	Tournament
2022	Stanford 37–14 (21–9)	Stanford (1)
2023	Stanford 37–14 (23–7)	Oregon (1)
2024	Arizona 36–21 (20–10)	Arizona (1)

Bold text indicates National Champion
* Pacific Coast Conference playoff champion
** North–South playoff champion
† California won the CIBA Division 1 and USC won Division 2. Cal defeated USC in a playoff for the CIBA title.
‡ Won the tiebreaker and the automatic post–season bid
Arizona State won the 1969 and 1977 National Championships as a member of the Western Athletic Conference. The Sun Devils' first baseball season in the Pac–12 was 1979.
Arizona won the 1976 National Championship as a member of the WAC. The Wildcats also joined the Pac–10 for the 1979 baseball season.
Arizona won the 1986 National Championship but did not win the South Division
Stanford won the 1988 National Championship but did not win the South Division. The Cardinal defeated South Division champion Arizona State in the final
USC won the 1998 National Championship, defeating Arizona State in the final. Neither won the South Division
Oregon State won the 2007 and 2018 National Championships but did not win the conference championships for those years.
UCLA won the 2013 National Championship but did not win the conference championship.

== Men's basketball ==
The Pacific Coast Conference began playing basketball in the 1915–16 season. The PCC was split into North and South Divisions for basketball beginning with the 1922–23 season. The winners of the two divisions would play a best of three series of games to determine the PCC basketball champion. If two division teams tied, they would have a one–game playoff to produce the division representative. Starting with the first NCAA Men's Basketball Championship in 1939, the winner of the PCC divisional playoff was given the automatic berth in the NCAA tournament. Oregon, the 1939 PCC champion, won the championship game in the 1939 NCAA Men's Division I Basketball Tournament.

The last divisional playoff was in the 1954–55 season. After that, there was no divisional play and all teams played each other in a round robin competition. From the 1955–56 season through the 1958–59 season, the regular season conference champion was awarded the NCAA tournament berth from the PCC. In the case of a tie, a tie breaker rule was used to determine the NCAA tournament representative.

Beginning with the 1975 NCAA Men's Division I Basketball Tournament, the Pac–10 would usually place at least one other at–large team in the tournament.

By the 1985–86 season, the Pac–10 was one of three remaining conferences that gave their automatic NCAA tournament bid to the regular season round–robin champion. The other two conferences were the Ivy League and the Big Ten Conference.

The modern Pac–12 Conference men's basketball tournament format began in 1987. It was dropped after 1990 upon opposition from coaches and poor revenue and attendance.

The tournament was restarted by an 8–2 vote of the athletic directors of the conference in 2000 after determining that a tournament would help increase exposure of the conference and help the seeding of the schools in the NCAA tournament.

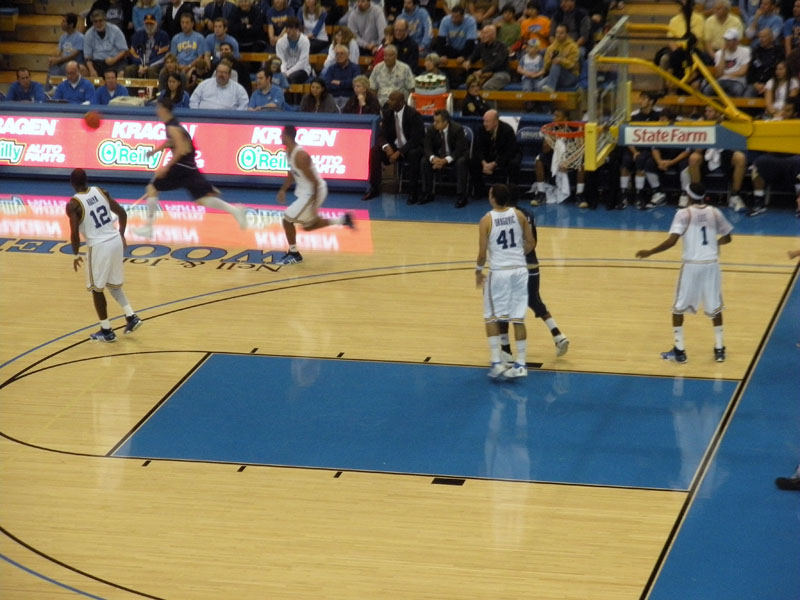
UCLA basketball game at Pauley Pavilion

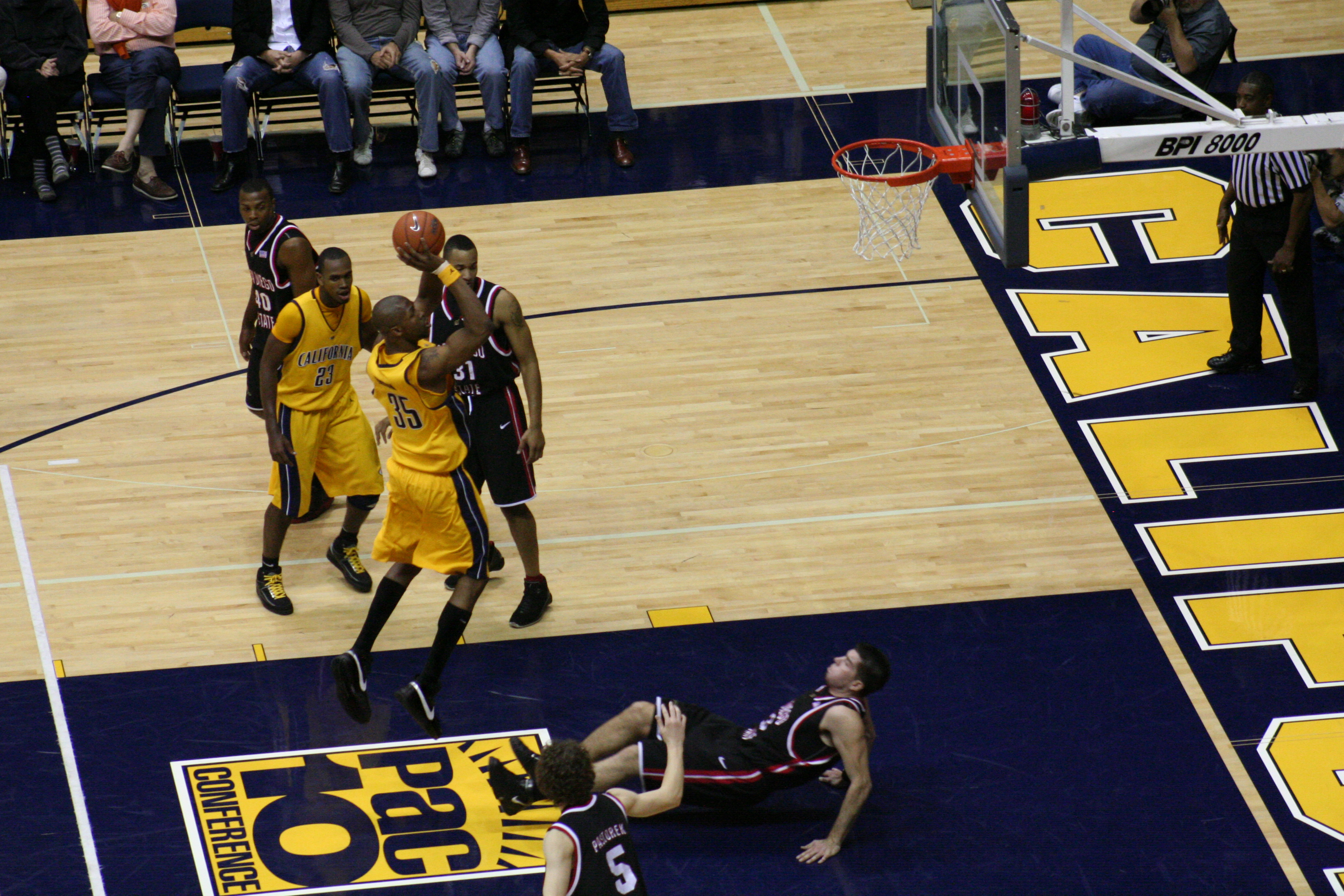
Cal versus San Diego State at Haas Pavilion

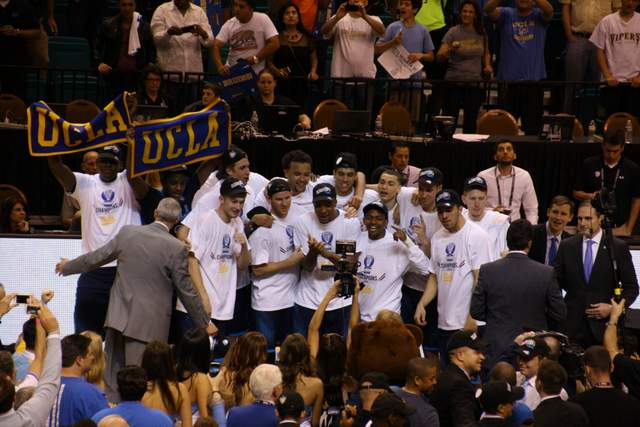
UCLA celebrating 2014 Pac–12 tournament championship

Season	Champion	
Season	Regular season(#)	Conference tournament (#)
1915–16	California (1)	
1915–16	Oregon State (1)	
1916–17	Washington State (Note: Though the first national championship tournament was not held until 1939, the Helms Athletic Foundation retroactively selected national champions for prior years, including Washington State for 1917.)	
1917–18	No official conference competition	
1918–19	Oregon (1)	
1919–20	Stanford (1)	
1920–21	California (2)	
1920–21	Stanford (2)	
1921–22	Idaho (1)	
1922–23	Idaho (2)	
1923–24	California (3)	
1924–25	California (4)	
1925–26	California (5)	
1926–27	California (6)	
1927–28	USC (1)	
1928–29	California (7)	
1929–30	USC (2)	
1930–31	Washington (1)	
1931–32	California (8)	
1932–33	Oregon State (2)	
1933–34	Washington (2)	
1934–35	USC (3)	
1935–36	Stanford (3)	
1936–37	Stanford (4)	
1937–38	Stanford (5)	
1938–39	**Oregon** (2)	
1939–40	USC (4)	
1940–41	Washington State (2)	
1941–42	**Stanford** (6)	
1942–43	Washington (3)	
1943–44	California (9) (Note: Utah was national champion in 1944, prior to its joining the Pac-12 in 2011.)	
1943–44	Washington (4)	
1944–45	Oregon (3)	
1944–45	UCLA (1)	
1945–46	California (10)	
1946–47	Oregon State (3)	
1947–48	Washington (5)	
1948–49	Oregon State (4)	
1949–50	UCLA (2)	
1950–51	Washington (6)	
1951–52	UCLA (3)	
1952–53	Washington (7)	
1953–54	USC (5)	
1954–55	Oregon State (5)	
1955–56	UCLA (4)	
1956–57	California (11)	
1957–58	California (12)	
1957–58	Oregon State (6)	
1958–59	**California** (13)	
1959–60	California (14)	
1960–61	USC (6)	
1961–62	UCLA (5)	
1962–63	Stanford (7)	
1962–63	UCLA (6)	
1963–64	**UCLA** (7)	
1964–65	**UCLA** (8)	
1965–66	Oregon State (7)	
1966–67	**UCLA** (9)	
1967–68	**UCLA** (10)	
1968–69	**UCLA** (11)	
1969–70	**UCLA** (12)	
1970–71	**UCLA** (13)	
1971–72	**UCLA** (14)	
1972–73	**UCLA** (15)	
1973–74	UCLA (16)	
1974–75	**UCLA** (17)	
1975–76	UCLA (18)	
1976–77	UCLA (19)	
1977–78	UCLA (20)	
1978–79	UCLA (21)	
1979–80	Oregon State (8)	
1980–81	Oregon State (9)	
1981–82	Oregon State (10)	
1982–83	UCLA (22)	
1983–84	Oregon State (11)	
1983–84	Washington (8)	
1984–85	USC (7)	
1984–85	Washington (9)	
1985–86	Arizona (1)	
1986–87	UCLA (23)	UCLA (1)
1987–88	Arizona (2)	Arizona (1)
1988–89	Arizona (3)	Arizona (2)
1989–90	Arizona (4)	Arizona (3)
1989–90	Oregon State (12)	Arizona (3)
1990–91	Arizona (5)	
1991–92	UCLA (24)	
1992–93	Arizona (6)	
1993–94	Arizona (7)	
1994–95	**UCLA** (25)	
1995–96	UCLA (26)	
1996–97	UCLA (27) (Note: Arizona was national champion in 1997, though it did not win the conference.)	
1997–98	Arizona (8)	
1998–99	Stanford (8)	
1999–00	Arizona (9)	
1999–00	Stanford (9)	
2000–01	Stanford (10)	
2001–02	Oregon (4)	Arizona (4)
2002–03	Arizona (10)	Oregon (1)
2003–04	Stanford (11)	Stanford (1)
2004–05	Arizona (11)	Washington (1)
2005–06	UCLA (28)	UCLA (2)
2006–07	UCLA (29)	Oregon (2)
2007–08	UCLA (30)	UCLA (3)
2008–09	Washington (10)	USC (1)
2009–10	California (15)	Washington (2)
2010–11	Arizona (12)	Washington (3)
2011–12	Washington (11)	Colorado (1)
2012–13	UCLA (31)	Oregon (3)
2013–14	Arizona (13)	UCLA (4)
2014–15	Arizona (14)	Arizona (5)
2015–16	Oregon (5)	Oregon (4)
2016–17	Arizona (15)	Arizona (6)
2016–17	Oregon (6)	Arizona (6)
2017–18	Arizona (16)	Arizona (7)
2018–19	Washington (12)	Oregon (5)
2019–20	Oregon (7)	Cancelled—COVID-19 pandemic
2020–21	Oregon (8)	Oregon State (1)
2021–22	Arizona (17)	Arizona (8)
2022–23	UCLA (32)	Arizona (9)
2023–24	Arizona (18)	Oregon (6)

Bold text denotes National Champion.

== Women's basketball ==
		Conf			Ovrl		
Year	Team	W	L	Pct	W	L	Pct
1986–87	USC (1)	15	3	0.833	22	8	0.733
1987–88	Washington (1)	16	2	0.889	25	5	0.833
1988–89	Stanford (1)	18	0	1.000	28	3	0.903
1989–90	**Stanford (2)**	17	1	0.944	32	1	0.970
1989–90	Washington (2)	17	1	0.944	28	3	0.903
1990–91	Stanford (3)	16	2	0.889	26	6	0.813
1991–92	**Stanford (4)**	15	3	0.833	30	3	0.909
1992–93	Stanford (5)	15	3	0.833	26	6	0.813
1993–94	USC(2)	16	2	0.887	26	4	0.867
1994–95	Stanford (6)	17	1	0.944	30	3	0.909
1995–96	Stanford (7)	18	0	1.000	29	3	0.906
1996–97	Stanford (8)	18	0	1.000	34	2	0.944
1997–98	Stanford (9)	17	1	0.944	21	6	0.778
1998–99	Oregon (1)	15	3	0.833	25	6	0.806
1998–99	UCLA (1)	15	3	0.833	26	8	0.765
1999–00	Oregon (2)	14	4	0.778	23	8	0.742
2000–01	Arizona State (1)	12	6	0.667	20	11	0.645
2000–01	Stanford (10)	12	6	0.667	19	11	0.633
2000–01	Washington (3)	12	6	0.667	22	10	0.688
2001–02	Stanford (11)	18	0	1.000	32	3	0.914
2002–03	Stanford (12)	15	3	0.833	27	5	0.844
2003–04	Arizona (1)	14	4	0.778	24	9	0.727
2003–04	Stanford (13)	14	4	0.778	27	7	0.794
2004–05	Stanford (14)	17	1	0.944	32	3	0.914
2005–06	Stanford (15)	15	3	0.833	26	8	0.765
2006–07	Stanford (16)	17	1	0.944	28	4	0.875
2007–08	Stanford (17)	16	2	0.889	35	4	0.897
2008–09	Stanford (18)	17	1	0.941	26	4	0.867
2009–10	Stanford (19)	18	0	1.000	31	1	0.969
2010–11	Stanford (20)	18	0	1.000	29	2	0.935
2011–12	Stanford (21)	18	0	1.000	31	1	0.969
2012–13	California (1)	17	1	0.944	28	3	0.903
2012–13	Stanford (22)	17	1	0.944	31	2	0.939
2013–14	Stanford (23)	17	1	0.944	32	3	0.914
2014–15	Oregon State (1)	16	2	0.889	27	5	0.844
2015–16	Oregon State (2)	16	2	0.889	32	5	0.865
2015–16	Arizona State (2)	16	2	0.889	27	6	0.818
2016–17	Oregon State (3)	16	2	0.889	31	5	0.861
2017–18	Oregon (3)	16	2	0.889	33	5	0.868
2018–19	Oregon (4)	16	2	0.889	33	5	0.868
2019–20	Oregon (5)	17	1	0.944	31	2	0.939
2020–21	**Stanford (24)**	19	2	0.905	31	2	0.939
2021–22	Stanford (25)	16	0	1.000	25	3	0.893
2022–23	Stanford (26)	15	3	0.833	27	4	0.871
2022–23	Utah (1)	15	3	0.833	25	3	0.893
2023–24	Stanford (27)	15	3	0.833	26	4	0.867

Bold text denotes National Champion.

== Beach volleyball ==
The Pac–12 first sponsored beach volleyball in the 2016 season (2015–16 school year). According to the Pac–12, the conference "did not record official league standings during the inaugural season of Beach Volleyball." To this day, the conference has never recorded official league standings in the sport. The regular season is followed by a conference tournament, with championships held both for pairs and teams (consisting of five pairs).

Year	Team	Conf			Overall			Runner–up	Tournament winner
Year	Team	W	L	Pct	W	L	Pct	Runner–up	Tournament winner
2016	**USC**	7	0	1.000	34	2	.944	Arizona	USC
2017	**USC**	9	0	1.000	38	1	.974	UCLA	USC
2018	**UCLA**	9	1	.900	40	4	.909	USC	UCLA
2019	**UCLA**	10	1	.909	35	3	.921	USC	USC
2020	No Season due to Covid	―	―	―	―	―	―	―	―
2021	UCLA	10	0	1.000	32	5	.865	**USC**	UCLA
2022	**USC**	0	0	–	37	1	.974	**USC**	UCLA
2023	UCLA	0	0	–	37	3	.925	**USC**	UCLA
2024	**USC**	0	0	–	29	4	.879	UCLA	USC

Bold text denotes National Champion.

== Men's cross country ==
Season	Team Champion (#)	Runner up	Individual Champion
1969	Oregon (1)	Washington State	Gerry Lindgren, Washington State
1970	Oregon (2)	Washington State	Steve Prefontaine, Oregon
1971	Washington State (1)	**Oregon**	Steve Prefontaine, Oregon
1972	Washington State (2)	Oregon	John Ngeno, Washington State
1973	**Oregon (3)**	Washington State	Steve Prefontaine, Oregon
1974	Washington State (3)	**Oregon**	John Ngeno, Washington State
1975	Washington State (4)	Oregon	Joshua Kimeto, Washington State
1976	Oregon (4)	Washington State	Henry Rono, Washington State
1977	**Oregon (5)**	Washington	Joel Cheryuiot, Washington State
1978	Oregon (6)	Washington State	Henry Rono, Washington State
1979	Oregon (7)	Washington State	Henry Rono, Washington State
1980	UCLA (1)	Arizona	Ron Cornell, UCLA
1981	UCLA (2)	Arizona	Richard Tuwei, Washington State
1982	Oregon (8)	UCLA	Jim Hill, Oregon
1983	Arizona (1)	Oregon	Jim Hill, Oregon
1984	Arizona (2)	Washington State	Tom Ansberry, Arizona
1985	Stanford (1)	Oregon	Marc Olesen, Stanford
1986	Arizona (3)	Oregon	Aaron Ramirez, Arizona
1987	Arizona (4)	Oregon	Matt Giusto, Arizona
1988	Oregon (9)	Stanford	Brad Hudson, Oregon
1989	Oregon (10)	Washington	Marc Davis, Arizona
1990	Oregon (11)	Arizona	Marc Davis, Arizona
1991	Arizona (5)	Oregon	Colin Dalton, Oregon
1992	Oregon (12)	Arizona	Josephat Kapkory, Washington State
1993	Washington (1)	Washington State	Josephat Kapkory, Washington State
1994	Arizona (6)	Washington	Martin Keino, Arizona
1995	Oregon (13)	Stanford	Karl Keska, Oregon
1996	**Stanford (2)**	Oregon	Mebrahtom Keflezighi, UCLA
1997	**Stanford (3)**	Oregon	Bernard Lagat, Washington State
1998	Stanford (4)	Oregon	Abdi Abdirahman, Arizona
1999	Arizona (7)	Stanford	Steve Fein, Oregon
2000	Stanford (5)	Oregon	Jonathon Riley, Stanford
2001	Stanford (6)	Arizona State	Grant Robison, Stanford
2002	**Stanford (7)**	Oregon	Grant Robison, Stanford
2003	**Stanford (8)**	Oregon	Ian Dobson, Stanford
2004	Stanford (9)	Arizona State	Robert Cheseret, Arizona
2005	Stanford (10)	Arizona	Robert Cheseret, Arizona
2006	Oregon (14)	Stanford	Galen Rupp, Oregon
2007	**Oregon (15)**	Stanford	Shadrack Kiptoo–Biwott, Oregon
2008	**Oregon (16)**	Stanford	Galen Rupp, Oregon
2009	Stanford (11)	Oregon	Chris Derrick, Stanford
2010	Stanford (12)	Oregon	Elliott Heath, Stanford
2011	Colorado (1)	Stanford	Lawi Lalang, Arizona
2012	Colorado (2)	Stanford	Lawi Lalang, Arizona
2013	**Colorado (3)**	Oregon	Edward Cheserek, Oregon
2014	**Colorado (4)**	Oregon	Edward Cheserek, Oregon
2015	Colorado (5)	Stanford	Edward Cheserek, Oregon
2016	Colorado (6)	Stanford	Edward Cheserek, Oregon
2017	Stanford (13)	Colorado	Grant Fisher, Stanford
2018	Stanford (14)	Washington	Grant Fisher, Stanford
2019	Colorado (7)	Oregon	Joe Klecker, Colorado
2020	Stanford (15)	Colorado	Eduardo Herrera, Colorado
2021	Colorado (8)	Stanford	Charles Hicks, Stanford
2022	Stanford (16)	Colorado	Charles Hicks, Stanford
2023	Stanford (17)	Washington	Ky Robinson, Stanford
2026	Gonzaga (1)	Utah State	Solomon Kipchoge, Washington State

Bold text denotes National Champion.
Note: Oregon won the 1974 National Title. Colorado won the 2001, 2004 & 2006 National Title but was not a member of the Pac–12

== Women's cross country ==
Season	Team Champion (#)	Runner up	Individual Champion
1986	Oregon (1)	UCLA	Penny Graves, Oregon
1987	**Oregon (2)**	UCLA	Annette Hand, Oregon
1988	Oregon (3)	UCLA	Liz Wilson, Oregon
1989	Washington (1)	Washington State	Jennifer Robertson, Washington State
1990	Oregon (4)	Washington	Liz Wilson, Oregon
1991	Oregon (5)	Arizona	Lisa Karnopp, Oregon
1992	Oregon (6)	Washington	Nicole Woodward, Oregon
1993	Stanford (1)	Arizona	Karen Hecox, UCLA
1994	Stanford (2)	Oregon	Karen Hecox, UCLA
1995	Oregon (7)	Arizona	Amy Skieresz, Arizona
1996	Stanford (3)	Washington	Amy Skieresz, Arizona
1997	**Stanford (4)**	Oregon; Washington	Amy Skieresz, Arizona
1998	Stanford (5)	Washington	Amy Skieresz, Arizona
1999	Stanford (6)	Arizona State	Erin Sullivan, Stanford
2000	Stanford (7)	Arizona State	Tara Chaplin, Arizona
2001	Stanford (8)	Arizona	Lauren Fleshman, Stanford
2002	Stanford (9)	Arizona State	Sara Bei, Stanford
2003	**Stanford (10)**	Arizona State	Sara Bei, Stanford
2004	Stanford (11)	Arizona State	Amy Hastings, Arizona State
2005	**Stanford (12)**	Arizona State	Arianna Lambie, Stanford
2006	**Stanford (13)**	Arizona State	Arianna Lambie, Stanford
2007	**Stanford (14)**	Oregon	Arianna Lambie, Stanford
2008	**Washington (2)**	Oregon	Kendra Schaaf, Washington
2009	Washington (3)	Oregon	Nicole Blood, Oregon
2010	Stanford (15)	Arizona	Jordan Hasay, Oregon
2011	Colorado (1)	Washington	Katie Flood, Washington
2012	**Oregon (8)**	Arizona	Kathy Kroeger, Stanford
2013	Arizona (1)	Colorado	Aisling Cuffe, Stanford
2014	Oregon (9)	Stanford	Shelby Houlihan, Arizona State
2015	Colorado (2)	Oregon	Aisling Cuffe, Stanford
2016	Colorado (3)	Washington	Amy–Eloise Neale, Washington
2017	Colorado (4)	**Oregon**	Dani Jones, Colorado
2018	Oregon (10)	**Colorado**	Dani Jones, Colorado
2019	Stanford (16)	Washington	Fiona O'Keeffe, Stanford
2020	Stanford (17)	Colorado	Haley Herberg, Washington
2021	Colorado (5)	Utah	Abby Nichols, Colorado
2022	Colorado (5)	Utah	Bailey Hertenstein, Colorado
2023	Washington (4)	Stanford	Amy Bunnage, Stanford
2026	Washington State (1)	Boise State	Nelly Jemeli, Washington State

Bold text denotes National Champion.
Note: Oregon won the 2016 National Title. Colorado won the 2000 & 2004 National Title but was not a member of the Pac–12

== Men's golf ==
Season	Team Champion (#)	Runner up	Individual Champion
1960	Stanford (1)	UCLA	Pete Choate (1), Stanford
1961	Washington (1)	USC	Clint Names, Washington
1962	USC (1)	Stanford	Pete Choate (2), Stanford
1963	Washington (2)	USC	Dave Stockton, USC
1964	USC (2)	Washington	Sherman Finger (1), USC
1965	USC (3)	UCLA	Sherman Finger (2), USC
1966	USC (4)	Stanford	Sherman Finger (3), USC
1967	USC (5)	Stanford	Kemp Richardson (1), USC
1968	Stanford (2)	USC	Kemp Richardson (2), USC
1969	USC (6)	Stanford	Bob Allard, Oregon State; Bruce Osborne, USC; Sandy Adelman, Stanford
1970	Stanford (3)	Oregon	Peter Laszlo, UCLA; Allan Tapie, USC; Gary Sanders, USC; Craig Griswold (1), Oregon
1971	USC (7)	Stanford	Scott Masingill, Oregon State
1972	USC (8)	Washington	Craig Griswold (2), Oregon
1973	USC (9)	Stanford	Mark Pfeil, USC
1974	Stanford (4)	USC	Peter Jacobsen (1), Oregon
1975	USC (10)	Stanford	Scott Simpson (1), USC
1976	Oregon (1) ― North; USC (11) ― South	Washington ― North; Stanford ― South	Peter Jacobsen (2), Oregon ― North; Scott Simpson (2), USC ― South
1977	Oregon (2) ― North; Stanford (5) ― South	Washington ― North; USC ― South	Phil Currie, Oregon ― North; Mike Peck (1), Stanford ― South; Larry Collins, USC ― South
1978	USC (12)	Stanford	Brent Murray, Oregon; Mike Peck (2), Stanford
1979	Arizona State (1)	Arizona	Scott Watkins, Arizona State; Dan Croonquist, Arizona State
1980	USC (13)	Arizona State	Jim Bertoncino, Arizona State; Jack Skilling, Stanford; Craig Steinberg, USC
1981	Arizona State (2)	USC	Dan Forsman, Arizona State; Tony Grimes, Arizona State
1982	UCLA (1)	Arizona State	Corey Pavin, UCLA
1983	UCLA (2)	USC	Steve Pate, UCLA; Sam Randolph, USC
1984	USC (14)	Stanford	Paul Nolen, Arizona; Mike Blewett, USC
1985	UCLA (3)	Oregon	Duffy Waldorf, UCLA
1986	USC (15)	Oregon	Don Walsworth, Stanford
1987	Arizona (1)	Arizona State; UCLA	Larry Silveira, Arizona
1988	Washington (3)	Arizona	O.D. Vincent, Washington
1989	Arizona State (3)	Arizona	Christian Cévaër (1), Stanford
1990	**Arizona State (4)**	Arizona	**Phil Mickelson**, Arizona State
1991	Arizona (2)	Arizona State	Manny Zerman, Arizona
1992	Stanford (5)	Arizona State	Christian Cévaër (2), Stanford
1993	Arizona State (5)	Arizona	Jason Gore (1), Arizona
1994	**Stanford (6)**	Arizona	Jason Gore (2), Arizona
1995	Arizona State (6)	California	Charlie Wi, California
1996	**Arizona State (7)**	USC	**Tiger Woods**, Stanford
1997	Arizona State (8)	Oregon	Scott Johnson, Arizona State
1998	Arizona State (9)	UCLA	Paul Casey (1), Arizona State
1999	Arizona State (10)	UCLA	Paul Casey (2), Arizona State
2000	Arizona State (11)	Oregon State	Paul Casey (3), Arizona State
2001	USC (16)	Arizona State	Ricky Barnes, Arizona
2002	USC (17)	Stanford	Jim Seki, Stanford
2003	UCLA (4)	Arizona	John Merrick, UCLA
2004	Arizona (3)	Arizona State	Henry Liaw, Arizona
2005	Arizona State (12); Washington (4)	Arizona	Erik Olson, Washington
2006	UCLA (5)	Washington	Daniel Im, UCLA
2007	USC (18)	UCLA	**Jamie Lovemark**, USC
2008	Arizona State (13)†	USC	Creighton Honeck, Arizona
2009	Washington (5)	Oregon	Darren Wallace, Washington
2010	Washington (6)	Stanford	Eric Mina, California
2011	USC (19)†	Oregon	Martin Trainer, USC
2012	California (1)†	Oregon	Andrew Yun, Stanford
2013	California (2)	UCLA	**Max Homa**, California
2014	Stanford (6)	Washington	Patrick Rodgers, Stanford
2015	Stanford (7)	Oregon	Maverick McNealy, Stanford
2016	Stanford (8)	California	Jon Rahm, Arizona State
2017	Oregon (3)	Stanford	Wyndham Clark, Oregon
2018	USC (20)	Colorado	Justin Suh, USC
2019	**Stanford (9)**	UCLA	Collin Morikawa, California
2020	Canceled due to COVID-19	―	―
2021	Arizona (4)	Arizona State	Brad Reeves, Arizona
2022	Washington (7)	Stanford	Noah Woolsey, Washington
2023	Stanford (10)	Arizona State	Michael Thorbjornsen, Stanford
2024	Arizona State (14)	California	Karl Vilips, Stanford

Bold text denotes National Champion.
Note: Arizona won the 1992 National Title. Arizona State was the 1994 Co―National Champions. California won the 2004 National Title. Oregon won the 2016 National Title. Stanford won the 2007 National Title. UCLA won the 2008 & 1988 National Titles
Note: Scott Simpson (USC) won the 1977 Individual National Title. Ron Commans (USC) won the 1981 Individual National Title. Jim Carter (ASU) won the 1983 Individual National Title. Phil Mickelson (ASU) won the 1989 & 1992 Individual National Titles. Todd Demsey (ASU) won the 1993 Individual National Titles. Alejandro Cañizares (ASU) won the 2003 Individual National Title. James Lepp (Washington) won the 2005 Individual National Title. Kevin Chappell (UCLA) won the 2008 Individual National Title. Cameron Wilson (Stanford) won the 2014 Individual National Title. Aaron Wise (Oregon) won the 2016 Individual National Title.

== Women's golf ==
Season	Team Champion (#)	Runner up	Individual Champion
1987	Arizona State (1)	USC	Danielle Ammaccapane, Arizona State
1988	Arizona State (2)	UCLA	Pam Wright, Arizona State
1989	USC (1)	Arizona State	Pearl Sinn, Arizona State
1990	UCLA (1)	Arizona	Brandie Burton, Arizona State
1991	**UCLA (2)**	Arizona	Lisa Kiggens, UCLA
1992	Arizona (1)	Arizona State	Annika Sorenstam, Arizona
1993	**Arizona State (3)**	UCLA	Wendy Ward (1), Arizona State
1994	**Arizona State (4)**	USC	Jennifer Biehn, USC
1995	**Arizona State (5)**	UCLA	Wendy Ward (2), Arizona State
1996	Arizona State (6)	UCLA	**Marisa Baena**, Arizona
1997	Arizona (2)	**Arizona State**	Mhairi McKay, Stanford
1998	Arizona (3)	**Arizona State**	Jenna Daniels, Arizona
1999	Stanford (1)	Arizona	**Grace Park**, Arizona State
2000	**Arizona (4)**	Stanford	Candie Kung, USC
2001	Arizona (5)	Stanford	Lorena Ochoa, Arizona
2002	Arizona (6)	UCLA	Jimin Kang, Arizona State
2003	California (1)	Arizona	Vikki Laing, California
2004	**UCLA (3)**	California	Charlotte Mayorkas, UCLA
2005	UCLA (4)	Arizona State	Louise Stahle, Arizona State
2006	UCLA (5)	Arizona State	Paige Mackenzie, Washington
2007	Arizona State (7)	UCLA	Tiffany Joh, UCLA
2008	**USC (2)**	UCLA	Paola Moreno, USC
2009	**Arizona State (8)**	USC	Carlota Ciganda (1), Arizona State
2010	Arizona (7)	UCLA	Carlota Ciganda (2), Arizona State
2011	USC (3)	Arizona	Sophia Popov, USC
2012	California (2)	USC	Doris Chen, USC
2013	**USC (4)**	Washington	**Annie Park**, USC
2014	Stanford (2)	Arizona	Alison Lee, UCLA
2015	Arizona (8)	Oregon	Caroline Inglis, Oregon
2016	USC (5)	UCLA	Linnea Strom, Arizona State
2017	UCLA (6)	Colorado	Lilia Vu, UCLA
2018	UCLA (7)	USC	Patty Tavatanakit, UCLA
2019	USC (6)	Arizona	Olivia Mehaffey, Arizona State
2020	Canceled due to COVID-19	―	―
2021	USC (7)	Stanford	**Rachel Heck**, Stanford
2022	Oregon (1)	**Stanford**	Hsin–Yu (Cynthia) Lu, Oregon
2023	USC (8)	Oregon	**Rose Zhang**, Stanford
2024	**Stanford** (3)	USC	Catherine Park, Stanford

Bold text denotes National Champion.
Note: Arizona won the 1996 & 2018 National Title. Arizona State won the 1990 & 2017 National Title. Stanford won the 2015 National Title. USC won the 2003 National Title. UCLA won the 2011 National Title. Washington won the 2016 National Title
Note: Susan Slaughter (ASU) won the 1990 Individual National Title. Annika Sorenstam (Arizona) won the 1991 Individual National Title. Emilee Klein (Arizona State) won the 1991 Individual National Title. Kristel Mourgue d’Algue (Arizona State) won the 1995 Individual National Title. Jennifer Rosales (USC) won the 1995 Individual National Title. Jenna Daniels (USC) won the 2000 Individual National Title. Mikaela Parmlid (USC) won the 2003 Individual National Title. Sarah Huarte (California) won the 2004 Individual National Title. Dewi Schreefel (USC) won the 2006 Individual National Title. Azahara Muñoz (Arizona State) won the 2008 Individual National Title. Doris Chen (USC) won the 2014 Individual National Title. Monica Vaughn (2017) won the 2017 Individual National Title. Rose Zhang (2022) won the 2022 Individual National Title.

== Women's gymnastics ==
Season	Team Champion (#)	Runner up	All–Around Champion
1987	UCLA (1)	Arizona	Tanya Service, UCLA; Yumi Modre, Washington
1988	UCLA (2)	Arizona State	Jill Andrews, UCLA
1989	UCLA (3)	Oregon State	Joy Selig, Oregon State
1990	UCLA (4)	Arizona	Jill Andrews, UCLA
1991	Oregon State (1)	UCLA	Joy Selig, Oregon State
1992	Oregon State (2)	Arizona	Chari Knight, Oregon State
1993	UCLA (5)	Oregon State	Kareema Marrow, UCLA
1994	Oregon State (3)	UCLA	Leah Homma, UCLA
1995	UCLA (6)	Arizona State	Stella Umeh, UCLA
1996	Oregon State (4)	Arizona State	Heidi Hornbeek, Arizona
1997	**UCLA** (7)	Stanford	Leah Homma, UCLA
1998	Stanford (1)	Oregon State	Stella Umeh, UCLA
1999	UCLA (8)	Oregon State	Heidi Moneymaker, UCLA
2000	**UCLA** (9)	Oregon State	Mohini Bhardwaj, UCLA
2001	Stanford (2)	**UCLA**	Mohini Bhardwaj, UCLA
2002	UCLA (10)	Arizona	Onnie Willis, UCLA
2003	**UCLA** (11)	Stanford	Kate Richardson, UCLA
2004	Stanford (3)	**UCLA**	Natalie Foley, Stanford
2005	UCLA (12)	Arizona	Kristen Maloney, UCLA; **Tasha Schwikert, UCLA**
2006	Stanford (4)	UCLA	Tabitha Yim, Stanford
2007	UCLA (13)	Stanford	Tasha Schwikert, UCLA
2008	Stanford (5)	Oregon State	Tabitha Yim, Stanford
2009	UCLA (14)	Oregon State	Carly Janiga, Stanford
2010	**UCLA** (15)	Stanford	Vanessa Zamarripa, UCLA
2011	Oregon State (5)	UCLA	Leslie Mak, Oregon State
2012	UCLA (16)	Utah	Corrie Lothrop, Utah
2013	Oregon State (6)	UCLA	Vanessa Zamarripa, UCLA
2014	Utah (1)	Stanford	Tory Wilson, Utah
2015	Utah (2)	UCLA	Georgia Dabritz, Utah
2016	UCLA (17)	Oregon State & Utah (tie)	Breanna Hughes, Utah
2017	Utah (3)	Oregon State	MyKayla Skinner, Utah
2018	**UCLA** (18)	Utah	Kyla Ross, UCLA; MyKayla Skinner, Utah
2019	UCLA (19)	Utah	Kyla Ross, UCLA
2020	Canceled due to the coronavirus outbreak in the USA		
2021	Utah (4)	California	Maile O'Keefe, Utah
2022	Utah (5)	California	Jade Carey, Oregon State
2023	Utah (6)	UCLA	Jade Carey, Oregon State
2024	Utah (7)	UCLA	Selena Harris, UCLA

Note: Bold denotes NCAA team or all–around champion.
Note: The Pac–10 added gymnastics in the 1987 season. Prior to the Pac–10 fielding gymnastics championships, Jackie Brummer from Arizona State won the NCAA gymnastics championship.
Note: The following gymnasts won the NCAA all–around title without winning the Pac–10 all–around title: 2001: Onnie Willis, UCLA; 2002: Jamie Dantzscher, UCLA; 2008: Tasha Schwikert, UCLA; 2015: Samantha Peszek, UCLA

== Women's lacrosse ==
Season	Regular Season Champion (#)	Tournament champion (#)
2018	Colorado (1)	Stanford (1)
2019	USC (1)	USC (1)
2020	―	―
2021	Stanford (1)	Stanford (2)
2022	Stanford (2); USC (2)	Stanford (3)
2023	USC (3)	USC (2)
2024	Stanford (3)	TBD

Note: Bold denotes NCAA team champion.
Note: The 2020 Season was stopped due to the COVID–19 Pandemic.

== Men's rowing ==
Year	Team	Title
1960	California	1
1961	Washington	1
1962	Washington	2
1963	Washington	3
1964	California	2
1965	Washington	4
1966	Washington	5
1967	UCLA	1
1968	Washington	6
1969	Washington	7
1970	UCLA	2
1971	Washington	8
1972	Washington	9
1973	Washington	10
1974	Washington	11
1975	Washington	12
1976	Washington	13
1977	Washington	14
1978	Washington	15
1979	California	3
1980	Washington	16
1981	Washington	17
1982	California	4
1983	Washington	18
1984	Washington	19
1985	Washington	20
1986	California	5
1987	UCLA	3
1988	UCLA	4
1989	UCLA	5
1990	Washington	21
1991	Washington	22
1992	Washington	23
1993	Washington	24
1994	California	6
1995	Washington	23
1996	Washington	24
1997	Washington	25
1998	California	7
1999	California	8
2000	California	9
2001	California	10
2002	California	11
2003	California	12
2004	Washington	26
2005	California	13
2006	California	14
2007	Washington	27
2008	Washington	28
2009	California	15
2010	Washington	29
2011	Washington	30
2012	Washington	31
2013	Washington	32
2014	Washington	33
2015	Washington	34
2016	California	16
2017	Washington	35
2018	Washington	36
2019	Washington	37
2020	―	―
2021	Washington	38
2022	California	17
2023	California	18
2024	Washington	39

Note: Bold denotes NCAA team champion.
Note: The 2020 Season was stopped due to the COVID–19 Pandemic.

== Women's rowing ==
Year	Team	Title
1987	Washington	1
1988	Washington	2
1989	Washington	3
1990	UCLA	1
1991	UCLA	2
1992	Washington	4
1993	Washington	5
1994	California	1
1995	Washington	6
1996	Washington	7
1997	**Washington**	8
1998	**Washington**	9
1999	Washington	10
2000	Washington	11
2001	**Washington**	12
2002	Washington	13
2003	Washington	14
2004	California	2
2005	**California**	3
2006	**California**	4
2007	USC	1
2008	California	5
2009	California	6
2010	California	7
2011	California	8
2012	California	9
2013	California	10
2014	Stanford	1
2015	California	11
2016	**California**	12
2017	**Washington**	15
2018	Washington	16
2019	**Washington**	17
2020	―	―
2021	Washington	18
2022	Stanford	2
2023	**Stanford**	3
2024	Stanford	4

Note: Bold denotes NCAA team champion.
Note: The 2020 Season was stopped due to the COVID–19 Pandemic.
Note: California won the 2018 National Title.Stanford won the 2009 National Title.

== Men's soccer ==
The conference established men's soccer as a sponsored sport beginning in the 2000 academic year. Prior to then, most members who fielded a men's collegiate soccer team competed in the Mountain Pacific Sports Federation.

		Conf	Ovrl		Conf	Ovrl
Season	Champion	W–L–T	W–L–T	Runner–up	W–L–T	W–L–T
2000	Washington	7–1–0	14–6	Stanford	6–2–0	18–3–1
2001	Stanford	6–1–1	19–2–1	UCLA	5–2–1	12–7–4
2002	**UCLA**	8–2–0	16–3–3	California	6–3–1	14–6–2
2003	UCLA	10–0–0	20–2–1	Oregon State	7–3–0	13–7–0
2004	UCLA	6–2–0	14–4–2	California	4–3–1	13–4–3
2005	UCLA	7–1–2	12–5–3	California	6–3–1	14–4–3
2006	California	7–3–0	13–6–1	San Diego State	5–2–3	9–6–4
2007	California	6–3–1	12–6–2	San Diego State; Stanford; UCLA	4–4–2	8–7–4; 7–6–5; 9–9–3
2008	UCLA	7–1–2	10–5–6	California	5–2–3	12–4–5
2009	UCLA	5–1–4	12–4–4	Oregon State	5–4–1	19–6–3
2010	California	8–1–1	14–2–4	UCLA	8–2–0	16–5–1
2011	UCLA	10–0–0	18–4–2	Washington	7–3–0	12–4–2
2012	UCLA	8–1–1	13–3–3	Washington	7–1–2	13–5–3
2013	Washington	7–1–2	16–2–4	UCLA	6–1–3	12–3–5
2014	Stanford	6–1–3	13–3–3	UCLA	6–2–2	14–4–6
2015	**Stanford**	7–1–2	18–2–3	UCLA	5–4–1	11–9–1
2016	**Stanford**	8–1–1	14–3–4	Washington	6–4–0	14–7–0
2016	**Stanford**	8–1–1	14–3–4	Washington	6–4–0	14–7–0
2017	**Stanford**	9–0–1	19–2–2	California	6–4–0	11–7–0
2018	Stanford	7–2–1	12–4–5	Oregon State	6–3–1	11–6–3
2019	Washington	8–2–0	17–4–0	Stanford	6–2–2	14–3–5
2020	Stanford	7–2–1	10–3–1	Washington	7–3–0	12–4–0
2021	Oregon State	7–1–2	14–2–4	Washington	6–1–2	18–2–2
2022	Washington	7–1–2	15–2–3	Stanford	4–2–4	12–2–6
2023	UCLA	6–0–4	9–4–5	Oregon State	4–1–5	11–5–5
2024	N/A					
2025	N/A					
2026	Oregon State	4-1-1	9-4-4	Cal Baptist	3-1-2	12-3-2

Note: Arizona, Arizona State, Colorado, Oregon, USC, Utah & Washington State do not field a men's soccer team.

Bold text indicates National Champion

== Women's soccer ==
The conference established women's soccer as a sponsored sport beginning in the 1995 academic year.

		Conf	Ovrl		Conf	Ovrl
Season	Champion	W–L–T	W–L–T	Runner–Up	W–L–T	W–L–T
1993	Stanford	3–1–0	18–3–1	UCLA	2–1–0	10–6–1
1995	Stanford	7–0–0	16–4–0	UCLA	5–2–0	14–4–2
1996	Stanford	6–1–0	12–9–0	California; Washington	5–2–0	13–3–2; 12–8–0
1997	UCLA	9–0–0	19–3–0	USC	7–2–0	16–3–1
1998	California; UCLA; USC	7–2–0	13–8–0; 17–4–1; 14–7–1	Washington	6–3–0	10–9–1
1999	Stanford	7–1–1	15–5–1	USC	7–2–0	14–6–0
2000	Washington	8–1–0	18–3–0	California	7–2–0	17–3–1
2001	UCLA	8–1–0	20–3–0	Stanford	6–2–1	15–4–2
2002	Stanford	9–0–0	21–2–0	UCLA	8–1–0	18–4–0
2003	UCLA	8–0–1	20–2–3	Arizona State	6–2–1	13–5–3
2004	UCLA; Arizona	6–3–0; 6–3–0	17–6–0; 15–6–0	Washington	5–3–1	17–5–1
2005	UCLA	7–0–2	22–2–2	California	7–1–1	16–4–2
2006	UCLA	8–1–0	17–3–0	Oregon	6–1–2	12–6–2
2007	UCLA	9–0–0	18–1–2	**USC**	6–2–1	16–3–2
2008	UCLA	9–0–0	22–0–2	Stanford	8–1–0	22–1–1
2009	Stanford	9–0–0	22–0–0	UCLA	8–1–0	19–2–1
2010	Stanford	9–0–0	22–0–2	Oregon	3–5–1	7–10–3
2011	**Stanford**	11–0–0	25–0–1	UCLA	8–1–2	16–1–4
2012	Stanford	11–0–0	21–2–1	UCLA	8–2–1	18–3–2
2013	**UCLA**	9–0–2	22–1–3	Washington State	7–3–1	14–3–4
2014	UCLA	10–0–1	21–1–2	Stanford	9–1–1	20–2–2
2015	Stanford	10–0–1	19–2–2	USC	9–2–0	15–5–2
2016	Stanford	10–1–0	18–2–1	**USC**	8–2–1	18–4–2
2017	**Stanford**	11–0–0	24–1–0	UCLA	8–2–1	20–3–2
2018	Stanford	10–0–1	21–1–2	UCLA	9–2–0	17–3–2
2019	**Stanford**	11–0–0	24–1–0	UCLA	8–3–0	18–5–1
2020	UCLA	9–1–1	18–5–1	USC	6–3–2	7–3–4
2021	UCLA	8–0–3	16–1–3	USC	8–1–2	14–3–3
2022	Stanford	9–1–1	17–2–2	**UCLA**	9–2–0	18–2–0
2023	UCLA	10–0–1	16–2–1	Stanford	8–0–3	20–0–4

Bold text indicates National Champion

== Softball ==
Year	Team	Conf				Ovrl				Conf. Tournament Winner
Year	Team	W	L	T	Pct	W	L	T	Pct	Team
1987	California (1)	8	2	0	0.800	34	15	0	0.694	
1988	**UCLA (1)**	15	3	0	0.833	53	8	0	0.869	
1989	**UCLA (2)**	18	2	0	0.900	48	4	0	0.923	
1990	**UCLA (3)**	16	2	0	0.889	62	7	0	0.899	
1991	UCLA (4)	16	4	0	0.800	50	5	0	0.909	
1992	Arizona (1)	16	2	0	0.889	58	7	0	0.892	
1993	UCLA (5)	25	1	0	0.962	50	5	0	0.909	
1994	**Arizona (2)**	23	1	0	0.958	64	3	0	0.955	
1995	**UCLA (6)**	23	4	0	0.857	43	6	0	0.878	
1996	Washington (1)	23	4	0	0.852	59	9	0	0.868	
1997	**Arizona (3)**	26	1	0	0.963	61	5	0	0.924	
1998	Arizona (4)	27	1	0	0.964	67	4	0	0.944	
1999	**UCLA (7)**	22	6	0	0.786	63	6	0	0.913	
2000	Washington (2)	17	4	0	0.810	62	9	0	0.873	
2001	**Arizona (5)**	19	2	0	0.905	65	4	0	0.942	
2002	UCLA (8)	18	3	0	0.857	55	9	0	0.859	
2003	Arizona (6)	19	2	0	0.905	54	5	0	0.915	
2004	Arizona (7)	17	3	0	0.850	55	6	0	0.902	
2005	California (2); Arizona (8); Oregon State (1); Stanford (1)	13; 13; 13; 13	8; 8; 8; 8	0; 0; 0; 0	0.619; 0.619; 0.619; 0.619	52; 45; 43; 43	15; 12; 16; 16	0; 0; 0; 0	0.776; 0.789; 0.729; 0.729	
2006	**Arizona (9)**	15	5	1	0.738	44	12	1	0.773	
2007	**Arizona (10)**	15	5	1	0.738	50	14	1	0.777	
2008	**Arizona State (1)**	18	3	0	0.857	64	5	0	0.928	
2009	UCLA (9)	16	5	0	0.762	45	11	0	0.804	
2010	Washington (3)	17	4	0	0.810	44	6	0	0.880	
2011	**Arizona State (2)**	17	4	0	0.810	60	6	0	0.909	
Season	Pac–12	Record								
2012	California (3)	21	3	0	0.865	58	7	0	0.892	
2013	Oregon (1)	19	5	0	0.792	50	11	0	0.820	
2014	Oregon (2)	19	2	1	0.886	48	6	1	0.882	
2015	Oregon (3)	21	3	0	0.875	51	8	0	0.864	
2016	Oregon (4)	20	4	0	0.833	47	8	0	0.855	
2017	Arizona (11)	18	6	0	0.750	52	9	0	0.852	
2018	Oregon (5)	21	3	0	.875	53	10	0	0.841	
2019	**UCLA (10)**; Washington (4)	20; 20	4; 4	0; 0	0.833; 0.833	46; 45	5; 7	0; 0	0.902; 0.865	
2021	UCLA (11)	19	2	0	0.905	41	4	0	0.911	
2022	Arizona State (3)	20	4	0	.883	39	9	0	0.813	
2023	UCLA (12)	21	3	0	0.875	52	5	0	0.926	Utah (1)
2024	UCLA (13)	17	4	0	0.809	34	10	0	0.773	UCLA (1)

Note: UCLA won the 1992, 1995 (vacated), 2003, 2004 and 2010 National Championship but did not win the conference championship
Note: Arizona won the 1991, 1993, and 1996 National Championship but did not win the conference championship
Note: California won the 2002 National Championship but did not win the conference championship
Note: Washington won the 2009 National Championship but did not win the conference championship
Note: Washington State, Colorado, and USC do not field softball teams
Bold text indicates National Champion
Note: Pac–12 started the Conference Tournament in 2023

== Men's swim & dive ==
Season	Team Champion (#)	Runner up
1961	USC (1)	Washington
1962	USC (2)	Washington
1963	**USC (3)**	Stanford
1964	**USC (4)**	Stanford
1965	**USC (5)**	Oregon
1966	**USC (6)**	UCLA
1967	USC (7)	**Stanford**
1968	USC (8)	Stanford
1969	USC (9)	UCLA
1970	UCLA (1)	USC
1971	UCLA (2)	USC
1972	USC (10)	UCLA
1973	USC (11)	UCLA
1974	**USC (12)**	Washington
1975	**USC (13)**	UCLA
1976	Washington (1) – North **USC (14)** – South	–
1977	Washington (2) – North **USC (15)** – South	–
1978	Washington (3) – North USC (16) – South	–
1979	USC (17)	UCLA
1980	**California (1)**	UCLA
1981	California (2)	UCLA
1982	Stanford (1)	**UCLA**
1983	Stanford (2)	California
1984	Stanford (3)	California
1985	**Stanford (4)**	California
1986	**Stanford (5)**	UCLA
1987	**Stanford (6)**	California
1988	Stanford (7)	USC
1989	Stanford (8)	UCLA
1990	Stanford (9)	UCLA
1991	Stanford (10)	UCLA
1992	**Stanford (11)**	California
1993	**Stanford (12)**	UCLA
1994	**Stanford (13)**	UCLA
1995	Stanford (14)	Arizona State
1996	Stanford (15)	Arizona
1997	Stanford (16)	USC
1998	**Stanford (17)**	USC
1999	Stanford (18)	California
2000	Stanford (19)	California
2001	Stanford (20)	USC
2002	Stanford (21)	California
2003	Stanford (22)	California
2004	Stanford (23)	California
2005	Stanford (24)	California
2006	Stanford (25)	California
2007	Stanford (26)	California
2008	Stanford (27)	California
2009	Stanford (28)	California
2010	Stanford (29)	California
2011	Stanford (30)	**California**
2012	Stanford (31)	**California**
2013	California (3)	Stanford
2014	**California (4)**	Stanford
2015	USC (18)	Stanford
2016	Stanford (32)	USC
2017	Stanford (33)	California
2018	California (5)	Stanford
2019	**California (6)**	Stanford
2020	California (7)	Arizona
2021	California (8)	Stanford
2022	**California (9)**	Stanford
2023	Arizona State (1)	**California**
2024	**Arizona State (2)**	Stanford

Bold text denotes National Champion.
Note: Arizona won the 2008 National Title. California won the 1979 National Title.

== Women's swim & dive ==
Season	Team Champion (#)	Runner up
1987	Stanford (1)	USC
1988	Stanford (2)	California
1989	**Stanford (3)**	California
1990	Stanford (4)	California
1991	Stanford (5)	California
1992	**Stanford (6)**	UCLA
1993	**Stanford (7)**	UCLA
1994	**Stanford (8)**	Arizona State
1995	**Stanford (9)**	UCLA
1996	**Stanford (10)**	UCLA
1997	Stanford (11)	**USC**
1998	**Stanford (12)**	USC
1999	Stanford (13)	USC
2000	Arizona (1)	Stanford
2001	UCLA (1)	Arizona
2002	Stanford (14)	USC
2003	UCLA (2)	Stanford
2004	Stanford (15)	UCLA
2005	Stanford (16)	Arizona
2006	Arizona (2)	UCLA
2007	Arizona (3)	Stanford
2008	**Arizona (4)**	Stanford
2009	**California (1)**	Arizona
2010	Stanford (17)	California
2011	Stanford (18)	**California**
2012	**California (2)**	Stanford
2013	Stanford (19)	USC
2014	California (3)	Stanford
2015	**California (4)**	Stanford
2016	USC (1)	Stanford
2017	**Stanford (20)**	California
2018	**Stanford (21)**	California
2019	**Stanford (22)**	California
2020	Stanford (23)	California
2021	California (5)	Stanford
2022	Stanford (24)	California
2023	Stanford (25)	USC
2024	California (6)	USC

Bold text denotes National Champion.

== Men's tennis ==
Season	Team Champion (#)	Conference	Overall	Tournament champion	Individual Champion	Doubles Champion
		W–L–T	W–L–T			
1928	Stanford (1)		8–0			
1929	Stanford (2)		10–1			
1930	California (1)	3–0–1	12–2–1			
1931	Stanford (3)		6–0			
1932	UCLA (1)					
1933	California (2) Stanford (4)	4–0 6–0	9–2 6–1			
1934	USC (1)	6–0	10–0			
1935	Stanford (5)		9–1			
1936	USC (2)	5–1	7–1			
1937	California (3)	5–1	7–1			
1938	Washington (1) – North USC (3) – South	0–0 6–0	5–0 8–0			
1939	Washington (2) – North California (4) – South	0–0 6–0	4–0 8–0			
1940	Washington (3) – North USC (4) – South	0–0 6–0	6–0 6–0			
1941	Washington (4) – North USC (5) – South	0–0 8–0	5–0 7–0			
1942	Washington (5) – North Stanford (6) – South	0–0 0–0	4–0 6–0			
1943	Washington (6) – North USC (6) – South	0–0 4–0	3–0 9–0			
1944	USC (7)	3–0	7–0			
1945	UCLA (2)	0–0	0–0			
1946	Washington (7) – North **USC (8)** – South	0–0 6–0	4–0 11–0			
1947	Washington (8) – North UCLA (3) & USC (9) – South	0–0 5–1 5–1	4–0 0–0 13–1			
1948	Washington (9) – North UCLA (4) & USC (10) – South	0–0 5–1 5–1	4–0 0–0 10–2			
1949	Washington (10) – North UCLA (5) & USC (11) – South	0–0 5–1 5–1	4–0 0–0 10–3			
1950	Washington (11) – North USC (12) – South	0–0 6–0	3–0 11–0			
1951	Washington (12) – North UCLA (6) – South	0–0 0–0	5–0 16–1			
1952	Washington (13) – North California (5) & **UCLA (7)** – South	0–0 5–1 5–1	5–1 11–2 9–2			
1953	Washington (14) – North California (6) & UCLA (8) – South	0–0 6–0 6–0	6–0 13–1 0–0			
1954	Washington (15) – North **UCLA (9)** – South	0–0 6–0	5–1 19–0			
1955	Washington (16) – North **USC (13)** – South	0–0 6–0	4–1 9–0			
1956	Washington (17) – North **UCLA (10)** – South	0–0 0–0	4–0 14–1			
1957	Washington (18) – North UCLA (11) & USC (14) – South	0–0 5–1 5–1	4–0 9–2 7–1			
1958	UCLA (12)	0–0	7–0			
1959	UCLA (13)	0–0	15–1			
1960	**UCLA (14)**	0–0	14–3			
1961	**UCLA (15)**	6–0	13–0			
1962	**USC (15)**	6–0	12–0			
1963	**USC (16)**	5–0	12–0			
1964	**USC (17)**	5–1	10–1			
1965	**UCLA (16)**	6–0	12–0			
1966	**USC (18)**	6–0	17–0			
1967	**USC (19)**	5–1	15–2			
1968	**USC (20)**	5–1	15–1–1			
1969	UCLA (17)	0–0	18–1–1			
1970	**UCLA (18)**		19–1			
1971	**UCLA (19)**	6–0	17–0			
1972	Stanford (7)		16–1			
1973	UCLA (20)		24–1			
1974	**Stanford (8)**		17–1			
1975	**UCLA (21)**	6–0	19–0			
1976	Washington (19) – North **UCLA (22)** – South	0–0 0–0	9–5 17–1			
1977	Washington (20) – North UCLA (23) – South	0–0 0–0	13–2 19–2			
1978	Washington (21) – North **Stanford (9)** – South	0–0 0–0	13–4 24–0			
1979	Washington (22) – North Stanford (10) – South	0–0 0–0	30–4 19–4			
1980	Washington (23) – North **Stanford (11)** & USC (21) – South	0–0 8–2 8–2	11–4 21–3 27–7			
1981	Washington (24) – North UCLA (24) – South	0–0 9–1	20–12 24–3			
1982	Washington (25) – North **UCLA (25)** – South	0–0 10–0	21–6 30–3			
1983	Washington (26) – North **Stanford (12)** – South	0–0 0–0	19–5 24–1			
1984	Washington (27) – North USC (22) – South	0–0 9–1	14–11 32–4			
1985	Washington (28) – North UCLA (26) – South	0–0 9–1	20–8 31–4			
1986	Washington (29) – North UCLA (27) – South	0–0 10–0	26–7 29–2			
1987	Washington (30) – North USC (23) – South	0–0 9–0	18–12 32–1		Patrick McEnroe, Stanford	Brian Garrow/Pat Galbraith, UCLA
1988	Washington (31) – North Stanford (13) – South	0–0 0–0	16–8 0–0		Brian Garrow, UCLA	Scott Melville/Eric Amend, USC
1989	Washington (32) – North UCLA (28) – South	0–0 9–1	9–17 26–4		Pat Galbraith, UCLA	Mark Quinney/Billy Barber, UCLA
1990	Washington (33) – North UCLA (29) – South	0–0 8–1	12–11 27–4		Jason Netter, UCLA	Alex O'Brien/Jason Yee, Stanford
1991	Washington (34) – North **USC (24)** – South	0–0 9–1	9–16 30–2		Alex O'Brien (1), Stanford	Jonathan Stark/Jared Palmer, Stanford
1992	Washington (35) – North USC (25) – South	0–0 9–1	6–9 21–3		Alex O'Brien (2), Stanford	Chris Cocotos/Alex O'Brien (2), Stanford
1993	Washington (36) – North **USC (26)** – South	0–0 9–1	13–8 22–2		Fritz Bissell, UCLA	David Ekerot/Andras Lanyi, USC
1994	Washington (37) – North **USC (27)** – South	0–0 9–1	10–13 22–3		Wayne Black, USC	Wayne Black/Jon Leach, USC
1995	Washington (38) – North **Stanford (14)** – South	0–0 10–0	12–11 27–0		Scott Humphries, Stanford	Brett Hansen/Fernando Samayoa, USC
1996	Washington (39) – North UCLA (30) – South	0–0 10–0	16–8 27–1		Adam Peterson, USC	Paul Goldstein/Jim Thomas, Stanford
1997	Washington (40) – North **Stanford (15)** – South	0–0 0–0	16–8 26–2		Bob Bryan, Stanford	Paul Goldstein (2)/Ryan Wolters, Stanford
1998	**Stanford (16)**	10–0	28–0		Paul Goldstein, Stanford	Bob Bryan/Mike Bryan, Stanford
1999	Stanford (17) UCLA (31)	6–1 6–1	20–3 26–3		Ryan Wolters, Stanford	Jean–Noel Grinda/Lee Jong–min, UCLA
2000	**Stanford (18)**	7–0	28–1		Geoff Abrams, Stanford	Brandon Kramer/Jong–Min Lee (2), UCLA
2001	Stanford (19)	7–0	24–2		Ryan Moore, USC	K.J. Hippensteel/Alex Kim, Stanford
2002	UCLA (32)	6–1	23–5		Rodrigo Grilli, UCLA	Marcin Matkowski/Jean–Julien Rojer, UCLA
2003	Stanford (20)	7–0	25–4		Marcin Matkowski, UCLA	Parker Collins/Daniel Langre, USC
2004	UCLA (33) USC (28)	6–1 6–1	26–6 23–4		Sam Warburg (1), Stanford	Phillip Gruendler/Luben Pampoulov, UCLA
2005	UCLA (34) Washington (41)	6–1 6–1	27–3 20–5		Sam Warburg (2), Stanford	KC Corkery/Sam Warburg, Stanford
2006	Stanford (21) UCLA (35)	6–1 6–1	18–4 20–6		Matt Bruch (1), Stanford	Mathieu Dehaine/Jeremy Drean, UCLA
2007	UCLA (36)	7–0	22–4		Matt Bruch (2), Stanford	Matt Bruch/Blake Muller, Stanford
2008	USC (29)	6–1	22–5		Kaes Van't Hof, USC	Robert Farah (1)/Kaes Van't Hof, USC
2009	UCLA (37)	6–0	21–5		Bradley Klahn, Stanford	Bradley Klahn/Ryan Thacher, Stanford
2010	Stanford (22) **USC (30)**	5–1 5–1	0–0 25–3		Robert Farah, USC	Robert Farah (2)/SteveJohnson (1), USC
2011	**USC (31)**	6–0	27–2		Steve Johnson, USC	SteveJohnson (2)/Ray Sarmiento, USC
2012	UCLA (38)	7–0	26–4	**USC (1)**		
2013	UCLA (39)	7–0	29–2	UCLA (1)		
2014	**USC (32)**	7–0	32–3	UCLA (2)		
2015	Stanford (23) USC (33)	6–1 6–1	17–6 22–4	USC (2)		
2016	UCLA (40)	7–0	20–2	UCLA (3)		
2017	UCLA (41)	6–0	21–5	USC (3)		
2018	UCLA (42)	8–0	30–3	UCLA (4)		
2019	UCLA (43)	8–0	19–6	USC (4)		
2020	–	–		–		
2021	Stanford (24)	6–1	11–6	USC (5)		
2022	Arizona (1)	7–0	20–5	USC (6)		
2023	Arizona (2); USC (34); Utah (1)	6–2	20–5; 16–7; 21–4	USC (7)		
2024	Arizona (3); Stanford (25)	7–1	21–3; 15–5	Arizona (1)		

Bold text denotes National Champion.
Note: The 2020 Season was stopped due to the COVID–19 Pandemic.
Note: Stanford won the 1973, 1977, 1981, 1986, 1988, 1989, 1990, 1992, 1996 Team National Title. UCLA won the 1950, 1953, 1979, 1984, 2008 Team National Titles. USC won the 1976 Team National Title.
Note: The 2008 UCLA Conference Championship was vacated due to playing an ineligible player & awarded to USC.

== Women's tennis ==
Season	Team Champion (#)	Conference	Overall	Tournament champion	Individual Champion	Doubles Champion
		W–L–T	W–L–T			
1987	Washington (1) – North California (1) – South	0–0 0–0	0–0 0–0		Jane Thomas, UCLA	Lupita Novelo/Ginny Purdy, USC
1988	Washington (2) – North **Stanford (1)** – South	0–0 0–0	0–0 27–2		Lisa Green, Stanford	Alissa Finerman/Tifany Silveria, California
1989	Washington (3) – North **Stanford (2)** – South	0–0 6–0	0–0 29–0		Sandra Birch (1), Stanford	Mamie Ceniza/Stella Sampras (1), UCLA
1990	Washington (4) – North **Stanford (3)** – South	0–0 6–0	0–0 29–0		Debra Graham, Stanford	Meredith McGrath/Teri Whitlinger, Stanford
1991	Washington (5) – North **Stanford (4)** – South	0–0 6–0	0–0 26–1		Sandra Birch (2), Stanford	Kimberly Po/Stella Sampras (2), UCLA
1992	Washington (6) – North Stanford (5) – South	0–0 0–0	0–0 22–3		Alix Creek (1), Arizona	Alix Creek/Danielle Scott, Arizona
1993	Washington (7) – North Stanford (6) – South	0–0 0–0	0–0 26–3		Alix Creek (2), Arizona	Keirsten Alley (1)/Pam Nelson (1), California
1994	Washington (8) – North Stanford (7) – South	0–0 0–0	0–0 23–3		Sandra DeSilva, Stanford	Keirsten Alley (2)/Pam Nelson (2), California
1995	Washington State (1) – North Stanford (8) – South	0–0 0–0	0–0 23–3		Keri Phebus, UCLA	Ania Bleszynski/Katie Schlukebir, Stanford
1996	Washington State (2) – North Stanford (9) – South	0–0 0–0	0–0 25–2		Julie Scott (1), Stanford	Keri Phebus/Paige Yaroshuk, UCLA
1997	Washington (9) – North **Stanford (10)** – South	0–0 0–0	0–0 30–1		Julie Scott (2), Stanford	Amanda Augustus/Claire Curran, California
1998	Stanford (11)	0–0	26–2		Annica Cooper, UCLA	Ania Bleszynski/Julie Scott, Stanford
1999	**Stanford (12)**	0–0	29–2		Mariss Irvin, Stanford	Teryn Ashley/Marissa Irvin, Stanford
2000	Stanford (13)	0–0	30–1		Sara Walker, UCLA	Lindsay Blau/Michelle Gough, Arizona
2001	**Stanford (14)**	0–0	30–0		Adria Engel, Arizona State	Mariko Fritz–Krockow/Sara Walker, UCLA
2002	**Stanford (15)**	0–0	27–1		Gabriela Lastra, Stanford	Christina Fusano (1)/Raquel Kops–Jones (1), California
2003	Stanford (16)	0–0	25–2		Daria Panova, Oregon	Christina Fusano (2)/Raquel Kops–Jones (2), California
2004	**Stanford (17)**	0–0	29–0		Raquel Kops–Jones, California	Alice Barnes (1)/Erin Burdette, Stanford
2005	**Stanford (18)**	0–0	27–0		Nicole Leimbach, USC	Alice Barnes (2)/Anne Yelsey (1), Stanford
2006	**Stanford (19)**	0–0	30–0		Zsuzsanna Fodor, California	Alice Barnes (3)/Anne Yelsey (2), Stanford
2007	Stanford (20)	0–0	24–2		Lindsey Nelson, USC	Riza Zalameda/Yasmin Schnack (1), UCLA
2008	Stanford (21) **UCLA (1)**	0–0 0–0	22–5 0–0		Riza Zalameda, UCLA	Amanda Fink (1)/Gabriela Niculescu (1), USC
2009	USC (1)	0–0	0–0		Amanda Fink, USC	Amanda Fink (2)/Gabriela Niculescu (2), USC
2010	**Stanford (22)**	7–0	26–1		Yasmin Schnack, UCLA	Yasmin Schnack (2)/Andrea Remynse, UCLA
2011	Stanford (23)	8–0	28–1		Kristie Ahn, Stanford	Mari Andersson/Jana Juricova, California
2012	Stanford (24) UCLA (2)	9–1 9–1	21–2 0–0		Nicole Gibbs, Stanford	Kaitlyn Christian (1)/Sabrina Santamaria (1), USC
2013	USC (2)	0–0	0–0		Kyle McPhillips, UCLA	Kaitlyn Christian (2)/Sabrina Santamaria (3), USC
2014	California (2)	0–0	0–0		Jennifer Brady, UCLA	Kaitlyn Christian (3)/Giuliana Olmos, USC
2015	USC (3)	0–0	0–0		Catherine Harrison, UCLA	Carol Zhao/Taylor Davidson, Stanford
2016	**Stanford (25)**	9–1	20–5		Maegan Manasse, California	Alexandra Osborne/Ebony Panoho, Arizona State
2017	Stanford (26)	10–0	24–3	Stanford (1)		
2018	**Stanford (27)**	9–0	24–3	Stanford (2)		
2019	**Stanford (28)**	10–0	28–1	Stanford (3)		
2020	–	–	–	–		
2021	UCLA (3)	10–0	22–4	California (1)		
2022	California (3)	8–1	15–6	Stanford (4)		
2023	Stanford (29)	10–0	18–2	Stanford (5)		
2024	UCLA (4)	9–1	17–4	Stanford (6)		

Bold text denotes National Champion.
Note: The 2020 Season was stopped due to the COVID–19 Pandemic.
Note: Stanford won the 1982, 1984, 1986, 1987, 2013 Team National Titles. UCLA won the 2014 Team National Title. USC won the 1983, 1985 Team National Titles

== Men's track & field ==
Season	Team Champion (#)	Runner up
1960	USC (1)	UCLA
1961	**USC (2)**	UCLA
1962	USC (3)	UCLA
1963	USC (4)	Stanford
1964	USC (5)	California
1965	Oregon (1)	Washington State
1966	**UCLA (1)**	USC
1967	Oregon (2)	**USC**
1968	**USC (6)**	Oregon
1969	UCLA (2)	Oregon
1970	UCLA (3)	**Oregon**
1971	**UCLA (4)**	Oregon
1972	USC (7)	**UCLA**
1973	**UCLA (3)**	USC
1974	USC (8)	UCLA
1975	USC (9)	UCLA
1976	**USC (10)**	Washington
1977	USC (11)	Washington State
1978	USC (12)	Oregon
1979	Oregon (3)	UCLA
1980	UCLA (4)	Oregon
1981	Arizona State (1)	Oregon
1982	UCLA (5)	Washington State
1983	Washington State (1)	Arizona State & UCLA
1984	Washington State (2)	**Oregon**
1985	Washington State (3)	California
1986	Oregon (4)	UCLA
1987	**UCLA (6)**	Oregon
1988	**UCLA (7)**	Washington State
1989	UCLA (8)	Oregon
1990	Oregon (5)	Washington State
1991	Washington State (4)	Oregon
1992	UCLA (9)	Oregon
1993	UCLA (10)	Arizona
1994	UCLA (11)	USC
1995	UCLA (12)	Oregon
1996	UCLA (13)	Oregon
1997	USC (13)	UCLA
1998	UCLA (14)	USC
1999	USC (13)	UCLA
2000	USC (14)	**Stanford**
2001	Stanford (1)	USC
2002	Stanford (2)	Oregon
2003	Oregon (6)	Stanford
2004	UCLA (15)	Oregon
2005	Oregon (7)	UCLA
2006	USC (15)	Oregon
2007	Oregon (8)	Arizona State
2008	Oregon (9)	Arizona State
2009	Oregon (10)	USC
2010	Oregon (11)	USC
2011	Oregon (12)	Arizona
2012	Oregon (13)	Arizona State
2013	Oregon (14)	USC
2014	**Oregon (15)**	USC
2015	**Oregon (16)**	USC
2016	Oregon (17)	Washington
2017	Oregon (18)	USC
2018	Oregon (19)	Stanford
2019	Oregon (20)	UCLA
2020	—	—
2021	Oregon (21)	USC
2022	Oregon (22)	Washington
2023	Washington (1)	USC
2024	Washington (2)	USC

Bold text denotes National Champion.
Note: Arizona State won the 1977 National Title. Oregon won the 1962 & 1964 National Title. UCLA won the 1978 National Title. USC won the 1965 National Title.

Note: The 2020 Season was stopped due to the COVID–19 Pandemic.

== Women's track & field ==
Season	Team Champion (#)	Runner up
1987	UCLA (1)	USC
1988	UCLA (2)	Oregon
1989	UCLA (3)	Oregon
1990	UCLA (4)	Oregon
1991	Oregon (1)	UCLA
1992	Oregon (2)	Arizona
1993	UCLA (5)	Oregon
1994	UCLA (6)	Arizona State
1995	UCLA (7)	Oregon
1996	USC (1)	Oregon
1997	UCLA (8)	USC
1998	UCLA (9)	Stanford
1999	UCLA (10)	USC
2000	UCLA (11)	USC
2001	UCLA (12)	**USC**
2002	UCLA (13)	USC
2003	UCLA (14)	Stanford
2004	**UCLA (15)**	Stanford
2005	Stanford (1)	UCLA
2006	Arizona State (1)	Stanford
2007	**Arizona State (2)**	Stanford
2008	Arizona State (3)	Stanford
2009	Oregon (3)	Stanford
2010	Oregon (4)	Arizona
2011	Oregon (5)	Arizona
2012	Oregon (6)	Stanford
2013	Oregon (7)	Arizona
2014	Oregon (8)	USC
2015	**Oregon (9)**	USC
2016	Oregon (10)	USC
2017	**Oregon (11)**	USC
2018	**USC (2)**	Oregon
2019	USC (3)	Oregon
2020	—	—
2021	**USC (3)**	Oregon
2022	Oregon (12)	Colorado
2023	Oregon (13)	USC
2024	Oregon (14)	USC

Bold text denotes National Champion.

Note: The 2020 Season was stopped due to the COVID–19 Pandemic.

== Women's indoor volleyball ==
Year	Team	Conf			Overall			Runner–up
Year	Team	W	L	Pct	W	L	Pct	Runner–up
1986	UCLA	17	1	0.944	31	10	0.756	Stanford
1987	Stanford	17	1	0.944	29	7	0.806	UCLA
1988	UCLA	18	0	1.000	34	1	0.971	Stanford
1989	UCLA	18	0	1.000	30	3	0.909	Washington; Stanford
1990	**UCLA**	18	0	1.000	36	1	0.973	Stanford
1991	Stanford	18	0	1.000	30	2	0.938	**UCLA**
1992	UCLA	18	0	1.000	33	1	0.971	**Stanford**
1993	UCLA	17	1	0.944	30	2	0.938	Stanford; ASU
1994	**Stanford**	17	1	0.944	32	1	0.970	UCLA
1995	Stanford	18	0	1.000	29	3	0.906	WSU; UCLA
1996	**Stanford**	17	1	0.944	31	2	0.935	WSU
1997	**Stanford**	18	0	1.000	33	2	0.942	USC; Washington
1998	Stanford	17	1	0.944	27	4	0.871	USC
1999	Stanford; UCLA	17	1	0.944	31; 28	3; 4	0.912; 0.875	N/A
2000	USC; Arizona	16	2	0.889	29; 28	3; 5	0.906; 0.848	N/A
2001	**Stanford**	17	1	0.944	33	2	0.943	USC
2002	**USC**	17	1	0.944	31	1	0.969	Stanford
2003	**USC**	18	0	1.000	35	0	1.000	Stanford
2004	Washington	16	2	0.889	28	3	0.903	**Stanford**
2005	**Washington**	17	1	0.944	32	1	0.903	Stanford; Arizona
2006	Stanford	16	2	0.889	30	4	0.882	UCLA; Washington
2007	Stanford	16	2	0.889	32	3	0.914	Washington
2008	Stanford	17	1	0.944	31	4	0.886	Washington
2009	Stanford	14	4	0.778	23	8	0.742	Washington; UCLA
2010	California; Stanford	15	3	0.833	30; 27	4; 4	0.882; 0.871	N/A
2011	USC	20	2	0.909	29	5	0.853	**UCLA**
2012	Stanford	19	1	0.950	30	4	0.882	Oregon
2013	Washington	18	2	0.900	30	3	0.909	Stanford
2014	Stanford	19	1	0.950	33	1	0.971	Washington
2015	USC; Washington	18	2	0.900	33; 31	3; 3	0.917; 0.912	N/A
2016	Washington	16	4	0.800	29	5	0.853	**Stanford**
2017	Stanford	19	1	0.950	30	4	0.882	Washington
2018	**Stanford**	20	0	1.000	34	1	0.971	California
2019	**Stanford**	18	2	.900	30	4	0.82	Washington
2020	Washington	17	3	.850	20	4	0.833	Oregon
2021	Washington	17	3	.850	26	5	0.839	UCLA
2022	Stanford	19	1	0.950	27	5	0.843	Oregon
2023	Stanford	19	1	0.950	26	3	0.8979	Oregon

Bold text indicates National Champion

== Men's wrestling ==
Year	Team	Conference Membership
1963	Washington State	Full Member
1964	UCLA	Full Member
1965	Oregon State	Full Member
1966	Oregon State	Full Member
1967	Oregon State	Full Member
1968	Oregon State	Full Member
1969	Oregon State	Full Member
1970	Oregon State	Full Member
1971	Washington	Full Member
1972	Washington; Oregon State	Full Member; Full Member
1973	Oregon State	Full Member
1974	Washington	Full Member
1975	Oregon	Full Member
1976	Oregon State	Full Member
1977	Oregon State	Full Member
1978	Oregon State	Full Member
1979	Oregon State	Full Member
1980	Arizona State	Full Member
1981	Oregon	Full Member
1982	Oregon	Full Member
1983	Oregon State	Full Member
1984	Oregon State	Full Member
1985	Arizona State	Full Member
1986	Arizona State	Full Member
1987	Arizona State	Full Member
1988	**Arizona State**	Full Member
1989	Arizona State	Full Member
1990	Arizona State	Full Member
1991	Arizona State	Full Member
1992	Oregon State	Full Member
1993	Arizona State	Full Member
1994	Oregon State	Full Member
1995	Arizona State	Full Member
1996	Cal State Bakersfield	Affiliate
1997	Arizona State	Full Member
1998	Arizona State	Full Member
1999	Boise State	Affiliate
2000	Boise State	Affiliate
2001	Arizona State	Full Member
2002	Boise State	Affiliate
2003	Arizona State	Full Member
2004	Boise State	Affiliate
2005	Arizona State	Full Member
2006	Arizona State	Full Member
2007	Oregon State	Full Member
2008	Boise State	Affiliate
2009	Boise State	Affiliate
2010	Oregon State	Full Member
2011	Boise State	Affiliate
2012	Oregon State	Full Member
2013	Oregon State	Full Member
2014	Oregon State	Full Member
2015	Oregon State	Full Member
2016	Oregon State	Full Member
2017	Arizona State	Full Member
2018	Arizona State	Full Member
2019	Stanford	Full Member
2020	Arizona State	Full Member
2021	Arizona State	Full Member
2022	Arizona State	Full Member
2023	Oregon State	Full Member
2024	Arizona State	Full Member
2025	Little Rock	Affiliate

Bold text indicates National Champion
