= Shania Adams =

American artistic gymnast (born 2001)

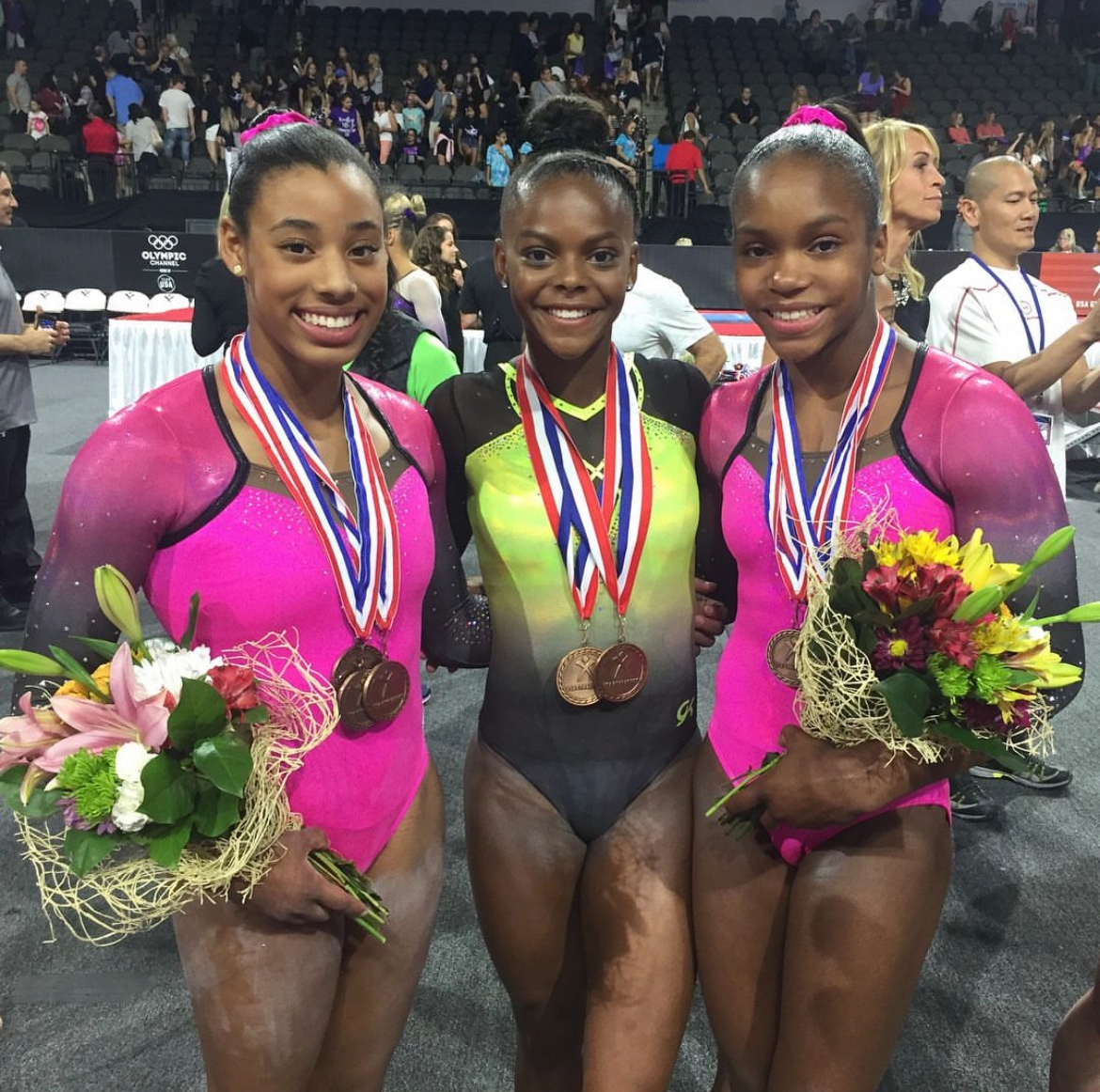
- Shania (left) post competition 2017 U.S. Classic

Personal information
- Full name: Shania Patricia Adams
- Born: October 20, 2001 (age 24) Columbus, Ohio, U.S.

Gymnastics career
- Discipline: Women's artistic gymnastics
- Country represented: United States; (2016)
- College team: Alabama Crimson Tide
- Club: Buckeye Gymnastics
- Head coach: Kittia Carpenter
- Retired: 2025

Shania Patricia Adams (born October 20, 2001) is an American former artistic gymnast. She competed as an elite gymnast for the United States and was a member of the U.S. national team in 2016. Adams later competed for the University of Alabama women's gymnastics team from 2021 to 2025, where she won the 2021 Southeastern Conference (SEC) uneven bars title and was part of Alabama's 2021 SEC championship team.

== Early life and training ==
Adams was born in Columbus, Ohio, and raised in Dublin, Ohio, later moving to Plain City, Ohio. She began gymnastics around 2008, at age six, after her mother enrolled her in a recreational tumbling class, and coaches soon identified her as an elite prospect. She first competed at level 6 around age eight and joined Buckeye's elite program at age ten; she was home-schooled from the fourth grade to accommodate a training schedule of around eight hours a day. Adams trained at Buckeye Gymnastics in Westerville under Kittia Carpenter and Christian Gallardo, the same club where Olympic champion Gabby Douglas trained during her 2016 comeback, and where Adams was a teammate of Douglas, Nia Dennis, and future Alabama gymnast Makarri Doggette.

== Elite career ==
Adams progressed through the USA Gymnastics elite program, competing at events including the American Classic, U.S. Classic, and U.S. Championships, and was a five-time qualifier to the national championships. She was a member of the U.S. junior national team in 2016, when she was profiled at age 14 as one of the gymnasts training alongside Gabby Douglas at Buckeye.

Adams was promoted to the senior elite level in 2017, finishing 11th in the all-around at that year's U.S. Championships. Among her elite results, Adams finished second in the all-around at the 2018 American Classic—qualifying her for the U.S. Championships—and placed eighth on the uneven bars at the 2018 U.S. Championships. In 2019, she won the uneven bars title and placed third in the all-around at the American Classic. Ahead of the 2018 U.S. Championships, the Columbus Dispatch covered Adams and fellow central Ohio gymnast Shilese Jones as both sought a place on the national team.

== Collegiate career ==
In April 2020, Adams signed a National Letter of Intent to compete for the University of Alabama, joining the program for the 2021 season.

As a freshman in 2021, Adams won the SEC uneven bars title with a score of 9.95 and helped Alabama win the SEC championship. She was named to the SEC All-Freshman Team and earned All-SEC honors that season, and was also recognized as SEC Freshman of the Week. She received All-SEC honors again in 2022.

Over her career, Adams competed primarily on the uneven bars and balance beam, and at times on vault and floor exercise. Her career-best scores were 9.975 on the uneven bars (set at the 2023 NCAA Tuscaloosa Regional), 9.950 on vault, 9.950 on balance beam, and 9.925 on floor exercise. She was named SEC Specialist of the Week in 2024. She was among the nominees for the AAI Award—an annual honor presented to the nation's top senior collegiate female gymnast—in both 2024 and 2025; the award's field includes roughly 50 to 60 nominees each year. Adams returned for a fifth year in 2025, having helped Alabama reach the 2024 NCAA Championship semifinals.

== Education and academics ==
Adams was a Scholastic All-American and a four-time SEC Academic Honor Roll selection (2021–2024) during her time at Alabama.

== Honors ==
=== Elite ===
- U.S. national team member (2016)
- Second place, all-around, 2018 American Classic
- Uneven bars champion and third place, all-around, 2019 American Classic

=== Collegiate ===
- SEC uneven bars champion (2021)
- SEC team champion (2021)
- All-SEC (2021, 2022)
- SEC All-Freshman Team (2021)
- AAI Award nominee (2024, 2025)

=== Academic ===
- Scholastic All-American
- Four-time SEC Academic Honor Roll (2021–2024)
