= Bucket-handle =

Bucket-handle may refer to:

- Bail handle
- Bucket handle movement, a movement of ribs
- Bucket-handle fracture, a child bone fracture
- B-J-K continuum, an Indecomposable continuum
- Bucket handle tear, tear in the meniscus of the knee, often caused by the sudden twisting of the knee
