= Douglas Family Gold =

2016 American reality TV series

- Genre: Reality television
- Starring: Gabby Douglas; Natalie Hawkins; Arielle Hawkins
- Country of origin: United States
- Original language: English
- No. of seasons: 1
- No. of episodes: 6

Production
- Executive producers: Wilmer Valderrama; Jessica Acevedo; Gabby Douglas; Natalie Hawkins
- Production companies: WV Enterprises; Lionsgate Television

Original release
- Network: Oxygen
- Release: May 25 – June 29, 2016

Douglas Family Gold is a reality television series for Oxygen. The show, which follows the life of 2012 Olympic all-around gymnastics champion Gabby Douglas and her family, premiered on May 25, 2016.

== Development ==
In March 2015, plans were released about the idea of the show; production and release dates were unclear though. However, on March 8, 2016 – following her win at the 2016 AT&T American Cup – it was revealed the show was set to broadcast on Wednesday, May 25, 2016, at 10/9c.

Rod Aissa, Executive Vice President of Programming at Oxygen, described the show's premise as "The series provides an inside look at an inspirational family who doesn’t let any obstacles stand in their way, and when dreams are on the line 'Team Douglas' comes together and outshines the competition".

== Cast ==
- Gabby Douglas
- Natalie Hawkins
- Arielle Hawkins
- Joyelle Douglas
- Johnathan Douglas
- Carolyn Ford

== Episodes ==
No.	Title	Original release date	Prod. code
1	"The First Hurdle"	May 25, 2016	101
Gabby is on a journey to defend her title at the 2016 Olympics in Rio. Her close-knit family is her support team as she tries to conquer what no American gymnast has ever accomplished. The first hurdle is to make the national team.
2	"Graduation Day"	June 1, 2016	102
This home-schooled elite gymnast heads to LA for her high school graduation day, but the trip does not go as planned. Also, Gabby made the national team so training intensifies to prep for the next step, making the world team.
3	"A Companion for Gabby"	June 8, 2016	103
Arie and Joy talk about starting their own business while prepping for a trip to Ohio for a much-needed girls' weekend with Gabby. Gabby has no time to date, so the sisters hatch a plan to get her a different kind of companion.
4	"Last Days of Summer"	June 15, 2016	104
Gabby’s on the journey to Rio, but before she leaves for the grueling selection camp, her family travels to Ohio with a plan to give Gabby some much needed fun and relaxation. Arie takes steps toward a career in fashion.
5	"World Selection Camp"	June 22, 2016	105
The family preps to send Gabby off to camp to compete for a spot on the world team. Arie secretly interviews for a job. Gabby vies for a coveted world team spot at the ranch in Texas, and her family anxiously awaits the news in LA.
6	"The World Championships in Scotland"	June 29, 2016	106
One step closer to Rio, Gabby must face fierce competitors in the finals round in Scotland. Emotions arise outside the arena as Gabby's family struggles to adjust to the next phase of Douglas family life.
