= Christian Gallardo =

American gymnastics coach

- Born: El Paso, Texas
- Occupation: Business Owner/Entrepreneur/Gymnastics Coach
- Employer: Future Gymnastics Academy
- Known for: Personal coach to Gabby Douglas

Christian Gallardo is an American gymnastics coach, most notably the personal coach of Gabby Douglas at Buckeye Gymnastics since 2014. He has also coached multiple other USA National Team Members including Nia Dennis, Shania Adams, and Shilese Jones.

He now co-owns and operates a gymnastics club - Future Gymnastics Academy.
