= Double posterior cruciate ligament sign =

Radiologic sign in knee injury

The double posterior cruciate ligament sign (or double PCL sign) is a radiological finding seen on magnetic resonance imaging of the knee, specifically in the context of a bucket-handle tear of the medial meniscus. It refers to the appearance of a duplicated posterior cruciate ligament, where the displaced fragment of the torn medial meniscus lies parallel and inferior to the PCL, mimicking a second ligament. The double PCL sign has high specificity for meniscal tears when noted on MRI.

== Pathophysiology ==
A bucket-handle tear is a specific type of longitudinal meniscal tear in which a fragment of the torn meniscus displaces toward the intercondylar notch of the knee. The displaced fragment often remains attached at its anterior and posterior horns but flips centrally into the notch. This displacement causes the torn meniscal fragment to align closely and parallel to the PCL, resulting in the appearance of a "double PCL" on sagittal MRI sequences.

== Imaging characteristics ==
The double PCL sign is best observed on sagittal T2-weighted or proton density-weighted MRI images. Key features include:

- Duplicated PCL Appearance: The native PCL appears as a curvilinear low-signal intensity structure in its typical anatomical location.The displaced meniscal fragment appears as a second parallel low-signal structure inferior to the PCL.
- Meniscal tear: Evidence of a longitudinal tear, often in the medial meniscus.
- Joint effusion: Joint effusion may be present, often associated with acute injury.
- Bone contusions: Sometimes seen in traumatic injuries causing bucket-handle tears.
