= Gabby Douglas =

American artistic gymnast (born 1995)

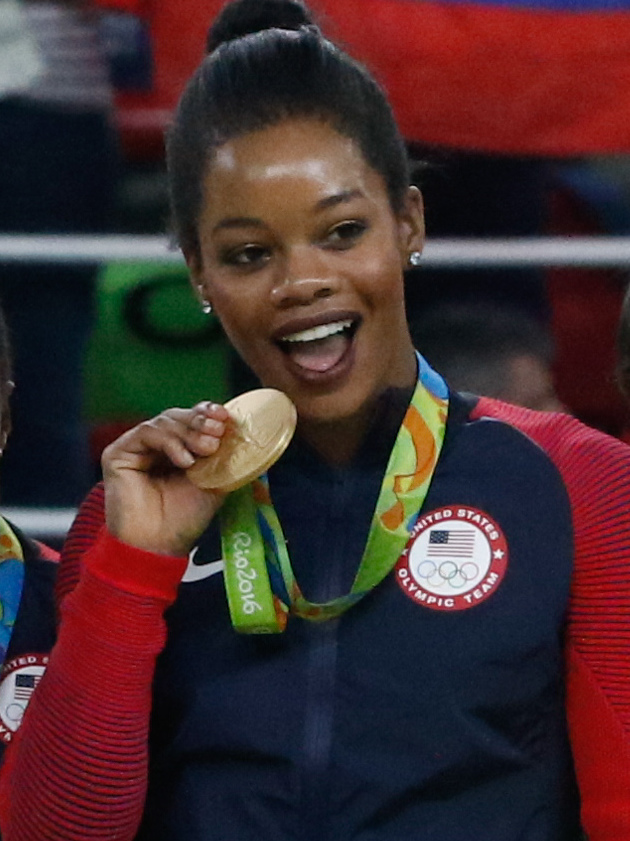
- Douglas at the 2016 Olympic Games

Personal information
- Full name: Gabrielle Christina Victoria Douglas
- Born: December 31, 1995 (age 30) Newport News, Virginia, U.S.
- Height: 5 ft 2.5 in (159 cm)

Gymnastics career
- Discipline: Women's artistic gymnastics
- Country represented: United States; (2008–2012, 2014–2016)
- Gym: WOGA; Buckeye Gymnastics; Chow's Gymnastics
- Former coaches: Liang Chow; Kittia Carpenter; Christian Gallardo; Valeri Liukin
Medal record
Women's artistic gymnastics
Representing United States
Olympic Games
| Gold medal – first place | 2012 London | Team |
| Gold medal – first place | 2012 London | All-around |
| Gold medal – first place | 2016 Rio de Janeiro | Team |
World Championships
| Gold medal – first place | 2011 Tokyo | Team |
| Gold medal – first place | 2015 Glasgow | Team |
| Silver medal – second place | 2015 Glasgow | All-around |
Pacific Rim Championships
| Gold medal – first place | 2012 Seattle | Team |
| Gold medal – first place | 2012 Seattle | Uneven bars |
Pan American Championships
| Gold medal – first place | 2010 Guadalajara | Team |
| Gold medal – first place | 2010 Guadalajara | Uneven bars |
FIG World Cup
Event / 1st / 2nd / 3rd; All-Around World Cup / 1 / 0 / 0

Gabrielle Christina Victoria Douglas (born December 31, 1995) is an American artistic gymnast. She is the 2012 Olympic all-around gold medalist and the 2015 World all-around silver medalist. She was a member of the gold-winning teams at both the 2012 and the 2016 Summer Olympics, dubbed the "Fierce Five" and the "Final Five" by the media, respectively. She was also a member of the gold-winning American teams at the 2011 and the 2015 World Championships. Additionally, she is the 2012 U.S. champion on the uneven bars and the 2016 American Cup all-around champion.

Douglas is the first African American to win an Olympic individual all-around title, and the first U.S. gymnast to win gold in both the individual all-around and team competitions at the same Olympic Games. With a total of six Olympic and World Championship medals, she is the 11th most decorated U.S. female gymnast of all time.

Douglas's gymnastics successes have led to her life story adaptation in the 2014 Lifetime biopic film, The Gabby Douglas Story, as well as her own reality television series, Douglas Family Gold. She is the author of two books: Grace, Gold, and Glory: My Leap of Faith and Raising the Bar. In 2021, she won the first season of The Masked Dancer.

== Early life ==
Douglas was born on December 31, 1995, to parents Timothy Douglas and Natalie Hawkins-Douglas, in Newport News, Virginia, and grew up in nearby Virginia Beach. She has two older sisters, Arielle and Joyelle, and one older brother, Johnathan. She began training in gymnastics at age six when Arielle convinced their mother to enroll Gabby in classes. Her first gym was Excalibur Gymnastics in Virginia Beach. At the age of eight, Douglas won the Level 4 all-around gymnastics title at the 2004 Virginia State Championships.

At 14, she moved to Des Moines, Iowa, to train full-time with coach Liang Chow. Because her family had to stay in Virginia while her siblings finished school, she lived with Travis and Missy Parton and their four daughters, one of whom also trained at Chow's gym. However, Douglas struggled to fit in because of the separation from her family and hometown.

Douglas was raised Christian, stating in a 2012 interview, "[My faith] always plays a big role in my life. I don't know where I'd be without it today." Douglas has also stated in her biography that when she was younger her "family practiced some of the Jewish traditions", including attending a Conservative Jewish synagogue, keeping kosher, and celebrating Hanukkah.

== Junior career ==
=== 2008–2009 ===
Douglas qualified for elite gymnastics, the highest competitive level in gymnastics in the U.S., in 2008. She made her elite debut at the U.S. Classic in Houston, Texas, where she tied for tenth place in the all-around rankings. She went on to compete at the 2008 U.S. Championships in Boston, Massachusetts, and finished 16th in the all-around. She was not selected for the 2008 junior U.S. national team.

In 2009, Douglas suffered a fracture in the growth plate of her wrist. Due to this injury, she was not able to compete at the 2009 U.S. Classic. She did compete at the 2009 U.S. Championships in Dallas, Texas, but she hurt her knee on a double Arabian on the floor exercise. She only competed on the balance beam on the second day of competition and finished fifth on that apparatus. She, once again, was not selected for the junior national team.

=== 2010 ===
Douglas competed at the 2010 Nastia Liukin Cup, a televised Level 10 meet held in Worcester, Massachusetts, where she placed fourth all-around. Her first elite meet of the year was the U.S. Classic in Chicago. She finished ninth in the all-around, but won a bronze medal on the balance beam behind Kyla Ross and Katelyn Ohashi. At the U.S. Championships, she finished fourth in the all-around competition after hitting her feet on the floor on a Pak salto on the uneven bars. She did win the silver medal on the balance beam behind Ross and was added to the junior national team for the first time. She was then selected to make her international debut at the 2010 Pan American Championships. She and teammates Ross, Sabrina Vega, McKayla Maroney, Brenna Dowell, and Sarah Finnegan won the team gold medal by nearly 20 points. The next day, she won a gold medal in the uneven bars final.

In October, at age 14, Douglas moved into the home of Missy Parton in West Des Moines, Iowa, to train under Liang Chow, the former coach of 2007 World Champion and 2008 Summer Olympics gold medalist Shawn Johnson. Prior to the move, Chow taught clinic at her club, and Douglas was impressed when Chow was able to teach her how to perform the Amanar vault in a single afternoon. Douglas considered a move to Texas to train with a renowned coach there, but after that coach declined to train her out of loyalty to Excalibur's coaches, Douglas selected Chow. Chow was initially skeptical, since Douglas had been just one of hundreds of children at the clinic in Virginia Beach; however, Chow subsequently informed Douglas's Excalibur coaches that he had agreed to train her, but pointed out that he did not recruit her, saying, "I would never recruit anybody to my program."

== Senior career ==
=== 2011 ===
Douglas became age-eligible for senior-level competitions in 2011 because of her birthdate: December 31, 1995. Had she been born on January 1, 1996, she would not have been senior-level eligible until 2012. She made her senior debut at the City of Jesolo Trophy and helped the American team win the gold medal. Additionally, she tied with Sabrina Vega for the bronze medal on the balance beam and also won a floor exercise bronze medal. She only competed on the uneven bars at the U.S. Classic and won the silver medal behind Jordyn Wieber. At the 2011 U.S. Championships in St. Paul, Minnesota, Douglas fell on the balance beam and floor exercise on the first day of competition. She fell on her balance beam dismount on the second day of competition and finished seventh in the all-around. She tied with Anna Li for the bronze medal on the uneven bars.

Douglas was selected to compete at the 2011 World Championships in Tokyo alongside Wieber, Vega, McKayla Maroney, Aly Raisman, and Alicia Sacramone. She competed on the uneven bars in the team final to help the team win the gold medal by over four points ahead of silver-medalists Russia. She qualified for the uneven bars final and tied with Asuka Teramoto for fifth place.

=== 2012 ===
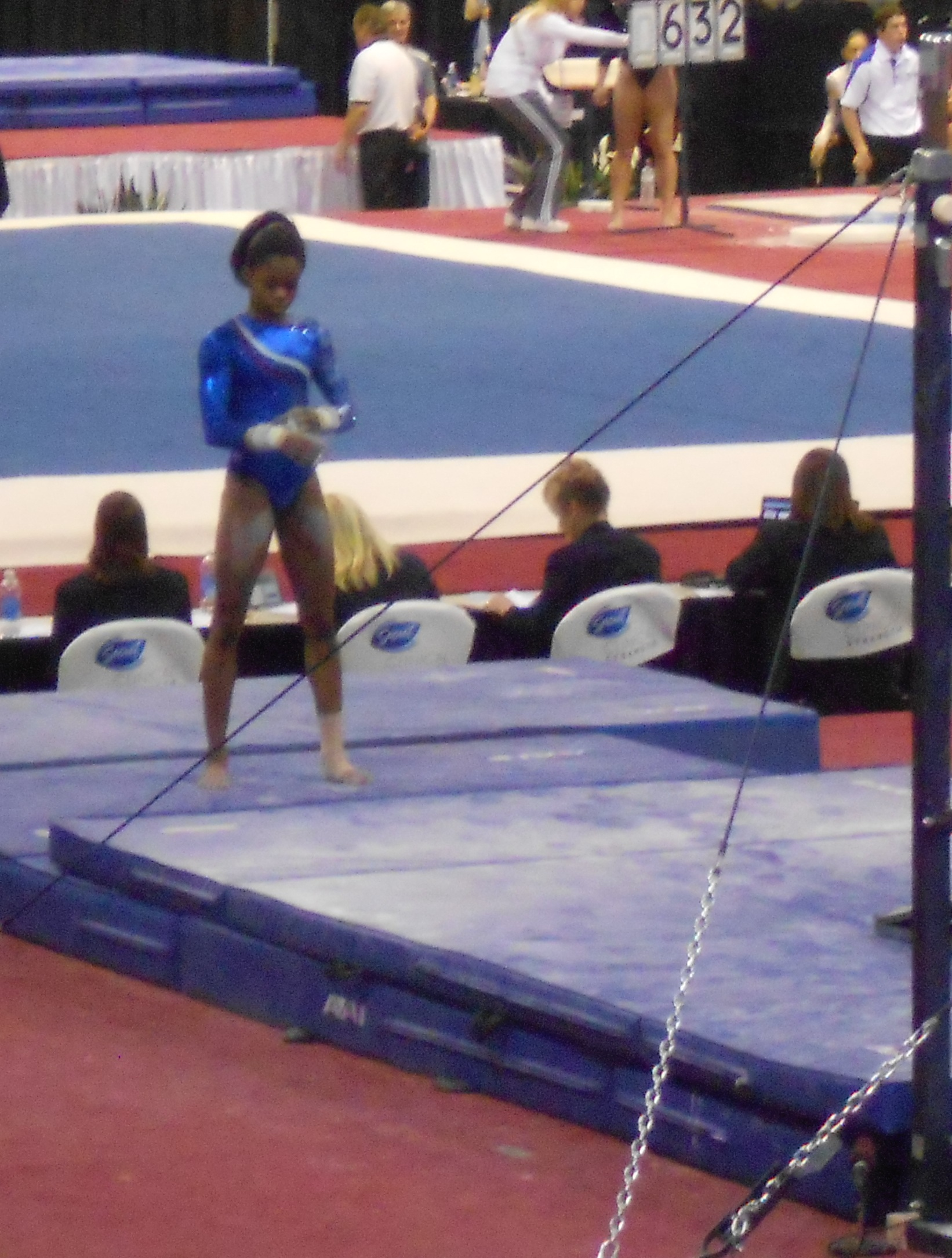
Douglas at the 2012 U.S. Classic

Douglas competed as a guest competitor at the American Cup held at Madison Square Garden. She had the highest total all-around score, but she was not eligible for the gold medal as a guest competitor. Later that month, she was part of the gold-winning U.S. team at the Pacific Rim Championships. During the competition, Douglas attempted the Amanar vault, but her hand slipped off the vaulting table, causing her to fall. She tweaked her ankle and withdrew from competing on the floor exercise. She still competed on the uneven bars and won the gold medal.

Douglas competed at the U.S. Classic and won the uneven bars title. She also finished seventh on the balance beam after grabbing the beam on her acrobatic series, and she won a bronze medal on the floor exercise. She did not compete on the vault due to continued struggles with the Amanar. At the 2012 U.S. Championships, she finished second to Jordyn Wieber in the all-around after falling off the balance beam on the second day of competition. She won the national uneven bars title and also won a bronze medal on the floor exercise.

Douglas won the all-around title at the Olympic Trials and won the one guaranteed Olympic team spot. She was named to the Olympic team alongside Wieber, McKayla Maroney, Aly Raisman, and Kyla Ross.

==== 2012 Summer Olympics ====
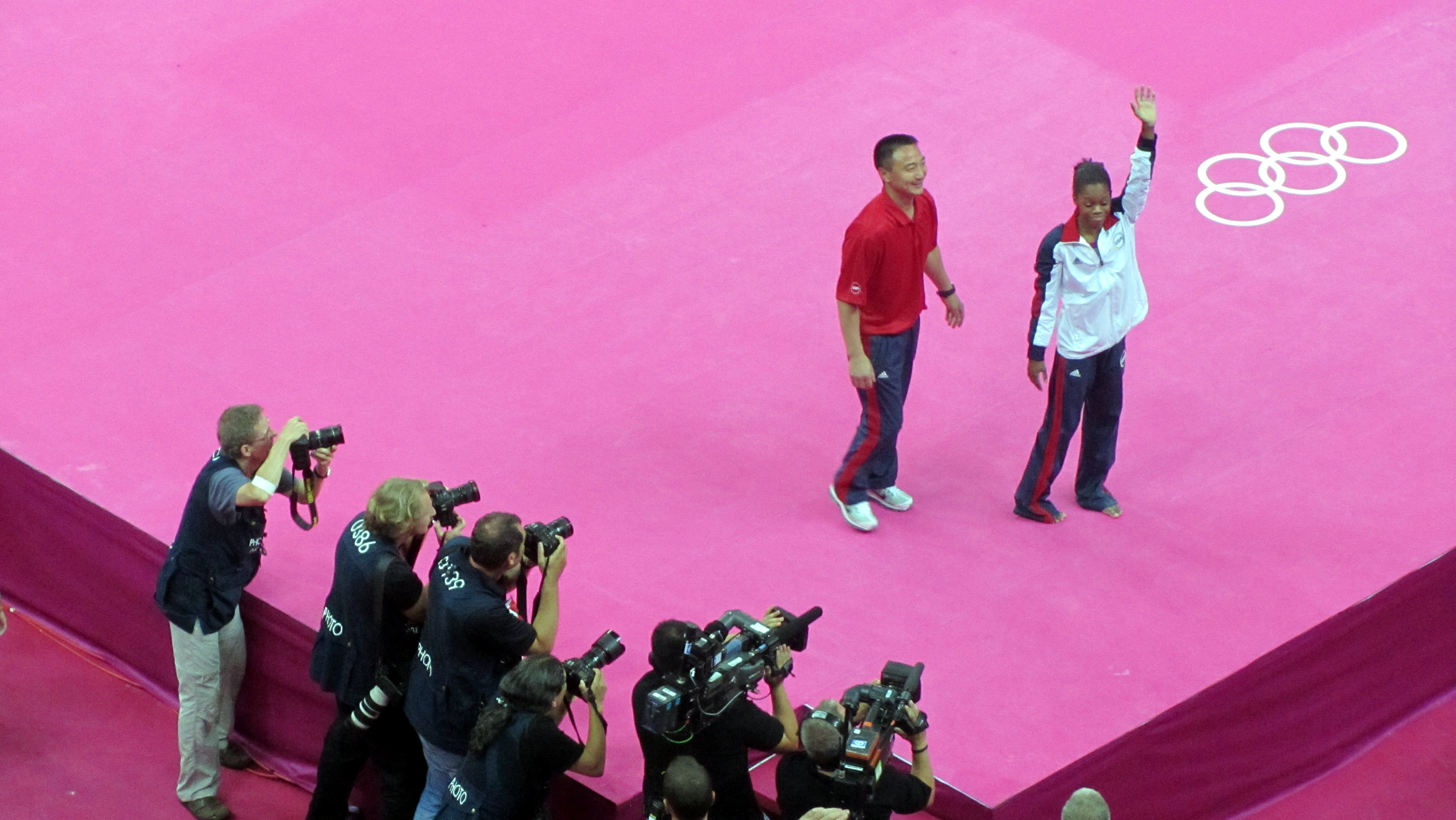
Douglas (right) during the all-around final at the 2012 Summer Olympics

At the 2012 Summer Olympics at the O2 Arena (North Greenwich Arena) in London, Douglas and her teammates (nicknamed the "Fierce Five") advanced to the team final in first place. Additionally, Douglas advanced to the all-around, uneven bars, and balance beam finals. They won the team event gold medal with Douglas contributing on all four apparatuses. They were the first American team to do so since the "Magnificent Seven" won at the 1996 Summer Olympics in Atlanta, Georgia.

Douglas won the gold medal in the all-around final with a total score of 62.232. She became the first African American woman, as well as the first woman of color of any nationality, to win the event. She also became the fourth American woman to win Olympic all-around gold as well as the third straight to do so after Mary Lou Retton in Los Angeles in 1984, Carly Patterson in Athens in 2004 and Nastia Liukin in Beijing in 2008, all of whom were at the venue and watched Douglas equal their feat. She also became the first American gymnast ever to win both the team and individual all-around gold at the same Olympics.

Douglas finished eighth in the uneven bars final, and seventh in the balance beam final after making mistakes in both. She was the first all-around champion to fail to medal in an individual event since women's gymnastics was added to the Olympics in 1952.

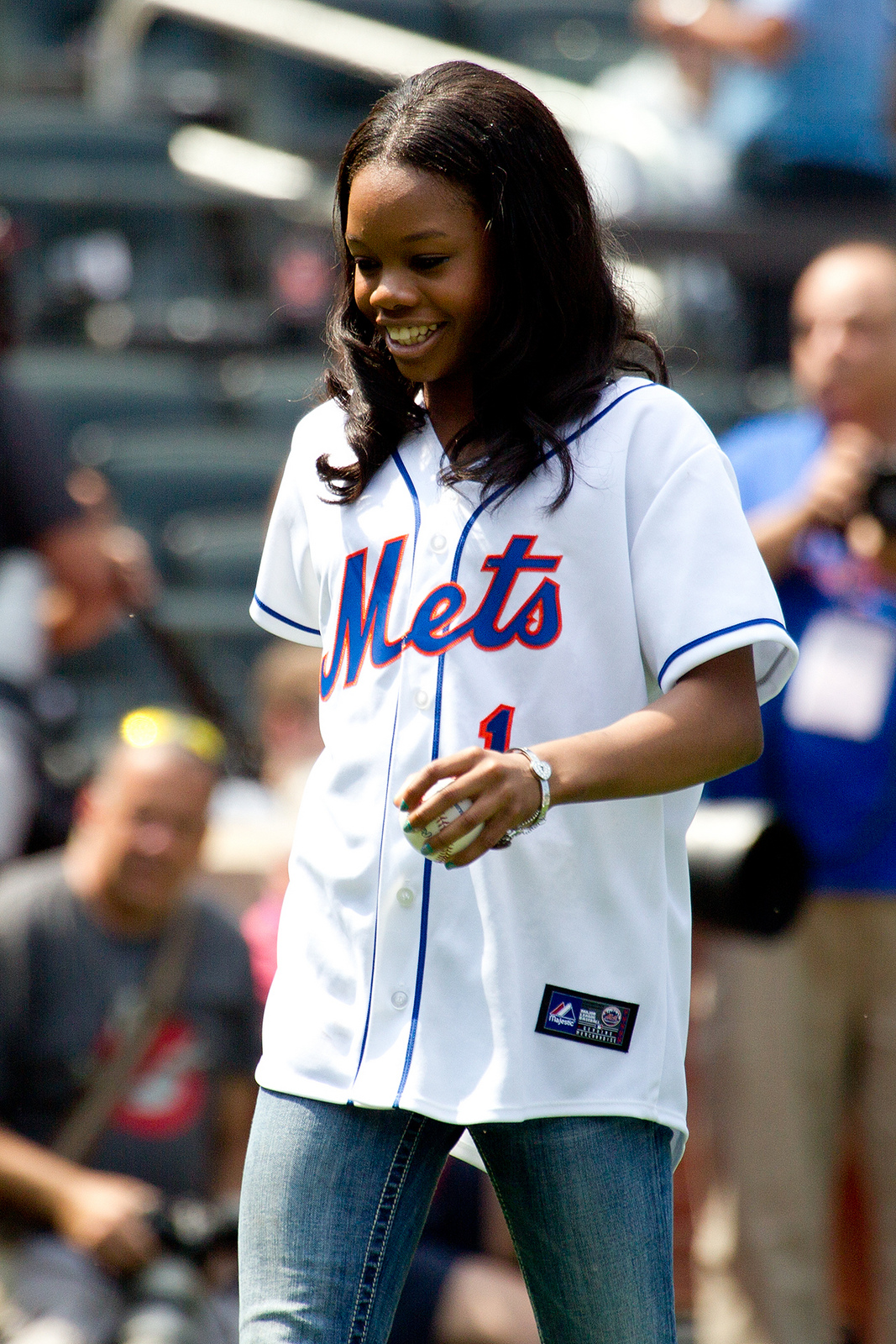
Douglas at Citi Field in 2012

=== 2013–2014 ===
In 2013, Douglas left West Des Moines, Iowa, and moved to Los Angeles to be with her family. Although she was no longer training with Liang Chow, she said she was still preparing to compete in the 2016 Summer Olympics. In mid-April 2014, Douglas returned to Iowa to train once more with Chow. However, in mid-July, it was announced that Douglas had once again left Chow. In August, news broke that Douglas would train under Kittia Carpenter at Buckeye Gymnastics in Columbus, Ohio. Carpenter announced that Douglas would not aim to return to competition during the 2014 season, as previously planned, but she did attend two national team training camps. Douglas was added back to the U.S. national team on November 25, 2014.

=== 2015 ===
In March, Douglas returned to international competition at the City of Jesolo Trophy. She helped the American team win gold and also placed fourth in the all-around behind defending World Champion Simone Biles, newcomer Bailie Key, and Olympic teammate Aly Raisman. In July, she competed at the U.S. Classic and won the silver medal in the all-around behind Biles, improving her all-around total from Jesolo by nearly two points. She also won silver medals on the uneven bars and floor exercise and a bronze medal on the balance beam. At the U.S. Championships, she finished fifth in the all-around and was named to the national team.

On October 8, 2015, Douglas was selected to compete at the 2015 World Championships alongside Biles, Raisman, Brenna Dowell, Madison Kocian, Maggie Nichols, and MyKayla Skinner. Douglas helped the U.S. team successfully defend their World title. Douglas then won the silver medal in the all-around behind Biles, becoming the first reigning Olympic all-around champion to return to the sport and win a World championships medal since Yelena Davydova in 1981. She also qualified for the uneven bars final and finished fifth and was 0.233 points away from the four-way tie for the gold medal.

On November 13, 2015, The Columbus Dispatch revealed that Douglas would participate in the 2016 American Cup, in Newark, New Jersey. This was confirmed by USA Gymnastics on December 17, 2015.

=== 2016 ===
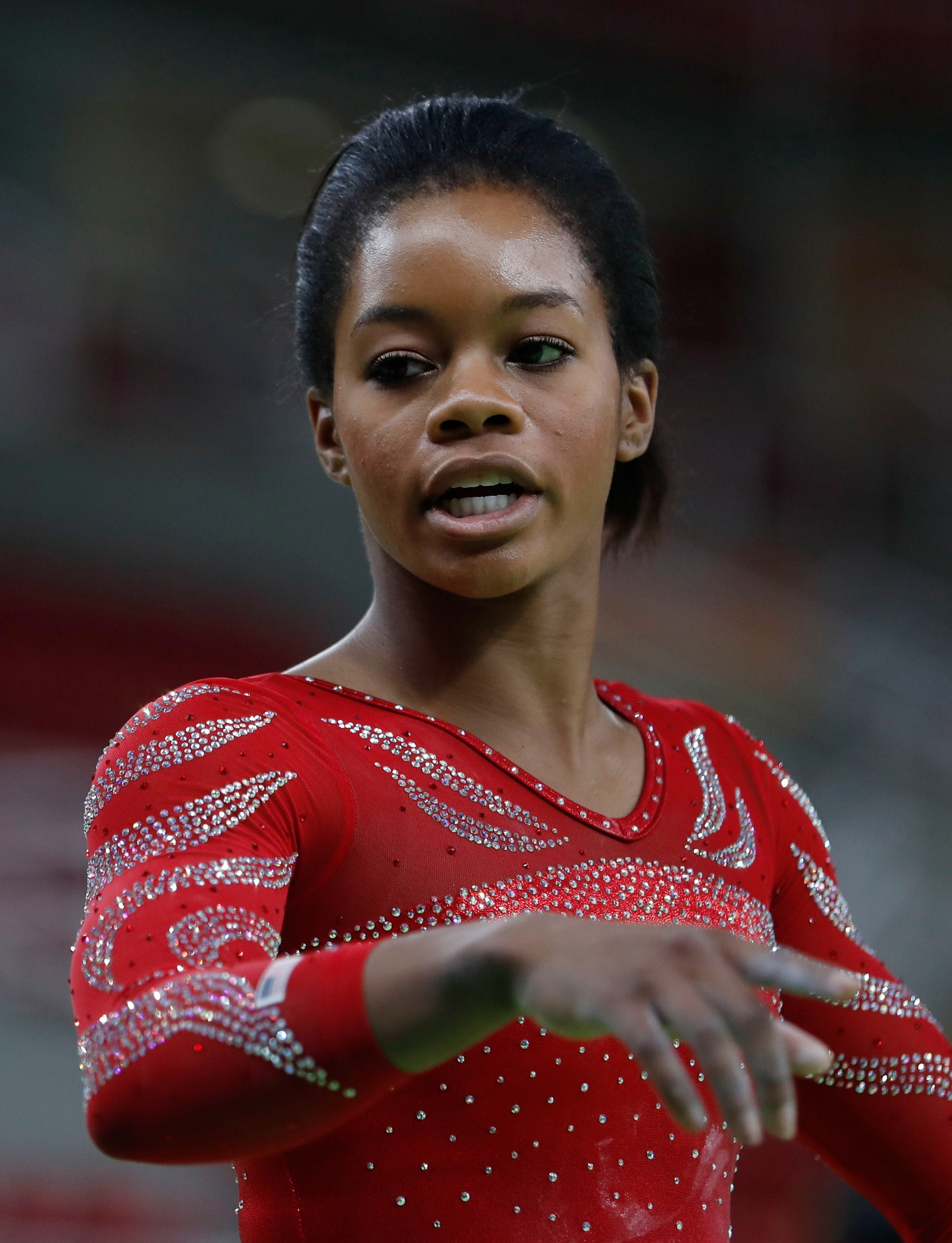
Douglas at the 2016 Summer Olympics

Douglas began the 2016 season by winning the all-around title at the American Cup by nearly half a point ahead of Maggie Nichols. This was her first international all-around win since the 2012 Summer Olympics. She was then selected to competed at the City of Jesolo Trophy, where she won another all-around title. In the event finals, she won a silver medal on the uneven bars behind teammate Ashton Locklear and a bronze medal on the floor exercise.

Douglas only competed on the uneven bars and the balance beam at the U.S. Classic, finishing third and sixth, respectively. She then competed at the U.S. Championships in St. Louis, Missouri. She made minor mistakes, including a missed connection on the uneven bars and going out of bounds on the floor exercise, and finished fourth in the all-around competition. She was selected for the U.S. national team and qualified for the Olympic Trials.

Heading into the U.S. Olympic Trials, Douglas chose to have Christian Gallardo coach her on the competition floor instead of Kittia Carpenter. On the first night of competition, she fell off the balance beam on a full turn. She fell off the balance beam again on the second night on a full-twisting back somersault and finished seventh in the all-around competition. Despite the mistakes, the U.S. national team coordinator, Márta Károlyi, selected her for the five-person Olympic team because of her strength on the uneven bars and her experience. She was selected for the team alongside Simone Biles, Laurie Hernandez, Madison Kocian, and Aly Raisman. Douglas and Raisman became the first American female gymnasts to compete in multiple Olympic Games since Dominique Dawes and Amy Chow in 2000.

==== 2016 Summer Olympics ====
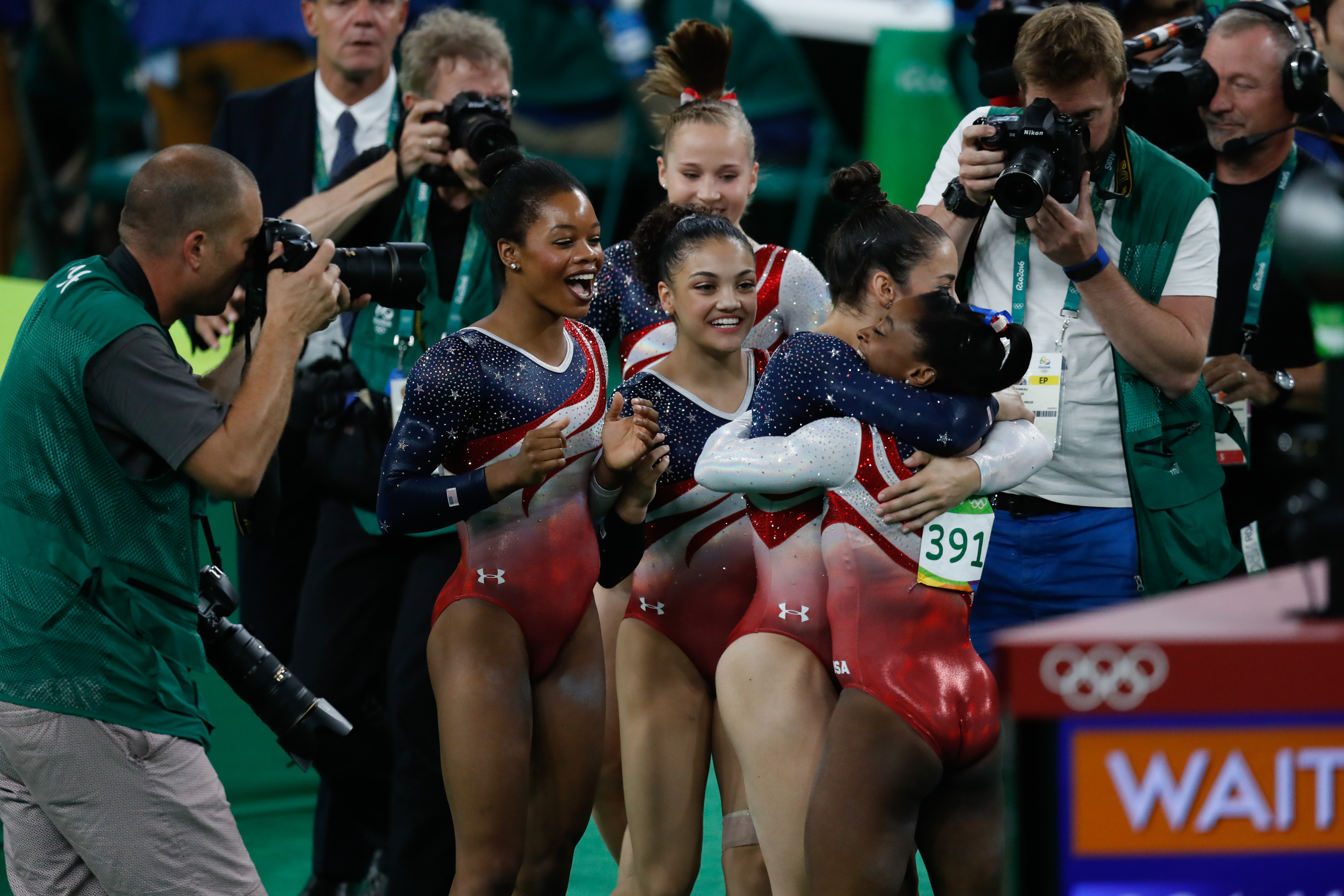
Douglas celebrating with the other Final Five members at the 2016 Olympic Games

On August 7, Douglas competed in the qualification round at the 2016 Summer Olympics at the Arena Olímpica do Rio in Rio de Janeiro. She helped the American team qualify for the final in first place by nearly ten points ahead of second-place China. Additionally, she qualified for the uneven bars final in third place. She also finished third in the all-around qualification standings. However, because she finished behind teammates Biles and Raisman, she was not eligible for the all-around final due to the two-per-country rule.

Douglas competed on the uneven bars in the team final and helped the United States win a second consecutive gold medal, which was also her third Olympic gold medal. When the final scores were announced, Douglas and her teammates called themselves the "Final Five" in honor of Márta Károlyi's retirement and the team size being reduced to four beginning in 2020. Douglas finished seventh in the uneven bars event final due to a mistake on one of her pirouettes.

=== 2022–present: Comeback ===
In October 2022, several gymnastics media outlets, such as The Gymternet and Gymcastic, reported that Douglas had recently returned to training, this time at the World Olympic Gymnastics Academy (WOGA). In November 2022, a photograph was posted online that showed Douglas in the gym with other current WOGA athletes, further strengthening rumors of a possible comeback. In February 2023, WOGA coach Valeri Liukin confirmed to NBC that Douglas had been training at his gym, and in July 2023, Douglas herself confirmed via Instagram that she had resumed training with the goal of competing at the 2024 Olympics.

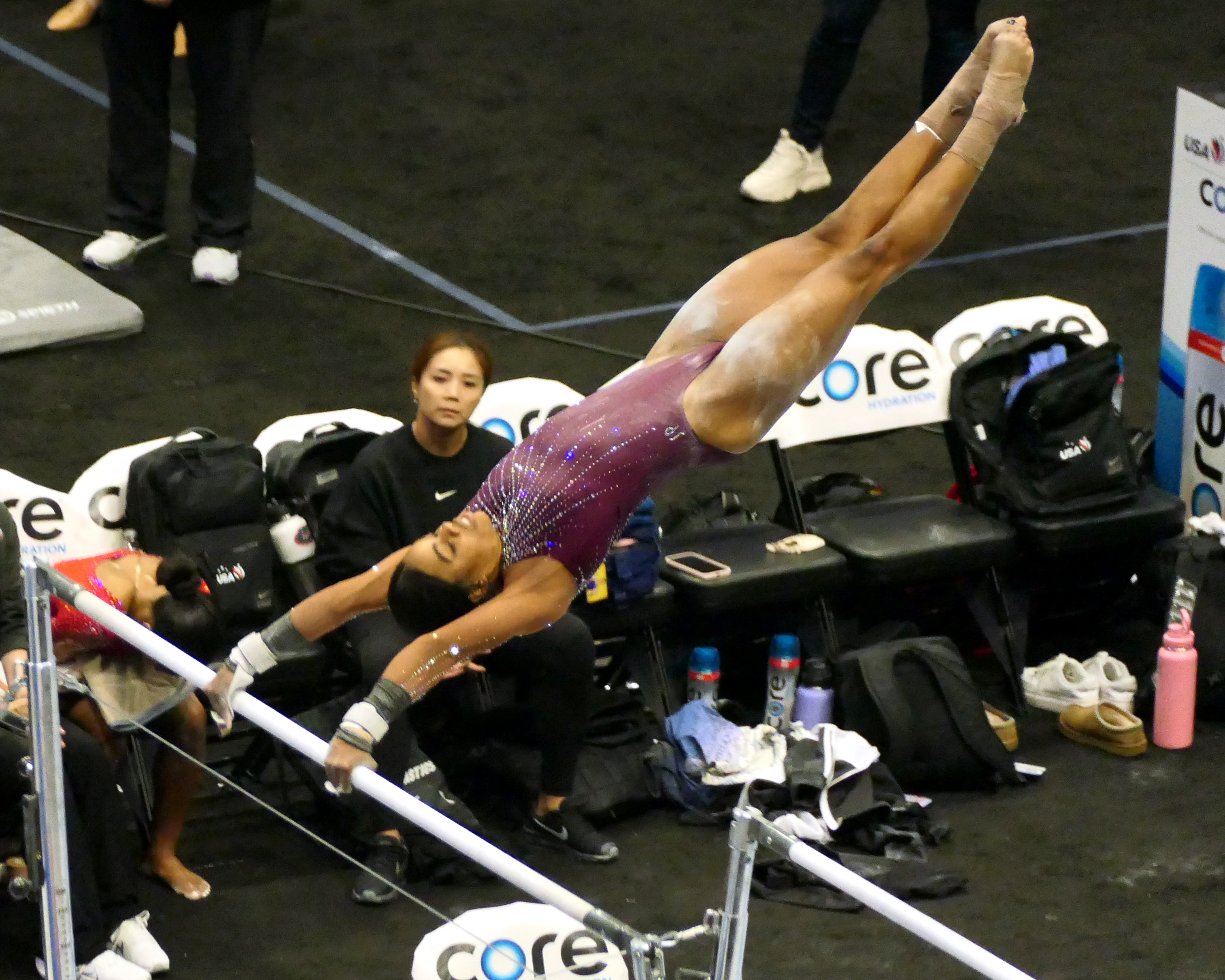
Douglas competing on uneven bars at the 2024 Core Hydration Classic

Douglas had been slated to make her competitive return in February at the 2024 Winter Cup; however she withdrew after testing positive for COVID-19 two days prior to the competition. Following her withdrawal from the Winter Cup, it was briefly reported that she was no longer training at WOGA, but she returned to WOGA after two weeks.

Douglas's first competition since the 2016 Olympic Games was the 2024 American Classic in Katy, Texas. She finished in second place on the vault, but she made mistakes on the uneven bars and floor exercise and finished with an all-around score of 50.650, short of the 51.000 score needed to qualify for the all-around at the U.S. Championships. She did qualify for the U.S. Championships on the vault, uneven bars, and balance beam.

Douglas next competed at the U.S. Classic in Hartford, Connecticut. On her first event, the uneven bars, she fell twice and scored a 10.100; she subsequently withdrew from the rest of the competition. In May 2024, Douglas was injured during training and withdrew from the U.S. Championships and competing for a spot on the 2024 Olympic team. However, she said she still aimed to compete for a spot on the 2028 Olympic team.

== Awards and honors ==
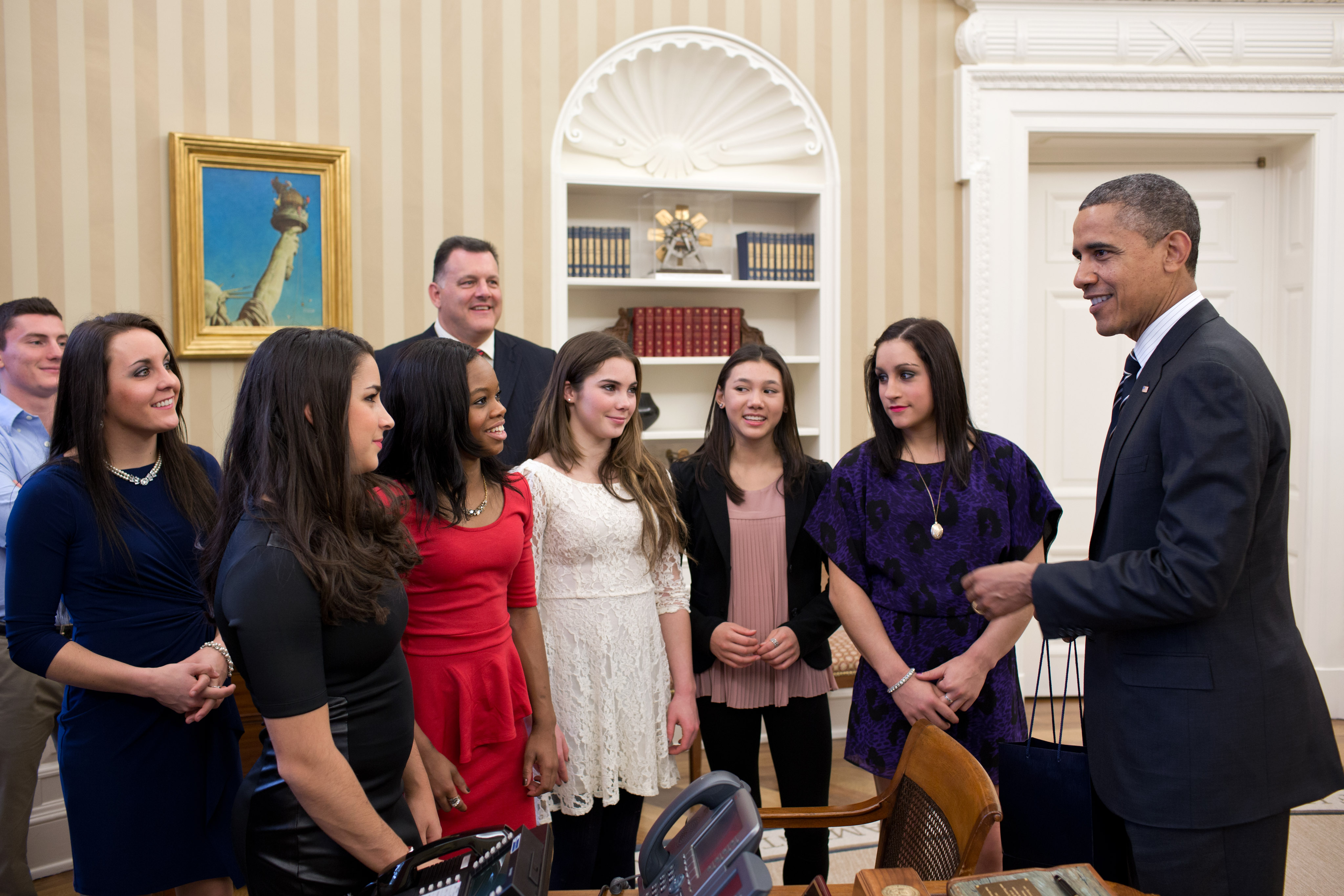
Douglas and the other Fierce Five members meeting President Barack Obama after the 2012 Summer Olympics

In December 2012, the Associated Press named Douglas the Female Athlete of the Year. She became the fourth gymnast to receive the honor, after Olga Korbut (1972), Nadia Comăneci (1976), and Mary Lou Retton (1984).

Douglas was a nominee for the Laureus World Sports Award for Breakthrough of the Year. In June 2013, Douglas received two BET Awards for her accomplishments at the 2012 Summer Olympics. In 2017, she was nominated for an ESPY Award for Best Team along with the other members of the 2016 Olympic women's gymnastics team. In 2025, she was selected for the United States Olympic & Paralympic Hall of Fame.

== In the media ==
In July 2012, Gabby Douglas and her teammates made history as the first entire Olympic gymnastics team to be featured on the cover of Sports Illustrated's Olympic Preview issue. On July 20, Douglas appeared on one of five special Time magazine Olympic covers. On August 3, the Kellogg Company announced it would feature Douglas on special-edition boxes of Corn Flakes. Later that month, on August 23, Douglas threw out the ceremonial pitch at Citi Field when the Colorado Rockies played the New York Mets.

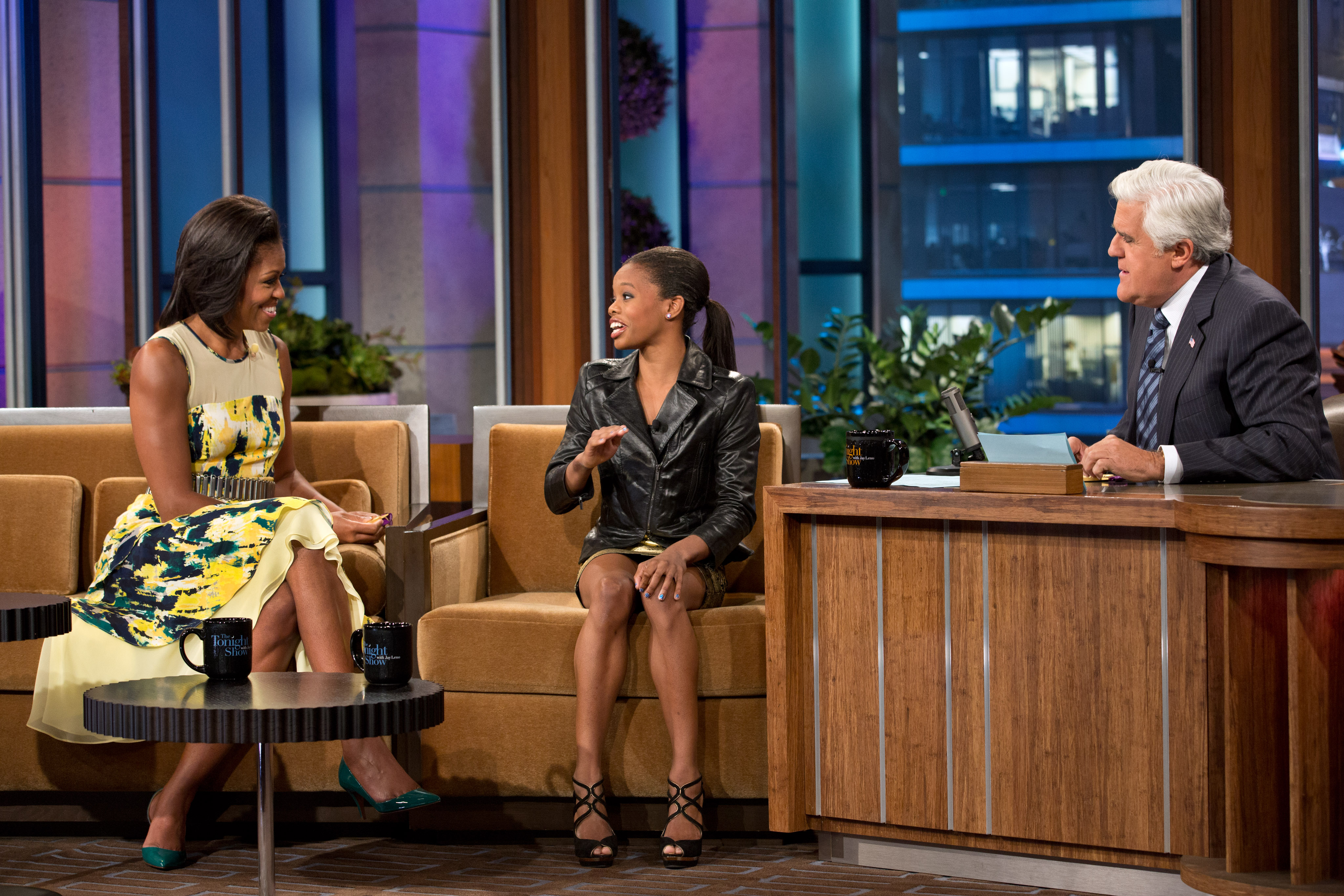
Douglas alongside Michelle Obama on The Tonight Show with Jay Leno in 2012

On August 26, 2012, Douglas spoke about racist bullying at Excalibur Gymnastics in an interview with Oprah Winfrey and how it nearly made her quit the sport. She described an incident in which she had heard other girls at the gym say, "Why doesn't Gabby do it? She's our slave", when chalk was needed to be scraped off the bars. The CEO of Excalibur Gymnastics, Gustavo Maure, denied these claims.

In September 2012, Nintendo announced that Douglas would be part of a new ad campaign for New Super Mario Bros. 2. Douglas led the Pledge of Allegiance at the 2012 Democratic National Convention in Charlotte, North Carolina.

In December 2012, Douglas released her autobiography, Grace, Gold, and Glory: My Leap of Faith. The book debuted at number four on The New York Times Young Adult Bestseller List. She performed a miniature floor routine at the 2012 MTV Video Music Awards as part of the live performance by Alicia Keys and Nicki Minaj of the "Girl on Fire" Inferno Remix. After Douglas's success in London, Minaj had opted to end her verse with a reference to her: "I ain't tryna be that / Haters wanna see that / But I got 'em aggy / 'Cause I win the gold like Gabby."

Douglas had a small acting role on the Disney XD series Kickin It in the episode "Gabby's Gold", which aired on August 12, 2013. In 2013, she donated gymnastic equipment used at the 2012 Summer Olympics to the National Museum of African American History and Culture.

The Gabby Douglas Story aired on Lifetime on February 1, 2014, starring Imani Hakim. Douglas performed all of the gymnastic stunts herself. In 2015, it was announced that a reality television show for the Oxygen channel had been commissioned that would follow Douglas and her family's life, issued under the working title Douglas Family Gold. The show premiered on May 25, 2016.

On August 23, 2016, it was announced that Douglas would be one of the judges at the 2017 Miss America pageant. In 2016, American rapper Cupcakke referenced Douglas in the lyrics of her song Spider-Man Dick. On July 11, 2016, Mattel released a "Gymnast Barbie" doll modeled after Douglas.

In 2017, after a 60 Minutes interview with Olympic gold medalist Aly Raisman who said that Larry Nassar, a former doctor for USA Gymnastics, had sexually abused her when she was 15 years old, Douglas sent a tweet saying that "dressing in a provocative/sexual way incites the wrong crowd." She was criticized for it by fellow Olympic teammate Simone Biles and others, who interpreted the tweet as criticism of Raisman and "victim-shaming". Douglas later apologized for the tweet and said that Nassar had sexually abused her as well.

Douglas appeared disguised as a gray-haired aspiring gym owner in a "Celebrity Edition" episode of Undercover Boss that first aired on May 11, 2018. In 2020, Douglas competed on The Masked Singer spin-off The Masked Dancer as "Cotton Candy" and was declared the winner of the season. In 2022, she appeared as herself with Dominique Dawes and Laurie Hernandez in the episode "A Perfect 10" of the second season of the Disney+ animated series The Proud Family: Louder and Prouder, judging a gymnastics competition.

== Competitive history ==
Competitive history of Gabby Douglas at the junior level
| Year | Event | Team | AA | VT | UB | BB | FX |
2008
| 2008 | U.S. Classic | | 10 | 16 | 8 | 13 | 13 |
| 2008 | U.S. Championships | | 16 | 21 | 20 | 12 | 17 |
2009
| 2009 | U.S. Championships | | | | | 5 | |
2010
| 2010 | Nastia Liukin Cup | | 4 | | | | |
| 2010 | U.S. Classic | | 9 | 6 | 20 | 3rd place, bronze medalist(s) | 20 |
| 2010 | U.S. Championships | | 4 | 4 | 11 | 2nd place, silver medalist(s) | 8 |
| 2010 | Pan American Championships | 1st place, gold medalist(s) | 5 | | 1st place, gold medalist(s) | | |

Competitive history of Gabby Douglas at the senior level
| Year | Event | Team | AA | VT | UB | BB | FX |
2011
| 2011 | City of Jesolo Trophy | 1st place, gold medalist(s) | 4 | | | 3rd place, bronze medalist(s) | 3rd place, bronze medalist(s) |
| 2011 | U.S. Classic | | | | 2nd place, silver medalist(s) | | |
| 2011 | U.S. Championships | | 7 | | 3rd place, bronze medalist(s) | 19 | 11 |
| 2011 | World Championships | 1st place, gold medalist(s) | | | 5 | | |
2012
| 2012 | Pacific Rim Championships | 1st place, gold medalist(s) | | | 1st place, gold medalist(s) | | |
| 2012 | U.S. Classic | | | | 1st place, gold medalist(s) | 7 | 3rd place, bronze medalist(s) |
| 2012 | U.S. Championships | | 2nd place, silver medalist(s) | | 1st place, gold medalist(s) | 7 | 3rd place, bronze medalist(s) |
| 2012 | U.S. Olympic Trials | | 1st place, gold medalist(s) | | 1st place, gold medalist(s) | 6 | 3rd place, bronze medalist(s) |
| 2012 | Olympic Games | 1st place, gold medalist(s) | 1st place, gold medalist(s) | | 8 | 7 | |
2015
| 2015 | City of Jesolo Trophy | 1st place, gold medalist(s) | 4 | | | | |
| 2015 | U.S. Classic | | 2nd place, silver medalist(s) | | 2nd place, silver medalist(s) | 3rd place, bronze medalist(s) | 2nd place, silver medalist(s) |
| 2015 | U.S. Championships | | 5 | | 4 | 9 | 6 |
| 2015 | World Championships | 1st place, gold medalist(s) | 2nd place, silver medalist(s) | | 5 | | |
2016
| 2016 | American Cup | | 1st place, gold medalist(s) | | | | |
| 2016 | City of Jesolo Trophy | 1st place, gold medalist(s) | 1st place, gold medalist(s) | | 2nd place, silver medalist(s) | | 3rd place, bronze medalist(s) |
| 2016 | U.S. Classic | | | | 3rd place, bronze medalist(s) | 6 | |
| 2016 | U.S. Championships | | 4 | | 6 | 6 | 5 |
| 2016 | U.S. Olympic Trials | | 7 | 6 | 3rd place, bronze medalist(s) | 11 | 6 |
| 2016 | Olympic Games | 1st place, gold medalist(s) | | | 7 | | |
| 2024 | American Classic | | 11 | 2nd place, silver medalist(s) | 20 | 5 | 20 |
| 2024 | U.S. Classic | | | | 43 | | |

== Floor music ==
| Year | Music Title |
|---|---|
| 2007–2008 | "Hora Presta" by Gilles Apap & the Transylvanian Mountain Boys |
| 2011–2012 | "Memories (Fuck Me I'm Famous Remix)" by David Guetta feat. Kid Cudi & "We No Speak Americano" by Yolanda Be Cool and DCUP |
| 2012 | "Bon Bon" by Pitbull, DJ Alvaro mix of "We No Speak Americano" by Yolanda Be Cool and DCUP. |
| 2015–2016 | Dare (La La La)" by Shakira |

== Books ==
- Douglas, Gabrielle; Burford, Michelle (2012). Grace, Gold, and Glory: My Leap of Faith. Zondervan. 224pp. ISBN 978-0310740681.
- Douglas, Gabrielle (2013). Raising The Bar. Zondervan. 144 pp. ISBN 978-0-310-74070-4

== See also ==
- List of Olympic female gymnasts for the United States
