= Bucket handle tear =

Type of injury of the knee

A bucket-handle tear of the knee is a specific type of meniscal injury characterized by a longitudinal tear of the medial or lateral meniscus, where a displaced inner fragment resembles the appearance of a "bucket handle". This displaced meniscal fragment often remains attached at the anterior and posterior horns but dislocates into the intercondylar notch of the knee joint. Such injuries can cause mechanical symptoms, including locking and restricted movement of the knee.

== Anatomy ==
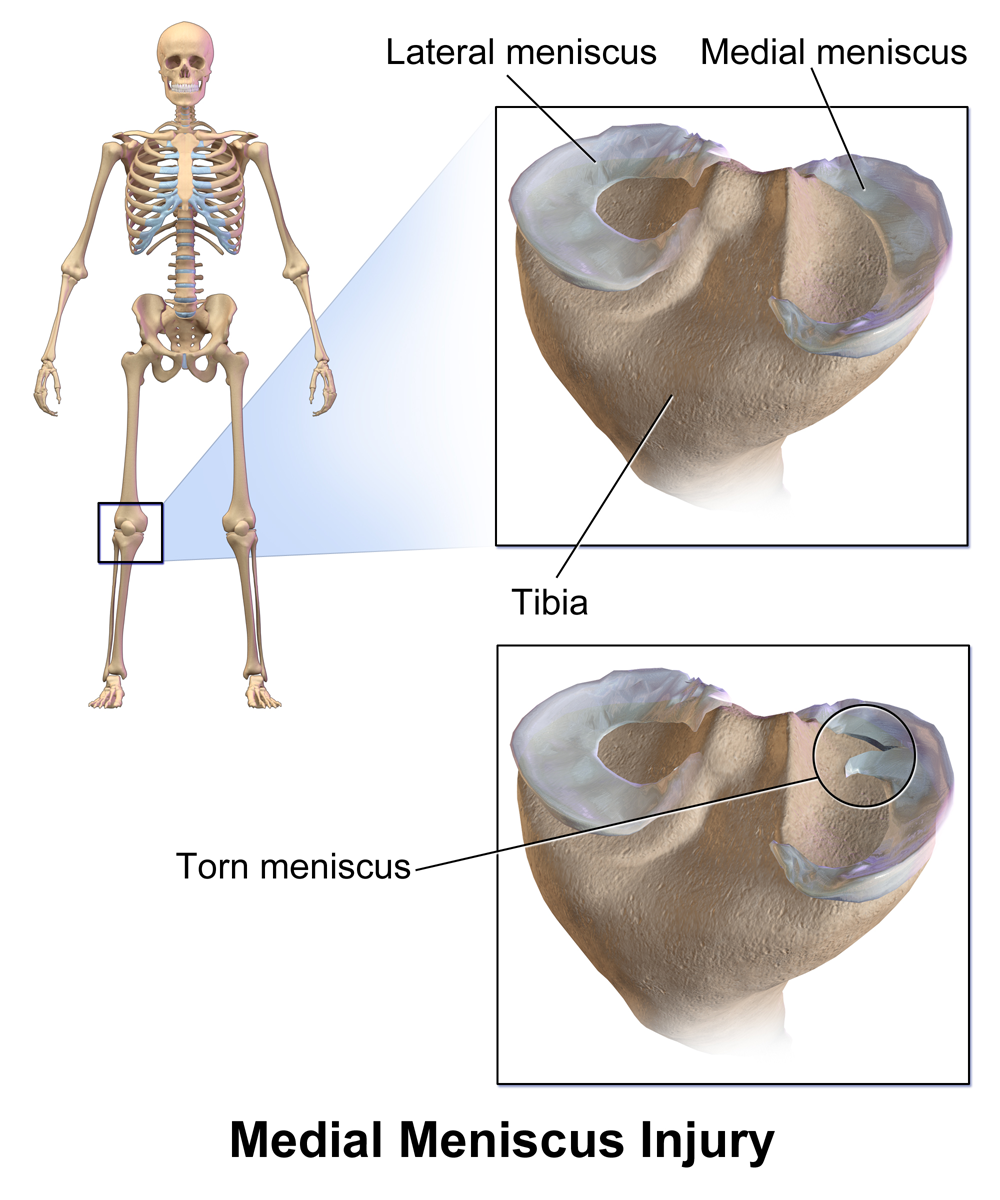
Anatomy of medial meniscus

The knee joint contains two crescent-shaped fibrocartilaginous structures, the menisci (medial and lateral), which serve as shock absorbers and stabilize the joint during movement. Each meniscus has an outer vascular zone (red-red zone), which has a good blood supply and healing potential as well as a central avascular zone (white-white zone), which has limited healing capability.

The medial meniscus is more prone to injury due to its firm attachment to the joint capsule and limited mobility. The lateral meniscus is more mobile and less frequently injured.

== Pathophysiology ==
A bucket-handle tear occurs when a significant longitudinal tear develops, often as a result of trauma or excessive twisting forces applied to the knee. The displaced fragment can flip into the intercondylar notch, impeding normal joint motion. The injury is most commonly seen in:

- Young, active individuals: Especially those engaged in sports like soccer, basketball, or skiing.
- Traumatic events: Sudden twisting or pivoting movements with the knee in flexion and rotation.
- Degenerative knees: Less commonly, a bucket-handle tear can occur in older individuals with preexisting meniscal degeneration.

The injury frequently occurs in conjunction with anterior cruciate ligament (ACL) tears.

== Clinical presentation ==
Patients with a bucket-handle tear typically present with the following symptoms:

- Knee locking: A classic symptom where the displaced fragment physically blocks full extension of the knee
- Pain: Sudden, sharp pain localized to the joint line
- Swelling: Acute hemarthrosis (blood in the joint) due to associated trauma
- Mechanical symptoms: Popping, clicking, or catching during movement
- Reduced range of motion: Especially inability to fully extend the knee (extension block)

The patient may report a history of a twisting injury or sports-related trauma

== Diagnosis ==
Diagnosis of a bucket-handle tear is based on a combination of clinical examination and imaging studies:

=== Physical examination ===
Findings include joint-line tenderness on the affected side, a positive McMurray test (pain or a palpable click on tibial rotation with the knee flexed), and an extension block in which the patient cannot straighten the knee fully.

=== Imaging ===
Magnetic resonance imaging (MRI) is the standard imaging modality for confirming a bucket-handle tear. Two characteristic signs are the double PCL sign, in which the displaced fragment lies parallel to the posterior cruciate ligament on sagittal images and mimics a second PCL, and the flipped meniscus sign, in which the fragment produces an abnormal band of signal within the intercondylar notch. Plain radiographs cannot show meniscal tears directly but may reveal a joint effusion or exclude fractures.

== Treatment ==
Because the displaced fragment causes mechanical symptoms and will not reduce or heal spontaneously, management is almost always surgical.

=== Arthroscopic surgery ===
When the tear lies within the vascular red–red zone, arthroscopic meniscal repair with sutures is preferred, particularly in younger patients, because it preserves meniscal tissue and long-term joint health. If the tear extends into the avascular white–white zone or the meniscal tissue is too damaged to repair, a partial meniscectomy is performed instead.

=== Rehabilitation ===
Postoperative rehabilitation focuses on restoring range of motion, quadriceps strength, and joint stability through physical therapy. Weight-bearing is advanced gradually according to the type of repair. Return to sport after meniscal repair typically takes four to six months, longer if there is a concurrent ACL reconstruction.
