= Child bone fracture =

A child bone fracture or a pediatric fracture is a medical condition in which a bone of a child (a person younger than the age of 18) is cracked or broken. About 15% of all injuries in children are fracture injuries. Bone fractures in children are different from adult bone fractures because a child's bones are still growing. Also, more consideration needs to be taken when a child fractures a bone since it will affect the child in their growth.

On an everyday basis, bones will support many kinds of forces naturally applied to them, but when the forces are too strong, the bones will break. For example, when an adolescent jumps off a trampoline and lands on their feet, the bones and connective tissue in the adolescent's feet will usually absorb the force, flex, then return to their original shape. However, if the adolescent lands and the force is too strong, the bones and the connective tissue will not be able to support the force and will fracture.

== Types of fractures ==
The bones of a child are more likely to bend than to break completely because they are softer and the periosteum is stronger and thicker. The fractures that are most common in children are the incomplete fractures; these fractures are the greenstick and torus or buckle fractures.

=== Greenstick fracture ===
This fracture involves a bend on one side of the bone and a partial fracture on the other side. The name is by analogy with green (i.e., fresh) wood which similarly breaks on the outside when bent. The Sub-nanostructure of cortical bone may provide one possible explanation for the greenstick fractures in children. On the contrary to adults bone tissue, the low ratio between the mature and the immature enzymatic cross-links in children bone tissue is a potential explanation of the presence of greenstick fractures in children.

=== Torus or buckle fracture ===
This fracture occurs at the metaphyseal locations and resemble the torus or base of a pillar in architectural terms. Acute angulation of the cortex is noted, as opposed to the usual curved surface. It is caused by impaction. They are usually the result of a force acting on the longitudinal axis of the bone: they are typically a consequence of a fall on an outstretched arm, so they mainly involve the distal radial metaphysis. The word torus is derived from the Latin word 'torus,' meaning swelling or protuberance.

=== Bow fracture ===
The bone becomes curved along its longitudinal axis.

=== Hairline fracture ===
An incomplete fracture (a thin crack in the bone that doesn't go all the way through the bone.)

=== Single fracture ===
The bone is fractured only in one place.

=== Segmental fracture ===
Fracture in two or more places in the same bone.

=== Comminuted fracture ===
The bone fractures in more than two places or is crushed into pieces.

=== Corner or bucket-handle fracture ===
A corner fracture or bucket-handle fracture is fragmentation of the distal end of one or both femurs, with the loose piece appearing at the bone margins as an osseous density paralleling the metaphysis. The term bucket-handle fracture is used where the loose bone is rather wide at the distal end, making it end in a crescent shape. These types of fractures are characteristic of child abuse-related injuries.

=== Other ways to describe a fracture ===
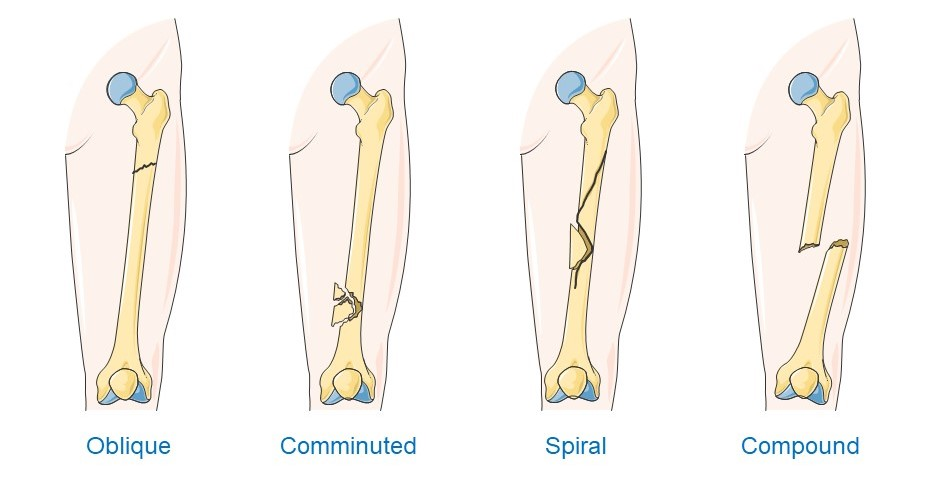
An illustration showing types of fracture.

==== Closed fracture ====
A fracture that doesn't penetrate the skin.

==== Open (compound) fracture ====
A fracture resulting in the ends of a bone penetrating the skin (these pose an increased risk of infection).

==== Non-displaced fracture ====
A fracture where the bone cracks completely and the pieces line up.

==== Displaced fracture ====
A fracture where the bone cracks completely in two or more pieces, and the pieces move out of alignment (this type of fracture might require surgery to make sure the pieces are aligned before casting).

== Symptoms and signs ==
Even though symptoms vary widely after experiencing a bone fracture, the most common fracture symptoms include:

- pain in the fractured area
- swelling in the fractured area
- obvious deformity in the fractured area
- not being able to use or move the fractured area in a normal manner
- bruising, warmth, or redness in the fractured area

== Cause ==
=== Low bone mineral content ===
Children with generalized disorders such as renal diseases, cystic fibrosis, diabetes mellitus, growth hormone deficiency, and osteogenesis imperfecta disorders are at risk. Neuromuscular disorders: children with cerebral palsy, spina bifida, and arthrogryposis, have a higher risk of a fracture because of the combination of joint stiffness and poor mineralization.

=== Fracture personality ===
Children in general are at greater risk because of their high activity levels. Children that have risk-prone behaviors are at even greater risk.

=== Child abuse ===
Over 2.5 million child abuse and neglect cases are reported every year, and thirty-five out of every hundred cases are physical abuse cases. Bone fractures are sometimes part of the physical abuse of children; knowing the symptoms of bone fractures in physical abuse and recognizing the actual risks in physical abuse will help forward the prevention of future abuse and injuries. Astoundingly, these abuse fractures, if not dealt with correctly, have a potential to lead to the death of the child. Fracture patterns in abuse fractures that are very common with abuse are fractures in the growing part of a long bone (between the shaft and the separated part of the bone), fractures of the humeral shaft (long bone between the shoulder and elbow), ribs, scapula, outer end of the clavicle, and vertebra. Multiple fractures of varying age, bilateral fractures, and complex skull fractures are also linked to abuse. Fractures of varying ages occur in about thirteen percent of all cases.

== Pathophysiology ==
=== Differences between child and adult bones ===
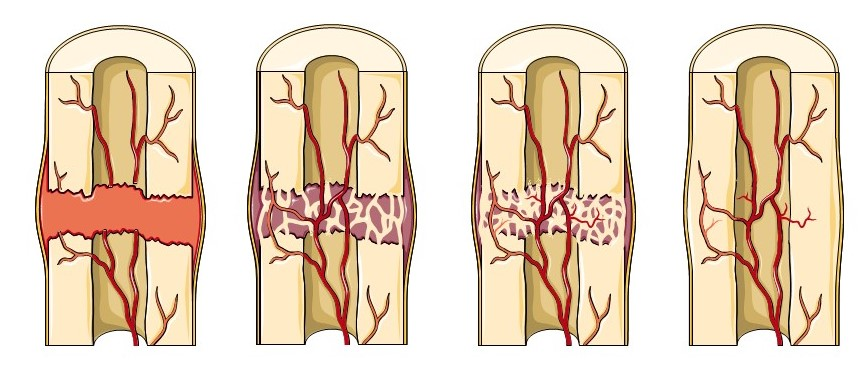
An illustration showing the stages of healing of fractured bone.

There are differences in the bone structure of a child and an adult. These differences are important for the correct evaluation and treatment of the fractures. A child's bones heal faster than an adult's because a thicker, stronger, and more active dense fibrous membrane (periosteum) covers the surface of their bones. The periosteum has blood vessels that supply oxygen and nutrition to the bone cells. The stronger and thicker periosteum in children causes a better supply of oxygen and nutrients to the bones, and this helps in faster remodeling of the fractured bones. The periosteum in children causes a more rapid union of fractured bones and an increased potential for remodeling. A child's fractures not only heal more quickly, but are significantly reduced due to the thickness and strength of a child's periosteum. But this thickness also has its drawbacks; when there is a small displacement in the periosteum the thickness and strength of it will make the fracture in the periosteum difficult to diagnose.

==== Growth plate ====
Growth plates are the areas in bones where the bones grow. In children the growth plates are open, which helps to manage a child's fractures.

==== Age and sex related fractures ====
Bone fracture types differ depending on the age and sex of the child. The changes in the bones over time cause variance in the pattern and number of bone fracture injuries. The probability of bone fractures in children increases with age. For a small child, injuries will most likely be minimal because the child doesn't have the speed or mass to cause serious injuries. When age increases, so does mass and speed resulting in more serious fractures. The age when girls usually fracture a bone is twelve and for boys the age is fourteen. Also, girls statistically have fewer fractures than boys. About half of boys and one-fourth of girls are likely to have a fracture during childhood. The wrist is also the most likely part of the body to be injured. As sport activities increase, the fractures in children increase as well, especially for boys who participate in either wrestling or football. Much like bone types in the different stages of childhood are varying, so the bone fracture injuries in infants, children, and adolescents vary. Careful evaluation for the best treatment of each child is needed.

== Treatment ==
When a child experiences a fracture, they will have pain and will not be able to easily move the fractured area. A doctor or emergency care should be contacted immediately. In some cases even though the child will not have pain and will still be able to move, medical help must be sought out immediately. To decrease the pain, bleeding, and movement a physician will put a splint on the fractured area. Treatment for a fracture follows a simple rule: the bones have to be aligned correctly and prevented from moving out of place until the bones are healed. The specific treatment applied depends on how severe the fracture is, if it's an open or closed fracture, and the specific bone involved in the fracture (a hip fracture is treated differently from a forearm fracture for example) Different treatments for different fractures: The general treatments for common fractures are as follows:

=== Cast immobilization ===
Because most fractures heal successfully after having been repositioned, a simple plaster or fiberglass cast is commonly used.

=== Functional cast or brace ===
A cast, or brace, that allows limited movement of the nearby joints is acceptable for some fractures.

=== Traction ===
This treatment consists of aligning a bone or bones by a gentle, steady pulling action. The pulling may be transmitted to the bone or bones by a metal pin through a bone or by skin tapes. This is a preliminary treatment used in preparation for other secondary treatments.

=== Open reduction and internal fixation ===
This treatment is only used when an orthopedic surgeon assigns it to restore the fractured bone to its original function. This method positions the bones to their exact location, but there is a risk for infection and other complications. The procedure involves the orthopedist performing surgery on the bone to align the bone fragments, followed by the placement of special screws or metal plates to the outer surface of the bone. The fragments can also be held together by running metal rods through the marrow in the center of the bone.

=== External fixation ===
This treatment also requires surgery by an orthopedist. Pins or screws are placed into the fractured bone above and below the fracture site. The orthopedic surgeon repositions the bone fragments and pins or screws are connected to a metal bar or bars outside the skin which holds the bones in their proper position so they can heal. The external fixation device is removed after an appropriate time period.

== Prognosis ==
Fractures in children generally heal relatively fast, but may take several weeks to heal. Most growth plate fractures heal without any lasting effects. Rarely, bridging bone may form across growth plates, causing stunted growth and/or curving. In such cases, the bridging bone may need to be surgically removed. A growth plate fracture may also stimulate growth, causing a longer bone than the corresponding bone on the other side. Therefore, the American Academy of Orthopaedic Surgeons recommends regular follow-up for at least a year after growth plate fractures.
