= Kittia Carpenter =

American gymnastics coach

- Education: Arizona State University
- Occupation: Gymnastics coach
- Employers: Buckeye Gymnastics; Region 5 Gymnastics

Kittia Carpenter, née Kennedy (born 1958 or 1959), is an American artistic gymnastics coach and judge. As the head coach of Buckeye Gymnastics in Westerville, Ohio, she has trained gymnasts including Nia Dennis and Gabby Douglas.

Carpenter grew up in Phoenix, Arizona, attending Sunnyslope High School before competing as a gymnast at Arizona State University between 1976 and 1980. During her time at ASU, the gymnastics team continued to contend for regional honors.

In 1986, she became the team coach at Buckeye Gymnastics in Westerville, Ohio, being promoted to head coach and competition director in 1995. Carpenter coached Nia Dennis until 2015 and was the coach for Gabby Douglas between 2014 and 2016.

In the wake of the USA Gymnastics sex abuse scandal, the organization replaced its entire board of directors in 2018, electing Carpenter as the national membership director representing women's gymnastics.
