= 2016 AT&T American Cup =

- The official logo of the event
- Venue: Prudential Center
- Location: Newark, New Jersey, U.S.
- Dates: March 5, 2016
- Competitors: 18 from 11 nations

Medalists
gold medal	(United States) Gabrielle Douglas (Japan) Ryohei Kato
silver medal	(United States) Maggie Nichols (United States) Donnell Whittenburg
bronze medal	(Canada) Ellie Black (China) Sun Wei

The 2016 American Cup, known as the 2016 AT&T American Cup for sponsorship reasons, was the fortieth edition of the American Cup, part of the World Cup circuit in artistic gymnastics. It was held on March 5, 2016, at the Prudential Center in Newark. Gabrielle Douglas of the United States won the women's competition, and Ryohei Kato of Japan won the men's.

USA Gymnastics promoted the event as the beginning of preparations for the 2016 Olympic Games. For the seventh year, the competition was held in conjunction with the Nastia Liukin Cup. For the first time, it was also held in conjunction with the Elite Team Cup, a men's competition.

It was the first time that USA Gymnastics held a national artistic gymnastics competition in New Jersey. Two days beforehand, on March 3, 2016, it was announced that the 2017 AT&T American Cup would also be held at the Prudential Center.

== Background ==
On March 4, 2015, USA Gymnastics announced that the 2016 AT&T American Cup had been awarded to the Prudential Center. The president of USA Gymnastics, Steve Penny, called the Prudential Center "one of our most successful stops on the 2012 Kellogg's Tour of Superstars", later adding, "The New York metropolitan area has a strong gymnastics community, and we look forward to again kicking off the Olympic year in the area." Although New Jersey had never hosted the event before, New York City has done so twelve times, most recently in 2012.

USA Today reported that organizers originally wanted to return to Madison Square Garden in Manhattan, which had hosted the American Cup in every Summer Olympics year since 2000. However, a scheduling conflict (a New York Knicks and Detroit Pistons game) forced them to relocate.

== Venue ==
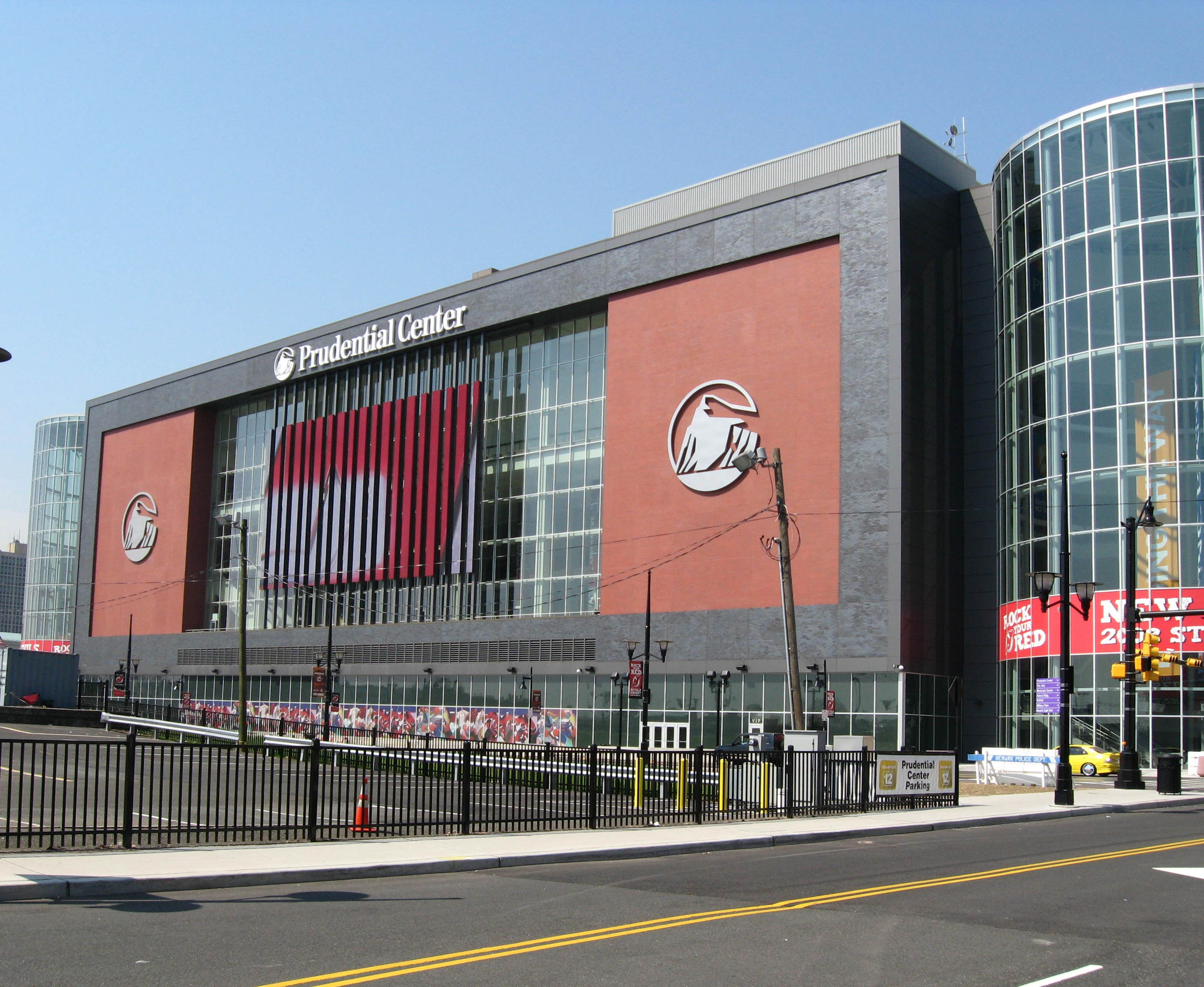
The Prudential Center in Newark, New Jersey.

Opened on October 25, 2007, the Prudential Center is located in the central business district of Newark, New Jersey. Designed by HOK Sport, the arena is home to the National Hockey League's New Jersey Devils and two NCAA teams: the Seton Hall Pirates and NJIT Highlanders. It was also home to the Brooklyn Nets (then the New Jersey Nets), New York Liberty and the New York Titans.

The arena has held a gymnastics-related event before; it was a stop on the 2012 Kellogg's Tour of Gymnastics Champions.

== Sponsors ==
AT&T was the title sponsor of the event as part of a 2013–16 contract with USA Gymnastics. The company, which also provides USA Gymnastics with telecom services, became the title sponsor in 2011.

Hilton HHonors served as an additional sponsor. The company is the official hotel partner for Team USA and offers gymnastics event spectators 15% discounts at its hotels. Additionally, HHonors sponsors several male gymnasts and helps pay for training expenses and their residences at the U.S. Olympic Training Center.

Kellogg's was the final sponsor. It also worked with USA Gymnastics on the 2012 Tour of Gymnastics Champions.

== Prize money ==
The winners received CHF 15,000 (US$ 14,551.52), the standard prize for International Federation of Gymnastics World Cup events.

Rank	Amount (CHF)	Amount (USD)
1	15,000	14,551.52
2	12,000	11,644.27
3	8,000	7,762.85
4	5,000	4,851.78
5	4,000	3,880.11
6	3,000	2,910.08
7	2,000	1,940.71
8	1,000	969.93
9	500	485.01

Notes
Exchange rate correct as of November 27, 2015.

== Participants ==
Women (WAG)	Men (MAG)
(United States) Gabrielle Douglas	(United States) Sam Mikulak
(United States) Maggie Nichols	(United States) Donnell Whittenburg
(Netherlands) Tisha Volleman	(China) Sun Wei
(Canada) Ellie Black	(Switzerland) Pablo Brägger
(Brazil) Lorrane Oliveira	(Brazil) Lucas Bitencourt
(Japan) Mai Murakami	(Japan) Ryōhei Katō
(United Kingdom) Amy Tinkler	(United Kingdom) Nile Wilson
(Italy) Carlotta Ferlito	(South Korea) Park Min-soo
(Germany) Tabea Alt	(Germany) Andreas Bretschneider

=== Qualified federations ===
Invitations to the AT&T American Cup are issued based on placement at the previous year's World Championships.

Country	NOC	MAG	WAG	Total
Brazil	BRA	1	0*	1
Canada	CAN	0	1	1
China	CHN	1	1	2
Great Britain	GBR	1	1	2
Italy	ITA	0	1	1
Japan	JPN	1	1	2
Netherlands	NED	0*	1	1
Russia	RUS	1	1	2
South Korea	KOR	1	0*	1
Switzerland	SUI	1	0*	1
United States	USA	2	2	4

Notes
* denotes national federations that received a reserve qualification spot.

=== Reserves ===
Nations that finished in places 9–12 in the team competition at the 2015 World Artistic Gymnastics Championships were allocated one reserve spot each to the Cup. The top 4 ranked individual all-around competitors whose teams did not finish in the top 12 were also given Cup bids.

No.	MAG Team	MAG NOC	MAG Gymnast	WAG Team	WAG NOC	WAG Gymnast
1	Germany	GER	TBD	Brazil	BRA	TBD
2	France	FRA	TBD	France	FRA	TBD
3	Netherlands	NED	TBD	Belgium	BEL	TBD
4	Ukraine	UKR	TBD	Germany	GER	Tabea Alt
5	Cuba	CUB	Manrique Larduet	Switzerland	SUI	Giulia Steingruber
6	Belarus	BLR	Dzmitry Barkalau	Hungary	HUN	Noémi Makra
7	Spain	ESP	Ruben Lopez	Romania	ROU	Larisa Iordache
8	Romania	ROU	Cristian Bataga	South Korea	KOR	Heo Seon-mi

== Results ==
=== Women ===
Rank	Gymnast	Vault (gymnastics)	Uneven bars	Balance beam	Floor (gymnastics)	Total
1st place, gold medalist(s)	Gabby Douglas (USA)	15.100	15.266	14.966	14.833	60.165
2nd place, silver medalist(s)	Maggie Nichols (USA)	15.033	14.633	14.833	15.200	59.699
3rd place, bronze medalist(s)	Ellie Black (CAN)	14.800	13.866	14.400	14.066	57.132
4	Amy Tinkler (GBR)	14.833	13.833	14.200	13.066	55.932
5	Carlotta Ferlito (ITA)	14.100	12.666	14.566	14.266	55.598
6	Mai Murakami (JPN)	14.666	13.066	12.833	13.866	54.431
7	Tabea Alt (GER)	14.666	13.933	13.300	12.500	54.399
8	Tisha Volleman (NED)	14.00	13.033	12.900	12.733	52.666
9	Lorrane Oliveira (BRA)	14.866	11.566	12.400	11.466	50.298

=== Men ===
Rank	Gymnast	Floor (gymnastics)	Pommel horse	Rings (gymnastics)	Vault (gymnastics)	Parallel bars	Horizontal bar	Total
1st place, gold medalist(s)	Ryohei Kato (JPN)	15.100	14.466	14.666	14.900	14.566	15.233	88.931
2nd place, silver medalist(s)	Donnell Whittenburg (USA)	15.433	13.600	15.500	15.266	15.466	13.300	88.565
3rd place, bronze medalist(s)	Sun Wei (CHN)	14.100	15.033	13.700	15.100	14.766	14.966	87.665
4	Sam Mikulak (USA)	14.166	13.766	14.500	14.766	15.400	13.366	85.964
5	Nile Wilson (GBR)	13.266	12.766	14.633	14.500	15.266	13.700	84.131
6	Pablo Brägger (SUI)	13.666	12.900	13.666	14.866	13.400	15.166	83.664
7	Park Min-soo (KOR)	13.666	14.433	14.566	13.900	14.100	12.700	83.365
8	Andreas Bretschneider (DEU)	13.966	13.366	14.133	14.200	13.533	13.900	83.098
9	Lucas Bitencourt (BRA)	11.233	12.500	14.066	13.600	12.966	12.633	76.998

== Nastia Liukin Cup ==
The 7th Nastia Liukin Cup at the 2016 AT&T American Cup
- Venue: Prudential Center
- Location: Newark, New Jersey, U.S.
- Date: March 4, 2015
- Competitors: 36

Medalists
gold medal	Senior: Rachael Lukacs (North Stars); Junior: Andrea Li (Legacy Elite)

The 7th Annual Nastia Liukin Cup was held in conjunction with the 2016 American Cup. Since its inception in 2010, the competition has always been held on the Friday night before the American Cup, in the same arena. In previous years, competitors included Gabrielle Douglas, Kayla Williams, MyKayla Skinner, Amelia Hundley, Lexie Priessman, Maggie Nichols, and Ashton Locklear.

== Elite Team Cup ==
On January 13, 2016, USA Gymnastics announced that the American Cup would also be held in conjunction with the Elite Team Cup, a men's competition, for the first time.

The competition took place on Saturday evening, after the American Cup.
