= Buckeye Gymnastics =

Women's artistic gymnastics academy in Ohio

Buckeye
- Full name: Buckeye Gymnastics
- Sport: Women's artistic gymnastics
- Founded: November 1982; 44 years ago
- Based in: Westerville, Ohio
- Owner: David Holcomb
- Head coach: Kittia Carpenter
- Members: Gabby Douglas
- Website: buckeyegymnastics.com

Buckeye Gymnastics is an American women's artistic gymnastics academy, with two locations in Westerville and Powell. It was home to Olympic Champion Gabby Douglas during her 2016 Olympic comeback.

== History ==
Buckeye Gymnastics was founded in November 1982 by former Ohio State University gymnast, David Holcomb and partner Alan Ashworth. January 1983 in a 4,600 square foot facility, and served merely 52 gymnasts at that time. Buckeye Gymnastics then moved to a new, larger building in 1986. During this time PanAmerican Games gymnast Tracy Butler trained at the gym. Holcomb became the sole owner of the gym in the late 1990s after acquiring Ashworth’s percentage of the company.

The gym moved into its current building in 2001, a 15,000 square foot facility located in Westerville, which was expanded to 21,000 square feet soon afterwards, and which underwent a further 5,600 square foot expansion and renovation in 2016. As of that year, the gym trained between 1,800 and 1,900 gymnasts, cheerleaders, and tumblers per year, including several members of the US National Gymnastics team such as Gabby Douglas. The combined square footage between the Westerville complex and a secondary complex in Powell, is 50,600 square feet, and about three thousand gymnasts train at Buckeye between the two facilities.

In 2018 Buckeye Gymnastics advocated his gymnasts stepping forward to support those who had suffered abuse in the Nassar case and who had treated some gymnasts who trained at the gym, though none were among those who had been abused. In reply to the investigation into Nassar, Holcomb stated that, “I think the entire gymnastics community is speaking with one voice … It’s not just about winning medals. The medals only mean anything if our athletes have been taken care of.” Holcomb first enacted proactive youth safety policies in the mid-2000s.

== Buckeye Classic Gymnastics Competition ==
Since 1983, the gym has hosted the annual Buckeye Classic Gymnastics Competition. The event is generally held at the Ohio Expo Centre, and features several thousand gymnasts from across the US in competition across several age groups. Over the years the event has featured several future Olympians competing early in their careers, including Carly Patterson and Kerri Strug.

== Current coaching staff ==
As of December 13, 2023

- Kittia Carpenter - Girls Team Director - Former Arizona State Sun Devils gymnast.
- Becky Doggette - Girls Team Coach - West Virginia Mountaineers gymnast, wife of Cecil Doggette.
- Sasha Timchenko - Girls Team Coach - Former USSR gymnast.

=== Former notable coaches ===
- Li Li

== Notable alumni ==
- Nia Dennis - Senior international elite, U.S. National team member since 2012, and 2015 Pan American Games team alternate. Left Buckeye in July, 2015 to train at Legacy Elite Gymnastics in Illinois.
- Gabby Douglas - Senior international elite, 2012 Olympic Champion, 2015 World Championships Silver All Around and Team Gold, American Cup Champion 2016, trained at Buckeye August 2014 - August 2016.
